= 2015 BET Hip Hop Awards =

Annual edition of the awards show

- Date: October 9, 2015
- Location: Atlanta Civic Center
- Hosted by: Snoop Dogg

Television/radio coverage
- Network: BET, MTV, MTV2

The 2015 BET Hip Hop Awards were held on October 9, 2015 at the Atlanta Civic Center and aired on October 13, 2015 on BET, MTV, and MTV2. The nominations were announced on September 15, 2015. Snoop Dogg served as host for the third consecutive year. Canadian rapper Drake led the nominations with 12 nominations. Just behind Drake were Big Sean with 10 nods and Kanye West and Nicki Minaj with 9 each. Kendrick Lamar and J. Cole were up for 8 awards.

== Performances ==
- Future – "Where Ya At" and "March Madness
- Young Dro featuring T.I. – "We in da City"
- Kid Ink featuring Dej Loaf, and DJ Mustard – "Be Real"
- Puff Daddy & the Family featuring Lil' Kim, Styles P, and King Los – "Workin'"
- Rich Homie Quan – "Flex (Ooh, Ooh, Ooh)"
- Travis Scott – "90210" and "Antidote"
- O.T. Genasis – "CoCo"
- iLoveMemphis – "Hit the Quan"

== Cyphers ==
- Pre-Show Cypher – Tripz, Muggsy Malone & Albe Black
- Cypher 1 – Charles Hamilton, Jackie Spade, Joyner Lucas & Tink
- Cypher 2 – Erick Sermon, Redman & Keith Murray of Def Squad
- Cypher 3 – King Mez, J-Doe, Raury, Casey Veggies & Vince Staples
- Cypher 4 – Lin-Manuel Miranda, Renée Elise Goldsberry, Daveed Diggs, Black Thought & Questlove
- Cypher 5 – Doug E. Fresh, Nicole Paris & Rahzel
- Live Cypher – T-Top, Rain, Charlie Clips, DNA & K-Shine

== Nominations and winners ==
=== Best Hip Hop Video ===
Kendrick Lamar - "Alright"

- Big Sean featuring Chris Brown & Ty Dolla $ign - "Play No Games"
- Big Sean featuring Drake & Kanye West - "Blessings"
- Fetty Wap - "Trap Queen"
- Nicki Minaj featuring Beyoncé - "Feeling Myself"

=== Best Collabo, Duo or Group ===
Big Sean featuring Drake & Kanye West - "Blessings"

- Big Sean featuring E-40 - "I Don't F**k with You"
- Fetty Wap featuring Monty - "My Way"
- Nicki Minaj featuring Beyoncé - "Feeling Myself"
- Nicki Minaj featuring Drake & Lil Wayne - "Truffle Butter"

=== Best Live Performer ===
J. Cole

- Drake
- Kanye West
- Kendrick Lamar
- Nicki Minaj

=== Lyricist of the Year ===
Kendrick Lamar

- Big Sean
- Drake
- J. Cole
- Nicki Minaj

=== Video Director of the Year ===
Benny Boom

- Alan Ferguson
- Chris Robinson
- Colin Tilley
- Director X

=== DJ of the Year ===
DJ Mustard

- DJ Drama
- DJ Envy
- DJ Esco
- DJ Khaled

=== Producer of the Year ===
DJ Mustard

- J. Cole
- Kanye West
- Mike WiLL Made It
- Pharrell
- Timbaland

=== MVP of the Year ===
Drake

- Big Sean
- Future
- J. Cole
- Kendrick Lamar
- Nicki Minaj

=== Track of the Year ===
Only the producer of the track nominated in this category.

"Trap Queen" - Produced By Tony Fadd (Fetty Wap)

- "Alright" - Produced By Pharrell Williams & Sounwave (Kendrick Lamar)
- "Blessings" - Produced By Boi-1da & Vinylz (Big Sean featuring Drake & Kanye West)
- "Commas" - Produced By DJ Spinz & Southside (Future)
- "I Don't F**k with You" - Produced By DJ Dahi, DJ Mustard, Kanye West & Key Wane (Big Sean featuring E-40)

=== Album of the Year ===
J. Cole - 2014 Forest Hills Drive

- Big Sean - Dark Sky Paradise
- Drake - If You're Reading This It's Too Late
- Kendrick Lamar - To Pimp A Butterfly
- Nicki Minaj - The Pinkprint
- Wale - The Album About Nothing

=== Who Blew Up Award ===
Fetty Wap

- Bobby Shmurda
- DeJ Loaf
- Rae Sremmurd
- Tink

=== Hustler of the Year ===
Drake

- Dr. Dre
- J. Cole
- Jay-Z
- Nicki Minaj

=== Made-You-Look Award ===
DeJ Loaf

- A$AP Rocky
- Drake
- Kanye West
- Nicki Minaj

=== Best Hip Hop Online Site ===
Worldstarhiphop.Com

- Allhiphop.Com
- Complex.Com
- Hotnewhiphop.Com
- Rapradar.Com

=== Best Club Banger ===
Big Sean featuring E-40 - "I Don't F**k with You" (Produced By DJ Dahi, DJ Mustard, Kanye West & Key Wane)

- DeJ Loaf - "Try Me" (Produced By DDS)
- Fetty Wap - "Trap Queen" (Produced By Tony Fadd)
- Future - "Commas" (Produced By DJ Spinz & Southside)
- Rich Homie Quan - "Flex (Ooh, Ooh, Ooh)" (Produced By DJ Spinz & Nitti Beatz)

=== Best Mixtape ===
Future - 56 Nights

- Future - Beast Mode
- Future - Monster
- Lil Wayne - Sorry 4 the Wait 2
- Travi$ Scott - Days Before Rodeo

=== Sweet 16: Best Featured Verse ===
Drake - "My Way Remix" (Fetty Wap Featuring Drake)

- Drake - "Blessings" (Big Sean Featuring Drake & Kanye West)
- E-40 - "I Don't F**k with You" (Big Sean Featuring E-40)
- Kendrick Lamar - "Classic Man Remix" (Jidenna featuring Kendrick Lamar)
- Lil Wayne - "Truffle Butter" (Nicki Minaj featuring Drake & Lil Wayne)

=== Impact Track ===
Kendrick Lamar - "Alright"

- Big Sean featuring Kanye West & John Legend - "One Man Can Change The World"
- Common & John Legend - "Glory" (From The Motion Picture Selma)
- J. Cole - "Apparently"
- J. Cole - "Be Free"

=== People's Champ Award ===
Big Sean featuring Drake & Kanye West - "Blessings"

- Fetty Wap - "Trap Queen"
- Future - "Commas"
- Kendrick Lamar - "i"
- Rae Sremmurd - "No Type"
- Rich Homie Quan - "Flex (Ooh, Ooh, Ooh)"

=== I Am Hip Hop Award ===
Scarface
