= BET Awards 2015 =

American entertainment awards ceremony

15th BET Awards
- Date: June 28, 2015
- Location: Microsoft Theater; Los Angeles, California
- Presented by: Black Entertainment Television
- Hosted by: Anthony Anderson; Tracee Ellis Ross
- Website: http://bet.com/betawards

Television/radio coverage
- Network: BET

The 15th BET Awards was held at the Microsoft Theater in Los Angeles, California on June 28, 2015 and was televised on BET. This year marked the ceremony's 15th anniversary and the milestone was celebrated throughout the show, which was hosted by Anthony Anderson and Tracee Ellis Ross.

The nominees were announced on May 18, 2015. Nicki Minaj and Chris Brown lead the nominations with six each. Beyoncé and Lil Wayne followed with four each. Beyoncé and Chris Brown were the big winners of the night with 3 awards each. Nicki Minaj won 2 awards. Smokey Robinson was honored with the Lifetime Achievement Award, while Janet Jackson was honored with the inaugural Ultimate Icon: Music Dance Visual Award. Radio host Tom Joyner was also honored, receiving the Humanitarian Award. The show also featured a reunion of the Bad Boy Records roster, which included performances by founder Sean "Diddy" Combs as well as Lil' Kim, Mase, 112, Faith Evans, The Lox, and more.

== Nominations and winners ==
The following is a list of nominees. The winners were announced on June 28, 2015.

Video of the Year	Video Director of the Year
Beyoncé – "7/11"; Common featuring John Legend - "Glory"; Big Sean featuring E-40 – "I Don't Fuck with You"; Chris Brown featuring Lil Wayne and Tyga – "Loyal"; Chris Brown featuring Usher and Rick Ross – "New Flame"; Nicki Minaj – "Anaconda"	Beyoncé, Ed Burke and Todd Tourso; Benny Boom; Chris Robinson; Fatima Robinson; Hype Williams
Best Female R&B/Pop Artist	Best Male R&B/Pop Artist
Beyoncé; K. Michelle; Ciara; Janelle Monáe; Rihanna; Jhené Aiko	Chris Brown; August Alsina; John Legend; The Weeknd; Trey Songz; Usher
Best Female Hip Hop Artist	Best Male Hip Hop Artist
Nicki Minaj; Azealia Banks; Iggy Azalea; Dej Loaf; Trina; Tink	Kendrick Lamar; Big Sean; Common; J. Cole; Drake; Wale
Best Group	Best Collaboration
Rae Sremmurd; Jodeci; A$AP Mob; Migos; Rich Gang; Young Money	Common and John Legend – "Glory"; August Alsina featuring Nicki Minaj – "No Love" (Remix); Big Sean featuring E-40 – "I Don't Fuck with You"; Chris Brown featuring Lil Wayne and Tyga – "Loyal"; Chris Brown featuring Usher and Rick Ross – "New Flame"; Mark Ronson featuring Bruno Mars – "Uptown Funk"
Best New Artist	Best Gospel Artist
Sam Smith; Bobby Shmurda; Dej Loaf; Fetty Wap; Rae Sremmurd; Tinashe	Lecrae; Deitrick Haddon; Erica Atkins-Campbell; Fred Hammond; Mali Music; Michelle Williams
Coca-Cola Viewers' Choice Award	Centric Award
Nicki Minaj featuring Drake, Lil Wayne and Chris Brown – "Only"; Beyoncé – "7/11"; Dej Loaf - "Try Me"; Kendrick Lamar – "i"; Rae Sremmurd featuring Nicki Minaj and Young Thug – "Throw Sum Mo"; The Weeknd – "Earned It"	The Weeknd – "Earned It"; AverySunshine – "Call My Name"; Jazmine Sullivan featuring Meek Mill – "Dumb"; Sam Smith & Mary J. Blige – "Stay With Me"; Mark Ronson featuring Bruno Mars – "Uptown Funk"
Best Actress	Best Actor
Taraji P. Henson; Gabrielle Union; Kerry Washington; Tracee Ellis Ross; Viola Davis	Terrence Howard; Anthony Anderson; Idris Elba; Jussie Smollett; Kevin Hart
YoungStars Award	Best Movie
Mo'ne Davis; Jacob Latimore; Jaden Smith; Quvenzhané Wallis; Zendaya	Selma; Annie; Beyond the Lights; Think Like a Man Too; Top Five
Sportswoman of the Year	Sportsman of the Year
Serena Williams; Brittney Griner; Candace Parker; Skylar Diggins; Venus Williams	Stephen Curry; Chris Paul; Floyd Mayweather; LeBron James; Marshawn Lynch
Best International Act: Africa	Best International Act: UK
Stonebwoy; AKA; Fally Ipupa; Sarkodie; Sauti Sol; The Soil; Wizkid; Yemi Alade	Stormzy; FKA Twigs; Fuse ODG; Lethal Bizzle; Little Simz; MNEK
Viewer's Choice Award: Best New International Act	FANdemoniam Award
Eddy Kenzo; Cassper Nyovest; George the Poet; MiC LOWRY; MzVee; Novelists	Chris Brown; Beyoncé; Drake; Nicki Minaj

== Performers ==
Artist(s)	Song(s)
Kendrick Lamar	"Alright"
Janelle Monáe; Jidenna	"Yoga" (Monáe) "Classic Man" (Jidenna)
Chris Brown; Tyga; Omarion	"Liquor" (Brown) "Ayo" (Brown and Tyga) "Post to Be" (Brown and Omarion)
The Weeknd; Alicia Keys	"The Hills" "Earned It"
Donnie McClurkin	Tribute to Andrae Crouch "The Blood Will Never Lose Its Power"
Silento	"Watch Me"
Diddy; Mase; 112; Faith Evans; French Montana; The LOX; Lil' Kim; Pharrell Williams	Bad Boy Reunion: 1. "Can't Nobody Hold Me Down" (Diddy); 2. "Feel So Good" (Mase); 3. "Peaches & Cream" (112); 4. "I Need a Girl (Part Two)" (Diddy); 5. "Love Like This" (Evans); 6. "Hot Nigga (Remix)" (Montana); 7. "Can't You See" (Tribute to The Notorious B.I.G.); 8. "It's All About the Benjamins" (Diddy, LOX and Kim); 9. "Mo Money Mo Problems" (Diddy and Mase) (Tribute to The Notorious B.I.G.); 10. "Finna Get Loose" (Williams)
Tori Kelly; Robin Thicke; Ne-Yo	Tribute to Smokey Robinson: 1. "Who's Loving You" (Kelly); 2. "Ooo Baby Baby" (Thicke); 3. "The Tears of a Clown" (Ne-Yo)
Smokey Robinson	"The Tracks of My Tears" "Cruisin'" "My Girl" (with Tori Kelly, Robin Thicke and Ne-Yo)
Meek Mill; Nicki Minaj; Chris Brown	"Monster" (Mill) "All Eyes on You"
Yazz; Jussie Smollett; Serayah; Juicy J	"No Apologies" (Yazz and Smollett) "Drip Drop" (Yazz, Serayah and Juicy J) "You're So Beautiful" (Smollett)
Anthony Hamilton; Gary Clark, Jr.	Tribute to Percy Sledge, Ben E. King and B.B. King "When a Man Loves a Woman" "Stand By Me" "The Thrill is Gone"
Big Sean; E-40	"One Man Can Change the World" (Sean) "Blessings" (Sean) "I Don't Fuck with You"
Tinashe; Jason Derulo; Ciara	Dance Tribute to Janet Jackson: 1. "The Pleasure Principle" (Tinashe); 2. "All For You" (Derulo); 3. "If" (Ciara); 4. "Rhythm Nation"; 5. "No Sleeep" (performed by the Unbreakable World Tour dancers)
K. Michelle; Tamar Braxton; Patti LaBelle	"Hard To Do" (Michelle) "If I Don't Have You" (Braxton) "If Only You Knew"
Fetty Wap	"Trap Queen"

== Presenters ==
- Michael B. Jordan
- Zendaya
- Laverne Cox
- Sanaa Lathan
- Michael Ealy

== Special awards ==
- Smokey Robinson, Lifetime Achievement Award
- Tom Joyner, Humanitarian Award
- Janet Jackson, Ultimate Icon: Music Dance Visual Award
