= Paradise (Big Sean song) =

Single by Big Sean

from the album Dark Sky Paradise
- Released: October 7, 2014
- Recorded: 2014
- Length: 3:35 (album version); 2:28 (single version)
- Label: GOOD; Def Jam
- Songwriters: Sean Anderson; Michael Williams
- Producer: Mike Will Made It

Big Sean singles chronology
"I Don't Fuck with You" (2014)	"Paradise" (2014)	"Detroit vs. Everybody" (2014)

"Paradise" is a song by American rapper Big Sean, released on September 19, 2014 as the second single from his third studio album Dark Sky Paradise (2015). Originally the song was released as a single in October 2014 but was later placed on the album as an extended version with an extra verse.

== Background and release ==
On September 12, 2014, Big Sean announced he had signed with Roc Nation for a management deal, but he is still with GOOD Music. On the same day, he has released 4 new songs, "I Don't Fuck with You", "Paradise", "4th Quarter" and "Jit / Juke". The production for these songs were included Mike Will Made It, DJ Mustard, Kanye West, DJ Dahi, Nate Fox, Da Internz, L&F and Key Wane. The single version was released on iTunes October 7, 2014.

== Music video ==
A music video for the song was released on October 9, 2014 via Sean's Vevo channel. It was directed by Mike Carson.

== Charts ==
Chart (2015)	Peak position
US Billboard Hot 100	99
US Hot R&B/Hip-Hop Songs (Billboard)	34

== Certifications ==
Region	Certification	Certified units/sales
United States (RIAA)	Platinum	1,000,000^{‡}
^{‡} Sales+streaming figures based on certification alone.
