= Play No Games =

Single by Big Sean featuring Chris Brown and Ty Dolla Sign

from the album Dark Sky Paradise
- Released: September 22, 2015
- Recorded: 2014
- Genre: Hip hop; new jack swing; R&B
- Length: 3:37
- Label: GOOD; Def Jam
- Songwriters: Sean Anderson; Dwane Weir; Justin Johnson; Christopher Brown; Tyrone Griffin; Timothy Gatling; Gene Griffin; Aaron Hall; Edward Riley
- Producers: Key Wane; Jay John Henry

Big Sean singles chronology
| "Back Up" (2015) | "Play No Games" (2015) | "Champions" (2016) |

Chris Brown singles chronology
| "Zero" (2015) | "Play No Games" (2015) | "Player" (2015) |

Ty Dolla Sign singles chronology
| "Fakin'" (2015) | "Play No Games'" (2015) | "Saved" (2015) |

"Play No Games" is a song by American rapper Big Sean from his third studio album Dark Sky Paradise (2015). It features American singers Chris Brown and Ty Dolla Sign, with production handled by Key Wane and Jay John Henry. The song samples Guy's 1988 hit single "Piece of My Love". It was sent to US urban contemporary radio on September 22, 2015, as the album's fifth official single. The song peaked at number eight on the Billboard R&B/Hip-Hop Airplay chart while peaking at number 84 and number 28 on the Billboard Hot 100 and the Billboard Hot R&B/Hip-Hop Songs charts, respectively.

== Music video ==
Directed by Mike Carson and inspired by the popular sitcom Martin, the music video for "Play No Games" premiered at the BET Awards on June 28, 2015 and features French Montana, Sevyn Streeter, Reginald Ballard, appearing as Bruh Man, singing Ty Dolla Sign's vocals, along with a cameo appearance by the sitcom's title character, Martin Lawrence and the late Thomas Mikal Ford as Tommy

== Charts ==
| Chart (2015–2016) | Peak position |
|---|---|
| US Billboard Hot 100 | 84 |
| US Hot R&B/Hip-Hop Songs (Billboard) | 28 |
| US R&B/Hip-Hop Airplay (Billboard) | 8 |
| US Rhythmic Airplay (Billboard) | 15 |

== Certifications ==
| Region | Certification | Certified units/sales |
|---|---|---|
| New Zealand (RMNZ) | Gold | 15,000^{‡} |
| United States (RIAA) | Platinum | 1,000,000^{‡} |
^{‡} Sales+streaming figures based on certification alone.
