= Guap =

Single by Big Sean

from the album Hall of Fame
- Released: October 26, 2012
- Recorded: 2012
- Genre: Hip hop
- Length: 4:31
- Label: GOOD; Def Jam
- Songwriter(s): Sean Anderson; Tyree Pittman; Dwane Weir II; Alexander Izquierdo; Andrea Martin; Noah Goldstein
- Producer(s): Key Wane; Young Chop; Darhyl "Hey DJ" Camper; Rob Kinelski

Big Sean singles chronology
"Burn" (2012)	"Guap" (2012)	"Show Out" (2013)

"Guap" is a song by American hip hop recording artist Big Sean, released on October 26, 2012, as the lead single from his second studio album Hall of Fame (2013). The song was produced by frequent collaborator Key Wane and Young Chop with additional production from Darhyl "Hey DJ" Camper Jr. and Rob Kinelski. In addition to releasing the single, Big Sean also announced that his next album would be released on December 18, 2012, but it was later pushed back. The song features ad-libs from Kanye West and its producer Key Wane. It has peaked at number 21 on the US Billboard Hot R&B/Hip-Hop Songs chart.

== Background ==
The song's creation began in March or April 2012. KeY Wane says that Big Sean flew him out to Los Angeles; they went to the studio and were working on the Detroit mixtape and the album. Big Sean was quoted as saying, "Man I recorded these records on my phone about this really good song that I have an idea for." Then he texted Wane the reference; Wane listened to it and was quoted as saying, "Man this could be a really good song." The word guap has its origins as a slang for money.

Big Sean described the song as "something that strikes an emotional chord in people." He also said, "Everybody is about to go crazy, this is one of those good feelings, man."

The word "Guap" originated in New York.

== Music video ==
The music video was shot in Detroit on November 18, 2012. Big Sean shut down Woodward Avenue and most of downtown to film the video. The video was released on December 16, 2012.

== Charts ==
=== Weekly charts ===
Weekly chart performance for "Guap"
Chart (2012–2013)	Peak position
US Billboard Hot 100	71
US Hot R&B/Hip-Hop Songs (Billboard)	21

=== Year-end charts ===
Year-end chart performance for "Guap"
Chart (2013)	Position
US Hot R&B/Hip-Hop Songs (Billboard)	78

== Certifications ==
Certifications for "Guap"
Region	Certification	Certified units/sales
United States (RIAA)	Platinum	1,000,000^{‡}
^{‡} Sales+streaming figures based on certification alone.
