= Finally Famous Vol. 3: Big =

Mixtape by Big Sean
- Released: August 31, 2010
- Genre: Hip hop
- Label: GOOD Music
- Producers: Don Cannon; Big Sean; Kanye West; Nick Kage; DJ Spinz; The Olympicks; No I.D.; Eliseo; Chuck Inglish; Key Wane; Xaphoon Jones; WrighTrax; Mike Posner; Clinton Sparks
- Compiler: Don Cannon

Big Sean chronology
Finally Famous Vol. 2: Uknowbigsean (2009)	Finally Famous Vol. 3: Big (2010)	Finally Famous (2011)

Finally Famous Vol. 3: Big is the third mixtape by American rapper Big Sean. It was released as a free online download on August 31, 2010, by Kanye West's label GOOD Music. The production was handled from Sean himself, alongside label boss West, Clinton Sparks and No I.D., while guest appearances on the project include Bun B, Big K.R.I.T., YG, Drake, Asher Roth, Mike Posner, Tyga and Currensy.

The album's lyrical content largely deals with Sean's history and his recent fame, with the focus mainly being on his burgeoning music career. On January 3, 2011, the mixtape was re-released through GOOD music's official blog, where it included these three additional reissued tracks, and the tape has been lacking the Don Cannon's voice-overs, as well as the bonus track, which features Kanye West.

== Promotion ==
The videos were shot for the songs such as "Too Fake" featuring Chiddy Bang, "What U Doin' (Bullshittin')", "Ambiguous" featuring Mike Posner and Clinton Sparks, "Crazy", "Supa Dupa Lemonade", "Hometown", "Final Hour", "Made" featuring Drake, and "High Rise".

== Track listing ==
The track listing was confirmed by XXL.

No.	Title	Producer(s)	Length
1.	"Final Hour"	Don Cannon; Nick Kage	4:26
2.	"Meant to Be"	DJ Spinz	4:00
3.	"What U Doin' (Bullshittin')"	The Olympicks	2:46
4.	"Money & Sex" (featuring Bun B)	No I.D.	3:47
5.	"Five Bucks (5 On It)" (featuring Chip tha Ripper and Curren$y)	Tone Capone	3:42
6.	"High Rise"	Don Cannon	3:25
7.	"Crazy"	The Olympicks	3:44
8.	"Hometown"	Metro Boomin; Eliseo	2:53
9.	"Supa Dupa Lemonade"	Bangladesh	3:41
10.	"Fat Raps (Remix)" (featuring Chuck Inglish, Asher Roth, Chip tha Ripper, Dom Kennedy and Boldy James)	Chuck Inglish	5:12
11.	"My Closet" (featuring SAYITAINTTONE)	Key Wane	3:56
12.	"Too Fake" (featuring Chiddy Bang)	Xaphoon Jones	4:13
13.	"Fuck My Opponent" (featuring Tyga)	Trillionz; Young Kwon	3:10
14.	"Made" (featuring Drake)	WrighTrax; Kanye West	4:12
15.	"Ambiguous" (Mike Posner featuring Big Sean and Clinton Sparks)	Clinton Sparks	3:47
16.	"Almost Wrote You a Love Song" (featuring Suai)	Key Wane	3:58
17.	"Memories"	Key Wane; Frank Nitty	3:34
18.	"Shit Got Damn" (Chris Brown featuring Big Sean)	Kevin McCall	2:53
19.	"In the Morning" (YG featuring Big Sean, Big K.R.I.T. and Ty Dolla Sign)	Oddz N Endz	3:59
20.	"Big Nut Bust"	The Monsters and the Strangerz	3:09

Notes

- The tracks 18, 19 and 20 are the additional tracks for the re-released version.
- On the original release, the tape had one untitled bonus track featuring Kanye West. This song was later revealed to be called "Glenwood".

Sample credits

- "Five Bucks" contains a sample of "I Got 5 On It" performed by Luniz.
- "Supa Dupa Lemonade" contains a sample of "Lemonade" performed by Gucci Mane.
- "Too Fake" contains a sample of "Too Fake" performed by Hockey.
- "My Closet" contains a sample of "Your Song" performed by Ellie Goulding.
- "Hometown" contains a sample of "Hometown Glory" performed by Adele.
