= Partition (song) =

2014 single by Beyoncé

Single by Beyoncé

from the album Beyoncé
- Language: English; French
- Released: February 25, 2014
- Recorded: 2013
- Studio: Jungle City (New York City); Oven (New York City)
- Genre: Electro-R&B; pop; hip-hop
- Length: 5:19
- Label: Columbia
- Composers: Dwane Weir; Justin Timberlake; Timothy Mosley; Jerome Harmon; Mike Dean
- Lyricists: Beyoncé Knowles; Terius Nash
- Producers: Beyoncé; Timbaland; J-Roc; Justin Timberlake

Beyoncé singles chronology
"Part II (On the Run)" (2013)	"Partition" (2014)	"Say Yes" (2014)

Music videos
- "Yoncé" on YouTube; "Partition" on YouTube

"Partition" is a song by American singer Beyoncé from her fifth studio album, Beyoncé (2013). Beyoncé wrote and produced the song with Justin Timberlake, Timbaland, Jerome "J-Roc" Harmon, Dwane "Key Wane" Weir, and Mike Dean, with additional writing from The-Dream and additional production from Jordy "Boots" Asher. "Partition" was released to American urban contemporary radio on February 25, 2014, as the third single from Beyoncé.

The song consists of two parts, individually titled "Yoncé" and "Partition". "Partition" has a sound that combines electro-R&B and hip-hop. Its production musically consists of a sparse synthesized arrangement, a thrusting bassline and a heavy drumbeat. Exploring the deep, sexual nature of Beyoncé, "Partition" depicts sexual intercourse in the back of a limousine. The closing minute of the song features a spoken word interpolation taken from the French dub of the 1998 film The Big Lebowski, a speech originally spoken by Julianne Moore.

"Partition" peaked at number 23 on the US Billboard Hot 100 chart, number nine on the US Hot R&B/Hip-Hop Songs chart and number one on the US Hot Dance Club Songs chart. Accompanying music videos for "Yoncé" and "Partition" were released on December 13, 2013, on Beyoncé. The former clip was directed by Ricky Saiz and filmed on the streets of Brooklyn, New York, while the latter was directed by Jake Nava and shot at the Parisian cabaret club Crazy Horse. Both "Yoncé" and "Partition" were added to the setlist and performed live during the second European leg of The Mrs. Carter Show World Tour (2013–14) and later during the On the Run Tour (2014), The Formation World Tour (2016), and the Renaissance World Tour (2023).

== Conception and release ==
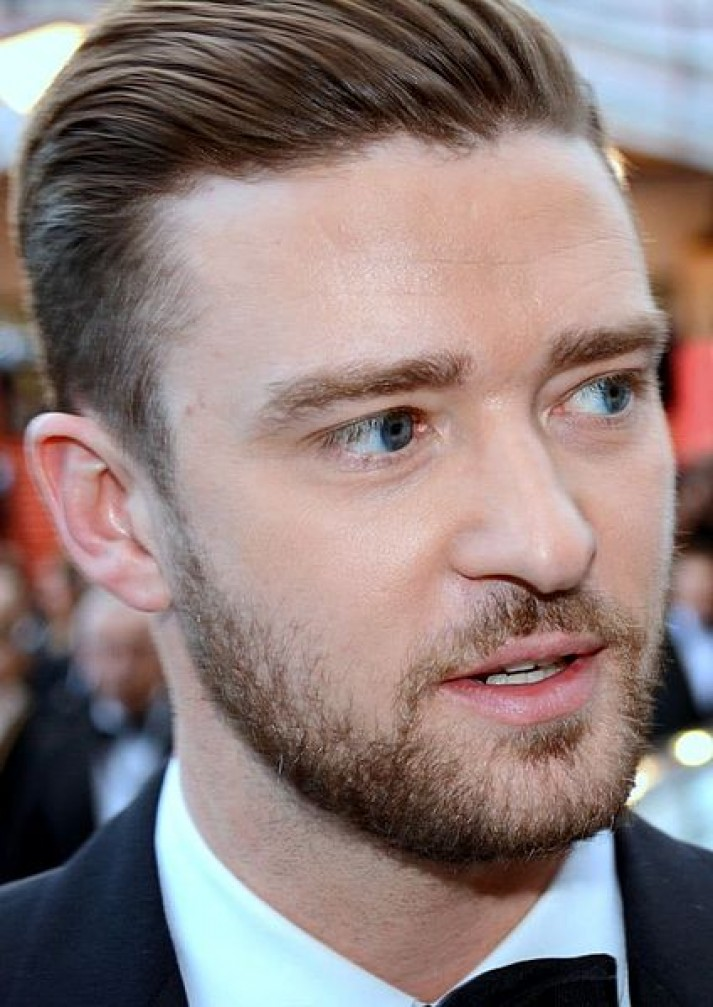
Justin Timberlake (pictured) co-wrote and co-produced the song.

"Partition" was conceived as a two-part song, the first part of which is called "Yoncé". "Yoncé" was written by Beyoncé and Terius Nash with music by Timothy Mosley, Justin Timberlake, Dwane Weir, Jerome Harmon and Mike Dean. "Partition" was written by Beyoncé with music by Dwane Weir and Mike Dean. The production was handled by Timberlake, Beyoncé, as well as Mosley, Harmon and Wane under their stage names Timbaland, J-Roc and Key Wane respectively, with additional production by Mike Dean and Boots. Yoncé's original drumbeat was created by Timberlake on a bucket. Mike Dean then added the dropping 808's lead synths, claps and strings. Beyoncé described the sound that he created as "organic" and said, "It reminded me of being in middle school during the lunch breaks, when you just start free-styling." The beat was originally given to British rapper Dizzee Rascal, but didn't use it because he "couldn't come up with nothing for it". The trio decided to keep the buckets as Beyoncé wanted an organic production. Afterwards, The-Dream started writing some of the lyrics including, "Yoncé all on his mouth like liquor". Beyoncé found it awkward at the beginning but she soon loved the phrase, which led to the birth of her new alter ego, Yoncé. The singer revealed that she was "embarrassed" after she recorded "Partition" because of its overtly sexual lyrics. Speaking about how the other part of the song materialized, Beyoncé said:

It takes me back to being in my car as a teenager. It takes me back to when me and my husband first meet, and he tries to scoop me and he thinks I'm the hottest thing in the world. I kinda had this whole fantasy of being in the car, and this whole movie played in my head. I didn't have a pen and paper. I got to the mic, I'm like, 'Oh, press Record.'

The song was produced at the Jungle City Studios and Oven Studios in New York City. Once the musical arrangements were done by the production team, the music was recorded by Stuart White, Chris Godbey, Ann Mincieli and Bart Schoudel. White and Tony Maserati mixed the track while the audio engineering was carried out by James Krausse and Matt Weber with assistance from Justin Hergett, Chris Tabron and Matt Wiggers; the second engineer was Ramon Rivas. The audio mastering was done by Tom Coyne and Aya Merrill. Timberlake and Timbaland served as backing vocalists and recorded the vocals of Beyoncé. The spoken section towards the end of "Partition" was recorded by Hajiba Fahmy, one of Beyoncé's dancers. "Partition" officially impacted US urban contemporary radio on February 25, 2014 as the third single from Beyoncé. "Partition" also officially impacted radio stations in Italy on March 28, 2014.

== Composition ==
"Partition"
A sample of "Partition", a song full of sub-bass. Exploring the deeply sexual nature of Beyoncé, the song describes sexual intercourse in the back of a limousine; it features straightforward and memorable lines (such as the Clinton–Lewinsky scandal reference, "He Monica Lewinsky-ed all on my gown"), sung by Beyoncé on a thrusting and resounding bassline.

"Partition" has been described as "electro-R&B" that moves "from a sweet, girl-group pop sound to Dirty South hip-hop". It builds on a slinky Caribbean groove and spacey heavy beats provided by Roland TR-808 tom drums and bass drums. The track also musically consists of sparse synthesizer pulses, little swoops and finger snaps. The lyrics are candidly sexual; Melissa Locker of Time magazine wrote that "Partition" leaves no sexual innuendo unturned. Commenting on Beyoncé's vocal styles and experimentation on the track, Annie Zaleski of Las Vegas Weekly noted that she displays much attitude through her lines and ornaments her singing with trills—rapid alternations between two adjacent notes, usually a semitone or tone apart. Zaleski further wrote that Beyoncé adopts a doo-wop vocal-based style to sing some of the lyrics and even utters occasional purrs—murmuring sounds expressive of pleasure.

The song begins with a short call-and-response audio clip from The Mrs. Carter Show World Tour, May 31, 2013 Antwerp leg, as Beyoncé asks the crowd "Lemme [sic] hear you say 'Hayyy [sic] Ms. Carter!'". It then transitions into what Andrew Hampp of Billboard magazine called the "lady thug anthem" of "Yoncé". Beyoncé delivers half-rapped verses on the first half of the song, in which the female protagonist teases male subjects in a club as she turns heads. In the first verse, she warns the other women in the club, "Every girl on here gotta look me up and down / All on Instagram cake by the pound". The singer adds on the second verse, "I sneezed on the beat and the beat got sicker." "Yoncé" closes with the bridge as Beyoncé sings repeatedly, "Yoncé all on his mouth like liquor", while an ascending siren echoes over a staccato bass that hits heavily and uniformly in the background.

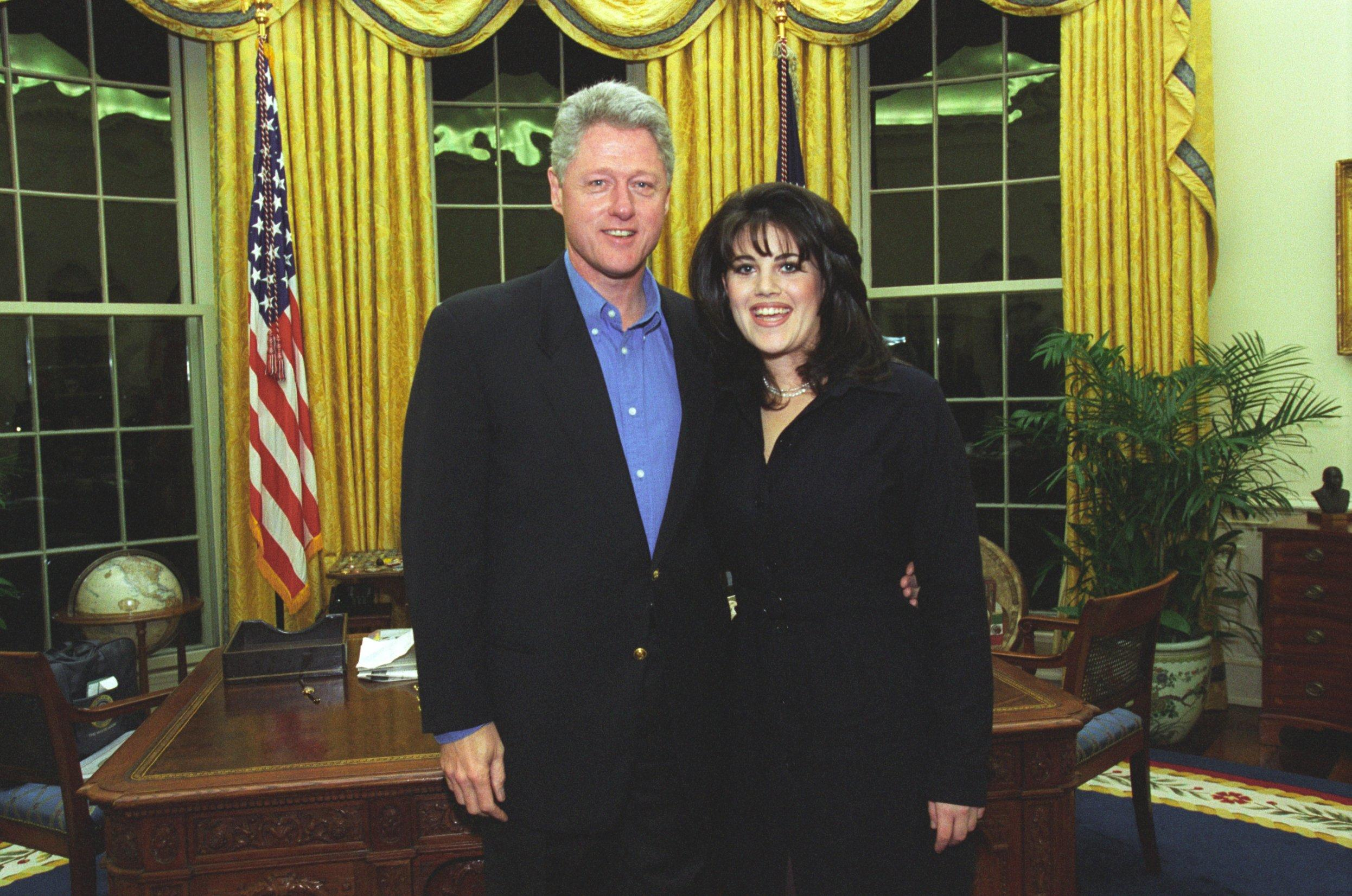
Beyoncé uses the 1998 emerging political sex scandal between US President Bill Clinton and Monica Lewinsky (both pictured) as "a euphemism for her man finishing on her clothing" as she sings, "He Monica Lewinskyed all on my gown".

The second part, titled "Partition", is preceded by the sound of paparazzi camera clicks and a window whirring up, which separates it from the first part "Yoncé". "Partition" has a fractured production and is lyrically about the female protagonist having sex with her romantic interest in the backseat of a limousine. Caitlin White, writing for The 405, highlighted that the song details a romantic relationship in which women do not act as sexual objects during sexual intercourse but rather use "the physical act of love as a form of agency", from which they derive pleasure. "Partition" gained significant attention for its explicit lyrics, with frequent references made to the opening lines of the first verse in which Beyoncé asks her driver to put up the partition.

On the hook lines, Beyoncé adopts whispery vocals, singing that she wants to please her man, "Take all of me / I just wanna be the girl you like, girl you like". The closing minute of the song features a French spoken word interpolation, which translates roughly as: "Do you like sex? Sex. I mean, the physical activity. Coitus. Do you like it? You're not interested in sex? Men think that feminists hate sex, but it's a very stimulating and natural activity that women love". David Haglund and Forrest Wickman of Slate magazine noted undeniable similarities between this spoken section and a quote by actress Julianne Moore in 1998 film The Big Lebowski. In May 2014, during an interview with Vanity Fair, Lewinsky addressed the lyrics of the song mentioning her, saying, "Thanks, Beyoncé, but if we're verbing, I think you meant 'Bill Clinton'd all on my gown'".

== Critical reception ==
Glenn Gamboa of Newsday wrote that Beyoncé "channels her inner Prince, moving from a sweet, girl-group pop sound to Dirty South hip-hop". Michael Cragg of The Guardian highlighted that Beyoncé gives the best explanation of the album's raison d'être through the line, "Radio say speed it up / I just go slower". He further commended the way Beyoncé half-raps "with a delicious snarl" in the first part of the song. Many critics, including Una Mullalay of The Irish Times and Greg Kot of the Chicago Tribune welcomed Beyoncé's rapping on "Partition" and compared it to the work of British recording artist M.I.A. Andrew Barker of Variety magazine highlighted that among the songs that discuss sexuality on Beyoncé, "none hold a candle to the absolutely scorching 'Partition'". He also praised how Beyoncé "toss[es] off a few old-school battle rhymes" with the line, "I sneezed on the beat, and the beat got sicker", being a standout. Similarly, Miles Marshall Lewis of Ebony magazine noted that lines like, "I sneezed on the beat and the beat got sicker / Yoncé all on his mouth like liquor", would make listeners smile. He praised how Beyoncé "spills lyrics ... in a confident flow" and concluded, "As a singing rapper, she's still way more precious than ferocious."

Andrew Hampp of Billboard magazine commended the memorability of the lyrics and wrote that "'Partition' is yet another 'gettin' freaky with my baby' jam, with some of Bey's most frankly sexual lines yet." Similarly, Eliana Dockterman of Time magazine hailed the lyrical content of "Partition"; she noted that it suitably exemplifies "embodiment of modern feminism for a generation that has been reluctant to claim the word" and further praised how Beyoncé "express[es] her desire to please [her partner] while still projecting a fierce, independent persona". Melissa Locker, also writing for Time magazine, suggested that Beyoncé should work with Timbaland more often as "his sultry beats paired with her R-rated lyrics and the catchy chorus 'It took 45 minutes to get all dressed up / And we ain’t even gonna make it to this club', make a captivating combination". Chris Bosman of the same publication wrote an extensive review of the song:

But Beyoncé is far from being all sentiment. Because a large part of being Beyoncé in America in 2013 is being a sexual creature and not only being unafraid of that fact, but reveling—and reveling confidently—in it. The amorphous, shifting Houston-trap-meets-Noah Shebib trunk rattler 'Partition' exemplifies this particular sentiment. On the track, the Queen Bey tells her driver to put the partition up because 'I don't need you seeing 'Yoncé on her knees'; uses Monica Lewinsky as a euphemism for her man finishing on her clothing; reveals that 'he like to call me Peaches when we get this nasty'; and repeats that it took her '45 minutes to get all dressed up / and we ain't even gonna make it to this club'. And in maybe the wildest moment in an album full of bold moves, Beyoncé actually slips in the French translation of Julianne Moore's 'Feminists love sex' monologue from The Big Lebowski.

Ryan B. Patrick of Exclaim! noted that songs in the vein of "Partition" effectively display genre diversity, Beyoncé's vocal range and "a penchant of musical experimentation". Matthew Perpetua of BuzzFeed praised the French spoken section on "Partition", comparing it to the Chimamanda Ngozi Adichie sample on "Flawless" as she added: "It's good that these ideas aren't directly expressed by Beyoncé herself – in context, these bits are like reblogged quotes that frame her artistic intentions – because she knows she doesn't need to be so didactic when she's actually singing about sex, and to do so would defeat her point about owning her pleasures." Caitlin White of The 405 wrote extensively of "Partition" as a song that effectively shows that Beyoncé "catapults herself out of her very femininity into personhood by positioning female sexuality as a powerful, amorphous construct--one that transcends the female body even while uplifting it." White concluded that the singer does not exalt herself to become "the highest sex object or an egotistical pop princess" but anoints herself "as sexual goddess, she is at once desiring and desired, fulfilled and fulfilling". Mikael Wood of the Los Angeles Times wrote that "the spooky, almost perversely stripped-down 'Partition' reflect[s] [Beyoncé's] determination, rare among superstars, to keep pushing creatively".

=== Recognition ===
In the annual Pazz and Jop mass critics poll of the year's best in music in 2013, "Partition" was ranked at number 124. In July the following year, the writers of Spin magazine placed it at number four on the list of the 57 best songs so far, with a writer of the publication noting something "intensely gratifying about all the raunchiness on the strip-tease, booty-dropping banger" and added that it "oozes stunty swag and immediately became a coy anthem for pop-loving women; a song to flash and strut and snap to, and not only because the beat does too". Pitchfork Media listed the song 26th on its year-end list for 2014. Cosmopolitan editor Eliza Thompson ranked "Partition" as the Best Song of 2014 on her year-end list. Consequence of Sound considered Partition the 62nd best song of the 2010s.

== Chart performance ==
On the US Billboard Hot 100, "Partition" debuted at number 86 for the week ending January 25, 2014 without being released as a single. Following several weeks of spending different positions on the chart, it moved from 97 to its peak position of 23 for the week ending March 15, 2014 in its eighth week of charting. The song spent a total of 21 weeks on the chart and it was last seen at the position of 44. "Partition" became Beyoncé's tenth number-one on the US Hot R&B/Hip-Hop Airplay chart, extending her record for the most leaders among women. It also became Beyoncé's twentieth number-one on the US Hot Dance Club Songs chart for the issue dated May 17, 2014, making her the third artist with the most number-ones on the chart, behind Madonna (43) and Rihanna (22). It was later certified quintuple platinum by the Recording Industry Association of America (RIAA), denoting sales and streams of 5,000,000 units in that country.

In the United Kingdom, "Partition" entered the UK Singles Chart and the UK R&B Chart, at numbers 90 and 15 respectively on March 8, 2014. The following week, it moved to 74 and 12 on the charts respectively, which eventually became its peak positions. In Ireland, the single entered the Irish Singles Chart at its peak position of number 57 for the week ending March 13, 2014. The next week, which also marked its last, it fell to the position of 83 spending a total of two weeks on the chart. Elsewhere, "Partition" charted on the Ultratip charts in both regions of Belgium, (Wallonia and Flanders), in France and in South Korea.

== Music videos ==
Music videos for "Yoncé" and "Partition" were released on December 13, 2013 on Beyoncé through the iTunes Store. The video for "Partition" was uploaded to Beyoncé's official Vevo account on February 25, 2014 while the one for "Yoncé" was uploaded on November 24, 2014 to coincide with the release of Beyoncé: Platinum Edition.

=== "Yoncé" ===
==== Background and concept ====
The video for "Yoncé" was directed by Ricky Saiz, and features fashion and video models Chanel Iman, Jourdan Dunn and Joan Smalls. Filming took place on the streets of Brooklyn, New York. The director wanted to add "a raw, kind of lo-fi, very New York kind of grimy, dark aesthetic" to the video. Through the clip, Beyoncé introduces viewers to her new alter ego Yoncé, whose preferences include Brooklyn, her grill, and "being the hottest girl in the club". Beyoncé was inspired by the visuals of the 1990 David Fincher-directed video for George Michael's "Freedom" and she conceptualized of a "contemporary, street version" of the clip for "Yoncé". "Freedom" similarly featured the lip-sync performance of several contemporary supermodels.

Saiz wanted to keep the video mostly in the moment without much narrative; he said, "[I] wanted it to be more about the girls, doing the performance with Beyoncé taking a backseat as a kind of madam character"; in order to convey that idea, the singer does not sing the song's lyrics in the video. He envisioned the clip as being "sexy and provocative, but not so overt", leaning to more sophisticated visuals. In an interview with New York magazine, Saiz affirmed that there are many references to 1990s eroticism and the 1995 video for "Human Nature" by American singer Madonna in the clip for "Yoncé". Elaborating further on the video shoot, Saiz told BuzzFeed, "The girls were incredible. Everyone kind of checked whatever ego at the door and we were all there to make something fun and special." He described the cast as being "spontaneous and not at all contrived". Joan Smalls revealed during an interview that the crew did not follow a certain script while filming and added it was "up for interpretation" - she mentioned the scene where she licks Beyoncé's breast as her own idea, getting inspiration from the song's lyrics.

==== Synopsis and reception ====
The video for "Yoncé" opens with a close-up shot of a woman's mouth. Beyoncé and the models are dressed by Karen Langley in leather, fishnets, and straps as they pose against a brick wall, with cameras showing flashes of skin, close-ups of lips, and erotic tongue flicks. During one point in the video, Smalls is seen licking the singer's chest. In one scene, Beyoncé sports a molded bodysuit by Yves Saint Laurent with pierced nipples. During another scene, she is seen with denim shorts, a leather jacket with leopard-print sleeves and a necklace by All Saints Valtari. She is also seen wearing a cut-out orange bodysuit by Hervé Leger with a coat and heels. The clip ends with the singer walking on a runway with photographers taking pictures of her and shouting her name. The final scene was meant to be in line with the lyrics "Welcome to Paris" and help it transition to the song's second part, "Partition".

Allison Davis of New York magazine described the video for "Yoncé" as a "contemporary, gritty and voyeuristic" with "nineties-era eroticism and subtle sexuality", before summarizing the visual as "two minutes and four seconds of fashion and sex". Michael Zelenko of The Fader found a "hyper-sexualized vision of ruby-red lips, tongues, booty shorts and fish-net body suits" being presented in the clip. Conor Behan of The Independent dubbed "Yoncé" as a "street-wise update" of George Michael's "Freedom! '90". Entertainment Weekly writer Hillary Busis described the video as "super sexy" further praising the singer's showcased persona. Joanna Nikas from The New York Times described the look of the character Beyoncé portrayed in the video for the song as "[f]ierce". Whitney Phaneuf of the website HitFix noted its concept to be a street styled runway and concluded "The four women pose in gritty back alleys and against brick walls, projecting a tough and seductive image that matches the song." Nicole James of the website Fuse called the clip very "sexy". Erin Donnelly of the website Refinery29 deemed the clip one of the "sexiest offerings" by the singer yet. Lindsey Weber writing for Vulture noted that Beyoncé was hardly outshined by the models in the visual. Vanity Fair editor Michelle Collins praised the fact that the singer was brave enough to "surround herself with three of the world's most beautiful supermodels". A more mixed review came from Brent DiCrescenzo from Time Out magazine who remarked that the shooting for the video lasted only several hours.

=== "Partition" ===
==== Background and concept ====
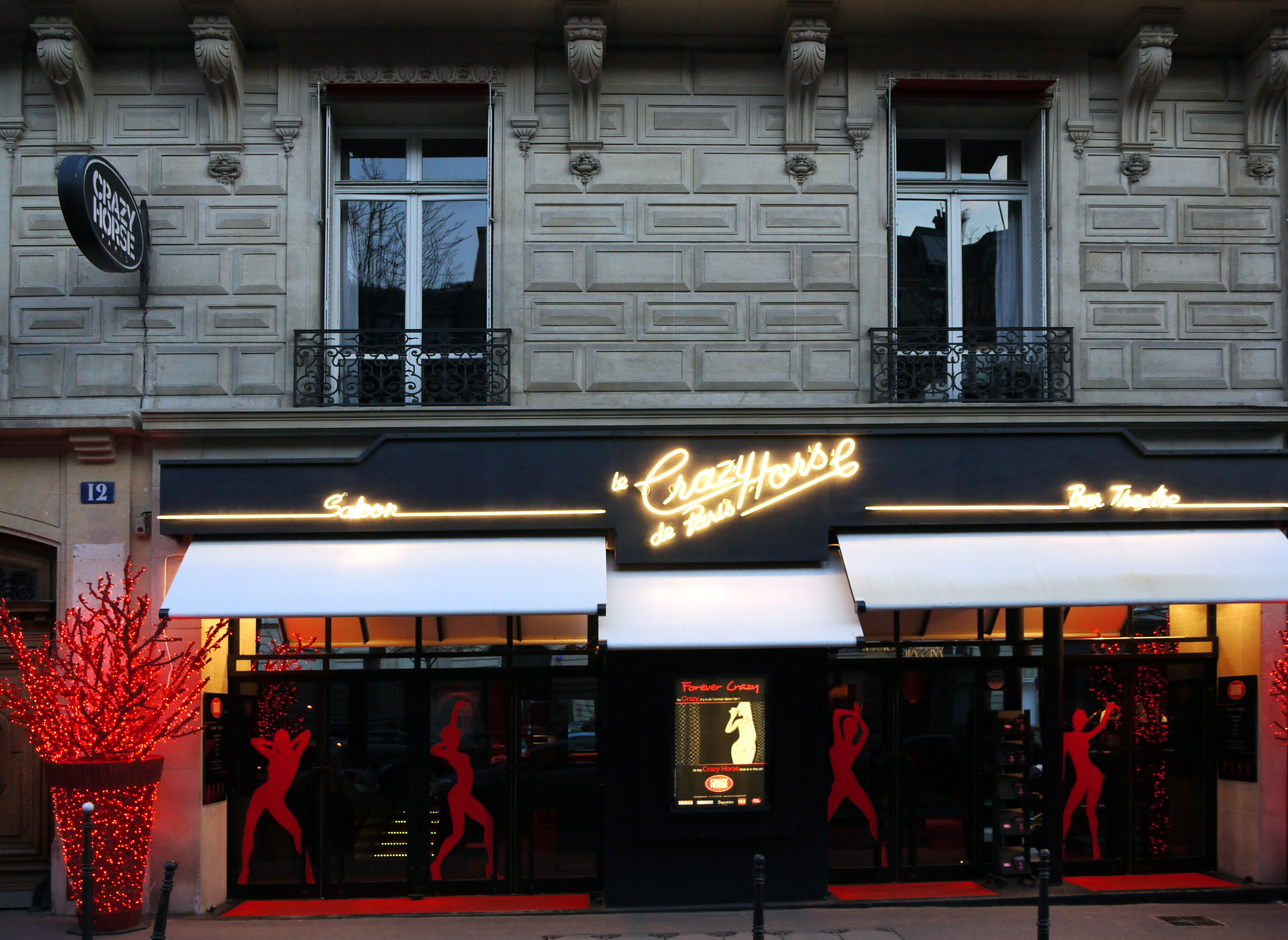
A street view of cabaret club Crazy Horse in Paris, where the video for "Partition" was filmed

The video for "Partition" was directed by Jake Nava and was shot at the Parisian cabaret club, Crazy Horse, with opening scenes filmed at the Château de Ferrières. Jay Z made a brief cameo in the video. It was filmed quickly as he had to travel to London for a concert after the shooting. In a video commentary to the album, Beyoncé said: "The day that I got engaged was my husband's birthday and I took him to Crazy Horse. And I remember thinking, 'Damn, these girls are fly.' I just thought it was the ultimate sexy show I've ever seen. And I was like, 'I wish I was up there, I wish I could perform that for my man...' So that's what I did for the video." Talking about the video, Nava noted that for the shooting Beyoncé was trying to be "even more risque than she's been in the past". While filming, he further tried to "create and capture a bit of genuine intimacy" between the singer and her husband. During a commentary about the video for the song, Beyoncé revealed her motivation to film it by saying,

"I was 195 pounds when I gave birth... I worked crazily to get my body back. I wanted to show my body. I wanted to show that you can have a child and you can work hard and you can get your body back. I know that there's so many women that feel the same thing after they give birth. You can have your child and you can still have fun and still be sexy and still have dreams and still live for yourself. I'm not embarrassed about it, and I don't feel like I have to protect that side of me because I do believe that sexuality is a power we all have."

==== Synopsis ====
The story of the video was meant to illustrate the lyrics of the song. It depicts the sexual fantasies of a rich and bored housewife played by Beyoncé who tries to seduce her man while having breakfast at her house wearing a white robe. The video opens with various shots of a big mansion in which the singer is seen in one of the rooms. She tries to get her man's attention while he reads a newspaper. As he does not notice her, she throws a napkin on the floor and her female servant comes to lift it. The clip transitions to scenes of Beyoncé dressed in a Victorian jeweled outfit with a mask in her hands, lip-syncing the lyrics and dancing to the rhythm of the song. Afterwards, she is seen entering a limousine in which Jay-Z is already inside. Scenes of Beyoncé with a black coat and lingerie walking in front of the car are also intertwined throughout.

The car stops in front of the club Crazy Horse. The following scenes show the singer emerging in a different set with a black background, as well as dancing atop a grand piano. Later, she is seen with female hands on her body as she dances seductively. Other scenes show her wearing lingerie and performing a pole dance with several other female dancers. Shortly afterwards, Beyoncé performs a silhouette choreographed chair dance across a purple background as Jay-Z is seen in the audience watching her while smoking a cigar. The end of the video shows the singer dancing with another woman next to her to a projected cheetah print. The last seconds cut to the breakfast table where Beyoncé is seen. For the video, the singer wears an archival corset by Christian Lacroix, lace gloves by Chanel, and a crystal mask by Atelier Swarovski.

==== Reception ====
In a video review, Jon Blistein from Rolling Stone described it as "extravagant, scintillating", further praising the dance moves. He concluded that the ending was in a classic "it-was-all-a-dream fashion" when the scenes cut back to the beginning. Melinda Newman, writing for HitFix described it as NSFW, highly stylized and a reclaim of the singer's sexuality. Whitney Phanuef of the same website praised the clip as the best on Beyoncé, further highlighting its "unforgettable song/video combination" accompanied with eroticism and Beyoncé's post-child sexuality. Melissa Locker, writing for Time stated that the singer went "properly XXX" for the "hot" clip and added that it would make viewers think differently about the word "peaches". Edwin Ortiz of Complex felt that during the various wardrobe changes, each outfit was better than the previous. Ashley Lee from The Hollywood Reporter classified the visual as "ornate" and opined that Beyoncé portrayed an aristocrat daydreaming about affection. Similarly, Michael Zelenko of The Fader described her character as an aristocrat "in desperate need of physical attention" and noted similarities with the film True Lies in the strip scene. John Boone from E! Online praised the overall sexiness of the video and the singer's look in various scenes. Hailing the video "steamy", Dan Reilly of Spin noted the variety of revealing outfits worn by Beyoncé and concluded "[t]here's no nudity, but the video certainly comes close". Writing on behalf of Vanity Fair, Michelle Collins stated in her review, "If you're a fan of gorgeously choreographed burlesque routines, as well as women in their thirties who defy the logic of cellulite, 'Partition' is a good starting off point in your journey through Beyoncé's 'Beyoncé.'" Alice Newbold of The Daily Telegraph hailed the explicit nature of the video stating how it showed Beyoncé as "one sassy lady on a mission to show she's back in the game".

Conor Behan of The Independent qualified the clip as being "effortlessly sexy". Jon Dolan of Rolling Stone described the video for the song as the most NSFW from the album. Brent DiCrescenzo of Time Out referred to the clip for "Partition" as a classic MTV video. A more negative review came from The Verge's Trent Wolbe who panned Nava's contribution to the album as uninteresting. The Daily Telegraph writer Sarah Crompton stated that the video looked suitable for a porn website and described its imagery as "strip club dressed up as a Busby Berkeley musical". Crompton went on to call the message the video sent "peculiar" and added that the singer should try to become a better role model for young girls. Vivienne Pattison of Mediawatch-uk commented that such visuals showed that Beyoncé had "sold out" and undermined her position as a "role model" and previous "powerful messages that empowered women and girls". In early March 2014, Bill O'Reilly criticized the video for "Partition" during his show The O'Reilly Factor broadcast on Fox News. He said that it represented glorification of sex in the back of a limousine and offered critique that teenage girls are influenced by the singer, adding, "Why would she do it when she knows the devastation that unwanted pregnancies... and fractured families [...] I think Beyoncé, what she has done here, is inexplicable". In response to these claims, Rutger University's Kevin Allred argues that "Beyonce isn’t sensationalizing her own body and putting it on display for viewers to gawk at. Rather, she performs the historical objectification of black female bodies and replays that objectification in order to point out that, stereotypically, black women have had few means of garnering attention beyond sexual performances. She goes so far as forcing the viewer to be complicit in this objectification by positioning them as the direct viewer of the show she is enacting." The video was nominated in the category for Video of the Year at the 2014 BET Awards. At the 2014 MTV Video Music Awards it was nominated in the categories for Best Choreography and Best Female Video.

== Live performances ==
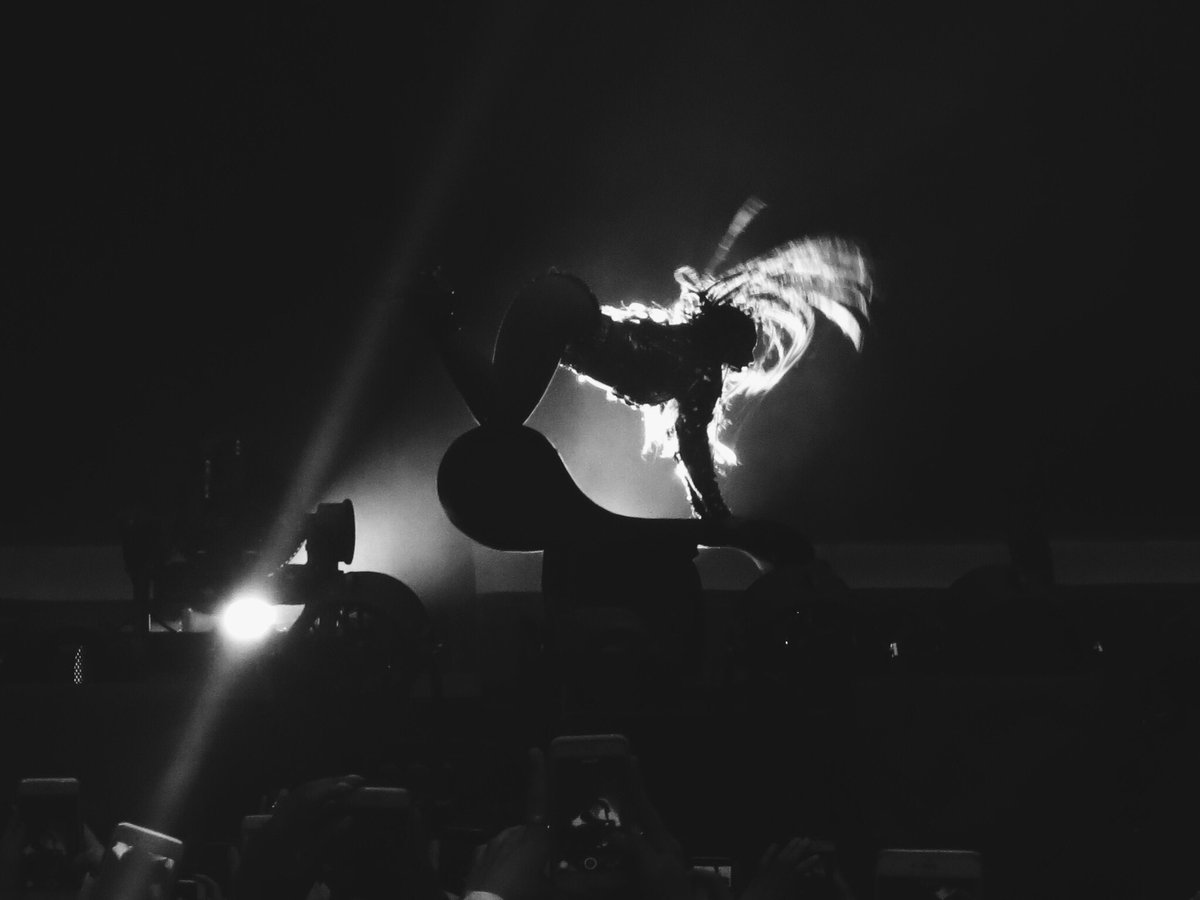
Beyoncé performing a chair dance choreography at The Formation World Tour during "Partition"

Both "Yoncé" and "Partition" were part of the setlist of the second European leg of The Mrs. Carter Show World Tour with the first performance of both tracks taking place in Glasgow at the SSE Hydro arena on February 20, 2014. During the performance of the songs, Beyoncé performed similar choreographies to the ones seen in the music videos of the songs with her background dancers. The end of "Partition" saw Beyoncé appearing with a silhouette, dancing on a couch. While reviewing one of the concerts of the tour, Robert Copsey from Digital Spy noted that the chair dance performed during "Partition" was the dancing highlight of the show. Graeme Virtue of The Guardian felt that "Partition" along with "Blow" and "Naughty Girl", "make[s] a persuasive case for Mrs Carter, the unstoppable sex machine". BBC News' Mark Savage felt that "her new material [from Beyoncé] showcases an unparalleled variety of vocal styles, ranges and phrasing" during the concert, something he noticed in the "urban swagger" of "Yoncé".

"Partition" and "Yoncé" were part of the setlist of Beyoncé and Jay-Z's co-headlining On the Run Tour (2014) where both of the songs were performed separately. The performance of "Partition" opened with a new half-minute explicit rap verse sung by Jay-Z seated as crimson light illuminated him. After he finished his part, Beyoncé appeared on stage in front of a digital screen dancing along with her female dancers on stripper poles. Consequence of Sound's Alex Young chose the song as one of the particular highlights of the show. A pre-recorded performance from that tour was broadcast at the 2014 BET Awards on June 29, 2014. Lily Harrison of E! Online felt that the pair "certainly brought the house down with their sexy performance" while praising Beyoncé's look and accurately performed choreography. Maurice Bobb on behalf of MTV News felt that the BET Awards "saved the best for last" and described the performance as "exciting" despite being pre-recorded. Adam Fleischer of the same publication felt that the rapper was "sprinkling his classic Jay flair all over" in his verse during the performance. Spin editor Colin Joyce found the duo's delivery of the song to be "stunning". In 2016, "Partition" and "Yoncé" were part of the setlist during The Formation World Tour. "Partition" was also part of the setlist of the Renaissance World Tour, and "Yoncé" was played in an interlude.

"Partition" and "Yoncé" were both performed by Beyoncé at the 2014 MTV Video Music Awards on August 25 as part of a medley consisting of songs from her fifth studio album; she appeared wearing a bejeweled bodysuit and performed a dance choreography on a pole for the former song; "Yoncé" was performed later during her set. HitFix writer Melinda Newman noted that the performance of "Partition" emulated looks and poses from its clip. Nadeska Alexis from MTV News felt that the singer kept the audience "lifted" with the performance of "Yoncé". In a review of her performance, Hilary Hughes of Fuse noted the performance "elicited nothing but chills and rapturous screams".

== Cover versions ==
On January 9, 2014, Azealia Banks posted an unofficial remix of the song to her SoundCloud account, featuring Busta Rhymes. Their remix of the song has an extended intro lasting 90 seconds with the rappers singing "dirty" bars. Reviewers were critical of Rhymes' contribution to the remix, with Spin's Marc Hogan calling it "conventionally porny", and Hayden Manders of Refinery29 suggesting it "take[s] the tease of the original's writing and turn[s] it into sleaze." Banks' effort was contrastingly hailed for "delivering the ratatat wordplay that brought her to acclaim while wisely avoiding trying to beat either of the track's other artists for sheer bawdiness" by Hogan and "working perfectly with the deep, subdued beat of Beyoncé's original" by Carolyn Menyes from the website Music Times.

Upon the release of the album and "Partition", the song has been covered by multiple dance crews on YouTube. Writing for Billboard, William Gruger and Jason Lipshutz thought that the dance videos uploaded to YouTube helped "Partition" to appear on charts such as the Hot 100, although there were no official videos released as well as the audio was not available via digital retailers such as Spotify or Pandora. They further compared "Partition" to "Harlem Shake", which performed well on charts due to viral videos, later created the meme with the same name. However they also noted the differences that "Partition" was mostly covered by professional choreographers, unlike "Harlem Shake". On March 13, 2014, Vanessa Hudgens posted a video where she performed a choreography for "Yoncé" by Michelle "Jersey" Maniscalco, along with four female dancers.

== Credits and personnel ==
Credits adapted from Beyoncé's website.

Song credits

- Beyoncé – vocals, production, vocal production
- Timbaland – production
- Jerome Harmon – production
- Justin Timberlake – production, background vocals
- Key Wane – production
- Mike Dean – additional production
- Boots – additional production
- Stuart White – recording, mixing
- Chris Godbey – recording
- Ann Mincieli – recording
- Bart Schoudel – recording
- Ramon Rivas – second engineering
- Matt Weber – assistant engineering
- Terius "The Dream" Nash – background vocals
- Niles Hollowell-Dhar – additional synth sounds
- Derek Dixie – additional synth sounds, mix consultation
- Hajiba Fahmy – spoken words recording
- Tony Maserati – mixing
- James Krausse – mix engineering
- Justin Hergett – assistant mix engineering
- Chris Tabron – assistant mix engineering
- Matt Wiggers – assistant mix engineering
- Tom Coyne – mastering
- Aya Merrill – mastering

Video credits

"Yoncé"

- Featuring: Jourdan Dunn, Chanel Iman, Joan Smalls
- Director: Ricky Saiz
- Creative Director: Todd Tourso
- Director of Photography: Jackson Hunt
- Executive Producer: Jonathan Lia
- Producers: Christopher Kublan, Tamsin Glasson
- Production Company: Good Company, Colonel Blimp
- Stylist: Lysa Cooper, Karen Langley
- Additional Styling: TY Hunter, Raquel Smith, Tim White
- Art Director: Ruth Crawford
- Editors: Adam "Zuk" Zuckerman, Alexander Hammer
- Brand Manager: Melissa Vargas
- Hair: Nikki Nelms, Neal Farinah
- Make-Up: Francesca Tolot, Sir John
- Color Correction: Tom Poole for C03
- V FX: The Artery
- Photography: Mason Poole, Robin Harper, Yorsa El-Essawy

"Partition"

- Featuring: Jay-Z, Crazy Horse Paris, and The Crazy Horse Dancers
- Director: Jake Nava
- Director of Photography: Paul Laufer
- Executive Producer: Erinn Williams
- Producer: Benedict Cooper
- Production Company: Cherry Films, Parkwood Entertainment
- Choreography: Svettlana Kostantinova, Philippe Decoufle
- Additional Choreography: Danielle Polanco, Frank Gatson
- Dancers: Dekka Dance, Kim Gingras, Diane De Longchamps, Veus Oceane, Gloria Di Parma, Candy St Louis, Trauma Tease, Fasty Wizz, Zula Zazou
- Stylist: B. Åkerlund
- Additional Styling: TY Hunter, Raquel Smith, Tim White
- Art Directors: Arnaud Putman, Renaud Deschamps
- Editor: Alexander Hammer
- Brand Manager: Melissa Vargas
- Hair: Neal Farinah
- Make-Up: Francesca Tolot
- Color Correction: Ron Sudul for Nice Shoes
- V FX: The Artery
- Assistant Editor: Joe Sinopoli
- Photography: Robin Harper

== Charts ==
=== Weekly charts ===
Chart (2014)	Peak position
Belgium (Ultratip Bubbling Under Flanders)	2
Belgium Urban (Ultratop Flanders)	12
Belgium (Ultratip Bubbling Under Wallonia)	9
Canada Hot 100 (Billboard)	100
France (SNEP)	120
Ireland (IRMA)	57
Scottish Singles Sales (Official Charts)	78
South Korea (Gaon International Chart)	128
UK Singles (Official Charts)	74
UK Hip Hop/R&B (Official Charts)	12
US Billboard Hot 100	23
US Dance Club Songs (Billboard)	1
US Hot R&B/Hip-Hop Songs (Billboard)	9
US R&B/Hip-Hop Airplay (Billboard)	3
US Rhythmic Airplay (Billboard)	7

=== Year-end charts ===
Chart (2014)	Position
Belgium (Ultratop Flanders Urban)	40
US Billboard Hot 100	95
US Hot Dance Club Songs (Billboard)	14
US Hot R&B/Hip-Hop Songs (Billboard)	21
US Rhythmic (Billboard)	29

== Certifications ==
Certifications for "Yoncé"
Region	Certification	Certified units/sales
Australia (ARIA) Homecoming Live Version	Gold	35,000^{‡}
^{‡} Sales+streaming figures based on certification alone.

Certifications for "Partition"
Region	Certification	Certified units/sales
Australia (ARIA)	3× Platinum	210,000^{‡}
Brazil (Pro-Música Brasil)	3× Platinum	180,000^{‡}
Canada (Music Canada)	2× Platinum	160,000^{‡}
Denmark (IFPI Danmark)	Gold	45,000^{‡}
New Zealand (RMNZ)	2× Platinum	60,000^{‡}
United Kingdom (BPI)	Platinum	600,000^{‡}
United States (RIAA)	5× Platinum	5,000,000^{‡}
^{‡} Sales+streaming figures based on certification alone.

== See also ==
- List of number-one dance singles of 2014 (U.S.)
