= Dark Sky Paradise =

Studio album by Big Sean
- Released: February 24, 2015
- Studios: Doe; Record Plant; Yolo Estate (Los Angeles); Glenwood Place (Burbank); No Name (Malibu); Orange Room (Atlanta); S.O.T.A. (Toronto)
- Genre: Hip hop
- Length: 49:57
- Labels: GOOD; Def Jam
- Producers: Amaire Johnson; Da Internz; DJ Dahi; DJ Mustard; Jay John Henry; Kanye West; Key Wane; L&F; Mike Dean; Mike Will Made It; RobGotBeats; T-Minus; Vinylz

Big Sean chronology
| Hall of Fame (2013) | Dark Sky Paradise (2015) | Twenty88 (2016) |

Deluxe edition cover

Singles from Dark Sky Paradise
- 1. "I Don't Fuck with You" Released: September 19, 2014; 2. "Paradise" Released: October 7, 2014; 3. "Blessings" Released: January 30, 2015; 4. "One Man Can Change the World" Released: June 19, 2015; 5. "Play No Games" Released: September 22, 2015

Dark Sky Paradise is the third studio album by American rapper Big Sean. It was released on February 24, 2015, by GOOD Music and Def Jam Recordings. The album features guest appearances from Drake, Kanye West, E-40, Chris Brown, Ty Dolla Sign, Jhené Aiko, Lil Wayne, John Legend, PartyNextDoor, and Ariana Grande, while the production was handled by a variety of collaborators, including Kanye West, DJ Mustard, DJ Dahi and Key Wane, who also serves as the album's executive producer alongside Big Sean himself. The album was supported by five singles: "I Don't Fuck with You", "Paradise", "Blessings", "One Man Can Change the World" and "Play No Games".

Dark Sky Paradise received generally positive reviews from critics, who praised the change in Sean's production and lyricism being more atmospheric and substance-filled. The album debuted at number one on the US Billboard 200, earning 173,000 album-equivalent units in its first week. In August 2020, the album was certified double platinum by the Recording Industry Association of America (RIAA).

== Singles ==
The album's lead single, "I Don't Fuck with You" featuring E-40, was released on September 19, 2014. The song peaked at number 11 on the US Billboard Hot 100. It was certified diamond by Recording Industry Association of America on July 15, 2026.

The album's second single, "Paradise", was released on October 7, 2014. The song peaked at number 99 on the Billboard Hot 100.

The album's third single, "Blessings" featuring Drake and Kanye West, was released on January 30, 2015. The song peaked at number 28 on the Billboard Hot 100.

"One Man Can Change the World" featuring Kanye West and John Legend, was sent to rhythmic contemporary radio on June 19, 2015, as the album's fourth single. The song peaked at number 82 on the Billboard Hot 100.

"Play No Games" featuring Chris Brown and Ty Dolla Sign, was sent to urban contemporary radio on September 22, 2015, as the album's fifth single. The song peaked at number 84 on the Billboard Hot 100.

== Critical reception ==
Professional ratings
Aggregate scores
| Source | Rating |
|---|---|
| AnyDecentMusic? | 6.4/10 |
| Metacritic | 72/100 |
Review scores
| Source | Rating |
| AllMusic | 4/5 stars |
| Billboard | 4/5 stars |
| Complex | 4/5 stars |
| Entertainment Weekly | B+ |
| Exclaim! | 7/10 |
| HipHopDX | 4.0/5 |
| Pitchfork | 7.1/10 |
| Rolling Stone | 3/5 stars |
| Spin | 6/10 |
| XXL | 4/5 |

Dark Sky Paradise was met with generally positive reviews. At Metacritic, which assigns a normalized rating out of 100 to reviews from professional publications, the album received an average score of 72, based on 19 reviews. Aggregator AnyDecentMusic? gave it 6.4 out of 10, based on their assessment of the critical consensus.

In a review for Exclaim!, Samantha O'Connor noted that "stormier production and moodier lyricism replace Sean's predictable sunny wordplay and pop culture puns", further concluding that "Big Sean has reached a personal high by finding his Dark Sky Paradise, and it's his honesty that takes listeners there with him". David Jeffries of AllMusic said, "Artistically, three is the charm Big Sean as Dark Sky Paradise is much more expansive than previous efforts, sometimes grinding with executive producer Kanye West's love of the dark, and other times bouncing with the snark, swagger, and style that propelled this Detroit rapper to the top". John Kennedy of Billboard said, "With sterling wordplay and a consistent melancholy vibe, the Detroit native took all the tension, the highs and lows, and laid it out on wax, compiling the strongest project of his career". Justin Charity of Complex said, "Occasionally clumsy but wonderfully plainspoken, and impassioned when he wants to be, Sean has advanced (if not graduated) from the tepid mythmaking of Hall of Fame. Here he's dynamic, and a pretty good rapper". Eric Diep of HipHopDX said, "With Dark Sky Paradise, Big Sean is prepared to leave his mark".

Kyle Anderson of Entertainment Weekly said, "A spirited combination of grown-man statement-making and round-the-way bull". Jon Caramanica of The New York Times said, "In the last year, he's made real strides toward lucidity, and on Dark Sky Paradise, his third and best album, he is more human than ever before". Jordan Sargent of Pitchfork said, "Dark Sky Paradise is a big leap in the direction of the ideal Big Sean full-length". Dan Rys of XXL said, "'One Man Can Change the World' in particular, which deals with the loss of his grandmother and his acceptance of her death, really underlines what the entire work is about: dealing with the ups and downs in life and figuring out the best way to accept them and move forward. With Dark Sky Paradise, Big Sean has finally found that balance". Michael Madden of Consequence said, "Mostly, though, Dark Sky Paradise is an ambitious tasteful album from a rapper who's often viewed as neither". Dan Weiss of Spin said, "More of the same, really, and what same is that anyway? His beats, hooks and musicality tread slightly above water". Christopher R. Weingarten of Rolling Stone stated, "His third and best record isn't that moment yet, but he's one step closer".

=== Year-end lists ===
Select year-end rankings of Dark Sky Paradise
| Publication | List | Rank | Ref. |
|---|---|---|---|
| Billboard | 25 Best Albums of 2015 | 15 | |
| Billboard | 10 Best Hip Hop Albums of 2015 | 5 | |
| Idolator | 15 Favorite Albums of 2015 | 11 | |
| Stereogum | 40 Best Rap Albums of 2015 | 37 | |
| Variance | 50 Best Albums of 2015 | 22 | |

=== Industry awards ===
Awards and nominations for Dark Sky Paradise
| Year | Ceremony | Category | Result | Ref. |
|---|---|---|---|---|
| 2015 | BET Hip Hop Awards | Album of the Year | Nominated | |

== Commercial performance ==
Dark Sky Paradise debuted at number one on the US Billboard 200, with 173,000 album-equivalent units (including 139,000 copies as pure albums sales) in its first week. This became Sean's first US number one debut and his highest first week sales to date. In its second week, the album dropped to number six on the chart, earning an additional 58,000 units. In its third week, the album dropped to number ten on the chart, earning 38,000 more units. By the end of 2015, Dark Sky Paradise was ranked as the 22nd most popular album of the year on the Billboard 200. On August 19, 2020, the album was certified double platinum by the Recording Industry Association of America (RIAA) for combined sales, streaming and track-sales equivalent of two million units in the United States.

== Track listing ==
Dark Sky Paradise track listing
| No. | Title | Writer(s) | Producer(s) | Length |
|---|---|---|---|---|
| 1. | "Dark Sky (Skyscrapers)" | Sean Anderson; Robert Harris | RobGotBeats | 2:58 |
| 2. | "Blessings" (featuring Drake) | Anderson; Anderson Hernandez; Allen Ritter; Aubrey Drake Graham | Vinylz; Ritter^{[a]} | 4:12 |
| 3. | "All Your Fault" (featuring Kanye West) | Anderson; Kanye West; Welbon Morris Jr.; Nashiem Myrick; Emmanuel Nickerson; Noah Goldstein; Terius Nash; David Pack^{[c]}; Lee Stone | West; OGWebbie^{[a]}; Myrick^{[b]}; Mano^{[b]}; Goldstein^{[b]} | 3:44 |
| 4. | "I Don't Fuck with You" (featuring E-40) | Anderson; Dijon McFarlane; West; Mikely Adam; Dacoury Natche; Dwane Weir II; Willie Hansbro; Earl T. Stevens; D. J. Rogers^{[d]} | DJ Mustard; West; Mike Free^{[b]}; DJ Dahi^{[b]}; Key Wane^{[b]} | 4:44 |
| 5. | "Play No Games" (featuring Chris Brown and Ty Dolla Sign) | Anderson; Weir; Justin Miles Johnson; Chris Brown; Tyrone Griffin Jr; Gene Griffin^{[e]}; Timothy Gatling^{[e]}; Aaron Hall^{[e]}; Edward T. Riley^{[e]} | Key Wane; Jay John Henry | 3:36 |
| 6. | "Paradise" (extended) | Anderson; Michael L. Williams II; Hansbro; Marquel Middlebrooks | Mike Will Made It | 3:35 |
| 7. | "Win Some, Lose Some" | Anderson; Tyler Williams; Matthew Samuels; Jhené Aiko Chilombo | T-Minus; Boi-1da^{[a]} | 5:04 |
| 8. | "Stay Down" | Anderson; Ernest Clark; Marcos Palacios; Kevin Randolph; Uforo Ebong; Christopher Umana; West | Da Internz; L&F | 4:10 |
| 9. | "I Know" (featuring Jhené Aiko) | Anderson; McFarlane; Weir; Chilombo | DJ Mustard; Key Wane | 5:20 |
| 10. | "Deep" (featuring Lil Wayne) | Anderson; McFarlane; Weir; Dwayne Carter | DJ Mustard; Key Wane | 4:35 |
| 11. | "One Man Can Change the World" (featuring Kanye West and John Legend) | Anderson; Amaire Johnson; West; John Stephens; Mike Dean; McFarlane; William Roberts^{[f]}; Brian Wright; Kenneth Lewis | Johnson | 4:14 |
| 12. | "Outro" | Anderson; Natche; William Pulliam^{[g]}; John Tanner^{[g]}; Towa Tei; Gilberto Oliveira; Kamaal Fareed^{[h]}; Ali Jones-Muhammad^{[h]}; Malik Taylor^{[h]}; James Yancey^{[h]} | DJ Dahi | 3:43 |
| Total length: | | | | 49:57 |

Deluxe edition (bonus tracks)
| No. | Title | Writer(s) | Producer(s) | Length |
|---|---|---|---|---|
| 13. | "Deserve It" (featuring PartyNextDoor) | Anderson; Jahron Anthony Brathwaite | PartyNextDoor | 4:21 |
| 14. | "Research" (featuring Ariana Grande) | Anderson; Natche; Leland Wayne; Ariana Grande; Michael Carson; Hansbro | DJ Dahi; Metro Boomin^{[b]} | 3:50 |
| 15. | "Platinum and Wood" | Anderson; Weir; Ismail Abdul-Aziz | Key Wane | 2:43 |
| Total length: | | | | 60:51 |

Notes

- ^{^[a]} signifies a co-producer
- ^{^[b]} signifies an additional producer

Sample credits

- ^{^[c]} "All Your Fault" contains a sample from "How Much I Feel", written by David Pack and performed by Ambrosia.
- ^{^[d]} "I Don't Fuck with You" contains elements from "Say You Love Me, One More Time", written and performed by D. J. Rogers.
- ^{^[e]} "Play No Games" contains a sample from "Piece of My Love", written by Timothy Gatling, Gene Griffin, Aaron Hall, and Edward T. Riley, as performed by Guy.
- ^{^[f]} "One Man Can Change the World" contains an interpolation from "Sanctified", written by William Roberts, Kanye West, Sean Anderson, and Dijon McFarlane, as performed by Rick Ross featuring Kanye West and Big Sean.
- ^{^[g]} "Outro" contains elements from "Didn't I", written by William Pulliam and John Tanner, as performed by Darondo; ^{^[h]} and an interpolation from "Find a Way", written by Ali Shaheed Muhammad, James Yancy, Kamaal Fareed, and Malik Taylor, as performed by A Tribe Called Quest.
- "Platinum and Wood" contains an interpolation from "Come Roll", performed by Blade Icewood.

== Personnel ==
Credits adapted from the album's liner notes and Tidal.

Musicians

- Amaire Johnson – keyboards (1), piano (11)
- Gregg Rominiecki – additional vocals (1)
- Allison Porter – background vocals (2)
- Jahaan Sweet – background vocals (2)
- Jake Nelson – background vocals (2)
- Michael St. Peter – background vocals (2)
- Sophia Kaminski – background vocals (2)
- Travis Scott – additional vocals (3)
- Jhené Aiko – additional vocals (7)
- DJ Dahi – background vocals (7, 9)
- Kanye West – additional vocals (8)
- Tilthony Daniels – sound effects (8)
- Key Wane – background vocals (9, 10)
- Nicole Lequerica – background vocals (9, 10)
- Natasha Bedingfield – background vocals (11)

Technical

- Gregg Rominiecki – mixer (1, 11), recording engineer (all tracks)
- Gadget – mixer (2)
- Rob Kinelski – mixer (3–5, 12, 14)
- Jaycen Joshua – mixer (6, 9, 10)
- Stan Greene – mixer (7, 8, 13, 15)
- Maximilian Jaeger – mixer (11), recording engineer (1, 3–14)
- Noah Shebib – recording engineer (2)
- Noel Cadastre – recording engineer (2)
- Noah Goldstein – recording engineer (3)
- Miguel Maloles – recording engineer (4)
- John Kercy – recording engineer (10)
- Fabio Patrignani – recording engineer (11)
- Gregg Morrison – assistant mixer (2)
- David Baker – assistant mixer (4, 5, 12, 14)
- Maddox Chhim – assistant mixer (6, 9, 10)
- Ryan Kaul – assistant mixer (6, 9, 10)
- Gregg Moffet – assistant recording engineer (2)
- Jesse Germano – assistant recording engineer (11)

== Charts ==
=== Weekly charts ===
Chart performance for Dark Sky Paradise
| Chart (2015) | Peak position |
|---|---|
| Australian Albums (ARIA) | 28 |
| Australian Urban Albums (ARIA) | 5 |
| Austrian Albums (Ö3 Austria) | 70 |
| Belgian Albums (Ultratop Flanders) | 88 |
| Belgian Albums (Ultratop Wallonia) | 85 |
| Canadian Albums (Billboard) | 5 |
| Danish Albums (Hitlisten) | 29 |
| French Albums (SNEP) | 136 |
| German Albums (Offizielle Top 100) | 76 |
| New Zealand Albums (RMNZ) | 23 |
| Norwegian Albums (VG-lista) | 30 |
| Swedish Albums (Sverigetopplistan) | 39 |
| Swiss Albums (Schweizer Hitparade) | 41 |
| US Billboard 200 | 1 |
| US Top R&B/Hip-Hop Albums (Billboard) | 1 |

=== Year-end charts ===
2015 year-end chart performance for Dark Sky Paradise
| Chart (2015) | Position |
|---|---|
| US Billboard 200 | 22 |
| US Top R&B/Hip-Hop Albums (Billboard) | 10 |

2016 year-end chart performance for Dark Sky Paradise
| Chart (2016) | Position |
|---|---|
| US Billboard 200 | 105 |

== Certifications ==
Certifications and sales for Dark Sky Paradise
| Region | Certification | Certified units/sales |
|---|---|---|
| Denmark (IFPI Danmark) | Gold | 10,000^{‡} |
| New Zealand (RMNZ) | Platinum | 15,000^{‡} |
| United Kingdom (BPI) | Silver | 60,000^{‡} |
| United States (RIAA) | 2× Platinum | 2,000,000^{‡} |
^{‡} Sales+streaming figures based on certification alone.
