= Detroit (mixtape) =

Mixtape by Big Sean
- Released: September 5, 2012
- Recorded: 2011–12
- Genre: Hip-hop
- Length: 61:31
- Label: GOOD; Def Jam
- Producer: BP; Don Cannon; Da Internz; Hit-Boy; KeY Wane; Lex Luger; Million $ Mano; Rami Beatz; Dez; Southside; The Olympicks; Young Chop

Big Sean chronology
Finally Famous (2011)	Detroit (2012)	Hall of Fame (2013)

Detroit is the fourth mixtape by American rapper Big Sean. It was released for free download on September 5, 2012, by GOOD Music. Detroit features guest appearances from fellow rappers such as J. Cole, Juicy J, King Chip, French Montana, Royce da 5'9", Kendrick Lamar and Tyga, along with track narrations by Common, Young Jeezy and Snoop Lion. Wale and Wiz Khalifa are also featured in the bonus tracks. American singers including Chris Brown, Jhené Aiko, James Fauntleroy and Mike Posner also make guest appearances on the mixtape. Production is by Hit-Boy, Da Internz, 808 Mafia's own producers Lex Luger and Southside and KeY Wane, among others. The mixtape primarily consisted of these completed original songs.

Detroit caused the mixtape site DatPiff to crash upon the mixtape's eventual release. It was viewed 1.5 million times on the day of release and was downloaded close to 700,000—with 500,000 downloads within three hours. Detroit has been downloaded over a million times. In 2020, Big Sean released a sequel to the mixtape titled Detroit 2, as his fifth studio album. In 2022, he re-released the mixtape on streaming platforms. On April 18, 2026, it will be re-released as a 7", 2-LP limited edition vinyl set for Record Store Day, making it available on vinyl for the first time.

== Background ==
On August 20, 2012, Big Sean first announced the mixtape via Twitter and a YouTube video, titled "Big Sean Mixtape Announcement 2012". Big Sean released three song previews in the shape of short music videos as promotion before the mixtape release; "How It Feel" on August 21, "24 Karats of Gold" on August 28 and "RWT" on September 4. Sean paid for the expenses of the videos himself. The title of the mixtape pays homage to Sean's hometown of Detroit.

== Reception and accolades ==
Detroit received widespread critical acclaim from music critics and fans, who hailed it as Sean's best work. The mixtape was named the 26th best album of 2012 by Complex magazine. It also won Best Mixtape at the 2013 BET Hip Hop Awards. The mixtape arrived on streaming platforms in 2022 for its 10th anniversary.

== Track listing ==
No.	Title	Writer(s)	Producer(s)	Length
1.	"Higher"	Sean Anderson; Dwane Weir II; Kanye West; Reggie Williams; Tauheed Epps; Terrence Thornton; John Stephens; Winston Riley; James Thomas; Anthony Khan; Denzie Hugh Beagle; Herbert Turner; Malik Jones; Stephan Taft; Wilbert Williams; Willie Hansbro; Michael Dean	KeY Wane	3:50
2.	"24 Karats of Gold" (featuring J. Cole)	Anderson; Jermaine Cole; Weir II; Aaron O'Bryant; Kurt Walker; David Franklin Reeves	KeY Wane	3:42
3.	"Story by Common" (performed by Common)	Anderson; Lonnie Lynn; James Poyser		1:30
4.	"How It Feel"	Anderson; Emmanuel Nickerson; Alexander Izquierdo; Paul Politi; Barry White	Mano	3:39
5.	"Woke Up" (featuring Say It Ain't Tone, Earlly Mac, Mike Posner and James Fauntleroy)	Anderson; Tyree Pittman; Weir II; Brian Parker; Mike Posner; James Fauntleroy; Earl Taylor; Hansbro	Young Chop; KeY Wane; BPTheProducer	4:44
6.	"Experimental" (featuring Juicy J and King Chip)	Anderson; Jordan Houston; Charles Worth; Rami Eadeh; Desmond Peterson	Ramii Beatz; Benny Wond3r	4:34
7.	"Mula" (featuring French Montana)	Anderson; Karim Kharbouch; Pittman; Izquierdo	Young Chop	4:06
8.	"Story by Young Jeezy" (performed by Young Jeezy)	Anderson; Jay Jenkins; Poyser		1:51
9.	"100" (featuring Royce da 5'9", Kendrick Lamar and James Fauntleroy)	Anderson; Ryan Montgomery; Kendrick Duckworth; Donald Cannon; Fauntleroy; Jean-Michel Jarre	Don Cannon	5:36
10.	"Sellin' Dreams" (featuring Chris Brown)	Anderson; Chris Brown; Ernest Clark; Marcos Palacios; Izquierdo	Da Internz	3:06
11.	"I'm Gonna Be" (featuring Jhené Aiko)	Anderson; Jhené Chilombo; Weir II	KeY Wane	3:05
12.	"FFOE"	Anderson; Lexus Lewis; Izquierdo; Jonathan Smith; Stefan Gordy; Skyler Gordy; Eric DeLaTorre	Lex Luger	4:10
13.	"Do What I Gotta Do" (featuring Tyga)		Mano; The Olympicks; Rob Kinelski	2:35
14.	"Story by Snoop Lion" (performed by Snoop Lion)	Anderson; Calvin Broadus, Jr.; Poyser		1:31
15.	"RWT"	Anderson; Joshua Luellen; Weir II; Izquierdo	Southside; KeY Wane	2:19
16.	"Once Bitten, Twice Shy"	Anderson; Chauncey Hollis; Marques Hutchison	Hit-Boy; M3rge	4:46

Bonus tracks
No.	Title	Writer(s)	Producer(s)	Length
17.	"Life Should Go On" (featuring Wale)	Anderson; Olubowale Akintimehin; Weir II; Izquierdo; Roger Nichols; Paul Williams	KeY Wane	3:06
18.	"All I Know" (featuring Wiz Khalifa)	Anderson; Cameron Thomaz; Nickerson; Gordon Moakes; Matthew Chee Hung Tong; Russell Lissack; Rowland Kelechukwu	Mano	3:21
Total length:				67:58

Detroit streaming version
No.	Title	Writer(s)	Producer(s)	Length
3.	"More Thoughts (2019)"	Anderson; Weir II; Amaire Johnson; Lawrence Lamont Jenkins; Esperanza Spalding	KeY Wane; Johnson; Lawrence Lamont	2:53
Total length:				67:58

Notes

- On the original release, "Life Should Go On" and "All I Know" are put together on one track but are separated in the table.
- "Higher" contains a sample from "Mercy", written by Kanye West, Sean Anderson, Terrence Thornton, Tauheed Epps, Michael Williams II, Ross Birchard, Mike Dean, Anthony Khan, Stepan Taft, James Thomas, Denzie Beagle, Winston Riley and Reggie Williams, as performed by Kanye West featuring Big Sean, Pusha T and 2 Chainz; and samples from "Prelude", written and performed by John Legend.
- "Do What I Gotta Do" does not appear in the streaming version.
- "24K of Gold" interpolates lyrics from "If I Ruled the World (Imagine That)" by Nas.
- "How It Feel" contains a slight change in lyrics on the streaming version.
- "More Thoughts (2019)" contains a sample from "Fall In", written and performed by Esperanza Spalding.
