= The A'z =

American hip hop group

- Origin: Oakland, California
- Genres: hip hop, rap
- Labels: TVT Records
- Members: A.E., Speedy, ICE

The A'z are a Bay Area music group that have developed a music style mixing rap, hip hop, rock, and other sounds and tracks. All members of the group have the government issued name "Alex", and thus took on the name "The A'z" because of their first initial. The A'z members use professional or artistic name's, which are "A.E", "ICE", and "Speedy". Formerly known as the group 4 Deep, they surfaced on the Bay Area rap scene back in 1997 and quickly became the first hyphy trio to be aired on Bay Area radio stations. As a result of their surging young fan base they became recognized as "The Beatles of the Bay." In the Summer of 2006 the A'z formed the label "Wing Team", by which all their productions, recording, and legal matters are formed. The Wing Team Studios and Label Headquarters are located in the Penthouse of the Broadway Building in heart of downtown Oakland, California.

The A'z signed with TVT Records.

The Video for their hit single Yadadamean, has received heavy rotation on MTV Jams and is listed as the second track on their latest mixtape album titled Drug Money Massacre hosted by DJ Gary. The mixtape was released on January 8, 2007.
