= I Don't Fuck with You =

2014 single by Big Sean featuring E-40

Single by Big Sean featuring E-40

from the album Dark Sky Paradise
- Released: September 19, 2014
- Length: 4:44
- Label: GOOD; Def Jam
- Songwriters: Sean Anderson; Kanye West; Dijon McFarlane; Mikely Adam; Willie Hansbro; Dacoury Natche; Dwane Weir II; Earl Stevens; D. J. Rogers
- Producers: DJ Mustard; Kanye West; DJ Dahi (add.); Mike Free (add.); Key Wane (add.)

Big Sean singles chronology
"All Me" (2013)	"I Don't Fuck with You" (2014)	"Paradise" (2014)

E-40 singles chronology
"Red Cup" (2014)	"I Don't Fuck with You" (2014)	"Fuck Boy" (2014)

Music video
- "I Don't Fuck with You" on YouTube

"I Don't Fuck with You", clean version titled "I Don't F**k with You", and also known by the initialism "IDFWU", is a song by American rapper Big Sean featuring California rapper E-40, released on September 19, 2014, as the lead single from the former's third studio album Dark Sky Paradise (2015).

"I Don't Fuck with You" was produced by DJ Mustard and Kanye West, and samples the 1976 D. J. Rogers song "Say You Love Me One More Time". Closing adlibs are performed over a slowed down version of the 1978 Earth, Wind & Fire song "September". All performers and producers receive songwriting credits alongside additional producers DJ Dahi, Mike Free, and Key Wane, with additional songwriting from longtime Big Sean affiliate, Michigan rapper Willie "SayItAintTone" Hansbro.

== Background and release ==
On March 19, 2014, Canada-based recording artist Justin Bieber uploaded to Instagram a snippet of an unreleased song which has the same beat. The record was supposed to be Bieber's, but there was no communication with the management, so producer DJ Mustard decided to give the record to Big Sean. On September 12, 2014, Big Sean announced he had signed with Roc Nation for a management deal, but stated he was still with GOOD Music. "I Don't Fuck with You" was released on the same day with three more new songs: "Paradise", "4th Quarter", and "Jit / Juke". Producers included Mike Will Made It, DJ Dahi, Nate Fox, Da Internz, L&F, and Key Wane.

The clean edit of the song produced for radio airplay does not contain either the word "fuck" or other words in the lyrics prohibited by the FCC.

=== Lyrics ===
Sean had been in a relationship with the late actress Naya Rivera and the couple announced their engagement in October 2013, but Sean ended the relationship in April 2014. Rivera then began dating actor Ryan Dorsey, whom she married on July 19, 2014, the original date set for her wedding to Big Sean. Although it was widely speculated that Sean wrote the song about the end of his relationship with Rivera, he denied that the song is about her. In a September 2020 interview, following Rivera's death, he stated he wished he never made the song: "I don't feel comfortable talking about it because I want to respect her. She's made such an impact on people, and she's done so many great things in her life and her career that it was hurtful to even have that [song] be associated with her. It wasn't a diss to her. I truly made the song and played it for her. She knew about it, and she liked it. We had a breakup that was very public, and we were young and we forgave each other and moved on from that".

== Commercial performance ==
"I Don't Fuck with You" peaked at number 11 on the US Billboard Hot 100, becoming Big Sean's third highest-charting single on the chart and E-40's second-highest. It also marked Big Sean's seventh and E-40's fifth top 20 single. As of February 2015, the song has sold 1,268,000 copies in the US.

== Music video ==
The official music video, directed by Lawrence Lamont, was released on November 6, 2014. It portrays Big Sean as a quarterback during a high school football game, and E-40 as a commentator. The song's producers, Kanye West and DJ Mustard, appear in the video, Kanye West appeared as the head coach of the football team, along with Naya Rivera, Fort Minor, The A'z and viral stars Simone Shepherd and Khalil Underwood.

== Usage in other media ==
The song is featured in three films: American Honey, Fist Fight, and Transformers: The Last Knight.

== Charts ==
=== Weekly charts ===
Chart (2014–2015)	Peak position
Australia (ARIA)	47
Belgium (Ultratip Bubbling Under Flanders)	49
Canada Hot 100 (Billboard)	35
France (SNEP)	138
Germany (GfK)	95
New Zealand (Recorded Music NZ)	25
Sweden Heatseeker (Sverigetopplistan)	10
UK Singles (Official Charts)	67
US Billboard Hot 100	11
US Hot R&B/Hip-Hop Songs (Billboard)	1
US Hot Rap Songs (Billboard)	1
US Pop Airplay (Billboard)	27
US Rhythmic Airplay (Billboard)	1

=== Year-end charts ===
Chart (2014)	Position
US Hot R&B/Hip-Hop Songs (Billboard)	52
Chart (2015)	Position
Australia Urban (ARIA)	22
US Billboard Hot 100	47
US Hot R&B/Hip-Hop Songs (Billboard)	18
US Rhythmic (Billboard)	27

== Certifications ==
Region	Certification	Certified units/sales
Australia (ARIA)	3× Platinum	210,000^{‡}
Brazil (Pro-Música Brasil)	Platinum	60,000^{‡}
Canada (Music Canada)	3× Platinum	240,000^{‡}
Denmark (IFPI Danmark)	Gold	45,000^{‡}
Germany (BVMI)	Gold	200,000^{‡}
New Zealand (RMNZ)	3× Platinum	90,000^{‡}
United Kingdom (BPI)	Platinum	600,000^{‡}
United States (RIAA)	Diamond	10,000,000^{‡}
^{‡} Sales+streaming figures based on certification alone.
