= Big Sean =

American rapper (born 1988)

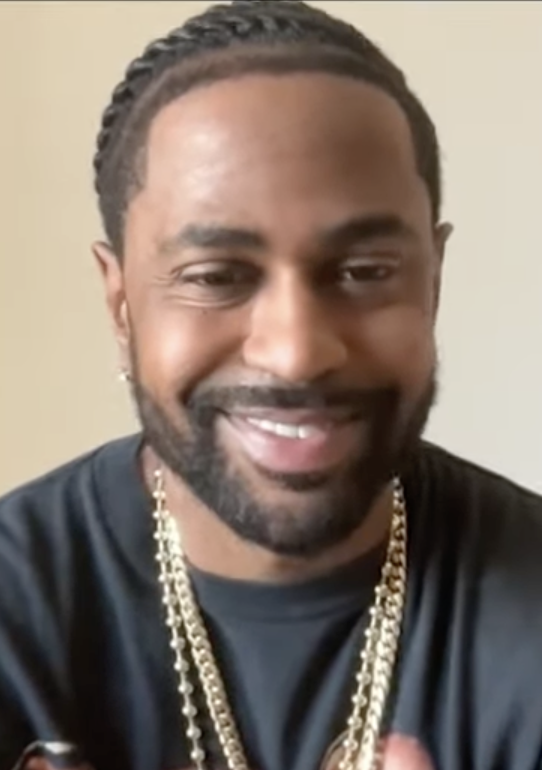
- Big Sean in 2025

Background information
- Born: Sean Michael Leonard Anderson; March 25, 1988 (age 38); Santa Monica, California, U.S.
- Origin: Detroit, Michigan, U.S.
- Genre: Midwestern hip-hop
- Occupations: Rapper; songwriter; actor
- Instrument: Vocals
- Works: Discography
- Years active: 2007–present
- Labels: Don Life; FF to Def; Roc Nation; Def Jam; GOOD
- Member of: Twenty88
- Partner: Jhené Aiko (2016–2025)
- Children: 1
- Website: uknowbigsean.com

Logo

Sean Michael Leonard Anderson (born March 25, 1988), known professionally as Big Sean, is an American rapper. He met Kanye West as a teenager, and signed with his record label GOOD Music, an imprint of Def Jam Recordings in 2007. He gained popularity following the release of his third mixtape, Finally Famous Vol. 3: Big (2010). His first two studio albums, Finally Famous (2011) and Hall of Fame (2013), both peaked at number three on the Billboard 200 and spawned the Billboard Hot 100-top 40 singles "My Last" (featuring Chris Brown), "Marvin & Chardonnay" (featuring Kanye West and Roscoe Dash), "Dance (Ass)" (remixed featuring Nicki Minaj), and "Beware" (featuring Lil Wayne and Jhené Aiko).

His third album, Dark Sky Paradise (2015), debuted atop the Billboard 200 and was led by the single "I Don't Fuck with You" (featuring E-40), which received diamond certification by the Recording Industry Association of America (RIAA); each of the album's singles—"Paradise", "Blessings" (featuring Drake and Kanye West), "One Man Can Change the World" (featuring John Legend and Kanye West), and "Play No Games" (featuring Ty Dolla Sign and Chris Brown)—received platinum or multi-platinum certification. His fourth and fifth albums, I Decided (2017) and Detroit 2 (2020), both debuted atop the Billboard 200; the former was supported by the single "Bounce Back", which peaked at number six on the Billboard Hot 100 and remains his highest-charting song. In the following year of the latter album's release, he parted ways with West and GOOD Music. His sixth album, Better Me Than You (2024), moderately entered the Billboard 200, and received mixed reviews.

== Early life ==
Sean Michael Leonard Anderson was born on March 25, 1988, in Santa Monica, California, to Myra and James Anderson. When he was three months old, he moved to Detroit, Michigan, where he was raised by his mother, a school teacher, and his grandmother. Anderson's said that his grandmother, Mildred Leonard, who served in World War II, was one of the first ever black female captains in the United States Army. He attended the Detroit Waldorf School and graduated from Cass Technical High School with a 3.7 GPA.

== Musical career ==
=== 2005–2006: Career beginnings ===
In his later years in high school, Sean showed his rhyming skills on a weekly basis as part of a rap battle contest held by Detroit hip-hop station WHTD. In 2005, Kanye West was doing a radio interview at 102.7 FM. Hearing about this, Sean came to the station to meet West and perform freestyle. Initially, West was reluctant to hear him; however, he gave him sixteen bars to rap for him. According to Sean, West enjoyed his freestyle: "As we get to the entrance of the radio station ... we stopped in the middle of the doorway. He starts looking at me and bobbing his head." After the freestyle, Sean left West his demo tape. Two years later, West signed Big Sean to GOOD Music. Sean has cited West, Eminem, The Notorious B.I.G., and J Dilla as his influences.

=== 2007–2010: Mixtapes and internet following ===
Sean in 2009

On September 30, 2007, Big Sean released his first official mixtape Finally Famous: The Mixtape. His hit single, "Get'cha Some", produced by WrighTrax, attained media attention and led to articles in The Source and the Detroit Metro Times. He also recorded a music video for "Get'cha Some", which was directed by Hype Williams. Sean released a second mixtape hosted by Mick Boogie on April 16, 2009, called UKNOWBIGSEAN. It featured the songs "Million Dollars", "Get'cha Some" and "Supa Dupa". This mixtape includes 30 tracks. Sean released a third mixtape hosted by Don Cannon on August 31, 2010, called Finally Famous Vol. 3: BIG, which features include major artists like Bun B, Chip tha Ripper, Curren$y, Tyga, Drake, Mike Posner, Chuck Inglish, Asher Roth, Dom Kennedy and Chiddy Bang. The mixtape includes 20 tracks.

A leak of his collaboration with Drake, "Made" made its way onto the Internet on April 30, 2010. During an interview with TheHipHopUpdate.com on May 1, Big Sean expressed his disappointment over the leak, calling it an unfinished version both musically and lyrically. Big Sean then stated on Facebook that his debut album, Finally Famous would be released on September 14, 2010. On August 31, Big Sean tweeted that the album was not coming out on that day, but that it would be coming out sometime in 2011.

=== 2011–2012: Finally Famous and Detroit ===
In an interview on Conspiracy Worldwide Radio, Sean discussed the role Kanye West and No I.D. have had in the development of his first studio album's sonic direction as well as the challenges of being inside the studio with West. The album's lead single, "My Last", features vocals from Chris Brown and was produced by No I.D. According to Amazon.com, Big Sean's Finally Famous was delayed by a week, with a tentative release date set for June 28. Big Sean revealed the cover art for his G.O.O.D. Music debut and explained that the one-week pushback was to be blamed on sample and feature clearance issues. The official tracklist was revealed on June 7.

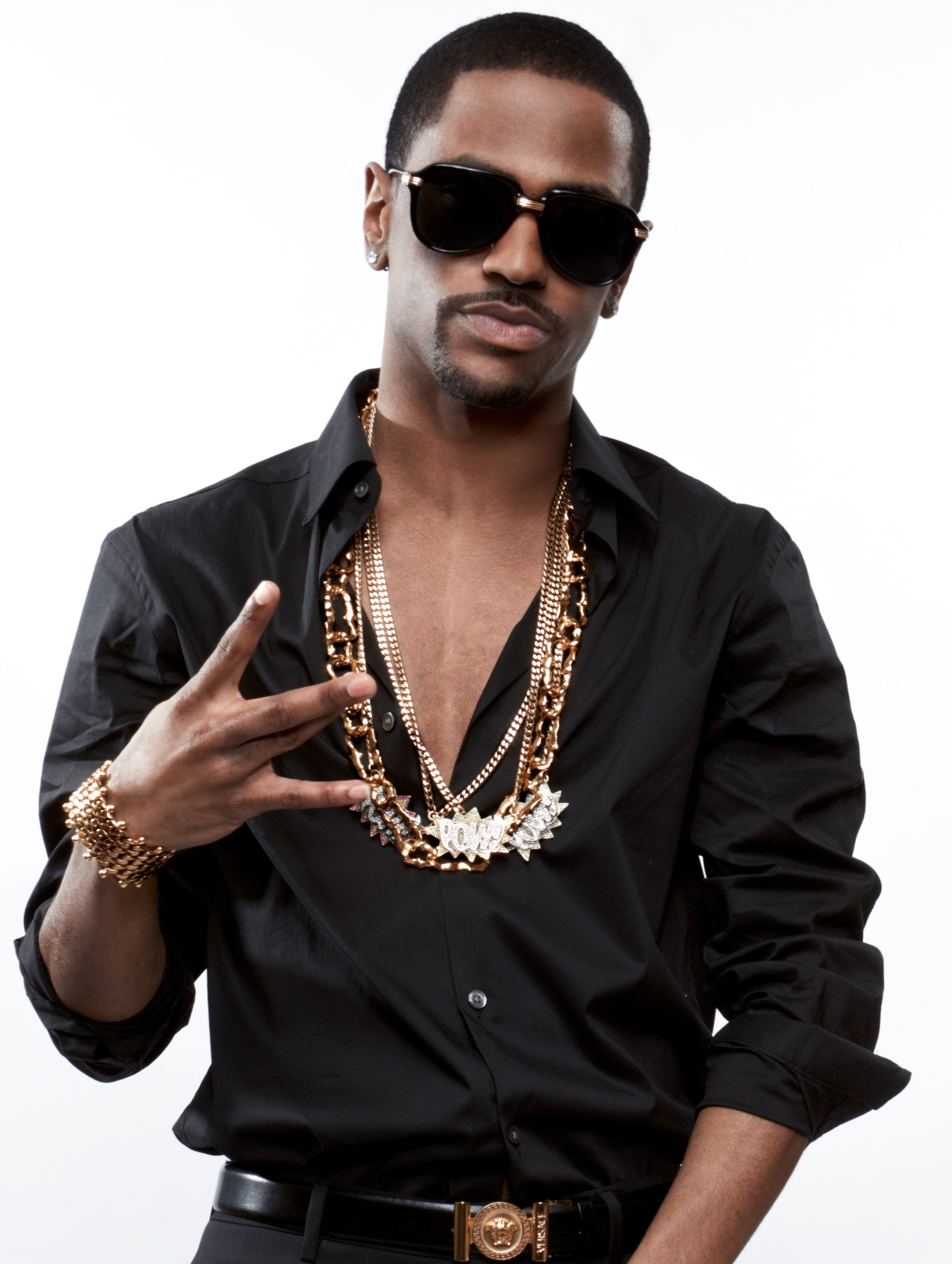
Sean in 2011

Finally Famous, Sean's debut studio album, was released June 28, 2011, and spawned three hit singles; "My Last", "Marvin & Chardonnay" and "Dance (Ass)". The album featured guest appearances from Lupe Fiasco, John Legend, Pharrell, Kanye West, Roscoe Dash, Wiz Khalifa, Chiddy Bang, Rick Ross, Nicki Minaj, Pusha T, and included production from No I.D., The Legendary Traxster, Pop Wansel, Xaphoon Jones and The Neptunes. When the songs "O.T.T.R." and "Flowers" were leaked in July 2011, speculation began of a new mixtape. Sean confirmed in an interview June 28, 2011, that a collaborative mixtape between him and "two other guys in hip-hop that are just killing it right now" will be released "in a couple of weeks". Wiz Khalifa and Curren$y, were the suspected featured rappers on the mixtape. However, Wiz Khalifa later confirmed that there would be no mixtape, claiming that the songs were created, "just for fun".

In July 2011, Big Sean contributed two rap verses to Kelly Rowland's single Lay It on Me, from her Here I Am album. Big Sean collaborated with Hit-Boy in writing and producing the song.

In September 2011, Big Sean confirmed in an interview with the Daily Tribune that he'll be working on his second album during the I Am Finally Famous Tour and plans to release the album sometime in 2012. On October 19, 2011, Kanye West announced on his Twitter plans for a Spring 2012 GOOD Music album release. On April 6, 2012, "Mercy", the lead single from the GOOD Music compilation album, Cruel Summer, was released. The song, produced by newly signed in-house producer Lifted, features Big Sean along with Kanye West, Pusha T and southern rapper 2 Chainz. Big Sean then announced his fourth mixtape would be titled "Detroit" and would serve as a lead-in to his second studio album. He then began promoting the mixtape, releasing short versions of the songs on his YouTube page. On September 5, 2012, Big Sean released the mixtape Detroit which features guest appearances from fellow rappers J. Cole, Juicy J, King Chip, French Montana, Royce da 5'9", Kendrick Lamar and Tyga.

=== 2013–2015: Hall of Fame and Dark Sky Paradise ===
Big Sean pushed back the release date of his second studio album Hall of Fame, and it was eventually released on August 27, 2013. The album has skits to give it a "classic feel", and includes features from multiple artists, including Lil Wayne, Miguel, and Nas. The album's production was primarily handled by No I.D., and Key Wane along with additional production from Hit-Boy, and Da Internz, Mike Dean, Travis Scott, Xaphoon Jones and Young Chop among others. Big Sean also stated in an interview that he was in the studio with fellow Detroit native Eminem. Sean went on to say they made a "Detroit classic" but he is unsure if it will be on Hall of Fame because of "timing issues". Hall of Fame had spawned five singles, "Guap", "Switch Up" featuring Common, "Beware" featuring Jhené Aiko and Lil Wayne, "Fire", and "Ashley" featuring Miguel.

A month prior to the release of Hall of Fame, Big Sean told Complex that he had already begun work on his third album due to the inspiration from his new relationship. On September 12, 2014, Big Sean announced that he had signed a management deal with Roc Nation. Later that same day he released four new songs titled, "I Don't Fuck with You", "Paradise", "4th Quarter" and "Jit/Juke". Producers for these songs include, Mike Will Made It, DJ Mustard, Kanye West, DJ Dahi, Nate Fox, Da Internz, L&F, and Key Wane. "I Don't Fuck with You" was released to iTunes on September 19, 2014. In an interview with Sway Calloway, Sean confirmed that Lil Wayne will be featured on the album.

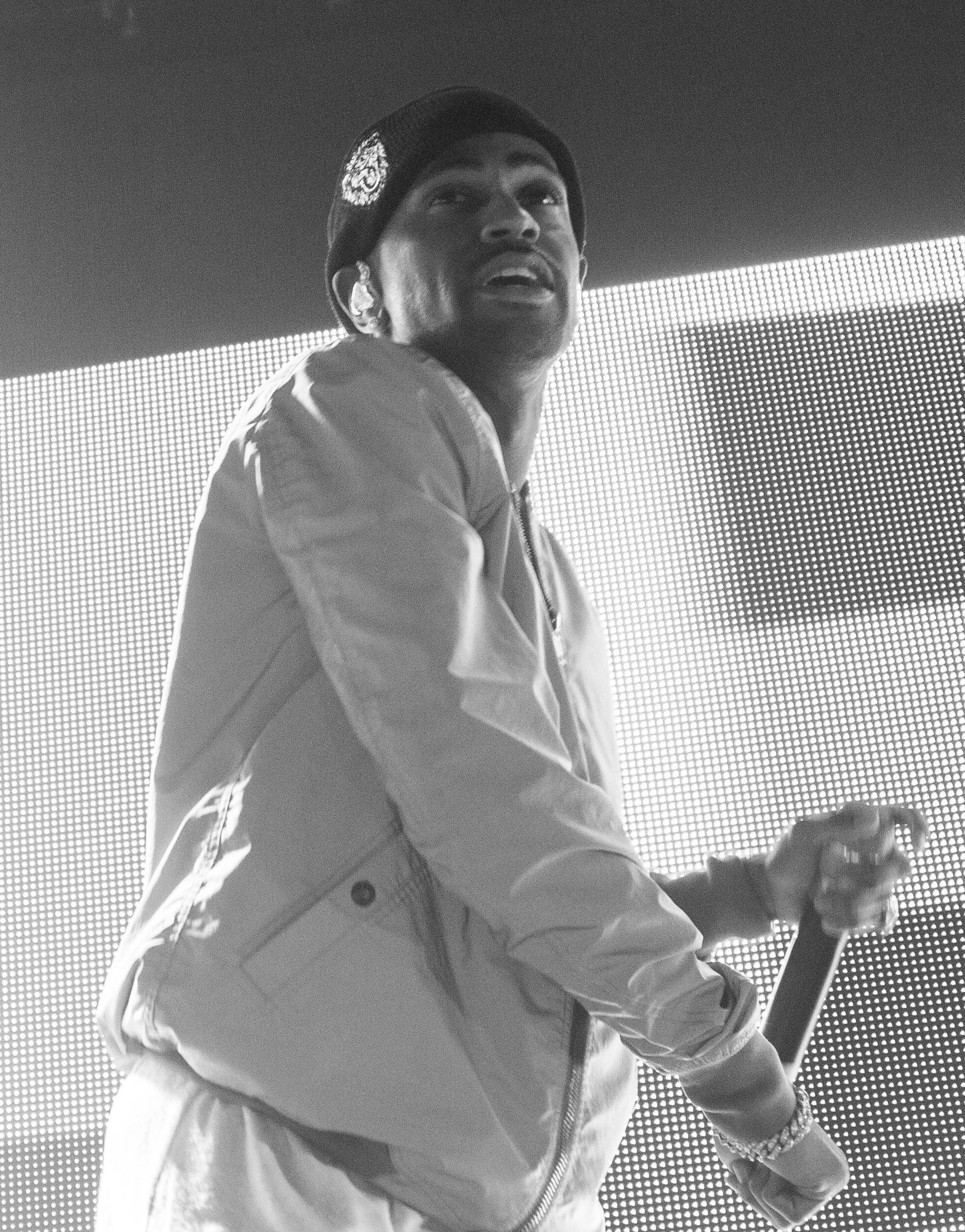
Sean performing in April 2015

On January 25, 2015, various artists who worked on Big Sean's upcoming third studio album such as Kanye West, Ty Dolla Sign, DJ Mustard, Drake, Travis Scott and Ariana Grande posted the album cover to Twitter or Instagram. The next day, Big Sean posted a trailer to his new album which revealed the album's release date as February 24, 2015. The album, Dark Sky Paradise debuted atop the Billboard 200 making it his first No. 1 album. He would lead with Video singles for songs entitled "IDFWU", "Blessings", "I Know", "One Man Can Change The World", and "Play No Games." As of February 1, 2016, Dark Sky Paradise was certified platinum. On December 31, 2015, Big Sean released a track recapping 2015, "What A Year (Ft. Pharrell Williams & Detail)".

=== 2016–2018: Twenty88, I Decided, and Double or Nothing ===
On March 25, 2016, Big Sean released a track to celebrate his 28th birthday, "Get My Shit Together". Two days later he announced a self-titled album with Jhené Aiko, as Twenty88, scheduled to be released on April 1, 2016, exclusively on Tidal. The album was released on April 5, 2016, on Apple Music and Spotify. A week after the exclusive release of Twenty88 on Tidal, Big Sean and Aiko released a 15-minute short film called Out of Love, which is composed of several recordings from the album. Around the same month, upon the wake of the Flint water crisis, Big Sean tweeted to the city's official Twitter account, asking if he could do anything to help, and later on donated $10,000.

On October 31, 2016, Big Sean released "Bounce Back" as the lead single from his fourth studio album, I Decided, which was released February 3, 2017. "Moves" was released as an instant-great on December 16, 2016. Sean consulted the advice of Jay Z and Rick Rubin while working on the album. Big Sean achieved his second number one album on the Billboard 200 chart, as I Decided debuted at the top. It earned 151,000 equivalent album units in the week of February 9, according to Nielsen Music. 65,000 of the number were in pure album sales. As of April 18, 2017, I Decided was certified gold.

Two months after the release of I Decided, Big Sean was offered the official Key to the City of Detroit for his contribution to his own Sean Anderson foundation.

On November 3, 2017, Sean and Metro Boomin released the single "Pull Up N Wreck", featuring 21 Savage. A month later, it was announced that Sean and Metro were to release a collaborative album titled Double or Nothing. The album was released on December 8, 2017, which included features from Travis Scott, 2 Chainz, 21 Savage, Kash Doll, Young Thug, and Swae Lee, and included the single "Pull Up N Wreck".

In 2017, Big Sean voiced the character of Terrence for an episode of HBO's animated series Animals.

=== 2019–present: Detroit 2, Better Me Than You and collaboration with The Alchemist ===
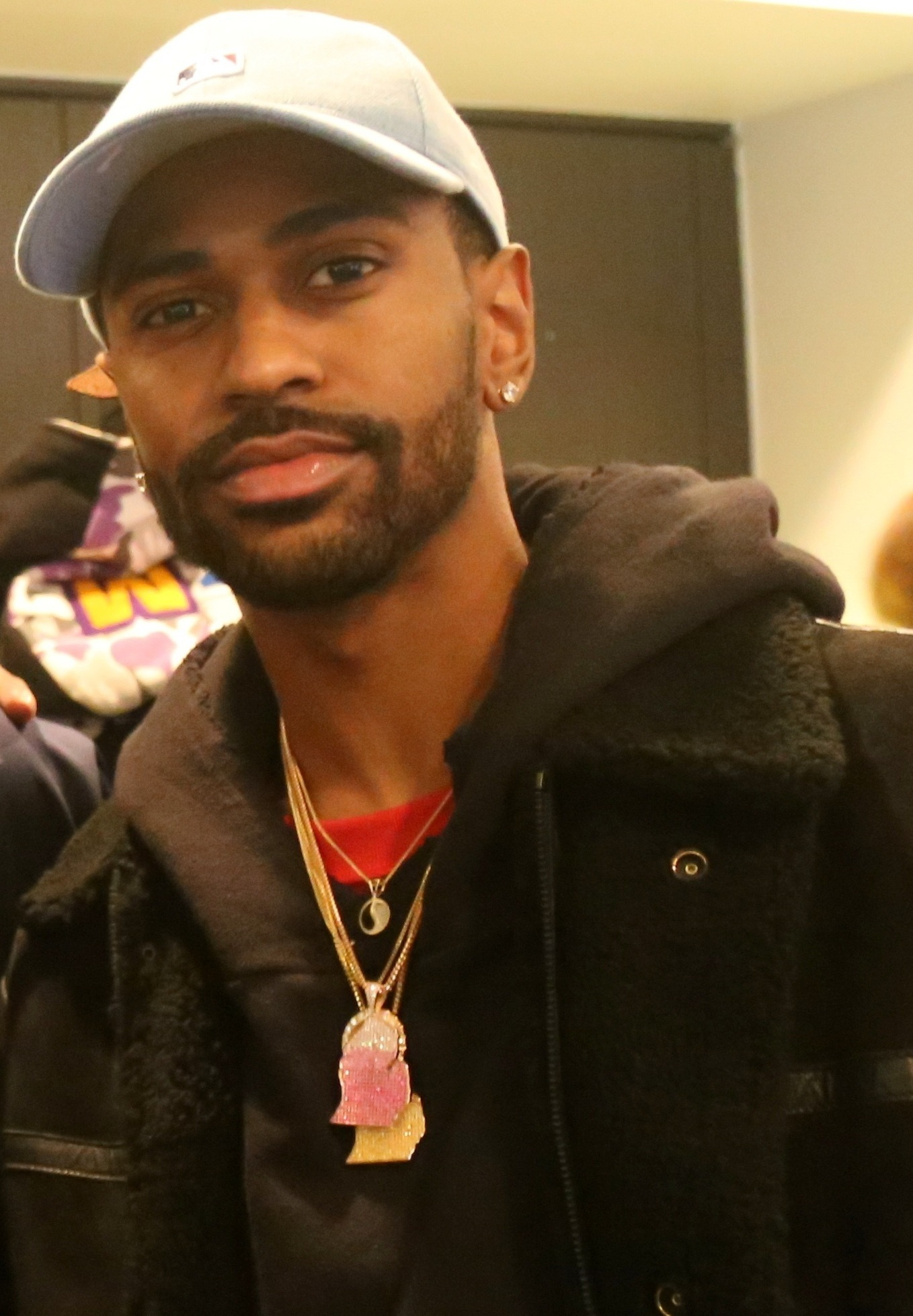
Sean in 2016

On July 24, 2019, Big Sean released his first solo single since 2017, "Overtime", produced by Hit-Boy, Key Wane, and the Tucker Brothers. In an interview with Beats 1 Radio, Sean said he was "returning to his roots" with the single ahead of his forthcoming album. On July 26, he released the song "Single Again", which includes background vocals from Jhené Aiko and Ty Dolla Sign. On August 26, he released the single "Bezerk" featuring ASAP Ferg, performing it at the 2019 MTV Video Music Awards.

On March 25 (Big Sean's 32nd birthday), he announced that his new record would be titled Detroit 2. On August 25, he released the album's lead single, "Deep Reverence", featuring late rapper Nipsey Hussle.

Later on in the year, Big Sean starred in the animated movie Trouble (also known as Dog Gone Trouble), alongside Pamela Adlon and Lucy Hale. The movie was directed by Kevin Johnson.

Detroit 2 was released on September 4, 2020, and features collaborations with Eminem, Jhené Aiko, and Lil Wayne. The album debuted at number one on the Billboard 200, marking his third number-one album.

On September 17, 2020, Big Sean revealed in a Reddit AMA that another Twenty88 album is "in the works". A track attributed to the project appeared on Detroit 2. He has also announced that he plans on launching his own record label. On October 29, 2021, Big Sean announced on Twitter that after 14 years, he has stepped away from Kanye West's G.O.O.D. Music label, saying "That's a forever brotherhood, but business wise, I had to start getting a bigger cut! I worked my way out that deal." West also claimed during a November 2021 Drink Champs podcast that signing Sean was the 'worst decision' of his entire career.

In 2020, Big Sean starred in the Showtime series Twenties in the recurring role of Trsitan, an anti-social media character who learns the value of online connection.

In October 2021, Big Sean released a collaborative extended play (EP) with record producer Hit-Boy titled What You Expect, which peaked at number 76 on the Billboard 200.

In February 2022, Big Sean released a duet single with American singer Queen Naija titled "Hate Our Love", which entered the Billboard Hot 100 at number 88. It was intended to lead Naija's second studio album, which remains unreleased, leaving the song a non-album single. In that same month, Big Sean announced an upcoming Twenty88 album, and revealed that the album would include a collaboration with his then-girlfriend, Jhené Aiko. In September of that year, Sean re-released his mixtape Detroit to streaming platforms, in honor of its tenth anniversary.

In July 2024, Big Sean released the collaborative single "Tobey" with fellow Detroit rappers Eminem and BabyTron; it peaked at number 27 on the Billboard Hot 100 and served as the second single for Eminem's twelfth album, The Death of Slim Shady (Coup de Grâce). Two weeks later, he performed a freestyle on the radio show On the Radar, wherein he indirectly affronted his former label boss Kanye West. As a result, the near-entirety of an unreleased or upcoming Big Sean album was leaked by a user on X. Seemingly undeterred, he wrote on the platform himself later that month:

"The pressure of life (being a new Dad, being [an] artist that’s growing, being a human in development, etc) and embracing it all led me to a lot of clarity on what I needed to focus on to find a piece of happiness [...] The past few years making this album have been a journey to say the least, but l’m just glad we finally here."

before announcing his sixth album, Better Me Than You to be released on August 9. Its lead single, "Yes" was released the following day of the post on July 19. Upon release, the album yielded moderate critical and commercial reception, debuting at number 25 on the Billboard 200.

On September 6, 2024, Sean revealed that he was working with record producer The Alchemist on a collaborative album.

== Personal life ==
Big Sean dated his high school sweetheart, Ashley Marie, whom he met when he was sixteen and started dating at nineteen until their break-up in early 2013. He subsequently began dating actress Naya Rivera, whom he first met on Twitter; their relationship became public in April 2013. Sean and Rivera were engaged from October 2013 to April 2014. He dated singer Ariana Grande from October 2014 to April 2015.

Big Sean was in a relationship with singer Jhené Aiko from 2016 to 2025. In his 2020 song "Deep Reverence", he revealed that Aiko had previously experienced a miscarriage. Their son was born on November 8, 2022.

On November 28, 2017, Big Sean purchased an 11,000 square foot home, with 7 bedrooms and 8 bathrooms home in Beverly Hills. The house was previously owned by Guns N' Roses guitarist Slash. Originally listed at $11 million, Big Sean acquired it for $8.7 million.

Big Sean has struggled with depression, canceling a tour in 2018. He credits therapy, a healthy lifestyle, exercise and taking a break from touring to refocus on his music as instrumental in his recovery.

=== Sean Anderson Foundation ===
In May 2012, Big Sean founded a nonprofit organization called the "Sean Anderson Foundation," with the aim of helping underserved children and families in Detroit. Alongside direct donations to local institutions, primarily educational institutions, the foundation has created fundraising programs and partnered with other organizations. In 2016, the foundation launched #HealFlintKids to raise money for the Community Foundation of Greater Flint amid the Flint water crisis – the program raised $100,000.

In 2015, the foundation launched Mogul Prep, which partnered high school students with music industry professionals. During the same year, the foundation donated a recording studio for students at Big Sean's alma mater, Cass Technical High School.

Beginning in 2018, the foundation has hosted an annual weekend festival, called D.O.N. Weekend, with free events and performances for Detroit residents and usually by Detroit artists. In December 2018, Big Sean in partnership with Ally Financial, Thurgood Marshall College Fund & the Sean Anderson Foundation, created an annual scholarship competition for HBCU students called "Moguls in the Making."

In 2019, the foundation partnered with Boys & Girls Club of Southeastern Michigan, donating a second $100,000 recording studio to the club during that year's D.O.N. Weekend.

Since 2012, the foundation has participated in the annual All Star Giveback on Thanksgiving, where it distributes turkeys, trimming and canned goods to Detroit residents.

In May 2021, Big Sean, via his Sean Anderson Foundation, released a video series on wellness and mental health. The series was released during Mental Health Awareness Month and featured conversation between Big Sean and his mother, educator Myra Anderson, about the intersection between wellness and mental health, including topics like meditation, sleep and emotional freedom techniques.

In December 2025, the foundation announced that they would again be partnering with the Boys & Girls Clubs and Usher to invest $1 million into the new Michigan Central Boys & Girls Club of Southeastern Michigan. Launched in February 2026, the initiative created the "Detroit Entertainment Innovation Incubator", providing youth (ages 14–24) with creative, music, and technology training.

=== Other ventures ===
In October 2008, Big Sean was featured in The Source and headlined the "Style" section of the magazine. He posed in the Winter 2008 Billionaire Boys Club lookbook, and is a consistent representative of Ti$A apparel. He has an endorsement deal with Adidas, through which he has released his own "Detroit Player" line of sneakers, and is a follower of the Rosewood clothing style.

In 2013, Big Sean launched his own clothing company, Aura Gold.

In 2018, Big Sean launched a shoe collection with PUMA, called Puma x Big Sean. The collection included a relaunch of the classic PUMA Suede, released on the shoe's 50th anniversary. In December 2020, Big Sean joined the NBA's Detroit Pistons as creative director of innovation. In that role, he leads the design of team apparel, with practice jerseys bearing his "Don Life" logo, and other non-game, community-driven initiatives.

In December 2020, Big Sean joined McDonald's "Black & Positively Golden" mentorship program. The program offers scholarships for HBCU students.

=== Legal issues ===
On August 4, 2011, Big Sean was arrested for third-degree sexual assault at a concert in Lewiston, New York. On October 26, he pleaded guilty to second-degree unlawful imprisonment, and was fined $750; the charges of third-degree sexual abuse were dropped as part of the plea bargain. Big Sean's attorney, Scott Leemon, stated that Sean "regrets any misunderstandings that occurred that day and reiterates he did not engage in any type of sexual misconduct."

== Discography ==
Studio albums

- Finally Famous (2011)
- Hall of Fame (2013)
- Dark Sky Paradise (2015)
- I Decided (2017)
- Detroit 2 (2020)
- Better Me Than You (2024)

Collaborative albums

- Twenty88 (with Jhené Aiko) (2016)
- Double or Nothing (with Metro Boomin) (2017)
- SeanChemist (with The Alchemist) (TBA)

== Filmography ==
Year	Title	Role	Notes
2017	Animals.	Terrence	Voice
2019	Trouble	Trouble	Voice
2020	Justin Bieber: Seasons	Himself	Episode: "The Finale"
2020–2021	Twenties	Tristan	Recurring character
2023	House Party	Himself	

== Tours ==
Headlining

- I Am Finally Famous Tour (2011)
- Detroit Tour (2013)
- Hall of Fame Tour (2014)
- I Decided Tour (2017)

Supporting act

- J. Cole – Forest Hills Drive Tour (2015)
- Rihanna – Anti World Tour (2016)
- Russ – Into the W!LD Tour (2025)

== See also ==
- List of awards and nominations received by Big Sean
