= Blessings (Big Sean song) =

Single by Big Sean featuring Drake and Kanye West

from the album Dark Sky Paradise
- Released: January 31, 2015
- Recorded: 2014
- Genre: Hip hop; trap
- Length: 4:12 (album version); 5:01 (extended version)
- Label: GOOD; Def Jam
- Songwriter(s): Sean Anderson; Anderson Hernandez; Aubrey Graham; Kanye West; Allen Ritter
- Producer(s): Vinylz; Ritter

Big Sean singles chronology
"Open Wide" (2015)	"Blessings" (2015)	"B Boy" (2015)

Drake singles chronology
"Truffle Butter" (2015)	"Blessings" (2015)	"Preach" (2015)

Kanye West singles chronology
"FourFiveSeconds" (2015)	"Blessings" (2015)	"All Day" (2015)

Music video
- "Blessings" on YouTube

"Blessings" is a song by American rapper Big Sean from his third studio album Dark Sky Paradise (2015). The song was serviced to urban contemporary radio by GOOD Music, an imprint of Def Jam Recordings on January 31, 2015, as the album's third official single. It features Canadian rapper Drake and GOOD Music label boss Kanye West, with production from Vinylz and Allen Ritter.

The music video for the song was released on YouTube on March 3, 2015. The single and music video version feature Drake and West, while the album version omits West. The song received two nominations at the 2015 Soul Train Music Awards for Best Collaboration and Hip-Hop Song of the Year.

== Background ==
The video of the song was released in greyscale. The original release only contained a feature from Drake, this being the version which appears on Dark Sky Paradise. An extended version featuring an additional verse from Kanye West was released as a single on February 3, 2015. Big Sean makes a reference to the Cartoon Network series Ed, Edd N Eddy in the song, when he raps “I’ve lost homies who been with me since Ed, Edd N Eddy”.

== Charts ==
Chart (2015–16)	Peak position
Belgium (Ultratip Bubbling Under Flanders)	96
Belgium Urban (Ultratop Flanders)	33
Canada (Canadian Hot 100)	59
France (SNEP)	184
UK Singles (Official Charts Company)	139
UK Hip Hop/R&B (OCC)	26
US Billboard Hot 100	28
US Hot R&B/Hip-Hop Songs (Billboard)	9
US Rhythmic (Billboard)	11

=== Year-end charts ===
Chart (2015)	Position
US Billboard Hot 100	88
US Hot R&B/Hip-Hop Songs (Billboard)	24

== Certifications ==
Region	Certification	Certified units/sales
Brazil (Pro-Música Brasil)	Gold	30,000^{‡}
Canada (Music Canada)	Platinum	80,000^{‡}
New Zealand (RMNZ)	Gold	15,000^{‡}
United Kingdom (BPI)	Silver	200,000^{‡}
United States (RIAA)	4× Platinum	4,000,000^{‡}
^{‡} Sales+streaming figures based on certification alone.
