= One Man Can Change the World =

Single by Big Sean featuring Kanye West and John Legend

from the album Dark Sky Paradise
- Released: June 19, 2015
- Recorded: 2014
- Genre: Pop-rap; neo soul
- Length: 4:15
- Label: GOOD; Def Jam
- Songwriters: Sean Anderson; Kanye West; John Stephens; Amaire Johnson; William Roberts II; Dijon McFarlane
- Producers: DJ Mustard; Johnson

Big Sean singles chronology
"How Many Times" (2015)	"One Man Can Change the World" (2015)	"Back Up" (2015)

Kanye West singles chronology
"U Mad" (2015)	"One Man Can Change the World" (2015)	"Famous" (2016)

John Legend singles chronology
"Lay Me Down" (2015)	"'One Man Can Change the World" (2015)	"Like I'm Gonna Lose You" (2015)

Music video
- "One Man Can Change the World" on YouTube

"One Man Can Change the World" is a song by American rapper Big Sean from his third studio album Dark Sky Paradise (2015). The song features fellow GOOD Music artists Kanye West and John Legend with production handled by Amaire Johnson and DJ Mustard. The song features uncredited background vocals from British singer Natasha Bedingfield. It was sent to United States rhythmic contemporary radio on June 19, 2015, as the album's fourth single.

== Music video ==
A music video written and directed by Andy Hines was released for the song on June 19, 2015. West and Legend do not appear in the video. The video was shot entirely in monochrome and was filmed in Detroit in honor of Sean's late grandmother, Mildred V. Leonard, who was one of the first black female captains of the U.S. Army. The video was shot in one day, using a modified monochrome RED Dragon camera. The video won MTV Video Music Award for Best Video with a Message at the 2015 MTV Video Music Awards. Various publications picked up the story about Hines not being invited officially by MTV due to their policy of supplying only the Best Director category with tickets.

== Awards ==
- Won for Best Video with a Social Message at the 2015 MTV Video Music Awards.
- Nominated for Best Rap/Sung Collaboration at the 58th Grammy Awards.
- Nominated for Best Collaboration at the 2016 BET Awards.
- Nominated for Outstanding Duo, Group or Collaboration at the 47th NAACP Image Awards.

== Charts ==
Chart (2015)	Peak position
Sweden Heatseeker (Sverigetopplistan)	11
US Billboard Hot 100	82
US Hot R&B/Hip-Hop Songs (Billboard)	27
US Rhythmic Airplay (Billboard)	11

== Certifications ==
Region	Certification	Certified units/sales
United States (RIAA)	Platinum	1,000,000^{‡}
^{‡} Sales+streaming figures based on certification alone.
