= Key Wane =

American songwriter

- Born: Dwane Marshall Weir II; July 12, 1990 (age 35); Detroit, Michigan, U.S.
- Genres: Hip hop; contemporary R&B
- Occupations: Record producer; songwriter; pianist
- Years active: 2007–present
- Labels: Finally Famous, For the Win

Dwane Marshall Weir II (born July 12, 1990), known professionally as Key Wane, is an American record producer and songwriter, best known for his work with American rapper Big Sean. Wane has also produced for other music industry artists, including Jazmine Sullivan, Beyoncé, Drake, Jhene Aiko, Wale, Lil Wayne, Young Jeezy, Juicy J, Ariana Grande, Logic, Ty Dolla Sign and Meek Mill, among others. His credits include Drake's "All Me", Beyoncé's "Partition", Jazmine Sullivan's "Let It Burn" and "Insecure", Meek Mill's "Amen", Big Sean's "Guap", "Beware" and "I Don't Fuck with You". Wane has also produced a bulk of Sean's albums, including Hall of Fame, Dark Sky Paradise, and Twenty 88.

== Early life ==
At the age 11, Wane began playing the piano in the church every first Sunday, initially teaching himself melodies before his mom heard him and got involved in his learning. He told XXL, “She ordered me this Casio keyboard out of a JCPenney catalog. It got mailed to the house, and I just started making beats on it. Then I started taking piano lessons, and the stuff I learned from my piano lessons, I would combine that with beats, and it really was just something that I loved to do, man. I really didn’t go out a lot cause I was always coming up with stuff." In December 2012, Key Wane graduated from Tennessee State University with a degree in Musical Arts and Sciences.

== Musical career ==
In 2002, Wane started making beats in his mother's basement. Wane met rapper Big Sean in the 8th grade through his older brother who told Wane to play beats for Sean. Big Sean was friends with Wane's older brother and cousin at their high school, Cass Technical High School in Detroit. Around the same time Wane started taking record production seriously, and begun sending him beats periodically. During mid-2010 before his junior year of college, Wane first became known after producing "Memories" by Big Sean, from his third mixtape Finally Famous Vol. 3: BIG. In 2011, Wane produced and co-wrote Tyga's "Drink the Night Away" featuring The Game and Mario, "Don't Wake Me Up" and "Hypnotized", all of which featured on his mixtape Black Thoughts Vol. 2. In November 2011, Warner/Chappell and Big Sean signed Wane to a co-publishing deal.

In early 2010, Wane produced "Amen" for Meek Mill after running into him while in New York. Meek Mill picked it up and released it as the lead single from his debut album Dreams and Nightmares. Many Christian hip hop artists and religious leaders commented negatively on the song. However the song peaked at number 57 on the Billboard Hot 100. After his significant contributions over the years, XXL named Wane one of hip-hops most must-watch producers. Wane was also included in XXL's Freshman Producer Class of 2013.

In December 2012, Wane confirmed working with Drake, Jhene Aiko, Big Sean and Beyoncé on their upcoming albums. On August 1, 2013 Drake released a song titled "All Me" produced and co-written by Wane, featuring 2 Chainz and Big Sean, from his upcoming third studio album Nothing Was the Same. He had originally produced the instrumental for himself, but after the record had sat for a couple months, Wane sent the instrumental to Drake, who immediately picked up the beat. Along with No ID, Wane produced the majority of Big Sean's second studio album Hall of Fame (2013), including the highest-charting singles of the album, "Guap" and "Beware" featuring Jhene Aiko and Lil Wayne. He contributed production to six songs in total. Key Wane co-produced Big Sean's "IDFWU" as well. In December 2014, Wane was nominated for his first Grammy for his production contribution on the Grammy nominated "Beyonce" for Album of the Year. In December 2015, Wane was nominated the following year at the Grammy's for his production on Jazmine Sullivan's "Let It Burn" for Best R&B Song of the Year.

== Production style ==
Key Wane's production has been described as "soulful instrumental music". His production is based around a melodic piano driven sound and a kickdrum.

== Awards and nominations ==
=== Grammy nominations ===
Year	Nominee/Work	Award	Result
2015	"BEYONCÉ"	Album Of The Year	Nominated
2016	"Let It Burn"^{(Jazmine Sullivan)}^{(Prod. Key Wane)}	Best R&B Song Of The Year	Nominated

=== BET Hip Hop Awards ===
Year	Nominee/Work	Award	Result
2015	"IDFWU"^{(Big Sean featuring E-40)}^{(Prod. DJ Mustard, Key Wane, Kanye West & DJ Dahi)}	Best Club Banger	Won
2015	"IDFWU"^{(Big Sean featuring E-40)}^{(Prod. DJ Mustard, Key Wane, Kanye West & DJ Dahi)}	Best Track Of The Year	Nominated

=== Certifications ===
Title	Year	Certifications	Album
"Amen"^{(Meek Mill featuring Drake)}^{(Prod. Key Wane)}	2012	RIAA: Gold	Dreams and Nightmares
"Guap"^{(Big Sean)}^{(Prod. Key Wane Co-Prod. Young Chop)}	2012	RIAA: Platinum^{[4]}	Hall of Fame
"Beware" (Big Sean featuring Lil Wayne & Jhene Aiko)^{(Prod. Key Wane Co-Prod. Mike Dean)}	2013	RIAA: Gold^{[4]}	Hall of Fame
"All Me" (Drake featuring Big Sean & 2 Chainz)^{(Prod. Key Wane)}	2013	RIAA: Platinum	Nothing Was the Same
"Partition" (Beyoncé)^{(Prod. Beyoncé Knowles, Boots, Justin Timberlake, Timbaland, Jerome "J-Roc" Harmon, Key Wane & Mike Dean)}	2014	RIAA: Platinum	Beyoncé
"IDFWU"^{(Big Sean featuring E-40)}^{(Prod. DJ Mustard, Key Wane, Kanye West & DJ Dahi)}	2014	RIAA: 4× Platinum^{[4]}; ARIA: Gold^{[37]}; BPI: Silver^{[35]}	Dark Sky Paradise
"I Know"^{(Big Sean featuring Jhené Aiko)}^{(Prod. DJ Mustard & Key Wane)}	2015	RIAA: Gold	Dark Sky Paradise
"Play No Games"^{(Big Sean featuring Chris Brown & Ty Dolla Sign)}^{(Prod. Key Wane & Jay John Henry)}	2016	RIAA: Gold	Dark Sky Paradise
"Jump Out The Window"^{(Big Sean)}^{(Prod. Key Wane & Camper)}	2017	RIAA: Gold	I Decided
"Insecure"^{(Jazmine Sullivan & Bryson Tiller}^{)}^{(Prod. Key Wane)}	2017		Insecure

== Production discography ==
=== Singles produced ===
Year	Title	Chart positions				Album
Year	Title	US	US R&B/HH	US Rap	UK R&B	Album
2012	"Amen"^{(Meek Mill featuring Drake)}^{(Prod. Key Wane)}	57	5	4	—	Dreams and Nightmares
2012	"Guap"^{(Big Sean)}^{(Prod. Key Wane Co-Prod. Young Chop)}	71	21	17	—	Hall of Fame
2013	"All Me" (Drake featuring Big Sean & 2 Chainz)^{(Prod. Key Wane)}	20	6	4	33	Nothing Was the Same
2013	"Beware" (Big Sean featuring Lil Wayne & Jhene Aiko)^{(Prod. Key Wane Co-Prod. Mike Dean)}	38	10	7	_	Hall of Fame
2014	"Partition" (Beyoncé)^{(Prod. Beyoncé Knowles, Boots, Justin Timberlake, Timbaland, Jerome "J-Roc" Harmon, Key Wane & Mike Dean)}	23	9	—	15	Beyoncé
2014	"IDFWU"^{(Big Sean featuring E-40)}^{(Prod. DJ Mustard, Key Wane, Kanye West & DJ Dahi)}	11	1	—	67	Dark Sky Paradise
2015	"Let It Burn"^{(Jazmine Sullivan)}^{(Prod. Key Wane)}	—	22	—	—	Reality Show
2015	"Play No Games"^{(Big Sean featuring Chris Brown & Ty Dolla Sign)}^{(Prod. Key Wane & Jay John Henry)}	84	28	—	—	Dark Sky Paradise
2016	"On The Way" (Twenty88) (Prod. Key Wane)	—	—	—	—	Twenty88
2016	"Déjà Vu" (Twenty88) (Prod. Key Wane & Cam O'bi)	—	21	—	—	Twenty88
2017	"Jump Out The Window"^{(Big Sean)}^{(Prod. Key Wane & Camper)}	76				I Decided
2017	"Insecure"^{(Jazmine Sullivan & Bryson Tiller)}^{(Prod. Key Wane)}		19			HBO: Insecure Soundtrack

=== Key Wane's production ===
Year	Artist	Song	Project
2009	Big Sean	"4 My People"	XXL's 10 Freshman For '10 Mixtape
2010	Big Sean	My Closet	Finally Famous Vol. 3: BIG
2010	Big Sean	"Almost Wrote You a Love Song" (co. produced by No ID)	Finally Famous Vol. 3: BIG
2010	Big Sean	Memories	Finally Famous Vol. 3: BIG
2011	Tyga	Don't Wake Me Up	Black Thoughts Vol. 2
2011	Tyga	Hypnotized	Black Thoughts Vol. 2
2011	Tyga	Drink The Night Away	Black Thoughts Vol. 2
2011	Mickey Factz	"The Finer Things"	N/A
2011	Big Sean	Intro	Finally Famous
2011	Chevy Woods	Down	The Cookout
2012	Tyga	"Potty Mouth" (featuring Busta Rhymes; addition production by Jess Jackson)	Careless World: Rise of the Last King
2012	Rockie Fresh	"So Long"	Driving 88
2012	King Chip	"Pocket Full"	Tell Ya Friends
2012	Meek Mill	"Amen" (featuring Drake; co-produced by Jahlil Beats)	Dreams and Nightmares
2012	Chevy Woods	"Ace N Mitch"	Gang Land
2012	Roscoe Dash	"MoWet" (featuring French Montana)	2.0
2012	Big Sean	"Higher"	Detroit
2012	Big Sean	"24 Karats of Gold" (featuring J. Cole)	Detroit
2012	Big Sean	"Woke Up" (co-produced by BP & Young Chop)	Detroit
2012	Big Sean	"I'm Gonna Be" (featuring Jhené Aiko)	Detroit
2012	Big Sean	"RWT" (co-produced by Southside)	Detroit
2012	Big Sean	"Guap" (co-produced by Young Chop; additional production by DJ Camper & Rob Kinelski)	Detroit
2012	Alley Boy	"I'm That"	War Cry
2012	Lil Wayne	"Awkward" (co-produced by Jahlil Beats)	The Appreciation Vol. 5: Holiday Edition
2012	Wale	"Money Changes"	Folarin
2012	Young Jeezy	"Knob Broke" (co-produced by Jahlil Beats)	It's Tha World
2013	Logic	"Life Is Good"	Young Sinatra: Welcome to Forever
2013	Big Sean	"Higher"	Hall of Fame
2013	Big Sean	"10 2 10" (add. production)	Hall of Fame
2013	Big Sean	"Beware" (featuring Jhené Aiko & Lil Wayne) (co-produced with Mike Dean)	Hall of Fame
2013	Big Sean	"It's Time" (featuring Young Jeezy & Payroll)	Hall of Fame
2013	Big Sean	"World Ablaze" (co. produced with No ID)	Hall of Fame
2013	Big Sean	"Guap" (co-produced by Young Chop; additional production by DJ Camper & Rob Kinelski)	Hall of Fame
2013	Drake	"All Me" (featuring 2 Chainz & Big Sean) (additional production by Noah "40" Shebib)	Nothing Was the Same
2013	Meek Mill	"Dope Dealer" (featuring Nicki Minaj & Rick Ross)	Dreamchasers 3
2013	Beyoncé Knowles	"Yoncé" / "Partition" (co-produced by Timbaland, Jerome "J-Roc" Harmon, Justin Timberlake and Beyoncé Knowles)	Beyoncé
2013	Beyoncé Knowles	"Mine" _{(co-produced &written by Noah "40" Shebib, Drake, Beyoncé, Majid Jordan, Sidney "Omen" Brown and Key Wane)}	Beyoncé
2013	Diggy Simmons	"Mama Said" (featuring B.o.B and Key Wane)	TBA
2014	Big Sean	"1st Quarter Freestyle" (co-produced by Travi$ Scott)	non-album singles
2014	Big Sean	"4th Quarter"	non-album singles
2014	Ariana Grande	"Best Mistake" (featuring Big Sean)	My Everything
2014	Jhené Aiko	"My Afternoon Dream"	Souled Out
2014	Jhené Aiko	"Eternal Sunshine"	Souled Out
2014	Jhené Aiko	"Mirrors"	Souled Out
2015	Jazmine Sullivan	"Dumb" (featuring Meek Mill) (co-produced with Salaam Remi)	Reality Show
2015	Jazmine Sullivan	"Mascara"	Reality Show
2015	Jazmine Sullivan	"Silver Lining"	Reality Show
2015	Jazmine Sullivan	"Let It Burn"	Reality Show
2015	Jazmine Sullivan	"Veins"	Reality Show
2015	Big Sean	"I Don't Fuck with You" (featuring E-40) (add. production)	Dark Sky Paradise
2015	Big Sean	"Play No Games" (featuring Chris Brown and Ty Dolla $ign) (co-produced with Jay Henry)	Dark Sky Paradise
2015	Big Sean	"I Know" (featuring Jhené Aiko) (co-produced with DJ Mustard)	Dark Sky Paradise
2015	Big Sean	"Deep" (featuring Lil Wayne) (co-produced with DJ Mustard)	Dark Sky Paradise
2015	Big Sean	"Platinum & Wood"	Dark Sky Paradise
2015	Jordin Sparks	"Work From Home" (featuring B.o.B)	Right Here, Right Now
2015	Jordin Sparks	"100 Years"	Right Here, Right Now
2015	Ne-Yo	"Run"	Non-Fiction
2016	Twenty88	"Déjà Vu"	Twenty88
2016	Twenty88	"On The Way"	Twenty88
2016	Twenty88	"London Bridge"	Twenty88
2016	French Montana	"Holy Moly"	Wave Gods
2016	Dreezy	"Bad Bitch"	No Hard Feelings
2016	DJ Khaled	"Tourist" (featuring Travis Scott & Lil Wayne)	Major Key
2017	Jhené Aiko	"Sing To Me" (featuring Namiko Love)	Trip
2017	Gucci Mane	"Changed" (featuring Big Sean)	Mr. Davis
2017	Jazmine Sullivan	"Insecure" (featuring Bryson Tiller)	HBO: Insecure Soundtrack
2017	Big Sean	"Jump Out The Window"	I Decided
2018	Royce Da 5'9	"Woke"	Book Of Ryan
2018	Royce Da 5'9	"1st Of The Month" (featuring T-Pain & Chavis Chandler)	Book Of Ryan
2020	Jazmine Sullivan	"Bodies (Intro)"	Heaux Tales
2020	Jazmine Sullivan	"Put It Down"	Heaux Tales
