= Big Sean discography =

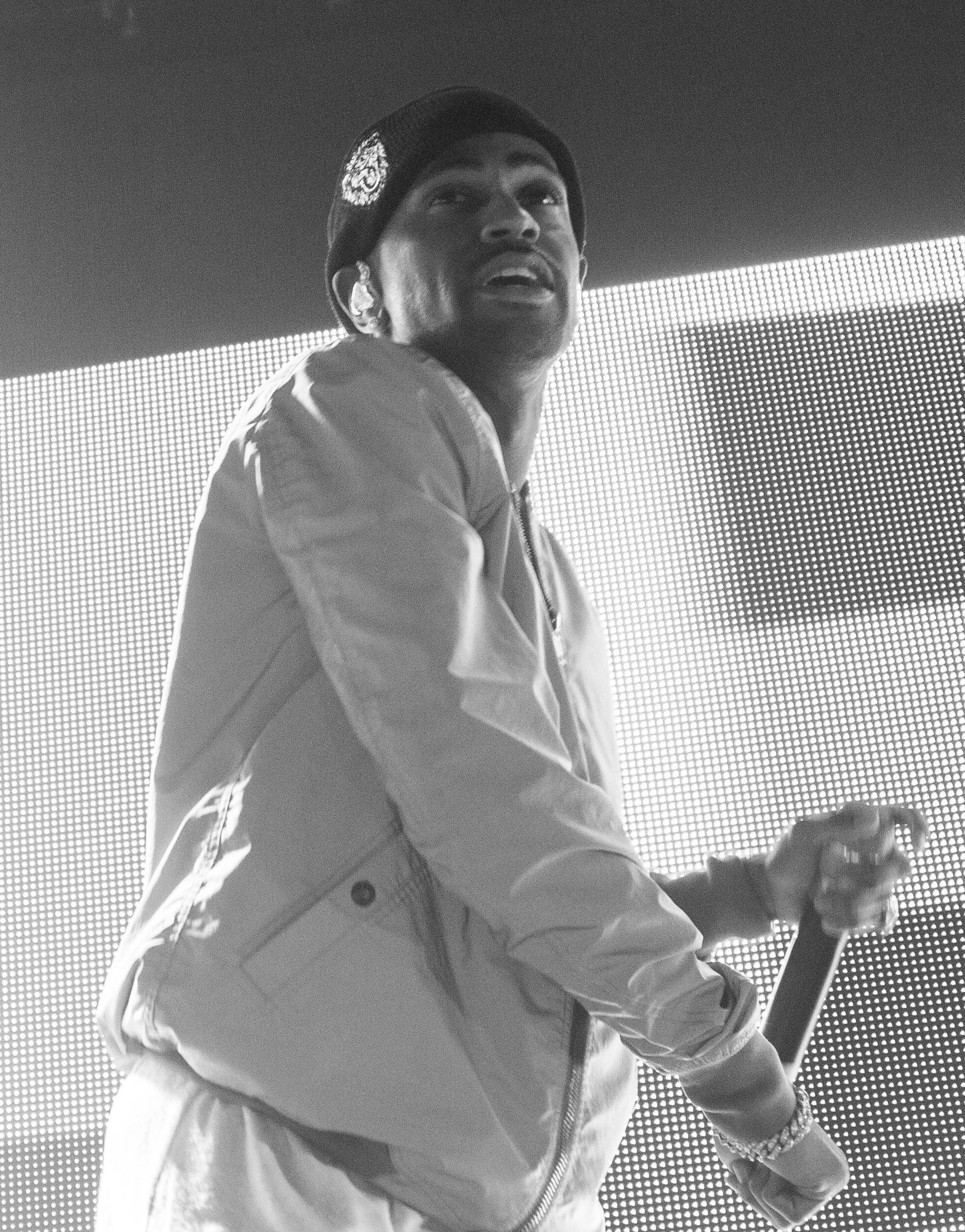
- Sean performing in 2015
- Studio albums: 6
- Singles: 68
- Music videos: 47
- Mixtapes: 4
- Collaborative albums: 3
- Collaborative EPs: 1
- Promotional singles: 8

American rapper Big Sean has released six studio albums, four mixtapes, thirty-one singles (including thirty-seven as featured artist), eight promotional singles, and thirty-nine music videos. In 2008, Big Sean was discovered by American rapper and record producer Kanye West, who signed Sean to his record label GOOD Music—distributed through Def Jam Recordings. Since 2008, after signing a record deal to West's label G.O.O.D. Music, Sean's career continued through his mixtapes such as Finally Famous Vol. 2: UKnowBigSean (2009) and Finally Famous Vol. 3: BIG (2010). While he was releasing these mixtapes, he collaborated on various tracks and/or singles from West, Royce da 5'9" and Chris Brown.

On June 28, 2011, Sean released his debut studio album, Finally Famous, debuting at number 3 on the US Billboard 200. The album's lead single, "My Last" peaked at number 30 on the US Billboard Hot 100 and topped the US Hot Rap Songs chart. The single was certified gold by the Recording Industry Association of America (RIAA). The album's second single, "Marvin & Chardonnay" peaked at number 32 on the Billboard Hot 100 and topped the US Hot R&B/Hip-Hop Songs chart. Additionally, it was certified platinum by the Recording Industry Association of America (RIAA). The album's third single, "Dance (A$$)" was released in a remixed form featuring rapper Nicki Minaj. The single peaked at number 10 on the Billboard Hot 100, and became certified triple platinum by the Recording Industry Association of America (RIAA).

In 2012, he collaborated with artists on several multiple Hot 100 top 40 singles, including "Mercy" by West, "My Homies Still" by Lil Wayne and "As Long as You Love Me" by Justin Bieber.

In 2014, Sean released "I Don't Fuck with You", which peaked at number 11 on the Billboard Hot 100 and topped the Hot R&B/Hip-Hop Songs chart; as well as being certified triple platinum by the Recording Industry Association of America (RIAA). On February 24, 2015, Big Sean released his best selling album, titled Dark Sky Paradise. The album received positive reviews and became his first studio album to top the Billboard 200. Since its release, six tracks from the album have charted on the Billboard Hot 100. The album's second single, 'Blessings', was certified triple platinum. Throughout the next year, another four tracks from Dark Sky Paradise—"Paradise", "One Man Can Change the World", "I Know" and "Play No Games"—were all certified platinum or higher by the Recording Industry Association of America (RIAA).

== Albums ==
=== Studio albums ===
List of studio albums, with selected chart positions and certifications
Title	Album details	Peak chart positions										Certifications
Title	Album details	US	US R&B/HH	US Rap	AUS	BEL (FL)	CAN	DEN	NZ	SWI	UK	Certifications
Finally Famous	Released: June 28, 2011; Re-released: June 25, 2021; Label: GOOD, Def Jam; Format: CD, LP, digital download	3	2	1	—	—	20	—	—	—	—	RIAA: Platinum
Hall of Fame	Released: August 27, 2013; Label: GOOD, Def Jam; Format: CD, LP, digital download	3	1	1	—	149	10	—	—	—	56	RIAA: Gold
Dark Sky Paradise	Released: February 24, 2015; Label: GOOD, Def Jam; Format: CD, LP, digital download, streaming	1	1	1	28	88	5	29	23	41	23	RIAA: 2× Platinum; BPI: Silver; IFPI DEN: Platinum; RMNZ: Platinum
I Decided	Released: February 3, 2017; Label: GOOD, Def Jam; Format: CD, LP, digital download, streaming	1	1	1	14	67	1	15	12	39	12	RIAA: Platinum; RMNZ: Gold
Detroit 2	Released: September 4, 2020; Label: GOOD, Def Jam; Format: CD, LP, digital download, streaming	1	1	1	22	59	3	38	16	31	24	RIAA: Gold
Better Me Than You	Released: August 30, 2024; Label: FF to Def, Def Jam; Format: CD, LP, digital download, streaming	25	4	3	—	—	—	—	—	—	—	
"—" denotes a recording that did not chart or was not released in that territory.

=== Collaborative albums ===
List of collaborative albums, with selected chart positions
Title	Album details	Peak chart positions			
Title	Album details	US	US R&B /HH	US Rap	CAN
Twenty88 (with Jhené Aiko)	Released: April 1, 2016; Label: GOOD, Def Jam, ARTium; Format: CD, digital download	5	1	1	28
Double or Nothing (with Metro Boomin)	Released: December 8, 2017; Label: GOOD, Def Jam, Boominati Worldwide, Republic; Format: CD, LP, cassette, digital download	6	2	2	15

== Extended plays ==
List of extended plays, with selected chart positions
Title	EP details	Peak chart positions	
Title	EP details	US	US R&B/HH
What You Expect (with Hit-Boy)	Released: October 29, 2021; Label: FF to Def, Def Jam; Format: Digital download, streaming	76	41

== Mixtapes ==
Title	Mixtape details
Finally Famous Vol. 1: The Mixtape	Released: November 24, 2007; Label: GOOD, Def Jam; Format: Digital download
Finally Famous Vol. 2: UKnowBigSean	Released: April 21, 2009; Label: GOOD, Def Jam; Format: Digital download
Finally Famous Vol. 3: Big	Released: August 31, 2010; Label: GOOD, Def Jam; Format: Digital download
Detroit	Released: September 5, 2012; Label: GOOD, Def Jam; Format: CD, LP, digital download

== Singles ==
=== As lead artist ===
List of singles as lead artist, with selected chart positions and certifications, showing year released and album name
Title	Year	Peak chart positions								Certifications	Album
Title	Year	US	US R&B/HH	US Rap	AUS	CAN	NZ	UK	UK R&B	Certifications	Album
"What U Doin?"	2010	—	—	—	—	—	—	—	—		Finally Famous Vol. 3: Big
"My Last" (featuring Chris Brown)	2011	30	4	1	—	—	—	—	—	RIAA: Platinum	Finally Famous
"Marvin & Chardonnay" (featuring Kanye West and Roscoe Dash)	2011	32	1	4	—	—	—	—	—	RIAA: Platinum	Finally Famous
"Dance (Ass)" (featuring Nicki Minaj)	2011	10	3	2	—	69	—	—	—	RIAA: 5× Platinum; RMNZ: Gold	Finally Famous
"Mercy" (with Kanye West, Pusha T and 2 Chainz)	2012	13	1	1	60	46	—	55	9	RIAA: 8× Platinum; BPI: Gold; RMNZ: Platinum	Cruel Summer
"Clique" (with Kanye West and Jay-Z)	2012	12	2	2	39	17	—	22	4	RIAA: 4× Platinum; BPI: Gold; RMNZ: Platinum	Cruel Summer
"Guap"	2012	71	21	17	—	—	—	—	—	RIAA: Platinum	Hall of Fame
"Switch Up" (featuring Common)	2013	—	50	—	—	—	—	—	—		Hall of Fame
"Beware" (featuring Lil Wayne and Jhené Aiko)	2013	38	10	6	—	—	—	183	26	RIAA: 4× Platinum; BPI: Silver; RMNZ: Platinum	Hall of Fame
"Fire"	2013	— (Note: "Fire" did not enter the US Billboard Hot 100, but peaked at number 19 on the Bubbling Under Hot 100 chart.)	46	—	—	—	—	—	—		Hall of Fame
"Ashley" (featuring Miguel)	2013	—	—	—	—	—	—	—	—		Hall of Fame
"10 2 10" (Remix) (featuring Rick Ross and Travis Scott)	2014	—	—	—	—	—	—	—	—		Non-album single
"I Don't Fuck with You" (featuring E-40)	2014	11	1	1	47	35	25	67	8	RIAA: Diamond; ARIA: 3× Platinum; BPI: Platinum; MC: 3× Platinum; RMNZ: 3× Platinum	Dark Sky Paradise
"Paradise"	2014	99	34	23	—	—	—	—	—	RIAA: Platinum	Dark Sky Paradise
"Blessings" (featuring Drake and Kanye West)	2015	28	10	5	—	59	—	139	—	RIAA: 4× Platinum; BPI: Silver; MC: Platinum; RMNZ: Gold	Dark Sky Paradise
"One Man Can Change the World" (featuring Kanye West and John Legend)	2015	82	27	21	—	—	—	—	—	RIAA: Platinum	Dark Sky Paradise
"Play No Games" (featuring Chris Brown and Ty Dolla Sign)	2015	84	28	21	—	—	—	—	—	RIAA: Platinum; RMNZ: Gold	Dark Sky Paradise
"Champions" (with Kanye West, Gucci Mane, 2 Chainz, Travis Scott, Yo Gotti, Quavo and Desiigner)	2016	71	22	15	—	—	—	128	—	RIAA: Platinum; BPI: Silver	Non-album singles
"No More Interviews"	2016	—	—	—	—	—	—	—	—		Non-album singles
"Bounce Back"	2016	6	3	3	52	17	28	67	9	RIAA: 6× Platinum; ARIA: 2× Platinum; BPI: Gold; MC: 2× Platinum; RMNZ: 2× Platinum	I Decided
"Moves"	2017	38	15	9	—	46	—	—	21	RIAA: 2× Platinum; RMNZ: Gold	I Decided
"Jump Out the Window"	2017	76	29	—	—	93	—	—	—	RIAA: Platinum; RMNZ: Gold	I Decided
"Pull Up N Wreck" (with Metro Boomin featuring 21 Savage)	2017	80	33	—	—	82	—	—	—		Double or Nothing
"So Good" (with Metro Boomin featuring Kash Doll)	2018	— (Note: "So Good" did not enter the US Billboard Hot 100, but peaked at number 13 on the Bubbling Under Hot 100 chart.)	—	—	—	—	—	—	—	RIAA: Platinum	Double or Nothing
"Overtime"	2019	—	—	—	—	—	—	—	—		Detroit 2
"Single Again"	2019	64	25	22	—	—	— (Note: "Single Again" did not enter the NZ Top 40 Singles Chart, but peaked at number 25 on the NZ Hot Singles Chart.)	—	—	RIAA: Gold	Detroit 2
"Bezerk" (featuring ASAP Ferg and Hit-Boy)	2019	89	39	—	—	85	— (Note: "Bezerk" did not enter the NZ Top 40 Singles Chart, but peaked at number 26 on the NZ Hot Singles Chart.)	—	—	RIAA: Gold	Detroit 2
"Deep Reverence" (featuring Nipsey Hussle)	2020	82	31	—	—	—	—	—	—	RIAA: Gold	Detroit 2
"Wolves" (featuring Post Malone)	2020	65	24	21	—	56	—	—	—	RIAA: Platinum; RMNZ: Gold	Detroit 2
"What a Life" (with Hit-Boy)	2021	— (Note: "What a Life" did not enter the Billboard Hot 100, but peaked at number 21 on the Bubbling Under Hot 100 Singles chart.)	—	—	—	—	—	—	—		What You Expect
"Hate Our Love" (with Queen Naija)	2022	88	31	—	—	—	— (Note: "Hate Our Love" did not enter the NZ Top 40 Singles Chart, but peaked at number 25 on the NZ Hot Singles Chart.)	—	—	RIAA: Gold	Non-album single
"Precision"	2024	— (Note: "Precision" did not enter the US Billboard Hot 100, but peaked at number 19 on the Bubbling Under Hot 100 chart.)	—	—	—	—	— (Note: "Precision" did not enter the NZ Top 40 Singles Chart, but peaked at number 39 on the NZ Hot Singles Chart.)	—	—		Better Me Than You
"Shut Up" (with Jessie Reyez)	2024	—	—	—	—	—	—	—	—		Paid in Memories
"Tobey" (with Eminem and BabyTron)	2024	24	7	5	38	21	34	29	—	MC: Gold	The Death of Slim Shady (Coup de Grâce)
"Yes"	2024	—	—	—	—	—	—	—	—		Better Me Than You
"On Up"	2024	—	—	—	—	—	—	—	—		Better Me Than You
"Beautiful Scars" (with Will Smith & Obanga)	2025	—	—	—	—	—	—	—	—		Based on a True Story
"—" denotes a recording that did not chart or was not released in that territory.

=== As featured artist ===
List of singles as featured artist, with selected chart positions and certifications, showing year released and album name
Title	Year	Peak chart positions										Certifications	Album
Title	Year	US	US R&B/HH	US Rap	AUS	CAN	IRL	NLD	NZ	UK	UK R&B	Certifications	Album
"Fat Raps" (Chip tha Ripper featuring Currensy and Big Sean)	2010	—	—	—	—	—	—	—	—	—	—		The Cleveland Show
"My Closet" (Sayitainttone featuring Big Sean)	2011	—	—	—	—	—	—	—	—	—	—		Finally Famous Vol. 3: Big
"Lay It on Me" (Kelly Rowland featuring Big Sean)	2011	— (Note: "Lay It on Me" did not enter the Billboard Hot 100, but peaked at number nine on the Bubbling Under Hot 100 Singles chart.)	43	—	—	—	—	—	—	69	19		Here I Am
"Already There" (John West featuring Big Sean)	2012	—	—	—	—	—	—	—	—	—	—		Non-album singles
"Kiss It Bye Bye" (Aleesia featuring Big Sean)	2012	—	—	—	—	—	—	—	—	—	—		Non-album singles
"Till I Die" (Chris Brown featuring Big Sean and Wiz Khalifa)	2012	— (Note: "Till I Die" did not enter the Billboard Hot 100, but peaked at number one on the Bubbling Under Hot 100 Singles chart.)	12	15	—	—	—	—	—	—	—	RIAA: Gold	Fortune
"Naked" (Kevin McCall featuring Big Sean)	2012	—	77	—	—	—	—	—	—	—	—		Non-album single
"My Homies Still" (Lil Wayne featuring Big Sean)	2012	38	20	16	—	—	—	—	—	—	—	RIAA: Platinum	I Am Not a Human Being II
"As Long as You Love Me" (Justin Bieber featuring Big Sean)	2012	6	— (Note: "As Long as You Love Me" did not enter the US Hot R&B/Hip-Hop Songs chart, but peaked at number 16 on the Bubbling Under Hot R&B/Hip-Hop Singles chart.)	—	8	9	38	33	6	22	—	RIAA: 5× Platinum; ARIA: 5× Platinum; BPI: Platinum; RMNZ: 2× Platinum	Believe
"Good Girls (Don't Grow on Trees)" (Cris Cab featuring Big Sean)	2012	—	—	—	—	—	—	—	—	—	—		Non-album single
"Mary" (2AM Club featuring Big Sean and Dev)	2012	—	—	—	—	—	—	—	—	—	—		Moon Tower
"Burn" (Meek Mill featuring Big Sean)	2012	— (Note: "Burn" did not enter the Billboard Hot 100, but peaked at number one on the Bubbling Under Hot 100 Singles chart.)	86	—	—	—	—	—	—	—	—	RIAA: Gold	Dreamchasers 2
"Show Out" (Juicy J featuring Big Sean and Young Jeezy)	2013	75	23	17	—	—	—	—	—	—	—		Stay Trippy
"All That (Lady)" (Game featuring Lil Wayne, Big Sean, Fabolous and Jeremih)	2013	—	48	—	—	—	—	—	—	—	—		Jesus Piece
"Wild" (Jessie J featuring Big Sean and Dizzee Rascal)	2013	— (Note: "Wild" did not enter the Billboard Hot 100, but peaked at number four on the Bubbling Under Hot 100 Singles chart.)	—	—	6	—	23	63	27	5	—	BPI: Gold; ARIA: 2× Platinum; IFPI DEN: Gold; RMNZ: Gold	Alive
"Sorry" (Naya Rivera featuring Big Sean)	2013	—	—	—	—	—	81	—	—	73	—		Non-album single
"Right There" (Ariana Grande featuring Big Sean)	2013	84	—	—	51	—	—	—	—	113	15	RIAA: Platinum; ARIA: Gold	Yours Truly
"All Me" (Drake featuring 2 Chainz and Big Sean)	2013	20	6	4	—	72	—	—	—	112	33	RIAA: 2× Platinum; ARIA: Gold; BPI: Silver; RMNZ: Gold	Nothing Was the Same
"Top of the World" (Mike Posner featuring Big Sean)	2013	—	—	—	—	—	—	—	—	—	—		Pages
"Memphis" (Justin Bieber featuring Big Sean)	2014	—	—	—	—	—	—	—	—	—	—		Journals
"Diamonds" (Common featuring Big Sean)	2014	—	—	—	—	—	—	—	—	—	—		Nobody's Smiling
"Don't Play" (Travis Scott featuring the 1975 and Big Sean)	2014	—	—	—	—	—	—	—	—	—	—	RIAA: Gold; MC: Gold	Days Before Rodeo
"Detroit vs. Everybody" (with Eminem, Royce da 5'9", Danny Brown, Dej Loaf and Trick-Trick)	2014	— (Note: "Detroit Vs. Everybody" did not enter the Billboard Hot 100, but peaked at number eight on the Bubbling Under Hot 100 Singles chart.)	28	23	—	—	—	—	—	—	—		Shady XV
"Open Wide" (Calvin Harris featuring Big Sean)	2015	— (Note: "Open Wide" did not enter the Billboard Hot 100, but peaked at number 15 on the Bubbling Under Hot 100 Singles chart.)	—	—	77	—	63	—	—	23	—	ARIA: Gold; MC: Platinum; RIAA: Gold	Motion
"B Boy" (Meek Mill featuring Big Sean and A$AP Ferg)	2015	—	39	—	—	—	—	—	—	—	—		Non-album single
"How Many Times" (DJ Khaled featuring Chris Brown, Lil Wayne and Big Sean)	2015	68	17	13	—	—	—	—	—	—	—	RIAA: Gold	I Changed a Lot
"Fighting Shadows" (Jane Zhang featuring Big Sean)	2015	—	—	—	—	—	—	—	—	—	—		Terminator Genisys: Music from the Motion Picture
"Back Up" (DeJ Loaf featuring Big Sean)	2015	47	16	10	—	—	—	—	—	—	—	RIAA: Platinum	...And See That's the Thing
"Holy Key" (DJ Khaled featuring Big Sean, Kendrick Lamar and Betty Wright)	2016	84	29	22	99	—	—	—	—	—	—	RIAA: Gold	Major Key
"Castro" (Yo Gotti featuring Kanye West, Big Sean, 2 Chainz and Quavo)	2016	— (Note: "Castro" did not enter the Billboard Hot 100, but peaked at number 16 on the Bubbling Under Hot 100 Singles chart.)	— (Note: "Castro" did not enter the Hot R&B/Hip-Hop Songs chart, but peaked at number six on the Bubbling Under R&B/Hip-Hop Singles chart.)	—	—	—	—	—	—	—	—		White Friday (CM9)
"I Think of You" (Jeremih featuring Chris Brown and Big Sean)	2017	—	— (Note: "I Think of You" did not enter the Hot R&B/Hip-Hop Songs chart, but peaked at number five on the Bubbling Under R&B/Hip-Hop Singles chart.)	—	—	—	—	—	—	—	—		Non-album singles
"Skateboard P" (MadeinTYO featuring Big Sean)	2017	— (Note: "Skateboard P" did not enter the Billboard Hot 100, but peaked at number six on the Bubbling Under Hot 100 Singles chart.)	42	—	—	—	—	—	—	—	—	RIAA: Platinum	Non-album singles
"Feels" (Calvin Harris featuring Pharrell Williams, Katy Perry and Big Sean)	2017	20	10	—	3	32	17	62	3	1	—	RIAA: 3× Platinum; ARIA: 6× Platinum; BPI: 3× Platinum; MC: 6× Platinum; RMNZ: 4× Platinum	Funk Wav Bounces Vol. 1
"Miracles (Someone Special)" (Coldplay featuring Big Sean)	2017	—	—	—	—	—	98	30	—	54	—	FIMI: Gold	Kaleidoscope EP
"Alone" (Halsey featuring Big Sean and Stefflon Don)	2018	65	—	—	—	—	—	—	—	—	—	RIAA: Platinum; RMNZ: Platinum	Hopeless Fountain Kingdom
"Big Bank" (YG featuring 2 Chainz, Big Sean and Nicki Minaj)	2018	16	13	10	—	54	—	—	—	—	—	RIAA: 4× Platinum; MC: Gold; RMNZ: Platinum	Stay Dangerous
"None of Your Concern" (Jhene Aiko featuring Big Sean)	2019	55	—	—	—	—	—	—	—	—	—	RIAA: 2× Platinum	Chilombo
"Timeless" (Benny the Butcher featuring Lil Wayne and Big Sean)	2020	—	—	—	—	—	—	—	—	—	—		Burden of Proof
"4 Thangs" (Freddie Gibbs featuring Big Sean)	2020	—	—	—	—	—	—	—	—	—	—		Non-album single
"Way Out" (Jack Harlow featuring Big Sean)	2020	74	18	17	—	51	77	—	— (Note: "Way Out" did not enter the NZ Top 40 Singles Chart, but peaked at number eight on the NZ Hot Singles Chart.)	—	—	RIAA: Platinum; MC: 2× Platinum; RMNZ: Gold	Thats What They All Say
"Easy Lover" (Ellie Goulding featuring Big Sean)	2022	—	—	—	—	—	—	—	— (Note: "Easy Lover" did not enter the NZ Top 40 Singles Chart, but peaked at number 27 on the NZ Hot Singles Chart.)	—	—		Higher Than Heaven
"Ya Don't Stop" (DJ Premier featuring Big Sean, Lil Wayne and Rick Ross)	2024	—	—	—	—	—	—	—	—	—	—		Non-album single
"—" denotes a recording that did not chart or was not released in that territory.

=== Promotional singles ===
List of promotional singles, with selected chart positions, showing year released and album name
Title	Year	Peak chart positions								Certifications	Album
Title	Year	US	US R&B/HH	US Rap	AUS	CAN	NZ	UK	UK R&B	Certifications	Album
"Whatever U Want" (GOOD Music Remix) (Consequence featuring Kanye West, Common, Kid Cudi and Big Sean)	2010	—	—	—	—	—	—	—	—		Non-album single
"What Goes Around"	2011	—	—	—	—	—	—	—	—		Finally Famous
"So Much More"	2011	—	—	—	—	—	—	—	—		Finally Famous
"What Yo Name Iz?" (Remix) (Kirko Bangz featuring Wale, Big Sean and Bun B)	2011	—	—	—	—	—	—	—	—		Non-album single
"My Own Planet" (Royce da 5'9" featuring Big Sean)	2011	—	—	—	—	—	—	—	—		Street Hop
"Oh My" (Remix) (DJ Drama featuring Trey Songz, 2 Chainz and Big Sean)	2011	—	—	—	—	—	—	—	—		Third Power
"Control" (featuring Kendrick Lamar and Jay Electronica)	2013	— (Note: "Control" did not enter the Billboard Hot 100, but peaked at number 11 on the Bubbling Under Hot 100 Singles chart.)	43	—	—	—	—	—	—		Non-album single
"Who I Am" (Pusha T featuring 2 Chainz and Big Sean)	2013	—	—	—	—	—	—	—	—		My Name Is My Name
"Best Mistake" (Ariana Grande featuring Big Sean)	2014	49	—	—	45	39	29	154	—	RIAA: Gold; ARIA: Gold; BPI: Silver; RMNZ: Gold	My Everything
"Alright" (Logic featuring Big Sean)	2014	—	—	—	—	—	—	—	—	RIAA: Platinum	Under Pressure
"Win Some, Lose Some"	2015	—	—	—	—	—	—	—	—		Dark Sky Paradise
"One of Them" (G-Eazy featuring Big Sean)	2015	—	38	—	—	—	—	—	—	RIAA: Gold	When It's Dark Out
"Living Single" (featuring Chance the Rapper and Jeremih)	2016	—	—	—	—	—	—	—	—	RIAA: Platinum; RMNZ: Gold	Non-album single
"Halfway Off the Balcony"	2017	74	28	—	—	70	—	—	—	RIAA: Gold	I Decided
"Harder Than My Demons"	2020	— (Note: "Harder Than My Demons" did not enter the Billboard Hot 100, but peaked at number four on the Bubbling Under Hot 100 Singles chart.)	43	—	—	—	—	—	—		Detroit 2
"—" denotes a recording that did not chart or was not released in that territory.

== Other charted and certified songs ==
List of songs, with selected chart positions, showing year released and album name
Title	Year	Peak chart positions										Certifications	Album
Title	Year	US	US R&B /HH	US Rap	US Rock	AUS	CAN	NZ Hot	NZ Heat.	UK	UK R&B	Certifications	Album
"Cooler than Me" (Mike Posner featuring Big Sean)	2009	6	—	—	—	4	5	—	—	5	—	RMNZ: 4× Platinum; ARIA: 3× Platinum; MC: Platinum; BPI: 3× Platinum; RIAA: 6× Platinum	A Matter of Time
"Paper, Scissors, Rock" (Chris Brown featuring Timbaland and Big Sean)	2011	—	— (Note: "Paper, Scissors, Rock" did not enter the Hot R&B/Hip-Hop Songs chart, but peaked at number 23 on the Bubbling Under R&B/Hip-Hop Singles chart.)	—	—	—	—	—	—	—	—		F.A.M.E.
"I Do It"	2011	—	92	—	—	—	—	—	—	—	—	RIAA: Gold	Finally Famous
"High" (featuring Wiz Khalifa and Chiddy Bang)	2011	98	—	—	—	—	—	—	—	—	—	RIAA: Gold	Finally Famous
"Slight Work" (Wale featuring Big Sean)	2012	—	63	—	—	—	—	—	—	—	—		Ambition
"Mula" (featuring French Montana)	2012	—	— (Note: "Mula" did not enter the Hot R&B/Hip-Hop Songs chart, but peaked at number 22 on the Bubbling Under R&B/Hip-Hop Singles chart.)	—	—	—	—	—	—	—	—		Detroit
"The One" (with Kanye West, 2 Chainz and Marsha Ambrosius)	2012	— (Note: "The One" did not enter the Billboard Hot 100, but peaked at number 11 on the Bubbling Under Hot 100 Singles chart.)	— (Note: "The One" did not enter the Hot R&B/Hip-Hop Songs chart, but peaked at number nine on the Bubbling Under R&B/Hip-Hop Singles chart.)	—	—	—	—	—	—	—	—		Cruel Summer
"Don't Like.1" (with Kanye West, Chief Keef, Pusha T and Jadakiss)	2012	—	—	—	—	—	—	—	—	—	—	RIAA: Platinum	Cruel Summer
"The Mighty Fall" (Fall Out Boy featuring Big Sean)	2013	—	—	—	47	—	—	—	—	—	—	RIAA: Gold	Save Rock and Roll
"Mula" (Remix) (featuring 2 Chainz, Meek Mill and Earlly Mac)	2013	—	— (Note: "Mula (Remix)" did not enter the Hot R&B/Hip-Hop Songs chart but peaked at number four on the Bubbling Under Hot R&B/Hip Hop Singles chart.)	—	—	—	—	—	—	—	—		Hall of Fame
"Sanctified" (Rick Ross featuring Kanye West and Big Sean)	2014	78	23	11	—	—	99	—	—	133	25		Mastermind
"All Your Fault" (featuring Kanye West)	2015	80	28	18	—	—	—	—	—	—	—	RIAA: Gold	Dark Sky Paradise
"I Know" (featuring Jhené Aiko)	2015	— (Note: "I Know" did not enter the Billboard Hot 100, but peaked at number three on the Bubbling Under Hot 100 Singles chart.)	37	—	—	—	—	—	—	—	—	RIAA: 3× Platinum; BPI: Silver; RMNZ: Platinum	Dark Sky Paradise
"Deep" (featuring Lil Wayne)	2015	—	— (Note: "Deep" did not enter the Hot R&B/Hip-Hop Songs chart but peaked at number one on the Bubbling Under Hot R&B/Hip Hop Singles chart.)	—	—	—	—	—	—	—	—		Dark Sky Paradise
"Dark Sky (Skyscrapers)"	2015	—	— (Note: "Dark Sky (Skyscrapers)" did not enter the Hot R&B/Hip-Hop Songs chart but peaked at number two on the Bubbling Under Hot R&B/Hip Hop Singles chart.)	—	—	—	—	—	—	—	—		Dark Sky Paradise
"Research" (featuring Ariana Grande)	2015	—	— (Note: "Research" did not enter the Hot R&B/Hip-Hop Songs chart but peaked at number three on the Bubbling Under Hot R&B/Hip Hop Singles chart.)	—	—	—	—	—	—	—	—		Dark Sky Paradise
"No Pressure" (Justin Bieber featuring Big Sean)	2015	49	—	—	—	60	44	—	—	42	—	RIAA: Gold; ARIA: Gold; BPI: Silver; RMNZ: Gold	Purpose
"Intro"	2017	—	— (Note: "Intro" did not enter the US Hot R&B/Hip-Hop Songs chart, but peaked at number 10 on the Bubbling Under Hot R&B/Hip Hop Singles chart.)	—	—	—	—	—	—	—	—		I Decided
"Light" (featuring Jeremih)	2017	97	39	—	—	—	—	—	—	—	—		I Decided
"No Favors" (featuring Eminem)	2017	22	11	7	—	77	34	—	2	56	8	RIAA: Platinum	I Decided
"Same Time, Pt. 1" (featuring Twenty88)	2017	— (Note: "Same Time, Pt. 1" did not enter the Billboard Hot 100, but peaked at number 10 on the Bubbling Under Hot 100 Singles chart.)	— (Note: "Same Time, Pt. 1" did not enter the US Hot R&B/Hip-Hop Songs chart, but peaked at number three on the Bubbling Under Hot R&B/Hip Hop Singles chart.)	—	—	—	—	—	—	—	—		I Decided
"Owe Me"	2017	86	34	22	—	—	89	—	—	—	—		I Decided
"Voices in My Head / Stick to the Plan"	2017	— (Note: "Voices in My Head / Stick to the Plan" did not enter the Billboard Hot 100, but peaked at number one on the Bubbling Under Hot 100 Singles chart.)	44	—	—	—	—	—	—	—	—		I Decided
"Sunday Morning Jetpack" (featuring The-Dream)	2017	— (Note: "Sunday Morning Jetpack" did not enter the Billboard Hot 100, but peaked at number 11 on the Bubbling Under Hot 100 Singles chart.)	— (Note: "Sunday Morning Jetpack" did not enter the US Hot R&B/Hip-Hop Songs chart, but peaked at number four on the Bubbling Under Hot R&B/Hip Hop Singles chart.)	—	—	—	—	—	—	—	—		I Decided
"Inspire Me"	2017	— (Note: "Inspire Me" did not enter the Billboard Hot 100, but peaked at number 14 on the Bubbling Under Hot 100 Singles chart.)	— (Note: "Inspire Me" did not enter the US Hot R&B/Hip-Hop Songs chart, but peaked at number six on the Bubbling Under Hot R&B/Hip Hop Singles chart.)	—	—	—	—	—	—	—	—		I Decided
"Sacrifices" (featuring Migos)	2017	70	26	17	—	—	79	—	—	—	—	RIAA: Gold	I Decided
"Bigger Than Me" (featuring Flint Chozen Choir and Starrah)	2017	— (Note: "Bigger Than Me" did not enter the Billboard Hot 100, but peaked at number eight on the Bubbling Under Hot 100 Singles chart.)	— (Note: "Bigger Than Me" did not enter the US Hot R&B/Hip-Hop Songs chart, but peaked at number one on the Bubbling Under Hot R&B/Hip Hop Singles chart.)	—	—	—	—	—	—	—	—		I Decided
"Go Legend" (with Metro Boomin featuring Travis Scott)	2017	67	28	—	—	—	59	—	—	—	—		Double or Nothing
"Frat Rules" (with ASAP Mob, ASAP Rocky, Playboi Carti)	2017	—	—	—	—	—	—	—	—	—	—	RIAA: Gold	Cozy Tapes Vol. 2: Too Cozy
"White Sand" (Migos featuring Travis Scott, Ty Dolla Sign, and Big Sean)	2018	64	31	—	—	—	—	—	—	—	—	RIAA: Gold	Culture II
"Jealous" (DJ Khaled featuring Chris Brown, Lil Wayne and Big Sean)	2019	57	26	—	—	59	54	8	—	37	17	RIAA: Gold; ARIA: Gold; RMNZ: Gold	Father of Asahd
"Why Would I Stop?"	2020	97	36	—	—	—	—	—	—	—	—		Detroit 2
"Lucky Me"	2020	— (Note: "Lucky Me" did not enter the Billboard Hot 100, but peaked at number six on the Bubbling Under Hot 100 Singles chart.)	46	—	—	—	—	—	—	—			Detroit 2
"Body Language" (featuring Ty Dolla Sign and Jhené Aiko)	2020	95	35	—	—	—	—	—	—	—	—	RIAA: Gold	Detroit 2
"ZTFO"	2020	— (Note: "ZTFO" did not enter the Billboard Hot 100, but peaked at number nine on the Bubbling Under Hot 100 Singles chart.)	—	—	—	—	—	—	—	—			Detroit 2
"Lithuania" (featuring Travis Scott)	2020	69	26	23	—	—	52	—	—	—	—		Detroit 2
"Friday Night Cypher" (featuring Tee Grizzley, Kash Doll, Cash Kidd, Payroll, 42 Dugg, Boldy James, Drego, Sada Baby, Royce da 5'9" and Eminem)	2020	— (Note: "Friday Night Cypher" did not enter the Billboard Hot 100, but peaked at number 10 on the Bubbling Under Hot 100 Singles chart.)	—	—	—	—	—	—	—	—	—		Detroit 2
"Go Crazy" (Megan Thee Stallion featuring Big Sean and 2 Chainz)	2020	— (Note: "Go Crazy" did not enter the Billboard Hot 100, but peaked at number 12 on the Bubbling Under Hot 100 Singles chart.)	—	—	—	—	—	—	—	—	—		Good News
"This Is My Year" (DJ Khaled featuring A Boogie wit da Hoodie, Big Sean, Rick Ross and Puff Daddy)	2021	— (Note: "This Is My Year" did not enter the Billboard Hot 100, but peaked at number 20 on the Bubbling Under Hot 100 Singles chart.)	—	—	—	—	—	—	—	—	—		Khaled Khaled
"Loyal to a Fault" (with Hit-Boy featuring Bryson Tiller and Lil Durk)	2021	— (Note: "Loyal to a Fault" did not enter the Billboard Hot 100, but peaked at number three on the Bubbling Under Hot 100 Singles chart.)	46	—	—	—	—	—	—	—	—		What You Expect
"It Is What It Is" (with Gunna)	2024	—	38	—	—	—	—	—	—	—	—		Better Me Than You
"Sharks" (with Lil Wayne and Jelly Roll)	2025	54	12	—	—	—	—	38	—	—	—		Tha Carter VI
"—" denotes a recording that did not chart or was not released in that territory.

== Other guest appearances ==
List of non-single guest appearances, with other performing artists, showing year released and album name
Title	Year	Other artist(s)	Album
"Teriya-King"	2009	Teriyaki Boyz, Kanye West	Serious Japanese
"Paranoid" (Remix)	2009	Kanye West, Mr Hudson	none
"Who Knows?"	2009	Mike Posner	A Matter of Time
"Smoke & Drive"	2009	Mike Posner, Donnis, Jackie Chain	A Matter of Time
"Speed of Sound"	2009	Mike Posner	One Foot Out the Door
"Bring Me Down"	2009	Mike Posner, Freddie Gibbs	One Foot Out the Door
"Loser"	2009	DJ Yoda, Tommy Lee, Lil Wayne, Spark Dawg, Joell Ortiz, Sum 41, J-Son	none
"My Own Planet" (Remix)	2009	Royce da 5'9"	Street Hop
"Poed Up"	2009	Fly Union	Value Pack 1
"#1"	2009	Ro Spit, CurT@!n$, Bun B	The Oh S#!t Project
"Life vs. Livin'"	2009	XV	Everybody's Nobody
"Before She Said Hi"	2009	Mario	D.N.A.
"I'm on It"	2010	French Montana, Nipsey Hussle, Wiz Khalifa	Mac & Cheese 2
"Good Friday"	2010	Kanye West, Kid Cudi, Pusha T, Common, Charlie Wilson	GOOD Fridays releases
"Don't Look Down"	2010	Kanye West, Lupe Fiasco, Mos Def	GOOD Fridays releases
"Looking for Trouble"	2010	Kanye West, Pusha T, CyHi the Prynce, J. Cole	GOOD Fridays releases
"Christmas in Harlem"	2010	Kanye West, Cam'ron, Jim Jones, Vado, CyHi the Prynce, Musiq Soulchild, Teyana Taylor, Pusha T	GOOD Fridays releases
"See Me Now"	2010	Kanye West, Beyoncé, Charlie Wilson	My Beautiful Dark Twisted Fantasy
"All of the Lights" (Remix)	2011	Kanye West, Lil Wayne, Drake	none
"Big Nut Bust"	2011	Travis Barker	Let the Drummer Get Wicked
"Woopty Doo"	2011	CyHi the Prynce	Royal Flush II
"GangBang"	2011	Wiz Khalifa	Cabin Fever
"Oh My" (Remix)	2011	DJ Drama, Trey Songz, 2 Chainz	Third Power
"Paper, Scissors, Rock"	2011	Chris Brown, Timbaland	F.A.M.E.
"Ghetto"	2011	The-Dream	1977
"I Don't Care"	2011	New Boyz	Too Cool to Care
"Future"	2011	DJ Khaled, Ace Hood, Meek Mill, Wale, Vado	We the Best Forever
"Love Money"	2011	Soulja Boy	The Last Crown
"K.O."	2011	2 Chainz	T.R.U. REALigion
"Slight Work"	2011	Wale	Ambition
"Lucky Cunt"	2011	Tinie Tempah	Happy Birthday
"Sidity"	2011	Roscoe Dash	J.U.I.C.E.
"Fireworkz" (Remix)	2011	Tyrese, T.I., Busta Rhymes	none
"Go Girl"	2012	Yo Gotti, Big K.R.I.T., Wale, Wiz Khalifa	Live from the Kitchen
"I'm Gone"	2012	Tyga	Careless World: Rise of the Last King
"Take U Home"	2012	Meek Mill, Wale	Dreamchasers 2
"Brought Out Them Racks"	2012	Gucci Mane	I'm Up
"I'm Out Here" (Remix)	2012	Dusty McFly, Danny Brown, Peezy, Boldy James	Buffies & Benihanas II
"100 Bottles"	2012	CyHi the Prynce, Chris Brown	Ivy League Club
"Option"	2012	Hit-Boy	HITstory
"I'm So Blessed"	2012	DJ Khaled, Wiz Khalifa, Ace Hood, T-Pain	Kiss the Ring
"The One"	2012	Cruel Summer	Kanye West, 2 Chainz, Marsha Ambrosius
"On Deck"	2012	Sayitainttone, Earlly Mac, Juicy J	Lord n Taylor
"The Mighty Fall"	2013	Fall Out Boy	Save Rock and Roll
"Ol' Skool Pontiac"	2013	Jeremih, Paul Wall	none
"Pussy"	2013	The-Dream, Pusha T	IV Play
"Blame It On the Money"	2013	D'banj, Snoop Dogg	D'Kings Men
"Back from the Dead"	2013	Skylar Grey, Travis Barker	Don't Look Down
"Love Money Party"	2013	Miley Cyrus	Bangerz
"Who I Am"	2013	Pusha T, 2 Chainz	My Name Is My Name
"You Don't Want These Problems"	2013	DJ Khaled, 2 Chainz, Ace Hood, Meek Mill, French Montana, Rick Ross, Timbaland	Suffering from Success
"Shape"	2013	Tinie Tempah	Demonstration
"Memphis"	2013	Justin Bieber	Journal
"Sanctified"	2014	Rick Ross, Kanye West	Mastermind
"Maps" (Remix)	2014	Maroon 5, Reflex	V
"Diamonds"	2014	Common	Nobody's Smiling
"Face Down"	2014	DJ Mustard, Lil Boosie, Lil Wayne, YG	10 Summers
"Intro"	2014	Ty Dolla $ign	$ign Language
"Matimba" (Remix)	2014	Claudia Leitte, MC Guimê	Sette
"Come Away" (Remix)	2014	Elijah Blake	none
"Kingpin"	2014	RL Grime	none
"Ja-Rule"	2014	A$AP Ferg	Ferg Forever
"Y.N.O."	2015	Rae Sremmurd	SremmLife
"Do It Again"	2015	Earlly Mac	none
"Tangerine"	2015	Miley Cyrus	Miley Cyrus and Her Dead Petz
"Workin" (Remix)	2015	Puff Daddy, Travis Scott	MMM
"No Pressure"	2015	Justin Bieber	Purpose
"One of Them"	2015	G-Eazy	When It's Dark Out
"Royalty"	2015	Jeremih, Future	Late Nights
"Man of My City"	2016	French Montana, Travis Scott	Wave Gods
"Buried in Detroit"	2016	Mike Posner	At Night, Alone
"Good Girls"	2016	Nick Jonas	Last Year Was Complicated
"World is Mine"	2016	A$AP Ferg	Always Strive and Prosper
"Work for It"	2016	DJ Khaled, Gucci Mane, 2 Chainz	Major Key
"Light It Up"	2016	Chocolate Droppa, 2 Chainz	Kevin Hart: What Now? (The Mixtape Presents Chocolate Droppa)
"On the Come Up"	2017	Mike Will Made It	Ransom 2
"Down" (Remix)	2017	Marian Hill	Act One (The Complete Collection)
"On Everything"	2017	DJ Khaled, Travis Scott, Rick Ross	Grateful
"Frat Rules"	2017	ASAP Mob, ASAP Rocky, Playboi Carti	Cozy Tapes Vol. 2: Too Cozy
"Moments"	2017	Jhené Aiko	Trip
"OLLA (Only Lovers Left Alive)"	2017	Jhené Aiko	Trip
"Changed"	2017	Gucci Mane	Mr. Davis
"Wassup"	2018	Logic	Bobby Tarantino II
"Aries (YuGo), Part 2"	2018	Mike Will Made It, Pharrell Williams, Quavo, Rae Sremmurd	none
"Momma"	2018	Fat Joe, Dre	none
"Balance"	2019	Icewear Vezzo	none
"Two Cups"	2019	Rich the Kid, Offset	The World Is Yours 2
"Thank You"	2019	DJ Khaled	Father of Asahd
"Ready Set"	2019	Kash Doll	Stacked
"Shoot It Up"	2020	Teyana Taylor	The Album
"Trenches"	2020	Tee Grizzley	The Smartest
"Replace Me"	2020	Nas, Don Toliver	King's Disease
"Tyrone 2021"	2020	Ty Dolla Sign	Featuring Ty Dolla Sign
"Moonlight"	2020	NLE Choppa	From Dark to Light
"Go Crazy"	2020	Megan Thee Stallion, 2 Chainz	Good News
"Still Yours"	2021	Bryson Tiller	Anniversary (Deluxe)
"Warrior"	2021	YSL Records, T-Shyne, Lil Keed	Slime Language 2
"This Is My Year"	2021	DJ Khaled, A Boogie wit da Hoodie, Rick Ross, Puff Daddy	Khaled Khaled
"What We On"	2021	Tee Grizzley	Built for Whatever
"Scary Sight"	2021	Belly	See You Next Wednesday
"Note to Self"	2021	Russ, Joey Badass, Wale	Chomp 2
"Stupid"	2022	The Game	Drillmatic
"Go Off"	2022	Ab-Soul, Russ	Herbert
"Anthem"	2023	Dreamville, EST Gee	Dreamville: Creed III: The Soundtrack
"Hottest"	2023	Lil Keed	Keed Talk To 'Em 2
"Palisades, CA"	2023	Larry June, The Alchemist	The Great Escape
"Master P"	2023	Aminé, Kaytranada	Kaytraminé
"Mula"	2025	Connor Price	About Time
"Lights On"	2026	Kehlani	Kehlani

== Videography ==
=== As lead artist ===
List of music videos as lead artist, showing year released and directors
Title	Year	Director(s)
"Getcha Some"	2009	Hype Williams
"Million Dollars"	2010	Danny Mooney
"Okay" (featuring GLC and King Chip)	2010	Davy Greenberg
"Crazy"	2010	SUPERINTERNATIONAL
"What U Doin?"	2010	Ryan Lightbourn
"My Last" (featuring Chris Brown)	2011	Taj
"I Do It"	2011	Mike Carson
"Marvin & Chardonnay" (featuring Kanye West and Roscoe Dash)	2011	Hype Williams
"Dance (A$$)" (Remix) (featuring Nicki Minaj)	2011	Mike Carson, Mike Waxx
"RWT"	2012	Mike Carson, Mike Waxx
"Mula" (featuring French Montana)	2012	Mike Carson, Mike Waxx
"Guap"	2012	Mike Carson, Mike Waxx
"Beware" (featuring Lil Wayne and Jhené Aiko)	2013	Matthew Williams
"Fire"	2013	Matthew Williams
"10 2 10"	2013	Mike Carson, Mike Waxx
"1st Quarter Freestyle"	2014	Mike Carson
"Ashley" (featuring Miguel)	2014	Ellis Bahl
"I Don't Fuck with You" (featuring E–40)	2014	Lawrence Lamont
"Paradise"	2014	Mike Carson
"Dark Sky (Skyscrapers)"	2015	Andy Hines, Dylan Knight
"Blessings" (featuring Drake and Kanye West)	2015	Darren Craig
"One Man Can Change the World" (featuring Kanye West and John Legend)	2015	Andy Hines
"All Your Fault" (featuring Kanye West)	2015	Mark Mayer, Aaron Platt
"I Know" (featuring Jhené Aiko)	2015	Lawrence Lamont
"Play No Games" (featuring Chris Brown and Ty Dolla $ign)	2015	Mike Carson
"Out of Love" (with Twenty88)	2016	Lawrence Lamont
"Bounce Back"	2016	Glenn Michael and Christo Anesti
"Moves"	2017	Mark Carson
"Halfway Off the Balcony"	2017	Andy Hines
"Light" (featuring Jeremih)	2017	Lawrence Lamont
"Jump Out the Window"	2017	Lawrence Lamont
"Sacrifices" (featuring Migos)	2017	Lawrence Lamont
"Overtime"	2019	none
"Single Again"	2019	Lawrence Lamont
"Bezerk" (featuring ASAP Ferg and Hit-Boy)	2019	Big Sean, ASAP Ferg and Mike Carson
"Harder Than My Demons"	2020	Child
"Lithuania" (featuring Travis Scott)	2020	Mike Carson
"ZTFO"	2020	Lawrence Lamont
"Wolves" (featuring Post Malone)	2020	Kid
"Body Language" (featuring Ty Dolla $ign and Jhene Aiko)	2020	Child
"Deep Reverence" (featuring Nipsey Hussle)	2021	Sergio
"What a Life" (with Hit-Boy)	2021	Joe Weil
"Loyal to a Fault" (with Hit-Boy featuring Bryson Tiller and Lil Durk)	2021	none

=== As featured artist ===
List of music videos as featured artist, showing year released and directors
Title	Year	Director(s)
"My Closet" (Sayitainttone featuring Big Sean)	2011	Ken Koller
"What Yo Name Iz?" (Remix) (Kirko Bangz featuring Wale, Big Sean and Bun B)	2011	Mr. Boomtown
"Oh My" (Remix) (DJ Drama featuring Trey Songz, 2 Chainz and Big Sean)	2011	Decatur Dan
"Lay It on Me" (Kelly Rowland featuring Big Sean)	2011	Sarah Chatfield, Frank Gatson Jr.
"Already There" (John West featuring Big Sean)	2011	Joseph Garner
"Kiss It Bye Bye" (Aleesia featuring Big Sean)	2012	Ryan Lightbourn
"Naked" (Kevin McCall featuring Big Sean)	2012	Chris Brown
"I'm Gone" (Tyga featuring Big Sean)	2012	Colin Tilley
"Slight Work" (Wale featuring Big Sean)	2012	Chris Brown, Godfrey Tabarez
"Mercy" (Kanye West featuring Big Sean, Pusha T and 2 Chainz)	2012	NABIL
"Till I Die" (Chris Brown featuring Big Sean and Wiz Khalifa)	2012	Chris Brown
"My Homies Still" (Lil Wayne featuring Big Sean)	2012	Parris
"Good Girls (Don't Grow on Trees)" (Cris Cab featuring Big Sean)	2012	Alex Moors
"Burn" (Meek Mill featuring Big Sean)	2012	Dre Films
"Show Out" (Juicy J featuring Big Sean and Young Jeezy)	2013	Frank Paladino
"Wild" (Jessie J featuring Big Sean and Dizzee Rascal)	2013	Emil Nava
"The Mighty Fall" (Fall Out Boy featuring Big Sean)	2013	DONALD/ZAEH
"Back from the Dead" (Skylar Grey featuring Big Sean)	2013	David Rosenberg
"Right There" (Ariana Grande featuring Big Sean)	2013	Nev Todorovic
"All That (Lady)" (Game featuring Lil Wayne, Big Sean, Fabolous and Jeremih)	2013	Ben Griffin
"Top of the World" (Mike Posner featuring Big Sean)	2013	Jon Jon
"Diamonds" (Common featuring Big Sean)	2014	Jerome D. Hurd
"Don't Play" (Travis Scott featuring Big Sean and The 1975)	2014	Travis Scott
"Detroit Vs. Everybody" (Eminem, Royce Da 5'9, Big Sean, Danny Brown, Dej Loaf and Trick-Trick)	2014	Syndrome
"B-Boy" (Meek Mill featuring Big Sean and A$AP Ferg)	2015	Spike Jordan
"How Many Times" (DJ Khaled featuring Chris Brown, Lil Wayne and Big Sean)	2015	Collin Tilley
"Open Wide" (Calvin Harris featuring Big Sean)	2015	Emil Nava
"Fighting Shadows" (Jane Zhang featuring Big Sean)	2015	Robby Starbuck
"Back Up" (Dej Loaf featuring Big Sean)	2015	Alex Nazari
"Workin (Remix)" (Puff Daddy featuring Travis Scott and Big Sean)	2015	Hype Williams
"No Pressure" (Justin Bieber featuring Big Sean)	2016	Paris Goebel
"Skateboard P (Remix)" (MadeinTYO featuring Big Sean)	2017	Daniel Yaro
"I Think of You" (Jeremih featuring Chris Brown and Big Sean)	2017	Daniel Cz
"On The Come Up" (Mike WiLL Made-It featuring Big Sean)	2017	Mike Pisctelli
"On Everything" (DJ Khaled featuring Travis Scott, Rick Ross and Big Sean)	2017	Eif Rivera
"Feels" (Calvin Harris featuring Pharrell Williams, Katy Perry and Big Sean)	2017	Emil Nava
"Feels" (version 2) (Calvin Harris featuring Pharrell Williams, Katy Perry and Big Sean)	2017	Emil Nava
"Miracles (Someone Special)" (Coldplay with Big Sean)	2017	Ben Mor
"Alone" (Halsey featuring Big Sean and Stefflon Don)	2018	Halsey and Hannah Lux Davis
"Big Bank" (YG featuring 2 Chainz, Big Sean and Nicki Minaj)	2018	Teddy Cecil
"Aries (YuGo)" (Part 2) (Remix) (Mike Will Made It featuring Big Sean, Pharrell, Quavo and Rae Sremmurd)	2018	Benjamin Newman
"Jealous" (DJ Khaled featuring Chris Brown, Lil Wayne and Big Sean)	2019	Joseph Kahn
"Balance" (Icewear Vezzo featuring Big Sean)	2019	Kid Art
"None Of Your Concern" (Jhene Aiko featuring Big Sean)	2019	none
"Mula" (Connor Price featuring Big Sean)	2025	Kevin Eurele
