= Double or Nothing (Big Sean and Metro Boomin album) =

Studio album by Big Sean and Metro Boomin
- Released: December 8, 2017
- Recorded: 2017
- Genre: Hip-hop; trap
- Length: 41:28
- Label: GOOD; Boominati; Def Jam; Republic
- Producer: Metro Boomin (also exec.); Big Sean (exec.); Kanye West (exec.); Earlly Mac; Pi'erre Bourne; Southside

Big Sean chronology
I Decided (2017)	Double or Nothing (2017)	Detroit 2 (2020)

Metro Boomin chronology
Without Warning (2017)	Double or Nothing (2017)	Not All Heroes Wear Capes (2018)

Singles from Double or Nothing
- 1. "Pull Up N Wreck" Released: November 3, 2017; 2. "So Good" Released: February 13, 2018

Double or Nothing is a collaborative studio album by American rapper Big Sean and American record producer Metro Boomin. The album was released on December 8, 2017, by GOOD Music, Def Jam Recordings, Boominati Worldwide, and Republic Records. It features guest appearances from Travis Scott, 2 Chainz, 21 Savage, Kash Doll, Young Thug, and Swae Lee. The album's production was handled primarily by Metro Boomin, alongside Earlly Mac, Pi'erre Bourne and Southside.

The album was supported by two singles: "Pull Up N Wreck" featuring 21 Savage and "So Good" featuring Kash Doll.

The album received a mixed reception from critics, with some praising the chemistry between Big Sean and Metro Boomin, while others felt the project lacked cohesion. The album debuted at No. 5 on the Billboard 200, but it didn't achieve the kind of commercial success that some of their previous solo efforts had.

== Background ==
In an interview with Billboard published on December 1, 2017, Big Sean announced the collaborative album. The two previously worked on Sean's previous studio album, I Decided (2017), on the single "Bounce Back" and album tracks "Sacrifices" and "Voices in My Head / Stick to the Plan". The album art and release date was announced on December 6, 2017, while the track listing was announced via social media the following day, the day before release.

The intro song, "Go Legend" featuring Travis Scott, was previewed by Sean at Lollapalooza 2017 in Chicago. The song originally was thought to have Offset as an additional feature but did not make the studio version of the song.

Songs from the album were previewed by American athlete LeBron James via Instagram the day before release.

== Singles ==
The lead single, "Pull Up N Wreck" featuring 21 Savage, was released on November 3, 2017, for streaming and digital download. "So Good" featuring Kash Doll was sent to rhythmic radio on February 13, 2018, as the album's second single.

== Critical reception ==
Professional ratings
Aggregate scores
Source	Rating
Metacritic	54/100
Review scores
Source	Rating
The 405	5.5/10
AllMusic	3/5 stars
HipHopDX	2.6/5
HotNewHipHop	74%
Pitchfork	5.4/10
Sputnikmusic	2.7/5

Double or Nothing received mixed reviews from critics upon release, with a general criticism of the collaborative pairing. At Metacritic, which assigns a normalized rating out of 100 to reviews from mainstream publications, the album received an average score of 54, based on 4 reviews. Claire Lobenfeld of Pitchfork criticised the album's lyricism, stating that "Though fun and at times politically salient, even Metro Boomin cannot rescue Big Sean from his habit of writing the absolute corniest lyrics imaginable." Chase McMullen of The 405 commented that "There's no denying Big Sean has had more staying power in hip hop than some might have expected, but for Metro Boomin, who's largely been wise in choosing fresh faces on equal creative footing for his full length projects, Double or Nothing is a dull misstep." In another mixed review, Trent Clark of HipHopDX concluded: "While the essential purpose of the album is never specified, Sean spends a ridiculous amount of time skeeting on tracks with no filter on the filler."

Online music publication Sputnikmusic stated Double or Nothing is "ostensibly 10 bangers processed through Metro’s lean, gothic synths and Sean’s plain-spoken statements of wealth and general overconfidence. It’s boring stuff."

Joshua Robinson from hnhh stated than the album "demonstrated the next step in Big Sean’s growth“ and singled songs like “Who’s Stopping Me“ and the off-kilter “Even The Odds“ and concludes with the statement: “Love it or hate it, Double or Nothing had plenty of highlights.“

== Legacy ==
In retrospect, Big Sean described Double or Nothing as a “straight fun“, experimental project where he stepped out of his usual creative process. Metro encouraged him to freestyle without overthinking, leading to quick, instinctive recordings. "He wanted me to record like how Future records... whatever comes to your first mind, get on the mic, say that shit, and we’re moving on." Although some fans loved the album and others didn't, Sean expressed that he “loved“ it, viewing it as part of his creative evolution, especially after experiencing burnout in 2017. In a March 2025 interview on the St. Brown Podcast, he explained, "Art is subjective... Anything could always be better. I was just vibing out." He also mentioned that releasing Double or Nothing just months after I Decided (which hit No. 1) allowed him to "maximize [his] creativity".

In interviews, Metro Boomin reflects on the reception of Double or Nothing in and shares his perspective on the criticism the album received. In a conversation with GQ, Metro acknowledges having been affected by the negative response: "I still do like the album," he says, but emphasizes that much of the backlash was rooted in online criticism directed at Big Sean. He defends the rapper, stating, "A lot of those songs, or a lot of the sh*t that he said — if another huge rapper or rappers similar to him said it, they would just let it slide." Speaking on the ProducerGrind podcast, Metro expands on this point, explaining that the album differed sonically from what fans expected — not only based on his collaborations with Future but also on previous tracks with Big Sean such as "Bounce Back", "Research" and "Sacrifices". "I feel like they just wanted that — they wanted me to give Big Sean just a whole bunch of street beats." Instead, the project surprised listeners: "It wasn’t what n****s thought it was going to be. So I feel like they were just like, ‘WTF??’"

Despite the criticism, Metro remains proud of the work: "That album still hard as f*** to me. I know it’s hard." He believes the project would be more appreciated if released today: "I feel like if we held that album and dropped it right now, ns be like, ‘Ooh! That sht is hard as f.’" He continues to defend the collaboration, highlighting that it featured "a lot of hard, solid songs" and a cohesive artistic vision.

== Commercial performance ==
Double or Nothing debuted at number six on the US Billboard 200 and number two on the US Top R&B/Hip-Hop Albums chart, with 50,000 album-equivalent units, of which 10,000 were pure album sales in its first week of release.

== Track listing ==
Credits adapted from Tidal.

Double or Nothing
No.	Title	Writer(s)	Producer(s)	Length
1.	"Go Legend" (featuring Travis Scott)	Sean Anderson; Leland Wayne; Jacques Webster II; Gerry Goffin; Michael Masser	Metro Boomin	4:28
2.	"Big Bidness" (featuring 2 Chainz)	Anderson; Wayne; Tauheed Epps	Metro Boomin	4:33
3.	"Who's Stopping Me"	Anderson; Wayne; Earl Taylor; Gabriel Almizinho	Metro Boomin; Earlly Mac	3:33
4.	"Pull Up N Wreck" (featuring 21 Savage)	Anderson; Wayne; Shayaa Abraham-Joseph; Taylor; Joshua Luellen	Metro Boomin; Southside	3:47
5.	"So Good" (featuring Kash Doll)	Anderson; Wayne; Arkeisha Knight	Metro Boomin	4:28
6.	"Savage Time"	Anderson; Wayne; Webster; Christopher Elliot	Metro Boomin	5:35
7.	"Even the Odds" (featuring Young Thug)	Anderson; Wayne; Jeffery Williams; Radric Davis; Taylor	Metro Boomin	3:46
8.	"In Tune"	Anderson; Wayne; David Goldsmith; Christopher Young	Metro Boomin	4:15
9.	"Reason" (featuring Swae Lee)	Anderson; Wayne; Khalif Brown; Jordan Jenks	Metro Boomin; Pi'erre Bourne	3:18
10.	"No Hearts, No Love"	Anderson; Wayne; Shuggie Otis	Metro Boomin	3:45
Total length:				41:28

Notes

- "Savage Time" features additional vocals from Travis Scott
- "Even the Odds" features additional vocals from Gucci Mane

Sample credits

- "Go Legend" contains samples from "Theme from Mahogany (Do You Know Where You're Going To)", performed by Diana Ross
- "Who's Stopping Me" contains samples from "Clarão da Lua", performed by Nazaré Pereira.
- "In Tune" contains samples from "Up Against the Wind", performed by Lori Perry.
- "No Hearts, No Love" contains samples from "Strawberry Letter 23", performed by the Brothers Johnson.

== Personnel ==
Credits adapted from Tidal.

Performers

- Big Sean – primary artist, vocals, songwriting (all tracks)
- Metro Boomin – primary artist, production, songwriting (all tracks)
- Travis Scott – featured artist (track 1)
- 2 Chainz – featured artist (track 2)
- 21 Savage – featured artist (track 4)
- Kash Doll – featured artist (track 5)
- Young Thug – featured artist (track 7)
- Swae Lee – featured artist (track 9)

Musicians

- Chris Harrington – musical director (track 10)
- The Atlanta Boys Choir – choir (track 10)

Technical

- Gregg Rominiecki – recording (all tracks)
- Maximilian Jaeger – recording (all tracks)
- Kuldeep Chudasama – recording assistant (tracks 1, 4, 6)
- Jim Caruana – recording (track 6)
- Miguel Scott – recording assistant (track 9)
- Ethan Stevens – mixing (all tracks), recording (track 9)
- Joe LaPorta – mastering (all tracks)

Additional personnel

- Sarah Rountree – project manager
- Gunner Stahl – photography
- Jason Lee – cover photo
- Omar Rajput – art direction
- Mike Carson – creative director

== Charts ==
=== Weekly charts ===
Chart (2017)	Peak position
Belgian Albums (Ultratop Flanders)	106
Belgian Albums (Ultratop Wallonia)	199
Canadian Albums (Billboard)	15
Dutch Albums (Album Top 100)	43
French Albums (SNEP)	164
Latvian Albums (LaIPA)	18
New Zealand Heatseeker Albums (RMNZ)	1
Norwegian Albums (VG-lista)	32
Swedish Albums (Sverigetopplistan)	45
UK Albums (OCC)	96
US Billboard 200	6
US Top R&B/Hip-Hop Albums (Billboard)	2

=== Year-end charts ===
Chart (2018)	Position
US Top R&B/Hip-Hop Albums (Billboard)	84
