= Finally Famous =

Finally Famous may refer to:

- Finally Famous: Born a Thug, Still a Thug, 2009 album by Tricky Daddy
- Finally Famous (Big Sean album), 2011 album by Big Sean
- Finally Famous Vol. 2: UKNOWBIGSEAN, 2009 mixtape by Big Sean
- Finally Famous Vol. 3: Big, 2010 mixtape by Big Sean
- Phinally Phamous, 2004 album by Lil Wyte
- Top Five, a 2014 film directed by Chris Rock, originally titled Finally Famous
