= Wolves (Big Sean song) =

2020 song by Big Sean

Single by Big Sean featuring Post Malone

from the album Detroit 2
- Released: September 19, 2020
- Length: 3:19
- Label: GOOD; Def Jam
- Songwriters: Sean Anderson; Austin Post; Rakim Mayers; Louis Bell; Earl Taylor; David Biral; Denzel Baptiste; Travis Walton; Samuel Austin Blair Bonhart
- Producers: Take a Daytrip; Walton; Bonhart

Big Sean singles chronology
"Deep Reverence" (2020)	"Wolves" (2020)	"Timeless" (2020)

Post Malone singles chronology
"Tap In (Remix)" (2020)	"Wolves" (2020)	"Spicy" (2020)

Music video
- "Wolves" on YouTube

"Wolves" is a song by American rapper Big Sean featuring American musician Post Malone. It was sent to rhythmic contemporary radio on September 19, 2020, as the second single from the former's fifth studio album Detroit 2. The song was written alongside additional vocalist A$AP Rocky and producers Take a Daytrip, Teddy Walton, and Samuel Bonhart.

== Background and composition ==
The "motivational" song sees Big Sean rapping about being raised to overcome obstacles, while Post Malone adds melodic vocals to the track. Prior to its release, the song was previewed by Take a Daytrip on September 29, 2019 on Instagram Live. In an interview with Entertainment Weekly in October 2019, Sean stated that the song was about "my family growing up. Everybody's in there, my grandma, my mom, my brother — it's like they were a pack of wolves and they were the sweetest and strongest. It's one of my favorites on the album." When asked how he collaborated with Post Malone, he said:

Post Malone heard it early. I ran into him at a restaurant, and we were kicking it. It was like a mutual-respect-type of exchange. We were both working, so I'm like, "I got this song. See what you think." When I sent it to him he was like, "Man, this is incredible. I have to, let's do it." A$AP Rocky is on there too, at the very beginning just doing some ad-libs.

Big Sean also revealed in that interview that ASAP Rocky originally had a verse on the song, but it was moved to another song on Detroit 2.

== Music video ==
The official music video was released on November 20, 2020. It features a cameo from Big Sean's mother, Myra Anderson. The rappers "trade haunting verses in a sleek white warehouse", and also in front of a big red circle resembling a super blood wolf moon.

== Charts ==
Chart (2020)	Peak position
Canada Hot 100 (Billboard)	56
US Billboard Hot 100	65
US Hot R&B/Hip-Hop Songs (Billboard)	24
US Rhythmic Airplay (Billboard)	20

== Certifications ==
Region	Certification	Certified units/sales
Brazil (Pro-Música Brasil)	Platinum	40,000^{‡}
New Zealand (RMNZ)	Gold	15,000^{‡}
United States (RIAA)	Platinum	1,000,000^{‡}
^{‡} Sales+streaming figures based on certification alone.
