= Detroit 2 =

Studio album by Big Sean
- Released: September 4, 2020
- Genre: Hip-hop
- Length: 71:19
- Labels: GOOD; Def Jam
- Producers: Amaire Johnson; Boi-1da; Cool & Dre; Darhyl Camper; Dee Lilly; DJ Dahi; G Dav; G. Ry; Helluva; Hit-Boy; Jay John Henry; Kaelin Capron; Key Wane; Mike Will Made It; Mustard; No I.D.; Take a Daytrip; TT Audi

Big Sean chronology
| Double or Nothing (2017) | Detroit 2 (2020) | What You Expect (2021) |

Singles from Detroit 2
- 1. "Deep Reverence" Released: August 25, 2020; 2. "Wolves" Released: September 19, 2020

Detroit 2 is the fifth studio album by American rapper Big Sean, released through GOOD Music on September 4, 2020, with distribution handled by Def Jam Recordings. The album serves as a sequel to Sean's 2012 mixtape, Detroit. It features guest appearances from Eminem, Royce da 5'9", Dwele, Post Malone, Young Thug, Travis Scott, Lil Wayne, Diddy, Kash Doll, and Nipsey Hussle, among others. The deluxe edition includes additional features from ASAP Ferg and Hit-Boy.

The album received generally positive reviews from music critics and was a commercial success. It debuted at number one on the US Billboard 200 chart, earning 103,000 album-equivalent units in its first week.

== Release and promotion ==
Big Sean had originally planned to announce the album on March 13, 2020, coinciding with "313 Day", an annual celebration of Detroit; however, this announcement was delayed due to the COVID-19 pandemic. Sean instead announced the album later in March, with no release date specified. In late August, Sean announced over Twitter that the release date of the album would be September 4, 2020. The album is Sean's final album released under Kanye West's Def Jam-distributed imprint, GOOD Music.

=== Singles ===
"Deep Reverence" featuring American rapper Nipsey Hussle, was released on August 25, 2020, as the album's lead single. The music video was released on March 5, 2021. The song peaked at number 82 on the US Billboard Hot 100.

The album's second single, "Wolves" featuring American singer Post Malone, was sent to rhythmic contemporary radio on September 19, 2020. The music video was released on November 20, 2020. The song peaked at number 65 on the Billboard Hot 100.

=== Promotional singles ===
The album's first promotional single, "Harder than My Demons", was released on August 31, 2020, as well an accompanying music video. The song peaked at number four on the US Bubbling Under Hot 100.

=== Other songs ===
The music video for "Lithuania" featuring American rapper Travis Scott, was released on September 4, 2020. The music video for "ZTFO", was released on September 17, 2020. The music video for "Body Language" featuring American singers Ty Dolla Sign and Jhené Aiko, was released on December 16, 2020.

== Critical reception ==
Professional ratings
Aggregate scores
| Source | Rating |
|---|---|
| AnyDecentMusic? | 6.4/10 |
| Metacritic | 71/100 |
Review scores
| Source | Rating |
| AllMusic | 4/5 stars |
| Beats Per Minute | 60% |
| Clash | 7/10 |
| Consequence | B+ |
| HipHopDX | 3.5/5 |
| NME | 3/5 stars |
| Pitchfork | 5.2/10 |
| Tom Hull – on the Web | B+ |

Detroit 2 was met with generally positive reviews. At Metacritic, which assigns a normalized rating out of 100 to reviews from professional publications, the album received an average score of 71, based on eight reviews. Aggregator AnyDecentMusic? gave it 6.4 out of 10, based on their assessment of the critical consensus.

Fred Thomas of AllMusic praised the album, stating, "The production is clean and engaging, with polished beats and the occasional glossy hook providing a contrast for Big Sean's visceral rhymes and urgently delivered performances". Reviewing the album for Clash, Robin Murray stated, "Detroit 2 has that passion, that willingness to progress. Equal parts entertaining and wide, it finds the rapper coming full circle, only to find himself once more". In a positive review, A. D. Amorosi of Variety wrote that "Big Sean makes Detroit 2 a real and righteous place, even if he has to use a handful of holy clichés to prove it". Rashad Grove of Consequence said, "Undoubtedly, Big Sean's growth as an artist and, more importantly, as a human being is the scarlet thread that ties Detroit 2 together. The complexity of the human experience, as told from the vast experiences of Sean's own life, comes shining through". HipHopDX's reviewer Mark Elibert stated in his review that "Detroit 2 shows when Big Sean opens up and tells his story he's an artist worthy of being in the conversation of the best of his era. He just needs to come back stronger with more airtight songs and not attempt to attract every audience that's out there".

In a lukewarm review, NME's Will Lavin wrote, "Although it can be overblown, Sean's passion is unreserved here, the record peppered with Instagram-worthy captions that urge listeners to take inspiration from their surroundings while keeping friends and family close. This is why Sean's name continues to stay on the lips of rap connoisseurs almost a decade after his debut". In a mixed review, Pitchfork's Drew Millard stated: "On his fifth solo album, Big Sean gets personal, leans on a slate of high-profile guests to provide most of the entertainment, and struggles to deliver anything that isn't fundamentally embarrassing."

=== Year-end lists ===
Select year-end rankings of Detroit 2
| Publication | List | Rank | Ref. |
|---|---|---|---|
| Complex | The Best Albums of 2020 | 49 | |
| HotNewHipHop | Top 25 Hottest Hip-Hop Albums of 2020 | 24 | |

== Commercial performance ==
Detroit 2 debuted at number one on the US Billboard 200 with 103,000 album-equivalent units (including 30,000 pure album sales) in its first week. This became Sean's third US number-one debut and his seventh top-ten album. The album also accumulated a total of 93.55 million on-demand US streams from all its tracks, in the week ending September 19, 2020. In its second week, the album dropped to number seven on the chart, earning an additional 37,000 units. On October 20, 2022, Detroit 2 was certified gold by the Recording Industry Association of America (RIAA) for combined sales, streaming and track-sales equivalent of over half a million units in the United States.

== Track listing ==
Detroit 2 track listing
| No. | Title | Writer(s) | Producer(s) | Length |
|---|---|---|---|---|
| 1. | "Why Would I Stop?" | Sean Anderson; Chauncey Hollis; Rogét Chahayed | Hit-Boy; Chahayed^{[a]} | 2:32 |
| 2. | "Lucky Me" | S. Anderson; Hollis; Dacoury Natche; Chahayed; Travis Walton; Benny Soebardja^{[c]} | Hit-Boy; DJ Dahi; Chahayed^{[b]}; Teddy Walton^{[b]} | 4:08 |
| 3. | "Deep Reverence" (featuring Nipsey Hussle) | S. Anderson; Ermias Asghedom; Hollis; Ryan Martinez; Chahayed; Rafeal Brown; Stephen Feigenbaum | Hit-Boy; G. Ry^{[a]}; Chahayed^{[b]}; Audio Anthem^{[b]}; Johan Lenox^{[b]} | 3:51 |
| 4. | "Wolves" (featuring Post Malone) | S. Anderson; Austin Post; Rakim Mayers; Earl Taylor; David Biral; Denzel Baptiste; Walton; Samuel Austin Blair Bonhart | Take a Daytrip; Walton^{[b]}; Bonhart^{[b]} | 3:19 |
| 5. | "Body Language" (featuring Ty Dolla Sign and Jhené Aiko) | S. Anderson; Tyrone Griffin, Jr.; Jhené Chilombo; Dwane Weir II; Justin Johnson; Shawn Harris^{[d]} | Key Wane; Jay John Henry | 3:44 |
| 6. | "Story by Dave Chappelle" | S. Anderson; Chahayed | | 2:35 |
| 7. | "Harder than My Demons" | S. Anderson; Cydel Young; Michael Williams II; Amaire Johnson; J. Johnson; Walton; Khalil Abdul-Rahman; Thomas Whitfield | Mike Will Made It; Henry; DJ Khalil^{[a]}; A. Johnson^{[b]}; Walton^{[b]} | 2:11 |
| 8. | "Everything That's Missing" (featuring Dwele) | S. Anderson; Andwele Gardner; Biral; Baptiste; Feigenbaum; Walton; A. Johnson; Gregg Rominiecki | A. Johnson; Big Sean^{[b]}; Take a Daytrip^{[b]}; Johan Lenox^{[b]}; Walton^{[b]}; Rominiecki^{[b]}; Aaron Bow^{[b]} | 3:14 |
| 9. | "ZTFO" | S. Anderson; Jacques Webster II; Marcello Valenzano; Andre Lyon; Joshua Leon; Ernest Wilson; Chahayed; Walton | Cool & Dre; Spanish Josh^{[a]}; No I.D.^{[b]}; Chahayed^{[b]}; Walton^{[b]} | 2:16 |
| 10. | "Guard Your Heart" (featuring Anderson .Paak, Earlly Mac and Wale) | S. Anderson; Brandon Anderson; Taylor; Olubowale Akintimehin; Hollis; Chahayed; Dustin Corbett; Nicholas Race | Hit-Boy; Corbett^{[a]}; Chahayed^{[b]} | 4:18 |
| 11. | "Respect It" (featuring Young Thug and Hit-Boy) | S. Anderson; Jeffery Williams; Hollis; Taylor; Brook Rowland; Greg Davis; Corbett; Race | Hit-Boy; G Dav^{[a]}; Corbett^{[a]} | 3:27 |
| 12. | "Lithuania" (featuring Travis Scott) | S. Anderson; Webster; Hollis; Brown | Hit-Boy; Audio Anthem^{[b]} | 3:19 |
| 13. | "Full Circle" (featuring Key Wane and Diddy) | S. Anderson; Weir; Sean Combs; Didier Marouani^{[e]} | Key Wane | 2:58 |
| 14. | "Time In" (performed by Twenty88) | S. Anderson; Chilombo; Dijon McFarlane; Weir; Chahayed; Anthony Jeffries^{[f]}; Daniel Daley^{[f]}; Majid Al Maskati^{[f]}; Maneesh Bidaye^{[f]}; Stephen Garrett^{[f]}; Benjamin Bush^{[f]}; Timothy Mosley^{[f]} | Mustard; Key Wane; Chahayed^{[b]} | 2:57 |
| 15. | "Story by Erykah Badu" | S. Anderson; Chayahed; Erica Wright | | 2:10 |
| 16. | "Feed" | S. Anderson; Matthew Samuels; Kaelin Capron; Walton; Tom Kahre; Tahrence Brown | Boi-1da; Capron; TT Audi; Walton^{[b]}; Kahre^{[b]} | 3:02 |
| 17. | "The Baddest" | S. Anderson; Wilson; Akira Ifukube^{[g]} | No I.D. | 3:09 |
| 18. | "Don Life" (featuring Lil Wayne) | S. Anderson; Dwayne Carter, Jr.; Taylor; Weir; Hollis; A. Johnson; Feigenbaum; Walton; John Bettis^{[h]}; Steve Porcaro^{[h]} | Key Wane; Hit-Boy^{[b]}; A. Johnson^{[b]}; Bow^{[b]}; Johan Lenox^{[b]}; Walton^{[b]} | 3:14 |
| 19. | "Friday Night Cypher" (featuring Tee Grizzley, Kash Doll, Cash Kidd, Payroll, 42 Dugg, Boldy James, Drego, Sada Baby, Royce da 5'9" and Eminem) | S. Anderson; Terry Wallace, Jr.; Arkeisha Knight; Cash Kidd; Dior Giovanni Petty; Dion Hayes; James Jones; Curtis Rafael; Samuel Johnson^{[i]}; Casada Sorrell; Ryan Montgomery; Marshall Mathers; Rowland; Deandre Pearson; Hollis; Weir; J. Johnson; Martin McCurtis; Gene Thornton^{[i]}; Terrence Thornton^{[i]}; Pharrell Williams^{[i]}; Chad Hugo^{[i]}; Jason Phillips^{[i]}; David Styles^{[i]} | Hit-Boy; Key Wane; Henry; G. Ry; Helluva | 9:28 |
| 20. | "Story by Stevie Wonder" | S. Anderson; Chahayed | | 2:13 |
| 21. | "Still I Rise" (featuring Dom Kennedy) | S. Anderson; Dominic Hunn; Abdul-Rahman; Darhyl Camper | Camper; DJ Khalil^{[a]}; Kahre^{[b]} | 3:07 |

Deluxe edition (bonus tracks)
| No. | Title | Writer(s) | Producer(s) | Length |
|---|---|---|---|---|
| 23. | "Overtime" | S. Anderson; Hollis; Weir; the Tucker Brothers | Hit-Boy; Key Wane; the Tucker Brothers | 3:23 |
| 24. | "Single Again" | S. Anderson; A. Johnson; Cameron Osteen; Biral; Dee Lilly; Baptiste; Mike City^{[j]}; Feigenbaum; Griffin | Big Sean; Dee Lilly; Cam O'bi; Take a Daytrip^{[a]}; A. Johnson^{[b]}; Johan Lenox^{[b]} | 3:23 |
| 25. | "Bezerk" (featuring ASAP Ferg and Hit-Boy) | Anderson; Hollis; Darold Brown; Corbett; Davis | Hit-Boy; G Dav; Corbett^{[a]} | 2:30 |

iTunes Store edition
| No. | Title | Length |
|---|---|---|
| 22. | "Harder than My Demons" (music video) | 2:22 |

Notes

- ^{^[a]} signifies a co-producer
- ^{^[b]} signifies an additional producer
- "Feed" is stylized in all caps

Sample credits

- ^{^[c]} "Lucky Me" contains samples of "Bingung", written by Benny Soebardja, as performed by Shark Move.
- ^{^[d]} "Body Language" contains samples of "Soulful Moaning", written and performed by Shawn Demean Harris.
- ^{^[e]} "Full Circle" contains samples of "Baby's Paradise", written by Didier Marouani, and performed by Space.
- ^{^[f]} "Time In" contains samples of "Too Deep", written by Anthony Paul Jeffries, Daniel Daley, Majid Al Maskati, Maneesh Bidaye, Stephen Garrett, Benjamin Bush and Timothy Mosley, as performed by Dvsn.
- ^{^[g]} "The Baddest" contains samples of "Gojira Tai Mosura", written and performed by Akira Ifukube, taken from the motion picture soundtrack of Godzilla vs. Mothra.
- ^{^[h]} "Don Life" contains samples of "Human Nature", written by John Bettis and Steve Porcaro, as performed by Michael Jackson.
- ^{^[i]} "Friday Night Cypher" contains samples of "Grindin'", written by Gene Thornton, Terrence Thornton, Pharrell Williams and Chad Hugo, as performed by Clipse; and samples from "We Gonna Make It", written by Jason Phillips, David Styles, Alan Maman and Samuel Johnson, as performed by Jadakiss, which itself samples "My Music", written and performed by Jackson.
- ^{^[j]} "Single Again" contains samples of "I Wish", written by Mike City and Carl Thomas, as performed by Carl Thomas.

== Personnel ==
Musicians

- Comic J Will – additional vocals (3)
- Johan Lenox – additional vocals (3, 18), string arrangement (3, 8, 18, 24), programming (8, 18), keyboards (18)
- Yasmeen Al-Mazeedi – violin (3, 8, 18, 24)
- ASAP Rocky – additional vocals (4)
- Gregg Rominiecki – additional vocals (4)
- Rogét Chahayed – keyboards (6, 15, 20)
- Dave Chappelle – spoken word (6)
- Anthony "Jawan" McEastland – background vocals (7)
- Chelsea West – background vocals (7)
- Justin Bieber – background vocals (7)
- Nikki Grier – background vocals (7)
- James Anderson – additional vocals (8, 16)
- David Young – horn (8)
- Travis Scott – additional vocals (9)
- No I.D. – drums (9), drum programming (17)
- Keith Sweat – additional vocals (14)
- Erykah Badu – spoken word (15)
- Kyle Stewart – additional vocals (18)
- Meek Mill – additional vocals (18)
- Stevie Wonder – spoken word (20)
- Kierra Sheard – background vocals (21)
- Marc Bolin – sousaphone (21), tuba (21)
- Lemar Guillary – trombone (21)
- Darhyl "DJ" Camper Jr. – trumpet (21)
- Dontae Winslow – trumpet (21)
- Emile Martinez – trumpet (21)
- Michael Cotton – trumpet (21)
- Jhené Aiko – background vocals (24)
- Ty Dolla Sign – background vocals (24)

Technical

- Colin Leonard – mastering engineer (all tracks)
- Gregg Rominiecki – mixer (1–5, 7–14, 16–18, 20, 21, 23, 25), recording engineer (1–5, 7–14, 16–21, 23–25), recording arranger (19)
- Manny Marroquin – mixer (19)
- Tom Kahre – recording engineer (1–5, 7–14, 16–21, 23), vocal producer (5, 12), recording arranger (19)
- Hit-Boy – recording engineer (3), recording arranger (19)
- Barrington Hall – recording engineer (19)
- Omar Loya – recording engineer (19)
- Witt – recording arranger (19)
- Alec Foss – assistant mixer (1, 2, 4, 5, 11, 12, 18)
- Hector Fernandez – assistant mixer (3, 8–10, 13, 14, 16, 17, 21)
- Andy Gurerrero – assistant mixer (4, 18)
- David Kim – mixer (23), recording engineer (25)
- Jaycen Joshua – mixer (24)
- DJ Riggins – assistant mixer (24)
- Jacob Richards – assistant mixer (24)
- Mike Seaberg – assistant mixer (24)

== Charts ==
=== Weekly charts ===
Chart performance for Detroit 2
| Chart (2020) | Peak position |
|---|---|
| Australian Albums (ARIA) | 22 |
| Austrian Albums (Ö3 Austria) | 71 |
| Belgian Albums (Ultratop Flanders) | 59 |
| Belgian Albums (Ultratop Wallonia) | 136 |
| Canadian Albums (Billboard) | 3 |
| Danish Albums (Hitlisten) | 38 |
| Dutch Albums (Album Top 100) | 26 |
| French Albums (SNEP) | 184 |
| Irish Albums (Official Charts) | 34 |
| New Zealand Albums (RMNZ) | 16 |
| Swiss Albums (Schweizer Hitparade) | 31 |
| UK Albums (Official Charts) | 24 |
| US Billboard 200 | 1 |
| US Top R&B/Hip-Hop Albums (Billboard) | 1 |

=== Year-end charts ===
2020 year-end chart performance for Detroit 2
| Chart (2020) | Position |
|---|---|
| US Billboard 200 | 179 |
| US Top R&B/Hip-Hop Albums (Billboard) | 66 |

== Certifications ==
Certifications and sales for Detroit 2
| Region | Certification | Certified units/sales |
|---|---|---|
| United States (RIAA) | Gold | 500,000^{‡} |
^{‡} Sales+streaming figures based on certification alone.
