= Pull Up N Wreck =

2017 song by Big Sean and Metro Boomin featuring 21 Savage

Single by Big Sean and Metro Boomin featuring 21 Savage

from the album Double or Nothing
- Released: November 3, 2017
- Length: 3:47
- Label: GOOD; Def Jam; Republic; Universal; Boominati
- Songwriters: Sean Anderson; Leland Wayne; Shayaa Abraham-Joseph; Earl Taylor; Joshua Luellen
- Producers: Metro Boomin; Southside

Big Sean singles chronology
"Feels" (2017)	"Pull Up N Wreck" (2017)	"So Good" (2018)

Metro Boomin singles chronology
"Ric Flair Drip" (2017)	"Pull Up N Wreck" (2017)	"So Good" (2018)

21 Savage singles chronology
"Rockstar" (2017)	"Pull Up N Wreck" (2017)	"Crisis" (2017)

"Pull Up N Wreck" is a song by American rapper Big Sean and American record producer Metro Boomin. It was released on November 3, 2017 as the lead single from their collaborative studio album Double or Nothing (2017). The song features British-American rapper 21 Savage and was produced by Metro Boomin and Southside.

== Background ==
Big Sean and Metro Boomin teased the song on social media shortly before the release, without mentioning 21 Savage's feature and keeping it a surprise.

== Composition ==
The song, described as "jumpy" and uptempo, finds Big Sean and 21 Savage rapping about "what they're capable of when they show up to the scene". It contains references to the video game GoldenEye 007, as well as a sample of a gunshot from the game.

== Critical reception ==
The song received generally positive reviews. Kevin Goddard of HotNewHipHop gave the song a "Very Hot" rating and commented, "This shit hard!" Nicolaus Li of Hypebeast wrote, "'Pull Up N Wreck' features a simple hook and infectious beat". Likewise, Tom Breihan of Stereogum described the song as having a "truly sticky hook". In an otherwise negative review of Double or Nothing, Trent Clark wrote, "With the exception of the 21 Savage-featuring 'Pull Up N Wreck,' which packs a massive beat, none of the records indicate there's enough chemistry between the two All-Star artists to deserve a full-length offering."

Contrarily, Vince Rick of HotNewHipHop wrote that the song "belongs more to 21 Savage than to Sean, and highlights the incompatibility between artist and producer."

== Charts ==
Chart (2017)	Peak position
Canada Hot 100 (Billboard)	82
US Billboard Hot 100	80
US Hot R&B/Hip-Hop Songs (Billboard)	33
US Rhythmic Airplay (Billboard)	23
