= Fire (Big Sean song) =

Song by Big Sean

Single by Big Sean

from the album Hall of Fame
- Released: August 20, 2013
- Recorded: 2013
- Genre: Hip hop
- Length: 4:22
- Label: GOOD; Def Jam
- Songwriters: Sean Anderson; Darhyl Camper Jr.; Alexander Izquierdo; Rob Kinelski
- Producers: Darhyl "Hey DJ" Camper; Rob Kinelski

Big Sean singles chronology
"Right There" (2013)	"Fire" (2013)	"Sorry" (2013)

Music video
- "Fire" on YouTube

"Fire" is a song by American recording artist Big Sean from his second studio album Hall of Fame (2013). It was released on August 20, 2013 by GOOD Music and Def Jam Recordings as the fourth single from the record. It was written and produced by Darhyl Camper Jr. and Rob Kinelski, with additional songwriting provided by Big Sean and Alexander Izquierdo of The Monsters and the Strangerz. "Fire" is a hip hop song that lyrically describes the perseverance to overcome personal difficulties.

"Fire" received generally favorable reviews from music critics, who compared it the catalogs of fellow rappers Kanye West and Jay-Z, and recognized it as a standout track from Hall of Fame. The song peaked at number 19 on the U.S. Billboard Bubbling Under Hot 100 Singles component chart to the Billboard Hot 100, and reached number 46 on the Billboard Hot R&B/Hip-Hop Songs chart. An accompanying music video was premiered through Vevo on August 2, 2013, and featured American recording artist Miley Cyrus; critics primarily focused on the continuation of the increasingly provocative image she established earlier in the year.

== Background and composition ==
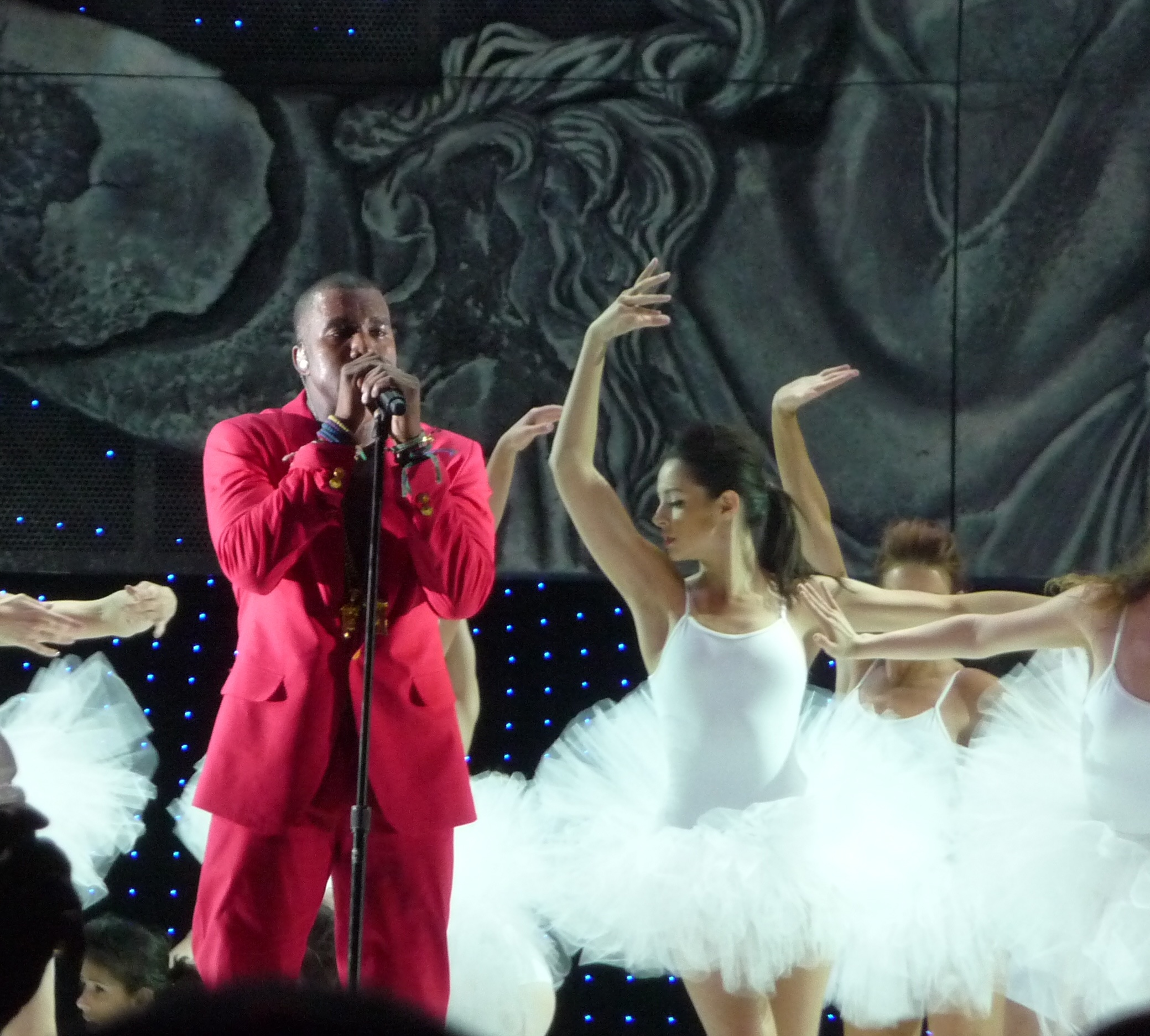
Critics compared "Fire" to the works of Kanye West (pictured), who was also referenced in the lyrics for "Fire".

When Sean was describing his second studio album Hall of Fame (2013) in December 2012, he stated that he wished to "teach and leave a legacy" with its tracks, admitting that the content on his debut record Finally Famous (2011) "didn't really teach too much." "Fire" was officially premiered through SoundCloud on July 29, 2013, after having surfaced online earlier that day. On his Instagram account, Big Sean commented that "this IS NOT a single...yet, but 1 of [his] favorites on the album." The track was released for digital download on August 20 by GOOD Music and Def Jam Recordings. Its release preceded the launch of Hall of Fame, which was made available later that month.

"Fire" is a hip hop song that incorporates a "moody but confident bass line [and] celebratory piano keys". It was compared to the musical styles seen on Graduation (2007), the third studio album by Kanye West, and Watch the Throne (2011), a collaborative record between West and Jay-Z. Lyrically, it has been described to "place emphasis on pushing through personal struggles", and has also been noted for "[lifting] a few cues from heroes such as mentor Kanye West and Jay-Z". Big Sean performed "Fire" on The Arsenio Hall Show, which had recently been revived after a nearly twenty-year hiatus, on September 19, 2013.

== Critical reception ==
Upon its release, "Fire" received generally favorable reviews from music critics. Writing for Entertainment Weekly, spoke favorably of the track, calling it the "centerpiece of Fame, an infectious antidote to his famous mentor [Kanye West]'s self-seriousness." While recognizing musical similarities to Graduation and Watch the Throne, Gary Graff from The Oakland Press felt that Big Sean drew inspiration from West and Jay-Z's records while maintaining "his own stylized favor and flow". Khari of The Source felt that "Fire" was appropriately placed as the second song on Hall of Fame, where it matched the "flawless effort" seen in the opening track "Nothing Is Stopping You". David Jeffries of AllMusic and Edna Gundersen from USA Today both considered the track to be a standout from the record, and both placed it on their lists of recommended purchases from the album.

== Chart performance ==
"Fire" peaked at number 19 on the US Billboard Bubbling Under Hot 100 Singles component chart to the Billboard Hot 100, which represents the twenty-five songs that failed to reach the flagship Billboard Hot 100. It also reached number 46 on the Billboard Hot R&B/Hip-Hop Songs chart.

== Music video ==
"I wanted somebody who was beautiful and I wanted to take her out of her element. People looking at her like she's twerking and all this stuff, but she's an awesome person, man. She symbolizes the beauty of a lot of women overcoming different relationships and being as beautiful as a flower."

— Big Sean discussing the reasoning behind featuring Cyrus in the music video for "Fire".

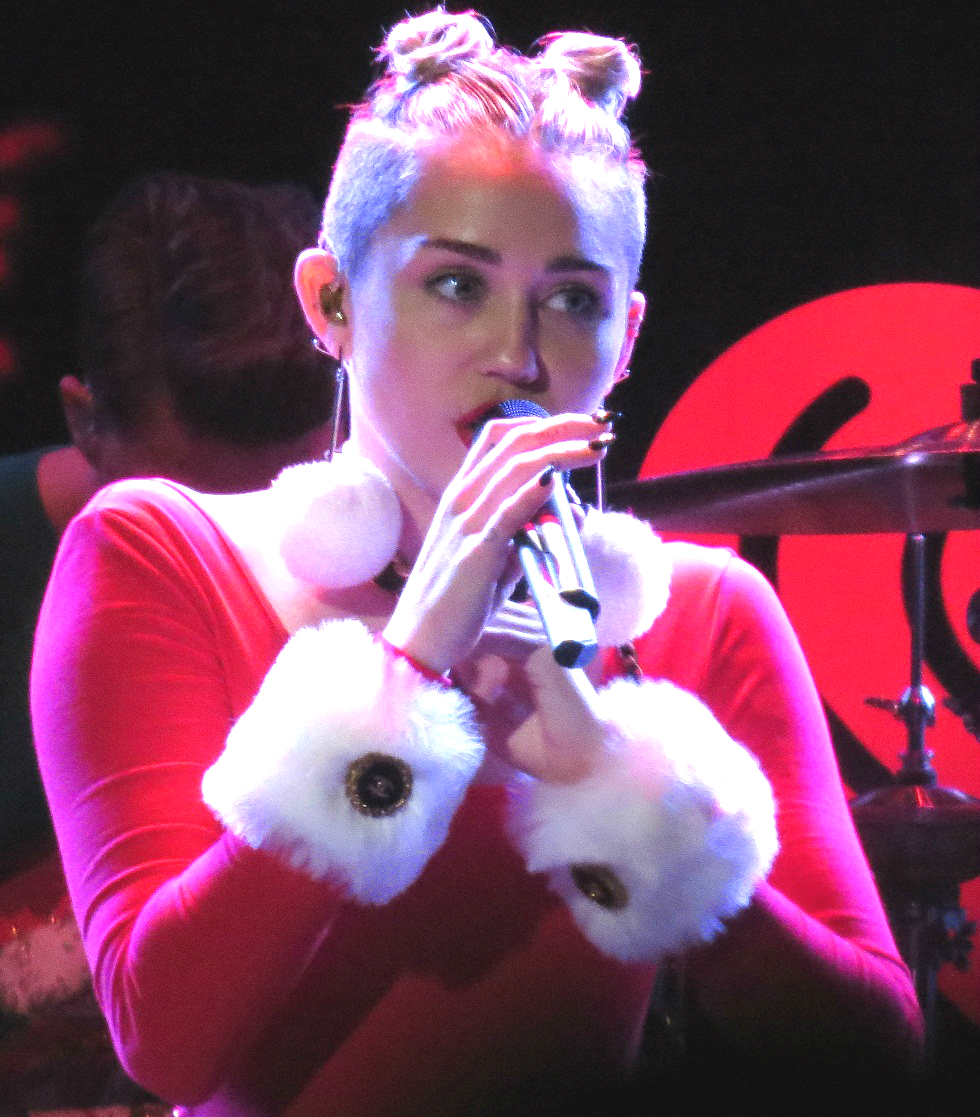
Critical commentary was directed towards Cyrus' (pictured) increasingly provocative image.

An accompanying music video for "Fire" was directed by Jack Heller and Matthew Williams; it premiered through Vevo on August 2, 2013. The clip features American recording artist Miley Cyrus; according to Emily Blake and Nadeska Alexis of MTV News, it is composed entirely of "seductive stances and sultry glares [which] are interrupted solely by images of a red rose and a burning picture of the MC [Big Sean] himself". Big Sean commented that the lyrics delivered in the track "really [don't] have anything to do with her personal story in the video."

Critical commentary regarding the music video focused on Cyrus' increasingly provocative image. Margaret Eby of Daily News stated that she "just can't stop strutting her stuff" and "[flaunted] several barely-there outfits in the three-minute video." A writer for The Huffington Post shared a similar sentiment, adding that "even though her wardrobe is full of crop tops and itty bitty shorts, Miley Cyrus' skimpy outfits still manage to shock." A writer for Rap-Up provided a favorable review, complimenting Cyrus for "[turning] up the heat" in the "striking visuals". Writing for VH1, Emily Exton joked that "hip-hop's fledgling relationship with a former Disney star just got a little stronger", and noted that "Jay-Z may have encouraged Miley’s love of twerking with his "Somewhereinamerica" shout-out, but it appears Sean is less interested in seeing Billy Ray's daughter shake her thing than having her walk around in dazzling heels and stare the camera down in the name of art."

== Credits and personnel ==
Credits adapted from the liner notes of Hall of Fame.

- Big Sean – lead vocals, songwriting
- Elijah Blake – background vocals
- Darhyl "Hey DJ" Camper – songwriting, production
- James Fauntleroy – background vocals
- Melanie Fiona – background vocals
- Alexander Izquierdo – songwriting
- Rob Kinelski – songwriting, production
- Nicole Lequerica – background vocals

== Charts ==
Chart (2013)	Peak position
US Bubbling Under Hot 100 (Billboard)	19
US Hot R&B/Hip-Hop Songs (Billboard)	46

== Release history ==
Country	Date	Format	Label	Ref.
United States	August 20, 2013	Digital download	GOOD; Def Jam	
United Kingdom	August 29, 2013	Urban contemporary radio	GOOD; Def Jam	
