= Hall of Fame (Big Sean album) =

Studio album by Big Sean
- Released: August 27, 2013
- Studios: 4220 Feng Shui (Los Angeles); Island Sound (Honolulu)
- Genre: Hip-hop
- Length: 61:10
- Labels: GOOD; Def Jam
- Producers: Da Internz; Hey DJ; James Poyser; Key Wane; Mano; Mike Dean; No I.D.; Xaphoon Jones; Young Chop

Big Sean chronology
Detroit (2012)	Hall of Fame (2013)	Dark Sky Paradise (2015)

Deluxe edition cover

Singles from Hall of Fame
- 1. "Guap" Released: October 26, 2012; 2. "Switch Up" Released: April 6, 2013; 3. "Beware" Released: June 25, 2013; 4. "Fire" Released: August 20, 2013; 5. "Ashley" Released: October 2013

Hall of Fame is the second studio album by American rapper Big Sean. It was released on August 27, 2013, by GOOD Music and Def Jam Recordings. The album features guest appearances from Nas, Jhené Aiko, Nicki Minaj, Kid Cudi, Lil Wayne, Jeezy, Meek Mill, 2 Chainz and Juicy J, while the production on the album was primarily handled by Key Wane, Hey DJ, No I.D., Da Internz, Mano and Young Chop, among others. It was supported by five singles: "Guap", "Switch Up", "Beware", "Fire" and "Ashley".

Hall of Fame received generally positive reviews from critics. The album debuted at number three on the US Billboard 200, selling 72,000 copies in its first week. As of February 2015, the album has sold 155,000 copies in the United States.

== Background ==
On September 27, 2012, Big Sean announced the title of his second studio album would be Hall of Fame: Memoirs of a Detroit Player, and announced a release date of December 2012. Sean stated that he chose the title because it represents himself. He also said that he feels "like situations are really going to be relatable to people." Shortly afterwards, he stated that he "didn't want to just do another club song", and that he did not want to follow the popular music standards. "This is just what the fuck I want to do. Some people are going to like it. Some people are going to hate it; regardless, I'm just doing me." Sean also said that Hall of Fame would be a far more inspirational and a more conceptually-driven project than his debut album. He went on to say he wanted to teach and make a lasting impact on peoples' lives with this album. Soon after, in an interview with Power 105, Sean stated he would include skits on the album to give it a "classic feel". Also indicating that the song "Mula", which features French Montana from the mixtape Detroit, could be featured as a deluxe edition track.

Sean also said that the album would feature all types of songs, and everyone that had heard the album at that point in December 2012, had been "blown away" by it, including Kanye West, No I.D. and J. Cole. The single "Clique" from GOOD Music's album Cruel Summer, was originally supposed to be featured on Hall of Fame. Starting the year, the album was included on multiple "Most Anticipated Albums of 2013" lists, including those by MTV, magazine XXL, who ranked it fourth, and Complex, which placed it eleventh.

== Recording and production ==
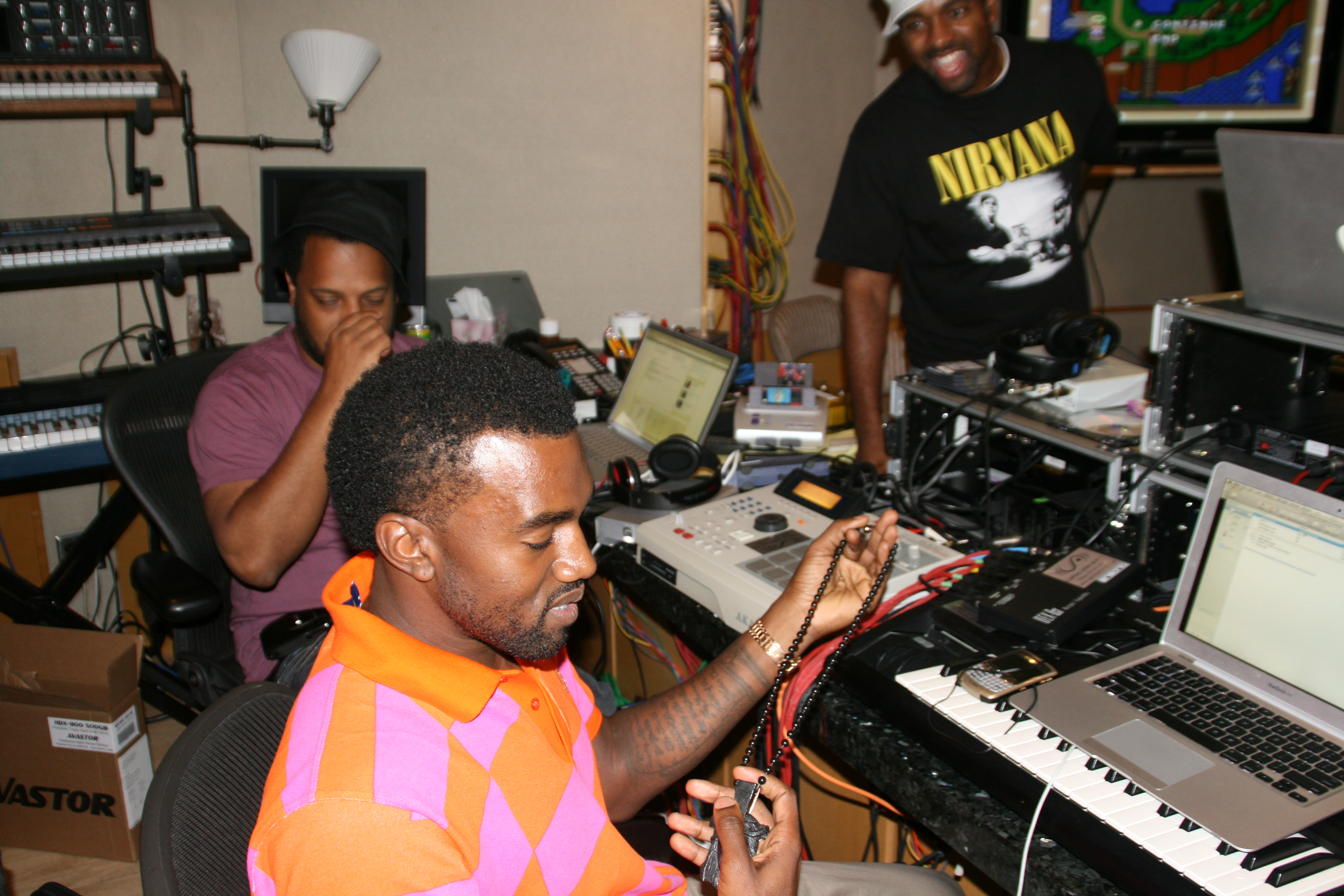
No I.D. (left) was the album's primary record producer and Kanye West (front) was the album's executive producer.

Early in the album's recording process, Sean revealed that Kanye West, Nas, Tyga, Common and Jhené Aiko were going to make appearances as featured artists, while West, No I.D., Key Wane, Hit-Boy and Young Chop will provide production on the album. He would later confirm guest appearances from Miguel, Kid Cudi and other members of GOOD Music. In an interview with Tim Westwood on November 28, 2012, he revealed that Eminem had invited him to come to the studio, along with announcing that he had renamed the album from Hall of Fame: Memoirs of a Detroit Player to just Hall of Fame. On March 12, 2013, along with revealing a slew of songs on the album, Big Sean stated there would be songs featuring Lil Wayne, Juicy J and 2 Chainz on the album. He also revealed that he worked with DJ Camper, DJ Mano, Da Internz and Rio on the album production wise.

Sean finally had a studio session with Eminem on April 26, 2013, that also included Royce da 5'9" and Mr. Porter. On June 8, 2013, Big Sean spoke with MTV News about his almost full day studio session with Eminem, promising a potential final product and labeling it a "Detroit classic", but was not sure whether it will appear on Hall of Fame or on Eminem's upcoming eighth studio album. However, he would explain that Eminem was too busy working on his album to get on Hall of Fame.

During July 2013, Sean revealed that Ellie Goulding would be featured on the album. During a listening session the following month, he revealed additional guest appearances on the album would come from Nicki Minaj, Jeezy and Doughboyz Cashout. In August 2013, Big Sean told Rolling Stone that the album was primarily produced by No I.D. and Sean's childhood friend Key Wane, with Kanye West having a much smaller presence on the album then Sean's debut album. The final track listing contained guest appearances from Ellie Goulding, Lil Wayne, Jhené Aiko, Nas, Kid Cudi, Nicki Minaj, Juicy J, Jeezy, Payroll of Doughboyz Cashout, James Fauntleroy, Miguel, 2 Chainz, Meek Mill, Earlly Mac, Pharrell Williams and Common.

== Release and promotion ==
To garner anticipation for the album, Big Sean released the mixtape Detroit on September 5, 2012. The mixtape was composed of previously unreleased songs. It featured guest appearances from fellow rappers J. Cole, Juicy J, King Chip, French Montana, Royce da 5'9", Kendrick Lamar, Tyga, Chris Brown, Wale and Wiz Khalifa, along with track narrations by Common, Jeezy and Snoop Dogg. Production was provided by Hit-Boy, Da Internz, Lex Luger and Key Wane.

In the months before the album's release, Big Sean has gone on to release a handful of inspirational video blogs that touch on how he's gotten to where he's at in his career and what he plans on doing to further his position in music. His vlogs have featured cameos from Kanye West, 2 Chainz, Pusha T, Common, No I.D., Rita Ora, Trey Songz, Wale, Wiz Khalifa, Lupe Fiasco, Teyana Taylor and T-Pain, among others. Starting on February 23, 2013, Sean began a European tour in promotion of the album that continued until March 13 of the same year. On September 28, 2013, Sean released a 23-minute documentary covering the development and making of the album, which begun 269 days before the project's release.

After initially announcing a December 18, 2012, release date for the album, it was revealed that the album would be pushed back to February 2013, because it was not ready yet. However, the album's release date was yet again delayed. At the beginning of February, Sean stated that the album was almost finished, and that the second single would be released that month. He revealed an expected release date of June 2013. Then on June 22, he released a video on YouTube where he previewed one of the songs, "Nothing Is Stopping You", and announced a final release date of August 27, 2013, for the album. A little over a month later, Sean revealed the standard and deluxe edition album covers via his Instagram.

Sean originally intended to include "Control" on the album, a track produced by No I.D. and featuring guest vocals from Kendrick Lamar and Jay Electronica. However, he could not include it on the album due to sample clearing issues. So on August 14, 2013, the song was sent to mainstream urban radio as one of the album's promotional singles. Lamar's verse caused controversy as he "called out" J. Cole, Big K.R.I.T., Wale, Pusha T, Meek Mill, ASAP Rocky, Drake, Sean, Jay Electronica, Tyler, the Creator, and Mac Miller and referred to himself as the "King of New York". Many rappers were offended by the lyrics, even though they were not explicitly mentioned. Rappers including Lupe Fiasco, Papoose, Joell Ortiz, Cassidy, Joe Budden, ASAP Ferg, King Los, The Mad Rapper, Uncle Murda and B.o.B, among many others released response or diss songs within the following week. The song peaked at number 43 on the US Hot R&B/Hip-Hop Songs.

== Singles ==
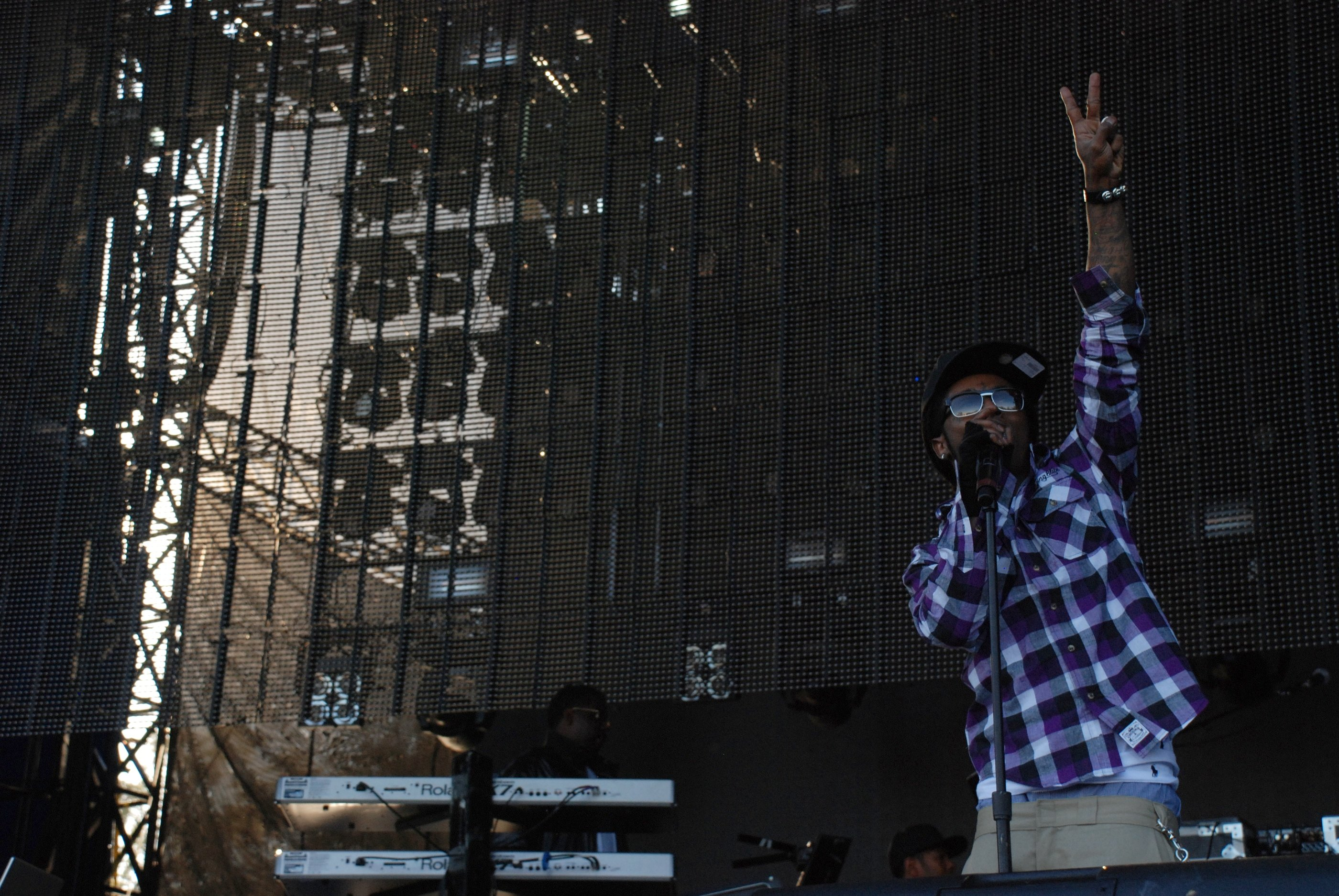
Rapper Lil Wayne made a guest appearance on the album's third single "Beware".

On October 6, 2012, in an interview discussing the album, Sean revealed that the first single would be released within the next ten days. He later added that the song "ain't no turn-up song. I wanted to do something a little bit different. I wanted to do some shit that I really was inspired by, something that strikes an emotional chord in people." Later that day, he tweeted that he decided to hold back on the emotional songs for a bit and would release the single "Guap" instead. It was then released on October 26, 2012. The song was produced by Key Wane and Young Chop. The song peaked at number 71 on the US Billboard Hot 100.

The second single, "Switch Up", was announced along with its artwork by Big Sean on April 5, 2013, and shortly after the audio was premiered. The single featured fellow rapper Common, while the production was handled by Mano and No I.D. The song was released for digital download the following day. The song peaked at number 50 on the US Hot R&B/Hip-Hop Songs.

The album's lead single, "Beware", featuring rapper Lil Wayne and singer Jhené Aiko became digitally available on June 25, 2013. On August 16, 2013, the music video was released for "Beware". The song peaked at number 38 on the Billboard Hot 100. A low quality version of the song "Fire" leaked online on July 29, 2013, which resulted in Big Sean releasing the full version later that day. Then four days later, the music video starring singer Miley Cyrus was released for the song. "Fire" was released on August 20, 2013, as the album's fourth single.

"Ashley", which features R&B singer Miguel, impacted urban contemporary radio in October 2013 as the album's fifth overall single, becoming the most-added song to urban radio on the Nielsen BDS chart in the week following its release. On January 31, 2014, Big Sean released the music video for "Ashley". Luke Tedaldi of XXL described the video as dark, intense and "undeniably dope". On August 30, 2013, the music video was released for "10 2 10".

== Critical reception ==
Hall of Fame ratings
Aggregate scores
Source	Rating
Metacritic	72/100
Review scores
Source	Rating
AllMusic	3.5/5 stars
The A.V. Club	B−
Entertainment Weekly	A−
Exclaim!	7/10
The Oakland Press	3/4 stars
Rolling Stone	3/5 stars
The Source	4/5
Spin	7/10
USA Today	3/4 stars
XXL	4/5

Hall of Fame was met with generally positive reviews. At Metacritic, which assigns a normalized rating out of 100 to reviews from professional publications, the album received an average score of 72, based on 14 reviews.

Kyle Anderson of Entertainment Weekly positively compared the album to the late 1990s releases by Bad Boy and said that Big Sean easily outshines all the featured artists on the album. At USA Today, Edna Gunderson called this, an "outstanding second album" that he "occasionally stumbles" in an effort that is a "smart set of slick club thumpers, tear-jerkers and introspective yarns." Jon Dolan of Rolling Stone commented saying, "The Detroit MC gets over on congeniality and crisp delivery, even when his lyrics are pro forma." He also praised the album's production. At The Oakland Press, Gary Graff noted that "Hall of Fame is still a solid, confident and diverse set that shows how much he's grown as both an MC and a writer since 'Finally Famous' came out in 2011." Andrea Aguilar of HipHopDX summarized the album stating, "As a whole, the feel-good album's set of eclectic beats doesn't disappoint, but it lacks diversity. Most of Sean's content still teems with predictable material risking leaving listeners disinterested. Random skits also slightly interrupt the flow of the album, but if you're looking for motivational music centered on the money, the cars, the clothes and hoes, this album is sure to get plenty of replays on your iPod and local radio stations alike."

Evan Rytlewski of The A.V. Club said, "Hall of Fame doubles down on the carefree spirit of its predecessor. The mood is so consistently upbeat and agreeable that nearly everything works, especially the tracks that pair Sean with a strong singer." Eric Diep of XXL commented that, "Hall of Fame moves along at a steady pace for the most part," but there are instances where the album is less than consistent. Concluding that, "even these minor shortcomings don't supersede the fact that the album is filled with radio-friendly cuts and compelling storytelling." David Jeffries of AllMusic said, while Hall of Fame provides plenty of vibrant, sexual, exciting moments, the "classic feel" that was intended is "nowhere to be found." Erin Lowers of Exclaim! commented that, "While Hall of Fame escapes the dreaded sophomore curse, it doesn't do so unscathed. [...] Big Sean may not have solidified his position in the rap hall of fame, but is certainly in the process of paving his way." David Turner of Spin said, "Kanye's My Beautiful Dark Twisted Fantasy is an immediate parallel to this album of relationship struggle and soul-searching, and while Sean obviously lacks his mentor's star power or ambition, he shows more heart than he typically gets credit for." Jesal Padania of RapReviews called the individual tracks distinct, big and bold, while the album remains consistent. However, said that the album lacks any classic material.

=== Rankings ===
The album was ranked at number 16 on XXL's list of the best albums of 2013. Complex placed the album at number 50 on their list of the best albums of 2013, saying that "It's fitting that he and Kendrick had that moment on "Control," because Hall of Fame clearly owes some sort of debt to Good Kid, M.A.A.D City. K-Dot opened up a space for rap to do that, or at least reminded folks of the sorts of things Pete Rock & CL Smooth used to do with the art form. Before hearing Hall of Fame, the title sounded pretentious. After hearing it, it's clear that Sean is ready to earn his place."

== Commercial performance ==
Hall of Fame debuted at number three on the US Billboard 200, selling 72,000 copies in its first week. This became Sean's second US top-ten debut. That was also a 17% decline in sales from his debut studio album Finally Famous, which also debuted at number three on the chart and sold 87,000 copies in its first week. David Drake of Complex named the album an example of a sophomore slump. In its second week, the album dropped to number 24 on the chart, selling an additional 18,000 copies. As of February 2015, the album has sold 155,000 copies in the US, according to Nielsen SoundScan. On October 25, 2017, the album was certified gold by the Recording Industry Association of America (RIAA), for combined sales and album-equivalent units over 500,000 units in the United States.

The album also charted internationally, peaking at number 56 on the UK Albums Chart and number 10 on the Canadian Albums Chart.

== Track listing ==
Credits adapted from the album's liner notes.

Hall of Fame standard edition
No.	Title	Writer(s)	Producer(s)	Length
1.	"Nothing Is Stopping You"	Sean Anderson; Dwane Weir II; Alexander Izquierdo; Pharrell Williams	Key Wane	5:03
2.	"Fire"	Anderson; Darhyl Camper Jr.; Izquierdo; Rob Kinelski	Hey DJ; Kinelski^{[b]}; Anderson^{[b]}	4:22
3.	"10 2 10"	Anderson; Dion Wilson; Weir; Jacques Webster	No I.D.; Key Wane^{[b]}; Travis Scott^{[b]}	3:22
4.	"Toyota Music"	Anderson; Noah Beresin	Xaphoon Jones	3:23
5.	"You Don't Know"	Anderson; Wilson; Adam Glassco; Ellie Goulding	No I.D.	3:42
6.	"Beware" (featuring Lil Wayne and Jhené Aiko)	Anderson; Weir; Mike Dean; Dwayne Carter Jr.; Izquierdo; Jhené Chilombo; Dennis Lambert; Brian Potter	Key Wane; Dean	3:54
7.	"First Chain" (featuring Nas and Kid Cudi)	Anderson; Wilson; Nasir Jones; Scott Mescudi	No I.D.; Key Wane	5:29
8.	"Mona Lisa"	Anderson; Marcos Palacios; Ernest Clark; Izquierdo	Da Internz; The Twilite Tone^{[b]}	3:30
9.	"Freaky"	Rudy Moore		0:42
10.	"Milf" (featuring Nicki Minaj and Juicy J)	Anderson; Clark; Palacios; Izquierdo; Onika Maraj; Jordan Houston; Moore	Da Internz; The Twilite Tone^{[b]}	4:23
11.	"Sierra Leone"	Anderson; Wilson; James Poyser; Redd Evans; Neal Hefti; Jay Livingston; Nicole Lequerica	No I.D.; Poyser^{[a]}	4:44
12.	"It's Time" (featuring Jeezy and Payroll)	Anderson; Weir; Jay Jenkins; Damon Petty	Key Wane	4:41
13.	"World Ablaze" (featuring James Fauntleroy)	Anderson; Weir; Wilson; James Fauntleroy II	Key Wane; No I.D.^{[b]}	4:48
14.	"Ashley" (featuring Miguel)	Anderson; Emmanuel Nickerson; Wilson; Miguel Pimentel	Mano; No I.D.^{[b]}	4:22
15.	"All Figured Out"	Anderson; Wilson	No I.D.	4:44
Total length:				61:10

Deluxe edition (bonus tracks)
No.	Title	Writer(s)	Producer(s)	Length
16.	"Mula" (remix; featuring 2 Chainz, Meek Mill and Earlly Mac)	Anderson; Tyree Pittman; Izquierdo; Tauheed Epps; Robert Williams	Young Chop	5:54
17.	"Switch Up" (featuring Common)	Anderson; Nickerson; Wilson; Lonnie Lynn Jr.	Mano; No I.D.; Kinelski^{[b]}	5:08
18.	"Guap"	Anderson; Weir; Pittman; Izquierdo; Weir; Camper; Kanye West; Andrea Martin; Kinelski; Noah Goldstein	Key Wane; Young Chop; Hey DJ^{[b]}; Kinelski^{[b]}; Goldstein^{[b]}	4:31
Total length:				76:43

Notes

- ^{^[a]} signifies a co-producer
- ^{^[b]} signifies an additional producer
- "Nothing Is Stopping You" features additional vocals by James Fauntleroy, Kanye West, Zeno Jones, Myra Anderson and DJ Mo Beatz
- "Fire" contains additional vocals by Melanie Fiona, Nicole Lequericam, James Fauntleroy and Elijah Blake
- "You Don't Know" features additional vocals from Elijah Blake
- "First Chain" features additional vocals from Kaye Fox and Nicole Lequerica
- "Milf" features additional vocals from Niko Clark, Terron Clark and Quron Hudson
- "Sierra Leone" features additional vocals from Roscoe Dash, Key Wane, Mike Posner and James Fauntleroy
- "It's Time" features additional vocals from Key Wane and Roscoe Dash
- "World Ablaze" features additional vocals from James Fauntleroy and Elijah Blake
- "All Figured Out" features additional vocals by James Fauntleroy
- "Guap" features additional vocals from Kanye West and Key Wane and Andrea Martin

Sample credits

- "Nothing Is Stopping You" contains a sample of "Rocket's Theme", performed by Pharrell Williams.
- "You Don't Know" contains a sample of "You Don't Know", performed by Flinch featuring Ellie Goulding.
- "Beware" contains an interpolation of "Ain't No Woman (Like the One I've Got)", written by Dennis Lambert and Brian Potter, and performed by the Four Tops.
- "Freaky" and "Milf" contains a sample of "The Sensuous Black Woman Meets the Sensuous Black Man", written by Rudy Ray Moore, and performed by Rudy Ray Moore and Lady Reed.
- "Sierra Leone" contains a sample of "Lonely Girl", written by Redd Evans, Neal Hefti and Jay Livingston, and performed by Dorothy Ashby.

== Personnel ==
Album credits adapted from AllMusic.

- Jhené Aiko – featured artist
- Myra Anderson – vocals
- Sean Anderson – primary artist, executive producer
- Big Sean – primary artist
- Elijah Blake – vocals
- Darhyl "DJ" Camper Jr. – producer
- Mike Carson – graphic design
- Ariel Chobaz – vocal engineer
- Niko Clark – vocals
- Terron Clark – vocals
- Crazy Mike – engineer
- Da Internz – producer
- Roscoe Dash – vocals
- Mike Dean – producer
- DJ Mo Beatz – vocals
- James Fauntleroy – featured artist, vocals
- Melanie Fiona – vocals
- Kaye Fox – vocals
- Quron Hudson – vocals
- Maximilian Jaeger – assistant engineer, mixing assistant
- Young Jeezy – featured artist
- Xaphoon Jones – producer
- Zeno Jones – vocals
- Juicy J – featured artist
- Kacper Kasprzyk – photography
- Kid Cudi – featured artist
- Rob Kinelski – additional production, engineer, mixing
- Dave Kutch – mastering
- Nicole Lequerica – vocals
- Lil Wayne – featured artist
- Tai Linzie – artwork, package production
- Million $ Mano – producer
- Miguel – featured artist
- Mikewaxx – graphic design
- Nicki Minaj – featured artist
- Nas – featured artist
- No I.D. – additional production, producer
- Payroll – featured artist
- Mike Posner – vocals
- James Poyser – keyboards, musician, producer
- Andy Proctor – package production
- Kevin Randolph – keyboards
- Antonio Rey – engineer
- Travi$ Scott – additional production
- Derek Taylor – drums, percussion
- Twilite Tone – additional production
- Anna Ugarte – assistant engineer, mixing assistant
- Key Wane – additional production, musician, producer, vocals
- Dawud West – artwork, package production
- Kanye West – executive producer, vocals
- Matthew Williams – art direction
- Steve Wyreman – bass, guitar
- Kristen Yiengst – artwork, package production

== Charts ==
=== Weekly charts ===
Chart performance for Hall of Fame
Chart (2013)	Peak position
Belgian Albums (Ultratop Flanders)	149
Canadian Albums (Billboard)	10
UK Albums (Official Charts)	56
UK R&B Albums (Official Charts)	5
US Billboard 200	3
US Top R&B/Hip-Hop Albums (Billboard)	1

=== Year-end charts ===
2013 year-end chart performance for Hall of Fame
Chart (2013)	Position
US Top R&B/Hip-Hop Albums (Billboard)	47

== Certifications ==
Certifications and sales for Hall of Fame
Region	Certification	Certified units/sales
United States (RIAA)	Gold	500,000^{‡}
^{‡} Sales+streaming figures based on certification alone.

== Release history ==
Release dates and formats for Hall of Fame
Region	Date	Label(s)	Format(s)	Ref.
Australia	August 26, 2013	GOOD; Def Jam	CD; digital download	
New Zealand	August 26, 2013	GOOD; Def Jam	CD; digital download	
France	August 26, 2013	GOOD; Def Jam	CD; digital download	
Canada	August 27, 2013	GOOD; Def Jam	CD; digital download	
United Kingdom	August 27, 2013	Virgin EMI	CD; digital download	
United States	August 27, 2013	GOOD; Def Jam	CD; LP; digital download	
Germany	August 30, 2013	Def Jam (Universal)	CD; digital download	
