= So Good (Big Sean and Metro Boomin song) =

Song by Big Sean and Metro Boomin featuring Kash Doll

Single by Big Sean and Metro Boomin featuring Kash Doll

from the album Double or Nothing
- Released: February 13, 2018
- Recorded: 2017
- Genre: Dirty rap
- Length: 4:28
- Label: GOOD; Def Jam; Republic; Universal; Boominati
- Songwriters: Sean Anderson; Leland Wayne; Arkeisha Knight

Big Sean singles chronology
"Pull Up N Wreck" (2017)	"So Good" (2018)	"Alone (Remix)" (2018)

Metro Boomin singles chronology
"Pull Up N Wreck" (2017)	"So Good" (2018)	"Mile High" (2019)

Kash Doll singles chronology
"Pros (Remix)" (2017)	"So Good" (2018)	"Actin' Funny" (2018)

"So Good" is a song by American rapper Big Sean and American record producer Metro Boomin from their collaborative studio album Double or Nothing (2017). The song features American rapper Kash Doll. It was sent to rhythmic contemporary radio on February 13, 2018, as the second single from the album.

== Critical reception ==
The song received generally positive reviews from critics and remained of the most popular song on the album. Writing for AllMusic, Neil Z. Yeung considered it a highlight of Double or Nothing and called it "absolutely filthy". Trent Clark of HipHopDX regarded it as the album's most "engaging" track, describing it as "a raunchy parking lot party-starter where Detroit-bred starlet Kash Doll breezes past Sean with a well-manicured appearance, after he shits the bed with the line 'Pussy so good, I never fuck you in the ass.'" Vince Rick of HotNewHipHop gave a favorable review of the song, writing, "'So Good' is the album's standout track. Metro creates the kind of beat you want to lean into and sway, and Big Sean's lyricism is unforgivable (in the best possible way). This track also features, Kash Doll, who drops a sharp, clever rejoinder to Big Sean's alpha-male stuntin' (perhaps the best guest verse on the album)." Conversely, Claire Lobenfeld criticized the song in her review of Double or Nothing, writing: "His feeble attempts at political commentary are, however, less unfortunate than his characteristically gross sex raps of which there are plenty. The most vacuous are on 'So Good'"; regarding the lyrics "I be damned if I didn't 69 / I can hit this shit until I'm 69", Lobenfeld wrote, "It is, at least, a good reminder that no matter how ironic your "nice" joke is, there has probably never been an actually funny 69 joke ever in history."

Singer Billie Eilish is a fan of the song.

== Charts ==
Chart (2017–18)	Peak position
US Bubbling Under Hot 100 (Billboard)	13
US Rhythmic Airplay (Billboard)	36

== Certifications ==
Region	Certification	Certified units/sales
United States (RIAA)	Platinum	1,000,000^{‡}
^{‡} Sales+streaming figures based on certification alone.
