= Switch Up (Big Sean song) =

2013 single by Big Sean

Single by Big Sean featuring Common

from the album Hall of Fame
- Released: April 6, 2013
- Recorded: 2012
- Genre: Hip hop
- Length: 5:10
- Label: GOOD; Def Jam
- Songwriters: Sean Anderson; Lonnie Lynn Jr.; Emmanuel Nickerson; Ernest Wilson; Rob Kinelski
- Producers: Mano; No I.D.; Rob Kinelski (add.)

Big Sean singles chronology
"All That (Lady)" (2013)	"Switch Up" (2013)	"Wild" (2013)

Common singles chronology
"Favorite Song" (2012)	"Switch Up" (2013)	"Kingdom" (2014)

"Switch Up" is a song by American hip hop recording artist Big Sean. It was released on April 6, 2013, as the second single from his second studio album Hall of Fame (2013). The song, produced by Mano and No I.D., features a guest appearance from fellow rapper Common. The song had little success, peaking at number 50 on the US Billboard Hot R&B/Hip-Hop Songs.

== Background ==
The second single, "Switch Up", was announced along with its artwork by Big Sean on April 5, 2013 via Twitter, and shortly after was premiered on his official website. The single features fellow rapper Common, while the production was handled by No I.D. & Rob Kinelski. The song was then released for digital download the following day.

=== Theme ===
Big Sean made a statement saying how the song is for 'the fans of real rap and his believers'. In an interview he made, "When I put it out, I did it for the believers and the people that's been rocking with me, fans of just real rap."

== Controversy ==
"Switch Up" came to controversy after fans were asking Big Sean on Twitter if the song was a diss to Kid Cudi. Kid Cudi left the GOOD Music label just four days before Big Sean released "Switch Up". The lyrics rapped in the chorus "Who gon' leave you there when who gon' leave which ya?/ This is for the ones thats always ridin' with ya/ Ain't switch, I ain't switch up/ Naw, naw I aint switch up/ The same me, naw naw I ain't switch up/ The same team, naw naw I ain't switch up..." made fans think that Big Sean was angry towards Kid Cudi's departure from GOOD Music. Big Sean clarified the controversy with an interview with MTV News. Big Sean said in the interview that he was still friends with Kid Cudi as he stated "Motherfucker that's the dumbest shit somebody could ever say. That's my fam. When I lost my Jesus piece Cudi gave me his Jesus piece. That's my brother."

== Track listing ==
Digital single

No.	Title	Writer(s)	Producer(s)	Length
1.	"Switch Up" (featuring Common)	Sean Anderson, Lonnie Lynn Jr., Ernest Wilson, Rob Kinelski	Mano, No I.D.	5:10

== Charts ==
Chart (2013)	Peak position
US Billboard Hot R&B/Hip-Hop Songs	50

== Release history ==
Country	Date	Format	Label
United States	April 6, 2013	Digital download	GOOD, Def Jam
