= John West (singer) =

American singer (born 1983)

- Born: May 11, 1983 (age 42); Baton Rouge, Louisiana, U.S.
- Origin: Chicago, Illinois, U.S.
- Genres: Pop; R&B; blue-eyed soul
- Occupations: Singer; songwriter; rapper; educator; street performer
- Years active: 2004–present
- Labels: Def Jam; Mercury; Island
- Website: soundcloud.com/johnwestla

John West (born May 11, 1983) is an American singer, formerly signed to Def Jam Recordings.

== Biography ==
John West was born on May 11, 1983, in Baton Rouge, Louisiana. West discovered his talent for music while in high school, where he took classical guitar lessons for a year. His musical influences stem from listening to such artists such as Erykah Badu, Lauryn Hill, Carole King, Jill Scott and Lenny Kravitz. After graduating in 2000, he headed to Los Angeles for college and the pursuit of a bigger passion: cartooning. West later transferred to Columbia College in Chicago as an English and art major. Upon graduating college, West moved to Los Angeles to concentrate on music.

While recording music, West also worked as a substitute teacher. He began to perform on Third Street Promenade. After a couple of years word spread of West, and after being invited to New York City to showcase his musical talents with an acoustic performance for Mercury Records President, David Massey, West signed with Mercury/Island Def Jam in October 2010.

In 2011, West released his self-titled debut EP John West which includes his first single "Lovely", produced by Christian Rich, it features American rapper Pusha T. On September 1, 2011, West released the Mark Staubach-directed music video and on September 15, 2011, he released the video for "Loved You Tonight". John West premiered and released the cover art for his single "Already There" featuring Big Sean on November 10, 2011, the music video was released on VEVO four days later. Since being signed, West has worked with Brian Kennedy, The Smeezingtons, Kevin Rudolf, and the Stereotypes, among others.

West has been recognized by the LA Times and featured in USA Today as a 'pick of the week'.

== Discography ==
=== Extended plays ===
List of albums
Title	Album details
John West	Release date: August 2, 2011; Label: Mercury, Def Jam; Format: CD, digital download; Copyright: (C) 2011 The Island Def Jam Music Group; Total Length: 11:16; Tracks; 01. "Lovely" (featuring Pusha T); 02. "Right Now"; 03. "Loved You Tonight"

Title	Album details
John West	Release date: 2006; Label: -; Format: CD, digital download; Copyright: -; Total Length: -; Tracks; 01. "Gravity"; 02. "Loved You Tonight"; 03. "Masquerade"; 04 "Butterflies"; 05 "Hope It All Works Out"; 06 "Thought I Was"; 07 "Change If I Can"; 08 "40 Days"; 09 " Saints N Sinners"; 10 "Like A Lady"; 11 "Katrina"; 12 "New Year's Day"; 13 "Gravity (Acoustic)"

== Music videos ==
Title	Year	Director(s)
"Lovely" (featuring Pusha T)	2011	Mark Staubach
"Loved You Tonight"	2011	TBD
"Already There" (featuring Big Sean)	2011	Joseph Garner
"Nobody"	2012	TBD
