= Deep Reverence =

2020 single by Big Sean featuring Nipsey Hussle

Single by Big Sean featuring Nipsey Hussle

from the album Detroit 2
- Released: August 25, 2020
- Length: 3:51
- Label: GOOD; Def Jam
- Songwriters: Sean Anderson; Ermias Asghedom; Chauncey Hollis; Ryan Martinez; Rogét Chahayed; Rafeal Brown; Stephen Feigenbaum
- Producers: Hit-Boy; G. Ry; Chahayed; Audio Anthem; Johan Lenox

Big Sean singles chronology
| "None of Your Concern" (2019) | "Deep Reverence" (2020) | "Wolves" (2020) |

Nipsey Hussle singles chronology
| "Unified" (2019) | "Deep Reverence" (2020) | "Do My Thang" (2020) |

Music video
- "Deep Reverence" on YouTube

"Deep Reverence" is a song by American rapper Big Sean featuring fellow American rapper Nipsey Hussle. It was released on August 25, 2020, as the lead single from Sean's fifth studio album Detroit 2 (2020). Produced by Hit-Boy and G. Ry, the song finds Sean and Nipsey rapping about their pressures and struggles in life, and working hard to earn respect. The song received a nomination for Best Rap Performance at the 63rd Annual Grammy Awards.

== Background ==
The song was previewed in March 2020 by Hit-Boy during his Verzuz battle with Canadian record producer Boi-1da. On August 24, 2020, it was announced by Big Sean while he responded to a fan, and released hours later.

== Composition ==
In the first verse of the song, Nipsey Hussle describes his upbringing in a neighborhood of members of the Crips gang. In the second verse, Big Sean raps about how he ended his feud with Kendrick Lamar after Hussle was murdered: "After what happened to Nipsey I reached out to Kendrick / There wasn't even no real issues there to begin with / Lack of communication and wrong information from people fueled by the ego it's like mixing flames with diesel". Sean also reveals that he suffered a miscarriage with his partner, American singer Jhené Aiko, and addresses dealing with anxiety.

== Music video ==
The official music video for the song was released on March 5, 2021. Directed by Sergio, it features a painting of Nipsey Hussle placed throughout Los Angeles. Sean rides around the city with American rappers Snoop Dogg and Dom Kennedy, and raps on a basketball court and in front of a wall, both of which have large murals of Hussle. Several days after the release of the video, Sean shared some behind-the-scenes clips and images on Instagram.

== Charts ==
| Chart (2020) | Peak position |
|---|---|
| Global 200 (Billboard) | 120 |
| US Billboard Hot 100 | 82 |
| US Hot R&B/Hip-Hop Songs (Billboard) | 31 |

== Certifications ==
| Region | Certification | Certified units/sales |
|---|---|---|
| United States (RIAA) | Gold | 500,000^{‡} |
^{‡} Sales+streaming figures based on certification alone.
