= Go Legend =

2017 song by Big Sean and Metro Boomin featuring Travis Scott

Song by Big Sean and Metro Boomin featuring Travis Scott

from the album Double or Nothing
- Released: December 8, 2017
- Recorded: 2017
- Length: 4:28
- Label: GOOD; Def Jam; Republic; Universal; Boominati
- Songwriter(s): Sean Anderson; Leland Wayne; Jacques Webster II; Gerry Goffin; Michael Masser
- Producer(s): Metro Boomin

"Go Legend" is a song by American rapper Big Sean and American record producer Metro Boomin from their collaborative studio album Double or Nothing (2017). It features American rapper Travis Scott and contains samples from "Theme from Mahogany (Do You Know Where You're Going To)" by Diana Ross.

== Background ==
Big Sean previewed the song during his performance at Lollapalooza in August 2017.

== Critical reception ==
The song received generally negative reviews from music critics. Vince Rick of HotNewHipHop stated in his review of Double or Nothing, "From the opening track, 'Go Legend', Big Sean and Metro Boomin live up to the album's name, staking it all on a sample of Diana Ross's 'Theme From Mahogany (Do You Know Where You're Going To)'. It's the kind of brazen decision that only someone like Sean's big brother Kanye would make, not unlike snatching a crucifix off the altar and proceeding to customize it. But Big Sean isn't afraid of tripping over a classic; if Diana Ross' longing and uncertainty previously yielded fates unknown, Sean has already come to term with his destiny— 'microphone legend, yeah/ Sean a legend'." Claire Lobenfeld of Pitchfork wrote, "Why isn't there anyone in the recording studio telling Big Sean that his lyrics are not good? He opens the album with a track called 'Go Legend' where he declares his brother to be like John Legend." Jordan M. of Sputnikmusic commented "Travis Scott goes some way toward wrecking whatever replayablity 'Go Legend' night [sic] have had."

== Charts ==
Chart (2017)	Peak position
Canada (Canadian Hot 100)	59
US Billboard Hot 100	67
US Hot R&B/Hip-Hop Songs (Billboard)	28
