= Research (song) =

Song by Big Sean featuring Ariana Grande

from the album Dark Sky Paradise (Deluxe Edition)
- Released: May 12, 2015
- Studio: DOE Studios (Los Angeles, CA)
- Genre: Hip hop; R&B
- Length: 3:50
- Label: GOOD; Def Jam
- Songwriters: Sean Anderson; Dacoury Natche; Michael Carson; Ariana Grande; Leland Wayne
- Producers: DJ Dahi; Metro Boomin

"Research" is a song recorded by American rapper Big Sean featuring American singer and then-girlfriend Ariana Grande. It was written by Sean, Grande, Dacoury Natchel, Michael Carson, and Leland Wayne, and was produced by DJ Dahi and Metro Boomin. The track was initially set to be sent to radio as the fourth official single from Dark Sky Paradise, however, it was later revealed that "One Man Can Change the World" would serve in its place instead. The song appeared on the album’s deluxe version.

"Research" received mixed reviews from music critics, who appreciated the production and beat but were ambivalent towards the lyrical content, especially the use of derogatory words for women.

== Composition ==
Lyrically, the song is about Big Sean "rapping about a suspicious lover, as Ariana plays detective."

Sean's verses discuss his girlfriend being distrustful, as he raps, "'These hoes be doing research/I swear she like, 'This piece of hair off in the sink...'” He also adds, “Okay I know you did some research, well shit I did too/I saw you wearin’ Drake’s chain like you were part of his crew/I saw you chillin’ with Meek Mill up at the summer jam oooh/I hope my eyes the one that’s lying to me girl and not you.”

In the chorus, meanwhile, Grande sings, “I still have to hide/Now you're next to me at night/You test me all the time/Say I know what you like, like I did the last time/Do you remember? Do you remember?/Do you remember?/When you had nothing to hide...”

== Critical reception ==
"Research" received mixed reviews from music critics upon the release of Dark Sky Paradise. In a positive response, Shannon Weprin from Hypetrak called the song a "pop-esque duet" and "infectiously catchy." Justin Charity from Complex called "Research" one of the album's pop high-points. Eric Diep from HipHopDX described the track as "pop-rap perfected".

The song also received reviews which were negative towards the lyrical content. John Mychal Feraren of FDRMX gave the song 2.7 stars out of 5 and criticized the use of "derogatory words as metaphor to women", but also added that "he [Sean] makes up for it by not completely objectifying them." He went on to say that "women should not be denoted as bitches," and that "artists should also be careful in addressing the need for feminism in music." Also noting the use of derogatory feminine terms, DJ Pizzo from Medium commented, "he more or less calls her [Grande] a 'hoe' in the hook. 'These hoes being doing research,' he sings while Ariana validates his use of the term by simply appearing on the track." However, he did compliment the production by stating that "the beat is dope."

== Charts ==
Chart (2015)	Peak position
US Bubbling Under Hot R&B/Hip-Hop Singles (Billboard)	3
