= Sacrifices (Big Sean song) =

2017 song by Big Sean featuring Migos

Song by Big Sean featuring Migos

from the album I Decided
- Released: February 3, 2017
- Genre: Hip hop; trap
- Length: 4:47
- Label: GOOD; Def Jam
- Songwriters: Sean Anderson; Leland Wayne; Allen Ritter; Quavious Marshall; Kiari Cephus
- Producers: Metro Boomin; Ritter (co.)

Music video
- "Sacrifices" on YouTube

"Sacrifices" is a song by American rapper Big Sean from his fourth studio album I Decided (2017). It features American hip hop group Migos and was produced by Metro Boomin, with co-production from Allen Ritter.

== Lyrics ==
Lyrically, the song finds Big Sean, Offset and Quavo addressing the sacrifices they have made to become the successful artists they are.

== Critical reception ==
The song was met with generally positive reviews from music critics. Brittany Spanos of Rolling Stone commented that Big Sean is "no match for the affable charm of Migos" in the song. Andy Belt of Consequence praised the Metro Boomin's production of the song, writing that it grounds "some of the rapper's sillier lines". Eric Renner Brown of Entertainment Weekly also wrote favorably of the song's production, stating that it "proves classical harpsichords and Southern trap aren't mutually exclusive." A. Harmony of Exclaim! was more critical of the song, describing it as "fun, but ultimately shallow compared to the album's weighty storyline." Matthew Strauss of Pitchfork considered "Sacrifices" the best song from I Decided.

== Music video ==
The official music video was released on May 19, 2017. Directed by Kid Studio, it sees Big Sean speeding on a motorcycle through the streets of a city at night, driving through tunnels and on bridges. As he rides, the taillights of his bike emits a trailing stream of lights. Between shots of him speeding in the streets, Sean is also seen posing with Migos in an abandoned warehouse. At the end of the video, Sean crashes into another vehicle, sending him flying into the air.

== Charts ==
Chart (2017)	Peak position
Canada Hot 100 (Billboard)	79
US Billboard Hot 100	70
US Hot R&B/Hip-Hop Songs (Billboard)	26

== Certifications ==
Region	Certification	Certified units/sales
United States (RIAA)	Gold	500,000^{‡}
^{‡} Sales+streaming figures based on certification alone.
