= Earlly Mac =

American rapper

- Born: Earl Patrick Taylor; Detroit, Michigan, U.S.
- Genres: Hip hop
- Occupations: Rapper; songwriter; record producer
- Years active: 2010–present
- Label: Pulse

Earl Patrick Taylor, known as Earlly Mac, is an American rapper, songwriter, and record producer. He is known for his collaborations with Big Sean. In 2010, he released his debut mixtape, Party Up!. His debut EP, God Knows, was self-released in January 2015. The EP included the single "Do It Again" featuring Big Sean, which peaked at number 6 on the Billboard Twitter Emerging Artists chart.

== Early life and career ==
Earl Patrick Taylor was born in Detroit, Michigan. Mac grew up listening to Eminem, Rock Bottom, D12 and Obie Trice.

In 2016, he signed to Pulse Music Group as a songwriter, co-writing notable songs such as G-Eazy's song "No Limit", Big Sean's song "Pull Up n Wreck", and Jhené Aiko's song "None of Your Concern", among others.

== Discography ==
=== EPs ===
List of EPs, showing selected details
Title	Details
God Knows	Released: January 27, 2015; Label: Foolay Ent., LLC; Format: Digital download

=== Mixtapes ===
List of mixtapes, showing selected details
Title	Details
Party Up!	Released: November 29, 2010
Lord N' Taylor (with SAYITAINTTONE)	Released: October 6, 2012
Cousin Trap	Released: June 2, 2015; Label: Foolay Ent., LLC; Format: Digital download

=== Singles ===
==== As lead artist ====
Year	Title	Album
2013	"Cold"	Non-album singles
2014	"Something" (featuring Sebastian Mikael)	Non-album singles
2014	"#LikePac" (featuring Dusty Mcfly, SayItAintTone and Big Quis)	Non-album singles
2014	"#LikeKanye"	God Knows
2015	"Big Bank" (featuring Trae Tha Truth and Bizzy Crook)	Cousin Trap
2015	"Chaldean Talk" (featuring Supakaine)	Cousin Trap
2015	"Be Ok" (featuring Trinidad James)	Cousin Trap
2016	"Do It Again" (featuring Big Sean)	God Knows
2016	"Bae" (featuring Drey Skonie)	Non-album single

==== As featured artist ====
Year	Title	Album
2013	"Mula (Remix)" (Big Sean featuring 2 Chainz, Meek Mill and Earlly Mac)	Hall of Fame
2014	"Houseguest" (Jeff Dean featuring Earlly Mac)	Non-album singles
2014	"Do It for Tonight" (Richy Marciano featuring Earlly Mac)	Non-album singles
2016	"Tall Grass" (Supakaine featuring Earlly Mac)	Non-album singles
2020	"Infinity Stones" (Vega-Genesis featuring Earlly Mac)	Fool's Gold
