= Jacquees discography =

American singer discography

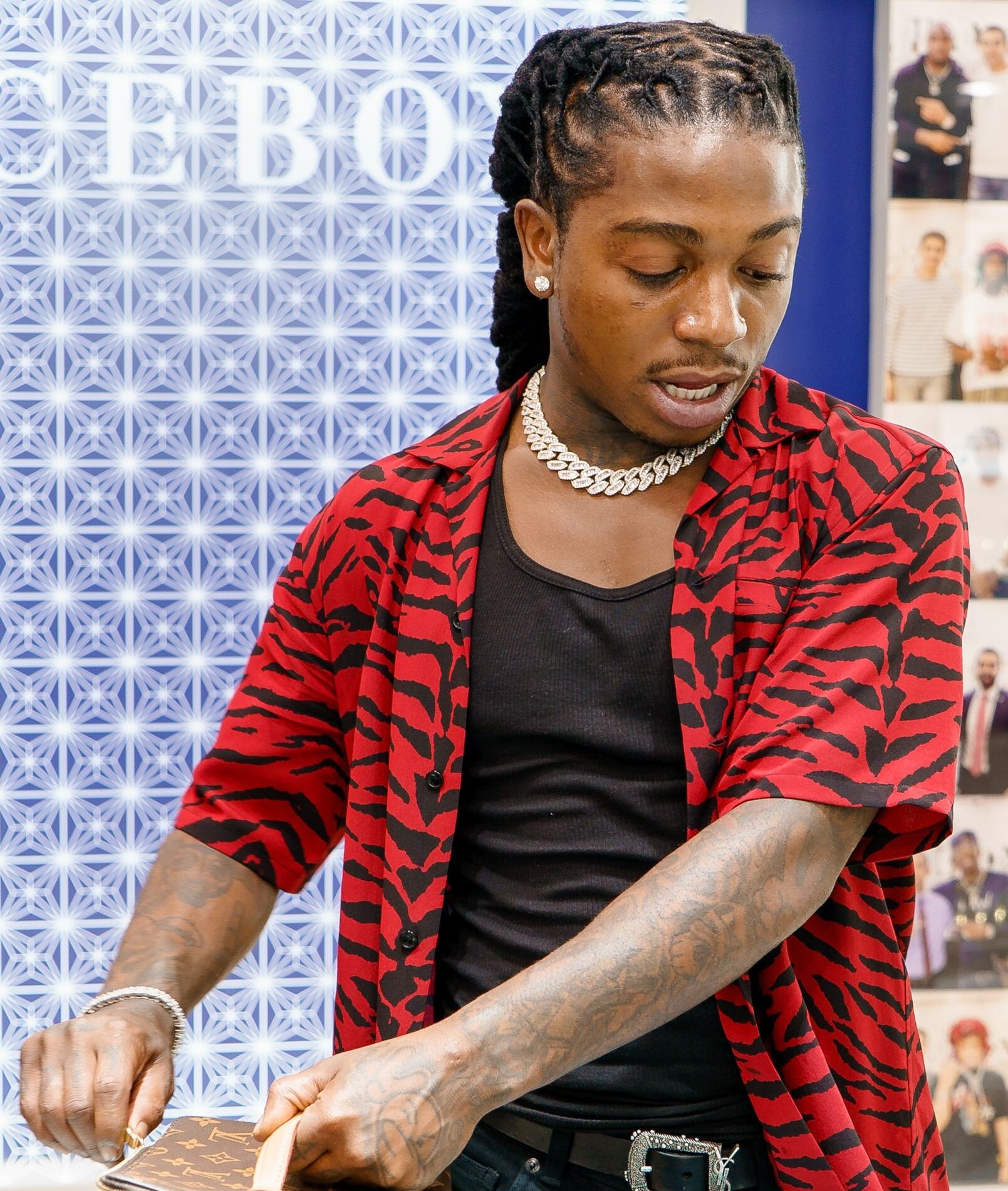
- Studio albums: 5
- EPs: 5
- Mixtapes: 13

The discography of American R&B singer Jacquees consists of four solo studio albums, five extended plays, twelve mixtapes, a collaborative album and numerous singles. His releases have been issued primarily through Cash Money Records and Republic Records.

== Albums ==
=== Studio albums ===
List of studio albums with selected details
Title	Album details	Peak chart positions					Sales	Certifications
Title	Album details	US	US R&B/HH	US R&B	CAN	FRA	Sales	Certifications
4275	Released: June 15, 2018; Label: Cash Money, Republic Records, Universal; Format: Streaming, digital download, CD	35	18	3	—	—		RIAA: Platinum
King of R&B	Released: November 8, 2019; Label: Cash Money, Republic Records, Universal; Formats: Streaming, digital download, CD	20	15	4	66	164	US: 17,000	
Sincerely For You	Released: December 16, 2022; Label: Cash Money, Republic Records, Universal; Formats: Streaming, digital download, CD	163	—	20	—	—		
Baby Making	Released: November 1, 2024; Label: Cash Money, Republic Records; Formats: Streaming, digital download, CD	—	—	—	—	—		
Fuck a Friend Zone 2 (with Dej Loaf)	Released: February 14, 2025; Label: Cash Money, Republic Records, FYB Records, Yellow World LLC, EMPIRE; Formats: Streaming, digital download, CD	—	—	—	—	—		

== Extended plays ==
List of extended plays with selected details
Title	Extended play details
I Am Jacquees	Released: July 23, 2011; Label: Self-released; Format: Digital download
19	Released: March 25, 2014; Label: Self-released; Format: Digital download
Lost At Sea (with Birdman)	Released: June 3, 2016; Label: Cash Money; Format: Digital download
This Time I'm Serious	Released: March 16, 2018; Label: Cash Money; Format: Digital download
Christmas in Decatur	Released: December 13, 2019; Label: Cash Money, Republic; Format: Digital download

== Mixtapes ==
List of mixtapes with selected details
Title	Mixtape details
Round of Applause	Released: August 11, 2011; Label: Self-released; Format: Digital download
Fan Affiliated	Released: August 29, 2012; Label: Self-released; Format: Digital download
Quemix	Released: May 1, 2013; Label: Self-released; Format: Digital download
Quemix 2	Released: January 6, 2015; Label: Cash Money; Format: Digital download
Mood	Released: January 25, 2016; Label: Cash Money; Format: Digital download
Since You Playin'	Released: January 25, 2017; Label: Cash Money; Format: Digital download
Fuck a Friend Zone (with Dej Loaf)	Released: February 10, 2017; Label: Cash Money; Format: Digital download
Lost At Sea 2 (with Birdman)	Released: November 15, 2018; Label: Cash Money; Format: Digital download, CD
Exit 68	Released: September 7, 2020; Label: Cash Money; Format: Digital download
Back to Me	Released: January 25, 2024; Label: Cash Money; Format: Digital download
Quemix 5	Released: June 21, 2024; Label: Cash Money; Format: Digital download
Mood 2	Released: July 31, 2026; Label: Cash Money; Format: Digital download

== Singles ==
=== As lead artist ===
List of singles as lead artist, with selected chart positions and certifications, showing year released and album name
Title	Year	Peak chart positions			Certifications	Album
Title	Year	US	US R&B/HH	US R&B	Certifications	Album
"Feel It" (featuring Rich Homie Quan and Lloyd)	2014	—	—	—	RIAA: Gold	19
"Iz Dat You"	2014	—	—	—		Non-album single
"Pandora"	2014	—	—	—		Mood
"Come Thru" (featuring Rich Homie Quan)	2015	—	—	24		Mood
"Like Baby"	2015	—	—	—		Mood
"Ms. Kathy (Make Up)"	2015	—	—	—		Non-album single
"B.E.D."	2016	69	30	9	RIAA: 4× Platinum	Mood and 4275
"Good Feeling"	2016	—	—	—		Non-album single
"At the Club" (featuring Dej Loaf)	2017	86	40	4	RIAA: 2× Platinum	Fuck a Friend Zone
"Inside" (featuring Trey Songz)	2018	—	—	22	RIAA: Gold	4275
"You"	2018	58	26	4	RIAA: 3× Platinum	4275 and Lost at Sea 2
"Your Peace" (featuring Lil Baby)	2019	—	— (Note: Your Peace" did not enter the Hot R&B/Hip-Hop Songs chart, but peaked at number seven on the Bubbling Under R&B/Hip-Hop Singles chart.)	17	RIAA: Platinum	King of R&B
"Who's"	2019	—	—	—	RIAA: Gold	Non-album single
"Fact or Fiction"	2019	—	—	17		King of R&B
"Verify" (featuring Young Thug and Gunna)	2019	—	—	—		King of R&B
"Put In Work" (featuring Chris Brown)	2020	—	15	8	RIAA: Gold	Non-album single
"Freaky As Me" (featuring Latto)	2021	—	—	—		Non-album single
"Bed Friend" (featuring Queen Naija)	2021	—	—	25		Non-album single
"Not Jus Anybody" (featuring Future)	2021	—	—	—		Non-album single
"Land of the Free" (featuring 2 Chainz)	2021	—	—	—		Non-album single
"Say Yea"	2022	—	—	—		Sincerely For You
"Still That"	2022	—	—	—		Sincerely For You
"Tipsy"	2022	—	—	—		Sincerely For You
"—" denotes a recording that did not chart or was not released in that territory.

=== As featured artist ===
List of singles as featured artist, with selected chart positions and certifications, showing year released and album name
Title	Year	Peak chart positions			Certifications	Album
Title	Year	US	US R&B/HH	US R&B	Certifications	Album
"She a Rocket" (DC DaVinci featuring Jacquees)	2012	—	—	—		Non-album single
"I Told Her" (Issa featuring Jacquees)	2012	—	—	—		King Issa
"Sex Shit" (DC DaVinci featuring Jacquees)	2014	—	—	—		Non-album single
"Ocean" (TK Kravitz featuring Jacquees)	2018	76	28	7	RIAA: Platinum	2.0
"Black Bonnie" (Wale featuring Jacquees)	2018	—	—	—		Wow... That's Crazy
"Freaky with You" (Nelly featuring Jacquees)	2018	—	—	—		Non-album single
"Work Sumn" (Kirko Bangz featuring Tory Lanez and Jacquees)	2018	—	—	18		Non-album single
"Alone" (Dave East featuring Jacquees)	2019	—	—	—		Survival
"Why" (Angelica Vila featuring Jacquees)	2020	—	—	24		Deception Szn 1
"What's On Your Mind" (K Camp featuring Jacquees)	2020	— (Note: "What's On Your Mind" did not enter the Hot 100, but did peak at number 17 on the Bubbling Under Hot 100 chart.)	42	—		K.I.S.S. 5
"No Filter" (JC featuring Jacquees)	2020	—	—	—		Non-album single
"Only Fan" (Kiana Ledé featuring Jacquees)	2020	—	—	—		Kiki
"Lets Not Fall In Love" (Kodie Shane featuring Jacquees)	2021	—	—	—		TBA
"Baddie" (Sean Garrett featuring Jacquees)	2024	—	—	—		Non-album single
"—" denotes a recording that did not chart or was not released in that territory.
