= Randy DuBurke =

American artist (born 1962)

- Born: Randy DuBurke; 1962 (age 63–64) Washington, Georgia
- Areas: Writer, Penciller, Inker
- Notable works: The Moon Ring (2003); Malcolm X: A Graphic Biography (2006); Yummy: the Last Days of a Southside Shorty (2010)
- Awards: Steptoe Award 2003

Randy DuBurke (born 1962) is an American artist best known as the author and illustrator of the Steptoe Award winning book The Moon Ring (2003) and as the illustrator of Yummy: the Last Days of a Southside Shorty (2010). He previously worked as a comic book artist in the 1980s and 1990s.

== Early life ==
Randy DuBurke was born in Washington, Georgia in 1962. He graduated from New York Technical College with a graphic arts degree.

== Career ==
DuBurke made his debut in the comics industry with the story "A Life in the Day" as part of the DC Comics Bonus Book program in Doom Patrol vol. 2 #9 (June 1988). He drew the "Black Canary" feature in Action Comics Weekly in 1988 and contributed to the various volumes of Paradox Press' The Big Book Of series from 1994 to 2000. In the early 2000s, he began working in the field of children's books and his The Moon Ring received the Steptoe Award in 2003. DuBurke collaborated with writer Andy Helfer on Malcolm X: A Graphic Biography (2006) which has been recommended as part of a "Suggested Core List of Graphic Novel Titles for High School Students". Writer Greg Neri and DuBurke produced Yummy: the Last Days of a Southside Shorty in 2010 about the life of Robert "Yummy" Sandifer. The book was praised by Publishers Weekly, Booklist, and Kirkus Reviews. The School Library Journal noted that "Playing not just with expressions and characters but with light and shadow as well, it's DuBurke's choices that lift this book up and make it far more compelling than it would be merely on its own." As of 2014, DuBurke was working on a graphic novel with jazz saxophonist Wayne Shorter. The graphic novel was included with Shorter's Emanon album released in August 2018.

== Personal life ==
DuBurke resides in Switzerland with his wife and children.

== Bibliography ==
=== Books ===
- The Moon Ring 36 pages, 2003, ISBN 978-0811834872
- Just For You!: The Bravest Girls In The World (written by Olivia George) 32 pages, 2004, ISBN 978-0439568753
- Halloween Night on Shivermore Street (written by Pam Pollack and Meg Belviso) 32 pages, 2004, ISBN 978-0811839464
- Catching the Moon: The Story of a Young Girl's Baseball Dream (written by Crystal Hubbard) 32 pages, 2005, ISBN 978-1584302438
- Little Mister 22 pages, 2006, ISBN 978-0811849548
- When It's Six O'Clock in San Francisco: A Trip Through Time (written by Cynthia Jaynes Omololu) 32 pages, 2009, ISBN 978-0618768271
- Yummy: the Last Days of a Southside Shorty (written by Greg Neri), 96 pages, 2010, ISBN 978-1584302674
- Best Shot in the West: The Adventures of Nat Love (written by Patricia McKissack and Fredrick McKissack) 129 pages, 2012, ISBN 978-0811857499
- Game Changer: John McLendon and the Secret Game (written by John Coy) 32 pages, 2015, ISBN 978-1467726047

=== Comic books ===
==== DC Comics ====
- Action Comics #609–616, 624–634 (Black Canary); #750 (Superman) (1988–1999)
- Checkmate #33 (1991)
- Doom Patrol vol. 2 #9, Annual #1 (1988)
- The Flash Secret Files and Origins #1 (1997)
- Flinch #7 (1999)
- Green Arrow vol. 2 #7, Annual #2 (1988–1989)
- JLA Gallery #1 (1997)
- JLA Secret Files and Origins #2 (1998)
- Justice League Quarterly #17 (1994)
- Martian Manhunter Special #1 (1996)
- New Gods Secret Files and Origins #1 (1998)
- Showcase '96 #6–7 (Firestorm) (1996)
- Weird War Tales vol. 2 #1 (1997)
- Who's Who in the DC Universe #10 (1991)
- Wonder Woman Gallery #1 (1996)
- Wonder Woman Secret Files and Origins #1 (1998)

==== Eureka Productions ====
- Graphic Classics – African-American Classics #22 (2011)

==== Farrar, Straus and Giroux ====
- Malcolm X: A Graphic Biography #1 (2006)

==== Marvel Comics ====
- Tales of the Marvels: Inner Demons #1 (1996)

==== Paradox Press ====
- The Big Book Of Bad (1998)
- The Big Book Of Conspiracies (1995)
- The Big Book Of Death (1995)
- The Big Book Of Freaks (1996)
- The Big Book Of Grimm (1999)
- The Big Book Of Hoaxes (1996)
- The Big Book Of Little Criminals (1996)
- The Big Book Of Losers (1997)
- The Big Book Of Martyrs (1997)
- The Big Book Of Scandal (1997)
- The Big Book Of The 70s (2000)
- The Big Book Of the Unexplained (1997)
- The Big Book Of the Weird Wild West (1998)
- The Big Book Of Thugs (1996)
- The Big Book Of Urban Legends (1994)
- The Big Book Of Vice (1999)
- The Big Book Of Weirdos (1995)
- Gangland #2 (1998)
- Hunter's Heart #1–3 (1995)

== Awards and recognitions ==
He earned the following awards for Yummy: the Last Days of a Southside Shorty:

- the Simon Wiesenthal Center Museum of Tolerance Once Upon A World Children's Book Award
- 2011 YALSA Top 10 Quick Picks
- 2011 IRA Notable Book for a Global Society
- Chicago Public Library - Best Informational Books for Older Readers of 2010
- Cynsational Books of 2010

He earned the following awards for Best Shot in the West:

- 2012 BCCB Blue Ribbon Book
- 2013 Bank Street CBC Best Children's Book of the Year
- 2013 Society of Illustrators of Los Angeles Silver Award

Preceded by Jerome Lagarrigue	Steptoe Award for New Talent recipient 2003	Succeeded by Hope Anita Smith
