= Back Up (Dej Loaf song) =

Single by Dej Loaf featuring Big Sean

from the album ...And See That's the Thing
- Released: July 15, 2015
- Recorded: 2015
- Genre: Hip hop
- Length: 4:01
- Label: Columbia
- Songwriter(s): Deja Trimble; Kyle Adams; Sean Anderson; Clenton Gosberry
- Producer(s): iRocksays

Dej Loaf singles chronology
"Tied Up" (2015)	"Back Up" (2015)	"My Beyoncé" (2015)

Big Sean singles chronology
"One Man Can Change the World" (2015)	"Back Up" (2015)	"Play No Games" (2015)

"Back Up" is a song recorded by American rapper Dej Loaf, featuring American rapper Big Sean. It was released by Columbia Records on July 15, 2015, as the first single from Loaf's debut EP ...And See That's the Thing (2015). The song was written by Dej Loaf, Big Sean, Clenton Gosberry and Kyle Adams; the latter also produced the song under the pseudonym iRocksays. "Back Up" contains a sample from the song "Back Up Off Me" by DJ Clent.

== Music video ==
A music video, directed by Alex Nazari, was filmed at Detroit's Royal Skate Land. It premiered via Loaf's VEVO channel on October 5, 2015.

== Commercial performance ==
"Back Up" debuted at number 83 on the US Billboard Hot 100 for the chart dated October 24, 2015. The song was certified Platinum by the RIAA on October 19, 2016.

== Charts ==
=== Weekly charts ===
Chart (2015)	Peak position
US Billboard Hot 100	47
US Hot R&B/Hip-Hop Songs (Billboard)	16

=== Year-end charts ===
Chart (2016)	Position
US Hot Rap Songs (Billboard)	50
US Hot R&B/Hip-Hop Songs (Billboard)	87

== Certifications ==
Region	Certification	Certified units/sales
United States (RIAA)	Platinum	1,000,000^{‡}
^{‡} Sales+streaming figures based on certification alone.
