= Hands Free =

Hands Free may refer to:

- Handsfree, an adjective to describe equipment that can be used without the use of hands
- "Hands Free" (Law & Order), a 2004 episode of the television series Law & Order
- "Hands Free" (song), a 2016 song recorded by Keke Palmer
- Hands Free, a 1992 album by Craig McLachlan
- Hands-free driving, land vehicle where the driver does not have to touch anything with their hands to drive it
