= No Fear (disambiguation) =

No Fear is an American lifestyle clothing brand.

No Fear may also refer to:

== Music ==
- "No Fear" (Dej Loaf song), 2017
- "No Fear" (The Rasmus song), 2005
- "No Fear" (Terri Clark song), 2000
- "No Fear", a song by Agnostic Front from Something's Gotta Give, 1998
- "No Fear", a song by Falling In Reverse from Popular Monster, 2024
- "No Fear", a song by Greyson Chance from Somewhere Over My Head, 2016
- "No Fear", a song by O.G.C. from Da Storm, 1996
- "No Fear", a song by Saara Aalto competing to represent Finland in the Eurovision Song Contest 2016
- "No Fear", a song from the Swan Princess film soundtrack, 1994
- No Fear, a 2019 album by Beenie Gunter
- "No Fear", a song by Iceage from For Love of Grace & the Hereafter, 2026

== Other uses ==
- No-FEAR Act, a United States federal anti-discrimination law
- No Fear (professional wrestling), a tag team that consisted of Takao Omori and Yoshihiro Takayama
- No Fear: Dangerous Sports, a 1995 pinball machine
- No Fear Racing, a part-time NASCAR Sprint Cup Series team
