= No Fear (Dej Loaf song) =

Single by Dej Loaf
- Released: June 16, 2017
- Genre: Pop, Disco
- Length: 2:52
- Label: Columbia
- Songwriters: Christoph Andersson; Marlon Hampton; Deja Trimble

Dej Loaf singles chronology
"In Living Color (Oh Na Na)" (2016)	"No Fear" (2017)

"No Fear" is a song by American rapper-songwriter DeJ Loaf. The song was released on June 16, 2017, and became her fourth entry on the US Billboard Hot 100 chart, on which it peaked at number 100. The single became Loaf's first top 10 hit on the Rhythmic Songs chart as a lead artist, and also placed within the top 50 on the year-end Billboard rankings of Rhythmic Songs and Hot R&B Songs.

== Composition ==
Within the song's lyrics, Loaf yearns for her "high-school sweetheart."

The song was also noted for its more pop-oriented production. Rap-Up deemed its production "an upbeat bounce with pop sensibilities," while Billboard called it the most pop-oriented song she has recorded thus far, also noting its disco influence.

== Critical reception ==
Billboard placed the song at number 94 on their ranking of the 100 Best Songs of 2017, praising "its instantly memorable chorus and sun-bleached disco-meets-hip-hop swagger" and noting that it was more of a pop song than her previous work.

== Music video ==
The music video's concept was created by Rubberband, and was shot in a California desert. Loaf commented in an interview with Hollywood Life that "I wanted to feel very free in the video and show that freedom."

== Commercial performance ==
Upon its release, the song attained some commercial success. It debuted and peaked on the Billboard Hot 100 dated September 23, 2017, at number 100, becoming Loaf's fourth and most-recent entry to date on that chart.

The song also entered many genre-specific charts. On the Billboard Hot R&B/Hip-Hop Songs chart, "No Fear" peaked at number 43 on the chart dated September 23, 2017. On the Hot R&B Songs chart, the song became Loaf's first entry as a solo artist, eventually achieving a peak of number 13. On the R&B/Hip-Hop Airplay chart, the song peaked at number 33, while it peaked at number 5 on the Rhythmic Songs chart, becoming Loaf's highest-peaking entry on that chart as a lead artist, and her second-highest-peaking entry on the chart overall (behind Kid Ink's "Be Real," on which she was featured).

On the year-end ranking of the 50 most popular rhythmic songs of 2017, "No Fear" placed at number 40. The song also appeared on the year-end ranking of Hot R&B Songs, on which it placed at number 42.

== In popular culture ==
In early 2024, the song resurged in popularity on TikTok after almost 7 years since its release.

== Charts ==
=== Weekly charts ===
Chart (2017)	Peak position
US Billboard Hot 100	100
US Hot R&B/Hip-Hop Songs (Billboard)	43
US Rhythmic Airplay (Billboard)	5

=== Year-end charts ===
Chart (2017)	Position
US Rhythmic (Billboard)	40

== Certifications ==
Certifications for "No Fear"
Region	Certification	Certified units/sales
New Zealand (RMNZ)	Platinum	30,000^{‡}
United Kingdom (BPI)	Silver	200,000^{‡}
United States (RIAA)	Gold	500,000^{‡}
^{‡} Sales+streaming figures based on certification alone.
