= Mood (Jacquees album) =

Mixtape by Jacquees
- Released: January 10, 2016
- Recorded: 2015–16
- Genre: R&B; hip hop; trap
- Length: 55:04
- Label: Cash Money Records
- Producer: Nash B, Cornelias D Mcelrath
- Compiler: DJ Spinz

Jacquees chronology
Quemix 2 (2015)	Mood (2016)	Lost At Sea (2016)

Mood is a mixtape by American R&B singer Jacquees, released on January 10, 2016. The mixtape features guest appearances from rappers Kevin Gates, Dej Loaf, Young Scooter, Kirko Bangz, Rich Homie Quan and Birdman. Production was mostly handled by Nash B and hosted by DJ Spinz.

== Track listing ==
No.	Title	Producer(s)	Length
1.	"New Wave"		1:46
2.	"Set It Off"		2:46
3.	"Hot Girl"	E Sharpe	3:52
4.	"B.E.D."	Nash B	3:56
5.	"On It" (featuring Birdman)	Nash B	3:51
6.	"Know You"		2:44
7.	"Them Other Girls (Interlude)"	Nash B	3:37
8.	"Ready" (featuring Birdman)	Nash B	3:35
9.	"9" (featuring Kevin Gates & Young Scooter)		3:25
10.	"Ex Games"	Chris King	2:31
11.	"Pandora"		4:09
12.	"Bounce" (featuring Dej Loaf)	Nash B	3:26
13.	"R&B Nigga"	ForteBowie	4:04
14.	"Come Thru" (featuring Rich Homie Quan)	KB	4:01
15.	"Like Baby"	Cassius Jay	3:36
16.	"T-Shirt & Panties" (featuring Kirko Bangz)		3:47
Total length:			55:06
