= Yummy: the Last Days of a Southside Shorty =

Graphic novel by Greg Neri

- First edition (publ. Lee & Low Books)
- Author: G. Neri
- Illustrator: Randy DuBurke
- Publisher: Lee and Low Books
- Publication date: July 31, 2010

Yummy: the Last Days of a Southside Shorty is a 2010 graphic novel by Greg Neri with art by Randy DuBurke, published by Lee and Low Books. The story is about Robert "Yummy" Sandifer, who was eleven years old in 1994 when he became a fugitive from justice after killing a neighbor girl while he was shooting at somebody else during a gang initiation. Neri creates a fictional narrator who watches what happens to Yummy when he seeks help from the gang he is trying to impress. Instead, they turn on him when he becomes too much of a liability to them.

== Critical reception ==
Yummy was well received by critics, including five starred reviews from Kirkus Reviews, Booklist, School Library Journal, The Bulletin of the Center for Children's Books, and VOYA.

Kirkus Reviews called the novel "a haunting, ripped-from-the-headlines account of youth gang violence in Chicago," and highlighted how it "provides the backdrop for a crucial meditation on right and wrong."

== Awards and honors ==
Yummy won a 2011 Coretta Scott King Author Honor Award and was named one of the Best Books of 2010 by Publishers Weekly, Booklist, and Kirkus Reviews. Chicago Public Library included it on their "Best Informational Books for Older Readers of 2010" list.

The novel also received the following awards and honors:

- 2011 YALSA Top 10 Quick Picks
- 2011 IRA Notable Book for a Global Society
- Cynsational Books of 2010
- 2011 Glyph Award nomination – Story of the Year
- 2011 Simon Wiesenthal Center Museum of Tolerance Once Upon A World Children's Book Award
