= Big Dreez =

Album by American rapper Dreezy

Mixtape by Dreezy
- Released: January 25, 2019
- Genre: Hip hop
- Length: 31:11
- Label: Interscope
- Producers: Akeel Henry; BongoByTheWay; Cassio; DZL; G. Ry; London on da Track; OG Parker; Pi'erre Bourne; Southside; Swish; Take a Daytrip; Tee Romano; Xeryus

Dreezy chronology
No Hard Feelings (2016)	Big Dreez (2019)

Singles from Big Dreez
- 1. "Where Them $ @" Released: June 8, 2018; 2. "Chanel Slides" Released: December 14, 2018; 3. "RIP Aretha" Released: January 18, 2019

Big Dreez is the fifth mixtape by American rapper Dreezy. It was released on January 25, 2019, by Interscope Records. The mixtape features guest vocals by Derez De'Shon, Jacquees, Jeremih, Kash Doll, and rapper Offset. It also features production by Pi'erre Bourne, London on da Track, Swish, Take a Daytrip, and Southside, among others. The mixtape received positive reviews, with music critic Robert Christgau calling it a "step up" for Dreezy.

== Critical reception ==
Professional ratings
Review scores
Source	Rating
HipHopDX	4/5
Pitchfork	7.3/10
Vice	B+

Reviewing the mixtape for Vice, Robert Christgau said Dreezy's "only misstep here is a new Jeremih collab where—inevitably in a world where good sex is so often a stroke of luck—their concerted attempt to top the relaxed 'Body' with the overreaching 'Ecstasy' comes off forced and stiff. Romantic duets with Jacquees and Derez De'Shon aim lower and hit higher, however, and in general she sidles into money and fame brags with a reassuring ease that coexists nicely with her pitch-corrected raps and croons."

== Track listing ==
Credits adapted from Tidal.

No.	Title	Writer(s)	Producer(s)	Length
1.	"Chicken Noodle Soup"	Seandrea Sledge; Joshua Luellen	Southside	2:12
2.	"Play Wit Ya"	Sledge; David Biral; Denzel Baptiste	Take a Daytrip	3:15
3.	"Chanel Slides" (featuring Kash Doll)	Sledge; Arkeisha Knight; Jordan Jenks	Pi'erre Bourne	2:54
4.	"Showin Out"	Sledge; Xeryus Gittens; Joshua Parker; Terrence Williams	OG Parker; Tee Romano; Xeryus	3:27
5.	"Ecstasy" (featuring Jeremih)	Sledge; Cassio Lopes; Uforo Ebong; Jeremy Felton	BongoByTheWay; Cassio	3:07
6.	"Love Someone" (featuring Jacquees)	Sledge; Rodriguez Broadnax; Williams; Ryan Martinez; Parker	G. Ry; Tee Romano; OG Parker	4:07
7.	"Cash App" (featuring Offset)	Sledge; Kiari Cephus; Samuel Ahana; Elliott Trent; Anthony Clemons	Swish	2:43
8.	"RIP Aretha"	Sledge; Michael Holmes; Akeel Henry	Mike DZL; Akeel Henry	2:52
9.	"No Love" (featuring Derez De'Shon)	Sledge; London Holmes; Derez De'Shon; Rayshawn Bennett; Hector Chaparro	London on da Track	3:21
10.	"Where Them $ @"	Sledge; Holmes; Kevin Richardson; Aubrey Robinson; Chaparro; Jocelyn Donald; Raymond Taylor II	London on da Track	3:13
Total length:				31:11

== Personnel ==
Credits adapted from Tidal.

- Max Lord – recording (track 1)
- Brandon Hay – recording (track 4)
- Lloyd "2Fly" Mizell – recording (tracks: 5–6)
- Patrik Plummer – mixing (tracks: 1–4, 7–8), recording (tracks: 2–3, 6–9)
- Erik Madrid – mixing (tracks: 5, 9)
- Roark Bailey – mixing (track 10)
- William Binderup – mixing assistant (tracks: 5, 9)
- Kevin Peterson – mastering (tracks: 1–9)
