= Gail Ruffu =

American horse trainer

- Born: 1950 (age 75–76)
- Occupation: Horse trainer

Gail Elizabeth Ruffu (born circa 1950) is an American horse trainer and is the subject of a 2018 graphic novel by Greg Neri, Grand Theft Horse. She studied riding in Europe as a teen. Returning to the United States, she was a riding instructor in the 1980s. She began training racehorses in the 1990s, promoting the use of gentle methods without the use of any type of medication. Ruffu's training style was unorthodox and she was once suspended for nine months from California tracks in part for her activism, though the suspension was later reversed. In 2004, Ruffu became a 20% owner of a horse named Urgent Envoy, whom she trained, and after being fired as his trainer, became the subject of controversy when she took the horse from his other owners. She was charged with theft and later acquitted, but her racing license was suspended for almost seven years. To this day, the horse remains at an undisclosed location. Ruffu continues to train other racehorses but to date has never won a reported race.

== Biography ==
=== Early years ===
Ruffu is of Creole descent. Her father was in the Air Force, and she and her 12 siblings moved throughout the world during her childhood. Ruffu was in Denton, Texas in the early 1960s, where she attended religious school for grade school students at the Immaculate Conception Catholic Church. In Texas, she took part in barrel racing in 1966. Ruffu graduated from Denton High School in 1967. At age 17, she started studying in Europe, learning equestrianism and stable management. Ruffu became a riding instructor, receiving horse master and assistant instructor accreditation from the British Horse Society. She also studied dressage, worked at stables in Germany, and competed in show jumping. She was based in Seattle by the late 1980s. She also worked as the editor and publisher of the Washington Horseman's Directory.

=== Racing career ===
She moved to California in the early 1990s. She began working at the track, starting as a hot walker and by the late 1990s was an exercise rider, noted for her gentle handling of horses. In 1999, she hired attorney Steve Haney and filed a lawsuit against "several California horse racing entities" because she had been banned from Santa Anita Park, Del Mar and the Hollywood Park racetracks for nine months. Racing stewards would not comment on the reasons for her suspension, but Ruffu stated that it was, in part, because of her training style, her activism against use of drugs on racehorses, and her opposition to racing two-year-old horses. The suspension was reversed by an administrative tribunal in 1998, but she asked the courts to award her compensation for lost income. Ruffu was also concerned about the number of horses injured and killed in the racing industry, believing that overuse of medication allowed horse to race while injured. Haney was impressed with Ruffu's skills with horses and expressed an interest in owning a horse with her in the future.

She was listed as trainer at a reported race for the first time in 2001. In 2003, Ruffu, Haney and three other investors bought a horse that Ruffu wanted to train. Ruffu's 20% ownership stake was in exchange for her services as a trainer. The other owners covered her costs. The three-year-old colt, bred by Pat and Monty Roberts, was named Urgent Envoy. For a year, Ruffu trained Urgent Envoy according to her methods. She limited workouts and didn't use analgesic drugs to mask pain in the horse, nor use the common anti-bleeding medication Lasix, and instead allowed Urgent Envoy to rest in order to recover naturally from injuries. Urgent Envoy had his first race at Hollywood Park on June 16, 2004. He drifted wide on the track and finished last, almost 10 lengths behind the winner. Ruffu said jockey had difficulty riding Urgent Envoy, but Haney said there were more problems: "he couldn't participate in the post parade because he hadn't been taught how to walk with the other horses.... It just looked like he wasn't prepared.”

The horse was scheduled to race again on July 7, but the day before the race, a veterinarian recommended that Urgent Envoy rest, due to a sore shin, so the horse was scratched. Ten days later, Ruffu was voted out as trainer by the other owners. After $17,000 in expenses and no results, the other owners wanted a more experienced trainer. They hired Richard Baltas, making plans to move the horse from Ruffu's stables to Baltas'. This angered Ruffu, who "said her contract required the horse remain under her training." Urgent Envoy was moved out of her barn on July 17, with standby from local law enforcement. Ruffu later filed a police report, claiming there was a physical altercation between her and the handlers who moving the horse. She and other eyewitnesses dispute what actually happened and no charges were filed.

Shortly thereafter, Urgent Envoy was diagnosed with a stress fracture and was sent to a ranch in San Diego County to recover. She visited the horse there and talked to veterinarians who stated to her that Urgent Envoy should have six months for recovery. Yet, three months later, Urgent Envoy was brought back to Hollywood Park. Although Baltas had him on a 30-day walking regimen, she was concerned that the horse's injury was not healed and if he raced again, he could suffer a fatal breakdown. "I began to suspect that they might be about ready to try to get an insurance policy payoff by going ahead and killing him," she said. Haney disputed this, commenting that they didn't even have an insurance policy on the horse.

On December 24, 2004, Ruffu took Urgent Envoy out of the stables and hid him at an undisclosed location. She sent the other owners an email saying, "Merry Christmas, boys." A judge ordered Ruffu to return Urgent Envoy and she ignored the order. She was charged with theft. She lost her training license for Hollywood Park and was again ordered to return the horse. Ruffu refused. Haney hired a private investigator to find the horse and in 2006, Ruffu went to trial, but was acquitted by jury. Nonetheless, Ruffu lost her licenses to work at any racetrack in the United States. In 2009, Ruffu sued the other owners of Urgent Envoy for breach of contract, but she lost. Again she was ordered to return the horse and again, she refused.

In 2011, she was able to reapply for her trainer's license. She has trained racehorses from 2012 through 2019, but to date has yet to win a single race. Ruffu still believes her actions were not theft, but rescue, and as of 2019 has not disclosed the location of Urgent Envoy. In 2018, Grand Theft Horse by Ruffu's cousin, Greg Neri, was published. The graphic novel describes the events surrounding Urgent Envoy and tells of Ruffu's past through flashbacks.
