= Try Me (Dej Loaf song) =

Single by Dej Loaf
- Released: October 15, 2014
- Recorded: 2014
- Genre: Hip hop
- Length: 3:38
- Songwriter: Deja Trimble
- Producer: DDS

Dej Loaf singles chronology
"Try Me" (2014)	"We Good" (2014)

"Try Me" is the debut single by American hip hop recording artist Dej Loaf. The song was released on October 15, 2014 and was produced by DDS. The song peaked at number 45 on the U.S. Billboard Hot 100.

== Music video ==
The music video for "Try Me" was released on September 24, 2014, on her YouTube account, and was later released on her Vevo account.

== Commercial performance ==
"Try Me" peaked at number 45 on the U.S. Billboard Hot 100. The song was certified Gold on April 3, 2015, in the United States.

== Charts ==
Chart (2014–2015)	Peak position
US Billboard Hot 100	45
US Hot R&B/Hip-Hop Songs (Billboard)	12
