= No Hard Feelings (Dreezy album) =

Studio album by Dreezy
- Released: July 15, 2016
- Recorded: 2015–16
- Genre: Hip hop; R&B
- Length: 51:09
- Label: Interscope
- Producer: Dreezy (exec.); BloodPop; Brody Brown; Cardo; Cubeatz; Deputy; Detail; Dre Butterz; Fayo & Chill; Greg Kurstin; J Hill; Key Wane; Nick Smith; OZ; Rance; Southside; Terrace Martin; TM88; ZthePRO

Dreezy chronology
From Now On (2015)	No Hard Feelings (2016)	Big Dreez (2019)

Singles from No Hard Feelings
- 1. "Body" Released: January 23, 2016; 2. "We Gon Ride" Released: June 17, 2016; 3. "Close to You" Released: June 20, 2016; 4. "Spazz" Released: July 8, 2016; 5. "Wasted" Released: November 15, 2016

No Hard Feelings is the debut studio album by American rapper Dreezy. It was released on July 15, 2016, by Interscope Records. The nineteen-track project features guest appearances from Gucci Mane, Wale, Jeremih, and T-Pain.

== Background ==
On June 23, 2016, Dreezy revealed the cover art, track listing, and the release date for her upcoming major-label debut album. In an interview with XXL magazine, she stated: "I came in with a whole crew; it's just me now," Dreezy said. "I found out a lot of people are fake, a lot of people was around for the wrong reasons. I found out some people are thieves. I lost my boyfriend; I'm not with him no more. I just really had to be independent. I always been independent, I just had to be about me. That’s what my daddy was basically teaching me anyway. You got to be selfish; you can’t worry about everybody else. I was worried about the producer, I was worried about my boyfriend, I was worried by my friends, my family.

== Singles ==
The album's lead single, called "Body" was released on January 23, 2016. The song features guest vocals from American R&B recording artist Jeremih, while the production was provided by BloodPop. The song was described as an upbeat club anthem about sex. The song debuted at number 62 on the US Billboard Hot 100, number 24 on the US Hot R&B/Hip-Hop Songs, number 32 on the US Rhythmic, and at number 14 on the Mainstream R&B/Hip-Hop charts. The music video premiered on May 13, 2016, via MTV Jams.

The album's second single, called "We Gon Ride" was released on June 17, 2016. The song features guest verse from American rapper Gucci Mane, while the production was provided by Southside. The music video premiered on August 4, 2016, via WorldStarHipHop.

The album's third single, called "Close To You" was released on June 20, 2016. The song features guest vocals from a fellow American recording artist T-Pain, while the production was provided by Rance and Terrace Martin. The music video premiered on June 22, 2016.

The album's fourth single, called "Spazz" was released on July 8, 2016. The song was produced by TM88 and Cubeatz.

The album's fifth and final single, "Wasted" was sent to rhythmic radio on November 15, 2016. The song was produced by Dre Butterz, Greg Kurstin and Detail. The music video was released on December 15, 2016.

== Music and lyrics ==
No Hard Feelings includes skits that "pull together a loose narrative that finds Dreezy at the center of a love triangle with a philandering boyfriend and a new would-be beau." Musicwise, the first half of the album is filled with hardcore drill beats while the other half showcases Dreezy's vocal abilities.

"We Gon Ride" is a "best friend anthem, perfect for newly singled friends who want to hit the town." "Body" is a "candy-coated duet" produced by BloodPop. "Wasted" is a "vivid piece of micro-storytelling about the imperfect dealings with relationships and alcohol."

== Critical reception ==
Professional ratings
Aggregate scores
Source	Rating
Metacritic	73/100
Review scores
Source	Rating
Exclaim!	7/10
Vice	(3-star Honorable Mention)
XXL	3/5
Pitchfork	7.7/10
AllMusic	3.5/5 stars
HipHopDX	3.3/5

At Metacritic, the album received an average score of 73 points based on 5 reviews.

Sheldon Pearce of Pitchfork described the album as a "fully-formed offering that seamlessly balances her more rugged raps with pristine pop songs and tender slow jams." Writing for Exclaim!, Rob Boffard called the album "an exciting step forward from Dreezy's previous project, Schizo." Andy Kellman of AllMusic wrote that Dreezy "adeptly mixes grit and gloss." Scott Glaysher of XXL commented that "Dreezy attempts to find a happy medium between street rapper and silky songstress." On the other hand, Eric Diep of HipHopDX pointed out that the album "sounds like a combination of the current trends in Hip Hop", making listeners believe that "she’s more of a chameleon than a trendsetter".

== Track listing ==
No.	Title	Writer(s)	Producer(s)	Length
1.	"Wake da Fuck Up Intro"	Seandrea Sledge		0:24
2.	"We Gon Ride" (featuring Gucci Mane)	Sledge; Radric Davis; Joshua Luellen	Southside	3:44
3.	"That’s My Cousin (Skit)"	Sledge		0:16
4.	"Spazz"	Sledge; Kevin Gomringer; Tim Gomringer; Bryan Simmons	TM88; Cubeatz	3:26
5.	"Body" (featuring Jeremih)	Sledge; Brittany Hazzard; Michael Tucker; Jeremy Felton	BloodPop	3:52
6.	"Drunk Jamal (Skit)"	Sledge		0:52
7.	"Wasted"	Sledge; Deandre Coker; Noel Fisher; Greg Kurstin	Dre Butterz; Greg Kurstin; Detail	3:34
8.	"Afford My Love" (featuring Wale)	Sledge; Christian Stalnecker; Larrance Dopson; Olubowale Akintimehin; Terrace Martin	Rance; Martin	5:39
9.	"Don't Know Me"	Sledge; Brody Brown; Nick Smith	Nick Smith; Brody Brown; Rance	3:18
10.	"Da Guys (Sean Skit)"	Sledge		0:29
11.	"Bad Bitch"	Sledge; Dewane Weir II	Key Wane	3:16
12.	"Worth It"	Sledge; Elly Duhe; Joseph Hill; Andrew Fridge; Zachary Williams; Taji Ausar; Adam "Bruza" Wright	J Hill	2:25
13.	"See What You On"	Sledge; Ozan Yildirim; Ronald LaTour	Cardo; OZ	3:44
14.	"What’s da Tea? (Skit)"	Sledge		0:39
15.	"Close to You" (featuring T-Pain)	Sledge; Stalnecker; Martin; Larrace Dopsin; Faheem Najm	Rance; Martin	4:49
16.	"Ready"	Sledge; Robert Henley; Brian Defeo; Roy Ayers	Fayo & Chill	3:19
17.	"Sean vs. Jamal (Skit)"	Sledge		0:26
18.	"Break the News"	Sledge; Stalnecker	Stalnecker	3:36
19.	"Invincible"	Sledge; Jamil Pierre; Stalnecker; Ngozi Maduakolam	Deputy; ZthePRO	3:21

== Charts ==
Chart (2016)	Peak position
US Billboard 200	101
US Top R&B/Hip-Hop Albums (Billboard)	15

== Release history ==
Date	Format(s)	Label
15 July 2016	Digital download	Interscope
16 September 2016	CD	Interscope
