= Ryda (song) =

Single by The Game featuring DeJ Loaf
- Released: April 23, 2015
- Recorded: 2015
- Genre: Hip hop
- Length: 3:29
- Label: Blood Money; eOne
- Producers: Mikhail; Pops

The Game singles chronology
"Don't Shoot" (2014)	"Ryda" (2015)	"100" (2015)

Dej Loaf singles chronology
"Me U & Hennessy" (2015)	"Ryda" (2015)	"Tied Up" (2015)

"Ryda" is a song by American rapper The Game featuring American rapper DeJ Loaf, produced by Canadian music producers Mikhail and Pops. It was released as a single on April 23, 2015.

== Music video ==
On May 4, 2015 Game uploaded the music video for "Ryda" on his VEVO channel. Directed by Benny Boom, the video is inspired by Bonnie and Clyde, with both Loaf and Game committing an armored truck robbery by gunpoint and exploding said truck after taking all the money.

== Track listing ==
- Digital download
1. "Ryda" (Explicit) (featuring DeJ Loaf) – 3:29

== Charts ==
Chart (2015)	Peak position
US Bubbling Under R&B/Hip-Hop Singles (Billboard)	2
US R&B/Hip-Hop Airplay (Billboard)	48
US Rhythmic Airplay (Billboard)	36

== Release history ==
Region	Date	Format	Label
United States	April 23, 2015	Digital download	Blood Money Entertainment; Entertainment One
