= ...And See That's the Thing =

EP by Dej Loaf
- Released: July 31, 2015
- Recorded: 2015
- Genre: Hip hop
- Length: 23:01
- Label: Columbia
- Producers: DDS; Go Grizzly; iRocksays; Izze The Producer; The-A-Team; Smash David; J. Vaughn

Dej Loaf chronology
Sell Sole (2014)	...And See That's the Thing (2015)

Singles from ...And See That's the Thing
- 1. "Back Up" Released: July 15, 2015; 2. "Hey There" Released: July 23, 2015

...And See That's the Thing (stylized as #AndSeeThatsTheThing) is the first extended play by American hip hop recording artist Dej Loaf. It was released exclusively to digital media outlets on July 31, 2015 by Columbia Records.

== Critical reception ==
The album has received good reviews with Sidney Madden of XXL Magazine saying she shows growth and versatility on the album. Robert Christgau from Vice gave the record a "B+", writing that it "begins with three rather joyful tracks—electric-celeste grindin' pledge 'Desire' to burbling-synth grindin' saga 'Been on My Grind' to—finally, some fun—Big Sean transactional-sex deal 'Back Up.' Then that killjoy Future starts nosing around, and I mean literally, in her pussy, which is as joyful as that one gets. And then comes two pieces of theoretical product".

== Track listing ==
No.	Title	Producer(s)	Length
1.	"Desire"	Izze The Producer	3:40
2.	"Been On My Grind"	Smash David; Go Grizzly	3:56
3.	"Back Up" (featuring Big Sean)	iRocksays	4:01
4.	"Hey There" (featuring Future)	iRocksays, J. Vaughn, The-A-Team	3:33
5.	"Butterflies"	DDS	4:00
6.	"We Winnin'"	Izze The Producer	3:51
Total length:			23:01

== Charts ==
Chart (2015)	Peak position
US Billboard 200	47
US Top R&B/Hip-Hop Albums (Billboard)	8
US Top Rap Albums (Billboard)	6

== Release history ==
Region	Date	Format	Label	Ref
United States	July 31, 2015	Digital download	Columbia; Sony	
