= Sasha Go Hard =

American rapper

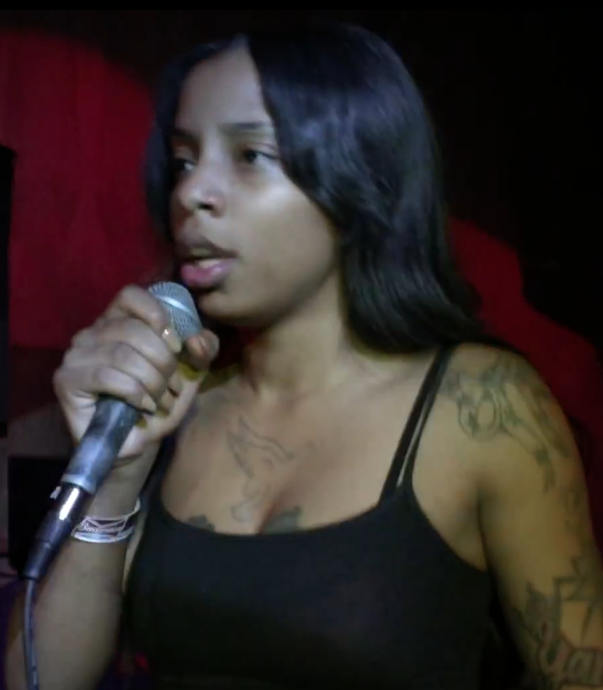
- Sasha Go Hard performing in 2015

Background information
- Born: Yaneisha Franklin; November 8, 1991 (age 35); Chicago, Illinois, U.S.
- Genres: Hip-hop; drill
- Occupations: Rapper; singer; songwriter
- Years active: 2011–present
- Label: Nutty World Entertainment

Yaneisha Franklin (born November 8, 1991), better known by her stage name Sasha Go Hard, is an American rapper and singer.

== Early life ==
Sasha grew up on the south side of Chicago, with her brother and two sisters. She began writing lyrics at age 12, saying “I have always been the type to rhyme, [even] as a child.”

She has stated her musical influences are Lauryn Hill, Trina, Lil’ Kim, and Nicki Minaj.

== Musical career ==
Sasha is one of a small number of young female rappers associated with Chicago’s drill music scene. She has been featured on MTV Sucker Free Chicago, performed at MTV's Sucker Free Chicago Show, made the cover of Chicago's Redeye newspaper, was artist of the week WorldstarHipHop, and Complex magazine. She released a song called "I Ain't No Hitta" with Dreezy in 2012.

Her seventh mixtape, Nutty World 2, was released in April 2015.

The original soundtrack from Spike Lee's 2015 drama Chi-Raq includes the song "Born in Chicago" by Bruce Hornsby and the Noisemakers, which features Sasha Go Hard. She was also featured on Faze Miyake's "Below Me" which was named the 18th best dance remix of 2015 by Spin.

Sasha Go Hard appeared on Insecure's Season 3 Soundtrack with "Golden Pussy", her remix of the lead character's season one rhyme "Broken Pussy".

In 2018, she was featured on the Netflix reality show, Rhythm & Flow, as one of 30 contestants competing for a $250,000 prize and record deal in front of judges Cardi B, Chance The Rapper, and T.I. Although receiving praise from Chicago rappers Chance the Rapper and Twista during her tryout performance, labeled by the two iconic rappers as being the best local rapper in the city, Sasha failed and was sent home during the first challenge along with 15 others. While beginning her verse during a 5-man rap cypher, she stumbled and failed to recover and was the only contestant who didn't spit a single bar.

She wrote and performed the title theme song for the 2019 HBO Max series "South Side" under her birth name Yaneisha Franklin.

== Discography ==
=== Studio albums ===
- 2018: No Problems
- 2020: In Charge
