= From Now On (EP) =

EP by Dreezy
- Released: December 25, 2015
- Recorded: 2014
- Genre: Hip hop
- Length: 17:03
- Label: Interscope
- Producer: Metro Boomin; Southside

Dreezy chronology
Call It What You Want (2015)	From Now On (2015)	No Hard Feelings (2016)

Singles from From Now On
- 1. "Serena" Released: December 25, 2015

From Now On is the second extended play by American rapper Dreezy. It was released December 25, 2015. The entire EP was produced by Metro Boomin and Southside.

== Background ==
In April 2014, she released her remix of YMCMB rapper Nicki Minaj and Lil Herb's "Chiraq" and received general attention, with many fans claiming that it was better than Minaj's version. The remix later garnered her attention and landed her a collaboration with rapper Common on his tenth studio album Nobody's Smiling. In December 2014, it was announced that Sledge signed a recording contract with Interscope Records, who dropped fellow Chicago rapper Chief Keef a few weeks prior. On July 28, 2015, Dreezy released her debut EP titled Call It What You Want. On December 25, 2015, Sledge released another EP titled From Now On to digital retailers and streaming via Interscope Records.

== Track listing ==
- All tracks produced by Metro Boomin and Southside.

No.	Title	Length
1.	"Juice"	3:26
2.	"Money Printer"	3:18
3.	"Serena" (featuring Dej Loaf)	3:53
4.	"Nonstop"	3:14
5.	"From Now On"	3:12
Total length:		17:03

== Charts ==
Chart (2015)	Peak position
US Top Heatseekers	10
