= Lil Durk 2X =

Studio album by Lil Durk (2016)

Studio album by Lil Durk
- Released: July 22, 2016
- Recorded: 2015–16
- Genre: Hip-hop; drill; R&B
- Length: 45:16
- Label: Only the Family; Coke Boys; Def Jam
- Producer: Lil Durk (also exec.); Dontay Banks (exec.); Andrews Bonsu (exec.); Cassius Jay; C-Sick; ChopSquad DJ; Donis Beats; DJ L; Fatman; French Montana; Inomek; Michael Piroli; Sonny Digital; Southside; Wheezy; Young Chop; Zaytoven

Lil Durk chronology
Remember My Name (2015)	Lil Durk 2X (2016)	They Forgot (2016)

Deluxe edition cover

Singles from Lil Durk 2X
- 1. "My Beyoncé" Released: November 9, 2015; 2. "She Just Wanna" Released: May 24, 2016; 3. "Money Walk" Released: June 16, 2016; 4. "True" Released: July 8, 2016

Lil Durk 2X is the second studio album by American rapper Lil Durk. It was released on July 22, 2016, by Only the Family and Def Jam Recordings, his final release under the latter label. Following the release of Durk's debut album, Remember My Name (2015), after suffering numerous delays. The production on the album was handled by C-Sick, DJ L, Wheezy, Sonny Digital, ChopSquad DJ, Southside, Young Chop and Zaytoven, among others. The standard edition of the album features guest appearances from Young Thug, Ty Dolla Sign, Yo Gotti and Dej Loaf while the deluxe edition adds additional guest appearances from Future and Kid Ink.

== Background ==
In 2016, Durk announced that his next project would be his forthcoming mixtape called Lil Durk 2X, and it would be released on May 1, 2016. Durk then stated that the mixtape would have to be his second album, and this project has later been slated for a June 24, 2016 release. However, the album has been changed and slated for the July 22, 2016 release. The OTF frontman moved approximately 7,745 physical copies of his latest project, combined with streaming sales, amounts to a total of 12,259 units.

Singles

Lil Durk 2X spawned four singles, with all four singles being released prior to the album. The lead single from the album, “My Beyoncé”, features Dej Loaf and was released on November 9, 2015.

”She Just Wanna”, the second single from the album was released on May 24, 2016 and features Ty Dolla Sign. “Money Walk” was released as the albums third single, being released on June 16, 2016 and featuring a verse from Yo Gotti.

The final single released from Lil Durk 2X was released on July 8, 2016, and was “True”. “True” was also the only solo single released from the album.

== Track listing ==
No.	Title	Writer(s)	Producer(s)	Length
1.	"Check"	Durk Banks; Wesley Glass	Wheezy	4:37
2.	"LilDurk2x"	Banks; Joshua Cross; Xavier Dotson	Cassius Jay; Zaytoven	3:12
3.	"So What" (featuring Young Thug)	Banks; Adonis Amos-Staton; Jeffery Williams	Donis Beats	3:10
4.	"She Just Wanna" (featuring Ty Dolla Sign)	Banks; Darrell Jackson; Darrius Luckett; Tyrone Griffin, Jr.	ChopSquad DJ	3:37
5.	"Money Walk" (featuring Yo Gotti)	Banks; Amos-Staton; Michael Piroli; Mario Mims	Donis Beats; Piroli	3:15
6.	"Glock Up"	Banks; Londen Buckner	DJ L	3:01
7.	"Rich Nigga"	Banks; Kemoni Watts	Inomek	3:18
8.	"True"	Banks; Sonny Uwaezuoke	Sonny Digital	3:09
9.	"Set It Off"	Banks; Jackson	ChopSquad DJ	3:17
10.	"Super Powers"	Banks; Adam Woods; Tyree Pittman	Young Chop; Fatman^{[a]}	4:08
11.	"My Beyoncé" (featuring Dej Loaf)	Banks; Charles Dumazer; Deja Trimble	C-Sick	4:39
Total length:				39:23

Deluxe edition (bonus tracks)
No.	Title	Writer(s)	Producer(s)	Length
12.	"Hated on Me" (featuring Future)	Banks; Joshua Luellen; Nayvadius Wilburn	Southside	3:00
13.	"Make It Back"	Banks; Watts	Inomek	2:53
14.	"Good Good" (featuring Kid Ink and Dej Loaf)	Banks; Jackson; Trimble; Brian Todd Collins	Chopsquad DJ	4:50
Total length:				45:16

Notes

- ^{^[a]} signifies an uncredited co-producer

== Charts ==
Chart (2016)	Peak position
US Billboard 200	29
US Top R&B/Hip-Hop Albums (Billboard)	5
