= My Beyoncé =

2015 single by Lil Durk featuring Dej Loaf

Single by Lil Durk featuring Dej Loaf

from the album 300 Days, 300 Nights and Lil Durk 2X
- Released: November 9, 2015
- Length: 4:39
- Label: Def Jam
- Songwriters: Durk Banks; Deja Trimble; Charles Dumazer
- Producer: C-Sick

Lil Durk singles chronology
"On Me" (2015)	"My Beyoncé" (2015)	"Industry" (2015)

Dej Loaf singles chronology
"All Said and Done" (2015)	"My Beyoncé" (2015)	"Til the Morning" (2015)

Music video
- "My Beyoncé" on YouTube

"My Beyoncé" is a song by American rapper Lil Durk featuring fellow American rapper Dej Loaf, released on November 9, 2015, as a single. It appears on Durk's mixtape 300 Days, 300 Nights (2015) and his second studio album Lil Durk 2X (2016). The song was produced by C-Sick.

== Background ==
In October 2015, the song was previewed in a profile of producer No I.D.

== Composition ==
Meaghan Garvey of Pitchfork called the song "a Midwestern rap romance averse to gooey histrionics, where being ride-or-die is not so much a glamorous choice but a given." Lil Durk and Dej Loaf take the role of a couple in love; in Auto-Tuned vocals, Durk professes his "devotion and infatuation" for Loaf, whom he calls his "Beyoncé", singing, "Ooh I like the way she move / Shawty my baby, my everything, she the truth". Loaf also expresses her love, singing, "Leave your girl, be through with that / Get with DeJ, he ain't never going back" and "Durk and Dej, I'm thinking about changing my last name".

== Music video ==
A music video for the song was released on January 11, 2016. It features Lil Durk and Dej Loaf at a basketball court, where they rap and shoot hoops.

== Charts ==
Chart (2016)	Peak position
US Bubbling Under Hot 100 (Billboard)	3
US Hot R&B/Hip-Hop Songs (Billboard)	32

== Certifications ==
Region	Certification	Certified units/sales
United States (RIAA)	Platinum	1,000,000^{‡}
^{‡} Sales+streaming figures based on certification alone.
