= Body (Dreezy song) =

Single by Dreezy featuring Jeremih

from the album No Hard Feelings
- Released: January 23, 2016
- Length: 3:52
- Label: Interscope
- Songwriters: Seandrea Sledge; Brittany Hazzard; Michael Tucker; Jeremy Felton
- Producer: BloodPop

Dreezy singles chronology
"Serena" (2015)	"Body" (2016)	"We Gon Ride" (2016)

Jeremih singles chronology
"Somewhere in Paradise" (2015)	"Body" (2016)	"What a Night" (2016)

Music video
- "Body" on YouTube

"Body" is a song by American rapper and singer Dreezy, released on January 23, 2016 as the lead single from her debut studio album No Hard Feelings (2016). The song features American singer Jeremih and was produced by BloodPop.

== Composition ==
The song contains a mixture of hip hop and R&B elements, with metaphors of violence while sex is being described in the lyrics; Dreezy uses the idiom "catch a body", a slang phrase meaning to murder, but instead referring to finding company and attraction. Jeremih also adds a few analogies of guns.

== Music video ==
A music video for the song was released on May 13, 2016, via MTV Jams. Directed by Erik White, the video shows Dreezy and Jeremih at a house party, before they drive off together.

== Charts ==
=== Weekly charts ===
Chart (2016)	Peak position
US Billboard Hot 100	62
US Hot R&B/Hip-Hop Songs (Billboard)	20
US Rhythmic Airplay (Billboard)	19

=== Year-end charts ===
Chart (2016)	Position
US Hot R&B/Hip-Hop Songs (Billboard)	63

== Certifications ==
Region	Certification	Certified units/sales
New Zealand (RMNZ)	Gold	15,000^{‡}
United States (RIAA)	Platinum	1,000,000^{‡}
^{‡} Sales+streaming figures based on certification alone.
