= Greg Neri =

American author

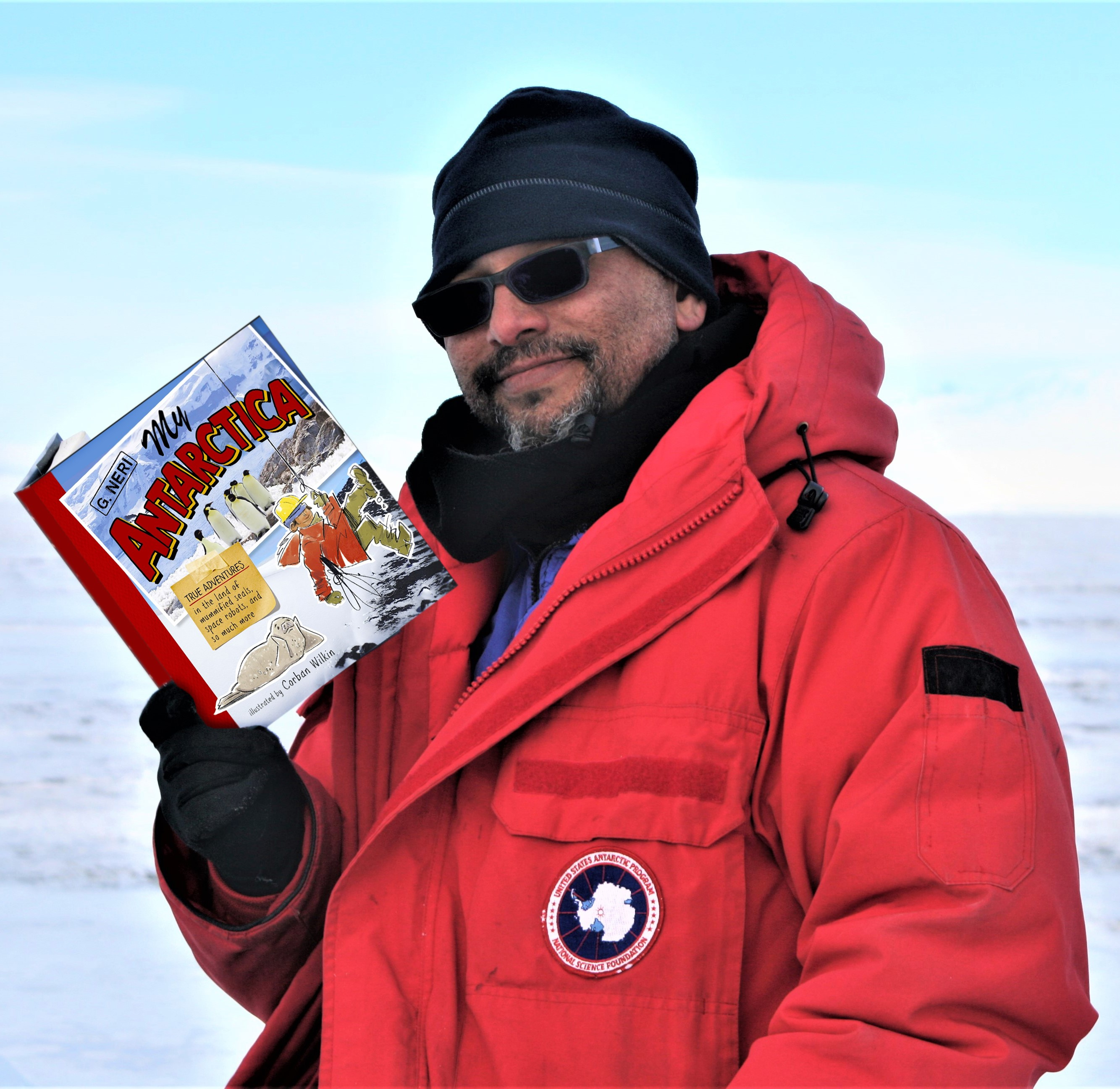
- Greg Neri in 2017
- Education: University of California, Santa Cruz
- Occupation: Writer
- Writing career
- Pen name: G. Neri
- Notable works: Yummy, Ghetto Cowboy, Tru & Nelle, My Antarctica
- Website: www.gneri.com

Greg Neri (pen name G. Neri) is an American author and is known for his work in young adult fiction. He has written books in free verse and novelistic prose, as well as graphic novels and non-fiction. He has written 16 books for young people. Neri is the winner of the Michael L. Printz award, the ALA/SLJ Young Adult Literary Award, and a Coretta Scott King honor, as well as being honored by the Simon Wiesenthal Center and the International Reading Association.

== Personal life and education ==
Greg Neri was raised in Los Angeles, California. He moved to Santa Cruz, California, to attend the University of California, Santa Cruz. In 2001, he illustrated his first book for Scholastic, but turned to writing in 2005. In 2017, he went to Antarctica on a grant from the National Science Foundation. In 2023, he was given an honorary doctorate for his literary output and polar science outreach from the State University of New York (SUNY). He currently resides in Tampa, Florida with his wife Maggie.

== Books ==
Neri's 2007 first novel, Chess Rumble, is about an 11-year-old inner-city teen named Marcus who fights back against his bully, but is challenged by a chess master to fight his battles on the chessboard instead. Chess Rumble received praise from critics and bloggers. School Library Journal said "This book will become a standby pick for reluctant readers, who will be pulled in before they know it by the story’s quick pace and the authenticity of Marcus’s voice and experience.” The book was named a Notable Book by the American Library Association, the International Reading Association, and the National Council of Teachers of English. In 2010, Neri received the Lee Bennett Hopkins Promising Poet Award from the International Reading Association for his free-verse on Chess Rumble.

Neri's first novel, Surf Mules, revolves around two California surfers who find themselves embroiled in a world of disorganized crime. Publishers Weekly called it "Poignant and heartbreaking."

Neri's graphic novel Yummy: the Last Days of a Southside Shorty is about Robert "Yummy" Sandifer, who was eleven years old in 1994 when he became a fugitive from justice after accidentally killing a neighbor girl, before being killed by the gang he was in. The book won a Coretta Scott King honor, and was honored by the Simon Wiesenthal Center and the Museum of Tolerance. It was named one of the best graphic novels for all ages by CNN and Flavorwire.

His novel Ghetto Cowboy is inspired by the real-life black urban cowboys in North Philadelphia. The story is about an 11-year-old named Cole, who is abandoned on the doorstep of the father he's never met, but befriends a horse and eventually becomes a cowboy. Neri has said he was inspired by an article in Life magazine. The Christian Science Monitor praised the book. In 2021 the novel was adapted into a motion picture for Netflix called Concrete Cowboy, starring Idris Elba and Caleb Mclaughlin.

Knockout Games is based on the real-life origins of the infamous knockout games in St. Louis of recent years. The story concerns a white girl who falls in with a group of middle graders and high schoolers who play the dreaded game. Kirkus Reviews gave it a starred review, saying: "The results are thrilling... Harsh and relentless, a tough but worthy read."

Neri's first picture book and biography charted the rags to riches rise of Johnny Cash. Kirkus Reviews, School Library Journal and Booklist gave it starred reviews.

A second musical biography, about the childhood friendship of Simon and Garfunkel followed, called When Paulie Met Artie. Kirkus said, "Music lovers and fans will delight in sharing this book with young family and friends... Part nostalgia, part history, and all tuneful."

Neri's middle grade novel, Tru & Nelle is a detective story starring Harper Lee and Truman Capote as children growing up in the Deep South during the Depression. In a starred review, Kirkus said, "An engaging portrait of two children’s authors before they became famous." A sequel, A Christmas Tale, came out the following year, exploring their teenage years. In a starred review, Kirkus said, "An absorbing story of true friends in troubled times."

In 2018, Neri wrote Grand Theft Horse, a graphic novel biography of his cousin, the horse trainer Gail Ruffu, who stole a racehorse to save its life. School Library Journal said, “VERDICT: Superb. Ruffu’s tenacity and the book’s satisfying conclusion will appeal to fans of the “March” trilogy.”

In 2020, his book Ghetto Cowboy was adapted into the Netflix film, Concrete Cowboy, starring Idris Elba and Caleb McLaughlin. He served as Executive Producer. The film debuted at #1 over Easter weekend, 2021. Variety called it a "Masterful Father-Son Drama." A novel sequel, Polo Cowboy, came out the following year.

2024 saw the release of his multiple starred-reviewed books, My Antarctica (a travel memoir about his time in Antarctica), and Safe Passage (a follow-up to his graphic novel, Yummy), as well as a Michael L. Printz award for his contribution to the anthology, The Collectors: Stories.

2026 saw the release of his second travel memoir for kids, My Bicentennial Summer, based on an epic road trip he took with his family as a kid, where they drove 8,000 miles around the country during the Bicentennial in search of the ideals of America.

== Writing approach ==
Neri has been asked about what themes he writes about and for whom. He has said that "I'm trying to re-think the notion of what a book means to urban teens. Many teens can make it through high school without ever having read a book of fiction. But that's because to them, books are big, full of words, and told in a voice that is alien to them. Most of these kids are now born into a more visual society, so I think playing with graphic novels and illustrations and using voices and characters that you don't see often in literature is a big plus for reluctant readers in the city. I see my books as gateway books to Jane Austen."

== Publications ==
=== Novels ===
- Surf Mules (Carolrhoda Lab, 2009) ISBN 0-399-25086-7
- Ghetto Cowboy (Candlewick, 2011) ISBN 978-0-7636-4922-7
- Knockout Games (Carolrhoda Lab, 2014) ISBN 978-1467732697
- Polo Cowboy (Candlewick, 2021) ISBN 978-1536233070
- Tru & Nelle (HMH, 2016) ISBN 978-1328740953
- Tru & Nelle: A Christmas Tale (HMH 2017) ISBN 978-1328685988

=== Graphic novels ===
- Yummy: the Last Days of a Southside Shorty (Lee and Low, 2010) ISBN 978-1-58430-267-4
- Grand Theft Horse (Tu, 2018) ISBN 978-1-62014-855-6
- The Time Traveling Dino Detectives of Antarctica (Ice Boy Comics, 2020) ISBN 9780578624730
- Safe Passage (Lee and Low, 2023) ISBN 978-1643790343

=== Free-verse novellas/ Picture books ===
- Chess Rumble (Lee and Low, 2007) ISBN 978-1-58430-279-7
- Hello, I'm Johnny Cash (Candlewick, 2014) ISBN 978-0763662455
- When Paulie Met Artie (Candlewick, 2018) ISBN 978-0763681746
- Christo and Jeanne-Claude Wrap the World (Candlewick, 2023) ISBN 978-1536216615
- My Antarctica (Candlewick, 2024) ISBN 978-1536223323
- My Bicentennial Summer (Candlewick, 2026) ISBN 978-1536239577

=== Anthologies ===
- Who Done It (Soho Teen, 2013) ISBN 978-1616951528
- Open Mic (Candlewick, 2016) ISBN 978-0763690953
- Traveling the Blue Road, Poems of the Sea (Seagrass Press, 2017) ISBN 978-1633222762
- I Remember: Poems and Pictures of Heritage (Lee and Low, 2019) ISBN 978-1620143117
- No Voice too Small (Charles Bridge, 2020) ISBN 978-1623541316
- The Collectors: Stories (Dutton, 2023) ISBN 978-0593620281

=== Easy Readers (as illustrator) ===
- Hooray for Teeth by Gina Shaw (Scholastic, 2001) ISBN 978-0-439-20642-6)
