= Grand Theft Horse =

2018 graphic novel by Greg Neri

Grand Theft Horsee
- Author: G. Neri
- Illustrator: Corban Wilkin
- Language: English
- Publisher: Lee & Low Books
- Publication date: September 25, 2018
- Media type: Print (Paperback and Hardback)
- ISBN: 9781620148556

Grand Theft Horse is a 2018 graphic novel written by Greg Neri and illustrated by Corban Wilkin. The book is published by Lee & Low and is a biography of the horse trainer, Gail Ruffu.

== About ==
Grand Theft Horse tells the story of the life of Gail Ruffu and especially chronicles the events surrounding the theft or rescue of the racehorse, Urgent Envoy. Ruffu was worried that Urgent Envoy would be killed if he was raced again. She decided to take him away on Christmas Eve. The author, Greg Neri, focuses on the drama surrounding the possible injury to a beloved horse. Illustrations in pen and ink by Corban Wilkin are described as "balancing realism with gently rounded and slightly exaggerated features that foreground emotional stakes," according to Booklist. Publishers Weekly compares the illustration style Wilkin used in Grand Theft Horse to Will Eisner's work.

The book includes photographs of Ruffu at the end of the story and also includes her "personal plea for reforms in the horse-racing industry." It is written for middle school and high school readers.

In 2019, Booklist named Grand Theft Horse as one of its "Top 10 Biographies for Youth" for the year.

== Reviews ==
Horn Book Magazine wrote, "Intense and candid, the story underscores the risks and rewards of uncompromised activism." ForeWord Reviews calls the book "an inspirational tale, demonstrating the universal moral of standing up for one's beliefs, even if there's a steep price."
