= Best Shot in the West =

2012 graphic novel by Patricia and Fredrick McKissack

Best Shot in the West: The Adventures of Nat Love
- Authors: Patricia McKissack, Fredrick McKissack
- Illustrator: Randy DuBurke
- Language: English
- Subject: Children's literature, Graphic novel, American history, Cowboys
- Published: 2012 (Holt)
- Publication place: United States
- Media type: Print (hardback, paperback)
- Pages: 129
- ISBN: 9780811857499
- OCLC: 973527748

Best Shot in the West: The Adventures of Nat Love is a 2012 graphic novel written by Patricia and Fredrick McKissack and illustrated by Randy DuBurke. It is about the life of African-American cowboy Nat Love.

== Reception ==
Booklist, reviewing Best Shot in the West, wrote "The writing makes little use of hyperbole, allowing the natural drama of horse-roping contests, a kidnapping by a Native American tribe, and driving cattle through a fierce lightning storm to hold readers' attention. .. The unique art fills highly realistic figures (some even seem to be taken from old photos) and backgrounds with sprays of grainy color that make the story seem like it's coated in a patina of genuine history." and the School Library Journal wrote "Exciting and picturesque, Nat Love's life makes for a great graphic novel."

Best Shot in the West has also been reviewed by The Horn Book Magazine, Library Media Connection, Voice of Youth Advocates, Publishers Weekly, Kirkus Reviews, and the Tennessee Tribune.

It is a 2012 BCCB Blue Ribbon Book, and a 2013 Bank Street CBC Best Children's Book of the Year.
