= Dreezy =

American rapper

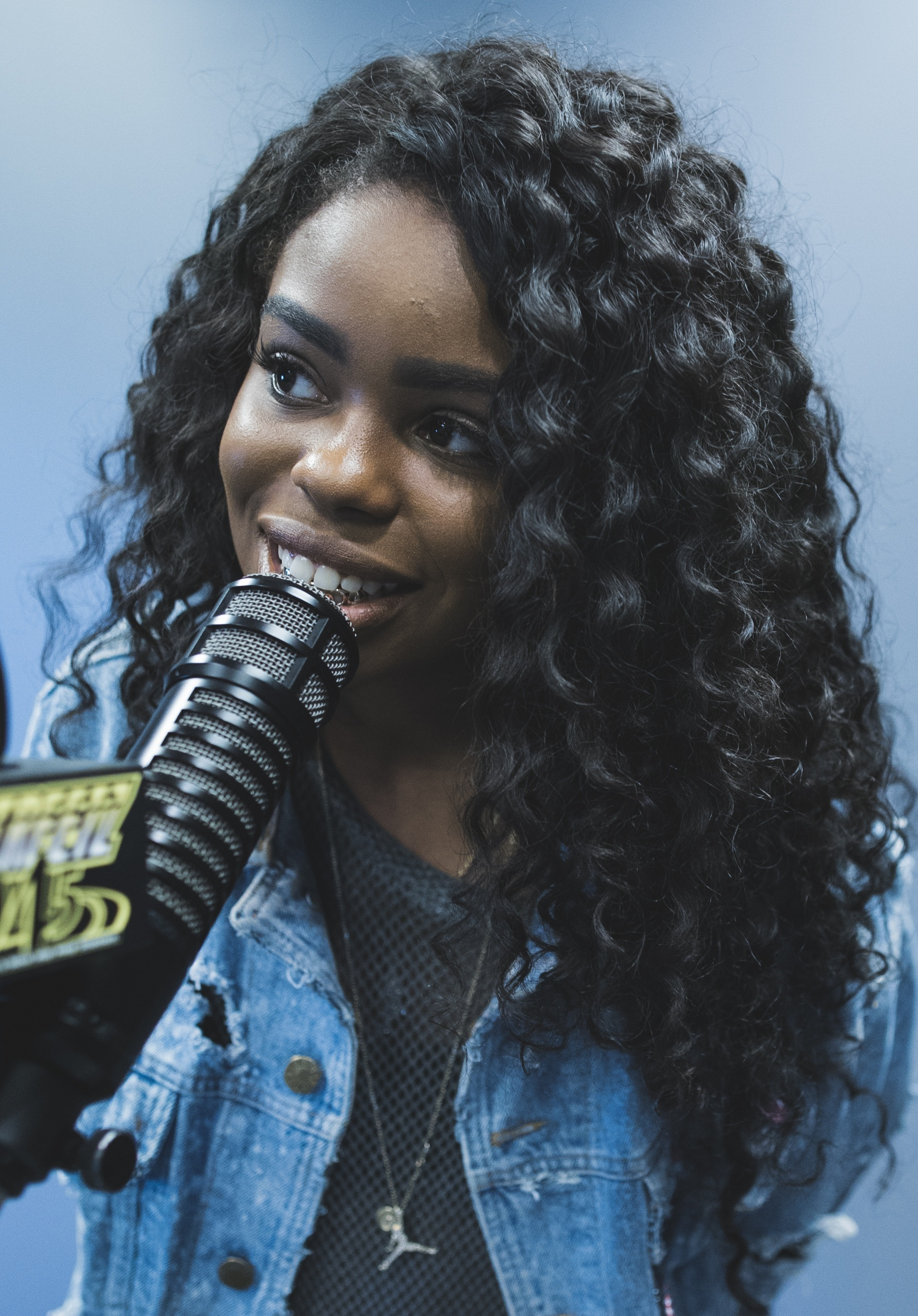
- Dreezy in July 2016

Background information
- Born: Seandrea Sledge; March 28, 1994 (age 32); Chicago, Illinois, U.S.
- Genres: Midwestern hip-hop; R&B; pop; trap
- Occupations: Rapper; singer; songwriter
- Years active: 2012–present
- Labels: Interscope; AOE

Seandrea Sledge (born March 28, 1994), better known by her stage name Dreezy, is an American rapper, singer, and songwriter. Hailing from Chicago, she signed with Interscope Records in 2014. The label released her debut studio album, No Hard Feelings (2016), as well as its follow-up, Big Dreez (2019). In 2020, she split from the label and released Hitgirl (2022), a collaboration album with Hit-Boy.

== Early life ==
Sledge was born and raised on the South Side of Chicago, Illinois. Throughout her childhood, Sledge moved to a number of locations throughout the city of Chicago. To escape personal issues Sledge looked into the fine arts. She explored scatting, poetry writing, and drifted towards singing at the age of 10. Sledge always felt like music was her internal escapism, and by the age of 14, she found interest in becoming a rapper. Sledge has cited rappers J. Cole and Lil Wayne as her biggest musical influences, referring to the former as her favorite rapper of all time.

== Career ==
=== 2012–2013: Early beginnings ===
As Dreezy was putting more time into rapping, she became good friends with fellow Chicago native rapper Sasha Go Hard, and made a guest appearance on Sasha's song "I Ain't No Hitta" in 2012. Dreezy later released a song with a fellow rapper Lil Durk, called "Ghost". In February 2013, Dreezy released a collaborative mixtape with fellow Chicago native rapper Mikey Dollaz, titled Business N Pleasure. In February 2014, she released her first solo mixtape, titled Schizo through AOE Music, along with a song, which features guest verse from a fellow Chicago rapper Common, called "No Good".

=== 2014–2019: Signing to Interscope Records and No Hard Feelings ===
In April 2014, she released her remix of rappers Nicki Minaj and Lil Herb's "Chiraq" and received general attention, with many fans claiming that it was better than Minaj's version. The remix later garnered her attention and landed her a collaboration with rapper Common on his tenth studio album Nobody's Smiling. In 2014, she was named as the "Princess of Chicago Rap" by Noisey via Vice. In December 2014, it was announced that Dreezy signed a recording contract with Interscope Records.

On July 28, 2015, Dreezy released her debut EP titled Call It What You Want. On December 25, 2015, Dreezy released another EP titled From Now On to digital retailers and streaming via Interscope Records. In January 2016, Dreezy released single "Body" which became her first single to enter the Billboard Hot 100 and later peaked at number 62. Her debut album, No Hard Feelings, was released on July 15, 2016.

In 2018, she performed at Rolling Loud. In January 2019, she released her second studio album Big Dreez. She appeared in the Netflix film Beats as Queen Cabrini.

=== 2020–present: Going independent ===
In 2020, she split from Interscope Records and went independent.

On May 11, 2022, Dreezy released the song "Balance My Lows" featuring rapper Coi Leray. It is the lead single from her collaborative album with American record producer Hit-Boy, Hitgirl, which was then released on May 20, 2022.

== Discography ==
=== Studio albums ===
List of albums, with selected chart positions
Title	Album details	Peak chart positions		
Title	Album details	US	US R&B	US Rap
No Hard Feelings	Released: July 15, 2016; Label: Interscope; Format: CD, LP, digital download	101	15	11

=== Collaboration albums ===
Title	Album details
Hitgirl (with Hit-Boy)	Released: May 20, 2022; Label: Dreezy Sound Inc., Empire; Format: Digital download

=== Extended plays ===
List of extended plays, with selected chart positions
Title	Album details	Peak chart positions	
Title	Album details	US Heat	US South
Call It What You Want	Released: July 28, 2015; Label: Interscope; Format: Digital download	—	—
From Now On	Released: December 25, 2015; Label: Interscope; Format: Digital download	10	10

=== Mixtapes ===
Title	Album details
The Illustration	Released: April 27, 2012; Label: Self-released; Format: Digital download
Business N Pleasure (with Mikey Dollaz)	Released: February 14, 2013; Label: Self-released; Format: Digital Download
D.S.M (Schizo Pre-tape)	Released: August 13, 2013; Label: Self-released; Format: Digital download
Schizo	Released: February 24, 2014; Label: AOE Music; Format: CD, digital download
Big Dreez	Released: January 25, 2019; Label: Interscope; Format: Digital download

=== Singles ===
==== As lead artist ====
List of singles as lead artist, with selected chart positions and certifications, showing year released and album name
Title	Year	Peak chart positions				Certifications	Album
Title	Year	US	US R&B/HH	US R&B	US Rhythm	Certifications	Album
"Ghost" (featuring Lil Durk)	2012	—	—	—	—		non-album-singles
"I Love That Bitch"	2013	—	—	—	—		D.S.M (Schizo Pre-Tape)
"Zero" (featuring Sasha Go Hard and Katie Got Bandz)	2014	—	—	—	—		Schizo
"No Good" (featuring Common and Ross Augusta)	2014	—	—	—	—		Schizo
"Serena" (featuring Dej Loaf)	2015	—	—	—	—		From Now On
"Body" (featuring Jeremih)	2016	62	20	8	32	RIAA: Platinum	No Hard Feelings
"We Gon Ride" (featuring Gucci Mane)	2016	—	—	—	—		No Hard Feelings
"Close to You" (featuring T-Pain)	2016	—	— (Note: "Close to You" did not enter the US R&B/Hip-Hop songs chart, but peaked at number 29 on the R&B/Hip-Hop Airplay songs chart.)	—	—	RIAA: Gold	No Hard Feelings
"Spazz"	2016	—	—	—	—		No Hard Feelings
"Wasted"	2016	—	— (Note: "Wasted" did not enter the R&B/Hip-Hop songs chart, but peaked at number 30 on the R&B/Hip-Hop Airplay songs chart.)	—	—		No Hard Feelings
"F.D.N"	2017	—	—	—	—		non-album-singles
"Spar" (featuring 6lack and Kodak Black)	2017	—	—	—	—		non-album-singles
"Can't Trust a Soul" (featuring PnB Rock)	2017	—	—	—	—		non-album-singles
"2nd to None" (with 2 Chainz)	2018	—	—	—	—		non-album-singles
"Where Them $ @"	2018	—	—	—	—		Big Dreez
"Chanel Slides" (featuring Kash Doll)	2018	—	—	—	—		Big Dreez
"RIP Aretha"	2019	—	—	—	—		Big Dreez
"They Not Ready"	2022	—	—	—	—		Hitgirl
"Balance My Lows" (featuring Coi Leray)	2022	—	—	—	—		Hitgirl

==== As featured artist ====
List of singles as lead artist, with selected chart positions and certifications, showing year released and album name
Title	Year	Peak chart positions				Certifications	Album
Title	Year	US	US R&B/HH	US R&B	US Rhythm	Certifications	Album
"Mean What I Mean" (AlunaGeorge featuring Leikeli47 and Dreezy)	2016	—	—	—	—		I Remember
"Got Me F*cked Up" (Keke Palmer featuring Dreezy)	2016	—	—	—	—		Lauren
"Come With Me" (YFN Lucci featuring Dreezy)	2018	—	—	—	—		Ray Ray from Summerhill
"Actin' Different" (Derez De'Shon featuring Dreezy)	2018	—	—	—	—		Pain 2
"Got Me" (Dreamville featuring Ari Lennox, Omen, Ty Dolla Sign, and Dreezy)	2019	—	—	—	—		Revenge of the Dreamers III
"Mad At You" (King Von featuring Dreezy)	2020	—	—	—	—		Welcome to O'Block
"Hard To Trust" (King Von featuring Dreezy)	2022	—	—	—	—		What It Means to Be King
"Yea Yea" (Lady London featuring Dreezy)	2023	—	—	—	—		S.O.U.L.

== Filmography ==
=== Film ===
Year	Film	Role			
Year	Film	Role	2019	Beats	Queen Cabrini

== Awards and nominations ==
Year	Award	Nominee	Category	Result	Ref.
2017	IHeartRadio Music Awards	Herself	Best New R&B Artist	Nominated	
2022	Grammy Awards	Back of My Mind (as songwriter)	Album of the Year	Nominated	
