= Me U & Hennessy =

Single by Dej Loaf featuring Lil Wayne
- Released: April 20, 2015
- Recorded: 2015
- Genre: Hip hop
- Length: 3:48
- Label: Columbia
- Songwriter: Deja Trimble

Dej Loaf singles chronology
"Be Real" (2015)	"Me U & Hennessy" (2015)	"Ryda" (2015)

"Me U & Hennessy" is a song by American hip hop recording artist Dej Loaf. The song was released on April 20, 2015 by Columbia Records. The official remix features American rapper Lil Wayne.

== Music video ==
The music video for "Me U & Hennessy" was released on April 17, 2015.

== Commercial performance ==
"Me U & Hennessy" peaked at number six on the U.S. Bubbling Under Hot 100 chart. The song also reached number 38 on the Hot R&B/Hip-Hop Songs chart.

== Charts ==
Chart (2015)	Peak position
US Bubbling Under Hot 100 Singles (Billboard)	6
US Hot R&B/Hip-Hop Songs (Billboard)	38
