= B.E.D. (song) =

2016 single by Jacquees

Single by Jacquees

from the album Mood and 4275
- Released: July 8, 2016
- Genre: R&B, trap
- Length: 3:56
- Label: Cash Money
- Songwriters: Rodriquez Broadnax; Myron Avant; Mbeng Denzel Ayuk-Okata; Steve Huff
- Producer: Nash B

Jacquees singles chronology
"Pull Up" (2016)	"B.E.D." (2016)	"Gangsta" (2016)

Music video
- "BED" on YouTube

"B.E.D." is a song by American singer Jacquees. It was first released on January 25, 2016, from his mixtape Mood, before being released as a single on July 8, 2016. It is the lead single from his debut studio album 4275 (2018). The song was a sleeper hit, and is considered Jacquees' breakout song.

== Composition ==
The song samples the bridge of "Read Your Mind" by Avant in the chorus. It has been described as a "effectively erotic track" with a "sung/rapped hybrid".

== Remix ==
The official remix of the song features American singer Ty Dolla Sign and American rapper Quavo. Also titled "B.E.D. (Part 2)", it was released on January 25, 2017. A music video for the remix was released on August 17, 2017.

== Live performances ==
Jacquees performed the song at the 2018 Soul Train Music Awards.

== Charts ==
Chart performance for "B.E.D."
Chart (2017)	Peak position
US Billboard Hot 100	69
US Hot R&B/Hip-Hop Songs (Billboard)	30

== Certifications ==
Region	Certification	Certified units/sales
United States (RIAA)	4× Platinum	4,000,000^{‡}
^{‡} Sales+streaming figures based on certification alone.
