= 4275 =

Studio album by Jacquees
- Released: June 15, 2018
- Recorded: 2014–2018
- Genre: R&B; hip hop
- Length: 64:10
- Label: Cash Money; Republic
- Producer: Anthony Bailey; DJ Spinz; Donald Hazel Sales; Donell Jones; Exotic Muzik; ForteBowie; Inkwell Music Group; Johnathan Wells; K-Major; London on da Track; Murphy Kid; Nash B; OG Parker; Obi Ebele; Robert Moore; T Moody; Uche Ebele; Xeryus G; XL Eagle

Jacquees chronology
4275 (2018)	King of R&B (2019)

Singles from 4275
- 1. "B.E.D." Released: July 8, 2016; 2. "Inside" Released: May 18, 2018; 3. "You" Released: July 24, 2018

Professional ratings
Review scores
Source	Rating
HipHopDX	3.9/5
Pitchfork	6.9/10

4275 is the debut studio album by American singer-songwriter Jacquees. It was released on June 15, 2018, by Cash Money Records. It features guest appearances from Birdman, Trey Songz, Chris Brown, Dej Loaf and Young Thug, among others.

== Background ==
Jacquees first announced the album through his Instagram page on May 15, 2018. The album's second single, "Inside" featuring Trey Songz, was released on May 18. The album's third single, "You", was released on September 7.

== Track listing ==
Credits adapted from Tidal.

No.	Title	Writer(s)	Producer(s)	Length
1.	"Rodriquez Jacquees Broadnax (Intro)"	Rodriquez Broadnax; Kelvin Brown	Nash B	1:36
2.	"4275" (featuring Birdman and Jermaine Dupri)	Broadnax; Bryan Williams; Jermaine Dupri; Brown; Gary Hill; Denzel Ayuk	Nash B; DJ Spinz	4:00
3.	"I Know Better"	Broadnax; Cameron Murphy; Kendricke Brown	Murphy Kid; K-Major^{[a]}	2:54
4.	"23"	Broadnax; Donell Jones	Jones	4:33
5.	"B.E.D."	Broadnax; Brown; Ricki Glass; Myron Avant; Steve Huff	Nash B	3:56
6.	"Studio" (featuring Young Thug)	Broadnax; Jeffery Williams; Brown; Hill; Johnathan Wells; Brown; Ayuk	Nash B; DJ Spinz; Wells; K-Major^{[a]}	4:21
7.	"Beauty Doesn't Cry"	Broadnax; Brown; Brown; Phillip Greene	Nash B; K-Major	3:58
8.	"No Validation"	Broadnax; Joshua Parker; Xeryus Gittens; Ayuk	OG Parker; Xeryus G	3:12
9.	"Inside" (featuring Trey Songz)	Broadnax; Tremaine Neverson; Ayuk	ForteBowie	4:08
10.	"London"	Broadnax; Brown	Nash B	4:46
11.	"All About Us"	Broadnax; Brown	Nash B	3:01
12.	"All My Life" (featuring Chris Brown)	Broadnax; Christopher Brown; Andre Giles; Zachary Maxery; Donald Hazel Sales	Obi Ebele; Uche Ebele; Sales^{[a]}	3:21
13.	"House or Hotel"	Broadnax; Trevon Campbell	XL Eagle	3:37
14.	"Play the Field"	Broadnax; Wayne Thomas; Anthony Bailey	Inkwell Music Group; Bailey^{[a]}	2:53
15.	"Infatuated" (featuring LaTocha Scott)	Broadnax; LaTocha Scott; Thomas; Robert Moore	Inkwell Music Group; Moore^{[a]}	4:04
16.	"Whateva You Into"	Broadnax; Parker; Gittens	OG Parker; Xeryus G	2:41
17.	"Red Light" (featuring Dej Loaf)	Broadnax; Deja Trimble; Tevin Thompson	Exotic Muzik	3:53
18.	"Special" (featuring Jagged Edge)	Broadnax; Brian Casey; Brandon Casey; Thomas; Terrance Pickett	Inkwell Music Group; T Moody	3:15
Total length:				64:10

Bonus track version
No.	Title	Writer(s)	Producer(s)	Length
19.	"You"	Broadnax; Tyler Holmes; Cassius Clay; Jocelyn Adriene Donald	London on da Track	3:37
Total length:				67:47

Notes

- ^{^[a]} signifies a co-producer.
- "All About Us" features additional vocals from Nyielle Hansley, Tyler Ragin, Tobias Douthit and Cherish Douglass.

== Charts ==
Chart (2018)	Peak position
US Billboard 200	35
US Top R&B/Hip-Hop Albums (Billboard)	15

== Certifications ==
Region	Certification	Certified units/sales
United States (RIAA)	Gold	500,000^{‡}
^{‡} Sales+streaming figures based on certification alone.
