= Lauren (EP) =

EP by Keke Palmer
- Released: November 4, 2016
- Genre: R&B
- Length: 17:11
- Label: Island
- Producers: Sean Garrett (also exec.); Dopant Beats; Andre Atkinson; Trionomics; A&R Christopher Young (Sacrifice Management)

Keke Palmer chronology
Waited to Exhale (2016)	Lauren (2016)	KeyanaNikole (2017)

Lauren is the second extended play (EP) by the American recording artist Keke Palmer. It was released on November 4, 2016, through Island Records.

== Background and release ==
On 4 November 2016, Palmer released a 17-minute short film of the same name, which was premiered on Billboard's website and included an interview describing the recording process and what the EP was about.

== Critical reception ==
Billboard gave a positive review and remarked on the versatility of the tracks, stating, "[she] hones into her musical talents and offers up her vulnerable side on tracks like "Doubtful" and "Pressure." She also hits the ladies with the partystarter "Got Me F--ked Up" and flaunts her flawlessness as an African queen for "Hands Free."" Rap-Up also praised the EP, and noted, "over 16 minutes, the multi-faceted star delivers banger after banger through various moods and themes. From the opening scene, in which Keke encourages listeners to believe in themselves, Palmer sets the tone for an artistic journey that includes documentary-style vignettes."

== Commercial performance ==
On 26 November 2016, "Lauren" debuted at number 18 on the Billboard R&B Albums chart, number 42 on the Top R&B/Hip-Hop Albums chart and number 22 on the Heatseekers albums chart.

== Track listing ==
No.	Title	Writer(s)	Producer(s)	Length
1.	"Doubtful"	Sean Garrett; Evan Turner	Garrett; Dopant Beats^{[a]}	3:03
2.	"Got Me Fucked Up" (featuring Dreezy)	Andre Atkinson; Garrett; Seandrea Sledge	Garrett; Atkinson^{[a]}	3:28
3.	"Jealous"	Atkinson; Garrett	Garrett; Atkinson^{[a]}	3:08
4.	"Pressure"	Atkinson; Garrett	Garrett; Atkinson^{[a]}	4:26
5.	"Hands Free"	Atkinson; Garrett	Garrett; Atkinson^{[a]}; Trionomics^{[a]}	3:10

Notes

- ^{^[a]} signifies a co-producer

== Charts ==
Chart (2016)	Peak position
US Top R&B/Hip-Hop Albums (Billboard)	42
US Heatseekers Albums (Billboard)	22

== Release history ==
Region	Date	Format	Label	Ref
Worldwide	4 November 2016	Digital Download; CD	Island	
