= Be Real (Kid Ink song) =

- Cover artwork for the Official Remix

Single by Kid Ink featuring Dej Loaf

from the album Full Speed
- Released: March 31, 2015
- Recorded: 2014
- Genre: Hip hop
- Length: 3:27
- Label: Tha Alumni Music Group; 88 Classic; RCA
- Songwriters: Brian Collins; Dijon McFarlane; Julian Gramma; Nicholas Audino; Lewis Hughes; Daouda Leonard; Brittany Hazzard; Dej Trimble
- Producers: DJ Mustard; J Gramm; Twice as Nice

Kid Ink singles chronology
| "Worth It" (2015) | "Be Real" (2015) | "I'm Up" (2015) |

Dej Loaf singles chronology
| "Detroit vs. Everybody" (2014) | "Be Real" (2015) | "Me U & Hennessy" (2015) |

Music video
- "Be Real" on YouTube

"Be Real" is a song by American hip hop rapper Kid Ink. The song was released on March 31, 2015, by Tha Alumni Music Group, 88 Classic and RCA Records, as the third single from his third studio album Full Speed (2015). The track was produced by frequent collaborator DJ Mustard, J Gramm and Twice as Nice and features a hook by Dej Loaf.

== Music video ==
The music video for "Be Real" was directed by Mike Ho, and filmed in a church. On March 12, 2015, MTV released an exclusive behind-the-scenes video from the filmings. The music video was released on March 31, 2015.

== Charts ==
=== Weekly charts ===
| Chart (2015) | Peak position |
|---|---|
| UK Singles (Official Charts) | 155 |
| US Billboard Hot 100 | 43 |
| US Hot R&B/Hip-Hop Songs (Billboard) | 12 |
| US Rhythmic Airplay (Billboard) | 4 |

=== Year-end charts ===
| Chart (2015) | Position |
|---|---|
| US Rhythmic (Billboard) | 24 |

== Certifications ==
| Region | Certification | Certified units/sales |
|---|---|---|
| Canada (Music Canada) | Platinum | 80,000^{‡} |
| Germany (BVMI) | Gold | 200,000^{‡} |
| New Zealand (RMNZ) | Gold | 15,000^{‡} |
| United Kingdom (BPI) | Silver | 200,000^{‡} |
| United States (RIAA) | 2× Platinum | 2,000,000^{‡} |
^{‡} Sales+streaming figures based on certification alone.
