= At the Club (Jacquees song) =

2017 single by Jacquees featuring Dej Loaf

Single by Jacquees featuring Dej Loaf

from the album Fuck a Friend Zone
- Released: September 29, 2017
- Genre: R&B
- Length: 2:53
- Label: Cash Money
- Songwriters: Rodriquez Broadnax; Deja Trimble; Kharri Hunter
- Producer: W$Kharri

Jacquees singles chronology
"Stay Over" (2017)	"At the Club" (2017)	"In My Face" (2017)

Dej Loaf singles chronology
"Changes" (2017)	"At the Club" (2017)	"Big Ole Boss" (2017)

Music video
- "At the Club" on YouTube

"At the Club" is a song by American singer Jacquees featuring American rapper Dej Loaf. It was first released on February 10, 2017 from their collaborative mixtape Fuck a Friend Zone, before being released as a single on September 29, 2017.

== Composition ==
The song was produced by W$Kharri, using "harp-like chords and squelching synths over a simple drum pattern". Jacquees sings about meeting a girl at a club, while Dej Loaf sings about being a "ride or die girlfriend".

== Music video ==
A music video for the song was released on September 29, 2017. Directed by Benny Boom, the video begins with Jacquees getting his hair done in the studio and Dej Loaf applying makeup, before they go to the club in a Lamborghini and partying in the VIP section.

== Charts ==
Chart (2018)	Peak position
US Billboard Hot 100	86
US Hot R&B/Hip-Hop Songs (Billboard)	40

== Certifications ==
Region	Certification	Certified units/sales
New Zealand (RMNZ)	Platinum	30,000^{‡}
United States (RIAA)	2× Platinum	2,000,000^{‡}
^{‡} Sales+streaming figures based on certification alone.
