= King of R&B (album) =

Studio album by Jacquees
- Released: November 8, 2019
- Recorded: 2018–2019
- Genre: R&B
- Length: 58:50
- Labels: Cash Money; Republic
- Producers: Mike Mixer; Trauma Tone; JW Lucas; Nash B; XL Eagle; Nard & B; Young Trill Beats; DJ Spinz; K-Major; Sean Garrett; $K; Troy Taylor; Xeryus; Jack Ro; Charlie Heat; Kerry "2Smooth" Marshall; SICKDRUMZ; Unknown Nick; Lewis Hughes; Murphy Kid; ForteBowie; K.

Jacquees chronology
4275 (2018)	King of R&B (2019)	Sincerely For You (2022)

Singles from King of R&B
- 1. "Your Peace" Released: March 22, 2019; 2. "Fact or Fiction" Released: November 8, 2019; 3. "Verify" Released: November 8, 2019

King of R&B is the second studio album by American singer-songwriter Jacquees. It was released on November 8, 2019, by Cash Money Records and Republic Records. The album serves as the follow-up to Jacquees' debut studio album, 4275 (2018). The album features guest appearances from T.I., TK Kravitz, FYB, Tory Lanez, Quavo, Bluff City, Young Thug, Gunna, Summer Walker, Future, Lil Keed, Lil Gotit and Lil Baby.

The album's title references Jacquees' 2018 claim that he was the "King of R&B" of his generation, which prompted public debate among musicians and listeners. King of R&B peaked at number 20 on the US Billboard 200, making it Jacquees's highest-charting album in the US to date. The album received positive reviews from music critics, with praise towards Jacquees' vocal ability and traditional R&B approach.

== Background ==
In 2018, Jacquees began working on an album that would move away from the hip-hop-influenced sound of his debut, in favor of a more traditional R&B style. The project was initially intended to be titled Round II.

In December 2018, Jacquees declared himself the "King of R&B" of his generation in a video posted on Instagram. His statement sparked widespread debate over who deserved the title, prompting reactions from several artists and commentators in the hip-hop and R&B community, including Snoop Dogg, Puff Daddy, Wiz Khalifa, 50 Cent and Bobby Brown. During the discussion, several commentators instead named Chris Brown as the genre's leading contemporary male singer.

According to Jacquees, rapper Quavo suggested that he change the album's title from Round II to King of R&B in light of the attention generated by his claim. Jacquees followed the suggestion and adopted the title for the project.

In an interview with Rolling Stone, Jacquees explained how he came to make the statement, saying that after a performance in Rochester, New York, he heard a radio host refer to him as the 'King of R&B' of his generation: "I walked in the airport. I sat down and I’m just like, "You know what man? I’m the king of R&B." That’s what’s going on. That’s how I feel. I been feeling like that before I heard it, but that’s what it is. And it fit the album's mood, the music that I made for it, it's fully straight real R&B."

== Critical reception ==
Professional ratings
Review scores
Source	Rating
Exclaim!	2.5/5 stars
Pitchfork	7.0/10
Spectrum Culture	3.5/5 stars

The album received mainly positive reviews from critics. Charles Holmes of Rolling Stone praised his performances for being "committed to the vocal athleticism that defined R&B for decades", calling it one of the best R&B albums of 2019. Exclaim!'s Mathias Pageau asserted that "Jacquees certainly has a beautiful voice", but "Listening to King of R&B, there is a sense that Jacquees tries hard to emulate his heroes, instead of letting himself be inspired by them". Sheldon Pearce of Pitchfork wrote positively of the album, stating that on the record Jacquees "even straddling the hip-hop world, he never loses the smoothness R&B requires. At a time when so many pride themselves on being genre-benders, he remains a formalist".

== Commercial performance ==
The album debuted at number 20 on the US Billboard 200, with 16,600 equivalent album units earned in its first week. It also debuted at number four on the Billboard Top R&B Albums chart, marking Jacquees's highest-charting album on the Billboard 200 to date.

== Track listing ==
King of R&B track listing
No.	Title	Writer(s)	Producer(s)	Length
1.	"King" (featuring T.I.)	Rodriquez Broadnax; Clifford Harris Jr.; John Antonio Carrington Jr.; Michael White	Mike Mixer; Trauma Tone; JW Lucas	3:17
2.	"Round II"	Broadnax; Kelvin Brown	Nash B	4:03
3.	"EEeee" (featuring TK Kravitz)	Broadnax; Tevin Thompson; Trevon Justin Campbell; James Bernard Rosser Jr.; Brandon Eric Rackley	XL Eagle; Nard & B	2:28
4.	"Come Get It" (featuring FYB)	Broadnax; Kendricke Desmond Brown; King Issa; Christopher Jones; Durante Cosby; Bobby Thompson; Aderemi Quincy Osinowo; Tevin Luray	Young Trill Beats; DJ Spinz; K-Major; Sean Garrett	4:25
5.	"Good Lovin"	Broadnax; Troy Taylor; John McGee; Daniel Breland; King Issa	Troy Taylor; Xeryus; $K	2:44
6.	"Out of the Ordinary"	Broadnax; Nija Charles	Jack Ro; Charlie Heat	3:08
7.	"Risk It All" (featuring Tory Lanez)	Broadnax; Daystar Peterson; John McGee	$K	3:27
8.	"Warning"	Broadnax; Kendricke Desmond Brown; K.	XL Eagle; $K; Sean Garrett; K-Major	3:45
9.	"All You Need" (featuring Quavo and Bluff City)	Broadnax; K.; Quavious Keyate Marshall	$K	4:29
10.	"Cross the Line"	Broadnax; Mbeng Denzel Ayuk-okata; Kelvin Brown	Nash B	2:01
11.	"Fact or Fiction"	Broadnax; King Issa; Daniel Breland; Ahmad Brown; Kerry Marshall	Troy Taylor; Kerry "2Smooth" Marshall	2:36
12.	"New New"	Broadnax; Te Whiti Warbrick; Nicholas Audino; Nija Charles	SICKDRUMZ; Unknown Nick; Lewis Hughes	2:50
13.	"Verify" (featuring Young Thug and Gunna)	Broadnax; Kelvin Brown; Jeffery Lamar Williams; Sergio Kitchens	Nash B	2:43
14.	"Never Say Goodbye"	Broadnax; Kendricke Desmond Brown; Cameron Murphy	Murphy Kid	3:17
15.	"Superstar" (featuring Summer Walker)	Broadnax; Kelvin Brown	Nash B	3:08
16.	"What They Gone Do With Me" (featuring Future)	Broadnax; Nayvadius Wilburn; Gary Rafael Hill	DJ Spinz	3:36
17.	"Hot for Me" (featuring Lil Keed and Lil Gotit)	Broadnax; Raqhid Render; Semaja Z. Render; Mbeng Denzel Ayuk-okata	ForteBowie	3:49
18.	"Your Peace" (featuring Lil Baby)	Broadnax; Mbeng Denzel Ayuk-okata; Tevin Thompson; Dominique Jones; John McGee; Simon Kemper; K.	K.	3:04
Total length:				58:50

== Charts ==
Chart (2019)	Peak position
Canadian Albums (Billboard)	66
French Albums (SNEP)	164
US Billboard 200	20
US Top R&B/Hip-Hop Albums (Billboard)	15
UK Hip Hop and R&B Albums Chart	33
