= You (Jacquees song) =

2018 song by Jacquees

Single by Jacquees

from the album Before Anythang, Lost at Sea 2 and 4275
- Released: July 24, 2018
- Recorded: 2016
- Genre: R&B
- Length: 3:38
- Label: Cash Money
- Songwriters: Rodriquez Broadnax; Tyler Holmes; Cassius Clay; Jocelyn Adriene Donald
- Producer: London on da Track

Jacquees singles chronology
"Trip (QueMix)" (2018)	"You" (2018)	"The Light (QueMix)" (2018)

Music video
- "You" on YouTube

"You" is a song by American singer Jacquees. It is from his mixtape Before Anythang (2017) and the third single from his debut studio album 4275 (2018), appearing as a bonus track. The song also appears on his collaborative EP Lost at Sea 2 (2018) with American rapper Birdman. The song was produced by London on da Track.

== Composition ==
Karlton Jamal of HotNewHipHop described the song as "silky smooth". The song finds Jacquees confessing his love for a girl.

== Music video ==
A music video for the song was released on November 9, 2018. In it, Jacquees ponders on proposing to a woman he loves. The woman believes he is cheating, but he attempts to show her that he would rather be with her than anyone else.

== Remix ==
A remix featuring American rapper Blueface was released on January 11, 2019. On the remix, Blueface sings in Auto-Tune and "reflects on taking remedial steps in a relationship".

== Live performances ==
Jacquees performed the song at the 2018 Soul Train Music Awards.

== Charts ==
Chart performance for "You"
Chart (2019)	Peak position
US Billboard Hot 100	58
US Hot R&B/Hip-Hop Songs (Billboard)	26

== Certifications ==
Certifications for "You"
Region	Certification	Certified units/sales
Brazil (Pro-Música Brasil)	2× Platinum	80,000^{‡}
United States (RIAA)	3× Platinum	3,000,000^{‡}
^{‡} Sales+streaming figures based on certification alone.
