= Put In Work =

2020 single by Jacquees featuring Chris Brown

Single by Jacquees featuring Chris Brown
- Released: July 23, 2020
- Recorded: 2020
- Genre: R&B
- Length: 3:20
- Label: FYB Ent 4275; Cash Money; Republic
- Songwriters: Rodriquez Jacquees Broadnax; Christopher Brown
- Producers: XL Eagle, OG Parker

Jacquees singles chronology
"What's on Your Mind" (2020)	"Put In Work" (2020)	"Only Fan" (2021)

Chris Brown singles chronology
"Go Crazy" (2020)	"Put In Work" (2020)	"Say You Love Me" (2020)

Music video
- "Put In Work" on YouTube

"Put In Work" is a song by American R&B singer Jacquees, featuring American singer Chris Brown. It was released on July 23, 2020, as the lead single from Jacquees's then-planned third studio album. The song was written by Jacquees and Brown and produced by OG Parker and XL Eagle.

== Composition ==
"Put In Work" is a mid-tempo R&B song written by Jacquees and Brown and produced by OG Parker and XL Eagle. Jacquees performs the verses, while Brown handles the chorus, which combines a rap section with a melodic R&B passage.

The song was first previewed on June 8, 2020, in a video shared on producer OG Parker's Instagram account. The clip showed Parker and Brown in a recording studio listening to the track.

== Music video ==
The music video was released alongside the single on July 23, 2020. Filmed in Los Angeles, it features scenes in the surroundings of Brown's Tarzana mansion as they ride in Brown's Lamborghini.

== Charts ==
Chart (2020)	Peak position
New Zealand Hot Singles (RMNZ)	16
US Hot R&B Songs (Billboard)	8

== Certifications ==
Region	Certification	Certified units/sales
United States (RIAA)	Gold	500,000^{‡}
^{‡} Sales+streaming figures based on certification alone.
