= Robert Sandifer =

American gang member and murder victim (1983-1994)

- Mug shot of Sandifer
- Born: March 12, 1983; Chicago, Illinois, US
- Died: September 1, 1994 (aged 11); Chicago, Illinois, US
- Cause of death: Gunshot wounds
- Other name: "Yummy"
- Occupations: Street gang member (Black Disciples)
- Status: Deceased
- Criminal charges: Arson, armed robbery, drug possession
- Penalty: Probation

Robert Sandifer (March 12, 1983 – September 1, 1994), also known as Yummy, was an American boy from Chicago, Illinois who was a member of the Chicago street gang the Black Disciples (BD). His murder at age 11 by fellow gang members in Chicago garnered national attention because of his age, resulting in his appearing on the cover of Time magazine in September 1994. His nickname originated from his love for cookies.

Sandifer had committed murder, theft, and armed robbery, but he was murdered by his own fellow gang members who feared he could become an informant and expose their criminal activities to authorities if he were arrested. Coverage of Sandifer's death and retrospectives on his short, violent life were widely published in the American media. Sandifer became a symbol of the gang problem in American inner cities, the failure of social safety nets, and the shortcomings of the juvenile justice system.

== Early life, family and education ==
Robert Sandifer was born in Chicago on March 12, 1983. Sandifer's mother, Lorina Sandifer, had over 41 arrests, many of which were relating to prostitution. Sandifer's father, Robert Akins, was absent throughout Sandifer's life due to incarceration for a felony gun charge. Sandifer was physically abused from the time he was an infant.

Before he was three years old, Sandifer was already known to the Illinois Department of Children and Family Services (DCFS). Physical examinations showed that Sandifer was alleged to have had cigarette burns on his arms and neck as well as linear bruising consistent with physical beatings. Lorina initially blamed the abuse on Sandifer's father, although she later recanted.

In 1987, Sandifer and his siblings were removed from his mother's home by DCFS. The children were sent to live with their grandmother in Chicago's Roseland neighborhood. This residence contained as many as 19 children on some occasions. By most accounts, this grandmother's home was not much better than Sandifer's previous home.

By age eight, Sandifer quit attending school and began to roam the streets, stealing cars and breaking into houses. At age ten, he was arrested on charges of armed robbery. A psychological examiner at the time reported that "Robert is a child growing up without any encouragement and support", and that he "has a sense of failure that has infiltrated almost every aspect of his inner self".

In 1993, Sandifer and his siblings were removed from his grandmother's home and were sent to the Lawrence Hall DCFS shelter on Chicago's North Side. Sandifer ran away from the facility and never returned. From 1993 until his death, Sandifer's whereabouts and living arrangements remain unclear, although he continued to be arrested by the authorities.

== Murder of Shavon Dean ==
On August 28, 1994, Sandifer's gang associates ordered him to ambush their rivals as an initiation test, since his age made him less conspicuous. He opened fire with a 9-millimeter semiautomatic pistol, striking several youths. Sandifer quickly fled the scene. Among his victims was a 14-year-old girl, Shavon Dean, who was fatally hit by a stray bullet.

== Death ==
After the shooting, the police were looking for Sandifer, who was hiding with gang members in his neighborhood. On August 31, 1994, while standing on a neighbor's porch after trying to call his grandmother and asking for prayers as he was going to turn himself in, Sandifer was met by brothers Cragg Hardaway, 16, and Derrick Hardaway, 14, who were both members of the Black Disciples street gang. Sandifer was told he was being taken to a safe location out of town and ordered into a waiting car.

Instead, he was taken to a railroad underpass at East 108th Street and South Dauphin Avenue and told to get on his knees. While kneeling, Sandifer was shot twice in the back of the head by the two Hardaway brothers. Sandifer's body was discovered by the Chicago Police Department in the early morning hours of September 1, 1994.

Around 400 people attended Sandifer's funeral, which was held at the Youth Center of a Church of God in Christ on Chicago's Northwest Side. The only photo that his family could find of him was his mug shot.

The two Hardaway brothers were later convicted of Robert Sandifer's murder. Derrick received a 45-year sentence and Cragg received a 60-year sentence. Derrick was released from prison in December 2016. Cragg was released from prison in December 2020. Cragg died at age 47 on August 14, 2026.

== In popular media ==
- Yummy: the Last Days of a Southside Shorty, a graphic novel
- In The Equalizer 2, Robert McCall calls Miles "Lil Yummy" as part of his argument as to why Miles shouldn't join the local gang.

== See also ==
- List of homicides in Illinois
- List of youngest killers
- African-American organized crime
