= Shawty =

Southern American slang for 'shorty'

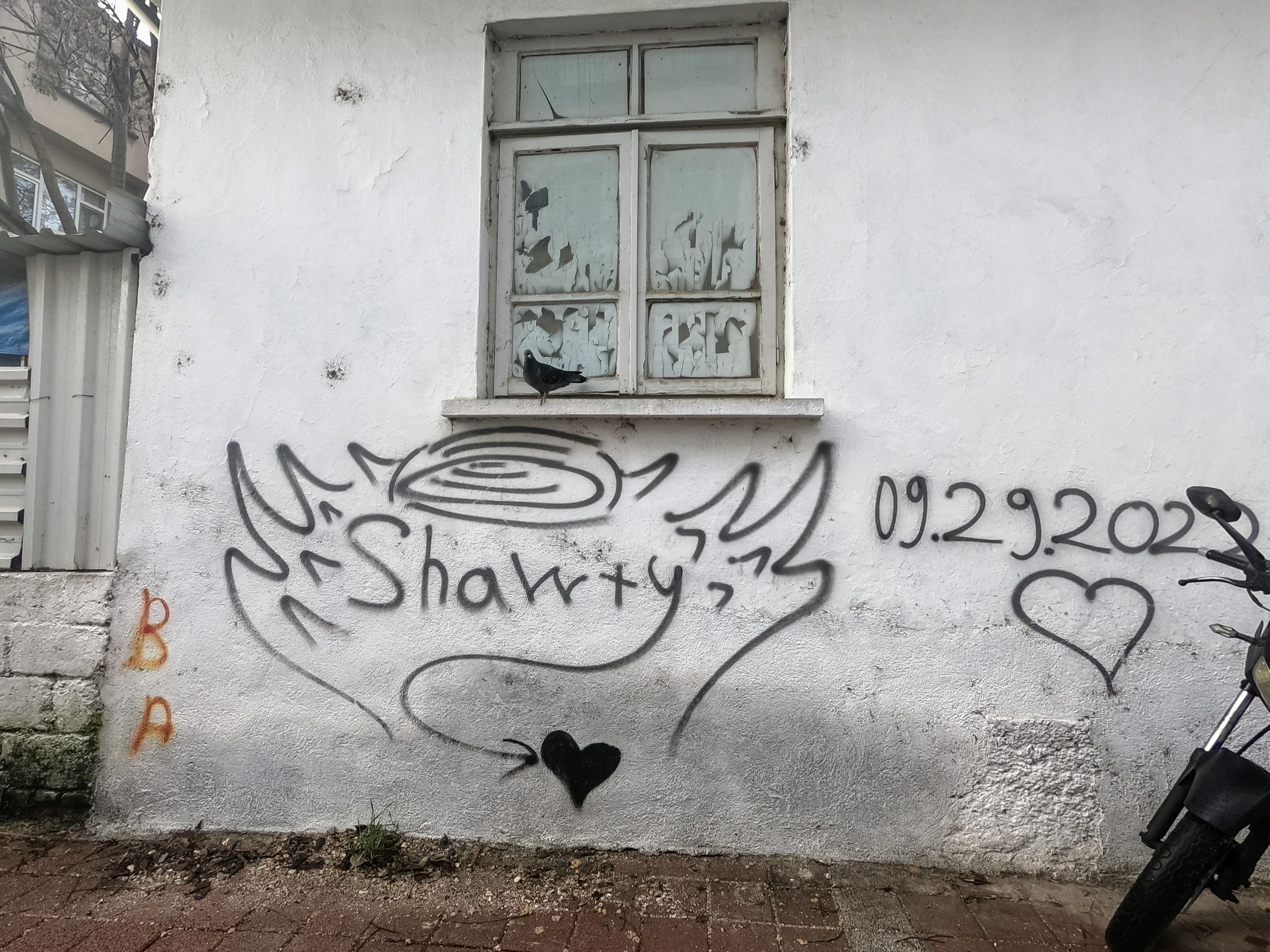
"Shawty" graffiti in Turkey

Shawty (/ˈʃɔːti/), shorty, shauty, betty, Roxy or shortie is a slang term from African American Vernacular English used generally as a nonspecific term of endearment. Shawty is a Southern and African American variant of shorty, and can refer to someone of any gender who is shorter in stature compared to a taller person. It is also frequently used to amicably address newcomers, children, and good friends. However, in specific settings, it can be interpreted as a catcall. Since the 1990s, the term has also been used to refer to young and attractive women, mostly in hip-hop tracks from that decade and those from the early 2000s.
