= Jacquees =

American singer (born 1994)

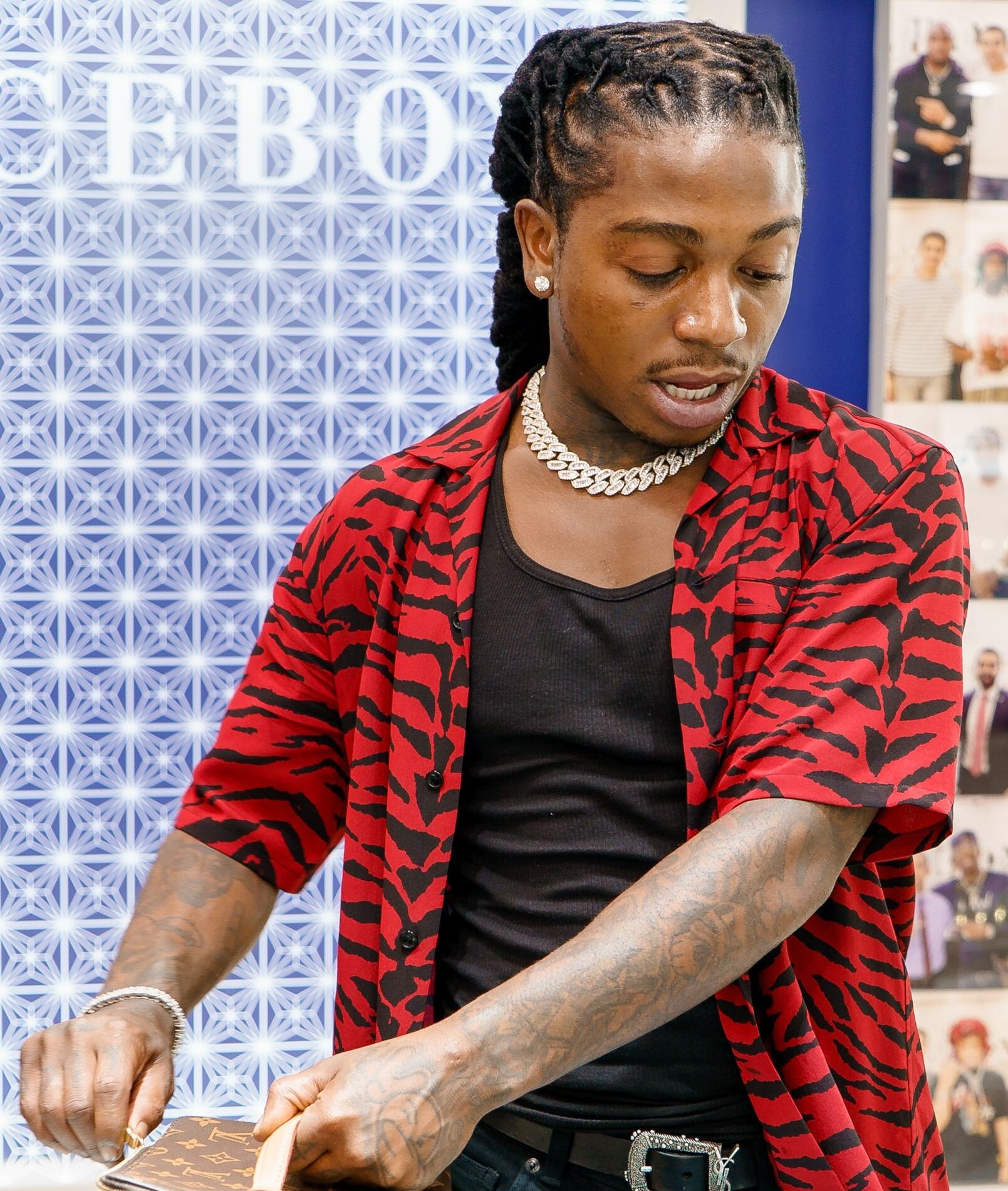
- Jacquees in 2019

Background information
- Born: Rodriquez Jacquees Broadnax; April 15, 1995 (age 31); Decatur, Georgia, U.S.
- Origin: Atlanta, Georgia
- Genre: R&B
- Occupations: Singer; songwriter
- Works: Jacquees discography
- Years active: 2010–present
- Labels: 4275; Cash Money; Republic
- Member of: Rich Gang
- Website: jacqueeslive.com

Rodriquez Jacquees Broadnax (born April 15, 1995), known mononymously as Jacquees (/dʒɑːˈkwis/ jah-KWEESS), is an American singer and songwriter. He signed with Birdman's Cash Money Records in 2014, and first gained recognition with his 2016 single, "B.E.D."; the song peaked at number 69 on the Billboard Hot 100 and received quadruple platinum certification by the Recording Industry Association of America (RIAA).

His 2018 single, "You", peaked at number 58 on the Billboard Hot 100 and received triple platinum certification as well; both the song and "B.E.D." preceded his debut studio album, 4275 (2018), which moderately entered the Billboard 200. His second album, King of R&B (2019), peaked at number 20 on the chart, while his third album, Sincerely For You (2022), narrowly entered the chart.

== Career ==
In 2007, Jacquees met his first manager, Corey Battle. He performed in a variety of talent shows before he met and switched management to his uncle Russell "Block" Spencer, CEO and founder of Block Entertainment. Jacquees worked in various recording studios as part of a production team. Block's focus was only rap music, and Jacquees later began working closely at Block's recording studio, gaining exposure with the track "Krazy", featuring Atlanta rapper T.I. In 2014, he signed to Corey and Monta who managed him upon his 2016 Cash Money deal. During the early stages of his career, Jacquees also gained exposure through YouTube, where he uploaded covers of songs by R&B singers such as Chris Brown and Usher, which he called "Quemixes".

On March 25, 2014, Jacquees independently released his second EP, 19. The project featured guest appearances from Chris Brown, Rich Homie Quan, Lloyd and Trinidad James, and reached number 15 on Billboard's Top R&B Albums chart and number three on the iTunes R&B/Soul chart. The project helped bring him to the attention of rapper and record executive Birdman and led to his signing with Cash Money later that year. He subsequently collaborated with Birdman on the EP Lost at Sea in 2016.

Jacquees achieved his first major commercial success with the single "B.E.D.", released in 2016. The song became his breakthrough hit and was certified quadruple platinum by the RIAA. His collaboration with DeJ Loaf, "At the Club", also entered the Hot 100, and was certified double platinum, while his single "You" reached number 58 on the chart and was certified triple platinum. The singles anticipated his debut album, 4275, released in June 2018, featuring appearances from Birdman, Trey Songz, Chris Brown, DeJ Loaf, Young Thug, Jagged Edge and others. The album debuted at number 35 on the Billboard 200 and number three on the Top R&B/Hip-Hop Albums chart, and was certified gold by the RIAA.

On September 1, 2018, he released a cover version of Ella Mai's "Trip", which he called a "Quemix", attracting significant attention online, with media outlets describing it as surpassing the popularity of the original, which had been released one month earlier. Jacquees' version was removed from SoundCloud and YouTube by September 5 following a cease-and-desist request from 10 Summers Records, Mai's label. On September 26, the label's founder and Mai's producer DJ Mustard confirmed that he and the label had ordered the removal, accusing Jacquees of attempting to monetize copyrighted material without authorization. Jacquees denied the accusation, stating that he had uploaded the remix to SoundCloud and YouTube and had not intended to profit from it. Jacquees later discussed the dispute in interviews, claiming that Mai had initially welcomed his version of the song and had commented positively on it before its removal. Mai subsequently addressed the controversy in an interview with Hot 97, denying that she had been responsible for the removal and suggesting that the label's concerns about monetization had prompted the decision.

In December 2018, Jacquees sparked widespread debate after declaring himself the "King of R&B" for his generation in a video posted to his Instagram Story. The statement went viral and prompted reactions from several artists and commentators, including Tank, Tyrese, Trey Songz, Ty Dolla Sign, Eric Bellinger, J. Holiday and John Legend. Several of those who weighed in named Chris Brown as the singer they considered deserving of the title. In a December 2018 interview with Rolling Stone, he discussed his statement, reaffirmed his claim to the title and stated that the discussion brought renewed attention to the genre. Jacquees subsequently used the nickname as the title for his second studio album, King of R&B, released on November 8, 2019, through Cash Money Records. The album featured guest appearances from T.I., Tory Lanez, Quavo, Young Thug, Gunna, Summer Walker, Future and Lil Baby, among others, and was anticipated by the singles "Your Peace", "Fact or Fiction", "Who's", and "Verify". It debuted at number 20 on the Billboard 200, becoming Jacquees's highest-charting album to date, and reached number four on the Top R&B Albums chart. King of R&B received generally positive reviews from music critics. Sheldon Pearce of Pitchfork gave the album a 7.0 out of 10, stating that "he never loses the smoothness R&B requires. At a time when so many pride themselves on being genre-benders, he remains a formalist". Revolt included the album among its nine best R&B projects of 2019, placing it third on its year-end list. Jacquees subsequently embarked on the King of R&B Tour in early 2020 in support of the album. In 2020, he released the single "Put In Work" in collaboration with Chris Brown.

In December 2022, Jacquees released his third studio album, Sincerely for You, featuring guest appearances from Future, Summer Walker, 6lack, 21 Savage, among others. The album debuted at number 163 on the Billboard 200 and number 20 on the Top R&B Albums chart. His fourth studio album, Baby Making, followed in November 2024. In February 2025, he reunited with DeJ Loaf for F**k a Friendzone 2, a collaborative album that serves as a sequel to their 2017 mixtape.

== Personal life ==
Jacquees has a son, born in 2024, with Deiondra Sanders, the daughter of former professional football player Deion Sanders. The couple separated in 2025.

=== Legal issues ===
In 2018, Jacquees was arrested and booked in Atlanta for driving 116 mph. Police also found marijuana thrown out his window and three grams of marijuana in his car. He was charged with reckless driving, littering, and possession of a controlled substance.

In 2023, Jacquees was arrested and booked in Gwinnett County for simple battery and willful obstruction of law enforcement officers. He was charged for his part in a fight at a sports bar, where he was accused of arguing with security and choking a female employee and biting her hand. He was released on a $3,700 bond.

In September 2026, Jacquees was arrested in Hollywood, Florida, after police found him asleep in a vehicle stopped at an intersection. According to the arrest report, an officer smelled alcohol and Jacquees became combative while being taken to a hospital, striking the officer in the arm. He was charged with driving under the influence, battery on an officer, firefighter or emergency medical technician, and resisting an officer without violence. He was released on a $3,500 bond.

== Discography ==
Studio albums

- 4275 (2018)
- King of R&B (2019)
- Sincerely For You (2022)
- Baby Making (2024)

Collaborative albums

- Fuck a Friend Zone 2 (with Dej Loaf) (2025)

== Awards and nominations ==
Award	Year	Nominated work	Category	Result	Ref.
iHeartRadio Music Awards	2018	"B.E.D."	R&B Song of the Year	Nominated	
BET Awards	2020	Jacquees	Best Male R&B/Pop Artist	Nominated	
