= Dej Loaf =

American rapper and singer (born 1991)

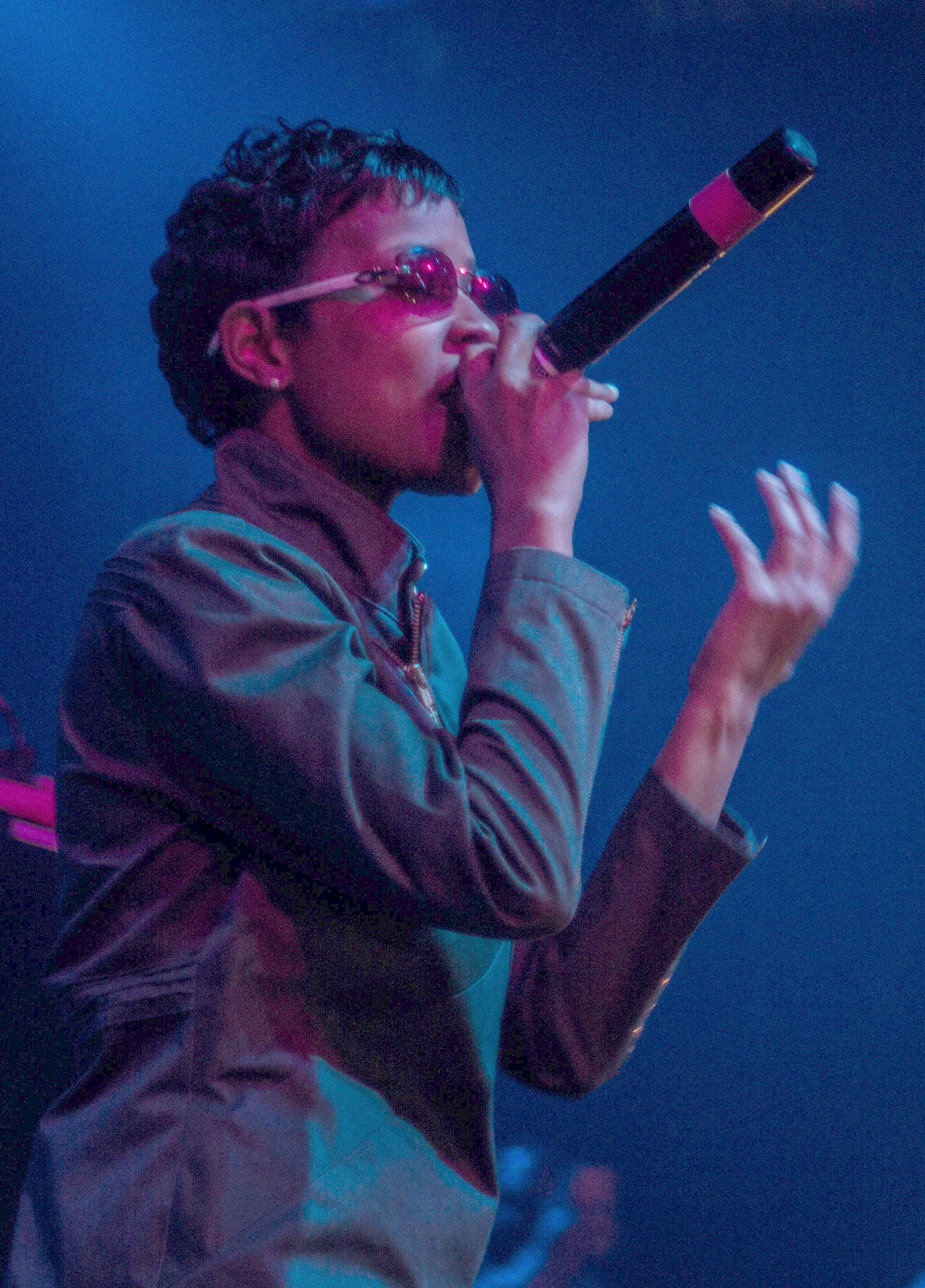
- Dej Loaf in 2015

Background information
- Born: Deja Monét Trimble; April 8, 1991 (age 35); Detroit, Michigan, U.S.
- Genres: Midwestern hip-hop; R&B
- Occupations: Rapper; singer; songwriter
- Years active: 2011–present
- Labels: Yellow World; Equity Distribution; Roc Nation; Fomily Foundation; BMG; Columbia
- Website: dejloafmusic.com

Deja Monét Trimble (born April 8, 1991), known professionally as Dej Loaf (stylized as DeJ Loaf), is an American rapper and singer from Detroit, Michigan. She is best known for her 2014 single "Try Me" and its 2015 follow-up, "Back Up" (featuring Big Sean). The latter received platinum certification by the Recording Industry Association of America (RIAA) and served as lead single for her debut extended play ...And See That's the Thing (2015), which was released by Columbia Records. Both songs, along with her guest appearance on Kid Ink's 2015 single "Be Real", peaked within the top 50 of the Billboard Hot 100. Her debut studio album, Sell Sole II (2020), was met with positive critical reception despite failing to chart.

== Early life ==
Trimble was raised on the east side of Detroit, Michigan. As a child, she often listened to music with her parents and grandmother, including 2Pac, Rakim and Miles Davis. Her father was killed when she was four years old. A self-described "good kid and a decent student" who mostly kept to herself, she began writing her own original music at the age of 9. In 2009, she graduated from Southeastern High School in Detroit, playing basketball at the junior varsity level. She then attended Saginaw Valley State University and studied nursing for three semesters before deciding to focus full-time on her recording career.

== Career ==
In 2011, Dej Loaf began her career as a hip hop artist. Her stage name is a portmanteau of a shortened version of her first name, "Deja", and "loafer", as she took a keen interest in Air Jordans when growing up. In 2012, she released her first official mixtape, Just Do It. It attracted the attention of fellow Detroit-native rapper SAYITAINTTONE, who signed her to his record label, IBGM (I Been Gettin' Money). In July 2014, she released her song "Try Me" (produced by DDS), as a single, which earned her viral popularity. Canadian rapper Drake quoted lyrics from the song in his Instagram post. In October 2014, she signed a major record deal to Columbia Records. After signing the deal, she released her second official mixtape and major label debut, Sell Sole. The mixtape was given an "A−" by music critic Robert Christgau, who wrote in his review for Vice, "What's irresistible is the form-content disparity—a rapper who brags so un-macho, a rapper whose greed is so explicitly for her family, a rapper who's "Grindin'" at music. Plus her flow is a brook, her producer respects her space, and her two sex rhymes are into it and into it more."

Dej Loaf rapped on the song "Detroit vs. Everybody" featured on Eminem's compilation Shady XV (2014). In 2015, she opened for Nicki Minaj during the North American leg of The Pinkprint Tour. Later that year, she was chosen as part of the XXL magazine 2015 Freshman Class.

In February 2016, Dej Loaf released a mixtape called All Jokes Aside. In July 2017, she released a joint mixtape with Jacquees titled Fuck a Friend Zone.

After several years of delays, Dej Loaf split from Columbia Records in 2019. She then independently released her debut album, Sell Sole II on October 23, 2020. It features appearances from Big Sean, Gunna, Rick Ross, Lil Uzi Vert, and 6lack. The album is the sequel to Dej Loaf's 2014 mixtape Sell Sole. The album holds a 72/100 rating on Metacritic, indicating "generally favorable reviews".

In February 2021, Dej Loaf was featured on Sevyn Streeter's single "Guilty" along with Chris Brown and ASAP Ferg.

== Discography ==
=== Studio albums ===
Title	Album details
Sell Sole II	Released: October 23, 2020; Label: Yellow World, BMG Rights Management; Format: Digital download, streaming
Fuck a Friend Zone 2 (with Jacquees)	Released: February 14, 2025; Label: Cash Money, Republic Records, FYB Records, Yellow World, Empire; Format: Digital download, streaming, CD

=== Extended plays ===
List of extended plays, with selected information
Title	Album details	Peak chart positions		
Title	Album details	US	US R&B/ HH	US Rap
...And See That's the Thing	Released: July 31, 2015; Label: Columbia Records; Format: Digital download	47	8	6
'Go DeJ Go' Vol.1	Released: December 28, 2018; Label: Yellow World / The Dispensary; Format: Digital download	—	—	—
It's a Set Up!	Released: May 22, 2020; Label: Yellow World / BMG Rights Management; Format: Digital download, streaming	—	—	—
No Saint	Released: May 29, 2020; Label: Yellow World / BMG Rights Management; Format: Digital download, streaming	—	—	—
"—" denotes a recording that did not chart or was not released in that territory.

=== Mixtapes ===
- Just Do It (2012)
- Sell Sole (2014)
- All Jokes Aside (2016)
- Fuck a Friend Zone (with Jacquees) (2017)

=== Singles ===
==== As lead artist ====
List of singles as lead artist, with selected chart positions, showing year released and album name
Title	Year	Peak chart positions			Certifications	Album
Title	Year	US	US R&B/ HH	US Rap	Certifications	Album
"Try Me"	2014	45	12	8	RIAA: Gold	Non-album singles
"We Good"	2014	—	—	—		Non-album singles
"Detroit vs. Everybody" (with Eminem, Royce da 5'9", Danny Brown, Big Sean and Trick-Trick)	2014	— (Note: "Detroit Vs. Everybody" did not enter the US Billboard Hot 100, but peaked at number eight on the Bubbling Under Hot 100 Singles chart.)	28	23		Shady XV
"We Be on It"	2015	—	—	—		Sell Sole
"Me U & Hennessy (Remix)" (featuring Lil Wayne)	2015	— (Note: "Me U & Hennessy (Remix)" did not enter the Billboard Hot 100, but peaked at number six on the Bubbling Under Hot 100 Singles chart.)	38	—		Non-album single
"Back Up" (featuring Big Sean)	2015	47	16	10	RIAA: Platinum	...And See That's the Thing
"Hey There" (featuring Future)	2015	— (Note: "Hey There" did not enter the Billboard Hot 100, but peaked at number 17 on the Bubbling Under Hot 100 Singles chart.)	47	—	RIAA: Platinum	...And See That's the Thing
"In Living Color (Oh Na Na)"	2016	—	—	—		Non-album singles
"No Fear"	2017	100	43	—	RIAA: Gold	Non-album singles
"Liberated" (with Leon Bridges)	2018	—	—	—		Non-album singles
"Star" (featuring Dave East and Nicole Bus)	2020	—	—	—		True to the Game 2
"—" denotes a recording that did not chart or was not released in that territory.

==== As featured artist ====
List of singles as featured artist, with selected chart positions, showing year released and album name
Title	Year	Peak chart positions			Certifications	Album
Title	Year	US	US R&B/ HH	US Rap	Certifications	Album
"Money on the Flow" (Aubreyus featuring Dej Loaf)	2014	—	—	—		Non-album singles
"Hardcore" ($pain featuring Dej Loaf)	2014	—	—	—		Non-album singles
"I Ain't Got Time" (Young Klep featuring Dej Loaf)	2014	—	—	—		Non-album singles
"Girls Love to Party" (Gueringer The13th featuring Dej Loaf)	2014	—	—	—		Non-album singles
"Red Leather" (Jimmy Goodz featuring Dej Loaf)	2014	—	—	—		Non-album singles
"Vest Up" (Locx featuring Dej Loaf)	2015	—	—	—		No Plan BS
"Be Real" (Kid Ink featuring Dej Loaf)	2015	43	12	7	RIAA: Platinum	Full Speed
"What You Do To Me (Remix)" (Lil Durk featuring Dej Loaf)	2015	—	—	—		Non-album singles
"Ryda" (The Game featuring Dej Loaf)	2015	—	— (Note: "Ryda" did not enter the US Hot R&B/Hip-Hop Songs chart, but peaked at number two on the Bubbling Under Hot R&B/Hip-Hop Singles chart.)	—		Non-album singles
"All Hands on Deck Remix" (Tinashe featuring Dej Loaf)	2015	—	—	—		Aquarius
"Tied Up" (Casey Veggies featuring Dej Loaf)	2015	—	— (Note: "Tied Up" did not enter the Hot R&B/Hip-Hop Songs chart, but peaked at number one on the Bubbling Under R&B/Hip-Hop Singles chart.)	—	RIAA: Gold	Live & Grow
"All Said and Done" (Chevy Woods featuring Dej Loaf)	2015	—	—	—		The 48 Hunnid Project
"I Just Wanna..." (Elijah Blake featuring Dej Loaf)	2015	—	—	—		Shadows & Diamonds
"Til the Morning" (DJ Carisma featuring Chris Brown and Dej Loaf)	2015	—	—	—		Non-album singles
"Ride for Me" (Teddy Tee featuring Dej Loaf)	2015	—	—	—		Non-album singles
"Its Just Money" (51 Reese featuring Dej Loaf)	2015	—	—	—		Non-album singles
"On a Hater, Pt. 2" (Squirm G featuring Rambo K Kutta and Dej Loaf)	2015	—	—	—		Non-album singles
"Lifestyle, Pt. II" (Oba Rowland featuring Dex Osama and Dej Loaf)	2015	—	—	—		Black Santa
"My Beyoncé" (Lil Durk featuring Dej Loaf)	2015	— (Note: "My Beyoncé" did not enter the US Billboard Hot 100, but peaked at number two on the Bubbling Under Hot 100 Singles chart.)	32	—	RIAA: Platinum	300 Days, 300 Nights and Lil Durk 2X
"Serena" (Dreezy featuring Dej Loaf)	2015	—	—	—		From Now On
"We Do This Shit" (Mod Sun featuring Dej Loaf)	2016	—	—	—		Movie
"At the Club" (Jacquees featuring Dej Loaf)	2017	86	40	—	RIAA: Platinum	Non-album single
"Ride It" (Tink featuring Dej Loaf)	2019	—	—	—		Voicemails
"Fear of GOD" (Conway the Machine featuring Dej Loaf)	2020	—	—	—		From King to God
"—" denotes a recording that did not chart or was not released in that territory.

=== Guest appearances ===
List of non-single guest appearances, with other performing artists, showing year released and album name
Title	Year	Other artist(s)	Album
"Baddest in the Building"	2014	E-40, Luigi the Singer	Sharp On All 4 Corners: Corner 2
"Allergic 2 Broke"	2014	Webbo	Independent Ballin
"Blah Blah Blah (Remix)"	2014	Rich Homie Quan, Fabolous, Ty Dolla Sign	—N/a
"Possible"	2014	Mike Will Made It, Yung Joey	Ransom
"Givin N' Takin	2014	The Neighbourhood, Danny Seth	#000000 & #FFFFFF
"Found One"	2015	Oba Rowland	Found One
"Post to Be (Remix)"	2015	Omarion, Ty Dolla Sign, Trey Songz, Rick Ross	—N/a
"League of My Own"	2015	Samantha J	—N/a
"Real"	2015	Trae Tha Truth	Tha Truth
"Step Up"	2015	The Game, Sha Sha	The Documentary 2
"I Don't Belong to You (remix)"	2015	Keke Palmer, Ty Dolla Sign	—N/a
"Fail to See Me (Remix)"	2015	K Jewlzz, Drey Skonie	Senior Year – The Evolution
"Go so Hard"	2015	Jerry Parker	The Illustration
"Possible"	2015	Yung Joey	Necessary Evil (The Preface)
"Set It Off"	2016	Jacquees	Mood
"On a Hater"	2016	Rambo K Kutta, Squirm G	Drugz and Jewelz
"Good Good"	2016	Lil Durk, Kid Ink	—N/a
"Nobody On Jupiter"	2016	Jesse Boykins III	Bartholomew
"Rider Life"	2016	Lil Durk	They Forgot
"Maybach Music V"	2017	Rick Ross	Rather You Than Me
"Ol Skool"	2017	Sevyn Streeter, Jeremih	Girl Disrupted
"Red Light"	2018	Jacquees	4275
"What We Have"	2018	Nef the Pharaoh	The Big Chang Theory
"Famous"	2018	Mozzy, Yo Gotti, Iamsu!	Gangland Landlord
"White Lines"	2019	Rick Ross	Port of Miami 2
"Guapanese"	2019	Lil Pete	Hardaway
"Shoot My Shot"	2019	Yung Bleu	Investments 6
"Gov't Cheese"	2020	Jadakiss, Nino Man, Millyz	Ignatius
"Can't Get Enough"	2020	Jackboy, Stevie J	Love Me While I'm Here
"Liar Liar"	2024	Houdini	HOU I'M MEANT TO BE
