= Roscoe Dash discography =

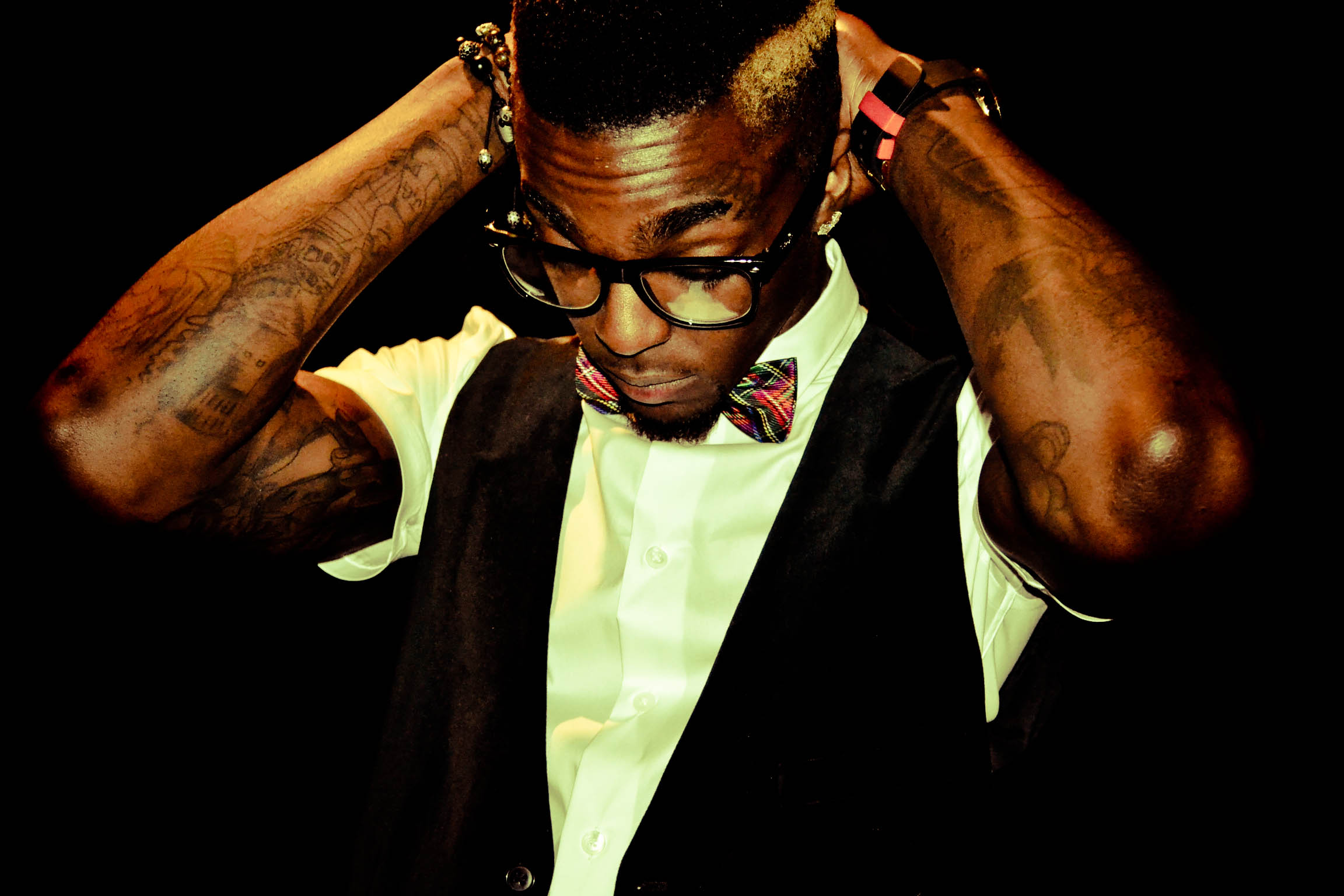
- Extended plays: 1
- Compilation albums: 1
- Singles: 8
- Music videos: 8
- Mixtapes: 6

The discography of Roscoe Dash, an American rapper, consists of one extended play, six mixtapes, two music videos, and eight singles, (including ten as a featured artist).

Dash's first mixtape, Can't Catch the Lambo with DJ Kutt Throat, was released on March 22, 2010, preceded his first single, "All the Way Turnt Up" featuring rapper and record producer Soulja Boy. "All the Way Turnt Up" peaked inside the top fifty of the Billboard Hot 100, and also charted inside the top twenty of the Hot R&B/Hip-Hop Songs, and Hot Rap Songs charts. "Show Out" was released as a single as well. The debut EP, J.U.I.C.E. was released on December 20, 2011, which has been preceded by the lone single "Good Good Night". It charted at number ninety-one on the Billboard Hot 100.

In addition to his own work, Dash has appeared in several other artist's recordings, the most commercially successful of these being "No Hands" by Waka Flocka Flame, along with rapper Wale, which peaked at number 13 on the Billboard Hot 100.

== Albums ==
=== Compilation albums ===
List of compilation albums and details
Title	Albums details
5Thy5ive	Released: December 27, 2018; Label: Dreamers Republic; Format: Digital download, streaming

=== Miscellaneous ===
Title	Album details	Notes
Ready Set Go!	Released: November 2, 2010 (US); Label: MMI, MusicLine, Zone 4, Interscope; Format: Bootleg, digital download	Originally meant to be released as Roscoe Dash's debut studio album, however it was leaked and accidentally shipped to retail markets before the official release date. In his opinion, the album was released unfinished.

== Mixtapes ==
Roscoe Dash's mixtapes and details
Title	Mixtape details
Can't Catch the Lambo	Released: March 19, 2010; Hosted by DJ Kutt Throat
Demolition 2020	Released: September 1, 2010; Hosted by DJ Kutt Throat
Dash Effect	Released: August 3, 2011; Hosted by DJ Drama & DJ Kutt Throat
Cleaning Out My Closet (with Hoven X)	Released: March 5, 2012
2.0	Released: August 14, 2012
The Appetizer (as Roscoe Dash 2.0)	Released: August 29, 2014; Hosted by DJ Fly Guy
Glitch	Released: March 2, 2016; Hosted by DJ Fly Guy

== Extended plays ==
Title	EP details	Peak chart positions		
Title	EP details	US	US R&B /HH	US Rap
J.U.I.C.E.	Released: December 20, 2011; Label: MusicLine, Geffen, Interscope; Formats: CD, digital download	133	28	17

== Singles ==
=== As lead artist ===
List of singles as lead artist, with selected chart positions, showing year released and album name
Title	Year	Peak chart positions			Album
Title	Year	US	US R&B /HH	US Rap	Album
"All the Way Turnt Up" (featuring Soulja Boy)	2010	46	18	10	Ready Set Go!
"Show Out"	2010	—	41	22	Ready Set Go!
"My Own Step" (featuring T-Pain and Fabo)	2010	—	89	—	Step Up 3D: Soundtrack
"Good Good Night"	2011	91	44	—	J.U.I.C.E.
"Usta / Kiklt"	2013	—	—	—	Non-album singles
"Get Down"	2013	—	—	—	Non-album singles
"Work" (featuring Big A)	2013	—	—	—	Non-album singles
"Right Now"	2014	—	—	—	The Appetizer
"Thr33sum"	2014	—	—	—	The Appetizer
"Murk 'Em"	2014	—	—	—	Glitch
"Catch a Body"	2015	—	—	—	Glitch
"Flexxxin"	2016	—	—	—	Glitch
"Options"	2016	—	—	—	Glitch
"Rolling Stone"	2017	—	—	—	Non-album singles
"Black Mink"	2017	—	—	—	Non-album singles
"You Better"	2017	—	—	—	Non-album singles
"Then Again"	2017	—	—	—	Non-album singles
"Ye's"	2017	—	—	—	Non-album singles
"Wiz Kelly"	2019	—	—	—	Non-album singles
"Don't Bend"	2019	—	—	—	Non-album singles
"10 A Brick"	2020	—	—	—	Non-album singles
"YES I CAN"	2021	—	—	—	Non-album singles
"—" denotes a recording that did not chart or was not released in that territory.

=== As featured artist ===
List of singles as featured artist, with selected chart positions and certifications, showing year released and album name
Title	Year	Peak chart positions			Certifications	Album
Title	Year	US	US R&B /HH	US Rap	Certifications	Album
"No Hands" (Waka Flocka Flame featuring Roscoe Dash and Wale)	2010	13	2	1	RIAA: Diamond	Flockaveli
"Turn It Up" (Mishon featuring Roscoe Dash)	2010	—	80	—		Non-album singles
"Haters" (Tony Yayo featuring 50 Cent, Shawty Lo and Roscoe Dash)	2011	—	— (Note: "Haters" did not enter the Hot R&B/Hip-Hop Songs chart, but peaked at number five on the Bubbling Under R&B/Hip-Hop Songs chart.)	—		Non-album singles
"Oh My" (DJ Drama featuring Fabolous, Roscoe Dash and Wiz Khalifa)	2011	95	18	12		Third Power
"Let It Fly" (Maino featuring Roscoe Dash)	2011	— (Note: "Let It Fly" did not enter the Billboard Hot 100, but peaked at number six on the Bubbling Under Hot 100 chart.)	57	—		The Day After Tomorrow
"Marvin & Chardonnay" (Big Sean featuring Kanye West and Roscoe Dash)	2011	32	1	4	RIAA: Platinum	Finally Famous
"Pride N Joy" (Fat Joe featuring Kanye West, Miguel, Jadakiss, Mos Def, DJ Khaled, Roscoe Dash and Busta Rhymes)	2012	—	81	—		Non-album single
"So Many Girls" (DJ Drama featuring Tyga, Wale and Roscoe Dash)	2013	90	30	—		Quality Street Music
"—" denotes a recording that did not chart or was not released in that territory.

== Guest appearances ==
List of non-single guest appearances, with other performing artists, showing year released and album name
Title	Year	Other artist(s)	Album
"I Wanna Rock" (Interstate Trafficking Remix)	2010	Snoop Dogg, Rick Ross, Yo Gotti, Maino, OJ Da Juiceman	none
"That's Her" (G-Mix)	2010	Lil Scrappy, B.o.B	none
"Go Crazy"	2010	Jim Jones	CapoLife
"I'm So Gone"	2010	Fast Life Yungstaz	Auto-Pilot
"What They Hatin’ 4"	2010	Lil Chuckee	Charles Lee Ray
"Fall Out"	2010	Reek Da Villian	The Gift
"Weight of the World"	2011	Jared Evan, Stat Quo	Back & Forth
"At the Top"	2011	Killer Mike	none
"Guest List"	2011	B.o.B	E.P.I.C. (Every Play Is Crucial)
"I Be Puttin' On"	2012	Wale, Wiz Khalifa, French Montana	Self Made Vol. 2
"Snapbacks and Tattoos" (Remix)	2012	Driicky Graham, Ca$h Out, French Montana	none
"Turnt"	2012	Waka Flocka Flame, Wale	Salute Me or Shoot Me 4 (Banned From America)
"He's from the A"	2012	Micole, The-Dream, Gucci Mane, DJ Drama	none
"Sexcapade"	2012	Lloyd	The Playboy Diaries
"One Night"	2013	Chinx Drugz, DJ Khaled, French Montana	Cocaine Riot 3
"I Own It"	2013	Dave East	Gemini
"Work"	2013	August Alsina	The Product 2
"Stay Trill (Mr. Bill Collector)"	2013	Trae Tha Truth, Krayzie Bone	I Am King
"4 the Record"	2015	Blaq Tuxedo	Red Flowerz EP
"Butterflies (Right Now)"	2025	Metro Boomin, Quavo	A Futuristic Summa

== Music videos ==
=== As lead artist ===
List of music videos as lead artist, showing year released and directors
Title	Year	Director(s)
"All the Way Turnt Up" (featuring Soulja Boy)	2010	Mickey Finnegan
"Show Out"	2010	R. Malcolm Jones
"Sexy Girl Anthem"	2011	G Visuals
"Good Good Night"	2011	G Visuals
"I Do" (featuring K'LA)	2011	Rik Cordero
"IDGAF"	2013	Ben 'B.' Epstein
"Everyday"	2013	Connor Milligan
"Get Down"	2013	Hyacinthe X
