= Maino discography =

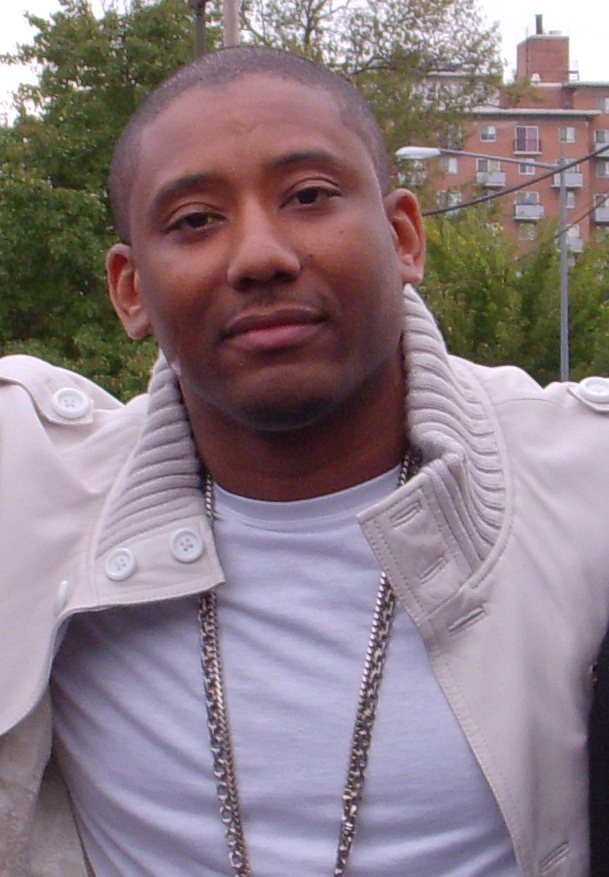
- Studio albums: 2
- Extended plays: 1
- Compilation albums: 1
- Singles: 9
- Music videos: 9
- Mixtapes: 13
- Promotional singles: 4

The discography of Maino, an American hip hop recording artist, consists of two studio albums, one compilation album, one extended play (EP), thirteen mixtapes, nine singles (including three as a featured artist), four promotional singles and nine music videos.

== Albums ==
=== Studio albums ===
List of studio albums, with selected chart positions
Title	Album details	Peak chart positions		
Title	Album details	US	US R&B/HH	US Rap
If Tomorrow Comes...	Released: June 30, 2009; Label: Hustle Hard, Atlantic; Format: CD, digital download	25	4	1
The Day After Tomorrow	Released: February 28, 2012; Label: Hustle Hard, E1, Atlantic; Format: CD, digital download	94	17	11

=== Collaborative albums ===
Title	Album details
The Lobby Boyz (with Jim Jones)	Released: May 27, 2022; Label: Lobby Boyz; Format: CD, digital download

=== Compilation albums ===
Title	Album details
The One and Only	Released: September 2, 2008; Label: BCD; Format: CD, digital download

== Extended plays ==
List of extended plays, with selected chart positions
Title	EP details	Peak chart positions
Title	EP details	US R&B/HH
Unstoppable	Released: January 29, 2010; Label: Hustle Hard, Atlantic; Format: CD, digital download	87
Keep It Rockin	Released: March 24, 2011; Label: Ellis Park; Format: Digital download	—
K.O.B. 2	Released: November 24, 2014; Label: Hustle Hard, Stage One; Format: Digital download	—

== Mixtapes ==
Title	Mixtape details
Real Recognize Real	Released: 2005; Label: Self-released; Format: Digital download
King of the City	Released: May 12, 2006; Label: Self-released; Format: Digital download
The Hand of God	Released: March 13, 2007; Label: Self-released; Format: Digital download
Brooklyn House, Pt. 1	Released: October 6, 2007; Label: Self-released; Format: Digital download
Tuck Ya Chain In	Released: February 8, 2008; Label: Self-released; Format: Digital download
Maino is the Future	Released: October 6, 2008; Label: Self-released; Format: Digital download
The Last Real Nigga Alive (And That's Real Talk)	Released: 2008; Label: Self-released; Format: Digital download
Black Flag City (The New Religion)	Released: March 20, 2009; Label: Self-released; Format: Digital download
Unstoppable (The Mixtape)	Released: September 21, 2009; Label: Self-released; Format: Digital download
The Art of War	Released: September 21, 2010; Label: Self-released; Format: Digital download
Respect The Jux	Released: August 8, 2011; Label: Self-released; Format: Digital download
I Am Who I Am	Released: January 26, 2012; Label: Self-released; Format: Digital download
The Mafia (with The Mafia)	Released: October 9, 2012; Label: Self-released; Format: Digital download
K.O.B.	Released: February 4, 2014; Label: Self-released; Format: Digital download
K.O.B. 3	Released: August 11, 2015; Label: Self-released; Format: Digital download
Maino Madness	Released: September 9, 2015; Label: Self-released; Format: Digital download
Yellow Tape (King Kong & Godzilla) (with Uncle Murda)	Released: March 25, 2016; Label: Self-released; Format: Digital download
K.O.B. Business	Released: November 30, 2016; Label: Self-released; Format: Digital download

== Singles ==
=== As lead artist ===
List of singles as lead artist, with selected chart positions and certifications, showing year released and album name
Title	Year	Peak chart positions			Certifications	Album
Title	Year	US	US R&B/HH	US Rap	Certifications	Album
"Hi Hater"^{[A]}	2008	108	26	16		If Tomorrow Comes...
"All the Above" (featuring T-Pain)	2009	39	59	10	RIAA: Platinum	If Tomorrow Comes...
"Million Bucks" (featuring Swizz Beatz)	2009	—	66	21		If Tomorrow Comes...
"Let It Fly"^{[B]} (featuring Roscoe Dash)	2011	106	57	—		The Day After Tomorrow
"That Could Be Us" (featuring Robbie Nova)	2011	—	57	—		The Day After Tomorrow
"Mobbin'" (featuring Waka Flocka Flame)	2012	—	—	—		Non-album single
"All These Hoes" (featuring Meek Mill and Yo Gotti)	2014	—	—	—		K.O.B. 2
"All Again" (featuring Macy Gray)	2019	—	—	—		TBA
"—" denotes a recording that did not chart or was not released in that territory.

=== As featured artist ===
List of singles as featured artist, showing year released and album name
Title	Year	Peaks	Album
Title	Year	US Dance	Album
"Professional" (Young Steff featuring Maino)	2008	—	Non-album single
"24/7 - 365" (Huey featuring Maino and Glasses Malone)	2008	—	Non-album single
"Checkin' My Fresh" (Kia Shine featuring Young Dro and Maino)	2009	—	2000 Shine
"Walk These Streets" (Rakim featuring Maino and Tracey Horton)	2009	—	The Seventh Seal
"Thug Luv" (DJ Kayslay featuring Maino, Papoose, Red Café and Ray J)	2010	—	More Than Just a DJ
"Keys to the City" (Razah featuring Maino and Jim Jones)	2010	—	Non-album singles
"Towards the Sky" (Billy Roads featuring Maino)	2010	—	Non-album singles
"Bedroom Swag" (Ron Browz featuring Maino)	2011	—	Non-album singles
"All Lies" (Charli Baltimore featuring Maino)	2012	—	Non-album singles
"Bout That Bread" (Ron Browz featuring Maino)	2013	—	Non-album singles
"Down" (Ray Lavender featuring Maino)	2013		Non-album singles
"Crazy" (Erika Jayne featuring Maino)	2015	1	Non-album singles
"No Bay-Bee (remix)" (La'Vega featuring Maino)	2019	—	Non-album singles

=== Promotional singles ===
List of promotional singles, with selected chart positions, showing year released and album name
Title	Year	Peak chart positions	Album
Title	Year	US R&B/HH	Album
"Stand Up (The Sean Bell Tribute Song)" (with Swizz Beatz, Cassidy, Styles P, Talib Kweli and Drag-On)	2008	—	Non-album single
"Hood Love" (featuring Trey Songz)	2009	—	If Tomorrow Comes...
"Bring It Back DJ"	2010	99	Non-album single
"Don't Say Nothin'"	2010	99	The Art of War
"—" denotes a recording that did not chart.

== Guest appearances ==
List of non-single guest appearances, with other performing artists, showing year released and album name
Title	Year	Other artist(s)	Album
"Gimme That"	2005	Lil' Kim	The Naked Truth
"Brooklyn 4 Life"	2006	Lil' Kim, Papoose	none
"We are the Streets"	2006	Papoose, Bun B, WC	The Best Of Papoose (The Mixtape)
"Brooklyn" (Remix)	2007	Joell Ortiz, Cashmere, Solomon, Big Daddy Kane	The Brick: Bodega Chronicles
"Cop-N-Go" (Remix)	2007	Skyzoo, Sha Stimuli	Corner Store Classic
"Realer"	2009	Raekwon	Staten Go Hard
"OJ Gloves"	2011	Tony Yayo	none
"Hand of God"	2011	DJ Drama	Third Power
"Salute Me"	2012	DJ Kay Slay, Fred the Godson, Styles P	Grown Man Hip-Hop
"Join the Mafia"	2012	DJ Kay Slay, A-Mafia	Grown Man Hip-Hop
"Castles In Brooklyn"	2012	David Banner	Sex, Drugs & Video Games
"Bleed the Same Blood"	2012	Busta Rhymes, Anthony Hamilton	Year of the Dragon
"Last Day"	2013	DJ Suss One, The Mafia	none
"To the Top"	2013	Raekwon	Lost Jewlry
"Dying to Live"	2013	DJ Kay Slay, Push Montana, Lucky Don	Grown Man Hip Hop Part 2 (Sleepin' With The Enemy)
"Candy Yams"	2013	Uncle Murda, Young Super Boii	The First 48
"No Reason"	2013	Yung Berg, Mia Rey, Jordan Hollywood	Genesis
"Beef wit Us"	2013	itsTheReal	Urbane Outfitters Vol. 1
"Real Mutha Fucka"	2013	Rich Boy, Hemi, Mista Raja	Break the Pot
"Pillow Talk"	2013	Gangsta Boo, 8Ball	It's Game Involved
"Crispy Hunneds"	2013	DJ Naim, Gunplay, Jim Jones, David Rush	I Got Now
"The Town"	2013	Vado, Lloyd Banks	Slime Flu 4
"Bust Your Gun"	2014	DJ Kay Slay, Mysonne, Sauce Money, Nathaniel	The Rise of a City
"Do It For the Hood 2"	2014	Red Café, Planet VI, Akon	American Psycho II
"If Words Could Kill"	2014	DJ Kay Slay, Trick-Trick, Tony Yayo	The Last Hip Hop Disciple
"Better Than"	2014	Joell Ortiz, Kaydence	House Slippers
"MMM (Remix)"	2015	Cassidy, Fred Money, Vado, Red Café, Papoose, J.R. Writer, Uncle Murda, Fat Trel, Fred the Godson, Chubby Jag, Drag-On, Dave East, Compton Menace	—N/a
"Welcome 2 Brooklyn"	2015	M.O.P.	Street Certified
"Ain't Coming Up Off Me"	2015	Termanology, Wais P	Term Brady - EP
"My Era"	2019	Jim Jones, Drama	El Capo

== Music videos ==
=== As lead artist ===
List of music videos, with directors, showing year released
Title	Year	Director(s)
"Hi Hater"	2008	Dan the Man
"Hi Hater" (Remix) (featuring Swizz Beatz, T.I., Plies, Jadakiss and Fabolous)	2008	Mazik Saevitz
"All The Above" (featuring T-Pain)	2009	Erik White
"Million Bucks" (featuring Swizz Beatz)	2009	Edwin Decena
"Gangsta" (featuring B.G.)	2010	none
"Let It Fly" (featuring Roscoe Dash)	2011	none
"That Could Be Us" (featuring Robbie Nova)	2012	Antwan Smith
"Mobbin" (featuring Waka Flocka Flame)	2012	Picture Perfect

=== As featured artist ===
List of music videos, with directors, showing year released
Title	Year	Director(s)
"Professional" (Young Steff featuring Maino)	2008	—
"Checkin' My Fresh" (Kia Shine featuring Young Dro and Maino)	2009	Kurt Williams
