= List of awards and nominations received by Big Sean =

Big Sean awards and nominations
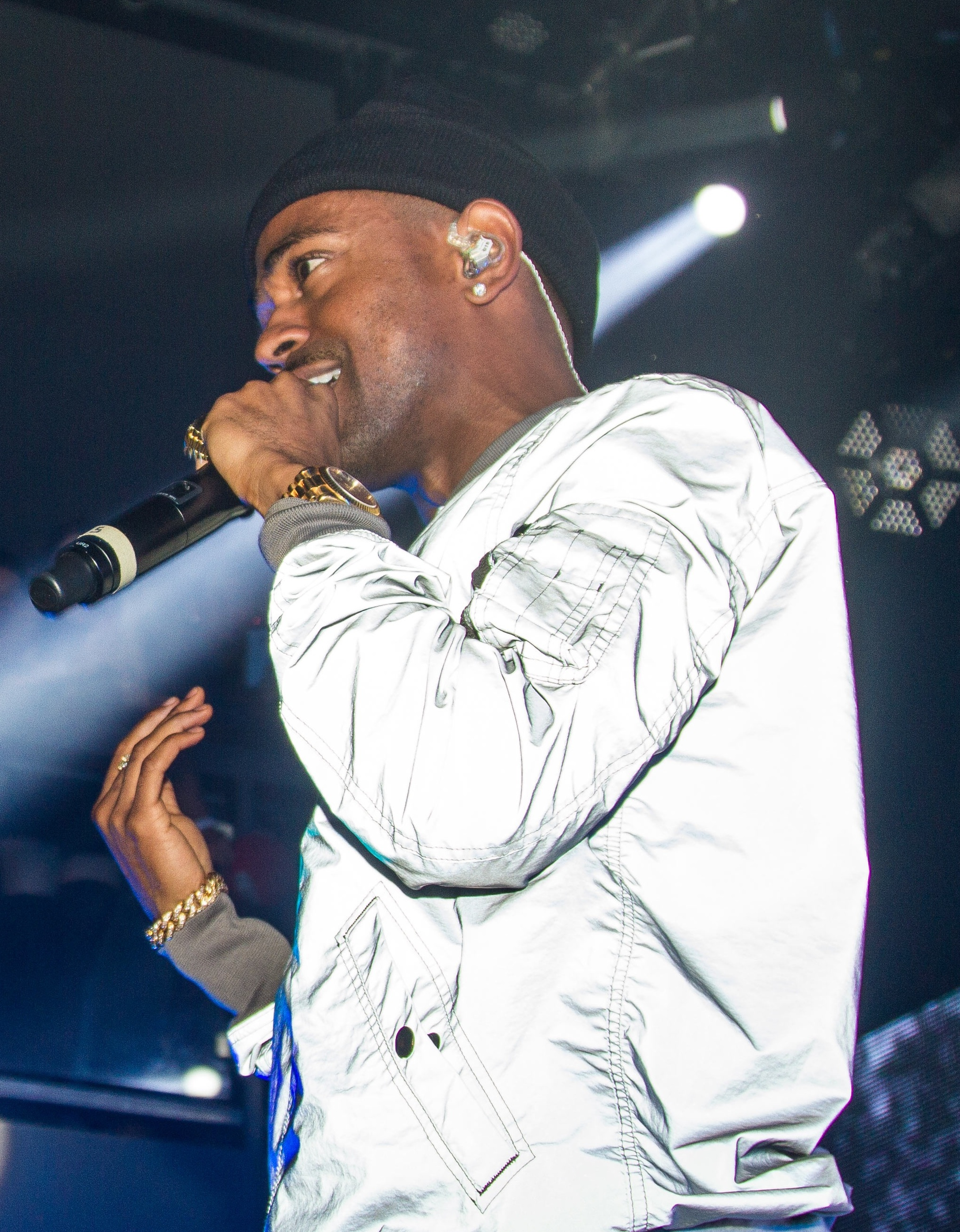
- Sean performing in 2015
Awards and nominations
| Award | Wins | Nominations |
| BET | 2 | 8 |
| Billboard | 0 | 3 |
| Grammy | 0 | 6 |
| MTV VMA | 2 | 6 |
| Detroit Music Awards | 0 | 4 |
| iHeartRadio Music Awards | 0 | 2 |

Totals (Note: Certain award groups do not simply award one winner. They acknowledge several different recipients, have runners-up, and have third place. Since this is a specific recognition and is different from losing an award, runner-up mentions are considered wins in this award tally. For simplification and to avoid errors, each award in this list has been presumed to have had a prior nomination.)
- Wins: 12
- Nominations: 55

Sean Michael Leonard "Big Sean" Anderson, is an American hip-hop recording artist. Over the years he has received or been nominated for numerous awards, starting with his debut album Finally Famous.

== ASCAP ==
=== ASCAP Pop Awards ===
| Year | Nominee / work | Category | Result | Ref. |
|---|---|---|---|---|
| 2018 | "Bounce Back" | Winning Songs | Won | |

== BET ==
=== BET Awards ===
| Year | Nominee / work | Category | Result | Ref. |
|---|---|---|---|---|
| 2012 | Himself | Best Male Hip-Hop Artist | Nominated | |
| 2012 | Himself | Best New Artist | Won | |
| 2012 | "Marvin & Chardonnay" (with Kanye West & Roscoe Dash) | Best Collaboration | Nominated | |
| 2015 | Himself | Best Male Hip-Hop Artist | Nominated | |
| 2015 | "I Don't Fuck with You" (with E-40) | Best Collaboration | Nominated | |
| 2015 | "I Don't Fuck with You" (with E-40) | Video of the Year | Nominated | |
| 2017 | Himself | Best Male Hip-Hop Artist | Nominated | |
| 2017 | "Bounce Back" | Video of the Year | Nominated | |

=== BET Hip Hop Awards ===
| Year | Nominee / work | Category | Result | Ref. |
|---|---|---|---|---|
| 2011 | Himself | Rookie of the year | Nominated | |
| 2011 | Finally Famous | Album of the Year | Nominated | |
| 2011 | "My Last" (with Chris Brown) | Best Hip-Hop Video | Nominated | |
| 2012 | "Mercy" (with Kanye West, Pusha T & 2 Chainz) | Best Hip-Hop Video | Nominated | |
| 2012 | "Mercy" (with Kanye West, Pusha T & 2 Chainz) | Best Club Banger | Nominated | |
| 2012 | "Mercy" (with Kanye West, Pusha T & 2 Chainz) | Reese's Perfect Combo Award | Won | |
| 2012 | Himself | Made You Look Award | Nominated | |
| 2013 | Detroit | Best Mixtape | Won | |
| 2015 | "I Don't Fuck with You" (with E-40) | Best Club Banger | Won | |
| 2015 | "I Don't Fuck with You" (with E-40) | Best Collabo, Duo or Group | Nominated | |
| 2015 | "Blessings" (with Drake & Kanye West) | Best Collabo, Duo or Group | Won | |
| 2015 | "Blessings" (with Drake & Kanye West) | People's Champ Award | Won | |
| 2015 | "Blessings" (with Drake & Kanye West) | Best Hip Hop Video | Nominated | |
| 2015 | "Play No Games" (with Chris Brown & Ty Dolla Sign) | Best Hip Hop Video | Nominated | |
| 2015 | Himself | Lyricist of the Year | Nominated | |
| 2015 | Himself | MVP of the Year | Nominated | |
| 2015 | Dark Sky Paradise | Album of the Year | Nominated | |
| 2015 | "One Man Can Change the World" (with Kanye West & John Legend) | Impact Track | Won | |
| 2018 | “Big Bank” (with Yg, 2 Chainz, Nicki Minaj) | Sweet 16: Best Featured Artist | Nominated | |
| 2020 | Big Sean | Best Live Performer | Nominated | |
| 2020 | Big Sean | Lyricist of the Year | Nominated | |

== Billboard Music Awards ==
| Year | Nominee / work | Category | Result | Ref. |
|---|---|---|---|---|
| 2012 | Himself | Top New Artist | Nominated | |
| 2013 | "Mercy" (with Kanye West, Pusha T & 2 Chainz) | Top Rap Song | Nominated | |
| 2015 | "I Don't Fuck With You" (with E-40) | Top Rap Song | Nominated | |

== Detroit Music Awards ==
| Year | Nominee / work | Award | Result | Ref. |
|---|---|---|---|---|
| 2017 | Twenty88 (with Jhené Aiko) | Detroit Music Award for Outstanding National Major Label Recording | Nominated | |
| 2017 | "Bounce Back" | Detroit Music Award for Outstanding National Single | Nominated | |
| 2017 | "No More Interviews" | Detroit Music Award for Outstanding Video / Major Budget | Nominated | |
| 2018 | "Bounce Back" | Detroit Music Award for Outstanding Video / Major Budget | Nominated | |

== Grammy Awards ==
To date, Big Sean has received six Grammy Award nominations.

| Year | Nominee / work | Category | Result | Ref. |
|---|---|---|---|---|
| 2013 | "Mercy" (with Kanye West, Pusha T & 2 Chainz) | Best Rap Song | Nominated | |
| 2013 | "Mercy" (with Kanye West, Pusha T & 2 Chainz) | Best Rap Performance | Nominated | |
| 2016 | "One Man Can Change the World" (with Kanye West & John Legend) | Best Rap/Sung Collaboration | Nominated | |
| 2017 | Purpose (as a featured artist) | Album of the Year | Nominated | |
| 2018 | "Bounce Back" | Best Rap Performance | Nominated | |
| 2021 | "Deep Reverence" (with Nipsey Hussle) | Best Rap Performance | Nominated | |

== iHeartRadio Music Awards ==
| Year | Nominee / work | Category | Result | Ref. |
|---|---|---|---|---|
| 2016 | "Blessings" (with Drake & Kanye West) | Hip Hop Song of the Year | Nominated | |
| 2016 | Himself | Hip Hop Artist of the Year | Nominated | |

== MTV ==
=== MTV Europe Music Awards ===
| Year | Nominee / work | Category | Result |
|---|---|---|---|
| 2012 | Himself | Best US Act | Nominated |

=== MTV Video Music Awards ===
| Year | Nominee / work | Category | Result | Ref. |
|---|---|---|---|---|
| 2011 | "My Last" | Best New Artist Video | Nominated | |
| 2015 | "I Don't Fuck with You" (with E-40) | Best Hip-Hop Video | Nominated | |
| 2015 | "One Man Can Change the World" (with Kanye West & John Legend) | Best Video with a Social Message | Won | |
| 2017 | "Bounce Back" | Best Hip-Hop Video | Nominated | |
| 2017 | "Feels" (with Calvin Harris, Pharrell Williams & Katy Perry) | Best Collaboration | Nominated | |
| 2017 | "Light" | Best Fight Against the System | Won | |

== People's Choice Awards ==
| Year | Nominee / work | Category | Result | Ref. |
|---|---|---|---|---|
| 2016 | Himself | Favorite Hip-Hop Artist | Nominated | |

== Soul Train Music Awards ==
| Year | Nominee / work | Category | Result | Ref. |
|---|---|---|---|---|
| 2012 | "Mercy" (with Kanye West, Pusha T & 2 Chainz) | Rhythm & Bars Award | Won | |
| 2015 | "I Don't Fuck with You" (with E-40) | Rhythm & Bars Award | Nominated | |
| 2015 | "Blessing" (with Drake & Kanye West) | Rhythm & Bars Award | Nominated | |
| 2015 | "Blessing" (with Drake & Kanye West) | Best Collaboration | Nominated | |

== NAACP Image Awards ==
| Year | Nominee / work | Category | Result | Ref. |
|---|---|---|---|---|
| 2016 | "One Man Can Change the World" (with Kanye West & John Legend) | Outstanding Duo, Group or Collaboration | Nominated | |
| 2021 | Himself | Outstanding Male Artist | Nominated | |
| 2021 | "Deep Reverence" (with Nipsey Hussle) | Outstanding Duo, Group or Collaboration (Contemporary) | Nominated | |
| 2021 | "Deep Reverence" (with Nipsey Hussle) | Outstanding Hip Hop/Rap Song | Nominated | |

== YouTube Music Awards ==
| Year | Nominee / work | Category | Result | Ref. |
|---|---|---|---|---|
| 2015 | Himself | 50 Artists to Watch | Won | |
