= Where the Cash At? =

Single by Swizz Beatz
- Released: 2008
- Recorded: 2008
- Genre: East Coast hip hop
- Length: 3:10
- Label: Full Surface
- Songwriters: Kasseem Dean, William Stanberry
- Producers: Swizz Beatz, Apex

Swizz Beatz singles chronology
"Candy Green" (2008)	"Where the Cash At?" (2008)	"Hi Hater (Remix)" (2008)

"Where the Cash At?", is a song by rapper/producer Swizz Beatz. Released as a street single, the song was set to appear on his album Life After the Party, now titled Haute Living. Swizz Beatz teamed up with "I Get Money" producer Apex for the production of the song.

== Music video ==
The music video is black and white and was directed by Parris. The video was exclusively premiered by 50 Cent 's website Thisis50.com on July 7, 2008. The video focuses on Swizz, rapping in different places, such as at a club, in a car and at his house.

== Other versions ==
The hard hitting production has been used by many rappers. Most notably, Lloyd Banks who entitled his version "Top 5", Jadakiss who renamed his "Child Abuse", The Riot Squad who featured Joe Budden and Stack Bundles on their version titled "You Know What'll Happen" and French Montana who recorded his song "17000", which takes shots at Jim Jones. Swizz Beatz former artist, Cassidy recorded a freestyle entitled "Where is Cass At?", in which he clears up where he's been. Wiz Khalifa also recorded a freestyle.
