= Vybe Beatz =

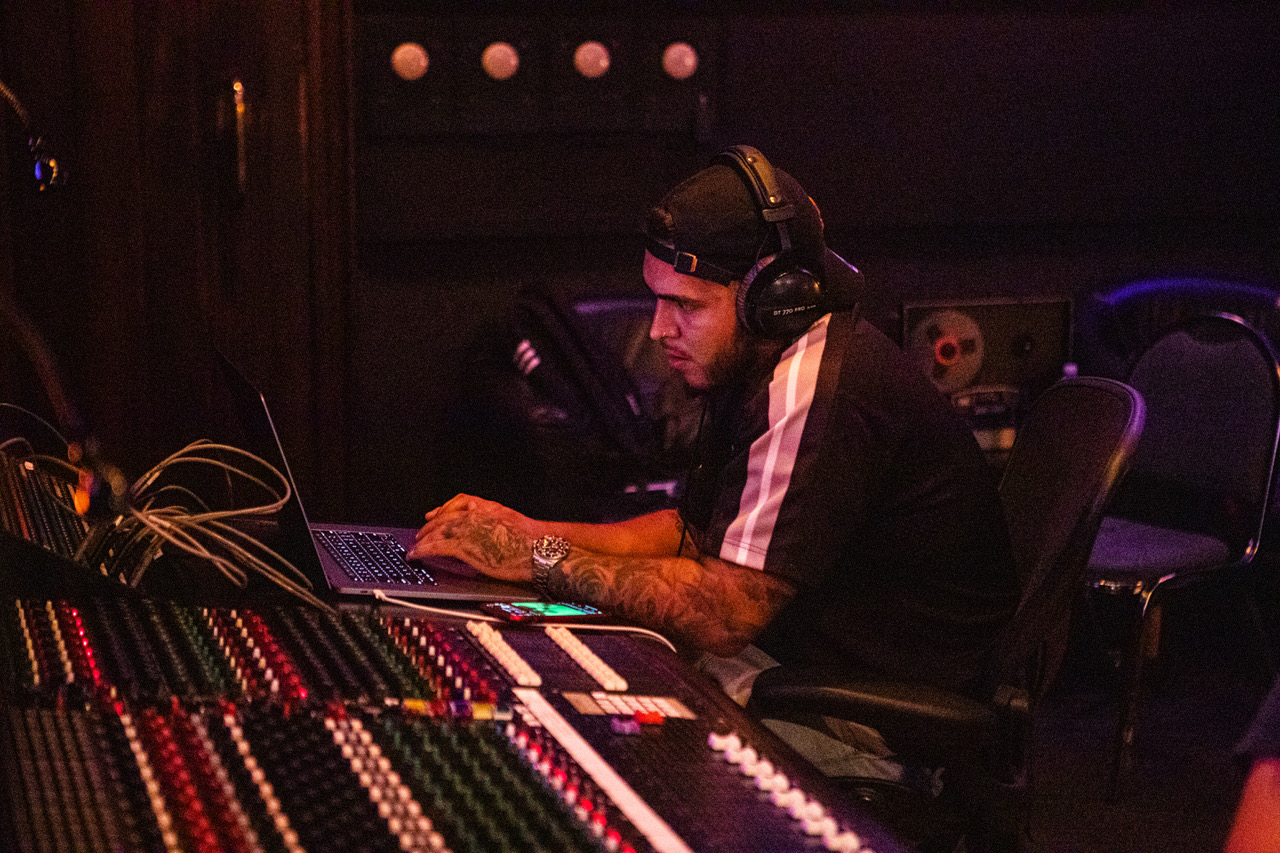
- Vybe Beatz in 2020

Background information
- Also known as: Vylib; Vybe Hitz
- Born: Christian Arceo; December 1, 1990 (age 35)
- Origin: San Jose, California, U.S.
- Genres: Hip hop
- Occupations: Record producer; audio engineer
- Instrument: FL Studio
- Years active: 2008–present
- Website: www.vybebeatz.com

Christian Arceo (born December 1, 1990), known professionally as Vybe Beatz, is an American record producer. He gained recognition on SoundClick in 2009, and has since produced songs for artists such as including Roscoe Dash, Travis Porter, Gunna, Young Thug, Lil Baby, Offset, Metro Boomin, and D-Block Europe.

== Early life ==
When Arceo was 13, he downloaded software programs off of Limewire, which is how he found the first Digital Audio WorkStation (DAW) Sony Acid. He was intrigued about composing music and did research on other DAW's including Fl Studio. He stayed up all day and night to create music.

== Career ==
Vybe was one of the first musicians to reach over 200 million plays on soundclick. and achieved mainstream success by producing the song "All The Way Turnt Up" by Roscoe Dash and Soulja Boy, which debuted on the Billboard Hot 100 at #100, peaked at #46, and reached #18 on Hot R&B/Hip-Hop Songs. A controversy started around this song once another rap group Travis Porter recorded an alternate version to this song using the production made by Vybe, and did not feature Dash as the main artist / writer. Because of this, Dash re-recorded the song, and even had another producer K.E. on the Track re-produce the instrumental, and Dash featured this as his single for his debut album with interscope records. Afterwards he worked independently with various artists and producers before relocating to Los Angeles in 2017. In 2018, Vybe made an appearance on Young Thug's album Slime Language, producing the track "Scoliosis", featuring Gunna and Lil Duke. which debuted at #8 on the US Billboard 200.

In February 2019, Vybe produced D-Block Europe's "Kitchen Kings", which peaked at #16 on the UK Albums Chart, while the overall album reached #2 with "Kitchen Kings" as the lead single.

== Production credits ==
=== 2009 ===
- Travis Porter - Streets R Us

17. "All The Way Turnt Up (ft. Roscoe Dash, YT)"

=== 2010 ===
- Chief Keef - Mulah Express

01. "100 Bail" (co-prod.: SuperStar O)

- G4 Boyz - Ballin' With No Deal

13. "G4 Shit (ft. Lil B)"

- Roscoe Dash - Ready Set Go!

02. "All The Way Turnt Up (ft. Soulja Boy)" (co-prod.: K.E. on the Track)

- Tity Boi - Me Against the World 2: Codeine Withdrawal

06. "Turn Up Freestyle"

- Yo Gotti - Cocaine Muzik 4.5: Da Documentary

11. "Make It Work"

=== 2011 ===
- French Montana - Cocaine & Caviar 2

02. "Mr. Miyagi"

- Maceo - Mexico City

12. "Trippin Again"
14. "Dopeboy Music (ft. Young Scooter, Future)" (co-prod.: Yung Exclusive)

- Snow Tha Product - Unorthodox

04. "Woke Wednesday" (co-prod.: SuperStar O)

=== 2013 ===
- Big Hookz

"Keep Talkin (ft. Styles P)"

- Blake Selby

"Never Let Go (ft. Twista, Sam Kay)"

=== 2014 ===
- Cam'ron - 1st Of The Month, Vol. 1

01. "Other Side (ft Sen City)" (co-prod.: SuperStar O)

=== 2015 ===
- Zoey Dollaz

"Pool Party (ft. Jim Jones)"

=== 2016 ===
- Benjah - Woke

10. "Illegal" (co-prod.: Benjah)
11. "My Everything" (co-prod.: Benjah)

- Mozzy - Lil Timothy n’ Thingz

09. "Leenya" (co-prod.: SuperStar O)

- Trouble - The Return of December 17th

11. "She Need It (ft. Tyree)"

- YBS Skola - No Pen Just Paper: Reloaded

06. "Baby Girl"

=== 2017 ===
- Snow Tha Product

"NoMore (ft. LexTheGreat)"

- Soldier Kidd - All Eyez On Me

11. "Grand Theft Auto" (co-prod.: KidTerror)

=== 2018 ===
- Young Thug - Slime Language

09. "Scoliosis (ft. Gunna, Lil Duke)" (co-prod.: Mattazik Muzik, Smoke, Aviator Keyyz)

=== 2019 ===
- D. Myke

"Dipped In Butter (ft. Fatboy SSE)"

- D-Block Europe - Home Alone

02. "Kitchen Kings" (co-prod.: KidTerror)

- Kid Ink

Rich" (co-prod.: Shaq Gonzoe)

- Lil Poppa - Almost Normal

11. "John Wick (ft. Neno Calvin)" (co-prod.: IndiaGotThemBeats)

- Tcrook$ - Pay Homage

04. "Tug-O-War"
06. "Bigger Picture (ft. OMB Peezy)"
11. "PaperCuts"

=== 2020 ===
- Blac Chyna

"My Word (ft. Too $hort, Keak Da Sneak)"

=== 2021 ===
- 28AV - Czarleo

09. "Twin Chops (ft. Sada Baby)"

=== 2022 ===
- Bobby Shmurda & LouGotCash - SHMURDAGOTCASH

03. "GC TO THE SHMURDA" (co-prod.: Lee on the Beats)

=== 2023 ===
- Mac J - I Shoulda Been Dropped This

02. "Engine Ina Trunk (ft. Philthy Rich)" (co-prod.: MigL Beats)

== Production equipment and style ==
Vybe likes to keep his studio equipment simple yet efficient, he uses an Akai Professional Advance 49 Keyboard, Yamaha HS8's Studio monitors, Beyerdynamic DT 770 studio headphones, and various software plugins which includes Kontakt, Massive, and Keyscape. Vybe's style is described as versatile, smooth, melodic, bass, and bounce which also includes his popular "Vibe" producer tag which was originally sampled from a 2007 Pontiac Vibe commercial.

== Influences ==
Aside from him inspiring himself to make good music, Vybe stated his influences comes from Scott Storch, & The Runners.
