= Decena =

Decena is a surname. Notable people with the surname include:

- Arturo Guzmán Decena (1976–2002), Mexican officer
- Eduardo Decena (1926–2002), Filipino basketball player
- Edwin Decena, American film director
