= My Own Step =

Single by Roscoe Dash featuring T-Pain and Fabo

from the album Step Up 3D (Original Motion Picture Soundtrack)
- Released: July 13, 2010
- Recorded: 2010
- Genre: Hip hop
- Length: 4:12
- Label: MMI, Zone 4, MusicLine Group
- Songwriters: Jeffrey Johnson; Faheem Najm; Kevin Erondu; Jamal Jones; Donell Prince
- Producers: Don P; Polow da Don

Roscoe Dash singles chronology
"Show Out" (2010)	"My Own Step" (2010)	"No Hands" (2010)

"My Own Step" is a song by American rapper and singer Roscoe Dash, released by Zone 4 and Interscope Records on July 13, 2010, as the sixth single from the Step Up 3D soundtrack. The song, produced by Don P of Trillville and Zone 4 label founder Polow da Don, features D4L member Fabo and singer T-Pain.

== Background ==
The song is featured in the movie Step Up 3D, and is the second on the soundtrack's track listing. Disney was originally looking for songs for the movie and found the original version of "My Own Step" which was sung by rapper YV and featured T-Pain, Fabo and Polow Da Don. When they found the song, they convinced Roscoe Dash to be on it, and kept R&B singer T-Pain and Fabo on the track.

== Music video ==
The music video was released on July 13, 2010. Clips from the film are interspersed throughout, and it contains a cameo appearance from Young Money Entertainment rapper Lil Chuckee.

== Charts ==
Chart (2010)	Peak position
U.S. Billboard Hot R&B/Hip-Hop Songs	89
