= I Do It =

I Do It may refer to:

- "I Do It" (Big Sean song), 2011
- "I Do It" (2 Chainz song), 2013
- "I Do It" (Lil Wayne song), 2020
