= Step Up 3D (soundtrack) =

Step Up 3D (Original Motion Picture Soundtrack)

Soundtrack album by Various artists
- Released: July 27, 2010
- Genres: Dance, hip hop
- Label: Atlantic

Singles from Step Up 3D
- 1. "Freak" Released: February 26, 2010; 2. "This Girl" Released: April 26, 2010; 3. "Already Taken" Released: May 18, 2010; 4. "This Instant" Released: June 1, 2010; 5. "Club Can't Handle Me" Released: June 28, 2010; 6. "My Own Step" Released: July 13, 2010; 7. "Irresistible" Released: July 27, 2010

Step Up 3D (Original Motion Picture Soundtrack) is the film soundtrack for the film Step Up 3D. It was released on July 27, 2010, by Atlantic Records.

== Track listing ==
No.	Title	Writer(s)	Producer(s)	Length
1.	"Club Can't Handle Me" (Flo Rida featuring David Guetta)	Carmen Michelle Key; Kasia Livingston; David Guetta; Fred Riesterer; Giorgio Tuinfort; Mike Caren; Tramar Dillard	David Guetta	3:52
2.	"My Own Step (Theme from Step Up 3D)" (Roscoe Dash featuring T-Pain & Fabo)	Roscoe Dash; Faheem Najm; Kevin Erondu	Don P	4:17
3.	"This Instant" (Sophia Fresh featuring T-Pain)	Faheem Najm; Justin Henderson; Nyesha Williams; George Kranz; Christopher Whiteacre	Tha Bizness	3:54
4.	"Already Taken" (Trey Songz)	Jamal Jones; Ester Dean; Alja Jackson; Jason Perry; Tremaine Neverson	Polow da Don	3:58
5.	"This Girl" (Laza Morgan)	Julian Bunetta; Otiya Morgan; Scott Mehner	Julian Bunetta	3:09
6.	"Fancy Footwork" (Chromeo)	David Macklovitch; Patrick Gemayel	Chromeo	3:18
7.	"Beggin'" (Madcon)	Bob Gaudio; Peggy Farina	Hitesh Ceon; Kim Ofstad; Jonny Sjo	3:38
8.	"Up" (Jesse McCartney featuring Dapo)	Dapo Torimiro; Dean	Dapo	2:43
9.	"Bust Your Windows" (Jazmine Sullivan)	Jazmine Sullivan; Salaam Remi; DeAndre Way	Salaam Remi	4:26
10.	"Freak" (Estelle featuring Kardinal Offishall)	Estelle Swaray; Jason Harrow; Guetta; Nick Van De Wall; Ruben Fernhout; Beresford Romeo	David Guetta; Afrojack	3:41
11.	"Whatchadoin?" (N.A.S.A. featuring M.I.A., Spank Rock, Santigold and Nick Zinner)	Sam Spiegel; José Pinheiro; Castanho Hanrique; Naveen Hanks; Clemente De Dues	Squeak E. Clean	4:10
12.	"Tear da Roof Off" (Busta Rhymes)	Kasseem Dean; Trevor Tahiem Smith Jr.	Swizz Beatz	3:37
13.	"Move (If You Wanna)" (Mims)	Shawn Mims; Marcos Palacios; Ernest Clark	Da Internz	3:11
14.	"Shawty Got Moves" (Get Cool)	Willie C. Poole	Get Cool	3:14
15.	"Irresistible" (Wisin & Yandel)	Juan Luis Morena; Llandel Veguilla; Marcos Masís	Tainy; Victor El Nasi	3:06
16.	"No te Quiero" (Sophia Del Carmen featuring Pitbull)	Mauricio Gasca; Yoel Henriquez; Sophia Del Carmen	Mauricio Gasca; Yoel Henriquez	3:27

United States bonus track(s)
No.	Title	Producer(s)	Length
14.	"Beggin'" (Madcon)	3Elementz	3:35
15.	"Who You Are" (Jessie J)	Toby Gad	4:26

Digital deluxe version bonus track(s)
No.	Title	Producer(s)	Length
14.	"Beggin'" (Madcon)	3Elementz	3:35
15.	"Who You Are" (Jessie J)	Toby Gad	3:26
16.	"Got Your Back" (T.I. featuring Keri Hilson)	DJ Toomp	4:00
17.	"Let Me C It" (Get Cool featuring Petey Pablo)		3:32
18.	"Spirit of the Radio" (J. Randall)		2:59
19.	"Work the Middle" (Ericka June)		3:39

=== Tracks not listed ===
There are many tracks that were not listed in the soundtrack.

== Charts ==
=== Weekly charts ===
Chart (2010)	Peak position
Australian Albums (ARIA)	10
Austrian Albums (Ö3 Austria)	2
Belgian Albums (Ultratop Flanders)	4
Belgian Albums (Ultratop Wallonia)	31
Canadian Albums (Billboard)	8
Danish Albums (Hitlisten)	39
Dutch Albums (Album Top 100)	80
French Albums (SNEP)	45
German Albums (Offizielle Top 100)	14
New Zealand Albums (RMNZ)	7
Swiss Albums (Schweizer Hitparade)	6
US Billboard 200	29
US Top R&B/Hip-Hop Albums (Billboard)	7
US Soundtrack Albums (Billboard)	2

=== Year-end charts ===
Chart (2010)	Position
Austrian Albums (Ö3 Austria)	74
Swiss Albums (Schweizer Hitparade)	80
US Top R&B/Hip-Hop Albums (Billboard)	91
