= Show Out (Roscoe Dash song) =

Single by Roscoe Dash

from the album Ready Set Go!
- Released: March 23, 2010
- Genre: Hip hop
- Length: 3:23
- Label: MMI, Zone 4, MusicLine Group, Interscope
- Songwriters: Jeffrey Johnson, Kevin Erondu
- Producer: K.E. on the Track

Roscoe Dash singles chronology
"All the Way Turnt Up" (2010)	"Show Out" (2010)	"My Own Step" (2010)

"Show Out" is a song by American hip hop recording artist Roscoe Dash, released as the second single from his debut album Ready Set Go! (2010). It was written by Dash, alongside Kevin Erondu, who produced the song. It was released for digital download on March 23, 2010.

== Background and composition ==
"Show Out"
A 30-second sample of "Show Out"

When asked about the song in an interview with Popeater, Dash commented, "'Showing Out' means anything that you do, you do it big -- you're 'Showing Out'". In an interview with MTV News, Dash said,

"'Turnt Up' was kind of like my get-your-foot-in-the-door record and video, and I kinda, like, put that motivational message into 'Turnt Up'. But 'Show Out' is kinda like that have-fun, wild-out, it's-the-summertime, do-what-you-want-to-do type of record."

Dash also confirmed that American singer Chris Brown, was initially supposed to be featured on "Show Out", but Dash said that he wouldn't push a remix until the song had peaked, stating: "It's gonna take time for all of that. I'd rather get something that's gonna be quick that we can go ahead and throw out there early." The song was featured in the film Stomp the Yard 2: Homecoming.

== Music video ==
In an interview with AllHipHop in March 2010, Dash confirmed that a video for the song would be shot near the end of the month. Later, Dash told MTV News,

"The video is going to speak for itself, I think, because we got a lot of summertime things going on. Hopefully it'll be the video of the summer and next summer and the summer after that. It didn't even seem like we were shooting a video," Dash said. "It really was like we was just out there having fun and the cameras just happened to be there."

The video features Dash in scenes with flashy cars, bikes, and riding a jet ski. Mawuse Ziegbe of MTV News referred to the video as having a "visual smorgasbord of summertime stuntin".

== Charts ==
Chart (2010)	Peak position
US Hot R&B/Hip-Hop Songs	41
US Hot Rap Songs	22

== Release history ==
Region	Date	Format
United States	March 23, 2010	Digital download
