= Already Taken =

Single by Trey Songz

from the album Step Up 3D OST
- Released: May 18, 2010
- Recorded: 2010
- Genre: R&B
- Length: 4:03
- Label: Atlantic Records
- Songwriters: Tremaine Neverson; Ester Dean; Jamal Jones; Alja Jackson; Jason Perry
- Producer: Polow da Don

"Already Taken" is a song by American R&B singer Trey Songz. It was released as a digital download on iTunes on June 30, 2010, as a single from the Step Up 3D soundtrack album and is also a bonus track on Trey Songz fourth album, Passion, Pain & Pleasure. A music video was shot and released on July 27, 2010.

== Background ==
Trey Songz started working on the song with mentor Shaliek Powell in 2010. The producer of Step Up 3D wanted Trey to contribute to the new soundtrack, because he had also done a couple of songs for the soundtrack of the Step Up series. Trey can be seen working on the song in an episode of his documentary series on BET entitled Trey Songz: My Moment.

It is also worth mentioning that R&B singer R. Kelly also has a version of the song that leaked on YouTube in 2010, possibly a demo for Trey Songz.

== Reception ==
The song received heavy airplay and the video was played heavily on TV, mainly by BET. It peaked at number 39 on the R&B/Hip Hop charts.

== Live Performances ==
Trey Songz performed "Already Taken" live on the Jimmy Fallon show August 2, 2010.

== Music video ==
A music video was shot and was directed by Philip Andelman. The video shows off the skills of dancers and their styles, along with Trey Songz singing and being passionate with the leading lady in the video, Helen Gedlu, who also happens to be his ex-girlfriend. The video premiered via www.treysongz.com on July 27, 2010. It also reached number #1 on the BET's 106 & Park countdown.

== Charts ==
Chart performance for Already Taken
Chart (2010)	Peak position
UK Singles (Official Charts)	79
UK Singles Downloads (Official Charts)	78
UK Hip Hop/R&B (Official Charts)	29
