= You the Boss =

Single by Rick Ross featuring Nicki Minaj
- Released: October 7, 2011
- Recorded: 2009–11
- Genre: Hip hop
- Length: 4:40
- Label: Maybach Music Group; Def Jam; Slip-n-Slide
- Songwriters: Onika Maraj; William Leonard Roberts II; Kevin Erondu
- Producer: K.E

Rick Ross singles chronology
"Fly Together" (2011)	"You the Boss" (2011)	"I Love My Bitches" (2011)

Nicki Minaj singles chronology
"Fireball" (2011)	""You the Boss"" (2011)	"Make Me Proud" (2011)

"You the Boss" is a song by American rapper Rick Ross featuring American rapper Nicki Minaj. The song was produced by K.E. on the Track and originally intended to serve as the lead single from Ross's fifth studio album, God Forgives, I Don't (2012); the song was later taken off the final tracklist. The song was certified Gold by the Recording Industry Association of America in September 2014.

== Background ==
While on the set of filming the music video for Birdman's "Y.U. Mad", Nicki Minaj revealed to MTV that "You the Boss" was originally written and recorded in 2009 for Lil Wayne, but he passed on it. "It was just lingering, and then she gave it to Rick Ross" Minaj said while in character as her alter ego, the Female Weezy. Ross too had initially passed on the record while recording Teflon Don.

== Charts ==
=== Weekly charts ===
Chart (2011–2012)	Peak position
US Billboard Hot 100	62
US Hot R&B/Hip-Hop Songs (Billboard)	5
US Rap Songs (Billboard)	10

=== Year-end charts ===
Chart (2012)	Position
US Hot R&B/Hip-Hop Songs (Billboard)	37
US Rap Songs (Billboard)	33
US Ringtones (Billboard)	26

== Certifications ==
Region	Certification	Certified units/sales
United States (RIAA)	Gold	500,000^{‡}
^{‡} Sales+streaming figures based on certification alone.

== Release information ==
Country	Date	Format	Label	Ref
United States	October 7, 2011	Digital download	Def Jam Recordings	
United States	October 18, 2011	Radio airplay	Def Jam Recordings	
