= I Do It (Big Sean song) =

Promotional single by Big Sean

from the album Finally Famous
- Released: May 10, 2011
- Recorded: 2011
- Genre: Hip hop
- Length: 3:35
- Label: GOOD Music; Def Jam
- Songwriters: Sean Anderson; Dion Wilson; Samuel Lindley
- Producers: No I.D.; The Legendary Traxster

"I Do It" is a song by American hip-hop artist Big Sean, released via digital download as the first promotional single from his debut album Finally Famous (2011).

== Composition ==
The track was produced by No I.D. and The Legendary Traxster. The lyrics "I'm high, I split an O in half, now it's a parenthesis" were quoted from Pat Piff's song "You Already Know".

== Critical reception ==
Consequence of Sound wrote of the song that: "the delivery by Big Sean, manic, almost cartoon-ish in nature, and the beat, this bizarro bump that feels like the best-worst parts of old horror movie soundtracks cut together, work to make it vibrant and appealing, even if it feels overdone". HipHopDX noted that "I Do It" and fellow album track "My Last" both "showcase Sean's signature bravado and punchlines".

== Chart performance ==
Upon the release of its parent album, "I Do It" debuted at number 99 on the US Hot R&B/Hip-Hop Songs chart and rose to its peak of number 92 the following week.

== Music video ==
On June 14, 2011, the official music video for the track was released.

== Charts ==
Chart (2011)	Peak position
US Hot R&B/Hip-Hop Songs (Billboard)	92

== Certifications ==
Region	Certification	Certified units/sales
United States (RIAA)	Gold	500,000^{‡}
^{‡} Sales+streaming figures based on certification alone.
