= Good Good Night =

Single by Roscoe Dash

from the album J.U.I.C.E.
- Released: October 4, 2011
- Genre: Hip hop
- Length: 3:25
- Label: MMI; Zone 4; MusicLine Group; Geffen; Interscope
- Songwriters: Jeffery Johnson, Jr.; Tony Scales; Daniel Johnson; Jeremy Coleman; Torrey Hood; L. Sylvers
- Producer: Kane Beatz

Roscoe Dash singles chronology
"Marvin & Chardonnay" (2011)	"Good Good Night" (2011)	"Into The Morning" (2012)

"Good Good Night" (explicitly known as "Good Fucking Night") is a song by American hip hop recording artist Roscoe Dash. The song, which was released on October 4, 2011, serves as the lead single for his debut extended play (EP) J.U.I.C.E.. The track was produced by Kane Beatz.

== Music video ==
A music video for the song was released on Dash's Vevo and YouTube accounts on September 29, 2011. It was directed by G Visuals. MusicLine labelmate, American singer J. Holiday made a cameo appearance.

== Charts ==
Chart (2011)	Peak position
US Billboard Hot 100	91
US Hot R&B/Hip-Hop Songs (Billboard)	44
US Hot Rap Songs (Billboard)	21
US Rhythmic Airplay (Billboard)	23

== Release history ==
Region	Date	Format	Label	Ref.
United States	October 4, 2011	Digital download	Music Line; Geffen	
