= Ready Set Go! =

Studio album by Roscoe Dash
- Released: November 2, 2010 (via Walmart)
- Recorded: Various recording locations, 2009–10
- Genres: Hip-hop; R&B; pop; pop rap; crunk
- Length: 32:20
- Labels: MMI; Music Line; Zone 4; Interscope
- Producers: Lavour Sanders; Anthony Tate; Vybe Beatz; K.E. on the Track; DJ Spinz; Big Fruit; Bigg Makk; Chef Tone; Los Da Mystro

Roscoe Dash chronology
Ready Set Go! (2010)	J.U.I.C.E. (2011)

Singles from Ready Set Go!
- 1. "All the Way Turnt Up" Released: January 26, 2010; 2. "Show Out" Released: March 23, 2010

Professional ratings
Review scores
Source	Rating
AllMusic	2.5/5 stars

Ready Set Go! is the debut studio album (Note: Due to Ready Set Go! being released in an unfinished state, Dash considers his 2011 EP, J.U.I.C.E., his debut album.) by the American rapper Roscoe Dash, released on November 2, 2010, through MMI (Making Moves Incorporated), Music Line Group, Zone 4, and Interscope Records. The album contains guest performances from Soulja Boy, J. Holiday, and Jared Evan. Recording for the album occurred in various locations during 2009 and 2010, with production primarily provided by K.E. on the Track. A hip-hop album with influences of pop and contemporary R&B, Ready Set Go! features hook-driven, lighthearted lyrical content sung by Dash's high-pitched, nasal voice.

The album was preceded by the release of the singles "All the Way Turnt Up" and "Show Out"; the former peaked at number 46 on the Billboard Hot 100. The album was leaked to retailer Walmart before Dash had finished recording it, leading to the album being initially pulled from all other retailers, although some have since retrospectively made it available. Most likely due to this, the album failed to chart in any known territory. Its premature release has since led Dash to disown the album, as he does not regard it as his definitive debut.

== Background and recording ==
Roscoe Dash was born Jeffrey Johnson, Jr., and lived in Atlanta, Georgia, with his mother and grandmother. He gained his interest in hip-hop from his brother, an aspiring music producer: he began writing lyrics of his own at twelve years old, under the name "ATL", and joined a four-man group called The Blackout Boys. After releasing mixtapes both with the group and as a solo artist, Dash nearly signed to record label Porter House, the label of Travis Porter – friends of Dash since 2006 – but this fell through after the two fell out following a credits dispute over an early version of Dash's later single "All the Way Turnt Up". He then met local entrepreneur L.A. da Boomman in 2009, who then signed him to his production company, Making Moves Inc. (MMI). Dash then later agreed to deals with both Music Line Group, after Boomman introduced Dash to the A&R representative Anthony Tate, and the Interscope-distributed Zone 4 after Tate and Dash spoke with music producer Polow da Don, the label's founder.

In an interview with Amazon, Dash explained that he intended to record music for Ready Set Go! that "everyone can relate to"; as well as to "be different and bring a new sound". Production was reported to be provided by K.E. on the Track, Polow da Don, and Vybe Beatz. Guest appearances on the album were provided by American rapper Soulja Boy, who appears on "All the Way Turnt Up", and singers J. Holiday and Jared Evan, who appear on "Yes Girl" and "All I Know", respectively. Dash later reported to MTV that he had recorded a song with American singer Chris Brown for Ready Set Go! in Los Angeles, on which the two "make magic". However, the album originally would have included other reported songs such as "Pop a Bottle" featuring Jeezy, and "Elevator Love" featuring Jazmine Sullivan, but those songs with collaborations do not appear on the final track listing.

== Music and lyrics ==
Primarily a hip-hop album, Ready Set Go! also contains influences of pop and contemporary R&B and consists of themes aimed primarily at a young demographic, including partying and popular product brands. Much of the album's production is provided by K.E. on the Track, whose production on the title track draws influences from "Indian Flute" by Timbaland & Magoo. "I Be Shopping" contains numerous examples of product placement, backed by a "memorable melody", which David Jeffries of AllMusic argues broadens the song's "appeal beyond mall rats". Dash described "All the Way Turnt Up" as "new-age crunk": Soulja Boy, the song's guest, likened it to a stylistically exaggerated version of his own single "Turn My Swag On". "Show Out" contains an infectious chorus and was described by Amazon as a "flashy, soon-to-be club anthem". Typically, Dash exhibits a nasal, high-pitched delivery that frequently displays signs of being digitally altered and layered "as if there were 20 Dashes per track, whining and echoing as far as the ear can hear".

== Release and promotion ==
Ready Set Go! was released via MMI, Zone 4, Music Line Group, and Interscope Records. MTV originally reported that the album would be released on May 11, 2010, although Billboard later claimed that the album would be released on June 1, 2010. It was then pushed back to November 2, 2010, but the album was leaked to American retailer Walmart prior to its release – it was also unfinished, as Dash intended to add additional material. Although the unfinished album was then officially distributed through Walmart on November 2, the album was not sent to any other retailers on the same date, although it can now be bought via Amazon, eBay and, in Denmark and Ireland, via the iTunes Store, although not in the United States. Although a release to additional retailers was reported to take place on March 29, 2011, this never materialized. In an interview with Billboard, Dash would remark that he no longer regarded Ready Set Go! as his debut album following its leaking, preferring his debut extended play J.U.I.C.E. (2011).

Two singles were released to promote Ready Set Go!. Dash originally purchased the production for "All the Way Turnt Up", the first single, via Vybe Beatz's SoundClick page. After Dash had recorded the original version of the song, he played it to hip-hop group Travis Porter, who wished to appear on it and duly recorded a new version of the song. However, after Travis Porter incorrectly credited him as a guest on the song instead of the lead when it appeared on Travis Porter's mixtape I'm a Differenter 2 (and subsequently performed it without him on numerous occasions), Dash fell out with the group after their promises to rectify the error did not materialize and removed them from the song. On the advice of L.A. da Boomman, Dash then requested rapper Soulja Boy record a verse from a song, who was so desperate to perform on the song that he protested his case via Twitter to make the appearance. The final version, which features additional production from K.E. on the Track, was released to digital retailers on January 22, 2010, and reached number 46 on the Billboard Hot 100, number 18 on the Hot R&B/Hip-Hop Songs chart, and number 8 on the Hot Rap Songs chart. The second single, "Show Out", was released digitally on April 20, 2010. It did not match the commercial performance of its predecessor, only reaching numbers 41 and 22 on the Hot R&B/Hip-Hop Songs and Hot Rap Songs charts. The music video for "All the Way Turnt Up" was filmed in an Atlanta warehouse and released via MTV Jams on February 22, 2010, with the video for "Show Out" featuring shots of Dash among expensive cars and riding a Jet Ski.

Although it was not released as a single, "Sexy Girl Anthem" peaked at number 71 on the Hot R&B/Hip-Hop Songs chart.

== Track listing ==
Ready Set Go! track listing
No.	Title	Writer(s)	Producer(s)	Length
1.	"Ready Set Go"	Jeffery Johnson Jr.; Kevin Erondu	K.E.	3:47
2.	"All the Way Turnt Up" (featuring Soulja Boy)	Johnson; DeAndre Way; Christian Arceo; Erondu	Vybe Beatz; K.E.	4:53
3.	"Show Out"	Johnson; Erondu	K.E.	3:21
4.	"Sexy Girl Anthem"	Johnson; Kevin Mays	DJ Spinz	3:10
5.	"Yes Girl" (featuring J. Holiday)	Johnson; Nahum Grymes; Leland Clopton	Big Fruit	3:14
6.	"One Night Stand"	Johnson; Bigg Makk; Tony Scales	Bigg Makk; Chef Tone	3:58
7.	"Employee of the Year"	Johnson; Los Da Mystro	Los Da Mystro	3:39
8.	"I Be Shopping"	Johnson; Erondu	K.E.	3:19
9.	"All I Know" (featuring Jared Evan)	Johnson; Erondu; Jared Evan	K.E.	4:17
Total length:				32:20

== Personnel ==
Credits for Ready Set Go! adapted from AllMusic.

- Christian Arceo – composer
- Jenelle Bellinger – A&R
- Bigg Makk – composer, producer
- Terrence Cash – mixing
- Leland "Big Fruit" Clopton – composer, producer
- Los Da Mystro – composer, producer
- DJ Spinz – composer, producer
- Kevin "K.E." Erondu – composer, engineer, producer
- Jared Evan – composer, featured artist
- Cliff Feiman – production supervisor
- Yvette Gayle – publicity
- John Gowen – engineer, mixing
- J. Holiday – featured artist
- Jeffery "Roscoe Dash" Johnson – primary artist, composer
- Mike Johnson – engineer
- Tiffany Johnson – marketing
- Kaylee – art direction, design
- Hannibal Matthews – photography
- Krista Michalski – staff
- Nick Miller – marketing
- Scott Naughton – engineer, mixing
- Terrence Nelson – A&R
- Lavour "L.A." Sanders – executive producer
- Tony "Chef Tone" Scales – composer, producer
- Glenn Schick – mastering
- Robert "Kaspa" Smith – marketing, promoter
- Mike Snodgress – marketing coordinator
- DeAndre "Soulja Boy" Way – composer, featured artist
- Anthony "T.A." Tate – A&R, executive producer
- Mia A. Welsh – staff
- Clay West – marketing, promoter
- Ianthe Zevos – creation

== Release history ==
Region	Date	Label	Format
United States	November 2, 2010	MMI, Zone 4, Music Line Group, Interscope Records	CD
