= Edwin Decena =

- Born: Passaic, New Jersey, U.S.
- Education: Rutgers University
- Occupations: Film director, editor, music video director
- Years active: 2005–present

Edwin Decena is an American music video and independent film director.

Edwin first contribution as a filmmaker came directing and editing the reggaeton documentary "Chosen Few: El Documental."

== Early life and education ==
Decena was born in Passaic, New Jersey and is of Dominican descent. He graduated from Passaic High School and studied sociology at Rutgers-Newark. While at Rutgers, he hosted a college radio show where he interviewed several independent hip hop artist that he would eventually direct music video for.

== Career ==
=== Music Videos ===
Decena has created a number of music videos for many artists, including Plies featuring T-Pain ("Shawty"), Cupid ("Cupid Shuffle"), Lil Boosie featuring Jeezy ("Better Believe It"), Jaheim ("Never"), Webbie ("I Miss You"), Rich Boy ("Let's Get This Paper"), Saigon featuring Swizz Beatz and Just Blaze ("C'mon Baby"), DG Yola ("Ain't Gon Let Up"), Troy Ave ("Rep It Wit My Heart"), Governor ("Blood Sweat and Tears"), Anthony Hamilton featuring Musiq Soulchild and Jaheim ("Struggle No More"), Red Cafe featuring Fabolous and Diddy ("Money, Money, Money"), Maino featuring Swizz Beaz ("Million Bucks"), and Slim featuring Yung Joc and Shawty Lo ("So Fly").

=== Short and Feature Films ===
In 2006, he co-directed the feature film, Transformations with his childhood friend Javier Molina. The film went on the win an Odyssey Award for best feature film at the 5th Annual H2O International Film Festival. In 2011, Edwin directed 2 part short film series entitled Hunting Shadows starring Rob Morgan, Darlenis Duran, Goya Robles and Tanaya Henry.

== Style ==
Throughout the majority videos in which he collaborated with cinematographer Kitao Sakurai, Decena employed the use of handheld camera which enhanced the immediacy of the visual experience. As a response to declining production budgets, Decena's work focused on realism, cinematic aesthetic, and an attempt honest characterizations of his subjects as opposed to hype realistic and flashy imagery.

== Filmography ==
Year	Title	Type	Role
2004	"Chosen Few: El Documental"	Documentary	Chief Editor
2006	"Transformations"	Feature Film	Director
2006	"Chosen Few II: El Documental"	Documentary	Director
2010	"Aardvark"	Feature Film	Assistant Director
2011	"Hunting Shadows"	Short	Director
2012	Murdaland Prince	Short	Director

== See also ==
- List of Dominican Americans (Dominican Republic)
