= K.E. on the Track =

American record producer

- Also known as: K.E.
- Born: Kevin Erondu; Tampa, Florida, U.S.
- Origin: Valdosta, Georgia, U.S.
- Genre: Hip hop
- Occupation: Record producer
- Years active: 2008–present
- Label: Beat Mechanics Entertainment LLC

Kevin Erondu, better known as K.E. on the Track, is an American record producer.

== Early life ==
Kevin Erondu was born in Tampa, Florida. He originated in Valdosta, Georgia.

== Career ==
K.E.'s breakthrough came in 2009, when he produced the single "Swag Surfin" by rap group Fast Life Yungstaz. The song received airplay and charted at No. 62 on the Billboard Hot 100.

In 2010, he worked on rapper Roscoe Dash's debut album Ready Set Go!, where he produced 5 of the 9 songs, including both singles. "All the Way Turnt Up" was released in January 2010 and peaked at No. 46 on the Billboard Hot 100. It spawned multiple remixes by artists such as Ludacris, Fabolous and MGK. K.E. also co-wrote and produced the second single "Show Out", released in August the same year.

In 2011, he produced the song "You the Boss" by Rick Ross and Nicki Minaj, which was originally released as the first single from Ross' fifth studio album God Forgives, I Don't. Eventually the track was taken off the final track list, even though it peaked at No. 62 on the Billboard Hot 100. It was also placed at number 33 and number 37, respectively, on the Billboard Year-end charts for Hot Rap Songs and Hot R&B/Hip-Hop Songs.

In 2012, K.E. worked with Future on his debut album Pluto. K.E. produced the song "Magic," which appeared on Future's 2011 mixtape True Story and its remix with rapper T.I., which was featured on the album. "Magic" was released as the second single from Pluto in January 2012 and peaked at No. 69 on the Billboard Hot 100. Later in 2012, K.E. produced the track "I'm So Blessed" (featuring Big Sean, Wiz Khalifa, Ace Hood and T-Pain) from DJ Khaled's sixth studio album Kiss the Ring. After Khaled heard K.E.'s production on "You the Boss," he contacted him to get some beats and created the song, which made the cut for the album.

As a lead artist and record producer, K.E. has released a number of instrumental mixtapes in the Hip hop, trap and EDM genres, such as The Art of Trap, EDM Nation 1 & 2 and the Best Beats in the World series.

In November 2012, K.E. stated he was working on Future's second album, as well as tracks with, Young Jeezy, Eminem, French Montana and Kirko Bangz. In December 2013, the lead single from Rick Ross' Mastermind "The Devil Is A Lie" was released, crediting K.E. as the song's producer. In Jan. 2014 K.E. released singles with artists including Kevin Gates, Shy Glizzy, and Tracy-T. He also produced Mila J's lead single, entitled ' Pain In My Heart. In December 2014, K.E. produced three singles on rapper Shy Glizzy's mixtape "LAW 3"

In January 2015, K.E. created Beat Mechanics Entertainment to sign artists and producers.

He has a Grammy Award nomination for co-producing Tamar Braxton’s Love and War album in 2014.

== Discography ==
- 2010: Best Beats in the World
- 2011: Best Beats in the World 2
- 2012: Best Beats in the World 3
- 2012: Best Beats in the World 4
- 2012: EDM Nation
- 2013: EDM Nation 2
- 2013: The Art of Trap

== Production discography ==
=== Charted Singles ===
Year	Title	Chart positions				Certifications	Album
Year	Title	US	US R&B	US Rap	US Chr.	Certifications	Album
2009	"Swag Surfin" (Fast Life Yungstaz)	62	12	7	—		Jamboree
2010	"All the Way Turnt Up" (Roscoe Dash feat. Soulja Boy)	46	18	8	—		Ready Set Go!
2010	"Show Out" (Roscoe Dash)	—	41	22	—		Ready Set Go!
2010	"Girlfriend" (Nicki Minaj)	—	113	—	—		non-album single
2011	"You the Boss" (Rick Ross feat. Nicki Minaj)	62	5	10	—		non-album single
2011	"Let It Fly" (Maino feat. Roscoe Dash)	6	57	57	—		The Day After Tomorrow
2012	"Magic" (Future feat. T.I.)	69	10	13	—		Pluto
2013	"Round of Applause" (Lecrae)	—	—	—	45		Church Clothes 2
2013	"I'm Turnt" (Lecrae)	—	—	—	31		Church Clothes 2
2014	"The Devil Is a Lie" (Rick Ross feat. Jay-Z)	86	26	16	—		Mastermind
2016	"Jimmy Choo" (Fetty Wap)	65	23	10	—		

=== Other songs ===
==== 2009 ====
Fast Life Yungstaz – Jamboree

- 02 – Bands
- 03 – Swag Surfin
- 04 – Party Time
- 05 – Mr. Lenox
- 09 – Prada Walkin

Lil Wayne – No Ceilings

- 01 – Swag Surf

==== 2010 ====
J.Reu – The Huggz -N- Kissez Mixtape

- 08 – I Ain't Even Famous
- 15 – All the Way Turned Out

Roscoe Dash – Ready Set Go!

- 01 – Ready Set Go
- 02 – All the Way Turnt Up
- 03 – Show Out
- 08 – I Be Shopping
- 09 – All I Know

Nicki Minaj – non-album single

- 01 – Girlfriend

Ace Hood – The Statement

- 05 – Why You Mad
- Ball Out – non-album single
- Wind It – non-album single

==== 2012 ====
Maino – The Day After Tomorrow

- 9 – Let It Fly

Chris Brown – Future: The Prequel

- 3 – Gettin' Money

Chris Brown – non-album single

- Bitch I'm Paid

Future – Astronaut Status

- 21 – No Matter What

Gucci Mane – Trap Back

- 17 – Club Hoppin

Cash Out – It's My Time

- 15 – No Red Light

Future– Pluto

- 05 – Magic (Remix)

Travis Porter – From Day 1

- 09 – Party Time

Rick Ross – God Forgives, I Don't

- 00 – You the Boss

DJ Khaled – Kiss the Ring

- 06 – I'm So Blessed

Bobby V – Dusk Till Dawn

- 03 – Mirror

Chief Keef – Finally Rich

- 06 – Kay Kay

2 Chainz ft. Waka Flocka

- Ball – non-album single

==== 2013 ====
Young Thug – 1017 Thug

- 17 – Tabernacle

Future & Freeband Gang – Black Woodstock: The Soundtrack

- 07 – Blow Them Bands

Robb Bank$ – Tha City

- Trust Me

SD – Life of a Savage 3

- 04 – Gotta Get It

==== 2021 ====
Tommy MV$ERVTI – Tommy MV$ERVTI vs. K.E. On The Track

- 01 - I Get That
- 02 - 5Ever
- 03 - Meson Rey
