= J.U.I.C.E. (EP) =

EP by Roscoe Dash
- Released: December 20, 2011
- Recorded: 2009–11
- Genre: Hip hop, R&B, crunk
- Length: 27:41
- Label: Music Line; Geffen
- Producer: Kane Beatz, Super Dave, Squat Beatz, Isaac Hayes III, Drew da Beast, Nard & B, Sonny Digital

Roscoe Dash chronology
Ready Set Go! (2010)	J.U.I.C.E. (2011)	Dash Effect 2 (2015)

Singles from J.U.I.C.E.
- 1. "Good Good Night" Released: October 4, 2011; 2. "Into The Morning" Released: March 12, 2012

J.U.I.C.E. (abbreviation for Just Understand I Control Everything) is the debut extended play (EP) by American hip hop recording artist Roscoe Dash. It was released on December 20, 2011, by Music Line Group and Geffen Records.

The EP debuted at number 180 on the Billboard 200, with first-week sales of 9,500 copies in the United States. In its second week, the EP peaked at number 130.

== Singles ==
The EP's lead single, "Good Good Night", was produced by Kane Beatz and narrowly entered the Billboard Hot 100. The song was released to the iTunes Store on October 4, 2011.

== Track listing ==
No.	Title	Writer(s)	Producer(s)	Length
1.	"I Do" (featuring K'LA)	Jeffrey Johnson, Britanie Buggs, Julius Rivera III, Torrey Hood, P. Davis	Squat Beats, Jordan J. Sirhan, Isaac "Ike Dirty" Hayes III	4:46
2.	"The Impossible"	Johnson, Roger Greene, Jr.	Mista Raja	4:24
3.	"Good Good Night"	Johnson, Tony Scales, Daniel Johnson, Jeremy Coleman, Torrey Hood, L. Sylvers	Kane Beatz	3:25
4.	"Sidity" (featuring Big Sean)	Johnson, Andrew Knott, David Knott, Hood, Sean Anderson	Super Dave, Drew da Beast	4:44
5.	"Into the Morning" (featuring Wale)	Johnson, James Rosser, Jr., Brandon Rackley, Olubowale Akintimehin	Nard & B	3:48
6.	"Very First Time"	Johnson, Sonny Corey Uwaezuoke, Torrey Hood, W. Goodman, W. Morris, H. Ray	Sonny Digital	3:23
7.	"Awesome"	Johnson, Sonny Corey Uwaezuoke	Sonny Digital	3:09
Total length:				27:41

== Charts ==
Chart (2012)	Peak position
US Billboard 200	133
US Heatseekers Albums (Billboard)	1
US Top R&B/Hip-Hop Albums (Billboard)	28
