= The Day After Tomorrow (Maino album) =

Studio album by Maino
- Released: February 28, 2012
- Recorded: 2009–2011
- Genre: Hip hop
- Length: 59:55
- Label: Hustle Hard, E1, Atlantic
- Producer: Maino (exec.), K.E. on the Track, Blast Off Productions, Buckwild, Coalition Forces, Mando Beats, Gorilla Tek, A-Squared, Sean St. Cyr, Dangerous LLC, The Arcade, The Colleagues, GQ Beats, Clinton Sparks

Maino chronology
If Tomorrow Comes... (2009)	The Day After Tomorrow (2012)

Singles from The Day After Tomorrow
- 1. "Let It Fly" Released: June 14, 2011; 2. "That Could Be Us" Released: October 18, 2011

Professional ratings
Review scores
Source	Rating
AllMusic	3/5 stars
HipHopDX	3/5 stars
RapReviews	(7/10)

The Day After Tomorrow is the second studio album by American hip hop rapper and recording artist Maino. The album was released on February 28, 2012 via Atlantic Records and E1 Music. The album features guest appearances from T.I., Meek Mill, Roscoe Dash and Lloyd Banks, among others.

== Background ==
The album was originally scheduled to be released on October 4, 2011 but it got pushed back to February 28, 2012. In preparation for the album's release, Maino released a promotional mixtape titled I Am Who I Am, on January 26, 2012. The mixtape included the remix to "Let It Fly" and "Cream" featuring T.I. and Meek Mill.

== Singles ==
"Let It Fly" was released as the album's lead single on June 14, 2011. The song features Roscoe Dash, and the music video, directed by Michael Dispenza, premiered on August 1, 2011. The second single from the album, "That Could Be Us" featuring Robbie Nova, was released on October 18, 2011. The album's third single was "The Day After Tomorrow" and was released to U.S. urban radio on March 6, 2012.

== Commercial performance ==
The album debuted at number 94 on the Billboard 200 with first-week sales of 6,300 copies in the United States. In its second week, the album sold another 2,200 copies total at 8,500.

== Track listing ==
No.	Title	Producer(s)	Length
1.	"Intro"		0:58
2.	"Never Gon' Stop"	Blast Off Productions	4:12
3.	"Make That Money"	Blast Off Productions	2:48
4.	"Nino Brown"	Buckwild	4:21
5.	"Need a Way Out" (featuring Mista Raja)	Coalition Forces, Mando Beats	4:30
6.	"Unstoppable"	Gorilla Tek	4:39
7.	"Gangstas Ain't Dead" (featuring PUSH! Montana and Mouse)	A-Squared	4:18
8.	"Cream" (featuring T.I. and Meek Mill)	Coalition Forces	4:02
9.	"Let It Fly" (featuring Roscoe Dash)	K.E., Shawn St. Cyr	3:46
10.	"That Could Be Us" (featuring Robbie Nova)	Dangerous LLC	4:18
11.	"A Dream (Interlude)"		1:18
12.	"Heart Stop"	The Arcade	4:36
13.	"Heaven for a G"	Blast Off Productions	4:23
14.	"Messiah"	The Colleagues	4:23
15.	"Glad to Be Alive"	GQ Beats	3:32
16.	"Day After Tomorrow"	Blast Off Productions	3:56

Best Buy exclusive bonus tracks
No.	Title	Producer(s)	Length
17.	"Yes, Yes Y'all" (featuring Lloyd Banks)	GQ Beats	4:13
18.	"Criminal"	GQ Beats	4:18
19.	"Rare Breed"	Clinton Sparks	3:04

== Charts ==
Chart (2012)	Peak position
US Billboard 200	94
US Top R&B/Hip-Hop Albums (Billboard)	17
