= Let It Fly (song) =

Single by Maino featuring Roscoe Dash

from the album The Day After Tomorrow
- Released: June 21, 2011
- Recorded: 2011
- Genre: Hip hop
- Length: 3:46
- Label: Atlantic; E1 Music
- Songwriters: Jermaine Coleman; Jeffery Johnson, Jr.; Dallas Diamond; Kevin Erondu
- Producers: PayAttention; Garner Bros

Maino singles chronology
"Million Bucks" (2009)	"Let It Fly" (2011)	"That Could Be Us" (2011)

Roscoe Dash singles chronology
"Oh My" (2011)	"Let It Fly" (2011)	"Marvin & Chardonnay" (2011)

Music video
- "Let It Fly" on YouTube

"Let It Fly" is a song by American hip hop recording artist Maino, released on June 21, 2011, that serves as the lead single from his second studio album The Day After Tomorrow. The song features fellow American recording artist Roscoe Dash and was produced by K.E. and Shawn St. Cyr.

== Remix ==
The official remix, released on September 12, 2011, features Roscoe Dash, DJ Khaled, Ace Hood, Meek Mill, Jim Jones & Wale. Maino included the remix on his 2012 mixtape I Am Who I Am.

== Music video ==
On July 7, 2011, behind-the-scenes was released the footage of the music video . The music video, directed by Michael Dispenza, was filmed in Long Island and was released on August 3, 2011. The video features cameo appearances from Reek da Villian, Fred the Godson and Uncle Murda.

== Charts ==
Chart (2011)	Peak position
US Bubbling Under Hot 100 Singles (Billboard)	6
US Billboard Hot R&B/Hip-Hop Songs	57

== Release Information ==
=== Purchasable Release ===
Country	Date	Format	Label	Ref
United States	June 21, 2011	Digital download	Atlantic	
