= Candy Green =

Song by Swizz Beatz

from the album Sound of Color
- Released: 2008
- Recorded: 2008
- Genre: Hip hop
- Length: 3:31
- Label: Full Surface
- Songwriter: Swizz Beatz
- Producer: The Individualz

"Candy Green" is a song by Swizz Beatz for Gap, Inc.'s Sound of Color campaign. It was produced by Full Surface in-house production team The Individualz.

== Background ==
Developed by Gap Clothing and Rehab (a San Francisco-based production company), five artists across multiple genres were asked to record original material that represented the Sound of Color. Asked to write and perform a treatment for the color green, Swizz Beatz partnered with producers The Individuals, and together they created a song about driving in a drop top through the flashy streets of Miami, Florida. Swizz also stated in an interview "I didn't want to do a song I wasn't comfortable giving to the DJs," Swizz tells Billboard. "I took the approach of, 'How would I use green in a painting without making green the main ingredient, and use it in the slickest way?'"

== Music video ==
Tom Gatsoulis directed the music video. The video has everything from fast cars, plot twists, and clowns. The music video can be watched on YouTube or at the official Sound of Color Website.
