= Million Bucks =

Single by Maino featuring Swizz Beatz

from the album If Tomorrow Comes...
- Released: July 3, 2009
- Recorded: 2009; Integrated Studios (New York, New York); Grind House Studios (New York, New York)
- Genre: Hip hop
- Length: 2:57 (album version)
- Label: Hustle Hard, Atlantic
- Songwriters: J. Coleman, K. Dean, A. Chambliss, J. Gonzalez
- Producer: Swizz Beatz

Maino singles chronology
"All the Above" (2009)	"Million Bucks" (2009)	"Let It Fly" (2011)

Swizz Beatz singles chronology
"Who's Real" (2009)	"Million Bucks" (2009)	"I Do" (2009)

"Million Bucks" is a song by American hip hop recording artist Maino, taken from his debut studio album, If Tomorrow Comes.... The song, released July 3, 2009, serves as the third single and features vocals and production from Swizz Beatz.

== Background ==
When asked about the record Maino said:

It was crazy, When Swizz first played it for me I said, 'Come on Swizz, I don't got a million dollars man.' He said, 'Nah, but I got a million dollars.' And we laughed. I found a way to be me without trying to look like I was more rich than what I was portraying. I didn't want to come off like I'm more richer than what I really am. It's a song about trying to spread love in the hood and giving back so I made it more or less like that.

== Music video ==
A music video was shot in Brooklyn, New York with director Edwin Decena. Rappers Red Cafe, Kayto, Lil Mama, Uncle Murda & Grafh made cameo appearances. A Behind the scenes preview was released on June 15, 2009. The video was released July 9 on Maino's Twitter account.

== Chart positions ==
Chart (2009)	Peak Position
US Hot R&B/Hip-Hop Songs (Billboard)	66
US Hot Rap Songs (Billboard)	21
