= If Tomorrow Comes... =

Studio album by Maino
- Released: June 30, 2009
- Recorded: 2008–2009
- Genre: Hip hop
- Length: 65:05
- Label: Hustle Hard, Atlantic
- Producer: Maino (exec.), Swizz Beatz, G.Q. Beats, Prettyboy, Bradd Young, Da Beatstaz, BG Beatz, Blast Off, Just Blaze, Nard & B, J.U.S.T.I.C.E. League, Coalition Forces, Versatile, Delemma, Lenwood Reed, Chris Styles, Charlemagne, Steven Kang Cruz, Brian Berger

Maino chronology
| If Tomorrow Comes... (2009) | The Day After Tomorrow (2012) |

Singles from If Tomorrow Comes...
- 1. "Hi Hater" Released: April 29, 2008; 2. "All the Above" Released: February 17, 2009; 3. "Million Bucks" Released: May 19, 2009

Professional ratings
Review scores
| Source | Rating |
|---|---|
| AllMusic | 4/5 stars |
| DJBooth | 3.5/5 stars |
| HipHopDX | 3/5 stars |
| RapReviews | (7.5/10) |
| USA Today | 3/4 stars |
| XXL | 3/5 stars |

If Tomorrow Comes... is the debut studio album by American rapper Maino. It was released on June 30, 2009, by his independent record label Hustle Hard, distributed by Atlantic Records. The album was supported by three singles: "Hi Hater", "All the Above" featuring T-Pain, and "Million Bucks" featuring Swizz Beatz.

== Background ==
In 2003, Maino was released from prison after a 10-year sentence for a drug related kidnapping. He became a founder of his own independent record label, called Hustle Hard. In 2005, it was announced that he had signed a deal to Universal Records, and been started recording his major-label debut album under the title called Death Before Dishonor. However, Maino was dropped from the label and his album was shelved. In 2007, Atlantic Records signed him and took in the aegis of his Hustle Hard imprint.

== Singles ==
The official debut single from the album, called "Hi Hater" was released on April 29, 2008. The song peaked at number 16 on the US Billboard's Hot Rap Tracks, and number 26 on the Hot R&B/Hip-Hop Songs.

The second single from the album, called "All the Above" was released on February 17, 2009. The track features guest vocals from an American recording artist T-Pain. The song became the most successful single peaking at number 39 on the US Billboard Hot 100.

The third single from the album, called "Million Bucks" was released on May 19, 2009. The track features guest vocals from Swizz Beatz.

== Commercial performance ==
The album debuted at number 25 on the Billboard 200, with first-week sales of 18,000 copies in the United States.

== Track listing ==
| No. | Title | Writer(s) | Producer(s) | Length |
|---|---|---|---|---|
| 1. | "Million Bucks" (featuring Swizz Beatz) | J. Coleman, K. Dean, A. Chambliss, J. Gonzalez | Swizz Beatz | 2:57 |
| 2. | "Scene 1: If Tomorrow Comes... (skit)" | | | 1:20 |
| 3. | "Back to Life" (featuring Push! Montana) | J. Coleman, W. Brown, Jr., R. White | G.Q. Beats | 3:15 |
| 4. | "Remember My Name" | J. Coleman, O. Watson, B, Ray, M. Wilson, D. Howard | Prettyboy, Bradd Young, Da Beatstaz, BG Beatz | 3:46 |
| 5. | "Gangsta" (featuring B.G.) | J. Coleman, M. Caliste, C. Dorsey, J. Watson | Blast Off | 4:35 |
| 6. | "Scene 2: The Meeting (skit)" | | | 0:40 |
| 7. | "All the Above" (featuring T-Pain) | J. Coleman, J. Smith, B. Rosser, B. Rackley, F. Najm | Just Blaze, Nard & B | 5:15 |
| 8. | "Here Comes Trouble" | E. Ortiz, K. Crowe, J. Coleman | J.U.S.T.I.C.E. League | 3:14 |
| 9. | "Scene 3: Hating (skit)" | | | 1:10 |
| 10. | "Hi Hater" | J. Coleman, R. Greene, R. Simmons, J. Spicer | Coalition Forces | 3:38 |
| 11. | "Let's Make a Movie (additional vocals by Eritza Laues)" | J. Coleman, R. Greene, D. Smith, Y. Alexander | Coalition Forces | 4:03 |
| 12. | "Kill You" | J. Coleman, W. Brown, Jr. | G.Q. Beats | 3:06 |
| 13. | "Scene 4: Contemplating (skit)" | | | 0:48 |
| 14. | "Runaway Slave" | J. Coleman, A. Roettger, D. Thomas | Versatile, Dilemma | 3:58 |
| 15. | "Soldier" | J. Coleman, L. Reed | Lenwood Reed | 4:12 |
| 16. | "Hood Love" (featuring Trey Songz) | J. Coleman, T. Crawford, J. Marcus, R. Greene | Chris Styles, Marcus D'Tray | 4:12 |
| 17. | "Floating" | J. Coleman, H. Charlemagne, S. Kang, C. Franke, E. Froese, J. Schmoelling | Charlemagne, Steven Kang Cruz | 3:27 |
| 18. | "Scene 5: The Phone Call" | | | 0:45 |
| 19. | "Celebrate" | J. Coleman, B. Berger, A. Roettger | Versatile, Brian Berger, Jermaine Coleman | 10:54 |

== Personnel ==
- Executive producer - Jermaine "Maino" Coleman
- Associate executive producer - Jean Nelson
- A&R director - Brian Berger
- A&R administration - Lanre Gaba
- Marketing direction - Marsha St. Hubert
- Stylist - Groovy Lew
- Publicity - Sydney Margetson
- Art direction & design - Nick "Malvone" Bilardello
- Photographer - Micheal Schreiber
- Packaging production - Brian Ranney
- Art management & production - Rob Gold
- Management - Karl Lawrence
- Bookings - Alisa Lawrence
- Legal - Scott Felcher
- Street Team - Keith "Youngin" George II
- Mastered by Chris Gehringer

== Charts ==
| Chart (2009) | Peak position |
|---|---|
| US Billboard 200 | 25 |
| US Top R&B/Hip-Hop Albums (Billboard) | 4 |
