= All the Above (Maino song) =

Single by Maino featuring T-Pain

from the album If Tomorrow Comes...
- B-side: "Hood Love"
- Released: February 17, 2009
- Recorded: 2009
- Genre: Hip hop
- Length: 5:19 (Album Version); 3:56 (Radio Edit)
- Label: Atlantic
- Songwriters: Jermaine Coleman, Faheem Najm, Justin Smith
- Producers: Just Blaze, Nard & B (co)

Maino singles chronology
"Hi Hater" (2008)	"All the Above" (2009)	"Million Bucks" (2009)

T-Pain singles chronology
"Feel It" (2009)	"All the Above" (2009)	"Download" (2009)

"All the Above" is a song by American rapper Maino, released on February 17, 2009, as the second single from his debut album If Tomorrow Comes... (2009). The song, which features vocals from fellow American singer T-Pain, was produced by Just Blaze and co-produced by Nard & B. The song is noted to have similar elements, such as the lead synthesizers, drum pattern, and violins but in a different key and different chords, as T.I.'s hit single "Live Your Life", also produced by Just Blaze.

"All the Above" peaked at number 39 on the Billboard Hot 100, making this his only Top 40 hit on that chart to date. It also peaked at numbers 10, 24 and 59, on the Hot Rap Songs, Digital Songs and Hot R&B/Hip-Hop Songs charts, respectively. A music video directed by Erik White was made to promote the single.

== Chart performance ==
"All the Above" is Maino's first single to chart on the Billboard Hot 100. It debuted at number 54 and then rose to number 39 the next week, before falling out of the top fifty a couple weeks later, and then climbed back into the top fifty for another five weeks without surpassing the original peak position. It also peaked at number 10 on the Hot Rap Songs chart, number 24 on the Digital Songs chart and number 59 on the Hot R&B/Hip-Hop Songs chart. The single was certified platinum and is Maino's only Top 40 hit to date.

== Music video ==
The music video, which was directed by Erik White, was shot in Miami and features Maino drinking "Purple Stuff", a relaxation drink from Funktional Beverages, during an interview sequence. The music video premiered on MTV Jams on March 23, 2009.

It ranked at number 61 on BET's Notarized: Top 100 Videos of 2009 countdown.

== Remix ==
The official remix features a verse by rapper Young Jeezy, T-Pain still on the chorus, and a new verse by Maino.

== In popular culture ==
- In the 2009 NCAA Division I FBS football season, the Auburn Tigers football team used it as a pre-game song and it has now become part of their regularly played music during the games.
- This song was used as the entrance song for Danillo Villefort at UFC 101.
- It is also used as the entrance song for the 2009–2012 Virginia Tech Hokies men's basketball teams and the theme song of the Saskatoon Accelerators
- During the 2009–10 NCAA baseball season, very many ACC teams, most prominently the Florida State Seminoles, the Miami Hurricanes, the Georgia Tech Yellow Jackets, the Virginia Cavaliers, and the Virginia Tech Hokies, used the chorus and T-Pain's line, (from the extended version), as a walk-up song. It was also used prevalently at that year's ACC baseball tournament, in Greensboro, North Carolina.
- Ryan Hanigan of the Cincinnati Reds, Dan Uggla of the Atlanta Braves and Robert Andino of the Baltimore Orioles use it as their walk-up song.
- The Charlotte Bobcats use it as their pre-tip-off song.
- The West Virginia Mountaineers men's basketball team used the song in their pre-game entrance video for the 2009–2010 season.
- The 2011 Oregon Ducks football team used a parody by the a cappella group On the Rocks entitled "Call Me A Duck". The video has become a popular hit with the University of Oregon population.
- The Montreal Canadiens used the song in a pregame video tribute to P.K. Subban in his first return in Montreal on March 2, 2017.

== Track listing ==
Digital download

1. "All the Above" (feat. T-Pain) – 5:19

== Charts and certifications ==
=== Weekly charts ===
Chart (2009)	Peak position
US Billboard Hot 100	39
US Hot R&B/Hip-Hop Songs (Billboard)	59
US Hot Rap Songs (Billboard)	10

=== Certifications ===
Region	Certification	Certified units/sales
United States (RIAA)	Platinum	1,000,000^{^}
^{^} Shipments figures based on certification alone.

=== Year-end charts ===
Chart (2009)	Position
US Digital Songs (Billboard)	73
US Hot Rap Songs (Billboard)	38
