= Finally Famous (Big Sean album) =

Studio album by Big Sean
- Released: June 28, 2011
- Recorded: 2010–2011
- Studios: Paramount Recording Studio, 4220 Studios (Hollywood, California); The Loft (Detroit, Michigan); Boogie Down Chinatown Studios (Philadelphia, Pennsylvania); CRC Studio (Chicago, Illinois); Legend Studios, Manhattan Sound Recording Studios, The Mercer, The Record Plant Studios (New York, New York); Westlake Studios (West Hollywood, California)
- Genre: Hip-hop
- Length: 50:40
- Labels: GOOD; Def Jam
- Producers: Boi-1da; Da Internz; Exile; Filthy Rockwell; Kevin Randolph; Key Wane; The Legendary Traxster; Mike Dean; The Neptunes; No I.D.; Pop Wansel; WrighTrax; Xaphoon Jones

Big Sean chronology
| Finally Famous Vol. 3: Big (2010) | Finally Famous (2011) | Detroit (2012) |

Singles from Finally Famous
- 1. "My Last" Released: March 3, 2011; 2. "Marvin & Chardonnay" Released: July 14, 2011; 3. "Dance (Ass)" Released: September 22, 2011

Finally Famous is the debut studio album by American rapper Big Sean. It was released on June 28, 2011, by GOOD Music and Def Jam Recordings. Recording sessions took place from 2010 to 2011, with Kanye West serving as the only executive producer on the album. The record serves as Big Sean's first studio release, under the whole Finally Famous series, following these mixtapes such as Finally Famous Vol. 1: The Mixtape (2007), Finally Famous Vol. 2: UKNOWBIGSEAN (2009) and Finally Famous Vol. 3: Big (2010).

The album was supported by three singles: "My Last" featuring Chris Brown, "Marvin & Chardonnay" featuring West and Roscoe Dash, and "Dance (Ass)". The album received generally positive reviews from critics. The album debuted at number three on the US Billboard 200, selling 87,000 copies in its first week.

== Singles ==
The commercial debut single, titled "My Last", was released on March 1, 2011. The song features guest vocals from American recording artist Chris Brown, while the production was handled by No I.D. The song debuted at number 30 on the US Billboard Hot 100. The song also topped the Billboard's Top Rap Songs, becoming his first number-one hit on the chart in the United States.

"Marvin & Chardonnay" featuring Kanye West and Roscoe Dash, was sent to radio on July 12, 2011, as the album's second single. The song was produced by Pop Wansel. The song peaked at number 32 on the US Billboard Hot 100.

"Dance (Ass)" was sent to urban radio as the album's third single on September 20, 2011. The song was produced by Da Internz. The remix to "Dance (Ass)", featuring Nicki Minaj, was sent to urban radio on October 18, 2011.

=== Promotional singles ===
The album's first promotional single, "I Do It", was released via digital download on May 10, 2011. No I.D. also produced the track, alongside The Legendary Traxster. The song peaked at number 92 on the US Billboard's Top R&B/Hip-Hop chart.

The album's second promotional single, "What Goes Around", was released on May 20, 2011. No I.D. also produced the track. The song failed to chart.

The album's third promotional single, "So Much More", was released on June 14, 2011. No I.D. also produced the track.

== Critical response ==
Professional ratings
Aggregate scores
| Source | Rating |
|---|---|
| Metacritic | 69/100 |
Review scores
| Source | Rating |
| AllMusic | 4/5 stars |
| The A.V. Club | (C) |
| Consequence of Sound | 3/5 stars |
| HipHopDX | 4/5 stars |
| The New York Times | (favorable) |
| Now | 2/5 stars |
| Pitchfork | (6.1/10.0) |
| RapReviews | (6.5/10) |
| Rolling Stone | 3.5/5 stars |
| XXL | (XL) |

Finally Famous was met with generally favorable reviews from music critics. At Metacritic, which assigns a normalized rating out of 100 to reviews from mainstream critics, the album received an average score of 69, based on 20 reviews, which indicates "generally favorable reviews". AllMusic's David Jeffries gave the album four out of five stars, saying "Fun, inventive, swaggering, and smart, Finally Famous is an exciting debut." William E. Ketchum III of HipHopDX gave the album four out of five stars, saying "The final product is a solid debut that shows enough of Sean's skill and personality to keep listeners stay tuned, with the room for growth for higher expectations next time around."

Chris Martins of The A.V. Club gave the album a C, saying "Complexity is a hallmark of any good artist, but Sean seems distracted by clichéd ideas of identity." Kevin Ritchie of Now gave the album two out of five stars, saying "Kanye West protégé and "hashtag rap" inventor Big Sean basks in the glow of Chicago producer No I.D.’s uplifting, soul-inflected beats on his debut album, an enjoyable enough summertime record that showcases the Detroit MC’s ability to trade punchlines with pop choruses." Sam Hockley-Smith of Pitchfork gave the album a 6.1 out of 10, saying "We can only hope that for album two, Sean will step out from the herculean shadows of the artists he surrounds himself with and learn the art of subtlety."

Matthew Trammell of Rolling Stone gave the album three and a half stars out of five, saying "Finally Famous is a choice summertime rap record, complete with bright, breezy synth beats and cameos from Chris Brown and Mr. West himself." Jesal Padania of RapReviews gave the album a 6.5 out of 10, saying "On an eleven track album, the production values are high, the choruses are generally pretty great, and it is without a doubt one of the more enjoyable records to bump in 2011."

== Commercial performance ==
Finally Famous debuted at number three on the US Billboard 200, selling 87,000 copies in its first week of release. This became Sean's first US top-ten debut. In its second week, the album dropped to number nine on the chart, selling an additional 27,000 copies. On October 25, 2017, the album was certified platinum by the Recording Industry Association of America (RIAA) for sales of over a million copies in the United States.

== Track listing ==
Finally Famous — Standard edition
| No. | Title | Writer(s) | Producer(s) | Length |
|---|---|---|---|---|
| 1. | "Intro" | Sean Anderson; Kevin Randolph; Dwane Weir II | Randolph; Key Wane | 1:14 |
| 2. | "I Do It" | Anderson; Dion Wilson; Samuel Lindley | No I.D.; The Legendary Traxster | 3:35 |
| 3. | "My Last" (featuring Chris Brown) | Anderson; Christopher Brown; Wilson; James Harris III; Terry Lewis | No I.D. | 4:14 |
| 4. | "Don't Tell Me You Love Me" | Anderson; Wilson; Michael Posner | No I.D. | 3:56 |
| 5. | "Wait for Me" (featuring Lupe Fiasco) | Anderson; Wasalu Jaco; Wilson; Aleksander Manfredi | No I.D.; Exile | 3:57 |
| 6. | "Marvin & Chardonnay" (featuring Kanye West and Roscoe Dash) | Anderson; Kanye West; Jeffery Johnson; Andrew "Pop" Wansel | Pop Wansel; Mike Dean (add.) | 3:42 |
| 7. | "Dance (Ass)" | Anderson; Marcos Palacios; Ernest Clark | Da Internz | 3:17 |
| 8. | "Get It (DT)" | Anderson; Pharrell Williams; Chad Hugo | The Neptunes | 3:27 |
| 9. | "Memories (Part II)" (featuring John Legend) | Anderson; John Stephens; Wilson | No I.D. | 4:35 |
| 10. | "High" (featuring Wiz Khalifa and Chiddy Bang) | Anderson; Cameron Thomaz; Chidera Anamege; Noah Beresin | Xaphoon Jones | 4:20 |
| 11. | "Live This Life" (featuring The-Dream) | Anderson; Terius Nash; Wilson | No I.D. | 4:18 |
| 12. | "So Much More" | Anderson; Wilson | No I.D. | 5:55 |
| Total length: | | | | 50:40 |

Finally Famous — Deluxe edition (bonus tracks)
| No. | Title | Writer(s) | Producer(s) | Length |
|---|---|---|---|---|
| 13. | "What Goes Around" | Anderson; Wilson | No I.D. | 4:19 |
| 14. | "Celebrity" (featuring Dwele) | Anderson; Andwele Gardner; Wilson | Filthy Rockwell; No I.D. (co.) | 3:44 |
| 15. | "My House" | Anderson; Matthew Samuels | Boi-1da; Arthur McArthur (add.) | 3:33 |
| 16. | "100 Keys" (featuring Rick Ross and Pusha T) | Anderson; William Roberts II; Terrence Thornton; Brian Wright | WrighTrax | 3:49 |
| Total length: | | | | 65:35 |

Finally Famous — iTunes version (bonus track)
| No. | Title | Writer(s) | Producer(s) | Length |
|---|---|---|---|---|
| 17. | "Dance (Ass) (Remix)" (featuring Nicki Minaj) | Anderson; Onika Maraj; Palacios; Clark | Da Internz | 3:40 |
| Total length: | | | | 54:20 |

Finally Famous — iTunes deluxe edition (bonus videos)
| No. | Title | Length |
|---|---|---|
| 18. | "My Last" (featuring Chris Brown) | 5:15 |
| 19. | "I Do It" | 3:35 |
| 20. | "Marvin & Chardonnay" (featuring Kanye West and Roscoe Dash) | 3:34 |
| 21. | "Dance (Ass) (Remix)" (Revised) (featuring Nicki Minaj) | 3:53 |

Finally Famous — 10th anniversary
| No. | Title | Writer(s) | Producer(s) | Length |
|---|---|---|---|---|
| 7. | "Dance (Ass) (Remix)" (featuring Nicki Minaj) | Anderson; Onika Maraj; Palacios; Clark | Da Internz | 3:38 |
| 16. | "Freshman 10" (Bonus Track) | Anderson; Chauncey Hollis; Brook Oba Rowland; Daoud Anthony; Westen Weiss | Hit-Boy; Daoud Anthon; Westen Beats | 3:52 |
| Total length: | | | | 62:00 |

Notes

- (co.) denotes co-producer
- (add.) denotes additional production

Sample credits

- "My Last" contains a sample of "Can You Stand the Rain" performed by New Edition.
- "Don't Tell Me You Love Me" contains a sample of "Breakeven" performed by The Script.
- "Wait for Me" contains a sample of "It's Too Late" performed by Wilson Pickett.
- "Marvin & Chardonnay" contains an interpolation of "Amazing" performed by Kanye West.
- "Dance (Ass)" contains a sample of "U Can't Touch This" performed by MC Hammer, and contains the elements from "Back That Azz Up" performed by Juvenile.
- "High" contains a sample of "Fighter Plane" performed by Ellie Goulding.
- "So Much More" contains a sample of "Been This Way Before" performed by Roger Troutman.
- "Celebrity" contains a sample of "The Only Thing I Would Wish For" performed by Angela Bofill.
- "My House" contains a sample of "Ain't There Something Money Can't Buy" performed by Young-Holt Unlimited.

== Charts ==
=== Weekly charts ===
| Chart (2011) | Peak Position |
|---|---|
| Canadian Albums (Billboard) | 20 |
| US Billboard 200 | 3 |
| US Top R&B/Hip-Hop Albums (Billboard) | 2 |

=== Year-end charts ===
| Chart (2011) | Position |
|---|---|
| US Billboard 200 | 125 |
| US Top R&B/Hip-Hop Albums (Billboard) | 36 |
| Chart (2012) | Position |
| US Top R&B/Hip-Hop Albums (Billboard) | 55 |

== Certifications ==
| Region | Certification | Certified units/sales |
|---|---|---|
| United States (RIAA) | Platinum | 1,000,000^{‡} |
^{‡} Sales+streaming figures based on certification alone.
