= All the Way Turnt Up =

Single by Roscoe Dash featuring Soulja Boy Tellem

from the album Ready Set Go!
- Released: January 1, 2010
- Genre: Hip hop; trap; rock rap
- Length: 4:55
- Label: MMI; Zone 4; MusicLine Group; Interscope
- Songwriters: Jeffery Johnson Jr.; DeAndre Way
- Producers: Vybe Beatz; K.E. on the Track

Roscoe Dash singles chronology
"All the Way Turnt Up" (2010)	"Show Out" (2010)

Soulja Boy singles chronology
"Bingo" (2010)	"All the Way Turnt Up" (2010)	"Sponsor" (2010)

"All the Way Turnt Up" is a song by American rapper Roscoe Dash, released by Zone 4, MusicLine Group and Interscope Records on January 1, 2010, as both the rapper's debut single and the lead single from his debut album Ready Set Go! (2010). The song features a guest appearance from fellow rapper Soulja Boy, and was produced by Vybe Beatz and K.E. on the Track.

== Background ==
The song's original version, titled "Turnt Up", was released in September 2009. This version featured guest appearances from Atlanta rap trio Travis Porter and rapper YT; its release promoted a feud between Travis Porter and Roscoe Dash, because Travis Porter made Roscoe Dash (ATL was Roscoe Dash's stage name at the time) a featured artist of the song on one of the group's mixtapes in 2009; after finding this out Dash removed the group from the song and re-recorded it with Soulja Boy. The remix of the original version of "Turnt Up" appears on Roscoe Dash's mixtape Can't Catch the Lambo, which was released in March 2010.

== Music video ==
The video features Roscoe Dash and Soulja Boy performing the song in a stadium. It features a skateboarder trying to jump a gap but continuously falling each time, until the end of the video, in which he jumps and clears the gap. Also, the video features the Joseph Wheeler High School basketball team, coming off a loss and needing inspiration.

== Remixes and other versions ==
Several remixes and freestyles have been recorded by other artists, including Machine Gun Kelly, Hodgy Beats, Nappy Boy, Fabolous, Ludacris, and Lupe Fiasco.

== Charts ==
=== Weekly charts ===
Chart (2010)	Peak position
US Billboard Hot 100	46
US Hot R&B/Hip-Hop Songs (Billboard)	18
US Hot Rap Songs (Billboard)	10
US Rhythmic Airplay (Billboard)	32

=== Year-end charts ===
Chart (2010)	Position
US Hot R&B/Hip-Hop Songs (Billboard)	67
