= Marvin & Chardonnay =

Single by Big Sean featuring Kanye West and Roscoe Dash

from the album Finally Famous
- Released: July 12, 2011
- Recorded: 2010–11
- Genre: Hip hop
- Length: 3:43
- Label: GOOD Music; Def Jam
- Songwriters: Sean Anderson; Kanye West; Jeffrey Johnson; Andrew "Pop" Wansel
- Producers: Pop Wansel; Mike Dean (add.)

Big Sean singles chronology
"My Last" (2011)	"Marvin & Chardonnay" (2011)	"Lay It on Me" (2011)

Kanye West singles chronology
"E.T." (2011)	"Marvin & Chardonnay" (2011)	"Otis" (2011)

Roscoe Dash singles chronology
"Let It Fly" (2011)	"Marvin & Chardonnay" (2011)	"Good Good Night" (2011)

Music video
- "Marvin & Chardonnay" on YouTube

"Marvin & Chardonnay" is a song by American rapper Big Sean featuring fellow American rappers Kanye West and Roscoe Dash, released as the second single from the former's debut studio album, Finally Famous. The song was written by the artists alongside producer Andrew "Pop" Wansel with additional production from Mike Dean. It was sent to urban contemporary radio stations on July 12, 2011, and to Rhythmic radio on July 26, 2011. In the chorus of the song, Roscoe Dash references late American R&B/soul music singer Marvin Gaye and white wine chardonnay. The song was originally called "Marvin Gaye & Chardonnay".

== Background ==
Big Sean spoke about how the song came together in an interview with Billboard, saying,

It was all Kanye’s creation. He gave me the beat, Roscoe was already on it. He was in Paris, I was in LA and he hit me and was like like, ‘yo, you should put this on your album.’ It was perfect. It was a key necessity for it. We wrote our verses over the phone and just knocked it out.

== Music video ==
The music video for "Marvin & Chardonnay" premiered on September 7, 2011, on Vevo. It was directed by Hype Williams. It features appearances from both Kanye West and Roscoe Dash. He also premiered on the video on BET's 106 & Park the week of, reaching number one on the countdown. The video is similar to other Hype Williams directed videos: Twista's "Give It Up" and Kanye West's "Gold Digger".

== Chart performance ==
Marvin & Chardonnay debuted at number 88 on the US Billboard Hot 100 chart on the week of August 5, 2011. On the week October 8, 2011, the single later reached its peak position at number 32 on the chart. On September 23, 2014, the song was certified platinum by the Recording Industry Association of America (RIAA) for sales of over a million copies in the United States.

== Track listing ==
Digital download (as an album-track only)

1. "Marvin & Chardonnay" (featuring Kanye West and Roscoe Dash) – 3:43

== Charts ==
=== Weekly charts ===
Chart (2011–12)	Peak position
US Billboard Hot 100	32
US Hot R&B/Hip-Hop Songs (Billboard)	1
US Hot Rap Songs (Billboard)	4
US Rhythmic Airplay (Billboard)	10

=== Year-End charts ===
Chart (2011)	Position
US Hot R&B/Hip-Hop Songs (Billboard)	27
US Rhythmic (Billboard)	49
Chart (2012)	Position
US Hot R&B/Hip-Hop Songs (Billboard)	94

== Certifications ==
Region	Certification	Certified units/sales
United States (RIAA)	Platinum	1,000,000^{‡}
^{‡} Sales+streaming figures based on certification alone.

== Radio history ==
Country	Date	Format	Label
United States	July 12, 2011	Urban contemporary	G.O.O.D. Music, Def Jam
United States	July 26, 2011	Rhythmic	G.O.O.D. Music, Def Jam
