= Maino (rapper) =

American rapper (born 1973)

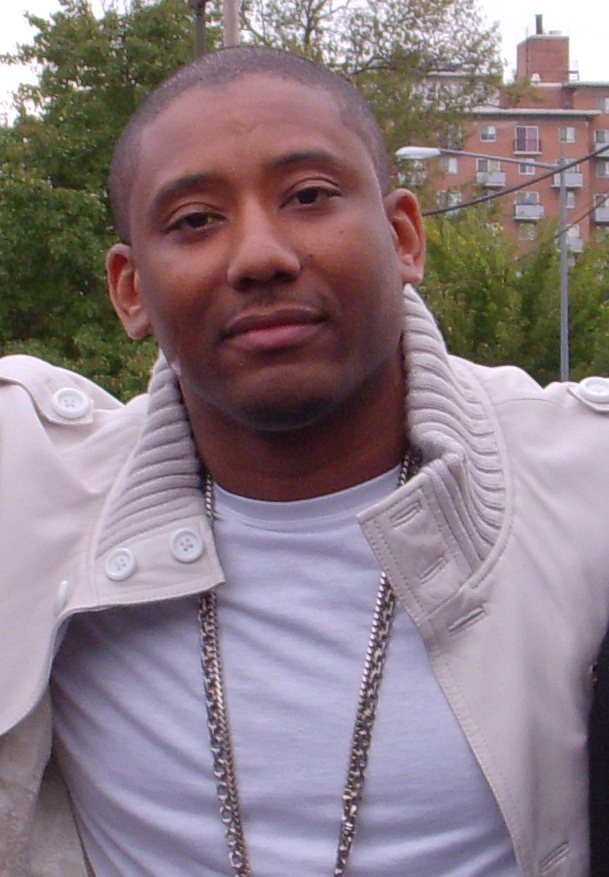
- Maino in 2009

Background information
- Born: Jermaine Coleman; August 30, 1973 (age 53); New York City, U.S.
- Genres: Hip hop
- Occupations: Rapper; songwriter; radio personality
- Works: Maino discography
- Years active: 2003–present
- Labels: Hustle Hard; Atlantic; E1; Universal Motown; Motown
- Member of: The Black Flag Mafia; Lobby Boyz
- Website: mainohustlehard.com

Jermaine Coleman (better known by his stage name Maino; born August 30, 1973) is an American rapper and radio personality. After an ineffective tenure with Universal Motown Records, he signed with Atlantic Records and released his 2008 debut single, “Hi Hater,” which entered several Billboard charts. His 2009 follow-up single, “All the Above” (featuring T-Pain), peaked within the top 40 of the Billboard Hot 100 and received platinum certification from the Recording Industry Association of America (RIAA). Both songs preceded the release of his debut studio album, If Tomorrow Comes… (2009), which peaked at number 25 on the Billboard 200. Its sequel, The Day After Tomorrow (2012), peaked at number 94 and was supported by the single "Let It Fly" (featuring Roscoe Dash).

== Life and career ==
=== Early life and career beginnings ===
Jermaine Coleman was born in Brooklyn, New York City. In the early 1990s, Maino was involved in a "drug related kidnapping," that led to a 5-to-15 years prison sentence: "We didn't really know what we were doing," he recalls. "We had a great idea, I guess, but we wound up getting caught." During his decade-long prison term, Maino began rapping as a result of boredom: "I'd be in the box for twenty-three hours a day, I just started rapping as something to do. I feel like hip hop kept me alive."

While listening to DJ Clue mixtapes featuring some of "Brooklyn's Finest" – Notorious B.I.G, Jay-Z, Lil' Kim – the vibe only got stronger. Maino adopted the "no writing" technique of emceeing: "I was never comfortable writing my raps down." Upon his release in 2003, Maino immediately launched independent record label Hustle Hard Entertainment. After several mixtape releases and key guest features, in June 2005 Maino was offered a recording contract by Universal Motown Records. Maino parted ways with the label on August 27, 2007.

=== 2007–present: If Tomorrow Comes... and The Day After Tomorrow ===
On August 28, 2007, Maino later signed himself and his Hustle Hard imprint to Atlantic Records. He then began working on his debut album, If Tomorrow Comes.... His commercial debut single, titled "Hi Hater," was released in April 2008. Maino later released the song's official remix, featuring fellow American rappers T.I., Swizz Beatz, Plies, Jadakiss and Fabolous. The album's second single was "All the Above," featuring T-Pain. "All the Above" is Maino's first song to chart on the Billboard Hot 100. It debuted at #54 and then rose to #39 the next week.

It also peaked at #10 on the Hot Rap Tracks, #59 on the Hot R&B/Hip-Hop Songs chart, and #46 on the Pop 100. The single is certified platinum and is Maino's only Top 40 hit to date. The album's third single "Million Bucks," features vocals and production from Swizz Beatz. If Tomorrow Comes... debuted at number 25 on the Billboard 200 with first-week sales of 18,000 copies in the United States. In 2008, Maino also crafted an original song titled "Getaway Driver", for the Grand Theft Auto IV video game.

On February 2, 2010, Maino released Unstoppable, exclusively through iTunes; an extended play (EP) which featured four new recordings. On July 5, 2011, Maino announced his second studio album, entitled The Day After Tomorrow, would still be pushed by Atlantic Records, but it would be distributed by E1 Music The album's lead single "Let It Fly", features Atlanta rapper-singer Roscoe Dash. It debuted on the US Billboard Hot R&B/Hip-Hop Songs at number 57. The Day After Tomorrow, unlike Maino's debut album, had lower sales, debuting at number 94 on the Billboard 200.

Through his label Hustle Hard, Maino formed a rap group called The Black Flag Mafia, which includes himself, Push!, Lucky Don, Twigg Martin and Hustle Hard Mouse. On October 9, 2012, they released their first mixtape, The Mafia. They are currently working on their EP album for E1 Music. On February 4, 2014, Maino released a digital EP, King Of Brooklyn EP. In 2018 he did a duet with RRose RRome.

In 2015, Maino recorded "Crazy" with Erika Jayne which resulted in a number one dance hit in the US.

== Legal issues ==
Maino spent 10 years in prison for robbing and kidnapping a drug dealer.

In October 2014, porn actress Mellanie Monroe alleged that Maino assaulted her. Video evidence showed that no assault occurred and Maino was cleared of all charges.

In the 2016 Irving Plaza shooting, he was cleared of any responsibility in the shooting with an NYPD Chief saying "We do not believe that he (Maino) was involved in the dispute."

== Discography ==
Studio albums

- If Tomorrow Comes... (2009)
- The Day After Tomorrow (2012)

Collaborative albums

- The Lobby Boyz (with Jim Jones) (2022)
