= My Last =

Single by Big Sean featuring Chris Brown

from the album Finally Famous
- Released: March 1, 2011
- Recorded: 2010
- Genre: Hip hop; R&B
- Length: 4:14; 5:19 (extended version)
- Label: GOOD Music; Def Jam
- Songwriters: Sean Anderson; Chris Brown; Dion Wilson; James Harris III; Terry Lewis
- Producer: No I.D.

Big Sean singles chronology
| "What Yo Name Iz? (Remix)" (2011) | "My Last" (2011) | "Marvin & Chardonnay" (2011) |

Chris Brown singles chronology
| "Champion" (2011) | "My Last" (2011) | "One Night Stand" (2011) |

"My Last" is a song by American rapper Big Sean featuring American singer Chris Brown. Produced by No I.D., it was released on March 1, 2011 as the lead single from the former's debut album Finally Famous.

== Background ==
Originally, Sean performed both the verses and the chorus but after Brown went at one of Sean's shows, the pair connected and Brown suggested the two work together on a song which resulted in Brown singing the chorus. Brown has also done a freestyle over the track titled "Last", contained in his 2011 mixtape Boy In Detention.

=== Production ===
"My Last" is a hip hop and R&B song. The song's instrumental was described by Rap-Up as a "bouncy piano-laced beat". DJBooth.net described the beat as "soft keyboard chords that transition well into the hook where a low bass and snare set the pace for Sean's first verse." Sean revealed he originally rejected the beat but gave it a chance after pressurings by the song's producer No I.D. The song's melody is sampled from the 1988 New Edition hit "Can You Stand the Rain".

=== Theme ===
Sean described the song as a "real great party song."

== Music video ==
The music video was shot in West Hollywood, California on March 8, 2011. The music video is directed by TAJ Stansberry and features cameos by former GOOD Music artist Kid Cudi and current GOOD Music artist Teyana Taylor. It debuted on VEVO on March 24, 2011. The music video on YouTube has received over 70 million views as of May 2024.

== Critical reception ==
Critical reception of the song has been mostly positive with praise going to the chorus and Sean's verses. Chicago Now described the song as featuring a memorable chorus, memorable verses, and a universal theme praising Big Sean's verses. DJBooth.net also praised Sean's lyrical abilities.

== Charts ==
=== Weekly charts ===
| Chart (2011) | Peak position |
|---|---|
| US Billboard Hot 100 | 30 |
| US Pop Airplay (Billboard) | 40 |
| US Hot R&B/Hip-Hop Songs (Billboard) | 4 |
| US Hot Rap Songs (Billboard) | 1 |
| US Rhythmic Airplay (Billboard) | 4 |

=== Year-end charts ===
| Chart (2011) | Position |
|---|---|
| US Billboard Hot 100 | 100 |
| US Hot R&B/Hip-Hop Songs (Billboard) | 7 |
| US Rhythmic (Billboard) | 19 |

== Certifications ==
| Region | Certification | Certified units/sales |
|---|---|---|
| New Zealand (RMNZ) | Gold | 15,000^{‡} |
| United States (RIAA) | Platinum | 1,000,000^{‡} |
^{‡} Sales+streaming figures based on certification alone.
