= Hi Hater =

2008 single by Maino

Single by Maino

from the album If Tomorrow Comes...
- B-side: "Be Me"
- Released: April 29, 2008
- Recorded: 2008
- Genre: Hip hop
- Length: 3:30
- Label: Atlantic
- Songwriters: Jermaine John Coleman; Roger Greene; Russell Simmons; Jimmy Spicer
- Producers: Mista Raja; Maino (co-producer)

Maino singles chronology
| "Hi Hater" (2008) | "All the Above" (2009) |

Alternate cover

"Hi Hater" is a song by American rapper Maino, released as his commercial debut single and the lead single from his debut album, If Tomorrow Comes... (2009). The song is used in the video game Midnight Club: Los Angeles.

== Background ==
The song was co-produced by Mista Raja and Maino. The song primarily samples hip hop legend Jimmy Spicer's hit song, "Money (Dollar Bill Y'all)".

== Music video ==
The music video for the song was directed by Dan the Man and mostly takes place in Bed-Stuy, Brooklyn, which is Maino's hometown.

== Charts ==
| Chart (2008) | Peak position |
|---|---|
| US Bubbling Under Hot 100 (Billboard) | 8 |
| US Hot R&B/Hip-Hop Songs (Billboard) | 26 |
| US Hot Rap Songs (Billboard) | 16 |

== Remix ==
"Hi Hater (Remix)"

Song by Maino featuring T.I., Swizz Beatz, Plies, Jadakiss and Fabolous

from the album Maino Is the Future
- Released: June 1, 2008
- Recorded: 2008
- Genre: Hip hop
- Length: 4:26
- Label: Hustle Hard, Atlantic
- Songwriters: Jermaine John Coleman; Roger Greene; Russell Simmons; Jimmy Spicer
- Producers: Coalition Forces, Maino (co-producer)

Music video
- "Hi Hater (Remix)" on YouTube

A remix of "Hi Hater" was released in June 2008, featuring guest appearances from fellow American rappers Swizz Beatz, T.I., Plies, Jadakiss and Fabolous. The remix was included on Maino's fourth mixtape Maino is the Future, which was hosted by Big Mike and released in October 2008.

=== Music video ===
The music video for the remix, directed by Mazik Saevitz, was released September 11, 2008. It was shot at Cinema World Studios in Brooklyn, where American recording artists Lil Wayne, Mýa, Big Kuntry King, Common and Red Cafe, all showed up to make cameo appearances.

The set up of the video begins with T.I. parodying P. Diddy's appearance in the "Flava in Ya Ear (Remix)" music video, when he says "Hatas, Come out and play" while knocking two coke bottles together, which in turned parodied The Warriors. The video features the artist in front of a white background, rapping there verses. At the end of each of the verses, The artists' hand prints appear on screen in different colors, Maino's purple at the end of the video, T.I.'s orange, Swizz Beatz's dark green, Plies's yellow, and Jadakiss's blue. Fabolous does not use his hand, but uses the hand of one of the video girls, the last hand print is pink.
