= Roscoe Dash =

American rapper (born 1990)

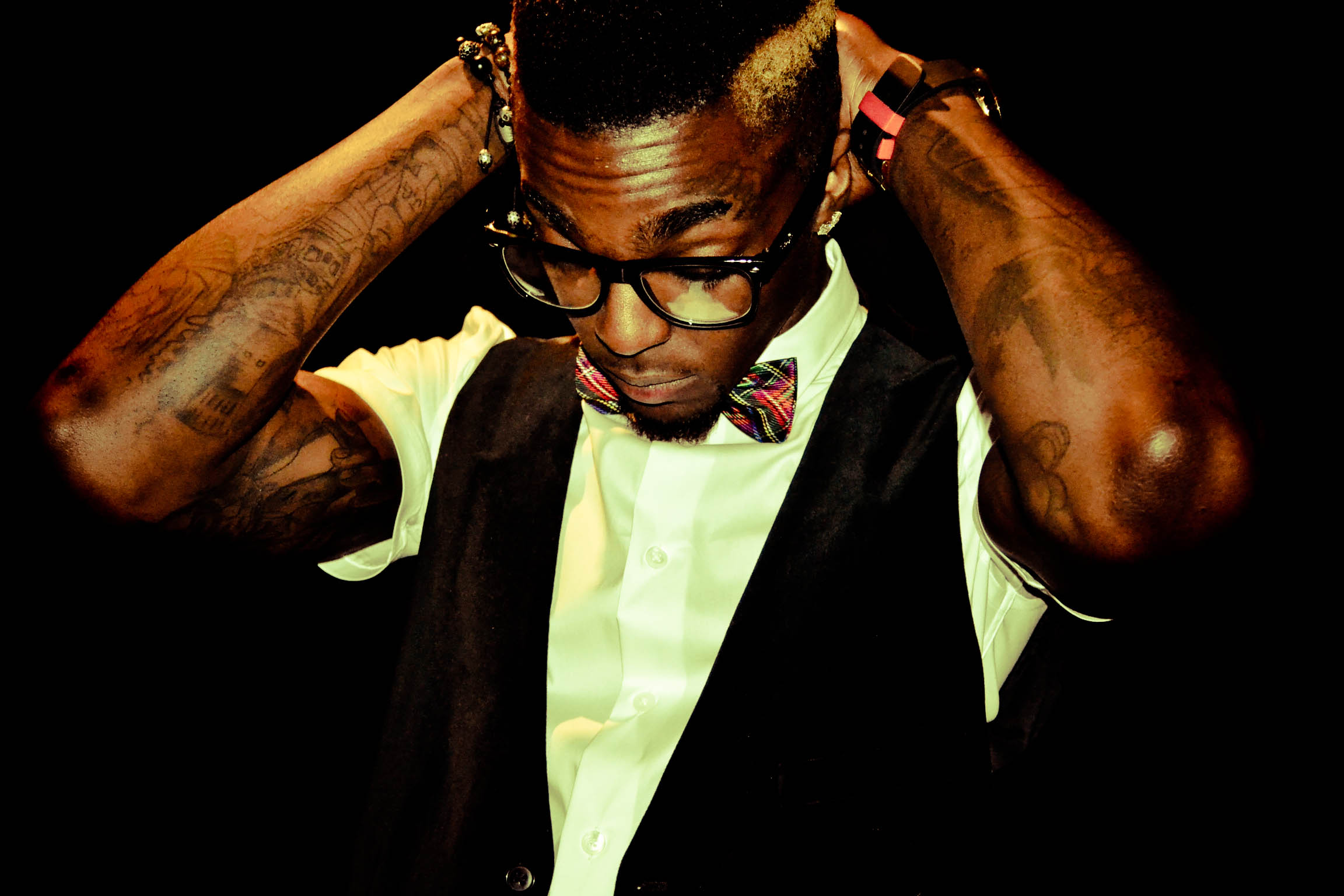
- Roscoe Dash in 2012

Background information
- Also known as: Roscoe Dash 2.0; ATL
- Born: Jeffrey Lee Johnson Jr. April 2, 1990 (age 36)
- Origin: Atlanta, Georgia, U.S.
- Genres: Hip-hop; pop rap
- Occupations: Rapper; singer; songwriter
- Works: Roscoe Dash discography
- Years active: 2008–present
- Labels: Dreamers Republic; MusicLine; Geffen; Def Jam; Making Moves, Inc.; Zone 4; Interscope
- Children: 1
- Website: roscoedash.com

Jeffery Lee Johnson Jr. (born April 2, 1990), better known by his stage name Roscoe Dash, is an American rapper and singer. He is best known for his guest appearance alongside Wale on Waka Flocka Flame's 2010 single "No Hands," which peaked at number 13 on the Billboard Hot 100 and received diamond certification by the Recording Industry Association of America (RIAA). He signed with Zone 4, Geffen, and Interscope Records to release his debut single, "All the Way Turnt Up" (featuring Soulja Boy), in January of that year, which peaked within the top 50 of the chart and preceded his debut studio album, Ready Set Go! (2010). Due to erroneous circumstances regarding its release, it failed to chart and was admitted by Roscoe Dash himself to be unfinished.

Roscoe Dash guest appeared alongside Kanye West on Big Sean's 2011 single "Marvin & Chardonnay," which peaked at 32 on the Billboard Hot 100. His debut extended play (EP), J.U.I.C.E. (2011), was released in December of that year and lukewarmly entered the Billboard 200.

== Career ==
=== 2002–2009: Career beginnings ===
Johnson started rapping at the age of 12, after his older brother introduced him to hip-hop. While attending in Mill Creek High School, he, his brother, and two other rappers formed a rap group who went by the name Black Out Boiz, for which Johnson adopted the stage name "ATL". Though the group released one project to positive feedback, Johnson parted ways with the group in favor of pursuing solo work. His first project, My Turn, was released on MySpace. In his basement, he continued recording mixtapes; this activity led him to connect with his cousin Torrey Hood, who was managing a local hip hop trio by the name of Travis Porter.

Johnson began touring and recording with Travis Porter, and started negotiating a contract with their manager, Charlie Jabaley. On August 1, 2009, Porter's second mixtape, I'm a Differenter 2, was released, and an early version of Johnson's song, "All the Way Turnt Up", was part of the tracklist. Johnson, despite writing and performing the song, was credited as a guest performer under the name "ATL." According to Porter, this was a mistake. Perhaps in spite of this, Johnson knew he had to create a solo identity to further his career. He Googled names of comic book heroes, and came across the name "Roscoe Dash." Johnson says:

"I needed something more marketable. I needed something that would catch the ears and eyes of whoever was listening or reading the name Roscoe Dash and make them want to do research on Roscoe Dash."

He then met local entrepreneur LA da Boomman in 2009, who then signed him to his production company, Making Moves Inc. (MMI). Johnson later signed onto a joint venture with A&R representative Anthony Tate, and the Interscope Records-distributed label Zone 4, after Tate and Johnson spoke with music producer and the latter label's founder, Polow da Don.

=== 2010–2013: Ready Set Go! and J.U.I.C.E. ===
Shortly after its original release, Dash re-recorded "All the Way Turnt Up", and included a guest verse from fellow Atlanta-native Soulja Boy. After the version became a radio hit, Dash signed with Interscope Records before its commercial release on January 1, 2010. Dash then began recording for his debut studio album, titled Ready Set Go!, although it was leaked and shipped before the official release date. The following year, Dash guest featured on the single "No Hands" by fellow Atlanta native Waka Flocka Flame, alongside Washington D.C. rapper Wale. The song received diamond certification by the Recording Industry Association of America (RIAA), peaked at number 13 on the Billboard Hot 100 and earned the "Club Banger of the Year" at the 2011's BET Hip Hop Awards; Johnson received a nomination at the ASCAP Music Awards in 2011.

In December 2011, Johnson released his first extended play (EP), J.U.I.C.E.. Johnson also appeared on Big Sean's single single "Marvin & Chardonnay", which peaked within the top 40 of the Billboard Hot 100. In 2012, Johnson was featured on the cover of XXL magazine, as part of their annual "Top 10 Freshmen list", along with fellow rappers Iggy Azalea, Danny Brown, Kid Ink, Future, Hopsin, Macklemore, French Montana, Don Trip and Machine Gun Kelly.

=== 2014–present: Mixtapes ===
On August 29, 2014, Dash released his mixtape, titled The Appetizer hosted by DJ Fly Guy. In June 2015, Dash released the track, called "Catch A Body", in which is currently off of his upcoming studio album, titled Dash Effect 2, under new booking management and is seeking a major comeback after his last few years of silence. In March 2016, Dash released a new mixtape, titled Glitch presented and hosted by his then DJ, DJ Fly Guy.

== Claims of uncredited songwriting ==
On September 20, 2012, Dash claimed via Twitter that he was an uncredited songwriter on G.O.O.D. Music's Cruel Summer album and Wale's song "Lotus Flower Bomb" with Miguel. Wale responded "Nighas be wellin on twitter", while Miguel responded in a statement to Complex, saying, "As far as I know, Wale and another artist that I recently met penned the original 'Lotus Flower Bomb' chorus and I came in and added the second half or the end part of the chorus [...] Twitter is definitely not the place to handle business per se [sic]. If he wanted to get that rectified, he would have his lawyer contact the proper people."

== Discography ==
- Ready Set Go! (2010)

== Awards and nominations ==
=== BET Hip Hop Awards ===
Year	Nominee / work	Award	Result
2011–2020	"No Hands"	Best Collaboration	Nominated
2011–2020	"No Hands"	Best Club Banger	Won
