= Saba discography =

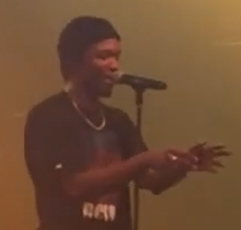
- Studio albums: 4
- EPs: 2
- Singles: 31
- Mixtapes: 3
- Collaborative albums: 2

American rapper and record producer Saba has released four studio albums, two collaborative albums, two extended plays, three mixtapes, 31 singles (including 4 as a featured artist).

In October 27, 2016, Saba released his first album, Bucket List Project. It was produced and released all by Saba. The album features guest appearances from Akenya, BJRKNC, Jean Deaux, Joseph Chilliams, LEGIT, Matthew Santos, Noname, Phoelix, Ravyn Lenae, Smino and Twista.

Care for Me is the second studio album by Saba. It was released on April 5, 2018. The album was produced entirely by daedaePIVOT, Daoud and Saba. The album also includes guest appearances from theMIND, Kaina and Chance the Rapper.

== Studio albums ==
Title	Album details	Peak chart positions	
		US; R&B/HH	US; Ind.
Bucket List Project	Released: October 27, 2016; Label: Saba Pivot, LLC.; Formats: Digital download, vinyl	50	—
Care for Me	Released: April 5, 2018; Label: Saba Pivot, LLC.; Formats: Digital download, vinyl	—	—
Few Good Things	Released: February 4, 2022; Label: Pivot Gang, LLC; Formats: CD, Digital download, vinyl	—	
C0FFEE!	Released: October 31, 2025; Label: Saba Pivot, LLC; Formats: CD, Digital download, vinyl	—	44

== Collaborative Albums ==
List of collaborative albums with selected details
Title	Album details	Peak chart positions	
Title	Album details	US R&B/HH	US Ind.
You Can't Sit with Us (with Pivot Gang)	Released: April 19, 2019; Format: Digital download	—	—
From the Private Collection of Saba and No I.D. (with No I.D.)	Released: March 18, 2025; Label: From the Private Collection, LLP; Formats: CD, Digital download	—	—
"—" denotes a recording that did not chart or was not released in that territory.

== Mixtapes ==
Title	Album details
Get Comfortable	Released: December 21, 2012; Label: Saba Pivot, LLC.; Formats: Digital download
JIMMY (with Pivot Gang)	Released: October 15, 2013; Formats: Digital download
Comfort Zone	Released: July 15, 2014; Label: Saba Pivot, LLC.; Formats: Digital download

== EPs ==
Title	Album details
The Ozymandias EP	Released: 2011; Label: Saba Pivot, LLC.; Formats: Digital download
SpareChange!	Released: September 25, 2015; Label: Saba Pivot, LLC.; Formats: Digital download
Two Piece Tour Pack (with Pivot Gang)	Released: August 5, 2019; Format: Digital download

== Singles ==
=== As lead artist ===
List of singles as lead artist, showing year released and album name
Title	Year	Album
"GPS" (featuring Twista)	2016	Bucket List Project
"Westside Bound 3" (featuring Joseph Chilliams)	2016	Bucket List Project
"World In My Hands" (featuring Smino & LEGIT)	2017	Bucket List Project
"Monday to Monday"	2017	Non-album singles
"There You Go"	2017	Non-album singles
"Where Ideas Sing" (featuring Daoud)	2017	Non-album singles
"How You Live" (featuring MfnMelo)	2017	Non-album singles
"Busy"	2018	Care For Me
"Life"	2018	Care For Me
"Stay Right Here" (featuring Xavier Omar & Mick Jenkins)	2018	Non-album singles
"Beautiful Smile" (featuring IDK)	2018	Non-album singles
"Excited"	2018	Non-album singles
"Papaya" (featuring daedaePIVOT)	2018	Non-album singles
"Where It's At"	2018	Non-album singles
"Mrs. Whoever"	2020	Non-album singles
"Something in the Water" (featuring Denzel Curry)	2020	Non-album singles
"So and So"	2020	Non-album singles
"Areyoudown? Pt.2" (featuring Tobi Lou)	2020	Non-album singles
"Ziplock"	2021	Non-album singles
"Rich Don't Stop"	2021	Non-album singles
"Black Astronaut"	2021	Non-album singles
"Fearmonger" (featuring Daoud)	2021	Few Good Things
"Stop That"	2021	Few Good Things
"Come My Way" (featuring Krayzie Bone)	2022	Few Good Things
"Survivor's Guilt" (featuring G Herbo)	2022	Few Good Things
"Back In Office" (featuring No ID)	2023	TBA
"hue_man nature" (featuring No ID)	2023	TBA

=== As featured artist ===
List of singles as featured artist, with showing year released, peak chart positions and album name
Title	Year	Peak chart positions		Certifications	Album
Title	Year	US	US R&B /HH	Certifications	Album
"Angels" (Chance the Rapper featuring Saba)	2015	— (Note: "Angels" did not enter the Billboard Hot 100, but peaked at number nineteen on the Bubbling Under Hot 100 Singles chart, which acts as an extension to the Hot 100.)	— (Note: "Angels" did not enter the Billboard Hot R&B/Hip-Hop Songs chart, but peaked at number 4 on the Bubbling Under R&B/Hip-Hop Singles chart, which acts as an extension to the Hot R&B/Hip-Hop Songs chart.)	RIAA: Platinum; RMNZ: Gold	Coloring Book
"Pay the Man (Remix)" (Foster the People featuring JID and Saba)	2017	—	—		Non-album single
"History" (Ursa The Chef featuring Cub-J, Michael King and Saba)	2017	—	—		Non-album single
"Top Again" (Audrey Nuna featuring Saba)	2021	—	—		A Liquid Breakfast
"—" denotes a recording that did not chart or was not released in that territory.

== Guest appearances ==
List of non-single guest appearances, with other performing artists, showing year released and album name
Title	Year	Other artist(s)	Album
"Own Two (Hold You Down)"	2013	The Palmer Squares	Finna
"Everybody's Something"	2013	Chance the Rapper, BJ the Chicago Kid	Acid Rap
"Bacteria/Fungi/Virus"	2013	Vic Spencer	The Rapping Bastard
"Ugly Duckling"	2014	Trevor the Trash Man	Hell Yeah | I Want It All
"Play"	2015	Rich Robbins	Nimbus
"What Kings Do"	2015	Odd Couple, Carl, Taylor Bennett	Chatterbox
"Equinox"	2015	Zaramela	Zaramela on AuidoTree Live
"MIA"	2015	ProbCause	Drifters
"SmthnthtIwnt"	2015	Donnie Trumpet & The Social Experiment	Surf
"Temporary"	2015	Tink	Non-album single
"VIP"	2015	Chris Crack, Sulaiman	Public Domain 4
"Givenchy Coasters"	2015	Chris Crack	Non-album single
"Faded"	2016	Sir Collins, Gianni	Ready Or Not
"Buddha"	2016	Phoelix	Non-album single
"Herstory"	2016	Anthony Pavel	Windows
"Shadow Man"	2016	Noname, Phoelix, Smino	Telefone
"Tears of Legend"	2016	Xavier & The Trill	Trill
"My Wallet"	2016	Jay IDK, Michael Christmas, Jimi Tents	Empty Bank
"Riot"	2016	Trapo	Shade Trees
"Dive Club"	2016	Owen Bones	Dive Club
"Cornerstore"	2016	Joey Purp, TheMIND	iiiDrops
"YES"	2016	Isaiah G & Aaron Deux	Grown Adolescence
"Energies"	2017	Mick Jenkins	Or More; the Anxious
"360"	2017	Zack Villere	Adult Swim Singles 2017
"Ace"	2018	Noname, Smino	Room 25
"Basquiat"	2019	Jamila Woods	Legacy! Legacy!
"Sacrifices"	2019	EarthGang, J. Cole, Smino	Revenge of the Dreamers III
"What a Life"	2019	MFnMelo	Everybody Eats
"Spin Move"	2020	Bas, Smino, The Hics	Revenge of the Dreamers III: Director's Cut
"Plead The .45th"	2021	Smino	Judas and the Black Messiah: The Inspired Album
"Birdsong"	2021	Lute, JID	Gold Mouf
"Hit & Run"	2023	tobi lou, FARADA, Chief Keef, internetboy	'Decent
