= Blue Water Road =

Studio album by Kehlani
- Released: April 29, 2022
- Recorded: 2020–2022
- Genres: R&B; orchestral pop
- Length: 37:53
- Labels: Atlantic; TSNMI
- Producers: DaeDaePIVOT; Daoud; Grades; Happy Perez; Jack LoMastro; Mike Wavvs; Pop Wansel; Rogét Chahayed; Sam Wish; Some Randoms; Wesley Singerman

Kehlani chronology
It Was Good Until It Wasn't (2020)	Blue Water Road (2022)	Crash (2024)

Singles from Blue Water Road
- 1. "Altar" Released: September 15, 2021; 2. "Little Story" Released: February 24, 2022; 3. "Up at Night" Released: March 30, 2022; 4. "Everything" Released: April 29, 2022

Blue Water Road is the third studio album by American singer-songwriter Kehlani. It was released through Atlantic Records and TSNMI on April 29, 2022. The album features guest appearances from Blxst, Justin Bieber, Syd, Jessie Reyez, Ambré, and Thundercat. Production was handled by Pop Wansel, Wesley Singerman, Some Randoms, Mike Wavvs, Jack LoMastro, Sam Wish, Rogét Chahayed, DaeDaePIVOT, Daoud, and Grades. It was executive produced by Wansel and serves as the "lighter" follow-up to Kehlani's previous album, It Was Good Until It Wasn't (2020). Primarily an R&B and orchestral pop record, its lyrics revolve around themes of spirituality, sexuality, emotional clarity, and love.

== Background and promotion ==
In February 2021, during an interview with Rolling Stone, Kehlani shared that they recorded songs originally meant for the deluxe version of their previous album, It Was Good Until It Wasn't (2020), but felt as though the songs would fit better on a separate album. Kehlani formally revealed the album's official title through a trailer on September 14, and revealed that it would be released in the winter. Hours later, they announced the album's lead single, "Altar", which was released the following day. On December 14, Kehlani announced that the album will be delayed due to "a lot [of work] needed before finishing."

blue water road is a destination in my mind. I'm giving everyone access. It's an emotional journey, a sexual journey, and a spiritual journey. To me, the album is like a glass house. It's light, transparent, and the sun is shining right through it.

— Kehlani

On February 24, 2022, Kehlani released the second single of Blue Water Road, "Little Story". In March, during a concert at Lollapalooza in Argentina, Kehlani announced that the album would be released the following month. On March 24, they revealed the album's cover and official release date of April 29. Six days later, they released the album's third single, "Up at Night", which features Canadian singer Justin Bieber. On April 25, Kehlani revealed that they will be releasing a three-part docuseries entitled Blue Water Road Trip, where they took their production company, Honey Shot Productions, "on a road trip to experience the music in nature and reflect on some important aspects of my journey so far". The fourth single, "Everything", was released alongside the album on April 29, 2022.

== Composition ==
Primarily an R&B and orchestral pop record, Blue Water Road contains elements of folk, hip hop, and progressive soul. Lyrics revolve around themes of spirituality, sexuality, emotional clarity, and love. Helen Brown of The Independent wrote that "their conversational vocals bend through the album like sunshine through the water."

== Songs ==
The opener of the album, "Little Story", sees Kehlani sing about people "working and being softer" in a growing relationship over an acoustic guitar, with the lyrics: "I want you to pick up the pen and write me into your story / You know I love a story, only when you're the author". The fourth track, "Wish I Never", is a hip hop-influenced song. On the fifth track, "Up at Night", which features Justin Bieber, the two artists sing about the past of a relationship that prevents them from getting any sleep in the night. The next track, "Get Me Started", which features Syd, sees the two artists address distractions in a relationship with the lyrics: "You need something else / Well, maybe she can do it better". "Altar", the ninth track, includes a heavy drum beat and is dedicated to their friends that died due to drug addiction and ancestors that have taught them things in life. The next track, "Melt", sees them sing about finding a future with a partner, with the lyrics in the second verse: "Matching your breath / Follow your chest up and down / hoping you let / Secrets spill out your mouth". "Tangerine", the eleventh and next track includes similar-themed lyrics about sexual tension: "I can taste me on you". The thirteenth and final track, "Wondering/Wandering", which features Ambré and Thundercat, sees Kehlani sing about their feelings about a relationship over a soft piano, which transitions into an R&B instrumental and ends with noises coming from their daughter, Adeya.

== Critical reception ==
Professional ratings
Aggregate scores
Source	Rating
Metacritic	83/100
Review scores
Source	Rating
Clash	8/10
The Guardian	4/5 stars
The Independent	4/5 stars
The Line of Best Fit	9/10
NME	4/5 stars
Pitchfork	7.9/10

Upon release, Blue Water Road was met with critical acclaim. At Metacritic, which assigns a normalized rating out of 100 to reviews from professional publications, the album received an average score of 83, based on 11 reviews, indicating "universal acclaim".

Writing for The New York Times, Isabelia Herrera praised the album's "delicate warmth", while highlighting a sense of "tenderness not felt since their 2017 studio album, SweetSexySavage." She also noted that what "resonate[s] the deepest" in the album is Kehlani's "candid ruminations on queer desire and estrangement." Shahzaib Hussain of Clash commended the broadness of the album's sonics, with its "shades of chamber pop, folky flourishes and molasses-smooth easy listening gems are a welcome addition to their repertoire; loyalists craving the dark, ambiguous strain of progressive soul Kehlani honed for close to a decade may be left wanting here, but this body of work delicately broadens their musical palette without compromising their rawness or sense of relatability. Kehlani can still be thorny and tempestuous but they've also never been more holistic and soulful than on Blue Water Road." Kate Lloyd of The Telegraph compared Blue Water Road to a "movie soundtrack. String interludes behave like camera pans between scenes; fuzzy production gives everything a dream-like quality." Yolanda Machado of Entertainment Weekly called it Kehlani's "most confident album yet" and compared the album's unfoldment to a "breezy coastal drive — you can practically feel the beachy wind in your hair and hear the lulling tides lapping at the shore, waiting to pull you in. This is vibe music."

=== Rankings ===
Critics' rankings for Blue Water Road
Publication	Accolade	Rank	Ref.
Billboard	20 Best LGBTQ Albums of 2022	—N/a	
Billboard	50 Best Albums of 2022	21	

== Commercial performance ==
Blue Water Road debuted and peaked at number 13 on the US Billboard 200, earning 22,000 album-equivalent units, 15,000 of which deriving from streaming, equating to 20.2 million on-demand streams of the album's songs.

== Track listing ==
Blue Water Road track listing
No.	Title	Lyrics	Music	Producer(s)	Length
1.	"Little Story"	Kehlani Parrish; Destin Conrad	Andrew Wansel; Wesley Singerman; Daniel Klein; Matt Campfield	Pop Wansel; Singerman; Some Randoms; Kuk Harrell^{[v]}	3:18
2.	"Any Given Sunday" (featuring Blxst)	Parrish; Matthew Burdette; Prince-Phabian Graham	Parrish; Burdette; Wansel; Michael Washington, Jr.; Jack LoMastro; Samuel Wishkoski; Prince-Phabian Graham	Wansel; Mike Wavvs; LoMastro^{[c]}; Sam Wish^{[c]}	2:45
3.	"Shooter Interlude"	Parrish	Wansel; Singerman; Klein; Campfield	Wansel; Singerman; Some Randoms; Harrell^{[v]}	1:59
4.	"Wish I Never"	Parrish; Conrad; India Perkins	Wansel; Rogét Chahayed; Richard Walters	Wansel; Chahayed; Harrell^{[v]}	3:03
5.	"Up at Night" (featuring Justin Bieber)	Parrish; Justin Bieber; Conrad; Anthony Clemons Jr.	Trevor Romeo; Nelli Hooper; Rosemarie Windross; Daoud Anthony; Conrad; Wansel; Chahayed	Pop Wansel; Chahayed; Harrell^{[v]}; Josh Gudwin^{[v]}; Stevie Mackey^{[v]}	3:02
6.	"Get Me Started" (featuring Syd)	Parrish; Aziz; Conrad; Sydney Bennett; Jean Deaux; Ravyn Lenae	Wansel; Anthony; Dylan Frank	Pop Wansel; Daoud; DaeDaePIVOT	2:49
7.	"Everything Interlude"	Parrish	Wansel; Nathan Perez	Wansel; Happy Perez	0:36
8.	"More Than I Should" (featuring Jessie Reyez)	Parrish; Jessie Reyez	Wansel; Anthony; Daniel Traynor	Grades; Wansel; Daoud; Harrell^{[v]}	3:20
9.	"Altar"	Parrish; Perkins; Wansel; Anthony; Jacob Collier	Parrish; Perkins; Wansel; Anthony; Collier	Wansel; Daoud; Antonio Tucci Jr.^{[v]}	4:04
10.	"Melt"	Parrish	Wansel; Perez	Wansel; Perez	3:31
11.	"Tangerine"	Parrish; Nija Charles; Graham	Wansel; Perez	Wansel; Perez	2:59
12.	"Everything"	Parrish	Wansel; Perez	Wansel; Perez; Harrell^{[v]}	3:27
13.	"Wondering/Wandering" (featuring Ambré and Thundercat)	Parrish; Perkins; Conrad	Stephen Bruner; Wansel; Klein; Campfield; Conrad	Wansel; Some Randoms; Harrell^{[v]}; Tucci^{[v]}	2:55
Total length:					37:53

Notes

- ^{^[c]} indicates a co-producer
- ^{^[v]} indicates a vocal producer
- "Wish I Never" contains a sample of "Children's Story" by Slick Rick.
- "Up at Night" contains a sample of "Fairplay" by Soul II Soul and Rose Windross.

== Personnel ==
Musicians

- Kehlani – vocals
- Pop Wansel – instrumentation, programming (all tracks); guitar (2), keyboards (2, 4, 5, 7–13)
- Some Randoms – instrumentation, programming (1, 3–5, 13); keyboards (4, 5, 7, 10, 13)
- Wesley Singerman – instrumentation, programming (1, 3)
- Mike Wavvs – instrumentation, keyboards (2)
- Rogét Chahayed – keyboards (4, 5)
- Daoud – bass guitar, guitar (5); instrumentation, programming (6, 8, 9); keyboards (8, 9)
- Peter Lee Johnson – strings (5, 10)
- Ravyn Lenae – background vocals (6)
- daedaePIVOT – instrumentation (6), programming (6)
- Syd – vocals (6)
- Happy Perez – instrumentation, programming (7, 10–12); guitar (10, 12), keyboards (11)
- Larry Gold – strings (7, 12)
- Grades – instrumentation, keyboards, programming (8)
- Jessie Reyez – vocals (8)
- CJ Branch – strings (13)
- Gabe Miller – strings (13)
- Thundercat – vocals (13)
- Ambré – vocals (13)

Technical

- Chris Gehringer – mastering
- Mark "Spike" Stent – mixing
- Antonio Tucci Jr. – engineering (all tracks), vocal engineering (9, 13)
- Damien Lewis – engineering (5)
- Michael Freeman – mix engineering
- Geoff Swan – mix engineering
- Jelli Dorman – vocal engineering (1, 3–5, 8, 12, 13)
- Kuk Harrell – vocal engineering (1, 3, 4, 8, 12, 13)

== Charts ==
Chart performance for Blue Water Road
Chart (2022)	Peak position
Australian Hip Hop/R&B Albums (ARIA)	34
Canadian Albums (Billboard)	83
New Zealand Albums (RMNZ)	34
UK Albums (Official Charts)	97
UK R&B Albums (Official Charts)	4
US Billboard 200	13
US Top R&B/Hip-Hop Albums (Billboard)	8

== Release history ==
Release dates and formats for Blue Water Road
Region	Date	Format(s)	Label(s)	Ref.
Various	April 29, 2022	Cassette; CD; digital download; streaming	TSNMI; Atlantic	
Various	September 30, 2022	Vinyl	TSNMI; Atlantic	
