= Tobi Lou =

Nigerian-American singer, rapper, and record producer

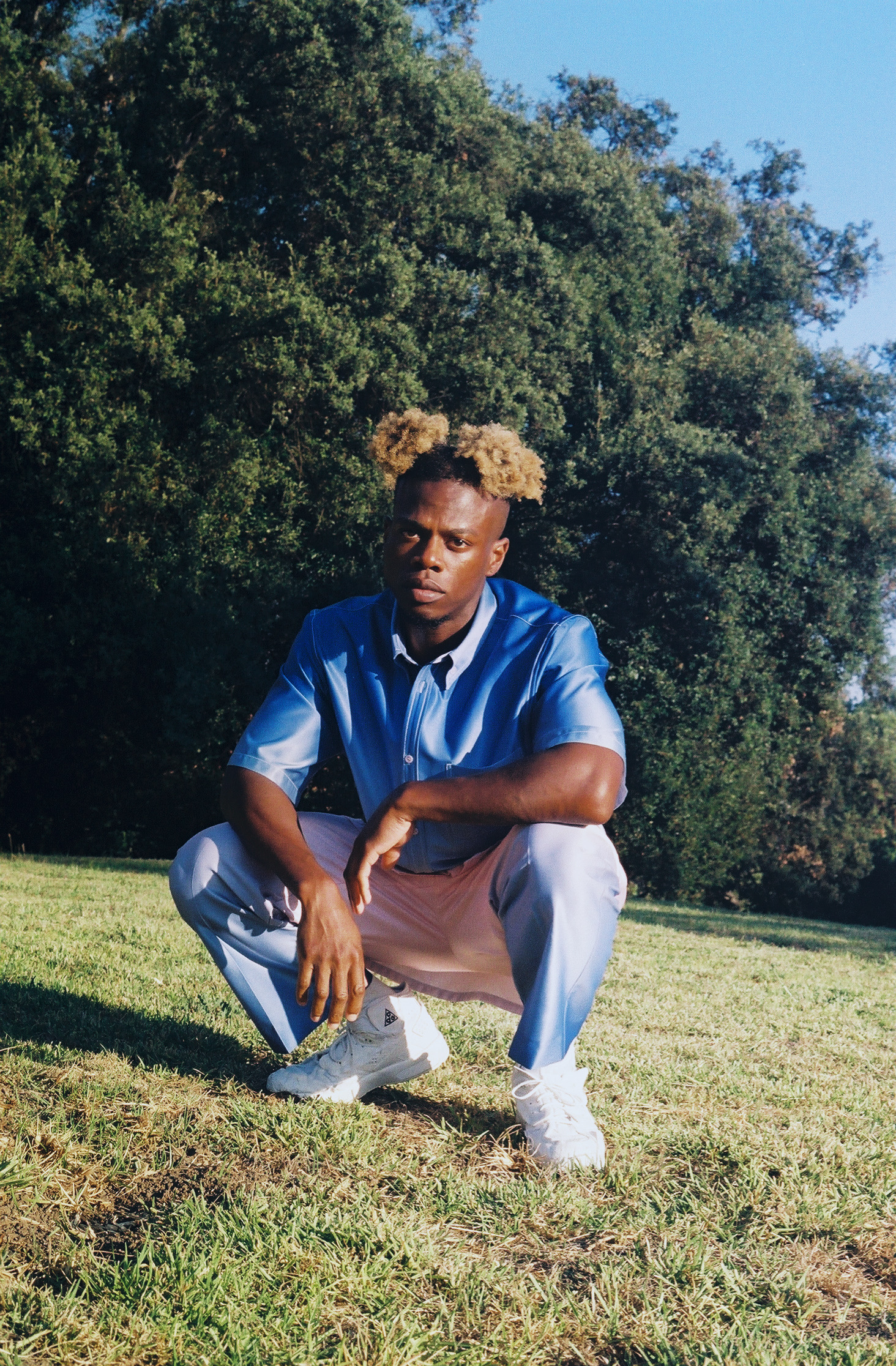
- Tobi Lou in 2020

Background information
- Also known as: Wonda
- Born: Tobi Adeyemi; Lagos
- Origin: Chicago
- Genres: Pop rap; R&B
- Occupations: Singer; songwriter; rapper; record producer
- Years active: 2015–present
- Labels: ArtClub; Empire; Free Agency
- Website: tobilou.com

Tobi Adeyemi, known professionally as Tobi Lou (stylized in lower case), is a Nigerian-American singer, songwriter, rapper and record producer.

== Early life ==
Tobi Adeyemi was born in Lagos, Nigeria. He moved to Chicago, Illinois, United States at age 2, where he was raised. He attended Homewood-Flossmoor High School and Hinsdale Central High School, where he began recording music. He attended the University of Illinois where he played club baseball and then SUNY Albany and Florida A&M University, where he played college baseball for both teams. After not getting drafted in the 2011 MLB draft, he played 2 years of semi-pro baseball for the Joliet Slammers as an outfielder before leaving in 2012 due to injury. In 2014, he moved to Los Angeles to continue his musical career. While in Los Angeles, he worked as an Uber driver.

== Career ==
=== 2015–2018: Beginnings and Tobi lou and the Trilogy ===
On September 16, 2015, Adeyemi released his first single, "Pretty Please". In 2015, he released the single "Your Baby" under the name Wonda. He began releasing music under the name Tobi Lou in 2016. On February 9, 2018, he released his first EP, tobi lou and the Moon. On March 8, 2018, he released the single "Troop" featuring Smino. On March 9, 2018, What So Not released the album Not All the Beautiful Things, which contained the song "Monsters" featuring Adeyemi and Michael Christmas. On April 27, 2018, he released the tobi lou and the Loop EP, which contained the song "Buff Baby", which gained significant traction on TikTok. On June 30, 2020, "Buff Baby" was certified gold by the Recording Industry Association of America. On August 10, 2018, he released the tobi lou and the Juice EP. On October 6, 2018, he debuted on the Billboard Next Big Sound chart, peaking at position 8. On December 18, 2018, Penomeco released his Garden EP, which featured Adeyemi on the song "Cool". Adeyemi and Marc E. Bassy joined Kyle on his 2018 "Lightspeed" tour.

=== 2019–2022: Live on Ice, Lingo Starr, and Non-Perishable ===
In 2019, Adeyemi embarked on his first headlining tour, the "Happy + Extra Sad" tour with Liltrxptendo and Femdot. The tour began on September 12, 2019 in Minneapolis, and ended on October 20, 2019 in Chicago. On August 2, 2019, he released his debut full-length studio album, Live On Ice, featuring guest appearances from Erica René, Cam O'bi, Rockie Fresh, Soundbwoy, Glassface, Vernon, Ryan Destiny, Djemba Djemba, and LeJKeys. The album peaked at 45 on the US Independent Albums Billboard chart and 14 on the US Top Heatseekers chart. On October 19, 2019, he was ranked 50 on the Bandsintown x Billboard US Rising Artists Index. On November 22, 2019, Ryan Destiny released the single "The Same" featuring Adeyemi. Adeyemi was featured on the song "Pray For Real" by Peter CottonTale, alongside Chance the Rapper, on CottonTale's album Catch, which released on April 17, 2020. The song peaked at 24 on the Gospel Airplay chart. Adeyemi was featured on the song "Morocco" by Kota the Friend, on his album Everything, which released on May 22, 2020. On July 3, 2020, he released the Lingo Starr EP. On November 10, 2020, he released the single "Okay" with Dreezy. On November 24, 2020, Saba released the single "Areyoudown? Pt. 2", featuring Adeyemi.

On January 23, 2021, he was ranked 2 on the Billboard Top Chicago Emerging R&B/Hip-Hop Artists 2021 chart. On March 11, 2022, his studio album Non-Perishable was released, featuring guest appearances from T-Pain, Jean Deaux, and Chika. The album peaked at 83 on the Billboard US Top Album Sales chart, 46 on the US Top Current Album Sales chart, and 5 on the US Top Heatseekers chart. On April 2, 2021, Rockie Fresh released the album Slid Thru Pt 2, featuring Adeyemi and Jeff Kaale on the song "Gucci". On March 25, 2022, he was ranked 33 on the Billboard Emerging Artists chart. On July 29, 2022, Warren Hue's album Boy of the Year released, featuring Adeyemi on the song "In My Bag."

=== 2023–present: Baggy Weather and 'Decent ===
On March 31, 2023, he released the album Baggy Weather, featuring guest appearances from Chief Keef and eaJ, as an exclusive on his TobiLoop app. A 'mini-version' of the album was released the same day on streaming services. On May 5, 2023, he released the Sorry I'm Late EP. Adeyemi joined T-Pain on his "Escape From Wiscansin: The Invasion" tour in the summer of 2023. On June 30, 2023, he released the album 'Decent, featuring guest appearances from Dame D.O.L.L.A., Polo G, rä lomac, Glassface, Chief Keef, Saba, and internetboy. In August 2023, he announced the "Perish Blue" tour with grouptherapy. The tour begins on September 21, 2023 in Houston, and ends on October 29, 2023 in Phoenix. On September 15, 2023, he released the single "Cobra" featuring Young Thug. He released the Perish Blue (Fall Tour) EP with producer Farada on September 22, 2023. On October 23, 2023, Adeyemi performed as K'Sante in the League of Legends virtual band Heartsteel, alongside Baekhyun, ØZI, and Cal Scruby, in the band's debut single, "Paranoia". The group performed the song at the 2023 League of Legends World Championship.

He released Young Bopalopalous, a collaborative EP with producer Farada in April 2024. He released his album Diabolical <3 on May 27, 2025 and his album Same Old Jeans (Ripped Jeans) on May 13, 2026.

== Personal life ==
Adeyemi's sister Tomi Adeyemi is a novelist and author of the fantasy novel Children of Blood and Bone.

== Artistry ==
Tobi Lou has stated that artists including André 3000, The Notorious B.I.G., Will Smith, Tupac, NSYNC, Timbaland, Frank Ocean, Missy Elliott, Maroon 5, Pharrell Williams, and Kanye West are inspirations for him.

== Discography ==
=== Studio albums ===
List of studio albums, with selected details
Title	Album details	Peak chart positions			
Title	Album details	US Top Album Sales	US Top Current Album Sales	US Independent Albums	US Top Heatseekers
Live On Ice	Released: August 2, 2019; Label: ArtClub, Empire; Format: Digital download, streaming	-	-	45	14
Non-Perishable	Released: March 11, 2022; Label: ArtClub, Empire; Format: Digital download, streaming	83	46	-	5
Baggy Weather (with Farada)	Released: March 31, 2023; Label: Free Agency; Format: Digital download, streaming	-	-	-	-
'Decent (with Farada)	Released: June 30, 2023; Label: Free Agency; Format: Digital download, streaming	-	-	-	-

=== Extended plays ===
List of extended plays, with selected details
Title	Details
Tobi lou and the Moon	Released: February 9, 2018; Label: ArtClub, Empire; Format: Digital download, streaming
Tobi lou and the Loop	Released: April 27, 2018; Label: ArtClub, Empire; Format: Digital download, streaming
Tobi lou and the Juice	Released: August 10, 2018; Label: ArtClub, Empire; Format: Digital download, streaming
Lingo Starr	Released: July 3, 2020; Label: ArtClub, Empire; Format: Digital download, streaming
Sorry I'm Late (with Farada)	Released: May 4, 2023; Label: Free Agency; Format: Digital download, streaming
Perish Blue (Fall Tour) (with Farada)	Released: September 22, 2023; Label: Free Agency; Format: Digital download, streaming
Young Bopalopalous (with Farada)	Released: April 26, 2024; Label: Free Agency; Format: Digital download, streaming
Diabolical <3	Released: May 27, 2025; Label: Free Agency; Format: Digital download, streaming
Breathing Room <3	Released: June 27, 2025; Label: Free Agency; Format: Digital download, streaming
Dirty Synthesizer <3	Released: August 29, 2025; Label: Free Agency; Format: Digital download, streaming
Crazy Boots <3	Released: February 27, 2026; Label: Free Agency; Format: Digital download, streaming
Same Old Jeans (Ripped Jeans)	Released: May 13, 2026; Label: Free Agency; Format: Digital download, streaming

=== Singles ===
==== As lead artist ====
List of singles, showing year released and album name
Title	Year	Album
"Pretty Please"	2015	non-album single
"Your Baby"	2015	non-album single
"New Bish"	2016	non-album single
"Txt Me"	2016	non-album single
"Hopefully"	2016	non-album single
"Game Ova"	2017	non-album single
"A.R.O.K."	2017	non-album single
"Preoccupied"	2017	non-album single
"Your Kind of Love"	2017	non-album single
"Troop" (feat. Smino)	2018	non-album single
"Darlin'"	2018	Tobi lou and the Loop
"Orange"	2018	Live On Ice
"Like My Mom"	2019	Live On Ice
"Waterboy"	2019	Live On Ice
"My Party" (with Tony Bigz)	2019	Live On Ice
"Uncle Iroh"	2019	non-album single
"Hot Tub Time Machine"	2020	non-album single
"Hot Tub Dream Machine"	2020	non-album single
"Skin Care Tutorial 2020"	2020	non-album single
"Neither Here Nor There"	2020	non-album single
"Pretty Much"	2020	non-album single
"Endorphins"	2020	non-album single
"Student Loans"	2020	non-album single
"Notice Me" (feat. Mia Gladstone)	2020	non-album single
"Okay" (feat. Dreezy)	2020	non-album single
"2hrs"	2020	Non-Perishable
"Wide Open" (feat. Jean Deaux)	2021	Non-Perishable
"Hopeless Romantic"	2022	Non-Perishable
"Some Things"	2023	Perish Blue (Fall Tour)
"Fee"	2023	Perish Blue (Fall Tour)
"Roller Coaster"	2023	Perish Blue (Fall Tour)
"Meteorite"	2023	Perish Blue (Fall Tour)
"Caturday"	2023	Perish Blue (Fall Tour)
"Losing You"	2023	Perish Blue (Fall Tour)
"Block"	2023	Perish Blue (Fall Tour)
"Cobra" (with Young Thug)	2023	Perish Blue (Fall Tour)
"Come See Me Live"	2023	Perish Blue (Fall Tour)
"Food"	2023	non-album single
"Numbers"	2023	non-album single
"Gentle Monster"	2024	non-album single

=== Guest appearances ===
List of guest appearances, showing song title, year released, other artists and album name
Title	Year	Artist(s)	Album
"Day2Day"	2014	Tunji Ige	The Love Project
"Game Ova"	2016	SwuM	Woke
"Name"	2017	Jevon Doe	Non-album single
"Cool"	2018	Penomeco	Garden
"Not the Only One"	2018	Michael Christmas	Role Model
"Monsters"	2018	What So Not, Michael Christmas	Not All The Beautiful Things
"The Same"	2019	Ryan Destiny	non-album single
"Pray for Real"	2020	Peter CottonTale, Chance the Rapper	Catch
"Morocco"	2020	Kota the Friend	Everything
"Areyoudown? Pt. 2"	2020	Saba	non-album single
"Gucci"	2021	Rockie Fresh, Jeff Kaale	Slid Thru Part 2
"In My Bag"	2022	Warren Hue	Boy of the Year
"Paranoia"	2023	Heartsteel, Baekhyun, ØZI, Cal Scruby	non-album single
"贖罪雨 (RainTaTaTa)"	2025	Capper	槍火天使Gun-fire Angel
