= From the Private Collection of Saba and No I.D. =

From the Private Collection of Saba & No I.D.

Studio album by Saba and No I.D.
- Released: March 18, 2025
- Genre: Hip hop; jazz rap
- Length: 41:41
- Label: From the Private Collection, LLP
- Producer: Berlo; DaedaePivot; Daoud; Elijah Fox; Greg Phillinganes; Imari Mubarak; J.Period; Maneesh; No I.D.; Raphael Saadiq; ReXx; Saba; Tommy Skillfinger

Saba chronology
| Few Good Things (2022) | From the Private Collection of Saba and No I.D. (2025) |

No I.D. chronology
| The Sampler, vol. 1 (2002) | From the Private Collection of Saba and No I.D. (2025) |

Singles from From the Private Collection of Saba and No I.D.
- 1. "Head.rap" Released: April 26, 2024; 2. "How to Impress God" Released: October 25, 2024; 3. "Woes of the World" Released: February 4, 2025; 4. "Crash" Released: March 17, 2025

Professional ratings
Aggregate scores
| Source | Rating |
|---|---|
| Metacritic | 90/100 |
Review scores
| Source | Rating |
| Clash | 9/10 |
| Pitchfork | 8.2/10 |
| Rolling Stone | 4/5 stars |

From the Private Collection of Saba and No I.D. is a collaborative studio album by the American rapper Saba and record producer No I.D. The album was released on March 18, 2025, by From the Private Collection, LLP, and features guest appearances by Smino, Kelly Rowland, Jordan Ward, Ogi, Raphael Saadiq, Eryn Allen Kane, BJ the Chicago Kid, Ibeyi, Love Mansuy, and members of Saba's hip-hop collective Pivot Gang. The album marks the first project between the two Chicago artists, who began recording for the album in 2022 before scrapping an earlier mixtape version in favor of a full-length work.

== Background ==
The pair first met in 2018, with No I.D., then the executive vice president of Capitol Records, looking to sign Saba shortly after the release of his second studio album, Care for Me (2018). Though Saba remained an independent artist, he reconnected with No I.D. in 2019 for a recording session after the latter left Capitol.

== Critical reception ==
According to the review aggregator Metacritic, From the Private Collection of Saba and No I.D. received "universal acclaim" based on a weighted average score of 90 out of 100 from 4 critic scores.

=== Accolades ===
| Publication | Accolade | Rank | Ref. |
|---|---|---|---|
| Consequence | The 50 Best Albums of 2025 | 7 | |
| Consequence | The 25 Best Rap Albums of 2025 | 2 | |
| Exclaim! | 50 Best Albums of 2025 | 44 | |
| HotNewHipHop | The 40 Best Rap Albums of 2025 | 19 | |
| Paste | The 25 best rap albums of 2025 | 11 | |
| Rolling Stone | The 25 Best Hip-Hop Albums of 2025 | 17 | |

== Track listing ==
From the Private Collection of Saba and No I.D. track listing
| No. | Title | Writer(s) | Producer(s) | Length |
|---|---|---|---|---|
| 1. | "Every Painting Has a Price" (featuring BJ the Chicago Kid and Eryn Allen Kane) | Tahj Malik Chandler; Bryan Sledge; Ernest Wilson | No I.D. | 3:33 |
| 2. | "Breakdown" | Ta. Chandler; Wilson | Saba; No I.D. | 2:46 |
| 3. | "Crash" (featuring Raphael Saadiq and Kelly Rowland) | Ta. Chandler; Wilson; Greg Phillinganes; Raphael Saadiq | No I.D.; Phillinganes; J.Period | 3:28 |
| 4. | "Woes of the World" | Ta. Chandler; Wilson; Daoud Anthony | No I.D.; Daoud; Maneesh | 3:31 |
| 5. | "Stop Playing with Me" | Ta. Chandler; Wilson; Jimmy Hood | No I.D. | 1:03 |
| 6. | "Westside Bound Pt. 4" (featuring MFnMelo) | Ta. Chandler; Wilson; Martin Anderson; Reese; Kara; Dylan C. Frank; Leo Berliant | Saba; No I.D.; Maneesh; DaedaePivot; Berlo | 4:05 |
| 7. | "Head.rap" (featuring Madison McFerrin, Ogi, and Jordan Ward) | Ta. Chandler; Madison McFerrin; Ogi Ifediora; Jordan Ward | Saba; No I.D.; Daoud | 3:10 |
| 8. | "Acts 1.5" | Ta. Chandler; Wilson | No I.D. | 1:58 |
| 9. | "Reciprocity" (featuring Ibeyi) | Ta. Chandler; Wilson; Lisa-Kaindé Diaz; Naomi Diaz | Saba; No I.D.; Elijah Fox | 1:29 |
| 10. | "Stomping" | Ta. Chandler; Wilson | No I.D.; Saba; Saadiq; ReXx | 1:55 |
| 11. | "Big Picture" (featuring Ogi) | Ta. Chandler; Wilson; Ifediora; Thomas Chandler; Anthony | Saba; No I.D.; Tommy Skillfinger; Daoud | 2:40 |
| 12. | "30secchop" (featuring Joseph Chilliams and Jean Deaux) | Ta. Chandler; Wilson; Jarrel Chandler; Zoi Harris; Imari Mubarak; Philip Bucknor | Saba; No I.D.; Mubarak | 2:27 |
| 13. | "How to Impress God" | Ta. Chandler; Wilson; Anthony | Saba; No I.D.; Daoud | 3:12 |
| 14. | "She Called It" (featuring Frsh Waters and Tru) | Ta. Chandler; Wilson; Anthony; Wood | Saba; No I.D. | 3:12 |
| 15. | "A Few Songs" (featuring Love Mansuy, Ogi and Smino) | Ta. Chandler; Christopher Smith; Wilson; Love Mansuy; L. Diaz; N. Diaz | No I.D. | 3:07 |
| Total length: | | | | 41:41 |
