= Ambré =

American singer and songwriter

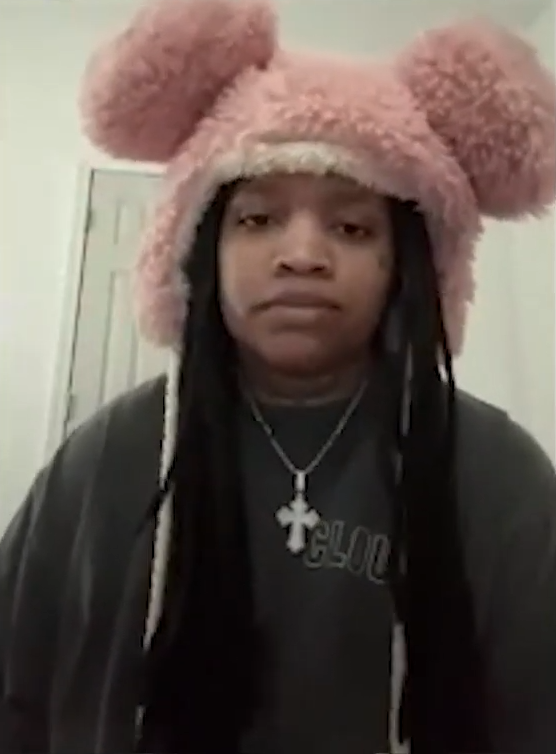
- Ambré in 2024

Background information
- Born: India Ambré Perkins; August 29, 1996 (age 30); New Orleans, Louisiana, U.S.
- Genres: R&B; hip-hop
- Occupations: Singer; songwriter
- Years active: 2015–present
- Label: Roc Nation
- Website: ambremusic.com

India Ambré Perkins (born August 29, 1996), known mononymously as Ambré, is an American singer and songwriter. She is currently signed to Roc Nation. She has released three full-length projects with Wanderlust (2015), 2090's (2016), and 3000° (2022). Her debut major label EP, Pulp, was released in November 2019, by Roc Nation. She first gained recognition after collaborating with Kehlani on a cover of Drake's "Preach" in 2015. She also co-wrote two tracks ("Changes" and "U") which featured on H.E.R.'s 2017 self-titled album, which was nominated for multiple Grammy Awards.

== Early life ==
Ambré Perkins was born and raised in New Orleans, Louisiana. At age 4, she entered into the foster care system and went in and out of multiple homes and schools as a child. As a teenager, she joined a church choir and also performed at various talent competitions. At age 17 in 2014, she met producer Erick Bardales and began making music with him.

== Career ==
In April 2015, Ambré released her first full-length mixtape, Wanderlust, which was produced by Erick Bardales. The following month, she collaborated with Kehlani on a cover of Drake's "Preach". This led to her opening for Kehlani on her "You Should Be Here" tour in the summer of 2015. She also appeared at Kehlani's "Tsunami Christmas" concert in December 2015.

In April 2016, she released her second mixtape, 2090's, which featured 15 tracks. In October of that year, she released a collaborative single with Kehlani called "No Service in the Hills". Ambré again appeared alongside Kehlani at the latter's "Tsunami Christmas" event in December 2016. In March 2017, Ambré performed at the BUKU Music + Art Project in New Orleans. In August 2017, she released the single, "Must Be The Fall". The following month, she was featured alongside Isaiah Rashad and Joey Purp on the TOKiMONSTA track, "No Way". Also that year, two tracks she co-wrote ("Changes" and "U") appeared on H.E.R.'s self-titled album, which would go on to win the Grammy Award for Best R&B Album in 2019.

In February 2018, Ambré was featured on the Keys N Krates track, "Glitter". In September of that year, she was featured on the Ryan Hemsworth song, "The Butterfly Effect". She also starred in the song's accompanying music video. In March 2019, Ambré signed a contract with Universal Music Publishing Group through her management firm, Title 9. In September 2019, she released the single, "fubu", which appears on her 2019 EP, Pulp. That month, she also began touring with Lucky Daye on his "Painted" tour. In November 2019, it was announced that Ambré had been signed to Roc Nation. The label also released her 10-track EP, Pulp, at the time of the announcement.

== Discography ==
=== EPs ===
List of EPs with selected details
Title	Details
Pulp	Release date: November 8, 2019 (US); Label: Roc Nation; Formats: Digital download
3000°	Release date: June 17, 2022 (US); Label: Roc Nation; Formats: Digital download

=== Mixtapes ===
List of mixtapes with selected details
Title	Details
Wanderlust	Released: April 20, 2015 (US); Label: Self-released; Formats: Digital download
2090's	Released: April 27, 2016 (US); Label: Self-released; Formats: Digital download

=== Singles ===
List of singles as a lead artist with selected details
Title	Year	Album
"Faded"	2014	Wanderlust
"Pretty"	2015	Wanderlust
"Goody Goody"	2016	2090's
"No Service in the Hills" (with Kehlani)	2016	Non-album single
"Must Be The Fall"	2017	Non-album single
"fubu"	2019	Pulp
"I'm Baby" (with Jvck James)	2022	3000°

=== Guest appearances ===
List of songs as a featured artist
Title	Year	Album
"No Way" (TOKiMONSTA feat. Isaiah Rashad, Joey Purp, and Ambré)	2017	Lune Rouge
"Glitter" (Keys N Krates feat. Ambré)	2018	Cura
"How Do I Get to Invincible" (The Glitch Mob feat. Ambré)	2018	See Without Eyes
"The Butterfly Effect" (Ryan Hemsworth feat. Ambré)	2018	Elsewhere
"Skyfall" (Pell feat. Ambré and Malik Ninety Five)	2019	Gravity
"Wondering/Wandering" (Kehlani feat. Ambré and Thundercat)	2022	Blue Water Road
"Art of Seduction" (Ab-Soul feat. Ambré)	2022	Herbert
