= You Can't Sit with Us (album) =

2019 debut album by Pivot Gang

Studio album by Pivot Gang
- Released: April 19, 2019
- Genre: Hip hop
- Length: 42:49
- Label: Pivot Gang
- Producers: daedaePIVOT (also exec.); Daoud; squeakPIVOT; Immy; Nascent; Saba; Simon; T-Jay Beats

You Can't Sit with Us is the debut studio album by Chicago hip hop group Pivot Gang. It was self-released on April 19, 2019, available on music digital distribution platforms. The thirteen-track album features guest appearances from Benjamin Earl Turner, Femdot, Jean Deaux, Kari Faux, Mick Jenkins, Smino and Sylvan LaCue.

== Singles and promotion ==
Music videos were released for "Jason Statham, Pt. 2" and "Studio Ground Rules", both directed by Addison Wright. On April 5, the group revealed the album's title, tracklist and artwork, and released the album's third single "Bad Boys" featuring Smino.

== Critical reception ==
Professional ratings
Review scores
Source	Rating
Clash Music	8/10
Consequence of Sound	B+
Pitchfork	7.5/10

Lucy Shanker of Consequence of Sound gave a positive review of the album saying "Over the course of 13 tracks, You Can't Sit with Us flaunts the power of Chicago's Westside. Pivot Gang have no shortage of members or talent, so it seems to almost have been easy for them to create such an exceptional project. It is built up of well-thought-out features and lyrics that are at times witty and others necessarily gruesome. It hosts songs about lust, trauma, and taking care of the ones they care for. The record is a labor of love, and it was also made by completely independent artists, which makes it even more impressive". Editor for HotNewHipHop, Robert Blair, said the album "pays no mind to the pressures of living up to Chicago's rich heritage and instead keeps its sights honed in on a prosperous future. More than an endless stream of punchlines, the record is a thoughtful examination of life's trials and tribulations that's delivered with wry humour, emotion and blistering production".

=== Accolades ===
Publication	List	Rank	Ref.
CLASH	Clash Albums of the Year 2019	32	
Consequence of Sound	Top 50 Albums of 2019	41	
Uproxx	The Best Albums of 2019	35	

== Track listing ==
No.	Title	Writer(s)	Producer(s)	Length
1.	"Death Row"	MFnMelo; Saba; Joseph Chilliams	daedaePIVOT; Daoud	3:14
2.	"Colbert"	Joseph Chilliams; Frsh Waters; Saba	Daoud; squeakPIVOT	3:33
3.	"Mortal Kombat" (featuring Kari Faux)	Saba; Joseph Chilliams; Kari Faux	daedaePIVOT	3:31
4.	"Hero"	Saba; Frsh Waters; MFnMelo	Nascent; daedaePIVOT; Daoud; Simon	3:42
5.	"Bad Boys" (featuring Smino)	Joseph Chilliams; Smino; Saba; MFnMelo	daedaePIVOT; squeakPIVOT (add.)	3:38
6.	"Bible"	Saba; Frsh Waters; DinnerWithJohn	daedaePIVOT; Daoud; Immy; T-Jay Beats	3:38
7.	"No Vest" (featuring Mick Jenkins)	Mick Jenkins; Saba; Joseph Chilliams; MFnMelo	daedaePIVOT; squeakPIVOT (add.)	3:00
8.	"Clark Kent"	Joseph Chilliams; Saba; MFnMelo	daedaePIVOT; Saba; squeakPIVOT	3:44
9.	"Studio Ground Rules"	Saba; Frsh Waters; MFnMelo	Daoud; daedaePIVOT	3:55
10.	"Edward Scissorhands" (featuring Jean Deaux)	Joseph Chilliams; Saba; Jean Deaux	daedaePIVOT; squeakPIVOT	3:19
11.	"Mathematics" (featuring Femdot)	Joseph Chilliams; Saba; Femdot	daedaePIVOT	2:16
12.	"Jason Statham, Pt. 2"	Joseph Chilliams; Saba; MFnMelo	daedaePIVOT; squeakPIVOT	2:24
13.	"Carnival" (featuring Sylvan LaCue and Benjamin Earl Turner)	Joseph Chilliams; Saba; Sylvan LaCue; Frsh Waters; MFnMelo; Benjamin Earl Turner	Daoud	2:55
Total length:				42:49

== See also ==
- 2019 in hip hop music
