= Cry for Help (disambiguation) =

"Cry for Help" is a 1991 single by Rick Astley.

Cry for Help may also refer to:

== Films ==
- Cry for Help (film), a 1928 German silent drama
- A Cry for Help (1912 film), an American silent drama directed by D.W. Griffith
- A Cry for Help (1975 film), a TV movie with Robert Culp
- A Cry for Help: The Tracey Thurman Story, a 1989 NBC TV movie based on the 1985 ruling Thurman v. City of Torrington

== Television ==
- "Cry for Help" (Steven Universe), a 2015 episode of the American animated television series Steven Universe
- "Cry for Help", Season 2, Episode 12 of Daktari, 1966
- "Cry for Help", Season 8, Episode 13 of Quincy M.E., 1983
- "Cry for Help", Season 5, Episode 14 of Combat!, 1966
- "Cry for Help", Season 1, Episode 7 of 24-Hour Call, 1963
- "Cry for Help", Season 2, Episode 4 of Casualty, 1987
- "Cry for Help", Season 2, Episode 4 of General Hospital, 1975
- "A Cry for Help", Season 3, Episode 8 of Emergency-Ward 10, 1967
- "A Cry for Help", Season 1, Episode 10 of Stalker, 2014
- "A Cry for Help", a 2013 episode of The Ricki Lake Show
- "A Cry for Help, Season 1, Episode 1 of Sutherland's Law, 1973
- "A Cry for Help", Season 1, Episode 5 of Call 911, 2008
- "A Cry for Help", Season 2, Episode 2 of Honey, We're Killing the Kids, 2007
- "A Cry for Help", Season 1, Episode 4 of A Bunch of Fives, 1977
- "A Cry for Help" (Upstairs, Downstairs), Season 1, Episode 6 of Upstairs, Downstairs, 1971
- "A Cry for Help", Season 1, Episode 8 of Dr. G: Medical Examiner, 2005
- "The Cry for Help", Season 14, Episode 5 of Horizon, 1977
- "A Cry for Help", Season 2, Episode 1 of Toad Patrol, 2003
- "A Cry for Help", Season 2, Episode 21 of Cagney & Lacey, 1983
- "A Cry for Help", Season 1, Episode 4 of The Lonelyheart Kid, 1984
- "A Cry for Help", Season 2, Episode 9 of T.J. Hooker, 1982
- "A Cry for Help", Season 7, Episode 10 of 7th Heaven, 2002
- "A Cry for Help", Season 1, Episode 4 of Jason of Star Command, 1978
- "A Cry for Help", Season 7, Episode 21 of No Hiding Place, 1965

== Music ==
- "Cry for Help" (HomeTown song), a 2015 single by HomeTown
- Cry for Help (EP), a 2012 EP by Bonfire
- Cry for Help (album), a 1982 album by Super Heroines
- Cry 4 Help, a 2019 EP by Kari Faux
