= Up at Night (song) =

2022 single by Kehlani featuring Justin Bieber

Single by Kehlani featuring Justin Bieber

from the album Blue Water Road
- Released: March 30, 2022
- Length: 3:02
- Label: Atlantic
- Composers: Andrew Wansel; Rogét Chahayed; Trevor Romeo; Nelli Hooper; Rosemarie Windross; Daoud Anthony; Conrad
- Lyricists: Kehlani Parrish; Justin Bieber; Anthony Clemons, Jr.; Destin Conrad
- Producers: Pop Wansel; Chahayed

Kehlani singles chronology
"Little Story" (2022)	"Up at Night" (2022)	"Everything" (2022)

Justin Bieber singles chronology
"Attention" (2022)	"Up at Night" (2022)	"Honest" (2022)

Music video
- "Up at Night" on YouTube

"Up at Night" is a song by American singer Kehlani, featuring vocals from Canadian singer Justin Bieber. It was released through Atlantic Records as the third single from Kehlani's third album, Blue Water Road, on March 30, 2022. The song marks the second collaboration between the two artists, following Bieber's promotional single, "Get Me", from his fifth album, Changes (2020).

== Composition and lyrics ==
"Up at Night" has been described as "ethereal, smooth, and sultry". Kehlani sings over synths, then the song shifts to a dance groove with disco-styled guitar, and Bieber sings his verse. The song plays homage to Soul II Soul and Rose Windross' single "Fairplay".

== Music video ==
The official music video for "Up at Night", directed by Nono & Rogo, was released on May 3, 2022. It sees Kehlani performing with a group as they practice 20th century dance moves. Bieber is not heard or seen in the video.

== Credits and personnel ==
- Kehlani – lead vocals, songwriting
- Justin Bieber – featured vocals, songwriting
- Pop Wansel – production, songwriting, programming, instrumentation
- Rogét Chahayed – production, songwriting
- Ant Clemons – songwriting
- Jazzie B – songwriting
- Destin Conrad – songwriting
- Rosemarie Windross – songwriting
- Daoud – songwriting, guitar, bass guitar
- Nelli Hooper – songwriting
- Anthony Tucci, Jr. – engineer
- Damien Lewis – engineer
- Some Randoms – instrumentation, programming
- Peter Lee Johnson – strings
- Spike Stent – mixing
- Michael Freeman – mixing
- Kuk Harrell – vocal production
- Josh Gudwin – vocal production
- Mark Parfitt – engineer
- Stevie Mackey – vocal production

== Charts ==
Chart performance for "Up at Night"
Chart (2022)	Peak position
Canada Hot 100 (Billboard)	78
Global 200 (Billboard)	140
Ireland (IRMA)	94
Netherlands (Single Tip)	9
New Zealand Hot Singles (RMNZ)	5
Sweden (Sverigetopplistan)	73
UK Singles (OCC)	90
US Bubbling Under Hot 100 (Billboard)	16
US Rhythmic Airplay (Billboard)	15

== Release history ==
Release dates and formats for "Up at Night"
Region	Date	Format(s)	Label	Ref.
Various	March 30, 2022	Digital download; streaming	Atlantic	
United States	April 12, 2022	Rhythmic contemporary radio	Atlantic	
