= Gavin Turek =

American singer

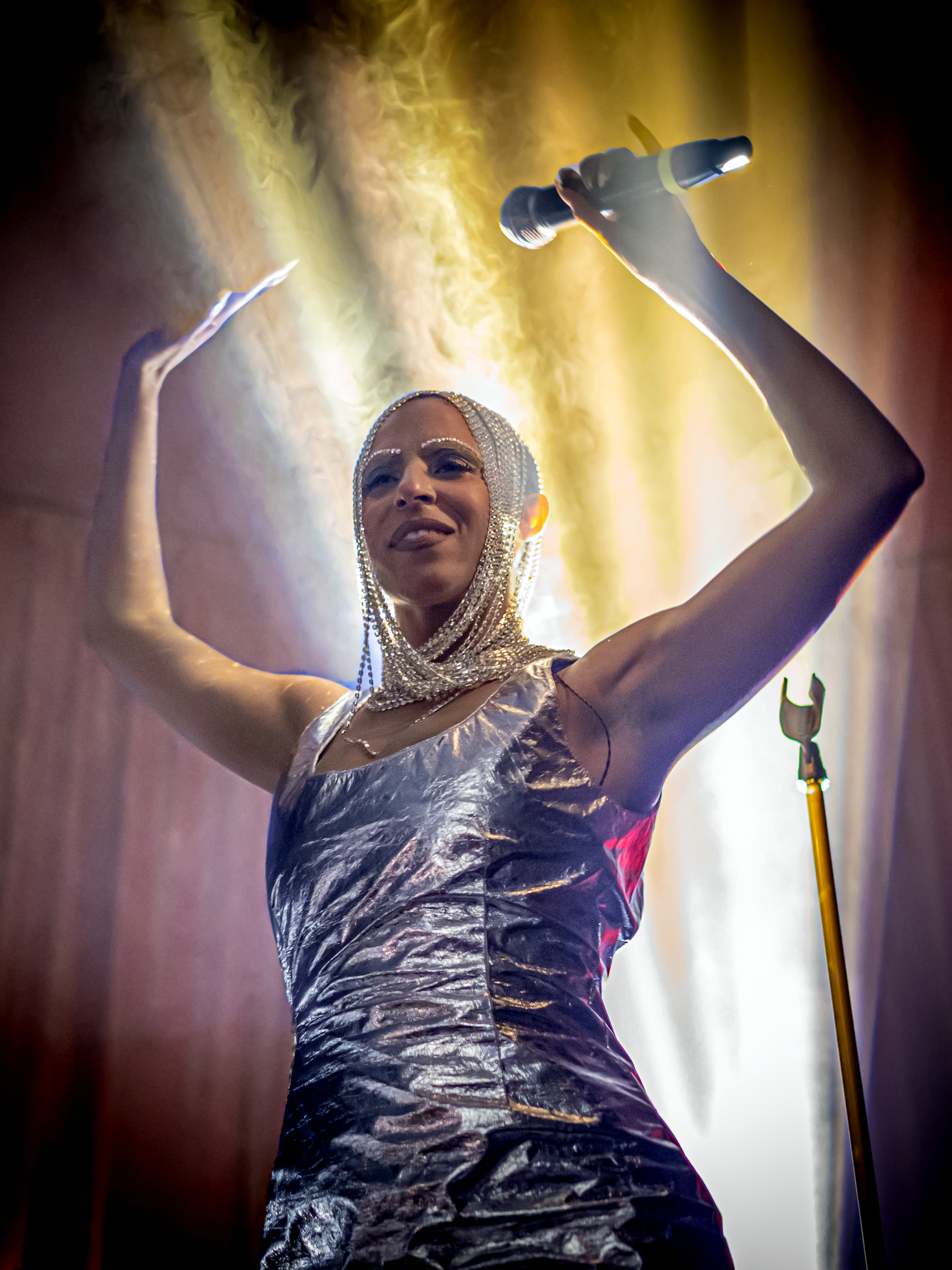
- Born: Los Angeles, California, United States
- Occupations: Singer; songwriter; dancer; model; actress
- Musical career
- Genres: Disco; dance
- Website: gavinturek.com

Gavin Turek is an American singer, songwriter, dancer, and actress from Los Angeles, California.

== Life and career ==
Gavin Turek first started creating her own songs at age six. In 2009, she received her undergraduate degree in art history and Black studies at Scripps College.

In April 2015, she released her single "Frontline", an homage to Donna Summer and the B-side "Don't Fight It" via 1nfinity/Iheartcomix which was remixed by Grammy nominated producer starRo.

In August 2015, she released an extended play with her longtime collaborator and friend Tokimonsta, whom she met years ago via their Myspace music pages. The EP You're Invited is written by Gavin Turek and produced by Tokimonsta, and was released via Young Art Records. Turek is also known for her work with Mayer Hawthorne, most recently as a member of his band Tuxedo. In the summer of 2015, she and Tuxedo toured the East and West Coast with Tokimonsta.

Billboard magazine debuted the Tokimonsta's remix of Gavin Turek's single "Frontline" and announced their upcoming EP, with two songs, "Hemisphere" and "Surrender", being released. Spin Magazine named her top 5 artists to watch for in July 2015. She was called "LA's Disco Queen of the Moment" by Revolt TV, and was "On the Verge of Fame" by LA Weekly. In 2017 she released the EP Good Look for You on her own Madame Gold label. On July 23, 2021, she released her first full-length album named Madame Gold on her label Madame Gold Records.

Turek has performed at iconic venues such as The Troubadour, Hollywood Bowl, Palladium and El Rey.

== Discography ==
Gavin Turek has released two studio albums and three EPs so far.

=== Studio albums ===
| Year | Album details |
|---|---|
| 2021 | Madame Gold: Label: Madame Gold |
| 2024 | Diva of the People: Label: Madame Gold |

=== EPs ===
| Year | EP details |
|---|---|
| 2013 | The Break-Up Tape: Label: TuneCore |
| 2015 | You're Invited: Label: Young Art Records |
| 2017 | Good Look For You: Label: Madame Gold |
| 2025 | Diva Of The People (Remixes): Label: Madame Gold |

=== Singles ===
| Year | Single details |
|---|---|
| 2015 | Frontline/Don't Fight It: Label: Madame Gold |
| 2016 | Surrender (Remixes): Label: Young Art Records |
| 2016 | On The Line (MetaPop Remixes): Label: MetaPop |
| 2024 | Disco Boots: Label: Madame Gold |
| 2024 | IOU: Label: Madame Gold |
| 2024 | Off the Wheel: Label: Madame Gold |
| 2024 | Off the Wheel (Remixes): Label: Madame Gold |
| 2024 | Heaven Knows: Label: Madame Gold |
| 2025 | Disco Boots (Robosonic Remix): Label: Madame Gold |
| 2025 | Outta My Mind (Rimarkable Remix): Label: Madame Gold |
| 2025 | Friend Zone (James Juke's Hot Take): Label: Madame Gold |
