= Few Good Things =

Studio album by Saba
- Released: February 4, 2022
- Studio: Revival Studio LA; Kingsize Soundlabs; 64 Sound
- Genre: Hip-hop; neo soul; jazz rap; trap
- Length: 47:39
- Label: Pivot Gang, LLC
- Producer: Monte Booker; Cheflee; daedaePIVOT; Daoud; Day Wave; Nascent; Jacob Rochester; Saba

Saba chronology
Care for Me (2018)	Few Good Things (2022)	From the Private Collection of Saba and No I.D. (2025)

Singles from Few Good Things
- 1. "Fearmonger" Released: November 4, 2021; 2. "Stop That" Released: November 18, 2021; 3. "Come My Way" Released: January 13, 2022; 4. "Survivor's Guilt" Released: January 27, 2022

Few Good Things is the third studio album by American rapper Saba. It was released through Pivot Gang, LLC on February 4, 2022. The album features guest appearances from Black Thought, G Herbo, Krayzie Bone, 6lack, Smino, Mereba, Fousheé, and Eryn Allen Kane, as well as Pivot Gang. Upon its release, the album was met with critical acclaim for its production and introspective lyrics.

== Background ==
On February 9, 2021, Saba released the eponymous short film directed by C.T. Robert. Saba explained the film in a press release saying:

The concept of Few Good Things is the realization of self after a search for exterior fulfillment. It is the satisfaction and completeness you gain by simply living a life that is yours. Few is a small number, but few is not lonely. In the face of all adversity, a few good things is recognizing and accepting blessings. Few is to count them, one by one. An empty glass is full of air. An empty bank is full of lessons. An empty heart is full of memories. Few good things is to grow comfortable with the empty, and despite that, finding your fullness.

== Promotion and singles ==
Throughout 2020 and 2021, Saba released many promotional singles, including "Ziplock", "Rich Don't Stop", "Mrs. Whoever", "Something in the Water", "So and So", and "Are You Down". On November 4, 2021, Saba announced his-then upcoming third studio album, titled Few Good Things, and released the album's first single, called "Fearmonger". On November 18, he released the album's second single, titled "Stop That". On January 13, 2022, he released the album's third single, "Come My Way" (featuring Krayzie Bone). The album's fourth and final single, "Survivor's Guilt" (featuring G Herbo), was released on January 27.

== Critical reception ==
Professional ratings
Aggregate scores
Source	Rating
Metacritic	83/100
Review scores
Source	Rating
NME	5/5
Consequence	8.3/10
Pitchfork	7.5/10

Upon its release, Few Good Things was met with widespread critical acclaim from music critics. At Metacritic, which assigns a normalized rating out of 100 to reviews from mainstream publications, the album received an average score of 83, based on 6 reviews. Kyann-Sian Williams of NME gave the album 5 out of 5 stars saying "On this record, Saba expertly blends the whimsical and spiritual nature of soul music with GOAT-level penmanship reminiscent of the conscious rap of yesteryear. The result is a glorious neo-rap sound. It doesn't quite fit in with his contemporaries' party music, and he's not always as crafty and traditional as hip-hop, so rappers like Saba often stay on the wayside, delivering absolute perfection without many accolades. That would be a shame, as this is an album at a divine level."

Consequence wrote that "Few Good Things builds on Saba's quest to just live life while acknowledging that's a loaded proposition at times. It's hard telling someone else to pull themselves up by their bootstraps when they don't even have a boot, when there are fewer straps upon which to tug. Saba lives with that feeling every day, doing his best to enjoy the fruits of his labor, help as many as he can, and not get depressed knowing he can't save everyone." Jayson Greene of Pitchfork wrote about the production from Saba, daedaePIVOT, and Daoud saying "As the trio has forged their sound, Saba's flow has softened and turned more melodic. He works best when his voice is another instrument in the mix, freely mixing up registers between melody and rhythm."

== Track listing ==
No.	Title	Producer(s)	Length
1.	"Free Samples" (featuring Cheflee)	Cheflee; Daoud; daedaePIVOT	2:07
2.	"One Way or Every Nigga with a Budget"	Daoud; daedaePIVOT	2:45
3.	"Survivor's Guilt" (featuring G Herbo)	Saba; Daoud; daedaePIVOT	3:42
4.	"An Interlude Called 'Circus'" (featuring Eryn Allen Kane)	Saba; Daoud; daedaePIVOT	1:02
5.	"Fearmonger" (featuring Daoud)	Daoud; daedaePIVOT	3:41
6.	"Come My Way" (featuring Krayzie Bone)	Daoud; daedaePIVOT	3:10
7.	"Still" (featuring 6lack and Smino)	Daoud; daedaePIVOT; Day Wave; Saba	3:45
8.	"A Simpler Time" (featuring Mereba)	Monte Booker; Jacob Rochester; Daoud^{[a]}	3:33
9.	"Soldier" (featuring Pivot Gang)	Saba; Daoud; daedaePIVOT; Phoelix^{[a]}	3:05
10.	"If I Had a Dollar" (featuring Benjamin Earl Turner)	Saba; Daoud; daedaePIVOT	3:13
11.	"Stop That"	Saba; Daoud; daedaePIVOT	2:18
12.	"Make Believe" (featuring Fousheé)	Saba; Daoud; daedaePIVOT	3:41
13.	"2012" (featuring Day Wave)	Daoud; Nascent; Saba^{[a]}; Day Wave^{[a]}	4:20
14.	"Few Good Things" (featuring Black Thought and Eryn Allen Kane)	Daoud; daedaePIVOT; Saba; Cheflee	7:08
Total length:			47:39

Note

- ^{^[a]} signifies an additional producer.

== Personnel ==
Musicians

- Saba – vocals (all tracks), drum programming (tracks 3, 4, 7, 11, 12, 14), electric guitar (4), bass (9)
- Daoud – synthesizers (tracks 1, 3–6, 9–13), keyboards (1–3, 5, 6, 9–14), additional vocals (1, 2, 4, 6, 9, 12–14), acoustic guitar (1, 12, 14), electric guitar (2, 5–7, 9, 12, 13), bass (2, 5–7, 9, 14), percussion (2, 5), piano (7), drum programming (9, 12)
- daedaePIVOT – drum programming (tracks 1–7, 9–11, 14), additional vocals (2, 9), acoustic guitar (2), percussion (5)
- Cheflee – bass, electric guitar (tracks 1, 14); drums (1)
- Brandon Farmer – drums (track 1), additional drums (14)
- Phoelix – additional vocals (tracks 7, 9), bass (9)
- Day Wave – electric guitar (track 7)
- Monte Booker – drum programming, keyboards, synthesizer (track 8)
- Jacob Rochester – drums (track 8)
- Nascent – drum programming (track 13)

Technical

- Joe LaPorta – mastering
- Papi Beatz – mixing
- Saba – engineering (tracks 1–6, 8, 10–14), additional mixing (all tracks)
- Daoud – engineering (tracks 1, 2, 4–6, 9, 12–14), string arrangements (1, 2, 9, 12, 14), additional mixing (all tracks)
- Hope Brush – engineering (tracks 3, 5, 10)
- Rudyard Lee Cullers – engineering (tracks 4, 8–10, 12, 14)
- Josh Berg – engineering (tracks 6, 7)
- 6lack – engineering (track 7)
- Smino – engineering (track 7)
- Jared "JT" Gagarin – engineering (track 7)
- Frsh Waters – engineering (track 9)
- daedaePIVOT – additional mixing

Visuals

- C.T. Robert – creative direction
- Dawit N.M. – photography
- Ruben Rodriguez – graphic design

== Charts ==
Weekly chart performance for Few Good Things
Chart (2022)	Peak position
US Independent Albums (Billboard)	44
