= Searching Sylvan =

Mixtape by QuESt
- Released: September 2, 2014
- Genre: Hip hop
- Length: 72:57
- Label: Visionary Music Group
- Producer: QuESt; Logic; 6ix; Denaun Porter; Kyle Justice; The Marvels; OB; Synematik; Tae Beast; Will Notes; Wishlade

QuESt chronology
Fear Not Failure (2012)	Searching Sylvan (2014)	Far From Familiar (2016)

Singles from Searching Sylvan
- 1. "May 10, 2012" Released: July 21, 2014

Searching Sylvan is a mixtape by Miami rapper Sylvan LaCue, known at the time as QuESt, that was released on September 2, 2014. The mixtape was released under the Visionary Music Group label that QuESt was temporarily a part of.

== Background ==
QuESt states that Searching Sylvan was a tale of his life since May 10, 2012. The mixtape is in a timeline of events, with The Source explaining how Searching Sylvan explains QuESt's relationship difficulties, family issues and all that he has endured. Such events in Searching Sylvan include the murder of QuESt's friend over an iPhone in, the street culture in Miami based on the murderer and other events in QuESt's life.

== Composition ==
The album begins with a cold open, with the first track happening after the final track in the mixtape's timeline, representing QuESt going back to square one. QuESt uses flexible flows throughout the mixtape and his lyrics show his emotions in rhymes about daydreams and real-life issues, such as having a friend becoming paralyzed after being shot.

== Reception ==
Searching Sylvan received unanimous critical acclaim upon its release, praising the compositions, and lyrics of the mixtape. The Huffington Post named QuESt on their 11 Artists You Need To Know For The Rest Of 2014 list, with The Huffington Post stating "QuESt is about to prove himself one of the most promising storytellers in hip-hop" and that Searching Sylvan was not "just one of the best mixtapes or hip-hop releases this year ... [it] is one of the best albums all year". Near the end of 2014, The Huffington Post placed Searching Sylvan #6 on their list of The 15 Most Underrated Albums Of The Year.

The Source says that Searching Sylvan has "incredible production, which is only matched and surpassed by QuESt’s versatile flows". Concerning the content of the mixtape, The Source states that the project is "as high-quality as you can manage" and has "a surprising level of replay value".

== Track list ==
Credits adapted from Sylvan's SoundCloud.

No.	Title	Producer(s)	Length
1.	"Welcome Home Sylvan"	The Marvels	1:03
2.	"Maybe I Should"	Synematik	4:27
3.	"Make It Out Alive"	The Marvels	4:22
4.	"Automatic"	Will Notes; 6ix	5:59
5.	"Biscayne Blvd"	Logic	4:48
6.	"The Ride" (featuring Melat)	Kyle Justice	4:09
7.	"C.O.T. // Dreams Dreams Dreams"	6ix; Sylvan LaCrue	6:32
8.	"Erase Me"	OB	5:45
9.	"Hunger"	6ix	4:40
10.	"TreaZon's Prone to Sin (Interlude)" (featuring TreaZon)	OB	2:46
11.	"Lost Niggas"	6ix	3:04
12.	"No Love in The City"	Logic; Tae Beast	5:01
13.	"Struggle Rapper"	6ix; Wishlade	5:53
14.	"In a Moment (Interlude)" (featuring Melat)	The Marvels	1:28
15.	"Dying Words" (featuring Linzi Jai & Mickey Factz)	Denaun Porter	6:40
16.	"Jon Bellion's One Way to San Diego (Outro)" (featuring Jon Bellion)	The Marvels	2:19
17.	"May 10th, 2012"	6ix	4:01
Total length:			72:57
