= Far From Familiar =

Studio album by Sylvan LaCue
- Released: April 8, 2016
- Recorded: 2015–2016
- Genre: Hip hop
- Length: 53:57
- Label: WiseUp & Co.
- Producer: Linzi Jai; Wishlade; Fortune; Jake and Jonathan Howard

Sylvan LaCue chronology
Searching Sylvan (2014)	Far From Familiar (2016)	Apologies In Advance (2018)

Far From Familiar is a project by American hip hop artist Sylvan LaCue that was released on April 8, 2016. The album was released under WiseUp & Co., Lacue's own label. The album was recorded between early-2015 and 2016.

== Background ==
After having his popularity grow following the release of Searching Sylvan, LaCue stated that being "QuESt" "was becoming too unfamiliar for my own good" and that there were "unfamiliar faces appearing every single day, & I found myself in places I could barely recognize". He then met a woman in Emeryville, California who encouraged him to head back to his hometown of Miami. After returning home and much reflection, LaCue announced on September 9, 2015, exactly one year after the release of Searching Sylvan, that he was changing his stage name to his actual name, Sylvan LaCue, and that his next project would be titled Far From Familiar which would be produced by The Marvels.

== Composition ==
The album is LaCue's story about his encounters between the release of Searching Sylvan and Far From Familiar, with its composition occurring "fluidly and in pieces". It begins with "Loner", a track about LaCue being alone in Los Angeles, eventually breaking away from his QuESt persona and leaving Visionary Music Group. In the second movement of "Crosswinds", LaCue says that it is when he was his "rawest emotionally" and that it was him "letting go of this super hero macho man demeanor". The album concludes with "At What Cost", with LaCue stating, "I chose to close out with this because it's also the title of my next project. Now that I've found that peace, it's really about how bad do I want what I feel I'm destined for".

== Track listing ==
No.	Title	Length
1.	"Loner" (featuring Linzi Jai)	3:49
2.	"Cruel World"	3:47
3.	"Heavenly"	2:51
4.	"Hollywood Identity Crisis (Skit)"	0:39
5.	"Fall from Grace"	4:39
6.	"The Uber (Skit)"	0:23
7.	"Studio City" (featuring Melat)	4:39
8.	"Venus Amor Says L.O.Y.L (Interlude)" (featuring Venus Amor)	1:46
9.	"Emeryville"	4:45
10.	"Caravan 04" (featuring Linzi Jai)	3:54
11.	"Lisa Bonet"	3:46
12.	"Farleys (Interlude)"	2:06
13.	"Back to the City"	5:02
14.	"Crosswinds" (featuring Melat)	5:29
15.	"Give Me the World"	5:45
16.	"At What Cost?"	5:39
Total length:		53:57
