= Sylvan LaCue =

American rapper

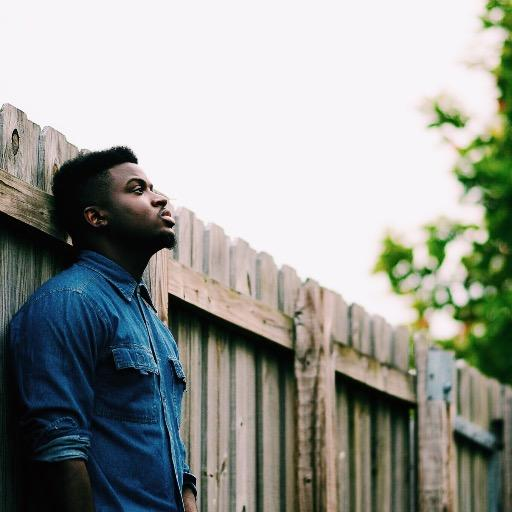

Background information
- Also known as: QuESt (former)
- Born: Sylvan Pierre LaCue; September 2, 1990 (age 35); Miami, Florida, U.S.
- Genres: Hip hop
- Occupation: Rapper
- Years active: 2009–present
- Labels: WiseUp & Co.
- Website: sylvanlacue.com

Sylvan Pierre LaCue (born September 2, 1990), formerly known as QuESt, is an American rapper originating from Miami, Florida. He began his career in 2009 with several releases, including the critically acclaimed Searching Sylvan mixtape. In April 2016, he released his debut album, Far From Familiar, and in January 2018, he released his second album, Apologies in Advance.

He previously signed to Chris Zarou's Visionary Music Group record label (2013–2014) before forming his own collective, WiseUp & Co. In 2016, he signed a distribution deal with INGrooves, his first as an independent artist.

== Career ==
=== 2009–2012: Career beginnings ===
Sylvan LaCue began his music career in 2009 under his then name, QuESt, after taking inspiration from Canadian rapper Drake and his sudden success following the So Far Gone mixtape. He chose the stage name "Quest" but stylized it as "QuESt" after rapper Nas' uppercase "S", saying "Quest is a common name, I wanted to differentiate myself in some way, shape, or form."

After a troubled relationship with his mother, LaCue moved out of his mother's home at the age of 17 and thereafter, repeatedly moved back in and out of her house.

In 2009, he was the champion of Jermaine Dupri's "Survival of the MCs" competition, beating 660 other hip hop performers and earning a deal with Dupri's newly founded TAG Records. However, months after LaCue won his deal with TAG Records, the record company folded. Subsequently, LaCue began releasing content online following the era of the online mixtape circuit, building a solid following under his then name "QuESt".

Into 2011, LaCue was living independently and was working full-time as a janitor. In late 2011, LaCue's father moved in with him after being released from jail and convinced LaCue to allow him to take care of financial responsibilities.

Six months after giving his father responsibility of the finances, LaCue and his father were evicted on May 10, 2012. Following being evicted, losing his job weeks earlier and giving his father his car, LaCue almost decided to quit rapping. He also had doubts of success after not getting recognition despite releasing works, contacting individuals in the music industry and performing independently. He decided to speak with his A&R representative where she told him to take his time and not to do anything.

=== 2013–2014: Visionary Music Group and Searching Sylvan ===
LaCue moved to San Diego, California feeling he needed a "change in scenery" after experiencing his hardships. Deciding to take his time, LaCue decided to tour with rapper Logic on his Welcome To Forever Tour in early 2013. After building a relationship with Visionary Music Group president Chris Zarou, it was announced in August 2013 that LaCue joined Chris Zarou's record label, Visionary Music Group (VMG).

On September 2, 2014, LaCue released the Searching Sylvan mixtape. Following its release, The Huffington Post named LaCue on their 11 Artists You Need To Know For The Rest Of 2014 list, with The Huffington Post stating "[LaCue] is about to prove himself one of the most promising storytellers in hip-hop" and that Searching Sylvan was not "just one of the best mixtapes or hip-hop releases this year ... [it] is one of the best albums all year". Near the end of 2014, The Huffington Post again placed LaCue on a list, placing Searching Sylvan #6 on The 15 Most Underrated Albums Of The Year.

=== 2014–2016: WiseUp Music and Far From Familiar ===
In December 2014, LaCue announced that he had decided to leave Visionary Music Group due to differences with the management, stating that there was "no ill will towards them". Weeks after separating from his previous label, LaCue created the WiseUp music collective. He returned to Florida to reconnect with friends and family, speaking on an industry panel in the spring before heading to Orlando to prepare his next body of work.

In June 2015, Miami New Times listed LaCue as one of 5 Miami Artists You Should Know, stating that "he's been taking Miami by storm since 2009. It's 2015 now, and he's still going strong."

On September 2, 2015, LaCue released a statement on his website which announced how he has dropped QuESt as his stage name and will go by his birth name. The statement was accompanied by a featured journal on VSCO which detailed what he had gone through in the past year, such as finding himself as an artist.

There was this one time, me & my engineer went to this coffee shop we became super fond of. There was this barista I knew that was working that afternoon. We played a new record and she loved it. She always knew my name was "QuESt", but never heard any of my previous work besides that song. I remember paying for my cup of coffee, and my real name popped up from the card scan: Sylvan LaCue. She said, "This is your real name?... This fits you a hell of a lot better than QuESt, just saying." Ironically, I guess I was Searching Sylvan all along...

LaCue also announced that he would be dropping a project titled Far From Familiar. The album is a direct sequel to "Searching Sylvan" and is produced by WiseUp's in-house production team, The Marvels. In November 2015, he released The Watcher 3 to herald his return and offer an unapologetic and observant report on the current state of the industry. A little over week, Studio City appeared. Both were received well by fans and blogs alike.

On December 15, 2015, LaCue announced the EP Evangeline, which was scheduled to be released for free, on December 18, 2015. The EP is a "love story" according to LaCue, that takes place after the events of his upcoming project, Far From Familiar.

In anticipation of the new project, LaCue released Fall From Grace, the first official single on February 4, 2016, via Complex Magazine. The song was originally titled So Help Me God before being renamed the night before in response to Kanye's indecisiveness over his album title. LaCue revealed the inspiration behind the song on his Twitter following its release.

I wrote "Fall From Grace" at the lowest time of my life last year....That song is all about asking God to save me from myself. Imagine feeling invincible & knowing you're doing all the wrong things & thinking all the wrong thoughts. That's what "Fall From Grace" is.

Far From Familiar was released on April 8, 2016.

=== 2016–present: Tours, Apologies in Advance and Florida Man ===
In an article released the day before the release of Far From Familiar, LaCue explained his ambitions in an interview with The Fader. He explained that the final track of Far From Familiar, "At What Cost?", was him finally obtaining peace with himself, stating, "I chose to close out with this because it's also the title of my next project". LaCue also said that he was focused on expanding his brand, WiseUp & Co., and that he planned to go on tour in 2016. Following the release of At What Cost by fellow rapper GoldLink, LaCue announced that he had abandoned the idea, and on May 8, 2017, announced the album would be titled Apologies in Advance, via Twitter. From March 3 to April 4, 2017, LaCue toured with Saba on his Bucket List Tour, in an effort to support Saba's Bucket List Project.

Apologies in Advance was released on January 12, 2018.

LaCue began teasing upcoming music in early July 2018 on Twitter, eventually releasing Florida Man on Monday, July 9, the title track to a mixtape that released on July 13, 2018. LaCue dedicated the project to his late grandmother, with a goal of inspiring unity within his city, as his grandmother did for his family.

He explained in an interview with DJBooth:

When I started asking questions, that's when I realized what her legacy was about. She had three daughters; all the men in their lives abandoned them. She said, "No matter what, I'm gonna keep my daughters together. I'm gonna dedicate my life to keeping my family together." I didn't get to say goodbye to her, and that was my peace. I'm gonna start with this, this is the first place that I could think of that I could keep together.

== Artistry ==
You can hear how hungry QuESt is to succeed in every verse. There's no throwaway lines, no bar wasted. It's as if he sees every bass kick and high-hat as another chance to give the listener a piece of his story. Where a lot of artists are making club bangers that feel empty and contrived, QuESt's songs feel like they come from a place of true inspiration and meaning, where every line is substantial in its own way.

— HotNewHipHop

In a Rehab Magazine article, the author notes LaCue's ability of storytelling calling his lyrics "unapologetic and true to his narrative". In the article, Sylvan also explains how he matured as an artist after suffering from a "Drake effect", hoping he could make sudden success with his music.

He explained:

Had I gotten any monetary success early on I wouldn't have known what to do with it and I would've sabotaged myself as an artist. I'm grateful that God really allowed me to fail the amount of times I failed so I could learn.

The storytelling and narratives have been compared to Kendrick Lamar's debut Good Kid, M.A.A.D City and classics from Masta Ace and Prince Paul.

HotNewHipHop describes LaCue as having a similar voice and inflection as Smoke DZA, though having a "consistently faster" flow. They say his lyrics are flexible, switching his rhyming style to the beat of the music.

His delivery is described as "very aggressive and brash, but not in a barking or yelling sense". He also sings, contributing vocals on many of his own hooks.

LaCue has been known to give fans an intimate look into his thought process, producing VSCO journals and meeting with fans in various cities to preview new music over conversation and coffee.

=== Influences ===
LaCue stated at a young age he heard the Nas song "You're Da Man" off of Stillmatic and "just connected to it". He also says that he was a fan of Big Pun, Canibus, Lupe Fiasco, Common, Jay-Z, Kanye West, Coldplay, Red Hot Chili Peppers and R. Kelly. Previous influences included Childish Gambino and his Camp album, as well as Kendrick Lamar.

However, while recording Apologies in Advance, he cut out all rap, choosing to listen to artists like Michael Jackson, Coldplay, James Blake, Sade and The Hics instead

== Personal life ==
In April 2024, LaCue announced that he had been diagnosed with lung cancer.

== Discography ==
=== Studio albums ===
- Far From Familiar (2016)
- Apologies in Advance (2018)

=== Mixtapes ===
- Mind on Blast Vol. 1 (2008)
- Mind on Blast Vol. 2 (2008)
- Where's My Rhymebook? (2008)
- The Reinforcements (2009)
- Distant Travels Into Soul Theory (2009)
- Broken Headphones (2009)
- How Thoughtful (2010)
- The Reason: A Defense Mechanism (2011)
- Fear Not Failure (2012)
- Searching Sylvan (2014)
- Florida Man (2018)
- No More Apologies DEMOS (2020)

=== EPs ===
- Evangeline EP (2015)
- Young Sylvan EP. 1 (2021)
- Young Sylvan EP. 2 (2021)
- Young Sylvan EP. 3 (2021)

== Awards and nominations ==
In March 2015, LaCue was nominated to be on the XXL annual Top 10 Freshmen list, which features artists to watch out for and that are on the rise which are shown on the cover of the "Freshman Class" issue of XXL.
