= Kari Faux =

American rapper (born 1992)

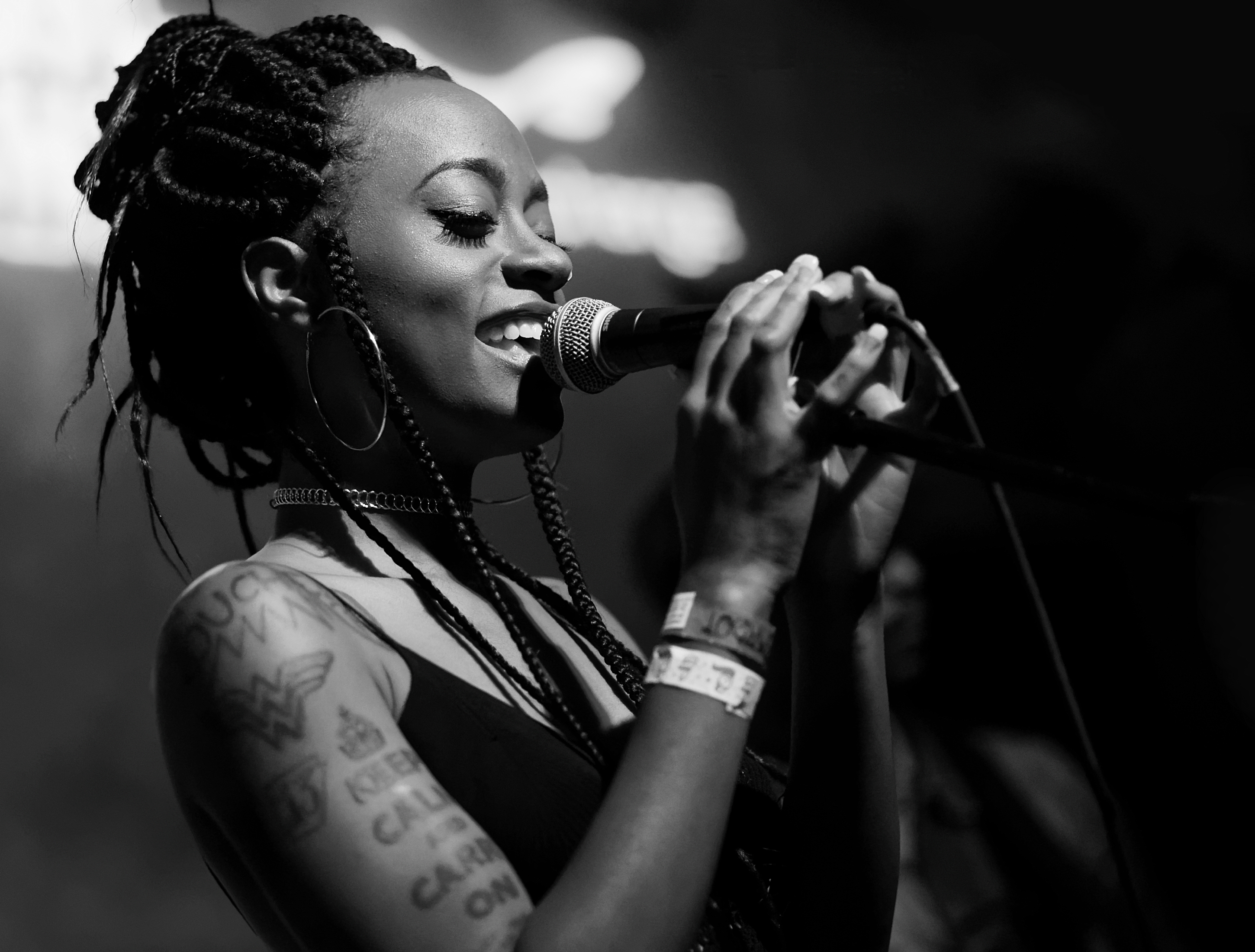
- Faux performing in 2016

Background information
- Born: Kari Rose Johnson; June 11, 1992 (age 34)
- Origin: Little Rock, Arkansas, U.S.
- Genres: Hip hop; R&B; pop
- Occupations: Rapper; singer; songwriter; record producer

Kari Rose Johnson (born June 11, 1992) better known by her stage name Kari Faux, is an American rapper from Little Rock, Arkansas. She is best known for her flamboyant dress, and conversational style of rap. Her songs are most commonly characterized as "internet rap" with repetitive hooks, minimal production, and an emphasis on clever wordplay.

== Early life and education ==
Faux was born June 11, 1992, to a single teenage mother. She was adopted by a couple that had a 10-year-old son, and raised in Little Rock, Arkansas. Her father worked for the Skippy Peanut Butter factory in Little Rock, and her mother was a minister.

She attended Little Rock Central High School. After graduating she moved to Atlanta, Georgia and enrolled in the Art Institute of Atlanta, to study audio engineering, but dropped out after a while, declaring: "It sucked. The school is a scam, and I only had one real friend. That was just a bad time. I was so sad. I was smoking a lot of weed, trying to find myself, it was not working, so I took my ass back home.”

== Career ==
In 2014, Faux released her debut mixtape, Laugh Now, Die Later, which had been received somewhat well from critics, landing a spot on Pitchfork's "Most Overlooked Mixtapes of 2014. The EP would most notably gain the attention of rapper Donald Glover, also known as Childish Gambino. Glover remixed Faux's "No Small Talk," and featured it on his own mixtape, STN MTN. Kari was also featured on Glover's 2016 album, "Awaken, My Love!" She released the EP Cry 4 Help in 2019 and the mixtape Lowkey Superstar in 2020. Lowkey Superstar was recorded in London, United Kingdom, with producer Danio.

== Personal life ==
In the fall of 2014 Faux moved to Los Angeles, California with friend and collaborator bLAck PARty, in order to further develop her career and produce more music, but went back to Little Rock in 2016. As of 2020, Faux resides again in Los Angeles.

== Discography ==
=== Studio albums ===
- Lost En Los Angeles (2016)
- Lowkey Superstar (Deluxe) (2021, Don Giovanni/Lowkey Superstar)
- Real B*tches Don't Die! (2023)

=== EPs ===
- Primary (2017)
- Cry 4 Help (2019)

=== Mixtapes ===
- City Limits (2012)
- Sophisticated Rachetness (2012)
- No Sleep Til Atlanta (2013)
- Laugh Now, Die Later (2014)
- Lowkey Superstar (2020)

=== Guest appearances ===
List of non-single guest appearances, with other performing artists, showing year released and album name
Title	Year	Artist(s)	Album
"No Small Talk"	2014	Childish Gambino	STN MTN
"Bday"	2016	Isaiah Rashad, Deacon Blues	The Sun's Tirade
"Zombies"	2016	Childish Gambino	"Awaken, My Love!"
"Alotta Women / Useless"	2017	Matt Martians	The Drum Chord Theory
"Fake"	2018	Chloe x Halle	The Kids Are Alright
"On My Mind / Charge It to the Game"	2018	Patrick Paige II, Syd	Letters of Irrelevance
"Mortal Kombat"	2019	Pivot Gang	You Can't Sit with Us
"Bucciarati"	2020	Open Mike Eagle	Anime, Trauma and Divorce
"Don't Call Again"	2020	Tkay Maidza	Last Year Was Weird (Vol. 2)
"Off the Plane"	2022	Pink Siifu, EZ	Real Bad Flights
