= Lune Rouge (album) =

Studio album by Tokimonsta
- Released: October 6, 2017
- Genre: Electronic
- Length: 38:59
- Label: Young Art Records
- Producer: Tokimonsta

Tokimonsta chronology
Fovere (2016)	Lune Rouge (2017)	Oasis Nocturno (2020)

Lune Rouge is the third studio album by American producer Tokimonsta. It was released on October 6, 2017, via Young Art Records. Produced by Tokimonsta, it features vocals of artists such as MNDR, Selah Sue, and Isaiah Rashad. In December 2018, the album was nominated for Best Dance/Electronic Album at the 61st Annual Grammy Awards.

== Singles ==
The album consists of five singles released in the span of five months between June and October 2017. The first single "Don't Call Me" was released on June 16, 2017. The second and third singles, "We Love" and "Bibimbap", were released on August 4 and 18 respectively. "No Way", the fourth single, was released on September 8, 2017. The album's fifth and final single was released on October 6, 2017, titled "I Wish I Could".

== Background ==
At the end of 2015, Tokimonsta was diagnosed with a rare and potentially fatal brain disease known as moyamoya. Having undergone two brain surgeries, she was left unable to speak. After taking a break from music production, her memory returned and she began production and writing for the album.

On April 6, 2018, the album's remix edition, titled Lune Rouge Remixed, was released via Young Art. Felix Cartal, Hugo Massien, Qrion, Sofi Tukker, Alexander Lewis, Kingdom and Dâm-Funk are among the featured artists included on the album. Tokimonsta told New York Daily News regarding the album "It represents who I am right now as an artist, how I've progressed over the many years that have passed since the last one."

== Critical reception ==
Professional ratings
Review scores
Source	Rating
Pitchfork	6.8/10
PopMatters	9/10 stars
The Music	4/5 stars

Pitchfork described Lune Rouge as having "a pleasantly everyday quality" and converting Tokimonsta's initial musical style into "streamlined pop compositions". Giving the album a 6.8 out of 10 rating, the website also noted her lack of effort in reflecting her recent struggles into the album's sound. PopMatters reviewed the album as "an ambitious assembly of every disparate tool... and a resounding success," rating it with 9 stars out of 10.

== Track listing ==
No.	Title	Length
1.	"Lune"	3:02
2.	"Rouge"	2:13
3.	"Thief" (featuring Saints)	3:10
4.	"I Wish I Could" (featuring Selah Sue)	4:26
5.	"We Love" (featuring MNDR)	3:26
6.	"Bibimbap"	3:22
7.	"No Way" (featuring Isaiah Rashad, Joey Purp and Ambré Perkins)	3:24
8.	"Don't Call Me" (featuring Yuna)	3:37
9.	"Rose's Thorn"	4:24
10.	"Early to Dawn" (featuring Selah Sue)	3:38
11.	"Estrange" (featuring Io Echo)	4:17
Total length:		38:59

Lune Rouge Remixed
No.	Title	Length
1.	"Thief" (featuring Saints) (Penthouse Penthouse Remix)	4:53
2.	"Don't Call Me" (featuring Yuna) (Alexander Lewis Remix)	3:18
3.	"We Love" (featuring MNDR) (Felix Cartal Remix)	3:10
4.	"I Wish I Could" (featuring Selah Sue) (Sofi Tukker Remix)	3:49
5.	"Don't Call Me" (featuring Yuna) (DâM-FunK Re-Freak)	3:56
6.	"No Way" (featuring Isaiah Rashad, Joey Purp & Ambré) (Kingdom Remix)	3:10
7.	"Bibimbap" (Holly Remix)	5:07
8.	"I Wish I Could" (featuring Selah Sue) (Ouri Remix)	4:51
9.	"Don't Call Me" (featuring Yuna) (Hugo Massien Remix)	5:04
10.	"No Way" (featuring Isaiah Rashad, Joey Purp & Ambré) (Sam von Horn & Justin Jay Remix)	4:29
11.	"We Love" (featuring MNDR) (Qrion Remix)	3:42
12.	"Early to Dawn" (featuring Selah Sue (Plastic Plates Remix))	5:37
Total length:		51:06

== Personnel ==
- James Bautista – layout
- Shawn Hatfield – mastering
- Lewis Kunstler – executive production
- Jennifer "Tokimonsta" Lee – mixing, production
- Max Prentis – artwork
