= Femdot =

American rapper

femdot.
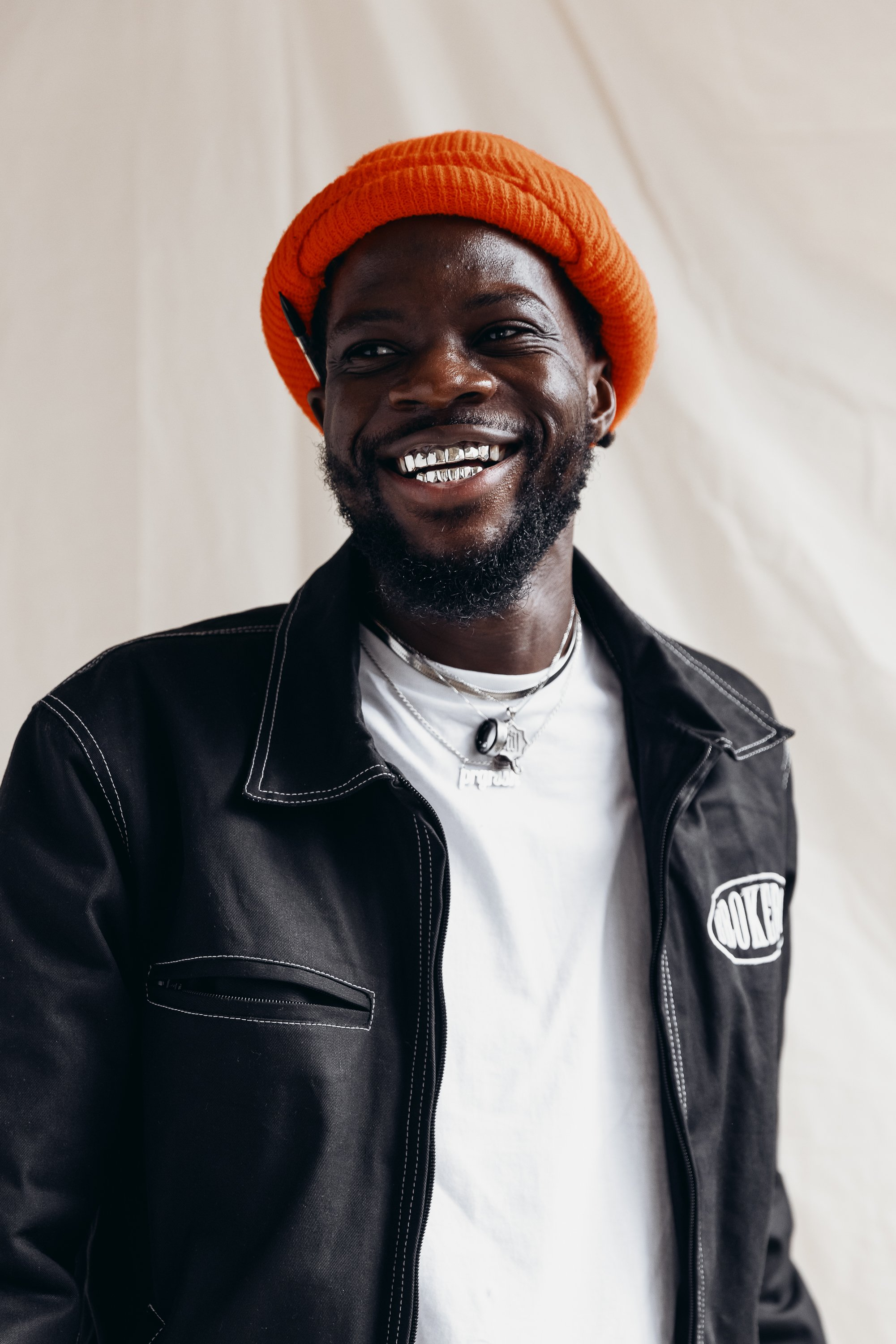
- Adigun in 2021

Background information
- Also known as: femdot., femdilla, King Dilla, femdelacreme
- Born: Mueen Olufemi Adigun; Evanston, Illinois
- Origin: Chicago, Illinois
- Genre: Hip-hop
- Years active: 2016–present

Femi Adigun, known professionally as Femdot (stylized as femdot.) is a Nigerian-American rapper from Chicago. In 2019, Adigun dropped his second studio album, 94 Camry Music, which quickly rose in popularity, and embarked on his first official tour with Tobi Lou. Since then, Adigun has amassed over 365,000 monthly listeners on Spotify, and has collaborated with multiple Chicago musicians.

== Early life and education ==
Adigun was born in Evanston, Illinois and was raised in Rogers Park. He started rapping when he was 6 years old in his basement with his brother and his brother's friends. He states that his brother was an inspiration for him to start rapping, and got his name "femdot" from him too. Adigun is inspired by the other artists like Jay-Z, A Tribe Called Quest, Twista and Jodeci which he listened to growing up. When Adigun was 12, he would record mixtapes and sell them at his school. When he was 16 he dropped a mixtape called A Tribe Called Fresh and started to gain traction on Twitter.

Adigun went to Pennsylvania State University in 2014, and graduated DePaul University in 2018 during his musical career, and earned a degree in Biological Sciences and a minor in Peace, Justice & Conflict Studies. During this time he was performing at other events making it challenging for him to handle both rapping and school.

== Career ==
Following the release of his debut studio album Delacreme 2 in 2018, he was the opening performer at Lollapalooza 2018, his first appearance at the festival. In the album he talks about hard subjects like insecurity, systemic oppression, and mental health. Lyrical Lemonade produced the music video for his track "0'Something" in October 2018, which helped him gain even more traction. In 2019, he released his album 94 Camry Music which was inspired by a 1994 Toyota Camry he used to drive. In 2020, Adigun released a pair of new songs under the banner Buy One, Get One Free Vol. 1. This single includes "Lifetime", which features Saba, as well as "Back Home".

Adigun stopped rapping during the COVID-19 pandemic to help out his community instead. After slowly getting on Zoom calls to rap, he began to rap in a studio again in the summer of 2020. In 2021, he released Not for Sale and started performing at live performances. In 2019, Adigun established Delacreme Scholars, a non-profit focused on giving out scholarships and running toy and food drives.

He began teaching the "Chicago Culture Through Hip Hop" course at DePaul University in the fall 2025 semester. Students enrolled in the class will listen to albums, read supplemental texts and discuss the music in context. Adigun wants to take the students around Chicago neighborhoods to see where artists came up with their ideas for music.

== Personal life ==
Adigun is the younger brother of two-time Olympian Dr. Seun Adigun and a graduate of Homewood Flossmoor High School.

=== Political views ===
Adigun denounced operations conducted in Chicago in the fall of 2025 by Immigration and Customs Enforcement, describing it as "domestic terrorism."

== Discography ==
=== Studio albums ===
List of studio albums
Title	Release date
Delacreme 2	June 6, 2018
94 Camry Music	October 1, 2019
Not for Sale	November 9, 2021
Free Samples, Vol. 1	June 6, 2023
Free Samples, Vol. 3	February 25, 2025

=== Extended plays ===
List of extended plays
Title	Release date
King Dilla	December 7, 2014
Femdot on Audiotree Live	October 1, 2020
Free Samples, Vol. 2	September 26, 2023
Buy One, Get One Free, Vol 3.	August 6, 2024
Buy One, Get One Free, Vol 4.	August 27, 2024
Red Dot.	July 31, 2025
King Dilla 2	September 30, 2025
Less Talk, More Haze	February 24, 2026

=== Singles ===
List of singles
Title	Year	Album
"Body Bags"	2016	Non-album single
"Immortal"	2016	Non-album single
"Happyoctober"	2017	Non-album single
"Alright"	2018	Delacreme 2
"Ryu"	2018	Delacreme 2
"Happy December"	2018	Non-album single
"Kronos Freestyle"	2019	Non-album single
"Quid Pro Quo"	2019	94 Camry Music
"Whole Thang"	2019	King Dilla
"Coming Up"	2019	Non-album single
"Consignment"	2019	94 Camry Music
"Chi's Interlude II"	2019	Non-album single
"Dilla Back"	2019	Non-album single
"94 Camry Music"	2019	94 Camry Music
"Die In A Flashback"	2020	Non-album single
"Buy One, Get One Free Vol 1."	2020	Non-album single
"Buy One, Get One Free Vol 2."	2021	Non-album single
"Bussin"	2021	Non-album single
"Bussin - A Colors Show"	2021	Non-album single
"Mount Olympus"	2022	Non-album single
"Carefree"	2022	Non-album single
"The Tour Pack"	2022	Non-album single
"Senegalese"	2022	Non-album single
"Questions"	2023	Non-album single
"Pelle Pelle"	2023	Free Samples, Vol. 1
"Falling Out Of Love"	2023	Non-album single
"Bobby Portis"	2023	Free Samples, Vol. 1
"Collect Calls"	2023	Some People Scream, Some People Talk by Wakai
"Are U Kidding" (with ARDN)	2023	Non-album single
"Watch Me"	2023	Non-album single
"Sunroof Handstand"	2023	Coffee Grounds by theMind, and Vooo
"Cowboy Bepop"	2023	Free Samples, Vol. 2
"Missy Elliot"	2023	Non-album single
"Go Gentle"	2023	Non-album single
"Chosen"	2023	The Uptown Blues (Deluxe) by Marko Stat$
"Freedom Demo"	2023	Non-album single
"Where U At?" (with Young Saab, Grip, and Galxara)	2024	Non-album single
"Only Kings" (with Hittz)	2024	Non-album single
"High Kick" (with Mynameisntjmack and Mick Jenkins)	2024	Mynameisnt by Mynameisntjmack
"Pour Me Up" (with KingTrey)	2024	Non-album single
"Wassup with you"	2024	Buy One, Get One Free, vol 3.
"Bishop Ford II"	2024	Buy One, Get One Free, vol 4.
"Lowdown" (with Julianna Townsend)	2024	Lowdown by Julianna Townsend
"Kenmore & Broadway"	2025	Free Samples, Vol. 3
"Back in the Lead"	2025	Free Samples, Vol. 3
"AGNB/Deserved pt2" (with KingTrey, and Mick Jenkins)	2025	Non-album single
"Pour Me Up Extended" (with KingTrey)	2025	Non-album single
"Aim-Hi" (with Oblé Reed)	2025	Non-album single
"Giant Leaps" (with Recoechi)	2025	Flavaz by Recoechi
"Switch Hitter" (with Kamae)	2025	Chicago Sessions Vol. 22025 by Kamae
"red dot."	2025	Non-album single
"RAPSTAR"	2025	Non-album single
"bring me dat" (with FEMI ISHOLA)	2025	Non-album single
