= Cry 4 Help =

EP by Kari Faux
- Released: March 8, 2019
- Label: Change Minds

Kari Faux chronology
Primary (2017)	Cry 4 Help (2019)

Singles from Cry 4 Help
- 1. "Leave Me Alone" Released: February 22, 2019

Professional ratings
Review scores
Source	Rating
HipHopDX	3.3/5
Pitchfork	7.4/10
RapReviews	7/10
Spectrum Culture	4/5 stars

Cry 4 Help is the second extended play by American rapper Kari Faux, released on March 8, 2019 via Change Minds.

== Track listing ==
No.	Title	Length
1.	"Medicated"	3:40
2.	"Leave Me Alone"	3:07
3.	"In the Air" (featuring Curren$y)	4:21
4.	"Night Time"	3:31
5.	"Latch Key"	2:34
