= Tokimonsta =

American record producer and DJ (born 1987)

TOKiMONSTA
- Born: Jennifer Lee; January 26, 1987 (age 39); Torrance, California, U.S.
- Genres: Instrumental hip-hop; electronica
- Occupations: Record producer; DJ
- Years active: 2008–present
- Labels: Ultra; Brainfeeder; Ramp; Young Art
- Website: www.tokimonsta.com

Jennifer Lee (born January 26, 1987), known professionally as Tokimonsta (stylized as TOKiMONSTA), is an American record producer and DJ based in Los Angeles. She has collaborated with artists such as Anderson .Paak, EarthGang, Isaiah Rashad, Selah Sue, and ZHU. Additionally, she has published a number of official remixes, a few being Beck, Duran Duran, Olafur Arnalds, Disclosure, Sia, the Squid Game theme, and Odesza.

In 2019, TOKiMONSTA was nominated for "Best Dance / Electronic Album" at the Grammy Awards for her album Lune Rouge. She was the first female Asian-American producer to receive a nomination in this category.

== Early life ==
Lee grew up in Torrance, California. She is second generation Korean American. She was raised by her mother who ran a small business to support their family. As a young child, her mother tasked her with classical piano lessons. Lee has noted disliking lessons as a child, though she appreciates the structural foundation it created for her approach to composing and producing.

She graduated from University of California, Irvine. While studying, she first began producing music, using the Fruity Loops Studio digital audio workstation (DAW). She later progressed to producing using the Ableton Suite as her primary DAW. She participated in beat cyphers and battles at Leimert Park's Project Blowed and Low End Theory. Upon graduating, she worked for a video game publisher while continuing to make music and perform as a hobby. She would later be laid off due the US economic recession, and would decide to pursue music full time.

== Career ==
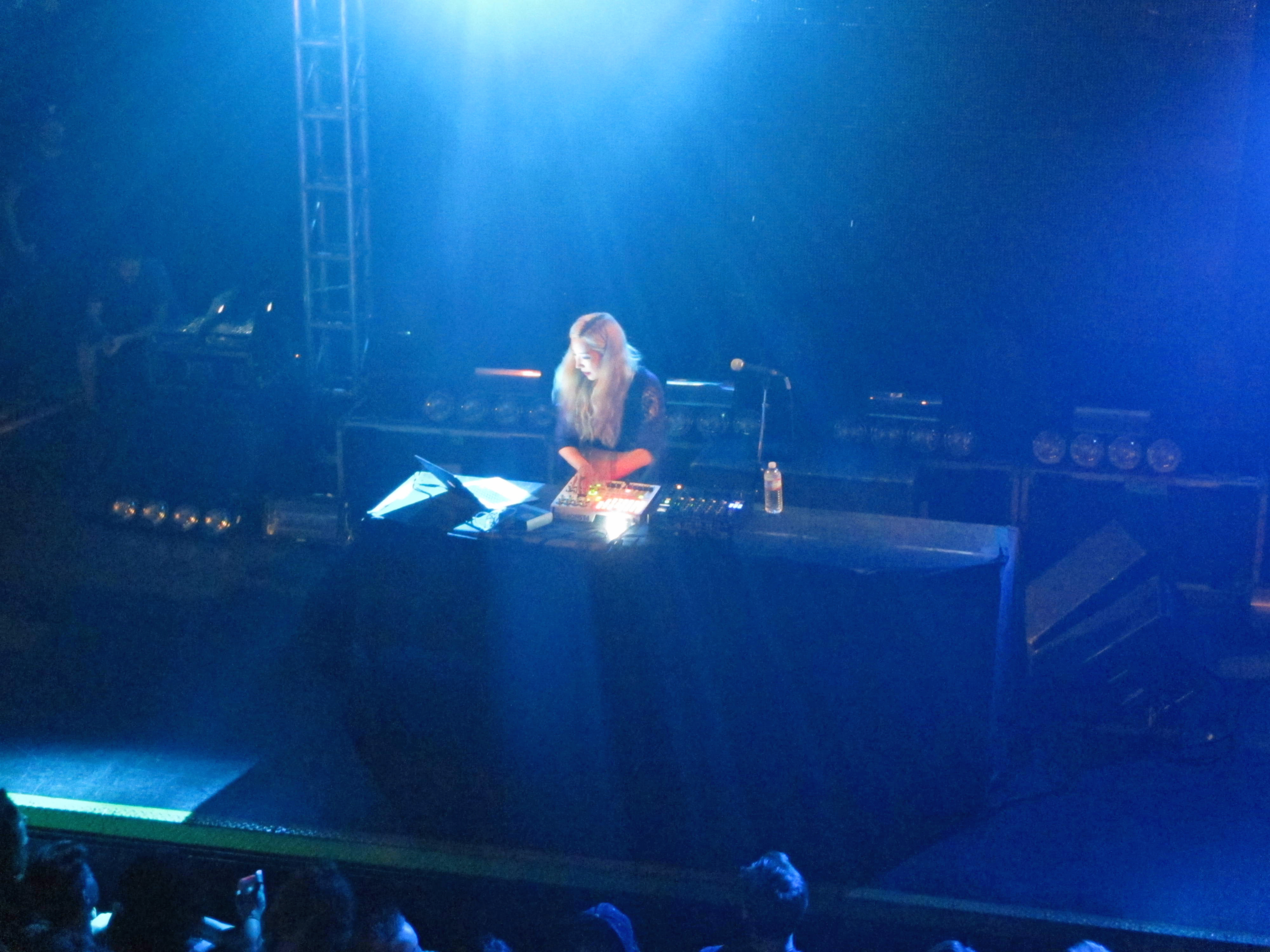
Tokimonsta performing at Metro Chicago in 2013.

Lee was invited to attend the Red Bull Music Academy in London in 2010. She was the first woman to sign to Flying Lotus's Brainfeeder label and released her first album, Midnight Menu, in November 2010 on Brainfeeder. She was rated the number one Hottest Los Angeles Lady DJ by LA Weekly in December 2010. She released the EP Creature Dreams, also on Brainfeeder, in 2011. The next year, she released Boom, an 11-track collaborative project with Suzi Analogue as Analogue Monsta.

In 2013, her second album, Half Shadows, was released on Ultra Records. In 2014, she released Desiderium on her own Young Art Records. She returned to the Red Bull Music Academy that same year as an alumni lecturer. She produced Gavin Turek's You're Invited in 2015 on Young Art Records. On September 9, 2015, she announced on Twitter the release of her solo album Fovere and she will be out on tour in support of her new album starting November 9, 2015.

Lee was profiled in the 2020 documentary film Underplayed, in which she elaborated on the issue of diversity in the electronic dance music industry.

=== Name ===
The name TOKiMONSTA was originally a screen name for Lee. It combines the Korean word for rabbit (tokki), which she took from a Korean's children's song "San Toki", with a colloquial spelling of the word "monster." In an interview with Tonya Mosley, Lee said that "I can't take it back 'cause this has been my name now for many years," but also suggested that the juxtaposition of "tokki" as something cute and "monsta" as something scary "shows very much in the music that I make. There are moments where my music is very quiet, and then I have [...] moments where my music is loud or beautiful and disturbing or light or heavy. And now, more than ever, I do feel like I identify with my name, and I'm proud to have it be a part of my life."

== Personal life ==
Lee was diagnosed with Moyamoya disease in late 2015. After undergoing two brain surgeries, she briefly lost language and comprehension skills. Once these were regained to a degree, Lee eventually began work on her 2017 album Lune Rouge, despite not being able to fully understand music while recovering. She has noted that this album was her most personal piece of work due to the difficulties she experienced prior to making it.

She discusses surmounting these challenges in Vox's Netflix series, Explained (season 1, episode titled "Music") and the Great Big Story miniseries Soundwave.

== Discography ==
=== Albums ===
- Midnight Menu (2010)
- Half Shadows (2013)
- Desiderium (2014)
- Fovere (2016)
- Lune Rouge (2017)
- Oasis Nocturno (2020)
- Eternal Reverie (2025)

=== Extended plays ===
- Bedtime Lullabies (2008)
- Cosmic Intoxication (2010)
- Creature Dreams (2011)
- Los Angeles 8/10 (2011) (with Mike Gao)
- Boom (2012) (with Suzi Analogue, as Analogue Monsta)
- You're Invited (2015) (with Gavin Turek)
- Come And Go Remixed (2020)
- Get Me Some Remixed (2020)

=== Singles ===
- "USD / Free Dem" (2010) (with Blue Daisy)
- "Mileena's Theme" (2011) (for Mortal Kombat)
- "Darkest (Dim)" (2012) (with Gavin Turek)
- "Go With It" (2013) (with MNDR)
- "The Force" (2013) (with Kool Keith)
- "The World Is Ours" (2014)
- "Realla" (2014) (with Anderson Paak)
- "Steal My Attention" (2014)
- "Drive" (2014) (with Arama)
- "Pinching" (2014) (with Iza Lach)
- "Saw Sydney (Pharrell 'That Girl' Flip)" (2015)
- "Hemisphere" (2015) (with Gavin Turek)
- "Surrender" (2015) (with Gavin Turek)
- "Put It Down" (2015) (with Anderson .Paak)
- "Don't Call Me" (2017) (feat. Yuna)
- "We Love" (2017) (featuring MNDR)
- "I Wish I Could" (2018) (featuring Selah Sue)
- "Strange Foot" (2019) (featuring Ambré)
- "Dream Chorus" (2019)
- "Love That Never" (2019)
- "Fried For the Night" (2020) (featuring EarthGang)
- "One Day" (2020) (featuring Bibi and Jean Deaux)

=== Remixes ===
- Shlohmo – "Hot Boxing the Cockpit" (2010)
- Suzi Analogue – "NXT MSG" (2010)
- Eight and a Half – "Scissors" (2011)
- Take – "Horizontal Figuration" (2011)
- Andreya Triana – "Far Closer" (2011)
- Swede:Art – "I'm a R.O.B.O.T." (2011)
- Daedelus – "Tailor-Made" (2011)
- Kidkanevil – "Megajoy" (2011)
- Hundred Waters – "Thistle" (2012)
- Jodeci – "Freek'n You" (2012)
- Stan Getz & João Gilberto – "Corcovado" (2013)
- Felix Cartal – "New Scene" (2013)
- Justin Timberlake – "Suit & Tie" (2013)
- Tinashe – "2 On" (2014)
- Elizabeth Rose – "Sensibility" (2014)
- Kilo Kish – "IOU" (2014)
- Jessie Ware – "Keep On Lying" (2014)
- Mariah Carey – "Heartbreaker" (2014) (with Io Echo)
- Lupe Fiasco – "Superstar" (2014)
- Yacht – "Where Does This Disco?" (2015)
- The Drums – "There's Nothing Left" (2015)
- Gavin Turek – "Frontline" (2015)
- Lil Uzi Vert – "Team Rocket" (2016)
- Beck – "Wow" (2016)
- Maroon 5 & Cardi B – "Girls Like You" (2018)
- George FitzGerald and Lil Silva – "Rollback" (2018)
- Odesza – "Falls" (2018)
- Olafur Arnalds – "They Sink" (2019)
