= Rose Windross =

British singer-songwriter

Rose Windross is a British reggae and R&B singer. She was a vocalist for the group Soul II Soul, known for writing as well as singing lead vocals on their first single "Fairplay", which charted at number 63 on the UK Singles Chart. The BBC said the song "reset the tone for urban music." The Irish Independent said the song "introduced the sound of black Britishness to the world". In 1999, she launched W Records with her brother Norris.

== Biography ==
Windross was born in South London. Windross began as a singer and songwriter in the UK reggae scene. She recorded her first album, Just Rose, on the Ital Records label when she was still at school.

In 1987, she sang an original song on stage at club night at the Africa Centre, which led to her becoming a vocalist with the group Soul II Soul collective. Although Soul II Soul had existed since 1982, Windross's song, "Fairplay" was their first commercial single. In the book Sounds Like London, Lloyd Bradley explained "Virgin A&R man and Africa Centre regular Mick Clarke was so impressed when its huge bassline and Rose Windross vocals boomed out of the Funki Dred's sound system that he signed them to a three-singles-and-one-album deal." The song, written by Windross, and with Windross on lead vocals, charted at number 63 on the UK Singles Chart. A bigger hit came with Keep on Movin' on which Windross sang vocals.

In 1991, Windross released "Living Life Your Own Way" on Acid Jazz Records, with "Love in the Making" on the B side. The song had originally been rumoured to be coming out on Jazzie B's Funky Dredd Records and even Raw Rass Records. At this time, in her day job, Windross managed a shop. Later that year, she was in the studio with producer Barry K Sharpe working on another single.

In 1996, Windross performed vocals on DPD's cover version of Terence Trent D'Arby's "Sign Your Name".

Windross joined her brother Norris Windross in 1999 to launch W Records, through his own booking agency, Da Boss Entertainments.

In 2010, Soul II Soul reunited for their reunion tour with Windross in the lineup. In 2022, Kehlani's Up at Night played homage to "Fairplay".

== Critical reception ==
Of "Fairplay", Soul II Soul's first hit, written and performed by Windross, the BBC said it "reset the tone for urban music." The Irish Independent said the song "introduced the sound of black Britishness to the world".

Of the song "Keep on Movin", the Boston Globe said it was "a gifted soprano with a piercing range and elegant air. Rose Windross instills more of a mid-range quality while Do'Reen retains a gritty low-down growl and a provocative vibrato. A startling debut."

Of the album "Keep on Movin", Louisville's Courier-Journal wrote "the most potent weapons in the Soul II Soul arsenal are a trio of gifted young female vocalists. Caron Wheeler moans and lilts... Rose Windross' voice is huskier and stiffer but better suited for fast-paced material... Then there's Do'Reen... Her quivering, sexy vocals earmark "Happiness".
