= Care for Me =

Studio album by Saba
- Released: April 5, 2018
- Genres: Hip-hop, jazz rap
- Length: 41:35
- Labels: Saba Pivot, LLC
- Producers: daedaePIVOT (also exec.); Daoud (also exec.); Saba (also exec.)

Saba chronology
| Bucket List Project (2016) | Care for Me (2018) | Few Good Things (2022) |

Singles from Care for Me
- 1. "Busy" Released: February 26, 2018; 2. "Life" Released: March 20, 2018

Care for Me (stylized as CARE FOR ME) is the second studio album by American rapper Saba. It was released on April 5, 2018, by Saba Pivot, LLC., has received critical acclaim from music critics and audiences alike. The album was produced entirely by daedaePIVOT, Daoud and Saba. The album also includes guest appearances from Chance the Rapper, Kaina and theMIND.

== Background ==
In February 2017, Saba's cousin and fellow Pivot Gang member, Walter E. "John Walt" Long was stabbed to death in Chicago. In an interview, Saba spoke about the mental process and how writing the songs on the album were therapeutic saying:

Care For Me is the first time I delve into talking about depression and anxiety, and then all of these factors as to why I am the way I am. A lot of it had to do with losing my best friend and older cousin, [John] Walt, which is throughout the album. I think why Care For Me is so important is because it talks about mental health in a lot of ways that are simple but I just haven't heard it done in hip-hop music that way.

== Music and lyrics ==
Care for Me is a concept album dedicated to the memory of his late-cousin, which Saba started working on in December 2017. The penultimate track "Prom / King" recounts a story of being set up a blind prom date by Walt, who saves him from the potential embarrassment of public loneliness. The blind date is a success and the pair head to an afterparty. The festive mood suddenly turns dangerous when the date's brother arrives and threatens to stab him. The track was initially planned to be the outro of the album however Saba felt the song was too depressing and didn't want to leave listeners with that feeling. Towards near completion of the album, Saba recalled a moment to review his progress saying: "I was listening with one of the producers and he actually pointed it out: 'Damn dude, all of these songs are about Walt,' I didn't even realize."

== Critical reception ==
Professional ratings
Aggregate scores
| Source | Rating |
|---|---|
| AnyDecentMusic? | 8.2/10 |
| Metacritic | 93/100 |
Review scores
| Source | Rating |
| AllMusic | 4.5/5 stars |
| The A.V. Club | B+ |
| Consequence of Sound | A− |
| Exclaim! | 8/10 |
| HipHopDX | 4.4/5 |
| Pitchfork | 8.7/10 |
| PopMatters | 9/10 |
| Under the Radar | 6.5/10 |
| Tom Hull – on the Web | B+ |
| Vice (Expert Witness) | A− |

Care for Me was met with widespread critical acclaim from music critics. At Metacritic, which assigns a normalized rating out of 100 to reviews from mainstream publications, the album received an average score of 93, based on 5 reviews, indicating "universal acclaim". In his review for AllMusic, Fred Thomas described the album as a "masterful artistic statement" with "Beautifully minimal production [that] supports the feeling of emptiness" Writing for HipHopDX, Justin Ivey stated "With Care for Me, Saba accomplished his objective by making an album that can endure for years to come. His higher aspirations won't afford him the visibility of the rappers acting out for attention, but projects like Care for Me should put him into the discussions of his generation's best hip-hop artists." Sheldon Pearce of Pitchfork gave the album a rave review, awarding it Best New Music, saying "The grief-stricken Chicago rapper’s latest is a marvel of craft, musicality, and emotion. Through Saba's inner turmoil, he finds his most powerful and diaristic storytelling." Wren Graves of Consequence of Sound wrote "At 10 breezy tracks, Care for Me isn't just a collection of songs; it’s an honest-to-god album that develops ideas at its own pace."

=== Accolades ===
| Publication | Accolade | Rank |
|---|---|---|
| The A.V. Club | The A.V. Club's 20 best albums of 2018 | 3 |
| Billboard | The 50 Best Albums of 2018 | 32 |
| Chicago Tribune | The Best rock and rap albums of 2018 | 5 |
| Complex | The Best Albums of 2018 | 15 |
| Consequence of Sound | The 23 Best Albums of 2018 | 3 |
| NPR Music | The 50 Best Albums of 2018 | 26 |
| Okayplayer | The Best Albums of 2018 | 15 |
| PopMatters | The Best Albums of 2018 | 15 |
| Rolling Stone | The 200 Greatest Hip-Hop Albums of All Time | 184 |
| Spin | The 51 Best Albums of 2018 | 37 |
| Uproxx | The 50 Best Albums of 2018 | 12 |

== Track listing ==
| No. | Title | Length |
|---|---|---|
| 1. | "Busy / Sirens" (featuring theMIND) | 5:29 |
| 2. | "Broken Girls" | 4:37 |
| 3. | "Life" | 2:42 |
| 4. | "Calligraphy" | 3:04 |
| 5. | "Fighter" (featuring Kaina) | 4:42 |
| 6. | "Smile" | 3:28 |
| 7. | "Logout" (featuring Chance the Rapper) | 2:30 |
| 8. | "Grey" | 4:00 |
| 9. | "Prom / King" | 7:31 |
| 10. | "Heaven All Around Me" | 3:32 |
| Total length: | | 41:35 |

Notes

- All track titles are stylized in upper case letters, e.g. "BUSY / SIRENS".
- "Prom / King" features uncredited vocals by John Walt

== Personnel ==
Credits are adapted from the rapper's official SoundCloud and Genius pages.

Vocalists

- Tahj Malik Chandler – vocals
- theMIND – vocals (1)
- Kaina – vocals (5)
- Chance the Rapper – vocals (7)

Musicians

- Saba – additional drums (6)
- daedaePIVOT – additional drums (10)
- Daoud – keyboards (7)
- Satya Jimenez – violin (1, 4, 6, 7)
- Herbie One – trumpet (4, 7, 8, 9, 10)
- Nick Phelps – additional drums (2)
- Brandon Farmer – additional drums (7, 8, 9)
- Andre Mateo – guitar (2, 10)
- Cheflee – bass (4, 7)
- SeanZy – additional vocals (5, 6)
- Emanuel Townsend – acoustic guitar (6)
- Huntly Morrison – guitar (7)

Technical

- Saba – production (1–10), executive producer
- Daoud – production (1–10), executive producer
- daedaePIVOT – production (1–10), executive producer
- Matt Wheeler – mixing (1, 6, 7, 8, 10)
- Alex "Papi Beatz" Baez – mixing (2, 3, 4, 5, 9)
