= Bucket List Project =

Studio album by Saba
- Released: October 27, 2016
- Studio: Red Bull Studios, Santa Monica
- Genre: Hip-hop, jazz rap, conscious rap
- Length: 49:32
- Label: Saba Pivot, LLC
- Producer: Saba (also exec.); Phoelix (also exec.); Cam O'bi; Cory Grindberg; D. Phelps; daedaePIVOT; Daoud; Flex Lennon; Joseph Chilliams; Ken Ross; L Boog; Monte Booker; squeakPIVOT

Saba chronology
SpareChange! (2015)	Bucket List Project (2016)	Care for Me (2018)

Bucket List Project is the debut studio album by American rapper Saba. It was released on October 27, 2016, by Saba Pivot, LLC.

== Background ==
The album was produced mainly by Saba himself and Phoelix, with guest producers ranging from Cam O'bi, daedaePIVOT, Joseph Chilliams, Ken Ross, Flex Lennon, squeakPIVOT, among others. The album also includes guest appearances from Noname, Twista, Smino, Ravyn Lenae, and Jean Deaux, among others.

== Critical reception ==
Professional ratings
Review scores
Source	Rating
Consequence of Sound	4/5 stars
Exclaim!	3.5/5 stars
HipHopDX	4/5 stars
Pitchfork	7.0/10
The Irish Times	4/5 stars
Tom Hull – on the Web	B+

Bucket List Project received critical acclaim from critics. Pitchfork wrote "it is superbly written and performed. Saba is a crafty storyteller who makes full use of his long memory and slithering wordplay." Finishing 12th on Rolling Stone's list of 40 Best Rap Albums of 2016, Saba "successfully mashes of-the-moment hip-hop and atmospheric, live-band funk textures." Consequence of Sound compared Bucket List Project to Kendrick Lamar, writing "Saba maintained a precocious mastery of his craft with windingly poetic flows over murky, subdued beats, not too far removed from Kendrick Lamar circa Section 80."

== Track listing ==
All tracks are written by Tahj Malik Chandler.

No.	Title	Producer(s)	Length
1.	"In Loving Memory"	Phoelix; Saba; Daoud^{[a]}; L Boog^{[a]}	1:57
2.	"Stoney" (featuring Phoelix and BJRKNC)	Phoelix; Saba	3:32
3.	"GPS" (featuring Twista)	Cam O'bi	3:48
4.	"Church (Liquor Store)" (featuring Noname)	Cam O'bi	4:05
5.	"Westside Bound 3" (featuring Joseph Chilliams)	Joseph Chilliams; daedaePIVOT; Saba^{[a]}	2:58
6.	"MOST"	Saba; Phoelix^{[a]}	3:34
7.	"Symmetry"	Ken Ross; Phoelix^{[a]}; daedaePIVOT^{[a]}	4:33
8.	"Photosynthesis" (featuring Jean Deaux)	Phoelix; Saba	3:23
9.	"The Billy Williams Story"	Flex Lennon; squeakPIVOT	3:54
10.	"Bucket List" (featuring Matthew Santos)	daedaePIVOT; Cory Grindberg	3:36
11.	"American Hypnosis" (featuring Akenya)	Phoelix; Saba; D. Phelps^{[a]}; Daoud^{[a]}	4:14
12.	"California / Outro" (featuring Ravyn Lenae and Phoelix)	Monte Booker; Phoelix; Daoud^{[a]} / Phoelix; Saba	6:25
13.	"World in My Hands" (featuring Smino and LEGIT)	Saba; Phoelix; daedaePIVOT	3:52

Track notes

- ^{^[a]} signifies an additional producer
- "In Loving Memory" and "American Hypnosis" features additional vocals from Daoud.
- "Stoney" features additional vocals from BRJKNC.
- "GPS" features uncredited vocals from Chandlar and BJRKNC.
- "Church (Liquor Store)" features additional vocals from Akenya.
- "Symmetry" and "Photosynthesis" features additional vocals from Phoelix.

== Personnel ==
Credits are adapted from the rapper's official SoundCloud page.

Vocalists

- Saba - primary artist
- Phoelix - featured artist (2, 12), background artist (7, 8)
- BJRKNC - featured artist (2), background artist (3)
- Twista - featured artist (3)
- Noname - featured artist (4)
- Joseph Chilliams - featured artist (5)
- Jean Deaux - featured artist (8)
- Matthew Santos - featured artist (10)
- Akenya - featured artist (11), background artist (3)
- Ravyn Lenae - featured artist (12)
- Smino - featured artist (13)
- LEGIT - featured artist (13)
- Daoud - background artist (1, 11)
- Chandlar - background artist (3)

Musicians

- Herbie One - trumpet (1, 11, 12)
- Simon Dufor - sax (2)
- Benjamin J Shepherd - additional bass (4)
- Jameson Brenner - guitar (8)

Technical

- Matt Wheeler - mixing, mastering (1, 3, 4, 5, 6, 7, 8, 9, 10, 11, 13)
- Elton "L10" Chueng - mixing (2, 12)
- Matt Wheeler - mastering (2, 12)
- James Musshorn - recording (2, 4, 6, 10, 12)
- Cornell "MixedbyCJ" Smith - recording (3)
- Elton "L10" Chueng - vocal engineer (4)
- Cameron Boswell - vocal engineer (10)

Production

- Phoelix - production (1, 2, 6, 7, 8, 11, 12, 13)
- Saba - production (1, 2, 5, 6, 8, 11, 12, 13)
- Daoud - production (1, 11, 12)
- L Boog - production (1)
- Cam O'bi - production (3, 4)
- Joseph Chilliams - production (5)
- daedaePIVOT - production (5, 7, 10, 13)
- Ken Ross - production (7)
- Flex Lennon - production (9)
- squeakPIVOT - production (9)
- Cory Grindberg - production (10)
- D. Phelps - production (11)
- Monte Booker - production (12)
