= Jean Deaux =

American musician (born 1995)

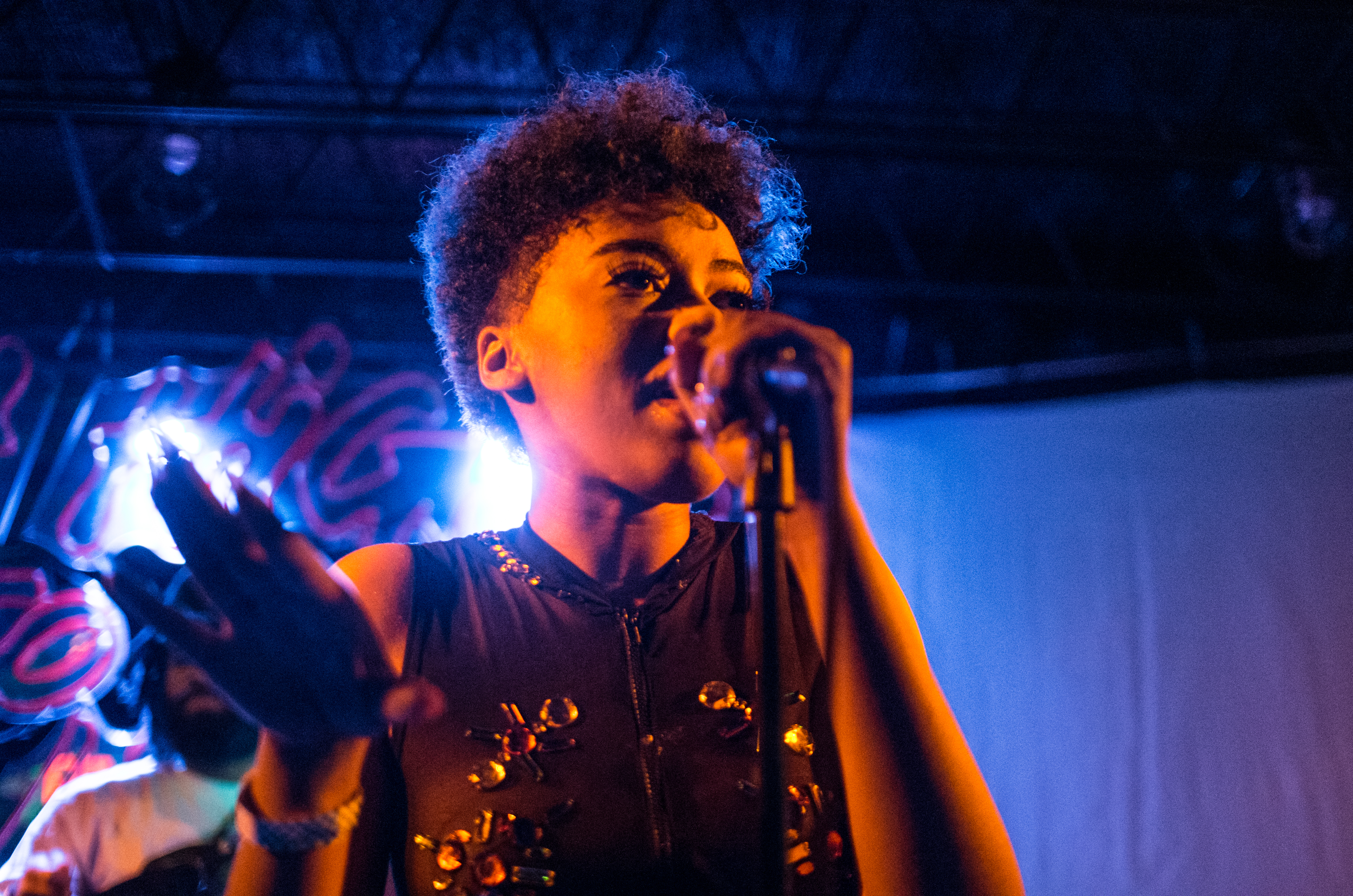
- Performing at 7th St Entry in 2019

Background information
- Born: Zoi Harris; May 4, 1995 (age 31); Chicago, Illinois, U.S.
- Occupations: Singer, songwriter, rapper
- Years active: 2012–present
- Labels: Duality Records; EMPIRE

Zoi Harris (born May 4, 1995), better known by her stage name Jean Deaux (/ʒɑːn doʊ/), is an American musician. She is known for her involvement in multiple genres and creative mediums. Her debut EP Krash was released in October 19, 2018.

== Career ==
Deaux has appeared on tracks by other artists including Smino, Saba, Mick Jenkins, and Isaiah Rashad. She has noted Missy Elliott as one of her inspirations. Jean Deaux is a stage name inspired by the line "that's John Doe" in a track by Rick Ross which she previously used as a Twitter handle before adopting it as a stage name. She is part of the hip hop collective The Village 777 with Alex Wiley, Monster Mike, Isaiah Rashad, Spiff, and The Magician. She is also part of the musical collective Medicine Woman with Ravyn Lenae, Drea Smith, and Via Rosa.

In 2017 she released a track titled "Wikipedia", telling HotNewHipHop that "People are going to try and tell you who you are every step of the way, they'll even knock you down to convince you. But you get stronger every time you get up on your feet". The lead single "Way Out" from the Krash EP was positively reviewed by Pitchfork. The EP received positive reviews from Rolling Out, DJBooth and Chicago Reader. NPR listed Deaux as one of 20 "artists to watch" in 2019.

== Discography ==
=== Extended plays ===
Title	Details
Krash	Released: October 19, 2018; Label: EMPIRE; Format: Digital download, streaming
Empathy	Released: June 14, 2019; Label: EMPIRE; Format: Digital download, streaming
Watch This!	Released: May 4, 2020; Label: EMPIRE; Format: Digital download, streaming
Most Wanted	Released: November 19, 2021; Label: Duality Records, EMPIRE; Format: Digital download, streaming
Heavy	Released: April 14, 2023; Label: Duality Records, EMPIRE; Format: Digital download, streaming
Nowhere, Fast	Released: April 12, 2024; Label: Guin Records; Format: Digital download, streaming

=== Singles ===
==== As lead artist ====
List of singles as lead artist, with showing year released and album name
Title	Year	Album
"Wikipedia"	2017	Wikipedia
"Energy"	2018	Krash
"Back 2 You"	2018	Krash
"Roll With Me"	2023	Nowhere, Fast

=== Guest appearances ===
List of non-single guest appearances, with other performing artists, showing year released and album name
Title	Year	Other artist(s)	Album
"Est. N19g4"	2012	Saba	GETCOMFORTable
"Noah and The Reign"	2013	Mick Jenkins	Trees & Truths
"Menthol"	2014	Isaiah Rashad	Cilvia Demo
"Healer"	2014	Mick Jenkins	The Water[s]
"Kajun"	2016	Smino, Phoelix	Non-album single
"Lemon Pon Goose"	2016	Smino	Non-album single
"Loner"	2016	Mykki Blanco	Mykki
"Photosynthesis"	2016	Saba	Bucket List Project
"Amphetamine"	2017	Smino, Bari, Noname	blkswn
"Taranphoeno"	2018	Phoelix, Smino	TEMPO
"Edward Scissorhands"	2019	Pivot Gang	You Can't Sit with Us
"One Day"	2020	Tokimonsta, Bibi Bourelly	Oasis Nocturno
"On One"	2023	ZZ Ward	Dirty Shine
"WAR CRY"	2025	Baker Boy	Djandjay
