= Pivot Gang =

American hip hop group

- Origin: Chicago, Illinois, United States
- Genre: Hip hop
- Years active: 2011–present
- Members: Saba; Joseph Chilliams; Frsh Waters; MFnMelo; daedaePIVOT; Dam Dam; Daoud
- Past members: dinnerwithjohn (deceased); squeakPIVOT (deceased)
- Website: pivotgang.co

Pivot Gang is a hip hop collective of independent rappers based out the west side of Chicago. The group originated from the Austin neighborhood in 2011. The four founders consist of brothers Saba and Joseph Chilliams , their cousin John Walt (Walter Long),Frsh Waters, and their high school friend MFnMelo.

== History ==
Saba is the most well-known rapper in the group, and is known as the first to debut solo music out of Pivot Gang. Most of the music made by the group has a diverse sound, ranging from smooth soulful samples to more aggressive, rapid drill beats. MFnMelo explains in an interview with the Chicagoist, "a lot of the Pivot shit has that smooth kind of chord tradition that's influenced by New York soul, but it will just go harder. I'll put some drill drums over it. Some of my music has that same creative process, but a lot of it goes into a soulful, hip-hop-y route". The group has released a mixtape titled JIMMY on October 15, 2013.

Their debut album You Can't Sit with Us was released on April 19, 2019, with guest appearances from Smino, Kari Faux, Mick Jenkins, Jean Deaux, Femdot, Sylvan LaCue and Benjamin Earl Turner.

On August 17, 2021, the group announced the passing of Squeak, who was fatally shot in Austin while visiting his grandmother.

The group released the single "Location" in October 2026.

== Members ==
- Saba
- Joseph Chilliams
- MFn Melo
- Dam Dam
- Frsh Waters
- daedaePIVOT
- Daoud
- John Walt (deceased)
- squeakPIVOT (deceased)

== Discography ==
=== Studio albums ===
Title	Album details
You Can't Sit with Us	Released: April 19, 2019; Format: Digital download

=== Mixtapes ===
Title	Album details
JIMMY	Released: October 15, 2013; Format: Digital download

=== EPs ===
Title	Album details
Two Piece Tour Pack	Released: August 5, 2019; Format: Digital download
