= Saba (rapper) =

American rapper and record producer (born 1994)

SABA
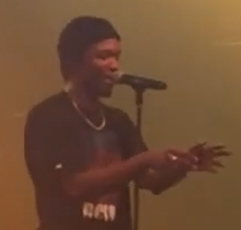
- Chandler performing in 2019

Background information
- Born: Tahj Malik Chandler; July 17, 1994 (age 32); Chicago, Illinois, U.S.
- Genre: Hip-hop
- Occupations: Rapper; singer; songwriter; record producer
- Instruments: Vocals; piano; drums
- Years active: 2012–present
- Label: Saba Pivot, LLC
- Member of: Ghetto Sage; Pivot Gang
- Website: sabapivot.com

Tahj Malik Chandler (born July 17, 1994), better known by his stage name Saba, is an American rapper, singer, and record producer. He grew up in the Austin neighborhood of the West Side of Chicago. He is a co-founder of the musical collective Pivot Gang with his brother Jerrel Chandler (Joseph Chilliams), their late cousin Walter Long Jr (John Walt), their high school friend Logan Yutters (MFn Melo), Jevunte Wheeler (squeakPivot), and Jimmy (Frsh Waters). He is also one third of the supergroup Ghetto Sage, with Smino and Noname.

SABA initially gained recognition after releasing two independent mixtapes: GETCOMFORTable (2012) and ComfortZone (2014). He was also featured on Chance the Rapper's mixtape Acid Rap, in the song "Everybody's Something". In 2015, Saba and Chance the Rapper collaborated on the song "Angels". The duo performed the song live on The Late Show with Stephen Colbert, on October 26, 2015. He released his debut album Bucket List Project on October 27, 2016, and his second album Care for Me on April 5, 2018, to widespread critical acclaim. Saba's third album, Few Good Things released February 4, 2022.

== Early life ==
Saba began playing piano at age 7, which led to experimentation with beat making software. He began high school at 12 and graduated at 16 with a 3.5 GPA. He attended St. Joseph's in the suburban Chicago village, Westchester. Saba would hand out mixtapes in his high school hallways to get his name out. At age 16, Saba began performing at YouMedia Center and Young Chicago Authors (YCA) in the Wicker Park neighborhood of Chicago. These after school open mics gave Saba the confidence and charisma he portrays on stages today. He attended Columbia College Chicago but dropped out after three semesters after his scholarship was dropped.

== Music career ==
=== 2012–2014: GETCOMFORTable and ComfortZone ===
In December 2012, Saba shared his first project, GETCOMFORTable. The album is a "catalogue of young Chicago talents who join Saba in trying to make sense of themselves as rising adults in today’s world." The most popular song off of GETCOMFORTable was "Heaux" featuring well-known Chicago rapper, Mick Jenkins.

In 2013, Chance the Rapper and Saba joined forces on Chance the Rapper's album Acid Rap. Saba's verse in the song "Everybody's Something" increased his popularity. Saba continued rapping in 2013 and began to create his second mixtape, ComfortZone. The mixtape was released in July 2014. Saba used the album as a window into his life, produced the majority of the tracks on the project. He describes his surrounding and his optimistic attitude in his verses. The most popular song off ComfortZone was "Burnout" featuring Eryn Allen Kane.

=== 2015–2017: Bucket List Project ===
Saba contributed to Chance the Rapper and Donnie Trumpet and the Social Experiment's debut studio album, Surf, by making a guest feature on its 10th song, "SmthnThtIWant". The album was released in May 2015 for free on iTunes. Saba released an instrumental EP called SpareChange! in 2015. The EP consists of 8 tracks available through SoundCloud. Toward the end of 2015 as well, Saba featured on Chance the Rapper's single "Angels". Chance the Rapper and Saba performed the song "Angels" on The Late Show with Stephen Colbert on Monday, October 26, 2015. Saba's popularity skyrocketed from his Stephen Colbert performance. The duo represented Chicago's radio stations, with sweatshirts reading "107.5 WGCI" and "Power 92.3" for the performance.

In January 2016, Saba released the single "GPS" featuring his father and musical influence, Chandlar. The single was included in his debut album, Bucket List Project, released on October 27, 2016. The album consists of 13 tracks featuring a wide array of other Chicago-based artists such as Noname, Twista, Akenya, Jean Deaux, and his brother Joseph Chilliams. The album focuses on his upbringing on the West Side and spirituality. In July 2016, Saba also appeared on Noname's debut album, Telefone, on the song "Shadow Man" alongside Phoelix and Smino.

In 2017, Saba released singles titled "Monday to Monday", "There You Go", and "Where Ideas Sing", however, had not announced a subsequent project for these songs. "Where Ideas Sing" was released on September 28, 2017. Shortly after, September 29, Artwork for the song was featured in downtown Chicago near Apple's new Apple Store on Michigan Avenue. The artwork was to promote both hometown artists Saba and Matthew Hoffman, who created the visual representation of Saba's lyrics.

In late 2017, after the death of cousin and fellow Pivot Gang member John Walt, Saba and Walt's mother Nachelle started the John Walt Foundation in his memory.

=== 2018–2020: CARE FOR ME ===
On February 27, 2018, Saba released the track "BUSY", shortly after announcing a tour for his second album Care for Me. He released CARE FOR ME on April 5, 2018, with tracks featuring Chance the Rapper, Kaina, and theMIND. Put together by producers daedaePIVOT, Daoud, and Saba himself, the album is dedicated to his late cousin and close friend Walter Long Jr. aka John Walt; who was fatally stabbed due to a situation on the train in Chicago in February 2017. Walter is heavily mentioned in the songs: "BUSY", "LIFE", and "PROM/KING". the latter recounts the events that Saba and Walter shared with each other leading up to Walter's death.

Saba was named one of 10 "Chicagoans of the Year" by the Chicago Tribune on December 27, 2018, for his music and his contributions to the John Walt Foundation, a foundation named in Walter Long's memory launched by Saba and Long's mother in 2017 to "foster the arts for Chicago youth".

Saba and the other members of Pivot Gang released their debut album, You Can't Sit with Us on April 19, 2019.

=== 2021–2024: Few Good Things ===
On May 21, 2021, Saba featured on the Audrey Nuna single "Top Again" off the album A Liquid Breakfast, along with making an appearance in the associated music video.

On November 4, 2021, Saba announced his third album Few Good Things and released the first single titled "Fearmonger". On November 18, he released the second single titled "Stop That". On January 13, 2022, he released the third single "Come My Way" featuring Krayzie Bone. The fourth single "Survivor's Guilt" featuring G Herbo was released on January 27. The album was released on February 4, 2022, including guest appearances from Black Thought, G Herbo, Krayzie Bone, 6lack, Smino, Mereba, Fousheé, Eryn Allen Kane, Cheflee, Benjamin Earl Turner and Pivot Gang.

Saba's song "Stop That" was put into the soundtrack of MLB The Show 23.

He was also apart of the lineup for the 22nd Coachella Valley Music and Arts Festival in April 2023.

=== 2025–present: From The Private Collection of Saba & No I.D. and C0FFEE! ===
On March 7, 2025, Saba announced his collaborative album with producer No I.D. after having released multiple singles together which would soon go on to be featured on "From The Private Collection of Saba & No I.D.". The album was released on March 18, 2025 featuring artists such as MFnMelo, Raphael Saadiq, Kelly Rowland, and BJ The Chicago Kid. In June 2025, he appeared as himself in the episode "Will the Real Natalie Please Stand Up?" of the Marvel TV miniseries Ironheart, where he performed his song "Fearmonger".

On October 27, 2025, Saba announced his mixtape named C0FFEE. The mixtape was released on October 30, 2025, just three days after the announcement, featuring artists such as Ogi, Senate and Felix.

== Artistry ==
=== Influences ===
Saba was influenced by his father, a Chicago R&B artist named Chandlar, at a young age. Chandlar would bring Saba to the studio with him to record sounds of soul, R&B and jazz.

Saba credits fellow Midwest musicians Lupe Fiasco, Bone Thugs-n-Harmony, and Kanye West as his biggest influence. Bone Thugs-n-Harmony got Saba into rap and made him want to write raps himself.

Saba was also influenced by his family members, most notably his older brother and late cousin. His brother is a rapper who goes by the stage name Joseph Chilliams and his cousin was a rapper who went by John Walt. Together, Saba's family and friends, are the backbone of the rap crew Pivot Gang. Pivot Gang is named after the famous scene in Friends where Ross, Rachel, and Chandler move a couch up the stairs and Ross continuously yells, "pivot." To the rap crew it means "to take things one step at a time and to always progress."

== Discography ==
=== Studio albums ===
- Bucket List Project (2016)
- Care for Me (2018)
- Few Good Things (2022)

=== Collaborative albums ===
- From the Private Collection of Saba and No I.D. (with No I.D.) (2025)

=== Mixtapes ===
- ComfortZone
- C0FFEE (2025)

=== With Pivot Gang ===
- You Can't Sit with Us (2019)

== Tours ==
Headlining

- ComfortZone Live (2015)
- Bucket List Tour (2017)
- Care for Me Tour (2018)
- Care for Me Tour Aus/Asia (2018)
- Care for Me Tour Europe (2019)
- You Can't Sit with Us Tour (2019)
- Back Home – A Tour by Saba (2022)
- The Big Picture Tour USA (2025)
- The Big Picture Tour Europe (2026)

Supporting

- Mick Jenkins and Kirk Knight (Mick Jenkins & Kirk Knight) (2015)
- The Drifters Tour (ProbCause) (2015)
- Hotel Paranoia Tour (Jazz Cartier) (2016)
- Catch Me If You Can Tour (JID) (2019)
