= Jhené Aiko discography =

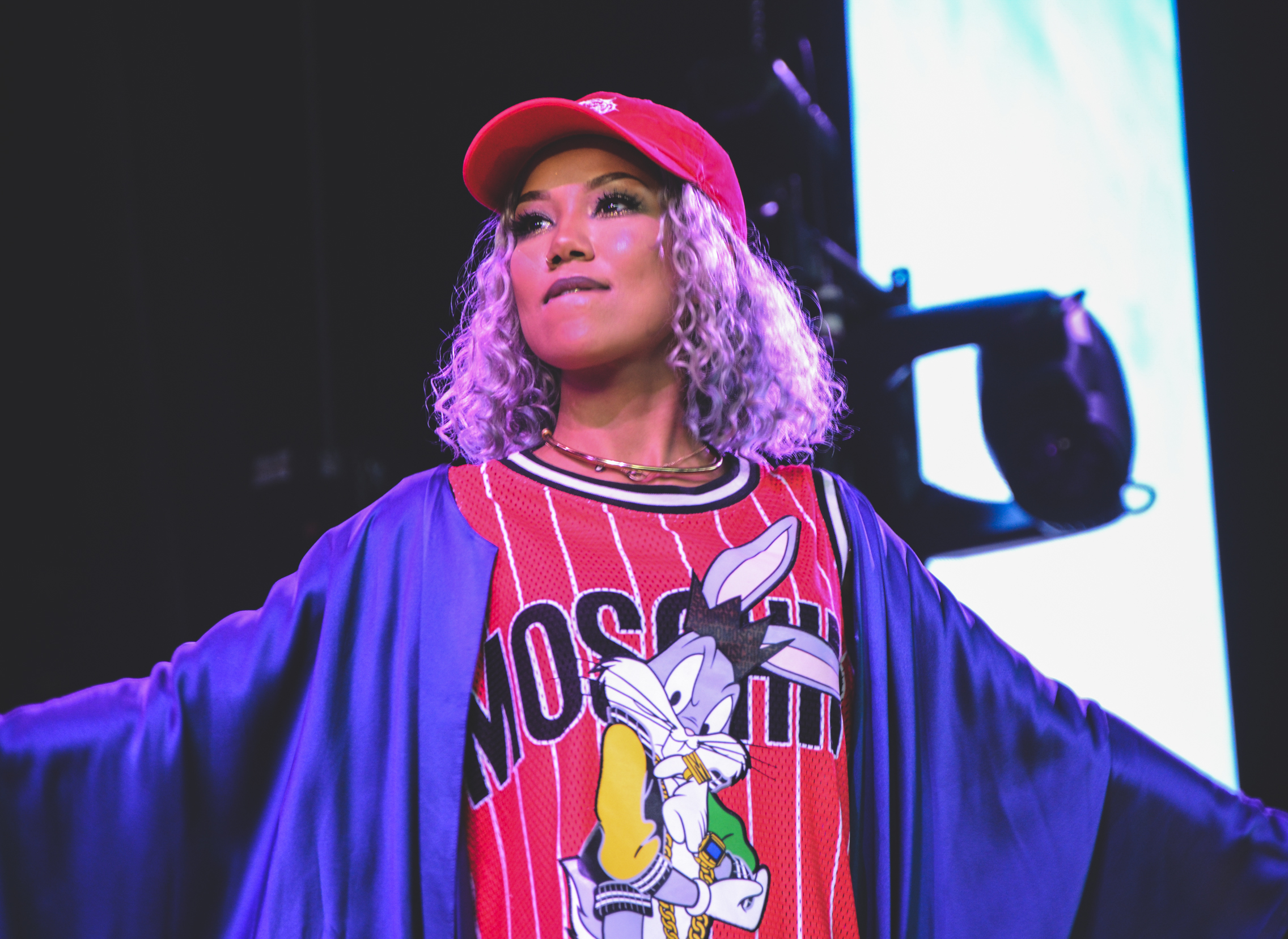
- Jhené Aiko performing in Canada in 2016
- Studio albums: 4
- EPs: 1
- Compilation albums: 1
- Singles: 41
- Music videos: 21
- Mixtapes: 1

The discography of American singer Jhené Aiko consists of four studio albums, one compilation album, one extended play (EP), one mixtape, forty-one singles (thirteen as a featured artist), and twenty-one music videos.

Aiko initially garnered attention as the alleged-to-be cousin of Lil' Fizz, a rapper from the American R&B group B2K, though they are not related. This connection was used as a marketing strategy by her labels Sony, TUG and Epic to promote her through B2K and attract an audience. Aiko has stated that she and Lil' Fizz grew up together and were close like family. In 2003, her labels released the song "No L.O.V.E" as a CD single, accompanied by a music video that premiered on BET's 106 & Park when she was 15 years old. Aiko was then scheduled to release her debut album, My Name Is Jhené, but it was ultimately shelved due to internal issues at Epic, leading Aiko to request a release from the label. She subsequently left the label to focus on her education and family.

In March 2011, Aiko returned to music with the release of her first full-length project, a mixtape titled Sailing Soul(s). On December 16, 2011, she signed a recording contract with American record producer No I.D.'s record label Artium, distributed through Def Jam. In 2013, she was featured on American rapper Big Sean's single "Beware", which also featured Lil Wayne and became her first top-40 hit on the US Billboard Hot 100 chart. In November 2013, she released her first EP, titled Sail Out, supported by the singles "3:16AM", "Bed Peace" and "The Worst". In June 2014, she released "To Love & Die", the lead single from her debut studio album Souled Out.

== Studio albums ==
List of albums, with selected details and chart positions
Title	Album details	Peak chart positions										Sales	Certifications
Title	Album details	US	US HH	US R&B	AUS	CAN	NLD	NZ	SWI	UK	UK R&B	Sales	Certifications
Souled Out	Released: September 9, 2014; Label: ARTium, Def Jam; Formats: CD, LP, digital download, streaming	3	1	1	—	20	100	—	—	23	2	US: 125,315	RIAA: Platinum; BPI: Silver
Trip	Released: September 22, 2017; Label: ARTium, Def Jam; Formats: CD, LP, digital download, streaming	5	4	1	—	36	81	—	—	56	8		RIAA: Platinum; RMNZ: Platinum
Chilombo	Released: March 6, 2020; Label: ARTium, Def Jam; Formats: CD, LP, digital download, streaming	2	2	1	29	7	40	23	72	13	8	US: 81,000	RIAA: Platinum; BPI: Silver; RMNZ: Gold
Westside Whimsy	Released: September 11, 2026; Label: ArtClub, Def Jam; Formats: CD, LP, digital download, streaming	1	1	1	42	33	49	22	75	41	33		
"—" denotes an album that did not chart or was not released in that territory.

=== Collaborative albums ===
List of albums, with selected chart positions
Title	Album details	Peak chart positions			
Title	Album details	US	US R&B/HH	US R&B	US Rap
Twenty88 (with Big Sean)	Released: April 1, 2016; Label: ARTium, Def Jam, GOOD Music; Formats: CD, digital download, streaming	5	1	1	1

=== Miscellaneous ===
List of miscellaneous albums, with selected information
Title	Album details	Notes
My Name Is Jhené	Released: 2003 (US); Label: Sony, TUG, Epic; Format: Bootleg, digital download	Originally meant to be released as Aiko's debut studio album.

== Compilation albums ==
List of compilation albums, with selected details and chart positions
Title	Album details	Peak chart positions			Certifications
Title	Album details	US	US R&B/HH	NZ	Certifications
The Magic Hour Collection	Released: November 22, 2024; Label: Def Jam; Formats: CD, LP, digital download, streaming	136	46	24	BPI: Silver; RMNZ: Gold

== EPs ==
List of extended plays, with selected details and chart positions
Title	Details	Peak chart positions			Sales	Certifications
Title	Details	US	US R&B/HH	US R&B	Sales	Certifications
Sail Out	Released: November 12, 2013; Label: ARTium, Def Jam; Format: CD, digital download, streaming	8	2	1	US: 300,000	RIAA: Gold; BPI: Gold; RMNZ: Gold

== Mixtapes ==
List of mixtapes
Title	Album details	Peak chart positions
Title	Album details	US
Sailing Soul(s)	Released: March 16, 2011; Label: Self-released; Format: Digital download, streaming	180

== Singles ==
=== As lead artist ===
List of singles, with selected chart positions, showing year released and album name
Title	Year	Peak chart positions								Certifications	Album
Title	Year	US	US HH	US R&B	US R&B/HH Air.	US R&B/HH Dig.	US Rhy.	NZ Hot	UK	Certifications	Album
"No L.O.V.E"	2002	—	—	—	—	—	—	—	—		My Name Is Jhené
"3:16AM"	2012	—	—	—	—	—	—	—	—		Sail Out
"Bed Peace" (featuring Childish Gambino)	2013	—	— (Note: "Bed Peace" did not enter the Billboard Hot R&B/Hip-Hop Songs chart, but peaked at number one on the Bubbling Under R&B/Hip-Hop Singles chart.)	25	—	—	—	—	—	RIAA: 2× Platinum; BPI: Silver; RMNZ: Platinum	Sail Out
"The Worst"	2014	43	11	9	1	21	10	—	—	RIAA: 5× Platinum; BPI: Gold; RMNZ: Platinum	Sail Out
"To Love & Die" (featuring Cocaine 80s)	2014	—	46	20	—	22	—	—	72		Souled Out
"The Pressure"	2014	—	— (Note: "The Pressure" did not enter the Billboard Hot R&B/Hip-Hop Songs chart, but peaked at number four on the Bubbling Under R&B/Hip-Hop Singles chart.)	23	—	36	—	—	—	RIAA: Gold	Souled Out
"Spotless Mind"	2015	—	— (Note: "Spotless Mind" did not enter the Billboard Hot R&B/Hip-Hop Songs chart, but peaked at number seven on the Bubbling Under R&B/Hip-Hop Singles chart.)	—	—	31	—	—	—	RIAA: Platinum; RMNZ: Gold	Souled Out
"Sorry to Interrupt" (with Jessie J and Rixton)	2015	—	—	—	—	—	—	—	—		Non-album singles
"Maniac"	2016	—	—	—	—	—	—	—	—		Non-album singles
"While We're Young"	2017	— (Note: "While We're Young" did not enter the Billboard Hot 100, but peaked at number five on the Bubbling Under Hot 100 Singles chart.)	46	9	23	—	—	—	—	RIAA: 3× Platinum; BPI: Silver; RMNZ: Platinum	Trip
"Sativa" (featuring Rae Sremmurd or only Swae Lee)	2018	74	32	6	9	—	18	—	—	RIAA: 5× Platinum; BPI: Gold; RMNZ: 2× Platinum	Trip
"Never Call Me" (featuring Kurupt)	2018	—	—	19	—	—	—	—	—	RIAA: Platinum; RMNZ: Gold	Trip
"Triggered (Freestyle)"	2019	51	19	3	42	14	—	20	—	RIAA: 2× Platinum; RMNZ: Gold	Chilombo
"None of Your Concern" (featuring Big Sean)	2019	55	26	7	—	5	—	25	97	RIAA: 2× Platinum	Chilombo
"Pussy Fairy (OTW)"	2020	40	23	5	5	14	10	20	84	RIAA: Platinum; BPI: Silver; RMNZ: Platinum	Chilombo
"Happiness Over Everything (H.O.E.)" (featuring Future and Miguel)	2020	65	41	8	—	25	—	31	—	RIAA: Platinum	Chilombo
"B.S." (featuring H.E.R.)	2020	24	15	5	2	4	1	15	64	RIAA: 2× Platinum; BPI: Silver; RMNZ: Platinum	Chilombo
"Lead the Way"	2021	—	—	—	—	—	—	—	—		Raya and the Last Dragon
"In the Dark" (with Swae Lee)	2021	—	—	—	—	—	—	—	—		Shang-Chi and the Legend of the Ten Rings
"Wrap Me Up"	2021	—	—	23	—	—	—	—	—		Non-album single
"In the Dark" (with August 08)	2022	—	—	—	—	—	—	—	—		Seasick
"Sunshine" (with Tyga and Pop Smoke)	2022	— (Note: "Sunshine" did not enter the Billboard Hot 100, but peaked at number seven on the Bubbling Under Hot 100 Singles chart.)	44	—	—	—	—	—	—	RIAA: Gold; RMNZ: Gold	Non-album singles
"Calm & Patient"	2023	—	—	24	—	—	—	—	—		Non-album singles
"Sun/Son"	2024	—	—	—	—	—	—	—	—		Non-album singles
"Guidance"	2024	—	—	—	—	—	—	—	—		Non-album singles
"Gorgeous" (with Snoop Dogg and Dr. Dre)	2024	—	—	—	—	—	—	22	—		Missionary
"I Am Not Afraid (Creation Mantra)"	2025	—	—	—	—	—	—	—	—		Non-album single
"Break"	2025	73	21	13	—	—	—	—	—		Westside Whimsy
"California Dream" (with Larry June)	2026	—	—	—	—	—	—	—	—		Who Coppin
"—" denotes a recording that did not chart, or was not released in that territory.

=== As featured artist ===
List of singles, with selected chart positions, showing year released and album name
Title	Year	Peak chart positions							Certifications	Album
Title	Year	US	US R&B /HH	AUS	CAN	NZ Hot	UK	UK R&B	Certifications	Album
"Body on Me" (H.O.P.E. Wright featuring Jhené Aiko)	2011	—	—	—	—	—	—	—		Believe in H.O.P.E. Wright
"Beware" (Big Sean featuring Jhené Aiko and Lil Wayne)	2013	38	10	—	—	—	183	28	RIAA: 4× Platinum; BPI : Silver; RMNZ: Platinum	Hall of Fame
"Angel" (Billionaire B featuring Jhené Aiko)	2014	—	—	—	—	—	—	—		Canadian Nights & Domaine Romanee Conti
"French Riviera" (Joke featuring Jhené Aiko)	2014	—	—	—	—	—	—	—		Ateyaba
"Post to Be" (Omarion featuring Chris Brown and Jhené Aiko)	2014	13	6	79	49	—	74	11	RIAA: 6× Platinum; BPI : Platinum; RMNZ: 3× Platinum	Sex Playlist
"Contradiction" (Mali Music featuring Jhené Aiko)	2015	—	—	—	—	—	—	—		Chi-Raq (Original Motion Picture Soundtrack)
"It's a Vibe" (2 Chainz featuring Ty Dolla Sign, Trey Songz, and Jhené Aiko)	2017	44	20	—	81	—	—	—	RIAA: 5× Platinum; BPI: Silver; MC: 3× Platinum; RMNZ: 3× Platinum	Pretty Girls Like Trap Music
"Naked Truth" (Sean Paul featuring Jhené Aiko)	2018	—	—	—	—	—	—	—		Mad Love the Prequel
"Freedom" (Kris Wu featuring Jhené Aiko)	2018	—	—	—	—	—	—	—		Antares
"Back to the Streets" (Saweetie featuring Jhené Aiko)	2020	58	24	—	—	17	—	—	RIAA: Platinum; MC: Gold; RMNZ: Gold	Pretty Bitch Music
"By Yourself" (Ty Dolla Sign featuring Jhené Aiko and Mustard, also remix with Bryson Tiller)	2021	— (Note: "By Yourself" did not enter the Billboard Hot 100, but peaked at number 16 on the Bubbling Under Hot 100 Singles chart.)	—	—	—	30	—	—		Featuring Ty Dolla Sign
"Can't Hide It" (Lil Durk featuring Jhené Aiko)	2025	84	24	—	—	21	—	—		Deep Thoughts
"—" denotes a recording that did not chart or was not released in that territory.

=== Promotional singles ===
List of promotional singles, with selected chart positions, showing year released and album name
Title	Year	Peak chart positions			Certifications	Album
Title	Year	US Bub.	US R&B	US Rhy.	Certifications	Album
"Wading"	2014	—	—	—	RIAA: Gold	Souled Out
"First Fuck" (with 6lack)	2017	—	—	—	RIAA: Gold	Non-album single
"Hello Ego" (featuring Chris Brown)	2017	—	—	—		Trip
"Wasted Love Freestyle"	2019	—	—	—		Non-album singles
"Trigger Protection Mantra"	2019	—	—	—		Non-album singles
"Born Tired"	2021	17	23	37		Chilombo
"—" denotes a recording that did not chart, or was not released in that territory.

== Other charted and certified songs ==
List of songs, with selected chart positions and certifications, showing year released and album name
Title	Year	Peak chart positions									Certifications	Album
Title	Year	US	US R&B /HH	US R&B	US Dance	FRA	NZ Hot	SA Stream.	UK	UK R&B	Certifications	Album
"Stranger"	2011	—	—	—	—	—	—	*	—	—	BPI: Silver; RMNZ: Gold	Sailing Soul(s)
"From Time" (Drake featuring Jhené Aiko)	2013	67	26	—	—	126	—	*	56	13	RIAA: Platinum; BPI: Platinum; RMNZ: Platinum	Nothing Was the Same
"Stay Ready (What a Life)" (featuring Kendrick Lamar)	2013	—	—	—	—	—	—	*	—	—	RIAA: Platinum; BPI: Gold; RMNZ: Platinum	Sail Out
"Comfort Inn Ending (Freestyle)"	2013	—	—	—	—	—	—	*	—	—	RIAA: Platinum	Sail Out
"Drunk Texting" (Chris Brown featuring Jhené Aiko)	2014	— (Note: "Drunk Texting" did not enter the Billboard Hot 100, but peaked at number 24 on the Bubbling Under Hot 100 Singles chart.)	46	17	—	—	—	*	128	33	RIAA: Platinum; RMNZ: Gold	X
"W.A.Y.S"	2014	—	—	—	—	—	—	*	—	—	RIAA: Platinum	Souled Out
"Lyin King"	2014	—	—	—	—	—	—	*	—	—	RIAA: Gold	Souled Out
"Wading"	2014	—	—	—	—	—	—	*	—	—	RIAA: Gold	Souled Out
"Eternal Sunshine"	2014	—	—	—	—	—	—	*	—	—	RIAA: Gold	Souled Out
"Promises" (featuring Miyagi and Namiko Love)	2014	—	—	—	—	—	—	*	—	—	RIAA: Platinum	Souled Out
"Remember"	2014	—	—	—	—	—	—	*	—	—	RIAA: Gold	Souled Out
"Blue Dream"	2014	—	—	—	—	—	—	*	—	—	RIAA: Platinum	Souled Out
"I Know" (Big Sean featuring Jhené Aiko)	2015	— (Note: "I Know" did not enter the Billboard Hot 100, but peaked at three on the Bubbling Under Hot 100 Singles chart.)	37	—	—	—	—	*	—	—	RIAA: 3× Platinum; BPI: Silver; RMNZ: Platinum	Dark Sky Paradise
"Moments" (featuring Big Sean)	2017	—	—	—	—	—	—	*	—	—	RIAA: Gold	Trip
"When We Love"	2017	—	—	—	—	—	—	*	—	—	RIAA: Gold	Trip
"New Balance"	2017	—	—	—	—	—	—	*	—	—	RIAA: Gold	Trip
"Juicy Booty" (Chris Brown featuring Jhené Aiko and R. Kelly)	2017	—	—	—	—	—	—	*	—	—	RIAA: Gold; RMNZ: Gold	Heartbreak on a Full Moon
"I'll Kill You" (Summer Walker featuring Jhené Aiko)	2019	61	29	7	—	—	—	*	—	—	RIAA: 2× Platinum; ARIA: Gold; BPI: Silver; MC: Gold; RMNZ: Gold	Over It
"Lotus (Intro)"	2020	— (Note: "Lotus (Intro)" did not enter the Billboard Hot 100, but peaked at number 23 on the Bubbling Under Hot 100 Singles chart.)	—	—	—	—	—	*	—	—		Chilombo
"Speak"	2020	— (Note: "Speak" did not enter the Billboard Hot 100, but peaked at number six on the Bubbling Under Hot 100 Singles chart.)	—	14	—	—	—	*	—	—		Chilombo
"One Way St." (featuring Ab-Soul)	2020	— (Note: "One Way St." did not enter the Billboard Hot 100, but peaked at number nine on the Bubbling Under Hot 100 Singles chart.)	—	16	—	—	—	*	—	—		Chilombo
"Surrender" (featuring Dr. Chill)	2020	— (Note: "Surrender" did not enter the Billboard Hot 100, but peaked at number 16 on the Bubbling Under Hot 100 Singles chart.)	—	22	—	—	—	*	—	—		Chilombo
"Tryna Smoke"	2020	— (Note: "Tryna Smoke" did not enter the Billboard Hot 100, but peaked at number ten on the Bubbling Under Hot 100 Singles chart.)	—	17	—	—	—	*	—	—		Chilombo
"10k Hours" (featuring Nas)	2020	— (Note: "10k Hours" did not enter the Billboard Hot 100, but peaked at number 13 on the Bubbling Under Hot 100 Singles chart.)	—	20	—	—	—	*	—	—		Chilombo
"Pray for You"	2020	— (Note: "Pray for You" did not enter the Billboard Hot 100, but peaked at number 20 on the Bubbling Under Hot 100 Singles chart.)	—	25	—	—	—	*	—	—		Chilombo
"Lightning & Thunder" (featuring John Legend)	2020	— (Note: "Lightning & Thunder" did not enter the Billboard Hot 100, but peaked at number 19 on the Bubbling Under Hot 100 Singles chart.)	—	24	—	—	—	*	—	—		Chilombo
"On the Way" (featuring Mila J)	2020	— (Note: "On the Way" did not enter the Billboard Hot 100, but peaked at number 21 on the Bubbling Under Hot 100 Singles chart.)	—	9	—	—	—	*	—	—	RIAA: Gold; RMNZ: Gold	Chilombo
"Above and Beyond"	2020	—	—	12	—	—	—	*	—	—	RIAA: Gold	Chilombo
"Summer 2020"	2020	—	—	13	—	—	—	*	—	—		Chilombo
"Change Your Life" (Kehlani featuring Jhené Aiko)	2020	80	37	6	—	—	15	*	—	—		It Was Good Until It Wasn't
"U Move, I Move" (John Legend featuring Jhené Aiko)	2020	— (Note: "U Move, I Move" did not enter the Billboard Hot 100, but peaked at number 25 on the Bubbling Under Hot 100 Singles chart.)	—	13	—	—	11	*	—	—		Bigger Love
"Body Language" (Big Sean featuring Ty Dolla Sign and Jhené Aiko)	2020	95	35	—	—	—	—	*	—	—	RIAA: Gold	Detroit 2
"One of Dem Nights" (Moneybagg Yo featuring Jhené Aiko)	2021	— (Note: "One of Dem Nights" did not enter the Billboard Hot 100, but peaked at number 12 on the Bubbling Under Hot 100 Singles chart.)	50	—	—	—	—	*	—	—	RIAA: Gold	A Gangsta's Pain
"Backd00r" (Playboi Carti featuring Kendrick Lamar and Jhené Aiko)	2025	25	11	10	—	139	—	—	—	—		Music
"Mural" (with Swae Lee)	2026	—	—	20	—	—	34	—	—	—		Same Difference
"Wild Cat(s)"	2026	89	23	15	—	—	—	32	—	—		Westside Whimsy
"Ghost"	2026	42	12	7	—	—	9	14	—	—		Westside Whimsy
"Love Bomb" (with Ab-Soul)	2026	59	16	9	—	—	—	28	—	—		Westside Whimsy
"Ceiling (Freestyle)"	2026	54	15	8	—	—	16	20	—	—		Westside Whimsy
"Nothing Nice to Say"	2026	69	19	11	—	—	—	37	—	—		Westside Whimsy
"He Belongs"	2026	41	11	6	—	—	11	13	—	—		Westside Whimsy
"Like, Whatever" (featuring Tyga)	2026	72	20	12	—	—	—	33	—	—		Westside Whimsy
"You"	2026	96	26	16	—	—	—	46	—	—		Westside Whimsy
"Don't Be That Guy"	2026	— (Note: "Don't Be That Guy" did not enter the Billboard Hot 100, but peaked at number 1 on the Bubbling Under Hot 100 chart.)	29	18	—	—	—	62	—	—		Westside Whimsy
"Lullaby"	2026	— (Note: "Lullaby" did not enter the Billboard Hot 100, but peaked at number 3 on the Bubbling Under Hot 100 chart.)	31	19	—	—	—	55	—	—		Westside Whimsy
"Neighbors" (featuring Larry June)	2026	— (Note: "Neighbors" did not enter the Billboard Hot 100, but peaked at number 8 on the Bubbling Under Hot 100 chart.)	34	20	—	—	—	81	—	—		Westside Whimsy
"Mine"	2026	— (Note: "Mine" did not enter the Billboard Hot 100, but peaked at number 9 on the Bubbling Under Hot 100 chart.)	35	21	—	—	—	79	—	—		Westside Whimsy
"So Good" (with Kendrick Lamar)	2026	26	5	3	—	—	2	3	—	—		Westside Whimsy
"Beach Boy"	2026	— (Note: "Beach Boy" did not enter the Billboard Hot 100, but peaked at number 18 on the Bubbling Under Hot 100 chart.)	42	25	—	—	—	75	—	—		Westside Whimsy
"Unicorn"	2026	— (Note: "Unicorn" did not enter the Billboard Hot 100, but peaked at number 13 on the Bubbling Under Hot 100 chart.)	38	23	—	—	—	91	—	—		Westside Whimsy
"I Don't Mind"	2026	— (Note: "I Don't Mind" did not enter the Billboard Hot 100, but peaked at number 16 on the Bubbling Under Hot 100 chart.)	39	24	—	—	—	94	—	—		Westside Whimsy
"—" denotes a recording that did not chart, or was not released in that territory. "*" denotes that the chart did not exist at that time.

== Guest appearances ==
List of non-single guest appearances, with other performing artists, showing year released and album name
Title	Year	Other performer(s)	Album
"My Name Is Jhene" (Intro)	2002	B2K	B2K: The Remixes - Volume 1
"He Couldn't Kiss" (Album Version)	2002	B2K	B2K: The Remixes - Volume 1
"Gonna Love You Anyway" (Snippet)	2002	B2K	B2K: The Remixes - Volume 1
"Stuck Like This" (Snippet)	2002	B2K	B2K: The Remixes - Volume 1
"Cherry Pie"	2002	none	The Master of Disguise Soundtrack
"Sneaky"	2002	Lil Fizz	Barbershop Soundtrack
"Santa Baby"	2002	B2K	Santa Hooked Me Up
"Dog"	2002	B2K	Pandemonium!
"Stuck Like This"	2003	B2K	The Remixes - Volume 2
"Sensitive"	2003	Needa S., Da Brat	What?
"Sensitive" (Remix)	2003	Needa S, Da Brat, Mila J	What?
"De Ja Vu"	2003	none	Kids Choice Awards 2003 – Volume 4
"Happy"	2004	B2K	You Got Served Soundtrack
"Right Here"	2005	none	The Proud Family Soundtrack
"How It's Done"	2006	none	Byou
"Growing Apart (From Everything)"	2010	Kendrick Lamar	Overly Dedicated
"Fantasy"	2011	Schoolboy Q	Setbacks
"Do Better Blues"	2011	H.O.P.E. Wright	Believe in H.O.P.E. Wright
"Nothin' New"	2011	Ab-Soul	Longterm Mentality
"Against the Odds"	2011	Promise	Awakening
"Higher G-Mix"	2011	Le$	Settle for Le$ Vol. 2
"Sex Drive"	2012	Schoolboy Q	Habits & Contradictions
"Life Rhymes"	2012	Casey Veggies	Customized Greatly Vol. 3
"Soulo Ho3"	2012	Ab-Soul	Control System
"Terrorist Threats"	2012	Ab-Soul, Danny Brown	Control System
"LA Song"	2012	Micahfonecheck, John Mayer	August Rush
"I'm Gonna Be"	2012	Big Sean	Detroit
"Cool Off"	2012	Wale	Folarin
"Fly Ass Pisces"	2013	Cocaine 80s, Common	Flower of Life
"Ex Again"	2013	Eric Bellinger	—N/a
"Break It Down"	2013	Logic	Young Sinatra: Welcome to Forever
"Sparks Will Fly"	2013	J. Cole	Born Sinner
"From Time"	2013	Drake	Nothing Was the Same
"Pink Toes"	2013	Childish Gambino	Because the Internet
"Drinking and Driving"	2013	none	Saint Heron
"Oh You Scared"	2014	Vince Staples	Shyne Coldchain Vol. 2
"Closure"	2014	Ab-Soul	These Days…
"Blak Majik"	2014	Common	Nobody's Smiling
"Drunk Texting"	2014	Chris Brown	X
"Win Some, Lose Some"	2015	Big Sean	Dark Sky Paradise
"I Know"	2015	Big Sean	Dark Sky Paradise
"Chains (Remix)"	2015	Nick Jonas	Nick Jonas X2
"Resistance"	2015	Hudson Mohawke	Lantern
"Lemme Know"	2015	Vince Staples, DJ Dahi	Summertime '06
"In a World of My Own / Very Good Advice"	2015	none	We Love Disney
"Worthy"	2015	Jeremih	Late Nights
"Let’s Make Some Noise"	2015	R. Kelly	The Buffet
"Wishing (Remix)"	2016	DJ Drama, Chris Brown, Tory Lanez, Fabolous, Trey Songz	—N/a
"Used to Love You"	2016	Yuna	Chapters
"Same Time, Pt. 1" (as TWENTY88)	2017	Big Sean	I Decided
"Wake Up Alone"	2017	The Chainsmokers	Memories...Do Not Open
"Plz Don't Go"	2017	Cashmere Cat	9
"Wrongs"	2018	Krept and Konan	7 Nights
"My Type" (Remix)	2019	Saweetie, City Girls	—N/a
"I'll Kill You"	2019	Summer Walker	Over It
"Wee Hours"	2020	The-Dream	SXTP4
"Change Your Life"	2020	Kehlani	It Was Good Until It Wasn't
"Vote (as featured on ABC’s Black-ish)"	2020	none	—N/a
"Stars in the Sky"	2020	Phora	With Love 2
"Consistency"	2022	Megan Thee Stallion	Traumazine
"Mural"	2026	Swae Lee	Same Difference
"California Dream"	2026	Larry June	Who Coppin

== Music videos ==
Title	Year	Director(s)	Other performer(s)	Album	Ref.
"No L.O.V.E."	2003	—N/a	—N/a	My Name Is Jhené	
"Stranger"	2011	Topshelf Jr.	—N/a	Sailing Soul(s)	
"My Mine"	2011	Topshelf Jr.	—N/a	Sailing Soul(s)	
"Fantasy"	2011	Jerome D	Schoolboy Q	Setbacks	
"Snapped"	2011	—N/a	—N/a	—N/a	
"3:16am"	2012	Topshelf Jr.	—N/a	Sail Out	
"Terrorist Threats"	2012	APLUSFilmz	Ab-Soul and Danny Brown	Control System	
"Mirrors"	2012	Topshelf Jr.	—N/a	—N/a	
"Burning Man (3:16pm)"	2013	Topshelf Jr.	—N/a	—N/a	
"Beware"	2013	Matthew Williams	Big Sean and Lil Wayne	Hall of Fame	
"Bed Peace"	2013	Topshelf Jr.	Childish Gambino	Sail Out	
"The Worst"	2013	Danny Williams	—N/a	Sail Out	
"My Afternoon Dream"	2014	Jhené Aiko and Krissy	—N/a	—N/a	
"Comfort Inn Ending (Freestyle)"	2014	Topshelf Jr.	—N/a	Sail Out	
"The Pressure"	2014	Childish Gambino, Calmatic	—N/a	Souled Out	
"Wading"	2014	Alex Nazari	—N/a	Souled Out	
"Spotless Mind"	2015	Jay Ahn	—N/a	Souled Out	
"Eternal Sunshine"	2015	Jay Ahn	—N/a	Souled Out	
"Lyin King/Limbo Limbo Limbo"	2015	TOCK and Topshelf Jr.	—N/a	Souled Out	
"I Know"	2015	Lawrence Lamont	Big Sean	Dark Sky Paradise	
"B's & H's"	2016	Topshelf Jr.	—N/a	—N/a	
"Out of Love"	2016	Lawrence Lamont	Twenty88	Twenty88	
"Maniac"	2017	Jhené Aiko and Topshelf Jr.	—N/a		
"While We're Young"	2017	Jay Ahn	—N/a	Trip	
"Sativa"	2018	EYES	Rae Sremmurd	Trip	
"Never Call Me" (Official Asian Version)	2018	Jay Ahn	—N/a	Trip	
"Never Call Me" (Slauson Hills Edition)	2018	Jay Ahn	Kurupt	Trip	
"Wrongs"	2018	KLVDR	Krept and Konan	7 Nights	
"Triggered (freestyle)"	2019	—N/a	—N/a	Chilombo	
"None Of Your Concern"	2019	—N/a	Big Sean	Chilombo	
"P*ssy Fairy (OTW)"	2020	Brandon Parker	—N/a	Chilombo	
"P*ssy Fairy (OTW)" (2nd Version)	2020	Brandon Parker	—N/a	Chilombo	
"Happiness Over Everything (H.O.E.)"	2020	Topshelf Jr.	Future, Miguel	Chilombo	
"Lotus (Intro)"	2020	Nick Peterson	—N/a	Chilombo	
"Magic Hour"	2020	Jhene Aiko	—N/a	Chilombo	
"B.S."	2020	Justin Richburg	H.E.R.	Chilombo	
"One Way St."	2020	Justin Richburg	Ab-Soul	Chilombo	
"Summer 2020"	2020	EYES	—N/a	Chilombo	
"Speak"	2020	Brandon Parker	—N/a	Chilombo	
"A&B"	2020	Brandon Parker	—N/a	Chilombo	
"Back to the Streets"	2020	Daniel Russell	Saweetie	Pretty B**ch Music	
"Down Again"	2020	Nick Peterson	Wiz Khalifa	Chilombo	
"Born Tired"	2020	Jhene Aiko	—N/a	Chilombo	
"10k Hours"	2020	Jhene Aiko	Nas	Chilombo	
"Lead the Way"	2021	Carlos López Estrada	—N/a	Raya and the Last Dragon (Original Motion Picture Soundtrack)	
"Missionary - A Short Film"	2025	Dave Meyers	Snoop Dogg, Dr. Dre, Alus	Missionary	
