= 3:16AM =

2012 single by Jhené Aiko

"3:16 am"

Single by Jhené Aiko

from the album Sail Out
- Released: September 4, 2012
- Genre: PBR&B
- Label: ARTium; Def Jam
- Songwriters: Jhené Aiko Chilombo; Mac Robinson; Brian Warfield
- Producer: Fisticuffs

Jhené Aiko singles chronology
"NO L.O.V.E" (2003)	"3:16 am" (2012)	"Beware" (2013)

"3:16AM" is the debut major-label single by American singer-songwriter Jhene Aiko, taken from her debut extended play, Sail Out (2013). Following the release of Aiko's debut mixtape Sailing Soul(s) (2011), Aiko signed a record deal with ARTium Records where she began work on her debut album. The song was released for digital download on September 4, 2012, through ARTium and Def Jam Recordings. The song was written by Aiko herself, along with her frequent collaborators Mac Robinson and Brian Warfield while the latter two handled the song's production under their production name Fisticuffs.

The song's accompanying music video was released on August 10, 2012 and was directed by Topshelf Jr. who had previously worked with Aiko, the video depicts Aiko in "troubling scenes" set in dimly lit rooms, woods and highways. To further promote the song Aiko performed it I've at the MSR Studios in New York City and at the Boombox's "Live Bytes" series. Aiko released a remix to the song on March 1, 2013 entitled "Burning Man (3:16pm)," the remix was accompanied with a knew visual also directed by TopShelfJunior.

== Background ==
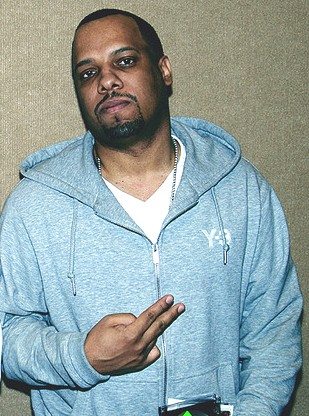
Ernest Wilson professionally known as No I.D., signed Aiko to his label.

She released a video for her single "NO L.O.V.E" which debuted on BET's 106 & Park when she was 15 years old. Jhené Aiko was set to release her self-titled debut album but the album was never released due to tension at the record label Epic, in which Aiko asked to be released from the label. Aiko then began to focus on school. Later at the age of 20, Aiko became pregnant by American R&B singer O'Ryan and gave birth in November 2008. Six months later she began to work and develop on the mixtape.

In March 2011, Aiko made her return to music with the release of her first full-length project, a mixtape titled .sailing soul(s).. On December 16, 2011, Aiko signed a recording contract with American record producer No I.D.'s record label Artium, distributed through Def Jam Recordings. Following the release of Sailing Soul(s). Aiko returned to the studio with production duo Fistcuffs, the song started as just a melody and Aiko decided that she was going to show what she was thinking about saying;

"After Sailing Soul(s)people gave their critique and I always felt like a lyricist more than a singer. I really want to show it off and whatever I’m thinking about, I’m going to write that down. I was in the studio and I just started saying what I was and the track ended at 3:16 and I didn’t really have a clear concept of what I was going to write about so I just kept writing, I did the first verse and they added to it and it was three weeks before I recorded or wrote anymore. The song kept growing into these thoughts."

3:16, is a song that last for a duration of three minutes and sixteen seconds that lyrically speaks about "addiction, not just drugs, addiction to anything that you go to when you’re in your darkest place and I think everyone can relate to that. We’ve all been to hell and back and that's pretty much what 3:16 is all about: going to hell and back". Aiko released the track "3:16AM" which was made available for digital download on iTunes September 4, 2012.

== Promotion ==
The song's accompanying music video was released on August 10, 2012 and was directed by Topshelf Jr. who had previously directed videos for songs from her debut mixtape. The video depicts Aiko in "troubling scenes" set in dimly lit rooms, woods and highways. The visual was inspired by horror movies because as a child AIko was "obsessed with The Twilight Zone and just scary movies that would be on late at night. I would get in trouble for it. My mom would tell me to go to bed and I would stay up and have nightmares and my mom would say, ‘That’s because you watch scary movies." During an interview with Complex magazine AIko spoke on the video's concept and inspiration saying;

“The visual was an ode to the Japanese scary movies. In my mind, I’m a schizophrenic. During the day I go through so many different emotions, at some point every day I’m in a depressed state, even if it’s just for five minutes but I’ll go there and it will be deep and dark. So “3:16" was me staying with it longer and writing about those moments."

On November 5, 2013 Aiko performed the song live at the MSR Studios in New York City along with songs from her debut mixtape. Aiko also performed the song with a live band for the Boombox's "Live Bytes" series.

== Remix ==
On March 1, 2013 Aiko released a remix to "3:16AM" entitled "Burning Man (3:16pm)." "Burning Man (3:16 pm) was written based on the Burning Man festival and Aiko wanted to writer a song that would make her feel like she was at the festival. The remix is a feel-good "breezy" R&B song with "good vibes." In contrast to its predecessor, "Burning Man" is an upbeat song that lyrically discusses "chemically-assisted good times with great friends," that sing i built over a "effervescent synth beat" provided by production duo Fisticuffs.

The song's video was directed by TopShelfJunior and features footage from her tour with Nas and Lauryn Hill. The video also depicts Aiko dressed as a chiefstress and lighting a bonfire on the beach with friends, the video also includes guest appearances from Omarion and James Fauntleroy. Throughout the video Aiko is seen dancing around a campfire and prancing along the shore. The song's video moves quickly, providing a hallucinatory effect throughout according to reviewer from Complex magazine.

== Track listings ==
Digital download

1. "3:16am" – 3:19

Digital download – Album version

1. "3:16am" – 3:21

== Credits ==
All credits adapted from All Music.

- Jhené Aiko – Composer, Primary Artist
- Mac Robinson – Composer
- Brian Warfield – Composer
- Fisticuffs – Production

== See also ==
- Jhené Aiko discography

== Release history ==
Country	Date	Format	Label
United States	September 4, 2012	Digital download	Island Def Jam Music Group
