= Bed Peace =

Single by Jhené Aiko featuring Childish Gambino

from the album Sail Out
- Released: September 17, 2013
- Genre: R&B
- Length: 4:16
- Label: ARTclub; ARTium; Def Jam
- Songwriters: Jhené Chilombo; Donald Glover; Mac Robinson; Brian Warfield
- Producer: Fisticuffs

Jhené Aiko singles chronology
"Beware" (2013)	"Bed Peace" (2013)	"The Worst" (2014)

Childish Gambino singles chronology
"Trouble" (2012)	"Bed Peace" (2013)	"3005" (2013)

"Bed Peace" is a song by American singer Jhené Aiko, taken from her debut EP, Sail Out (2013). The song was first premiered in July 2013 during a performance for Rap-Up Sessions, "Bed Peace" was later released as the EP's lead single on September 17, 2013, through ARTium and Def Jam Recordings. The song was produced by frequent collaborator Fisticuffs and features a guest appearance from American rapper Childish Gambino, who co-wrote the song along with Aiko.

Bed Peace is a mid tempo minimalist R&B song, with lyrics revolving around smoking marijuana and having sex, as she describes her ideal day. Upon its release, Bed Peace was met with generally positive reviews from critics, who praised Aiko's vocals and compared the song to the work of Aaliyah and Ciara. Commercially the song did not fare well, making no appearances on major charts, but did chart at number one on the US Billboard Bubbling Under R&B/Hip-Hop Singles.

The cover artwork and music video for "Bed Peace" pay homage and feature many references to John Lennon and Yoko Ono's Bed-Ins for Peace protest against the Vietnam War. The song's accompanying music video was released on October 28, 2013, and was directed by longtime collaborator Topshelf. The song was further promoted by various live performances, including at the Live Byte series and BBC Radio 1's Future Festival.

== Background ==
It was revealed in 2012 that Aiko's debut EP would feature production from producer Fisticuffs, who helped produce the majority of Aiko's 2011 mixtape Sailing Soul(s). Bed Peace was written by Aiko herself, along with her frequent collaborators Mac Robinson and Brian Warfield while the latter two handled the song's production under their production name Fisticuffs. During the writing and recording of Bed Peace Aiko purposely left a verse free, as she felt a feature was necessary. When looking for a feature she had the idea to find her "John Lennon" and began to send out requests to other artists, but a lot of the musicians were busy or had overlapping schedules. During an interview Aiko commented on the song's recording process and the choice to include Gambino;

"What ended up happening was, I was performing with Big Sean on Jimmy Kimmel and my publisher took me out to eat afterward. Childish Gambino came because he’s friends with one of my brother’s friends. That’s where we met, and we just talked and clicked. I really know him from his acting, from Community, and I knew that he rapped, but I never really listened and then, of course, I did my homework and I was like ‘You’re dope.’ We sent him the song maybe the next day, and he sent it back within the same day and he was the only person who did that—the only one that was excited about it. I told him my idea about John Lennon and Yoko Ono, and really just creating, like ‘You have to know that this means you’re my John Lennon now’ and he was down. He’s really cool. We’re good friends."

On July 12, 2013, Jhené Aiko premiered an acoustic version of "Bed Peace" during a performance for Rap-Up Sessions. "Bed Peace" was released as the lead single from her debut EP Sail Out on September 17, 2013. The source of inspiration for Bed Peace's artwork are the Bed-Ins for Peace protest against the Vietnam War by John Lennon and Yoko Ono.

== Composition ==
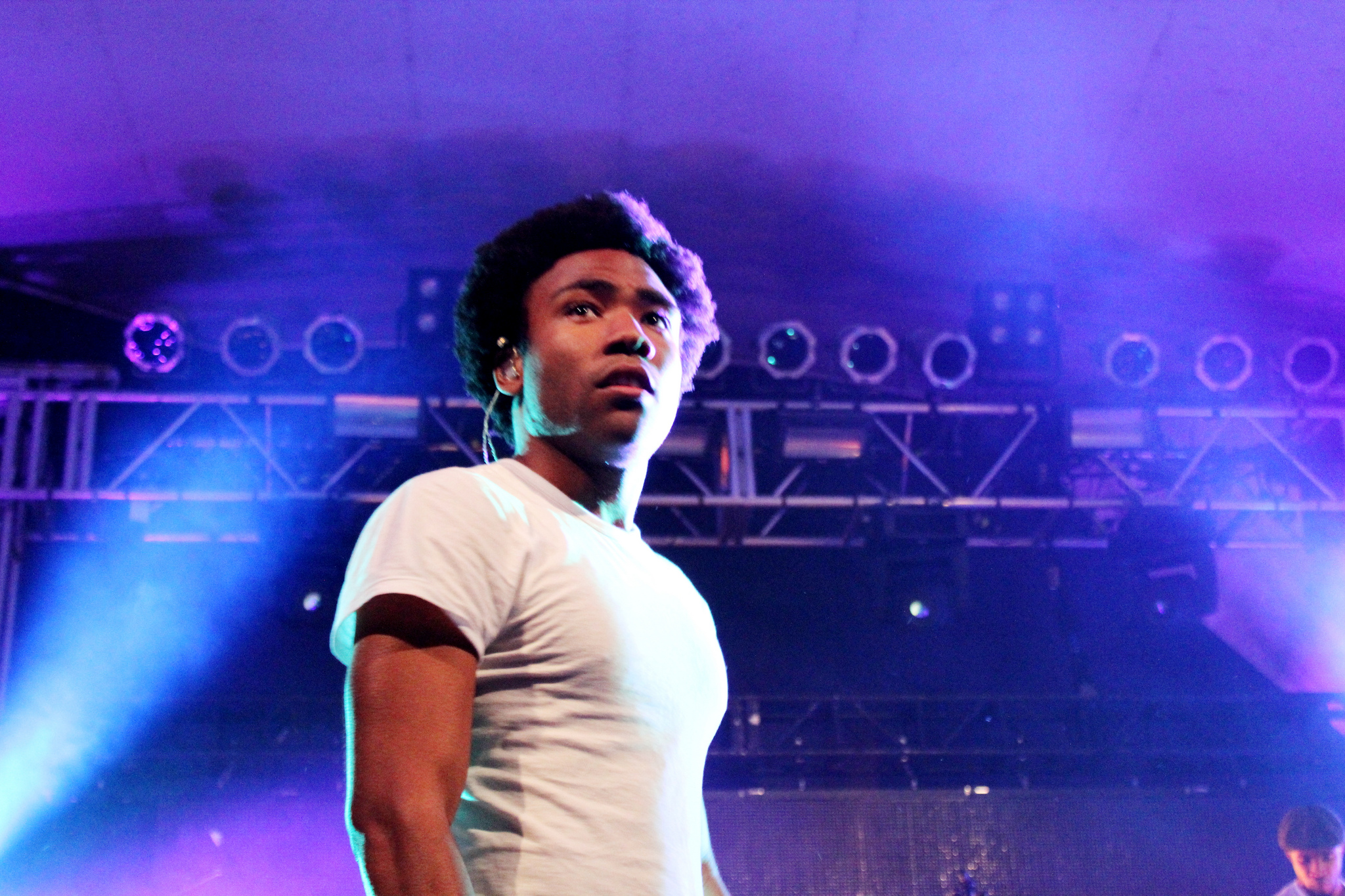
Musician Childish Gambino was featured on the song.

Bed Peace is a minimalist R&B song. Bed Peace is built over a "laid-back, mid tempo" production and contains a "breezy beat." The song contains a "soft melody" with Aiko "playfully singing", followed by a verse from Childish Gambino, which Edwin Ortiz of Complex magazine described as "calming." According to Rap-Up magazine the song has a "laidback vibe" which Aiko herself described as "It’s a very summer, feel-good type of song." Mike Wass of Idolator described the song as a "dreamy alt-soul" song, and noted Aiko's vocals on the track as being "silky smooth" and "jazz-tinged."

The song's lyrics feature Aiko singing about smoking marijuana and having sex, as she describes her ideal day. Commenting on the song's lyrics BJ of Consequence of Sound stated the song's lyrics are "simplistic" and Aiko is clear on her "demands", with the concept being introduced with lyrics including; "You show up right away/ We make love then and then we fuck/ And then you’d give me my space."

== Reception ==
Upon its release, Bed Peace was met with generally positive reviews from music critics. Ryan B. Patrick of Exclaim! praised the song and commended Aiko's vocals and she "breezes" over the "minimalist" track, Patrick continued to compare the song to the work of American R&B singer Ciara and the late singer Aaliyah. Jordan Sargent of Pitchfork Media also praised the song noting the song's lyrical content and Aiko's "fixation with weed'" Sargent continued to praise Aiko's use of intoxication as a metaphor. Edwin Ortiz of Complex magazine praised the single, and commended Aiko's choice to include Childish Gambino as a feature, Ortiz also praised the song's melody and playful lyrics.

A reviewer at Huffington Post praised the song particularly its lyrical content, stating that this song is "her take on modern day love, in her unique style, the track is a concoction of heart filled and sensual yet sex driven, drug fuelled and passionate." David Jeffries of AllMusic praised Aiko's "twist" on the work of Lennon calling it a "cheeky twist" and praised the song for being "light-stepping," Jeffries continued to praise the inclusion of rapper Gambino.

Commercially the song did not fare well, making no appearances on major charts however Bed Peace did chart at number one on the US 'Billboard Bubbling Under R&B/Hip-Hop Singles an extension of the US Hot R&B/Hip-Hop Songs chart.

== Music video ==
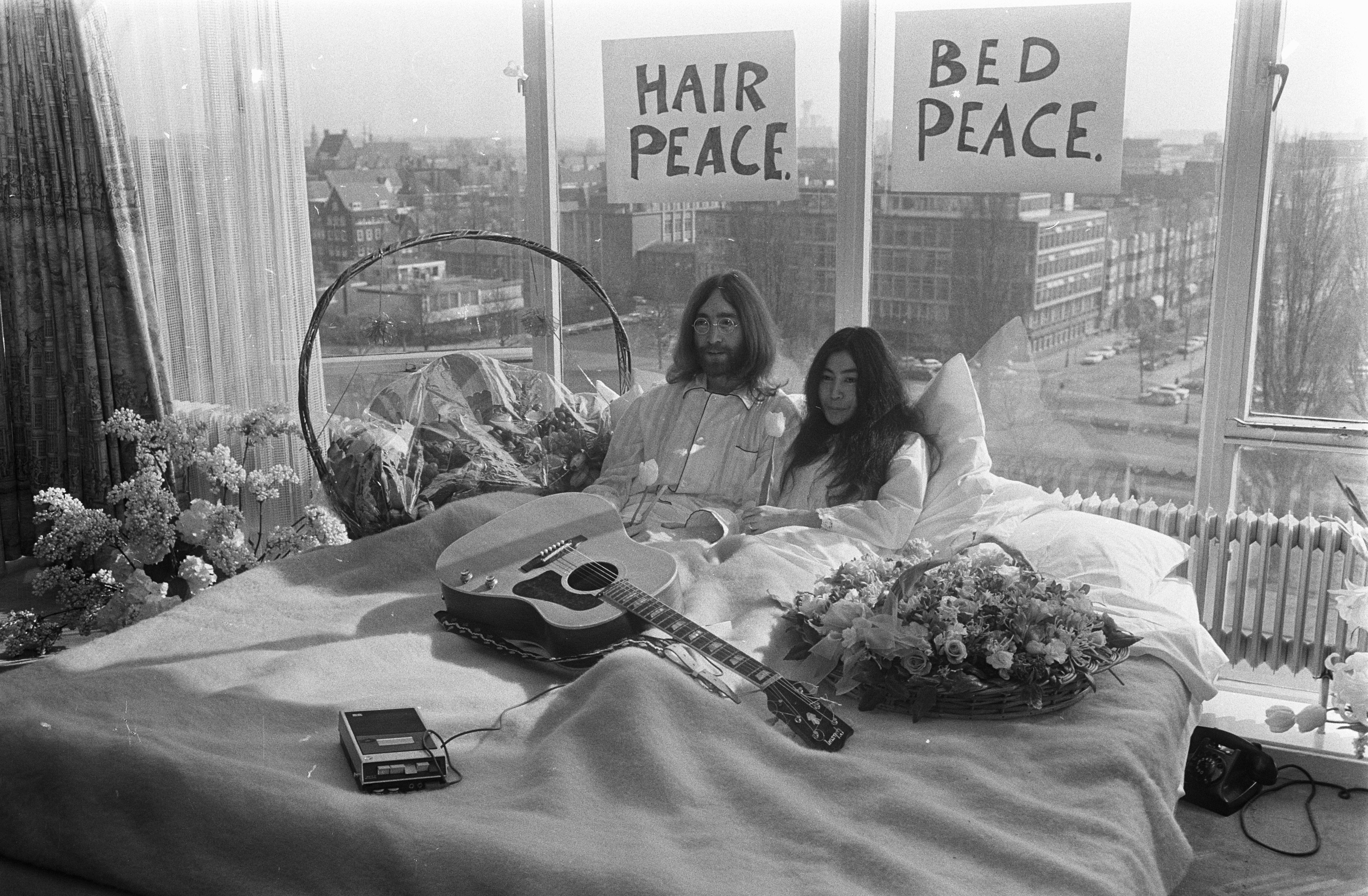
The song's video was influenced by John Lennon & Yoko Ono's Bed-In protest.

The song's accompanying music video was released on October 28, 2013, the video was directed by Topshelf who had previously working with Aiko on a number of videos including "Stranger", "My Mine" and "3:16AM". The song's video was premiered by American fashion magazine V. During an interview Aiko spoke on the video's influence and her choice to reference Lennon and Ono;

"I am a fan of anything that has to do with peace because I grew up in LA where there is not always a lot of peace, except by the beach. When I became a teenager, I started reading about things like Buddhism, which made me find inner peace. John Lennon was like a spokesperson for world peace, so I just fell in love with him and Yoko’s relationship. They were always in pictures together, and you could just feel the love. That was something I really admired, because people are so afraid to admit when they’re in love with someone.

The music video pays homage to John Lennon and Yoko Ono's Bed-Ins for Peace protest, and the artists use sun-filled scenery of a beautiful morning and 1970s feel, in order to do that. The two artists are dressed in all-white pajamas, as they lay in the bed of a high-rise Los Angeles apartment performing their respective parts of the song. The song breaks multiple times in the video as Aiko answers questions from a reporter who is interviewing her. The video also features many comparisons to the videos of Lennon and Ono's Bed-In protests. In a later interview with Vice, Aiko stated that her and Gambino were high on marijuana, using a portable vaporizer during the video's filming.

Mike Wass of Idolator praised the song's accompanying video, calling the video an "unexpectedly good fit" to its accompanying track. A reviewer at Rap-Up magazine praised the video for its "vintage" style, continuing to praise the influence and Aiko's idea to pay "homage" to John Lennon and Yoko Ono's Bed-Ins for Peace.

== Live performances ==
On November 21, 2013, Jhené Aiko performed the song for The BoomBox's and McDonald's' Live Byte series. On January 21, 2014, Aiko performed "Bed Peace", "From Time" and "The Worst" during BBC Radio 1's Future Festival.

== Track listing ==
Digital download

- Bed Peace featuring Childish Gambino - 4:16

== Credits and personnel ==
Credits adapted from AllMusic.

- Jhené Aiko - primary artist, songwriting
- Childish Gambino - featured artist, songwriting
- Fisticuffs - production

== Charts ==
Chart (2014)	Peak position
US Bubbling Under R&B/Hip-Hop Singles (Billboard)	1

== Certifications ==
Region	Certification	Certified units/sales
New Zealand (RMNZ)	Platinum	30,000^{‡}
United Kingdom (BPI)	Silver	200,000^{‡}
United States (RIAA)	2× Platinum	2,000,000^{‡}
^{‡} Sales+streaming figures based on certification alone.

== Release history ==
Country	Date	Format	Label
United States	September 17, 2013	digital download	Def Jam Recordings
