= The Worst (Jhené Aiko song) =

Single by Jhené Aiko

from the album Sail Out
- Released: January 14, 2014
- Recorded: 2012
- Genre: R&B; PBR&B
- Length: 4:14
- Label: ARTclub; ARTium; Def Jam
- Songwriters: Jhené Aiko Chilombo; Myron Birdsong; Mac Robinson; Brian Warfield; Shawn Carter; Chad Hugo; Pharrell Williams
- Producer: Fisticuffs

Jhené Aiko singles chronology
"Bed Peace" (2013)	"The Worst" (2014)	"To Love & Die" (2014)

"The Worst" is a song by American singer Jhené Aiko released on her debut EP Sail Out (2013). The song was released as its second official single and serviced to rhythmic contemporary radio on January 14, 2014, through ARTium and Def Jam Recordings. "The Worst" was written by Aiko, Myron Birdsong and produced by Fisticuffs. The song offers a sample of the 2003 single "Excuse Me Miss" by Jay-Z.

"The Worst" is an R&B and PBR&B song that lyrically explores Aiko's regret towards falling in love with someone not right for her. Commercially, the song peaked at number 43 on the Billboard Hot 100. "The Worst" peaked at number one on the airplay Mainstream R&B/Hip-Hop chart. "The Worst" won the Centric Award at the 2014 BET Awards. It was also nominated for Best R&B Song at the 57th Annual Grammy Awards.

An accompanying video directed by Danny Williams was released on November 11, 2013. The video depicts the aftermath of the murder of Aiko's boyfriend. Aiko performed the track on Late Night with Jimmy Fallon, BBC Radio 1′s Future Festival and The Ellen DeGeneres Show. "The Worst" was remixed by Jaden Smith, Stormzy, T.I. and Kirko Bangz. The single was certified platinum by the RIAA.

== Background ==
It was revealed in 2012 that Jhene Aiko's debut EP would feature production from producer Fisticuffs, who helped produce the majority of Aiko's 2011 mixtape Sailing Soul(s).

== Critical reception ==
Writing on behalf of Consequence of Sound, BJ called the song "forgettable", continuing on to say that the song does not "stick". Ryan B. Patrick of Exclaim! also gave the song a negative review stating that "The Worst" lacks "weight" and does not achieve the "intended trance effect," instead disappearing into the "ether" like "smoke."

== Commercial performance ==
On May 2, 2014, "The Worst" rose 3-1 on the Mainstream R&B/Hip-Hop Airplay chart. With this achievement, Aiko became first female artist to top the chart as a lead with a debut single since Jazmine Sullivan reached the same feat with "Need U Bad" in 2008. The Worst also rose forty seven to forty three on the Hot 100. The song peaked on the US Billboard Hot 100 at forty-three, becoming Aiko's first solo release to chart in the region, the song also peaked at number eleven on the US Hot R&B/Hip-Hop Songs

== Promotion ==
On November 11, 2013, Aiko debuted the song's accompanying music video. The video depicts Aiko being driven to murder due to her bad relationship, the video continues with Aiko sitting in her kitchen while her boyfriend lies on the floor. After committing murder, she makes herself a peanut butter and jelly sandwich, applies her makeup, and puts on her jewelry. She washes her hands of blood and calmly walks out of her house in lingerie to waiting cops. The video was described by Rap-Up as "dark and deadly." Aiko said the video depicted fantasy.

"I've never killed a guy, and I've never went to jail, but those are the things I have to get out of my head some way. It's writing a song and then turning my crazy thoughts into those moments where I'm like, I could really do that, but I'm not going to."

To promote the song, Aiko performed it live on various occasions. On January 18, 2014, she performed the song on "Late Night with Jimmy Fallon," accompanied by The Roots. The performance was described as "emotional" by online publication Rap-Up. On January 22, 2014 she performed the song at BBC Radio 1′s Future Festival in Maida Vale, London along with her band wearing a flowy white dress. The following month on February 13, Aiko performed the song on Conan. On May 27, 2014 Aiko performed the single on the "Ellen DeGeneres Show, the performance featured the lights turned low, and Aiko barefoot. On July 22, 2014 Aiko released a video of her preparing to go on tour and rehearsals. During the video she sang an acoustic rendition of the song along with her guitarist Jeff, during the video Aiko also performed "Stay Ready (What a Life)" and "To Love & Die".

== Remixes ==
The song has been remixed by a variety of artists. The first came from fifteen-year-old rapper Jaden Smith, in which he lyrically deals with the "complexity of a relationship." British rapper Stormzy remixed the song and released the music video on January 26, 2014. American rapper T.I. remixed the song for "DJ MLK's Goodnight Don't Exist in ATL 4," during the song the rapper draws on his own relationships and "responds to his scorned lover." The song was later remixed by roy Ave who added a short verse to the song. American rapper Kirko Bangz release a cover version of the song which featured Bangz free styling, Bangz also released an accompanying video to his free style.

On May 18, The Robert Glasper Trio released an instrumental cover of the song as a promotional single for their upcoming album, "Covered".

== Accolades ==
"The Worst" won the Centric Award at the BET Awards 2014, and was nominated for Best R&B Song at the 2015 Grammy Awards.

== Charts ==
=== Weekly charts ===
Chart (2013–2014)	Peak position
Belgium Urban (Ultratop Flanders)	40
US Billboard Hot 100	43
US Adult R&B Songs (Billboard)	4
US Hot R&B/Hip-Hop Songs (Billboard)	11
US Rhythmic Airplay (Billboard)	10

=== Year-end charts ===
Chart (2014)	position
US Hot R&B/Hip-Hop Songs (Billboard)	31
US Rhythmic (Billboard)	44

== Certifications ==
Region	Certification	Certified units/sales
New Zealand (RMNZ)	Platinum	30,000^{‡}
United Kingdom (BPI)	Gold	400,000^{‡}
United States (RIAA)	5× Platinum	5,000,000^{‡}
^{‡} Sales+streaming figures based on certification alone.

== Radio adds ==
Country	Date	Format	Label
United States	January 14, 2014	Rhythmic radio	Def Jam Recordings
