= Twenty88 =

2016 studio album by Big Sean and Jhené Aiko

Studio album by Twenty88
- Released: April 1, 2016
- Recorded: 2016
- Genres: Hip hop; R&B
- Length: 30:27
- Labels: GOOD; ARTium; Def Jam
- Producers: Detail; Cam O'bi; Flippa; KeY Wane; Tommy Brown; Mr. Franks; Sidney Swift; Steve Lacy; Jproof; Da Internz

Big Sean chronology
Dark Sky Paradise (2015)	Twenty88 (2016)	I Decided (2017)

Jhené Aiko chronology
Souled Out (2014)	Twenty88 (2016)	Trip (2017)

Singles from Twenty88
- 1. "On The Way" Released: April 25, 2016

Twenty88 (stylized as TWENTY88) is the debut studio album by American hip hop duo Twenty88, composed of rapper Big Sean and R&B singer-songwriter Jhené Aiko. It was released on April 1, 2016, by Def Jam Recordings, in a joint venture with both artists' imprint labels, Kanye West's GOOD Music and No I.D.'s ARTium Recordings. The album features guest appearances from American R&B group K-Ci & JoJo and record producer Detail. Production was handled by Detail himself, as well as KeY Wane, Tommy Brown, Sidney Swift, Cam O'bi, Steve Lacy, Flippa and Jproof.

Twenty88 peaked at number five on the Billboard 200 and saw generally positive reviews from music critics and fans of both artists.

On September 17, 2020, Big Sean revealed that a sequel album is "in the works". A track attributed to the project appeared on Sean's fifth album, Detroit 2 (2020).

== Background ==
On March 28, 2016, Big Sean and Jhené Aiko announced that they were forming a duo, called Twenty88. The Los Angeles singer and the Detroit rapper previously collaborated on the songs "Beware" (with Lil Wayne) from Sean's second album Hall of Fame (2013), as well as "I Know" from Sean's third album Dark Sky Paradise (2015). According to a press release from Tidal, the album tells the story of the highs and lows of a relationship, with insights into conflict, memories, love, and sex.

On March 29, Sean and Aiko appeared together on the cover of Flaunt to promote the album, Twenty88. For the cover story, they talked about the origin of the duo Twenty88, and their vision for the album. Aiko stated: "Music now doesn't really cater to the feelings of a real relationship. It's all about trapping and bragging. I feel like this project is something that's needed right now. Especially a whole project is just good for people to see. That duality is a perfect combination. It's a 70's aesthetic, but we're in the future." They drew from various influences: Blaxploitation films, James Bond, as well as Ex Machina.

In 2020, Sean talked about how the labels did not back the project despite the chemistry with Aiko and already popular songs they had together. Tidal essentially provided the backing for the project so that Sean and Aiko would not pay for it themselves.

== Recording and production ==
On March 28, 2016, it was revealed that the album would feature the productions from Key Wane, Detail and Tommy Brown. Big Sean and Aiko explained what fans could expect on the project. According to Uproxx, the album conjures 90s R&B and 70s experimental rock and soul. It also mixes neo-soul, ambient beats, and trap drums courtesy of producers like Da Internz. As a whole, Twenty88 is a departure from each artist's individual sounds. "It's a wide range. It gets turned up, then it gets melodic, then it gets vibed out. It touches all these things, but it sounds very cohesive. We've created another world. Both me and Sean are super into fantasy-driven movies and so combining stuff like robots and sex, that pretty much sums us up. Robots are sexy as shit. We've created these characters that are extensions of ourselves, it's highly sexual." In the interview with Flaunt, it was revealed that K-Ci & JoJo would be featured on the song, "Two-Minute Warning". The magazine described the song as, "the most sexually explicit song" on the album.

== Release and promotion ==
On March 27, 2016, Big Sean and Aiko created a Twitter account for Twenty88 showing two videos promoting the album. The first clip shows both artists sitting in the backseat of a car, and the second shows Aiko being filmed by a robot while she is likely in the middle of sexual intercourse with Sean. Both of them changed their profile pictures to the same one shown on the account of Twenty88, an album cover that shows Sean's face next to that of Aiko, who is donning an orange wig. They also both edited their Twitter bios to say, "1/2 of Twenty88", suggesting that Aiko and Sean formed the duo. After posting the short videos, they tweeted a picture of the album cover and wrote, "4/1". That tweet was retweeted by both Sean and Aiko and said the album would be released on April 1, 2016.

On March 31, the two made their television debut as Twenty88 on Jimmy Kimmel Live!, performing "Selfish". Tidal streamed the project exclusively for 72 hours starting on April 1, 2016. It was also available for purchase on iTunes the same day, and shared on other streaming platforms on April 3. On April 4, 2016, the album was made available on Spotify and Apple Music. After the release of their debut album, on April 8, 2016, the duo released a short video, titled "Out of Love", exclusively on Tidal.

== Critical reception ==
Professional ratings
Aggregate scores
Source	Rating
Metacritic	72/100
Review scores
Source	Rating
AllMusic	3.5/5 stars
HipHopDX	3.9/5 stars
Pitchfork	6.5/10
The 405	6.5/10

Twenty88 received positive reviews from music critics. The album received a score of 72/100 on Metacritic. Scott Glaysher of HipHopDX said, "Twenty88 is a pleasant surprise from two artists who are the top of their respective games. Their chemistry is unquestionable and the music derived from that unique harmony is constantly improving. Whether this is a complete one-off project or if they continue to make music under this duo moniker remains to be seen but for now, these eight songs will tide over the hopeless romantic in everyone."

Patrick Lyons of HotNewHipHop said: "If everything else about these eight tracks was just as bad, it'd be easy to write off, but the true tragedy is that Twenty88 seems like it could have been salvaged if Sean and Aiko just spent some more time writing. There are some truly intriguing concepts and song structures here, especially "Talk Show", where our two stars address each other like they're sitting on the couch of a relationship counseling show. Then there's the music itself. Flippa and frequent Sean collaborator Key Wane handle most of the production, and similarly to dvsn's Sept. 5th, they do an excellent job of updating classic R&B sounds into something sleek and modern. Sampling from sources as varied as Xscape, British DJ Mat Zo, old jazz standard 'Sentimental Journey,' and an effortlessly breezy '70s soul deep cut, they do a much better job than the vocalists at deploying a bunch of disparate elements for the end goal of creating something thematically linked but episodic. Wane has been steadily building on a Graduation-era Kanye sound for years now, and his work here is yet another marked improvement on his past discography; I had never heard of Flippa before this, but he's just as impressive. They both seem to have put a ton of time into flipping samples, constructing beats, and structuring songs, and it's disappointing when it doesn't feel like the people on the other side of the boards put in nearly as much work."

== Commercial performance ==
Twenty88 debuted at number five on the US Billboard 200, selling 48,000 equivalent copies; it sold 40,000 copies in its first week, and boasted over 8 million streams. The album debuted at number one on the Billboard's Digital Albums, Top R&B/Hip-Hop Albums, Rap Albums and R&B Albums.

== Track listing ==
No.	Title	Writer(s)	Producer(s)	Length
1.	"Déjà Vu"	Sean Anderson; Jhené Aiko Chilombo; Dwane Weir II; Cameron Osteen; Micah Powell	KeY Wane; Cam O'bi	4:11
2.	"Selfish"	Anderson; Chilombo; Marcos Palacios; Ernest Clark; Ronald "Flippa" Colson; Jameel Roberts; Steve Lacy; Janai El-Goni; Matan Zohar	@Flippa123; @JProof; Da Internz; Lacy^{[a]}	3:10
3.	"On the Way"	Anderson; Chilombo; Weir II; Amaire Johnson; Lester Brown; Benjamin Homer; Bud Green; Victoria McCants	KeY Wane; Cam O'bi; Johnson	3:23
4.	"Push It"	Anderson; Chilombo; Clark; Palacios; Colson	@Flippa123; @JProof; Da Internz	2:34
5.	"2 Minute Warning" (featuring K-Ci & JoJo and Detail)	Anderson; Chilombo; Sidney Swift; Noel "Detail" Fisher	Detail	4:39
6.	"Talk Show"	Anderson; Chilombo; Colson; Roberts; Clark; Palacios; Leroy Hutson; Joseph Scott; Roger Anfinsen	@Flippa123; @JProof; Da Internz	3:49
7.	"Memories Faded"	Anderson; Chilombo; Tommy Brown; Steven Franks; Johnson	Brown; Mr. Franks	4:12
8.	"London Bridge"	Anderson; Chilombo; Weir II; Ishmael Butler	KeY Wane	4:29
Total length:				30:27

Notes

- ^{^[a]} signifies a co-producer.

Sample credits

- "Deja Vu" contains a sample from "Softest Place On Earth" performed by Xscape
- "Selfish" contains a sample from "Time On Your Side" performed by Mat Zo.
- "On the Way" contains a sample from "Sentimental Journey", written by Benjamin Homer, Les Brown and Bud Green and performed by Singers Unlimited
- "Talk Show" contains a sample from "Love's Society" performed by The Natural Four.
- "London Bridge" contains a sample from "It's Good To Be Here" performed by Digable Planets.

== Charts ==
=== Weekly charts ===
Chart (2016)	Peak position
Australian Albums (ARIA)	82
Canadian Albums (Billboard)	28
UK Albums (Official Charts)	69
US Billboard 200	5
US Top R&B/Hip-Hop Albums (Billboard)	1

=== Year-end charts ===
Chart (2016)	Position
US Top R&B/Hip-Hop Albums (Billboard)	47

== Release history ==
Date	Format(s)	Label
1 April 2016	Digital download	GOOD
13 May 2016	CD	GOOD

== See also ==
- List of Billboard number-one R&B/Hip-Hop albums of 2016
