= Jhené Aiko =

American R&B singer (born 1988)

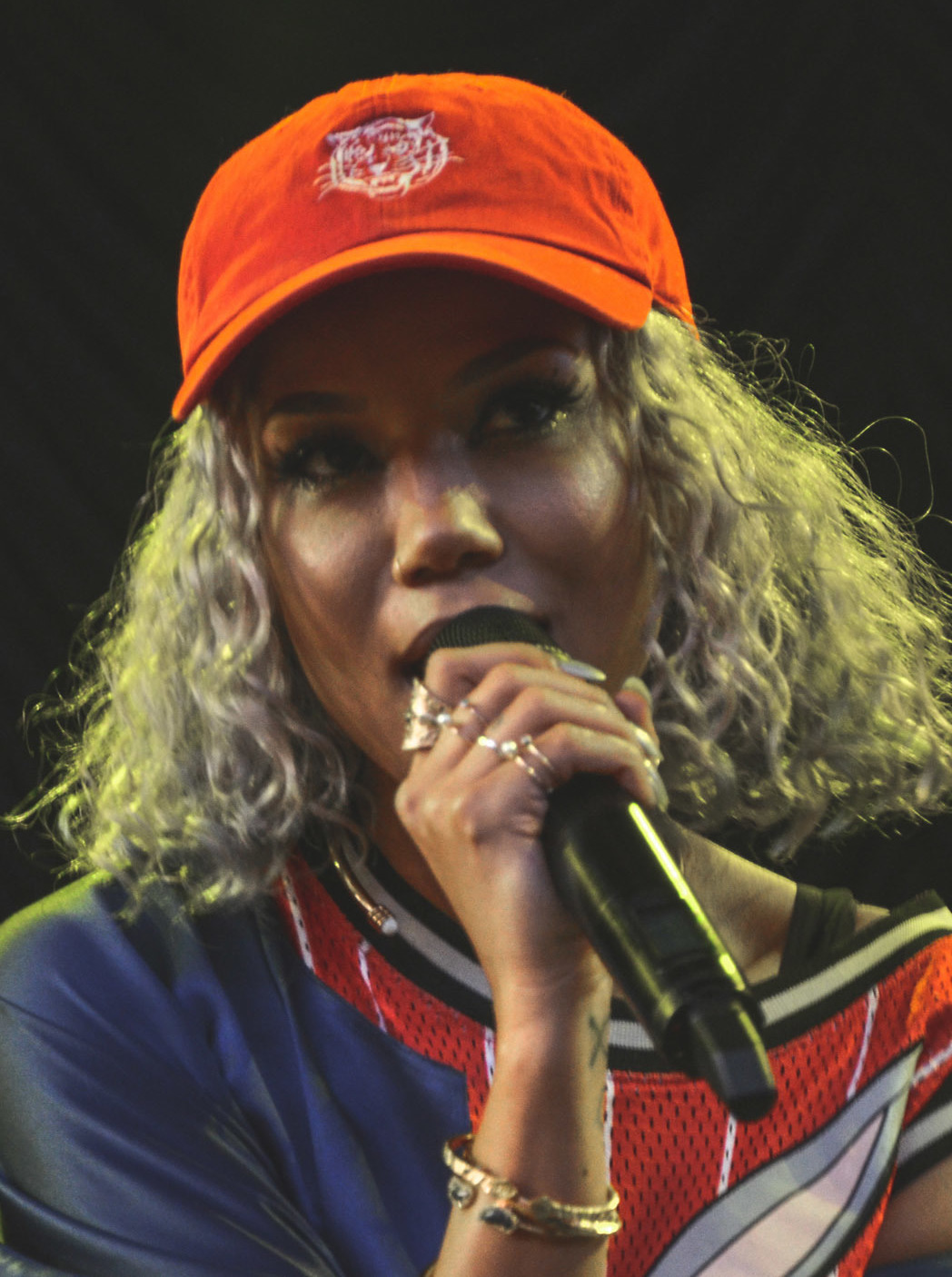
- Aiko in 2016
- Born: Jhené Aiko Efuru Chilombo; March 16, 1988 (age 38); Los Angeles, California, U.S.
- Education: West Los Angeles College
- Occupations: Singer; songwriter; musician; record producer
- Years active: 2002–present
- Works: Discography
- Spouse: Dot da Genius (m. 2014; div. 2017)
- Partners: O'Ryan (2005–2008); Big Sean (2016–2025); Larry June (2026–)
- Children: 2
- Relatives: Mila J (sister)
- Musical career
- Genres: R&B; neo soul
- Labels: ARTium; Def Jam; TUG; Epic
- Member of: Cocaine 80s; Twenty88
- Website: jheneaiko.com

Jhené Aiko Efuru Chilombo (/dʒəˈneɪ ˈaɪkoʊ/; juh-NAY-EYE-kow; born March 16, 1988) is an American R&B singer, songwriter, musician, and record producer. Aiko embarked on her musical career in 2002, as a backing vocalist and music video performer for the R&B group B2K. She was signed by their record label, The Ultimate Group that same year and was marketed as the "cousin" of B2K member Lil' Fizz to cultivate her own following, although they are not related. Her debut album, slated for a 2003 release through the label with Epic Records, was shelved due to Aiko instead further pursuing her education.

In March 2011, Aiko returned to music with the release of her first full-length project, a mixtape titled Sailing Soul(s). In December of that year, she signed a recording contract with producer No I.D.'s record label ARTium Recordings, an imprint of Def Jam Recordings. Aiko gained mainstream recognition with her guest performance alongside Lil Wayne on Big Sean's 2013 single, "Beware", which marked her first entry on Billboard Hot 100 — peaking within the chart's top 40. In November, she released her debut extended play (EP) Sail Out, which spawned the singles "3:16AM", "Bed Peace" (featuring Childish Gambino) and "The Worst"—the latter received quintuple platinum certification by the Recording Industry Association of America (RIAA).

Aiko's studio albums, Souled Out (2014), Trip (2017) and Chilombo (2020), were each met with critical and commercial success; the latter peaked at number two on the Billboard 200 and earned Aiko three Grammy Award nominations, including Album of the Year.

== Early life ==
Aiko was born on March 16, 1988, in Los Angeles, California. Her family lived in South Los Angeles, but their home burned down when she was seven and they moved near Slauson Avenue around View Park–Windsor Hills, Baldwin Hills, and Ladera Heights where she was homeschooled until high school. She calls her home neighborhood "Slauson Hills". Aiko is the daughter of Christina Yamamoto and pediatrician Karamo Chilombo (born Gregory Wycliff Barnes). Her parents are divorced. Aiko has seven siblings – four full siblings and three half-siblings from her father's side. Her older sister is R&B singer Mila J. Her mother is of Spanish, Dominican, and Japanese descent, and her father is of Native American, African-American, and German-Jewish descent. Her maternal grandfather was of Japanese descent and her maternal grandmother is of Dominican heritage. She took vocal lessons in Culver City, but quit when she unexpectedly became pregnant.

Aiko addressed her mixed heritage during a Twitter conversation: "I am less black than someone half black, but also less white [than] someone half white… and asian is the least thing i am," she said "So at this point, it’s whatever they want me to be. I have a Japanese grandfather and a Creole/Dominican grandmother on my mothers side and both of my fathers parents are black and white. my dna results came in 25% Asian, 33% African and 34% European. So that is what i was referencing in the tweet. also, those dna sites update and change from time to time so who actually knows. Ok now im done explaining, promise i am human and i see you all as family regardless of how u view me."

== Career ==
=== 2002–2006: Career beginnings and hiatus ===
Aiko embarked on her musical career contributing vocals to several B2K releases, as well as a song on The Master of Disguise soundtrack in 2002, while signed to The Ultimate Group and managed by Chris Stokes. During this time she was known as the cousin of B2K's rapper, Lil' Fizz, though she is not actually related to him. It was used as a marketing tool, suggested by her labels Sony, The Ultimate Group and Epic Records, to promote Aiko through B2K and attract an audience; nonetheless Aiko affirms that she and Lil' Fizz grew up together and were close like family. She featured on tracks five through eight of the R&B group's remix album B2K: The Remixes – Volume 1. "Santa Baby", a cover she recorded, was also featured on their album Santa Hooked Me Up and she appeared as a guest vocalist on the song "Tease" from Pandemonium!. Her song "Dog" appeared as a bonus track.

Aiko also appeared in numerous music videos including O'Ryan's debut video, "Take It Slow", B2K's debut video "Uh Huh" and "Why I Love You", P.Y.T.'s "Same Ol' Same Ol' (Remix)" featuring Sarai, Play's "M.A.S.T.E.R. (Part 2)" featuring Lil' Fizz video and Morgan Smith's 2004 video "Blow Ya Whistle". Aiko also has songs featured on the soundtracks of Barbershop, The Master of Disguise, You Got Served, The Proud Family and Byou. She released a video for her single "NO L.O.V.E" (re-recorded from Tha' Rayne version in 2002), which debuted on BET's 106 & Park when she was 15 years old. Aiko was set to release her debut album, then-titled My Name Is Jhené in 2003 through Sony, The Ultimate Group, Epic; however, the album was never released due to tension at the record label Epic, which ultimately led to Aiko asking to be released from the label. Aiko later left the aforementioned labels in order to continue her education.

=== 2007–2011: Return to music and Sail Out ===
In 2007, she made a return to music, in an interview she spoke on the choice saying "Shortly before I conceived my daughter, I stepped back into the field and took a meeting with a label head. In this meeting, I was innocently told, to 'sell' myself when walking into these meetings. "That's when I decided I would 'sail' myself rather than sell myself." Aiko released a mixtape on March 16, 2011, titled Sailing Soul(s) via her official website, JheneAiko.com. All the songs on the mixtape were written by her, except "July". The mixtape featured collaborations from Miguel, Drake and Kanye West as well as others. To promote the mixtape Aiko was joined by R&B singer Miguel on a one off free secret performance on Sunday, July 15. On October 21, 2012, Aiko released a music video for the song "My Mine". Aiko also released a video for the mixtape's second track, "Stranger". In 2011, she also began working closely with artists from Carson-based independent record label Top Dawg Entertainment such as Schoolboy Q, Kendrick Lamar, and Ab-Soul. The latter two were featured on her EP released November 12, 2013, titled Sail Out.

=== 2012–2014: Breakthrough and Souled Out ===
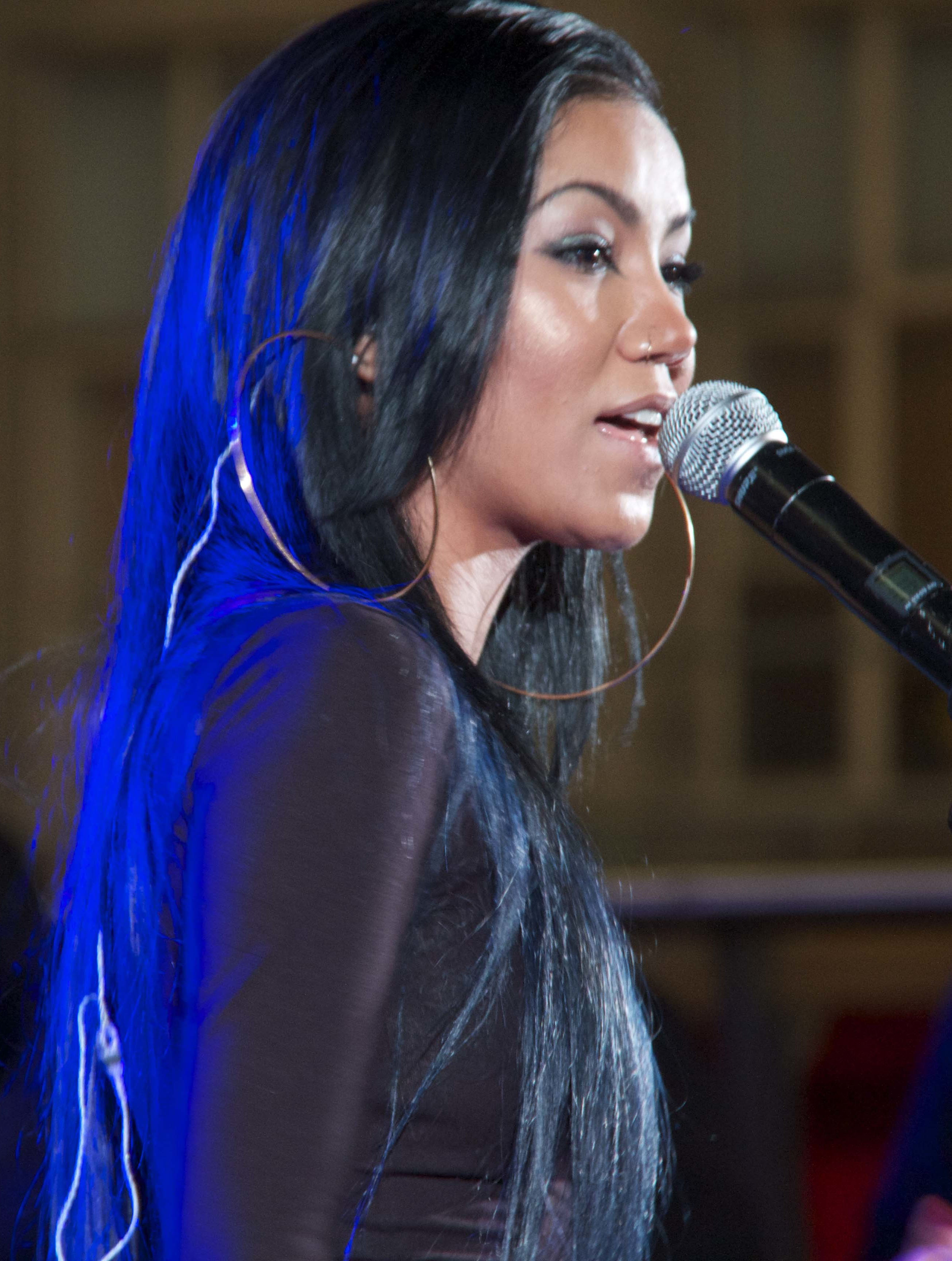
Aiko performing at The Manifesto Year 7 Live at The Square on September 22, 2013 in Toronto, Canada

In 2012, Aiko met with No I.D., record producer and vice president of A&R at Def Jam, who ended up signing Aiko to his Artium Records imprint through Def Jam. Aiko released the track "3:16AM", which was made available for digital download on iTunes September 4, 2012. The song was released as the first single from Sail Out. In 2012, Aiko was also the opening act on the highly anticipated "Life Is Good/Black Rage" concert tour headlined by fellow American artists, rapper Nas and singer-songwriter Lauryn Hill. In June 2013, Aiko was featured on the Big Sean song "Beware", which became her first song to chart on the US Billboard Hot 100. In October 2013, it was revealed Aiko would open for Canadian rapper Drake on his Would You like a Tour? concert tour.

Aiko then released her debut EP, Sail Out, on November 12, 2013. The EP debuted at number eight on the US Billboard 200 chart, with first-week sales of 34,000 copies. On January 14, 2014, "The Worst" was serviced to rhythmic contemporary radio in the United States as the album's third single. On May 2, 2014 "The Worst" rose from three to one on the airplay Mainstream R&B/Hip-Hop, in doing so she became the first female artist to top the chart as a lead with a debut single since Jazmine Sullivan in 2008. The song peaked on the US Billboard Hot 100 at forty-three, becoming Aiko's first solo release to chart in the region, the song also peaked at number eleven on the US Hot R&B/Hip-Hop Songs.

On January 18, 2014, Aiko appeared on Saturday Night Live performing the song "From Time", with the episode's guest host, Drake. In a January 2014 interview with Vibe, Aiko announced her debut studio album, Souled Out, would be released in May 2014. However, the album would be delayed. On March 16, 2014, Aiko premiered a song titled "My Afternoon Dream," produced by Key Wane, along with an accompanying music video directed by Aiko and Krissy. On June 23, 2014, "To Love & Die", was released for digital download as the album's lead single. Following its release "To Love & Die" debuted and peaked at number forty-six on the US Billboard Hot R&B/Hip-Hop charts. On June 26, 2014, Canadian singer-songwriter The Weeknd, announced he would be headlining the "King of the Fall Tour", essentially a mini-tour across America in September / October 2014, the tour will consist of four shows and start on September 19, 2014, in New York, at the Barclays Center and end on October 10 in San Francisco, at the Bill Graham Civic Auditorium. Aiko and frequent collaborator ScHoolboy Q, were confirmed as the tour's supporting acts, respectively.

After three years of recording Aiko released her debut album, Souled Out, on September 8, 2014. An anticipated release, the album was released to commercial and critical success. The album debuted at number three on the US Billboard 200, selling 70,000 copies in its opening week, in doing so the album became that week's second highest debut and doubled the first week sales of Aiko's debut extended play, Sail Out (2013). The album also debuted at number one on the US Top R&B/Hip-Hop Albums and US R&B Albums and has sold 121,012 units in the US. The album produced a further three singles: the album's second single, "The Pressure", was released on iTunes on July 18, 2014. The Pressure debuted at number 25 on the US Hot R&B Songs chart, and peaked the following week, at number 23. "Wading" was released as the album's third single on December 12, 2014, along with an accompanying video, followed by the release of Spotless Mind Her debut album was included on numerous critics' year end lists and was described by Gail Mitchell of Billboard as one of the albums to breakthrough and "make some noise" in the R&B genre. Following the release of the song "Post to Be", a collaboration with Omarion and Chris Brown, her line "I might let your boy chauffeur me, but he gotta eat the booty like groceries" was described as a standout lyric and "the lyric of the summer, or the lyric of the year," by Rob Markman, editor for MTV News.

=== 2015–2018: Twenty88 and Trip ===
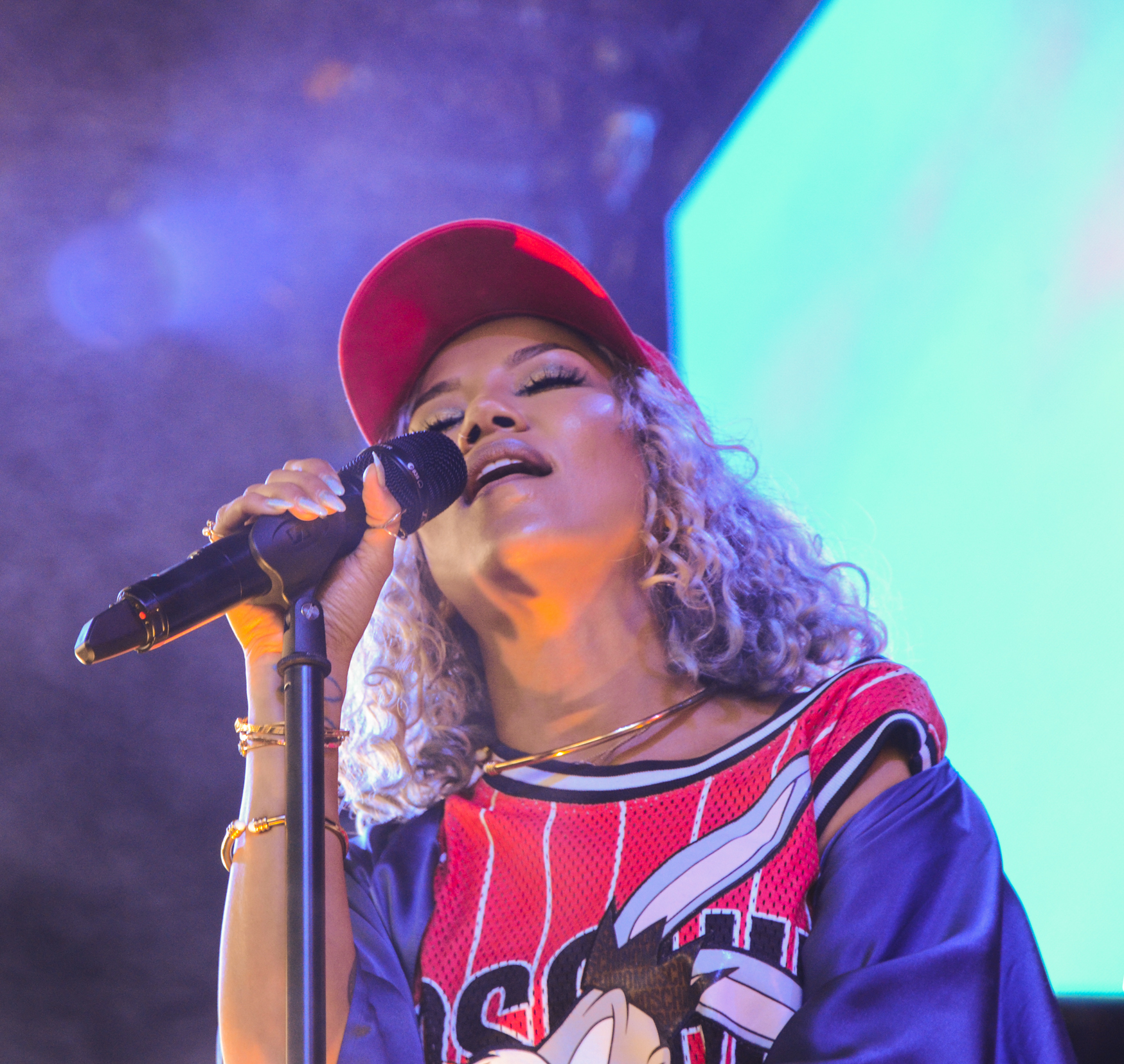
Aiko performing at Molson Canadian Amphitheatre on July 29, 2016 in Toronto, Canada

In February 2015, Aiko was nominated for three Grammy Awards at the 57th Annual Grammy Awards, including Best R&B Song for "The Worst" and Best Urban Contemporary Album for Sail Out. The same month it was announced that Aiko would join rapper J. Cole on his tour entitled, Forest Hills Drive Tour. On March 19, 2015, Aiko released the free song "Living Room Flow." Aiko covered "In a World of My Own / Very Good Advice" from the Disney film Alice in Wonderland, the cover was included on the "We Love Disney" compilation album which was released in October 2015.

In March 2016, Aiko announced a collaboration album with rapper Big Sean, under the name Twenty88, their self-titled debut album was made available to stream exclusively on TIDAL for four days, and was made available for download on April 1. According to the duo, "TWENTY88 tells the story of the highs and lows of a relationship, with insights into conflict, memories, love, sex, and more and features production from Key Wane, Detail, and Tommy Brown." From late 2016 to mid-2017, Aiko released numerous non-album singles such as "Maniac", "First Fuck" with 6lack and "Hello Ego" featuring Chris Brown. The lead single to her second studio album, "While We're Young", was released in June 2016. Aiko's second album, Trip, was released without a prior announcement on September 22, 2017. The lead single, "While We're Young", was released on June 9, 2017, for streaming and digital download. A 23-minute autobiographical film titled after the album was also released a day before Trip on September 21, 2017, co-directed by Aiko. On September 27, 2017, American singer Lana Del Rey revealed that Aiko would be opening for her on select dates of her concert tour entitled the LA to the Moon Tour during January 2018. Aiko toured with Del Rey from January 5 to 13.

=== 2019–present: Chilombo and Westside Whimsy ===
On May 8, 2019, Aiko released "Triggered (Freestyle)", which debuted at number fifty-one on the US Billboard Hot 100 and peaked at number 3 on the US R&B Songs. It is the first official single from her forthcoming 2019 album. The freestyle discussed various topics, including her past relationships. There were immediate rumors that the song might have been addressing Aiko's ex-boyfriend, Big Sean. However, Aiko went on Twitter to dispel the rumors about "Triggered (freestyle)" being a diss track.

Aiko's third studio album, Chilombo, was released in March 2020. On February 13, 2022, she performed America the Beautiful before Super Bowl LVI.

In July 2022, Aiko started the imprint Allel Sound in collaboration with Def Jam records. She signed rapper August 08 and features on the latter's single "Water Sign".

In September 2026, Aiko released Westside Whimsy, her fourth studio album. She is scheduled to embark on the Ark to Agartha tour in North America in 2027 in support of the album. H.E.R., Swae Lee, and Karri will open for the tour.

== Personal life ==
In 2004, at the age of 16, Aiko was baptized at the evangelical Pentecostal Foursquare Church. She dated American R&B singer O'Ryan from 2005 to 2008. Together, they have a daughter, born on November 19, 2008, when Aiko was 20.

Aiko's brother Miyagi died of brain cancer on July 19, 2012. Shortly before his death, he was able to listen to her song "For My Brother", which was recorded on her laptop and initially intended only for him to hear.

On August 27, 2013, Aiko was involved in a car accident in Los Angeles along with her daughter, older sister Miyoko, and her daughter's father O'Ryan. She suffered from a broken wrist, a chipped tooth, and had to get stitches on her chin; however, the other passengers were unharmed.

On March 16, 2016, Aiko and Oladipo "Dot da Genius" Omishore revealed they were married. On August 9, 2016, Aiko filed for divorce from Dot da Genius, citing irreconcilable differences. The divorce was finalized in October 2017.

From 2016 to 2025, Aiko was in an on-again, off-again relationship with rapper Big Sean. Their son Noah was born on November 8, 2022.

Aiko's home burned down during the 2025 Palisades Fire.

== Artistry ==
=== Voice and music ===
Aiko is a soprano. Rap-Up says that she possesses a "sensually sweet voice" while Jim Farber of the New York Daily News describes her voice as having a "feathery tone, sky-high pitch and dazed delivery" that floats "above the beat, sexy and aloof"; Farber has also said that Aiko is "the female answer" to Frank Ocean. Jordan Sargent of Pitchfork Media compared Aiko's vocals to those of R&B singers Cassie, Brandy, Ciara, and the late Aaliyah. Thematically Aiko's work contains direct and "acute" lyrics that can be sometimes "girlish." Adam Fleischer of MTV described Aiko's lyrical content as being "catchy and emotive", continuing to note Aiko's lyrics as having no boundaries; which mix "moments of sensitivity and love, but also moments of confusion and aggression."

Aiko's newfound style lies somewhere between the soothing sounds of Sade and what can be nebulously described as "future R&B," a broad spectrum of pioneering music-makers making tunes best served in the midnight hour, including The Weeknd, Tinashe and FKA twigs.

— Bradley Stern, Time

Aiko's musical style is associated with a new wave of music called alternative R&B, which is described as emerging, stylistic alternative to contemporary R&B. Besides alternative R&B, Aiko explores a variety of genres including psychedelic music, classic R&B and hip hop music. Aiko has described herself as being part of this movement, she noted her own musical style as being "alternative" and a "new-generation R&B", which she compared herself to the style of Frank Ocean, Miguel and Drake. Described by Erin Lowers a reviewer from XXL magazine, Aiko's music is alternative R&B, which the reviewer described as being created with the use of heavily used synthesizers and "wooly drum loops", the reviewer continued to say that her genre is caught in a "revolutionized limbo." Bradley Stern of Time, compared the Aiko's musical style to the work of Sade, calling the album's genre "future R&B", Stern continued to compare her music to the work of The Weeknd, Tinashe and FKA twigs.

Aiko writes music every day, often writing lines or a poem, and begins to add them to melodies. She describes her writing style as "freestyle," where she just says how she is feeling, taking a day or up to a month to complete. Aiko is noted for being an author to her first published book 2Fish(2017).This book contains a collection of poems, songs, and drawings she's created from the age of twelve up to the books publication date. Aiko reveals several lyrical verses in her book that can be found in her album Trip which was released the same year as the publication of 2Fish. During the recording of the album Aiko opted to freestyle when writing the album, she would have a beat or would sit with producers and she would sing a melody until she had words, she described the process as not having a lot written down saying "there's not a lot of writing down—I'll only write it down to make sure it makes sense after I come up with it. For the most part, I like to not have second thoughts." Aiko revealed that whilst writing music she enjoys being high in order to use the feeling as inspiration and that for the entire writing and recording process of her debut mixtape Sailing Soul(s), she was under the influence of cannabis. When writing for her debut studio album, she did the same but recorded while sober. Aiko places great importance on writing her music, believing it defines her as an artist: "After each song I've lost like a piece of me, because I've put it in to (sic) the song." Singer Nick Jonas cited Aiko as an influence during the recording of his debut album, noting her alternative R&B sound as his influence.

=== Influences ===
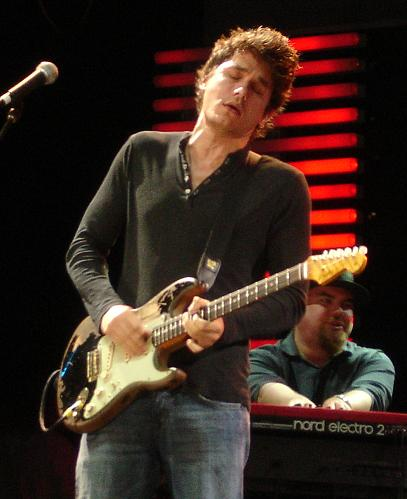
John Mayer is one of Aiko's biggest influences.

Aiko cites American rapper Tupac as a major influence, saying he is "a big inspiration for me just to stick to who I am and to actually stand for something through music" and "an icon for speaking your mind and being you, even if it's controversial." Aiko also cites R&B singer Aaliyah as well as rappers Eminem and Kendrick Lamar as influences. Aiko also calls recording artist Kid Cudi, a major influence, stating Cudi is "pretty much one of the only people that I listen to consistently. No matter what he puts out, I'm one of those fans. He can do no wrong in my eyes."

Aiko also credits Brandy as a major influence, saying, "I always say the person who taught me how to sing indirectly because I listened to her all the time was Brandy. I fell in love with her voice when I was six years old. I always loved Brandy." Aiko also listens to Beyoncé to learn from her vocal technique and is also influenced by India Arie and Amel Larrieux. Aiko is influenced by John Mayer saying "He's probably one of my number one musical influences because of his writing ability and his voice."

During the recording of her debut extended play, Sail Out (2013), Aiko stated she took a large amount of influence from hip-hop and rap music notably the genre's beats. She referenced Janet Jackson, Ciara, and Nicki Minaj as influences on the project. Aiko has stated growing up in a musical family influenced her, noting her siblings bands as an influence, Aiko also cited R&B girl group TLC as an influence when growing up. During the 1990s, she began listening to Alanis Morissette, Fiona Apple, and Lil' Kim, stating her influences were a mixture, following this Aiko began listening to Sade Adu.

== Discography ==
- Souled Out (2014)
- Trip (2017)
- Chilombo (2020)
- Westside Whimsy (2026)

== Tours ==
Headlining

- Enter the Void Tour (2014)
- Trip (The Tour) (2017–2018)
- The Magic Hour Tour (2024)
- Ark to Agartha (2027)

Supporting

- Drake – Would You Like a Tour? (2013)
- The Weeknd – King of the Fall Tour (2014)
- J. Cole – Forest Hills Drive Tour (2015)
- Snoop Dogg and Wiz Khalifa – The High Road Summer Tour (2016)
- Lana Del Rey – LA to the Moon Tour (2018)
- Chris Brown - Breezy Bowl XX (2025)

== Awards and nominations ==
American Music Awards

Year	Nominee / work	Award	Result	Ref.
2014	Herself	Favorite Female Artist- Soul/R&B	Nominated	
2020	Herself	Favorite Female Artist- Soul/R&B	Nominated	

BET Awards

Year	Nominee / work	Award	Result
2014	"The Worst"	Centric Award	Won
2014	"The Worst"	Coca-Cola Viewers' Choice Award	Nominated
2014	Herself	Best Female R&B Artist	Nominated
2015	Herself	Best Female R&B Artist	Nominated
2020	Herself	Best Female R&B Artist	Nominated

Grammy Awards

Year	Nominee / work	Award	Result
2015	"The Worst"	Best R&B Song	Nominated
2015	Sail Out	Best Urban Contemporary Album	Nominated
2015	"Blak Majik" (with Common)	Best Rap/Sung Collaboration	Nominated
2021	Chilombo	Album of the Year	Nominated
2021	Chilombo	Best Progressive R&B Album	Nominated
2021	"Lightning and Thunder" (with John Legend)	Best R&B Performance	Nominated
2025	"Guidance"	Best R&B Performance	Nominated

NAACP Image Awards

Year	Nominee / work	Award	Result	Ref.
2021	Chilombo	Outstanding Album	Won	
2021	"B.S." (feat. H.E.R.)	Outstanding Duo, Group or Collaboration (Contemporary)	Nominated	
2021	"B.S." (feat. H.E.R.)	Outstanding Soul/R&B Song	Nominated	

Soul Train Awards

Year	Nominee / work	Award	Result
2014	"The Worst", Jhené Aiko (Jhené Aiko Chilombo, Mac Robinson, Brian Warfield)	Video of The Year	Nominated
2014	"The Worst", Jhené Aiko (Jhené Aiko Chilombo, Mac Robinson, Brian Warfield)	The Ashford and Simpson Songwriter's Award	Nominated
2014	Herself	Best New Artist	Nominated
2020	Herself	Best R&B/Soul Female Artist	Nominated
2020	Chilombo	Album of the Year	Nominated
