= From Time =

Song by Drake featuring Jhené Aiko

from the album Nothing Was the Same
- Recorded: Metalworks Studios (Mississauga, Ontario); The Yolo Estate (Hidden Hills, California); Fisticuffs Gym (Culver City, California)
- Genre: Hip hop; R&B
- Length: 5:22
- Label: OVO; Young Money; Cash Money; Republic
- Songwriters: Aubrey Graham; Jhené Chilombo; Noah Shebib; Jason Beck
- Producer: Noah "40" Shebib

"From Time" is a song recorded by Canadian recording artist Drake for his third studio album, Nothing Was the Same (2013). The song was written by Drake and its producers Chilly Gonzales and Noah "40" Shebib, while American singer-songwriter Jhené Aiko provided additional vocals and writing. "From Time" is the second collaboration between Drake and Aiko, during which she wrote to the music Drake provided for her.

The resulting production is a slow R&B song, accompanied by a light piano, during which Drake addresses his past relationships with women and his father. "From Time" received critical acclaim from contemporary music critics, who lauded Aiko's guest feature, the song's lyrical content and production. Upon the release of Nothing Was the Same, the song charted in the lower regions of singles charts in France, the United Kingdom and the United States.

== Background ==
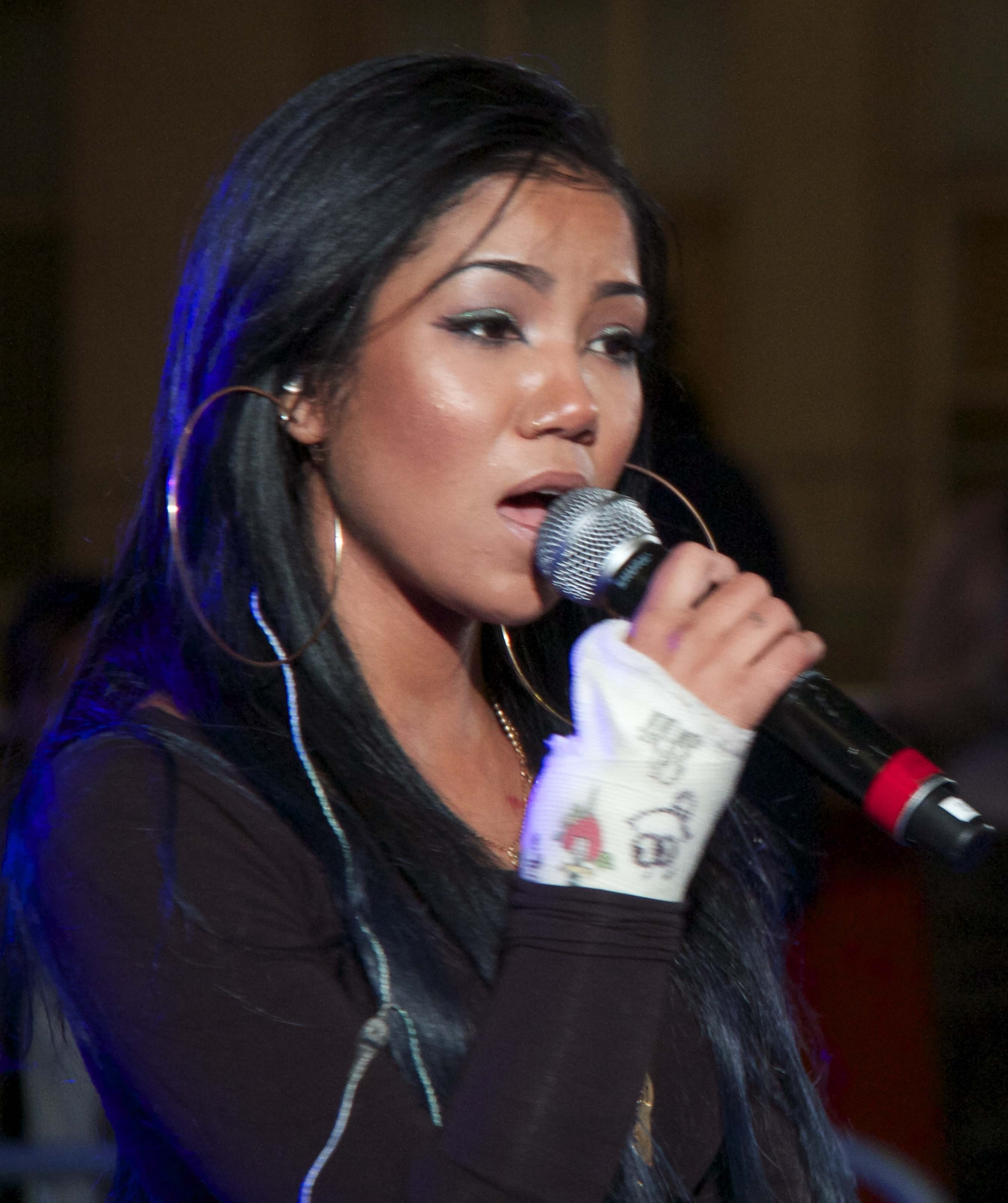
American R&B artist Jhené Aiko provided additional songwriting and vocals to "From Time".

On June 1, 2013, Drake confirmed the first guest appearance on the album as singer Jhené Aiko. Aiko and Drake had previously collaborated on Aiko's "July" for her mixtape Sailing Soul(s) (2011). However, their recording sessions took place at different locations. Drake and Aiko went into the studio to record and he played some beats for Aiko. Enthused by one of the beats, Aiko took it home with her to work on the lyrics to it. She said "I actually wrote like a different song to it. I had it for like a month. And then one day, it was super-specific to me, so I was like "I don't know if he's gonna like... you know I don't know what he would be able to do with that. So... I gave it one more shot and I just sorta like free-styled my whole like, my hook and my verse." Despite initial speculation that the song title would be "Momentous Occasions", Drake denied the title on Twitter, adding "That's a terrible title".

"From Time" was written by Drake, Jhené Aiko, Noah Shebib, and Jason Beck. Production for the song was handled by Shebib under his production moniker "40", who also served as the recording engineer and main instrumentalist. Background vocals were provided by Travis Savoury Baka while the piano featured was played by Chilly Gonzales. The song was mixed by Noel "Gadget" Campbell at Studio 305 in Toronto, Ontario. Recording sessions for the song were orchestrated by Shebib and Noel Cadastre at Metalworks Studios (Mississauga, Ontario) and The Yolo Estate (Hidden Hills, California), with assistance from Travis Sewchan. Aiko's vocals were recorded by Brian Warfield and Christian Plata at Fisticuffs Gym (Culver City, California).

== Composition ==
"From Time" is a slow downtempo R&B song that is composed of finger-snap beats and a piano, the latter provided by Chilly Gonzales. The sound, according to Jesal "Jay Soul" Padania of RapReviews, mirrors the soundscape of Drake's previous album, Take Care (2011). The song's lyrical content has been described as reflective and confessional as it delves into different parts of Drake's life. It begins with Aiko's verse, which towards the end she sings "I love me, I love me enough for the both of us/That's why you trust me, I know you been through more than most of us/So what are you? What are you, what are you so afraid of?/Darling you, you give but you cannot take love", which becomes the hook for the entire track. The song deals with Drake's past relationships with other women. According to Aaron Matthews of Exclaim!, the song "Jhene Aiko deflates Drake's ego while he meditates on selfishness, immaturity and arrogance in past relationships over sumptuous keys." "From Time" also features a reference to a woman named "Courtney from Hooters", who was later discovered to be a waitress at the restaurant and a model. Katie Hasty of HitFix was critical of the mention of his former relationships on the song, calling it petty and accused him "intentionally inflicting his exes and with the same spotlight that so alienates him." It also discusses his fractured relationship with his father, during which he laments about asking for his advice while smoking marijuana and drinking Corona beer.

== Critical reception ==
"From Time" received critical acclaim, with critics lauding it as one of Drake's best tracks. Greg Kot of the Chicago Tribune lauded the song's lyrics and production as a "perfect marriage of words and sonics", while Aaron Matthews of Exclaim! commended the song's writing as the strongest on the album. Nick Cartucci of Entertainment Weekly called the song "real talk of the highest order" and further applauded it as "why no one else can touch him — long as he might for the company." Randall Roberts of Los Angeles Times praised the song's lyrical content as "smart and touching" and classified its production as "liquid." Eric Diep of XXL called "From Time" and "Worst Behaviour" "direct", while Nick Henderson of Tiny Mix Tapes and Jim Carroll of Irish Times labelled "From Time" as a standout track on the album.

Elysa Gardner of USA Today listed it among the tracks to download while stating the song was enhanced by Aiko's soft vocals. James Reed of The Boston Globe wrote that Aiko adds an "airy sophistication" to the track. Jesse Cataldo of Slant Magazine praised Jhené Aiko for enlivening the song while also dismissing the lyrics as "weird' and "robotic". Mike Diver of Clash Music lauded Aiko's vocals, while noting that the song and "Hold On, We're Going Home" provide an "essential contrast" to the album's overall hip-hop soundscape. Andrew Unterburger of Popdust rated "From Time" three and a half stars out of five, praising it a necessary touch of "sweet and sentimental" while lauding Aiko's vocals as a "most welcome sound." Drew Malmuth of Pretty Much Amazing express an opinion similar to Diver's, commenting "The personal details and specific pieces of imagery are welcome in an album that can veer into the overly abstract."

Jesal "Jay Soul" Padania of RapReviews noted its similarities to Drake's previous album Take Care (2011) in terms of sonics and called it "beautifully subdued." Jordan Mainzer of musicOMH said the song "shows not only Drake’s emotional improvement but his lyrical dexterity." Jake Jenkins of Absolute Punk commented that "From Time" and "Worst Behavior" display unforced confidence and vulnerability. Jenkins further wrote that Drake is "painting himself as a complex character with many sides to who he is, which is why the album comes across as such a varied project." American journalist Jody Rosen, writing for New York Magazine's blog Vulture, noted how Drake's lyrics about "money and pussy and vacation" try not to sound boastful by rapping "about his feelings about money and pussy and vacation." Will Lavin of Gigwise dubbed the song the "perfect reminiscent record" while praising the song's setting and chemistry between the artists. Andrew Barker of Variety called the lyrics "incisive" and commented "Drake may tackle more universal themes than many of rap's earlier superstars, but on moments like these he's about as relatable as Kool Keith."

== Credits and personnel ==
Locations

- Recorded at Metalworks Studios in Mississauga, Ontario and The Yolo Estate in Hidden Hills, California
- Jhené's vocals recorded at Fisticuffs Gym in Culver City, California
- Mixed at Studio 305 in Toronto, Ontario

Personnel

- Jhené Aiko – vocals, songwriting
- Travis Savoury Baka – background vocals
- Noel Cadastre – recording engineer
- Noel "Gadget" Campbell – mixing
- Drake – vocals, songwriting
- Chilly Gonzales – songwriting, piano
- Christian Plata – recording engineer
- Travis Sewchan – assistant recording engineer
- Noah "40" Shebib – songwriting, production, recording engineer, instruments
- Brian Warfield – recording engineer

Credits adapted from the liner notes of Nothing Was the Same, OVO Sound, Young Money Entertainment, Cash Money Records, Republic Records.

== Charts ==
Upon the release of Nothing Was the Same, "From Time" appeared on several international charts based on the strength of digital downloads. The song debuted on the UK Singles Chart, dated October 5, 2013, at number 56. The song also debuted on the UK R&B Chart at number 13. In the United States, it entered the Billboard Hot 100 at number 68. The song fell to number 89 before leaving the chart altogether. In France, the song debuted at number 126 on the singles chart.

Chart (2013)	Peak position
France (SNEP)	126
UK Singles (Official Charts Company)	56
UK Hip Hop/R&B (OCC)	13
US Billboard Hot 100	67
US Hot R&B/Hip-Hop Songs (Billboard)	26

== Certifications ==
Region	Certification	Certified units/sales
Denmark (IFPI Danmark)	Gold	45,000^{‡}
New Zealand (RMNZ)	Platinum	30,000^{‡}
United Kingdom (BPI)	Platinum	600,000^{‡}
United States (RIAA)	Platinum	1,000,000^{‡}
^{‡} Sales+streaming figures based on certification alone.
