= Sail Out =

2013 EP by Jhené Aiko

EP by Jhené Aiko
- Released: November 12, 2013
- Recorded: 2012–2013
- Genre: Alternative R&B
- Length: 29:42
- Labels: ARTium; Def Jam
- Producers: No I.D. (also exec.); Kameron Andrews (exec.); Fisticuffs

Jhené Aiko chronology
Sailing Soul(s) (2011)	Sail Out (2013)	Souled Out (2014)

Singles from Sail Out
- 1. "3:16AM" Released: September 4, 2012; 2. "Bed Peace" Released: September 17, 2013; 3. "The Worst" Released: January 14, 2014

Sail Out is the debut extended play (EP) by American singer Jhené Aiko, released on November 12, 2013 through Def Jam Recordings. It was Aiko's first release under the label after leaving her contract with Sony Music in 2003. After leaving Sony Music, Aiko released her first mixtape Sailing Soul(s) (2011), independently; the mixtape featured appearances from well-known artists and was met with generally positive reviews and was nominated for Best Urban Contemporary Album at the 57th Annual Grammy Awards. In 2012, Aiko met with American record producer and vice president of A&R at Def Jam No I.D., who ended up signing Aiko to his Artium Records imprint, through Def Jam.

The writing, recording and producing of the EP began shortly after Aiko was signed to Def Jam in 2012. Most of the album was written by Aiko herself and features production from No I.D. and Fisticuffs, the latter of whom is responsible for producing the majority of Aiko's debut mixtape Sailing Soul(s) (2011). The album features guest appearances from several rappers, such as Kendrick Lamar, Ab-Soul, Childish Gambino and Vince Staples.

Aiko released the track "3:16AM", for digital download on the iTunes Store on September 4, 2012. The song was released as the first single from Sail Out. "Bed Peace" featuring Childish Gambino was released as the album's lead single on September 17, 2013. The single's artwork and music video was inspired by John Lennon and Yoko Ono’s Bed-Ins for Peace protest against the Vietnam War. On January 14, 2014, "The Worst" was serviced to rhythmic contemporary radio in the United States as the album's third single, and peaked at number 43 in April, 2014 on the Billboard Hot 100 chart.

== Background ==
In 2003, Aiko released a video for her debut single "NO L.O.V.E", when she was 15 years old. Aiko was set to release her debut album, then-titled My Name Is Jhené, however the album was never released due to tension at the record label Epic, which ultimately led to Aiko asking to be released from the label. She then began to focus on school and continue her education. Following the birth of her daughter, Aiko began to make her return to music in 2008 and began meeting with labels. In 2011, she released her debut mixtape Sailing Soul(s), which was received well by critics and was certified gold by mixtape-sharing website Datpiff, for downloads of 100,000.

In 2012, Aiko met with No I.D., record producer and vice president of A&R at Def Jam, who ended up signing Aiko to his Artium Records imprint through Def Jam. Aiko spoke on how the meeting came to happen with No I.D. saying "A mutual friend began working with No I.D. He called and said No I.D. wanted to have a meeting with me. He told me he was with Def Jam. The interview was unlike any meeting I had before. He made me feel comfortable. He’s very humble." Aiko revealed that she has signed to Def Jam via her official Twitter account, the tweet consisted of an image of Jhene Akio and No I.D. holding a contract. During an interview Aiko spoke on signing to a label saying “It’s a little different now when the label’s involved, everybody has to be on the same page and the same time line.”

== Recording ==
"Souled Out" will feature production from producer Fisticuffs, who helped produce the majority of Aiko's 2011 mixtape Sailing Soul(s). The album will also feature production from Aiko's mentor No I.D. and Dot da Genius whom has worked with Jhené's idol Kid Cudi. Aiko spoke on meeting with Dot da Genius saying "It was memorable when I met with Dot da Genius because I didn't really know I was going to record, and I ended up having a song that I had in my head that just worked perfectly to his track," she explains. "I was really excited to work with him because I like Kid Cudi, and he works with him, and I was like, 'Oh you know, I'm one step closer.'" Aiko will also be working with producer Key Wane and TDE.

In October 2012, after performing at SOB's in New York City, Aiko revealed to The Singers Room that she is recording a project with No I.D. and the rest of Cocaine 80s and that they would also be featured on her upcoming Def Jam debut, Souled Out: "Me and the Cocaine 80s is made up of musicians, singers and producers. I told them I wanted to be a part of the Cocaine 80s. I wanted to be the female voice of the group. They will be featured on ‘Souled Out’. Yes, we are definitely working on a mixtape or album together. That is definitely in the works. Aiko stated that she was looking forward to working with American artist Kid Cudi saying "It's on my wish list, I'm not gonna say, you know, that he's gonna be on there. One day, maybe", she also revealed that American rapper Big Sean and members of the TDE cats (Kendrick Lamar, Schoolboy Q, Ab-Soul, Jay Rock) may make an appearance on "Souled Out".

During an interview Aiko was asked if rapper Kendrick Lamar in which she replied "You know what, I sure do hope so!" during the interview Aiko also revealed that she had recorded a song with rapper Ab-Soul saying "I have an amazing song with Ab-Soul that’s gonna be on there. Of course they’re all busy so you never know. Definitely I’m pushing for that Kendrick collab though". Aiko revealed that she had been sent many songs for her debut saying "I’ve been getting so many tracks lately and I’m not used to that. I’m used to just having a handful to work with but now that the label (Def Jam) is involved, they’re sending me so much great stuff and I’ve just been writing and writing and writing!" Jhené Aiko also stated that she is working on the album everyday either recording or writing, but is taking her time as she doesn't want "to put out some nonsense".

== Composition ==
“Sail Out has a lot of the hip-hop/rap influence on it, even with the beats. It’s something you wanna put in your car.”

— Jhene, speaking on the EP's sound

In 2013 Aiko revealed her alter ego known as J.Hennessy, her alter ego first appeared on her debut extended play "Sail Out". Aiko spoke about her alter ego saying she experiences twelve "different personalities in my head" every day, Aiko continued to say “She’s an aspiring rapper. She still sings, but she’s more aggressive. She likes to really talk a lot of shit and talk about things that a lot of R&B singers don’t talk about.”

"Bed Peace" is an R&B song featuring American rapper Childish Gambino, the song's lyrics feature Aiko singing about smoking marijuana and having sex, as she describes her ideal day. The Worst is an R&B song that lyrically discusses Aiko falling in love with someone she shouldn't. The song was compared to the work of Sade due to Aiko's use of "ethereal, Japanese-inflected phrasing" along with the songs "impassioned streetwise rap."

3:16, is a song that last for a duration of three minutes and sixteen seconds that lyrically speaks about "addiction, not just drugs, addiction to anything that you go to when you’re in your darkest place and I think everyone can relate to that. We’ve all been to hell and back and that’s pretty much what 3:16 is all about: going to hell and back". "Comfort Inn Ending (Freestyle),"features "large swaths" and introspective lyrics that mix between rap and jazz-style scat.

== Release and promotion ==
Aiko released Sail Out as a bridge between her debut mixtape and debut studio album saying, "It’s like bridging the gap between [my mixtape] Sailing Soul(s) and Souled Out." The EP was released on November 12, 2013 with an iTunes pre-order beginning October 29. On October 22, 2012 Jhené Aiko performed at the SOB's Friday night in which she performed songs from her mixtape Sailing Soul(s) (2011) such as “Higher” and “Space Jam,” Aiko also debuted a new song from the album entitled "What a Life".

In 2012, Aiko was also the opening act on the highly anticipated “Life Is Good/Black Rage” concert tour headlined by fellow American artists, rapper Nas and singer-songwriter Lauryn Hill. To promote the EP and The Worst Aiko performed it live on various occasions, on January 18, 2014 she performed the song on “Late Night with Jimmy Fallon,” accompanied by The Roots, the performance was described as "emotional" by online publication Rap-Up. On January 22, 2014 she performed the song at BBC Radio 1's Future Festival in Maida Vale, London along with her band wearing a flowy white dress.

The following month on February 13, Aiko performed the song on Conan. On May 27, 2014 Aiko performed the single on the “Ellen DeGeneres Show, the performance featured the lights turned low, and Aiko barefoot. On July 22, 2014 Aiko released a video of her preparing to go on tour and rehearsals, during the video she sang an acoustic rendition of the song along with her guitarist Jeff, during the video Aiko also performed “Stay Ready (What a Life)” and "To Love & Die".

== Singles ==
Aiko released the track "3:16AM", for digital download on the iTunes Store on September 4, 2012. The song was released as the first single from Sail Out. "Bed Peace" featuring Childish Gambino was released as the album's lead single on September 17, 2013. On January 14, 2014, "The Worst" was serviced to rhythmic contemporary radio in the United States as the album's third single. On May 2, 2014 "The Worst" rose from three to one on the airplay Mainstream R&B/Hip-Hop, in doing so she became the first female artist to top the chart as a lead with a debut single since Jazmine Sullivan reached the same feat with "Need U Bad" in 2008. The Worst also rose forty seven to forty three on the Hot 100. The song peaked on the US Billboard Hot 100 at forty-three, becoming Aiko's first solo release to chart in the region, the song also peaked at number eleven on the US Hot R&B/Hip-Hop Songs

== Critical reception ==
Professional ratings
Aggregate scores
Source	Rating
Metacritic	69/100
Review scores
Source	Rating
AllMusic	3.5/5 stars
Consequence of Sound	3/5 stars
Daily News	2/5 stars
Exclaim!	5/10
HipHopDX	3.5/5 stars
NOW	NNNN
Pitchfork	6.1/10

Sail Out was generally well received by critics. According to the review aggregator Metacritic, Sail Out received "generally favorable reviews" based on a weighted average score of 69 out of 100 from 9 critic scores. The New York Daily News gave the EP two out of five stars, praising Aiko's vocals calling them a "feathery tone, sky-high pitch and dazed delivery, she floats above the beat, sexy and aloof". They also compared the album to the work of Kanye West, Kid Cudi, Drake, Future and Frank Ocean. It called the EP "the female answer" to Frank Ocean, however they said the EP "lapse into dullness so early, it won’t be long before it’s the listener, not Aiko, who drifts away."

== Commercial performance ==
Sail Out debuted at number eight on the US Billboard 200 chart, with first-week sales of 34,000 copies in the United States. In its second week, the album dropped to number 30 on the chart, selling 12,000 copies bringing its total album sales to 46,000 copies. As of December 2014, the EP has sold 283,000 copies in the United States. On June 16, 2016, the album was certified gold by the Recording Industry Association of America (RIAA) for selling over 500,000 copies in the United States.

In 2014, Sail Out was ranked as the 66th most popular album of the year on the Billboard 200.

== Track listing ==
Tracklist revealed on Aiko's Tumblr.

No.	Title	Writer(s)	Producer(s)	Length
1.	"The Vapors" (featuring Vince Staples)	Jhené Chilombo; Vince Staples; Mac Robinson; Brian Warfield; Robert Hume	Fisticuffs	3:30
2.	"Bed Peace" (featuring Childish Gambino)	Chilombo; Donald Glover; Robinson; Warfield	Fisticuffs	4:16
3.	"Stay Ready (What a Life)" (featuring Kendrick Lamar)	Chilombo; Kendrick Duckworth; Robinson; Warfield	Fisticuffs	6:22
4.	"WTH" (featuring Ab-Soul)	Chilombo; Herbert Stevens; Robinson; Warfield	Fisticuffs	3:19
5.	"The Worst"	Chilombo; Robinson; Warfield	Fisticuffs	4:14
6.	"3:16AM"	Chilombo; Robinson; Warfield	Fisticuffs	3:20
7.	"Comfort Inn Ending (Freestyle)" (bonus track)	Chilombo	No I.D.	5:21
Total length:				29:42

== Personnel ==
Credits for Sail Out adapted from AllMusic.

- Ab-Soul - Featured Artist
- Jhené Aiko - Primary Artist
- Derek "MixedByAli" Ali - Engineer
- Ron Avant - Keyboards
- Leesa D. Brunson - A&R
- Jim Caruana - Engineer, Mixing
- Childish Gambino - Featured Artist
- Jhené Chilombo - Art Direction, Composer, Creative Director
- Tyrone Davis - A&R
- Doc Allison - Cello
- Kendrick Lamar Duckworth - Composer
- Donald Glover - Composer
- Maximilian Jaeger - Mixing Assistant
- Jaycen Joshua - Mixing
- Ryan Kaul - Mixing Assistant
- Ketrina 'Taz' Askew - Executive Producer
- Rob Kinelski - Mixing
- Dave Kutch - Mastering
- Kendrick Lamar - Featured Artist
- Chris Le - Cover Design
- Tai Linzie - Art Producer
- Michael "Mic West" Lloreda - Keyboards
- Sam Martin - Mixing Assistant
- Eric Neuser - Package Production
- No I.D. - A&R, Executive Producer, Producer
- Christian Plata - Engineer
- Noah Preston - A&R
- Akinah Rahmaan - Marketing
- Mac Robinson - Composer
- Donnie Scantz - Engineer
- Vince Staples - Composer, Featured Artist
- Herbert Stevens - Composer
- Michael Thomas - Engineer, Mixing
- Keith Tucker - A&R
- Brian Warfield - Composer
- Dawud West - Package Design
- Milli Moto - Photography

== Charts ==
=== Weekly charts ===
Chart (2013)	Peak position
US Billboard 200	8
US Top R&B/Hip-Hop Albums (Billboard)	2

=== Year-end charts ===
Chart (2014)	Position
US Billboard 200	66
US Top R&B/Hip-Hop Albums (Billboard)	15

== Certifications ==
Region	Certification	Certified units/sales
New Zealand (RMNZ)	Gold	7,500^{‡}
United Kingdom (BPI)	Gold	100,000^{‡}
United States (RIAA)	Gold	500,000^{‡}
^{‡} Sales+streaming figures based on certification alone.

== Release history ==
Date	Format	Label
November 11, 2013	Digital Download, CD	Def Jam

== See also ==
- PBR&B
