= Beware (Big Sean song) =

Single by Big Sean featuring Lil Wayne and Jhené Aiko

from the album Hall of Fame
- Released: June 25, 2013
- Genre: Hip hop
- Length: 3:57
- Label: GOOD; Def Jam
- Songwriters: Sean Anderson; Dwayne Carter; Dwane Weir II; Alexander Izquierdo
- Producers: Key Wane; Mike Dean

Big Sean singles chronology
"Wild" (2013)	"Beware" (2013)	"Right There" (2013)

Lil Wayne singles chronology
"We Outchea" (2013)	"Beware" (2013)	"Good Time" (2013)

Jhené Aiko singles chronology
"3:16AM" (2012)	"Beware" (2013)	"Bed Peace" (2013)

"Beware" is a song by American hip hop rapper Big Sean taken from his second studio album Hall of Fame (2013). "Beware" was released on June 25, 2013, as the album's third single, through GOOD and Def Jam. The song was written by Sean Anderson, Dwayne Carter, Dwane Weir II, and Alexander Izquierdo, while production was handled by frequent collaborator Key Wane and Mike Dean and features guest appearances from fellow rapper Lil Wayne and singer Jhené Aiko.

Musically "Beware" is a hip hop song, backed by "poppy" and "head-bobbing" production, with lyrics that revolve around themes of infidelity and breaking up. Upon release "Beware" was met with generally positive reviews from music critics; who praised the song's musical direction and the inclusion of Jhené Aiko. Commercially the song fared well reaching the top forty of US Billboard Hot 100 and the top ten of the US Hot R&B/Hip-Hop Songs chart, since its release the song has been certified double platinum by the Recording Industry Association of America.

An accompanying music video was directed by Matthew Williams and premiered on August 16, 2013, on Vevo, the video was later named one of "The 15 Best Hip-Hop Videos Of The Summer" by XXL. To further promote the song Sean performed at live on various inclusion including Jimmy Kimmel Live and the Hustle After Party.

== Background ==
"Beware" was officially premiered through SoundCloud on June 24, 2013, after announcing the track a day earlier. The track was released for digital download on June 25, 2013, as the album's third single, through GOOD Music and Def Jam Recordings.

The lyrics depict relationship tensions between a male and female. The themes of infidelity and breaking up are steered away from in Hall of Fame, making it the only piece on the album to focus on relationships. Both Key Wane and Mike Dean produced the beat which helps utilize the piece's tone. The beat was described as "poppy" and "head-bobbing" by James Shotwell, writer for Spin Media's Under the Gun Review. He also said that it blends well with the three vocalists. "Beware" contains an interpolation of "Ain't No Woman (Like the One I've Got)" written by Dennis Lambert and Brian Potter.

== Critical reception ==
Upon release "Beware" was met with generally positive reviews from music critics. David Turner of Spin magazine praised the song and Big Sean for abounding the norm of hip-hop and moving away from "glossy resilience," Turner continued to commend Sean's choice to focus on "relationship tensions." A reviewer from the BoomBox praised Sean's choice to include Jhene Aiko as a feature and praised her on the "infectious chorus" from Aiko, the reviewer also praised Sean's choice to make a "radio friendly" song as well as praising Lil Wayne's verse.

== Music video ==
The music video was directed by Matthew Williams from Kanye West creative company DONDA and premiered on August 16, 2013, on Vevo. The described "trippy" music video was named one of "The 15 Best Hip-Hop Videos Of The Summer" by XXL. During an interview with Rap Up TV Sean described the concept behind the music video stating he wanted to have a video that was cohesive with the single's artwork, as well as the album's other artworks and videos, Sean continued to say;

“It's been great working with DONDA because they're somebody who is really trying to elevate artistry, elevate artists, put them on a new level of creativity,” I think they've done that for me, from the ‘Beware’ video to the ‘Fire’ video. I'm proud of the video. It took a while to get done, but the end result is good. It's cool to put out great videos that I can really be proud of.”

== Charts ==
=== Weekly charts ===
Chart (2013)	Peak position
UK Hip Hop/R&B (Official Charts)	28
UK Singles (Official Charts Company)	183
US Billboard Hot 100	38
US Hot R&B/Hip-Hop Songs (Billboard)	10
US Hot Rap Songs (Billboard)	7
US Rhythmic Airplay (Billboard)	3

=== Year-end charts ===
Chart (2013)	Position
US Hot R&B/Hip-Hop Songs (Billboard)	40
US Rap Songs (Billboard)	33
US Rhythmic (Billboard)	29

== Certifications ==
Region	Certification	Certified units/sales
Brazil (Pro-Música Brasil)	Gold	30,000^{‡}
New Zealand (RMNZ)	Platinum	30,000^{‡}
United Kingdom (BPI)	Silver	200,000^{‡}
United States (RIAA)	4× Platinum	4,000,000^{‡}
^{‡} Sales+streaming figures based on certification alone.

== Radio and release history ==
Country	Date	Format	Label
United States	June 25, 2013	Digital download	GOOD, Def Jam
United States	July 9, 2013	Rhythmic contemporary radio	GOOD, Def Jam
United States	October 15, 2013	Mainstream radio	GOOD, Def Jam
