= O'Ryan (singer) =

American singer (born 1987)

O'Ryan Omri Browner (born February 12, 1987) is an American R&B singer. He is also the younger brother of R&B singer Omarion. In 2004, he released a self-titled album aimed at the teen pop audience.

== Personal life ==
Browner dated American singer Jhené Aiko from 2005 to 2008. Together, they have a daughter, born on November 19, 2008.

== Discography ==
=== Albums ===
Year	Title	Chart positions	
Year	Title	US	US R&B
2004	O'Ryan: Released: October 19, 2004; Label: TUG, Universal Motown	75	21

=== Singles ===
Year	Song	Chart positions		Album
Year	Song	US	US R&B	Album
2004	"Take It Slow"	—	110	O'Ryan
2010	"America's Most Wanted" (featuring Tank)	—	—	Ocean's O
