= Sailing Soul(s) =

Mixtape by Jhené Aiko
- Released: March 16, 2011
- Recorded: 2008–2010
- Genres: Alternative R&B; neo soul
- Length: 41:37 (2011 version); 50:01 (2021 version)
- Labels: Self-released (2011 version); Def Jam (2021 version)
- Producers: K. Roosevelt; Fisticuffs; J.LBS; Bei Maejor; Tae Beast; Key Wane

Jhené Aiko chronology
Sailing Soul(s) (2011)	Sail Out (2013)

Sailing Soul(s) is the debut mixtape by American singer-songwriter Jhené Aiko. It was originally released on March 16, 2011, and later re-released through Def Jam for streaming platforms on March 12, 2021. Aiko began working on the mixtape after she gave birth to her daughter. Aiko wrote all the mixtape's songs except "July," which was written by Micah Powell. Most songs on the mixtape were produced by Fisticuffs, except "July" and "You vs Them" which were produced by Bei Maejor, "Real Now" which was produced by Roosevelt, "Do Better" which was produced by J. Lbs and “Growing Apart Too” which was produced by Tae Beast. The mixtape featured several guest vocalists, including Miguel, Drake, Gucci Mane, Kanye West, and Kendrick Lamar as well as others.

Critically, the mixtape received positive reviews, with reviewers saying that the mixtape was one of the "freshest", another reviewer said that the mixtape is making "noise in the R&B spectrum". The concept follows the story of Aiko having a meeting with a label and she was told by people at the label "I love everything but when you come into these meetings you have to sell yourself." After the meeting Jhene came up with the concept "I’m not a slave to anyone; I’m sailing my soul instead of selling it."

To promote the mixtape Aiko was joined by Grammy-nominated R&B singer Miguel on a one off free secret tour on Sunday, July 15. The free tickets were given away at the Key Club box office on July 6 from 11AM-5PM on a first-come, first-served basis while. The concert started 7:00pm and finished at 9:30pm, lasting a duration of two and a half hours. On October 21, 2012 Aiko released a music video for the song "My Mine". Jhene also released a video for the mixtapes second track "Stranger". Datpiff certified the mixtape Platinum with downloads of 300,000 and an additional 31,000 downloads from MixtapeMonkey.com.

== Background and concept ==
In 2002, Jhené made her musical beginning when she featured on several B2K songs from their album B2K: The Remixes - Volume 1. She released a video for her single "NO L.O.V.E" which debuted on BET 106 & Park when she was 15 years old. Jhene was set to release her self-titled debut album but the album was never released due to tension at the record label Epic, in which Aiko asked to be released from the label. Aiko then began to focus on school. Later at the age of 20, Aiko became pregnant by American R&B singer O'Ryan and gave birth to a baby girl named Namiko Love Browner on 19 November 2008.

Six months after Aiko gave birth to her daughter she began to work on the mixtape. This period of Aiko's life was turbulent with the singer stating "At the time I was going through so much in my life that it was so easy to write the songs. I had just had a baby and I was dealing with baby father issues and I had a boyfriend. The songs were just coming and coming. I just had so much to say, and when I was signed, I never really got a chance to write my own music. I always wanted to do a mixtape and before I got pregnant I was about to get back into it ‘cause I was working with different producers and things like that. Fisticuffs, who produced the majority of sailing soul(s), I’ve known them for a while and worked with them on different projects. So yeah, the concepts were just coming and it only took about nine months to complete".

All the songs on the mixtape were written by Aiko, except “July” which was written by Micah Powell and most of the songs were produced by Fisticuffs, except “July” and “You vs Them” which were produced by Bei Maejor, “Real Now” which was produced by Roosevelt, “Do Better” which was produced by J. Lbs and “Growing Apart” which was produced by Tae Beast. The album's artwork was shot by photographer Jay 3. The mixtape also features collaborations from Miguel, Drake and Kanye West as well as others. In 2011, she also began working closely with artists from Carson-based independent record label Top Dawg Entertainment.

The mixtape's concept and title was based on a meeting, Aiko had with a label head, shortly before she found out she was pregnant. Aiko's voice was praised, but was told during the meeting she needed to "sell yourself". Jhené tweeted the word "sailing souls" on twitter in a mishap, however the name stuck. Explaining the mixtape's title during an interview with Vibe Magazine, Jhené says "it just means to stay true to yourself and go with what you feel. Don’t ever lose yourself for whatever reason—because you want to make more money, because you want to be prettier or whatever. I’m not a slave to anyone; I’m sailing my soul instead of selling it."

== Music and lyrics ==
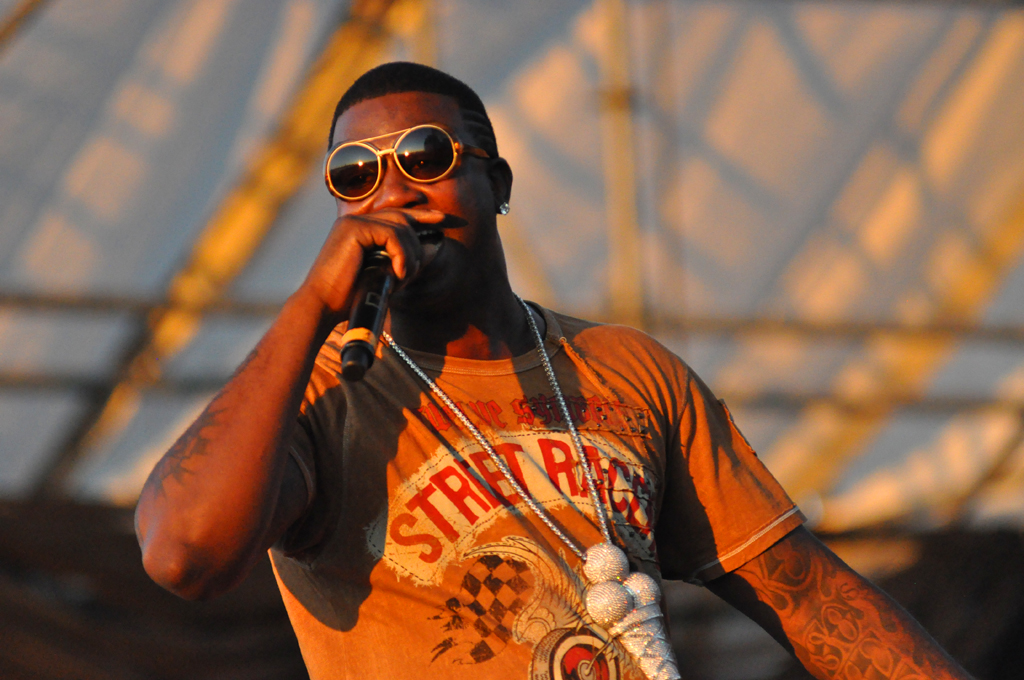
Gucci Mane (left) featured on the song "Hoe".

In an interview Aiko described the music and her style on the mixtape, saying "Honestly, I don't think it fits in and I think that's why it stands out. It's about what I'm saying. It's a marriage [with] real music. Fisticuffs, they don't use any samples and they use live instruments a lot of the times in their beats, so I would go in there and I would be singing and they would be making the track. It was like a complete marriage of sound. I wouldn't write anything down, just sing it on the mic and come up with everything off the top of my head. I feel like it doesn't have to sound like anything that's on the radio to be good music".

Sailing Soul(s)' opening track last for a duration of eight-second which features a "sped up, reversed intro", that then is followed by the album's second song "Stranger", which lyrically talks of a "woman going through similar issues of the heart, but seemingly with different men". "Hoe" is produced by Fisticuffs, and features a "steady drum beat", the song also includes guest vocals from Miguel and Gucci Mane. The fourth track "July", features vocals from rapper Drake, which has "a lighter feel on production and a simple, repetitive piano chord". “My Mine,” used the topic Cannabis as metaphor for love.

"Sailing Not Selling", featuring a verse from Kanye West, lyrically the song "attack a hot topic in music right now". "Do Better Blues", which was produced by J.LBS talks about "the fearful truth to an ex, saying she is probably NOT better off without him". “Higher” is described as a crazy, "sexy, cool song" with suggestive lyrics in regards to Cannabis, “Break me down/Roll me up/Boy I can be your pipe dream”. “You vs. Them,” is described as "hauntingly beautiful song", that lyrically describes "the apprehension of getting into a relationship, of which, she may be referring to a person or God". "Space Jam" Aiko wrote on the subject of when she found out her brother had been diagnosed with cancer.

== Track listing ==
Sailing Soul(s) original track listing
No.	Title	Writer(s)	Producer(s)	Length
1.	"The Beginning"	Jhené Aiko	Fisticuffs	0:09
2.	"Stranger"	Aiko; Birdsong	Fisticuffs	3:35
3.	"Hoe" (featuring Miguel and Gucci Mane)	Aiko; Miguel Pimentel; Radric Davis	Fisticuffs	3:38
4.	"July" (featuring Drake)	Micah Powell; Aubrey Graham	Bei Maejor	3:59
5.	"My Mine"	Aiko	Fisticuffs	4:02
6.	"Popular"	Aiko	Fisticuffs	2:58
7.	"Real Now" (featuring Dominik, HOPE and K. Roosevelt)	Aiko; Marquis Wright; Kevin Roosevelt Moore II	K. Roosevelt	4:21
8.	"Sailing Not Selling" (featuring Kanye West)	Aiko; Kanye West	Fisticuffs	3:01
9.	"Do Better Blues" (featuring HOPE)	Aiko; Wright	J.LBS	4:14
10.	"Higher"	Aiko	Fisticuffs	3:52
11.	"You vs Them"	Aiko; Birdsong	Bei Maejor	3:25
12.	"Space Jam"	Aiko	Fisticuffs	2:59
13.	"Growing Apart Too" (featuring Kendrick Lamar and HOPE)	Aiko; Kendrick Duckworth; Wright	Tae Beast	3:24
Total length:				41:37

Sailing Soul(s) 2021 version track listing
No.	Title	Writer(s)	Producer(s)	Length
1.	"The Beginning"	Jhené Aiko	Fisticuffs	0:09
2.	"Stranger"	Aiko; Birdsong	Fisticuffs	3:34
3.	"Hoe" (featuring Miguel and Gucci Mane)	Aiko; Miguel Pimentel; Radric Davis	Fisticuffs	3:37
4.	"My Mine"	Aiko	Fisticuffs	4:01
5.	"Popular"	Aiko	Fisticuffs	2:58
6.	"Real Now" (featuring Dominik, HOPE and K. Roosevelt)	Aiko; Marquis Wright; Kevin Roosevelt Moore II	K. Roosevelt	4:20
7.	"Sailing Not Selling"	Aiko	Fisticuffs	2:08
8.	"Do Better Blues" (featuring HOPE)	Aiko; Wright	J.LBS	4:13
9.	"Higher"	Aiko	Fisticuffs	3:51
10.	"You vs Them"	Aiko; Birdsong	Bei Maejor	3:25
11.	"Space Jam"	Aiko	Fisticuffs	3:00
12.	"Living Room Flow"	Aiko; Maclean Robinson	Fisticuffs	4:22
13.	"Mirrors"	Aiko	Key Wane	3:52
14.	"2 Seconds"	Aiko; Kevin Roosevelt Moore II	K. Roosevelt	2:32
15.	"Snapped"	Aiko; Kevin Roosevelt Moore II	K. Roosevelt	3:51
Total length:				50:01

Notes

- All track titles are stylized in all lowercase, except "Sailing Not Selling", which is stylized as "sailing NOT selling".

Sampling credits

- "Hoe" contains a sample of Gucci Mane's vocals from "Pretty Girls" as performed with Wale and Weensey.
- "Popular" contains a sample of "Wanksta" as performed by 50 Cent.
- "Sailing Not Selling" contains a sample of Kanye West's vocals from an acapella performance of "Eyez Closed" as performed with Snoop Dogg and John Legend.
- "Do Better Blues" contains a sample of "Hello Like Before", as performed by Bill Withers.

== Charts ==
Chart performance for Sailing Soul(s)
Chart (2021)	Peak position
US Billboard 200	180

== Release history ==
Release history for Sailing Soul(s)
Region	Date	Format	Label
Various	March 16, 2011	Online / Digital download	Independent
Various	March 12, 2021	Streaming / Digital download	Def Jam, Universal Music
