= Triggered (Freestyle) =

Single by Jhené Aiko

from the album Chilombo
- Released: May 8, 2019
- Length: 3:31
- Label: Def Jam
- Songwriters: Brian Keith Warfield; Jhené Aiko Chilombo; Julian-Quan Viet Le; Maclean Robinson; Ross James
- Producers: Fisticuffs; Julian-Quan Viet Le

Jhené Aiko singles chronology
"Never Call Me" (2018)	"Triggered (Freestyle)" (2019)	"None of Your Concern" (2019)

"Triggered (Freestyle)" is a song by American singer Jhené Aiko, released as a single on May 8, 2019, through Def Jam Recordings. Written by Aiko, Ross James. Maclean Robinson, Brian K. Warfield and Julian-Quán Việt Lê. The song is a freestyle rap about Aiko's conflicted feelings following a breakup, in which she sings: "Knew from the beginning, you'd ruin everything you do it every time, you are my enemy, you are no friend of mine." The song was interpreted as a diss track towards Aiko's ex-boyfriend Big Sean, with whom she formed the duo Twenty88, although she denied this, saying: "triggered is NOT a diss song. it is a moment of talking shit out of frustration and passion."

The song debuted at number 51 on the Billboard Hot 100 a week after its release, spending four weeks on the chart altogether. The song was also ranked at number 1 in Associated Press's 10 Best Songs of 2019 year-end list.

== Background and composition ==
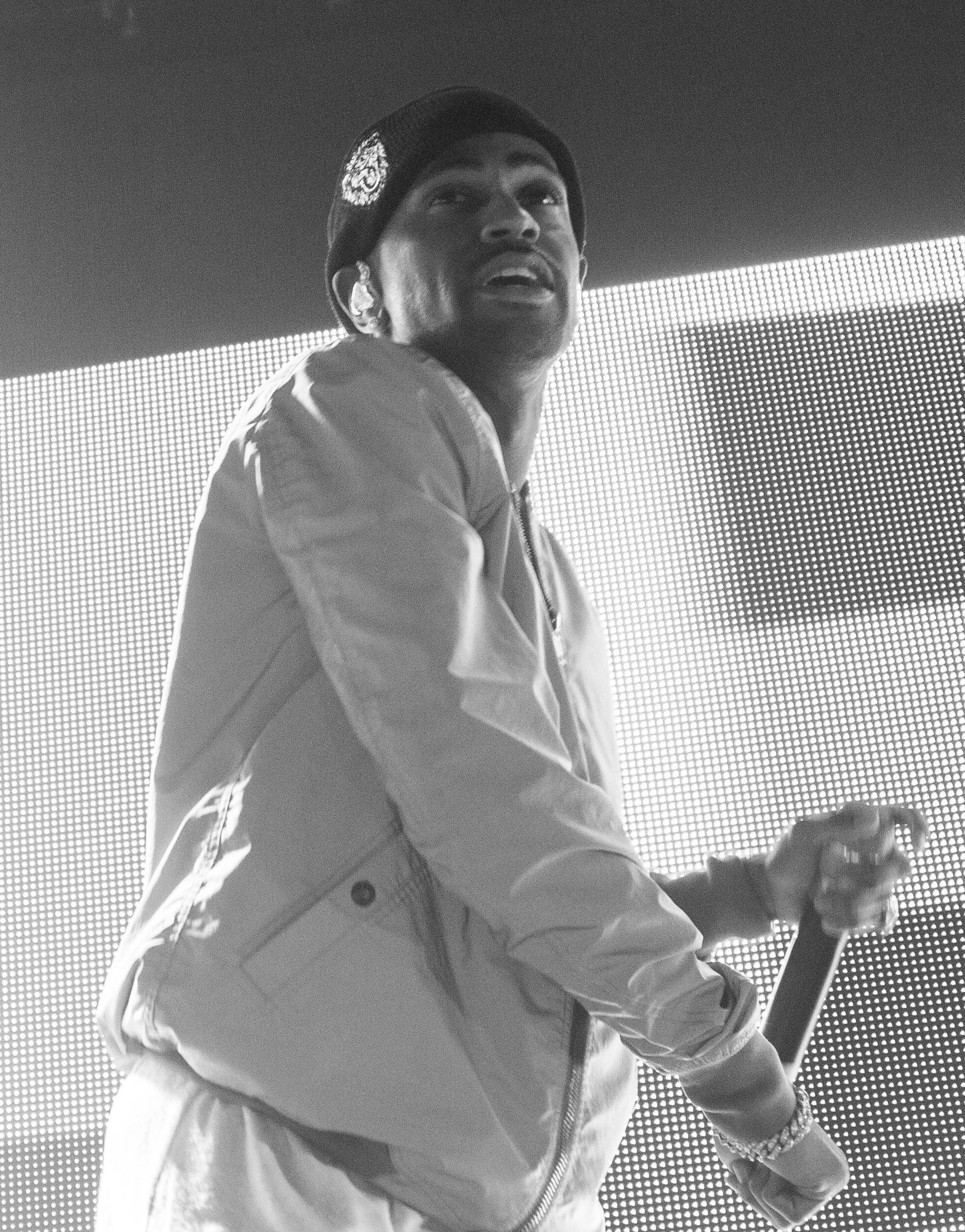
The release of "Triggered" generated social media speculation that Aiko's lyrics were aimed at her ex, Detroit rapper Big Sean (pictured).

"Triggered (Freestyle)" was written by Jhené Aiko, Ross James. Maclean Robinson, Brian K. Warfield and Julian-Quán Việt Lê, who also co-produced the song alongside Fisticuffs. Musically, "Triggered" has been described as an emotional ballad with a length of three minutes and thirty-one seconds. The confessional freestyle rap finds Aiko pouring her soul out about a doomed relationship. The song was dropped nearly one month after Aiko shared a heartfelt message to Big Sean on Instagram. In the post, she talked about her love for the Big Sean and how he tends to "trigger" her emotions.

Aiko accompanied the song's release with a note revealing the intense emotions that sparked the tune.

"One night I was so deep in my feelings, I was afraid of what I might do. I didn't want to revert to the same bad habits that have set me back time and time again. I realized that instead of running away from my emotions... I needed to sit with them, express myself and say whatever came to mind. it was healing to say the least... and now I feel a bit more free."

Speaking to Essence, Aiko explained that his initial reaction was surprise. "He was just like, 'Wow, I'm not your friend.' I was like, 'Well, I was feeling that in the moment. This is just a song. This is not 100% about you,'" she said. Aiko added: "I feel like, especially because we have a personal relationship, and a true friendship, that's why I could play it for him, and be like, 'Yeah, sorry. I kind of went really hard, but don't think that this is a personal letter to you.'"

== Critical reception ==
The song received critical acclaim. Michael Saponara of Billboard called "Triggered" an "emotive freestyle". Soundigest's Kiku Gross praised the song's emotional direction and said, "The juxtaposition of the sweet song and the fierce lyrics is what sells this song. It’s rare to hear a woman be mad, and in a genuine way. Aiko isn’t just upset, she’s honestly laying out feelings of betrayal, of anger, and of hurt." Furthermore, Gross felt that Aiko’s earnest delivery of the song undercuts a lot of the more "intense" lyricism. Gross also complimented Aiko's musical style and called the song "impressively sweet" for how intense it is.

Many critics felt that the song was about Aiko and Big Sean's break-up. Peter Helman of Stereogum said that the song was a "sensual meditation on the swirl of bitterness and loneliness that follows a breakup" and pointed out how the song's lyrics felt similar to Aiko's relationship and break-up with Big Sean. Alyssa Norwin of Hollywood Life also felt the song was related Aiko's relationship with Big Sean, and added, "The scathing lyrics are quite shocking, considering Jhene just left Sean a sweet comment on Instagram last month". Writing for The Fader, David Renshaw said that "Triggered" takes the form of a freestyle in which she opens up about her confused feelings following a split.

Trey Alston of MTV News commented, "Aiko returns to her soft world of cerulean waterfalls and perennial showers on 'Triggered.' But while Aiko treads familiar, heavenly realms with her atmosphere, her words bring death by a thousand cuts. She flares her reptilian nostrils at an ex-lover while smoke clouds continuously form. "You'd ruin everything, you do it every time / You are my enemy, you are no friend of mine," she sings, adding "motherfucker" at the end like a final, twisting cut to the aorta. "Don't know what I'm capable of / Might fuck around and go crazy on cuz," she continues. "Might fuck around, have to pay me in blood."

Associated Press ranked "Triggered (Freestyle)" at number 1 on its year-end list of the 10 best songs of 2019. Pitchfork ranked the song at number 65 on its year-end list of the 100 best songs of 2019.

== Music video and promotion ==
On May 7, 2019, the single's accompanying music video premiered via YouTube. It was uploaded a day after Aiko posted two blurred photos of her standing and sitting on a canyon via her Instagram account. The three-minute video shows Aiko standing atop a massive canyon. She appears to be staring straight ahead as if she were addressing her ex-lover face-to-face. A vertical video for the song was posted on YouTube on June 5, 2019. The video centers around just Aiko and a microphone.

== Charts ==
Chart (2019)	Peak position
New Zealand Hot Singles (RMNZ)	20
US Billboard Hot 100	51
US Hot R&B/Hip-Hop Songs (Billboard)	19
US R&B/Hip-Hop Airplay (Billboard)	23

== Certifications ==
Region	Certification	Certified units/sales
New Zealand (RMNZ)	Gold	15,000^{‡}
United States (RIAA)	2× Platinum	2,000,000^{‡}
^{‡} Sales+streaming figures based on certification alone.

== Release history ==
Country	Date	Format	Label	Ref.
Canada	May 8, 2019	Digital download; streaming	Def Jam	
France	May 8, 2019	Digital download; streaming	Def Jam	
Germany	May 8, 2019	Digital download; streaming	Def Jam	
Italy	May 8, 2019	Digital download; streaming	Def Jam	
United Kingdom	May 8, 2019	Digital download; streaming	Def Jam	
United States	May 8, 2019	Digital download; streaming	Def Jam	
Spain	May 8, 2019	Digital download; streaming	Def Jam	
