= Sativa (song) =

2017 song by Jhené Aiko featuring Swae Lee

Song by Jhené Aiko featuring Swae Lee

from the album Trip
- Released: September 22, 2017
- Genre: R&B
- Length: 4:36
- Label: Def Jam
- Songwriters: Jhené Aiko; Brian Keith Warfield; Khalif Brown; Maclean Robinson
- Producer: Fisticuffs

Audio video
- "Sativa" on YouTube

"Sativa" is a song by American singer Jhené Aiko from her second studio album, Trip (2017). It features Swae Lee of Rae Sremmurd and was produced by Fisticuffs. A remix that adds a verse from Swae Lee's brother and bandmate, Slim Jxmmi, came out in January 2018 with a music video that Aiko released at 4:20 p.m. Pacific Time.

The song peaked at number 74 on the Billboard Hot 100 and has been certified 5× Platinum by the Recording Industry Association of America (RIAA), making it Aiko's most-certified release.

== Background ==
Aiko released Trip on September 22, 2017, with no advance notice to fans. The album grew out of the death of her brother in 2012 and follows a fictionalized journey fueled by psychedelic drugs. Its guest list included Big Sean, Kurupt, Brandy and Swae Lee. By then Swae Lee had shown his range as a hook singer, both on Rae Sremmurd's records and on French Montana's "Unforgettable".

In January 2018, "Sativa" was promoted as the album's second single, following "While We're Young".

== Composition and lyrics ==
Sheldon Pearce of Pitchfork wrote that Aiko often treats a good high as a metaphor for sensuality, and that Trip uses psychedelia as a way into eroticism. He described "Sativa" as a hushed duet in which Aiko is in her ideal setting and Swae Lee is introduced to a new one.

Pearce heard natural R&B instincts in Swae Lee's performance, with a silky, rounded tone that was softer than anything he had done as a rapper or pop singer. Aiko guides him through it and never asks too much of him, while the bass throbs underneath. Pearce also noted that on earlier collaborations with Drake, Big Sean and Childish Gambino she often played the "Cool Girl" in their fantasies, whereas here she sets the pace and controls both the story and her partner. Trevor Smith of HotNewHipHop described a hazy R&B duet in which the two singers smoke weed together and make plans, and he placed Swae Lee's turn in Aiko's murky R&B world close to Rae Sremmurd's "Now That I Know" from SremmLife 2.

Aiko wrote the song with Brian Keith Warfield, Khalif Brown and Maclean Robinson. Fisticuffs produced it.

== Remix and music video ==
"Sativa" (Remix)
- Cover of remix edition

Single by Jhené Aiko featuring Rae Sremmurd
- Released: January 22, 2018
- Genre: R&B
- Length: 4:00
- Label: Def Jam
- Songwriters: Jhené Aiko; Brian Keith Warfield; Khalif Brown; Maclean Robinson
- Producer: Fisticuffs

Jhené Aiko featuring Rae Sremmurd singles chronology
"While We're Young" (2017)	"Sativa" (Remix) (2018)

Music video
- "Sativa" on YouTube

On January 22, 2018, Aiko released a remix of "Sativa" that brings in the other half of Rae Sremmurd, Slim Jxmmi. His verse comes after Aiko's second verse.

The music video was released the same day at 4:20 p.m. Pacific Time, a nod to cannabis culture. Earlier that day, short previews unlocked on a dedicated website at 4:20 p.m. local time in cities including Sydney, Tokyo, Johannesburg, Amsterdam, London, New York City and Denver.

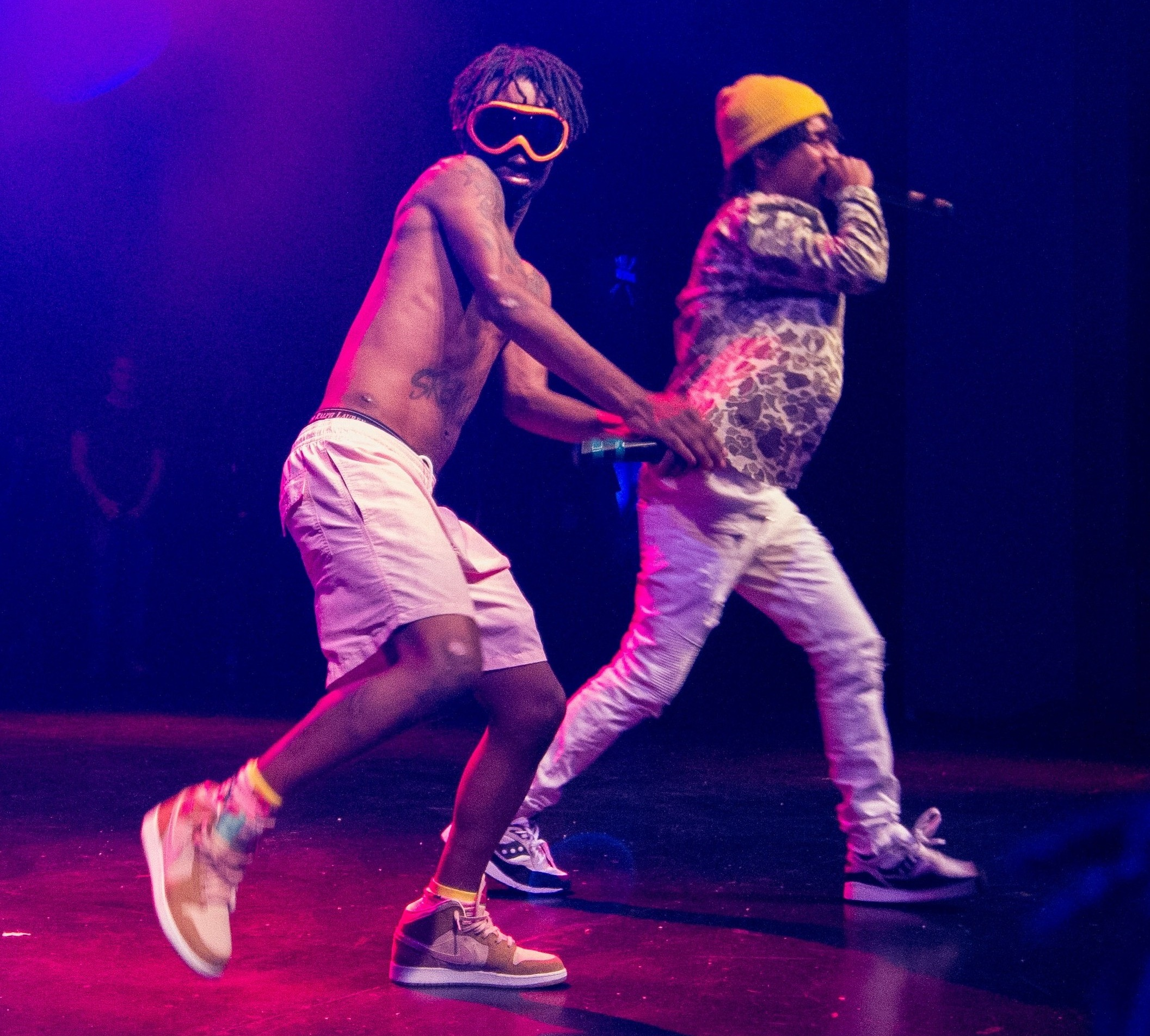
Slim Jxmmi (left) and Swae Lee (right) performing in 2015

The video is set in a futuristic world where Rae Sremmurd create Aiko in a lab. It begins with Swae Lee building a humanoid figure on a touch screen, after which Aiko climbs out of a bathtub filled with red water. The Fader described an ultramodern landscape where the duo design a human-like robot and then party with Aiko in a futuristic club. The rest of the clip moves through dance parties, steam rooms and card games, with the two rappers counting cash and showing off their jewelry. It ends with a twist in which Aiko is shown writing the video's ideas in a notebook.

== Live performances ==
Aiko and Rae Sremmurd performed the remix on The Ellen DeGeneres Show in an episode scheduled for March 23, 2018. The trio performed on a stage dressed with jungle foliage under pink and red lighting. The collaboration received gold plaques that day, and Aiko was also honored for "While We're Young".

== Commercial performance ==
"Sativa" debuted on the Billboard Hot 100 in March 2018, and it was climbing at rhythmic and urban radio at the time. In July 2022, the RIAA certified the original version with Swae Lee 5× Platinum. Rated R&B reported that this made it Aiko's most-certified release, ahead of Big Sean's "Beware" and her own "The Worst", which were both 3× Platinum. The site also noted more than 271 million streams on Spotify, her most-streamed song on the service.

== Credits and personnel ==
Credits adapted from Tidal.

- Jhené Aiko – lead artist, songwriting, recording arrangement
- Swae Lee – featured artist (original version), recording arrangement
- Rae Sremmurd – featured artist (remix)
- Brian Keith Warfield – songwriting
- Khalif Brown – songwriting
- Maclean Robinson – songwriting
- Fisticuffs – production, recording engineering
- Jaycen Joshua – mixing engineering
- Dave Nakaji – mixing, second engineering
- Iván Jiménez – mixing, second engineering
- Gregg Rominiecki – recording engineering; immersive mixing engineering (remix)
- Christian Plata – recording engineering
- Jim Caruana – recording engineering
- Casey Cuayo – recording, second engineering

== Charts ==
Chart performance for "Sativa"
Chart (2018)	Peak position
US Billboard Hot 100	74
US Hot R&B/Hip-Hop Songs (Billboard)	32
US Rhythmic Airplay (Billboard)	18

== Certifications ==
Certifications for "Sativa"
Region	Certification	Certified units/sales
New Zealand (RMNZ)	2× Platinum	60,000^{‡}
United Kingdom (BPI)	Gold	400,000^{‡}
United States (RIAA)	5× Platinum	5,000,000^{‡}
^{‡} Sales+streaming figures based on certification alone.
