= While We're Young =

While We're Young may refer to:

- While We're Young (film), a 2014 film directed by Noah Baumbach
- While We Are Young, a 2017 Singaporean TV series
- While We're Young (album), a 1993 album by John Abercrombie
- While We're Young (1943 song), a song popularized by Don Cherry, Tony Bennett and other artists
- While We're Young (Jhené Aiko song), 2017
- "While We're Young", a 2019 song by Huey Lewis and the News from the album Weather

== See also ==
- Live While We're Young, a song by One Direction
