= Chilombo =

Chilombo may refer to:

== Albums ==
- Chilombo (album), 2020 studio album by Jhené Aiko

== American singers ==
- Miyoko Chilombo (born 1981) the 1990–1993 (former) Kidsongs Kid
- Jahi Chilombo (born 1984) the 1992–1993 (former) Kidsongs Kid
- Miyagi Chilombo (born 1986) the 1993 (former) Kidsongs Kid
- Jamila Chilombo (born 1982), a.k.a. Mila J
- Jhené Aiko Chilombo (born 1988), a.k.a. Jhené Aiko
