= Amaire Johnson =

American musician

- Born: Chester, Pennsylvania, United States
- Education: Musicians Institute
- Musical career
- Genres: R&B; soul; hip hop
- Occupations: Songwriter; producer; keyboardist; music director; instrumentalist
- Labels: Don Life; FF to Def

Amaire Johnson is an American producer, songwriter, music director, and multi-instrumentalist who primarily collaborates with rapper Big Sean, and is best known for co-writing and producing Big Sean singles "Moves", "Single Again", "Bounce Back", and "One Man Can Change the World". Johnson has contributed to the following Big Sean projects in various capacities: Dark Sky Paradise (2015), Twenty88 (2016), I Decided (2017), Detroit (2019), Detroit II (2020), and Better Me Than You (2024). Johnson has also contributed to projects from Schoolboy Q, Isaiah Rashad, Nipsey Hussle, and Jhené Aiko, among others. In December 2024, XXL recognized his contribution to Ab-soul's studio album Soul Burger (album cut "Peace") as the "best produced track" on the project.

Influenced by "Motown, early hip-hop, and neo-soul", Johnson is signed to Don Life, Big Sean's production company. Johnson also acted as music director and/or performed keyboards alongside Ab-soul and Big Sean during their respective NPR Tiny Desk performances.

== Early career ==
Johnson started playing keyboards in church at 15 years old, and moved to Los Angeles in 2012 to attend the Musicians Institute. Upon graduation, he became a musician on the Maroon 5 and Kelly Clarkson-helmed 12th Annual Honda Civic Tour. He next joined Big Sean's touring band as a keyboardist.

== Selected songwriting and production credits ==
Title	Year	Artist	Album
"One Man Can Change the World" (featuring Kanye West & John Legend)	2015	Big Sean	Dark Sky Paradise
"On the Way"	2016	Twenty88	Twenty88
"Memories Faded"	2016	Twenty88	Twenty88
"Won’t Be the Same" (featuring Ayo the Producer)	2016	Westside Boogie	Thirst 48, Pt. II
"Sunroof" (featuring Dana Williams)	2016	Westside Boogie	Thirst 48, Pt. II
"Moments" (featuring Big Sean)	2017	Jhené Aiko	Trip
"OLLA (Only Lovers Left Alive)" (featuring Twenty88)	2017	Jhené Aiko	Trip
"You Are Here"	2017	Jhené Aiko	Trip
"Never Call Me" (featuring Kurupt)	2017	Jhené Aiko	Trip
"Overstimulated"	2017	Jhené Aiko	Trip
"Bad Trip (Interlude)"	2017	Jhené Aiko	Trip
"Oblivion (Creation)" (featuring Dr. Chill)	2017	Jhené Aiko	Trip
"Psilocybin (Love in Full Effect)" (featuring Dr. Chill)	2017	Jhené Aiko	Trip
"Intro"	2017	Big Sean	I Decided
"Light" (featuring Jeremih)	2017	Big Sean	I Decided
"Bounce Back"	2017	Big Sean	I Decided
"Moves"	2017	Big Sean	I Decided
"Same Time Pt. 1" (featuring Twenty88)	2017	Big Sean	I Decided
"Owe Me"	2017	Big Sean	I Decided
"Halfway Off the Balcony"	2017	Big Sean	I Decided
"Voices in My Head / Stick to the Plan"	2017	Big Sean	I Decided
"Sunday Morning Jetpack" (featuring The-Dream)	2017	Big Sean	I Decided
"Inspire Me"	2017	Big Sean	I Decided
"Bigger Than Me" (featuring Flint Chozen Choir & Starrah)	2017	Big Sean	I Decided
"Victory Lap" (featuring Stacy Barthe)	2018	Nipsey Hussle	Victory Lap
"Million While You Young" (featuring The-Dream)	2018	Nipsey Hussle	Victory Lap
"The Recipe"	2019	SiR	Chasing Summer
"More Thoughts (2019)"	2019	Big Sean	Detroit (Streaming Edition)
"Harder than My Demons"	2020	Big Sean	Detroit 2
"Everything That's Missing" (featuring Dwele)	2020	Big Sean	Detroit 2
"Don Life" (featuring Lil Wayne)	2020	Big Sean	Detroit 2
"Single Again"	2020	Big Sean	Detroit 2
"Wat U Sed" (featuring Doechii and Kal Banx)	2021	Isaiah Rashad	The House Is Burning
"Bomb" (featuring Kari Faux)	2022	Black Party	Hummingbird
"On Up"	2024	Big Sean	Better Me Than You
"Boundaries"	2024	Big Sean	Better Me Than You
"Pop" (featuring Rico Nasty)	2024	Schoolboy Q	Blue Lips
"Pig Feet" (featuring Childish Major)	2024	Schoolboy Q	Blue Lips
"Love Birds" (featuring Devin Malik & Lance Skiiiwalker)	2024	Schoolboy Q	Blue Lips
"Peace" (featuring Lupe Fiasco & Punch)	2024	Ab-Soul	Soul Burger
"Overqualified"	2025	Durand Bernarr	Bloom
"Do I Look High?" (with Julian Sintonia)	2026	Isaiah Rashad	It's Been Awful
"Ceiling (Freestyle)"	2026	Jhené Aiko	Westside Whimsy

== Awards and nominations ==
Year	Ceremony	Award	Result	Ref
2018	ASCAP Pop Music Awards	Most Performed Pop Songs ("Bounce Back")	Won	
2026	68th Annual Grammy Awards	Best R&B Song ("Overqualified")	Nominated	
