= Pussy Fairy (OTW) =

Single by Jhené Aiko

from the album Chilombo
- Released: January 16, 2020: Digital download; streaming
- Genre: R&B
- Length: 3:02 (single version); 3:41 (album version)
- Label: Def Jam
- Songwriters: Jhené Aiko; Julian-Quán Việt Lê; Micah Powell
- Producer: Julian-Quán Việt Lê

Jhené Aiko singles chronology
"None of Your Concern" (2019)	"Pussy Fairy (OTW)" (2020)	"Happiness Over Everything (H.O.E.)" (2020)

Music video
- "Pussy Fairy (OTW)" on YouTube

"Pussy Fairy (OTW)" (stylized as "P*$$Y Fairy (OTW)") is a song recorded by American singer Jhené Aiko for her third studio album, Chilombo (2020). Julian-Quán Việt Lê produced the song and co-wrote it with Aiko and Micah Powell. Def Jam released it for digital download and streaming as the album's third single on January 16, 2020. "Pussy Fairy (OTW)" is an R&B ballad, featuring an alchemy crystal sound bowl intended to activate the listener's Svadhishthana (the sacral chakra). In the lyrics, Aiko acts as the "pussy fairy" and boasts about her sexual performance.

The song received generally positive reviews from music critics, who praised its sexual content. They compared the explicit lyrics to 1990s music. "Pussy Fairy (OTW)" was Aiko's first solo single to reach the top 40 on the US Billboard Hot 100 and was certified platinum on the Recording Industry Association of America (RIAA) for selling over one million digital units. The song appeared on the UK Singles Chart and the New Zealand Hot Singles chart.

Brandon Parker directed the song's music video, which features Aiko dancing with a partner in a purple-lit dance studio. Reviewers remarked that the video was less explicit than the lyrics. Aiko also uploaded an instructional video for the choreography and a video with facts on the song, visual, and her personal life. To further promote the song, she released a capsule collection of hoodies and t-shirts and a clean version with an accompanying music video.

== Background and release ==
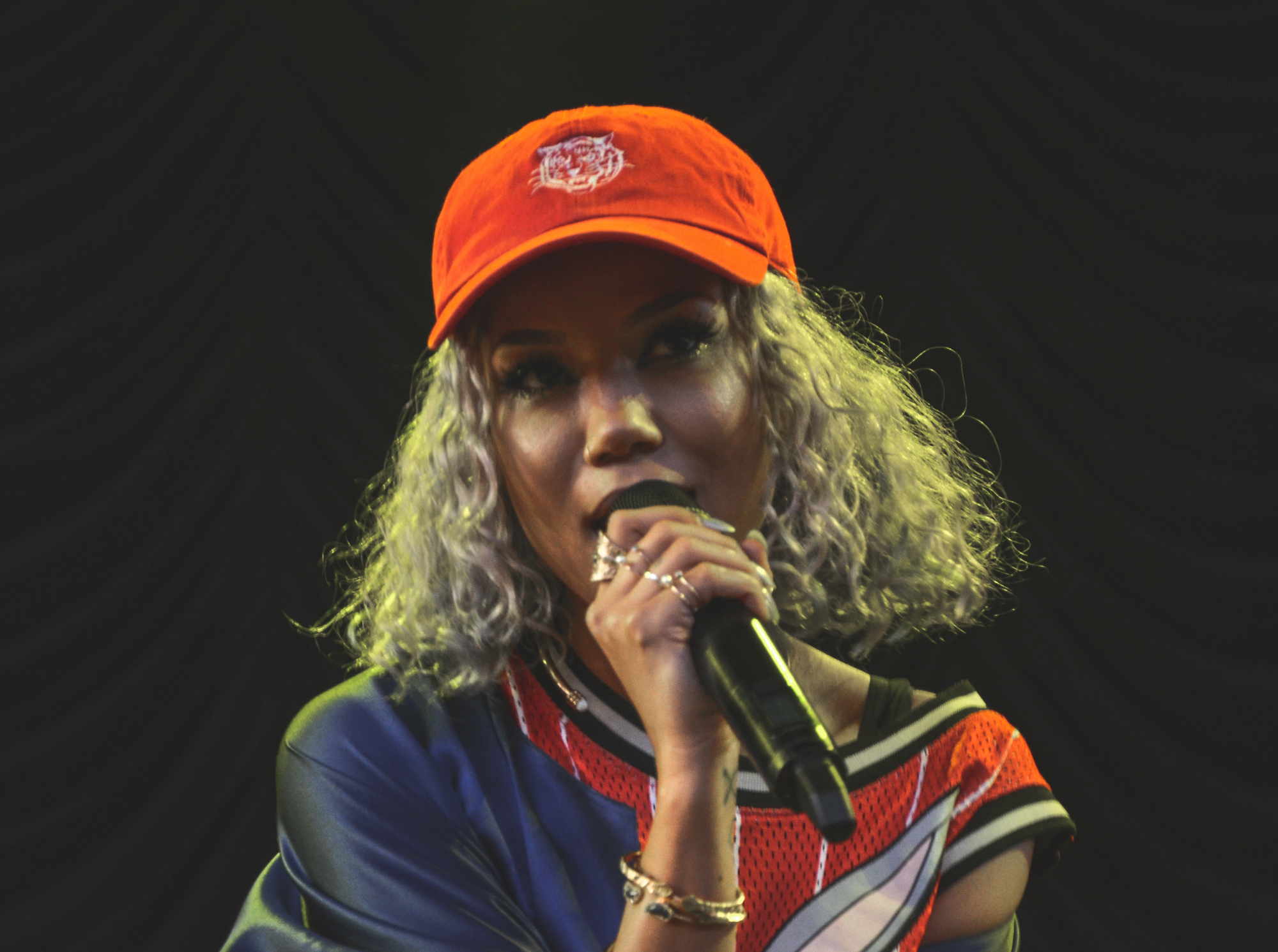
Jhené Aiko (pictured in 2016) used a conversation with her boyfriend as inspiration for the song.

Jhené Aiko co-wrote "Pussy Fairy (OTW)" with Julian-Quán Việt Lê and Micah Powell. Việt Lê produced the song, recording it on a reference microphone. Việt Lê, Christian Plata, Zeke Mishanec and Fisticuffs were the audio engineers, and were assisted by Andy Guerrero and Trey Pearce. Gregg Rominiecki handled the track's audio mixing.

Def Jam released "Pussy Fairy (OTW)" on January 16, 2020 as the third single from Aiko's third studio album, Chilombo. The song was made available for digital download and streaming. To promote it, Aiko sold a capsule collection of two types of hoodies and t-shirts through her website. Having a pink and white color scheme, the clothing had a cartoon picture of a cat dressed as a fairy alongside the single's title. A digital copy of the album was paired with each item. In a February 2020 article for HotNewHipHop, Mitch Findlay was uncertain if "Pussy Fairy (OTW)" would be included on Chilombo. However, Aiko confirmed its inclusion after unveiling the album's track listing later that month. The single is 3:01 long; on the album, it is extended to 3:41.

On February 21, 2020, Aiko released a "super clean" version of "Pussy Fairy (OTW)", which has less explicit lyrics. A music video, in which Aiko appears as a fairy in a forest on the Big Island, was made available on the same day. Prior to the video's release, she posted images of herself in the fairy costume on Instagram. Aiko announced on May 29, 2020, that she would release a new version of "Pussy Fairy (OTW)" with a longer intro on a deluxe edition of Chilombo, however, the song was the same length on the deluxe edition Def Jam released on July 17, 2020.

== Music and lyrics ==
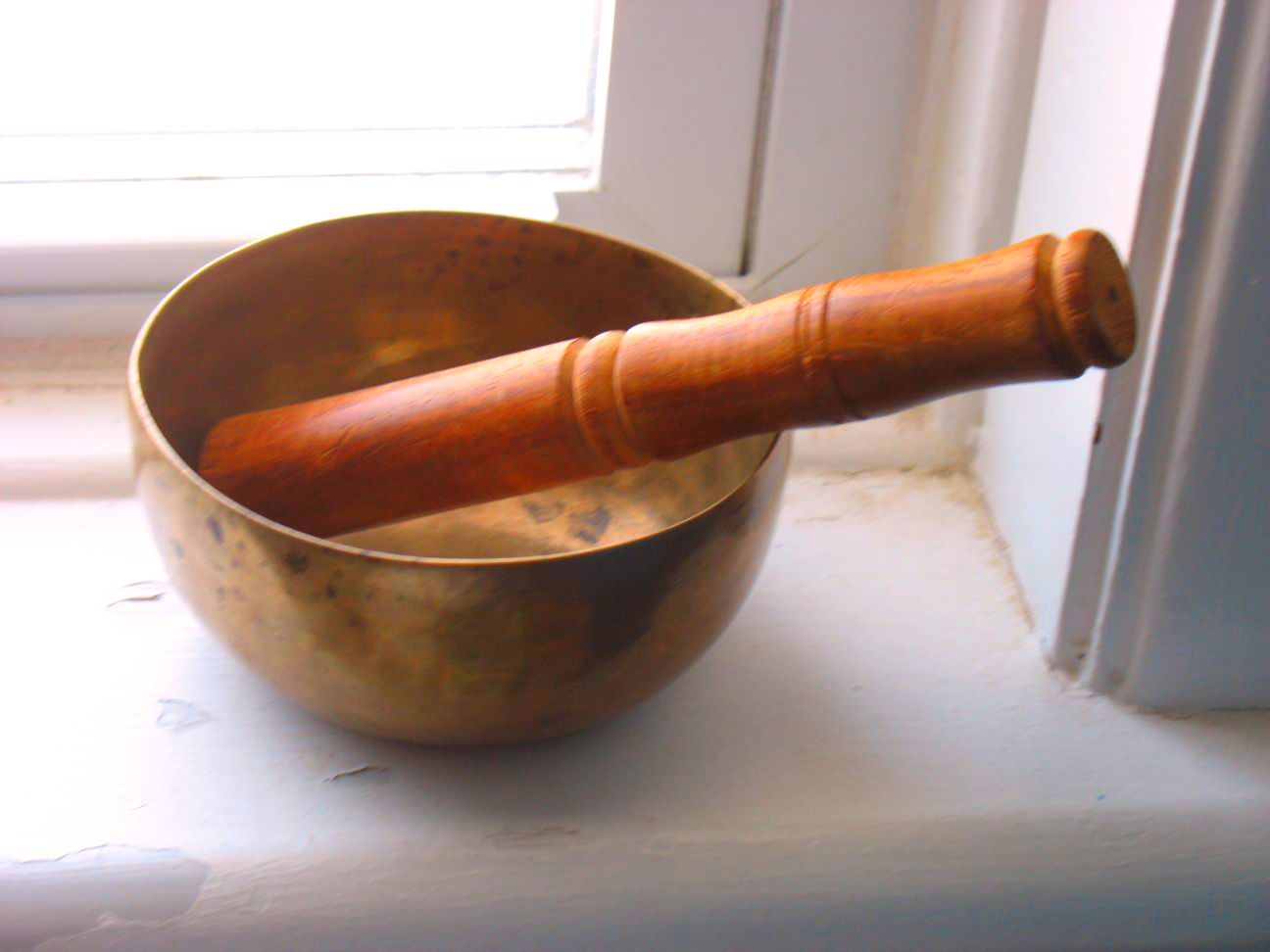
A sound bowl is featured on "Pussy Fairy (OTW)" and throughout Chilombo.

"Pussy Fairy (OTW)" is an R&B ballad written in the key of D minor, incorporating an alchemy crystal sound bowl. This instrument is featured throughout Chilombo, often used to produce a single background note. Aiko chose the key of D minor for "Pussy Fairy (OTW)" to spark the listener's Svadhishthana, a chakra associated with "pleasure and intimacy"; she described the intended response as similar to "activating your...balls and your ovaries". Aiko was introduced to sound bowls during sound therapy, and had used them in a 2019 meditation video entitled Trigger Protection Mantra. Along with the sound bowl, the song's composition includes a "bass-boosted intro". In a Vulture article, Halle Kiefer referred to the song's tone as "extremely mellow", and The Guardian's Laura Snapes said it had a "visceral fricative beat".

The single is about sexuality; Aiko sings about her "bedroom skills", and acts as the "pussy fairy" in the title. In a Noisey article, Kristin Corry summarized the song's message as a "lesson in seduction". On its release, media outlets noted its sexually explicit content, which some writers dubbed not safe for work. Nalae Anais White, writing for The Fader, described the single as "boldly sensual" and "vaguely chaotic". The sensual focus was a departure from the "fiery post-breakup energy" of Chilombo's previous singles, "Triggered (Freestyle)" and "None of Your Concern", both released in 2019.

In a review of Chilombo, Stephen Kearse of Pitchfork interpreted its first six tracks, including "Pussy Fairy (OTW)", as narrating a story about "a woman enduring heartbreak and emerging stronger". MTV News' Trey Alston wrote that the song was part of a larger theme in Aiko's music that features her singing about "how sex ties us all together and strengthens some emotions while weakening others". "Pussy Fairy (OTW)" is referenced in "On The Way", a track added to the album's deluxe edition.

Hypebeast's Sophie Caraan characterized "Pussy Fairy (OTW)"'s lyrics as "no-holds-barred". Aiko brags about her sexual performance, "I know you love fucking me", and she sings, "that dick make me so proud", to make the listener question "who is giving and receiving pleasure". In a Revolt article, Tamantha Gunn remarked that Aiko acts "all types of freaky" by singing the chorus: "Don’t be surprised boy, when I buss it wide / I hypnotize you with this pussy / Now you feel like you can fly." Reviewers believed the song was about Aiko's ex-boyfriend, Big Sean. HotNewHipHop's Lynn S. identified the line "that dick make my soul smile" as being directed toward him. Uproxx's Carolyn Droke said the lyrics, "I got you sprung off in the spring time / Fuck all your free time / You don’t need no me time / That’s you and me time", were about intimacy with a partner, while White believed they were about being overly possessive in a relationship.

== Critical reception ==
"Pussy Fairy (OTW)" was met with generally positive reviews from music critics. Billboard's Carl Lamarre praised it as the "punchiest and most provocative track" from Chilombo. In a review of the album for Exclaim!, Ryan B. Patrick said the song is "catchy and ribald as all get out" and selected it as one of the highlights. A contributor for HipHopDX wrote that "Triggered (Freestyle)" and "Pussy Fairy (OTW)" had set high expectations before the album's release. While praising Aiko's vocals, Entertainment Weekly's Marcus Jones described "Pussy Fairy (OTW)" as a "siren call hypnotizing lovers into sauntering right back into the bedroom for an extended holiday break". Glamour and Rolling Stone ranked "Pussy Fairy OTW" as one of the best songs of 2020.

Some critics praised the song for its sexually explicit lyrics, which Vibe's Candace McDuffie described as showing Aiko "relishing in the power of her own anatomy". Trey Alston commended the lyrics as "so particular and direct that you can't help but want to follow her every order". Joi-Marie McKenzie of Essence cited "Pussy Fairy (OTW)" as an example of how Aiko's focus on vibrational healing on Chilombo resonates without being "too hippy-dippy". In an April 2020 article for Elle, Nerisha Penrose named "Pussy Fairy (OTW)" one of the top 24 songs of the year to date. Penrose enjoyed the focus on the sacral chakra since it added depth to the sexual content. Praising the song as an album highlight, Laura Snapes summed it up as an "unapologetic demand for pleasure and rejection of judgment". Stephen Kearse enjoyed "Pussy Fairy (OTW)", but criticized Aiko for acting too "coy and inert" in the follow-up track "Happiness Over Everything (H.O.E.)" despite calling herself the "pussy fairy".

Vulture's Craig Jenkins compared "Pussy Fairy (OTW)"'s sexual content with 1990s songs like Bell Biv DeVoe's "Do Me!" and Silk's "Freak Me". He felt "Pussy Fairy (OTW)", Tinashe's "So Much Better" (2019) and Summer Walker's "Girls Need Love" (2018), showed R&B singers being "very upfront about sensuality and desire". In Vice, Kristin Corry said Aiko made "her own playful version of a bedroom jam", but remarked that it was not as explicit as Janet Jackson's 1997 album The Velvet Rope.

== Commercial performance ==
According to a 2020 Uproxx article, "Pussy Fairy (OTW)" was "heavily popular". It peaked at number 40 on the US Billboard Hot 100 on March 21, 2020, and remained on the chart for 25 weeks. The song was certified gold by the Recording Industry Association of America (RIAA) for sales of 500,000 units.

Twelve of Chilombo's tracks appeared on the Billboard Hot R&B Songs chart, including "Pussy Fairy (OTW)" which appeared at number five. It also reached the same position on the US R&B Digital Songs chart. The single peaked at number 10 on the US Rhythmic chart, and number 12 on the US R&B/Hip-Hop Airplay chart. The single reached number eight on the US Mainstream R&B/Hip-Hop chart, and number 23 on the US Hot R&B/Hip-Hop Songs chart. On the US R&B Streaming Songs chart, the song peaked at number three, and on the US Streaming Songs chart, it reached number 23. The song also appeared on the US On-Demand Streaming Song chart, reaching number 22, peaked at number 14 on the US R&B/Hip-Hop Digital Song Sales chart and at number 34 on the US Digital Song Sales chart.

"Pussy Fairy (OTW)" also peaked at number 28 on the US Rolling Stone Top 100 chart during the week of January 17, 2020. It also reached number six on Mediabase's Urban Airplay chart for the week of June 22, 2020. The single also appeared on international charts. In the week of March 13, 2020, it reached number 84 on the UK Singles Chart, spending a week on it. On the New Zealand Hot Singles chart, "Pussy Fairy (OTW)" peaked at number 20 for the issue date of January 27, 2020.

== Music video ==
Brandon Parker directed the song's music video, which was released on January 16, 2020, in North Hollywood. In it, Aiko dances with a man in a dance studio that has purple lighting. She uploaded an instructional video to her YouTube channel to break down the music video's dance moves for viewers. She also released a video that included trivia about the song, its music video, and her personal life. In an Uproxx article, Aaron Williams likened the concept of Aiko's video to the television show Pop-Up Video.

The song and music video received a positive response on Twitter, and Aiko became a trending topic. Critics noted that the video was not as explicit as the lyrics, although The Fader's Sajae Elder remarked that it was "still somehow a perfect match for the song's sexy subject matter". Carolyn Droke described the visual as "hypnotizing" and "intimately choreographed". Halle Kiefer compared its warehouse set and Aiko's wardrobe to the music videos for Aaliyah's songs "One in a Million" (1996) and "Are You That Somebody?" (1998).

== Credits and personnel ==
Credits adapted from the liner notes of Chilombo and Tidal:

- Jhené Aiko Efuru Chilombo – composer, lyricist
- Julian-Quán Việt Lê – producer, composer, lyricist, recording engineer, studio personnel
- Micah Powell – composer, lyricist
- Andy Guerrero – assistant recording engineer, studio personnel
- Trey Pearce – assistant recording engineer, studio personnel
- Gregg Rominiecki – mixing, studio personnel
- Christian Plata – recording engineer, studio personnel
- Fisticuffs – recording engineer, studio personnel
- Zeke Mishanec – recording engineer, studio personnel

== Charts ==
=== Weekly charts ===
Weekly chart performance for "Pussy Fairy (OTW)"
Chart (2020)	Peak position
New Zealand Hot Singles (RMNZ)	20
UK Singles (OCC)	84
US Billboard Hot 100	40
US Hot R&B/Hip-Hop Songs (Billboard)	23
US Rhythmic (Billboard)	10
US Rolling Stone Top 100	28

=== Year-end charts ===
2020 year-end chart performance for "Pussy Fairy (OTW)"
Chart (2020)	Position
US Billboard Hot 100	94
US Hot R&B/Hip-Hop Songs (Billboard)	46
US Rhythmic (Billboard)	38

== Certifications ==
Certifications for "Pussy Fairy (OTW)"
Region	Certification	Certified units/sales
New Zealand (RMNZ)	Platinum	30,000^{‡}
United Kingdom (BPI)	Silver	200,000^{‡}
United States (RIAA)	Platinum	1,000,000^{‡}
^{‡} Sales+streaming figures based on certification alone.
