= I Decided (album) =

Studio album by Big Sean
- Released: February 3, 2017
- Studio: Big Island (Kona); Doe; Max Martin's Studio; Vatican (Los Angeles); Germano (New York City); Glenwood Place (Burbank); Metropolis (London)
- Genre: Hip hop
- Length: 50:20
- Label: GOOD; Def Jam
- Producer: Allen Ritter; Amaire Johnson; Cary Singer; Big Sean; Detail; DJ Dahi; DJ Khalil; DJ Mustard; FrancisGotHeat; Fuse; Gregg Rominiecki; Hey DJ Camper; Hitmaka; Key Wane; Maximilian Jaeger; Metro Boomin; RobGotBeats; Sidney Swift; Smash David; The Track Burnaz; Travis Scott; Tre Pounds; WondaGurl

Big Sean chronology
Twenty88 (2016)	I Decided (2017)	Double or Nothing (2017)

Singles from I Decided
- 1. "Bounce Back" Released: October 31, 2016; 2. "Moves" Released: January 10, 2017; 3. "Jump Out the Window" Released: May 2, 2017

I Decided (stylized as I Decided.) is the fourth studio album by American rapper Big Sean. It was released on February 3, 2017, through GOOD Music and distributed by Def Jam Recordings. The album features guest appearances from Jeremih, Eminem, Jhené Aiko, The-Dream, Migos, and Starrah. The production on the album was handled by Sean's frequent collaborator Key Wane, alongside a variety of record producers such as Amaire Johnson, Metro Boomin, WondaGurl, Fuse, Tre Pounds, DJ Mustard, DJ Dahi, Detail, and The Track Burnaz, among others.

I Decided was supported by three singles: "Bounce Back", "Moves", and "Jump Out the Window". The album received generally positive reviews from critics and debuted at number one on the US Billboard 200. It is Sean's second US number-one album. The album was certified platinum by the Recording Industry Association of America (RIAA).

== Background ==
I Decided is a concept album that centers around the idea of rebirth. In January 2017, during an episode of The Tonight Show Starring Jimmy Fallon, Big Sean confirmed that both men on the album cover are him—a present-day version to the left and an older version of himself to the right.

Speaking to Zane Lowe about I Decided, Sean explained the title of the project: "[the title] means so many things. I feel like life is all about the decisions you make. This is what I decided. That's why I put a period on the end of it—because this is definitive." He also cited Kanye West as an inspiration to his creative process behind the album in an interview with Fact: "He helped me learn how to make albums", and although West is absent from the record, the Detroit-based rapper exclusively told Capital XTRA that he was very influential in the project – helping to shape many songs." West is also credited as one of the album's executive producers.

== Promotion ==
=== Singles ===
"Bounce Back" was released as the album's lead single on October 31, 2016. The track was produced by Hitmaka, co-produced by Smash David, with additional production by Metro Boomin and Amaire Johnson.

"Moves" was first released as the album's promotional single on December 22, 2016. The track was later serviced to rhythmic radio on January 10, 2017, as the album's second single. The track was produced by Fuse, co-produced by Tre Pounds, with additional production by Maximilian Johnson.

The album's third single, "Jump Out the Window", was released to urban radio on May 2, 2017. The track was produced by Key Wane, with additional production by Hey DJ Camper.

=== Promotional singles ===
The album's promotional single, "Halfway Off the Balcony", was released on January 18, 2017. The track was produced by Amaire Johnson, with additional production by Maximilian Jaeger.

=== Performances ===
In January 2017, Big Sean performed "Bounce Back" along with "Sunday Morning Jetpack" on Saturday Night Live.

== Critical reception ==
Professional ratings
Aggregate scores
Source	Rating
AnyDecentMusic?	6.0/10
Metacritic	67/100
Review scores
Source	Rating
AllMusic	3.5/5 stars
Clash	7/10
Consequence	B−
Entertainment Weekly	B+
Exclaim!	7/10
HipHopDX	4.1/5
Pitchfork	6.3/10
Pretty Much Amazing	B−
Rolling Stone	3/5 stars
XXL	4/5

I Decided was met with generally positive reviews. At Metacritic, which assigns a normalized rating out of 100 to reviews from professional publications, the album received an average score of 67, based on 13 reviews. Aggregator AnyDecentMusic? gave it 6.0 out of 10, based on their assessment of the critical consensus.

Neil Z. Yeung from AllMusic wrote: "While I Decided. may not light up the club like his past efforts, it shines a different, more nurturing light onto deeper parts of his soul." Andy Belt of Consequence said, "I Decided. is a fresh statement that proves Big Sean is continuing to evolve". Eric Renner Brown of Entertainment Weekly said, "It's a supremely listenable album, loaded with comfort-food hip-hop fit for booming club sound systems and earbuds on the subway alike. It's also Sean's most cohesive, personal work to date". A. Harmony of Exclaim! said, "Big Sean exhibits growth and wisdom on I Decided., and that's definitely worth a listen. This is a solid effort". Colin Groundwater for Pretty Much Amazing stated that "on his fourth studio album, he positions himself as hip-hop's poster-boy for all of these qualities [hard work, sacrifice, persistence, gratitude], but in rapping about such unassailable ideas, he comes away with uninteresting results". HipHopDX stated, "Is it going to be the album of the year? No. But it's a very high quality, and very enjoyable". Preezy of XXL said, "Big Sean rises to the occasion on I Decided., arguably the best album of his career, and one that secures his spot as one of the top five artists in hip-hop today". Jack Dolan of Clash said, "While it's undoubtedly a solid addition to Sean's catalogue, at the end of I Decided. it's the flows and instrumentals that are left with the listener, having upstaged what Sean is actually trying to say".

Matthew Strauss of Pitchfork said, "While he has become incrementally more skilled over the years, not much else has changed. Throughout I Decided., Sean conflates the passing of time with growth and progress. Nothing on I Decided., however, suggests that he has gained perspective worth sharing or to which he should devote a whole album". S. David of Tiny Mix Tapes said, "He is not a bad rapper, simply an average evangelist, and I Decided. is the latest chapter in his average brand of hero-worshiping gospel. He is a welcome change from the inheritors and the try-hards; he brings a tired smile to the face". Writing for Rolling Stone, Brittany Spanos concluded: "As always, his earnestness is believable. Every moment he counts his blessings – like on the casually catchy single "Bounce Back" – you root for him. He embraces his underdog status, especially since he is most often pitted against and working with rap's biggest personalities, like Kanye West, Drake, and Kendrick Lamar. More often than not, however, he gets swallowed by the larger-than-life brands and presences of those he surrounds himself with, like Eminem who steals Sean's thunder with the quality, agility and fire of his guest verse on "No Favors"."

=== Year-end lists ===
Select year-end rankings of I Decided
Publication	List	Rank	Ref.
Clash	Clash Albums of the Year 2017	43	
HipHopDX	HipHopDX's Best Rap Albums of 2017	14	

== Commercial performance ==
I Decided debuted at number one on the US Billboard 200 chart, earning 151,000 album-equivalent units, (of which 65,000 were pure album sales) in its first week. This became Sean's second US number-one album. In its second week, the album dropped to number three on the chart, earning an additional 66,000 units. In its third week, the album dropped to number six on the chart, earning 49,000 more units. As of September 2017, the album has earned 724,000 album-equivalent units in the US. On October 25, 2017, the album was certified platinum by the Recording Industry Association of America (RIAA) for combined sales, streaming and track-sales equivalent of over a million units in the United States. I Decided was ranked as the 20th most popular album of 2017 on the Billboard 200.

== Track listing ==
I Decided track listing
No.	Title	Writer(s)	Producer(s)	Length
1.	"Intro"	Sean Anderson; Lawrence Jenkins; Michael Carson	Amaire Johnson	1:04
2.	"Light" (featuring Jeremih)	Anderson; Johnson; Garry Glenn	Johnson; Big Sean; Gregg Rominiecki^{[b]}; Maximilian Jaeger^{[b]}	3:30
3.	"Bounce Back"	Anderson; Christian Ward; Leland Tyler Wayne; Samuel David Jimenez; Johnson; Jeremy Felton; Kanye West	Hitmaka; Smash David^{[a]}; Metro Boomin^{[b]}; Johnson^{[b]}	3:42
4.	"No Favors" (featuring Eminem)	Anderson; Brittany Hazzard; Ebony Oshunrinde; Bach Hoang Nguyen-Tran; Mark Sebastian; Steve Boone; John Sebastian; Marshall Mathers	WondaGurl; Big Sean^{[b]}; FrancisGotHeat^{[b]}	5:25
5.	"Jump Out the Window"	Anderson; Jason "Poo Bear" Boyd; Dwane M. Weir II; Darhyl Camper, Jr.	Key Wane; Hey DJ Camper^{[b]}	3:33
6.	"Moves"	Anderson; Eduardo Earle; Jeffrey LaCroix; Johnson; Serge Durand	Fuse; Tre Pounds^{[a]}; Johnson^{[b]}	2:22
7.	"Same Time Pt. 1" (featuring Twenty88)	Anderson; Johnson	Johnson	1:29
8.	"Owe Me"	Anderson; Dijon McFarlane; Johnson	DJ Mustard; Johnson; Travis Scott^{[b]}	4:31
9.	"Halfway Off the Balcony"	Anderson; Johnson; Jaeger	Johnson; Jaeger^{[b]}	3:50
10.	"Voices in My Head / Stick to the Plan"	Anderson; Dacoury Natche; Wayne; Khalil Abdul-Rahman	DJ Dahi; Metro Boomin; Johnson^{[b]}	4:02
11.	"Sunday Morning Jetpack" (featuring The-Dream)	Anderson; Johnson; Terius Nash	Johnson; Cary Singer^{[b]}	3:45
12.	"Inspire Me"	Anderson; Noel Fisher; Sidney Swift; Justin Philip Bradley; Ruben Jason Raymond; Justin Rodriguez	Detail; The Track Burnaz; Swift; Johnson^{[b]}	3:28
13.	"Sacrifices" (featuring Migos)	Anderson; Wayne; Allen Ritter; Quavious Marshall; Kiari Cephus	Metro Boomin; Ritter^{[a]}	4:47
14.	"Bigger Than Me" (featuring Flint Chozen Choir and Starrah)	Anderson; Hazzard; Robert Harris; Johnson; Juliet Roberts; Steve Jeffries; Thomas Blaize; Moses Anthony Davis; Andrew Thomas; Steven Michael Marsden	RobGotBeats; Johnson	4:52
Total length:				50:20

Notes

- ^{^{^[a]}} signifies a co-producer
- ^{^{^[b]}} signifies an additional producer
- "Intro" features vocals by JR Starr
- "Bounce Back" features additional vocals by Kanye West and Jeremih
- "No Favors" features additional vocals by Starrah and Iman Milner
- "Jump Out the Window" features additional vocals by Starrah, Jeremih and Tommy Parker
- "Same Time, Pt. 1" features talk box by Andre Troutman
- "Owe Me" features additional vocals by Michael Carson and Big Sean
- "Halfway Off the Balcony" features additional vocals from Amaire Johnson, Maximilian Jaeger, Eric Duncan and Big Sean
- "Sunday Morning Jetpack" features vocals by Cary Singer
- "Bigger Than Me" features additional vocals by Myra Anderson and Big Sean

Sample credits

- "Light" contains an interpolation from the composition "Intimate Friends", written by Garry Glenn.
- "No Favors" contains a sample from "Summer in the City", performed by Quincy Jones featuring Valerie Simpson, and written by Mark Sebastian, Steve Boone and John Sebastian.
- "Bigger Than Me" contains samples from the library recording "Get the Feelin'", produced under license from The Carlin Recorded Music Library, and written by Juliet Roberts, Steve Jeffries and Thomas Blaize; and an interpolation from "Romie", written by Moses Davis, Andrew Thomas and Steven Marsden, and performed by Beenie Man.

== Personnel ==
Credits adapted from the I Decided album credits.

- Nick Kennerly – violin (tracks 2, 11, 14)
- Peter Lee Johnson – violin (tracks 2, 11, 14)
- Amaire Johnson – bass (track 1), keyboards (tracks 1, 8), synthesizer (track 1), piano (track 8); strings (track 8); production coordinator
- David Pizzimenti – assistant engineer (tracks 2, 14)
- Matthew Sim – assistant engineer (tracks 2, 14)
- Manny Park – assistant engineer (tracks 7, 10, 12, 14)
- Nick Mills – assistant engineer (tracks 4, 7, 8, 9)
- Gregg Rominiecki – recording; mixing (tracks 2, 5, 8, 9)
- Maximilian Jaeger – recording; mixing (tracks 2, 8)
- Hector Fernandez – mix assistant, assistant engineer (track 9)
- Henry Solomon – clairinet, flute, horn, saxophone (track 9)
- Rob Kinelski – mixing (tracks 11, 12, 14)
- Manny Marroquin – mixing (track 4)
- Mike Strange – vocal recording for Eminem
- Joe Strange – vocal recording for Eminem
- Jaycen Joshua – mixing (tracks 4, 7, 10)
- Dave Nakaji – assistant mix engineer (tracks 4, 7, 10)
- Maddox Chhim – assistant mix engineer (tracks 4, 7, 10)
- Li So – guitar (track 7)
- Rumeal Eggleston – bass (track 7)
- Albert Strickland – choir director
- Mike Carson – creative direction (for the 92 Group)
- Juco – photography
- Omar Rajput – graphic design
- K8 [Young Algorithm] – web development
- JR Starr – model
- Ade Samuel – styling
- Kahlil Sledge – grooming
- Deborah Mannis-Gardner – sample clearances
- Chris Athens – mastering

== Charts ==
=== Weekly charts ===
Chart performance for I Decided
Chart (2017)	Peak position
Australian Albums (ARIA)	14
Australian Urban Albums (ARIA)	1
Belgian Albums (Ultratop Flanders)	67
Belgian Albums (Ultratop Wallonia)	121
Canadian Albums (Billboard)	1
Danish Albums (Hitlisten)	15
Dutch Albums (Album Top 100)	10
Finnish Albums (Suomen virallinen lista)	11
French Albums (SNEP)	69
German Albums (Offizielle Top 100)	62
Irish Albums (IRMA)	48
Latvian Albums (LaIPA)	89
New Zealand Albums (RMNZ)	12
Swedish Albums (Sverigetopplistan)	19
Swiss Albums (Schweizer Hitparade)	39
UK Albums (Official Charts)	12
US Billboard 200	1
US Top R&B/Hip-Hop Albums (Billboard)	1

=== Year-end charts ===
2017 year-end chart performance for I Decided
Chart (2017)	Position
US Billboard 200	20
US Top R&B/Hip-Hop Albums (Billboard)	11

== Certifications ==
Certifications and sales for I Decided
Region	Certification	Certified units/sales
New Zealand (RMNZ)	Gold	7,500^{‡}
United States (RIAA)	Platinum	1,000,000^{‡}
^{‡} Sales+streaming figures based on certification alone.

== Release history ==
Release dates and formats for I Decided
Region	Date	Label(s)	Format(s)	Ref.
Various	February 3, 2017	GOOD; Def Jam	Digital download; streaming	
Various	February 17, 2017	GOOD; Def Jam	CD	
Various	April 14, 2017	GOOD; Def Jam	Vinyl	
