= Moves (Big Sean song) =

Single by Big Sean

from the album I Decided
- Released: January 10, 2017
- Genre: Hip hop; trap
- Length: 2:22
- Label: GOOD; Def Jam
- Songwriters: Sean Anderson; Eduardo Earle, Jr.; Jeffrey LaCroix; Amaire Johnson; Serge Durand
- Producers: Fuse; Tre Pounds; Johnson

Big Sean singles chronology
"Castro" (2016)	"Moves" (2017)	"I Think of You" (2017)

Music video
- "Moves" on YouTube

"Moves" is a hip hop song recorded by American rapper Big Sean. It was originally released on December 22, 2016, as a promotional single then later sent to rhythmic radio as the second official single from his fourth studio album, I Decided (2017). The song was produced by Fuse and Tre Pounds, with additional production by Amaire Johnson. It features additional songwriting by Serge Durand.

== Release ==
Big Sean previewed "Moves" on December 16, 2016, and premiered the full version of the song on December 22, 2016.

== Music video ==
The music video for the song, directed by Mike Carson, premiered on January 4, 2017 via Sean's Vevo channel.

== Chart performance ==
Moves peaked at number 38 on the US Billboard Hot 100 and spent a total of 18 weeks on the chart. It also peaked at number 15 on the Hot R&B/Hip-Hop Songs chart. On August 19, 2020, the single was certified double platinum by the Recording Industry Association of America (RIAA) for combined sales and streaming data of over two million units in the United States.

== Charts ==
=== Weekly charts ===
Chart (2016–17)	Peak position
Australia Urban (ARIA)	18
Canada Hot 100 (Billboard)	46
US Billboard Hot 100	38
US Hot R&B/Hip-Hop Songs (Billboard)	15
US Rhythmic Airplay (Billboard)	14

=== Year-end charts ===
Chart (2017)	Position
US Hot R&B/Hip-Hop Songs (Billboard)	61

== Certifications ==
Region	Certification	Certified units/sales
New Zealand (RMNZ)	Gold	15,000^{‡}
United States (RIAA)	2× Platinum	2,000,000^{‡}
^{‡} Sales+streaming figures based on certification alone.
