= Happiness Over Everything (H.O.E.) =

2020 single by Jhené Aiko featuring Future and Miguel

Single by Jhené Aiko featuring Future and Miguel

from the album Chilombo
- Released: February 26, 2020
- Genre: R&B
- Length: 3:08
- Label: Def Jam
- Songwriters: Jhené Aiko Chilombo; Nayvadius Wilburn; Miguel Pimentel; Andre Benjamin; Brian Keith Warfield; Maclean Robinson
- Producer: Fisticuffs

Jhené Aiko singles chronology
"Pussy Fairy (OTW)" (2020)	"Happiness Over Everything (H.O.E.)" (2020)	"B.S." (2020)

Future singles chronology
"Big Drip" (2020)	"Happiness Over Everything (H.O.E.)" (2020)	"Tycoon" (2020)

Miguel singles chronology
"Funeral" (2019)	"Happiness Over Everything (H.O.E.)" (2020)	"Don't Forget My Love" (2022)

Music video
- "Happiness Over Everything (H.O.E.)" on YouTube

"Happiness Over Everything (H.O.E.)" is a song by American singer Jhené Aiko featuring fellow American singers Future and Miguel. It was released on February 26, 2020, as the fourth single from Aiko's third studio album Chilombo (2020).

== Composition ==
The song interpolates and is an ode to Jhené Aiko's 2011 song "Hoe", as well as "Where Are My Panties? (Interlude)" by André 3000, which Miguel reworks. The "sex-positive" track finds Aiko singing about not having to worry how others think of her.

== Music video ==
The music video premiered on February 27, 2020. In it, Jhené Aiko is at a luau-themed party with friends and family. Her sister Mila J, mother, and father appear in the video.

== Charts ==
Chart (2020)	Peak position
New Zealand Hot Singles (RMNZ)	31
US Billboard Hot 100	65
US Hot R&B/Hip-Hop Songs (Billboard)	41

== Certifications ==
Region	Certification	Certified units/sales
United States (RIAA)	Platinum	1,000,000^{‡}
^{‡} Sales+streaming figures based on certification alone.
