= Westside Whimsy =

Studio album by Jhené Aiko
- Released: September 11, 2026
- Length: 55:49
- Labels: ArtClub; Def Jam
- Producers: Boi-1da; Fisticuffs; Amaire Johnson; Julian-Quan Viet Le; MTech; Ohma; PartyNextDoor; Scott Bridgeway; Sounwave; Swam; Jahaan Sweet; Jesse "Corparal" Wilson

Jhené Aiko chronology
Chilombo (2020)	Westside Whimsy (2026)

Singles from Westside Whimsy
- 1. "Break" Released: November 18, 2025; 2. "So Good" Released: September 25, 2026

Professional ratings
Review scores
Source	Rating
AllMusic	3.5/5 stars
Pitchfork	6.3/10

Westside Whimsy is the fourth studio album by the American singer and songwriter Jhené Aiko. It was released on September 11, 2026, by ArtClub International and Def Jam Recordings. Six years following the release of her previous studio album Chilombo (2020), Aiko surprise announced the album on her social media the week of its release. The album includes collaborations with Ab-Soul, Kendrick Lamar, Larry June, Ohma, and Tyga.

The album debuted at number one on the Billboard 200 with seventy-four thousand album-equivalent units, becoming Aiko's first number-one album on the chart.

== Background ==
Shortly after the release of her third studio album, Chilombo (2020), Aiko intended to embark on the Magic Hour Tour. However, it was subsequently cancelled following lockdown restrictions during the COVID-19 pandemic, but would later occur in 2024. In 2021, during her hiatus from music, Aiko re-released her 2011 mixtape Sailing Soul(s) to all streaming platforms to honor the project's 10-year anniversary. In 2022, Aiko gave birth to her second child and son Noah with rapper Big Sean.

In a 2026 interview with Complex, Aiko described that the album as "laid-back", which is heavily influenced by 1990s music. The album was also inspired by her hometown in California, with elements of West Coast culture and surf culture. Aiko stated: "When I think of California, it's just such a magical place and I love a good road trip and I've been doing them for many years."

== Release and promotion ==
On November 18, 2025, Aiko released the single "Break", which would appear on the album. In January 2026, in partnership with Erewhon, she announced a smoothie named Westside Whimsy, teasing the album's title. On September 8, 2026, Aiko surprise announced Westside Whimsy on all social media platforms the week of the album's release. A day after, she revealed the album's track list consisting of 20 tracks.

She is scheduled to embark on the Ark to Agartha tour in North America in support of the album. The tour begins on March 11, 2027 in St. Louis and conclude on May 21, 2027 in Los Angeles, and H.E.R., Swae Lee, and Karri will open for the tour.

== Commercial performance ==
According to Luminate data reported by Billboard, the album earned 74,000 album-equivalent units in its first week in the United States, comprising 70,000 streaming-equivalent albums from 71.33 million streams, 3,500 album sales, and 500 track-equivalent albums. It debuted at number one on the Billboard 200, and numbers one and twenty-five on the component charts Top Streaming Albums and Top Album Sales, respectively. 10 of the album's tracks charted on the Billboard Hot 100. According to data reported by Hits, it earned 73,466 units in its first US week, comprising 69,514 streaming-equivalent albums, 3,528 album sales, and 424 track-equivalent albums.

== Track listing ==
Westside Whimsy track listing
No.	Title	Writer(s)	Producer(s)	Length
1.	"Wild Cat(s)"	Jhené Aiko Efuru Chilombo; Brian Warfield; Julian-Quan Viet Le; Maclean Robinson	Fisticuffs; Le	1:06
2.	"Ghost"	Chilombo; Le; Robinson; Warfield	Fisticuffs; Le	2:03
3.	"Break"	Chilombo; Le; Robinson; Warfield	Le	3:15
4.	"Love Bomb" (with Ab-Soul)	Chilombo; Le; Robinson; Warfield; Herbert Anthony Stevens IV	Fisticuffs; Le	2:31
5.	"Ceiling (Freestyle)"	Chilombo; Amaire Johnson; Roman Mironchenko	Johnson; Swam	3:27
6.	"Nothing Nice to Say"	Chilombo; Le; Robinson; Warfield	Fisticuffs; Le	2:15
7.	"He Belongs"	Chilombo; Le; Robinson; Warfield	Fisticuffs; Le	3:21
8.	"Like, Whatever" (featuring Tyga)	Chilombo; Le; Robinson; Warfield; Micheal Ray Stevenson	Fisticuffs; Le	3:31
9.	"You"	Chilombo; Le; Robinson; Warfield	Fisticuffs; Le	1:43
10.	"Don't Be That Guy"	Chilombo; Darius Logan; Dominique Logan; Corparal; Mike Jay	Jesse "Corparal" Wilson	2:54
11.	"Lullaby"	Chilombo; Le; Robinson; Warfield	Fisticuffs; Le	2:58
12.	"Neighbors" (featuring Larry June)	Chilombo; Le; Leonard Eugene Hendricks III; Matthew Dean Burdette	Le	3:35
13.	"Mine"	Chilombo; Jahron Anthony Brathwaite; Matthew Samuels	Boi-1da; PartyNextDoor	2:44
14.	"So Good" (featuring Kendrick Lamar)	Chilombo; Jahaan Sweet; Kendrick Duckworth; Mark Spears; Matthew "MTech" Bernard; Ruchaun "Scott Bridgeway" Akers Jr.	Sweet; MTech; Scott Bridgeway; Sounwave	3:57
15.	"Beach Boy"	Chilombo; Le; Robinson; Warfield	Fisticuffs; Le	3:27
16.	"Unicorn"	Chilombo; Le; Robinson; Warfield	Fisticuffs; Le	2:58
17.	"I Don't Mind"	Chilombo; Hendricks; Le; Robinson; Warfield; Dexter Wansel; Theodore Life	Fisticuffs; Le	3:10
18.	"Nami's Haiku"	Chilombo; Le	Le	2:19
19.	"A Living Light"	Chilombo; Le; Robinson; Warfield	Fisticuffs; Le	2:59
20.	"Golden Coast" (featuring Ohma)	Chilombo; Robinson; Warfield; Hailey Niswanger; Mia Garcia	Fisticuffs; Ohma	1:28
Total length:				55:49

An edition with a bonus track, "Elsewhere", was released exclusively to ITunes on September 15, 2026, available for a limited time.

=== Notes ===
- "I Don't Mind" samples and interpolates "The Show Is Over", written by Theodore Life and Dexter Wansel, as performed by Evelyn "Champagne" King, and interpolates "You Know How We Do It", as performed by Ice Cube.

== Personnel ==
Credits were adapted from Spotify.

- Jhené Aiko Efuru Chilombo – executive production
- Ketrina "Taz" Askew – executive production
- Ab-Soul – background vocals (4)
- Amaire Johnson – programming, drum kit (5)
- Blaq Tuxedo – vocal production, programming, bass, keyboard (10)
- Boi-1da – programming (13)
- Brian Warfield – background vocals (1); recording (1–4, 6–9, 12, 15–17, 19, 20); programming (1, 2, 4, 6–9, 11, 15–17); trumpet (3); keyboard (6–9, 11, 15–17); trombone (12); programming engineering (19, 20)
- Collin Clark – engineering assistance (1, 2, 4–10, 12–15, 17–20)
- Dan Kamerman-Glik – engineering assistance (1, 2, 4–10, 12–15, 17–20)
- David Otis – saxophone (1, 2, 11, 16)
- Dereshean "OTR" Jarrett – recording (3)
- Erik Hammer – guitar (10)
- Garrett Duncan – engineering assistance (1, 2, 4–10, 12–15, 17–20)
- Gregg Rominiecki – recording, mixing (all tracks); background vocals (1, 15, 20); mastering (3)
- Hailey Niswanger – flute (20)
- Jacob Stewart – engineering assistance (1, 2, 4–10, 12–15, 17–20)
- Jahaan Sweet – bass, keyboard (14)
- Jesse "Corparal" Wilson – programming, bass, keyboard (10)
- Jonah Levine – guitar (19)
- Julian-Quan Viet Le – arrangement (1, 2); programming (1, 2, 4, 6–9, 11, 12, 15–18); recording (1–4, 6–9, 11, 12, 14–20); keyboard (1, 3, 6–9, 11, 12, 15–20); drum kit, bass (3, 12); flute (7); background vocals (15); programming engineering (19)
- Kayla Dewitt – engineering assistance (1, 2, 4–10, 12–15, 17–20)
- Larry June – background vocals (12, 17)
- Luke Kennedy Aiono – guitar (19)
- Maclean Robinson – programming (4)
- Megan Shung – strings (1, 2)
- Mia Garcia – guitar (20)
- Matthew "MTech" Bernard – programming engineering (14)
- Noah Stewart – background vocals (8)
- Oli Jacobs – mixing (14)
- Owen Clapp – bass (1)
- Paris Arditti – recording (10)
- Robert "Bubby" Lewis – bass (17)
- Samantha Henry – recording (8)
- Scott Bridgeway – programming engineering (14)
- Sounwave – programming engineering (14)
- Swam – keyboard (5)
- Todd Cooper – recording (1, 2, 4–20); background vocals (20)
- Victor San Pedro – guitar (19)

== Charts ==
Chart performance for Westside Whimsy
Chart (2026)	Peak position
Australian Albums (ARIA)	42
Australian Hip Hop/R&B Albums (ARIA)	8
Canadian Albums (Billboard)	33
French Albums (SNEP)	91
New Zealand Albums (RMNZ)	22
Portuguese Albums (AFP)	95
Swiss Albums (Schweizer Hitparade)	75
UK Albums (Official Charts)	41
UK R&B Albums (Official Charts)	33
US Billboard 200	1
US Top R&B/Hip-Hop Albums (Billboard)	1
