= Jump Out the Window =

Single by Big Sean

from the album I Decided
- Released: May 2, 2017
- Genre: Hip hop
- Length: 3:33
- Label: GOOD; Def Jam
- Songwriters: Sean Anderson; Jason "Poo Bear" Boyd; Dwane M. Weir; Darhyl Camper, Jr.
- Producers: Key Wane; Hey DJ Camper

Big Sean singles chronology
"I Think of You" (2017)	"Jump Out the Window" (2017)	"Feels" (2017)

Music video
- "Jump Out the Window" on YouTube

"Jump Out the Window" is a song by American rapper Big Sean from his fourth studio album I Decided (2017). It was sent to urban contemporary radio as the third single from the album on May 2, 2017. The song was produced by Key Wane, with additional production by Hey DJ Camper. It also features uncredited vocals from singers Starrah, Jeremih and Tommy Parker. The song contains a sample of "I Fall Apart" by Julianna Gianni, from the soundtrack of the film Vanilla Sky.

== Music video ==
The music video was released on May 7, 2017, and was directed by Lawrence Lamont. It finds Big Sean arriving at his girl Princess's house, only to discover that she was abducted into a Super Nintendo console by a video game villain. He gets sucked into the pixelated video game world, where he fights his way through several video games before saving the Princess. When they escape the game world, they discover the villain has followed them into reality. Sean makes him disappear by unplugging the console.

== Live performances ==
Big Sean performed the song on MTV Movie & TV Awards. He released the music video right after his performance.

== Charts ==
Chart (2017)	Peak position
Canada Hot 100 (Billboard)	93
US Billboard Hot 100	76
US Hot R&B/Hip-Hop Songs (Billboard)	29
US R&B/Hip-Hop Airplay (Billboard)	44

== Certifications ==
Region	Certification	Certified units/sales
New Zealand (RMNZ)	Gold	15,000^{‡}
United States (RIAA)	Platinum	1,000,000^{‡}
^{‡} Sales+streaming figures based on certification alone.
