= Bezerk (song) =

2019 single by Big Sean ft. ASAP Ferg and Hit-Boy

Single by Big Sean featuring ASAP Ferg and Hit-Boy

from the album Detroit 2
- Released: August 26, 2019
- Genre: Hip hop; trap
- Length: 2:31
- Label: GOOD; Def Jam
- Songwriters: Sean Anderson; Darold Ferguson; Chauncey Hollis; Dustin Corbett; Greg Davis
- Producer: Hit-Boy

Big Sean singles chronology
"Single Again" (2019)	"Bezerk" (2019)	"None of Your Concern" (2019)

ASAP Ferg singles chronology
"Floor Seats" (2019)	"Bezerk" (2019)	"Value" (2020)

Music video
- "Bezerk" on YouTube

"Bezerk" is a single by American rapper Big Sean featuring fellow American rapper ASAP Ferg and American record producer Hit-Boy. It was released on August 26, 2019 as a standalone single. The song was produced by Hit-Boy, with additional production by DJ Corbett and G-Dav.

== Background and composition ==
Hours after the song was released, it was premiered by Big Sean and ASAP Ferg at the MTV Video Music Awards. A snippet of the music video was also teased on Twitter by Sean on the same day.

On a "bouncy, 808-heavy" beat produced by Hit-Boy, the rappers bring great energy and rap about a variety of topics, including designer clothing, relationships with women and God-given abilities; Ferg talks about "moving product" in his youth. The two also "trade bars" about their haters.

== Music video ==
The music video for the song was directed by Mike Carson and the two rappers, and premiered on September 26, 2019. It starts off with the rappers buying snacks at a liquor store. Big Sean buys an Arizona ice tea, which ASAP Ferg warns will lower sperm count. As they debate, a young girl approaches them and throws a grenade at them, seemingly transporting Sean and Ferg to an alternate universe, where they run through a neighborhood and are chased by children. They even become airborne for a while and hang from the top of the Big Ben, now bedazzled in diamonds as a resemblance to Rolex.

== Charts ==
Chart (2019)	Peak position
Canada Hot 100 (Billboard)	85
New Zealand Hot Singles (RMNZ)	26
US Billboard Hot 100	89
US Hot R&B/Hip-Hop Songs (Billboard)	39

== Certifications ==
Region	Certification	Certified units/sales
United States (RIAA)	Gold	500,000^{‡}
^{‡} Sales+streaming figures based on certification alone.
