= None of Your Concern =

2019 single by Jhené Aiko featuring Big Sean

Single by Jhené Aiko featuring Big Sean

from the album Chilombo
- Released: November 15, 2019
- Genre: R&B
- Length: 4:19
- Label: ArtClub; ARTium; Def Jam
- Songwriters: Jhené Aiko Chilombo; Sean Anderson; Brian Keith Warfield; Maclean Robinson
- Producer: Fisticuffs

Jhené Aiko singles chronology
"Single Again" (2019)	"None of Your Concern" (2019)	"Pussy Fairy (OTW)" (2020)

Big Sean singles chronology
"Bezerk" (2019)	"None of Your Concern" (2019)	"Deep Reverence" (2020)

Music video
- "None of Your Concern" on YouTube

"None of Your Concern" is a song by American singer Jhené Aiko, released as the second single on November 15, 2019 for her third studio album Chilombo (2020). The song features American rapper Big Sean and uncredited vocals from Ty Dolla Sign.

== Background ==
The song is the second collaboration between Jhené Aiko and Big Sean since they broke up, the first being on Sean's song "Single Again". The ex-couple reflect on their failed relationship and decide how to move on. Sean talks about the pain of seeing Aiko move on and how he misses her.

== Charts ==
Chart (2020)	Peak position
New Zealand Hot Singles (Recorded Music NZ)	25
UK Singles (Official Charts Company)	97
US Billboard Hot 100	55
US Hot R&B/Hip-Hop Songs (Billboard)	26

== Certifications ==
Region	Certification	Certified units/sales
United States (RIAA)	2× Platinum	2,000,000^{‡}
^{‡} Sales+streaming figures based on certification alone.
