= No Favors (Big Sean song) =

Song by Big Sean featuring Eminem

from the album I Decided
- Released: February 3, 2017
- Recorded: 2016–2017
- Genre: Hardcore hip hop
- Length: 5:25
- Label: GOOD; Def Jam
- Songwriters: Sean Anderson; Francis Nguyen-Tran; Mark Sebastian; Brittany Hazzard; Steve Boone; Marshall Mathers III; Ebony Oshunrinde; John Sebastian
- Producers: WondaGurl; Big Sean; FrancisGotHeat

"No Favors" is a song by American rapper Big Sean featuring fellow American rapper Eminem for his fourth studio album I Decided (2017). The song was written by Big Sean, Francis Nguyen-Tran, Mark Sebastian, Starrah, The Lovin' Spoonful, Eminem, WondaGurl and John Sebastian and was produced by WondaGurl, Big Sean, and FrancisGotHeat. This song contains samples from "Summer in the City", performed by Quincy Jones featuring Valerie Simpson and was written by Mark Sebastian, Steve Boone and John Sebastian. The song debuted at number 22 on the US Billboard Hot 100, and was later certified platinum by the Recording Industry Association of America (RIAA) on February 12, 2021.

== Controversy ==
In Eminem's verse, he mentions President Donald Trump and says "I'm anti, can't no government handle a commando / Your man don't want it, Trump's a bitch / I'll make his whole brand go under". Eminem also mentions American pop star Fergie, actress Jamie Lee Curtis, and conservative political commentator Ann Coulter.

== Charts ==
Chart (2017)	Peak position
Australia (ARIA)	77
Canada Hot 100 (Billboard)	34
New Zealand Heatseekers (RMNZ)	2
UK Singles (OCC)	56
UK Hip Hop/R&B (OCC)	8
US Billboard Hot 100	22
US Hot R&B/Hip-Hop Songs (Billboard)	11

== Certifications ==
Region	Certification	Certified units/sales
United States (RIAA)	Platinum	1,000,000^{‡}
^{‡} Sales+streaming figures based on certification alone.
