= Bounce Back (Big Sean song) =

2016 single by Big Sean

Single by Big Sean

from the album I Decided
- Released: October 31, 2016
- Recorded: 2016
- Genre: Hip-hop; trap
- Length: 3:43
- Label: GOOD; Def Jam
- Songwriters: Sean Anderson; Kanye West; Leland Wayne; Jeremy Felton; Christian Ward; Samuel Jimenez; Amaire Johnson
- Producers: Metro Boomin; Hitmaka; Amaire Johnson; Smash David

Big Sean singles chronology
| "Holy Key" (2016) | "Bounce Back" (2016) | "Castro" (2016) |

Music video
- "Bounce Back" on YouTube

"Bounce Back" is a song by American rapper Big Sean, serving as the lead single from his fourth album, I Decided (2017). The song was produced by Hitmaka, Smash David, Metro Boomin, and Amaire Johnson. It features additional vocals from label boss Kanye West and American singer Jeremih. It also has the subtitle "Take No L's", which is featured on the single's cover. This song was released on October 31, 2016. The single received a nomination for Best Rap Performance at the 60th Annual Grammy Awards.

== Background and composition ==
Big Sean teased "Bounce Back" on his social media in early October 2016. Hitmaka and Smash David also teased the song on their respective Instagram accounts a couple weeks before its release. On October 30, 2016, he announced on his Twitter account that he would be releasing new music soon. On the following day, Sean released "Bounce Back" along with "No More Interviews" for digital download through GOOD Music and Def Jam Recordings.

"Bounce Back" is a trap-influenced hip-hop song, written in the key of C♯ minor, and a tempo of 81.2 BPM.

== Commercial performance ==
"Bounce Back" has peaked at number six on the Billboard Hot 100, becoming Big Sean's highest charting single to date. As of March 19, 2017, it has sold 374,000 copies in the United States and has been certified six-times platinum by the Recording Industry Association of America (RIAA) for sales of over six million digital units.

== Music video ==
The music video for the song, directed by Glenn Michael and Christo Anesti, premiered on December 12, 2016, via Sean's Vevo channel. In 2017, the video was nominated for Video of the Year at the BET Awards and for Best Hip-Hop Video at the MTV Video Music Awards.

== Live performances ==
On October 31, 2016, Sean performed the song along with "No More Interviews" on The Tonight Show Starring Jimmy Fallon. He went on to perform the song (along with "Sunday Morning Jetpack") on Saturday Night Live on January 21, 2017.

== Controversy ==
Record producer TM88 claimed on his Twitter account that he did not get credited for his alleged work on "Bounce Back", due to producing a song with one of the same producers on the song, "Smash David", on another song released earlier called "Act" by Juicy J, with the same beat elements and composition in that song that were used for "Bounce Back". TM88 later dissed all of the producers on the song except Metro Boomin, whom TM88 called "his brother", since they had collaborated numerous times before.

== Charts ==
=== Weekly charts ===
| Chart (2016–17) | Peak position |
|---|---|
| Australia (ARIA) | 52 |
| Australia Urban (ARIA) | 5 |
| Canada (Canadian Hot 100) | 17 |
| Ireland (IRMA) | 73 |
| Netherlands (Single Top 100) | 78 |
| New Zealand (Recorded Music NZ) | 28 |
| Portugal (AFP) | 70 |
| Sweden (Sverigetopplistan) | 97 |
| Switzerland (Schweizer Hitparade) | 78 |
| UK Singles (OCC) | 67 |
| US Billboard Hot 100 | 6 |
| US Hot R&B/Hip-Hop Songs (Billboard) | 3 |
| US Pop Airplay (Billboard) | 19 |
| US Rhythmic Airplay (Billboard) | 1 |

=== Year-end charts ===
| Chart (2017) | Position |
|---|---|
| Canada (Canadian Hot 100) | 99 |
| US Billboard Hot 100 | 35 |
| US Hot R&B/Hip-Hop Songs (Billboard) | 19 |
| US Rhythmic (Billboard) | 6 |

== Certifications ==
| Region | Certification | Certified units/sales |
|---|---|---|
| Australia (ARIA) | 2× Platinum | 140,000^{‡} |
| Canada (Music Canada) | 2× Platinum | 160,000^{‡} |
| Denmark (IFPI Danmark) | Gold | 45,000^{‡} |
| New Zealand (RMNZ) | 2× Platinum | 60,000^{‡} |
| United Kingdom (BPI) | Gold | 400,000^{‡} |
| United States (RIAA) | 6× Platinum | 6,000,000^{‡} |
^{‡} Sales+streaming figures based on certification alone.

== Release history ==
| Region | Date | Format | Label |
|---|---|---|---|
| United States | November 8, 2016 | Rhythmic and Urban contemporary radio | GOOD; Def Jam |
