= Soul Burger =

Studio album by Ab-Soul
- Released: November 8, 2024
- Recorded: February 15, 2023 – 2024
- Genre: Hip-hop
- Length: 53:54
- Label: TDE
- Producer: 9th Wonder; Andrew Boyd; Aziz the Shake; Banshee the Great; Beat Butcha; Bentley Haze; Crooklin; D.Sharp; Amaire Johnson; Kal Banx; Keanu Beats; Low the Great; Devin Malik; Terrace Martin; Nascent; Oasik; Oma; Oren; Peyote; Python P; Qu; Rascal; Schoolboy Q; Skhye Hutch; Sounwave; TaeBeast

Ab-Soul chronology
Herbert (2022)	Soul Burger (2024)

Singles from Soul Burger
- 1. "Squeeze 1st 2" Released: October 11, 2024; 2. "All That" Released: October 18, 2024; 3. "Crazier" Released: October 29, 2024

Soul Burger is the sixth studio album by American rapper Ab-Soul. It was released on November 8, 2024, by Top Dawg Entertainment (TDE). It features guest appearances by Blxst, Doechii, JasonMartin, JID, Lupe Fiasco, Punch, Ty Dolla Sign, Vince Staples, Asia Holiday, Fresh, Kamm Carson, Notorious N.I.Q. and Thirsty P. Production was handled by various record producers, including 9th Wonder, Beat Butcha, Sounwave, and TDE labelmate Schoolboy Q, among others. The album title pays homage to Ab-Soul's best friend Doeburger, who died in December 2021; he is posthumously credited as a writer on all tracks.

Complex listed Soul Burger as the 35th Best Album of 2024.

== Singles ==
On October 11, 2024, the lead single "Squeeze 1st 2" was released; its title and chorus are a reference to the Jay-Z track "Squeeze 1st". "Squeeze 1st 2" later was performed at A Colors Show—a live performance series by German media company ColorsxStudios. "All That" featuring JasonMartin and Thirsty P was released on October 18 as the second single. "Crazier" featuring JID was released on October 29 as the final single, along with the album's official announcement and release date reveal.

== Track listing ==
Soul Burger track listing
No.	Title	Writer(s)	Producer(s)	Length
1.	"9 Mile"	Herbert Anthony Stevens IV; Chris Larcombe; Sam Hewley; Armon Stringer; Andrew Boyd; James Harper; Kevin Pennington; Corben Lamb	Oma; Andrew Boyd; Python P	3:57
2.	"Paiday"	Stevens; Quincy Hanley; Derrick Hutchins, Jr.; Stringer; Boyd; Aziz Dieng; Donte Perkins	Schoolboy Q; Boyd; Aziz the Shake; TaeBeast; Skhye Hutch	2:06
3.	"All That" (featuring JasonMartin and Thirsty P)	Stevens; Jason Martin; Percy Wilkins; Tobias Breuer; Perkins	Rascal; TaeBeast	3:01
4.	"California Dream" (featuring Vince Staples and Kamm Carson)	Stevens; Vincent Staples; Kameron Small; Patrick Douthit; Deangelo Smith; Stringer	9th Wonder; Low the Great	3:21
5.	"B.U.C.K.O. Jr."	Stevens; Stringer; Boyd; Pennington	Boyd; Python P	4:33
6.	"I, Myself & Me" (with Doechii)	Stevens; Jaylah Hickmon; Anh-Quoc Doan; Stringer; Boyd; Perkins; Miles Franklin	Boyd; Qu; TaeBeast; Oasik	3:41
7.	"Dnd" (featuring Notorious N.I.Q.)	Stevens; Antonique Hess; Eliot Dubock; Mark Spears; Stringer; Breuer; Perkins	Beat Butcha; Rascal; Sounwave	3:22
8.	"Don Julio 70" (featuring Fresh)	Stevens; Supreme Williams; Christopher Ruelas; Stringer	Nascent	2:10
9.	"Go Pro" (with Ty Dolla Sign)	Stevens; Tyrone Griffin, Jr.; Bentley Hazelwood; Stringer	Bentley Haze	2:59
10.	"Saudi Sweats"	Stevens; Oren Yoel; Devin Williams; Stringer; Perkins	Oren; TaeBeast; Devin Malik	4:14
11.	"Squeeze 1st 2"	Stevens; Boyd; Russell Craig Scott-Wood; Stringer	Boyd; Crooklin	3:51
12.	"Crazier" (with JID)	Stevens; Destin Route; Kalon Berry; Stringer; Solal Tong Cuong; Keanu Torres	Kal Banx; Banshee the Great; Keanu Beats	2:49
13.	"Peace" (featuring Lupe Fiasco and Punch)	Stevens; Wasalu Muhammad Jaco; Terrence Henderson; Amaire Johnson; Pennington; Hutchins; Stringer	Amaire Johnson; Python P; Skhye Hutch	5:42
14.	"The Sky Is Limitless" (featuring Blxst and Asia Holiday)	Stevens; Matthew Dean Burdette; Asia Holiday; David Wisdom Sharber; Terrace Martin; Pennington; Stringer; Armen Zabounian	Peyote; Terrace Martin; Python P; D.Sharp	3:32
15.	"Righteous Man"	Stevens; Martin; Josef Leimberg; Pennington; Stringer	Leimberg; Martin; Python P	4:30
Total length:				53:54

== Personnel ==
- Ab-Soul – vocals
- Nicolas de Porcel – mastering
- Andrew Boyd – mixing
- Kayla Holland – production assistance
- Joey Badass – background vocals on "9 Mile"
- Matthew Tucker – background vocals on "California Dream"
- Kal Banx – background vocals on "B.U.C.K.O. Jr"
- Python P – background vocals on "B.U.C.K.O. Jr"
- Ashley Iams – background vocals on "Dnd"
- Kembe X – background vocals on "Dnd"
- Reason – background vocals on "Don Julio 70"
- Slick Jackson – background vocals on "Saudi Sweats"
- DoeBurger – background vocals on "Squeeze 1st 2"
- Mick Jenkins – background vocals on "Squeeze 1st 2"
- Madzilla – background vocals on "Peace"
- Zacari – background vocals on "Peace"
