= Hummingbird (Black Party album) =

2022 studio album

Studio album by Black Party
- Released: August 5, 2022
- Genres: R&B; soul
- Length: 37:56
- Labels: Wolf + Rothstein; RCA
- Producers: Amaire Johnson; Beat Butcha; Black Party; BlackSamurai; Dad; EZM; Lido; Willy Will Yanez

Black Party chronology
Birds & Bees (2021)	Hummingbird (2022)	The Last Dance (2025)

Singles from Hummingbird
- 1. "Hotline" Released: May 12, 2022; 2. "On My Way" Released: June 16, 2022; 3. "I Love You More Than You Know" Released: August 4, 2022

Hummingbird is the third studio album by American R&B singer Black Party, released August 5, 2022 by Wolf + Rothstein and RCA Records.

== Background ==
The album was first announced June 16 for a July 14 release date, and was preceded by three singles: "Hotline", released May 12; "On My Way", released June 16; and "I Love You More Than You Know", released August 4. Black Party described the album as being "a journey about self-love, romantic love and parental love" which "represents the evolution of human experience", and that the artist "hope[s] the listener finds the full spectrum of emotion from heartbreak to finding self-confidence to sheer joy while listening."

In an interview with GQ's Grant Rindner, Black Party explained the origin of the album's name as having to do with him continuously encountering the titular bird and finding "the parallel between the flight patterns and lifestyles of hummingbirds and my own", where the birds "don't stop very often" and humans typically only see them in motion, as well as discovering that hummingbirds are "a machismo type bird" that perform masculinity through "extreme flying stunts and tricks" in order to attract mates, something also commonly expected of human men. He also explained how he was inspired by films such as City of God, Coffy, Shaft, and the Truman Show; and how having his family in the studio made the process surprisingly easier because "I know them more than I know anybody else, so there's never a clash, because everybody has the same mindset of just, the studio is a place of humility. The ego goes out the door, like when you're working on records you just have to focus on the music. The music is the priority, not necessarily how you feel about a thing. At the end of the day, the song has to be good. So it mostly feels seamless, it never feels like too many cooks in the kitchen."

== Style and reception ==
Soul Bounce's Ivory calls the album "smooth ride from start to finish, albeit a short one with the album clocking in at just under 38 minutes", though with that brief running time "Black Party makes the most of each second while leaving listeners longing for more." The artist "manages to maintain his ultra-cool persona" throughout the release, such as on songs like "Blues" and "She's Gone" where he's "lamenting love lost", "sexier" songs such as "Ride" which he "handles ... with equal aplomb, his voice lying somewhere between a growl and a whisper as he trades verses with singer Jean Deaux", or on "Bomb" and the "bouncy" "Kemet" where his "quiet swag takes centerstage". The "lush and dreamy" closing track "I Love You More Than You Know" "finds Childish Gambino taking the lead as he pours his heart out about his late father" and is "both a quietly emotional yet beautiful way to close out the latest release from the LA-based crooner."

Ones to Watch's Jazmin Kylene writes that "from its most tempestuous nectar to its rancid decay, [Hummingbird] emits hues of yellow and orange, of slept-in mornings and gentle breeze, of regretted voice notes and lust-stained sheets." The album is "an honest one, yet remains both playful and light", and while the album involves an "impressive lineup of features" that "deepen its range", including Saba and Gwen Bunn, they don't "distract from Black Party's own artistic evolution." GQ's Grant Rindner writes that "Hummingbird features some of [Black Party]'s best singing, as he glides across simmering guitar chords and jazzy electric piano chords, recalling artists like Syd or his frequent collaborator Donald Glover", and that the album features "an eclectic mix of tones and textures" such as the "endearingly quirky" "Blues", "nimble, combine ladder drill raps" of "Bomb", the "kaleidoscope psychedelia of "I Love You More Than You Know", and the "steamy love song set against the backdrop of the looming apocalypse" "WW3".

== Track listing ==
All tracks are written by Malik Flint, except for lyrics on track 6, with others noted.

Hummingbird track listing
No.	Title	Writer(s)	Producers	Length
1.	"Blues"	Rumeal Eggleston	BlackSamurai; Black Party	2:55
2.	"She's Gone"	Eliot Dubock; Kevin Flint; William Yanez	Beat Butcha; Willy Will Yanez; Black Party (Note: Miscellaneous producer)	3:29
3.	"Hotline"	Peder Losnegård	Lido	2:28
4.	"Soakin" (featuring Gwen Bunn)	Eric Egwuonwu; Bunn; Ian Evans; Eggleston	BlackSamurai; EZM; Evans; Black Party	4:00
5.	"On My Way"	Dubock; K. Flint; Yanez	Yanez; Black Party; Beat Butcha	2:44
6.	"WW3"	K. Flint; Marcus Flint; Eggleston; Y. Machelle Smith-Flint	BlackSamurai; Black Party	2:39
7.	"Down 4 Me"	Dubock; K. Flint; Marcus Flint; Sharina Isamar Castillo; Yanez	Beat Butcha; Yanez	3:30
8.	"Bomb" (featuring Kari Faux)	Kari Rose Johnson; Eggleston	Amaire Johnson; BlackSamurai; Black Party	3:23
9.	"Flame" (featuring DMP Jefe and Zoe)	Dubock; Miles Flint; Yanez; Zoe Flint	Beat Butcha; Yanez; Black Party	2:51
10.	"Kemet" (featuring Saba)	Eggleston; Tahj Chandler	BlackSamurai	2:44
11.	"Ride" (featuring Jean Deaux)	Egwuonwu; Deaux; Eggleston; Rutherford "Dad" Allison	Dad; BlackSamurai; EZM	2:50
12.	"I Love You More Than You Know" (featuring Childish Gambino)	Donald Glover; Losnegård	Lido; Black Party	4:23
Total length:				37:56

== Personnel ==
- Black Party – vocals, mixing engineer (1–7, 9, 10)
- Gwen Bunn – vocals (4)
- Kari Faux – vocals (8)
- DMP Jefe – vocals (9)
- Zoe Flint – vocals (9)
- Saba – vocals (10)
- Jean Deaux – vocals (11)
- Childish Gambino – vocals (12)
- Rutherford Allison – background vocals (4)
- Ellis Tucker – mastering engineer (1, 2, 5–12), mixing engineer (8, 11, 12)
- Dave Kutch – mastering engineer (3, 4)
- Riley Macklin – recording engineer (12)
