= So Good (Jhené Aiko song) =

2026 song by Jhené Aiko featuring Kendrick Lamar

Single by Jhené Aiko featuring Kendrick Lamar

from the album Westside Whimsy
- Released: September 25, 2026
- Genre: R&B
- Length: 3:57
- Label: ArtClub; Def Jam
- Songwriters: Jhené Aiko Efuru Chilombo; Kendrick Duckworth; Jahaan Sweet; Matthew Bernard; Ruchaun Akers Jr.; Mark Spears
- Producers: Sweet; MTech; Scott Bridgeway; Sounwave

Jhené Aiko singles chronology
"California Dream" (2026)	"So Good" (2026)

Kendrick Lamar singles chronology
"Good Flirts" (2026)	"So Good" (2026)

"So Good" is a song by American singer Jhené Aiko featuring American rapper Kendrick Lamar. It was sent to Italian radio on September 25, 2026 as the second single from Aiko's fourth studio album Westside Whimsy (2026). The song was produced by Jahaan Sweet, MTech, Scott Bridgeway and Sounwave.

== Composition ==
The song finds the artists swapping verses and combining their vocals. as they sing about perfect love. Later in the song, Lamar adopts a laid-back flow that matches with Aiko's.

== Reception ==
Writing for HotNewHipHop, Tallie Spencer commented that Aiko's "smooth, laid-back approach" pairs "naturally" with Lamar's vocals, while stating that he "adds another layer to the record without taking away from its dreamy feel."

== Charts ==
Chart performance for "So Good"
Chart (2026)	Peak position
Canada Hot 100 (Billboard)	72
Global 200 (Billboard)	89
Jamaica Airplay (JAMMS)	2
New Zealand Hot Singles (RMNZ)	2
Nigeria (TurnTable Top 100)	72
South Africa Airplay (TOSAC)	14
South Africa Streaming (TOSAC)	3
US Billboard Hot 100	26
US Hot R&B/Hip-Hop Songs (Billboard)	5
US Rhythmic Airplay (Billboard)	1
