= Chilombo (album) =

Studio album by Jhené Aiko
- Released: March 6, 2020
- Recorded: 2019 – January 2020
- Genre: Neo soul
- Length: 63:26
- Labels: ArtClub; ARTium; Def Jam
- Producers: Jhené Aiko; Fisticuffs; Lejkeys; Micah Powell; Heavy Mellow

Jhené Aiko chronology
| Trip (2017) | Chilombo (2020) | Westside Whimsy (2026) |

Deluxe edition cover

Singles from Chilombo
- 1. "Triggered (Freestyle)" Released: May 8, 2019; 2. "None of Your Concern" Released: November 15, 2019; 3. "Pussy Fairy (OTW)" Released: January 16, 2020; 4. "Happiness Over Everything (H.O.E.)" Released: February 26, 2020; 5. "B.S." Released: March 6, 2020

Chilombo is the third studio album by American singer Jhené Aiko. It was released on March 6, 2020, by ArtClub International, ARTium Recordings, and Def Jam Recordings. Following the release of Trip and her split with rapper Big Sean, with whom she formed the duo Twenty88, Aiko began work on Chilombo. Recorded as a freestyle in Hawaii, the album was inspired by the island's natural landscape and features traditional singing bowls to create a tranquil effect. In order to create her desired sound, Aiko served as the album's executive producer, enlisting the help of long time collaborators Fisticuffs and Lejkeys, who produced eighteen of the album's songs. The album featured a range of guests including rappers Nas, Ab-Soul, Big Sean and Future, as well as R&B singers Ty Dolla $ign, John Legend, Miguel, and H.E.R. The deluxe edition of the album was released on July 17, 2020, and includes appearances from Kehlani, Mila J, Chris Brown, Snoop Dogg and Wiz Khalifa.

Chilombo received generally positive reviews from critics and was a commercial success. The album debuted at number two on the US Billboard 200 chart, earning 152,000 album-equivalent units in its first week. It was also certified platinum by the Recording Industry Association of America (RIAA) in January 2021. At the 63rd Annual Grammy Awards, the album received three nominations: Album of the Year and Best Progressive R&B Album, and Best R&B Performance for "Lightning & Thunder".

== Background ==
Two years after the release of her second studio album Trip (2017), Aiko announced she had begun work on the follow-up album. She revealed that her third album would only consist of freestyles and focus on relationships, stating "my next album is all freestyles where i touch on many subjects and relationships... past, present and future." In 2019 Aiko had completed three songs for the album as well as releasing the taster "Wasted Love Freestyle". Speculation led the media to believe the album would focus on Aiko's breakup with rapper Big Sean.

== Recording ==
Aiko recorded the album on the big island of Hawaii, and free-styled all the songs creating what she described as one "free-flowing jam session". Aiko was inspired by Hawaii volcanoes, which she likened herself to during the conception and recording of the album. She continued to describe the album as an "eruption", starting with "Triggered", creating a "flow" throughout the album. The album's writing process followed a structure, with all songs beginning as a freestyle. Aiko would initially start the process with lyrics in her head, before meeting long time collaborators and producers Fisticuffs or her keyboard player. From there they would "build" the music around the freestyle. "Triggered (Freestyle)" was created from this process, as were all of the album's tracks. Aiko and producers Fisticuffs started the song with a few instruments before Aiko took the production home where she recorded it herself in her studio. Speaking about the whole album process, Aiko said: ”I'm still in transition, but I'm still me,” she said. “I still love to write all types of songs and listen to all types of music, but Chilombo definitely has a lot more acoustic instruments because I wanted it to be music that you can feel.”

During the creative process for the album, Aiko was adamant on incorporating crystal alchemy sound bowls. Her hope was to open up different chakras within the human body. The singing bowls "produce a vibrational hum that resonates throughout the body, producing a calming and tranquil effect. [... They] are a common practice in healing and meditation, as they promote chakra balancing as well as stress and anxiety reduction". Aiko first used the bowls during a recording session at her home and went on to use them on each of the album's songs. This inspired Aiko to incorporate more acoustic instruments and kept the process analogue, allowing the microphone to pick up sounds in the room.

== Songs ==
Chilombo consists of twenty songs and features a variety of guests including rappers Nas, Ab-Soul, Big Sean, and Future, as well as R&B singers Ty Dolla $ign, John Legend, Miguel, and H.E.R. Chilombo is an atmospheric R&B album, that takes influence from quiet storm. The album production features soft and dulled percussion and drifting keys. The album's lyrics focus on the ups and downs of life after a break-up and vaguely tells the story of a woman who has suffered heartbreak before emerging stronger.

"Triggered" is a freestyle rap song about Aiko's conflicted feelings following a breakup and was interpreted as a diss track towards Aiko's ex-boyfriend Big Sean, with whom she formed the duo Twenty88.

"Pussy Fairy (OTW)" is a trap-influenced alternative R&B song. The song's title was inspired by Aiko's relationship with Sean. "Happiness Over Everything (H.O.E.)" features guest vocals from Miguel and Future. The song is an ode to Aiko's 2011 song "Hoe" from her debut mixtape Sailing Soul(s) and references "Where Are My Panties?" by André 3000.

== Release and promotion ==
Chilombo was released on March 6, 2020, to streaming platforms by ArtClub International, ARTium Recordings, and Def Jam Recordings. Aiko followed the same release style as Trip, which is an "off-cycle" streaming strategy. Her team released each song just outside of the window when streaming platforms typically update playlists, which Def Jam GM/executive vice president Rich Isaacson called "liberating from a pressurized playlisting strategy. It's important to her that each track release is its own ecosystem. Jhené and her team feed each one with unique content strategies to prolong the life cycle, and over the course of eight to 10 to 12 months of steady consumption, she racks up really impressive numbers."

To further promote the album Aiko announced she would be embarking on "The Magic Hour" tour. The tour was set to start on May 1 and end on June 27, and would include special guests Queen Naija and Ann Marie. The North American tour would visit cities including New York, Philadelphia, Toronto, and Los Angeles. On May 8, 2020, Aiko announced a deluxe edition of the album that includes additional tracks and a full version of the intro to "Pussy Fairy (OTW)", that was scheduled for a May 2020 release. The deluxe edition was later released on July 17, 2020.

=== Singles ===
On May 8, 2019, Aiko released the album's lead single "Triggered (Freestyle)" which debuted at number fifty-one on the US Billboard Hot 100 and peaked at number 3 on the US R&B Songs. It was the first official single from her 2020 album. The freestyle discussed various topics, including her past relationships. There were immediate rumors that the song might have been addressing Aiko's ex-boyfriend, Big Sean. However, Aiko went on Twitter to dispel the rumors about "Triggered (Freestyle)" being a diss track.

"None of Your Concern" featuring Big Sean, was released as the album's second single in November 2019. The song peaked at number 97 in the United Kingdom. "None of Your Concern" peaked at number fifty-five on the US Hot 100. "Pussy Fairy (OTW)" was released as the third single in January 2020 and peaked at number forty on the US Hot 100.

== Critical reception ==
Professional ratings
Review scores
| Source | Rating |
|---|---|
| AllMusic | 4/5 stars |
| The Guardian | 3/5 stars |
| Pitchfork | 6.3/10 |

Stephen Kearse for Pitchfork felt that "Aiko's music too often lacks a pulse", citing that "Chilombo gestures at this larger skill set, but settles for good vibes. It's very chill, and nothing else." In a review for The Guardian, Laura Snapes stated that "Chilombo is sexual, spiritual and wildly over-long", also writing that "Unfortunately, neither Aiko's narrative nor the fairly one-note production can sustain that focus across this wildly over-long record. It lacks the variety of Trip, and could do with more moments like One Way Street, which sets Aiko's existential breakdown to a dubby gleam, or the raw Born Tired, where a simple acoustic guitar motif showcases her vocal range. And while you obviously wish Aiko happiness after her breakup, it's disappointing, after the enjoyably visceral put-downs of the first half, that the album seems to conclude with a reconciliation, rendered in never-ending, luscious rhapsodies that keep coming like a film that doesn't know how to end."

=== Accolades ===
Accolades for Chilombo
| Publication | Accolade | Rank | Ref. |
|---|---|---|---|
| Billboard | Billboard's 50 Best Albums of 2020 – Mid-Year | —N/a | |
| HipHopDX | HipHopDX's Best R&B Albums of 2020 – Mid-Year | —N/a | |
| Uproxx | The Best R&B Albums of 2020 | 4 | |

=== Grammy Awards ===
| Year | Nominee / work | Award | Result |
|---|---|---|---|
| 2021 | Chilombo | Album of the Year | Nominated |
| 2021 | Chilombo | Best Progressive R&B Album | Nominated |
| 2021 | "Lightning & Thunder" | Best R&B Performance | Nominated |

== Commercial performance ==
Chilombo debuted at number two on the US Billboard 200 chart, earning 152,000 album-equivalent units, (including 38,000 copies as pure album sales) in its first week. This became Aiko's fifth US top-ten album, her highest-charting album in the US and her highest first-week sales in the region. In its second week, the album dropped to number five on the chart, earning an additional 56,000 units. In its third week, the album dropped to number eight on the chart, earning 37,000 more units. In its fifth week, the album returned to the top-ten, at number ten on the chart, earning 27,000 units. As of December 2020, the album has earned over 1,032,000 album-equivalent units and has sold 81,000 copies as pure album sales in the US. On January 11, 2021, the album was certified platinum by Recording Industry Association of America (RIAA) for combined sales and album-equivalent units of over a million units in the United States.

In the United Kingdom, the album debuted at number 13 on the UK Albums Chart, becoming Aiko's highest-charting album and first top 20 in the region. In Canada, the album peaked at number seven on the Canadian Albums Chart, becoming Aiko's first top-ten album there.

== Track listing ==
Chilombo track listing
| No. | Title | Writer(s) | Producer(s) | Length |
|---|---|---|---|---|
| 1. | "Lotus (Intro)" | Jhené Aiko Chilombo; Julian-Quán Việt Lê | Lejkeys | 1:13 |
| 2. | "Triggered (Freestyle)" | Jh. Chilombo; Brian Keith Warfield; Lê; Maclean Robinson; Ross James | Fisticuffs; Lejkeys | 3:30 |
| 3. | "None of Your Concern" (featuring Big Sean) | Jh. Chilombo; Sean Anderson; Warfield; Robinson | Fisticuffs | 4:19 |
| 4. | "Speak" | Jh. Chilombo; Warfield; Lê; Robinson | Fisticuffs; Lejkeys | 3:05 |
| 5. | "B.S." (featuring H.E.R.) | Jh. Chilombo; Gabriella Wilson; Warfield; Robinson; Anderson | Fisticuffs | 3:33 |
| 6. | "Pussy Fairy (OTW)" | Jh. Chilombo; Lê; Micah Powell | Fisticuffs; Lejkeys | 3:41 |
| 7. | "Happiness Over Everything (H.O.E.)" (featuring Future and Miguel) | Jh. Chilombo; Nayvadius Wilburn; Miguel Pimentel; Andre Benjamin; Warfield; Robinson | Fisticuffs | 3:08 |
| 8. | "One Way St." (featuring Ab-Soul) | Jh. Chilombo; Lê | Lejkeys | 2:54 |
| 9. | "Define Me" (interlude) | Jh. Chilombo | Jhené Aiko | 1:49 |
| 10. | "Surrender" (featuring Dr. Chill) | Jh. Chilombo; Kharamo Chilombo; Warfield; Robinson | Fisticuffs | 4:18 |
| 11. | "Tryna Smoke" | Jh. Chilombo; Powell | Micah Powell; Heavy Mellow | 4:30 |
| 12. | "Born Tired" | Jh. Chilombo; Warfield; Robinson | Fisticuffs | 3:15 |
| 13. | "Love" | Jh. Chilombo; Warfield; Lê; Robinson | Fisticuffs; Lejkeys | 2:36 |
| 14. | "10k Hours" (featuring Nas) | Jh. Chilombo; Nasir Jones; Lê | Lejkeys | 4:18 |
| 15. | "Summer 2020" (interlude) | Jh. Chilombo; Lê | Lejkeys | 1:46 |
| 16. | "Mourning Doves" | Jh. Chilombo; Lê | Lejkeys | 2:48 |
| 17. | "Pray for You" | Jh. Chilombo; Lê | Lejkeys | 1:40 |
| 18. | "Lightning & Thunder" (featuring John Legend) | Jh. Chilombo; John Stephens; Warfield; Lê; Robinson; James | Fisticuffs; Lejkeys | 4:30 |
| 19. | "Magic Hour" | Jh. Chilombo; Lê | Lejkeys | 3:16 |
| 20. | "Party for Me (West Coast Version)" (featuring Ty Dolla Sign) | Jh. Chilombo; Tyrone Griffin, Jr.; Lê | Lejkeys | 3:26 |
| Total length: | | | | 63:34 |

Chilombo – CD version
| No. | Title | Writer(s) | Producer(s) | Length |
|---|---|---|---|---|
| 20. | "Party for Me (Outro)" | Jh. Chilombo | Lejkeys | 1:34 |
| Total length: | | | | 61:42 |

Chilombo – deluxe edition bonus tracks
| No. | Title | Writer(s) | Producer(s) | Length |
|---|---|---|---|---|
| 21. | "Above and Beyond (Piano)" | Jh. Chilombo; Warfield; Robinson | Fisticuffs | 2:50 |
| 22. | "Above and Beyond" | Jh. Chilombo; Warfield; Robinson | Fisticuffs | 3:26 |
| 23. | "B.S." (Remix) (featuring Kehlani) | Jh. Chilombo; Kehlani Parrish; Warfield; Robinson; Anderson | Fisticuffs | 3:32 |
| 24. | "All Good" | Jh. Chilombo; Warfield; Lê; Robinson | Fisticuffs; Lejkeys | 2:43 |
| 25. | "Come On" | Jh. Chilombo; Warfield; Lê; Robinson | Fisticuffs; Lejkeys | 2:34 |
| 26. | "On the Way" (featuring Mila J) | Jh. Chilombo; Jamila Chilombo; Warfield; Lê; Robinson | Fisticuffs; Lejkeys | 3:42 |
| 27. | "Tryna Smoke" (Remix) (featuring Chris Brown and Snoop Dogg) | Jh. Chilombo; Calvin Broadus Jr.; Greg Edwards; Powell | Powell; Heavy Mellow | 4:32 |
| 28. | "Down Again" (featuring Wiz Khalifa) | Jh. Chilombo; Cameron Thomaz; Warfield; Robinson | Fisticuffs | 2:18 |
| 29. | "Summer 2020" | Jh. Chilombo; Warfield; Lê; Robinson; Ronald Bell; Robert Bell; George Brown; Robert Mickens; Claydes Smith; Alton Taylor; Dennis Thomas; Ricky West | Aiko; Fisticuffs; Lejkeys | 3:16 |
| Total length: | | | | 92:34 |

Notes

- Physical copies of the album include a shorter version of "Party for Me" which does not feature Ty Dolla Sign.
- "Pussy Fairy (OTW)" is stylised as "P*$$Y Fairy (OTW)".
- "Love" is stylised as "LOVE".
- "On the Way" is an alternate version of "Pussy Fairy (OTW)"

Sample credits

- "Happiness Over Everything (H.O.E.)" contains interpolations of "Where Are My Panties? (Interlude)", written by Andre Benjamin, and performed by André 3000; and interpolations of "Hoe", written by Jhené Aiko Chilombo, Miguel Pimentel and Radric Davis, and performed by Jhené Aiko.
- "Summer 2020" contains a sample of "Summer Madness", written by Ronald Bell, Robert Bell, George Brown, Robert Mickens, Claydes Smith, Alton Taylor, Dennis Thomas and Ricky West, and performed by Kool & the Gang.

== Personnel ==
Credits adapted from Tidal.

Performers

- Monro – additional keyboards (1)
- Julian-Quán Việt Lê – additional keyboards (3, 7, 10), programming (12, 22, 28), flute (13), horn arrangement (14), string arrangement (16)
- Big Sean – background vocals (3)
- Ty Dolla Sign – background vocals (3)
- Steve Wyreman – guitar (3, 19)
- Jonah Levine – guitar (3), trombone (14)
- Victor San Pedro – guitar (3, 13, 18)
- Gracie Sprout – harp (3, 7, 19, 21)
- Dr. Chill – drums (10)
- Heavy Mellow – guitar (11, 27)
- Robert "Bubby" Lewis – electric bass (12, 19, 25, 29)
- Orbel Babayan – guitar (12)
- Brian Warfield – trumpet (14), additional keyboards (21)
- Fisticuffs – programming (15, 17, 20)
- Megan Shung – viola, violin (16)
- Asa Watkins – drums (18)
- Gregg Rominiecki – drums (19)

Technical

- Dave Kutch – mastering engineer
- Gregg Rominiecki – mixer (1, 3–29), recording engineer (1, 4, 5, 7–29)
- Zeke Mishanec – recording engineer (1–4, 8, 10, 12–14, 16, 18, 19, 21–26, 28, 29), mixer (2)
- Julian-Quán Việt Lê – recording engineer (1, 4, 6, 8, 9, 12–22, 24–26, 28)
- Christian Plata – recording engineer (2–7, 10, 12, 18, 21–26, 28, 29)
- Fisticuffs – recording engineer (2–7, 9, 10, 12–16, 18, 19, 21–26, 28, 29)
- Miki Tsutsumi – recording engineer (5)
- Andy Guerrero – assistant recording engineer (1, 4–29)
- Trey Pearce – assistant recording engineer (1, 4–29)
- Alex Pyle – assistant recording engineer (5)
- Brian Cruz – assistant recording engineer (11)
- Johnny Morgan – assistant recording engineer (24, 29)

== Charts ==
=== Weekly charts ===
Chart performance for Chilombo
| Chart (2020) | Peak position |
|---|---|
| Australian Albums (ARIA) | 29 |
| Belgian Albums (Ultratop Flanders) | 118 |
| Canadian Albums (Billboard) | 7 |
| Dutch Albums (Album Top 100) | 40 |
| French Albums (SNEP) | 102 |
| Irish Albums (IRMA) | 95 |
| New Zealand Albums (RMNZ) | 23 |
| Swiss Albums (Schweizer Hitparade) | 72 |
| UK Albums (Official Charts) | 13 |
| US Billboard 200 | 2 |
| US Top R&B/Hip-Hop Albums (Billboard) | 2 |

=== Year-end charts ===
2020 year-end chart performance for Chilombo
| Chart (2020) | Position |
|---|---|
| US Billboard 200 | 36 |
| US Top R&B/Hip-Hop Albums (Billboard) | 19 |

2021 year-end chart performance for Chilombo
| Chart (2021) | Position |
|---|---|
| US Billboard 200 | 75 |
| US Top R&B/Hip-Hop Albums (Billboard) | 53 |

== Certifications ==
Certifications and sales for Chilombo
| Region | Certification | Certified units/sales |
|---|---|---|
| New Zealand (RMNZ) | Gold | 7,500^{‡} |
| United Kingdom (BPI) | Silver | 60,000^{‡} |
| United States (RIAA) | Platinum | 1,000,000^{‡} |
^{‡} Sales+streaming figures based on certification alone.

== Release history ==
List of release dates, showing region, formats, label, editions and reference
| Region | Date | Format(s) | Version | Label | Ref. |
|---|---|---|---|---|---|
| Various | March 6, 2020 | Digital download; CD; streaming | Standard | ArtClub International; ARTium Recordings; Def Jam Recordings | |
| Various | July 17, 2020 | Digital download; streaming | Deluxe | ArtClub International; ARTium Recordings; Def Jam Recordings | |
| Various | January 22, 2021 | LP | Deluxe | ArtClub International; ARTium Recordings; Def Jam Recordings | |
