= Black Party =

American R&B and soul singer

- Born: 1992 (age 32–33)
- Genres: Rhythm and blues; soul
- Years active: 2011–present
- Labels: RCA; Wolf + Rothstein
- Website: soundcloud.com/blackpartypresents

Malik Perry Flint, known professionally as Black Party (stylized as "bLAck pARty") is an American singer, songwriter, and producer. Originally based in Little Rock, Arkansas and now living in Los Angeles, he is from a military family that moved to Arkansas in 2008.

He began his musical life by playing trumpet in middle school bands, and by high school had taught himself guitar, keyboards, and bass, as well as engineering and recording. He DJ-ed, promoted shows, and performed in hip-hop groups.

In 2011, while a senior at Bryant High School, Flint launched rap-rock group Flint Eastwood with guitarist Marcus Meier, drummer Philip Cottingham, bassist Tyler Inmon, and keyboardist Jon-Michael Harper. Malik was the lead vocalist/rapper. The band name was a play on his last name, Flint. The band released a six-song EP, Hometown Glory, in July 2012, followed by a full-length album titled Flint Eastwood in December of that year. Their tour history included opening for MGK, Big K.R.I.T., Bush, Nappy Roots, and others.

After Flint Eastwood broke up, Flint adopted the name Black Party, stylizing it with capital letters to single out "LA" for Los Angeles, where he lives, and "AR" for Arkansas where he was raised. In 2013, he began producing for Kari Faux. (The two had met when both were in their mid-teens). Their collaboration, "No Small Talk," caught the attention of Childish Gambino (Donald Glover), who remixed it and featured it on his STN MTN/Kauai mixtape.

In 2014, Black Party released the mixtape Prototype. He moved to Los Angeles, where Gambino signed him to his Royalty collective. Malik contributed production to Gambino's Grammy Award-winning album "Awaken, My Love!" as well as to tracks on the soundtracks/scores to the TV series Dear White People, Insecure, and Atlanta. He also executive produced Faux's 2016 album Lost en Los Angeles.

In November 2016, he released the nine-track album Mango, describing the music as "tropical funk".

His 2019 album Endless Summer is his first release through Wolf + Rothstein and RCA Records. The first single, "No Complaints," features DMP Jefe and was released May 5, 2019.

Also, in 2019, he collaborated with Jacquie on her song "Grim".

On August 5, 2022, Black Party released his third album Hummingbird.
