= Trip (Jhené Aiko album) =

2017 studio album by Jhené Aiko

Studio album by Jhené Aiko
- Released: September 22, 2017
- Recorded: 2015–2017
- Studios: Fisticuff's Gym (Culver City, California); Your Mom's House (Culver City); 4420 Studios (Los Angeles); United Studios (Los Angeles)
- Genre: R&B
- Length: 85:26
- Labels: ArtClub; ARTium; Def Jam
- Producers: Fisticuffs; Amaire Johnson; Benny Blanco; Cashmere Cat; Dot da Genius; Frank Dukes; John Mayer; Julian-Quan Viet Le; Key Wane; Mali Music; Mike Moore; Mike Zombie; No I.D.; Noel Cadastre; Trakgirl

Jhené Aiko chronology
Twenty88 (2016)	Trip (2017)	Chilombo (2020)

Alternative cover
- Cover art for physical versions

Singles from Trip
- 1. "While We're Young" Released: June 9, 2017; 2. "Sativa" Released: January 22, 2018

Trip is the second studio album by American singer-songwriter Jhené Aiko. It was released on September 22, 2017, by ArtClub International, ARTium, and Def Jam Recordings. It succeeds Aiko's debut album Souled Out (2014), which was released three years prior, and the collaborative album Twenty88 (2016), while releasing numerous non-album singles in between. The production on the album was primarily handled by frequent collaborators Dot da Genius, Fisticuffs, No I.D. and Key Wane, along with several other record producers such as Amaire Johnson, Frank Dukes, Benny Blanco, Cashmere Cat and Mike Zombie. The album also includes guest appearances from Big Sean, Swae Lee, Kurupt, Brandy, Mali Music, Aiko's father, with the moniker, Dr. Chill, Aiko's daughter, Namiko Love, and Chris Brown.

Trip was released without prior announcement, supported by the lead single "While We're Young". Trip received generally positive reviews from critics and was a moderate commercial success. The album debuted at number five on the US Billboard 200 chart, earning 32,000 album-equivalent units in its first week. It was also certified gold by the Recording Industry Association of America (RIAA) in November 2018.

== Background ==
In September 2014, Aiko released her debut album, Souled Out, which was met with critical acclaim and commercial success. In 2016, Aiko collaborated with American rapper Big Sean for the 8-track album Twenty88 as a duo under the same name. Trip was originally announced in under the name TRIP 17, creating anticipation with non-album singles such as "Maniac", "First Fuck" with 6lack, and "Hello Ego" with Chris Brown between 2016 throughout early and mid-2017.

Describing the album's conception, Aiko stated that she wanted to create an album to showcase all of her personalities and express these. The album was inspired by different kinds of trips Aiko has experienced including mental, physical, and psychedelic.

== Composition ==
=== Music and lyrics ===
According to Pitchfork, Trip is a concept album that "aims to translate the hallucinogenic highs of weed, LSD, and shrooms into sound", with "Aiko’s voice [blending] well into the spare, psychedelia-inspired productions".

== Promotion ==
A 23-minute autobiographical film titled after the album was released a day before Trip on September 21, 2017, co-directed by Aiko.

On October 11, 2017, Aiko announced a headlining North American concert tour in support of the album titled "Trip (The Tour)" with Willow Smith, Kitty Cash and Kodie Shane that will take place in November and December 2017, and a European leg was later announced. Aside from her own tour, Aiko toured with American singer-songwriter Lana Del Rey during January 2018 on the LA to the Moon Tour.

=== Singles ===
"While We're Young", premiered on June 8, 2017, along with its music video directed by Jay Ahn. It was released for digital download as the album's lead single on June 9.

A remix of "Sativa", featuring Rae Sremmurd, was released as a single on January 22, 2018. It Peaked At Number 74 At The Billboard Hot 100.

== Critical reception ==
Professional ratings
Review scores
Source	Rating
HipHopDX	3.3/5
Pitchfork	6.7/10

Trey Alston of HipHopDX believed the album to be "a moody yet breezy continuation of [Aiko's] established aesthetic that ultimately lacks growth of her musical capabilities". In a positive review of the album, Pitchfork explains "Trip works because it isn't just about self-medicating or journeying through a grief-ridden mind."

== Commercial performance ==
Trip debuted at number five on the US Billboard 200 chart, earning 32,000 album-equivalent units (including 10,000 copies as pure album sales) in its first week. This became Aiko's fourth US top-ten debut. The album also accumulated a total of 37.8 million on-demand audio streams of the album's songs during the tracking week. On November 29, 2018, the album was certified gold by the Recording Industry Association of America (RIAA) for combined sales and album-equivalent units of over 500,000 units in the United States. In 2018, Trip was ranked as the 126th most popular album of the year on the Billboard 200.

== Track listing ==
Credits adapted from Jhené Aiko's official website.

Trip
No.	Title	Writer(s)	Producer(s)	Length
1.	"LSD"	Jhené Aiko Efuru Chilombo; Oladipo Omishore	Dot da Genius; Mike Moore^{[b]}	1:45
2.	"Jukai"	Chilombo; Brian Warfield; Maclean Robinson	Fisticuffs	4:16
3.	"While We're Young"	Chilombo; Warfield; Robinson	Fisticuffs	3:56
4.	"Moments" (featuring Big Sean)	Chilombo; Amaire Johnson; Sean Anderson	Johnson	2:58
5.	"OLLA (Only Lovers Left Alive)" (featuring Twenty88)	Chilombo; Johnson; Anderson	Johnson	5:48
6.	"When We Love"	Chilombo	Noel Cadastre	4:22
7.	"Sativa" (featuring Swae Lee)	Chilombo; Warfield; Robinson; Aaquil Brown; Khalif Brown	Fisticuffs	4:36
8.	"New Balance"	Chilombo; Julian-Quan Viet Le; Omishore	Dot da Genius; Viet Le	4:39
9.	"Newer Balance (Freestyle)"	Chilombo; Warfield; Robinson	Fisticuffs; John Mayer	1:05
10.	"You Are Here"	Chilombo; Johnson; Warfield; Robinson	Johnson; Fisticuffs^{[a]}	3:39
11.	"Never Call Me" (featuring Kurupt)	Chilombo; Johnson; Benjamin Levin; Magnus Høiberg; Adam Feeney	Benny Blanco; Cashmere Cat; Frank Dukes; Johnson^{[b]}	4:30
12.	"Nobody"	Chilombo; Warfield; Robinson; Omishore	Fisticuffs; Dot da Genius^{[a]}	4:16
13.	"Overstimulated"	Chilombo; Shakari Linder; William Coleman	Trakgirl; Mike Zombie; Johnson^{[b]}	5:19
14.	"Bad Trip (Interlude)"	Chilombo; Omishore; Johnson	Dot da Genius; Johnson^{[b]}	1:59
15.	"Oblivion (Creation)" (featuring Dr. Chill)	Chilombo; Johnson	Johnson; Jhené Aiko^{[b]}	5:50
16.	"Psilocybin (Love in Full Effect)" (featuring Dr. Chill)	Chilombo; Johnson	Johnson; Aiko^{[b]}	7:46
17.	"Mystic Journey (Freestyle)"	Chilombo; Ernest Wilson; Feeney	No I.D.	2:07
18.	"Picture Perfect (Freestyle)"	Chilombo; Viet Le	Viet Le	3:09
19.	"Sing to Me" (featuring Namiko Love)	Chilombo; Dwane M. Weir II	Key Wane	2:27
20.	"Frequency"	Kortney Pollard; Chilombo	Mali Music	3:50
21.	"Ascension" (featuring Brandy)	Chilombo; Omishore; Warfield; Robinson	Fisticuffs; Dot da Genius^{[a]}	3:33
22.	"Trip" (featuring Mali Music)	Pollard; Chilombo	Mali Music	3:36
Total length:				85:26

Trip — Target exclusive version
No.	Title	Writer(s)	Producer(s)	Length
1.	"LSD"	Chilombo; Omishore	Dot da Genius; Moore^{[b]}	1:45
2.	"Jukai"	Chilombo; Warfield; Robinson	Fisticuffs	4:16
3.	"While We're Young"	Chilombo; Warfield; Robinson	Fisticuffs	3:56
4.	"Moments" (featuring Big Sean)	Chilombo; Johnson; Anderson	Johnson	2:58
5.	"OLLA (Only Lovers Left Alive)" (featuring Twenty88)	Chilombo; Johnson; Anderson	Johnson	5:48
6.	"When We Love"	Chilombo	Noel Cadastre	4:22
7.	"Sativa" (featuring Swae Lee)	Chilombo; Warfield; Robinson; Brown	Fisticuffs	4:36
8.	"New Balance"	Chilombo; Viet Le; Omishore	Dot da Genius; Viet Le	4:39
9.	"Newer Balance (Freestyle)"	Chilombo; Warfield; Robinson	Fisticuffs; Mayer	1:05
10.	"You Are Here"	Chilombo; Johnson; Warfield; Robinson	Johnson; Fisticuffs^{[a]}	3:39
11.	"Clear My Mind"	Chilombo; Omishore	Dot da Genius; Woodro Skillson^{[a]}	1:39
12.	"Never Call Me" (featuring Kurupt)	Chilombo; Johnson; Levin; Magnus Hoiberg; Feeney	Benny Blanco; Cashmere Cat; Dukes; Johnson^{[b]}	4:30
13.	"Nobody"	Chilombo; Warfield; Robinson; Omishore	Fisticuffs; Dot da Genius^{[a]}	4:16
14.	"Overstimulated"	Chilombo; Linder; Coleman	Trakgirl; Zombie; Johnson^{[b]}	5:19
15.	"Bad Trip (Interlude)"	Chilombo; Omishore; Johnson	Dot da Genius; Johnson^{[b]}	1:59
16.	"Oblivion (Creation)" (featuring Dr. Chill)	Chilombo; Johnson	Johnson; Jhené Aiko^{[b]}	5:50
17.	"Psilocybin (Love in Full Effect)" (featuring Dr. Chill)	Chilombo; Johnson	Johnson; Aiko^{[b]}	7:46
18.	"Mystic Journey (Freestyle)"	Chilombo; Wilson; Feeney	No I.D.	2:07
19.	"Picture Perfect (Freestyle)"	Chilombo; Viet Le	Viet Le	3:09
20.	"Sing to Me" (featuring Namiko Love)	Chilombo; Weir II	Key Wane	2:27
21.	"Frequency"	Pollard; Chilombo	Mali Music	3:50
22.	"Ascension" (featuring Brandy)	Chilombo; Omishore; Warfield; Robinson	Fisticuffs; Dot da Genius^{[a]}	3:33
23.	"Trip" (featuring Mali Music)	Pollard; Chilombo	Mali Music	3:36
24.	"Hello Ego" (featuring Chris Brown)	Chilombo; Omishore; Warfield; Robinson; Christopher Brown	Dot da Genius; Fisticuffs^{[a]}	3:48

Notes

- ^{^[a]} signifies a co-producer
- ^{^[b]} signifies an additional producer

== Personnel ==
Credits adapted from Tidal and Aiko's website.

Performance

- Jhené Aiko – primary artist
- Big Sean – featured artist (track 4)
- Twenty88 – featured artist (track 5)
- Swae Lee – featured artist (track 7)
- Kurupt – featured artist (track 11)
- Dr. Chill(Karamo chilombo, Jhene's father) – featured artist (tracks 15 and 16)
- Namiko Love(Jhené's daughter) – featured artist (track 19)
- Brandy – featured artist (track 21)
- Mali Music – featured artist (track 22)
- 6LACK – vocals (track 23)
- Chris Brown – featured artist (track 24)

Instrumentation

- Doc Allison – cello (tracks 2, 13, 21)
- Chris Johnson – trombone (tracks 5–6, 15, and 16)
- Sojung Lee – guitar (track 5)
- Jamelle Adisa – trumpet (tracks 5–6, 15, and 16)
- Keith McKelley – tenor saxophone (tracks 5–6, 15, and 16)
- Peter Lee Johnson – talk box (track 5)
- Felix Oquendo – saxophone (tracks 6, 15, and 16)
- John Mayer – bass (tracks 8 and 9), guitar (track 8), electric guitar (track 9)
- David Meyers Jr. – drums (tracks 13 and 15)
- Gracie Spout – harp (tracks 13, 15, and 24)
- Amaire Johnson – ocarina (track 14)
- Bubby – bass (tracks 15–16, and 19)
- Martin Fredriksson – bass (tracks 15 and 16), percussion (track 15)
- Maxwell Karmazyn – strings (track 15)
- Nicholas Kennerly – strings (track 15)

Production

- Jhené Aiko – executive production, production (tracks 15 and 16), additional production (tracks 15 and 16)
- Taz – executive production
- Fisticuffs – co-executive production, production (tracks 2–3, 7, 10, 12, 21), co-production (tracks 10, 21, and 24)
- Amaire Johnson – co-executive production, production (tracks 4–5, 10–11, 13–16), additional production (tracks 11, 13, and 14)
- Dot da Genius – production (tracks 1, 8, 12, 14, 21, 23, and 24), co-production (track 12)
- Noel Cadastre – production (track 6)
- Julian-Quan Viet Le – production (track 7)
- John Mayer – production (track 9)
- Benny Blanco – production (track 11)
- Cashmere Cat – production (track 11)
- Frank Dukes – production (track 11)
- Mike Zombie – production (track 13)
- Trakgirl – production (track 13)
- No I.D. – production (track 17)
- Julian-Quan Viet Le – production (track 18)
- KeY Wane – production (track 19)
- Mali Music – production (tracks 20 and 22)
- Mike Moore – additional production (track 1)
- Woodro Skillson – additional production (track 23)

Technical

- John Ralph Orlow – drum programming (track 5)
- Amaire Johnson – keyboards (track 6), additional keyboards (tracks 3, 19, and 20)
- Julian-Quan Viet Le – additional keyboards (tracks 3 and 21)
- Brian Warfield – additional keyboards (track 15), recording engineering (track 17)
- Gregg Rominiecki – mixing (tracks 1, 5, 7, 20–22)
- Jaycen Joshua – mixing (tracks 2–19, and 23)
- Dave Nakaji – mixing assistance (tracks 2–19, 23, and 24)
- Iván Jiménez – mixing assistance (tracks 2–19, 23, and 24)
- Fisticuffs – recording engineering (tracks 1–3, 6–10, 13–14, 18, 21–24), engineering (tracks 11, 15–17, and 20)
- Jim Caruana – recording engineering (tracks 1–2, 4, 6–17, 19–22)
- Christian Plata – recording engineering (tracks 1–3, 6–10, 12–14, 18, 21–24), additional mixing (track 8)
- Maximilian Jaeger – recording engineering (tracks 14, 18, and 22)
- Casey Cuayo – recording engineering assistance (tracks 1–2, 4–8, 10–17, 19–23)
- Jhené Aiko – recording arrangement (tracks 1–2, 4–8, 11–22)
- Big Sean – recording arrangement (track 4)
- Swae Lee – recording arrangement (track 7)
- Mali Music – recording arrangement (tracks 20 and 22)
- 6lack – recording arrangement (track 23)
- Chris Brown – recording arrangement (track 24)
- Dave Kutch – mastering (all tracks)

Management

- Jhené Aiko – A&R, styling
- TOCK – art direction, photography
- Veronica Ettman – package design
- Joe Spix – package design
- Chris Le – additional design
- Paul Lane – package production

Miscellaneous

- Olapido Omishore – author (tracks 1, 14, 21–24)
- Brian Warfield – author (tracks 2–3, 7, 9–10, 21, and 24)
- Jhené Aiko – author (tracks 2–7, 9–10, 14, 16–21, 23, and 24)
- Maclean Robinson – author (tracks 2–3, 7, 9–10, 21–22, and 24)
- Amaire Johnson – author (tracks 4–5, 10, 14, and 16)
- Big Sean – author (tracks 4 and 5)
- Swae Lee – author (track 7)
- Earnest Wilson – author (track 17)
- Frank Dukes – author (track 17)
- Julian-Quan Viet Le – author (track 18)
- KeY Wane – author (track 19)
- Mali Music – author (tracks 20 and 22)
- Chris Brown – author (track 24)

Notes

- "Clear My Mind" and "Hello Ego" from the Target exclusive version are listed as tracks 23 and 24, respectively

== Charts ==
=== Weekly charts ===
Chart (2017)	Peak position
Belgian Albums (Ultratop Flanders)	171
Canadian Albums (Billboard)	36
Dutch Albums (Album Top 100)	81
New Zealand Heatseeker Albums (RMNZ)	2
UK Albums (Official Charts)	56
US Billboard 200	5
US Top R&B/Hip-Hop Albums (Billboard)	4

=== Year-end charts ===
Chart (2017)	Position
US Top R&B/Hip-Hop Albums (Billboard)	83
Chart (2018)	Position
US Billboard 200	126
US Top R&B/Hip-Hop Albums (Billboard)	100

== Certifications ==
Region	Certification	Certified units/sales
New Zealand (RMNZ)	Platinum	15,000^{‡}
United States (RIAA)	Platinum	1,000,000^{‡}
^{‡} Sales+streaming figures based on certification alone.
