= Single Again (Big Sean song) =

2019 song by Big Sean

Single by Big Sean

from the album Detroit 2
- Released: July 26, 2019
- Genre: Hip hop; R&B
- Length: 3:34
- Label: GOOD; Def Jam
- Songwriters: Sean Anderson; David Biral; Denzel Baptiste; Stephen Feigenbaum; Tyrone Griffin; Mike Flowers; Dee Lilly; Cameron Osteen; Amaire Johnson
- Producers: Johan Lenox; Johnson; Take a Daytrip; Cam O'bi; Lilly; Anderson

Big Sean singles chronology
| "Overtime" (2019) | "Single Again" (2019) | "Bezerk" (2019) |

Music video
- "Single Again" on YouTube
- "Single Again (Extended Version)" on YouTube

"Single Again" is a single by American rapper Big Sean. It was released on July 26, 2019 by GOOD Music and Def Jam Recordings. The song was features background vocals from American singers Jhené Aiko and Ty Dolla Sign, as well as production from Johan Lenox, Amaire Johnson, Take a Daytrip, Cam O'bi, Dee Lilly, and Big Sean himself. The song samples "I Wish" by Carl Thomas and interpolates Sean's song "I Don't Fuck with You".

== Background and composition ==
For about three years, Big Sean and Jhené Aiko dated one another on-and-off, but in March 2019, Aiko confirmed that they broke up. "Single Again" marks the first collaboration between them ever since.

Lyrically, Big Sean mulls over the end of his relationship with Aiko and unnecessity of entirely blaming the shortcomings on the other person. He also recognizes the importance of taking time for himself to focus on his own needs, as well as the impact on his mental health resulting from the breakup. Prior to releasing the song, Sean tweeted lyrics of the song, as well as a message that details the song's meaning and the importance of finding solace in a relationship with himself:

"I never knew that I didn't know how to be alone in life. I always would find so much joy n happiness in a relationship or being with friends, but I didn't know how important it was to be in a relationship with yourself."

== Music video ==
A music video was released on July 29, 2019. Directed by Lawrence Lamont with cinematography by Jon Chema, the video stars Ryan Destiny, Keith Powers and Haha Davis, and follows a recently separated couple. Big Sean also raps in the middle of a street and inside a car surrounded by fans, and finds himself being put on trial and going to prison for infidelity. A shorter music video was released on August 26, 2019.

== Charts ==
| Chart (2019) | Peak position |
|---|---|
| New Zealand Hot Singles (RMNZ) | 25 |
| US Billboard Hot 100 | 64 |
| US Hot R&B/Hip-Hop Songs (Billboard) | 25 |

== Certifications ==
| Region | Certification | Certified units/sales |
|---|---|---|
| United States (RIAA) | Gold | 500,000^{‡} |
^{‡} Sales+streaming figures based on certification alone.
