= While We're Young (Jhené Aiko song) =

2017 song by Jhené Aiko

Single by Jhené Aiko

from the album Trip
- Released: June 9, 2017
- Genre: R&B
- Length: 3:59
- Label: Def Jam
- Songwriter(s): Brian Keith Warfield; Jhené Chilombo; Mac Robinson; Michael Volpe
- Producer(s): Fisticuffs

Jhené Aiko singles chronology
"While We're Young" (2017)	"Hello Ego" (2017)

Music video
- "While We're Young (Official music video)" on YouTube

Official audio
- "While We're Young" on YouTube

"While We're Young" is a lead single by American singer Jhené Aiko taken from her second studio album, Trip (2017). It was released on June 9, 2017, through Def Jam Recordings, produced by frequent collaborator The Fisticuffs, and was certified 3× Platinum by the Recording Industry Association of America (RIAA).

== Music video ==
A music video to "While We're Young" were published on Aiko's YouTube channel hours after the single was released. Directed by Jay Ahn, it reflects upon the motion picture, 50 First Dates (2004) starring Adam Sandler. Aiko portrays Lucy Whitmore, a woman with short-term memory loss.

== Charts ==
Chart performance for "While We're Young"
Chart (2017)	Peak position
US Bubbling Under Hot 100 (Billboard)	5
US Hot R&B/Hip-Hop Songs (Billboard)	46

== Certifications ==
Region	Certification	Certified units/sales
New Zealand (RMNZ)	Platinum	30,000^{‡}
United Kingdom (BPI)	Silver	200,000^{‡}
United States (RIAA)	3× Platinum	3,000,000^{‡}
^{‡} Sales+streaming figures based on certification alone.
