= Eternal Sunshine of the Spotless Mind =

2004 film by Michel Gondry

- Theatrical release poster
- Directed by: Michel Gondry
- Screenplay by: Charlie Kaufman
- Story by: Charlie Kaufman; Michel Gondry; Pierre Bismuth
- Produced by: Steve Golin; Anthony Bregman
- Starring: Jim Carrey; Kate Winslet; Kirsten Dunst; Mark Ruffalo; Elijah Wood; Tom Wilkinson
- Cinematography: Ellen Kuras
- Edited by: Valdís Óskarsdóttir
- Music by: Jon Brion
- Production companies: Anonymous Content; This is that
- Distributed by: Focus Features
- Release dates: March 9, 2004 (Los Angeles); March 19, 2004 (United States)
- Running time: 108 minutes
- Country: United States
- Language: English
- Budget: $20 million
- Box office: $72.9 million

Eternal Sunshine of the Spotless Mind is a 2004 American science fiction romantic drama film directed by Michel Gondry and written by Charlie Kaufman from a story by Gondry, Kaufman, and Pierre Bismuth. It stars Jim Carrey and Kate Winslet as a couple who undergo memory erasure after they break up. Kirsten Dunst, Mark Ruffalo, Elijah Wood and Tom Wilkinson appear in supporting roles. The title of the film is a quotation from the 1717 poem Eloisa to Abelard by Alexander Pope. It uses elements of psychological drama and science fiction and a nonlinear narrative to explore the nature of memory and love.

Eternal Sunshine of the Spotless Mind premiered in Los Angeles on March 9, 2004, and was released in theaters in the United States by Focus Features on March 19, to widespread acclaim from critics, who praised the script and direction. The film was a box office success, grossing $72.9 million on a $20 million budget, and was named by the American Film Institute one of the Top 10 Films of 2004. At the 77th Academy Awards, Bismuth, Gondry and Kaufman won Best Original Screenplay, and Winslet received a nomination for Best Actress.

The film has been named by several publications as one of the greatest of the 21st century and gained a cult following. It inspired music projects such as Jay Electronica's 2007 piece "Eternal Sunshine (The Pledge)", Jhené Aiko's 2014 track "Spotless Mind" and Ariana Grande's 2024 album Eternal Sunshine.

== Plot ==
Joel Barish discovers that his estranged ex-girlfriend, Clementine Kruczynski, has undergone a procedure to have her memories of him erased by the suburban Long Island firm Lacuna. Heartbroken, he decides to undergo the same procedure. In preparation, he records a tape recounting his memories of their volatile relationship.

The Lacuna employees work on Joel's brain as he sleeps in his apartment so that he will wake up with no memory of the procedure. One employee, Patrick, leaves to see Clementine; since her procedure, he has been using Clementine's memories of Joel as a guide to seduce her. While the procedure runs on Joel's brain, the technician (Stan) and the secretary (Mary) smoke cannabis, party, and have sex.

Joel re-experiences his memories of Clementine in reverse chronological order as they are erased, starting with their last fight. As he reaches earlier, happier memories, he realizes that he does not want to forget her. His mental projection of Clementine suggests that he hides her in memories that do not involve her. This halts the procedure, but Stan calls his boss, Howard, who arrives and restarts it. Joel comes to his last remaining memory of Clementine: the day they first met, on a beach in Montauk. As the memory crumbles around them, Clementine tells Joel to meet her in Montauk.

In Joel's apartment, Mary tries to impress Howard through their mutual interest in poetry by reciting a verse from Eloisa to Abelard. While Stan is outside, she tells Howard she is in love with him and they kiss. Howard's wife arrives and sees them through the window. Enraged, she tells Howard to tell Mary the truth: Mary and Howard had previously had an affair, and Mary had her memories of it erased. Disgusted, Mary steals the Lacuna records and mails them to the patients, including Joel and Clementine.

Joel wakes up on Valentine's Day with his memories of Clementine erased. He impulsively takes the Long Island Rail Road to Montauk and calls in sick to work. He accidentally meets Clementine on the train ride home; they are drawn to one another, and go on a date to the frozen Charles River in Boston. Joel drives Clementine home and Patrick sees the two of them, realizing they have found each other again. Joel and Clementine receive their Lacuna records from Mary and listen to their tapes together. They are shocked by the bitter memories they had of each other and almost separate for good, but finally agree to try again.

== Cast ==
- Jim Carrey as Joel Barish
- Kate Winslet as Clementine Kruczynski
- Kirsten Dunst as Mary Svevo
- Mark Ruffalo as Stan Fink
- Tom Wilkinson as Dr. Howard Mierzwiak
- Elijah Wood as Patrick Wertz
- Jane Adams as Carrie Eakin
- David Cross as Rob Eakin
- Thomas Jay Ryan as Frank
- Deirdre O'Connell as Hollis Mierzwiak
- Debbon Ayer as Mrs. Barish
- Ellen Pompeo as Naomi (deleted scene)

=== Characters and casting ===
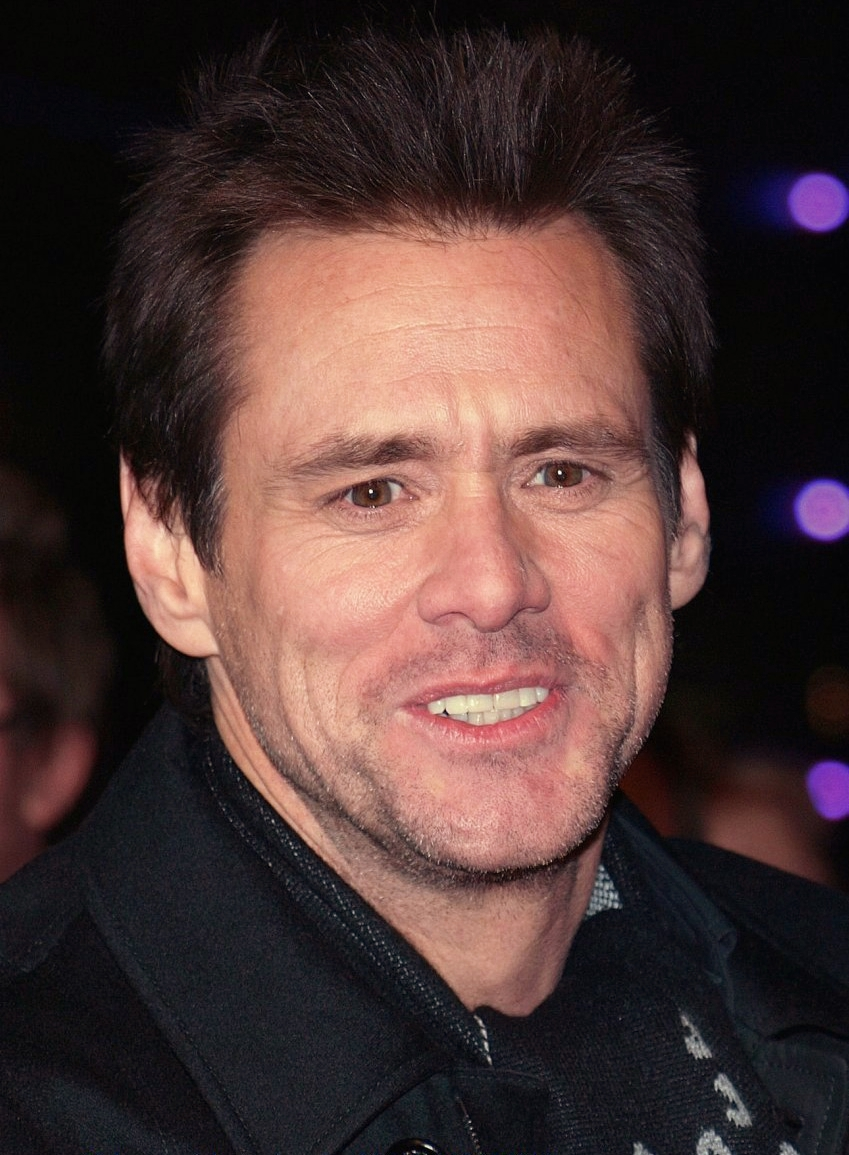
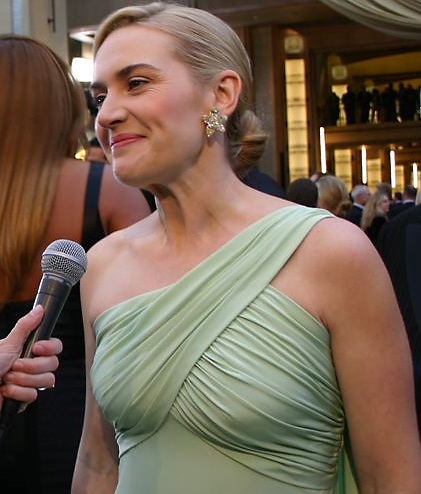
Jim Carrey (top) in 2008, and Kate Winslet in 2007

Charlie Kaufman depicted Joel with some of his own personality traits. Producers cast Carrey against type for his role as Joel, selecting him for his everyday appearance, as well as his comedic ability. According to Gondry, this was because "It's hard to be funny. It's far easier to take someone really funny and bring them down than do the opposite." To induce Carrey, an actor who typically portrayed high-energy roles, to portray a restrained character, Gondry would not allow him to improvise, a restriction he did not place on the other cast members (Carrey objected). Gondry also put Carrey off balance by giving misleading orders or by rolling the camera at the wrong time. Gondry believed this would make Carrey forget what he should do to be Joel, allowing him to go in character. In the 2017 Netflix documentary Jim & Andy, Carrey mentions a conversation with Gondry one year before shooting began for Eternal Sunshine of the Spotless Mind, shortly after Carrey had a breakup with an unspecified woman. Gondry saw that Carrey's emotional state at the time was "so beautiful, so broken" that he asked him to stay that way for one year to fit the character. In the documentary, Carrey commented, "That's how fucked up this business is." Nicolas Cage was Gondry's original choice to play Joel, but Cage was unavailable as he was in high demand from independent directors after his performance in Leaving Las Vegas.

Producers cast Winslet against type for her part as Clementine, as Winslet had previously featured heavily in period pieces. She received the role after she was the only actress to offer criticism on the script instead of pandering to the writers. After another actress won an Oscar, the studio attempted to make Gondry use her instead of Winslet for the role of Clementine, but Gondry threatened to walk from the project if that occurred. During filming, Gondry took Winslet to a separate room to coach her, and she wore wigs instead of dyeing her hair. Some commentators note how Clementine's character criticizes the Manic Pixie Dream Girl stock character several years before film critic Nathan Rabin coined the phrase. Most commentators discuss one particular example to demonstrate this criticism, wherein Clementine warns Joel she is flawed: "Too many guys think I'm a concept, or I complete them, or I'm gonna make them alive. But I'm just a fucked-up girl who's looking for my own peace of mind. Don't assign me yours." With her impulsiveness, emotional intensity (extreme mood changes), alcohol consumption, turbulent relationships, reckless behavior, and hasty idealization or devaluation of Joel, Clementine seems to exhibit traits of borderline personality disorder, although it is not clear whether Kaufman wrote her character with this specific diagnosis in mind. Gondry had earlier thought of casting Björk for the role of Clementine. She feared she would be emotionally affected and rejected the invitation after reading the script. Winona Ryder also met with Gondry for the role.

In the script, Mary and Howard's relationship resulted in an unplanned pregnancy, leading to Howard pressuring Mary into an abortion, which Howard also erased from her memory. Ruffalo received the role of Stan after providing an "unexpected take on the role" to Gondry when he suggested Stan be a fan of the Clash and resemble Joe Strummer. Wilkinson reportedly did not enjoy the shooting of the film and clashed with Gondry. Seth Rogen had auditioned for the role of Patrick Wertz.

== Production ==
=== Development ===
The concept of Eternal Sunshine of the Spotless Mind came from conversations between director Michel Gondry and co-writer Pierre Bismuth in 1998. The pair had met and become friends in the early 1980s during Gondry's drumming career in the French pop group Oui Oui. Bismuth had conceived of the idea of erasing certain people from people's minds in response to a friend complaining about her boyfriend; when he asked her if she would erase that boyfriend from her memory, she said yes. Bismuth originally planned to conduct an art experiment involving sending cards to people saying someone they knew had erased the card's recipient from their memory. When he mentioned this to Gondry, they developed it into a story based on the situations that would arise if it were scientifically possible. Bismuth never carried out his experiment.

Gondry approached writer Charlie Kaufman with this concept, and they developed it into a short pitch. While the writers did not believe the concept was marketable, a small bidding war began over the idea. Steve Golin of Propaganda Films purchased it on June 12, 1998, for a low seven-figure sum. Kaufman, who was responsible for writing the screenplay, did not begin immediately, instead opting to suspend writing while he was working on Adaptation, Confessions of a Dangerous Mind, and Human Nature, the last of which Gondry directed as his directorial debut.

During this time, filmmaker Christopher Nolan released Memento (2000), which similarly deals with memory. Due to the similarities, Kaufman became worried and tried to pull out of the project, but Golin made him complete it. During writing, the pitch's ownership changed several times resulting in Kaufman not having to deal with the studios until the end of the scriptwriting process. The final script made the studios nervous.

How happy is the blameless vestal's lot!
The world forgetting, by the world forgot:
Eternal sunshine of the spotless mind!
Each prayer accepted, and each wish resigned;

— Alexander Pope, Eloisa to Abelard, lines 207–210

Kaufman did not want to make the film a thriller and wanted to downplay the science fiction aspects of memory erasure, focusing on the relationship. He had an "enormous struggle" while writing the script, particularly encountering two problems: showing "the memories, Joel's reactions to the memories, and Joel interacting with Clementine outside of the memories in the memories," and the fact that characters could refer in later scenes to already erased memories.

Kaufman resolved the first problem by making Joel lucid and able to comment on his memories and solved the second by making the memories degrade instead of immediately erasing, with complete erasure occurring at awakening. Kaufman's original name for the screenplay was 18 words long, as he had wanted a title that "you couldn't possibly fit on a marquee." He eventually decided on Eternal Sunshine of the Spotless Mind, a title originating from the 1717 poem Eloisa to Abelard by Alexander Pope. Alain Resnais's Je t'aime, je t'aime (1968) has been suggested as an influence on the film.

=== Filming and post-production ===
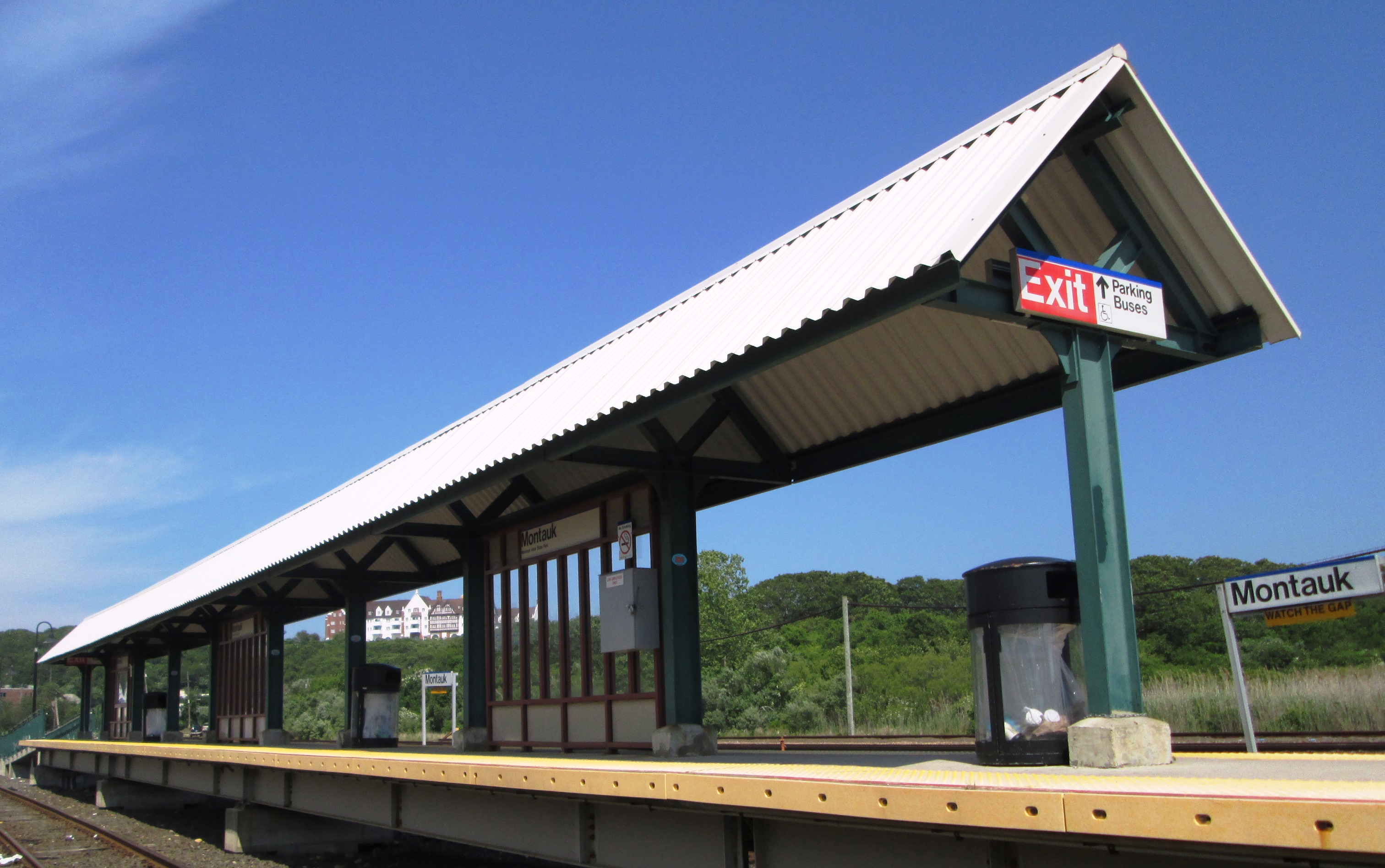
Montauk station, where Joel and Clementine meet each other again after the erasing of their memories

The shooting of Eternal Sunshine of the Spotless Mind began in mid-January 2003 after six weeks of preparation, lasting for three months on a budget of $20 million mostly in and around New York City. The film was shot on Fuji Reala 500D. The production crew recreated some key scenes, such as Joel's Rockville Centre apartment and the 1950s-style kitchen, in a New Jersey former U.S. Navy base. The shoot was difficult, sometimes shooting for 17 hours per day in harsh environments.

The shoot was challenging for cinematographer Ellen Kuras, due to the difficulty of filming Gondry's vision, which aimed to "blend location-shoot authenticity with unpredictable flashes of whimsy". Gondry wanted available light used exclusively for the shoot. Kuras disagreed and worked around this idea by lighting the room instead of the actors and by hiding light bulbs around the set to increase light levels. Another issue the cinematographers encountered was that due to the frequent improvisation, the lack of marks and the few rehearsals completed, the cinematographers often did not know where the actors would be. Two handheld cameras filmed near 360-degree footage at all times, shooting 36,000 feet of film a day to deal with this. Gondry called back to the work of French New Wave director Jean-Luc Godard by filming using wheelchairs as well as using sled and chariot dollies instead of traditional dollies. When using wheelchairs, the shot was not consistently smooth; however, as Kuras liked the aesthetic of the low-angle, wobbly movement, the final film contains the footage.

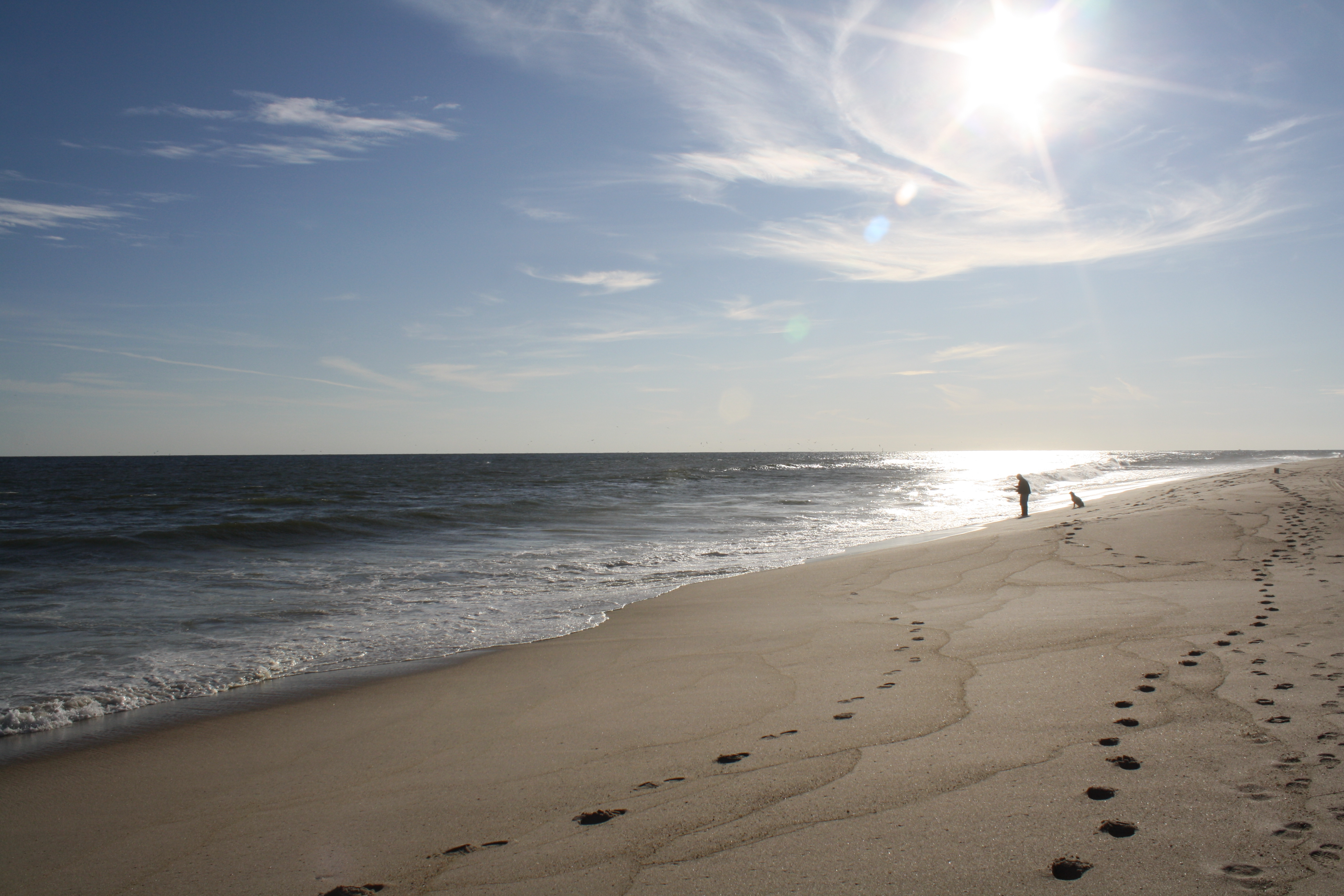
A beach in East Hampton, near where the film's beach scenes were filmed

The film used minimal CGI, with many effects accomplished in-camera through forced perspectives, hidden space, spotlighting, unsynchronized sound, split focus and continuity editing. A notable example is the ocean washing away the house in Montauk; the production team accomplished this by building the corner of a house on the beach and allowing the tide to rise. Executing this effect was difficult, as the special team hired to place the set in the water refused due to perceived dangers. In response, Gondry fired the team and had the production team, including the actors and producers, place the set in the water. In retaliation for Gondry's actions, the chief of the union reprimanded Gondry in front of the crew.

Kaufman rewrote some of the script during production; thus, several differences exist between the production script and the final film. A fundamental difference is that in the production script, with the erasure of each memory, Clementine's behavior is increasingly robotic. In the final film, Winslet plays Clementine straight, and degradation of settings and the intrusion of settings upon each other establish memory degradation visually. Another script component that did not make it into the final film was the appearance of Naomi, Joel's girlfriend, played by Ellen Pompeo. Against Kaufman's insistence on Naomi's inclusion, the production team cut her already filmed scenes. Tracy Morgan was also cut from the film. In one version of the script, Kaufman began the story 50 years in the future. An old woman who turns out to be Mary tries to drop off a bulky manuscript at a publishing house, but the publisher declines her offer. We later learn that the manuscript contains all of the memories that Lacuna had erased from its patients. This version of the film ends with an elderly Clementine once again erasing Joel.

Valdís Óskarsdóttir edited the film, and she reportedly clashed with Gondry during editing. Kaufman was also very involved in the editing of the film, which was a longer process as there was little time constraint. There were a few test screenings of the film, which elicited positive reactions.

== Music ==
The soundtrack for Eternal Sunshine of the Spotless Mind was composed by Jon Brion, also featuring songs from artists including the Polyphonic Spree, the Willowz and Don Nelson. Hollywood Records released the soundtrack in March 2004. A cover version of the Korgis' "Everybody's Got to Learn Sometime" with instrumentation by Brion and vocals by Beck operates as the soundtrack's centerpiece, setting the film's tone in the opening credits, and closing the film.

Eternal Sunshine of the Spotless Mind's soundtrack received generally positive reviews. AllMusic described Brion's score as "intimate" and "evocative of love and memories". Other positive reviews noted the ambient nature of the music and lauded Beck's cover of "Everybody's Got to Learn Sometime". The soundtrack's detractors criticized the album's lack of identity and its depressive atmosphere. Even among the detractors, the score's ability to mesh with the plot was lauded, an appraisal common to many reviews.

== Analysis ==
Author Carol Vernallis, writing in Screen, argued that Gondry's experience in directing music videos contributed to the film's mise-en-scène and sound design. Vernallis describes some threads of the visual, aural, and musical motifs throughout the film, and how some motifs can work in counterpoint.

Philosopher Christopher Grau, in The Journal of Aesthetics and Art Criticism, discussed how he perceived the film to have its own defined philosophy, beyond addressing ideas of a philosophical nature.

Eternal Sunshine of the Spotless Mind has been aligned with a greater inspection, distinctly related to the 21st century, of memory, longing and nostalgia in science fiction films like Code 46 and 2046. The film showcases memory as fragmented and unreliable, evident by its non-linear structure.

== Release ==
=== Marketing ===
For promotion, a website for the fictional company Lacuna was made in 2003, which included a spoof advertisement. An official trailer for the film was released in 2004. The trailer was edited in a more comedic style than the movie itself, which may have misled viewers about the tone of the film.

=== Box office ===
Produced on a budget of $20 million, Eternal Sunshine of the Spotless Mind opened on March 19, 2004, in the United States, earning $8.2 million in its opening weekend from 1,353 theaters. Box Office Mojo lists $72.87 million worldwide for the film’s original release. Including subsequent re-releases, its current “All Releases” total is $72.94 million worldwide. Kaufman later said that the film’s rights holders continued to report it as “in the red”, which he attributed to Hollywood accounting.

Although screenwriter Kaufman was told the film had not generated a profit, it remains his most commercially successful work, grossing more than twice as much as Adaptation (2002) and over three times as much as Being John Malkovich (1999).

=== Home media ===
Universal Home Entertainment release Formats and Dates
Format	Location	Release date
VHS	U.S.	September 28, 2004
DVD	U.S.	September 28, 2004
HD DVD	U.S.	April 24, 2007
Blu-ray	U.S.	January 25, 2011

Eternal Sunshine of the Spotless Mind was released on VHS and DVD by Universal Studios Home Video on September 28, 2004, selling a combined total of over 600,000 units on the first day. Among the add-ons included were deleted scenes. It debuted at number 11 on the VHS rental chart, as well as number three on the DVD sales chart.

A two-disc Collector's Edition was later released on January 4, 2005. It was later released on HD DVD on April 24, 2007, and on Blu-ray on January 25, 2011. On July 26, 2022, Kino Lorber Studio Classics released Eternal Sunshine of the Spotless Mind on 4K Ultra HD Blu-Ray. This release included a new color grading supervised by cinematographer Ellen Kuras.

== Reception ==
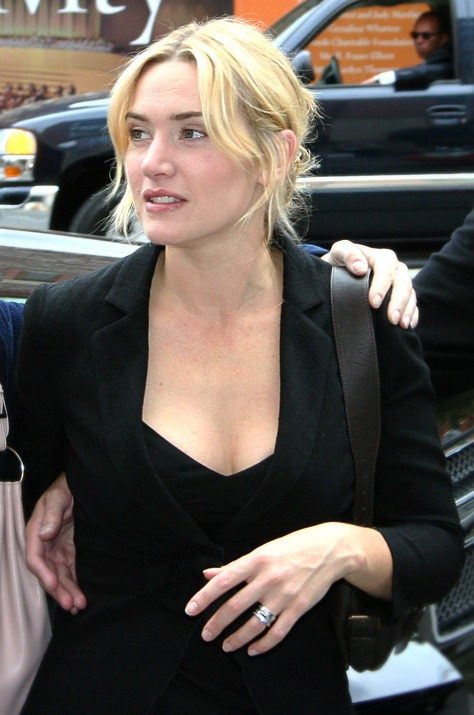
Kate Winslet's performance garnered widespread critical acclaim, earning her a nomination for the Academy Award for Best Actress.

On Rotten Tomatoes, Eternal Sunshine of the Spotless Mind has an approval rating of 93% based on 256 reviews, with an average score of 8.8/10. The site's critical consensus reads, "Propelled by Charlie Kaufman's smart, imaginative script and Michel Gondry's equally daring directorial touch, Eternal Sunshine is a twisty yet heartfelt look at relationships and heartache." On Metacritic, the film has a score of 89 out of 100, based on 41 reviews. Audiences polled by CinemaScore gave the film an average grade of "B−" on an A+ to F scale.

Roger Ebert wrote: "Despite jumping through the deliberately disorienting hoops of its story, Eternal Sunshine has an emotional center, and that's what makes it work. Although Joel and Clementine ping-pong through various stages of romance and reality, what remains constant is the human need for love and companionship, and the human compulsion to keep seeking it, despite all odds." In 2010, he added it to his "Great Movies" canon, writing "The wisdom in Eternal Sunshine is how it illuminates the way memory interacts with love. We more readily recall pleasure than pain. From the hospital I remember laughing nurses and not sleepless nights. A drunk remembers the good times better than the hangovers. A failed political candidate remembers the applause. An unsuccessful romantic lover remembers the times when it worked." A. O. Scott praised it as "cerebral, formally and conceptually complicated, dense with literary allusions and as unabashedly romantic as any movie you'll ever see". Time Out concluded: "the formidable Gondry/Kaufman/Carrey/Winslet axis works marvel after marvel in expressing the bewildering beauty and existential horror of being trapped inside one's own addled mind, and in allegorising the self-preserving amnesia of a broken but hopeful heart".

Winslet and Carrey received widespread praise for their performances. Winslet received multiple award nominations, including an Academy Award nomination for Best Actress, a BAFTA nomination for Best Actress in a Leading Role and a Golden Globe Award nomination. Premiere placed her performance 81st in their 2008 list of the 100 Greatest Performances of All Time. Claudia Puig wrote: "Winslet is wonderful as a free spirit whose hair color changes along with her moods. She hasn't had such a meaty role in a while, and she plays it just right". Ann Hornaday, in The Washington Post, said "Even when forced to wear costumes and wigs that make her look like Pippi Longstocking after an acid-fueled trip to the thrift market, Winslet maintains a reassuring equilibrium. It takes an actor of her steadiness to play someone this unhinged."

Carrey also received multiple award nominations, including a BAFTA nomination for Best Actor in a Leading Role and a Golden Globe nomination. Many reviewers noted his casting against type. Jason Killingsworth wrote: "Carrey nails the part, winning audience sympathy from the opening moments of the film". Moira MacDonald in The Seattle Times stated "[Jim Carrey is] not bad at all — in fact, it's the most honest, vulnerable work he's ever done", while David Edelstein of Slate said "It's rarely a compliment when I refer to an actor as "straitjacketed", but the straitjacketing of Jim Carrey is fiercely poignant. You see all that manic comic energy imprisoned in this ordinary man, with the anarchism peeking out and trying to find a way to express itself." The supporting cast also received acclaim, with several reviewers, including Hornaday and Rick Groen of The Globe and Mail singling out Ruffalo's performance for praise.

Critics praised Kaufman, and he won numerous awards, including an Academy Award and a BAFTA for Best Original Screenplay. In Slate, David Edelstein claimed Kaufman had "move[d] the boundary posts of romantic comedy," and Moira MacDonald of The Seattle Times called Kaufman "one of the few creative screenwriters working today." John Powers of the LA Weekly said Eternal Sunshine lacked "genuine human passion" behind its "postmodernism tricks", and Andrew Sarris of The Observer criticized the "nonexistent character development".

Gondry received praise, with Hornaday writing "the results [of Gondry using primarily in-camera effects], in their intricate detail and execution" as "nothing short of brilliant". The Seattle Times in their review stated "Gondry ... makes it all a melancholy fun house, with camera work and visual tricks that rival the screenplay in invention". Cinematographer Ellen Kuras received praise for her work on the film; in an overall negative review, Stephanie Zacharek of Salon praised Kuras for giving "the movie a look of dreamy urgency that's perfect for the story".

== Accolades ==
Award	Award category	Recipients	Result	Ref.
Academy Awards	Best Actress	Kate Winslet	Nominated	
Academy Awards	Best Original Screenplay	Pierre Bismuth, Michel Gondry and Charlie Kaufman	Won	
British Academy Film Awards	Best Film	Steve Golin and Anthony Bregman	Nominated	
British Academy Film Awards	Best Director	Michel Gondry	Nominated	
British Academy Film Awards	Best Original Screenplay	Charlie Kaufman	Won	
British Academy Film Awards	Best Actor in a Leading Role	Jim Carrey	Nominated	
British Academy Film Awards	Best Actress in a Leading Role	Kate Winslet	Nominated	
British Academy Film Awards	Best Editing	Valdís Óskarsdóttir	Won	
Golden Globe Awards	Best Motion Picture – Musical or Comedy	Steve Golin and Anthony Bregman	Nominated	
Golden Globe Awards	Best Screenplay	Charlie Kaufman	Nominated	
Golden Globe Awards	Best Actor – Motion Picture Musical or Comedy	Jim Carrey	Nominated	
Golden Globe Awards	Best Actress – Motion Picture Comedy or Musical	Kate Winslet	Nominated	
Hugo Awards	Best Dramatic Presentation	Pierre Bismuth, Michel Gondry and Charlie Kaufman	Nominated	
National Board of Review	Best Original Screenplay	Charlie Kaufman	Won	
Writers Guild of America	Best Original Screenplay	Pierre Bismuth, Michel Gondry and Charlie Kaufman	Won	

== Legacy ==
Eternal Sunshine has continued to receive acclaim in the decades after its release. In 2025, The New York Times listed it as the 7th best movie of the 21st century: "Sometimes a movie comes along that is so wildly inventive and wonderfully strange, you wonder if you dreamed it...The movie — equal parts playful and gutting — emphasizes how strongly such memories, even terrible ones, shape us." Ross Douthat included it on his list, calling it "The most complete and accessible and moving Charlie Kaufman movie". The A. V. Club placed it first on its list of the best films of the 2000s, writing: "Though Kaufman is hardly a purely cerebral writer, his philosophical inquiries find an added emotional weight under Gondry's direction. Portraying the fading and flaring of love in gargantuan bookstores and on railway lines, Gondry captures a moment that's quintessentially of the 21st century, and yet timeless ... It's the rare film that shows us who we are now and who we're likely, for better or worse, forever to be."

=== Music ===
The film has had a lasting influence on musicians across genres and countries. American singer-songwriter Halsey sampled dialogue from the film in her song "Ashley", the opening track of her 2020 album Manic, and titled the following track, "Clementine", after Kate Winslet's character, drawing lyrical inspiration from her as well. Similarly, American post-hardcore band Circa Survive referenced the film both directly and indirectly in their lyrics on their 2005 debut album Juturna, which primarily explores lead singer Anthony Green's struggles with addiction. The band Stars based the music video for their song "Your Ex-Lover Is Dead" on the frozen lake scene from the film.

The film's score, composed by Jon Brion, has also inspired many artists. Rapper Kanye West heard the score and chose to have Brion work on producing the hit single "Gold Digger". American rapper and producer Jay Electronica sampled five tracks from Brion's score for his 2007 debut mixtape Act 1: Eternal Sunshine (The Pledge), while American rapper and record producer Mac Miller incorporated one of the tracks into his 2013 song "The Quest."

American singer-songwriter Jhené Aiko cited the film as an inspiration for two songs, "Eternal Sunshine" and "Spotless Mind", featured on her 2014 debut album Souled Out. Emo rap artist Robert Lund (also known mononymously as Lund) included two portions of dialogue from the film in his 2017 single "By My Side". In South Korea, singer-songwriter Taeyeon drew from the film's themes for the music video of her 2020 EP title track, "What Do I Call You", and rapper B.I credited the movie as the inspiration behind his 2022 song "Tangerine," from Love or Loved Part.1.

American singer-songwriter Ariana Grande titled her seventh studio album, Eternal Sunshine (2024), after the film. Her music videos for the singles "Yes, And?" and "We Can't Be Friends (Wait for Your Love)", along with the rest of the album and the tie-in short film Brighter Days Ahead (2025), include numerous references to the film.

=== Video games ===
Kan Gao, founder of Freebird Games, said his video game To the Moon, which is about two doctors traversing the memory of an old man to fulfill his last wish, was inspired by the film.

=== Media recognition ===
Year	Presenter	Title	Rank	Ref.
2005	Writers Guild of America	101 Greatest Screenplays	24	
2008	Empire	The 500 Greatest Movies of All Time	73	
2009	Time Out New York	The TONY Top 50 Movies of the Decade	3	
2009	Slant Magazine	The 100 Best Films of the Aughts	86	
2009	Paste	The 50 Best Movies of the Decade (2000–2009)	5	
2009	The A.V. Club	The Best Films of the '00s	1	
2009	Metacritic	Film Critics Pick the Best Movies of the Decade	2	
2016	BBC	The 21st Century's 100 Greatest Films	6	
2018	Empire	The 100 Greatest Movies	41	
2018	They Shoot Pictures Don't They	The 21st Century's Most Acclaimed Films	13	
2021	Writers Guild of America	101 Greatest Screenplays of the 21st Century (so far)	2	
2022	Sight and Sound	Directors' 100 Greatest Films of All Time	99	
2025	The New York Times	100 Best Movies of the 21st Century	7	
2025	The New York Times	100 Best Movies of the 21st Century (Readers' Choice)	9	
2025	Rolling Stone	100 Best Movies of the 21st Century	17	

== See also ==
- "Eternal Moonshine of the Simpson Mind"
- Lucid dream
- List of films considered the best
