= Impostor Factory =

- Video game cover art
- Developer: Freebird Games
- Publisher: Freebird Games
- Director: Kan Gao
- Writer: Kan Gao
- Engine: RPG Maker
- Platforms: Linux; macOS; Windows
- Release: September 30, 2021
- Genres: Adventure, role-playing, thriller
- Mode: Single-player

Impostor Factory is a 2021 adventure video game developed and published by Freebird Games. Like A Bird Story, the game was a follow-up and prequel of To the Moon and Finding Paradise. The story revolves around the new protagonist Quincy Reynard, who ends up in a murder case inside a mansion but suddenly finds himself experiencing double murders and mysterious time loops. The game released on September 30, 2021, for Linux, macOS, and Windows to positive reviews.

== Gameplay ==
Impostor Factory's gameplay is similar to that of the first game in the series, To the Moon, which was built on the RPG Maker XP engine. Like the previous game, it functions like a typical RPG, but lacks many RPG elements. However, unlike its predecessors, Impostor Factory does feature an inventory and party system, but these features are only used for jokes, and ultimately have no impact on the gameplay. Players navigate Quincy through story events as he tries to understand the events unraveling around him.

== Plot ==
On a rainy afternoon, Quincy Reynard arrives at what appears to be a decrepit mansion for a party. The massive estate is owned by Dr. Yu and Dr. Haynes, who run the illustrious Yu-Haynes Foundation in an underground lab hidden deep beneath the mansion. Quincy gets acquainted with the other party guests, including Lynri, a mysterious young woman with the ability to seemingly be in two places at once. As Quincy navigates the party, he finds that the sink in the bathroom can apparently rewind time for him. Eventually, Quincy accidentally stumbles upon the corpses of a recently murdered Dr. Yu and Dr. Haynes. Accused of being the culprit for his strange behavior, Quincy runs away to rewind time in the bathroom, but is eventually informed by Lynri that the murders are not real, the world he inhabits is nothing but a simulation, and that Lynri created him.

Overwhelmed with an existential crisis, Quincy is sent out by Lynri to view her memories so that he can understand the situation. As a young child, Lynri was prone to sudden blackouts and was eventually diagnosed with a rare genetic disorder that could become malignant with little warning. Isolated from her peers by the knowledge of her condition, Lynri devoted herself to studying neuroscience, specifically research on encoding human memories into computers. In college, Lynri meets Quincy for the first time. The Quincy observing the memories is shocked, as he has no recollection of any of the events he is seeing.

As time passes, Lynri and Quincy grow close. Despite knowing what Lynri's condition would mean for both of them, Quincy and Lynri fall in love and start dating. On graduation day, Lynri is approached by representatives from the Yu-Haynes Foundation over a research paper she had published. Offered an illustrious and lucrative job by the Foundation, Lynri and Quincy move in together. Lynri immediately begins to work with the Foundation on developing technology that would interface directly with human memories, while Quincy takes on a domestic role at their home.

As Lynri progressed in her career, her job began demanding more and more of her time, causing friction between her and Quincy. The Foundation offers for Lynri to live within the mansion's residential complex to remove her commute, as some other employees do, but she is uncertain. One day, Lynri arrives late to a disastrous product demonstration for investors, where a colleague is unexpectedly killed by a memory-interfacing prototype. While Foundation leaders and their investors heatedly debate about the device and its apparent hazards, Lynri, knowing that she was originally assigned to test the device in the demonstration, immediately quits her job and returns home.

Overwhelmed with the realization that she could have died that day regardless of her health, Lynri decides to travel the world with Quincy, finally fulfilling a long-time goal of theirs. Upon returning home, Lynri learns that she is pregnant. Though Lynri is concerned with her disorder's possible effects on her and the unborn child, she and Quincy ultimately decide to go through with it. However, Lynri's condition suddenly becomes acute late into her pregnancy. She is forced to choose between giving birth prematurely to have a time-sensitive life-saving operation, or to postpone the operation to allow her child a healthy birth, which could possibly render the operation ineffective. Lynri chooses the former.

Tobias Reynard is born prematurely to Lynri and Quincy. Unable to walk and on oxygen support, Tobias is raised with all the love that his family can give him, but ultimately dies of health complications as a young child. Heartbroken and guilt-ridden, Lynri and Quincy start drifting apart. Eventually, Lynri leaves Quincy without a word to return to work at the Foundation, having moved to its residential complex. She ignores Quincy's attempts to reconcile and devotes all her time to working on the memory interfacing technology. Many years later, one day prior to a product launch of the technology, Lynri decides to run another test on the device. She samples her own memories to recreate an early version of Quincy that would serve as a test character, thus explaining the version of Quincy that the player controls.

Finished with observing Lynri's life story, Quincy returns to the simulation of the mansion where present-day Lynri explains that the murders he had observed earlier were errors in the simulation that she has been trying to correct. Quincy agrees to help her and Lynri briefly exits the simulation. When Lynri returns and Quincy finishes doing all the tasks she had set for him, they are both confronted by Faye. (Note: Faye first appeared in a previous instalment, Finding Paradise.)

Lynri realizes through a conversation with Faye that she, too, is not the real 'Lynri', and that even her world is merely part of a recursive simulation. Other instances of Lynri have launched simulations of themselves on their own memory devices, who in turn then recursively launch more simulations of themselves. Faye informs them that the wider simulation has nearly grown too complex for the real-world computer to handle and that she had been killing Yu and Haynes in this layer to prevent the creation of new simulation layers. She also explains that she has been tasked with ending the entire simulation. However, before doing so, Faye tells the duo that this final simulation was allowed to run because its events closely followed that of reality outside the simulation.

The real Lynri chose to delay her operation to have a healthy baby, bearing her last name per Quincy's suggestion, named Neil Watts. (Note: A co-protagonist in both To the Moon and Finding Paradise.) Because she chose to delay her operation, Lynri's condition became terminal. Towards the end of her life, she returned to the Foundation to use their machine to preserve her memories for her son, but they became inaccessible after her death due to technical issues. Neil, later diagnosed with the same disorder as his mother, would eventually find employment with Sigmund Corp. (which had licensed the imperfect memory machine to grant wishes to the dying) so that he could gain experience working on memory machines with the ultimate goal of unlocking his mother's memories. Neil eventually succeeded, resulting in the current simulation of Lynri and Quincy.

At this point, Faye ends the wider simulation. She offers the duo the opportunity to live in a simulation of a perfect life. After some convincing, Lynri agrees to go with Quincy. The two then live a life free of troubles: Lynri's condition is permanently cured, the duo remains happily married, Neil grows up healthy, marries Eva Rosalene, and has a child of his own. In their old age, Lynri and Quincy express their gratitude towards Faye. Faye assures them that the real Neil Watts is still watching over them and briefly celebrates their good life. The simulation then permanently ends.

In the post-credits scene, the real Dr. Neil Watts talks to Faye about what constitutes a perfect world, and whether or not the simulation of his parents was perfect by any standard. He is eventually interrupted by his Sigmund colleagues at his door, inviting him for a casual hangout. Neil heads out with them.

== Development and release ==
Impostor Factory was first announced in March 2019, though it was not yet confirmed whether the game would be a part of the Sigmund Corp. series. The official trailer premiered in August 2020. It prominently features an unnamed lady in a red dress, presumably the same one featured in the promotional posters.

In November 2020, Kan Gao announced that the release date was pushed back from the end of 2020 to spring 2021. An update on the game's Steam page pushed the release back to September. The game released on September 30, 2021.

Laura Shigihara, whose vocals were featured in the previous major installments, is noticeably uncredited as her voice wasn't suited for the game's darker elements.

== Reception ==
Reception

Aggregate score
Aggregator	Score
Metacritic	80/100

Impostor Factory has received generally positive reception, with a score of 80 out of 100 on review aggregator Metacritic, averaged from 13 critic reviews, indicating "generally favorable" reviews.

Damaso Scibetta of IGN Italia gave a positive review, saying: "Gao's writing is always impeccable and is capable of never falling into the banal, even when it touches themes already abused in the medium and in narration in general."

Bob Richardson of RPG Fan also gave a positive review, saying: "It's akin to going into an art gallery and scoring each painting or sculpture, and while that seems like I'm laying the praise on a bit thick, I genuinely feel this way."
