= Sex Playlist =

Studio album by Omarion
- Released: December 2, 2014
- Recorded: 2012–14
- Genre: R&B
- Length: 45:34
- Labels: Maybach Music; Atlantic
- Producers: DJ Mustard; Da Internz; Eric Hudson; Monz Logan; Rock City; Tank; Jevon Hill; Pop & Oak; Swiff D; D&D; Davion Henry; The Co-Captains

Omarion chronology
Ollusion (2010)	Sex Playlist (2014)	The Kinection (2020)

Singles from Sex Playlist
- 1. "You Like It" Released: February 14, 2014; 2. "Post to Be" Released: November 11, 2014

Sex Playlist is the fourth studio album by American singer Omarion. The album was released on December 2, 2014 under Maybach Music Group and Atlantic Records. The album serves as the follow-up to his third album, Ollusion (2010).

== Background ==
In November 2014, Omarion released the track listing and release date for the album. This album is his first full-length release from Maybach Music Group. He later released the album cover artwork which features Apryl Jones, Omarion's girlfriend, straddling him.

Omarion described the album as more mature and concept driven then his previous releases. He said, "It's not about just having a sex playlist, it's about having the right sex playlist, because you can't have sex without love… It's not just about the lustful idea of sex. It's a playlist for the lovers."

== Singles ==
The album's lead single, titled "You Like It", was released on February 14, 2014.

The album's second single "Post to Be" featuring Chris Brown and Jhené Aiko, was released on November 11, 2014. The song became a hit, peaking number 13 on the US Billboard Hot 100 and has since received triple platinum certification by the Recording Industry Association of America (RIAA).

== Critical reception ==
Professional ratings
Review scores
Source	Rating
AllMusic	4/5 stars
Complex	3.5/5 stars

Sex Playlist received positive reviews by music critics. Andy Kellman of AllMusic said "After some snags, Omarion finally released his first Maybach Music Group album, Sex Playlist, in late 2014. While it was issued only as a digital download, it deserved a full promotional push and physical release from Maybach parent label Atlantic, as it was one of the year's best sets of contemporary R&B. True to its title, Sex Playlist is more slow jam-oriented than any of Omarion's Epic and EMI albums." Justin Charity from Complex called the album "one of the most mature, refined, restrained male R&B projects from a major artist" from 2014. He went on to say that Omarion sounded more evolved and the album was more sincere and coherent.

== Commercial performance ==
Sex Playlist debuted at number 49 on the US Billboard 200, selling 16,000 copies with minimal album promotion. In its second week, the album sold 5,000 more copies. After the release of the clip, the album re-entered the Billboard 200 and went on to sell over 23,000 copies in the United States. On December 13, 2014, Sex Playlist peaked at number two on the US R&B Albums Chart.

== Track listing ==
No.	Title	Writer(s)	Producer(s)	Length
1.	"Sex Playlist"	Omari Grandberry	Eric Hudson	4:25
2.	"Post to Be" (featuring Chris Brown and Jhené Aiko)	Grandberry; Christopher Brown; Jhené Chilombo; Dijon McFarlane; Tyrone Griffin	DJ Mustard	3:46
3.	"Show Me" (featuring Jeremih)	Grandberry	Da Internz; L&F	3:54
4.	"Inside"	Grandberry	Hudson	3:49
5.	"Steam"	Grand berry	Hudson	3:36
6.	"The Only One..."	Grandberry	Rock City; The Co-Captains Jevon Hill	3:21
7.	"Boss" (featuring Rick Ross)	Al Sherrod Lambert; Roberts	L&F	3:35
8.	"Work"	Grandberry	Hudson	4:28
9.	"Deeper" (featuring James Fauntleroy)	Grandberry	Hudson; Davion Henry	3:58
10.	"Don't Leave"	Grandberry	Tank	3:29
11.	"You Like It"	Grandberry	Henry; Pop & Oak; Ronald "Flippa" Colson	4:22
12.	"Love & Other Drugs"	Grandberry	Swiff D; D&D	3:06
13.	"Already"	Grandberry	L&F	2:25

== Charts ==
Weekly chart performance for Sex Playlist
Chart (2014)	Peak position
UK R&B Albums (Official Charts)	28
US Billboard 200	49
US Top R&B/Hip-Hop Albums (Billboard)	5
