= The Pressure (song) =

Single by Jhené Aiko

from the album Souled Out
- Released: July 18, 2014
- Recorded: Fisticuffs Gym (Culver City, California)
- Genre: Alternative R&B; hip hop
- Length: 3:59
- Label: Def Jam; Artium
- Songwriters: Jhené Aiko Chilombo; Brian "Fisticuffs" Warfield; Mac "Fisticuffs" Robinson
- Producer: Fisticuffs

Jhené Aiko singles chronology
"To Love & Die" (2014)	"The Pressure" (2014)	"Post to Be" (2014)

"The Pressure" is a song by American singer Jhene Aiko, taken from her debut studio album, Souled Out (2014). The song premiered on Vogue magazine's website and was released for digital download on July 17, 2014, as the second single from the album through ARTium Recordings and Def Jam Recordings. The song was written by Aiko, while production was handled by longtime collabarotors Mac Robinson and Brian Warfield under their production name Fisticuffs. Backed by a guitar-tinged, hip-hop production containing synths, metallic slaps and a shaky beat "The Pressure" is an alternative R&B song that thematically revolves around Aiko's stress of finishing her debut album.

Upon release The Pressure was met with generally positive reviews from music critics; who commended the song's lyrical content, Aiko's vocals and the atmospheric production. Commercially the song did not fare well, only making an appearance on the US Hot R&B Songs chart. The song's accompanying video was released on September 2, 2014, and was directed by rapper Childish Gambino and Calmatic, during the video it depicts the challenges of being in a relationship and shows various scenes including Aiko drinking beer and eating pizza with her friends, writing songs and playing with her child, before changing to darker themes including friends fighting and lovers leaving. To further promote the song Aiko performed at the Streamy Awards 2014.

== Background ==
In 2011 Aiko revealed that her debut album would feature production from producers Fistcuffs, who helped produce the majority of Aiko's 2011 mixtape Sailing Soul(s). In 2014 Aiko revealed she worked with No I.D., Key Wayne, Fisticuffs and Dot Da Genius and stated she would only be working with them so the sound was cohesive, she also revealed that her and the producers were working together in order to "make sure each song goes well with the other". The song was written by Aiko herself, along with her frequent collaborators Mac Robinson and Brian Warfield while the latter two handled the song's production under their production name Fisticuffs. "The Pressure", premiered on vogue.com on July 17, 2014, and was released to ITunes a day later as the second official single on July 18, 2014.

== Composition ==
The Pressure is an alternative R&B song built over a "guitar-tinged", hip-hop production with a length of three minutes and fifty-nine seconds. The Pressure is a "smooth" song that moves along "subtly" and contains a guitar and a synth production, Gregory Adams of Exclaim noted the song's production as being "smooth and steady clack, airy, reverberated guitar noodling and the occasional shooting-star synth line". Christina Lee of Idolator described the song's production and musical style as containing "metallic slaps and a shaky beat". Ana Leorne, writing for The 405, highlighted the song's "cool, laid-back" production, which helps to highlight Aiko's vocals. According to Richard of DJ Booth "The Pressure" contains "layering wavy guitar riffs and ambient synths over a deliberate percussion".

Lyrically the song was inspired by the Aiko's stress of finishing her debut album, during her first verse Aiko "maintains her cool" exhaling deeply, however during the song Aiko's lyrics become "sharper" with this concept being introduced in the lyric "You are such a liar / I never denied you, I was for sure," following the sharper verse Aiko becomes "flat-out dismissive". The lyric "I don't wanna see you go, but I don't have time to solve this / And you don't have the right" was interpreted by a reviewer from Direct Lyrics as Aiko reflecting on the "difficulty and stress she experienced while putting the finishing touches on "Souled Out"."

== Reception ==
Upon release The Pressure was met with generally positive reviews from music critics. Jeff Benjamin of Fuse TV praised the singles production and compared it to the work of alternative R&B singer Miguel, Benjamin also praised Aiko's vocals noting them as "spine-tingling". Christina Lee of Idolator praised the song's production and commended the song's lyrical content especially the "sharper" lyrics. Gregory Adams of Exclaim gave the song praise calling the song "steamy" and praised the song's smooth and subtle production, Adams further gave praise to Aiko's delivery of the song's lyrics which he described as being done "cooly [sic?]".

Dimas Sanfiorenzo of Global Grind gave the song a mixed review praising the song over all, but believed the song was too similar to Aiko's previous work, however Brandon TNT West of Global Grind listed the song on his "Top 5 Tracks of the Week" and wrote an extensive review of the song and noted the song's musical style as having a "lightly trippy mood" that works well with Aiko's vocals continuing to say "If you can picture a ball of cotton landing softly on freshly fallen snow on a cold January night, you can sense the vibe in The Pressure." Elle Breezy of the singers room compared the song to Aiko's single "The Worst" stating that both songs have similar "cool jazziness" tones.

== Music video ==
On September 2, 2014, Aiko released the song's accompanying video which was directed by rapper Childish Gambino and Calmatic, the song's video depicts the challenges of being in a relationship. During the video Aiko is seen with blonde dreads and features a cameo from her daughter Namiko. The video starts around a dimly lit Aiko, as the camera rolls through a series of vignettes, the scenes consist of the singer drinking beer and eating pizza with her friends, enjoying an herbal refreshment with a gentleman on a couch, writing songs and playing with her child. The scenes then begin to tick up tension, with friends fighting, lovers leaving and Aiko sending her child off to celebrate a birthday without her, this is followed by Aiko fading out. Mike Wass of Idolator praised the song's video, commended the visual for capturing the song's "languid, confessional vibe", continuing to praise the videos "slight psychedelic twist" which Wass called "interesting".

== Track listing ==
Digital download

- The Pressure - 3:59

== Credits ==
Credits adapted from All Music.

- Jhené Aiko - Primary Artist, Composer
- Mac Robinson - Composer
- Brian Warfield - Composer

== Charts ==
The Pressure debuted at twenty five on the US Hot R&B Songs chart, the following week the song rose to twenty three with 528,000 U.S. streams a 177 percent jump.

Chart (2014)	Peak position
US Hot R&B Songs (Billboard)	23

== Certifications ==
Region	Certification	Certified units/sales
United States (RIAA)	Gold	500,000^{‡}
^{‡} Sales+streaming figures based on certification alone.

== Release history ==
Country	Date	Format	Label
United States	July 18, 2014	Digital download	Island Def Jam Music Group
