= Cocaine 80s =

American hip hop group

Cocaine 80's
- Also known as: The 80s
- Origin: Chicago, Illinois, U.S.
- Genres: Alternative hip hop; R&B; psychedelic pop
- Years active: 2011–2015
- Labels: ARTium; Def Jam
- Past members: No I.D. Common; Jhené Aiko; Kevin Randolph; Anomaly; Makeba Riddick; Rob Kinelski; Sam Lewis; Anna Ugarte; Omar Loya; Blake Douglas; James Fauntleroy
- Website: cocaine80s.com

Cocaine 80's was an American hip hop collective founded in 2011, by record producer No I.D. With James Fauntleroy serving as lead singer on each song, the group has collectively released four full-length projects: The Pursuit EP (2011), Ghost Lady EP (2011), Express OG EP (2012) and The Flower of Life (2013).

== History ==
On June 22, 2011, an extended play (EP) titled Cocaine 80s: The Pursuit, surfaced online. The Pursuit EP features vocals from Steve Wyreman, Rob Kinelski, Kevin Randolph, James Fauntleroy, Makeba Riddick and more. On October 21, 2011, another EP was released, titled Cocaine 80s: Ghost Lady. In December 2011, Chicago-bred rapper Common released his ninth album, The Dreamer/The Believer. The album was produced entirely by No I.D. and features additional vocal from Makeba Riddick and James Fauntleroy, on several tracks. In October 2012, Jhené Aiko revealed to The Singers Room that she is recording a project with No I.D. and the rest of Cocaine 80s and that they would also be featured on her upcoming Def Jam debut, Souled Out: "Me and the Cocaine 80s is made up of musicians, singers and producers. I told them I wanted to be a part of the Cocaine 80s. I wanted to be the female voice of the group. They will be featured on 'Souled Out'. Yes, we are definitely working on a mixtape or album together. That is definitely in the works." In June 2014, "To Love & Die", the first single from Aiko's debut album was released, which credits Cocaine 80s as the featured performers.

On June 21, 2024, The Pursuit was released on streaming services, under the artist name 'The 80s'.

== Discography ==
=== EPs ===
Cocaine 80s: The Pursuit (2011)

- Track listing
1. "Nameless"
2. "Summer Madness"
3. "To Tell You the Truth"
4. "Get You Some"
5. "Not No More"
6. "Nothing"
7. "Anywhere but Here"
8. "Like a Fool (Birdsong)"

Cocaine 80s: Ghost Lady (2011)

- Track listing
1. "The Fall"
2. "Six Feet Over"
3. "Missing Me from Heaven"
4. "Not No More (Part II)"
5. "Tomorrow"
6. "Loved to Death"
7. "The Legend of the Heart"

Cocaine 80s: Express OG (2012)

- Track listing
1. "Queen to Be"
2. "Take My Keys"
3. "This Can't Be a Crime"
4. "Chain Glow"
5. "Unchain Me / Love 3x"
6. "Motivation"

Cocaine 80's: The Flower of Life (2013)

- Track listing
1. "Kuro to Shiro"
2. "The Distant River"
3. "Ground"
4. "The Sun and the Moon"
5. "Fly Ass Pisces"
6. "Higher Self"
7. "Lucid"

=== Singles ===
List of singles, with selected chart positions, showing year released and album name
Title	Year	Peak chart positions		Certifications	Album
Title	Year	US	US R&B/HH	Certifications	Album
"To Love & Die" (Jhene Aiko featuring Cocaine 80s)	2014	—	—		Souled Out
"—" denotes a title that did not chart, or was not released in that territory.

=== Guest appearances ===
List of non-single guest appearances, with other performing artists, showing year released and album name
Title	Year	Other artist(s)	Album
"Where's the Love"	2012	Nas	Life Is Good
"Pain"	2012	Mikkey Halsted	Castro
"Higher"	2012	The-Dream, Pusha T, Mase	Cruel Summer
"Enormous"	2013	HS87, Travis Scott, Kent Money	All I've Ever Dreamed Of
"The Neighborhood"	2014	Common, Lil Herb	Nobody's Smiling
"Young Hearts Run Free"	2014	Common	Nobody's Smiling
