= Souled Out (Jhené Aiko album) =

2014 studio album by Jhené Aiko

Studio album by Jhené Aiko
- Released: September 9, 2014
- Studios: 4220 (Hollywood); Fisticuffs Gym (Culver City)
- Genre: Alternative R&B
- Length: 49:17
- Labels: ArtClub; ARTium; Def Jam
- Producers: Dot da Genius; Fisticuffs; Key Wane; No I.D.

Jhené Aiko chronology
Sail Out (2013)	Souled Out (2014)	Twenty88 (2016)

Singles from Souled Out
- 1. "To Love & Die" Released: June 24, 2014; 2. "The Pressure" Released: July 18, 2014; 3. "Spotless Mind" Released: January 21, 2015

Souled Out is the debut studio album by American singer-songwriter Jhené Aiko. It was released on September 9, 2014, by ArtClub International, ARTium Recordings, and Def Jam Recordings. After leaving Epic Records in 2003, Aiko took a hiatus from her music career and returned in 2011, with the release of her debut mixtape Sailing Soul(s). After raising her profile with the mixtape, Aiko met with record producer No I.D., and subsequently secured a recording contract with his newly found record label imprint, ARTium. Following her record deal, Aiko immediately began working on the album; during the recording process, Aiko released her debut EP Sail Out (2013), to bridge the gap between her mixtape and the album.

Souled Out is an alternative R&B album with a diverse musical style that incorporates psychedelic music, R&B, neo soul, hip hop, and elements of electronica. Its songs are loosely structured and feature electronic guitar sounds, synths, drums and atmospheric noises. A concept album, Souled Out features the evolution of a woman's heartbreak before becoming enlightened, the album features lyrics that revolve around relationships, life lessons, philosophies and truths. Aiko served as the album's executive producer and wrote the album's lyrics; she contracted four key producers to contribute with production and help create a cohesive sound.

An anticipated release, Souled Out was released to be a commercial and critical success. The album debuted at number three on the US Billboard 200, selling 70,000 copies, doubling the first week sales of her debut EP; the album also debuted at number one on the US Top R&B/Hip-Hop Albums. It received generally positive reviews from critics, who commended its production, lyrics and themes and was ranked as one of the best albums of 2014 by several publications. The album spawned three singles—"To Love & Die", "The Pressure", and "Spotless Mind".

== Background ==
In 2003, Aiko released a video for her debut single "NO L.O.V.E", when she was 15 years old. Aiko was set to release her debut album, then-titled My Name Is Jhené, however the album was never released due to tension at the record label Epic, which ultimately led to Aiko asking to be released from the label. She then began to focus on school and continue her education. Following the birth of her daughter, Aiko began to make her return to music in 2008 and began meeting with labels. In 2011, she released her debut mixtape Sailing Soul(s), which was received well by critics and was certified Gold by mixtape-sharing website DatPiff, for downloads of 100,000. In 2012, Aiko met with No I.D., record producer and vice president of A&R at Def Jam, who ended up signing Aiko to his ARTium Recordings imprint through Def Jam, Aiko revealed that she has signed to Def Jam via her official Twitter account. Following Aiko's signing to the label she released her debut extended play Sail Out (2013). The EP was met with positive reviews from critics and debuted at number eight on the US Billboard 200 chart, with first-week sales of 34,000 copies in the United States.

== Writing and recording ==
Aiko stated that she was working on the album every day either recording or writing, but is taking her time as she doesn't want "to put out some nonsense". During the album's recording Aiko set up workshops in which she and the producers would talk about the songs in order to create a cohesive sound and the belief that the music is "from one artist and this culmination of minds that share the same vision". In April 2014, Aiko began recording her interviews in order to put something together to show her fan base the process of the album and "the work that went into it, and little random things". During the recording process of the album Aiko would write under the influence of cannabis in order to use the feeling as inspiration, and then record the song when she was sober, unlike her debut mixtape which she wrote and recorded under the influence.

I'll have a beat or sit with producers and we'll feed off of each other and I'll just keep singing a melody until I have words. There's not a lot of writing down—I'll only write it down to make sure it makes sense after I come up with it. For the most part, I like to not have second thoughts.

— Aiko, speaking on the album's recording process

During the recording of the album Aiko opted to freestyle when writing the album, she would have a beat or would sit with producers and she would sing a melody until she had words, she described the process as not having a lot wrote down and any writing that was done, was done to make sure the songs made sense. On average Aiko was writing and recording four songs a month and in February she stated she was going to write and record at least ten more songs; she also said she had enough material for an album but would continue to record. Aiko did a large proportion of studio sessions with her daughter in which Aiko would record and sing directly at her daughter, as well as writing verses about her late brother.

Aiko described "Spotless Mind" as being the easiest song to write; the song was written while Aiko was touring with Lauryn Hill and Nas in 45 minutes using GarageBand. Aiko also revealed that "Eternal Sunshine" and "Spotless Mind" titles were inspired by the 2004 film Eternal Sunshine of the Spotless Mind. During the recording of the album Aiko released her debut extended play using some of the material she has intended for her debut. In June 2014, Aiko revealed that only Cocaine 80s and her daughter Namiko would feature on the album. During an interview with Rolling Stone magazine, Aiko revealed the recording process for "Promise" and having her daughter as a guest feature: "I practice my songs in the car, and she's usually in the back seat, so she knows them", continuing to say, "I brought her in the studio and said, 'Remember that song we've been singing?' and recorded the song from there".

Aiko revealed that she had been sent many songs for her debut, saying, "I've been getting so many tracks lately and I'm not used to that. I'm used to just having a handful to work with but now that the label (Def Jam) is involved, they're sending me so much great stuff and I've just been writing and writing and writing!" In 2014, Aiko revealed she worked with No I.D., Key Wane, Fisticuffs and Dot da Genius and stated she would only be working with them so the sound was cohesive; she also revealed that her and the producers were working together in order to "make sure each song goes well with the other". During the album's production Aiko embarked on creating a more "intricate" sound with the use of live instruments. In November 2013, during an interview with Vice, Aiko stated that the album's production was done and all that was needed was finished touches and mixing; she also revealed that she would still continue to record new material.

== Music ==
Souled Out, a conceptual chronicling of the singer's journey from darkness to light, rooted in tales of tragedy and spiritual awakening. Aiko's newfound style lies somewhere between the soothing sounds of Sade and what can be nebulously described as "future R&B," a broad spectrum of pioneering music-makers making tunes best served in the midnight hour, including The Weeknd, Tinashe and FKA Twigs.

— Bradley Stern, Time

An alternative R&B album, Souled Out explores a variety of genres including psychedelic music, classic R&B and hip hop. Described by Erin Lowers from XXL, Souled Out is an alternative R&B album, described as being created with the use of heavily used synthesizers and "wooly drum loops". Lowers said the album's genre is caught in a "revolutionized limbo". The album's songs blend the neo soul, hip hop and electronica genres into downbeat, loosely structured soundscapes according to Julia Leconte of Now. Siyabonga Dube of News24 described Souled Out as being a combination of "diverse" sounds and genres, noting the incorporation of hip hop, R&B, alternative, and elements of electronic, describing the album's genre as being a "new age of music". Bradley Stern of Time compared the album's musical style to the work of Sade, calling the album's genre "future R&B"; Stern also compared Souled Out to the work of The Weeknd, Tinashe and FKA Twigs.

The album's production has been characterized as being expansive, endearing, and enigmatic. Troy L. Smith of The Plain Dealer called the album's production one of the "strongest points", noting the album's electronic guitar sounds, synths, drums and atmospheric noises. Lowers described the album's production as being "silky psychedelic", channeling spaced out melodies and hypnotic synths. Stern noted the album's production as having stretches of instrumentation that contain slow-burning and "honey-soaked" melodies, flowing from start to finish, comparative to a "modern meditative chant". According to Rick Florino of Artistdirect, Aiko sings with a soulful delivery and raw emotionality throughout the album. Aiko's vocals were described as fusing "perfectly" with the album's production, in which they float over the album's beats creating a "luminous aura". Other critics compared Aiko's vocals to that of Aaliyah's noting a similar falsetto and Aiko's ability to "convey a sultry innocence" with her voice. Dana Moran of RedEye described Aiko's voice as "velvety", continuing to call her vocals "husky and sleek, guarded and seductive". Andy Kellman of AllMusic described Aiko's vocals as being seductive, noting Aiko's wistful tones on songs like "Eternal Sunshine" and "Spotless Mind", as well as her injections of sharp and contrasting "melodrama" on "To Love & Die" with only minor variations in her tone.

== Lyrics ==
Souled Out is a concept album that goes through an evolution, something Aiko described as a "path". The album tells the story of a woman going through heartbreak, confusion, and being in a dark place before becoming enlightened and growing. Aiko stated the album's lyrical content revolves around relationships, life lessons, philosophies and truths. The album also touches upon vulnerable insights of Aiko's personal life such as her fears as a single parent and the death of her brother Miyagi. In an in-depth review of the album's lyrics Ken Capobianco of The Boston Globe wrote;

The set is smartly conceived with a finely calibrated continuity as her songs reflect a young woman in search of life's foundations; through 14 tracks she traces the vicissitudes of love, journeying from promise through hurt into hope. Aiko's producers, including No I.D. and Dot da Genius, create expansive, inventive tracks that mirror the allure of her lithe vocals and intimate phrasing. Aiko demonstrates remarkable honesty and confidence. The songs are often grounded in frank sexuality, and filled with healthy contradictions as she navigates her way to the wonder.

Brad Wete of Billboard called the album's lyrical style sharp and noted its wordplay; Wete also described the album as "insular" with lyrics containing "cuts" that "run deep, searing with spite and indifference", continuing to note the album's themes as revolving around love interests, inward thinking and "chronicling her wearisome romantic history". Erin Lowers from XXL noted relationships, dreams, and aspirations as the three main concepts layered throughout the album. Bradley Stern from Time, called the album's lyrical content "occasionally snappy", which he described as keeping the otherwise "gentle pulsations" of the album feeling "fresh" and "employing expressions".

== Songs ==
The album opens with "Limbo Limbo Limbo", built over "twinkling keys and tumbling drums"; the song's lyrics revolve around a man who "has got too big for his britches." "W.A.Y.S." is an acronym for Aiko's late brother's Miyagi's favorite saying, "Why Aren't You Smiling?". "W.A.Y.S." is built over crashing sounds over a hip hop production and contains underlying string instruments and echoed drumbeats, with lyrics that speak about Aiko having a "bright future" and for her to shake "off negative thoughts." "To Love & Die" is a contemporary R&B song with an "atmospheric" and "sparse" production and R&B "textures." Built over a "dark and melodic" production that contains "tripping drum loops and hypnotic, spacey synthesisers," the song also interpolates American rapper 50 Cent's 2003 cult classic song "Many Men (Wish Death)". Lyrically the song revolves around love and affection. "Spotless Mind" is a "smooth" track built over a "chill beat" and contains an "island vibe". The song is predominately an R&B track that is backed by a "funky bass, gentle rhythm and acoustic guitars" inspired by soft rock. Lyrically Aiko wanders into a reverie, in which she discusses different love and mental rest stops that she's visited.

"It's Cool" is a breezy R&B track that contains bluesy riff and instrumentals and lyrically describes Aiko developing love for a man who was initially just a physical interest. "Lyin King" contains a fluid production, built over synths, the track is a bass-heavy song with lyrics directed to an ex-lover. "Lying King" uses the metaphor of a lion to emphasise Aiko's "pain she feels, saying he steals hearts and feeds them to his pride." "Wading" is a mid tempo song, with a "dreamy" production, lyrically Aiko speaks on the idea of a man watching the girl he wants drift away because he's afraid to step up and be great. During the song Aiko samples a Tupac verse and turns it into a metaphor for "losing her love", during the end of the song "Wading" becomes ambient and Aiko's voice echoes and fades out. "The Pressure" is an alternative R&B song built over a hip-hop production, containing guitars and synths, and backed by "metallic slaps and a shaky beat." Lyrically the song was inspired by the Aiko's stress of finishing her debut album.

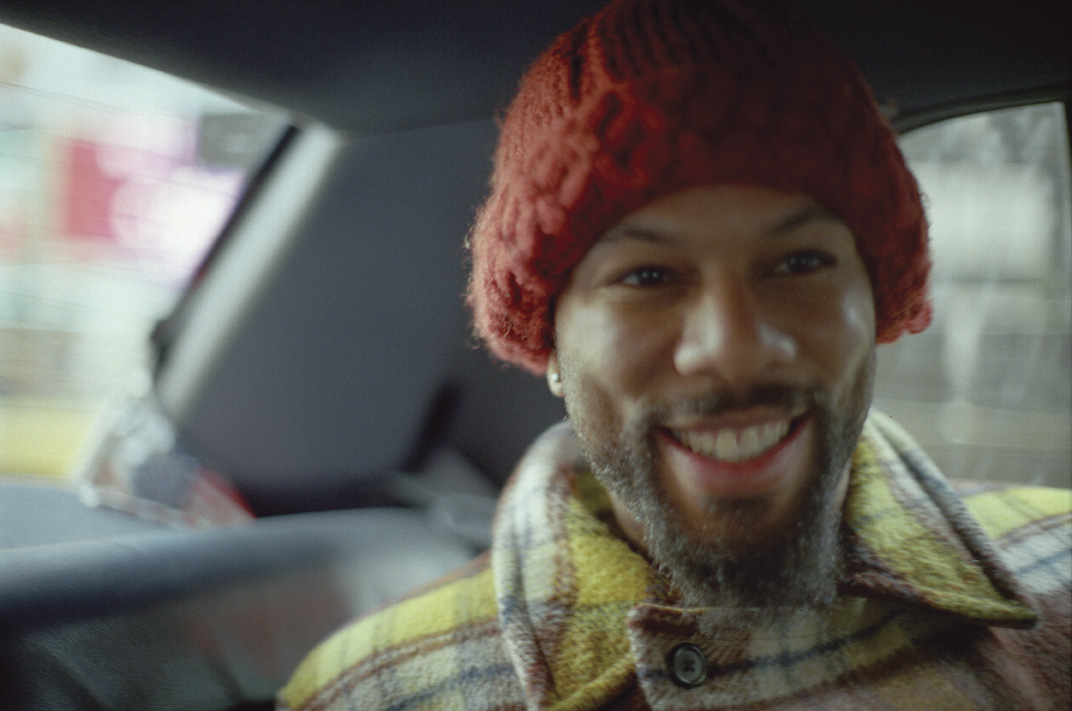
The standard album's closing track "Pretty Bird" features a verse from American rapper Common.

"Brave" is a hip hop song backed by a surf guitar. The song is built around inflections of a horn, which was compared to the work of Sade. The song's lyrics are "dark", in which Aiko describes the danger of loving who she is. "Eternal Sunshine" is backed by a "hypnotic piano riff". "Promises" is produced by mentor No I.D. and features Aiko's daughter Namiko performing part of the hook. Lyrically, it is a message to Aiko's daughter and late brother. "Promises" contains an electric guitar infused backdrop provided by Norwegian electronic duo Röyksopp; the song also features vocals from her late brother. The album closes with "Pretty Bird" which features American rapper Common, making it the second time the pair have worked together after Aiko previously featured on "Black Majik" from his 2014 album Nobody's Smiling. Described as a pop rap song, Erin Lowers of XXL called the song "dynamic" and compared it to Nina Simone's "Blackbird"; lyrically "Pretty Bird" sees Aiko singing about the troubles she's faced to get here.

The standard deluxe edition contains two bonus tracks, "Remember" and "Blue Dream". "Blue Dream" was initially released in March 2014, as "My Afternoon Dream" with production by Key Wane. The song's lyrical content was described as revolving around Aiko losing herself in blissful thoughts of a man. However, Aiko revealed that the song's lyrics were written about "Blue Dream", a strain of Cannabis sativa. The song was later renamed and featured new production courtesy of No I.D. The album's Target exclusive edition also contains two extra songs; the first being "Beautiful Ruin" which features live guitar from Steve Wyreman, with production built around the guitar by No I.D. The second song is an acoustic version of "You vs. Them", a song originally recorded by Aiko for her debut mixtape Sailing Soul(s). The song features just Aiko's vocals and a guitar.

== Release and promotion ==
In May 2012, Aiko revealed that her debut would be released that summer, but the album never emerged. On November 12, 2013, Aiko released her debut extended play Sail Out as a bridge between her debut mixtape Sailing Soul(s) and her debut studio album. In a January 2014, interview with Vibe, Aiko announced her debut studio album Souled Out would be released in May 2014. However, the album was again delayed. Aiko titled the album as a follow-up to her mixtape Sailing Soul(s) (2011) and extended play Sail Out (2013), the former was titled Sailing Soul(s) due to having dealt with record labels who intended to change Aiko's image she described the title as "sailing one's soul, or rising above the negativity, instead of selling it." The album follows on the theme with Aiko stating that "Souled Out" is what happens once you "sail your soul," continuing to say, "You're Souled Out and completely free. And your Soul is on an infinite free ride." Aiko announced that the album will feature twelve to thirteen tracks as well as bonus songs. Aiko revealed during an interview with Vibe that the track listing would be ordered in a journey, with the later tracks featuring themes of the meaning of life.

On March 16, 2014, Aiko premiered a song entitled "My Afternoon Dream" along with an accompanying music video directed by Aiko and Krissy. During Aiko's performance in April at the 2014 Coachella Valley Music and Arts Festival, she premiered a live rendition of "Spotless Mind" including her band and a string quartet. Aiko performed "The Worst" with John Legend at the BET 14th annual ceremony at the Nokia Theatre L.A. On June 26, Aiko and frequent collaborator Schoolboy Q were announced as a supporting act for Canadian singer-songwriter The Weeknd's King of the Fall Tour, consisting of four shows. On July 8, it was speculated that Souled Out would be released on August 25, 2014. Aiko stated in an interview with Complex that she would not "rush" the album and also revealed that the album was set for an August 2014 release. On August 13, Aiko released the album's cover art and track listing and announced the album's release date as September 9, 2014, coinciding with The Weeknd's King of the Fall Tour.

The album's artwork was released on August 5, 2014, and features Aiko in between water and the sky as her soul rises upwards. Melissa Tropnas of Global Grind described the cover as "ethereal" and a reviewer form Rap-Up described it as "celestial." Bradley Stern of Idolator called the cover art an "accurate representation" of Aiko's music. On August 18, Aiko released the song "Spotless Mind" onto iTunes as a pre-order leading up to the album's release. On September 2, the album was made available for streaming through iTunes. On October 23, Aiko announced that she would be headlining the Enter the Void tour with support by SZA and The Internet. The month-long tour started December 2, in Washington, D.C., with stops in New York, Philadelphia, Toronto, Chicago, and two dates at L.A.'s Club Nokia. The 13 dates ended on December 21 in Minneapolis. On February 13, 2015, Aiko was announced as a special guest on the European leg of rapper J. Cole's Forest Hills Drive Tour.

=== Singles ===
Four singles were released from the album. "To Love & Die" was released on June 24, 2014, as the lead single from the album. The album's second single, "The Pressure", was released on iTunes on July 18, 2014. "Wading" was released as the album's first and only promotional single on December 12, 2014, along with an accompanying video. "Spotless Mind" was released on January 21, 2015, as the album's third single.

== Critical reception ==
Professional ratings
Aggregate scores
Source	Rating
Metacritic	76/100
Review scores
Source	Rating
AllMusic	3/5 stars
Billboard	4/5 stars
Clash	8/10
Entertainment Weekly	A−
Exclaim!	8/10
The Guardian	4/5 stars
HipHopDX	3.5/5
Now	3/5
Pitchfork	6.5/10
XXL	4/5

Souled Out was met with generally positive reviews. At Metacritic, which assigns a normalized rating out of 100 to reviews from mainstream publications, the album received an average score of 76, based on 10 reviews.

Kyle Anderson, writer for Entertainment Weekly, found the album to be more pop friendly that her debut extended play Sail Out, continuing to call the album a "parallel dimension where the future of R&B arrived a long time ago." Pitchfork's Craig Jenkins concluded "Souled Out capably buffs Jhené Aiko's strengths and shellacks her faults, but the moments where she steps out into the depth of her story transcend the synergy of a group of musicians with good chemistry." Marcus K. Dowling of HipHopDX felt Aiko's writing was "intentionally simple and evocative", continuing to say "you're as much sucked into wondering just what she's going to say next as much as you just want to hear a high-quality song." Tshepo Mokoena of The Guardian said, "She may purr like a revamped Ashanti, but she sounds tough as nails when it matters." Ken Capobianco from The Boston Globe concluded that "Aiko's producers, including No I.D. and Dot da Genius, create expansive, inventive tracks that mirror the allure of her lithe vocals and intimate phrasing."

Brad Wete of Billboard called the album as "party of one", continuing to state the album is "music to overthink with and lines to quote when angry at a significant other—the soundtrack for hard times." Ryan B. Patrick from Exclaim! stated that "Souled Out is an intriguing record from an intriguing artist who has tapped into the zeitgeist and delivered something that is both reflective and forward-looking." Erin Lowers from XXL called Aiko and the album a "breath of fresh air in a musical sea that's often changing tides and taking artists with it." Rick Florino of Artistdirect named Aiko as one of musics most "important voices", continuing to note Souled Out as being one of 2014's best albums. In a more mixed review Julia Leconte of Now said "It's nice to see Aiko atypically solo (Common provides the only rap feature), but more variety would be welcome." Although he praised the album's introspective themes, Andy Kellman of AllMusic felt that Aiko could be "maddeningly platitudinal and singsongy", however Kellman believed that Aiko's "one dimension is a specific balmy backdrop provided by no one else".

=== Accolades ===
Prior to the album's releases, Souled Out was placed at number 18 on Complex magazine's "Most Anticipated Albums of 2014." The album also made MTV's list of "Most Anticipated R&B albums of 2014." The album was placed at number 19 on The Guardian's list of the best albums of 2014. HuffPost listed Souled Out as one of the most overlooked albums of 2014, stating the album "serves to hint at her future potential." Gail Mitchell of Billboard noted Aiko and her debut has one of the albums to breakthrough and "make some noise" in the R&B genre.

== Commercial performance ==
Souled Out debuted at number three on the US Billboard 200, selling 70,000 copies in its first week, becoming that week's second highest debut. Souled Out doubled the first week sales of Aiko's debut extended play Sail Out. This also became Aiko's second US top-ten debut. The album also debuted at number one on the US Top R&B/Hip-Hop Albums. In its second week, the album dropped to number 15 on the chart, selling an additional 20,000 copies, bringing its two-week total to 90,000 copies. As of October 29, 2015, the album had sold 125,000 copies in the US. On November 30, 2020, the album was certified gold by the Recording Industry Association of America (RIAA) for combined sales and album-equivalent units of over 500,000 units in the United States.

== Track listing ==
Souled Out track listing
No.	Title	Writer(s)	Producer(s)	Length
1.	"Limbo Limbo Limbo"	Jhené Chilombo; Oladipo Omishore; Brinton "Woodro Skillson" Ewart	Dot da Genius; Woodro Skillson^{[a]}	4:19
2.	"W.A.Y.S."	Chilombo; Brian "Fisticuffs" Warfield; Mac "Fisticuffs" Robinson; Michael Volpe; Stephen Bruner	Fisticuffs; Thundercat^{[b]}; Clams Casino^{[b]}	3:58
3.	"To Love & Die" (featuring Cocaine 80s)	Chilombo; Robinson; Warfield; James Fauntleroy; Darrell Branch; Curtis Jackson; Luis Resto; Frederick Perren; Keni St. Lewis	Fisticuffs	3:23
4.	"Spotless Mind"	Chilombo; Ernest D. Wilson	No I.D.	4:28
5.	"It's Cool"	Chilombo; Wilson	No I.D.	3:55
6.	"Lyin King"	Chilombo; Warfield; Robinson	Fisticuffs	3:33
7.	"Wading"	Chilombo; Omishore	Dot da Genius	4:35
8.	"The Pressure"	Chilombo; Warfield; Robinson	Fisticuffs	3:57
9.	"Brave"	Chilombo; Wilson	No I.D.	3:52
10.	"Eternal Sunshine"	Chilombo; Dwane Weir II	Key Wane	3:30
11.	"Promises" (featuring Miyagi and Namiko)	Chilombo; Wilson; Svein Berge; Torbjørn Brundtland	No I.D.	4:58
12.	"Pretty Bird (Freestyle)" (featuring Common)	Chilombo; Lonnie Lynn; Wilson	No I.D.	4:49

Deluxe edition bonus tracks
No.	Title	Writer(s)	Producer(s)	Length
13.	"Remember"	Chilombo; Warfield; Robinson	Fisticuffs	3:18
14.	"Blue Dream"	Chilombo; Wilson	No I.D.	3:36

Target exclusive and UK edition
No.	Title	Writer(s)	Producer(s)	Length
15.	"You vs. Them [Acoustic]"	Chilombo		3:22
16.	"Beautiful Ruin"	Chilombo; Steve Wyreman	No I.D.	3:45

Notes

- ^{^[a]} signifies an additional producer
- ^{^[b]} signifies an co-producer

Sample credits

- "To Love & Die" contains an interpolation of "Many Men (Wish Death)", written by Darrell "Digga" Branch, Curtis Jackson, Luis Resto, Frederick Perren and Keni St. Lewis, performed by 50 Cent.
- "You vs. Them" is an acoustic version of a song originally performed by Aiko from her debut mixtape Sailing Soul(s).
- "Blue Dream" contains the same lyrics from "My Afternoon Dream" and contains a different beat.

== Personnel ==
Credits adapted from AllMusic.

- Jhené Aiko – primary artist, art direction, art producer, design, executive producer
- Ron Avant – keyboards
- Jim Caruana – engineer
- Maddox Chimm – mixing assistant
- Clams Casino – producer
- Cocaine 80s – featured artist
- Common – featured artist
- Claire Courchene – cello
- Casey Cuayo – assistant engineer, mixing assistant
- Brinton "Woodro Skillson" Ewart – additional production
- James Fauntleroy – vocals (background)
- Fisticuffs – engineer, producer
- Dot da Genius – producer
- Maximillian Jaeger – assistant engineer
- Jaycen Joshua – mixing
- Ryan Kaul – assistant engineer, mixing assistant
- Gimel "Young Guru" Keaton – mixing
- Ketrina 'Taz' Askew – executive producer
- Rob Kinelski – engineer, mixing
- Dave Kutch – mastering
- Paul Lane – package production
- Chris Le – art direction, art producer, design, package production
- Sam Lewis – assistant engineer, mixing assistant
- Tai Linzie – package production
- Nate Mercereau – French horn
- Miyagi – featured artist
- Namiko – featured artist
- Ross Netko – assistant engineer
- No I.D. – executive producer, producer
- Tom Peyton – percussion
- Christian Plata – engineer
- James Poyser – keyboards, piano
- Kevin Randolph – piano
- Gregg Rominiecki – engineer, vocals (background)
- Donnie Scantz – engineer
- Ben Schwier – organ, piano
- Josh Story – engineer
- Derek Taylor – percussion, timpani
- Thomas Lea – viola, violin
- Michael Law Thomas – engineer
- Thundercat – bass, producer
- Crystal Torres – trumpet
- Anna Ugarte – assistant engineer, mixing assistant
- Juan F. "Jef" Villaluna – guitar
- Key Wane – producer
- Brian Warfield – engineer
- Steve Wyreman – bass, bells, guitar, keyboards, synthesizer
- Courtney "Millimoto" Yamamoto – photography

== Charts ==
=== Weekly charts ===
Chart performance for Souled Out
Chart (2014)	Peak position
Australian Urban Albums (ARIA)	22
Canadian Albums (Billboard)	20
Dutch Albums (Album Top 100)	100
UK Albums (Official Charts)	23
UK R&B Albums (Official Charts)	2
US Billboard 200	3
US Top R&B/Hip-Hop Albums (Billboard)	1

=== Year-end charts ===
2014 year-end chart performance for Souled Out
Chart (2014)	Position
US Billboard 200	148
US Top R&B/Hip Hop Albums (Billboard)	32

2015 year-end chart performance for Souled Out
Chart (2015)	Position
US Top R&B/Hip-Hop Albums (Billboard)	73

== Certifications ==
Certifications for Souled Out
Region	Certification	Certified units/sales
United Kingdom (BPI)	Silver	60,000^{‡}
United States (RIAA)	Platinum	1,000,000^{‡}
^{‡} Sales+streaming figures based on certification alone.

== Release history ==
Release dates and formats for Souled Out
Region	Date	Label(s)	Format(s)	Edition	Ref
United Kingdom	September 8, 2014	ARTium; Def Jam	CD; digital download	Standard; deluxe	
Australia	September 8, 2014	ARTium; Def Jam	CD; digital download	Standard; deluxe	
United States	September 9, 2014	ARTium; Def Jam	CD; digital download	Standard; deluxe; Target edition	
South Africa	September 12, 2014	ARTium; Def Jam	CD; digital download	Standard; deluxe	

== See also ==
- Alternative R&B
- List of Billboard number-one R&B/hip-hop albums of 2014
