= Spotless Mind =

Single by Jhené Aiko

from the album Souled Out
- Released: January 21, 2015
- Recorded: 2014
- Genre: PBR&B
- Length: 4:29
- Label: Def Jam; Artium
- Songwriters: Jhené Aiko Chilombo; Ernest Dion Wilson
- Producer: No I.D.

Jhené Aiko singles chronology
"Post to Be" (2014)	"Spotless Mind" (2015)	"Sorry to Interrupt" (2015)

"Spotless Mind" is a song by American singer Jhene Aiko, taken from her first studio album, Souled Out (2014). The song premiered on August 18, 2014, and was released for digital download on August 19, 2014, as the first promotional single and pre-order song from the album through ARTium Recordings and Def Jam Recordings. The song was written by Aiko in forty-five minutes using GarageBand during her tour with Lauryn Hill and Nas, while the production was handled by frequent collaborator No. I.D..

"Spotless Mind" is an R&B song containing a "chill beat" and an "island vibe", backed by a "funky bass, gentle rhythm and acoustic guitars, the song lyrically speaks about Aiko being a wanderer. Upon release, "Spotless Mind" was met with generally positive reviews from music critics; who praised the song's lyrical content and Aiko's vocals, however, the reception was mixed when it came to the song's production.

The song's title is inspired by the 2004 film Eternal Sunshine of the Spotless Mind.

== Background ==
In 2014, Aiko revealed she worked with No I.D., Key Wayne, Fisticuffs and Dot Da Genius and stated she would only be working with them so the sound was cohesive, she also revealed that she and the producers were working together in order to "make sure each song goes well with the other." Aiko wrote the song while on tour with Lauryn Hill and Nas, and was written in 45 minutes using GarageBand. She later said that "Spotless Mind" was the easiest song on the album to write. Aiko also revealed that “Eternal Sunshine” and then “Spotless Mind" titles were inspired by a film entitled Eternal Sunshine of the Spotless Mind (2004). On August 19, 2014, the song was released through the iTunes Store as a promotional single from "Souled Out" in the United States, people who pre-ordered "Souled Out" at the iTunes Store received a free download of "Spotless Mind."

== Composition ==
"Spotless Mind" is a "smooth" track built over a "chill beat" and contains an "island vibe". The song is predominately an R&B track that is backed by a "funky bass, gentle rhythm and acoustic guitars" inspired by soft rock. Lyrically Aiko wanders into a reverie, which she discusses different love and mental rest stops that she's visited. The themes and concept of Aiko being a wanderer, are introduced with lyrics including "Started as a love song, 24 years in the making / Moving from place to place and I never really settled down".

== Reception ==
Upon release, "Spotless Mind" was met with generally positive reviews from music critics. A reviewer from antimusic praised the song and Aiko's vocals, the reviewer continued to commend the "chilled" production and inclusion of an electric guitar. Rose Lilah of the online publication hotnewhiphop.com also praised the song's laid-back production and noted the song's lyrics as being quotable. Darryl Robertson of Vibe magazine gave the song a positive review, calling the song "soothing" and praised the song's lyrical content. A reviewer from Rap-up noted the song's production as being "breezy".

A review from the Empty Lighthouse magazine praised the song calling it a "soulful masterpiece," continuing to praise the song's "masterful" production. The reviewer also compared the song to Lil Waynes, "How To Love," not in similarities between both the songs' "gentle guitar." Josiah Hughes of Exclaim! gave the track a mixed review, Hughes praised Aiko's voice calling her vocals "great", however, Hughes described the song's musical style as "sleepy."

== Music video ==
On January 21, 2015, Aiko released a video for the song, the video premiered on ELLE and was inspired by Wes Anderson. During the video, Aiko takes on a variety of personas—from a hippy chick to a goth girl to a whip-wielding dominatrix. Her boyfriend, played by her real-life baby's father O'Ryan, tries everything to please her, but her wandering ways eventually cause him to leave.

== Promotion ==
During Aiko's performance in April at the 2014 Coachella Festival, she premiered a live rendition of "Spotless Mind". The performance included her band and a string quartet. On August 25, 2014, Aiko performed a stripped-down version of the song along with a performance of "To Love & Die" as part of MTV's unplugged artist to watch.

== Charts ==
Chart (2015)	Peak position
US Adult R&B Songs (Billboard)	24

== Certifications ==
Region	Certification	Certified units/sales
New Zealand (RMNZ)	Gold	15,000^{‡}
United States (RIAA)	Platinum	1,000,000^{‡}
^{‡} Sales+streaming figures based on certification alone.
