= To Love & Die =

Single by Jhené Aiko featuring Cocaine 80s

from the album Souled Out
- Released: June 24, 2014
- Genre: PBR&B
- Length: 3:23
- Label: Def Jam; Artium
- Songwriters: Jhené Aiko Chilombo; Mac Robinson; Brian Warfield; James Fauntleroy; Darrell Branch; Curtis Jackson; Frederick Perren; Luis Resto; Keni St. Lewis
- Producer: No I.D.

Jhené Aiko singles chronology
"The Worst" (2014)	"To Love & Die" (2014)	"The Pressure" (2014)

"To Love & Die" is a song by American singer Jhené Aiko from her debut studio album, Souled Out (2014). The song was released as the lead single from the album on June 24, 2014. In 2012, Aiko revealed that she would be working with Cocaine 80s and announcing they would feature on the album. The song was written by Aiko, alongside Mac Robinson, Brian Warfield and James Fauntleroy and interpolates 50 Cent's 2003 song "Many Men (Wish Death)". "To Love & Die" features Cocaine 80s, with fellow members James Fauntleroy providing vocals and No I.D. handling the production.

Backed by tripping drum loops and hypnotic, spacey synthesisers, "To Love & Die" is dark and melodic R&B and PBR&B song that lyrically revolves around love and contains confessional lyrics. Upon release "To Love & Die" was met with generally positive reviews from music critics; whom praised the song's production and Aiko's vocals. Commercially the song fared well charting at number forty six on the US Hot R&B/Hip-Hop Songs and number twenty on the US Top R&B Singles and made appearances on German and UK charts.

To promote the single Aiko released a video of her preparing to go on tour and rehearsals, and sang an acoustic rendition of the song. In August Aiko performed the song at Lollapalooza festival as part of her setlist and performed an acoustic rendition of the song for MTV's unplugged artist to watch.

== Background ==
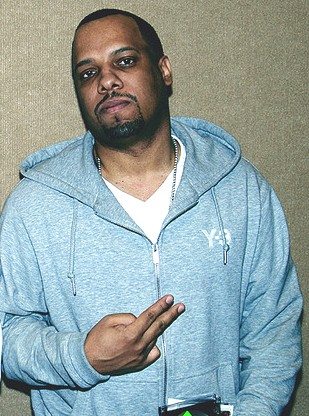
Ernest Wilson professionally known as No I.D., produced "To Love & Die."

In October 2012, after performing at SOB's in New York City, Aiko revealed to The Singers Room that she is recording a project with No I.D. and the rest of Cocaine 80s and that they would also be featured on her upcoming Def Jam debut, Souled Out: "Me and the Cocaine 80s is made up of musicians, singers and producers. I told them I wanted to be a part of the Cocaine 80s. I wanted to be the female voice of the group. They will be featured on ‘Souled Out’. Yes, we are definitely working on a mixtape or album together. That is definitely in the works.

The song was written by Aiko, alongside Mac Robinson, Brian Warfield and James Fauntleroy. Other writing credits also come from American rapper 50 Cent, Darrell "Digga" Branch, Luis Resto, Frederick Perren and Keni St. Lewis, due to their contribution to 50 Cent's 2003 song "Many Men (Wish Death)", which Aiko sampled. Following the release of Aiko's debut extended play Sail Out (2013), Aiko announced her debut studio album Souled Out would be released in May 2014. On 23 June 2014 Jhené Aiko posted the cover art and a snippet of the single on her official Instagram page, the single's artwork was described as "space-y" by Adelle Platon of Vibe magazine. The song was released for digital download on iTunes on the following day.

== Composition ==
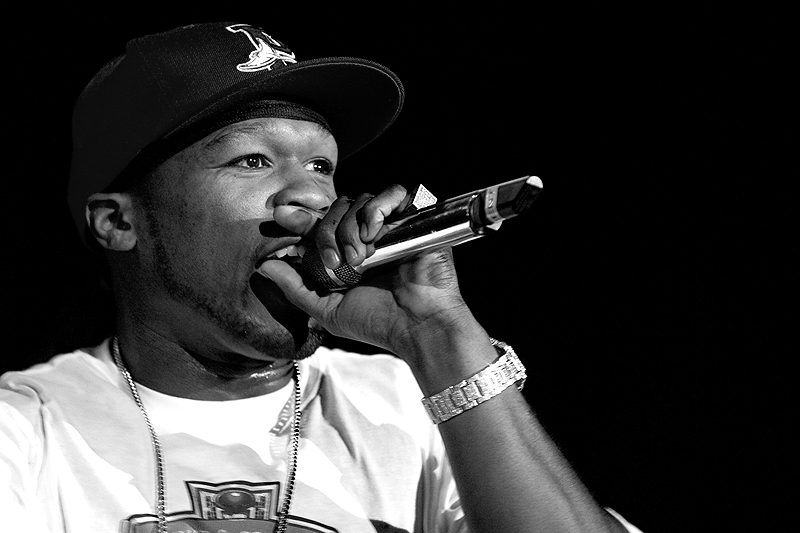
The song interpolates rapper 50 Cent's 2003 song "Many Men (Wish Death)".

"To Love & Die" is a contemporary R&B song with a length of three minutes and twenty-three seconds. The song is an "atmospheric" and "sparse" song with R&B "textures" and a psychedelic twist. Built over a "dark and melodic" production that contains "tripping drum loops and hypnotic, spacey synthesisers," the song also interpolates American rapper 50 Cent's 2003 cult classic song "Many Men (Wish Death)". Josiah Hughes of Canadian music magazine Exclaim!, noted the song's musical style as being "a hazy, slow-burning R&B jam" built around "breezy" music, "spaced-out vocals and sparse" production.

"To Love & Die" contains confessional lyrics. Lyrically the song revolves around love and affection; with the themes being introduced via lyrics including “‘Cause where I'm from we live by the love, die by the love,” and “I'm just a prisoner of your army of one/But I'll fight until the death, or until your heart is won.” Commenting on the song's lyrical content Bradley Stern of Idolator said the song's themes revolve around Aiko "falling head over heels in love, preparing to head into war to win herself some much-needed affection: “‘Cause where I'm from we live by the love, die by the love.”"

== Critical reception ==
Upon release "To Love & Die" was met with generally positive reviews from music critics. Bradley Stern of the online publication Idolator praised the song, commending the song's production calling it "exquisitely moody" and continued to praise Aiko for "sticking to her signature sound." Justin Davies on behalf of Complex magazine, praised Aiko's vocals on the song calling them "soft and sultry," continuing to praise how her vocals carry out the song's voice carries "swagger", "catchy rhyme scheme and an even more infectious chorus." Maurice Bobb of MTV praised Aiko's "command of her emotions" and noting Aiko's rap style on the song which Bobb described as "rhythmic swag."

Emily Tan of The Boombox, praised Aiko's change from lyrics that revolve around "bad relationships" to "happy love and devotion," Tann also praised the song's "fluid melody." A reviewer from The Source magazine, gave the song positive reviews and commended the single's "powerful lyrics", the reviewer also compared the song to the work of a "younger Sade". Josiah Hughes of Canadian music magazine Exclaim!, gave the song a mixed review praising the song's production, but felt the song "sinks" into the background, however Hughes also noted the song as a "grower."

== Live performances ==
On July 22, 2014 Aiko released a video of her preparing to go on tour and rehearsals, during the video she sang an acoustic rendition of the song along with her guitarist Jeff, during the video Aiko also performed “Stay Ready (What a Life)” and “The Worst.” On August 1, 2014 Aiko performed the song at Lollapalooza festival along with other songs including; "Higher", "Bed Peace" and "The Worst". On August 25, 2014 Aiko performed a stripped down version of the song along with a performance of Spotless Mind, Aiko performed the song as part of MTV's unplugged artist to watch.

== Track listing ==
Digital download

- To Love & Die (featuring Cocaine 80s) - 3:23

== Credits ==
Credits adapted from All Music.

- Jhené Aiko - Composer, Primary Artist
- Darrell Branch - Composer
- Jhené Chilombo - Composer
- Cocaine 80s - Featured Artist, Primary Artist
- James Fauntleroy - Composer
- Curtis Jackson - Composer
- Frederick Perrin - Composer
- Luis Resto - Composer
- Mac Robinson - Composer
- Keni St. Lewis - Composer
- Brian Warfield - Composer
- Ernest Dion Wilson - Production

== Charts ==
"To Love & Die" debuted at number forty-six on the US Billboard Hot R&B/Hip-Hop charts.

Chart (2014)	Peak position
Germany (Deutsche Black Charts)	18
UK Singles Chart	72
US Hot R&B/Hip-Hop Songs (Billboard)	46

== Release history ==
Country	Date	Format	Label
United States	June 24, 2014	Digital download	Island Def Jam Music Group
