= Kan Gao =

Video game developer (born 1988/89)

Kan R. Gao
- Born: 1988 (age 37–38)
- Other name: Reives
- Notable work: To the Moon

Kan "Reives" Gao is a video game developer, writer, director, and composer of Chinese-Canadian descent. He is the founder of Freebird Games, an independent studio known for its narrative-driven games built using the RPG Maker engine, notably his critical breakthrough project, To the Moon, becoming a flagship franchise.

== Early and personal life ==
Gao initially grew up in China and immigrated to Canada at the age of 11. The immigration process was challenging for his family, who worked long hours to make ends meet, resulting in Gao spending much of his time alone. During high school, Gao was an aspiring writer working on a novel. However, he discovered the RPG Maker engine, which allowed him to create interactive stories with visuals and audio. Gao taught himself to play the piano during high school lunch breaks, though he only began proper composition with game development.

On August 8, 2017, Kan Gao mentioned he was getting married in the upcoming month.

== Career ==
Before To the Moon, Gao created several free, narrative-focused games within the RPG Maker community, including Quintessence: The Blighted Venom and The Mirror Lied.

In 2008, Gao established the Canada-based Freebird Games as an independent studio to create interactive stories. Gao is the only employee of it, but he does receive assistance "via commissions from many talented folks who kindly contribute [...] and sometimes via bartering". Freebird Games later released To the Moon, which was its first commercial title; later becoming a flagship franchise, spawning three successors: A Bird Story, Finding Paradise, and Impostor Factory, among other minisodes. In 2018, it was made public that Gao was involved in the script and supervision for an upcoming animated film adaptation of To the Moon.

== Style and themes ==
Gao's approach to game development is unique, focusing on storytelling and emotional connections rather than complex gameplay mechanics primarily using the RPG Maker XP engine. He is known for his thoughtful and introspective approach to game design, often exploring themes of mortality, memory, and human connection. For example, the concept for Gao's renowned game, To the Moon, was inspired by a personal crisis involving his grandfather's illness. Contemplating his own mortality and the idea of reflecting on life with regrets, Gao created a game centered around human-centered themes and introspection.

== Gameography ==
Year	Title
2006	Quintessence - The Blighted Venom
2008	The Mirror Lied
2009	Lyra's Melody - The Song She Whispered to Me
2011	To the Moon
2014	A Bird Story
2017	Finding Paradise
2021	Impostor Factory
2024	Just a To the Moon Series Beach Episode
