= Post to Be =

Single by Omarion featuring Chris Brown and Jhené Aiko

from the album Sex Playlist
- Released: November 11, 2014
- Recorded: 2014
- Genre: Hip hop; R&B; hyphy
- Length: 3:47
- Label: Maybach Music; Atlantic
- Songwriters: Omarion Grandberry; Christopher Brown; Jhené Chilombo; Tyrone Griffin, Jr.; Dijon McFarlane
- Producer: DJ Mustard

Omarion singles chronology
"You Like It" (2014)	"Post to Be" (2014)	"I'm Up" (2015)

Chris Brown singles chronology
"Only" (2014)	"Post to Be" (2014)	"Waves" (Robin Schulz remix) (2014)

Jhené Aiko singles chronology
"The Pressure" (2014)	"Post to Be" (2014)	"Spotless Mind" (2014)

Music video
- "Post to Be" on YouTube

"Post to Be" is a song by American singer Omarion featuring fellow American singers Chris Brown and Jhené Aiko from the former's fourth studio album, Sex Playlist (2014). Each of the artists featured co-wrote the song alongside Ty Dolla $ign and producer DJ Mustard. The track was released as the album's second single on November 11, 2014. Musically, the song is a hip hop club track that is built over a clap-heavy West Coast production. The song contains a "bouncy" production and samples Chaka Demus & Pliers' 1993 song "Murder She Wrote". The word "post" is a sensational spelling of the word "supposed".

Commercially, the song peaked at number thirteen on the US Billboard Hot 100 and number five on the US Billboard Hot R&B/Hip-Hop Songs chart. The track also made appearances on charts in Canada, Belgium and the UK. The song was later certified platinum by the Recording Industry Association of America (RIAA).

An accompanying music video was filmed in Los Angeles and was co-directed by Omarion along with Jay Ahn and Taz. The video premiered on February 17, 2015, and depicts the three musicians dancing against an all-white backdrop.

== Background ==
Omarion sent the song to Aiko asking if she would make an appearance on the track; Aiko agreed due to her friendship with Omarion and began "playing with the rhyme scheme". While writing with longtime collaborator Micah Powell, the lyric "Post To Be" reminded Aiko of rapper Kevin Gates, and she told Powell; 'Whatever we say, I really want to say something about eating the booty.' He keeps saying in the Vines—'You 'posed to eat the booty.'" Prior to the release of the song, Omarion released snippets. The song was later leaked on November 11, 2014, by the LA Leakers. The song was released as the album's second single on November 11, 2014, through Maybach Music Group and Atlantic Records.

== Composition ==
"Post to Be" is composed in the key of D♭ major with a tempo of 97 beats per minute. The song follows a chord progression of B♭m–A♭–D♭–G♭.

== Music video ==
On January 22, 2015, Omarion revealed via his official Instagram account that he was filming the song's accompanying video in Los Angeles. Via the Instagram account Omarion posted photos of himself, Brown, and Aiko alongside a white Ferrari and standing onset by an all-white backdrop. Later on February 16, Omarion posted two clips of the video on Instagram along with a caption saying "It's coming.... #Posttobevideo", the clips depicting the three singers performing synchronized moves on an all-white set.

The video was co-directed by Omarion along with Jay Ahn and Taz, and was released the following day on February 17. The video featured Omarion moonwalking in front of a white Ferrari, accompanied by Brown dancing. Naomi Zeichner of The Fader praised the video comparing it to a home abs workout stating it "is four pure minutes of perfectly crisp mirror-dancing that doubles as a home abs workout." As of July 2025, the video has 903 million views.

== Remix ==
On May 8, 2015, an official remix of the song was released featuring new verses from DeJ Loaf, Trey Songz, Ty Dolla Sign and Rick Ross. Verses performed by Omarion, Brown, and Aiko were still present, though Aiko only had one line sampled into the final version.

== Credits ==
Credits adapted from AllMusic.

- Omarion – vocals, composer
- Jhené Aiko – vocals, composer
- Chris Brown – vocals, composer
- Tyrone Griffin – composer
- Samuel Sam Hook Jean – composer
- Dijon McFarlane – composer, producer
- Mikely Adam – composer
- Bobby Turner – composer

== Charts ==
=== Weekly charts ===
Chart (2015)	Peak position
Australia (ARIA)	79
Belgium (Ultratip Bubbling Under Flanders)	70
Belgium Urban (Ultratop Flanders)	31
Canada Hot 100 (Billboard)	49
Netherlands (Single Tip)	16
UK Singles (OCC)	74
UK Hip Hop/R&B (Official Charts)	11
US Billboard Hot 100	13
US Hot R&B/Hip-Hop Songs (Billboard)	5
US Dance Airplay (Billboard)	26
US Pop Airplay (Billboard)	20
US R&B/Hip-Hop Airplay (Billboard)	2
US Rhythmic Airplay (Billboard)	1

=== Year-end charts ===
Chart (2015)	Position
US Billboard Hot 100	24
US Hot R&B/Hip-Hop Songs (Billboard)	9
US Rhythmic (Billboard)	2

== Certifications ==
Region	Certification	Certified units/sales
Denmark (IFPI Danmark)	Gold	45,000^{‡}
New Zealand (RMNZ)	3× Platinum	90,000^{‡}
United Kingdom (BPI)	Platinum	600,000^{‡}
United States (RIAA)	6× Platinum	998,000
^{‡} Sales+streaming figures based on certification alone.

== Release history ==
Country	Date	Format	Label
United States	November 11, 2014	Digital download	Maybach Music; Atlantic

== See also ==
- List of Billboard Rhythmic number-one songs of the 2010s
- Anilingus
