= Finding Paradise =

2017 video game

- Header art
- Developer: Freebird Games
- Publisher: Freebird Games
- Writer: Kan Gao
- Composer: Kan Gao
- Engine: RPG Maker XP
- Platforms: Linux; macOS; Windows; Android; iOS; Nintendo Switch
- Release: December 14, 2017; November 18, 2022 (Mobile, Switch)
- Genres: Interactive story, Adventure, role-playing
- Mode: Single-player

Finding Paradise is an adventure game developed and published by Freebird Games. Serving as a sequel to To the Moon and A Bird Story, the story continues with doctors Eva Rosalene and Neil Watts as they help to fulfill a wish for Colin Reeds, who is now a bedridden old man. As with To the Moon, it features relatively few gameplay mechanics which center around puzzles, with the player controlling both doctors as they solve them in order to reconstruct the dying man's memories in order to fulfill his dying wish. The game was fully designed, written, and composed for by Canadian independent game designer Kan Gao using the RPG Maker XP game engine. Development of the game began in 2015, and it was released for Linux, macOS, and Windows on December 14, 2017. It was released for Android, iOS, and Nintendo Switch on November 18, 2022. A sequel to the series, Impostor Factory, was released in 2021.

== Gameplay ==
The gameplay of Finding Paradise is similar to that of the first game in the series, To the Moon, which was also built on the RPG Maker XP engine. Like the previous game, it functions like a typical RPG, but without an inventory system, party system, or battle system. As the game is mostly story-driven, most gameplay revolves around puzzle solving for Colin's memories. This is done by interpreting information and experiencing his emotions and feelings, as well as finding ways to get deeper into his memories to discover the truth of his wish.

As with To the Moon, the game centers around exploring Colin's memories to find significant objects and collect energy from them to strengthen the memory and connect to a more distant one, from his childhood to modern day. Occasionally, players take a break from the machine and explore his house and the surrounding area for certain clues.

== Plot ==
Sigmund Corp. uses a technology that can create artificial memories. Since these artificial memories conflict with the patient's real memories, the procedure is only legal to do on comatose patients without much time left to live. Thus, they offer this as a "wish fulfillment" service to people on their deathbeds.

Sigmund Corp. employees Dr. Eva Rosalene and Dr. Neil Watts are contracted with fulfilling the paradoxical dying wish of Colin Reeds: to change something, yet change nothing at all. The doctors insert themselves into an interactive compilation of his memories and traverse backwards through his life via 'mementos', items of great personal significance to Colin that act as a link between his various memories. For reasons not stated, for this case, Watts decides to use a memory machine that he has personally modified instead of one sanctioned by Sigmund. The machine makes errors in transcribing Colin's memories, resulting in various anomalies like lengthened hallways and trees that have been placed indoors.

While getting ready to traverse Colin's memories, the doctors realize that Watts had forgotten their paperwork at Sigmund HQ and request a colleague, Dr. Roxanne Winters, to scan the documents over. Winters searches Watt's office for the paperwork and notices Watt's sanctioned memory machine hidden behind a bookshelf. Suspicious, Winters decides to personally visit them to confront Watts under the guise of sending them the paperwork in person.

The doctors proceed with exploring Colin's memories while waiting for the paperwork to arrive. In Colin's senior years, the doctors learn of Colin's relatively happy life with his wife Sofia and son Asher, peppered only with minor regrets, such as his skywriting marriage proposal having multiple typos. Colin had fulfilled his childhood dream of becoming an airline pilot, learned to appreciate the cello, and even went on his dream vacation to Bora Bora with Sofia. Despite this, Colin feels he had not lived a fulfilling life, and is unhappy enough to go to Sigmund Corp. in order to get a second chance. This causes friction with his family, as Asher and especially Sofia feel offended that Colin would want to overwrite his memories with them. However, Colin had asked for Sigmund Corp. to change as little as possible regarding his family, thus making his wish difficult to carry out. Strangely, the doctors also repeatedly encounter a shadowy figure in many of his older memories that appears to be watching them. Furthermore, the doctors find themselves traveling through Colin's memories in a decaying orbit, bouncing between his youth and senior years until they are projected to end somewhere in Colin's adulthood, instead of the typical linear reverse-chronological order.

While observing Colin's childhood memories, the doctors learn that he frequently communicated with Faye, a girl living across his apartment. As an only child whose parents were rarely home due to working long hours, Colin was very lonely and had no luck making friends in school. Quiet but imaginative, Colin seldom talked to anybody other than Faye, whose personality was the polar opposite of his. Faye would be at Colin's side for nearly all of Colin's youth, but is strangely absent in all of his adult memories. Faye originally inspired Colin to become a pilot.

In his early adulthood, as Colin became acquainted with Sofia through their community orchestra, he and Faye began to drift apart. When the doctors witness this memory, they become convinced that Colin secretly regrets choosing Sofia over Faye, but his loyalty to his family prevents him from expressing his wish. While evaluating how to deal with the situation, Watts suggests that the only way to respect Colin's conditions is to erase Faye from his memories. As the doctors debate their solutions, Winters announces that she has arrived with the paperwork and her colleague, Dr. Robert Lin. Watts hastily exits Colin's memories to complete the paperwork. As he deals with the paperwork, Winters confronts Watts over his use of a personally modified machine. Watts is reluctant to elaborate but Winters is able to coerce him into explaining the situation to her at a later date. Winters also warns Watts that his modifications could potentially be dangerous to all parties using the machine. However, before Watts can return to Colin's memories, he experiences a wave of pain and briefly leaves Colin's home to retrieve his painkillers. Before leaving, Colin's bedside doctor notes to Watts that Colin's brain activity is unusually high for a comatose patient.

Rosalene, still investigating Colin's memories, requests Watts to run a record search on Faye and aviation accidents. Watts forwards the search to Winters and Lin, both of whom cannot find any trace of a person resembling Faye ever existing. Watts, perturbed, hurries back and re-enters Colin's memories, where Rosalene has now disappeared. As Watts searches for her, Faye violently confronts him.

Faye's true identity is that of an imaginary friend that a young Colin created by writing about her in a green book he kept with him his whole life. Because of the vivid detail Colin had written her with, Faye was able to manifest as an actual girl in his memories. As an extension of Colin's own mind, Faye had been observing the doctors throughout their investigation. When Faye overhears the doctors talking about erasing her, she exploits imperfections in Watts' modified machine to seize control. She locks Watts out of the memories, so he has to fight her in the machine while Rosalene, having escaped Faye earlier, administers sedatives to Colin in the real world. With Faye temporarily subdued, the doctors are then able to access the last memory: In Colin's early adulthood, he finally lets go of Faye and stops writing about her in his book. Before saying goodbye, Faye promises to come back one more time at the end of Colin's life to hear his stories. It is implied that Faye is Colin's interpretation of the bird from A Bird Story, as she is given wings and Colin refers to her as his first real friend, one whom he had said goodbye to a long time ago.

However, as a result of the efforts to weaken Faye, Colin's condition rapidly deteriorates, and the doctors no longer have the time to modify his memories without risking themselves. Watts comes to the conclusion that Colin's misery was induced by FOMO after learning of Sigmund's tech, which in turn caused him to be unable to face Faye. Watts then convinces Rosalene that they should give full control of the machine to Faye to create a fast solution for Colin's wish. The doctors leave, and Faye erases Sigmund Corp. from Colin's memories. This creates a life where Colin never asked for their services, leaving his life as is and allowing him to live out his last few years with his family without any animosity. In his final moments, Colin looks across the balcony as he did as a child, and Faye appears once more as promised. She asks if Colin still has regrets. Colin admits he still has plenty, but firmly states that he is happy with what his family and his life have given him. Satisfied, Faye bids farewell, and Colin thanks Faye for having always been there with him. Colin walks back inside and kisses a sleeping Sofia one last time before flatlining. In the real world, Watts gives Colin's green book to Sofia and unveils Colin's writings to her.

Later, Rosalene attends Colin's funeral. Back at HQ, Watts continues to work on his modified memory machine, with Winters and Lin now on board with his secret project. Watts explains his "solution" to them, and an image of Faye appears on Watts' computer terminal.

== Development and release ==
Finding Paradise was developed and published by Freebird Games for Linux, macOS, and Windows by the independent Canadian game designer Kan Gao. Created using the RPG Maker XP engine, the development started in 2015, a year after A Bird Story was released. Originally meant to be released in mid-2017, the game was delayed due to issues in Gao's personal life. The game was released on December 14, 2017.

== Reception ==
Reception

Aggregate score
Aggregator	Score
Metacritic	81/100

Review scores
Publication	Score
RPGFan	93%
App Trigger	8/10

Finding Paradise has received generally positive reception, with an 81/100 Metacritic score based on 18 critic reviews. Bob Richardson from RPGFan praised the game for its storytelling, soundtrack, and expressive pixel art.

=== Accolades ===
The game was nominated for the Off Broadway Award for Best Indie Game at the New York Game Awards 2019.
