= Minisode =

Minisode may refer to:

- Minisode1: Blue Hour, 2020
- Minisode2: Thursday's Child, 2022
- Minisode3: Tomorrow, 2024
