= A Bird Story =

2014 video game

- Game logo
- Developer: Freebird Games
- Publisher: Freebird Games
- Engine: RPG Maker
- Platforms: Linux, OS X, Windows
- Release: November 7, 2014
- Genres: Adventure, role-playing
- Mode: Single-player

A Bird Story is an adventure role-playing video game developed and published by Freebird Games. It was released in November 2014 for Linux, OS X, and Windows as a minisode connecting the previous game by Freebird Games, To the Moon, with its sequel, Finding Paradise.

== Gameplay ==
A Bird Story is a short video-game in which the player controls an imaginative young boy who is ignored by the majority of the other characters and throughout the whole game; all characters except the boy and a few others have ghost-like bodies. When the boy finds an injured bird, he becomes happier and begins to notice more people, and his introversion lowers. The map is as though the game is a recollection of memories, instead of being in real time. The player could be in a park which leads into a hallway. In a Kotaku review, the lack of dialogue was compared to the expression "show, don't tell".

== Plot ==
Though never stated in the game, the protagonist of the game is Colin. Colin is an only child, whose parents are almost never home due to working long hours away. His parents are never seen, communicating with Colin mostly through written notes, but still care deeply for him. Nevertheless, Colin is very lonely, as he has no friends and is frequently chided by his teacher for never paying attention in class. One day, Colin finds a bird with an injured wing being attacked by a badger. Colin chases off the badger. The bird later winds up hiding in Colin's backpack, and Colin eventually takes it to the vet. After the vet bandages up the broken wing, Colin sneaks the bird away while the vet is looking for a bird cage. Colin spends the next several days taking care of the bird on his balcony and playing with it in the woods, dodging both the vet and the landlord, who forbids pets within the apartment complex where Colin's family lives, to maintain custody over the bird.

As Colin's relationship with the bird deepens, Colin becomes less introverted and begins to connect more with his classmates. After several days, Colin becomes aware that his time with his bird is coming to an end. As he continues to play in the woods and hills with the bird, he daydreams of creating a massive paper plane using pages from his green book that he can summon at will. After a few fantasy flights, Colin returns home and takes off the bird's bandages. The bird, now fully recovered, flies off with a new mate. Though saddened, Colin is grateful to have had a friend for the first time. The experience would come to define Colin for the rest of his life, as depicted in Finding Paradise.

== Development and release ==
A Bird Story was developed by Freebird Games using the RPG Maker XP engine. It was ported to Linux and MacOS with the open source RPG Maker XP game engine recreation MKXP.

A Bird Story was primarily released as a connection between To the Moon and the proper sequel, Finding Paradise on November 7, 2014. It was the second minisode released between the publication of To the Moon and the development of Finding Paradise, which was released in December 2017. The player will control the same character in Finding Paradise as they did in A Bird Story, although Gao states that players do not need to play it to understand the sequel. The basic plot of the game is talked about in the sequel, as are mentions of To the Moon.

== Reception ==
Reception

Aggregate score
Aggregator	Score
Metacritic	66/100

A Bird Story received mixed reviews, with an overall 66/100 Metacritic rating based on 18 critic reviews. Many reviewers have compared this game to To the Moon, another game by Freebird Games. Andrew Barker, in a review for RPGFan said the game is an enjoyable experience but isn't for everyone; the game's pace moves slowly and even though it's an hour long, the memory of the game will linger. The lack of proper gameplay was criticised by many reviewers; in a Rock, Paper, Shotgun article, John Walker criticised the "incredibly slow" movement mechanics, in a Kotaku review by Cassidee Moser, the only listed con was the linearity of the gameplay and in a PC Gamer review by Tyler Wilde the game was described as dull and slow but sentimental nonetheless. The predictability of the storyline was also criticised by reviewers such as Christian Donlan from Eurogamer.
