= Orson Welles discography =

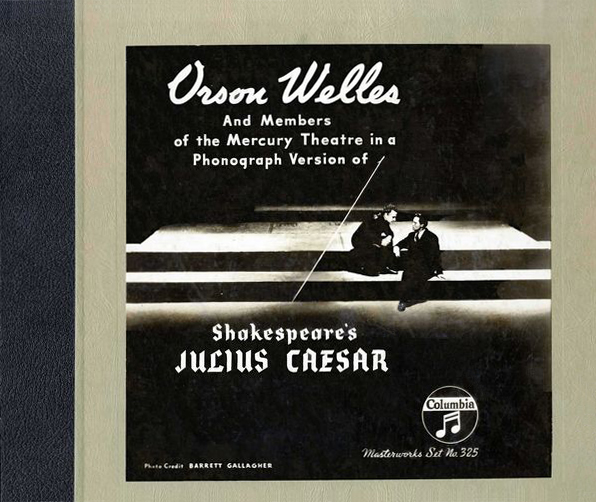
Mercury Theatre original cast recording for Caesar (Columbia Masterworks Records M-325, 1939)

This is a comprehensive list of all of the commercially released recordings made by Orson Welles. Welles is heard on many recordings that were not intended for commercial release and for which he was not compensated.

While every attempt has been made to provide a complete listing of Welles's commercial recordings in the order of their release, it would be folly to assume that such a list could ever be compiled with certainty.

— Miles Kreuger, 1985

== Drama ==
| Release date | Original recording date | Title | Format | Label | Notes |
|---|---|---|---|---|---|
| 1938 | April 1938 | The Cradle Will Rock | Seven 12" 78 rpm records | Musicraft Records (Musicraft 18) | Slightly abridged version of Welles's 1937 Mercury Theatre production with narration by Marc Blitzstein; First original cast recording ever made |
| 1939 | March 1, 11, 21 & 25, 1938 | The Tragedy of Julius Caesar | Five 12" 78 rpm records | Columbia Masterworks Records (M-325) | Highlights from the Mercury Theatre stage production featuring original cast members Incidental music by Marc Blitzstein; Cast: Orson Welles (Brutus), Joseph Holland (Caesar), George Coulouris (Marcus Antonius), Martin Gabel (Cassius), Hiram Sherman (Casca), John Hoystradt (Decius Brutus), John A. Willard (Trebonius, Volumnius); Released with Twelfth Night on Pearl CD in 1998 |
| 1939 | July 27, 28 & 29, August 23 & 25, September 7 & 14, 1938 | The Merchant of Venice | Twelve 12" 78 rpm records | Columbia Masterworks Records (C-6) | First of four releases in the Mercury Text Records series, phonographic recordings of William Shakespeare plays as adapted by Welles and Roger Hill in The Mercury Shakespeare; Music by Elliott Carter, singing by Adelyn Colla-Negri, guitar by Julius Wexler; Cast: Orson Welles (Narrator, Shylock, Prince of Morocco), Joseph Holland (Antonio), Eric Mansfield (Salarino), Norman Lloyd (Salanio, Launcelot Gobbo), Edgar Barrier (Bassanio, Prince of Arragon), Guy Kingsley (Lorenzo), Sidney Smith (Gratiano), Brenda Forbes (Portia), Sarah Burton (Nerissa), Erskine Sanford (Old Gobbo, The Duke), Virginia Welles (Jessica), George Duthie (Tubal), Richard Wilson (Salerio, Stephano), William Alland (Balthazar) |
| 1939 | June 14, 16 & 17, 1938 | Twelfth Night | Ten 12" 78 rpm records | Columbia Masterworks Records (C-7) | Mercury Text Records; Music by Marc Blitzstein; Cast: Orson Welles (Narrator, Malvolio), LeRoi Operti (Feste), George Coulouris (Orsino), William Alland (Curio), Richard Wilson (Calentine), Jane Gordon (Viola), John A. Willard (Sea Captain), Eustace Wyatt (Sir Toby Belch), Elizabeth Farrar (Maria), Will Geer (Sir Andrew Aguecheek), Phyllis Joyce (Olivia), Guy Kingsley (Sebastian), Erskine Sanford (Antonio), John Straub (Fabian), Edgerton Paul (Priest) |
| 1939 | June 28, 29 & 30, 1939 | Julius Caesar | Eleven 12" 78 rpm records | Columbia Masterworks Records (C-10) | Mercury Text Records; Music by Bernard Herrmann; Cast: Orson Welles (Narrator, Marcus Antonius, Caius Cassius), Edgar Barrier (Julius Caesar, Octavius Caesar), Walter Ash (M. AEmil Lepidus), John Berry, (Publius, Popilius Lena, Volumnius), George Coulouris (Marcus Brutus), Everett Sloane (Casca, Artemidorus), Guy Kingsley (Cinna the Conspirator, Lucius), Arthur Kennedy (Trebonius, Flavius, Titinius, Clitus), Erskine Sanford (Ligarius, Pindarus), Richard Baer (Decius Brutus, Cinna the Poet), Seymour Milbert (Metellus Cimber), William Alland (Marullus, Young Cato), Virginia Welles (Calpurnia), Margaret Curtis (Portia), Stephen Roberts (Lucilius, Messala) |
| 1940 | April 17, 18, 20, 23, 24 & 26, 1940 | Macbeth | Nine 12" 78 rpm records | Columbia Masterworks Records (C-33) | Mercury Text Records; Music by Bernard Herrmann; Cast: William Alland (Narrator, Donalbain), Orson Welles (Macbeth), Fay Bainter (Lady Macbeth), Robert Warrick (Banquo), Erskine Sanford (Duncan, The Porter, Siward, Seyton), George Coulouris (Macduff, Angus, The Doctor), Edith Barrett (Lady Macduff, Gentlewoman), Edgar Barrier (Malcolm), Sam Edwards (Fleance, Macduff's son), Richard Wilson (Lennox), Richard Baer (Ross, Young Siward), |
| 1945 | August 23, 1944 | The Song of Songs (Which Is Solomon's) | 12" 78 rpm record | Decca Records (29157) | Welles reads a fragmentary wedding idyll from the Bible |
| 1945 | August 31 & September 9, 1944; August 20, 1945 | In the American Tradition | Three 12" 78 rpm records | Decca Records (A-394) | Welles reads Thomas Jefferson's first inaugural address (March 4, 1801), Abraham Lincoln's second inaugural address (March 4, 1865), Woodrow Wilson's address to the Peace Conference in Paris (January 25, 1919), Franklin Delano Roosevelt's first war address before Congress (January 6, 1942) |
| 1946 | August 21, 1945 | The Happy Prince | Two 10" 78 rpm records | Decca Records (DA-420) | Welles's adaptation of the story by Oscar Wilde; Music by Bernard Herrmann, conducted by Victor Young; Cast: Orson Welles, Bing Crosby, Lurene Tuttle "It wasn't released for a year because neither of us would take first billing. In the end, they had to toss a coin just to get the thing out." (Orson Welles) |
| 1946 (April) | August 30 & 31, September 8, 9, 11 & 13, 1944, September 19, 1945 | No Man Is an Island | Five 12" 78 rpm records | Decca Records (A-439) | Welles reads a collection of immortal speeches on the interdependence of man Authors include John Brown, Lazare Carnot, John Donne, Patrick Henry, Abraham Lincoln, Pericles, Daniel Webster, Émile Zola |
| 1951 | | Abraham Lincoln | LP record | Decca Records (DL 8515) | Writings by and about Abraham Lincoln, read by Welles, Carl Sandburg, Walter Huston and Agnes Moorehead; Music by Lehman Engle and Victor Young |
| 1953 | June 1939 | Julius Caesar | Two LP records | Entree (EL 52) | Reissue of Columbia Masterworks Records C-10 |
| 1958 | August 1944–September 1945 | No Man Is an Island | LP Record | Decca Records (DL 9060) | Reissue of Decca Records A-439 |
| 1959 | | A Lincoln Treasury | LP record | Decca Records (DL 9065) | Reissue of material from Decca Records DL 8515; Includes The Lonesome Train, a drama in folk music form with Burl Ives, narrated by Earl Robinson |
| 1964 (December) | April 1938 | The Cradle Will Rock | LP record | American Legacy Records (T1001) | Limited-edition reissue of Musicraft Records 18 |
| 1967 | June 1939 | Julius Caesar | Two LP records | Lexington (LE 7570/7575) | Reissue of Columbia Masterworks Records C-10 |
| 1969 | 1969 | The Begatting of the President | LP record | Mediarts Records (41-2) | Satire of Richard M. Nixon written by Myron Roberts, Lincoln Haynes and Sasha Gilien, narrated by Welles |
| 1972 | 1969 | The Begatting of the President | LP record | United Artists (UAS-5521) | Reissue of Mediarts Records 41-2 |
| 1976 | | Great American Documents | LP record | Columbia Masterworks (USA 1776) | Readings by Welles, Henry Fonda, Helen Hayes and James Earl Jones; music by the New York Philharmonic conducted by Leonard Bernstein; Winner, Grammy Award for Best Spoken Word Recording |
| 1976 | October 18, 1966 | Blitzstein: The Airborne Symphony | LP record | Columbia Masterworks (M34136) | Commissioned in 1943 by the United States Army, officially dedicated to the Eighth Air Force; A history of human flight narrated by Welles, who performed the same role at the work's acclaimed premiere April 1, 1946; Leonard Bernstein conducting the New York Philharmonic; William Jonson conducting the Choral Art Society; Andrea Velis, tenor Recorded at Philharmonic Hall, Lincoln Center |
| 1979 | | The Gift of Christmas: Army of Stars | LP record | The Salvation Army (KM 4395) | Narration by Welles, music by the Roger Wagner Chorale and Sinfonia Orchestra |
| 1982 | 1982 | Battle Hymns | LP record | Liberty Records | Welles narrates the track "Dark Avenger" by Manowar. |
| 1983 | 1982 | "Defender" | LP record | Music for Nations | Welles narrates the single by Manowar. The song was remade in 1987 and the narration was reused and tweaked. |
| 1983 | | The Gift of Christmas: Army of Stars | LP record | The Salvation Army (KM 11576) | Music and readings by Welles, James Stewart, William Conrad, Greer Garson, Michael Landon, The Roger Wagner Chorale |
| 1984 | 1984 | I Know What It Is To Be Young | 7" single record | Max Records (43057) | Song by Jerry Abbott, lyrics read by Welles, music by The Ray Charles Singers and the Nick Perito Orchestra |
| 1984 | 1984 | I Know What It Is To Be Young | 12" single record | GNP Crescendo Records (GNPS 1206) | |
| 1984 | 1984 | I Know What It Is To Be Young | 7" single record | Indisc (DIS 7738) | |
| 1984 | 1984 | I Know What It Is To Be Young | 7" single record | Splash Records (SP 29) | |
| 1985 | 1984 | I Know What It Is To Be Young | 7" single record | GNP Crescendo Records (GNP 834S ) | |
| 1987 | 1982 | Fighting the World | CD | Atco Records | Welles narrates the track "Defender" by Manowar. The song is a remake of the single version that was released in 1983 and where the narration was used originally. |
| 1987 | 1976 | Tales of Mystery and Imagination | CD | Mercury Records | Welles narrates two tracks on the 1987 remixed version of The Alan Parsons Project album: specifically on "A Dream Within a Dream", and on the extended prelude of "The Fall of the House of Usher". |
| 1988 | 1984 | I Know What It Is To Be Young | 12" single record | Compagnia Generale del Disco (INT 15367) | |
| 1996 | 1984 | I Know What It Is To Be Young | Audiocassette; CD single | GNP Crescendo Records (GNPD 1407) | |
| 1998 | April 1938 | Marc Blitzstein: Musical Theatre Premières | Two CDs | Pearl (GEMS 0009) | Reissue of The Cradle Will Rock (Musicraft Records 18); Includes No for an Answer (1941), Dusty Sun (1946), The Airborne Symphony (1946, narrated by Robert Shaw) |
| 1998 | April 1940 | Macbeth | CD | Pearl (GEM 0011) | Reissue of Columbia Masterworks Records C-33 |
| 1998 | June 1938 & March 1938 | Twelfth Night and The Tragedy of Julius Caesar | Two CDs | Pearl (GEMS 0020) | Reissue of Columbia Masterworks Records C-7 and M-325; Includes Fun with Mr. Shakespeare: The Comedy of Errors (1947), narrated by Charles Coburn |
| 1998 | July–September 1938 | The Merchant of Venice | Two CDs | Pearl (GEMS 0029) | Reissue of Columbia Masterworks Records C-6; Includes excerpts of Macbeth by Maurice Evans and Judith Anderson (1941) |
| 1999 | June 1939 | Julius Caesar | Two CDs | Pearl (GEMS 0015) | Reissue of Columbia Masterworks Records C-10; Includes Maurice Evans performing four scenes from Richard II (1937) and the "England" speeches from Richard II and Henry V (1941) |
| 2000 | October 18, 1966 | American Masters 2: Bernstein Century | CD | Sony Classics (SMK 61849) | Includes remastered reissue of The Airborne Symphony from Columbia Masterworks M34136 |
| 2001 | 1944–45 | Dramatic Readings | CD | Pearl (GEM 0109) | Reissue of In the American Tradition (Decca Records A-394), No Man Is an Island (Decca Records A-439) and The Song of Songs (Decca Records 29157) |

== Radio ==
| Release date | Original recording date | Title | Format | Label | Notes |
|---|---|---|---|---|---|
| 1945 | January | The Suspect | 78 rpm record | Universal Pictures | Welles performs the lead role in this dramatization for radio broadcast, to promote release of the 1944 film noir starring Charles Laughton |
| 1945 | July 17, 1945 | The Liberation of Paris | Three 12" 78 rpm records | Asch Records (Asch 50) | Montage of historic recordings related to the World War II liberation of Paris in August 1944, with narration by Welles and Emlen Etting |
| 1950 | October 15, 1950 | This Is the U.N.: Its Actual Voices | 12" 78 rpm record | Tribune Productions (KI-2807) | Recordings of United Nations highlights, from the founding conference in San Francisco to the Korean debate, including remarks by Welles and many others |
| 1955 | October 30, 1938 | The War of the Worlds | LP record | Audio Rarities (LPA 2355) | Edited recording of The Mercury Theatre on the Air radio broadcast |
| 1968 | October 30, 1938 | The War of the Worlds | LP record | Longines Symphonette Society (4001) | Recording of The Mercury Theatre on the Air radio broadcast |
| 1968 | 1953 | Song of Myself | LP record | Westminster (WBBC-8004) | Recording of Welles's BBC presentation of the poem from Walt Whitman's Leaves of Grass |
| 1969 | October 30, 1938 | The War of the Worlds | Two LP records | Murray Hill records | Recording of The Mercury Theatre on the Air radio broadcast |
| 1969 | October 30, 1938 | The War of the Worlds | Two LP records | Evolution Records (4001) | Recording of The Mercury Theatre on the Air radio broadcast |
| 1972 | 1953 | Song of Myself | LP record | CMS Records (CMS-636) | Reissue of Westminster Records WBBC-8004, "in arrangement with BBC Radio Enterprises" |
| 1972 | 1937–38 | The Shadow | LP record | Mark 56 Records (591) | Recording of two unspecified original radio episodes Produced by George Garabedian as a promotional disc for Coca-Cola |
| 1972 | 1972 | Author's Roundtable | 10" single record | AirLines Transcription Disc | Collection of radio news features concludes with a spot for a history program narrated by Welles, "The Heritage of Eastern Cities" |
| 1972 | October 30, 1938 | The War of the Worlds | LP record | Longines Symphonette Society (SY 5251) | Recording of The Mercury Theatre on the Air radio broadcast |
| 1973 | September 2, 1942; April 10, 1945 | The Hitch-Hiker / The Master of Ballantrae | LP record | Pelican Records (107) | Recording of "The Hitch-Hiker" from Suspense, and the episode "The Master of Ballantrae" from This Is My Best |
| 1973 | 1938 | The Shadow / Fibber McGee and Molly | LP record | Mark 56 Records (636) | Includes recording of one unspecified episode of The Shadow starring Welles; Produced as a promotional disc for the Anaheim Savings and Loan Association |
| 1973 | May 29, 1938 | The Shadow / The Lone Ranger | LP record | Mark 56 Records (649, 773) | Includes recording of one radio episode starring Welles, "The Creeper"; Produced as a promotional disc for GE Lamps and for Carl's Jr. |
| 1973 | June 12, 1938 | The Shadow: Volume Two | LP record | Mark 56 Records (608) | Includes recording of one radio episode starring Welles, "Murder on Approval" |
| 1974 | September 25, 1938 | The Immortal Sherlock Holmes | LP record | Radiola Records (1036) | Recording of The Mercury Theatre on the Air radio broadcast |
| 1974 | March 17, 1940 | Huckleberry Finn | LP record | Mark 56 Records (634) | Recording of The Campbell Playhouse radio broadcast |
| 1974 | January 23 & 30, 1938 | The Shadow: Volume Three | LP record | Mark 56 Records (657) | Recording of two radio episodes starring Welles: "The Society of the Living Dead", "The Poison Death" |
| 1975 | March 17, 1940 | The Golden Days of Radio | Two LP records | Mark 56 Records (713) | Includes recording of The Campbell Playhouse episode "Huckleberry Finn" |
| 1975 | July 11, 1938 | The Great Radio Horror Shows | Three LP records | Murray Hill Records (933977) | Includes recording of The Mercury Theatre on the Air episode "Dracula" |
| 1976 | July 11, 1938 | Dracula | LP record | Mark 56 Records (720) | Recording of The Mercury Theatre on the Air radio broadcast |
| 1976 | March 27, April 24, May 1, 8, 29, June 12, 1938 | The Shadow | Three LP records | Murray Hill Records (894599) | Recording of six 1938 radio broadcasts starring Welles: "The White God", "Murder on Approval", "Aboard the Steamship Amazon", "The Creeper" "The Power of the Mind", "The Hypnotized Audience" |
| 1977 | June 5 & 19, 1938 | The Shadow | LP record | Golden Age Records (GA 5001); Everest 5001 | Recording of two 1938 radio broadcasts starring Welles: "The Tenor with the Broken Voice", "The Tomb of Terror" |
| 1978 | April 3 & 10, 1938 | The Shadow | LP record | Golden Age Records (GA 5029); Everest 5029 | Recording of two 1938 radio broadcasts starring Welles: "Death From the Deep", "The Firebug" |
| 1978 | July 18, 1938 | Treasure Island | LP record | Radiola (MR-1085) | Recording of The Mercury Theatre on the Air radio broadcast |
| 1978 | January 23 & 30, 1938 | The Shadow: Volume Four | LP record | Mark 56 Records (771) | Recording of two radio episodes starring Welles: "The Society of the Living Dead", "The Poison Death"; Customer gift from J. W. Harris Co., Inc. |
| 1978 | June 21, 1946 | Sorry, Wrong Number and The Hitch Hiker | LP record | Mark 56 Records (787) | Includes Welles's Suspense radio broadcast |
| 1979 | October 24, 31, 1937; January 9, 16, 23, 30, February 6, March 6 & 13, 1938 | More of The Shadow | Three LP records | Murray Hill Records (M 51212) | Recording of nine 1937–38 radio broadcasts starring Welles: "The Temple Bells of Neban", "The Three Ghosts", "The League of Terror", "Sabotage", "The Poison Death", "The Society of the Living Dead", "The Phantom Voice", "Bride of Death", "The Silent Avenger" |
| 1979 | June 2, 1939; April 17, 1945 | Orson Welles and Helen Hayes at Their Best | Two LP records | Mark 56 Records (829) | Includes recording of "Victoria Regina" (The Campbell Playhouse) and "I Will Not Go Back" (This Is My Best) |
| 1980 | April 17, May 15, 22, August 21 & 28, 1938 | The Shadow Anthology | Seventeen LP records | Murray Hill Records (S 55111) | Includes recordings of five 1938 radio episodes starring Welles: "The Blind Beggar Dies", "Murder in Wax", "The Message from the Hills", "Caverns of Death", "Death Under the Chapel"; Numbered limited edition collectors set |
| 1980 | December 24, 1939 | A Christmas Carol | LP record | Mark 56 Records (724) | Recording of The Campbell Playhouse radio broadcast Produced as a promotional disc for Nordstrom |
| 1980 | December 24, 1939 | A Christmas Carol | LP record | Radiola Records (MR-1114) | Recording of The Campbell Playhouse radio broadcast |
| 1980 | May 18 & 25, 1944 | Donovan's Brain | LP record | Radiola Records (MR-1117) | Recording of the Suspense radio broadcast Winner, Grammy Award for Best Spoken Word, Documentary or Drama Recording |
| 1980 | August 14, 1945; September 13, 1946 | Obediently Yours Orson Welles | LP record | Mark 56 Records (833) | Recording of radio broadcasts "Fourteen August" (Columbia Presents Corwin) and "King Lear" (The Mercury Summer Theatre of the Air) |
| 1982 | July 25, 1938 | Bette Orson Ingrid | LP record | Mark 56 Records (848) | Includes recording of The Mercury Theatre on the Air radio broadcast "A Tale of Two Cities" |
| 1983 | August 29, 1938 | The Count of Monte Cristo | LP record | Radiola Records (MR-1145) | Recording of The Mercury Theatre on the Air radio broadcast |
| 1985 | July 17, 1945 | The Liberation of Paris | LP record | Folkways Records (FH 5260) | Reissue of Asch Records 50 |
| 1988 | March 20, 1938 – June 21, 1946 | Theatre of the Imagination: Radio Stories by Orson Welles and The Mercury Theatre | LaserDisc (audio only) | Voyager Company (V1012L) | Quality collection of recordings produced by Frank Beacham and Richard Wilson from acetate records of the original radio broadcasts: The Shadow: "The White Legion"; The Mercury Theatre on the Air: "A Tale of Two Cities"; The Campbell Playhouse: "Rebecca"; Interview: "H. G. Wells meets Orson Welles"; The Orson Welles Show: "The Song of Solomon", "There's a Full Moon Tonight", "Noah Webster's Library" and poetry by Dorothy Parker, "Wilbur Brown, Habitat: Brooklyn","The Apple Tree", "My Little Boy"; Reading Out Loud: Welles reads and remarks on John Donne's "The Sun Rising" and "No Man Is an Island"; The Orson Welles Almanac: Soliloquy from Hamlet; This Is My Best: "Heart of Darkness"; The Mercury Summer Theatre of the Air: "The Hitch-Hiker"; Orson Welles Commentaries: "Doris Miller Tribute"; Theatre of the Imagination: The Mercury Company Remembers (1988), audio documentary written and produced by Frank Beacham and narrated by Leonard Maltin; participants include William Alland, Richard Barr, Geraldine Fitzgerald, Arlene Francis, John Houseman, Cliff Thorsness, Peggy Webber and Richard Wilson; also includes previously recorded interviews with Welles and Bernard Herrmann |
| 1988 | March 20, 1938 – June 21, 1946 | Theatre of the Imagination | Six audiocassettes | Voyager Company | |
| 1995 | July 23 – September 3, 1937 | Les Misérables | Three CDs | Radio Spirits, Inc. (ISBN 1570190658) | Produced in association with the Smithsonian Institution Press |
| 1995 | March 20, 1938 – June 21, 1946 | Theatre of the Imagination | CD-ROM | Voyager Company (CityROM CTHEATH) | Interactive disc for PC/Windows or Macintosh |
| 2003 | March 15 – July 12, 1944 | Kid Ory — Portrait of the Greatest Slideman Ever Born | CD | Upbeat Recordings URCD187 | Includes most of Orson Welles's introductions of the All Star Jazz Group performances on The Orson Welles Almanac |
| 2008 | June 21 & July 12, 1946, September 15, 1941 | Your Obedient Servant | CD | él Records (ACMEM140CD) | Recordings of The Mercury Summer Theatre of the Air radio broadcasts "The Hitch-Hiker" and "The Search for Henri Lefevre" by Lucille Fletcher, and The Orson Welles Show broadcast "Sredni Vashtar" by Saki |

== Film ==
| Release date | Original recording date | Title | Format | Label | Notes |
|---|---|---|---|---|---|
| 1959 | 1959 | Compulsion | 7" single record | 20th Fox Records (FEP-101) | Original motion picture soundtrack of courtroom scene |
| 1964 | 1964 | The Finest Hours | Two LP Records | Mercury Records (SRP 2–604) | Original motion picture soundtrack |
| 1967 | 1966 | A Man for All Seasons | Two LP Records | RCA Victor Records (VDM-116) | Original motion picture soundtrack |
| 1978 | 1941 | Citizen Kane | Two LP records | Mark 56 Records (810) | Complete motion picture soundtrack Winner, Grammy Award for Best Spoken Word Recording "This is not a new recording, but it includes the entire soundtrack — dialogue, sound effects, and music — just as it appears in the film. Though any soundtrack of a film is dependent on the visuals for narrative, the soundtrack of Citizen Kane succeeds by itself, no doubt because of Welles's and Herrmann's extensive background in producing radio dramas. … Garabadian's release of Citizen Kane's entire soundtrack (47 years after its premiere) is indicative of a changing trend in the release of music soundtracks. After record producers noticed that consumers would accept a compilation of excerpts as they appear in the film, there was less of a desire to record suites and other concert arrangements. Though suites are suitable for the concert hall, their contents reflect a necessary alteration of the original film score." (Robert Kosovsky) |
| 1979 | 1979 | The Late Great Planet Earth | LP record | RCR Productions (ACG-10022) | Original motion picture soundtrack |
| 1980 | 1967 | A King's Story | LP Record | DRG Records (SL 5185) | Original motion picture soundtrack |

== Interviews ==
| Release date | Original recording date | Title | Format | Label | Notes |
|---|---|---|---|---|---|
| 1979 | November 7, 1940 | Orson Welles Interviews H. G. Wells | LP record | Radiola Records (MR-1101) | Interview of Welles and Wells in San Antonio, Texas |
| 1992 | 1969–1975 | This is Orson Welles | Four audiocassettes | HarperAudio | Interviews with Peter Bogdanovich; Nominee, Grammy Award for Best Spoken Word or Non-Musical Album. |

== Scores ==
=== Citizen Kane ===
| Release date | Original recording date | Title | Format | Label | Notes |
|---|---|---|---|---|---|
| 1967 | June 1967 | Welles Raises Kane and The Devil and Daniel Webster | LP record | Pye Records (TPLS 13010) | Concert suite arrangements of film music cues written by Bernard Herrmann, who conducts the London Philharmonic Orchestra; Includes "Welles Raises Kane" (1943), subtitled "A Divertissement of the Gay Nineties": "Overture" (combines "Chronicle Scherzo", cue 46, and "Kane's Return", cue 50); "Variations" (from The Magnificent Ambersons); "Ragtime" ("Kane's New Office", cue 43); "Antimacassar" (from The Magnificent Ambersons); "Finale — Pursuit and Happiness" (combines "Galop", cue 39, and "Kane Marries", cues 65–69) |
| 1970 | February 1970 | Music from Great Film Classics | LP record | London Records (SP 44144); Decca Records (PFS 4213) | Includes the "Welles Raises Kane" suite, performed by the London Philharmonic Orchestra conducted by Bernard Herrmann |
| 1973 | June 1967 | Welles Raises Kane and The Devil and Daniel Webster | LP record | Unicorn Records (UNS 237) | Reissue of Pye Records TPLS 13010 |
| 1974 | June 11–13, 1974 | Citizen Kane: The Classic Film Scores of Bernard Herrmann | LP record | RCA Victor Records (ARL1-0707) | Performed by the National Philharmonic Orchestra conducted by Charles Gerhardt, with Kiri Te Kanawa, soprano Includes "Prelude: Xanadu; Snow Picture"; "Theme and Variations (Breakfast Montage)"; "Aria from Salammbô"; "Rosebud and Finale" |
| 1974 | June 11–13, 1974 | Citizen Kane: The Classic Film Scores of Bernard Herrmann | Audiocassette | RCA Victor Records | |
| 1974 | June 11–13, 1974 | Citizen Kane: The Classic Film Scores of Bernard Herrmann | CD | RCA Victor Records | |
| 1975 | | Citizen Kane: The Original Motion Picture Score | LP record | United Artists Records (UL-LA372-G) | Conducted by LeRoy Holmes; orchestration by Paul Swain, who transcribed much of the News on the March montage of various pieces of film music and re-orchestrated Herrmann's work to bring about an "easy-listening" recording of questionable merit |
| 1978 | 1941 | Citizen Kane | Two LP records | Mark 56 Records (810) | Complete motion picture soundtrack, including score, dialogue and sound effects; see detail in Film section |
| 1991 | 1991 | Citizen Kane: Original 1941 Motion Picture Score | CD | Preamble (PRCD 1788) | Performed by the Australian Philharmonic Orchestra conducted by Tony Bremner, with Rosamund Illing, soprano |
| 1993 | December 1–2, 1992 | Bernard Herrmann Film Scores: From Citizen Kane to Taxi Driver | CD | Milan Entertainment (Milan 7313835643–2) | Performed by the Royal Philharmonic Orchestra conducted by Elmer Bernstein; Includes "Citizen Kane Suite" — Prelude; The Inquirer (Polka); Finale; End Cast ("Oh Mr. Kane", arranged by Conrad Salinger) |
| 1994 | June 1967 | Welles Raises Kane / The Devil and Daniel Webster / Obsession | CD | Unicorn-Kanchana Records (UKCD 2065) | Includes reissue of Unicorn Records UNS 237 |
| 1999 | February 26, 1997; May 2, 1998; September 23, 1999 | Citizen Kane: Original Motion Picture Score | CD | Varèse Sarabande Records (VSD-5806) | Performed by the Royal Scottish National Orchestra conducted by Joel McNeely, with Janice Watson, soprano |
| 2006 | July 3, 1949 | Music from the Films of Orson Welles, Vol. 1 | CD | él Records (ACMEM68CD) | Includes the complete "Welles Raises Kane" suite, performed by the CBS Symphony Orchestra conducted by Herrmann and broadcast on CBS Radio |
| 2011 | June 11–13, 1974 | Citizen Kane: The Classic Film Scores of Bernard Herrmann | CD | RCA Victor Records | |

=== "The Hitch-Hiker" ===
| Release date | Original recording date | Title | Format | Label | Notes |
|---|---|---|---|---|---|
| 1983 | | Bernard Herrmann's Outer Space Suite | LP record | Cerberus Records (CST-0208) | Includes CBS Music Library recording of the score (7:14) for the original radio play "The Hitch-Hiker" by Lucille Fletcher, first broadcast November 17, 1941, on The Orson Welles Show; Hermann's score was subsequently used for Welles's presentations of the original radio play on Suspense (September 2, 1942), The Philip Morris Playhouse (October 16, 1942) and The Mercury Summer Theatre of the Air (June 21, 1946); The score has also been used on television programs including the 1960 adaptation "The Hitch-Hiker" for The Twilight Zone |

=== The Magnificent Ambersons ===
| Release date | Original recording date | Title | Format | Label | Notes |
|---|---|---|---|---|---|
| 1967 | June 1967 | Welles Raises Kane and The Devil and Daniel Webster | LP record | Pye Records (TPLS 13010) | Concert suite arrangements of film music cues written by Bernard Herrmann, who conducts the London Philharmonic Orchestra; Includes "Welles Raises Kane" (1943), subtitled "A Divertissement of the Gay Nineties": "Overture" (from Citizen Kane); "Variations" (the first cue from The Magnificent Ambersons); "Ragtime" (from Citizen Kane); "Antimacassar" ("First Letter Scene" from The Magnificent Ambersons); "Finale — Pursuit and Happiness" (from Citizen Kane) |
| 1970 | February 1970 | Music from Great Film Classics | LP record | London Records (SP 44144); Decca Records (PFS 4213) | Includes the "Welles Raises Kane" suite, performed by the London Philharmonic Orchestra conducted by Bernard Herrmann; Omits the fourth section, "Antimacassar", and misidentifies the work as simply "music from Citizen Kane |
| 1973 | June 1967 | Welles Raises Kane and The Devil and Daniel Webster | LP record | Unicorn Records (UNS 237) | Reissue of Pye Records TPLS 13010 |
| 1990 | 1990 | The Magnificent Ambersons: Original 1942 Motion Picture Score | CD | Preamble (PRCD 1783) | Performed by the Australian Philharmonic Orchestra conducted by Tony Bremner; Recording based on composer Bernard Herrmann's original full score, more than half of which was removed from the soundtrack when The Magnificent Ambersons was heavily edited by RKO; Herrmann threatened legal action and refused to be credited |
| 2006 | July 3, 1949 | Music from the Films of Orson Welles, Vol. 1 | CD | él Records (ACMEM68CD) | Includes the complete "Welles Raises Kane" suite, performed by the CBS Symphony Orchestra conducted by Herrmann and broadcast on CBS Radio |

=== Macbeth ===
| Release date | Original recording date | Title | Format | Label | Notes |
|---|---|---|---|---|---|
| 1990 | 1989 | Macbeth/Golgotha/Don Quichotte | CD | Marco Polo Records (8.223287) | Includes music from Macbeth by Jacques Ibert, performed by the Slovak Radio Symphony Orchestra conducted by Adriano |
| 2005 | 1989 | Film Music Classics: Macbeth/Golgotha/Don Quichotte | CD | Naxos Records (8.557607) | Reissue of Marco Polo 8.223287 |

=== Othello ===
| Release date | Original recording date | Title | Format | Label | Notes |
|---|---|---|---|---|---|
| 1993 | 1992 | Orson Welles' Othello | CD | Varèse Sarabande Records (VSD-5420) | "A labor of love" (Roger Ebert); Score from the 1992 restoration of Othello; Music from Angelo Francesco Lavagnino's original score as annotated by conductor Michael Pendowski, performed by members of the Chicago Symphony Orchestra and the Chicago Lyric Opera "A highly subjective reworking of some of the original materials, a postmodernist dream inspired by the original Othello sound track" (Jonathan Rosenbaum) |

=== Touch of Evil ===
| Release date | Original recording date | Title | Format | Label | Notes |
|---|---|---|---|---|---|
| 1958 | 1958 | Touch of Evil: Music from the Sound Track | LP record | Challenge Records (CHL-602) | Music from the soundtrack of Touch of Evil, composed by Henry Mancini, performed by the Universal-International Orchestra conducted by Joseph Gershenson |
| 1980 | 1958 | Touch of Evil: Original Motion Picture Soundtrack | LP record | Citadel Records (CT 7016) | Reissue with six additional tracks |
| 1993 | 1958 | Touch of Evil: Original Motion Picture Soundtrack | CD | Varèse Sarabande Records (VSD-5414) | Reissue with one more additional track |

=== Chimes at Midnight ===
| Release date | Original recording date | Title | Format | Label | Notes |
|---|---|---|---|---|---|
| 1966 | 1965 | Chimes at Midnight | LP Record | Fontana Records (TL 5417) | Original soundtrack recording from Chimes at Midnight, music by Angelo Francesco Lavagnino, conducted by Pier Luigi Urbini |
| 1993 | 1965 | Falstaff | CD | CAM (CSE 098) | Original soundtrack remastered |
| 2003 | 1965 | Falstaff | CD | CAM (CAM 4932032) | Reissue |
