= Chimes at Midnight (disambiguation) =

Chimes at Midnight is a film by Orson Welles.

Chimes at Midnight may also refer to:

== Music ==
- Chimes at Midnight, an original soundtrack recording from the film; see Orson Welles discography
- "The Chimes at Midnight", a song from the 2013 album Conversations with Ghosts by Paul Kelly
- "Chimes at Midnight", a single from the 2014 album Once More 'Round the Sun by Mastodon

== Other ==
- "We have heard the chimes at midnight" is an often quoted line from Henry IV, Part 2 by William Shakespeare.
- Chimes at Midnight, a 2013 novel by Seanan McGuire, part of the October Daye series
- "The Chimes at Midnight", a 2008 episode of the television series Brotherhood; see List of Brotherhood episodes

== See also ==
- "The Chimes of Midnight", a 2002 episode of the audio drama series Doctor Who: The Monthly Adventures
