= Inglorious Basterd =

Mixtape by Logic
- Released: September 18, 2023
- Recorded: 2011–23
- Genre: Hip-hop
- Length: 52:04
- Label: Self-released
- Producers: 40; 6ix; Bangladesh; Boi-1da; Cardo; Cha Lo; DJ Paul; DK the Drummer; Easy Mo Bee; Ging; Havoc; J. Cole; Juicy J; Kanye West; Like; Logic; Madlib; Mike Dean; Mike Zombie; Noah Goldstein; Pete Rock; Sevn Thomas; Soundtrakk; Sounwave; Willie B

Logic chronology
3P (with C Dot Castro) (2023)	Inglorious Basterd (2023)	Ultra 85 (2024)

Inglorious Basterd is the eighth mixtape by American rapper Logic. Initially released as an exclusive to his own fan server on Discord, it was released on his Bandcamp and YouTube channel on September 18, 2023, as his first independent mixtape in 10 years, since Young Sinatra: Welcome to Forever. The mixtape is based on demos and tracks of Logic rapping over other artists' previously released beats, hence is free for listening and downloading due to a lack of sample clearances for official streaming. The title is taken from the 2009 film Inglourious Basterds.

== Production ==
In the span of 2011 and 2023, Logic recorded numerous unreleased songs, either with the production from 6ix or the use of instrumentals from other hip-hop songs including Kendrick Lamar's "Rigamortus" and "HiiiPower", Drake's "Started from the Bottom, Kanye West's "Real Friends", and Lil Wayne's "A Milli".

== Release ==
On August 16, Logic announced on Instagram that he "would have new music out soon." The caption of the post says, "Here is the album artwork for my free mixtape "Inglorious Basterd" coming soon!! I just dropped the intro song called "Still Pushin" over Lupe Fiasco's classic "Kick, Push" for free for everyone on Discord!! Join and enjoy!! #RattPack."

Inglorious Basterd released on September 18, 2023, to Bandcamp and YouTube only as the samples are uncleared.

== Track listing ==
Inglorious Basterd track listing
No.	Title	Writer(s)	Producer	Length
1.	"Still Pushin 08.07.2023 v5"	Robert Hall; Wasalu Jaco	Soundtrakk	3:07
2.	"Free Music (Unmastered)"	Hall; Dwayne Carter; Shondrae Crawford; Kamaal Fareed; Ali Shaheed Muhammad; Kendrick Duckworth; Eric Reed	Sounwave; Willie B; Bangladesh; Cha Lo	2:09
3.	"Started (2019 demo)"	Hall; Aubrey Graham; Noah Shebib; Michael Coleman; James Brown	Mike Zombie; 40; Logic	1:36
4.	"I Choose You"	Hall; Paul Beauregard; Jordan Houston	Juicy J; DJ Paul	3:29
5.	"POWER 08.07.2023 v3"	Hall; Lamar; Herbert Stevens; Jermaine Cole	J. Cole	2:25
6.	"rendezvous"	Hall; Peter Phillips; Corey Penn	Pete Rock	3:09
7.	"Mystery Door 105.7 (Skit)"	Hall	Logic	2:48
8.	"Smooth Operator_Ref 06.06.19"	Hall; Arjun Ivatury; Ivatury; Matthew Crabtree; Steve Wyreman; Khalil Abdul-Rahman; William Harris; Gene Puerling	6ix; Logic	4:58
9.	"Dark Place (Demo)"	Hall; Kanye West; Mike Dean; Adam Feeney; Tyrone Griffin Jr.; Jalil Hutchens; Darren King; Kejuan Muchita; Glenda Proby; Matthew Samuels; Lawrence Smith; Cydel Young; Rupert Thomas Jr.; George Clinton; Gary Shider; Bernie Worrell	Kanye West; Boi-1da; Ging; Havoc; Sevn Thomas; DK the Drummer; Noah Goldstein; Mike Dean; Logic	3:26
10.	"Starfield"	Hall; Ivatury; Chazwick Bundick; Keanu Torres; Fabio Aguilar; Kamaal Fareed; Malik Taylor; Ali Shaheed Jones-Muhammad	6ix	3:07
11.	"Glamorous_Ref 06.25.19 v2"	Hall	Like	3:11
12.	"WillIt_Ref 11.01.18"	Hall; Cordae Brooks; Christopher Wood	6ix	1:36
13.	"Raiders of the Lost Art (Madlib's Mix)"	Hall; Madlib	Madlib	2:32
14.	"A Message from My Younger Self (06.16.2011)"	Hall	Hall	2:58
15.	"Tired in Malibu 02.01.2021 REF"	Hall; Trevor Smith; Osten Harvey, Jr.	Easy Mo Bee	1:00
16.	"Super High Freestyle 08.07.2023 2"	Hall; Cameron Thomaz	Cardo Got Wings	1:55
17.	"Feelin' My Self_Ref 06.08.19"	Hall	6ix	2:26
18.	"2am on Tour (2018)"	Hall	6ix	3:31
19.	"Get High V3 (02.28.2015)"	Hall; Talib Kweli; West; Nina Simone	Kanye West	5:44
20.	"Griptape (feat. John Lindahl)"	Hall; John Lindahl	6ix	5:01
Total length:				52:04

=== Samples ===
- "Still Pushin 08.07.2023 v5" samples "Kick, Push" by Lupe Fiasco
- "Free Music (Unmastered)" samples "A Milli by Lil Wayne and "Rigamortis" by Kendrick Lamar
- "Started (2019 demo)" samples "Started from the Bottom" by Drake and "Funky Drummer" by James Brown
- "I Choose You" samples "Choose U" by Project Pat
- "POWER 08.07.2023 v3" samples "HiiiPoWeR" by Kendrick Lamar
- "rendezvous" samples "They Reminisce Over You (T.R.O.Y.)" by Pete Rock & CL Smooth
- "Smooth Operator_Ref 06.06.19" samples "Soul Food II" by Logic and "OCD" by Logic & Dwn2earth
- "Dark Place (Demo)" samples "Real Friends" by Kanye West and "Do That Stuff" by Parliament
- "Starfield" samples "5 Hooks" and "See You Space Cowboy..." by Logic
- "WillIt_Ref 11.01.18" samples "Where Did the Love Go" by Cordae featuring Brent Faiyaz and Logic
- "Raiders of the Lost Art (Madlib's Mix)" samples "The Plan, Pt. 1" by Madlib
- "Tired in Malibu 02.01.2021 REF" samples "Everything Remains Raw" by Busta Rhymes
- "Super High Freestyle 08.07.2023 2" samples "Mezmorized" by Wiz Khalifa
- "Feelin' My Self_Ref 06.08.19" samples "Ultra Violent" by Logic
- "Get High V3 (02.28.2015)" samples "Get By" by Talib Kweli
