= The Mercury Summer Theatre of the Air =

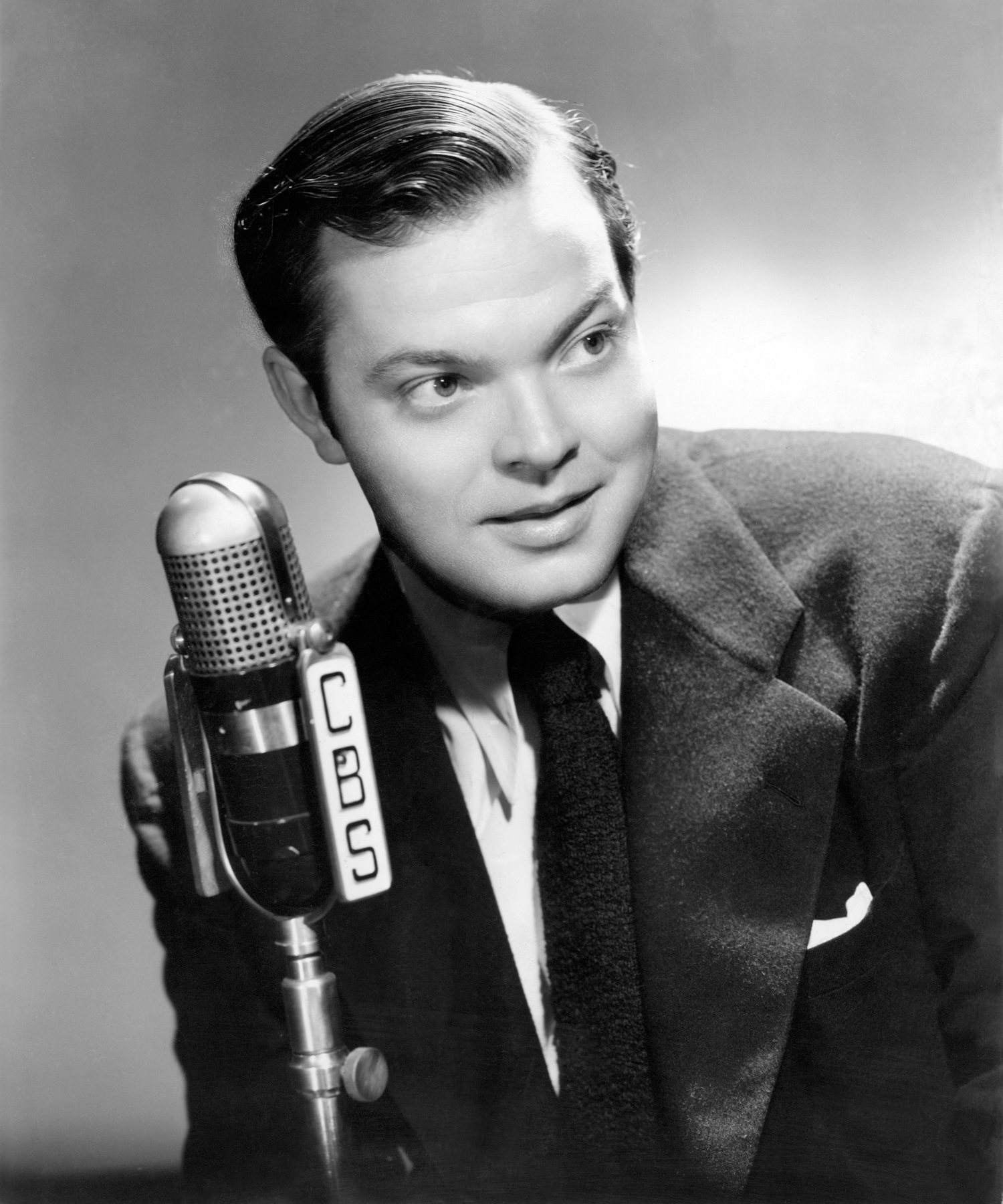
- Genre: Anthology drama
- Running time: 30 minutes
- Country of origin: United States
- Language(s): English
- Home station: CBS
- Hosted by: Orson Welles
- Starring: Various
- Written by: Orson Welles; Others
- Directed by: Orson Welles
- Produced by: Orson Welles
- Narrated by: Orson Welles
- Recording studio: New York
- Original release: June 7 – September 13, 1946
- No. of series: 1
- No. of episodes: 15
- Audio format: Monaural sound

The Mercury Summer Theatre of the Air (1946) is a CBS radio drama series produced, directed by and starring Orson Welles. It was a short-lived summer radio series sponsored by Pabst Blue Ribbon, on Friday evenings at 10 p.m. ET lasting 15 episodes. It harked back to Welles's earlier The Mercury Theatre on the Air (1938) and its successor, The Campbell Playhouse, but was not able to replicate its success. The series offered 30-minute adaptations of classic plays and novels, plus some adaptations of popular motion pictures, whereas the original had offered more depth in its 60-minute running time. Although the Mercury Theatre troupe had disbanded when Welles was fired from RKO studios in 1942 and the Mercury players were dismissed with him, this radio series offered a reunion of many Mercury personnel, including Richard Wilson (who would direct the rehearsals) and composer Bernard Herrmann, as well as familiar actors such as Agnes Moorehead and William Alland.

== Wider significance ==
The first episode is of particular note. At the time, Welles was directing Around the World on Broadway, a critically acclaimed musical based on Around the World in Eighty Days, which was praised by Bertolt Brecht as being the greatest night at the theatre he had ever experienced. Nonetheless, the expensive production flopped, and in a bid to give it publicity, Welles broadcast a half-hour condensation of the musical. The episode was the only recording ever made of any part of the musical or its Cole Porter score.

Welles had created, directed and starred in a string of radio drama series since 1937, and The Mercury Summer Theatre of the Air in 1946 ended up being his last. He moved to Europe in the fall of 1947, and his later radio work was made in Britain, most notably The Adventures of Harry Lime (1951–52). By the time Welles moved back to the US in 1956–58, and again more permanently in the 1970s, radio was no longer the dominant force it had been in the 1930s and 1940s.

As with many other Old Time Radio series from the period, the episodes have now lapsed into the public domain.

== Episodes ==
#	Date	Program
1	June 7, 1946	"Around the World in Eighty Days" by Jules Verne, based on the musical Welles was then directing on Broadway. Music by Cole Porter, lyrics by Noël Coward; Cast: Orson Welles (Fix), Arthur Margetson (Phileas Fogg), Larry Laurence (Passepartout), Mary Healy (Princess Aouda), Julie Warren (Molly Muggins)
2	June 14, 1946	"The Count of Monte Cristo" by Alexandre Dumas; Cast: Orson Welles (Edmond Dantès), Julie Warren (Mercédès); with Stefan Schnabel, Guy Spaull, Brainerd Duffield
3	June 21, 1946	"The Hitch-Hiker" by Lucille Fletcher; Cast: Orson Welles, Alice Frost
4	June 28, 1946	"Jane Eyre" by Charlotte Brontë; Cast: Orson Welles (Rochester), Alice Frost (Jane Eyre), Guy Spaull, Stefan Schnabel, Mary Healy, Abby Lewis
5	July 5, 1946	"A Passenger to Bali" by Ellis St. Joseph
6	July 12, 1946	"The Search for Henri Le Fevre" by Lucille Fletcher; Cast: Orson Welles, Mercedes McCambridge, Julie Warren, Brainerd Duffield
7	July 19, 1946	"Life With Adam" by Hugh Kemp; Host: Orson Welles, presenting a comic radio play originally produced for Stage 46 in Toronto by Andrew Allen. Cast: Fletcher Markle (Adam Barneycastle), Grace Mathews (Eve), John Drainie (Chester), Betty Garde (Jenkins), Hedley Rainie (Waiter, Producer, others); with Patricia Loudry, Mercedes McCambridge
8	July 26, 1946	"The Moat Farm Murder" by Norman Corwin; Cast: Orson Welles (Dougal), Mercedes McCambridge (Cecile)
9	August 2, 1946	"The Golden Honeymoon" by Ring Lardner; Cast: Julie Warren, Brainerd Duffield, Mercedes McCambridge, Mary Healy, Ted Osborne, Stefan Schnabel, Santos Ortega; Excerpts from Romeo and Juliet read by Orson Welles
10	August 9, 1946	"Hell on Ice" by Edward Ellsberg; Cast: Orson Welles, John Brown, Elliott Reid, Byron Kane, Norman Field, Earle Ross, Lurene Tuttle
11	August 16, 1946	"Abednego the Slave" by Orson Welles and John Tucker Battle; Cast: Orson Welles, Norman Field, Earle Ross, Joe Granby, Barbara Jean Wong, Carl Frank, Byron Kane, John Brown, William Johnstone, Elliott Reid, William Alland
12	August 23, 1946	"I'm a Fool" by Sherwood Anderson and "The Tell-Tale Heart" by Edgar Allan Poe; Cast: Orson Welles, William Alland, Joe Granby, Elliott Reid, Norman Field, Carl Frank, others
13	August 30, 1946	"Moby Dick" by Herman Melville; Cast: Orson Welles (Ahab), William Alland, Byron Kane, John Brown, Earle Ross, Elliott Reid
14	September 6, 1946	"The Apple Tree" by John Galsworthy; Cast: Orson Welles, Norman Field, Mary Lansing, Lurene Tuttle, Jerry Farber, others
15	September 13, 1946	"King Lear" by William Shakespeare; Cast: Orson Welles (King Lear), John Brown (Narrator); with Agnes Moorehead, Edgar Barrier, William Alland, Mary Lansing "Cynara", a poem by Ernest Dawson, read by Welles to conclude the Mercury Summer Theatre series

== See also ==
- Orson Welles radio credits
- Mercury Theatre
- The Mercury Theatre on the Air
- Campbell Playhouse
