= Morag Beaton =

Scottish-Australian soprano (1926–2010)

- Morag Beaton as Turandot 1967
- Born: Morag Beaton; 2 July 1926; Edinburgh, Scotland
- Died: 1 April 2010 (aged 83); Sydney, Australia
- Occupation: Opera singer
- Years active: 1962–1983

Morag Beaton (2 July 1926 – 1 April 2010) was a Scottish-Australian dramatic soprano who established her reputation as Turandot, a role she sang in Australia more than any other soprano to date. She also sang Tatiana (Eugene Onegin), Venus (Tannhäuser), Abigaille (Nabucco), Eboli (Don Carlos) Santuzza (Cavalleria rusticana) and many other roles. Her operatic career in Australia was relatively brief, lasting only from 1965 until 1983, with a final recital at the Sydney Opera House in 1983.

== Background ==
Today, Beaton's reputation rests largely on her appearances as Turandot (recorded in live performance and now on compact disc), and her performance as Cathy on the complete recording of Bernard Herrmann's only full-length opera Wuthering Heights. Beaton's operatic career is also notable because she is the only singer in history successfully to have alternated the exacting soprano role of Turandot with the contralto role of Maddalena (Rigoletto) in one season, and, in later seasons, sung the contralto role of Ulrica (A Masked Ball) followed by more Turandots and another difficult soprano role – Abigaille in Nabucco.

After Beaton's final recital at the Sydney Opera House in 1983, she occasionally sang for special events such as the 80th birthday gala for Sylvia Fisher, and mentored many aspiring singers. The warm reception for Beaton at the Sydney Opera House in 1996, when she attended the gala to mark the fiftieth anniversary of the Australian Opera Company, was as much an acknowledgement of her past performances as it was a reminder of how much audiences had missed her on stage in the intervening years. In 2006, at a gala for one hundred guests in honour of Beaton's own 80th birthday, she sang two Scottish songs, accompanied by Geoffrey Tozer. "Still rich and glorious" declared the guest of honour, the renowned Australian opera star Lauris Elms, when she heard Beaton's singing on that occasion.

== Early life ==
Beaton was born in Edinburgh, Scotland, on 2 July 1926. As a girl, Beaton studied music with her mother, Margaret. Feeling the need to contribute to the war effort, Beaton enlisted in the army in 1945 and devoted the next three years of her life to military service, singing as much as she could. Whenever the opportunity arose, Beaton would sing for the troops while fulfilling a variety of duties on different postings.

== Training ==
In Edinburgh after World War II, Beaton studied singing initially with a renowned teacher, Joyce Fleming. At Fleming's suggestion, Beaton also began to attend the Collegium Musicum sessions of Dr Hans Gál which were a "unique feature of Edinburgh's musical life". Gál became an important influence in Beaton's development. He was a brilliant musician, a composer, pianist and scholar of great distinction. In March 1938, like other Jewish refugee families anxious to escape Hitler and the Nazis, Gál fled to England with his wife Hanna and their two sons. Later Gál was offered a position as lecturer in Music at the University of Edinburgh.

In 1948, just as Beaton's prospects were moving in a positive direction, her life changed. Quite suddenly, in April, her mother died at the age of fifty. From then, until 1962, with the help of her aunt Barbara McGillivray, Beaton served a very long apprenticeship in singing in London. During the late 1950s she won a series of scholarships and prizes that enabled her, at last, to study singing full-time.

== Career ==
In 1962, she made her debut in Berlin singing in Manuel de Falla's Atlantida. After singing in Germany and England, having been invited by Richard Bonynge, she toured Australia with the Sutherland-Williamson International Grand Opera Company in 1965. In 1966, she recorded the role of Cathy in the complete recording of Bernard Herrmann's Wuthering Heights, under the composer's direction. The same year, she made another recording, this time for Decca, with Joan Sutherland and another singer she also admired, the mezzo-soprano Margreta Elkins. Beaton sang with the Australian Opera from 1967 until early 1973, when she resigned and returned to London where she underwent surgery for a medical condition that had been troubling her for some time. She returned to Australia in 1976.

On 16 January 1983, at the Sydney Opera House, Beaton returned to public performance with a recital of operatic arias including "Voi lo sapete" (Cavalleria rusticana) "Son pochi fiori" (L'amico Fritz), "O mio babbino caro" (Gianni Schicchi), "Io son l'umile" (Adriana Lecouvreur), "L'altre notte" (Mefistofele) and "Suicidio" (La Gioconda). With Elizabeth Allen she sang the duets "Songs My Mother Taught Me" (Dvořák) and the "Barcarolle" from Offenbach's The Tales of Hoffmann. In three beautiful unaccompanied Hebridean songs with which she closed the recital, Beaton sang a homage to her late Aunt Barbara and in remembrance of her mother, Margaret.

Dr Peter Wyllie Johnston, the Australian writer and composer, said that although Beaton lacked the support systems that are typically required for an operatic soprano, she made up for this by her strong character and resilience, and the focus of opera as her whole life.

=== Turandot ===
On 22 July 1967 Beaton sang her first Turandot to open the season at Her Majesty's Theatre in Melbourne. Between 1967 and 1971 Beaton sang Turandot in the Australian Opera's production, touring capital cities around the country. A live recording of one of those performances from Sydney is available. Critics such as Felix Werder, James Glennon, Val Vallis, John Cargher and Kenneth Hince among many others described Beaton's large and dramatic instrument impressing audiences, all the while resplendent in a padded costume with bespoke headdress and a twenty-eight foot peacock train.

== Retirement ==
In retirement in Sydney, Beaton was for many years a frequent guest of Opera Australia for performances at the Sydney Opera House. She died in Sydney on 1 April 2010, aged 83.
