= The Hitch-Hiker (The Twilight Zone) =

- The Twilight Zone episode
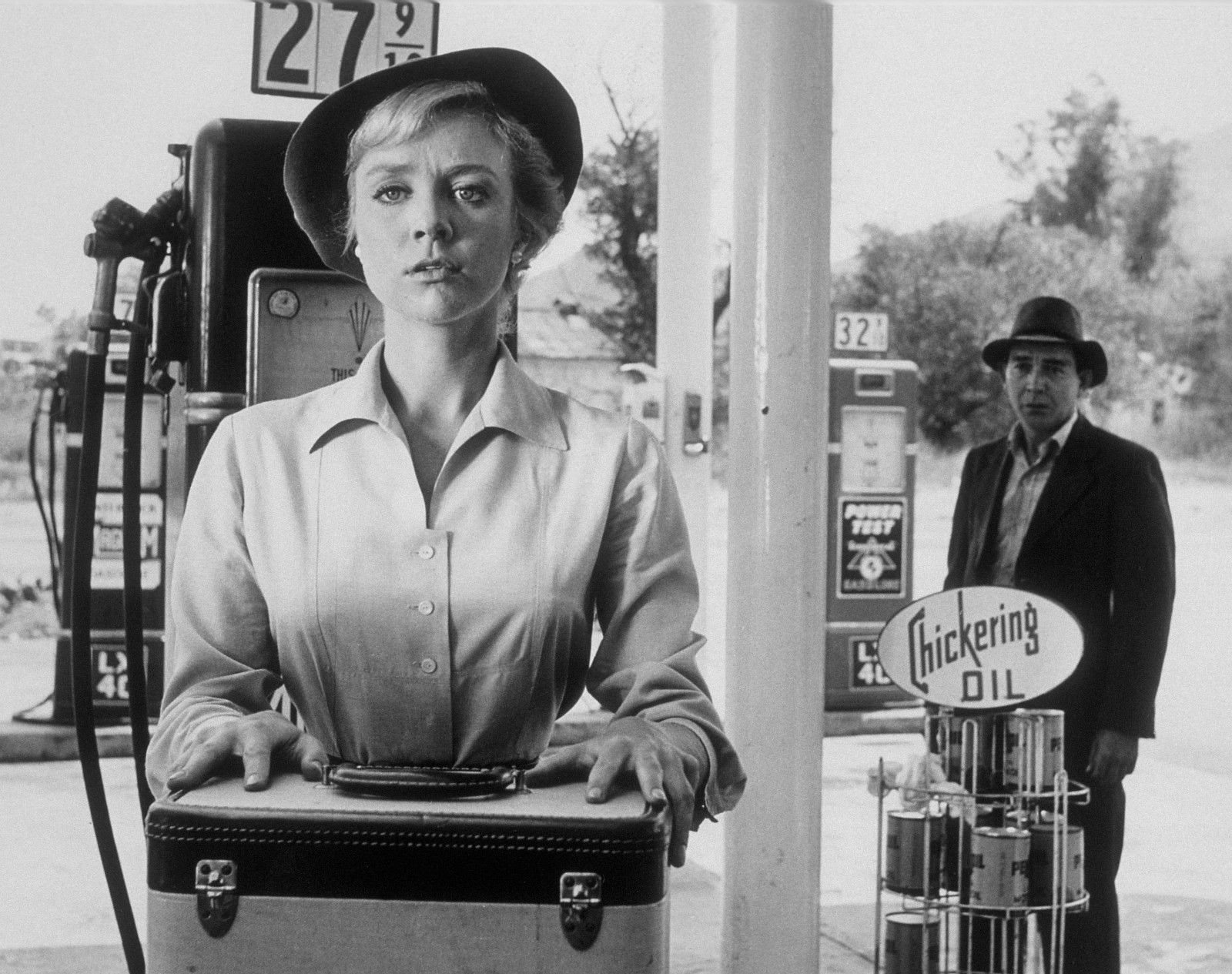
- Inger Stevens in a scene from the episode
- Episode no.: Season 1 Episode 16
- Directed by: Alvin Ganzer
- Teleplay by: Rod Serling
- Based on: The Hitch-Hiker by Lucille Fletcher
- Production code: 173-3612
- Original air date: January 22, 1960

Guest appearances
- Inger Stevens as Nan Adams; Leonard Strong as The Hitch-Hiker; Adam Williams as Sailor; Russ Bender as Counterman; Lew Gallo as Mechanic; George Mitchell as Gas Station Man; Eleanor Audley as Mrs. Whitney (voice)

Episode chronology
← Previous "I Shot an Arrow into the Air"	Next → "The Fever"
- The Twilight Zone (1959 TV series, season 1)

"The Hitch-Hiker" is the sixteenth episode of the American television anthology series The Twilight Zone which originally aired on January 22, 1960, on CBS. It is based on Lucille Fletcher's radio play The Hitch-Hiker. It is frequently listed among the series' greatest episodes.

== Opening narration ==
Her name is Nan Adams. She's twenty-seven years old. Her occupation: buyer at a New York department store. At present: on vacation, driving cross-country to Los Angeles, California from Manhattan.

The narration continues after the dialogue between Nan and the mechanic.

Minor incident on Highway 11 in Pennsylvania. Perhaps, to be filed away under "accidents you walk away from." But from this moment on, Nan Adams' companion on a trip to California will be terror. Her route: fear. Her destination: quite unknown.

== Plot ==
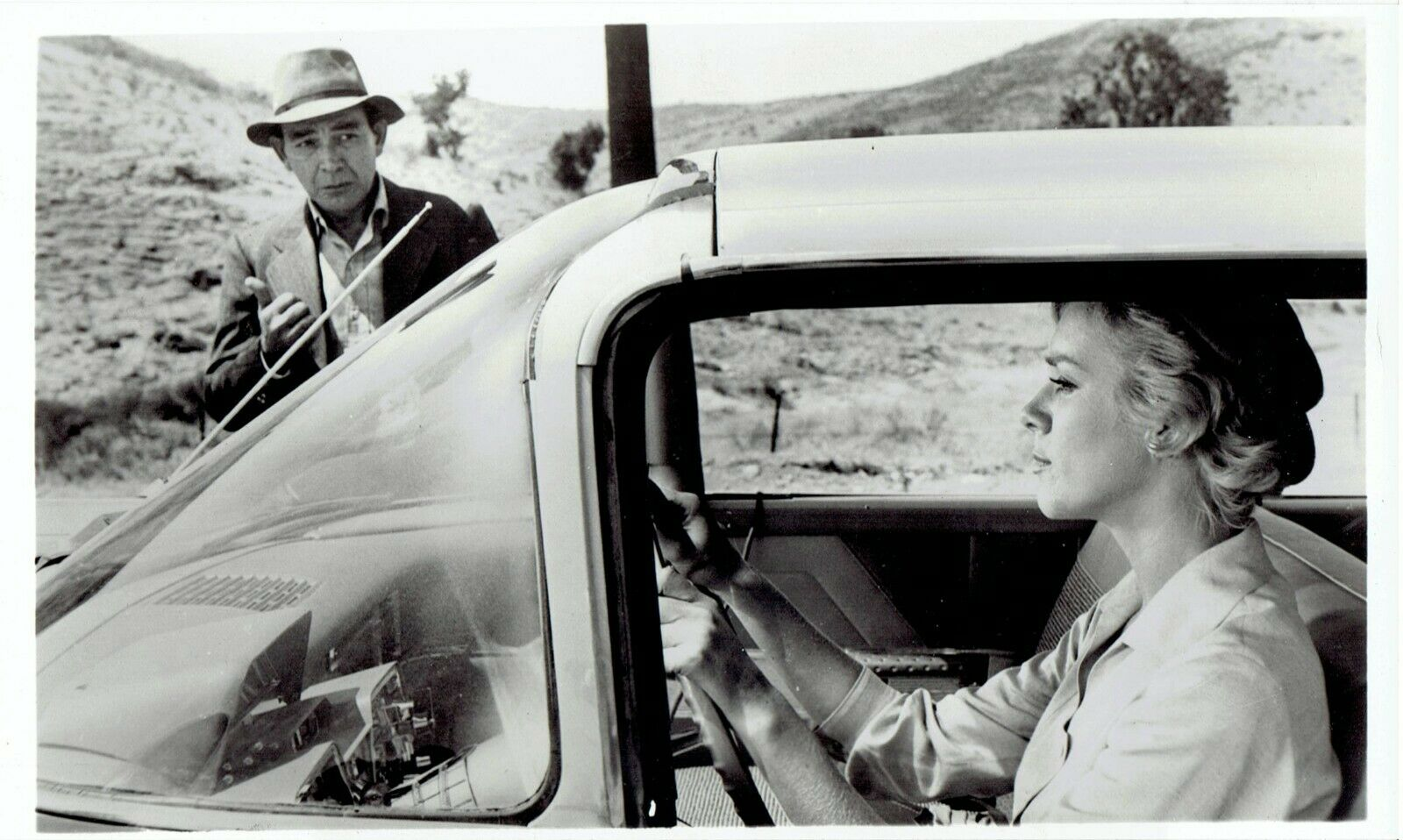
Strong and Stevens in "The Hitch-Hiker"

Nan Adams, on a cross-country road trip from New York City to Los Angeles, gets a flat tire on U.S. Route 11 in Pennsylvania and survives losing control of the car and skidding onto the shoulder. The mechanic she has called to come put a spare tire on comments that he is surprised she survived, saying "you shouldn't have called for a mechanic. Somebody should've called for a hearse." He directs her to follow him into town where he will supply her with a new tire. As she is driving from the site of her blow-out, Nan notices a shabby and strange-looking man hitchhiking. Later, as she is preparing to leave the service station in town, she again sees this hitchhiker, but the mechanic does not see him when she mentions it. Unnerved, she drives away. As she continues her trip, Nan sees the same hitchhiker thumbing for a ride again in Virginia and at several other points in her journey.

She grows increasingly frightened of him. When she stops at a railroad crossing for an oncoming train, the man is situated on the other side of the tracks. She decides to drive ahead but the car stalls on the tracks. She manages to restart the vehicle and back up just as the train speeds past.

Nan is now convinced that the hitchhiker is trying to kill her. She continues to drive, becoming more and more afraid, stopping only when necessary. Every time she stops, however, the hitchhiker is there, always ahead of her.

She takes a side road in New Mexico but becomes stranded when she runs out of gas. She reaches a gas station on foot but it is closed; although she rouses the proprietor from bed, he refuses to reopen and sell her gas due to the late hour. Nan is startled by a sailor on his way back to San Diego from leave. Eager for protection from the hitchhiker, she offers to drive the sailor all the way to his destination. He gladly accepts and persuades the station attendant to provide gas. As they drive together and discuss their mutual predicaments, she sees the hitchhiker on the road and swerves toward him. The sailor, who cannot see him, questions her driving; she admits she was trying to run over the hitchhiker. The sailor begins to fear for his safety and leaves her despite her efforts to have him stay, even going so far as offering to go out with him.

In Arizona, Nan stops to call her mother in Manhattan, New York City. The woman who answers the phone says Mrs. Adams is in the hospital, having suffered a nervous breakdown after finding out that her daughter, Nan, died in Pennsylvania six days ago when the car she was driving blew a tire and overturned. Nan realizes the truth: she didn't survive the accident in Pennsylvania and the hitchhiker is none other than the personification of death, patiently and persistently waiting for her to realize that she has been dead all along. She loses all emotion, concern, and feels empty.

Nan returns to the car and looks in the vanity mirror on the visor. Instead of her reflection, she sees the hitchhiker, who says, "I believe you're going...my way?"

== Closing narration ==
Nan Adams, age twenty-seven. She was driving to California; to Los Angeles. She didn't make it. There was a detour... through the Twilight Zone.

== Episode notes ==
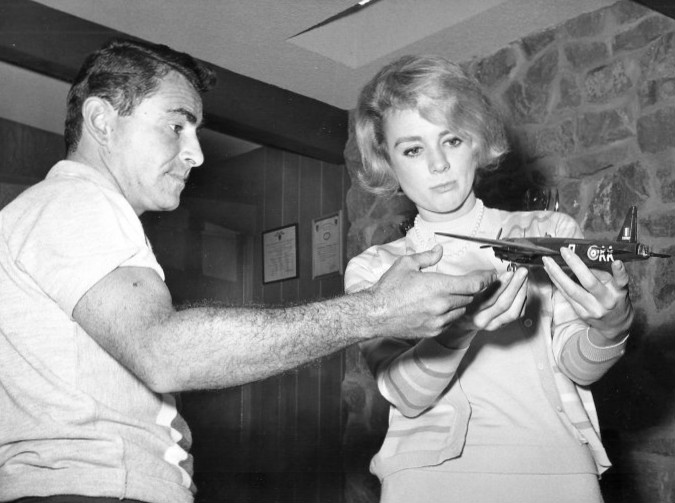
Rod Serling modeling an airplane with actress Inger Stevens, 1960

In the original radio play by Lucille Fletcher, the character of Nan was a man named Ronald Adams. When Serling adapted the script, he renamed the character after his daughter. The Hitch-Hiker was first presented on The Orson Welles Show (1941), Philip Morris Playhouse (1942), Suspense (1942), and The Mercury Summer Theater (1946). All of these radio productions were live performances starring Orson Welles as Ronald Adams.

When the teleplay was adapted for radio on The Twilight Zone Radio Dramas in 2002, the role of Nan Adams was played by Kate Jackson.

== Sources ==
- DeVoe, Bill. (2008). Trivia from The Twilight Zone. Albany, GA: Bear Manor Media. ISBN 978-1-59393-136-0
- Grams, Martin. (2008). The Twilight Zone: Unlocking the Door to a Television Classic. Churchville, MD: OTR Publishing. ISBN 978-0-9703310-9-0
