= Wuthering Heights (Herrmann) =

Opera by Bernard Herrmann

- Opera by Bernard Herrmann
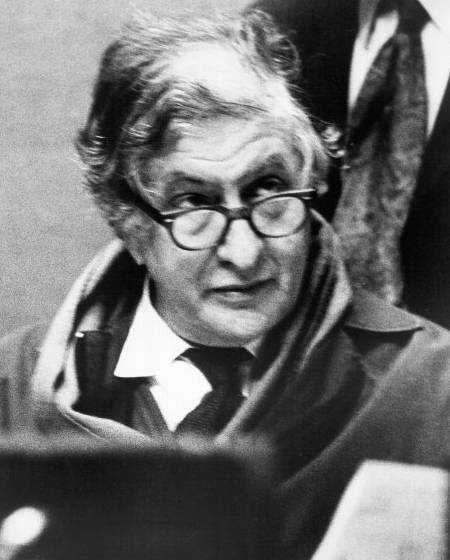
- The composer c. 1970
- Librettist: Lucille Fletcher
- Language: English
- Based on: Emily Brontë's Wuthering Heights
- Premiere: November 6, 1982 (shortened); Portland Opera

Wuthering Heights is the sole opera written by Bernard Herrmann. He worked on it from 1943 to 1951. It is cast in a prologue, 4 acts, and an epilogue that repeats the music of the prologue. The opera was recorded in full by the composer in 1966, but it had to wait until April 2011, the centenary of the composer's birth, for a complete theatrical performance (there was an abridged stage production in 1982 and a concert version in 2010).

The libretto was by Herrmann's first wife, Lucille Fletcher, based on the first part of Emily Brontë's 1847 novel of the same name. Fletcher also interpolated some text from the second part of the novel, and from some unrelated poems by Emily Brontë (such as "I have been wandering through the Green Woods"). By the time the work was finished, Fletcher and Herrmann had divorced and he had married her cousin Lucy.

Although the work is largely unknown, Lucille Fletcher said it was "perhaps the closest to his talent and heart".

== Genesis ==
Herrmann started work on the opera in April 1943, while composing the film score for Jane Eyre (an adaptation of Jane Eyre by Emily Brontë's sister Charlotte Brontë). It received a boost in 1946, when Herrmann and Fletcher made a visit to the moor country near Manchester, while he was fulfilling conducting engagements with the Hallé Orchestra. There, they visited the Brontë home at Haworth.

He completed the composition in Minneapolis. On the score, Herrmann wrote that he finished the work at 3:45 pm on 30 June 1951.

== Performances ==
Wuthering Heights was never staged in Herrmann's lifetime, despite a number of attempts on his part. One of the few opportunities to mount a staged production during Herrmann's lifetime was one offered by Julius Rudel, but either because Rudel insisted on cuts and a different, up-beat ending, which the composer refused to permit, or because of scheduling challenges – sources differ on the details – the production did not eventuate. It had earlier been under consideration by Sir John Barbirolli, conductor of the Hallé Orchestra, but a perusal of the enormous score caused him to reconsider. It was also briefly considered by the San Francisco Opera, as a project for Leopold Stokowski to conduct, but he was unavailable so the idea was dropped. In 1957, the Heidelberg Opera considered staging it, and Herrmann was convinced it was going ahead, even believing that the contracts had been signed for an April 1958 performance – but it too was dropped.

Its official world stage premiere was on 6 November 1982, almost seven years after Herrmann's death, by the Portland Opera in Portland, Oregon. However, that performance omitted 30 to 40 minutes of the music, and the ending was changed to the one Julius Rudel had proposed many years earlier. Orson Welles was asked to direct the production, but declined. The cast included mezzo-soprano Geraldine Decker as Nelly Dean. The production was to have been videotaped for later broadcast on PBS, but this was not done due to the high cost of videotape. Most reviews of the performance were unenthusiastic.

A concert version under the title Les Hauts de Hurlevent was presented on 14 July 2010 at the Radio France and Montpellier Languedoc-Rousillon Festival, conducted by Alain Altinoglu.

In April 2011, to mark the centenary of Bernard Herrmann's birth, Wuthering Heights was finally presented in full for the first time, by Minnesota Opera under Michael Christie. The production was filmed in HD, and was available for streaming by the Minnesota Opera from October 10 to October 24, 2020.

The European stage premiere was on 11 April 2015 by the Braunschweig Opera under Enrico Delamboye; the performance was broadcast live by Deutschlandradio Kultur but not published. The French stage premiere took place at Nancy in May 2019 conducted by Jacques Lacombe; Layla Claire and John Chest took the main roles, Orpha Phelan directed.

== Recordings ==
Wuthering Heights was recorded, in full, by Pye Records in 1966, under the direction of the composer, who conducted the Pro Arte Orchestra. The recording was made 11–13 May 1966. The singers included Morag Beaton as Cathy (soprano), Donald Bell as Heathcliff (baritone), Joseph Ward (as Edgar Linton), Elizabeth Bainbridge (as Isabel Linton), John Kitchiner, Pamela Bowden, David Kelly, and Michael Rippon. The project was principally funded by the composer. The recording, on 4 LPs, received a very limited release (Pye CCL 30173). It was re-released in 1972 (Unicorn UNB 400) and received very positive critical attention. It has since been transferred to CD (Unicorn-Kanchana UKCD 2050).

A live performance by the Orchestre National de Montpellier under Alain Altinoglu, with Boaz Daniel and Laura Aikin (Festival de Radio-France-Monpellier, July 2010) was released in October 2011 by the French label Accord/Universal. The 3-CD set received the Diapason d'Or-Découverte and the Diamand award from French magazines Diapason and Opéra.

A 60 minute suite (or cantata) for orchestra with soloists, adapted from the opera by Hans Sørensen in 2011 and performed by the Singapore Symphony Orchestra, conducted by Mario Venzago, was issued as a Chandos recording in 2023.

== Quotations ==
Wuthering Heights quotes various themes from Herrmann's earlier film scores:

- Citizen Kane (1941)
- The Magnificent Ambersons (1942; the "Second Nocturne", which was cut from the film, was re-used in the opera)
- Jane Eyre (1944; the melody representing the Jane-Rochester relationship recurs as Cathy's act 3 aria "I am Burning")
- The Ghost and Mrs. Muir (1947) (music from the beginning of the film was used in act 1; the sea music recurs in act 2; and the Andante Cantabile appears in act 3).

Some themes from the opera foreshadow Herrmann's later scores:

- Beneath the 12-Mile Reef (1953)
- Vertigo (1958)
- Journey to the Center of the Earth (1959)
- North by Northwest (1959)
- Marnie (1964).
