= Around the World (musical) =

- The Playbill for the Adelphi Theatre (May 31, 1946)
- Music: Cole Porter
- Lyrics: Cole Porter
- Book: Orson Welles
- Basis: Around the World in Eighty Days by Jules Verne
- Productions: 1946 Broadway

Around the World is a musical based on the 1873 Jules Verne novel Around the World in Eighty Days, with a book by Orson Welles and music and lyrics by Cole Porter. It involves an around-the-world adventure by Phileas Fogg. The expensive musical extravaganza opened on Broadway in May 1946 but closed after 75 performances.

As he did with his unsuccessful 1938 stage production of Too Much Johnson, Welles shot film sequences that were integrated into Around the World. This footage is lost.

== History ==
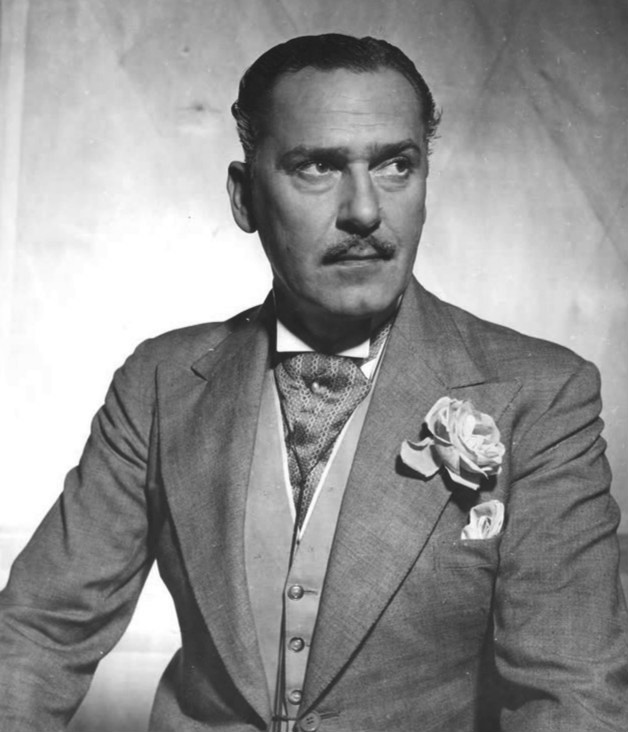
Arthur Margetson as Phileas Fogg

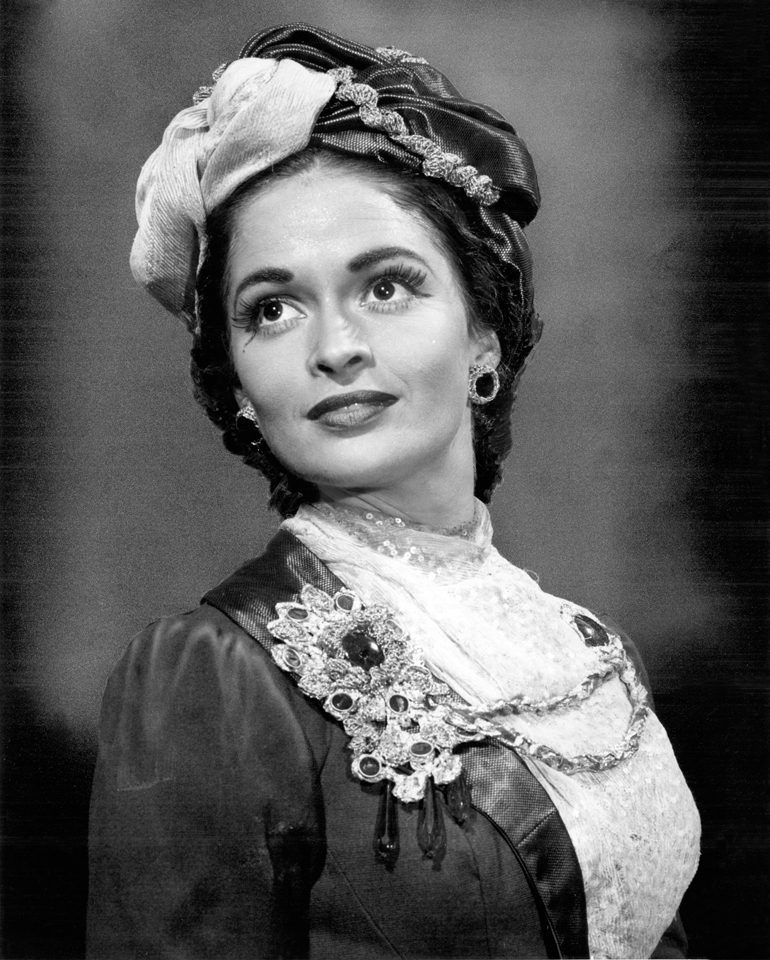
Mary Healy as Mrs. Aouda

Sheet music cover

After he finished shooting his 1946 film The Stranger, Welles decided to make a musical out of one of his favorite childhood books, Around the World in Eighty Days. He visualized an entire circus on stage, a train running through the West, and other extravagant production ideas. He raised money from Mike Todd, producer William Goetz, and Alexander Korda, who held the title's European rights. However, he had no money left for a star cast and used performers who were not well known. Also, according to critical Welles biographer Charles Higham, "Porter wrote the songs far too quickly and badly".

The show had a cast of 70 and included four mechanical elephants and 54 stage hands. When Mike Todd pulled out, Welles put up his own money. He also borrowed from Columbia Pictures president Harry Cohn, on a promise to write, produce, direct and star in a film for Cohn for no fee. The result was the 1947 film The Lady from Shanghai.

Playwright John van Druten described the musical as "enormous fun" and Joshua Logan said it was "fresh, witty, magical, exciting". However, with no story and unclear relationships between the characters, the show closed quickly, with Welles losing his savings, and the investors losing "large sums".

== Synopsis ==
Phileas Fogg bets that he can circumnavigate the world in 80 days, and sets out on the journey with his assistant, "Pat" Passepartout. They are pursued by the persistent but incompetent police officer Inspector Fix, who believes Fogg possesses stolen money.

== Production ==
Around the World was a play production by Orson Welles's Mercury Productions. It began pre-Broadway tryouts at the Boston Opera House, Boston on April 28, 1946; moved to the Shubert Theatre, New Haven on May 7; then transferred to the Shubert Theatre, Philadelphia on May 14.

It premiered on Broadway at the Adelphi Theatre on May 31, 1946, and closed on August 3, 1946 after 75 performances.

It was produced and directed by Welles with circus sequences created by Barbette, choreography by Nelson Barclift, costumes by Alvin Colt, set design by Robert Davison, and lighting by Peggy Clark. There were 38 sets, which Welles asked to be designed in the style of the films of Georges Méliès.

"Some of the more spectacular scenes included a giant eagle snatching an actor from the stage, an authentic Japanese circus troupe, a live elephant, a train crossing the rocky mountains, and a troop of Marines", wrote Welles scholar Bret Wood. "Motion picture footage was shot and integrated into the play to heighten its mad, vaudevillian qualities."

Technical problems were largely resolved before the New York opening. Welles performed various roles through the play's run, and once was required to play the lead: On the last night of the Boston run, when Arthur Margetson lost his voice, Welles read the part of Fogg and an understudy sang the songs. "The audience felt blessed," wrote biographer David Thomson. "It was a spellbinding night, with Welles talking everyone—audience included—through their parts."

Although audiences reportedly loved Around the World, its precarious finances—and the theatre's inadequate air conditioning—could not sustain it through the summer, and Welles was forced to close it. He personally lost an estimated $320,000 (equivalent to $5,280,000 in 2025) on the production. Due to bad legal advice, he was unable to claim the loss on his taxes, and it took him many years to pay the debt.

After the show's failure, Welles was keen to stage it in London, where Alexander Korda predicted it would be a great success, but British trade union rules forbade the elaborate props and sets built for the American production, and they had to be destroyed. They proved too expensive to reconstruct, and the show never again received a full-scale staging.

=== Program ===
This is the order of the program as it appears in The Playbill for the Adelphi Theatre production beginning Friday, May 31, 1946 (pp. 17–19):

ACT I.

- Scene 1. Movies.
- Scene 2. Interior of Jevit's Bank, London, England.
- Scene 3. Movies.
- Scene 4. Hyde Park.
- Scene 5. A London Street.
- Scene 6. Mr. Fogg's Flat in London.
- Scene 7. A Street before the Whist Club.
- Scene 8. The Card Room of the Whist Club.
- Scene 9. Fogg's Flat.
- Scene 10. The Charing Cross Railroad Station.
- Scene 11. Suez, Egypt.
- Scene 12. The End of Railway Tracks in British India.
- Scene 13. The Great Indian Forest.
- Scene 14. The Pagoda of Pilagi.
- Scene 15. A Jungle Encampment in the Himalayas.
- Scene 16. About the S.S. Tankadere on the China Sea.
- Scene 17. Movies.
- Scene 18. A Street of Evil Reputd in Hong-Kong.
- Scene 19. Interior of an Opium Hell in the Same City.
- Scene 20. The Oka Saka Circus, Yokohama, Japan.

ACT II.

- Scene 1. Movies.
- Scene 2. Lola's, a low place in Lower California.
- Scene 3. The Railroad Station in San Francisco.
- Scene 4. Movies.
- Scene 5. A Passenger Car on the Central Pacific Railway—Somewhere in the Rocky Mountains.
- Scene 6. A Perilous Pass at Medicine Bow.
- Scene 7. A Water Stop on the Banks of the Republican River.
- Scene 8. The Peak of Bald Mountain.
- Scene 9. The Harbor, Liverpool, England.
- Scene 10. The Gaol in Liverpool.
- Scene 11. A Cell in the Liverpool Gaol.
- Scene 12. A Street in London.
- Scene 13. Outside the London Whist Club.
- Scene 14. Grand Tableau.

Due to the size and scope of the production, the play ran approximately three hours with one intermission.

=== Film sequences ===
Around the World was a stage-and-screen hybrid. Five scenes in the production were motion pictures shot and edited by Orson Welles, in silent-movie style with title cards, and alternated with live action. The film is lost.

"These sequences are virtually forgotten in discussions of Welles' cinema," wrote Welles scholar Bret Wood. "The motion picture segments of Around the World, probably long since destroyed, would provide cineastes with an important piece of Wellesian history."

As was the Too Much Johnson footage, the Around the World film was black and white without sound in homage to the breathless chases and adventures of the silent era. Viewing the latter footage would be of great interest because by this time Welles had considerable experience in filmmaking and had acquired a definite cinematic style, drawn largely from other films.

The "Movies" scenes provided a silent introduction (with orchestral accompaniment) to each act of the play. Other sequences included a scene inside the bank and the rescue on the S.S. Tankadere, filmed in one day at the Edison Studios; and a chase through San Francisco. The chase was filmed in Boston and, like that in Too Much Johnson, featured actual locations.

The edited film sequences comprised about 30 minutes of projection time in the play.

=== Featured cast ===
These actors were featured in the "Who's who in the cast" section of The Playbill for the Adelphi Theatre production beginning Friday, May 31, 1946 (pp. 26–32):

- Arthur Margetson as Phileas Fogg
- Mary Healy as Mrs. Aouda
- Julie Warren as Molly Muggins
- Larry Laurence as Pat Passepartout
- Victoria Cordova as Lola
- Stefan Schnabel as Avery Jevity
- Brainerd Duffield as Mr. Benjamin Cruett-Spew
- Dorothy Bird as Meerahlah
- Guy Spaull as Ralph Runcbile
- Bernard Savage as Sir Charles Mandiboy
- Orson Welles as Dick Fix

=== Songs ===
This is the musical program as it appears in The Playbill for the Adelphi Theatre production beginning Friday, May 31, 1946 (pp. 21–23):

ACT I.

- Scene 4.
  "Look What I Found" — Molly, Pat, Singers
- Scene 6.
  "There He Goes, Mr. Phileas Fogg" — Fogg and Pat
- Scene 7.
  Reprise, "There He Goes, Mr. Phileas Fogg" — Fogg, Pat, Dancers and Singers
- Scene 12.
  "Meerahlah" — Singing Boys
  Dance — Meerahlah and Dancers
- Scene 14.
  "Suttee Procession" — Mrs. Aouda, Dancers and Singers
- Scene 15.
  Dance — The Dancers
- Scene 17.
  "Sea Chantey" — Singing Boys
  "Should I Tell You I Love You?" — Mrs. Aouda
- Scene 20.
  "Pipe Dreaming" — Pat and Singing Chorus
- Scene 21.
  Oka Saka Circus — Circus Performers

ACT II.

- Scene 2.
  Dance — Dorothy Bird, Bruce Cartwright, Jackie Cézanne and Dancers
  "If You Smile at Me" — Lola
  Reprise, "Pipe Dreaming" — Pat
  Reprise, "If You Smile at Me" — Molly
- Scene 8.
  "Wherever They Fly the Flag of Old England" — Fogg and Singing Girls
  "The Marine's Hymn" — Mrs. Aouda and Singing Boys
- Scene 11.
  Reprise, "Should I Tell You I Love You?" — Mrs. Aouda
- Scene 14.
  Finale — Entire Company

== Reception ==
Critic Lewis Nichols of The New York Times calling the musical "only fitfully amusing", noted that the production "has spared no expense in gadgets and effects. There are movies of the flicker era, a miniature train crossing a bridge ... and desperate men and bold clinging to the rails of pounding ships at sea. In other words, Around the World has the making for an hilarious evening. It does not come off because it lacks unity. There are too many styles fighting among themselves ... the dances generally are miles removed from Mr. Welles' burlesque. Finally, Cole Porter has written an inferior score, the songs being on the usual musical comedy subjects and delivered without the zest brought to the show by its mainstay. … Perhaps the best part of the show is a circus, with acrobats, a rope walker and with Mr. Welles, himself, as the magician."

Life magazine called the show "the most overstuffed conglomeration of circus, magic, movies, old-fashioned spectacle and penny peep shows that Broadway has seen since the days of Barnum's Museum. … For part of the time Around the World is wonderful, noisy fun. But, handicapped by Cole Porter's disappointing music and a slapdash production, it ends up like a Victorian whatnot more cluttered with junk than gems."

After New York drama critic Robert Garland wrote disdainfully that the show had "everything but the kitchen sink", Welles had a kitchen sink brought to him onstage during his curtain speech.

During the show's run, Bertolt Brecht went to see it, and went to congratulate Welles backstage after the show, declaring it to be "the greatest American theatre he had ever seen".

After Welles's death in 1985, critic Stanley Kaufmann recalled seeing Around the World, "his exuberant 1945 Broadway production … The show flopped, but sometimes I meet someone who saw it. Immediately we start to bore everyone else in the room by reminiscing about it."

== Adaptations ==
- During the show's run, Welles was also producing, directing, writing, presenting and co-starring in the anthology radio series The Mercury Summer Theatre of the Air. The show's first episode, broadcast on 7 June 1946, was a heavily abridged version of the musical, truncated to meet the radio programme's half-hour format. All of the principal cast participated, and the radio broadcast remains the only recording of any portion of Cole Porter's Around the World score. Songs include "Look What I Found" (Larry Laurence, Julie Warren), "There He Goes, Mr. Phileas Fogg" (Arthur Margetson) and "Should I Tell You I Love You?" (Mary Healy).
- After Welles's elaborate musical stage version of this Jules Verne novel, encompassing 38 different sets, went live in 1946, Welles shot some test footage in Morocco in 1947 for a film version. The footage was never edited, funding never came through, and Welles abandoned the project. Nine years later, the stage show's producer Mike Todd made his own award-winning film version of the book.
- The "Lost Musicals" series presented a concert version at the Lilian Baylis Theatre, Sadler's Wells, London, in June–July 2007.
