= Perfect (Logic song) =

Song by Logic

- Cover art for the official remix

Single by Logic

from the album No Pressure
- Released: August 11, 2020
- Genre: Hip-hop; trap
- Length: 1:40
- Label: Visionary; Def Jam
- Songwriters: Sir Robert Bryson Hall II; Arjun Ivatury; Michael Mule; Isaac De Boni; Keanu Torres
- Producers: 6ix; FnZ; Keanu Beats

Logic singles chronology
"Gah Damn High" (2020)	"Perfect" (2020)	"Intro" (2021)

"Perfect" is a song by American rapper Logic from his sixth studio album No Pressure (2020). It was sent to rhythmic contemporary radio on August 11, 2020. The song features uncredited vocals from rapper Juicy J, and was produced by 6ix, FnZ and Keanu Beats. The official remix of the song was released on September 24, 2021, featuring American rappers Lil Wayne and ASAP Ferg.

== Composition ==
The song contains an instrumental of "kick-snare patterns" and a "trunk-thumping, throwback Memphis beat", as well as a vocal sample from Street Fighter II. Tim Hoffman of Riff Magazine described Logic's flow in the song as reminiscent of "Humble" by Kendrick Lamar.

== Remix ==
In September 2020, a remix was hinted when Logic, in a comment on Twitter, wrote that Def Jam Recordings refused to pay Lil Wayne for a guest verse on the remix to "Perfect". However, the remix was leaked online months later and was eventually released on September 24, 2021. It features new verses from Lil Wayne and ASAP Ferg.

The remix received generally positive reviews from music critics; Jon Powell of Revolt wrote, "To no one's surprise, all artists are effortlessly able to match each other's energy with otherworldly bars and off-the-wall subject matter".

== Credits and personnel ==
Credits adapted from Tidal.

- Logic – vocals, songwriting
- 6ix – production, songwriting
- FnZ
  - Michael Mule – production, songwriting
  - Isaac De Boni – production, songwriting
- Keanu Beats – production, songwriting
- Anna Elyse – additional vocals
- Juicy J – uncredited additional vocals
- Bobby Campbell – mixing, recording, studio personnel

== Charts ==
Chart (2020)	Peak position
Canada Hot 100 (Billboard)	75
New Zealand Hot Singles (RMNZ)	14
US Billboard Hot 100	95
US Hot R&B/Hip-Hop Songs (Billboard)	38
US Rhythmic Airplay (Billboard)	39
