= The Hitch-Hiker (radio play) =

1941 radio play

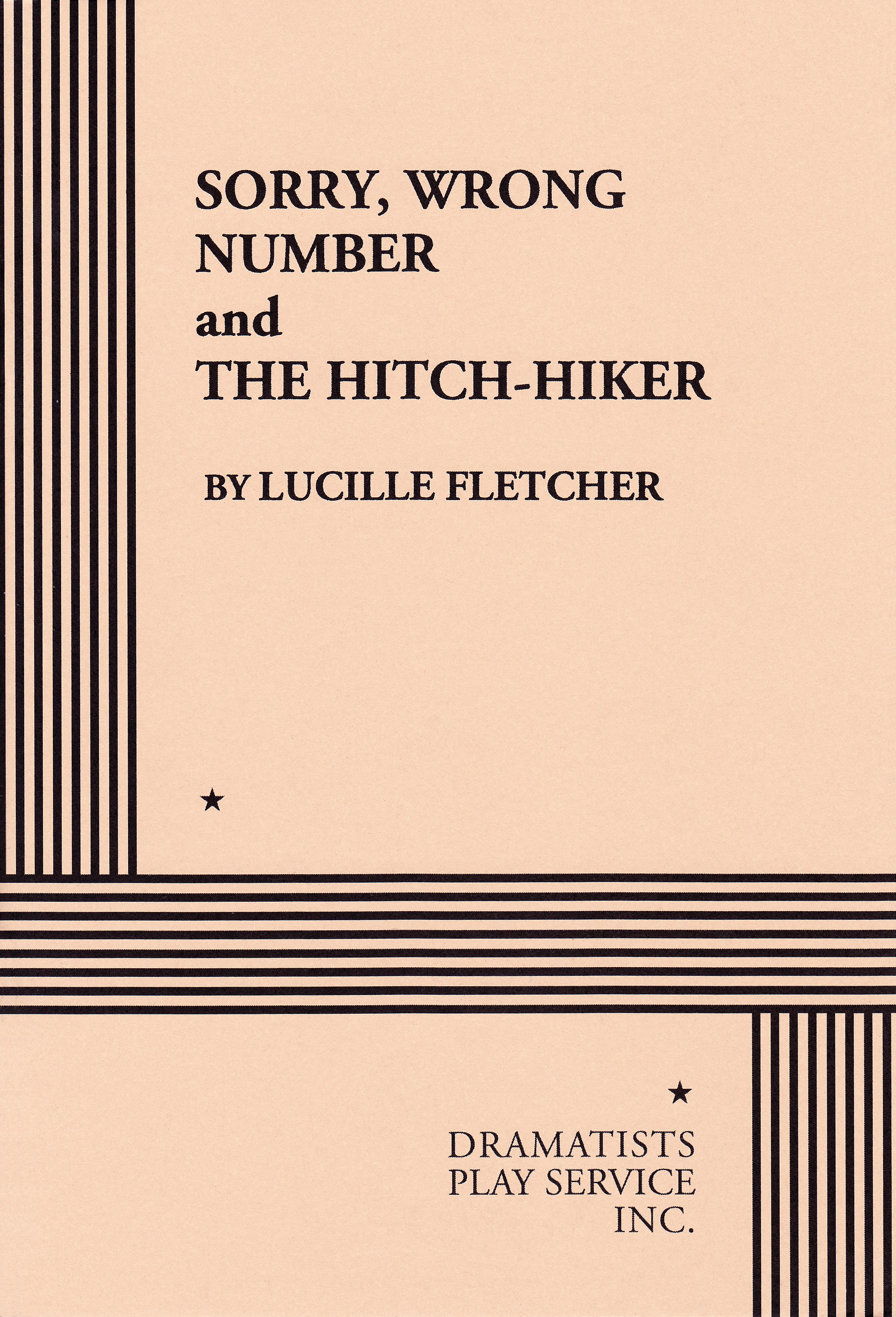
- ISBN 978-0-8222-1059-7
- Original language: English
- Written by: Lucille Fletcher
- Series: The Orson Welles Show
- Genre: Drama; Ghost story

Premiere
- Date: November 17, 1941
- Place: CBS Radio

The Hitch-Hiker is a radio play written by Lucille Fletcher. It was first presented on the November 17, 1941, broadcast of The Orson Welles Show on CBS Radio, featuring a score written and conducted by Bernard Herrmann, Fletcher's first husband. Welles performed The Hitch-Hiker four times on radio, and the play was adapted for a notable 1960 episode of the television series The Twilight Zone.

In the story, a man on a cross-country drive repeatedly notices the same hitch-hiker standing along the side of the road. Though the hitch-hiker's appearance is non-threatening, the driver becomes increasingly disturbed upon inexplicably seeing him again and again alongside multiple roads across several states. Eventually, the driver becomes too afraid to stop his car and even attempts to run the man down in hysterical paranoia. After making a phone call home, however, he is shocked to hear information that totally changes his understanding of his predicament.

== Plot ==
Ronald Adams is a young man embarking on a cross-country drive from his mother's home in Brooklyn, New York to California. Minutes after he gets underway in a steady rain, a hitch-hiker steps into the path of his car on the Brooklyn Bridge and Adams must swerve to avoid hitting him. The incident slips his mind until later in the day, when he is startled to see the same man hitch-hiking along the Pulaski Skyway in New Jersey. Adams shrugs it off as a coincidence until the next day, when he sees the same hitch-hiker along the Pennsylvania Turnpike, then several more times along highways in Ohio and beyond. Though the man looks like an ordinary hitch-hiker, Adams cannot understand how he keeps getting ahead along his route, and he is especially unnerved that his coat is always splattered with fresh rain even though the weather has been dry since Adams left New York City.

After a particularly unnerving encounter with the hitch-hiker at a lonely railroad crossing, Adams is reluctant to stop for the night. He is exhausted and desperate for company by the time he reaches Oklahoma, so he picks up a different hitch-hiker, a young woman heading to Amarillo, Texas. They make conversation until Adams sees the hitch-hiker again and swerves so violently that he almost crashes into a fence. His startled passenger hadn't seen anyone, and when Adams admits that he had been trying to run down the hitch-hiker, the woman flees his vehicle. She is soon picked up by a passing truck, and a shaken Adams decides to take a nap before continuing. However, he soon sees the mysterious man approaching across a nearby field and speeds away.

The hitch-hiker appears even more frequently as Adams races faster and faster across the American southwest, too afraid to pause for longer than it takes to refuel his car and buy a sandwich. Eventually he spots a payphone outside a campground in Gallup, New Mexico and stops to call his mother, feeling that he would be able to pull himself together upon hearing a familiar voice. He is confused when the phone at her residence is answered by a woman he does not recognize. After confirming that he has reached the correct number, the woman explains that Mrs. Adams was hospitalized with a nervous breakdown after the death of her son Ronald, who was killed six days before in an auto accident on the Brooklyn Bridge. Ronald Adams is too shocked to reply or insert more coins to continue the long distance conversation, and the call drops.

As the radio play ends, Adams is gravely concerned at not being able to find the hitch-hiker again after his call home:

Outside it is night—the vast, soulless night of New Mexico. A million stars are in the sky. Ahead of me stretch a thousand miles of empty mesa, mountains, prairies, desert. Somewhere, among them, he is waiting for me. Somewhere I shall know who he is—and who ... I am. ...

== Background ==
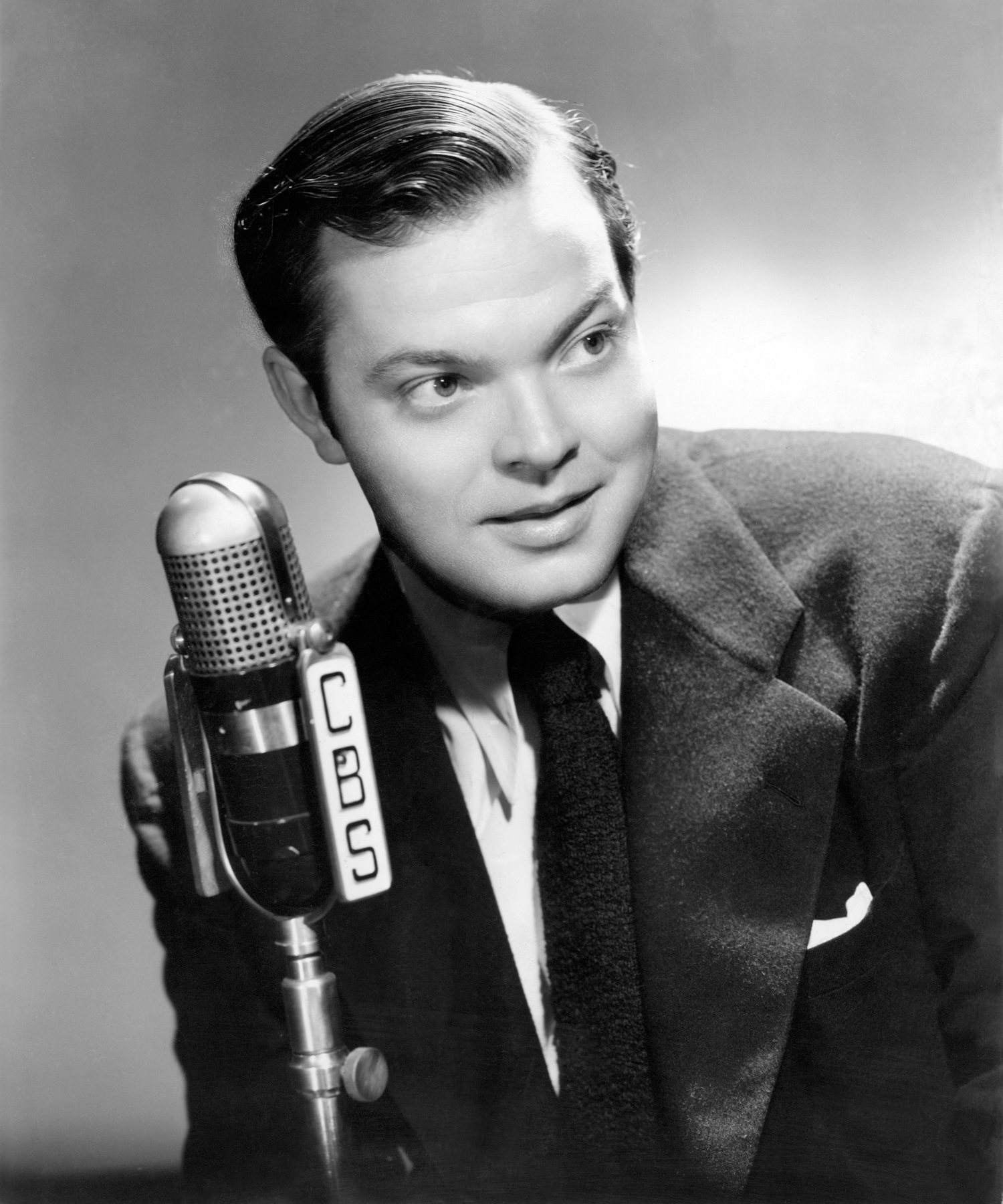
Written for Orson Welles, The Hitch-Hiker was first heard November 17, 1941, on The Orson Welles Show

Immediately after their marriage in October 1939, Lucille Fletcher and Bernard Herrmann left New York for Hollywood, where Herrmann was to begin work on the score of Orson Welles's first feature film, Citizen Kane. They traveled cross-country several times by air and by train; but their most memorable trip was made in 1940, with Herrmann driving their Packard convertible. Fletcher saw "an odd-looking man, first on the Brooklyn Bridge and then on the Pulaski Skyway. We never saw him again. However, I didn't quite know what to do with the idea until a year later, when … I conceived the idea of doing it as a ghost story."

"The Hitch-Hiker was written for Orson Welles in the days when he was one of the master producers and actors in radio," Fletcher wrote in her preface to the published version of the radio play, which adapts it for the stage. "It was designed to provide a vehicle not only for his famous voice but for the original techniques of sound which became associated with his radio presentations. … Orson Welles and his group of Mercury Players made of this script a haunting study of the supernatural, which can still raise hackles along my own spine."

The music for The Hitch-Hiker – called "one of Herrmann's most chilling scores" by biographer Steven C. Smith – was used in all four radio presentations. It was also re-recorded as stock music that can be heard (usually uncredited) on the soundtracks of several CBS television series, including the 1960 Twilight Zone adaptation of The Hitch-Hiker. Herrmann's score (CBS Music Library VIII 56-D-1) is in the UCLA Music Library Special Collections. "We really shared that story together," Fletcher said in a 1988 interview about Bernard Herrmann. "He was very interested in that story so he had to write the music for it."

== Presentations ==
The Hitch-Hiker was first performed by Orson Welles on the November 17, 1941, broadcast of The Orson Welles Show on CBS Radio. Welles also performed the radio play on Suspense (September 2, 1942), The Philip Morris Playhouse (October 16, 1942), and The Mercury Summer Theatre of the Air (June 21, 1946).

== Adaptations ==
=== The Twilight Zone ===
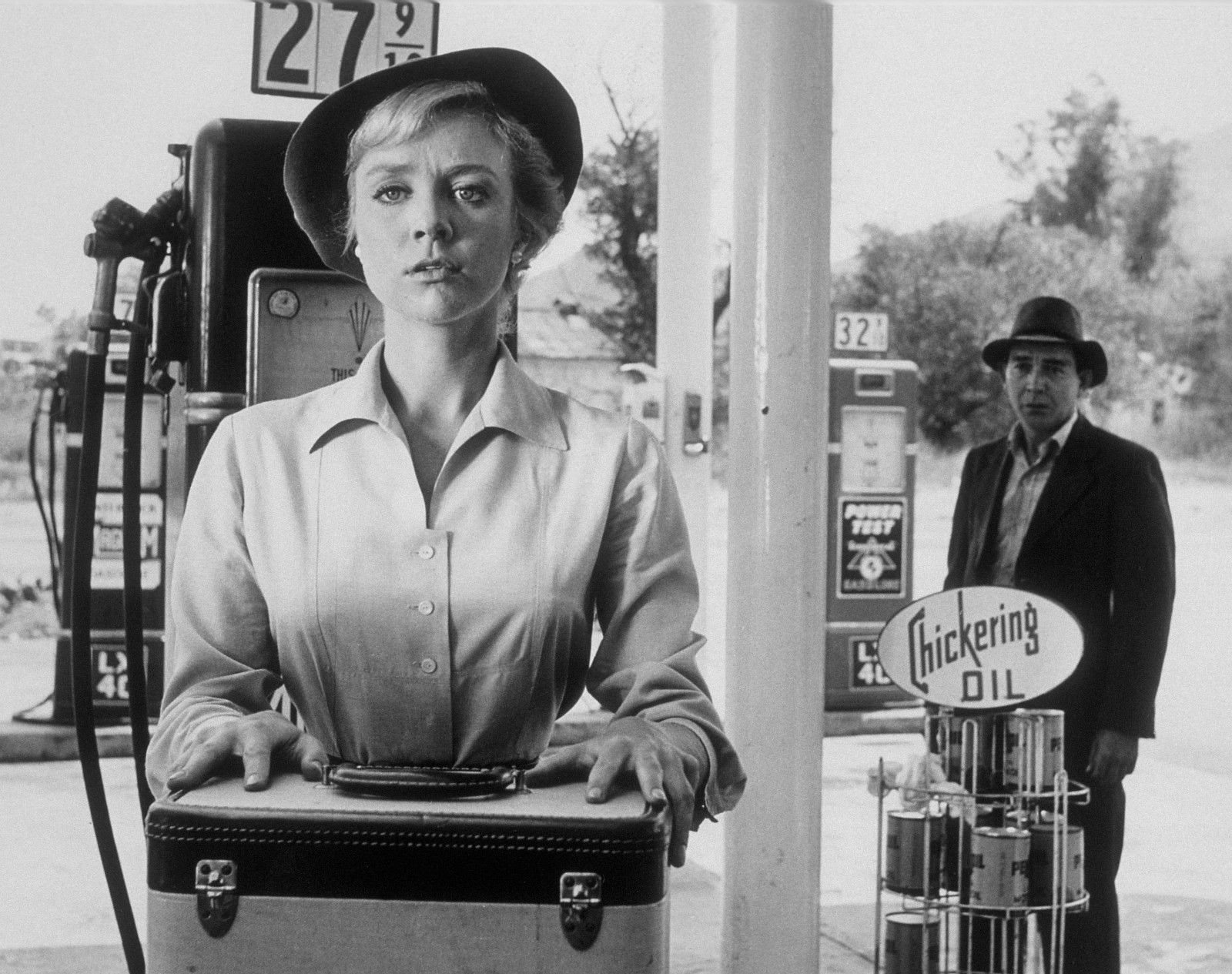
Inger Stevens and Leonard Strong in a scene from The Twilight Zone episode, "The Hitch Hiker" (1960)

Rod Serling adapted The Hitch-Hiker for the first season of his television anthology series The Twilight Zone for an episode originally broadcast on January 22, 1960. Serling's version mostly kept to the radio show plot with a few exceptions, most notably changing the driver to a young woman named Nan Adams (portrayed by Inger Stevens) and moving the fatal accident at the beginning of the story from the Brooklyn Bridge to a dusty road in rural Pennsylvania. When the teleplay was adapted for radio on The Twilight Zone Radio Dramas in 2002, the role of Nan Adams was played by Kate Jackson.

=== Other adaptions ===
In 2004, Mind City Productions adapted the Mercury Theater version of the radio play into an animated short film, adding animation directed by Michael Anthony Jackson to the original recording of the Mercury radio production. This was intended to be the first in a series of animated adaptations of Mercury radio productions, although to date, this remains the only entry in the series.

In 2011, a short film adaptation of "Hitchhiker" was produced and directed by Lawrence Anthony.

In 2020, a fragment of Welles’ radio broadcast was sampled by Hip-Hop and R&B artist Logic to be part of the first track of his studio album, No Pressure.
