= This Is My Best =

- Genre: Anthology drama
- Running time: 30 minutes
- Country of origin: United States
- Language(s): English
- Home station: CBS
- Hosted by: Owen James; John McIntire; Verne Smith; Jimmy Wallington; Orson Welles
- Written by: True Eames Boardman; Dick Carroll; Norman Corwin; Robert Riley Crutcher; Betty Hopkins; Milton Geiger; W.A. Krauss; Robert Tallman; Orson Welles
- Directed by: Don Clark
- Original release: September 5, 1944 – May 28, 1946
- No. of series: 2
- No. of episodes: 75
- Audio format: Monaural sound

This Is My Best is an American radio anthology series, sponsored by Cresta Blanca wines, which ran on CBS Radio from 1944 to 1946 in 30-minute episodes.

The series aired for two seasons, one of 39 episodes and the other of 36, before its cancellation in 1946, and adapted a combination of literary classics, contemporary literature and films. It was performed before a live audience.

Guest stars included many notable actors of the day, such as Ralph Bellamy, Jack Benny, Joan Blondell, Joe E. Brown, Virginia Bruce, Jack Carson, Ray Collins, Robert Cummings, Louis Hayward, Rita Hayworth, Hedda Hopper, Van Johnson, Charles Laughton, Ida Lupino, Virginia Mayo, Burgess Meredith, Thomas Mitchell, Gregory Peck, Rosalind Russell, Ann Rutherford, Sylvia Sidney, Akim Tamiroff and Keenan Wynn.

The series is most closely associated with Orson Welles, who guest-starred in several earlier episodes, and then from episode 27 (broadcast 13 March 1945), took over as producer, writer, host and star. He began with an adaptation of Heart of Darkness, something he had previously adapted for The Mercury Theatre on the Air and The Campbell Playhouse, and which he had attempted to make as his first film in 1940 before turning his attention to Citizen Kane. However, Welles' running of the show was short-lived, and he left after just seven episodes. Welles' suffered strained relations with the show's nominal director, Don Clark, complaining that Clark could be "very drunk" in the studio, whilst Welles annoyed Clark by effectively taking the directing out of his hands. He was fired after a disagreement with Clark, when Welles wanted to substitute an adaptation of Don't Catch Me by Robert Powell which Clark had scheduled with his own adaptation of Ferenc Molnár's The Guardsman, starring himself and his wife Rita Hayworth. Despite the show's sponsors being very happy with the idea (Hayworth was then at the peak of her stardom), Welles was sacked within three hours of the argument. Welles went on to front another radio anthology series for Cresta Blanca and CBS later that year, The Orson Welles Theatre, which lasted just two months.

It was during Welles' stint that his friend President Franklin D. Roosevelt died, and so he made his penultimate episode, I Will Not Go Back (broadcast 17 April 1945) an FDR special, dedicating it to "an American president who has fallen in battle."

In the 1950s, the program aired on The Armed Forces Radio Service as "The Globe Theater."
