= No Pressure (Logic album) =

Studio album by Logic
- Released: July 24, 2020
- Recorded: 2019–2020
- Genre: Hip-hop
- Length: 59:48
- Labels: Def Jam; Visionary
- Producers: Chris Zarou; 2forWoyne; 6ix; FnZ; Gravez; Kajo; Keanu Beats; Like; Logic; Maneesh Bidaye; MTK; No I.D.; PSTMN; Toro y Moi

Logic chronology
Confessions of a Dangerous Mind (2019)	No Pressure (2020)	YS Collection Vol. 1 (2021)

Singles from No Pressure
- 1. "Perfect" Released: August 11, 2020

No Pressure is the sixth studio album by American rapper Logic. It was released through Def Jam Recordings and Visionary Music Group on July 24, 2020. The production on the album was handled by Logic himself, No I.D., 6ix, and FnZ, among others. No Pressure contains samples from different classic radio shows, with the final track on the album being solely an excerpt from Orson Welles Commentaries. The album was marketed as Logic's final commercial release, however, this statement was retracted upon the release of Logic's following mixtape Bobby Tarantino III. It was supported by the single "Perfect", which was sent to rhythmic contemporary radio on August 11, 2020.

No Pressure received critical acclaim upon release and was considered a return to form for the Maryland MC following his 2019 studio effort Confessions of a Dangerous Mind. Many critics also commended him for his writing, vocal performances, and for returning to his roots. The album debuted at number two on the US Billboard 200, earning 221,000 album-equivalent units in its first week. It debuted behind Taylor Swift's eighth studio album, Folklore. Shortly after his retirement, Logic embarked on a streaming career on Twitch. On June 16, 2021, Logic announced his comeback from retirement.

== Background and release ==
On July 16, 2020, Logic announced the album and also announced that the album would be his last as he would be retiring. In the tweet, he stated that it had been a "great decade", and it was time to "be a great father." The next day, he debuted photos of his son, "Little Bobby". His son is also credited as a songwriter on the twelfth track, "A2Z". However, Logic returned to rapping on June 16, 2021.

To celebrate the release, Logic had a "release party extravaganza" on Twitch, where, after playing the album, he became emotional while thanking his fans and other rappers such as Kendrick Lamar, J. Cole, and Drake for how their contributions as his contemporaries inspire him and support him, whether they know it or not.

Sam Spratt, who designed the album cover, inspired American rapper Kid Cudi with it and Cudi asked Spratt to design the cover for his album Man on the Moon III: The Chosen, which was released on December 11, 2020.

Music videos for the tracks "DadBod" and "Aquarius III" were released in the week following the album's release.

== Composition and recording ==
Opening track "No Pressure" features a sample from Orson Welles's The Hitch-Hiker, with Logic cutting in the script with words and phrases. The track also features David Hayter, reprising his role as Solid Snake.

The ending track, "Obediently Yours", uses a sample from the July 28, 1946 episode of Welles's Orson Welles Commentaries. Many listeners praised the usage of samples from Welles, including his commentary on the Isaac Woodard case. Beatrice Welles, his youngest daughter, commented that she "was pleased with the final product and thrilled that her father's message on racism from 76 years ago has struck a chord with a younger audience".

== Critical reception ==
Professional ratings
Aggregate scores
Source	Rating
Metacritic	78/100
Review scores
Source	Rating
AllMusic	4/5 stars
Entertainment Weekly	B
HipHopDX	3/5
NME	4/5 stars
Our Culture Mag	3.5/5 stars
RIFF	8/10

No Pressure received generally positive reviews from critics, with some calling it a return to form for the Maryland MC. At Metacritic, which assigns a normalized rating out of 100 to reviews from mainstream publications, the album received a weighted average score of 78, based on six reviews, indicating "Generally favorable reviews". It is the highest score in Logic's discography.

Will Lavin of NME gave the album four out of five stars, saying that the album "continues the trend even as he bids farewell to the art form that raised him and gave him a platform to speak his truth." A.D. Amorosi of Variety said that the album is a "solid, soulful finale" for his career, and that Logic was in his best, "kid-like Q-Tip mode." Tim Hoffman of RIFF magazine gave the album an 8/10, calling it a "masterful final release" for Logic.

In the review for AllMusic, Fred Thomas called it one of Logic's "best and most enjoyable albums, wrapping up an electrified run with his most clearheaded and honest material yet." Donna-Claire Chesman and Yoh Phillips of DJBooth both praised the rapper for having the album be "driven by love" of life, self, music, and "all the feel-good emotions", as well as finally "finding balance" with himself. Judah Charles Lotter of Meaww called the album a "powerful and infectiously catchy swansong album."

=== Accolades ===
Year-end lists for No Pressure
Publication	Accolade	Rank	Ref
Riff Magazine	The Best Albums of 2020	62	
Billboard	The 20 Best Rap Albums of 2020	12	
YardBarker	The 20 Best Hip-Hop albums of 2020	—N/a	

== Commercial performance ==
No Pressure debuted at number two on the US Billboard 200 chart, earning 221,000 album-equivalent units (including 172,000 copies as pure album sales) in its first week. This became Logic's seventh US top-ten debut. The album also accumulated a total of 65.16 million on-demand streams of the set's tracks in the week ending August 8.

== Track listing ==
Credits adapted from Tidal.

No.	Title	Writer(s)	Producer(s)	Length
1.	"No Pressure Intro"	Sir Robert Bryson Hall II; Gabriel Stevenson; Orson Welles	Like	2:54
2.	"Hit My Line"	Hall; Arjun Ivatury; Alan Hawkshaw	6ix	4:25
3.	"GP4"	Hall; Ivatury; Ernest Wilson; Adam Feeney; André Benjamin; Antwan Patton; Carlton Ridenhour; Gary Rinaldo; Hank Shocklee; Rui Wen Pan	6ix; No I.D.	4:34
4.	"Celebration"	Hall; Wilson; Jeffrey Smith; Thomas Bell; Linda Epstein; Dana Middleton; Anthony Manco, Jr.	Logic; No I.D.	3:50
5.	"Open Mic\\Aquarius III"	Hall; Ivatury; Christopher Justice; Dawoyne Lawson; Raymond Angry; George Clinton; George Worrell; Garry Shider	Logic; 6ix; Gravez; 2forWoyne	5:03
6.	"Soul Food II"	Hall; Ivatury; Matthew Crabtree; Steve Wyreman; Khalil Abdul-Rahman	Logic; 6ix; MTK	5:33
7.	"Perfect"	Hall; Ivatury; Michael Mule; Isaac De Boni; Keanu Torres	6ix; FnZ; Keanu Beats	1:40
8.	"Man I Is"	Hall; Ivatury; Benjamin; Patton; Marcus Edwards; Lana Moorer; Patrick Brown; Philip Clendeninn	Logic; 6ix	4:29
9.	"DadBod"	Hall; Ivatury; Kyle Metcalfe	6ix; PSTMN	4:54
10.	"5 Hooks"	Hall; Ivatury; Chazwick Bundick	Logic; 6ix; Toro y Moi	3:52
11.	"Dark Place"	Hall; Ivatury; Bundick; Clinton; Worrell; Shider; Arkae Tuazon; Dexter Wansel	6ix; Toro y Moi; Kajo	3:15
12.	"A2Z"	Hall; Wilson; Maneesh Bidaye; Little Bobby	No I.D.; Bidaye	3:08
13.	"Heard Em Say"	Hall; Denny Newman	Logic	3:36
14.	"Amen"	Hall; Ivatury; Metcalfe; Tyler Okonma; O'Kelly Isley Jr.; Ronald Isley; Rudolph Isley	Logic; 6ix; PSTMN	2:26
15.	"Obediently Yours"	Hall; Wilson; Welles	No I.D.	6:09
Total length:				59:48

Notes

- "Man I Is" is stylized in lowercase letters.
- "No Pressure Intro" features additional vocals by Anna Elyse and David Hayter.
- "Hit My Line" features additional vocals by Anna Elyse and Keenen Wayans.
- "GP4" features additional vocals by Anna Elyse, No I.D., and Tramayne "TMan" Hudson.
- "Celebration" features additional vocals by Anna Elyse, and uncredited vocals by Silas.
- "Open Mic\\Aquarius III" features additional vocals by Damian Hudson.
- "Soul Food II" features additional vocals by 6ix, Anna Elyse, Big Pep, Bobby Campbell, Brittney Noell Hall, Jordan "Bo" Harris, Josh Lippi, Kevin Randolph, Maui Marc, Rhetorik, Steve Wyreman, and The Homies.
- "Perfect" features uncredited additional vocals by Juicy J and additional vocals by Anna Elyse.
- "Man I Is" features additional vocals by Anna Elyse and Lil' Keke.
- "A2Z" features additional vocals from Anna Elyse, Little Bobby, Steve Blum, and Tramayne "TMan" Hudson.
- "Amen" features additional vocals from Kevin Randolph and Steve Blum.

Sample credits

- "No Pressure Intro" contains a sample from The Hitch-Hiker, written and performed by Orson Welles.
- "Hit My Line" contains a sample of "We Got Love", written by Alan Hawkshaw, and performed by Sunny; and uncredited elements of "Attention", written by Robert Hunt, and performed by Head West.
- "GP4" contains a sample from "Mood", written by Rui Wen Pan and Adam Feeney, and performed by VinnyxProd and Frank Dukes from Kingsway Music Library Presents - VinnyxProd Vol. 1; interpolations of "Elevators (Me & You)", written by André Benjamin and Antwan Patton, and performed by Outkast; and samples of "Shut 'Em Down", written by Carlton Ridenhour, Gary Rinaldo and Hank Shocklee, and performed by Public Enemy.
- "Celebration" contains a sample from "A World Without You", written by Jeffrey Smith, Dana Middleton, Thomas Bell and Linda Epstein, and performed by Johnson, Hawkins, Tatum & Durr; and uncredited samples of "One Man Band", written by Milton Brand, and performed by Monk Higgins.
- "Open Mic\\Aquarius III" contains a sample of "A Peace of Light", written by Ahmir Thompson and Raymond Angry, and performed by The Roots; and samples of "Do That Stuff", written by George Clinton, George Worrell and Garry Shider, and performed by Parliament. The latter sample can later be found on "Dark Place".
- "Soul Food II" contains samples of "Soul Food", written by Sir Robert Bryson Hall II, Khalil Abdul-Rahman, Alkebulan Williams and Arjun Ivatury, and performed by Logic; samples of "Choose", written by Matthew Crabtree, and performed by MTK; and an uncredited sample of "Maldonne", written and performed by Christiane Legrand.
- "Perfect" contains elements of the video game Street Fighter II: The World Warrior.
- "Man I Is" contains a sample from "Dreamflower", written by Phillip Clendeninn, and performed by Tarika Blue; a sample of "Knockin' Doorz Down", written by Chad Butler, Marcus Edwards, Michael Shawn Robinson and Marvin Rucker, and performed by Pimp C; and a sample of "SpottieOttieDopaliscious", written by Benjamin, Patton, and Patrick Brown, and also performed by Outkast.
- "5 Hooks" contains samples of "Grown Up Calls", written by Chazwick Bundick, and performed by Toro y Moi.
- "Dark Place" contains samples of "Theme From the Planets", written and performed by Dexter Wansel; and a sample from Status of People, written and performed by Alan Watts.
- "Heard Em Say" contains samples of "Lies (Through the 80s)", written by Denny Newman, and performed by Manfred Mann's Earth Band.
- "Amen" contains elements of "Running Out of Time", written and performed by Tyler, the Creator; and samples of "It's Your Thing", written by O'Kelly Isley Jr., Ronald Isley and Rudolph Isley, and performed by The Isley Brothers.
- "Obediently Yours" contains a sample from the August 11, 1946 episode of Orson Welles Commentaries, also written and performed by Welles.

== Charts ==
=== Weekly charts ===
Chart performance for No Pressure
Chart (2020)	Peak position
Australian Albums (ARIA)	14
Austrian Albums (Ö3 Austria)	34
Belgian Albums (Ultratop Flanders)	27
Canadian Albums (Billboard)	4
Danish Albums (Hitlisten)	31
Dutch Albums (Album Top 100)	16
Finnish Albums (Suomen virallinen lista)	26
French Albums (SNEP)	158
German Albums (Offizielle Top 100)	82
Irish Albums (Official Charts)	18
New Zealand Albums (RMNZ)	9
Norwegian Albums (VG-lista)	14
Swedish Albums (Sverigetopplistan)	28
Swiss Albums (Schweizer Hitparade)	24
UK Albums (Official Charts)	11
US Billboard 200	2
US Top R&B/Hip-Hop Albums (Billboard)	1
US Top Rap Albums (Billboard)	1

=== Year-end charts ===
2020 year-end chart performance for No Pressure
Chart (2020)	Position
US Billboard 200	163
US Top R&B/Hip-Hop Albums (Billboard)	59
