= The Orson Welles Show (radio series) =

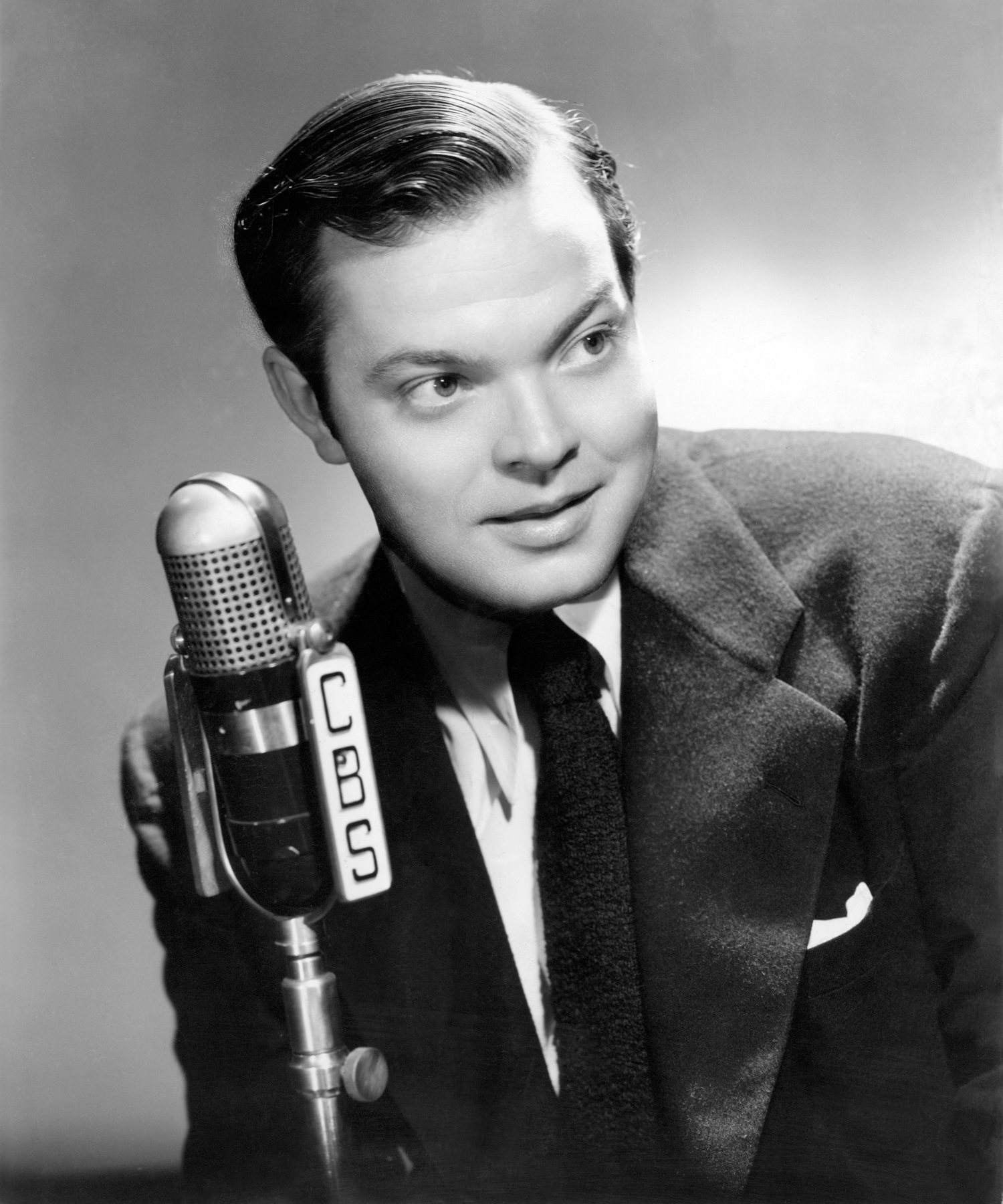
- CBS Radio promotional photo for The Orson Welles Show (September 5, 1941)
- Genre: Anthology series Almanac; Variety
- Running time: 30 minutes
- Country of origin: United States
- Language(s): English
- Home station: CBS
- Hosted by: Orson Welles
- Starring: Orson Welles; Blanche Yurka; Conrad Binyon; Brenda Forbes; Hans Conried, Dolores del Río other radio, film, and theater personalities
- Written by: Orson Welles; Roger Quayle Denny; Carl Glick others
- Directed by: Orson Welles
- Produced by: Orson Welles
- Original release: September 15, 1941 – February 2, 1942
- No. of series: 1
- No. of episodes: 19

The Orson Welles Show (1941–42), also known as The Orson Welles Theater, Orson Welles and his Mercury Theater and the Lady Esther Show (after its sponsor), was a live CBS Radio series produced, directed and hosted by Orson Welles. Broadcast Mondays at 10 p.m. ET, it made its debut September 15, 1941. Its last broadcast was February 2, 1942.

== History ==
Sponsored by Lady Esther cosmetics, The Orson Welles Show presented dramatic adaptations, poetry, history, music, comedy, and a commentary segment by Welles titled "Almanac." Nineteen broadcasts were produced.

Created each week with the same basic crew, The Orson Welles Show featured music by Bernard Herrmann and a regular cast that included Conrad Binyon, Hans Conried, Dolores del Río, Brenda Forbes and Blanche Yurka. On many of the shows, Cliff Edwards recreated the voice of Jiminy Cricket and bantered with Welles between segments. Most of the series was produced while Welles was shooting his second feature film, The Magnificent Ambersons (October 28, 1941 – January 31, 1942), and many of the cast participated in The Orson Welles Show. On January 6, 1942, Welles also began filming Journey into Fear.

The November 17, 1941, broadcast marked the debut of The Hitch-Hiker, an original radio play by Lucille Fletcher (wife of Bernard Herrmann) that has become a classic of suspense. On the broadcast of December 29, 1941, Rita Hayworth was the guest player; this was the first meeting between Welles and Hayworth, who were married in September 1943.

Welles concluded the final broadcast of The Orson Welles Show February 2, 1942, with a statement: "Tomorrow night the Mercury Theatre starts for South America. The reason, put more or less officially, is that I've been asked by the Office of the Coordinator of Inter-American Affairs to do a motion picture especially for Americans in all the Americas, a movie which, in its particular way, might strengthen the good relations now binding the continents of the Western Hemisphere." (Note: Welles later wrote that he embarked on the filming of It's All True at the request of Nelson Rockefeller, Jock Whitney and Franklin D. Roosevelt, who put it to Welles in the strongest terms that the project would help inter-American affairs during wartime.)

== Episodes ==
#	Date	Program
1	September 15, 1941	"Sredni Vashtar," story by Saki "Hidalgo", original play about Mexican history "An Irishman and a Jew," story by Geoffrey Household "Boogie Woogie" by Meade Lux Lewis, piano "Almanac"; Extant
2	September 22, 1941	"The Right Side," with Elliott Lewis (Faust) and Ray Collins (Devil) "The Sexes," story by Dorothy Parker, with Betty Field and Richard Carlson "Murder in the Bank," with Ruth Gordon "The Golden Honeymoon," story by Ring Lardner, with Ruth Gordon (Mother) and Orson Welles (Father) "Almanac" and Jiminy Cricket (Cliff Edwards); Presumed lost
3	September 29, 1941	"The Interlopers," original radio play, with Elliott Lewis (narrator), Ray Collins and Orson Welles "Song of Solomon," read by Orson Welles "I'm a Fool," story by Sherwood Anderson, with Orson Welles and Nancy Gates "Almanac" and Jiminy Cricket; Extant
4	October 6, 1941	"The Black Pearl," original story by Norman Foster "There's a Full Moon Tonight" "Annabel Lee," poem by Edgar Allan Poe, read by Orson Welles; Cast: Orson Welles, Edgar Barrier, Ray Collins, Dorothy Comingore, Joseph Cotten, Erskine Sanford, Paul Stewart; Extant
5	October 13, 1941	"If in Years to Come," by Earle Reed Silvers, with Orson Welles, Marsha Hunt and Agnes Moorehead "Noah Webster's Library," skit with Lucille Ball, Joseph Cotten and Marsha Hunt; Four poems read by Lucille Ball "Almanac"; Extant
6	October 20, 1941	"Romance," story by Ellis Parker Butler, with Joseph Cotten (narrator), Tim Holt, Anne Baxter, Agnes Moorehead, Ray Collins "The Prisoner of Assiout," story by Grant Allen, with Orson Welles, Everett Sloane, Ray Collins, Erskine Sanford, Edgar Barrier, Marlo Dwyer; Shakespeare sonnet read by Orson Welles "Almanac"; Extant
7	November 3, 1941	"Wild Oranges," adapted from the novel by Joseph Hergesheimer, with Frances Dee, Ray Collins, Paul Stewart, Gale Gordon, John Woodfolk "Almanac"; Extant
8	November 10, 1941	"That's Why I Left You," story by John Nesbitt, with Ray Collins (narrator), Stuart Erwin, June Collyer, Joseph Cotten, Agnes Moorehead "The Maysville Minstrel," story by Ring Lardner, with Joseph Cotten, Ray Collins, Stuart Erwin, June Collyer "Almanac"; Extant
9	November 17, 1941	The Hitch-Hiker, original radio play by Lucille Fletcher, with Orson Welles and other cast Presumed lost
10	November 24, 1941	A Farewell to Arms, adapted from the novel by Ernest Hemingway; Cast: Ginger Rogers (Catherine), Orson Welles (Frederick Henry); Presumed lost
11	December 1, 1941	"Something's Going to Happen to Henry," story by Wilma Shore and Louis Solomon, with Janet Gaynor, Joseph Cotten, Ray Collins, Glenn Anders "Wilbur Brown, Habitat: Brooklyn," story by Arthur Stander, with Orson Welles, Ray Collins, Glenn Anders; Extant
12	December 7, 1941	"Symptoms of Being 35," story by Ring Lardner, with Joseph Cotten "Leaves of Grass," selected poetry by Walt Whitman read by Orson Welles; Extant
13	December 22, 1941	Luke, chapter 2 (The Nativity) read by Orson Welles "The Happy Prince," story by Oscar Wilde, with Orson Welles, Ray Collins, Agnes Moorehead, Joseph Cotten, Edgar Barrier, Erskine Sanford, Gus Schilling, Tim Holt; Christmas poem by G. K. Chesterton read by Orson Welles; Extant
14	December 29, 1941	There Are Frenchmen and Frenchmen, story by Richard Connell adapted by Joseph Cotten; Cast: Rita Hayworth, Orson Welles, Lurene Tuttle, Joseph Cotten; Extant
15	January 5, 1942	The Garden of Allah, adapted from the novel by Robert Hichens; Guest stars: Merle Oberon, Cedric Hardwicke; Extant
16	January 12, 1942	The Apple Tree, adapted from the story by John Galsworthy; Cast: Orson Welles (Frank), Geraldine Fitzgerald (Megan), Ray Collins (Phil); Extant
17	January 19, 1942	My Little Boy, story by Carl Ewald; Cast: Dix Davis, Orson Welles, Ruth Warrick, Ray Collins, Barbara Jean Wong; Extant
18	January 26, 1942	The Happy Hypocrite, story by Max Beerbohm; Cast: Orson Welles (narrator), John Barrymore, Maureen O'Sullivan, Agnes Moorehead, Eustace Wyatt, Everett Sloane; Incomplete
19	February 2, 1942	Between Americans, story by Norman Corwin; Incomplete
