= Lucille Fletcher =

American dramatist (1912–2000)

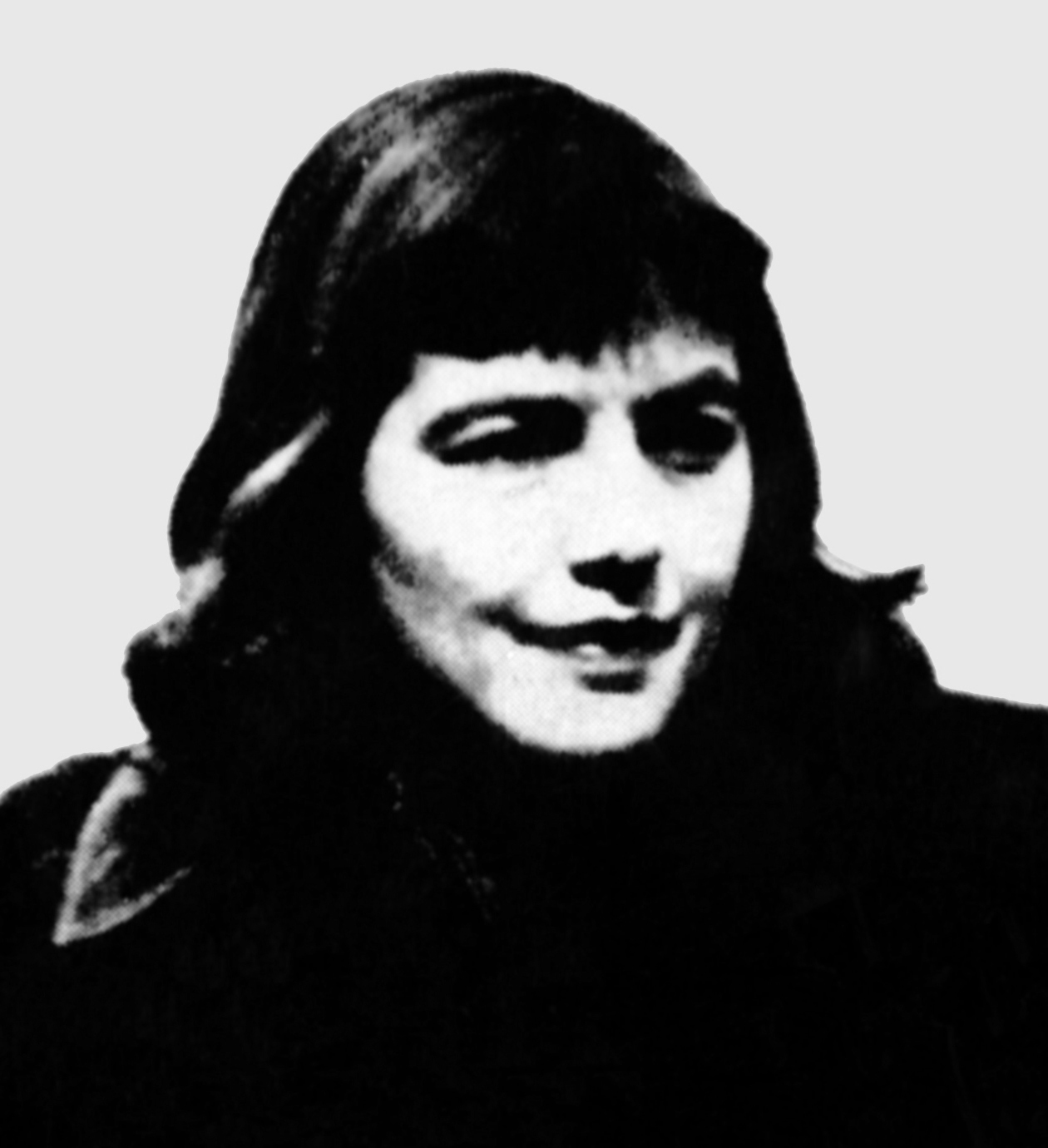
- Fletcher in 1963
- Born: Violet Lucille Fletcher; March 28, 1912; New York City, U.S.
- Died: August 31, 2000 (aged 88); Langhorne, Pennsylvania, U.S.
- Education: Vassar College
- Occupation: Writer
- Known for: The Hitch-Hiker; Sorry, Wrong Number
- Spouses: Bernard Herrmann (m. 1939; div. 1948) John Douglass Wallop III (m. 1949; died 1985)
- Children: 2

Violet Lucille Fletcher (March 28, 1912 – August 31, 2000) was an American screenwriter of film, radio and television. Her credits include The Hitch-Hiker, an original radio play written for Orson Welles and adapted for a notable episode of The Twilight Zone television series. Lucille Fletcher also wrote Sorry, Wrong Number, one of the most celebrated plays in the history of American radio, which she adapted and expanded for the 1948 film noir classic of the same name. Married to composer Bernard Herrmann in 1939, she wrote the libretto for his opera Wuthering Heights, which he began in 1943 and completed in 1951, after their divorce.

== Biography ==
=== Early life ===
Violet Lucille Fletcher was born March 28, 1912, in Brooklyn, New York. Her parents were Matthew Emerson Fletcher, a marine draftsman for the Standard Ship Company (a subsidiary of the Standard Oil Company of New Jersey), and Violet (Anderson) Fletcher.

After attending Public School 164 and the Maxwell Training School, Fletcher went to Bay Ridge High School and became president of the Arista honor society and editor of the school magazine. At age 17, she was declared the champion student orator at the regional competition of the National Oratorical Contest on the Constitution of the United States, sponsored by The New York Times at The Town Hall May 17, 1929. The only female finalist in the New York zone, Fletcher received an all-expenses paid trip to South America, a gold medal, a cash prize of $1,000 and an opportunity to compete for the national championship. Fletcher placed third in the national competition May 25, 1929, judged by five justices of the United States Supreme Court, with an address titled, "The Constitution: A Guarantee of the Personal Liberty of the Individual."

Fletcher attended Vassar College, where she earned a Bachelor of Arts degree with honors in 1933.

=== Career ===
From 1934 to 1939, Lucille Fletcher worked as a music librarian, copyright clerk and publicity writer at CBS. There she met her future husband, composer Bernard Herrmann, who conducted the CBS orchestra. The couple dated for five years, but delayed marriage due to her parents' objections. They finally married on October 2, 1939.

Fletcher's first success came when one of her magazine stories, "My Client Curley", was adapted for radio by Norman Corwin. Broadcast on the Columbia Workshop March 7, 1940, it was later adapted for the 1944 Cary Grant film, Once Upon a Time.

Herrmann wrote the score for the November 17, 1941, radio debut of Fletcher's famous story, The Hitch-Hiker on The Orson Welles Show.

Fletcher's greatest success, Sorry, Wrong Number, premiered on May 25, 1943, as an episode of the radio series Suspense. Agnes Moorehead created the role in the first performance and again in several later radio productions. It was broadcast nationwide seven times between 1943 and 1948. Fletcher's daughter Dorothy Herrmann told The New York Times that Fletcher got the idea for Sorry, Wrong Number when she was buying food for her sick child at a local grocery on Manhattan's East Side, and a well-dressed woman with an obnoxious manner refused to allow Fletcher to go ahead of her in line. Herrmann described the drama as an "act of revenge".

Barbara Stanwyck starred in the 1948 film version of Sorry, Wrong Number. A 1959 version produced for the CBS radio series Suspense received a 1960 Edgar Award for Best Radio Drama. Two operas were based on the play, which Orson Welles called "the greatest single radio script ever written".

Fletcher adapted the first part of the Emily Brontë novel Wuthering Heights into a libretto for Bernard Herrmann's opera of the same name, conceived in 1943. He completed the opera in June 1951, by which time they had divorced. Fletcher said the opera was "perhaps the closest to his talent and heart". The work was never produced on stage during Herrmann's lifetime.

Fletcher is interviewed in the 1992 documentary, Music for the Movies: Bernard Herrmann, which was nominated for an Academy Award.

=== Personal life ===
Lucille Fletcher and Bernard Herrmann had two daughters, Wendy and Dorothy. The couple divorced in 1948, over his affair with her cousin, Kathy Lucille (Lucy) Anderson. Anderson and Herrmann were married the following year.

Fletcher married Douglass Wallop, a writer, on January 6, 1949. They remained married until his death in 1985.

Fletcher died of a stroke on August 31, 2000.

== Works ==
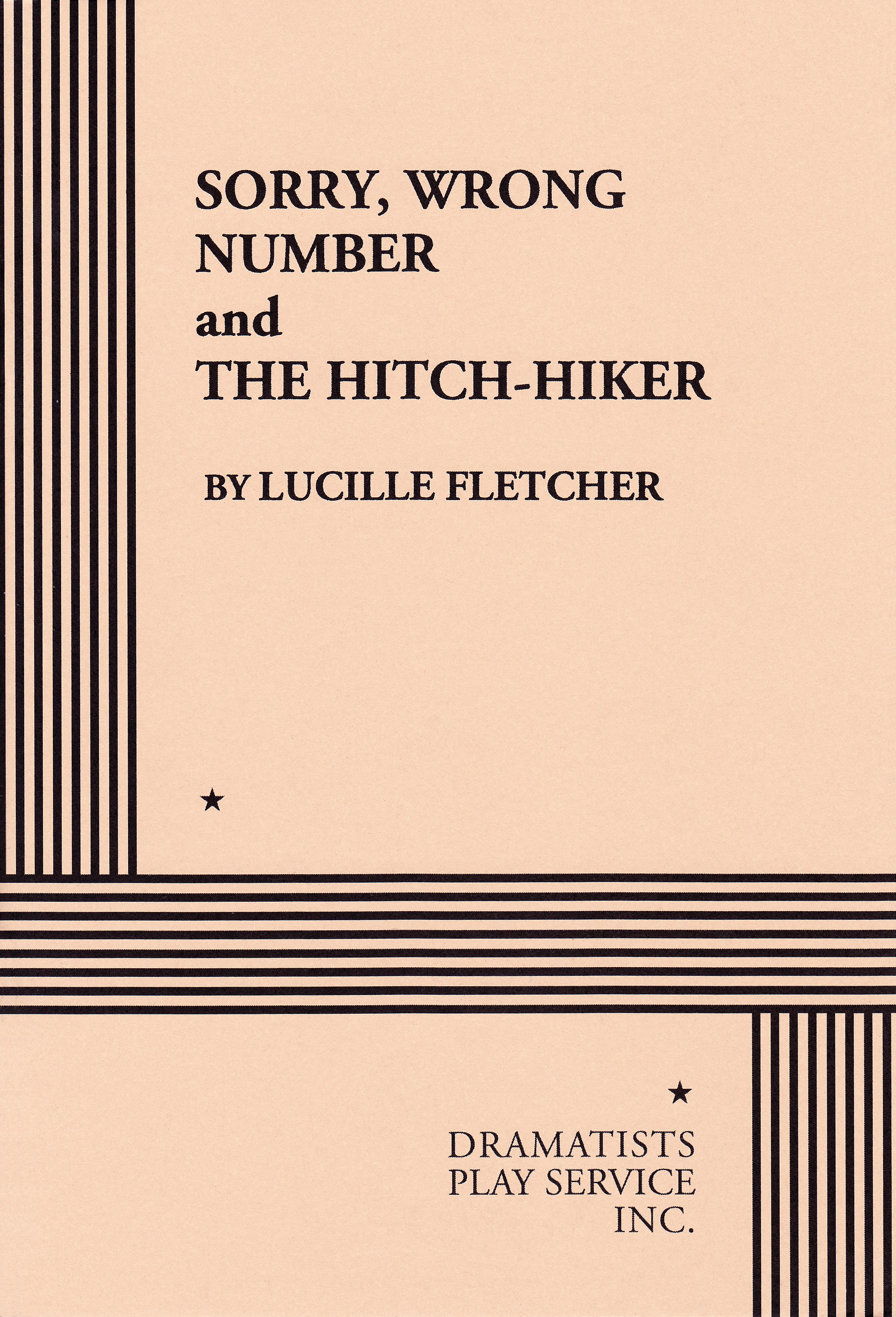
Sorry, Wrong Number and The Hitch-Hiker, first published by Dramatists Play Service in 1952

=== Radio plays ===
- My Client Curly. WHP-CBS, March 7, 1940
- The Man with the One Track Mind. Columbia Workshop, June 30, 1940.
- Carmilla. Columbia Workshop, July 28, 1940.
- Alf, The All-American Fly. Columbia Workshop, September 1, 1940.
- The Hitch-Hiker. The Orson Welles Show, November 17, 1941.
- Someone Else. Columbia Workshop, July 20, 1942.
- Remodeled Brownstone. Columbia Workshop, October 19, 1942.
- Gremlins. Ceiling Unlimited, December 21, 1942.
- The Diary of Saphronia Winters. Suspense, April 27, 1943.
- Sorry, Wrong Number. Suspense, May 25, 1943.
- Fugue in C Minor. Suspense, June 1, 1944.
- The Search for Henri Le Fevre. Suspense, July 6, 1944.
- Night Man. Suspense, October 26, 1944.
- The Furnished Floor. Suspense, September 13, 1945.
- Dark Journey. Suspense, April 25, 1946.
- The Thing in the Window. Suspense, December 19, 1946.
- Bela Boczniak's Bad Dreams. The Clock, April 25, 1948.

=== Novels ===
- Sorry, Wrong Number: A Novelization, with Allan Ullman. New York: Random House, 1948. OCLC 2312888
- Night Man, with Allan Ullman. New York: Random House, 1951. OCLC 1387009
- The Daughters of Jasper Clay. New York: Holt, 1958. OCLC 1442341
- Blindfold. New York: Random House, 1960. OCLC 1807238
- And Presumed Dead. New York: Random House, 1963. OCLC 1439426
- The Strange Blue Yawl. New York: Random House, 1964. OCLC 1416360
- The Girl in Cabin B54. New York: Random House, 1968. ISBN 9780340108086
- Night Watch. New York: Random House, 1972. ISBN 9780394482583
- Eighty Dollars to Stamford. New York: Random House, 1975. ISBN 9780394475448
- Mirror Image. New York: W. Morrow and Co, 1988. ISBN 9780688077495

=== Plays ===
- Sorry, Wrong Number, and The Hitch-Hiker; Plays in One Act. [New York]: Dramatists Play Service, 1952. ISBN 978-0-8222-1059-7
- Night Watch; A Play of Suspense in Two Acts. [New York]: Dramatists Play Service, 1972. ISBN 9780822208266. This play was the basis for the film Night Watch (1973 film).

=== Librettos ===
- Wuthering Heights; Opera in 4 Acts and a Prologue, with Bernard Herrmann. London: Novello, 1965. OCLC 13572509

== Awards ==
Sorry, Wrong Number received the Edgar Allan Poe Award from the Mystery Writers of America.
