= Logic discography =

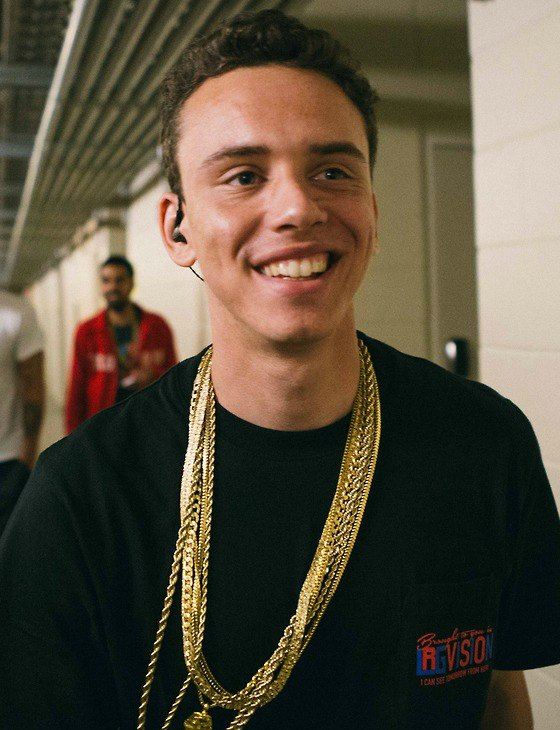
- Logic at the Verge Campus Tour in 2014
- Studio albums: 10
- EPs: 3
- Soundtrack albums: 2
- Compilation albums: 1
- Singles: 66
- Music videos: 42
- Collaborative albums: 1
- Mixtapes: 10
- Promotional singles: 3
- Beat tapes: 5

American rapper Logic has released ten studio albums, three EPs, two collaborative album, one compilation album, one soundtrack album, ten mixtapes, five beat tapes, 66 singles (including 23 singles as a featured artist), three promotional singles and 42 music videos. In December 2010, Logic released his debut mixtape, Young, Broke & Infamous.

Logic released his second mixtape, Young Sinatra, in September 2011, which included the song, "All I Do". He later released the mixtapes, Young Sinatra: Undeniable, in April 2012 and Young Sinatra: Welcome to Forever, in May 2013.

Logic went on to release his debut studio album, Under Pressure, on October 21, 2014, to generally favorable reviews from music critics. The album debuted at number four on the US Billboard 200 chart. The album spawned two singles: The title track and "Buried Alive".

His second studio album, The Incredible True Story, was released in November 2015 and debuted at number three on the US Billboard 200 chart and at number one on the Top R&B/Hip-Hop Albums chart. The album included the singles: "Young Jesus", "Like Woah" and "Fade Away". He was later featured on the song, "Sucker for Pain" for the Suicide Squad soundtrack, peaking at number 15 on the Billboard Hot 100 chart. He later released the mixtape, Bobby Tarantino, in July 2016 and included the singles: "Flexicution" and "Wrist".

Logic's third studio album, Everybody, was released in May 2017 and debuted at number one in the US, becoming his first album to reach the top of the Billboard 200 with 247,000 album-equivalent units, of which 196,000 were pure album sales. The album spawned three singles: The title track, "Black Spiderman", and "1-800-273-8255", with the latter single peaking in the top ten in various countries and later became certified platinum 8x by the Recording Industry Association of America (RIAA). Following the release of the album, Logic released the mixtape, Bobby Tarantino II, in March 2018. It debuted at number one in the US, becoming his second consecutive number-one album in the US and included the singles: "44 More", "Overnight" and "Everyday".

His fourth studio album, YSIV, was released in September 2018 and debuted at number two on the US Billboard 200 chart. He released Supermarket, the soundtrack to his novel of the same name in March 2019.

His fifth studio album, Confessions of a Dangerous Mind, was released two months later in May and debuted at number one in the US, making it his third album to reach the top of the chart. The album included the singles "Keanu Reeves", the title track, and "Homicide", with the latter single featuring a verse by Eminem and peaking in the top ten in various countries.

Logic's sixth studio album, No Pressure, was released on July 24, 2020, to generally favorable reviews from music critics. The album debuted at number two on the US Billboard 200 with 221,000 album-equivalent units, of which 172,000 were pure album sales. Additionally, Logic announced that after the release of the album, he would officially be retiring from music.

The following year, Logic came out of retirement, and released a single, “Intro”, on June 18, 2021, leading fans to speculate that a new project was in development. The ensuing week, he would release a compilation album, The Y.S. Collection Vol. 1, featuring songs from his first three Young Sinatra tapes. Logic’s seventh mixtape, Bobby Tarantino 3, released on July 30, 2021. The album received mostly positive feedback from critics.

Logic's seventh studio album, Vinyl Days, was released on June 17, 2022. The album is Logic's final to be released via his longtime deal with Def Jam Recordings. Critics responded with generally positive reviews to the album. Vinyl Days featured skits starring several celebrities including Morgan Freeman, J.J. Abrams, Nardwuar, Tony Revolori, and Anthony Fantano.

Logic's eighth studio album, College Park, was released on February 24, 2023. The album title refers to the Maryland town where Logic began writing his first songs. The story/skits of the album are reminiscent of his early career. In January 2024, Logic confirmed the release of his long awaited ninth studio album, Ultra 85; this title had been referenced on the closing track of No Pressure. The announcement was accompanied by the official artwork and five single called "Fear", "44 Ever", "Mission Control" with T Man the Wizard, "Deja Vu" featuring DJ Drama and "Teleport" .

== Albums ==
=== Studio albums ===
List of studio albums, with selected details, chart positions and certifications
Title	Album details	Peak chart positions										Certifications
Title	Album details	US	US R&B /HH	US Rap	AUS	BEL (FL)	CAN	GER	NZ	SWE	UK	Certifications
Under Pressure	Released: October 21, 2014; Labels: Visionary, Def Jam; Format: CD, LP, digital download	4	2	2	79	173	8	—	26	—	88	RIAA: Platinum; BPI: Silver
The Incredible True Story	Released: November 13, 2015; Labels: Visionary, Def Jam; Format: CD, LP, digital download	3	1	1	43	105	7	—	27	—	47	RIAA: Platinum
Everybody	Released: May 5, 2017; Labels: Visionary, Def Jam; Format: CD, LP, cassette, digital download	1	1	1	25	63	4	—	14	12	20	RIAA: Platinum; IFPI DEN: Gold
YSIV	Released: September 28, 2018; Labels: Visionary, Def Jam; Format: CD, LP, cassette, digital download	2	2	2	8	38	4	—	13	24	19	
Confessions of a Dangerous Mind	Released: May 10, 2019; Labels: Visionary, Def Jam; Format: CD, LP, cassette, digital download	1	1	1	12	29	2	76	14	24	12	RIAA: Gold
No Pressure	Released: July 24, 2020; Label: Visionary, Def Jam; Format: CD, LP, cassette, digital download	2	1	1	14	27	4	82	9	28	11	
Vinyl Days	Released: June 17, 2022; Label: Visionary, Def Jam; Format: CD, LP, cassette, digital download	12	6	4	—	—	30	—	—	—	—	
College Park	Released: February 24, 2023; Label: BobbyBoy, Three Oh One Productions, BMG; Format: CD, LP, cassette, digital download	21	12	7	—	—	61	—	—	—	—	
Ultra 85	Released: August 9, 2024; Label: BobbyBoy, Three Oh One Productions, BMG; Format: CD, LP, cassette, digital download	45	13	11	—	—	—	—	—	—	—	
"—" denotes a recording that did not chart or was not released in that territory.

=== Collaborative albums ===
List of collaborative albums
Title	Album details
Live and in Color (with Juicy J)	Released: June 13, 2025; Label: Trippy Music; Format: Streaming, digital download

=== Compilation albums ===
List of compilation albums, with selected details and chart positions
Title	Album details	Peak chart positions		
Title	Album details	US	US R&B /HH	CAN
YS Collection Vol. 1	Released: June 25, 2021; Label: Visionary, Def Jam; Formats: Digital download, streaming	56	32	62

=== Soundtracks ===
List of soundtrack albums, with selected details and chart positions
Title	Album details	Peak chart positions			
Title	Album details	US	US Alt	US Rock	CAN
Supermarket	Released: March 26, 2019; Labels: Visionary, Def Jam; Format: LP, digital download	56	6	11	82

== Extended plays ==
List of extended plays
Title	EP details
3P (with C Dot Castro)	Released: April 11, 2023; Label: BobbyBoy, Three Oh One Productions, BMG; Format: Streaming
Aquarius III	Released: January 17, 2025; Label: BobbyBoy, Three Oh One Productions, BMG; Format: Streaming

== Mixtapes ==
List of mixtapes, with selected details, chart positions and certifications
Title	Mixtape details	Peak chart positions										Certifications
Title	Mixtape details	US	US R&B /HH	US Rap	AUS	BEL (FL)	CAN	GER	NZ	SWE	UK	Certifications
Psychological: The Mixtape (as Psychological)	Released: December 24, 2009; Formats: CD	—	—	—	—	—	—	—	—	—	—	
Young, Broke & Infamous	Released: December 15, 2010; Formats: Digital download	—	—	—	—	—	—	—	—	—	—	
Young Sinatra	Released: September 19, 2011; Formats: Digital download	—	—	—	—	—	—	—	—	—	—	
Young Sinatra: Undeniable	Released: April 30, 2012; Formats: Digital download	—	—	—	—	—	—	—	—	—	—	
Young Sinatra: Welcome to Forever	Released: May 7, 2013; Formats: Digital download	—	—	—	—	—	—	—	—	—	—	
Bobby Tarantino	Released: July 1, 2016; Formats: Digital download, LP	12	2	2	—	—	50	—	— (Note: "Bobby Tarantino" did not enter the NZ Top 40 Album Chart, but peaked at number one on the NZ Heatseekers Albums Chart.)	—	—	RIAA: Gold
Bobby Tarantino II	Released: March 9, 2018; Formats: Digital download, LP	1	1	1	10	27	1	39	5	3	13	RIAA: Gold
Planetory Destruction (as Doctor Destruction)	Released: January 22, 2021; Formats: Digital download	—	—	—	—	—	—	—	—	—	—	
Bobby Tarantino III	Released: July 30, 2021; Formats: Digital download, LP, CD	26	16	13	51	146	36	—	37	—	91	
Inglorious Basterd	Released: September 18, 2023; Formats: Digital download	—	—	—	—	—	—	—	—	—	—	
"—" denotes a recording that did not chart or was not released in that territory.

== Beat tapes ==
List of beat tapes
Title	Album details
Twitch Tape Vol.1	Released: September 11, 2020; Format: Digital download
Peanuts (as Peanuts)	Released: August 31, 2022; Format: Digital download
Loopin the 1st (as Peanuts)	Released: November 21, 2022; Format: Digital download
Fantastic Beats and Where To Find Them (as Peanuts)	Released: December 31, 2022; Format: Digital download
Picnic (as Peanuts)	Released: January 26, 2023; Format: Digital download
Loopin the 2nd (as Peanuts)	Released: March 15, 2023; Format: Digital download
Super Microphonus (as Peanuts)	Released: December 21, 2023; Format: Digital download
Loopin the 3rd (as Peanuts)	Released: May 14, 2024; Format: Digital download
Gold Chain (as Peanuts)	Released: August 1, 2024; Format: Digital download

== Singles ==
=== As lead artist ===
List of singles as lead artist, with selected chart positions and certifications, year released and album name shown
Title	Year	Peak chart positions										Certifications	Album
Title	Year	US	US R&B /HH	US Rap	AUS	BEL (WA)	CAN	GER	NZ	SWE	UK	Certifications	Album
"Under Pressure"	2014	—	— (Note: "Under Pressure" did not enter the Billboard Hot R&B/Hip-Hop Songs chart, but peaked at number five on the Bubbling Under R&B/Hip-Hop Singles chart.)	—	—	—	—	—	—	—	—	RIAA: Gold	Under Pressure
"Buried Alive"	2014	—	—	—	—	—	—	—	—	—	—	RIAA: Gold	Under Pressure
"Young Jesus" (featuring Big Lenbo)	2015	—	—	—	—	—	—	—	—	—	—	RIAA: Gold	The Incredible True Story
"Like Woah"	2015	—	— (Note: "Like Woah" did not enter the Billboard Hot R&B/Hip-Hop Songs chart, but peaked at number three on the Bubbling Under R&B/Hip-Hop Singles chart.)	—	—	—	—	—	—	—	—	RIAA: Gold	The Incredible True Story
"Fade Away"	2015	— (Note: "Fade Away" did not enter the Billboard Hot 100, but peaked at number 25 on the Bubbling Under Hot 100 Singles chart.)	44	—	—	—	—	—	—	—	—	RIAA: Platinum	The Incredible True Story
"Flexicution"	2016	100	33	—	—	—	—	—	—	—	—	RIAA: Platinum; RMNZ: Gold	Bobby Tarantino
"Wrist" (featuring Pusha T)	2016	— (Note: "Wrist" did not enter the Billboard Hot 100, but peaked at number twenty on the Bubbling Under Hot 100 Singles chart, which acts as an extension to the Hot 100.)	44	—	—	—	—	—	—	—	—	RIAA: Gold	Bobby Tarantino
"Sucker for Pain" (with Lil Wayne, Wiz Khalifa, Imagine Dragons and Ty Dolla Sign featuring X Ambassadors)	2016	15	3	1	7	35	19	8	5	9	11	RIAA: 3× Platinum; ARIA: Platinum; BPI: Platinum; BVMI: Platinum; FIMI: 2× Platinum; RMNZ: Gold; SNEP: Platinum	Suicide Squad: The Album
"Everybody"	2017	59	27	18	—	—	59	—	— (Note: "Everybody" did not enter the NZ Top 40 Singles Chart, but peaked at number four on the NZ Heatseeker Singles Chart.)	—	—	RIAA: 2× Platinum; RMNZ: Gold	Everybody
"Black Spiderman" (featuring Damian Lemar Hudson)	2017	87	46	—	—	—	80	—	— (Note: "Black Spiderman" did not enter the NZ Top 40 Singles Chart, but peaked at number eight on the NZ Heatseeker Singles Chart.)	—	—	RIAA: Platinum	Everybody
"1-800-273-8255" (featuring Alessia Cara and Khalid)	2017	3	2	2	5	17	6	45	6	4	9	RIAA: 8× Platinum; ARIA: 3× Platinum; BEA: Gold; BPI: 2× Platinum; BVMI: Gold; FIMI: Platinum; IFPI DEN: Platinum; MC: 5× Platinum; RMNZ: 5× Platinum; SNEP: Gold	Everybody
"Broken People" (with Rag'n'Bone Man)	2017	—	—	—	—	— (Note: "Broken People" did not enter the Ultratop 50, but peaked at number one on the Wallonie Ultratip chart.)	—	—	— (Note: "Broken People" did not enter the NZ Top 40 Singles Chart, but peaked at number seven on the NZ Heatseeker Singles Chart.)	—	—		Bright: The Album
"44 More"	2018	22	13	10	85	—	33	—	— (Note: "44 More" did not enter the NZ Top 40 Singles Chart, but peaked at number two on the NZ Heatseeker Singles Chart.)	— (Note: "44 More" did not enter the Swedish Singles Chart, but peaked at number one on the Swedish Heatseeker chart.)	75	RIAA: Platinum; MC: Gold; RMNZ: Gold	Bobby Tarantino II
"Overnight"	2018	68	32	—	—	—	61	—	—	—	—	RIAA: Gold	Bobby Tarantino II
"Everyday" (with Marshmello)	2018	29	16	13	38	—	15	48	36	34	46	RIAA: 2× Platinum; BPI: Silver; BVMI: Gold; IFPI DEN: Gold; MC: Platinum; RMNZ: Platinum	Bobby Tarantino II
"One Day" (featuring Ryan Tedder)	2018	80	31	23	—	—	92	87	—	— (Note: "One Day" did not enter the Swedish Singellista Chart, but peaked at number eight on the Swedish Heatseeker Chart.)	99		YSIV
"The Return"	2018	— (Note: "The Return" did not enter the Billboard Hot 100, but peaked at number 11 on the Bubbling Under Hot 100 Singles chart.)	— (Note: "The Return" did not enter the Billboard Hot R&B/Hip-Hop Songs chart, but peaked at number one on the Bubbling Under R&B/Hip-Hop Singles chart.)	—	—	—	—	—	— (Note: "The Return" did not enter the NZ Top 40 Singles Chart, but peaked at number 16 on the NZ Hot Singles Chart.)	—	—		YSIV
"Everybody Dies"	2018	— (Note: "Everybody Dies" did not enter the Billboard Hot 100, but peaked at number 22 on the Bubbling Under Hot 100 Singles chart.)	— (Note: "Everybody Dies" did not enter the Billboard Hot R&B/Hip-Hop Songs chart, but peaked at number nine on the Bubbling Under R&B/Hip-Hop Singles chart.)	—	—	—	—	—	— (Note: "Everybody Dies" did not enter the NZ Top 40 Singles Chart, but peaked at number 37 on the NZ Hot Singles Chart.)	—	—		YSIV
"Keanu Reeves"	2019	38	18	15	92	—	34	—	— (Note: "Keanu Reeves" did not enter the NZ Top 40 Singles Chart, but peaked at number six on the NZ Hot Singles Chart.)	— (Note: "Keanu Reeves" did not enter the Swedish Singellista Chart, but peaked at number seven on the Swedish Heatseeker Chart.)	86	RIAA: Platinum; RMNZ: Gold	Confessions of a Dangerous Mind
"Confessions of a Dangerous Mind"	2019	78	31	—	—	—	69	—	— (Note: "Confessions of a Dangerous Mind" did not enter the NZ Top 40 Singles Chart, but peaked at number six on the NZ Hot Singles Chart.)	—	—	RIAA: Gold	Confessions of a Dangerous Mind
"Homicide" (featuring Eminem)	2019	5	2	2	6	28	5	38	4	14	15	RIAA: 2× Platinum; BPI: Gold; RMNZ: Platinum	Confessions of a Dangerous Mind
"OCD" (with Dwn2earth)	2019	—	—	—	—	—	—	—	—	—	—		Non-album single
"Perfect"	2020	95	38	—	—	—	75	—	—	—	—	RIAA: Gold	No Pressure
"Intro"	2021	—	—	—	—	—	—	—	— (Note: "Intro" did not enter the NZ Top 40 Singles Chart, but peaked at number 38 on the NZ Hot Singles Chart.)	—	—		Non-album single
"Vaccine"	2021	—	—	—	—	—	—	—	— (Note: "Vaccine" did not enter the NZ Top 40 Singles Chart, but peaked at number 23 on the NZ Hot Singles Chart.)	—	—		Bobby Tarantino III
"Get Up"	2021	—	—	—	—	—	—	—	—	—	—		Bobby Tarantino III
"My Way"	2021	—	—	—	—	—	—	—	—	—	—		Bobby Tarantino III
"Call Me"	2021	—	—	—	—	—	—	—	—	—	—		Bobby Tarantino III
"Decades"	2022	—	—	—	—	—	—	—	—	—	—		Vinyl Days
"Tetris"	2022	—	—	—	—	—	—	—	—	—	—		Vinyl Days
"Therapy Music" (featuring Russ)	2022	—	—	—	—	—	—	—	— (Note: "Therapy Music" did not enter the NZ Top 40 Singles Chart, but peaked at number 20 on the NZ Hot Singles Chart.)	—	—		Vinyl Days
"Vinyl Days" (featuring DJ Premier)	2022	—	—	—	—	—	—	—	—	—	—		Vinyl Days
"Orville" (featuring Like, Blu and Exile)	2022	—	—	—	—	—	—	—	—	—	—		Vinyl Days
"Bleed It"	2022	—	—	—	—	—	—	—	—	—	—		Vinyl Days
"Breath Control" (featuring Wiz Khalifa)	2022	—	—	—	—	—	—	—	—	—	—		Vinyl Days
"Wake Up" (featuring Lucy Rose)	2023	—	—	—	—	—	—	—	— (Note: "Wake Up" did not enter the NZ Top 40 Singles Chart, but peaked at number 36 on the NZ Hot Singles Chart.)	—	—		College Park
"Highlife"	2023	—	—	—	—	—	—	—	—	—	—		College Park
"Paradise II" (Single version) (featuring Norah Jones)	2023	—	—	—	—	—	—	—	—	—	—		College Park
"Lightsabers"	2023	—	—	—	—	—	—	—	—	—	—		College Park
"Juice II"	2023	—	—	—	—	—	—	—	—	—	—		Non-album singles
"Figure It Out"	2023	—	—	—	—	—	—	—	—	—	—		Non-album singles
"Check Please" (featuring C Dot Castro and T Man the Wizard)	2023	—	—	—	—	—	—	—	—	—	—		Non-album singles
"Noell"	2023	—	—	—	—	—	—	—	—	—	—		Non-album singles
"Fear" (Single version)	2024	—	—	—	—	—	—	—	—	—	—		Ultra 85
"44ever"	2024	—	—	—	—	—	—	—	— (Note: "44ever" did not enter the NZ Top 40 Singles Chart, but peaked at number 26 on the NZ Hot Singles Chart.)	—	—		Ultra 85
"Deja Vu" (featuring DJ Drama)	2024	—	—	—	—	—	—	—	—	—	—		Ultra 85
"Mission Control" (featuring T Man the Wizard)	2024	—	—	—	—	—	—	—	—	—	—		Ultra 85
"Teleport"	2024	—	—	—	—	—	—	—	—	—	—		Ultra 85
"Pipeline" (with Oddisee)	2025	—	—	—	—	—	—	—	—	—	—		Non-album single
"It's A Fee"	2025	—	—	—	—	—	—	—	—	—	—		Sidequest
"Everyone's Dead Already" (with Whethan and T Man the Wizard)	2025	—	—	—	—	—	—	—	—	—	—		Sidequest
"Sold Out"	2025	—	—	—	—	—	—	—	—	—	—		Sidequest
"Catch Me If You Can"	2025	—	—	—	—	—	—	—	—	—	—		Non-album single
"Go Round"	2025	—	—	—	—	—	—	—	—	—	—		Sidequest
"Bad Motherfucker"	2025	—	—	—	—	—	—	—	—	—	—		Non-album singles
"Old Logic"	2025	—	—	—	—	—	—	—	—	—	—		Non-album singles
"Bleed"	2025	—	—	—	—	—	—	—	—	—	—		Sidequest
"The Adventures of Cocaine Larry"	2025	—	—	—	—	—	—	—	—	—	—		Non-album single
"Severed Ties"	2025	—	—	—	—	—	—	—	—	—	—		Sidequest
"FOMO"	2025	—	—	—	—	—	—	—	—	—	—		Non-album single
"Right To Be"	2025	—	—	—	—	—	—	—	—	—	—		Sidequest
"Witness"	2025	—	—	—	—	—	—	—	—	—	—		Sidequest
"Nobody Safe"	2025	—	—	—	—	—	—	—	—	—	—		Sidequest
"My Demons"	2025	—	—	—	—	—	—	—	—	—	—		Sidequest
"700 Club"	2025	—	—	—	—	—	—	—	—	—	—		Non-album single
"The Ballad of Rooster Jenkins"	2025	—	—	—	—	—	—	—	—	—	—		Paradise Records
"It's All Your Fault"	2026	—	—	—	—	—	—	—	—	—	—		Paradise Records
"—" denotes a recording that did not chart or was not released in that territory.

=== As featured artist ===
List of singles as featured artist, with selected chart positions and certifications, showing year released and album name
Title	Year	Peak chart positions										Certifications	Album
Title	Year	US	US R&B /HH	US Rap	AUS	CAN	IRL	NZ	SCO	SWI	UK	Certifications	Album
"Feels Right" (Yonas featuring Logic)	2012	—	—	—	—	—	—	—	—	—	—		The Transition
"I Got This" (Tyler Thomas featuring Logic and Vic Mensa) (Note: The version with Vic Mensa was released in 2016.)	2013	—	—	—	—	—	—	—	—	—	—		Higher Learning
"20/20" (Lungz featuring Logic)	2013	—	—	—	—	—	—	—	—	—	—		Inebriation
"Willing to Die" (Gin Wigmore featuring Suffa and Logic)	2015	—	—	—	88	—	—	—	—	—	—		Blood to Bone
"All of Me" (Big Gigantic featuring Logic and Rozes)	2016	—	—	—	—	—	—	—	—	—	—	RIAA: Gold	Brighter Future
"Sriracha" (Tech N9ne featuring Logic and Joyner Lucas)	2016	—	—	—	—	—	—	—	—	—	—		The Storm
"Home" (Remix) (Snoh Aalegra featuring Logic)	2017	—	—	—	—	—	—	—	—	—	—		Non-album singles
"You Can Count On Me" (Ansel Elgort featuring Logic)	2017	—	—	—	—	—	—	—	—	—	—		Non-album singles
"Sometimes" (Snoh Aalegra featuring Logic)	2017	—	—	—	—	—	—	—	—	—	—		Feels
"The Feeling" (John Lindahl featuring Logic)	2017	—	—	—	—	—	—	—	—	—	—		Changes
"Pray" (Sam Smith featuring Logic)	2018	55	—	—	—	—	—	—	—	—	—	RMNZ: Platinum	The Thrill of It All
"Start Again" (OneRepublic featuring Logic)	2018	—	—	—	67	94	52	— (Note: "Start Again" did not enter the NZ Top 40 Singles Chart, but peaked at number ten on the NZ Heatseeker Singles Chart.)	—	53	—	ARIA: Gold	13 Reasons Why: Season 2
"ISIS" (Joyner Lucas featuring Logic)	2019	59	24	22	41	39	26	28	53	62	42	RIAA: Platinum; ARIA: Gold; BPI: Silver; RMNZ: Platinum	ADHD
"These Days" (Silas featuring Logic)	2019	—	—	—	—	—	—	—	—	—	—		1998
"Fun Up Here" (Mike Posner featuring Logic)	2019	—	—	—	—	—	—	—	—	—	—		Keep Going
"Twisted" (French Montana featuring Juicy J, Logic and ASAP Rocky)	2019	—	—	—	—	—	—	—	—	—	—		Montana
"A Letter to My Younger Self" (Quinn XCII featuring Logic)	2020	—	—	—	—	—	—	—	—	—	—		A Letter to My Younger Self
"Fade Away" (Norah Jones featuring Logic)	2022	—	—	—	—	—	—	—	—	—	—		Non-album singles
"Sweeter Scars" (Just Juice featuring Trippie Redd and Logic)	2023	—	—	—	—	—	—	—	—	—	—		Non-album singles
"My Own Lane" (Langston Bristol featuring Logic)	2023	—	—	—	—	—	—	—	—	—	—		Non-album singles
"81" (Travis Thompson featuring Jake One and Logic)	2023	—	—	—	—	—	—	—	—	—	—		Non-album singles
"—" denotes a recording that did not chart or was not released in that territory.

=== Promotional singles ===
List of promotional singles, with selected chart positions and certifications, showing year released and album name
Title	Year	Peak chart positions	Certifications	Album
Title	Year	US R&B/HH Bub.	Certifications	Album
"Now"	2014	—		Under Pressure
"Alright" (featuring Big Sean)	2014	—	RIAA: Platinum	Under Pressure
"Driving Ms. Daisy" (featuring Childish Gambino)	2014	6		Under Pressure
"—" denotes a recording that did not chart or was not released in that territory.

== Other charted and certified songs ==
List of other charted songs, with selected chart positions and certifications, showing year released and album name
Title	Year	Peak chart positions							Certifications	Album
Title	Year	US	US R&B /HH	US Rock	CAN	NZ Hot	SWE Heat.	UK	Certifications	Album
"Gang Related"	2014	—	—	—	—	—	—	—	RIAA: Platinum; RMNZ: Gold	Under Pressure
"Nikki"	2014	—	—	—	—	—	—	—	RIAA: Gold	Under Pressure
"Till the End"	2014	—	—	—	—	—	—	—	RIAA: Gold	Under Pressure
"Soul Food"	2014	—	—	—	—	—	—	—	RIAA: Gold	Under Pressure
"I Am the Greatest"	2015	—	50	—	—	—	—	—	RIAA: Gold	The Incredible True Story
"Lord Willin'"	2015	—	— (Note: "Lord Willin'" did not enter the Billboard Hot R&B/Hip-Hop Songs chart, but peaked at number ten on the Bubbling Under R&B/Hip-Hop Singles chart.)	—	—	—	—	—	RIAA: Gold	The Incredible True Story
"Run It"	2015	—	—	—	—	—	—	—	RIAA: Gold	The Incredible True Story
"The Jam"	2016	—	— (Note: "The Jam" did not enter the Billboard Hot R&B/Hip-Hop Songs chart, but peaked at number seven on the Bubbling Under R&B/Hip-Hop Singles chart.)	—	—	—	—	—		Bobby Tarantino
"Super Mario World"	2016	—	— (Note: "Super Mario World" did not enter the Billboard Hot R&B/Hip-Hop Songs chart, but peaked at number eight on the Bubbling Under R&B/Hip-Hop Singles chart.)	—	—	—	—	—	RIAA: Gold	Bobby Tarantino
"44 Bars"	2016	—	— (Note: "44 Bars" did not enter the Billboard Hot R&B/Hip-Hop Songs chart, but peaked at number five on the Bubbling Under R&B/Hip-Hop Singles chart.)	—	—	—	—	—	RIAA: Gold; RMNZ: Gold	Bobby Tarantino
"Hallelujah"	2017	— (Note: "Hallelujah" did not enter the Billboard Hot 100, but peaked at number 14 on the Bubbling Under Hot 100 Singles chart.)	— (Note: "Hallelujah" did not enter the Billboard Hot R&B/Hip-Hop Songs chart, but peaked at number three on the Bubbling Under R&B/Hip-Hop Singles chart.)	—	—	—	—	—		Everybody
"Confess" (featuring Killer Mike)	2017	— (Note: "Confess" did not enter the Billboard Hot 100, but peaked at number 16 on the Bubbling Under Hot 100 Singles chart.)	— (Note: "Confess" did not enter the Billboard Hot R&B/Hip-Hop Songs chart, but peaked at number five on the Bubbling Under R&B/Hip-Hop Singles chart.)	—	—	—	—	—		Everybody
"Killing Spree" (featuring Ansel Elgort)	2017	— (Note: "Killing Spree" did not enter the Billboard Hot 100, but peaked at number four on the Bubbling Under Hot 100 Singles chart.)	48	—	—	— (Note: "Killing Spree" did not enter the NZ Top 40 Singles Chart or the Hot Singles Chart, but peaked at number eight on the NZ Hot Singles Chart.)	—	—		Everybody
"Take It Back"	2017	— (Note: "Take It Back" did not enter the Billboard Hot 100, but peaked at number seven on the Bubbling Under Hot 100 Singles chart.)	— (Note: "Take It Back" did not enter the Billboard Hot R&B/Hip-Hop Songs chart, but peaked at number one on the Bubbling Under R&B/Hip-Hop Singles chart.)	—	—	—	—	—	RIAA: Gold	Everybody
"America" (featuring Black Thought, Chuck D, Big Lenbo and No I.D.)	2017	— (Note: "America" did not enter the Billboard Hot 100, but peaked at number 24 on the Bubbling Under Hot 100 Singles chart.)	— (Note: "America" did not enter the Billboard Hot R&B/Hip-Hop Songs chart, but peaked at number eight on the Bubbling Under R&B/Hip-Hop Singles chart.)	—	—	—	—	—		Everybody
"Ink Blot" (featuring Juicy J)	2017	—	— (Note: "Ink Blot" did not enter the Billboard Hot R&B/Hip-Hop Songs chart, but peaked at number 10 on the Bubbling Under R&B/Hip-Hop Singles chart.)	—	—	—	—	—		Everybody
"Anziety" (featuring Lucy Rose)	2017	—	— (Note: "Anziety" did not enter the Billboard Hot R&B/Hip-Hop Songs chart, but peaked at number nine on the Bubbling Under R&B/Hip-Hop Singles chart.)	—	—	—	—	—		Everybody
"Grandpa's Space Ship"	2018	— (Note: "Grandpa's Space Ship" did not enter the Billboard Hot 100, but peaked at number 22 on the Bubbling Under Hot 100 Singles chart.)	— (Note: "Grandpa's Space Ship" did not enter the Billboard Hot R&B/Hip-Hop Songs chart, but peaked at number 10 on the Bubbling Under R&B/Hip-Hop Singles chart.)	—	—	—	—	—		Bobby Tarantino II
"Contra"	2018	60	28	—	71	— (Note: "Contra" did not enter the NZ Top 40 Singles Chart or the Hot Singles Chart, but peaked at number one on the NZ Hot Singles Chart.)	14	84	RIAA: Gold	Bobby Tarantino II
"Boomtrap Protocol"	2018	94	48	—	—	—	—	—		Bobby Tarantino II
"Yuck"	2018	87	42	—	96	—	—	—		Bobby Tarantino II
"Indica Badu" (featuring Wiz Khalifa)	2018	56	26	—	75	— (Note: "Indica Badu" did not enter the NZ Top 40 Singles Chart or the Hot Singles Chart, but peaked at number two on the NZ Hot Singles Chart.)	—	—	RIAA: Gold	Bobby Tarantino II
"Midnight"	2018	74	37	—	82	—	—	—	RIAA: Gold	Bobby Tarantino II
"Warm It Up" (featuring Young Sinatra)	2018	98	49	—	—	—	—	—		Bobby Tarantino II
"Wizard of Oz"	2018	— (Note: "Wizard of Oz" did not enter the Billboard Hot 100, but peaked at number three on the Bubbling Under Hot 100 Singles chart.)	— (Note: "Wizard of Oz" did not enter the Billboard Hot R&B/Hip-Hop Songs chart, but peaked at number one on the Bubbling Under R&B/Hip-Hop Singles chart.)	—	—	—	—	—		Bobby Tarantino II
"State of Emergency" (featuring 2 Chainz)	2018	— (Note: "State of Emergency" did not enter the Billboard Hot 100, but peaked at number four on the Bubbling Under Hot 100 Singles chart.)	— (Note: "State of Emergency" did not enter the Billboard Hot R&B/Hip-Hop Songs chart, but peaked at number two on the Bubbling Under R&B/Hip-Hop Singles chart.)	—	—	—	—	—		Bobby Tarantino II
"Wassup" (featuring Big Sean)	2018	83	40	—	90	—	—	—		Bobby Tarantino II
"Bennie and the Jets" (with Elton John and Pink)	2018	—	—	—	—	— (Note: "Bennie and the Jets" did not enter the NZ Top 40 Singles Chart or the Hot Singles Chart, but peaked at number seven on the NZ Hot Singles Chart.)	—	—		Revamp: Reimagining the Songs of Elton John & Bernie Taupin
"Wu Tang Forever" (featuring Ghostface Killah, Raekwon, RZA, Method Man, Inspectah Deck, Cappadonna, Jackpot Scotty Wotty, U-God, Masta Killa and GZA)	2018	— (Note: "Wu Tang Forever" did not enter the Billboard Hot 100, but peaked at number one on the Bubbling Under Hot 100 Singles chart.)	— (Note: "Wu Tang Forever" did not enter the Billboard Hot R&B/Hip-Hop Songs chart, but peaked at number two on the Bubbling Under R&B/Hip-Hop Singles chart.)	—	78	14	—	—		YSIV
"Ordinary Day" (featuring Hailee Steinfeld)	2018	—	—	—	—	20	—	—		YSIV
"YSIV"	2018	— (Note: "YSIV" did not enter the Billboard Hot 100, but peaked at number ten on the Bubbling Under Hot 100 Singles chart, which acts as an extension to the Hot 100.)	— (Note: "YSIV" did not enter the Billboard Hot R&B/Hip-Hop Songs chart, but peaked at number five on the Bubbling Under R&B/Hip-Hop Singles chart.)	—	—	18	—	—		YSIV
"Iconic" (featuring Jaden Smith)	2018	— (Note: "Iconic" did not enter the Billboard Hot 100, but peaked at number 21 on the Bubbling Under Hot 100 Singles chart.)	—	—	—	15	—	—		YSIV
"Bohemian Trapsody"	2019	—	—	18	—	—	—	—		Supermarket
"Can I Kick It" (featuring Juto)	2019	—	—	29	—	—	—	—		Supermarket
"Time Machine"	2019	—	—	42	—	—	—	—		Supermarket
"Pretty Young Girl"	2019	—	—	39	—	—	—	—		Supermarket
"Baby"	2019	—	—	50	—	—	—	—		Supermarket
"Mama / Show Love" (featuring Cordae)	2019	—	—	—	—	18	—	—		Confessions of a Dangerous Mind
"Commando" (featuring G-Eazy)	2019	— (Note: "Commando" did not enter the Billboard Hot 100, but peaked at number 22 on the Bubbling Under Hot 100 chart.)	—	—	—	17	—	—		Confessions of a Dangerous Mind
"Icy" (featuring Gucci Mane)	2019	— (Note: "Icy" did not enter the Billboard Hot 100, but peaked at number four on the Bubbling Under Hot 100 Singles chart.)	43	—	—	—	—	—		Confessions of a Dangerous Mind
"Still Ballin" (featuring Wiz Khalifa)	2019	—	—	—	—	22	—	—		Confessions of a Dangerous Mind
"No Pressure Intro"	2020	— (Note: "No Pressure Intro" did not enter the Billboard Hot 100, but peaked at number four on the Bubbling Under Hot 100 Singles chart.)	48	—	—	—	—	—		No Pressure
"Hit My Line"	2020	— (Note: "Hit My Line" did not enter the Billboard Hot 100, but peaked at number five on the Bubbling Under Hot 100 Singles chart.)	50	—	—	—	—	—		No Pressure
"GP4"	2020	— (Note: "GP4" did not enter the Billboard Hot 100, but peaked at number 11 on the Bubbling Under Hot 100 Singles chart.)	—	—	—	—	—	—		No Pressure
"Soul Food II"	2020	— (Note: "Soul Food II" did not enter the Billboard Hot 100, but peaked at number 17 on the Bubbling Under Hot 100 Singles chart.)	—	—	—	—	—	—		No Pressure
"In My Lifetime" (featuring Action Bronson)	2022	—	—	—	—	33	—	—		Vinyl Days
"Self Medication" (featuring Seth MacFarlane, Redman and Statik Selektah)	2023	— (Note: "Self Medication" did not enter the Billboard Hot 100, but peaked at number 25 on the Bubbling Under Hot 100 Singles chart.)	49	—	—	21	—	—		College Park
"—" denotes a recording that did not chart or was not released in that territory.

== Guest appearances ==
List of non-single guest appearances, with other performing artists, showing year released and album name
Title	Year	Other artist(s)	Album
"Drift Away"	2010	Damian Lemar Hudson	None
"Build You Up to Break You Down"	2011	David Correy	None
"Now"	2012	Javier Speaks, Abir	None
"Nowhere to Go"	2012	Sylvan LaCue	Fear Not Failure
"World Wide"	2012	C Dot Castro	None
"Untouchable"	2013	Dizzy Wright, Kirk Knight	The Golden Age
"When the Lions Come"	2013	Jon Bellion, Castro, Blaque Keyz	The Separation
"Juveniles"	2014	Audio Push, Jill Scott	#The2014DraftPicks
"Alarm Clock"	2014	Statik Selektah, Ab-Soul, Jon Connor	What Goes Around
"Skyscraper"	2015	Demrick, Cali Cleve, King Chip	Losing Focus
"Transmission"	2015	Zedd, X Ambassadors	True Colors
"Tryna' Tryna'"	2015	Lil Durk	Remember My Name
"Mode"	2015	PRhyme	Southpaw (OST)
"Lavish"	2015	Just Juice, Mojo	Lavish Life
"Where You Been"	2015	Michael Christmas	What a Weird Day
"Mode II"	2015	PRhyme	PRhyme {Deluxe}
"I Ain't Fukin wit Cha"	2015	Juicy J	O's to Oscars
"Here" (Remix)	2015	Alessia Cara	"Here"
"Ice Cold"	2017	Big Lenbo	Strange Days
"Run"	2017	Ana-Tole, Ripsy May	The Arkadian Spring
"Bennie and the Jets"	2018	Elton John, Pink	Revamp: Reimagining the Songs of Elton John & Bernie Taupin
"Caterpillar" (Remix)	2018	Royce da 5'9", King Green	Book of Ryan
"Ballin"	2018	None	Uncle Drew (soundtrack) (Note: "Ballin" is also a part of Logic's mixtape, Young Sinatra: Welcome to Forever, which features rapper Castro. The soundtrack version omits Castro's verse.)
"Dope Talent"	2018	Dizzy Wright	Don't Tell Me It Can't Be Done
"Playinwitme" (Remix)	2018	Kyle, Kehlani	Non-album single
"Ayy"	2019	Berner, Mozzy, YG	Slimey Individualz
"High Today"	2020	Wiz Khalifa	The Saga of Wiz Khalifa
"1995"	2020	Juicy J	The Hustle Continues
"Shawty Bad"	2020	Juicy J	The Hustle Continues
"Tanaka 2"	2023	Joey Valence & Brae	Punk Tactics
"Intergalactic Icons"	2023	Riff Raff, Conway the Machine	Welcome to Shaolin
"Still Alright"	2024	Joyner Lucas, Twista	Not Now, I'm Busy
"Blah"	2024	Statik Selektah & Kota the Friend	Once in a Blue Moon
"WMD"	2025	6ix	Homebody

== Music videos ==
List of music videos, showing year released and directors
Title	Year	Director(s)	Ref.
As lead artist
"Stain in the Game"	2010	Chris Farmer and Tomi Gunz	
"Prime" (Note: The music video was originally released on February 18, 2011, before being removed.)	2011	Dro Victorious	
"Backpack" (Note: The music video was originally released on March 7, 2011, before being removed.)	2011	GRVTY	
"Stewie Griffin" (Note: The music video was originally released on May 27, 2011, before being removed.)	2011	GRVTY	
"Mind of Logic" (featuring Camille Michelle Gray)	2011	GRVTY	
"Young Sinatra II"	2011	GRVTY	
"Just Another Day (In My Mind)"	2011	GRVTY	
"All I Do"	2011	GRVTY	
"Live on the Air"	2011	GRVTY	
"Young Sinatra III"	2012	GRVTY	
"The Spotlight"	2012	GRVTY	
"Numbers" (Note: The music video was originally released on March 5, 2012, before being removed.)	2012	GRVTY	
"Walk on By"	2013	GRVTY	
"Nasty"	2013	GRVTY	
"Under Pressure"	2014	Stephen Mallett	
"Young Jesus" (featuring Big Lenbo)	2015	Logic	
"Sucker for Pain" (with Lil Wayne, Wiz Khalifa, Imagine Dragons and Ty Dolla Sign featuring X Ambassadors)	2016	Elliott Sellers	
"Flexicution"	2016	Wayne Isham	
"Super Mario World"	2016	Justin Fleischer	
"Black Spiderman" (featuring Damian Lemar Hudson)	2017	Andy Hines	
"Take It Back"	2017	Andy Hines	
"1-800-273-8255" (featuring Alessia Cara and Khalid)	2017	Andy Hines	
"Overnight"	2018	Mike Holland, Justin Fleischer and Alec Schweitzer	
"Everyday" (with Marshmello)	2018	Alan Ferguson	
"Contra"	2018	Mike Holland	
"One Day" (featuring Ryan Tedder)	2018	Andy Hines	
"Everybody Dies"	2018	Mike Holland	
"Do What You Love" (with HITRECORD)	2019	Andy Hines	
"Confessions of a Dangerous Mind"	2019	Unknown	
"Homicide" (featuring Eminem)	2019	James Larese	
"Icy" (featuring Gucci Mane)	2019	Colin Tilley	
"DadBod"	2020	Justin Fleischer	
"Aquarius III"	2020	Justin Fleischer and JT Clemente	
"Vaccine"	2021	Mike Holland and Justin Fleischer	
As featured artist
"Drift Away" (Damian Lemar Hudson featuring Logic)	2010	Damian Lemar Hudson	
"Willing to Die" (Gin Wigmore featuring Suffa and Logic)	2016	Lucy Wigmore	
"Pray" (Sam Smith featuring Logic)	2018	Joseph Connor	
"The Feeling" (John Lindahl featuring Logic)	2018	Cameron Jesperson and Ryan Livesay	
"Start Again" (OneRepublic featuring Logic)	2018	James Lees	
"ISIS" (Joyner Lucas featuring Logic)	2019	Ben Proulx and Joyner Lucas	
"A Letter to My Younger Self" (Quinn XCII featuring Logic)	2020	Brian Petchers	
"1995" (Juicy J featuring Logic)	2020	Justin Fleischer and Mike Holland	
