= Confessions of a Dangerous Mind =

Confessions of a Dangerous Mind may refer to:

- Confessions of a Dangerous Mind, a 1984 autobiography by Chuck Barris
  - Confessions of a Dangerous Mind (film), a 2002 film adaptation of the book
- Confessions of a Dangerous Mind (album), the fifth studio album by rapper Logic
  - "Confessions of a Dangerous Mind" (song), the second single and title track from the album
