= One Day (Logic song) =

Single by Logic featuring Ryan Tedder

from the album YSIV
- Released: July 27, 2018
- Genre: Pop rap
- Length: 3:20
- Label: Visionary; Def Jam
- Songwriters: Sir Robert Bryson Hall II; Ryan Tedder; Arjun Ivatury; Kevin Randolph
- Producers: Logic; 6ix; Kevin Randolph

Logic singles chronology
"Start Again" (2018)	"One Day" (2018)	"The Return" (2018)

"One Day" is a song by American rapper Logic. It was released on July 27, 2018, by Visionary Music Group and Def Jam Recordings, as the lead single from Logic's fourth studio album, YSIV. Produced by Logic, 6ix, and Kevin Randolph, the song features guest vocals from singer-songwriter Ryan Tedder. The writing credits are shared between both the artists and the producers. "One Day" peaked at number 80 on the US Billboard Hot 100. He performed the song with Ryan Tedder at the 2018 MTV Video Music Awards.

== Background ==
The song was created in 20 minutes according to Logic in an interview with HardKnockTV, where he also explains why he released this as the first single for his then upcoming album:

It was the most positive. To me that is the quintessential ‘Young Sinatra,’ happy vibe, dope, I got those. There's a lot of fans who felt that vibe as well… If there's anything I want to represent this album, it would definitely be ["One Day"]

== Music video ==
The song's accompanying music video premiered on August 17, 2018, on Logic's Vevo channel on YouTube. The music video was, like the "1-800-273-8255" video, directed by Andy Hines. The main cast consisted of Luis Guzmán, Judy Reyes, Michael Peña, Ty Simpkins, and Madeline Brewer. The video depicts the life of a child who was separated from his family at the border between Mexico and the United States. He becomes a doctor and saves the life of a white supremacist.

== Charts ==
Chart (2018–19)	Peak position
Canada Hot 100 (Billboard)	92
Czech Republic Airplay (ČNS IFPI)	57
Sweden Heatseeker (Sverigetopplistan)	8
UK Singles (Official Charts)	99
US Billboard Hot 100	80
US Hot R&B/Hip-Hop Songs (Billboard)	31
US Pop Airplay (Billboard)	32
US Rhythmic Airplay (Billboard)	21
