= Black Spiderman (song) =

Single by Logic featuring Damian Lemar Hudson

from the album Everybody
- Released: April 13, 2017
- Genre: Conscious hip-hop
- Length: 5:31
- Label: Visionary; Def Jam
- Songwriters: Sir Robert Bryson Hall II; Arjun Ivatury; Damian Lemar Hudson; Khalil Abdul-Rahman; Sam Barsh
- Producers: Logic; 6ix; DJ Khalil

Logic singles chronology
| "Everybody" (2017) | "Black Spiderman" (2017) | "1-800-273-8255" (2017) |

Damian Lemar Hudson singles chronology
| "Black Spiderman" (2017) |

"Black Spiderman" is a song by American rapper Logic featuring singer Damian Lemar Hudson. It was released on April 13, 2017, by Visionary Music Group and Def Jam Recordings, as the second single from his third studio album Everybody. It was awarded a 2017 MTV Video Music Award for "Best Fight Against the System." The song was produced by Logic, 6ix and DJ Khalil.

== Background ==
Logic teased the song on November 30, 2016, on his Twitter account with the caption saying "When you feel it in your SOUL!". In the liner notes for the song, Logic said that:

This song is the celebration of unity and a world built upon division. People say things like I don’t see color, I just see people. To which I retour you should see color, you should see a black man, a white woman, a brown little girl or any other color of the rainbow.

== Music video ==
The song's accompanying music video premiered on April 13, 2017, on Logic's Vevo account on YouTube. In August 2017, "Black Spiderman" was awarded an MTV Video Music Award for "Best Fight Against the System."

== Commercial performance ==
"Black Spiderman" debuted at number 87 on the Billboard Hot 100 and number 80 the Canadian Hot 100 for the chart dated May 6, 2017.

== Charts ==
| Chart (2017) | Peak position |
|---|---|
| Canada Hot 100 (Billboard) | 80 |
| New Zealand Heatseekers (RMNZ) | 8 |
| US Billboard Hot 100 | 87 |
| US Hot R&B/Hip-Hop Songs (Billboard) | 46 |

== Certifications ==
| Region | Certification | Certified units/sales |
|---|---|---|
| United States (RIAA) | Platinum | 1,000,000^{‡} |
^{‡} Sales+streaming figures based on certification alone.
