= College Park (album) =

Studio album by Logic
- Released: February 24, 2023
- Recorded: 2021–2023
- Genre: Hip hop
- Length: 67:25
- Labels: BobbyBoy; Three Oh One; BMG
- Producers: 6ix; Boi-1da; Conor Albert; Eugene; Jahaan Sweet; Kaelin Ellis; Kal Banks; Keanu Beats; Logic; Monte Booker; PSTMN; Soundtrakk; Travis Stacey

Logic chronology
Vinyl Days (2022)	College Park (2023)	3P (with C Dot Castro) (2023)

Singles from College Park
- 1. "Wake Up" Released: January 13, 2023; 2. "Highlife" Released: January 30, 2023; 3. "Paradise II (Single Version)" Released: February 7, 2023; 4. "Lightsabers" Released: February 22, 2023

College Park is the eighth studio album by American rapper Logic. It was released through BobbyBoy Records, Three Oh One Productions, and BMG Rights Management on February 24, 2023. The album marks Logic's first release as an independent artist since Young Sinatra: Welcome to Forever (2013), following a 10-year stint with Def Jam. It features guest appearances from ADÉ, Andy Hull, Big Lenbo, Bun B, C Dot Castro, Fat Trel, Jordan Harris, Lil' Keke, Lucy Rose, Norah Jones, RZA, Redman, Joey Badass, Seth MacFarlane, and Statik Selektah.

== Background ==
Logic first teased the album in an Instagram story in October 2021. The album's title was referenced several times throughout Logic's previous album, Vinyl Days (2022). College Park was officially announced on January 10, 2023, set to be his first release since parting ways with Def Jam after releasing seven studio albums with the label. In the past, he had expressed his frustration with the label: "I think for me, I've had a relationship that's been very up and down, but it's been a lot of ups, it really has. I can't sit here and just go in on Def Jam, when it's not Def Jam, it's major labels in general," he told Apple Music.

In a video posted on Logic's YouTube channel, Logic told fans, "I love y'all and I'm making shit from the heart. I'm loving hip-hop. I was not really feeling it for a while. I don't really mean the music, I just mean the bullshit of the industry. But I realize now more than ever that none of that shit matters. I've missed you guys and I'm here and I just want to have fun and I'm so excited for College Park."

== Critical reception ==
Professional ratings
Review scores
Source	Rating
AllMusic	4/5 stars
Clash	7/10

== Commercial performance ==
In the United States, College Park debuted on number 21 on the Billboard 200.

== Track listing ==
College Park track listing
No.	Title	Writer(s)	Producer(s)	Length
1.	"Cruisin' Through the Universe" (featuring RZA)	Sir Robert Bryson Hall II; Robert Diggs; Arjun Ivatury	6ix; Keanu Beats	3:10
2.	"Wake Up" (featuring Lucy Rose)	Hall II; Lucy Rose Parton; Ivatury	6ix; Logic	2:58
3.	"Lightsabers" (featuring C Dot Castro)	Hall II	6ix; Logic	4:51
4.	"Clone Wars III"	Hall II	Logic; PSTMN	3:45
5.	"Redpill VII"	Hall II; Ivatury	6ix; Logic	4:13
6.	"Playwright" (featuring Andy Hull)	Hall II; John Andrew Hull; Ivatury	6ix; PSTMN	3:20
7.	"Gaithersburg Freestyle" (featuring C Dot Castro, Big Lenbo, Fat Trel, and ADÉ)	Hall II	6ix; Eugene	3:01
8.	"Insipio"	Hall II	Logic; Kaelin Ellis	3:02
9.	"Self Medication" (featuring Seth MacFarlane, Redman, and Statik Selektah)	Hall II; Seth MacFarlane; Reginald Noble; Patrick Baril; Ivatury	6ix; Logic; PSTMN	5:15
10.	"Shimmy" (featuring Joey Badass)	Hall II; Jo-Vaughn Virginie Scott; Ivatury	6ix; Soundtrakk	2:36
11.	"Paradise II" (featuring Norah Jones)	Hall II; Norah Jones	Conor Albert	6:14
12.	"Come On Down" (featuring Jordan Harris)	Hall II; Jordan Harris; Matthew Samuels; Jahaan Akil Sweet; Ahmanti Booker	Logic; Boi-1da; Jahaan Sweet; Monte Booker	2:42
13.	"Village Slum"	Hall II	Logic	3:29
14.	"Highlife"	Hall II; Ivatury	6ix; Logic; Travis Stacey	2:38
15.	"38.9897 °N, 76.9378 °W" (featuring C Dot Castro and Big Lenbo)	Hall II	6ix	4:17
16.	"Ayo" (featuring Bun B and Lil' Keke)	Hall II; Bernard Freeman; Marcus Edwards	Logic; PSTMN	3:35
17.	"Lightyear"	Hall II; Ivatury	6ix; Logic; Kal Banx; PSTMN	8:19
Total length:				67:25

Notes:

- "Lightsabers" contains uncredited vocals by Juicy J.

== Personnel ==
Musicians

- Logic – vocals (all tracks), electric guitar (track 13)
- Josh Lippi – bass guitar (1–9, 12, 13, 16), electric guitar (3, 4, 8)
- Steve Wyreman – electric guitar (1, 6, 12)
- Kevin Randolph – synthesizer (1–6, 12), Rhodes piano (2–9, 13, 16), keyboards (2), Mellotron (4, 5, 9, 12), piano (5, 17), organ (12)
- RZA – vocals (1)
- Chris Thornton – backing vocals (2–5, 8, 16, 17)
- Lucy Rose – backing vocals (2–5, 8, 12, 16, 17)
- Pete Jacobson – cello (2, 4, 5, 8, 9, 12, 16, 17)
- Tom Lea – viola, violin (2, 4, 5, 8, 9, 12, 16, 17)
- Juicy J – additional vocals (3)
- Greg Somerville – backing vocals (3)
- C Dot Castro – vocals (3, 7, 15)
- Travis Stacey – electric guitar (5)
- Stuart D. Bogie – saxophone (5, 8, 13, 16, 17), flute (13)
- Josh "Rookie" – additional vocals (6)
- Chukwudi Hodge – drums (6)
- Arkae Tuazon – keyboards (6)
- Andy Hull – vocals (6)
- ADÉ – vocals (7)
- Big Lenbo – vocals (7, 15)
- Fat Trel – vocals (7)
- 6ix – electric guitar (9, 13), sound effects (11), acoustic guitar (14), bass guitar (14)
- Statik Selektah – scratching, vocals (9)
- Redman – vocals (9)
- Seth MacFarlane – vocals (9)
- Joey Badass – vocals (10)
- Norah Jones – celeste piano, piano, vocals (11)
- Jordan Harris – vocals, backing vocals (12)
- Lil' Keke – vocals (12, 16)
- Bun B – vocals (16)

Technical

- Dave Kutch – mastering
- Bobby Campbell – mixing (all tracks), engineering (1, 6, 7, 11, 13)
- PSTMN – engineering (1–6, 8–10, 12, 14, 15), engineering assistance (7)
- Reed Seely – engineering (2–5, 8–10, 12, 16, 17)
- Nich Jones – engineering assistance (2–5, 8–10, 12, 16, 17)
- Josh Kay – engineering assistance (11)

== Charts ==
Chart performance for College Park
Chart (2023)	Peak position
Canadian Albums (Billboard)	61
UK Album Downloads (Official Charts)	41
UK Independent Albums (Official Charts)	32
UK R&B Albums (Official Charts)	6
US Billboard 200	21
US Top R&B/Hip-Hop Albums (Billboard)	12
