= Ultra 85 =

Studio album by Logic
- Released: August 9, 2024
- Genre: Hip-hop
- Length: 77:15
- Labels: BobbyBoy; Three Oh One; BMG
- Producers: 6ix; Conor Albert; Beat Butcha; Bobby Campbell; Cre8; Kaelin Ellis; PoST; Logic; yogic

Logic chronology
Inglorious Basterd (2023)	Ultra 85 (2024)	Aquarius III (2025)

Singles from Ultra 85
- 1. "Fear" Released: February 2, 2024; 2. "44ever" Released: April 19, 2024; 3. "Deja Vu" Released: May 31, 2024; 4. "Mission Control" Released: July 19, 2024; 5. "Teleport" Released: August 5, 2024

Ultra 85 is the ninth studio album by American rapper and record producer Logic. It was released through BobbyBoy Records, Three Oh One Productions, and BMG Rights Management on August 9, 2024. The album features guest appearances from Adé, DJ Drama, Robert Ivory, Lucy Rose, T Man the Wizard, and Zelooperz. Production was primarily handled by 6ix and Logic himself, alongside Beat Butcha, Cre8, PoST, and Kaelin Ellis, among others. At 77 minutes, it is the longest album in Logic's discography, surpassing YSIV (2018) by one minute.

== Background and release ==
The album was initially announced by Logic on May 5, 2017, through a hidden message, which was contained within a booklet included with physical editions of his 2017 album Everybody. The album is intended to be released alongside Logic's science fiction novel of the same name, with the latter released on September 17, 2024.

On January 17, 2025, Logic released an extended play of leftovers during the Ultra 85 production, titled Aquarius III.

== Critical reception ==
Professional ratings
Review scores
Source	Rating
AllMusic	4.5/5 stars

The album received critical acclaim. Reviewing the album for AllMusic, Neil Z. Yeung described it as, "Vibrant, exciting, and back to basics, [the album] is a blessing to fans willing to dig into the lore, and could even be an accessible entry point for casual listeners digging into his entertaining wordplay, underrated flow, and old-school production." and called it a "multimedia experience that doubles as one of the stronger, more mature efforts in his catalog."

== Track listing ==
Ultra 85 track listing
No.	Title	Writer(s)	Producer(s)	Length
1.	"Paul Rodriguez"	Sir Robert Bryson Hall II; Eliot Dubock; Arjun Ivatury	6ix; Beat Butcha	9:07
2.	"Mission Control" (featuring T Man the Wizard)	Hall; Tramayne Hudson; Ivatury	6ix; Logic	2:11
3.	"Deja Vu" (featuring DJ Drama)	Hall; Gene Puerling	6ix; Logic	3:22
4.	"Glorious Ultra Panavision" (skit)	Hall	Bobby Campbell; Logic	1:52
5.	"Fear"	Conor Albert; Hall; Ivatury	6ix; Conor Albert; Logic	4:12
6.	"Favela"	Kaelin Ellis; Hall	Kaelin Ellis; Logic	2:59
7.	"Gardens III"	Hall	Logic	5:15
8.	"Ghost in the Machine" (featuring Robert Ivory and Adé)	Hall; Philip Adetumbi; Ivatury; Jerry Peters; Anita Poree	6ix; Logic	4:25
9.	"Innerstellar" (featuring Lucy Rose)	Hall; Ivatury; Lucy Rose Parton	6ix; Logic	4:20
10.	"In Retrospect"	Hall; Hudson; Ivatury	6ix; Logic	4:48
11.	"44ever"	Hall; Ivatury; Kyle Metcalfe	6ix; PoST	1:56
12.	"Love Me"	Hall; Metcalfe	Logic; PoST	3:15
13.	"Planet Death" (skit)	Hall	Campbell; Logic	3:13
14.	"Teleport"	Hall; Ivatury	6ix; Logic	3:26
15.	"Chess" (skit)	Hall	Campbell; Logic	0:55
16.	"Antidote" (featuring Zelooperz)	Hall; Ivatury; Walter Williams	6ix	2:40
17.	"Once Upon a Time in Hollywood"	Hall; Ivatury	6ix; Logic	5:38
18.	"Peace Love & Positivity"	Hall; Ivatury; Kevin Randolph; Steve Wyreman	6ix; Logic	4:27
19.	"City in the Stars" (featuring Robert Ivory)	Hall; Ivory; Luke Johansson; Tandeo Mufalo	Cre8; Logic; yogic	4:24
20.	"Thank You for Believing in Me"	Hall; Hudson; Ivatury; Kyle Metcalfe	6ix; Logic; PoST	4:50
Total length:				77:15

=== Notes ===
- "Paul Rodriguez" contains additional vocals from Paul Rodriguez and Lil' Keke.
- "Paul Rodriguez" contains a sample of “Love So Kind” by The Frank Cunimondo Trio and Lynn Marino.
- "Mission Control" contains a sample of "Lemonade", written by Shondrae Crawford and Radric Davis, as performed by Gucci Mane, which itself samples "Keep It Warm", written by Howard Kaylan and Mark Volman, as performed by Flo & Eddie.
- "Deja Vu" contains a sample of "Fade Away", written by Sir Robert Bryson Hall II, Sean Anderson, Steven Blum, Anna Palchikoff, and Kevin Randolph, as performed as Logic, which itself samples "Deck The Halls", written by Gene Puerling, as performed by the Singers Unlimited.
- "Ghost in the Machine" contains a sample of "Going in Circles", written by Jerry Peters and Anita Poree, as performed by the Friends of Distinction.

== Personnel ==
Musicians

- Logic – vocals
- Steve Wyreman – electric guitar (tracks 1, 3, 5, 7–9, 17–20), bass guitar (1, 3, 5, 8, 18), Melotron (3), synthesizer (5, 9, 17, 19), acoustic guitar (5, 18, 19), piano (5, 19)
- Kevin Randolph – synthesizer (tracks 1, 3, 5, 7, 9, 10, 17, 20), Rhodes piano (1, 5, 9), piano (1, 9, 18, 20), strings (3), organ (10)
- Chris Thornton – backing vocals (tracks 1, 5, 8, 9, 12, 17, 18, 20)
- Stuart Bogie – tenor saxophone (tracks 1, 7–9, 12, 17), saxophone (3), flute (6–9, 18)
- Lil' Keke – additional vocals (track 1)
- Paul Rodriguez – additional vocals (track 1)
- Rhetorik – scratches (tracks 2, 6–8)
- T Man the Wizard – vocals (track 2), additional vocals (10), backing vocals (17, 20)
- Peter Jacobson – cello (tracks 3, 5–10, 12, 17, 20)
- Tom Lea – viola, violin (tracks 3, 5–10, 12, 17, 20)
- DJ Drama – vocals (track 3)
- Dria Thornton – backing vocals (tracks 5, 8, 9, 12, 17, 18, 20)
- 6ix – bass guitar (tracks 7, 10); acoustic guitar, electric guitar (10)
- Kyle Metcalfe – electric guitar (tracks 7, 20), bass guitar (20)
- Adé – vocals (track 8), backing vocals (12, 17, 20)
- Robert Ivory – vocals (tracks 8, 19), backing vocals (17, 20)
- Lucy Rose – vocals (track 9)
- Zelooperz – vocals (16)

Technical

- Dave Kutch – mastering
- Bobby Campbell – mixing, engineering
- Kyle Metcalfe – engineering
- Marcus Hamblett – engineering (track 9)

== Charts ==
Chart performance for Ultra 85
Chart (2024)	Peak position
UK Album Downloads (Official Charts)	73
US Billboard 200	45
US Independent Albums (Billboard)	10
US Top R&B/Hip-Hop Albums (Billboard)	13
