= Keanu Reeves (song) =

2019 song by Logic

Single by Logic

from the album Confessions of a Dangerous Mind
- Released: January 18, 2019
- Genre: Hip-hop; trap
- Length: 3:46
- Label: Visionary; Def Jam
- Songwriters: Sir Robert Bryson Hall II; Arjun Ivatury; Lakshmikanth
- Producers: AG; 6ix

Logic singles chronology
"Everybody Dies" (2018)	"Keanu Reeves" (2019)	"Confessions of a Dangerous Mind" (2019)

Music video
- "Keanu Reeves" on YouTube

"Keanu Reeves" is a song by American rapper Logic from his fifth studio album, Confessions of a Dangerous Mind (2019). Written by Logic and its producers AG and 6ix, it was released on January 18, 2019, by Visionary Music Group and Def Jam Recordings as the album's lead single. It peaked at number 38 at the US Billboard Hot 100.

== Charts ==
Weekly chart performance for "Keanu Reeves"
Chart (2019)	Peak position
Australia (ARIA)	92
Canada Hot 100 (Billboard)	34
Greece (IFPI)	29
Ireland (IRMA)	74
Lithuania (AGATA)	52
Sweden Heatseeker (Sverigetopplistan)	7
UK Singles (OCC)	86
US Billboard Hot 100	38
US Hot R&B/Hip-Hop Songs (Billboard)	18

== Certifications ==
Region	Certification	Certified units/sales
New Zealand (RMNZ)	Gold	15,000^{‡}
United States (RIAA)	Platinum	1,000,000^{‡}
^{‡} Sales+streaming figures based on certification alone.
