= Supermarket (Logic album) =

Soundtrack album by Logic
- Released: March 26, 2019
- Recorded: 2016–2019
- Genre: Alternative rock
- Length: 49:08
- Label: Def Jam; Visionary
- Producer: 6ix (exec.); Logic; Juto; Mac DeMarco; Tomo Milicevic

Logic chronology
YSIV (2018)	Supermarket (2019)	Confessions of a Dangerous Mind (2019)

Supermarket is a soundtrack album by American rapper Logic. It was released on March 26, 2019, by Def Jam Recordings and Visionary Music Group. The soundtrack serves as a tie-in for his novel of the same name. The soundtrack was released to negative reviews by music critics, though it peaked at number 56 on the Billboard 200.

== Promotion ==
The release date was announced on January 10, 2019.

== Reception ==
Professional ratings
Review scores
Source	Rating
Exclaim!	4/10
Pitchfork	2.9/10
Rolling Stone	1.5/5 stars

The album received generally negative reviews. Danny Schwartz, writing for Rolling Stone, characterized Supermarket as "uniquely bad", "bold yet bland" and a "suite of vapid love songs". Reed Jackson of Pitchfork described it as "a painful journey across guitar music of the past five decades." Calum Slingerland of Exclaim! negatively reviewed both the album and the accompanying novel, stating that "those who aren't card-carrying Rattpack devotees will come away with little to chew on".

The album peaked at number 56 on the Billboard 200, with 11,823 total album-equivalent units, 2,947 of which were pure album sales.

== Track listing ==
Credits adapted from Tidal.

No.	Title	Writer(s)	Producer(s)	Length
1.	"Bohemian Trapsody"	Sir Robert Bryson Hall II; Arjun Ivatury	6ix; Logic	6:44
2.	"Can I Kick It" (featuring Juto)	Hall II; Ivatury; Lou Reed	6ix; Juto; Logic	3:21
3.	"Time Machine"	Hall II; Ivatury	6ix; Logic	3:48
4.	"Pretty Young Girl"	Hall II; Ivatury	6ix; Logic	4:15
5.	"Supermarket"	Hall II; Ivatury	6ix; Logic	3:03
6.	"Baby"	Hall II; Ivatury; Kenneth Gamble; Leon Huff	6ix; Logic	3:58
7.	"By the Bridge"	Hall II; Ivatury	6ix; Logic	4:02
8.	"Best Friend"	Hall II; Tomo Milicevic	Logic; Milicevic	4:02
9.	"Lemon Drop"	Hall II; Ivatury	6ix; Logic	2:13
10.	"I'm Probably Gonna Rock Your World"	Hall II; Mac DeMarco	DeMarco	2:32
11.	"Vacation from Myself"	Hall II; DeMarco	DeMarco	2:22
12.	"DeLorean"	Hall II; Ivatury	6ix; Logic	4:28
13.	"I Love You Forever"	Hall II; Ivatury	6ix; Logic	4:16
Total length:				49:08

Notes

- "Bohemian Trapsody" features additional vocals by Arkae Tuazon, Damian Lemar Hudson, Jairus Leon Gay and John Lindahl
- "Can I Kick It" features background vocals by Alec Schweitzer, Arjun Ivatury, Damian Lemar Hudson, Jairus Leon Gay, John Lindahl, Jordan Harris, José Araujo, Leon Ressalam, and Tomo Milicevic
- Lou Reed is credited as the sole songwriter of "Can I Kick It" on streaming services
- "Time Machine" features background vocals by Damian Lemar Hudson, Jairus Leon Gay and John Lindahl
- "Supermarket" features background vocals by Damian Lemar Hudson
- "Baby" features background vocals by Arkae Tuazon, Damian Lemar Hudson, Jairus Leon Gay
- "Lemon Drop" features background vocals by Will Wells
- "I Love You Forever" features background vocals by Arkae Tuazon

Sample credits

- "Can I Kick It" contains an interpolation of "Can I Kick It?", performed by A Tribe Called Quest.
- "Baby" contains an interpolation of "Just a Friend", performed by Biz Markie.

== Charts ==
Chart (2019)	Peak position
Canadian Albums (Billboard)	82
US Billboard 200	56
US Top Alternative Albums (Billboard)	6
US Top Rock Albums (Billboard)	11
