= Bobby Tarantino III =

Mixtape by Logic
- Released: July 30, 2021
- Recorded: 2020–2021
- Genre: Hip-hop
- Length: 33:07
- Label: Def Jam; Visionary
- Producer: 6ix; Beat Butcha; Coop the Truth; Fabio Aguilar; FnZ; Keanu Beats; Logic; MTK; PSTMN; Tyler Murphy; VIG

Logic chronology
YS Collection Vol. 1 (2021)	Bobby Tarantino III (2021)	Vinyl Days (2022)

Singles from Bobby Tarantino III
- 1. "Vaccine" Released: July 2, 2021; 2. "Get Up" Released: July 9, 2021; 3. "My Way" Released: July 16, 2021; 4. "Call Me" Released: July 23, 2021

Bobby Tarantino III is the seventh mixtape by American rapper Logic. It was released on July 30, 2021, through Def Jam Recordings and Visionary Music Group. The mixtape features a sole guest appearance from English actress and singer-songwriter Cynthia Erivo, who is featured on the sixth track, "Inside". It serves as the third and final installment to Logic's Bobby Tarantino mixtape trilogy. It also serves as his second project of 2021, following the release of his debut compilation album, YS Collection Vol. 1. The mixtape was preceded by four singles: "Vaccine", "Get Up", "My Way", and "Call Me".

== Background ==
The mixtape serves as the third and final installment to Logic's Bobby Tarantino mixtape trilogy. The first installment was released in 2016 and the second installment was released in 2018. The cover art was created by Sam Spratt, who has created previous album and single cover arts for Logic. It shows a zombie escaping a burning car.

== Release and promotion ==
On July 2, 2021, Logic released the single "Vaccine", in which he rapped, "Ready to fuck up the game, BT3, now we at it again, man", teasing the release of Bobby Tarantino III. After the song was released, he also tweeted about the existence of the mixtape. He revealed the release date and cover art on July 26, 2021.

== Singles ==
Logic released the mixtape's lead single, "Vaccine", on July 2, 2021. Exactly one week later, on July 9, 2021, he followed it up with the second single, "Get Up". The third single, "My Way", was released on July 16, 2021. Finally, the fourth and final single, "Call Me", was released on July 23, 2021, exactly one week prior to the release of the mixtape. Each single was released one week after each other and were released every Friday of July in order, with the mixtape being released the final Friday.

== Critical reception ==
Bobby Tarantino III ratings
Review scores
Source	Rating
AllMusic	2.5/5 stars
HipHopDX	3/5

Writing for This Song Is Sick, Austin Miller felt that with "kinetic tracks" that "keep the energy turned up with dynamic beats and feverish verses", such as "Vaccine", "God Might Judge", and "See You Space Cowboy", and songs that "float through a smoother current", like "Get Up" and "Call Me", "Logic's masterful lyricism and limitless flow run the gamut of brutal self-honesty to supportive optimism, all without any signs that this project is anything less than some of his best work yet".

== Track listing ==
Bobby Tarantino III track listing
No.	Title	Writer(s)	Producer(s)	Length
1.	"Introll"	Sir Robert Bryson Hall II; Arjun Ivatury; Gabriel Stevenson	Logic	1:00
2.	"Vaccine"	Hall; Ivatury	Logic; 6ix	2:02
3.	"Get Up"	Hall; Ivatury; Kyle Metcalfe; Tyler Murphy; Adam Feeney	6ix; PSTMN; Murphy	3:33
4.	"My Way"	Hall; Ivatury	6ix	2:37
5.	"Call Me"	Hall; Ivatury; Cooper McGill; William Harris	6ix; Coop the Truth	3:30
6.	"Inside" (featuring Cynthia Erivo)	Hall; Ivatury; Michael Mule; Isaac De Boni; Keanu Torres	6ix; FnZ; Keanu Beats	2:20
7.	"Flawless"	Hall; Ivatury	6ix	3:44
8.	"Stupid Skit"	Hall; Ivatury; Eliot Dubock	6ix; Beat Butcha	0:50
9.	"Theme for the People"	Hall; Ivatury; Metcalfe; Vignesh Vishwanathan	6ix; PSTMN; VIG	1:57
10.	"God Might Judge"	Hall; Ivatury; Stokley Williams; Keri Lewis; Jeffrey Allen; Homer Odell; Lawrence Waddell; Ricky Minchen	6ix	5:30
11.	"See You Space Cowboy..."	Hall; Ivatury; Torres; Fabio Aguilar; Kamaal Fareed; Malik Taylor; Ali Shaheed Jones-Muhammad	6ix; Keanu Beats; Aguilar	4:00
12.	"Untitled"	Hall; Ivatury; Matthew Crabtree	6ix; MTK	2:09
Total length:				33:07

Notes

- "Introll" and "Untitled" are stylized in all lowercase.
- "Call Me" features background vocals from Dwn2earth.
- "God Might Judge" contains samples from "U Send Me Swingin'", performed by Mint Condition.

== Personnel ==
- Bobby Campbell – mixing engineer, recording engineer, studio personnel (all tracks)
- Dave Kutch – mastering engineer, studio personnel (all tracks)
- Kyle Metcalfe – recording engineer, studio personnel (tracks 3, 8)
- Coop the Truth – keyboards (track 5)
- Kory Fernie – keyboards (track 5)
- Justin Zim – guitar (track 5)
- FnZ
  - Finatik – keyboards (track 6)
  - Zac – keyboards (track 6)

== Charts ==
Chart performance for Bobby Tarantino III
Chart (2021)	Peak position
Australian Albums (ARIA)	51
Belgian Albums (Ultratop Flanders)	146
Canadian Albums (Billboard)	36
Lithuanian Albums (AGATA)	69
New Zealand Albums (RMNZ)	37
Swiss Albums (Schweizer Hitparade)	42
UK Albums (OCC)	91
US Billboard 200	26
US Top R&B/Hip-Hop Albums (Billboard)	16
