= Homicide (song) =

Song by Logic

Single by Logic featuring Eminem

from the album Confessions of a Dangerous Mind
- Released: May 3, 2019
- Recorded: 2019
- Genre: Hip-hop
- Length: 4:05
- Label: Visionary; Def Jam
- Songwriters: Sir Robert Bryson Hall II; Marshall Mathers; Dillan Beau Ballard; Donnell Stephens III; Jeremy Alexander Uribe; Tim Schoegje
- Producers: Bregma, Shroom

Logic singles chronology
"Confessions of a Dangerous Mind" (2019)	"Homicide" (2019)	"ISIS" (2019)

Eminem singles chronology
"Lucky You" (2018)	"Homicide" (2019)	"Darkness" (2020)

Music video
- "Homicide" on YouTube

Audio sample
- "Homicide": file; help

"Homicide" is a song by American rapper Logic featuring fellow American rapper Eminem. It was released on May 3, 2019, by Visionary and Def Jam as the third single from his fifth album Confessions of a Dangerous Mind (2019). The song has both artists mocking and criticizing contemporary rappers for their mumble delivery and overreliance on AutoTune and ghostwriters. "Homicide" reached number two on the Hot R&B/Hip-Hop Songs chart, giving Logic his third top 5 hit on that chart. It also gave him his second top 10 hit on the Hot 100 chart, peaking at number five. The song also charted in countries like Australia, Finland, New Zealand and the UK. The song was certified Gold and Platinum by the British Phonographic Industry (BPI) and Recording Industry Association of America (RIAA) respectively. An accompanying music video for the song features appearances from Chauncey Leopardi and Chris D'Elia portraying stunt doubles of both artists respectively.

== Background ==
May 1, 2019, Logic announced the song on his social media while simultaneously unveiling the artwork and revealing its release date to be May 3. The song's artwork resembles the cover art of previous singles thus it was believed to appear on Confessions of a Dangerous Mind. This was confirmed on May 8. The song marks the first collaboration between the two rappers.

== Composition ==
In the song, Logic and Eminem deliver their flow and speech on a quick rate. The two rappers, especially the latter, mock contemporary rappers in their lyrics. They also criticize how modern day rappers mumble, overuse AutoTune, and how they songwrite with the help of ghostwriters.

== Music video ==
The official music video was released on June 28, 2019. The music video features appearances from Chauncey Leopardi and Chris D'Elia, both portraying Logic and Eminem's stunt doubles respectively. The music video ends with a 45-second clip of Eminem spoofing comedian Chris D'Elia imitating him, taken from a video that D'Elia had posted on YouTube in September 2018.

== Commercial performance ==
In the US, "Homicide" debuted at number five on the Billboard Hot 100, becoming Logic's second top ten hit, following the number three peak of "1-800-273-8255". It fell out of the top ten the next week. Elsewhere, it also debuted and peaked in the top ten in Australia, Finland and New Zealand, as well as reaching the top twenty in the UK.

== Personnel ==
Credits adapted from Tidal.

- Bregma – production, composition
  - Dillan Beau Ballard
  - Donnell Stephens III
  - Jeremy Alexander Uribe
- Robert Campbell – mixing, recording engineer
- Chris D'Elia – additional vocals
- Eminem – vocals, composition
- Smokey Hall – background vocals
- Logic – vocals, composition
- Shroom – co-production, composition

== Charts ==
=== Weekly charts ===
Chart (2019)	Peak position
Australia (ARIA)	6
Austria (Ö3 Austria Top 40)	16
Belgium (Ultratip Bubbling Under Flanders)	7
Belgium (Ultratip Bubbling Under Wallonia)	28
Canada Hot 100 (Billboard)	5
Czech Republic Singles Digital (ČNS IFPI)	12
Denmark (Tracklisten)	27
Finland (Suomen virallinen lista)	8
France (SNEP)	152
Germany (GfK)	38
Greece International Digital Singles (IFPI)	2
Hungary (Single Top 40)	10
Hungary (Stream Top 40)	4
Ireland (IRMA)	12
Italy (FIMI)	36
Latvia (LAIPA)	3
Lithuania (AGATA)	3
Netherlands (Single Top 100)	37
New Zealand (Recorded Music NZ)	4
Norway (VG-lista)	8
Portugal (AFP)	12
Scotland Singles (OCC)	21
Slovakia Singles Digital (ČNS IFPI)	4
Sweden (Sverigetopplistan)	14
Switzerland (Schweizer Hitparade)	12
UK Singles (OCC)	15
US Billboard Hot 100	5
US Hot R&B/Hip-Hop Songs (Billboard)	2

=== Year-end charts ===
Chart (2019)	Position
US Hot R&B/Hip-Hop Songs (Billboard)	85

== Certifications ==
Region	Certification	Certified units/sales
Brazil (Pro-Música Brasil)	Platinum	40,000^{‡}
Denmark (IFPI Danmark)	Gold	45,000^{‡}
New Zealand (RMNZ)	2× Platinum	60,000^{‡}
United Kingdom (BPI)	Gold	400,000^{‡}
United States (RIAA)	2× Platinum	2,000,000^{‡}
^{‡} Sales+streaming figures based on certification alone.
