= Confessions of a Dangerous Mind (song) =

Single by American rapper Logic

Single by Logic

from the album Confessions of a Dangerous Mind
- Released: March 22, 2019
- Recorded: 2019
- Genre: Hip-hop
- Length: 4:45
- Label: Visionary; Def Jam
- Songwriters: Sir Robert Bryson Hall II; Arjun Ivatury
- Producer: 6ix

Logic singles chronology
"Keanu Reeves" (2019)	"Confessions of a Dangerous Mind" (2019)	"Homicide" (2019)

Music video
- "Confessions of a Dangerous Mind" on YouTube

"Confessions of a Dangerous Mind" is the title track and second single from American rapper Logic's fifth studio album of the same name. It was released on March 19, 2019, by Visionary Music Group and Def Jam Recordings. The Music video for the track was released simultaneously via social media.

== Music video ==
The music video features a single take mid-shot of Logic rapping, and while bleeding profusely via a wound on his neck. Logic eventually spreads the blood on his face and hands.

== Charts ==
Chart (2019)	Peak position
Canada (Canadian Hot 100)	69
Lithuania (AGATA)	66
New Zealand Hot Singles (RMNZ)	6
US Billboard Hot 100	78
US Hot R&B/Hip-Hop Songs (Billboard)	31

== Certifications ==
Region	Certification	Certified units/sales
United States (RIAA)	Gold	500,000^{‡}
^{‡} Sales+streaming figures based on certification alone.
