= Start Again (OneRepublic song) =

Single by OneRepublic featuring Logic

from the album 13 Reasons Why: Season 2
- Released: May 15, 2018
- Length: 2:45
- Label: Mosley; Interscope
- Songwriters: Ryan Tedder; Anita Blay; Danny Majic; Jez Ashurst; Justin Franks; Sir Robert Bryson Hall II; Alex Stacey
- Producers: Ryan Tedder; DJ Frank E; Danny Majic

OneRepublic singles chronology
"Stranger Things" (2018)	"Start Again" (2018)	"Connection" (2018)

Logic singles chronology
"Pray" (2018)	"Start Again" (2018)	"One Day" (2018)

Music video
- "Start Again" on YouTube

"Start Again" is a song by American band OneRepublic, featuring American rapper Logic. The song was released on May 15, 2018, as a single from the Season 2 soundtrack of the TV series 13 Reasons Why. The track was released through record labels Mosley Music Group and Interscope Records. "Start Again" was written by OneRepublic frontman Ryan Tedder, Logic, Anita Blay, Danny Majic, Jez Ashurst, DJ Frank E, and Alex Stacey. Production was handled by Tedder, Majic, and Frank E. The video for the track was released on June 22, 2018, through OneRepublic's YouTube channel.

== Music video ==
The music video was released on June 22, 2018. The video starts with a man wearing a gas mask. It works as a warning, as a reflection of near reality in its profound crisis. It reflects the possible outcome of manmade destruction of the Earth by going to war. Nevertheless, in the last scene, it is revealed that the man was imagining all the destruction in his mind. At the very end, the man saw the television showing the consequences of global warming.

== Track listing ==
Digital download
No.	Title	Length
1.	"Start Again" (featuring Logic)	2:45

Digital download
No.	Title	Length
1.	"Start Again" (with Vegas Jones)	2:42

== Charts ==
Original version

Chart (2018–2019)	Peak position
Australia (ARIA)	67
Austria (Ö3 Austria Top 40)	72
Canada Hot 100 (Billboard)	94
Germany (GfK)	87
Ireland (IRMA)	52
New Zealand Heatseekers (RMNZ)	4
Norway (VG-lista)	36
Portugal (AFP)	48
Switzerland (Schweizer Hitparade)	53

Duet Version

Chart (2018)	Peak position
Italy (FIMI)	35

== Certifications ==
Region	Certification	Certified units/sales
Australia (ARIA)	Gold	35,000^{‡}
Brazil (Pro-Música Brasil)	Gold	20,000^{‡}
Italy (FIMI) Vegas Jones version	Platinum	50,000^{‡}
United States (RIAA)	Gold	500,000^{‡}
^{‡} Sales+streaming figures based on certification alone.

== Release history ==
Region	Date	Format	Version	Label	Ref.
Various	26 July 2018	Digital download; streaming	Original	Mosley Music Group; Interscope	
Italy	15 June 2018	Contemporary hit radio	Duet Version	Universal	
Various	22 June 2018	Digital download	Duet Version	Mosley Music Group; Interscope Records; Universal Music Italy	
