= Fade Away (Logic song) =

Single by Logic

from the album The Incredible True Story
- Released: November 5, 2015
- Recorded: 2014
- Genre: Hip-hop; trap
- Length: 3:19 (single version); 4:47 (album version)
- Label: Visionary; Def Jam
- Songwriters: Sir Robert Hall II; Gene Puerling; Steven Blum; Kevin Randolph; Anna Palchikoff; Sean Anderson
- Producer: Logic

Logic singles chronology
"Like Woah" (2015)	"Fade Away" (2015)	"Flexicution" (2016)

"Fade Away" is a song by American rapper Logic. The song was released on November 5, 2015 by Visionary Music Group and Def Jam Recordings as the third single from his second studio album, The Incredible True Story. The track was written and produced by Logic himself. The song samples "I'm Gone" by Logic and "Deck the Halls" performed by The Singers Unlimited.

== Background ==
Logic said in an interview with Genius that "“Fade Away” is about accepting death and that no matter who you are, what historical figure, any of that, one day your name will be forgotten. Whether a comet hits the Earth or we all repopularize one day, you'll be forgotten. Do something for you before you fade away."

== Versions ==
In December of 2022, Logic appeared on Norah Jones Is Playing Along podcast, where Norah Jones and Logic collaborated on several of his songs. Their version of "Fade Away" was shared to YouTube and Spotify, among other sites.

== Charts ==
=== Weekly charts ===
Chart (2015)	Peak position
US Bubbling Under Hot 100 (Billboard)	25
US Hot R&B/Hip-Hop Songs (Billboard)	44

== Certifications ==
Region	Certification	Certified units/sales
United States (RIAA)	Platinum	1,000,000^{‡}
^{‡} Sales+streaming figures based on certification alone.

== Release history ==
Region	Date	Format	Ref.
United States	November 5, 2015	Digital download	
