= Young Sinatra: Welcome to Forever =

Mixtape by Logic
- Released: May 7, 2013
- Recorded: 2012–2013
- Genre: Hip-hop
- Length: 73:55
- Label: Visionary
- Producers: Logic; 6ix; Swiff D; C-Sick; Don Cannon; Key Wane; Arthur McArthur; Kevin Randolph; No I.D.

Logic chronology
| Young Sinatra: Undeniable (2012) | Young Sinatra: Welcome to Forever (2013) | Under Pressure (2014) |

Young Sinatra: Welcome to Forever is the fourth mixtape by American rapper Logic. It was released as a free online download by Visionary on May 7, 2013 and is the third installment in the Young Sinatra series, following Young Sinatra and Young Sinatra: Undeniable. The mixtape was downloaded over 100,000 times on DatPiff in less than a day and has garnered over 1,000,000 downloads on DatPiff since its release. This project was followed by Logic's fourth studio album YSIV (Young Sinatra IV), with the latter not being credited as a mixtape.

== Background ==
In the lead up to the mixtape, Logic released music videos for "Walk On By" and "Nasty". In an interview with MTV Hive about his features on the mixtape, Logic said that,

"I love to give the people what they want and that's me. I don’t mean that to sound arrogant but when you listen to someone's music it's them you want to hear [and] not a million and one other people. So if there are features you want them to make sense and have them as something that people are going to be excited for whether they're unexpected or not".

The mixtape features guest appearances from his 2013 XXL Freshmen class Kid Ink, Trinidad James and Dizzy Wright along with Jhené Aiko, Elijah Blake, Castro and Jon Bellion.

== Production ==
Producers who contributed to the mixtape included Logic himself, 6ix, Swiff D, C-Sick, Don Cannon, Key Wane, Arthur McArthur, Kevin Randolph, and No I.D.

== Critical reception ==
Young Sinatra: Welcome to Forever received critical acclaim from music critics. HipHopDX's consensus determined the project as a "free album," their highest possible praise for a mixtape on the site. DJBooth agreed with HipHopDX in saying Young Sinatra: Welcome to Forever had top notch production and sounded like an album. Edwin Ortiz of HipHopDX found Logic's fourth effort as an indication of his vision, saying, "In a little over three years Logic has gone from a young lyricist with raw potential to a legitimate rap artist with Welcome to Forever." Multiple sources state that Logic's cohesive lyricism has never been a point of question. His music is versatile and diverse, which can be said is the tape's strongest appeal. DJBooth.net felt the project was relatable, introspective, and honest and also said, "his wordplay is potent and when he gets on his lyrical tip, it's hard to argue that he isn't on top of this game." BET's Jake Rohn gave the mixtape 4 out of 5 stars, saying it showcased Logic's remarkable growth and adaptability.

== Track listing ==
| No. | Title | Producer(s) | Length |
|---|---|---|---|
| 1. | "Welcome to Forever" (featuring Jon Bellion) | 6ix | 4:17 |
| 2. | "925" | Swiff D | 3:17 |
| 3. | "Roll Call" | Earthtone III | 2:54 |
| 4. | "5AM" | C-Sick | 3:40 |
| 5. | "Break It Down" (featuring Jhené Aiko) | C-Sick | 3:42 |
| 6. | "Feel Good" | Logic | 2:45 |
| 7. | "Saturday (skit)" (featuring John “Pops” Witherspoon) | | 2:11 |
| 8. | "On the Low" (featuring Kid Ink and Trinidad James) | Swiff D | 4:13 |
| 9. | "Walk On By" | C-Sick | 4:06 |
| 10. | "The Come Up" | 6ix | 2:59 |
| 11. | "Nasty" | Don Cannon | 3:35 |
| 12. | "Life Is Good" | Key Wane | 4:03 |
| 13. | "Randolph Returns (skit)" | | 1:53 |
| 14. | "Ballin" (featuring Castro) | Arthur McArthur | 3:49 |
| 15. | "Young Jedi" (featuring Dizzy Wright) | 6ix | 4:41 |
| 16. | "The High Life" (featuring Elijah Blake) | Kevin Randolph | 4:59 |
| 17. | "Common Logic / Midnight Marauder" | C-Sick; Logic | 4:19 |
| 18. | "Just a Man" | Kevin Randolph | 4:07 |
| 19. | "Man of the Year" | No I.D. | 4:56 |
| 20. | "The End" | Kevin Randolph; C-Sick | 3:29 |

Sample credits

- "Welcome to Forever" samples "Never More" performed by Shoji Meguro, "Pray" performed by Jay-Z and Beyonce, and "GOOD Friday" performed by Kanye West featuring Big Sean, Charlie Wilson, Common, Kid Cudi and Pusha T.
- "925" samples "Mad Crew" performed by KRS-One, and "Backseat Freestyle" performed by Kendrick Lamar.
- "Roll Call" samples "Ms. Jackson" performed by Outkast.
- "Feel Good" samples "GOOD Friday" performed by Kanye West featuring Big Sean, Charlie Wilson, Common, Kid Cudi and Pusha T.
- "Saturday" samples "It Was A Good Day" performed by Ice Cube, "My Girl" performed by The Temptations, and "Never, Never Gonna Give Ya Up" performed by Barry White.
- "Walk On By" samples "Walk On By" performed by Dionne Warwick.
- "The Come Up" samples "The Last Time" performed by Oliver Tank, and it contains an interpolations from Rocky and Kid Cudi.
- "Nasty" samples "Nasty" performed by The Eleventh Hour, and "Power" performed by Kanye West and Dwele.
- "Life Is Good" samples "The Highways of My Life" performed by The Isley Brothers.
- "Young Jedi" samples "Completeness" performed by Minnie Riperton.
- "The High Life" samples "Over My Dead Body" performed by Drake.
- "Common Logic / Midnight Marauder" interpolates "What Music Worth, According to My Mom" on YouTube, and samples “Award Tour” and “Sucka Nigga” performed by A Tribe Called Quest, "Humbling Love" performed by John Klemmer, "Living Together Is Keeping Us Apart" performed by Clarence Reid, and "Do That Stuff" performed by Parliament interpolations from Started from the bottom performed by Drake.
- "Just a Man" samples "My Kind of Town" performed by Frank Sinatra.
- "Man of the Year" samples "Long Red" performed by Mountain.
- "The End" samples "Skyfall" performed by Adele.
