= Confessions of a Dangerous Mind (album) =

Studio album by Logic
- Released: May 10, 2019
- Genre: Hip-hop
- Length: 55:25
- Label: Def Jam; Visionary
- Producer: 6ix (also exec.); AG; Andre Hotbox; Bregma; Cubeatz; DJ Khalil; Dreamlife; Frank Dukes; G Koop; Haze; Illmind; J.LBS; Kajo; Keanu Beats; Logic; Shroom; STACKTRACE; Tee-WaTT; Timmy Holiday

Logic chronology
Supermarket (2019)	Confessions of a Dangerous Mind (2019)	No Pressure (2020)

Singles from Confessions of a Dangerous Mind
- 1. "Keanu Reeves" Released: January 18, 2019; 2. "Confessions of a Dangerous Mind" Released: March 22, 2019; 3. "Homicide" Released: May 3, 2019

Confessions of a Dangerous Mind is the fifth studio album by American rapper Logic. The album was announced on March 19, 2019, with a video for the album's title track. It was released on May 10, 2019, by Def Jam Recordings and Visionary Music Group. Confessions of a Dangerous Mind was Logic's second release in less than two months, following Supermarket in March, which served as a soundtrack for the novel of the same name.

The album features guest appearances from rappers Eminem, Gucci Mane, G-Eazy, Will Smith, Wiz Khalifa, and DMV native YBN Cordae, along with vocals from Logic's father Smokey Hall, who is credited as "My Dad". Meanwhile, production was handled by Logic's frequent producer 6ix, who serves as an executive producer, while additional production came from Cubeatz, DJ Khalil, Frank Dukes, Haze, and Illmind, among others. Despite sales being lower than those of his other projects, the album debuted at number one on the US Billboard 200, making it Logic's third project to reach the top of the chart.

== Release and promotion ==
The album's first single, "Keanu Reeves", was released on January 18, 2019. The music video for the album's second single, "Confessions of a Dangerous Mind", was released on March 19, 2019, with the song being released three days later on March 22. The album's third single, "Homicide", was released on May 3, and featured a guest verse from Eminem. The album's release date and artwork were revealed on May 8, via social media. The album's track list was announced the following day. On May 10, the album was released along with its fourth single, "Icy" featuring Gucci Mane.

== Critical reception ==
Professional ratings
Aggregate scores
Source	Rating
Metacritic	65/100
Review scores
Source	Rating
AllMusic	3/5 stars
Exclaim!	7/10
Highsnobiety	2/5
HipHopDX	2.9/5
HotNewHipHop	73%

Confessions of a Dangerous Mind received generally positive reviews from music critics. At Metacritic, which assigns a normalized rating out of 100 to reviews from mainstream publications, the album received an average score of 65, based on four reviews. In a positive review, Kyle Mullin of Exclaim! gave the album seven out of ten stars, particularly praising the album's title track, but criticizing the album's lack of substance: "Fun and compelling as such high points can be, nothing on this album reaches the strata of the title track. If Confessions of a Dangerous Mind had a few more compelling confessions and vulnerable couplets, then Logic wouldn't need to impress us with flexes like a Fresh Prince feature." In a mixed review, Daniel Spielberger of HipHopDX gave the album a 2.9 out of 5, stating "For some artists, being self-aware is humanizing. While for others, it can just illuminate their insecurities. Logic's fifth studio album Confessions of a Dangerous Mind is an unfortunate example of the latter scenario." Many fans have criticized the album for its lack of substance, including Charlamagne tha God during a guest appearance on Lisa Ramos and Camille Fishel's Pizza and Chill podcast. Logic called out Charlamagne as "shameless" in the album's track "Clickbait."

== Commercial performance ==
Confessions of a Dangerous Mind debuted at number one on the US Billboard 200 with 80,000 album-equivalent units, including 24,000 pure album sales in its first week. It is Logic's third US number-one album. In its second week, the album dropped to number eight on the chart, earning 29,000 units.

== Track listing ==
Credits adapted from Tidal and Spotify.

No.	Title	Writer(s)	Producer(s)	Length
1.	"Confessions of a Dangerous Mind"	Sir Robert Bryson Hall II; Arjun Ivatury	6ix	4:44
2.	"Homicide" (featuring Eminem)	Hall; Marshall Mathers III; Dillan Beau Bailard; Donnell Stephens III; Jeremy Alexander Uribe; Tim Schoegje	Bregma; Shroom	4:05
3.	"Wannabe"	Hall; Rashad Muhammad	HAZE	1:18
4.	"Clickbait"	Hall; Ivatury; Ramon Ibanga, Jr.	6ix; Illmind	2:36
5.	"Mama / Show Love" (featuring Cordae)	Hall; Cordae Dunston; Ivatury; Aaron Gomez; Adam Feeney; Lawrence Parker	6ix; AG; Frank Dukes	4:01
6.	"Out of Sight"	Hall; Andre Brisett; Jason Pounds	J.LBS; Andre Hotbox	2:17
7.	"Pardon My Ego"	Hall; Ivatury; Kevin Gomringer; Tim Gomringer	6ix; Cubeatz	2:53
8.	"Commando" (featuring G-Eazy)	Hall; Gerald Gillum; Ivatury	6ix	3:31
9.	"Icy" (featuring Gucci Mane)	Hall; Radric Davis; Ivatury; Arkae Tuazon	Logic; 6ix; Kajo	4:25
10.	"Still Ballin'" (featuring Wiz Khalifa)	Hall; Cameron Thomaz; Ivatury	6ix; Keanu Beats^{[b]}	3:59
11.	"Cocaine"	Hall; Ivatury; K. Gomringer; T. Gomringer	6ix; Cubeatz	2:54
12.	"Limitless"	Hall; Ivatury; Terry Kevontay Watson	6ix; Tee-WaTT	4:04
13.	"Keanu Reeves"	Hall; Ivatury; Gomez	6ix; AG	3:46
14.	"Don't Be Afraid to Be Different" (featuring Will Smith)	Hall; Will Smith; Ivatury; Jeffrey Townes; Khalil Abdul-Rahman; Manuela Kamosi; Omarr Rambert; Thomas De Quincey	6ix; DJ Khalil^{[b]}	2:47
15.	"Bobby" (featuring My Dad)	Hall; Ivatury; Ophlin Russell-Meyers; Winston Riley	6ix	2:47
16.	"Lost in Translation"	Hall; Ivatury	Logic; 6ix; Dreamlife; STACKTRACE; G Koop; Timmy Holiday	4:49
Total length:				55:25

Notes

- ^{^[a]} signifies a co-producer
- ^{^[b]} signifies an uncredited additional producer
- "Homicide" features additional vocals by Chris D'Elia and Smokey Hall
- "Clickbait" is stylized in lowercase.
- "Commando" and "Bobby" are stylized in all caps.
- "Bobby" credits featured vocals by Smokey Hall as "My Dad"

Sample credits

- "Mama / Show Love" contains a sample from "Mad Crew", written by Lawrence Parker, and performed by KRS-One; samples from "Under Pressure", written by Sir Robert Bryson Hall II, Minta Notini, Lindsey Lohan, Rob Kinelski, Adam Gusterson, Robert Mellin, Guy Wood, George Clinton, William Collins, Lorenzo Patterson, Abrim Tilmon, Bernard Worrell, Eric Wright, Andre Young, Steve Wyreman, Claire Courchene, and Kevin Randolph, and performed by Logic; and samples from "Lavish Lullaby", written by Micah Davis, and performed by Masego.
- "Still Ballin" contains interpolations from "Ballin", written by Sir Robert Bryson Hall II and Christopher Julian Castro, and performed by Logic.
- "Don't Be Afraid to Be Different" contains interpolations from "Pump Up the Jam", written by Manuela Kamosi and Thomas De Quincey, and performed by Technotronic; and an interpolation from "The Fresh Prince of Bel-Air theme", written by Quincy Jones and Will Smith, and performed by DJ Jazzy Jeff & The Fresh Prince.
- "Bobby" contains interpolations from "Bam Bam", written by Ophlin Russell-Meyers and Winston Riley, and performed by Sister Nancy.

== Charts ==
=== Weekly charts ===
Chart (2019)	Peak position
Australian Albums (ARIA)	12
Belgian Albums (Ultratop Flanders)	29
Belgian Albums (Ultratop Wallonia)	186
Canadian Albums (Billboard)	2
Danish Albums (Hitlisten)	18
Dutch Albums (Album Top 100)	11
Finnish Albums (Suomen virallinen lista)	9
French Albums (SNEP)	109
German Albums (Offizielle Top 100)	76
Irish Albums (IRMA)	14
Italian Albums (FIMI)	91
Latvian Albums (LAIPA)	3
Lithuanian Albums (AGATA)	2
New Zealand Albums (RMNZ)	14
Norwegian Albums (VG-lista)	8
Scottish Albums (OCC)	67
Swedish Albums (Sverigetopplistan)	24
Swiss Albums (Schweizer Hitparade)	19
UK Albums (OCC)	12
US Billboard 200	1
US Top R&B/Hip-Hop Albums (Billboard)	1

=== Year-end charts ===
Chart (2019)	Position
US Billboard 200	186
US Top R&B/Hip-Hop Albums (Billboard)	74

== Certifications ==
Certifications for Confessions of a Dangerous Mind
Region	Certification	Certified units/sales
United States (RIAA)	Gold	500,000^{‡}
^{‡} Sales+streaming figures based on certification alone.
