= 1-800-273-8255 (song) =

2017 single by Logic

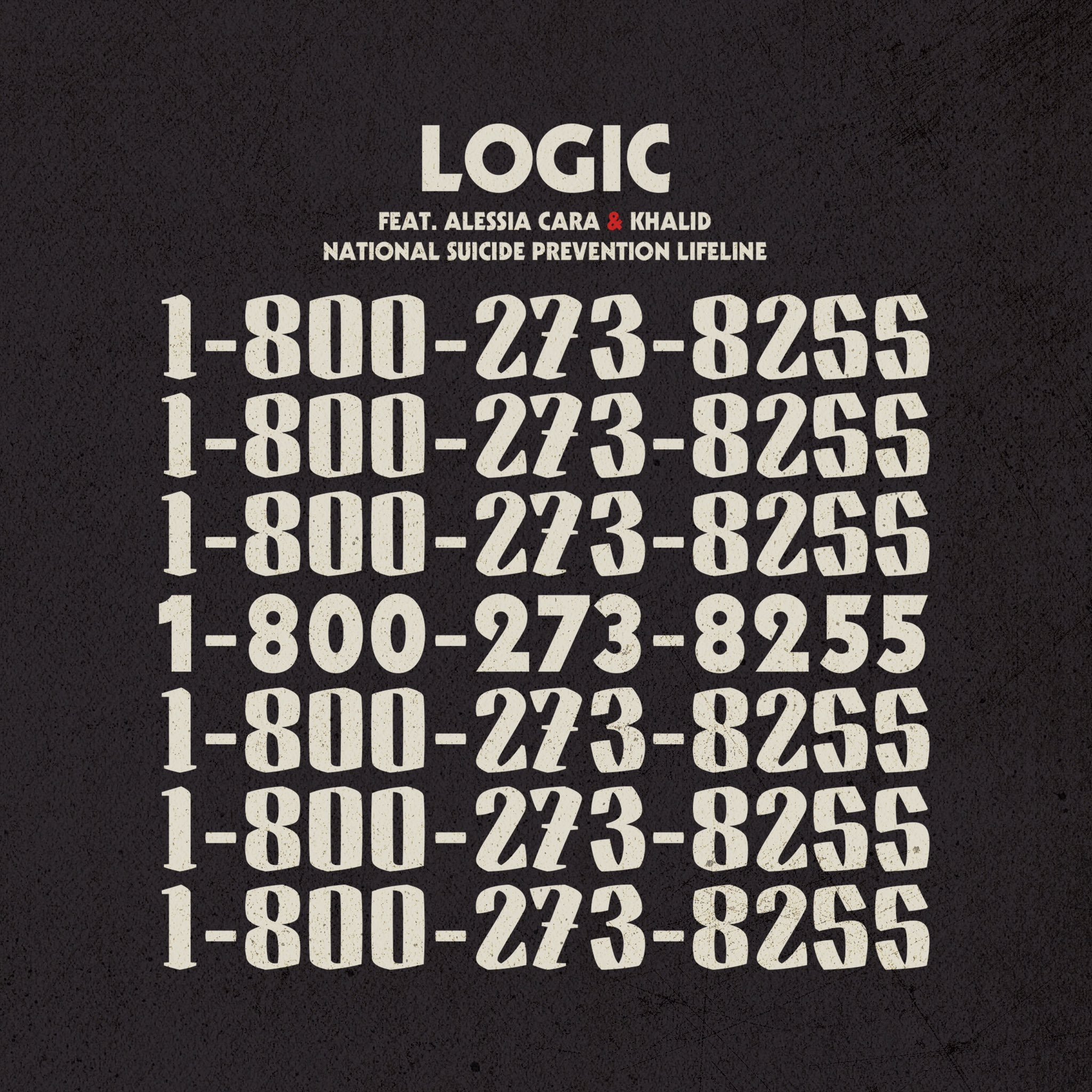

Single by Logic featuring Alessia Cara and Khalid

from the album Everybody
- Released: April 27, 2017
- Genre: Pop; conscious hip-hop; pop-rap
- Length: 4:10
- Label: Visionary; Def Jam
- Songwriters: Sir Robert Bryson Hall II; Dylan Wiggins; Arjun Ivatury; Alessia Caracciolo; Khalid Robinson; Drew Taggart
- Producers: Logic; 6ix

Logic singles chronology
"Black Spiderman" (2017)	"1-800-273-8255" (2017)	"You Can Count On Me" (2017)

Alessia Cara singles chronology
"Stay" (2017)	"1-800-273-8255" (2017)	"Growing Pains" (2018)

Khalid singles chronology
"Electric" (2017)	"1-800-273-8255" (2017)	"Rollin" (2017)

Audio sample
- file; help

Music video
- "1-800-273-8255" on YouTube

"1-800-273-8255" (also known simply as "1-800") is a song by American rapper Logic featuring Canadian singer-songwriter Alessia Cara and American singer-songwriter Khalid. It was released on April 27, 2017, through Visionary Music Group and Def Jam Recordings, as the third single from Logic's third studio album, Everybody. The song's title is the previous phone number for the American National Suicide Prevention Lifeline (NSPL), now known as the 988 Suicide & Crisis Lifeline. Although the lifeline later changed its phone number to the simpler "988" in July 2022, the original number remains active. The song was written by its three performers alongside Dylan Wiggins, Drew Taggart of The Chainsmokers, and 6ix, the latter of whom produced the track with Logic. "1-800-273-8255" eventually peaked at number 3 on the US Billboard Hot 100 and received nominations for Song of the Year and Best Music Video at the 60th Annual Grammy Awards.

== Background ==
In an interview with Genius, Logic said:

...The first hook and verse is from the perspective of someone who is calling the hotline and they want to commit suicide. They want to kill themselves. They want to end their life. When I jumped on a tour bus that started in Los Angeles, California and I ended in New York City and did a fan tour where I went to fans' houses and shared meals with them, hung out with them, played them my album before it came out. Them along with other people on tour, just fans that I met randomly, they've said things like, "Your music has saved my life. You've saved my life." And I was always like, "Aw so nice of you. Thanks." And I give them a hug and shit but in my mind, I'm like, "What the fuck?" And they're really serious. And they tat shit on their arms and get shit like lyrics that save their life and in my mind, I was like, "Man I wasn't even trying to save nobody's life." And then it hit me, the power that I have as an artist with a voice. I wasn't even trying to save your life. Now what can happen if I actually did?

== Music video ==
The song's accompanying music video premiered on August 17, 2017, on Logic's Vevo channel on YouTube. The music video was directed by Andy Hines and centers around a young man who struggles with thoughts of suicide due to issues of acceptance surrounding his sexuality. The video features appearances from Coy Stewart, Nolan Gould, Bonnie Burroughs, Don Cheadle, Luis Guzmán, Matthew Modine, and Mickaëlle X. Bizet.

== Commercial performance ==
"1-800-273-8255" debuted at number 61 on the US Billboard Hot 100 and number 67 the Canadian Hot 100 for the chart dated May 20, 2017. Following the album's release it went up to number 47 and 40 respectively. On August 20, 2018, the single was certified quintuple platinum by the Recording Industry Association of America (RIAA) for combined sales and streaming equivalent units of over five million units in the United States. Following the song's performance at the 2017 MTV Video Music Awards, the song jumped to number nine, becoming Logic and Khalid's first top 10 single, and Alessia Cara's fourth. It later reached the top three on the Billboard Hot 100, becoming all three's highest-charting single; it performed well at radio, especially contemporary hit radio, where it reached number three on the Mainstream Top 40.

== Impact ==
According to the National Suicide Prevention Lifeline (NSPL), in the three weeks following the single's release, calls directed to the NSPL rose by 27%, while visits to their website increased from 300,000 to 400,000 over the following months. According to Billboard, the hotline received the second-highest daily call volume ever with over 4,573 calls on the day that the song was released.

Lifeline's Director of Communications Frances Gonzalez reported that, following the night of the 2017 MTV Video Music Awards, the NSPL experienced a 50% surge in the number of calls to their hotline. This was reportedly as a result of the performance of the song by Logic, Cara, and Khalid during the show as well as the speech given by recording artist and activist Kesha, who was tasked with presenting the performers.

During the 60th Annual Grammy Awards, Logic performed the song alongside Alessia Cara and Khalid, as a tribute to Soundgarden lead vocalist Chris Cornell and Linkin Park lead vocalist Chester Bennington, who both died by suicide in 2017. It was performed after the annual in memoriam tribute, which ended with Bennington. Logic concluded his performance by making an extended statement, proclaiming his support for gender equality and racial equality while saying "black is beautiful" compared to how "hate is ugly".

A December 2021 article in the British Medical Journal found that each of these events — the release of "1-800-273-8255", the performance during the 2017 MTV Video Music Awards, and the 2018 Grammys performance — was correlated with increases in calls to the helpline, and with a reduction in suicides overall.

== Remix ==
A Spanish remix featuring Colombian singer Juanes was released on October 13, 2017. Rapper Lil Durk has also remixed the hit single on his mixtape Just Cause Y'all Waited and titled it "1 (773) Vulture".

== Charts ==
=== Weekly charts ===
Chart (2017–2018)	Peak position
Australia (ARIA)	5
Australia Urban (ARIA)	1
Austria (Ö3 Austria Top 40)	42
Belgium (Ultratop 50 Flanders)	36
Belgium (Ultratop 50 Wallonia)	17
Canada Hot 100 (Billboard)	6
Czech Republic Singles Digital (ČNS IFPI)	17
Denmark (Tracklisten)	2
Finland (Suomen virallinen lista)	15
France (SNEP)	88
Germany (GfK)	45
Hungary (Stream Top 40)	26
Ireland (IRMA)	9
Italy (FIMI)	65
Latvia (DigiTop100)	16
Malaysia (RIM)	19
Netherlands (Dutch Top 40)	23
Netherlands (Single Top 100)	23
New Zealand (Recorded Music NZ)	6
Norway (VG-lista)	8
Philippines (Philippine Hot 100)	47
Portugal (AFP)	6
Scottish Singles Sales (Official Charts)	20
Slovakia Singles Digital (ČNS IFPI)	20
Spain (PROMUSICAE)	93
Sweden (Sverigetopplistan)	4
Switzerland (Schweizer Hitparade)	50
UK Singles (Official Charts)	9
US Billboard Hot 100	3
US Adult Contemporary (Billboard)	26
US Adult Pop Airplay (Billboard)	22
US Dance Airplay (Billboard)	2
US Hot R&B/Hip-Hop Songs (Billboard)	2
US Pop Airplay (Billboard)	3
US Rhythmic Airplay (Billboard)	3

=== Year-end charts ===
Chart (2017)	Position
Australia (ARIA)	35
Canada (Canadian Hot 100)	47
Denmark (Tracklisten)	29
Hungary (Stream Top 40)	100
New Zealand (Recorded Music NZ)	35
Portugal (AFP)	30
Sweden (Sverigetopplistan)	43
UK Singles (Official Charts Company)	84
US Billboard Hot 100	31
US Hot R&B/Hip-Hop Songs (Billboard)	16
US Mainstream Top 40 (Billboard)	32
US Rhythmic Songs (Billboard)	7
Chart (2018)	Position
Portugal (AFP)	121
US Billboard Hot 100	84
US Hot R&B/Hip-Hop Songs (Billboard)	89

== Certifications ==
Region	Certification	Certified units/sales
Australia (ARIA)	3× Platinum	210,000^{‡}
Belgium (BRMA)	Gold	10,000^{‡}
Brazil (Pro-Música Brasil)	2× Platinum	120,000^{‡}
Canada (Music Canada)	5× Platinum	400,000^{‡}
Denmark (IFPI Danmark)	2× Platinum	180,000^{‡}
France (SNEP)	Platinum	200,000^{‡}
Germany (BVMI)	Gold	200,000^{‡}
Italy (FIMI)	Platinum	50,000^{‡}
New Zealand (RMNZ)	5× Platinum	150,000^{‡}
Poland (ZPAV)	Platinum	50,000^{‡}
Portugal (AFP)	Platinum	10,000^{‡}
Spain (Promusicae)	Gold	30,000^{‡}
United Kingdom (BPI)	2× Platinum	1,200,000^{‡}
United States (RIAA)	8× Platinum	8,000,000^{‡}
^{‡} Sales+streaming figures based on certification alone.

== See also ==
- 2017 in music
