= Logic (rapper) =

American rapper and singer (born 1990)

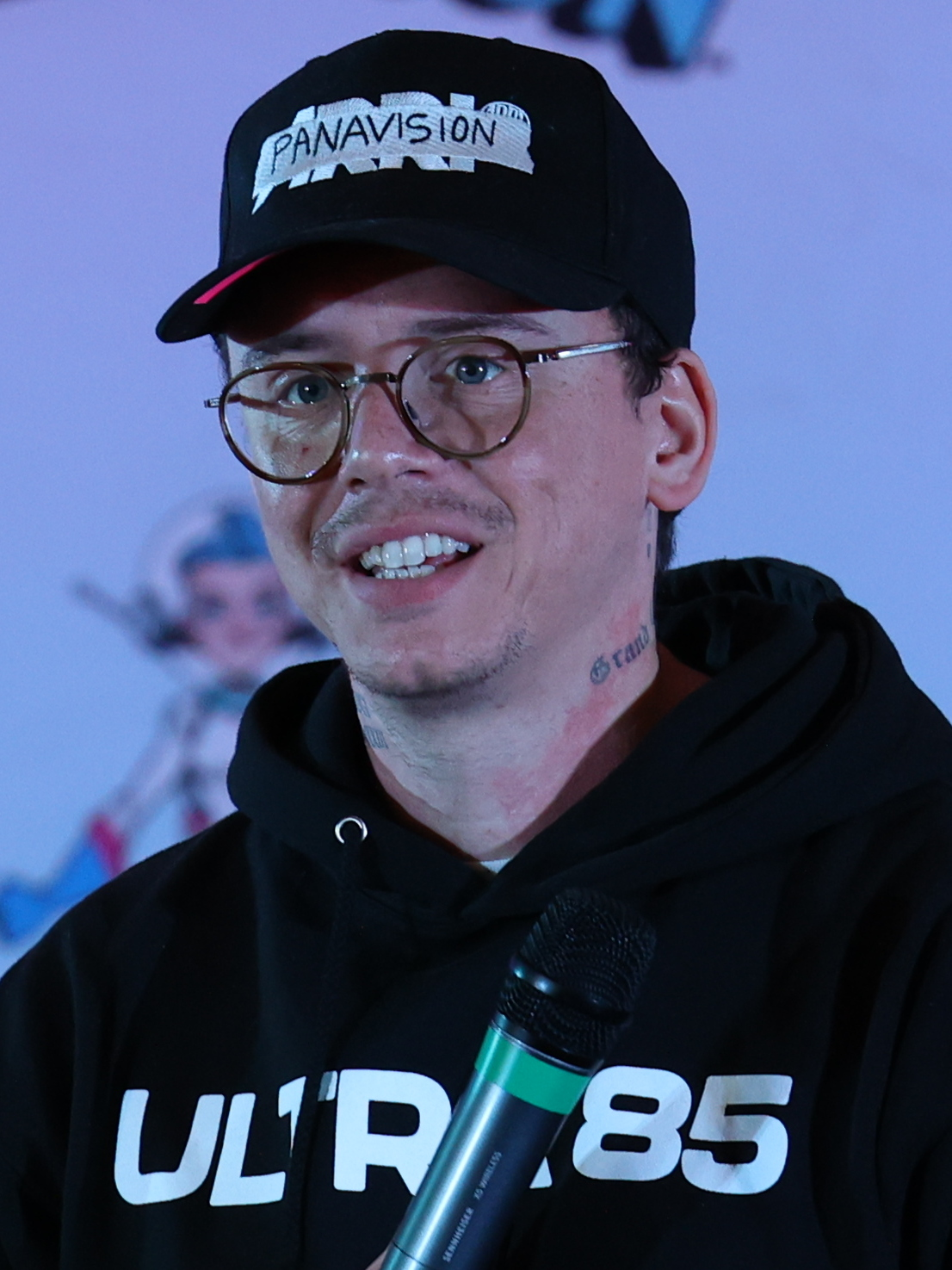
- Logic in 2024
- Born: Sir Robert Bryson Hall II (Note: "Sir" is part of Hall's given name, not an honorific title.); January 22, 1990 (age 36); Rockville, Maryland, U.S.
- Other names: Psychological; Young Sinatra; Bobby Tarantino; Doctor Destruction; PeanutsMPC; Peanuts
- Occupations: Rapper; singer; songwriter; record producer; streamer; author; writer; director; producer; actor
- Years active: 2005–present
- Spouses: Jessica Andrea (m. 2015; div. 2018) Brittney Noell (m. 2019)
- Children: 2
- Awards: Full list

Twitch information
- Channel: logic
- Years active: 2011–present
- Followers: 526,000

YouTube information
- Channel: Logic
- Years active: 2016–present
- Subscribers: 3.52 million
- Views: 1.8 billion
- Musical career
- Origin: Gaithersburg, Maryland, U.S.
- Genre: DMV hip-hop
- Works: Discography
- Labels: Boom; BobbyBoy; Three Oh One; BMG; Visionary; Def Jam
- Last updated: May 1, 2026
- Website: logicmerch.com

Sir Robert Bryson Hall II (born January 22, 1990), known professionally as Logic, is an American rapper, singer, songwriter, and record producer from Gaithersburg, Maryland. He released his debut mixtape, Psychological: The Mixtape in December 2009 under the name Psychological, which he later shortened to Logic. He gained popularity following his Young Sinatra (2011) mixtape series; its third installment, Young Sinatra: Welcome to Forever (2013) received critical acclaim and led him to secure a recording contract with Def Jam Recordings. Logic's first two studio albums—Under Pressure (2014) and The Incredible True Story (2015)—both peaked within the top five of the U.S. Billboard 200 and received platinum certifications by the Recording Industry Association of America (RIAA).

Logic's next three albums — Everybody (2017), YSIV (2018) and Confessions of a Dangerous Mind (2019) — each debuted atop the Billboard 200. The former was supported by the Billboard Hot 100 top-three single "1-800-273-8255" (featuring Alessia Cara and Khalid), while the latter spawned the top-five single "Homicide" (featuring Eminem). After his sixth album No Pressure (2020), Logic retired from music; however, his career would continue with the release of his seventh mixtape Bobby Tarantino III (2021). His seventh album, Vinyl Days (2022) was his final release with Def Jam. His eighth and ninth albums, College Park (2023) and Ultra 85 (2024), were both self-released.

Logic has received two Grammy Award nominations. As an author, he released the novel Supermarket (2019), which was accompanied with a namesake soundtrack album. The book became a New York Times Best Seller, although both works received generally unfavorable critical reception. He published his memoir, This Bright Future, in 2021. Logic is also a streamer and signed exclusively with Twitch in 2020, becoming the first musician to do so.

== Early life and education ==
Sir Robert Bryson Hall II was born on January 22, 1990, in Rockville, Maryland. He was born to Robert Bryson Hall, a black Maryland native, and a white mother. Between his father and mother, he has seven half-siblings. Logic spent much of his youth in the West Deer Park neighborhood in Gaithersburg, Maryland. His father suffered from a cocaine addiction and his mother from alcoholism. Despite his father initially being absent in his childhood, Logic was able to reconnect with Hall as his rap career developed. During his early adolescent years, Logic witnessed his brothers produce and distribute crack cocaine to "addicts all over the block", including to his father. Logic maintains that because of these experiences he knows how to accurately manufacture and produce crack cocaine .

Logic attended several high schools in Montgomery County, repeatedly moving after being expelled from multiple schools. In the tenth grade, he began missing classes and, after another expulsion, he stopped attending school altogether. Logic later said: "I started doing badly and failed every class but English, so they kicked me out of school, they gave up on me."

== Career ==
=== 2005–2012: Early career and various mixtapes ===
At the age of 13, Logic met Solomon Taylor, who would soon after become his mentor. Logic became interested in rap and hip-hop after watching the movie Kill Bill: Volume 1, directed by Quentin Tarantino. The film's score was produced by RZA, a member of the hip-hop group Wu-Tang Clan. Following this, Logic began listening to the group, and soon expressed a deep affection for hip-hop. Logic bought the Roots' album Do You Want More?!!!??! later that year, which prompted Taylor to bring Logic a large number of CDs containing instrumental beats, for him to write lyrics over. In 2009, Logic performed under the stage name "Psychological" with Logic describing the name as "one name that really stuck [with me]. I just loved this word because it was about the mind and I knew that's what I wanted my music to consist of; something that really challenges the mind". He released an unofficial mixtape entitled Psychological – Logic: The Mixtape under his original stage name. The mixtape’s success allowed Logic to serve as the opening act for artists like Pitbull, EPMD, Method Man, Redman, and Ludacris at shows all over Maryland. Soon after, he shortened the "Psychological" moniker to "Logic".

Following these initial experiences, Logic released his first official mixtape, Young, Broke & Infamous, on December 15, 2010. The mixtape was well-received by critics and was the vehicle by which his name grew among hip-hop fans. Chris Zarou, the president of Visionary Music Group, heard the mixtape and signed Logic to the independent label. Upon signing, Logic stated in an interview, "Visionary Music Group is like Roc-A-Fella. Damon Dash, that's like Chris Zarou of Visionary Music Group, I like to see myself as a Jay. In no way am I arrogant or cocky, I have to see it in order to do it. They did it independent and when they signed with a major, they did it the way that they wanted to do it". The mixtape had a confirmed download count of over 300,000 on online mixtape sharing platform DatPiff. Logic released his second mixtape, Young Sinatra, in 2011. It served as the first installment in the Young Sinatra chronology, and drew critical acclaim from a variety of publications, including XXL. The songs "All I Do" and "Mind of Logic" specifically touched on Logic's mindset. The former is about Logic's everyday workflow in his personal studio, while the latter serves as a lyrical tour of Logic's mind, discussing his desire to be the greatest. The music video for "All I Do", released on YouTube, gained over a million views in the week following its release.

After the success of these two projects, Logic released his third mixtape, Young Sinatra: Undeniable, on April 30, 2012. The mixtape was notable for Logic’s dealing with a number of personal issues, including his future, his father's drug use, his expulsion from school, and his mother getting stabbed. Speaking about the mixtape, Logic said, "Fans tend to think that if you fall in love with an artist because he makes this kind of sound [but if he gets] bigger and he grows and [his sound changes, people also think he changes]. But with me, I created all types of sounds from the get-go, so you can never say I'm changing." He commented on the musical aspects of the mixtape, stating, "There's stuff on there for the motherf***ers that don't pay attention to lyrics and just want to have fun, but every line is constructed with such depth that the real lyricists and nitpickers have something to listen to." After the release of Young Sinatra: Undeniable, Logic completed his first national headlining tour, the Visionary Music Group Tour.

=== 2012–2013: Young Sinatra: Welcome to Forever and recording contract ===
In early 2013, Logic was featured in an edition of XXL, being included as a part of the publication's annual "Top 10 Freshmen List", alongside artists Travis Scott, Trinidad James, Dizzy Wright, Action Bronson, Joey Badass, Angel Haze, Ab-Soul, Chief Keef, Kirko Bangz and Schoolboy Q. Logic completed his first European tour in March 2013, and confirmed his fourth mixtape, Young Sinatra: Welcome to Forever, would be released on May 7. He announced his second headlining national tour, the two-month-long Welcome to Forever Tour, to promote the project. The mixtape was a critical success, with critics praising the project, calling it a "free album", as well as noting the rapper's rapid growth and adaptability. The mixtape has received over 900,000 downloads on DatPiff since its release.

On April 15, it was announced that Logic had signed with Def Jam Recordings, with Def Jam producer No I.D. serving as the executive producer of his debut album. Logic released a public statement about the signing, stating, "I'm excited to take this next step in my career. It's incredible for Def Jam [Records] and Visionary Music Group to work together, and the opportunity to collaborate [with No I.D.] is priceless. I'm very humbled to be a part of the most iconic hip hop label of all time." Logic toured with Kid Cudi, fellow Def Jam signee Big Sean, and Tyler, the Creator on "The Cud Life Tour 2013", throughout the fall of the year.

=== 2013–2014: Under Pressure ===
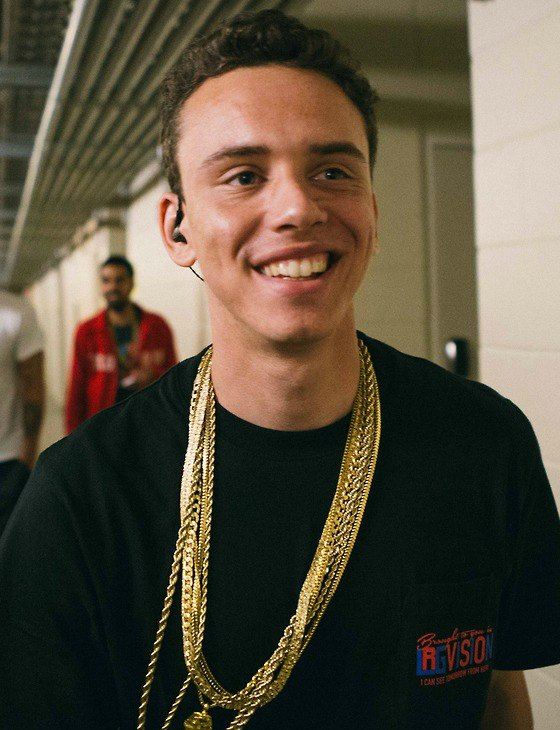
Logic in 2014

On November 5, Logic revealed that No I.D., former GOOD Music producer Hit-Boy, RattPack member 6ix, and C-Sick would be providing production on his debut record, with No I.D. and 6ix as executive producers for the album. On January 27, 2014, Visionary Music Group released the song "24 Freestyle". The song was released in celebration of Logic's birthday and serves as the first noted collaboration between all VMG artists. On February 11, Logic announced that he would be touring alongside EDM band Krewella on the 2014 Verge Campus Spring Tour. On April 8, Logic released "Now", originally scheduled to be featured on his upcoming free EP titled While You Wait. Logic embarked on the month-long While You Wait Tour alongside fellow Visionary Music Group member Quest. On April 22, he released "Alright", the third song from the While You Wait project, and features Big Sean. Logic concluded the four-track project, releasing "Finding Forever" on May 7.

In summer 2014, Logic announced that no featured artists would appear on his debut album, making it "personal [to Logic] and focused on only me". On August 27, Logic released "Driving Ms. Daisy", featuring Childish Gambino. September brought the announcements of his album title and release date, October 21. The title track, serving as the album's primary single, was released on September 15. On October 14, Logic released the second single titled "Buried Alive", which was the final single to be released as promotion for the album. On October 21, Logic released Under Pressure, selling over 70,000 copies in its first week after debuting at number four on the US Billboard 200 chart.

On November 12, Logic made his network television debut on The Tonight Show Starring Jimmy Fallon by performing "I'm Gone" alongside the Roots, 6ix, and DJ Rhetorik.

=== 2015–2016: The Incredible True Story and Bobby Tarantino ===
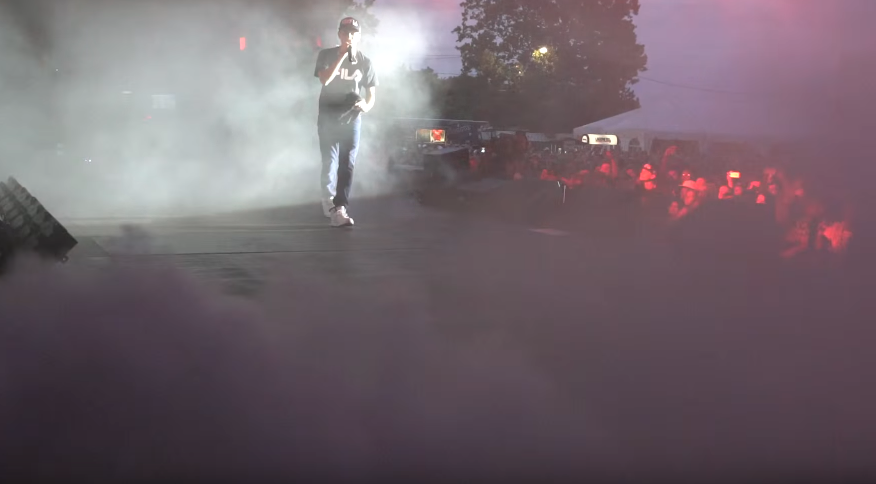
Logic performing in August 2016

On September 8, Logic released the trailer for his upcoming second studio album, announcing that the album will be released in the fall of 2015 and is considered a "motion picture sci-fi epic". The story, which takes places 100 years into the future, begins with Earth being uninhabitable due to severe human intervention. The primary characters begin traveling to a new planet called Paradise and as they travel, they play The Incredible True Story. It features Logic, Steven Blum (as Thomas), Kevin Randolph (as Kai), and Anna Elyse Palchikoff (as Thalia) as main characters, and the cast took part in a panel discussion to promote and talk about the album at New York Comic Con. Logic, Blum, Randolph, and 6ix returned to New York Comic Con in 2016 to discuss "life after The Incredible True Story.

On September 22, 2015, Logic released "Young Jesus", the lead single from the album, featuring longtime friend Big Lenbo. "Like Woah" and "Fade Away", the second and third singles from the album, were released on October 14 and November 5, respectively. The Incredible True Story was released on November 13, 2015, surpassing his debut album on the Billboard 200, debuting at number three with a combined first-week sales of 135,000. The album also topped the Top R&B/Hip-Hop Albums at number one. It was also the second Logic commercial release to gain widespread critical acclaim. Logic announced The Incredible World Tour, taking place in spring 2016. After the conclusion of The Incredible World Tour, it was revealed that Logic and rapper G-Eazy would be co-headlining The Endless Summer Tour, a nationwide tour, together in summer 2016. Rappers YG and Yo Gotti would be the supporting acts. Two weeks ahead of the start of the tour, Logic released the song, "Flexicution" on June 14, 2016, a song that he teased on social media for months which featured Jessica Andrea on the latter end of the song, where she provides backing vocals. The song peaked at number 100 on the Billboard Hot 100 chart, becoming his first song to chart on the Hot 100. He was later featured on the song, "Sucker for Pain" with Lil Wayne, Wiz Khalifa, Imagine Dragons, Ty Dolla Sign and X Ambassadors on June 24. The song was a part of the soundtrack for the 2016 movie, Suicide Squad, peaking at number 15 on the Billboard Hot 100 chart. "Wrist" was released on the same day and features vocals from Pusha T.

On July 1, 2016, Logic released a mixtape titled Bobby Tarantino. It was Logic's fifth mixtape, and his first since 2013 and was released unexpectedly via his Twitter account. The mixtape included the singles: "Flexicution" and "Wrist" and peaked at number 12 on the US Billboard 200 chart.

On October 3, 2016, Logic revealed the original title of his third studio album to be AfricAryaN, stating that "It's about me being black and white, and seeing life from two sides. [It's about] the cultural evolution and how you can go from the darkest of skin to the lightest of skin […] At the end of the day, we all have so many different ethnicities in our blood, no matter how pure we think we are".

=== 2017–2018: Everybody, Bobby Tarantino II and YSIV ===
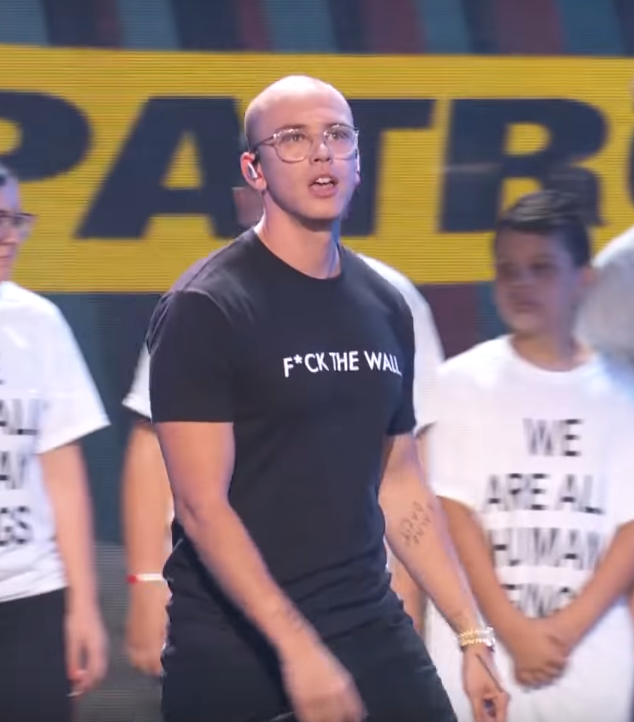
Logic performing at the 2018 VMAs

On March 29, 2017, Logic revealed the new title of his album titled, Everybody. The news of his third album was shared and revealed publicly on Logic's social media accounts in the form of videos revealing the official album cover designed and painted by Sam Spratt and directed by Andy Hines. The album was released on May 5, 2017, and included three singles: The title track, "Black Spiderman" featuring Damian Lemar Hudson, and "1-800-273-8255" featuring Alessia Cara and Khalid.

Everybody debuted at number one on the US Billboard 200 with 247,000 album-equivalent units, of which 196,000 were pure album sales. However, the album also set the record for largest second week drop of all time, as pure sales fell 96% to just 8,000 copies. The third single from the album, "1-800-273-8255", a song created in association with the National Suicide Prevention Lifeline was certified platinum 5× by the RIAA and peaked at number three on the Billboard Hot 100 chart and in the top 10 in various other countries. In August 2017, Logic guest starred in the animated comedy series Rick and Morty, voicing himself as the headliner of a festival. In November 2017, Logic released the song "Broken People" with Rag'n'Bone Man as part of the Bright soundtrack.

On February 23, 2018, Logic released a single titled "44 More". It was a sequel to "44 Bars", a song from Logic's 2016 mixtape Bobby Tarantino. The song peaked at number 22 on the US Billboard Hot 100 chart. The following single, "Overnight", was released four days later on February 27. Logic would eventually release another single titled "Everyday", with record producer Marshmello on March 2. Logic would later announce his sixth mixtape titled Bobby Tarantino II, with a promotional video featuring the characters of Rick and Morty, on March 7. Bobby Tarantino II was released on March 9, 2018, through Def Jam and Visionary Music Group and featured guest appearances from 2 Chainz, Big Sean, and Wiz Khalifa. It debuted at number one in the US, becoming his second consecutive number-one album in the US. On March 30, he was featured in the premiere episode of Netflix's original documentary series, Rapture.

On September 28, 2018, Logic released his fourth studio album titled, YSIV. Before releasing the project, Logic released three singles: "One Day" featuring Ryan Tedder, "The Return" and "Everybody Dies". The album features the song "Wu Tang Forever" which features all the surviving members of the Wu-Tang Clan. Logic later announced that he was writing a novel and said that he has written and plans to star in his own movie, which he's began to work on.

=== 2019–2021: Supermarket, Confessions of a Dangerous Mind, No Pressure, and retirement ===
On January 18, 2019, Logic released "Keanu Reeves", the lead single of his upcoming fifth studio album. He then released Supermarket, a novel written by himself with an accompanying soundtrack on March 26, 2019, expanding his musical abilities by featuring alternative rock. While he became the first rapper to have a New York Times No. 1 best-selling novel, the accompanying soundtrack received negative reviews from critics and peaked at No. 56 on the US Billboard 200. On March 19, Logic announced his fifth studio album Confessions of a Dangerous Mind and released its title track. The album's third single, "Homicide", was released on May 3 and featured a guest verse from Eminem. The song peaked at No. 5 on the Billboard Hot 100 chart and in the top 10 in various other countries. The album was released on May 10 and debuted at No. 1 on the US Billboard 200, making it his third album to reach the top of the chart.

Logic had a minor acting role when he provided the voice and motion capture for a villain in the final chapter of the video game The Last of Us Part II, which was released on June 19, 2020. On July 16, he announced that his sixth album, No Pressure, would be his last one as he wanted to retire and focus on being a father. The album was released on July 24 and was described as the sequel to his 2014 debut album, Under Pressure. On July 24, he started streaming full-time after signing an exclusive deal with Twitch. He uses his streams to produce beats in real-time, chat with fans, and play video games. He has played games with streamers such as Corpse Husband, Jacksepticeye, MrBeast, PewDiePie, Pokimane, Sykkuno, and Valkyrae. His first stream was the album listening party to No Pressure. He made his Grammy speech on the stream because he thought he would never get nominated, and thanked Drake, Kendrick Lamar, 6ix, A$AP Ferg (and A$AP Mob as a whole), J. Cole, and Toro y Moi. On September 11, Logic releases a TwitchTape, a beat tape that is downloadable for free.

=== 2021–2022: Return to music and Vinyl Days ===
On March 20, 2021, Logic announced preorders for his autobiographical memoir, This Bright Future. It was published later that year in September and debuted at number 4 in non-fiction on The New York Times Best Seller list. The book goes through the rapper's childhood filled with neglect and his success as a hip-hop artist. The memoir also goes through the hate he received after the release of his hit song "1-800-273-8255".

On April 23, Logic's YouTube channel BobbysWorld uploaded a song entitled "Mars Only Pt. 3", a collaboration between him and producer Madlib. Together, the duo is called Madgic, a portmanteau of the collaborators' names. The duo has released two more songs, "Raddest Dad" and "Mafia Music" in the same way.

On June 16, Logic announced a return to music, mimicking the statement issued by Michael Jordan upon his return to basketball. On June 18, he released the song "Intro", his first since returning to music, and over the following month he would release a series of singles presumed to be a part of an upcoming project. He released his seventh mixtape, Bobby Tarantino III, on July 30, 2021, which included 4 out of 5 of the singles released during the previous month ("Intro" was not included in the mixtape).

In August 2021, Logic made his onscreen debut in the Apple TV series Mr. Corman as Joseph Gordon-Levitt's biracial friend, Dax, in three episodes.

In January 2022, Logic announced his seventh studio album was in production, titled Vinyl Days. On April 18, he announced he was co-headlining the Vinyl Verse tour with fellow rapper Wiz Khalifa to promote the upcoming album set to release on June 17. The tour would begin on July 27 in Irvine, CA. On April 22, he released two singles, "Tetris" and "Decades", which would be featured on the album, and then released new singles every week preceding the release of the album.

On January 28, 2022, Logic was a guest star in two episodes from the animated series The Legend of Vox Machina.

On June 17, 2022, Logic released his seventh studio album, Vinyl Days to positive reviews. The album featured guest appearances from Action Bronson, Currensy, Russ, Wiz Khalifa, Royce da 5'9, RZA, AZ, DJ Premier, and The Game. A concert tour took place in July and August to promote the album. On numerous songs on the album, Logic would state his next album would be titled College Park, to be released soon.

On "Sayonara", the album's closing track, Logic reflected on his deal with Def Jam Recordings, claiming that his relationship with his label had its "ups and downs". In the song, Logic states "This what I'ma say about Def Jam, look, man... everybody, I fuck with y'all, I rock with y'all. Any other fuckboys behind the scenes, y'all could suck a dick, eat my whole fuckin' ballsack."

An accompanying documentary for the album was released on July 13, 2022.

=== 2022–present: Departure from Def Jam Recordings, College Park and Ultra 85 ===
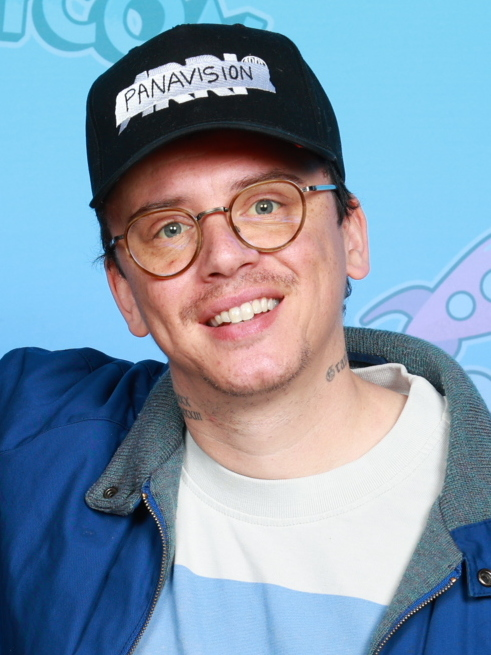
Logic at GalaxyCon Richmond in 2024

On July 4, Logic announced he had signed to BMG, transitioning the return of an independent music career. Speaking on signing with BMG, he stated "I'm just glad to move on to a place where I can be independent, and respected as an artist, and feel like I'm in control of my career."

Since 2022, Logic began releasing instrumental beat tape, starting with Peanuts on August 31. Various beat tapes including Loopin the 1st, Fantastic Beats and Where To Find Them, Picnic, Loopin the 2nd, Super Microphonus, Loopin the 3rd, and Gold Chain.

On February 24, 2023, Logic's eighth studio album, College Park, was released following his departure from his former label, Def Jam Recordings. It was supported by four singles prior to release, "Highlife", "Wake Up" (feat. Lucy Rose), a shortened single version of "Paradise II" (feat. Norah Jones), and "Lightsabers" (feat. C Dot Castro). It marks his first independent release since Young Sinatra: Welcome to Forever. In a video posted on Logic's YouTube channel, Logic told fans, "I love y'all and I'm making shit from the heart. I'm loving hip-hop. I was not really feeling it for a while. I don't really mean the music, I just mean the bullshit of the industry. But I realize now more than ever that none of that shit matters. I've missed you guys and I'm here and I just want to have fun and I'm so excited for College Park."

On July 5, 2023, Logic announced a partnership with Rubik's Cube. He also spoke of a possibility of an official cube under his name. During the summer of 2023, he released the four non-album singles, "Juice II", "Figure It Out", "Check Please", and "Noell". On September, Logic released Inglorious Basterd, his first independent mixtape in ten years. The album is only available on his Bandcamp and YouTube channel, due to the samples he used being unlicensed. The tracks from the mixtape range from 2011 to 2023, which is mainly focused on demo tapes and freestyles over pre-existent instrumentals of known rap songs including Lupe Fiasco's "Kick, Push".

On August 9, 2024, after long anticipation, Logic released his ninth studio album Ultra 85, which was initially announced through a hidden message from Everybody. The album received critical acclaim, with some critics claiming Ultra 85 as Logic's best work. Ultra 85 is intended to be released alongside Logic's science fiction novel of the same name, with the latter released on September 17, 2024. The following month, Logic announced on his YouTube channel that he is working on his tenth studio album Phonkedelic, showcasing Memphis rap, phonk, and rage influences. In April 2025, Logic made updates considering the Phonkedelic album, with the title having evolved into Sidequest. The debut single for the album, titled "It's a Fee", was released on April 28, 2025. It followed with the singles "Everyones Dead Already", "Sold Out", "Catch Me If You Can" (standalone single), and "Goround".

On May 1, 2025, Logic released the trailer to Paradise Records, a comedy-drama film about a record store. Logic directed, wrote, and produced the film. The movie premiered at the Tribeca Festival on June 6, 2025, afterward being released digitally on December 22, 2025.

== Personal life ==
In 2013, Logic stated that he smoked cannabis while growing up. He was also addicted to cigarettes, dedicating the song "Nikki" from Under Pressure to the subject. He speaks about smoking since the age of 13 and that, while he had attempted to give up marijuana and alcohol, he could not overcome the addiction until the age of 24. He pledged not to smoke another cigarette after the release of Under Pressure. He maintains a YouTube channel where he posts videos about his favorite video games, personal life, behind the scenes, and freestyle raps.

On October 22, 2015, Logic married singer Jessica Andrea. He announced that they had separated in March 2018, and filed for divorce the following month. They remained friends and did not cite anger as the reason for their split, stating that "it just didn't work out". Logic married Brittney Noell in September 2019, and they later had a son together named Bobby the following year in July. They also had a second child named Leo in July 2023.

== Artistry ==
Logic cites Frank Sinatra as his main inspiration. Sinatra's influence can be seen in several aspects of Logic's persona, with Logic's fans being called the "RattPack" (a play on Sinatra's "Rat Pack" and an acronym for "Real All the Time"). The group initially consisted of Logic's manager Christian Zarou, executive producer 6ix, and rappers C Dot Castro and Big Lenbo. He also describes his female fans as "BobbySoxers", as well as referring to himself as "Young Sinatra". As a child, his mother made him watch old black and white movies, which formed his love for the singer. Logic cites Sinatra as instrumental to him being able to carry and articulate himself the way he does, with Logic describing him as an individual who "showcased peace, love, grace, positivity, honor, and valor".

Logic has said that various forms of entertainment across many platforms have influenced him, including music by A Tribe Called Quest, Mos Def, Outkast, Red Hot Chili Peppers, Kendrick Lamar, J. Cole, Drake, Eminem, the Wu-Tang Clan, and films by Quentin Tarantino. In an interview with XXL, Logic stated, "I love all subgenres within hip-hop and all genres of music, and I think that's what allows me to make the music that I do, because of my appreciation for the music."

== Filmography ==
=== Film ===
Year	Film	Role	Notes	Ref.
2024	The 4:30 Movie	Astro Blaster	Cameo	
2025	Paradise Records	Cooper / Uncle Tony	Also Writer, Director and Producer	

=== Television ===
Year	Show	Role	Notes	Ref.
2017	Rick and Morty	Himself	Voice; Vindicators 3: The Return of Worldender	
2021	Mr. Corman	Dax	3 episodes	
2022	The Legend of Vox Machina	Palace Guard, Palace Guard 3	Voice; 2 episodes	

=== Video games ===
Year	Title	Role	Ref.
2020	The Last of Us Part II	Small Rattler	
2026	Mewgenics	Cats	

== Discography ==
Studio albums

- Under Pressure (2014)
- The Incredible True Story (2015)
- Everybody (2017)
- YSIV (2018)
- Confessions of a Dangerous Mind (2019)
- No Pressure (2020)
- Vinyl Days (2022)
- College Park (2023)
- Ultra 85 (2024)

Collaborative albums

- Live and in Color (with Juicy J) (2025)

== Tours ==
Headlining

- Welcome to Forever Tour (2013)
- While You Wait Tour (2014)
- Under Pressure Tour (2015)
- The Incredible World Tour (2016)
- Everybody's Tour (2017)
- Bobby Tarantino vs. Everybody Tour (2018)
- Confessions of a Dangerous Mind Tour (2019)
- The College Park Tour (2023)

Co-Headlining

- Visionary Music Group Tour (with Tayyib Ali) (2012)
- Endless Summer Tour (with G-Eazy) (2016)
- Vinyl Verse Summer Tour (with Wiz Khalifa) (2022)
- Endless Summer Tour Part II (with G-Eazy) (2026)

Supporting

- The Cud Life Tour (with Kid Cudi) (2013)

== Awards and nominations ==
Year	Association	Category	Nominated work	Result	Ref.
2017	MTV Video Music Awards	Best Fight Against the System	"Black SpiderMan"	Won‡	
2017	BMI R&B/Hip-Hop Awards	Most Performed R&B/Hip-Hop Songs	"Sucker for Pain"	Won	
2018	Grammy Awards	Song of the Year	"1-800-273-8255"	Nominated	
2018	Grammy Awards	Best Music Video	"1-800-273-8255"	Nominated	
2018	iHeartRadio Music Awards	Best New Pop Artist	Himself	Nominated	
2018	BMI Pop Awards	Award Winning Songs	"1-800-273-8255"	Won	

‡ Note: shared with other four nominees.
