= 6ix (music producer) =

American record producer from Maryland

- Born: Arjun Ivatury; February 17, 1991 (age 35); Bowie, Maryland, U.S.
- Genres: Hip hop
- Occupations: Record producer; songwriter
- Labels: Visionary; BMG; BobbyBoy

Arjun Ivatury (born February 17, 1991), known professionally as 6ix, is an American record producer best known for his work with Maryland-based rapper Logic, serving as his go-to producer since 2009. 6ix and Logic were both associated with independent record label Visionary Music Group, and the former has produced the near-entirety of Logic's early projects, namely Bobby Tarantino and Under Pressure.

== Early life and career ==
Ivatury is a native of Bowie, Maryland, being the son of Telugu Hindu immigrant parents originally from India. He comes from a white-collar Indian American background; his father and mother being a doctor and engineer respectively as well as his brother being an aerospace engineer at NASA. He Before he became a full-time producer, 6ix attended the University of Maryland, College Park, where he majored in neurology and physiology. In his senior year he dropped out of college in 2009 to move to Los Angeles with Bobby Hall, known professionally as Logic, to pursue a career in music production; he was 30 credits shy of his degree.

His father and uncle sparked his early love in music. He has said that he uses music to "relieve all pressure" by concentrating on the things he enjoyed as a kid. His production philosophy places a strong emphasis on simplicity since he feels that it lets the artist shine and helps listeners relate to the song. According to him, a track may simply need the most basic components, such a kick, snare, hi-hat, sample chop, piano or Rhodes section, and bassline.

6ix is best known for his work with Logic for whom he has produced over 53 songs since late 2009 to the present day, including eleven from Logic's 2018 album YSIV and ten from No Pressure (2020). The first song Logic and 6ix produced together was "Love Jones" from Logic's first mixtape. He was nominated for a Grammy Award for the first time for producing the song "1-800-273-8255" by Logic featuring Alessia Cara and Khalid.

On 15 February 2019, he also performed on stage alongside Logic and Eminem during his concert at Aloha Stadium, Hawaii.

=== Latest projects ===
6ix is also the executive producer of Logic's albums YSIV, released on September 28, 2018, Confessions of a Dangerous Mind released on May 10, 2019, and Vinyl Days, released on June 17, 2022. Confessions of a Dangerous Mind, although having mixed reception, has been widely praised by critics and fans alike for its production, mixing and sound engineering.

6ix also was on the production of ten of fifteen tracks on Logic's 6th album No Pressure, which was released on July 24, 2020.

=== 2025 - Present ===
On 7 March 2025, 6ix released his debut studio album, Homebody. The album features vocals from Juicy J, DRAM, Guapdad4000, Logic, Tobi, Jazz Cartier, Cousin Stizz, Chlothegod, Joey Valence & Brae, Buddy, Blu, Kyle, and Skizzy Mars, among others.
