= Visionary Music Group =

American independent record label and management company

Visionary Records
- Founded: 2011
- Founder: Chris Zarou
- Genre: Hip-hop; pop
- Official website: teamvisionary.com

Visionary Music Group (formerly known as Visionary Records) is an American independent record label and management company, founded in 2011 by Chris Zarou. The label is best known for having signed rapper Logic prior to his mainstream breakthrough; other notable signees include Jon Bellion, Quinn XCII, Chelsea Cutler, Jeremy Zucker, Ayokay, Tayyib Ali (their very first signee), and record producer 6ix.

== History ==
The first signee to Visionary Music Group was Tayyib Ali.

After frequent Facebook messages and visits to Logic's home in Maryland, Chris Zarou convinced the rapper to sign to Visionary Music Group.

Shortly after, Zarou was contacted by singer Jon Bellion who was in need of management. At first, Zarou declined to work with Bellion due to his increasing schedule with Logic. However, Bellion was determined to have the young executive guide his career rather than the industry veterans who had been trying to recruit him. Zarou eventually agreed to take the vocalist on as a client.

In 2018, Visionary Music Group partnered with management company Mutual Friends which resulted in Quinn XCII, Chelsea Cutler, Jeremy Zucker, Ayokay, and 6ix being added to its roster.
