= Pressure (disambiguation) =

Pressure is an effect which occurs when a force is applied on a surface.

Pressure may also refer to:

== People ==
- Pressure (reggae musician) (born 1981), US Virgin Islands reggae artist
- MC Pressure, MC with the Hilltop Hoods

== Arts, entertainment, and media ==
=== Films ===
- Pressure (1976 film), a Black-British film
- Pressure (2002 film), a thriller
- Pressure (2015 film), an action film
- Pressure (2026 film), a British war thriller

=== Music ===
==== Albums ====
- Pressure (Jeezy album), 2017
- Pressure (Maiko Zulu album), 2003
- Pressure (Open Space album), 2012
- Pressure (EP), by the Score, 2019
- Pressure (Tyler Bryant & the Shakedown album), 2020
- Pressure (Wage War album), 2019

==== Songs ====
- "Pressure" (Ari Lennox song), 2021
- "Pressure" (Belly song), 2007
- "Pressure" (Billy Joel song), 1982
- "Pressure" (The Kinks song), 1979
- "Pressure" (Muse song), 2018
- "Pressure" (Nadia Ali song), 2011
- "Pressure" (Paramore song), 2005
- "Pressure" (Skindred song), 2006
- "Pressure" (Sunscreem song), 1991
- "Pressure" (Youngblood Hawke song), 2014
- "Pressure" (Yungster Jack and David Shawty song), 2020
- "The Pressure" (song), by Jhene Aiko, 2014
- "The Pressure Part 1", by Sounds of Blackness, 1991
- "Pressure", by the 1975 from The 1975, 2013
- "Pressure", by Kai from Wait on Me, 2025
- "Pressure", by Staind from Break the Cycle, 2001
- "Pressures", by Parkway Drive from Deep Blue, 2010
- "Presha", by 2 Chainz and Lil Wayne (2023)
- "Can U Be", by ¥$ also referred to as "Pressure"

==== Performers ====
- The Pressure (band), an American band

=== Other uses in arts, entertainment, and media ===
- Pressure (play), 2014, by David Haig
- "Pressure", a SpongeBob SquarePants season 2 episode
- "The Pressure", a The Amazing World of Gumball season 1 episode
- "Pressure", a Roblox horror game

== Science and technology ==
- Peer pressure, a psychological influence exerted by a peer group
- Pressure measurement, techniques that have been developed for the measurement of pressure and vacuum
  - Atmospheric pressure
  - Blood pressure
  - Sound pressure
  - Static pressure
- Pressure vessel, a container designed to hold gases or liquids at a pressure substantially different from the ambient pressure
  - Pressure cooker

== Other uses ==
- Pass pressure, defensive strategy in American football

== See also ==
- Press (disambiguation)
- Under Pressure (disambiguation)
