= Dria =

American singer-songwriter

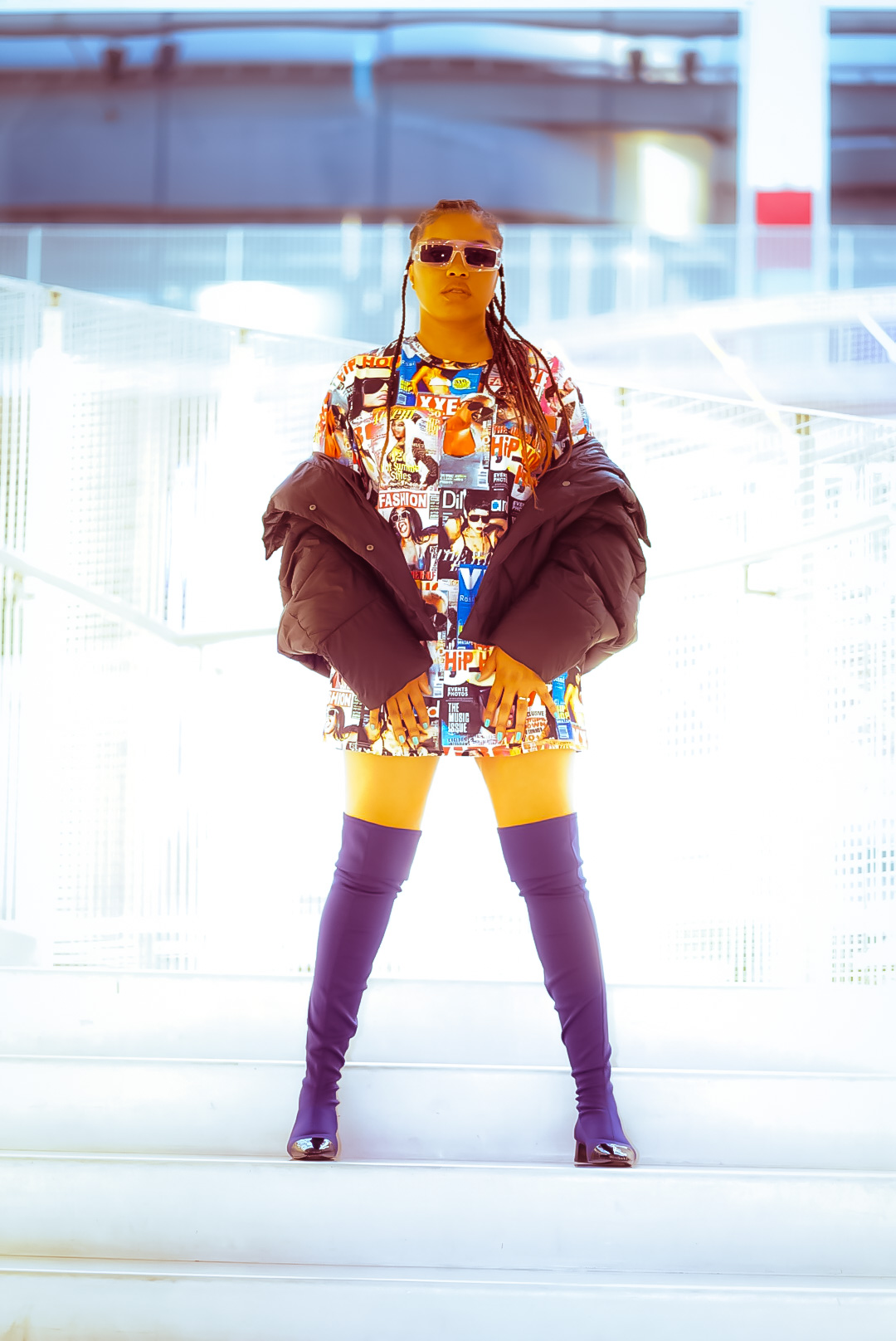
- DRIA 2022

Background information
- Also known as: Dria, Dria Thornton
- Born: Diondria Thomas; Houston, Texas, U.S.
- Genres: R&B; hip hop; pop
- Occupations: Singer, songwriter, record producer
- Years active: 2013 - present
- Label: INDEPENDENT

Diondria Elaine Thornton (née Thomas) (born October 7, 1981) is an American singer-songwriter born in Houston, Texas.

== Early life ==
Thomas was born in Houston, Texas, United States, and raised in Fullerton, California. Her father was a public transit driver for OCTA (Orange County Transit Authority) and her mother worked for the Human Services dept. She has a younger sister named Brittany Thomas.

She began her artistic endeavours at Huntington Beach Academy for The Performing Arts (APA) in Huntington Beach, California. At APA, she studied Musical Theatre, Chamber Choir, Chamber Orchestra (as a violinist), Show Choir, Actors Repertoire and Improvisational Acting. After graduating High School she attended University of Houston with a major in Psychology and joined a local Houston girls group.

After moving back to California in 2002, she pursued her solo career writing and producing her own songs. She began performing live and singing national anthems for USTA/UWTA tennis matches and NFL football games.

== Career ==
=== Early career: The Frontrunnaz ===
In 2008, alongside her then-partner Christopher Thornton, Dria founded the songwriting and production team The Frontrunnaz, which has since collaborated in several pieces for successful hip-hop artists such as Logic, Ray J and Young Thug. As an AFTRA vocalist, Dria's vocals have also been featured on Rick Ross "Money Dance" and "Lamborghini Doors", Meek Mill's "Shine" and Young Thug's "Wyclef Jean".

As co-founder of the Frontrunnaz, Dria has co-written records such as Seamus Haji's Remix of "After Midnight" and Logic's "Stainless" and "Till the End".

=== Solo career: The beginning (2013–2014) ===
As a solo singer, she has either been featured or provided additional vocals for artists like Rick Ross, Logic, Mobb Deep, Young Thug, Meek Mill, Lecrae, and others.

Dria started her solo career when she was featured in Ray J's single "ATM". The single featured her for the first time under the artistic name of "Dria", and was later used for licensing for the show "Love and Hip Hop Hollywood". It was initially written by The Frontrunnaz team as a song for Miley Cyrus or Rihanna. Ray j's management team heard Dria's vocal on the song and decided to keep her on the song as a feature. Dria's voice is featured on the Pre-Chorus and the Chorus of the song. ATM received generally positive reviews with ThisisRnB describing it as a "bouncy single for his unreleased album" and Sue Robinson (from AXS) commenting on how "the trio [Ray J, Dria and Migos] creates just the right blend to this energized rhythm which contains a multitude of sexual innuendos – possibly a hint to fans on what can be expected in the upcoming studio album"

=== 2015–2016: Logic, Lecrae and Dove nomination ===
In 2015, Dria's solo career took off. She was a featured artist on the mixtape release: "Frontrunnaz presents Ready, Set, Go ft. Dria, Keme Davis and Dutchess" produced by The Frontrunnaz. That year she also collaborated with Drake in the production of the soundtrack for Serena Williams’ Signature Statement Fall Collection for the HSN with KIA STYLE360.

While working with her writing partner, Chris Thornton in Los Angeles, they were invited to an impromptu recording session with rapper Logic. After being asked to stay another day for more vocals, she would go on to co-write "Till the end" and sing background vocals on 4 songs on his debut album Under Pressure. As the relationship and success with Logic progressed, Dria was hired to compose and sing on Logic's 2nd and 3rd albums. She and Chris were invited to Hawaii to provide vocals on 8 songs on the Under Pressure album including one co-write and a featured artist spot on "Stainless".

Logic's successful hip-hop album The Incredible True Story (2015) debuted at number 3 on the Billboard 200 in the US and sold 135,000 album-equivalent units and 118,000 copies in its first week. The album debuted at number 1 on Top R&B/Hip-Hop Albums chart, surpassing Under Pressure, which opened at number 2.

Dria was featured on Lecrae's "Illuminate" released in February 2016, where she performed the chorus and background vocals. "Illuminate" was released as an exclusive pre-download for the people that preordered Lecrae's new book, Unashamed, that was released on May of the same year.

In August 2016 she was featured in Young Thug's new album No, my name is Jeffery with additional vocals as well as in Monn's "Not Missin U", on which the Crssbeat critics stated "The sweet vocals of Dria are one of the key elements which flow through the track alongside the melodies which have been made." In September 2016, Dria teased in her Twitter account about a new project to come that was "completely God driven" and she was very excited about.

=== 2017– present: Logic, Meek Mill and solo career ===
In 2017, Dria worked with Logic on his third album Everybody and contributed background and lead vocals to 5 records including the 7× platinum, Grammy nominated, "1-800-273-8255" by Logic ft. Alessia Cara and Khalid. The album has been certified RIAA Platinum. While doing vocal work for Lil Wayne's producer Streetrunner, Dria's background vocals were featured on "Shine" by Meek Mill and "Lamborghini Doors" by Rick Ross.

Using vocals created by The Frontrunnaz from a vocal kit with S1 called "Voices" ft. The Frontrunnaz; Producer Jake One embedded Dria's vocals in the track to create "Money Dance" ft. The Dream. Using the same vocal kit, producer Supah Mario created "Wyclef Jean" for Young Thug. As of 2018, Dria is currently working on her own music. She released her first single independently, called "Brand New" on December 28, 2017. Dria was featured as a co-writer on a song called "Ladida" by Japanese Artist Kumi Koda, scheduled to be released in February 2018.

== Personal life ==
Dria is a childhood friend of tennis player Serena Williams. She is married to Christopher Thornton, who is also her business partner in The Frontrunnaz production team.

In late 2017, Dria was bridesmaid at Serena's wedding, along with Venus Williams.

== Discography ==
- The Frontrunnaz presents Ready, Set, Go ft. Dria, Keme Davis and Dutchess
- Symbolyc One (S1) Kits: Voices Vocal Collection ft. The Frontrunnaz
- When I Grow Up" -2022 Dria Thornton

=== Singles ===
- "Baby I Got You (2017)
- "Brand New" (2018)
- "Mama"(2021)
- "Imperfect Behavior" (2021)
- "I Can Do It" (2022)

== Collaborations ==
=== Featured artist ===
- "Not Missin U" by Monn ft. Dria (2016)
- "Illuminate" by Lecrae ft. Dria (2016) Vocals
- "Stainless" by Logic ft. Dria (2015)
- "ATM" by Ray J ft. The Migos ft. Dria (2014) Vocals

=== Lead and background vocals ===
- "Lamborghini Doors" by Rick Ross in Rather You Than Me (2017) Lead Vocals
- "Black Spiderman" by Logic in Everybody (2017) Lead Vocals *RIAA certified: Gold
- "Confess" by Logic in Everybody (2017) Lead Vocals
- "Everybody" by Logic in Everybody (2017) Background Vocals *RIAA certified: 2× Gold
- "Anziety" by Logic in Everybody (2017) Background Vocals
- "1–800" by Logic in Everybody (2017) Background Vocals *RIAA certified: 3x times platinum
- "Illuminate" by Lecrae ft. Dria (2016) Lead Vocals
- "Not Missin U" by Monn (2016) Vocals
- "Wyclef Jean" by Young Thug (2016) Lead Vocals
- "Shine" by Meek Mill in DC4 (2016) Lead & Background Vocals
- "Blessed Up" by Meek Mill in DC4 (2016) Background Vocals
- "Money Dance" by Rick Ross (2015) Lead & Additional Vocals
- "Till The End" by Logic in Under Pressure (2014): Lead & Additional Vocals
- "Stainless" by Logic ft. Dria (2015) Vocals
- "Like Whoa" by Logic in The Incredible True Story (2015) Lead & background Vocals
- "Contact" by Logic in The Incredible True Story (2015) Lead & background Vocals
- "Never Been" by Logic in The Incredible True Story (2015) Lead & background Vocals

=== Songwriting ===
- "After Midnight" by Seamus Haji (2013) Co-Written
- "Till the End" by Logic (2014): Co-Written
- "Stainless" by Logic (2015) Co-written
- "Like Whoa" by Logic (2015) Co-written
- "Never Been" by Logic (2015) Co-written
- "Money Dance" by Rick Ross (2015)
- "Not Missin U" by Monn Ft Dria (2016) Co-Written
- "Can't Do You" by Lecrae ft E-40 (2016) Co-Written
- "Shine" by Meek Mill in DC4 (2016) Co-Written
- "Blessed Up" by Meek Mill in DC4 (2016) Co-Written
- "Anywhere" by Tech N9ne in After The Storm (2016) Co-Written
- "Wyclef Jean" by Young Thug (2016)
- "Confess" by Logic in Everybody (2017) Co-Written
- "Lamborghini Doors" by Rick Ross in Rather You Than Me (2017) Co-Written

== Award nominations ==
- GMA Dove Awards 2016: Nominated with Lecrae's "Can't Do you" as Rap/ Hip Hop Recorded Song of the Year.
