= Deathday Party =

American band

Deathday

Background information
- Origin: Los Angeles, California, United States
- Genres: Post-punk; Noise rock Dark Wave; Experimental
- Years active: 2002-present
- Label: Sweating Tapes Desire Mannequin
- Members: Alex Guillén; Giovanni Guillén; Jeramy Graham
- Website: Official Facebook Page

Deathday (formerly Deathday Party) is a Los Angeles–based experimental post-punk band, formed in Santa Ana, California, in 2008 by brothers Alex Guillén and Giovanni Guillén. Previous incarnations of the group can be traced back to Santa Ana's Koo's scene of the late 1990s.

== History ==
Deathday made their live debut with a performance at Los Angeles venue, The Smell, in September 2008 and began performing around Los Angeles as a duo accompanied by vintage drum machine. As their sound progressed and became more focused, Joevanie Lopez was recruited to add drums and expand the outfit's execution.

In 2009, the trio began to work on what would become their debut album amidst the summer heat, immersing themselves in isolation, dark iconography, occultism, and American violence. To capture the aesthetics of the subject matter musically, the band exercised heavy use of tape saturation and manipulation, recording on everything from reel-to-reels to boomboxes. Cascading through a plethora of tape mediums and analog devices intentionally gave the recordings a sense of urgency and decay. In October 2010, these recordings emerged in the form of Ghost Pains, a self-released EP.

Upon its release, Ghost Pains captured the attention of French label, Desire, at which point, label head Jérôme Mestre requested the band expand the EP to a full-length. The band added one more song to the now self-titled album: “Charles Joseph Whitman,” a song recounting the 1966 shooting rampage of the Austin tower sniper, and the last song written for the album. Incidentally, the band entered the studio for that final day of recording on January 8, 2011, the same day as the 2011 Tucson shooting of Senator Gabrielle Giffords. The dread of these events lies like a fog over the album.

Deathday was released on March 6, 2012.

== Discography ==
- So Click Heels – Various (Track – "Dropped into Obscurity") (LP/CD) – Downwards Records (2012)
- Deathday – Deathday (LP/CS) – Sweating Tapes / Desire(2012)
- Split Release – Deathday/Bestial Mouths (EP) – Sweating Tapes / Desire(2013)
- The end of civilization - Various (Track – "After Dark") (LP) – Mannequin(2013)
- _ever Alive – a tribute to Snowy Red – Various (Track – "So Low") (LP) – Weyrdson (2013)
- No Future – Deathday (EP) – Mannequin(2013)

== Members ==
- Giovanni Guillén – Vocals/Guitar/Synthesizers
- Alex Guillén – Synthesizers/Drum Machines
- Jeramy Graham – Bass/Synthesizers

== Former members ==
- Patrick Covert –
- Chad Valasek – Percussion
- Q. Gauti Andrisson – Bass
- Jovannie Lopez – Drums
