= Gang Related (disambiguation) =

Gang Related is a 1997 film.

Gang Related may also refer to:

- Gang Related (soundtrack), the soundtrack album for the film
- Gang Related (TV series), a 2014 Fox television series
- "Gang Related" (song), 2014 song by Logic
- Gang Related (Anybody Killa song), 2003
