= Everybody (Logic song) =

Single by Logic

from the album Everybody
- Released: March 31, 2017
- Recorded: 2015
- Genre: Hip-hop
- Length: 2:42
- Label: Visionary; Def Jam
- Songwriters: Bobby Hall II; Arjun Ivatury
- Producers: Logic; 6ix; PSTMN

Logic singles chronology
"Sriracha" (2016)	"Everybody" (2017)	"Black Spiderman" (2017)

Audio sample
- file; help

"Everybody" is a song by the American rapper Logic. It is the lead single from his third studio album, Everybody, and was released by Visionary Music Group and Def Jam Recordings on March 31, 2017. The song was produced by Logic, 6ix and PSTMN. On October 12, 2018, the soundtrack for the film The Hate U Give used the song.

== Background ==
Logic teased the song on January 1, 2016, on Snapchat. In an interview with Genius, Logic spoke on the creation process behind the song, saying, "This was the first song that I wrote for the album, this was like two years ago, which is crazy to say that. I just knew it was something that I wanted to say. I just felt compelled, and I didn’t even really still know about the whole concept of the album yet, like I had this idea in my mind, but this is just something I really needed to say."

On August 25, 2018, EA Sports announced that "Everybody" would be used in Madden NFL 18.

== Chart performance ==
"Everybody" debuted at number 59 on the Billboard Hot 100 and the Canadian Hot 100 for the chart dated April 22, 2017. "Everybody" is Logic's third appearance on the Hot 100 following "Sucker for Pain" and "Flexicution". On March 15, 2018, the single was certified platinum by the Recording Industry Association of America (RIAA) for combined sales and streaming-equivalent units of over a million units in the United States.

== Charts ==
Chart (2017)	Peak position
Australia Hitseekers (ARIA)	7
Canada Hot 100 (Billboard)	59
New Zealand Heatseekers (RMNZ)	4
US Billboard Hot 100	59
US Hot R&B/Hip-Hop Songs (Billboard)	27

== Certifications ==
Region	Certification	Certified units/sales
New Zealand (RMNZ)	Gold	15,000^{‡}
United States (RIAA)	Platinum	1,000,000^{‡}
^{‡} Sales+streaming figures based on certification alone.
