= Under Pressure (disambiguation) =

"Under Pressure" is a 1981 song by Queen and David Bowie.

Under Pressure may also refer to:

== Books ==
- Under Pressure (cookbook), a 2008 cookbook by Thomas Keller
- Under Pressure, the serial title of The Dragon in the Sea, a 1956 novel by Frank Herbert

== Films ==
- Under Pressure (1935 film), a drama directed by Raoul Walsh
- Under Pressure (1997), an alternative title for Bad Day on the Block, a thriller starring Charlie Sheen
- Escape Under Pressure, or simply Under Pressure, a television film starring Rob Lowe

== Music ==
- Under Pressure (album), a 2014 album by Logic
  - "Under Pressure" (Logic song), its title track
- Under Pressure, a 1995 album by Such a Surge
- "Under Pressure (Ice Ice Baby)", a 2010 mashup by John & Edward featuring Vanilla Ice
- "Under Pressure", a 2019 song by Ashley Tisdale from Symptoms
- "Under Pressure", a 1997 song by Beres Hammond
- "Under Pressure", a 1990 song by Billy Connolly
- "Under Pressure", a 1980 song by DNA
- "Under Pressure", a 1989 song by Ras Kimono from the same titled album.
- "Under Pressure", a song by Stephanie Mills from her 1985 self-titled album
- "Under Pressure", a 1995 song by The Flaming Lips

== Television ==
- "Under Pressure" (D:TNG episode), an episode of Degrassi: The Next Generation
- "Under Pressure" (Modern Family), an episode of Modern Family
- "Under Pressure" (The Job Lot), a 2013 episode
- "Under Pressure", an episode of the TV series Digimon Adventure
- "Under Pressure", an episode of the TV series ER
- Sob Pressão (English: Under Pressure), a 2017 Brazilian medical drama TV series
- "Under Pressure: The U.S. Women's World Cup Team", a documentary series about the U.S. women's national soccer team

== See also ==
- "Got Me Under Pressure", a 1983 song by ZZ Top
- "Undie Pressure", a 2016 episode of The Loud House
- "Under the Pressure", a song by The War on Drugs from their 2014 album Lost in the Dream
