= City of Stars (disambiguation) =

"City of Stars" is a song performed by Ryan Gosling and Emma Stone in the 2016 film La La Land.

City of Stars may also refer to:

- City of Stars, a is the motto & nickname for the City of Kilgore
- City of Stars is a perfume collection by Louis Vuitton
- "City of Stars", a song by Logic from his 2015 album The Incredible True Story
- City of Stars, a nickname for Quezon City
- City of Stars, a colloquial term used to describe Brisbane, California
