= Alright (Logic song) =

2014 song by Logic featuring Big Sean

Promotional single by Logic featuring Big Sean

from the album Under Pressure
- Released: April 23, 2014
- Genre: Hip-hop
- Length: 3:38
- Label: Visionary; Def Jam
- Songwriters: Sir Robert Hall II; Donte Perkins; Sean Anderson; Antony Ryan; Robin Saville
- Producer: Tae Beast

"Alright" is a song by American rapper Logic, released on April 23, 2014 as the second promotional single from his debut studio album Under Pressure (2014), appearing on the deluxe edition. It features American rapper Big Sean and was produced by Tae Beast. The song contains samples of "Who U Wit?" by Lil Jon & the East Side Boyz and "Cathart" by Isan.

== Background ==
In an interview with HotNewHipHop in May 2014, Logic said "I've known Sean for like two years now. 'We both work with No I.D., so we're kind of in that circle. We both work out of the same studio. He's a good dude, I'm a good dude, and we just vibed out." With respect to their collaboration on "Alright", Logic stated "It's funny, because I wanted him to get on another song. He was in the studio doing some photoshoot, but he was on the other side of the wall, and he heard the beat and ran in, and was like 'What the fuck is this? I gotta get on this!'"

== Composition ==
The song uses synthesizers in the production, over which Logic performs in a rapid-fire flow. Logic and Big Sean both address having enemies that try to put an end to their success.

== Critical reception ==
The song received generally positive reviews. Josiah Hughes of Exclaim! wrote "Logic spits some quick-tongued verses, then Big Sean drops in and offers an excellent verse." Devin of Rap-Up commented that Sean "steals the show with his guest verse". XXL wrote that Big Sean "adds his stuntin' rhymes" to the song and "Logic lays down some strong rhymes that'll have you rewinding it back." Several music critics disapproved of the line from Big Sean's verse, "She doin' tricks with her pussy, I guess she's a vagician".

== Certifications ==
Region	Certification	Certified units/sales
United States (RIAA)	Platinum	1,000,000^{‡}
^{‡} Sales+streaming figures based on certification alone.
