= Everyday (Logic and Marshmello song) =

2018 single by Logic and Marshmello

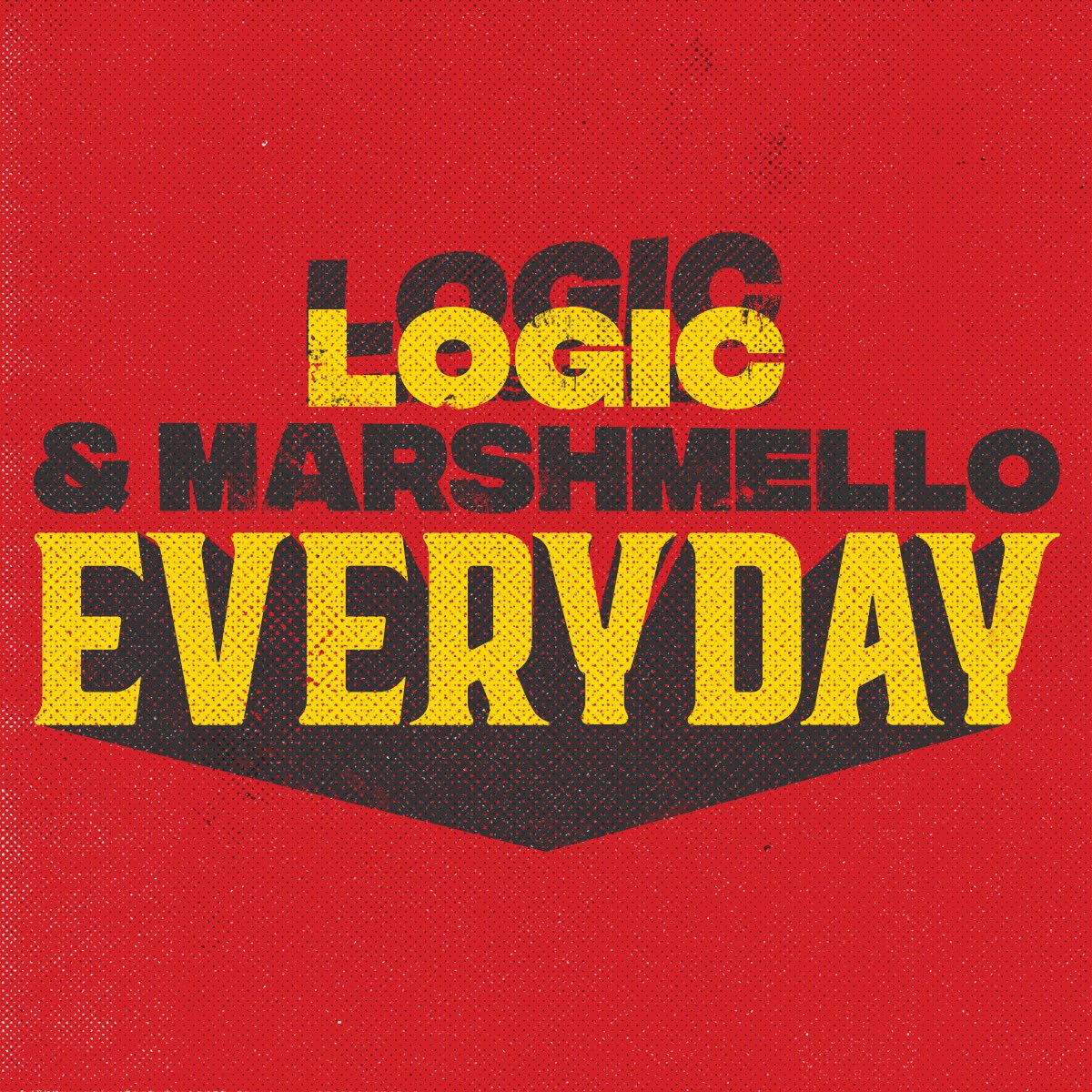

Single by Logic and Marshmello

from the album Bobby Tarantino II
- Released: March 2, 2018
- Length: 3:24
- Label: Visionary; Def Jam
- Songwriters: Sir Robert Bryson Hall II; Christopher Comstock
- Producers: Marshmello; 6ix (co.)

Logic singles chronology
"Overnight" (2018)	"Everyday" (2018)	"Pray" (2018)

Marshmello singles chronology
"Friends" (2018)	"Everyday" (2018)	"Fly" (2018)

Music video
- "Everyday" on YouTube

"Everyday" is a song written by American rapper Logic and American music producer Marshmello. Co-produced by 6ix, it was released on March 2, 2018 by Visionary Music Group and Def Jam Recordings, as the third single from Logic's from his sixth mixtape Bobby Tarantino II, following his 2018 singles "44 More" and "Overnight". Lyrically, Logic discusses his relentless work ethic and his motivators.

== Background ==
Marshmello first revealed the collaboration on August 11, 2017. "Been waiting to get in the studio with [Logic] for months now," he tweeted. "He's busy crushing the game." Logic officially announced the song on February 28, 2018. Both artists posted a behind-the-scenes video on social media prior to the song's release, which shows Marshmello in the studio dancing silently in front of the mic while Logic tells him to rap.

== Composition ==
The electronic-leaning track features "glitchy" hi-hats and synths. According to Rolling Stone's Ryan Reed, it finds Logic showcasing his wide range, and "alternating between brisk triplet rhymes and tender crooning."

== Critical reception ==
Aron A. of HotNewHipHop regarded the song as a "melody heavy single". He felt that it "veers into a different sound for both artists", with Marshmello "diving deeper into hip-hop with hints of EDM throughout" while Logic "flexes his melodic side a bit more". Kat Bein of Billboard regarded the song as "an ode to self-confidence from the emotionally-conscious MC currently batting a thousand" on which Marshmello "brings his trap drums to the forefront". Describing it as "bouncy, boastful and instantly enjoyable", he felt that it is "damn-near destined for radio play". Nicole Mastrogiannis of iHeartRadio wrote that Marshmello "shows fans the versatility of his skills as a producer with its hip hop beat".

== Music video ==
Directed by Alan Ferguson, the music video was released on April 17, 2018. The video is ten minutes long, and depicts Logic as a white-collar worker. Marco Margaritoff of Complex describes it as a "clear tribute to films like Fight Club and Office Space which explored the mundanity of a 9-to-5, with the latter receiving the most direct homage halfway in."

=== Synopsis ===
The video starts with Logic, who was "up all night preparing a presentation", asleep and being woke by his two bosses. Then, when the song begins, the video shifts scenes between Logic driving to and from work, and his time in the workplace. He is seen getting along with his fellow workmates, but is always being pushed around and treated unfairly by the two harsh bosses, who force him to fulfill coffee runs, data work, and loads of work. Nevertheless, he is still the most diligent worker in the office, even staying overnight to work at one point and set up the meeting space, and falls asleep again. The bosses keep assigning him loads of work to do, even when the other workers are free to not do so. As the song is at the middle of the second verse, Logic is at the office printer when a nearby clock is running faster and faster.

The music stops, and in the next scene Logic is still at the printer, but suddenly realizes that he has grown old, having spent his whole life in the workspace. The male boss approaches him with orders to make copies and wash his car. Logic refuses, and then decides to quit his job, asking everyone if anyone would like to come with him. Marshmello, who is in the back of the room, comes to join him. The song's co-producer 6ix and another fellow worker come with him as well after Logic grabs the printer. They are about to leave the office when the boss orders two security officers to "kill these fuckers" and "kick their nuts in". Logic, Marshmello, and their two workmates run with the security officers chasing them, until they realize that they outnumber the guards, and then defeat them in a fight. As the four exit the building with the printer, Logic's song "Warm It Up" plays. The four destroy the printer by stomping it and hitting it with baseball bats. After that, Logic and Marshmello get in their car and drive off. They go playing basketball and skateboard with their friends. "Everyday" then plays again where it left off. The duo continues to enjoy themselves, including doing yoga, partying and mountain climbing. By the time the song is ending, Logic and Marshmello go skydiving, where the former exclaims, "Marshmello! We're living our dreams, man! Wooo! This is insane! Wooo!"

The scene then shifts back to Logic as a young man at the printer. He is caught daydreaming, and walks away from the angry bosses, who reprimand him, until Logic interrupts. He indignantly complains that all they "constantly do is berate" him, and have forced him to work on Christmas and his birthday, even though he is the hardest worker at the office. He goes on to protest that they would not even let him visit his aunt Keesha when she got her leg amputated. He then screams, "Fuck you!" and storms off, while gasping, laughing and clapping is heard from the office workers. The male boss yells back, "Fuck your aunt!" As Logic gets to the parking lot, the two bosses and the rest of the workers walk to the window and watch him. Logic puts his suitcase in his car, and breaks into his bosses car next to his. He goes to a sign that says "RESERVED FOR DIVISION HEAD" with a sharpie, scribbling out the "DIVISION" and writing the word "dick" above, in capital letters with the "I" drawn out like a penis. The workers watching him cheer and clap, as the chorus of "Everyday" plays one more time. Logic drives off, and the video ends with the party scene once again. Logic's song "44 More" plays while the credits are presented.

== Live performances ==
On March 3rd, 2018, Logic performed this song for the first time at the Botanica Music Festival, held at Six Flags Fiesta Texas, only one day after the song premiered.

On April 3, 2018, Logic performed the song live on The Ellen DeGeneres Show. Marshmello joined him on stage alongside DeGeneres as the performance conclude.

== Credits and personnel ==
Credits adapted from Tidal.

- Logic – composition
- Marshmello – composition, production
- 6ix – uncredited co-production
- Bobby Campbell – recording, mixing

== Charts ==
=== Weekly charts ===
Chart (2018–19)	Peak position
Australia (ARIA)	38
Austria (Ö3 Austria Top 40)	51
Belgium (Ultratip Bubbling Under Flanders)	13
Canada Hot 100 (Billboard)	15
Denmark (Tracklisten)	31
Germany (GfK)	48
Hungary (Stream Top 40)	19
Ireland (IRMA)	47
Netherlands (Single Top 100)	64
New Zealand (Recorded Music NZ)	36
Norway (VG-lista)	20
Portugal (AFP)	23
Sweden (Sverigetopplistan)	34
Switzerland (Schweizer Hitparade)	60
UK Singles (Official Charts)	46
US Billboard Hot 100	29
US Hot R&B/Hip-Hop Songs (Billboard)	16
US Pop Airplay (Billboard)	23
US Rhythmic Airplay (Billboard)	5

=== Year-end charts ===
Chart (2018)	Position
Portugal (AFP)	176
US Hot R&B/Hip-Hop Songs (Billboard)	76
US Rhythmic (Billboard)	35

== Certifications ==
Region	Certification	Certified units/sales
Brazil (Pro-Música Brasil)	2× Platinum	80,000^{‡}
Canada (Music Canada)	Platinum	80,000^{‡}
Denmark (IFPI Danmark)	Gold	45,000^{‡}
Germany (BVMI)	Gold	200,000^{‡}
New Zealand (RMNZ)	Platinum	30,000^{‡}
Poland (ZPAV)	Gold	25,000^{‡}
Portugal (AFP)	Platinum	10,000^{‡}
United Kingdom (BPI)	Silver	200,000^{‡}
United States (RIAA)	2× Platinum	2,000,000^{‡}
^{‡} Sales+streaming figures based on certification alone.

== Release history ==
Region	Date	Format	Label	Ref.
Various	March 2, 2018	Digital download	Def Jam	
Australia	March 2, 2018	Contemporary hit radio	Universal Music Australia	
United States	March 13, 2018	Rhythmic contemporary radio	Def Jam	
United States	April 3, 2018	Contemporary hit radio	Def Jam	
