= 44 More =

Single by Logic

from the album Bobby Tarantino II
- Released: February 23, 2018
- Genre: East Coast hip-hop; trap
- Length: 3:08
- Label: Visionary; Def Jam
- Songwriters: Sir Robert Bryson Hall II; Arjun Ivatury; Joshua Luellen; Eduardo Earle; Ramon Ibanga, Jr.
- Producers: 6ix; Illmind (co.)

Logic singles chronology
| "The Feeling" (2017) | "44 More" (2018) | "Overnight" (2018) |

"44 More" is a song recorded by American rapper Logic. It was released on February 23, 2018 by Visionary Music Group and Def Jam Recordings. It serves as Logic's first solo single since the release of his third album Everybody (2017). The song is a sequel to "44 Bars", a song from Logic's 2016 mixtape Bobby Tarantino. Lyrically, Logic discusses family issues and his thoughts on his current position in the rap industry, as well as addressing his detractors.

== Background and release ==
Logic recorded the song in summer 2017 while on tour. He announced the song a day before its release. In the accompanying snippet, Logic speaks to his hater, rapping: "Can't let fame go to your head/ F--- with me watch where you tread/ I'm finna kill it instead". The song features references to singers Katy Perry and Harry Styles. Logic's third studio album Everybody outsold Katy Perry's Witness and Harry Styles' self-titled solo debut album in its first week in the United States. "Sold more albums my first week than Harry Styles and Katy Perry/If that ain't a sign of the times then I don't know what is, man this sh*t is scary," he raps.

== Composition ==
"44 More" features exactly 44 bars as well as an 808 beat laced with "skittering" hi-hats and synths, according to Rolling Stone's Ryan Reed. The song samples "Zoom" by Future from the album Future (2017).

== Critical reception ==
Aron A. of HotNewHipHop praised the song, calling it a "proof of [Logic's] abilities as an emcee", writing: "The production bangs heavy throughout this track and Logic showcases his slick wordplay and versatile flows throughout." Bianca Gracie of Fuse felt the song "gives the mainstream side a different side of the rapper" and thinks that it "will earn respect from lovers of rap music". Tony Centeno of Vibe complimented Logic for "delivering a brand new extensive verse filled with nothing but rapid-fire wordplay".

== Credit and personnel ==
Credits adapted from Tidal.

- Logic – composition
- Future – composition
- 6ix – composition, production
- Illmind – composition, uncredited co-production
- Southside – composition
- Eduardo Earle – composition
- Bobby Campbell – mixing

== Charts ==
| Chart (2018) | Peak position |
|---|---|
| Australia (ARIA) | 85 |
| Canada Hot 100 (Billboard) | 33 |
| Ireland (IRMA) | 83 |
| New Zealand Heatseekers (RMNZ) | 2 |
| Portugal (AFP) | 70 |
| Sweden Heatseeker (Sverigetopplistan) | 1 |
| UK Singles (Official Charts) | 75 |
| US Billboard Hot 100 | 22 |
| US Hot R&B/Hip-Hop Songs (Billboard) | 13 |

== Certifications ==
| Region | Certification | Certified units/sales |
|---|---|---|
| Canada (Music Canada) | Gold | 40,000^{‡} |
| New Zealand (RMNZ) | Gold | 15,000^{‡} |
| United States (RIAA) | Platinum | 1,000,000^{‡} |
^{‡} Sales+streaming figures based on certification alone.
