= Bobby Tarantino II =

Mixtape by Logic
- Released: March 9, 2018
- Genres: Hip-hop; trap
- Length: 43:20
- Labels: Def Jam; Visionary
- Producers: 6ix (exec.); AG; BLWYRMND; DJ Khalil; Frank Dukes; Illmind; Kevin Randolph; Logic; Marshmello; Nico Chiara; OZ; Tariq Beats; Tee-WaTT; Vontae Thomas

Logic chronology
Everybody (2017)	Bobby Tarantino II (2018)	YSIV (2018)

Singles from Bobby Tarantino II
- 1. "44 More" Released: February 23, 2018; 2. "Overnight" Released: February 28, 2018; 3. "Everyday" Released: March 2, 2018

Bobby Tarantino II is the sixth mixtape by American rapper Logic. It was released on March 9, 2018, through Def Jam Recordings and Visionary Music Group. The mixtape features guest appearances from Logic's alter-ego, Young Sinatra, alongside 2 Chainz, Big Sean and Wiz Khalifa, with the production handled by Illmind, Marshmello and 6ix, among others. Bobby Tarantino II serves as a sequel to Logic's mixtape, Bobby Tarantino (2016).

Bobby Tarantino II was supported by three singles: "44 More", "Overnight" and "Everyday" with Marshmello.

== Promotion ==
The mixtape was announced on March 7, 2018 with a two-minute promotional video featuring the characters of the Adult Swim series Rick and Morty unveiling a March 9, 2018 release date. The mixtape cover was revealed the next day.

=== Singles ===
"44 More" was released as the lead single from the mixtape on February 23, 2018. The track was produced by 6ix along with Illmind. The song peaked at number 22 on the Billboard Hot 100 chart.

"Overnight" was released as the mixtape's second single on February 28, 2018. A music video was released a day prior before the official release. The song was produced by 6ix.

"Everyday" with record producer Marshmello was released as the mixtape's third single on March 2, 2018. The song was produced by Marshmello.

== Commercial performance ==
Bobby Tarantino II debuted at number one on the US Billboard 200 with 119,000 album-equivalent units, of which 32,000 were pure album sales in its first week. It is Logic's second number-one album after Everybody (2017). In its second week, the album dropped to number four on the chart, earning 47,000 units. In its third week, the album dropped to number six on the chart, earning 33,000 units. In its fourth week, the album dropped to number ten on the chart, earning 27,000 units. On September 11, 2018, the mixtape was certified gold by the Recording Industry Association of America (RIAA) for combined sales and album-equivalent units of over 500,000 units in the United States.

== Track listing ==
Credits adapted from Tidal and BMI.

No.	Title	Writer(s)	Producer(s)	Length
1.	"Grandpa's Space Ship"		Logic	2:02
2.	"Overnight"	Sir Robert Hall II; Arjun Ivatury	6ix	3:38
3.	"Contra"	Hall II; Ozan Yildirim; Nico Chiara; Simon Schranz	OZ; Chiara^{[a]}; BLWYRMND^{[c]}	3:37
4.	"BoomTrap Protocol"	Hall II; Ivatury; James Dondelinger	6ix	3:41
5.	"Yuck"	Hall II; Ivatury; Aaron Gomez	6ix; AG	2:53
6.	"Indica Badu" (featuring Wiz Khalifa)	Hall II; Ivatury; Khalil Abdul-Rahman; Kevin Randolph; Cameron Thomaz	6ix; DJ Khalil^{[b]}; Randolph^{[b]}	4:20
7.	"Midnight"	Hall II; Ivatury; Adam Feeney	6ix; Frank Dukes	4:01
8.	"Warm It Up" (featuring Young Sinatra)	Nasir Jones; Hall II; Ivatury; Terry Watson; Anthony Cruz; Oliver Scott; Ronnie Wilson	6ix; Tee-WaTT^{[b]}	4:00
9.	"Wizard of Oz"	Hall II; Ivatury; Yildirim	6ix; OZ^{[c]}	2:24
10.	"State of Emergency" (featuring 2 Chainz)	Hall II; Ivatury; Altariq Crapps; Darrel Alston; Abdul-Rahman; Tauheed Epps	Tariq Beats; Vontae Thomas; DJ Khalil	2:34
11.	"Wassup" (featuring Big Sean)	Hall II; Ivatury; Sean Anderson; Winston Riley; Reggie Williams	6ix	3:39
12.	"Everyday" (with Marshmello)	Hall II; Christopher Comstock	Marshmello	3:24
13.	"44 More"	Hall II; Ivatury; Joshua Luellen; Nayvadius Wilburn; Eduardo Earle; Ramon Ibanga Jr.	6ix; Illmind^{[c]}	3:08
Total length:				43:20

Notes

- ^{^[a]} signifies a co-producer
- ^{^[b]} signifies an additional producer
- ^{^[c]} signifies an uncredited co-producer
- "Grandpa's Space Ship" features additional vocals from Justin Roiland, voicing both Rick and Morty
- "Yuck" features additional vocals from Paul Rothenberg and Elton John
- "Warm It Up" credits Logic as featured artist "Young Sinatra"

Sample credits

- "Contra" contains a sample of "Buried Alive" written by Sir Robert Hall II and David Cunningham, and performed by Logic.
- "BoomTrap Protocol" contains a sample from "Space Traveller", written and performed by Katsutoshi Morizono; a sample from "Like Woah", written by Sir Robert Hall II, Arjun Ivatury, John Cameron, and performed by Logic; and a sample from "Ink Blot", written by Sir Robert Hall II, Arjun Ivatury, Dominik Patrzek, Shuntaro Tanikawa, Michi Tanaka, and Jordan Houston, and performed by Logic.
- "Indica Badu" contains a sample from "Didn't Cha Know?" written by Erica Wright, James Yancey, and Philip Clendeninn, and performed by Erykah Badu.
- "Midnight" contains a sample from "Who U Wit?", written by Jonathan Smith, Sammie Norris, and Wendell Neal, and performed by The East Side Boyz; a sample from "925", written by Sir Robert Hall II, Lawrence Parker, Curtis Mayfield, Kendrick Lamar, Chauncey Hollis, and performed by Logic; and a sample from "Knots 85", written and performed by Frank Dukes.
- "Warm It Up" contains a sample from "Live on the Air", written by Sir Robert Hall II, and performed by Logic; a sample from "Life's a Bitch", written by Nasir Jones, Anthony Cruz, Olu Dara, Ronnie Wilson, and Oliver Scott, and performed by Nas; and a sample from "Ain't No Sunshine", written by Willis Jackson and Bill Withers, and performed by Willis Jackson.
- "State of Emergency" contains a sample from "Never Enough", written by Sir Robert Hall II, Minta Notini, Lindsey Lohan, Rob Kinelski, Adam Gusterson, Robert Mellin, Guy Wood, George Clinton, William Collins, Lorenzo Patterson, Abrim Tilmon, Bernard Worrell, Eric Wright, Andre Young, Steve Wyreman, Claire Courchene, and Kevin Randolph, and performed by Logic.
- "Wassup" contains a sample from "Cuh Oonuh", written and performed by Reggie Stepper, and a sample from "Mercy", written by Kanye West, Stephan Taft, Sean Anderson, Terrence Thornton, Tauheed Epps, Michael Williams II, Ross Birchard, Michael Dean, James Thomas, Denzie Beagle, Winston Riley, and Reggie Williams, and performed by West, Big Sean, Pusha T, and 2 Chainz.
- "44 More" contains a sample from "Zoom", written by Nayvadius Wilburn, Joshua Luellen, Eduardo Earle Jr., and Ramon Ibanga Jr., and performed by Future, and a sample from "Waves", written by Kanye West, Christopher M. Brown, Scott Mescudi, Cydel Young, Tony Williams, Elon Rutberg, Ross Birchard, Derek Watkins, Michael Dean, Chancellor Bennett, Leland Wayne, Ernest Brown, Fred Brathwaithe, Robin Diggs, Kevin Ferguson, Theodore Livingston, Darryl Mason, and James Whipper, and performed by West.

== Personnel ==
Credits adapted from Tidal.

Performance

- Logic - main artist
- Wiz Khalifa - featured artist (track 6)
- 2 Chainz - featured artist (track 10)
- Big Sean - featured artist (track 11)
- Marshmello - featured artist (track 12)
- Justin Roiland - vocals (track 1)
- Paul Rothenberg - vocals (track 5)
- Elton John - vocals (track 5)

Production

- 6ix - executive production, production (tracks 2, 4, 6–9, 11, and 13)
- Logic - executive production, production (tracks 1)
- BLWYRMND - uncredited production (track 3)
- OZ - production (tracks 3 and 9)
- AG - production (track 5)
- Frank Dukes - production (track 7)
- Tariq Beats - production (track 10)
- Vontae Thomas - production (track 10)
- DJ Khalil - production (track 10), additional production (track 6)
- Marshmello - production (track 12)
- Kevin Randolph - additional production (track 6)
- Tee-Watt - additional production (track 8)

Technical

- Justin Roiland - recording (track 1)
- Bobby Campbell - mixing (track 2), recording (track 2)
- Robert Campbell - mixing (tracks 2–13), recording (tracks 2–13)
- KY - mixing (track 10)
- Nolan Presley - recording (track 10)

== Charts ==
=== Weekly charts ===
Chart (2018)	Peak position
Australian Albums (ARIA)	10
Austrian Albums (Ö3 Austria)	33
Belgian Albums (Ultratop Flanders)	27
Belgian Albums (Ultratop Wallonia)	113
Canadian Albums (Billboard)	1
Danish Albums (Hitlisten)	10
Dutch Albums (Album Top 100)	6
Finnish Albums (Suomen virallinen lista)	7
German Albums (Offizielle Top 100)	39
Irish Albums (IRMA)	5
New Zealand Albums (RMNZ)	5
Norwegian Albums (VG-lista)	3
Scottish Albums (Official Charts)	88
Swedish Albums (Sverigetopplistan)	3
Swiss Albums (Schweizer Hitparade)	22
UK Albums (Official Charts)	13
US Billboard 200	1
US Top R&B/Hip-Hop Albums (Billboard)	1

=== Year-end charts ===
Chart (2018)	Position
Swedish Albums (Sverigetopplistan)	87
US Billboard 200	64
US Top R&B/Hip-Hop Albums (Billboard)	38

== Certifications ==
Region	Certification	Certified units/sales
Denmark (IFPI Danmark)	Gold	10,000^{‡}
United States (RIAA)	Gold	500,000^{‡}
^{‡} Sales+streaming figures based on certification alone.
