= The Hate U Give (soundtrack) =

2018 soundtrack albums

The Hate U Give (Original Motion Picture Soundtrack)

Soundtrack album by Various artists
- Released: October 12, 2018
- Genres: R&B; hip hop; pop
- Length: 51:47
- Label: Def Jam Recordings
- Producers: Bobby Sessions (exec.); 6ix9ine; Amandla Stenberg; Audio Anthem; Bee's Knees; Cardo; Cubeatz; DJ Daryl; Doug Rasheed; Finneas O'Connell; Harold Scrap Freddie; Hudson Mohawke; Jailo; J Buttah; Kanye West; Logic; Metro Boomin; Mike Will Made It; Niko The Kid; PoST; Rice N' Peas; Teo Halm; Yung Exclusive

Singles from The Hate U Give (Original Motion Picture Soundtrack)
- 1. "The Hate U Give" Released: October 5, 2018

The Hate U Give (Original Motion Picture Score)

Film score by Dustin O'Halloran
- Released: October 5, 2018
- Studios: Newman Scoring Stage, 20th Century Fox Studios
- Genre: Film score
- Length: 48:26
- Label: Milan Records
- Producer: Dustin O'Halloran

Dustin O'Halloran chronology
Puzzle (2018)	The Hate U Give (2018)	The Art of Racing in the Rain (2019)

The soundtrack to the 2018 American drama film The Hate U Give, based on the 2017 young adult novel by Angie Thomas, consists of a soundtrack album featuring songs by various artists and an original score composed by Dustin O'Halloran.

The soundtrack album, The Hate U Give (Original Motion Picture Soundtrack), was released by Def Jam Recordings on October 12, 2018, one week after the film's limited theatrical release. It features several R&B and hip hop songs from various artists, including Tupac Shakur, Kendrick Lamar, Pusha T, Logic, Jadakiss, Travis Scott, Billie Eilish, 21 Savage, Offset, YoungBoy Never Broke Again, Keith Young, and the film's lead actress Amandla Stenberg. Also included are two original songs: the title track, performed by the soundtrack's executive producer Bobby Sessions, and "We Won't Move" by Arlissa. Sessions' contribution to the soundtrack came from his personal experience, following the death of his cousin in a shootout in 2012. With the film following the same theme, he wanted the music and score "to motivate the audience to speak up against injustice". The title track served as the lead single for the album, releasing a week earlier on the day of the film's premiere.

O'Halloran's score was released by Milan Records under the title The Hate U Give (Original Motion Picture Score), also on the film's release date. Both albums were positively received by critics and audiences.

== Original score ==
George Tillman Jr. felt that music was critical to the film saying "We're doing a movie about police brutality and about identity. Our performances were honest and authentic. so I needed the score to feel natural and realistic, not too Hollywood". Tillman Jr. recruited Dustin O'Halloran to score for the film, after hearing the score for Lion (2016), which received an Academy Award nomination. Though living outside United States, O'Halloran felt that incidents in the United States is being talked all over the world. He believes in free speech and the right to protest, saying "he wants to be on the right side of history". He called the score as delicate and "to breathe life into the characters and the bigger picture of the subject in a way that was honest and graceful, yet not feel manipulative in any way".

To represent the lead character, Starr, O'Halloran used piano, 40-piece orchestra (conducted by Nicholas Jacobson-Larson) and interspersed electronic elements for the score; he added "The film is following her journey so the idea is the score follows her conflict and the internal part of her, and the piano is definitely one part of that. Piano is so dynamic, such a great way to be singular, and it's so expressive. It can come down and represent a single person, so that ended up working well." An accomplished pianist, he played all the keyboard parts in the score. To represent Starr's family and her connection, he created numerous parts of the score, that felt warm. He added "The family represented in the story is very tight and close. The father is a strong, warm, consistent figure that just there so much for his children."

He added that there is also a tension and a feeling where things could possibly go out of control, especially post the shooting incident, which O'Halloran wanted to explore it in "a visceral and more contemporary way". His idea, initially wanted a full-fledged melodic score, but instead deviated and expanded the score with experimentation using orchestra, creating textures and bowing techniques, and created soundscapes with modulated electronics, so that "everything would be more like a feeling". He felt that working with Tillman Jr. was a highlight in his career, as he got several creative freedom on exploring new ideas and make few changes in the score. According to O'Halloran, "As Starr's journey moves forward, there's also something bigger happening. George was really trying to bring out the sense that things were bigger than her and that was what was helping her with the choices she had to make. It was something we were trying to represent in the score, going from the singular viewpoint but blossoming into something bigger. That's how she realizes she has to take a stand."

O'Halloran worked on the score when the film had a rough edit, and got few changes, "where three quarters of the way, the film was edited". He experimented the score during the film's editing, as "it was a chance to also for them to get music pretty early, before they locked the cut, to understand how it was working and maybe how that could shape the editing as well." He blended the incorporated songs from the soundtrack through the film, with blending modular analog synths. The score was recorded at the Newman Scoring Stage in 20th century Fox in mid-June 2018.

== Curated soundtrack ==
Danielle Diego, the head of music at 20th Century Fox, collaborated with Def Jam Recordings, who called it as "the pre-eminent hip-hop label", and said "While the film is a Black Lives Matter story, it's also about a young girl finding her voice. We were trying to find the right artist for the end of the movie, but we also wanted the hip-hop element in the film." Rich Isaacson, the executive vice-president of Def Jam had said that "the title of the film is based on a Tupac song, so it was important that they have Tupac music. Then there were opportunities for Def Jam artists to take the place of temp music, and of course they wanted to have original music that fit the emotions of the film. It worked out amazingly well." Music supervisor Season Kent said she wanted to define these two worlds that she was in and added "Director George Tillman Jr. wanted to set a vibe. These artists have really experienced these things, and talk about it in an honest way."

"I grew up in Pleasant Grove, a black community in southeast Dallas. When I got to the seventh grade my parents moved us to an all-white neighborhood in Dallas County. It was a culture shock. I hope the song, along with the film, will inspire young people to find their voice, speak out, and have these uncomfortable conversations about what's going on in our community, and hopefully motivate everyone to do something about it."

— Bobby Sessions, on his personal experience, while contributing to the track.

Def Jam artists Bobby Sessions and Arlissa contributed two original tracks for the album. The latter, who served as the executive producer of the soundtrack, had written and performed the title track, based on the real-life experience as his cousin James Harper was fatally shot by a police officer in Dallas in 2012. He used this opportunity to share the message coinciding with the film's theme as he hoped that "the audience will get inspired by the film and feel motivated to speak up against injustice", and further said "We have the power to fix our conditions. This is about right and wrong. I believe this generation will put an end to racism. I'm excited for everyone to watch this film." He added "I measure the success of my music based on how many people feel empowered after digesting the content, and was overwhelmed with the positive feedback that I've received" and felt music as "a tool to get the dialogue started". He also felt that the song and its inclusion in the film, will gain more attention in the awards season.

"When I was watching the film, I really saw that Starr (Amandla Stenberg) was this very young girl who was dealing with very adult problems... There's a real vulnerability there, and I sympathized so much; I felt that vulnerability when making "We Won't Move". But it's through those moments, it's through adversity that you really do grow and find out who you are. And that was a real inspiration for the song. Just through my own experiences, as well, I had to fall on my face many, many times to grow as a person. I just wanted that to be the real message: Things may be tough, they may be hard, but you will be stronger and you will get through it."

— Arlissa, on writing the track "We Won't Move".

Arlissa wrote the track "We Won't Move", after watching the film; while calling it as an uplifting track about triumph, Arlissa said that when Starr (Amandla Stenberg) is in a sombre state, she used to listen to depressing music as a form of catharsis. According to her, she used to play sad songs, so that she could tend to be emotional and helps to remove all the negative thoughts, adding that "I'll just get really kind of emotional, but it does kind of help me after I had a good cry. I feel like I can really reset and start again." Diego felt that the message was important, saying "These people are not without hope. It's about community, about family. We needed that emotional moment at the end of the film. It's an empowering moment for Starr. Arlissa captured that."

The song was co-produced by Mike Woods and Kevin White. In an interview to The Hollywood Reporter, the duo said "The title, 'We Won't Move,' says 'We're going to hold our ground, we're going to remain peaceful but vigilant,' " Woods explains. "Also, 'step by step, brick by brick, we're going to face these challenges that we are going through' — lyrically that conveyed what the emotion was for the song and for the scene. We knew as we finished our session that this was a great song with an important message." Initially, they recorded the song with Los Angeles-based musical artist Harloe providing the demo vocals, before Arlissa sung the track. They, however credited Harloe for selling the song to studio.

== Release ==
=== Marketing ===
As a part of promotions, Sessions visited the screenings of the film in United States, including a special premiere at New York City, where he felt emotional on watching the film, and said "I knew there was something of value I could contribute. I want my song to motivate listeners to make the world a better place." Arlissa performed the song "We Won't Move" at the 2018 Toronto International Film Festival, and also at the film's screening in London. Isaacson had said "We're inviting tastemakers, radio personalities, a who's-who in many markets, so we can create a cultural conversation about the film because it's so important to our brand, and to our artists." The titular track was released as a single from the album on October 5, 2018.

=== The Hate U Give (Original Motion Picture Soundtrack) ===
The soundtrack was announced in late September, and was released by Def Jam Recordings on October 12, 2018, a week before the film's wide release. The album cover art featured a still of Amandla Stenberg, with a red hoodie and black tops holding a billboard that has the title, with a white background surrounding. The cover art inspired from the film's official poster, is applied for the film's score album. The album was released in vinyl on December 21, 2018.

==== Track listing ====
Credits adapted from liner notes and digital booklet.

No.	Title	Performer(s)	Length
1.	"Hold On"	Pusha T featuring Rick Ross	4:45
2.	"DNA"	Kendrick Lamar	3:05
3.	"Hold You Down"	Jadakiss featuring Emanny	2:49
4.	"Only God Can Judge Me"	2Pac	4:56
5.	"We Won't Move"	Arlissa	3:50
6.	"Goosebumps"	Travis Scott featuring Kendrick Lamar	4:03
7.	"The Hate U Give"	Bobby Sessions featuring Keite Young	4:06
8.	"Keep Ya Head Up"	2Pac	4:24
9.	"Everybody"	Logic	2:42
10.	"Kill Moe"	Beau Young Prince	2:43
11.	"Ghostface Killers"	21 Savage, Offset and Metro Boomin featuring Travis Scott	4:28
12.	"Left Hand Right Hand"	YoungBoy Never Broke Again	2:42
13.	"Ocean Eyes"	Billie Eilish	3:20
14.	"Always"	Amandla Stenberg	3:47
Total length:			51:40

==== Additional personnel ====
Credits adapted from digital booklet.

===== Musicians =====
- Matt Schaeffer – guitar
- DJ Camper – keyboard
- Cardo – drums
- Yung Exclusive – drums
- Damian Lemar Hudson – background vocals
- Dave Hollister – additional vocals
- Kanye West – additional vocals
- Kendrick Lamar – additional vocals

===== Technical =====
- Blake Harden – recording
- Bobby Campbell – recording, mixing
- Ethan Stevens – recording, mixing
- Finneas O'Connell – recording, mixing
- Noah Goldstein – recording, mixing
- CA$HPASSION – recording
- Jordan Lewis – recording
- Jason Goldberg – assistant engineering
- Kez Khou – assistant engineering
- Tristan Bott – assistant engineering
- Casey Cuayo – assistant engineering
- Illuminati Hotties – assistant engineering
- Wes Seidman – assistant engineering
- Will Wells – assistant engineering
- Carlos Warlick – mixing
- DJ Quik – mixing
- Joe Fitz – mixing
- Mike Dean – mixing, mastering
- Derek Ali – mixing
- Tyler Page – mixing
- Ya Boy N.O.I.S. – mixing
- Tyler Gordon – mixing assistance
- Brian Gardner – mastering
- Chris Athens – mastering
- Joe LaPorta – mastering
- John Greenham – mastering
- Mike Bozzi – mastering

=== The Hate U Give (Original Motion Picture Score) ===
The score album was released by Milan Records on October 5, 2018, on the day of the film's release.

==== Track listing ====
No.	Title	Length
1.	"The Cycle"	2:43
2.	"Starr's Theme"	2:11
3.	"Kahlil"	1:12
4.	"Shots"	2:20
5.	"Interrogation"	2:47
6.	"Wake"	1:50
7.	"You're The Witness Starr"	1:54
8.	"Break The Cycle"	1:56
9.	"The Funeral"	2:11
10.	"My Best Friend"	2:42
11.	"Williamson Protest"	2:00
12.	"The Interview"	1:07
13.	"Keep The Family Together"	3:08
14.	"Reasons To Live Give Reasons To Die"	1:42
15.	"Maverick"	2:03
16.	"The Talk"	2:39
17.	"Testify"	1:57
18.	"Riot"	6:26
19.	"Resist"	2:46
20.	"Escape"	2:45
Total length:		48:26

== Chart performance ==
=== Weekly charts ===
Weekly chart performance for The Hate U Give (Original Motion Picture Soundtrack)
Chart (2018–2019)	Peak position
Canadian Albums (Billboard)	30
Japanese Albums (Oricon)	23
Japanese Hot Albums (Billboard Japan)	16
UK Compilation Albums (OCC)	44
UK Digital Albums (OCC)	27
UK Soundtrack Albums (OCC)	12
US Billboard 200	33
US Top R&B/Hip-Hop Albums (Billboard)	18
US Soundtrack Albums (Billboard)	5

=== Year-end charts ===
Year-end chart performance for The Hate U Give (Original Motion Picture Soundtrack)
Chart (2018)	Peak position
Canadian Albums (Billboard)	39
US Billboard 200	35
US Soundtrack Albums (Billboard)	18

== Accolades ==
Award	Date of ceremony	Category	Recipient(s)	Result	Ref.
Black Reel Awards	February 7, 2019	Best Original or Adapted Song	"We Won't Move" by Arlissa	Nominated	
Black Reel Awards	February 7, 2019	Best Original Score	Dustin O'Halloran	Nominated	
Guild of Music Supervisors Awards	February 13, 2019	Best Music Supervision for Films Budgeted Under $25 Million	Season Kent	Nominated	
Hollywood Music in Media Awards	November 15, 2018	Best Original Song – Feature Film	"We Won't Move" by Arlissa	Nominated	
