= Koo's Art Center =

Coordinates: 33.769116°N 118.185823°W

Koo's Art Center was an art gallery and music venue located at 530. E Broadway in Long Beach, California, USA. It was a 501(c)3 nonprofit art center that hosted events including fine arts, music (performances), film screenings, social demonstrations, and literary events. It had a dedicated gallery space that was changed monthly to coincide with Long Beach's Second Saturday Art Walk, and held weekly hardcore/punk/indie music shows.

== History ==
=== Santa Ana ===
Koo's began as a small art cafe in Santa Ana in the early 1990s, at 1505 N Main St. Santa Ana. It was founded by Dennis Lluy, Lou Bribiesca and Dan Montano. It had a living room area dedicated for spoken word artists and for bands to play. Koo's served coffee and snacks from its kitchen. It ran several programs: the 17th Parallel break dance group, SoapboXX, the Mural Project and the Awareness Through Arts and Community (ATAC) Program, and was the base for the Santa Ana Food Not Bombs. In 1998 Koo's was awarded a US$10,000 grant from MTV's Do Something Foundation to help fund its programs.

=== Garden Grove and San Pedro ===
By 2001 Koo's premises were no longer large enough for its activities, and it closed down in Santa Ana, It did not immediately relocate, but instead promoted shows at the Drop-In Center in Garden Grove, Sacred Grounds in San Pedro, and The Brown Brothers Building in San Pedro.

=== Long Beach ===
By 2003 a new, larger, permanent location was found, at 530 E. Broadway in Long Beach's art district. It accommodated an art gallery far larger than before, and larger music shows. As of 2015 Koo's had a fine arts gallery, a monthly performance art showcase called 10x10, and weekly musical events.

== Projects ==
Projects as of 2015 included:

=== Music ===
Hosting several music shows a week in a variety of different musical genres. Koo's hosted hundreds of musical performers over the years, including The Ataris, Atreyu, The Black Heart Procession, Braid, Bright Eyes, Death from Above 1979, Deerhoof, The Get Up Kids, Hum, Jimmy Eat World, The Locust, Melt-Banana, Pinback, Calvin Johnson, Chokebore, Cannibal Ox, Mr. Lif, Mirah, The Pressure, The Radioactive Chicken Heads, Sense Field, Some Girls, Thrice, Wesley Willis, Xiu Xiu, Death By Stereo, and Ink & Dagger.

=== Fine arts ===
Koo's hosted a monthly art gallery that is changed on the second Saturday of each month to coincide with the Second Saturday Art Walks hosted in the arts district of Long Beach every month.

=== 10x10 ===
10×10 was a performance arts showcase that allows for 10 performers to entertain the audience however they please for ten minutes a piece. These can include anything from spoken word to musical performances as well as ballet or painting.

== See also ==
- ABC No Rio
- 924 Gilman Street
- AAA Electra 99
