= Overnight (Logic song) =

2018 song by Logic

Single by Logic

from the album Bobby Tarantino II
- Released: February 28, 2018
- Genre: Hip-hop
- Length: 3:38
- Label: Visionary; Def Jam
- Songwriters: Sir Robert Bryson Hall II; Arjun Ivatury
- Producer: 6ix

Logic singles chronology
"44 More" (2018)	"Overnight" (2018)	"Everyday" (2018)

Music video
- "Overnight" on YouTube

"Overnight" is a song by American rapper Logic. It was released on February 28, 2018 by Visionary Music Group and Def Jam Recordings, as the second single from his sixth mixtape, Bobby Tarantino II (2018). It was written by Logic and 6ix, who produced the track as well. Lyrically, Logic discusses that his success in the music industry took years of hard work and did not happen by accident overnight, contrary to what others think.

== Music video ==
The music video was filmed in Maui and Tokyo. It was directed by Mike Holland, Justin Fleischer and Alec Schweitzer. Logic wanders in the streets of Tokyo, and relaxes by the pool at a tropical locale as well. At one point in the video, he also gets a tattoo.

== Charts ==
Chart (2018)	Peak position
Canada (Canadian Hot 100)	61
US Billboard Hot 100	68
US Hot R&B/Hip-Hop Songs (Billboard)	32
