= Wrist (Logic song) =

Single by Logic featuring Pusha T

from the album Bobby Tarantino
- Released: June 24, 2016
- Recorded: 2015
- Genre: Hip-hop; trap
- Length: 3:26
- Label: Visionary; Def Jam
- Songwriters: Sir Robert Hall II; Terrence Thornton; Arjun Ivatury; Courtney Milburn
- Producers: Logic; 6ix

Logic singles chronology
"Flexicution" (2016)	"Wrist" (2016)	"Sucker for Pain" (2016)

Pusha T singles chronology
"Drug Dealers Anonymous" (2016)	"Wrist" (2016)	"Circles" (2016)

"Wrist" is a song by American hip-hop recording artist Logic. It serves as the second single from his fifth mixtape Bobby Tarantino, and was released through Visionary Music Group and Def Jam Recordings on June 24, 2016. The song features vocals from rapper Pusha T, and was produced by Logic and 6ix. The song is also featured in the video game Madden NFL 17.

== Background ==
This song is a fictional story told by Logic, which follows the premise of a Colombian drug lord who is reflecting on his personal decisions during a military raid of his compound. In turn, Pusha T details the effect of that cocaine trickling into the hands of a young man presumably himself in the American projects whom in return, is distributing it as crack.

== Charts ==
Chart (2016)	Peak position
US Bubbling Under Hot 100 (Billboard)	20
US Hot R&B/Hip-Hop Songs (Billboard)	44

== Certifications ==
Region	Certification	Certified units/sales
United States (RIAA)	Gold	500,000^{‡}
^{‡} Sales+streaming figures based on certification alone.

== Release history ==
Region	Date	Format	Label	Ref.
Worldwide	June 24, 2016	Digital download; streaming	Visionary; Def Jam	
