= AAA Electra 99 =

Former art gallery in Anaheim, California

Coordinates: 33.8497°N 117.8691°W

AAA Electra 99logotype

AAA Electra 99 was an art museum, gallery and performance space located in Anaheim, Orange County, California. It was Orange County's only co-op art gallery/museum. The gallery closed in 2012.

AAA Electra 99's mission was to display any type of art without the hassles of having to sell, someone dictating what to display or what not to display, or artists getting ripped off and to act as a permanent venue for artists of all kinds to express themselves in a community setting.

A second branch of AAA Electra 99 opened in Las Vegas, Nevada, on December 7, 2010. It is a part of the Emergency Arts Collective at the Fabulous Fremont Experience directly in front of The El Cortez.

== See also ==
- Koo's
- 924 Gilman Street
