= The Incredible True Story =

Studio album by Logic
- Released: November 13, 2015
- Studios: 4220; United (Los Angeles); BlumVox Studio
- Genre: Hip-hop
- Length: 61:52
- Labels: Visionary; Def Jam
- Producers: 6ix; C-Sick; DJ Dahi; DJ Khalil; Logic; Oz; Sir Dylan; Stefan Ponce; Syk Sense; Tae Beast

Logic chronology
Under Pressure (2014)	The Incredible True Story (2015)	Bobby Tarantino (2016)

Singles from The Incredible True Story
- 1. "Young Jesus" Released: September 22, 2015; 2. "Like Woah" Released: October 14, 2015; 3. "Fade Away" Released: November 5, 2015

The Incredible True Story is the second studio album by American rapper Logic. It was released on November 13, 2015, by Visionary Music Group and Def Jam Recordings. The album features production by Logic, executive producer 6ix, Stefan Ponce, Sir Dylan, Syk Sense, Oz, and DJ Dahi. The album also features guest appearances from Big Lenbo, Lucy Rose, Dria, and Jesse Boykins III.

The Incredible True Story was supported by three singles: "Young Jesus", "Like Woah", and "Fade Away". The album received positive reviews from music critics and was a commercial success. It debuted at number three on the US Billboard 200, earning 135,000 album-equivalent units in its first week. It also reached number one on the US Top R&B/Hip-Hop Albums chart. The album was certified platinum by the Recording Industry Association of America (RIAA) in June 2021.

== Synopsis ==
=== Plot ===
By 2023, Japan and the United States merge to create a super-nation to combat famine, depleted resources and the increasing extinction in animals caused by the amplification of pollution. As the leaders in world science, the conjoined nations are able to create genetically engineered meat that is enhanced and grown in an unconscious state, which is then slaughtered for consumption. They decide that the quickest way to distribute the food to a worldwide scale is through China, as China interlinks with other first world countries in Europe and Oceania. China then uses their newly found power to their advantage, often overcharging the conjoined nation for its distribution route through the country. This prompts the conjoined nation to contact Russia, who have displaced democracy in favor of a royal family. The conjoined nation enters into a working agreement with Russia to assassinate the President of China, in exchange for Russian occupation of Alaska, which the conjoined nation reluctantly agrees to. Soon after, the President of China is assassinated and is replaced by the country's vice president.

Following the successful assassination, a secret treaty is to be agreed upon between the conjoined nation and Russia, to formally hand over Alaska. As soon as the Russian King arrives, however, he dies due to cardiac arrest at 59, which calls off the treaty. The Prince of Russia hears of the news and immediately suspects the conjoined nation, declaring war by firing nuclear missiles to land inhabited by the conjoined nation. As a result of the nuclear attack, the world's oceans become poisoned, forcing the remaining first world countries to move to and operate within free land in the Midwestern United States, alongside the Great Lakes. Dubbing the new city "Babel", they worked to purify the Earth's oceans, hoping to eradicate the issues that had arisen from the nuclear attacks.

A chemical is soon created, which adequately purifies the water to make it fit for human consumption on a wide scale. Following the creation of this chemical, billions of people begin to die, leaving scientists dumbfounded at the situation. Babel soon decreases from billions in population, to millions. It is later revealed that the genetically engineered meat previously created by the conjoined nation, reacted to form an inharmonious solution with the purified water. As the remainder of Babel calculated the rate at which humans are dying, the decision is made for the rest of the city's population to dissipate from Earth. By 2065, the residents work to create the Babel Space Station, which holds the 5 million remaining inhabitants, and left Earth in search of a similar planet.

The album follows Quentin Thomas, William Kai, and Thalia, who are listening to "The Incredible True Story" on their way to Paradise. They use the album as a backing track to the queries they have on life, often contemplating the point of finding Paradise, and what it will hold should they arrive. During the journey, they enter into the vicinity of another ship, an out of the norm situation due to the Aquarius III being one of the only remaining ships in current space travel. Thomas soon instructs Thalia to hack the system, before she stumbles upon a damaged audio distress signal located in its interface. Upon opening the signal, it details Christopher Smith, a pilot from Aquarius I, in his final hours, warning future travelers to suspend their journey and to return to where it was they came. Despite initially being shaken by the message, Thomas instructs that Aquarius III should continue. Following further travel, they arrive at a planet with similar conditions to what they were searching for and leave the ship. The album concludes with the trio successfully landing to what is now known as Paradise.

=== Cast ===
- Steve Blum as Quentin Thomas

The captain and pilot of the Aquarius III.

- Kevin Randolph as William Kai

The first man in charge of infantry on the Aquarius III, and Thomas' partner. He was named after the AKAI MPC 2000 XL musical instrument.

- Anna Elyse Palchikoff as Thalia

The name given to a computer program that operates the Aquarius III.

- Will Poulter as Christopher Smith

The deceased captain and pilot of the Aquarius I.

- Big Lenbo as Thalia

He appears in a cameo appearance, as a demonstration of Thalia's ability to become unisex.

- Big Sean as Thalia

He also appears in a cameo appearance, as a demonstration of Thalia's ability for the user to have a conversation with anyone in recorded history.

== Composition ==
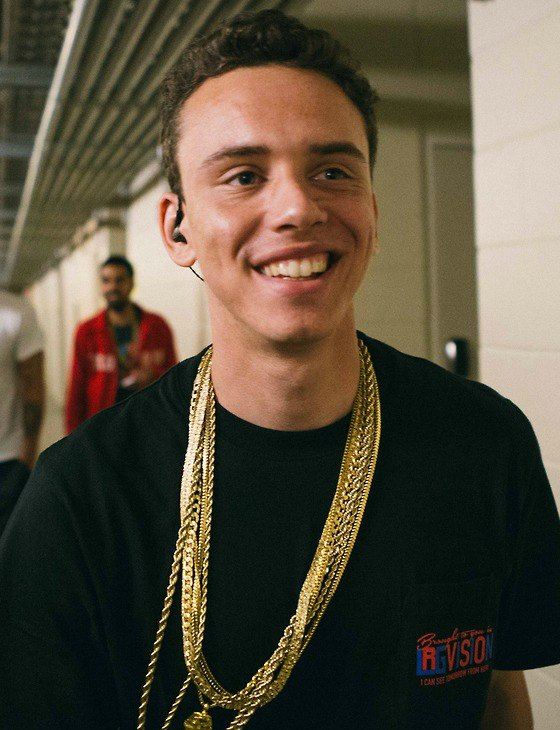
Logic was involved with a considerable amount of the production on The Incredible True Story, a move acclaimed by contemporary music critics.

The Incredible True Story was noted for its "improvement in production" and its emphasis to be "aesthetically pleasing [in terms of the music]" in distinction to Logic's previous works. Martín Caballero of The Boston Globe calls the album a success due to the way it was able to portray itself as "polished and appealing" material, in comparison to the "overeager and overproduced nature" prevalent in his previous releases. The album also represents a significant tonal shift, with Logic exploring duality across the album, introducing a back-and-forth of lighter and darker tracks. Insanul Ahmed of Complex outlined the album's sound calling the music "some of the happiest [Logic's] ever made, but there are dark undertones to songs like "Fade Away" and "City of Stars", which [mesh] together to create something special."

The album's production and lyrics also draws some multiple comparisons to various songs within hip-hop, which can be seen on "City of Stars" and "Paradise". The former has been described as appearing extremely similar to Kanye West's "Flashing Lights", borrowing the emphasized drums inertly prevalent in West's release eight years prior. "Paradise" was deliberately crafted to resemble the sound displayed by hip-hop duo, Outkast. "Paradise" openly references "SpottieOttieDopaliscious", a single from Outkast's 1998 release Aquemini. Logic had also wanted to reunite Outkast by featuring both André 3000 and Big Boi on the track, who began working as solo artists following the dissolution of Outkast. The duo were unable to contribute to the song, deciding against the reunification of the group.

== Promotion ==
Logic first announced the album on September 8, 2015, with a promotional video that said that the project would be released during fall of 2015. The video detailed Logic wearing his trademark NASA MA-1 bomber jacket, whilst being positioned inside a large spacecraft. He then proceeds to sample a loop which repeats, "I Am the Greatest", by Muhammad Ali on an AKAI MPC 2000 XL music controller. On October 24, 2015, the album and its tracklist was revealed on iTunes. Logic soon embarked on The Incredible World Tour in promotion of the album, travelling to various cities through the United States, as well to Europe and Canada. He also appeared on The Tonight Show Starring Jimmy Fallon performing "Fade Away" to the show's studio audience.

=== Singles ===
The album's first single, "Young Jesus" featuring Big Lenbo, was released on September 22, 2015. The song was produced by 6ix. The album's second single, "Like Woah", was released on October 14, 2015. The song was produced by 6ix and Logic. The album's third single, "Fade Away", was released on November 5, 2015. The song was produced by Logic.

== Critical reception ==
Professional ratings
Aggregate scores
Source	Rating
Metacritic	75/100
Review scores
Source	Rating
AllMusic	4/5 stars
Exclaim!	7/10
HipHopDX	3.5/5
HotNewHipHop	76%
Pitchfork	6.1/10
RapReviews	8/10

The Incredible True Story was met with generally positive reviews. At Metacritic, which assigns a normalized rating out of 100 to reviews from mainstream publications, the album received an average score of 75, based on seven reviews.

David Jeffries of AllMusic said, "This is the album where it all changed, as the one they call Young Sinatra comes into his own and proves his nearly perfect debut was no isolated fluke." Martín Caballero of The Boston Globe said, "With the creative confidence to go with his considerable skills and heart, Logic crafts some polished and appealing material.... Overall, a step up for the sophomore." Julian Kimble of Pitchfork said "The Incredible True Story is a pleasant voyage to Paradise orchestrated by an artist who's earned the approval of legends from Rick Rubin to Big Daddy Kane. Logic has the tools to create music that has longevity, but has yet to unlock the characteristics that truly set him apart. If he's able to tap into that, his subsequent releases will have the impact he aspires for."

Erin Lowers of Exclaim! wrote that "The Incredible True Story is Logic's best work yet, but there's still work to be done bridging the gulf between his ambition and his ability." Kellan Miller of HipHopDX stated "With every remarkable release, one can only hope that Logic will continue in this vein and not float too far into the stratosphere." Clara Wang of RapReviews said, "There's enough variation in energy and production to keep the listener engaged throughout, and several times there are sudden drops into another beat entirely in the middle of a song."

== Commercial performance ==
The Incredible True Story debuted at number three on the US Billboard 200 chart, earning 135,000 album-equivalent units, (including 118,000 copies as pure album sales) in its first week. This became Logic's second US top-ten debut. The album also debuted at number one on the US Top R&B/Hip-Hop Albums chart, becoming his first number one on the chart. In its second week, the album dropped to number 21 on the chart, earning an additional 26,000 units. In its third week, the album dropped to number 31 on the chart, earning 21,000 more units. In 2016, the album was ranked as the 63rd most popular album on the Billboard 200. On June 8, 2021, the album was certified platinum by the Recording Industry Association of America (RIAA) for combined sales and album-equivalent units of over one million units in the United States.

== Track listing ==
Credits adapted from the album's liner notes:

The Incredible True Story track listing
No.	Title	Writer(s)	Producer(s)	Length
1.	"Contact"	Sir Robert Bryson Hall II; Patrick Wolf; Stefan Ponce	Logic; Ponce	2:43
2.	"Fade Away"	Hall II; Gene Puerling	Logic	4:47
3.	"Upgrade"	Hall II; Arjun Ivatury; Gilbert O'Sullivan	6ix; Logic	2:53
4.	"White People (Scene)"	Hall II		1:39
5.	"Like Woah"	Hall II; Ivatury; John Cameron	6ix; Logic	3:52
6.	"Young Jesus" (featuring Big Lenbo)	Hall II; Ivatury; Leon Ressalam; Robert Diggs; Renee Scroggins; James Blake	6ix	3:35
7.	"Innermission" (featuring Lucy Rose)	Hall II; Ivatury; Dylan Wiggins	6ix; Sir Dylan	4:00
8.	"I Am the Greatest"	Hall II; Joshua Scruggs; Ozan Yildirim; Christopher Bear; Ed Droste; Chris Taylor; Daniel Rossen	Syk Sense; Oz; Logic	3:22
9.	"The Cube (Scene)"	Hall II		0:27
10.	"Lord Willin'"	Hall II; Ivatury; Wiggins	Logic; 6ix; Sir Dylan	3:28
11.	"City of Stars"	Hall II; Ivatury; Jim Diamond; Steve Hackett	6ix; Logic	6:16
12.	"Stainless" (featuring Dria)	Hall II; Ivatury; Scruggs; Yildirim; Dria Thornton; Christopher Thornton; Dacoury Natche	Logic; 6ix; DJ Dahi	3:19
13.	"Babel (Scene)"	Hall II		1:11
14.	"Paradise" (featuring Jesse Boykins III)	Hall II; Wiggins; Sam Hardaker; Henry Binns; José González; Donte Perkins	Sir Dylan; Logic; 6ix; Tae Beast	4:42
15.	"Never Been"	Hall II; Lawrence Matthews; Charles Dumazer; Dijon McFarlane	C-Sick	4:07
16.	"Run It"	Hall II; Dumazer; Richard Wylie; Anthony Hester	C-Sick	3:20
17.	"Lucidity (Scene)"	Hall II; Khalil Abdul-Rahman	DJ Khalil	0:55
18.	"The Incredible True Story"	Hall II; Ivatury; Sam Barsh; Jeff Gitelman; Daniel Seeff; Abdul-Rahman	DJ Khalil; Logic; 6ix	6:56
Total length:				61:52

Sample credits

- "Contact" contains elements of "Amazing", performed by Kanye West; and "Time of My Life", performed by Patrick Wolf.
- "Fade Away" contains a sample of "Deck the Halls", performed by The Singers Unlimited.
- "Upgrade" contains a sample of "Clair", performed by The Singers Unlimited.
- "Like Woah" contains an interpolation of "Liquid Sunshine", performed by John Cameron.
- "Young Jesus" contains interpolations of "U.F.O.", performed by ESG; and "Take a Fall for Me", performed by James Blake.
- "Innermission" contains an interpolation of "Life's a Bitch", performed by Nas.
- "I Am the Greatest" contains a sample of "Fine for Now", performed by Grizzly Bear; and a dialogue from the "I Am the Greatest" line by Muhammad Ali.
- "City of Stars" contains a sample of "Days of Long Ago", performed by Steve Hackett; and an interpolation of "Last Call", performed by Kanye West.
- "Stainless" contains a sample of "Backyard", performed by Travis Scott.
- "Paradise" contains a sample of "Today", performed by Zero 7 and José González.
- "Never Been" contains an interpolation of "Call on Jesus", performed by Lawrence Matthews.
- "Run It" contains a sample of "Maybe So, Maybe No", performed by Mayer Hawthorne.
- "The Incredible True Story" contains a sample of "What If Money Was No Object", performed by Alan Watts.

== Charts ==
=== Weekly charts ===
Chart performance for The Incredible True Story
Chart (2015)	Peak position
Australian Albums (ARIA)	43
Belgian Albums (Ultratop Flanders)	105
Belgian Albums (Ultratop Wallonia)	196
Canadian Albums (Billboard)	7
Irish Albums (IRMA)	79
New Zealand Albums (RMNZ)	27
UK Albums (Official Charts)	47
US Billboard 200	3
US Top R&B/Hip-Hop Albums (Billboard)	1

=== Year-end charts ===
2016 year-end chart performance for The Incredible True Story
Chart (2016)	Position
US Billboard 200	63
US Top R&B/Hip-Hop Albums (Billboard)	11

== Certifications ==
Certifications for The Incredible True Story
Region	Certification	Certified units/sales
United States (RIAA)	Platinum	1,000,000^{‡}
^{‡} Sales+streaming figures based on certification alone.
