= Under Pressure (album) =

Studio album by Logic
- Released: October 21, 2014
- Recorded: 2013–2014
- Studio: 4220; Logic House (Los Angeles)
- Genre: Hip-hop
- Length: 56:23
- Label: Visionary; Def Jam
- Producer: 6ix; Alkebulan; Arthur McArthur; DJ Dahi; DJ Khalil; Dun Deal; Frank Dukes; Jake One; Logic; M-Phazes; No I.D.; Rob Knox; S1; Skhye Hutch; Swiff D; Tae Beast

Logic chronology
Young Sinatra: Welcome to Forever (2013)	Under Pressure (2014)	The Incredible True Story (2015)

Deluxe edition cover

Singles from Under Pressure
- 1. "Under Pressure" Released: September 15, 2014; 2. "Buried Alive" Released: October 14, 2014

Under Pressure is the debut studio album by American rapper Logic. It was released on October 21, 2014, by Visionary Music Group and Def Jam Recordings. Development and composition of the album began in 2013, with recording taking place during a two-week span at the beginning of 2014. The album's production was primarily handled by No I.D., with smaller contributions from a variety of record producers, including 6ix, DJ Dahi, DJ Khalil, S1, Jake One and Dun Deal. The standard edition of the album contained no guest appearances; Big Sean and Childish Gambino were featured on the album's deluxe edition.

Under Pressure received generally positive reviews from critics, drawing particular attention to Logic's bluntness in his storytelling, its perceptive lyricism, and the album's toned-down production, resembling the ever-changing production of rap and hip-hop releases of the 1990s. It was also named one of the best albums of 2014 by several publications. The album debuted at number four on the US Billboard 200 chart, selling 72,000 copies in its first week. It was certified platinum by the Recording Industry Association of America (RIAA) in August 2020.

== Background ==
Between 2010 and 2013, Logic released four free mixtapes online and funded his own tours, through which he built his fanbase and reputation. According to Logic, the largest contributing factor to his rise to stardom was that he "hit the road and actually saw [the fans] face to face and shook their hands." He signed with Def Jam five months after the release of his Young Sinatra mixtape in 2011; a deal kept secret until 2013 because he "didn't want the fans to be like, 'Oh, he's going to change!'" Logic has metaphorically described Def Jam as his "bank", which does not interfere with his creative control or deal much with his publicity. Visionary Music Group, an independent label, managed and funded his audio mixing, mastering, touring, and commissioning of album art.

In 2013, Logic moved to Los Angeles to work on his debut album with Def Jam's No I.D., a mentor he later compared to Yoda. Several people advised Logic to make the album more personal than his mixtapes, inspiring him to write about his difficult upbringing in Gaithersburg, Maryland. On the advice of Don Cannon, he chose to maintain the album's personal theme by omitting guest appearances. Its title Under Pressure reflects the challenges of Logic's private life and rap career, while also referencing his belief that the album is "his diamond", as diamonds are formed by pressure. His prior mixtapes had dealt heavily with his biracial heritage, but he changed his focus from race to culture on the album. Rather than go "the radio route" with Under Pressure, Logic wanted to create a classic hip-hop album in the style of Nas, Wu-Tang Clan, A Tribe Called Quest, Big Daddy Kane, Kanye West and Big L. To help new listeners understand that his roots lie in this music, Logic tried to make Under Pressure more consistent and more quintessentially hip-hop than his mixtapes, which he found incohesive. Although he admitted to emulating other rappers on his earlier releases, he believed that the album would finally crystallize "the sound of Logic".

The album artwork was painted by Sam Spratt, an artist based in New York City. He was asked to depict the basement of Logic's friend Big Lenbo, where Logic had lived and recorded early in his career. Using photographs taken at that time for reference, Spratt painted a detailed reproduction of the space. The artwork's "half dark[,] half bright and beautiful look" symbolizes the two sides of Logic's life. Spratt wrote that he collaborated heavily with Logic to make the album's narrative "sync up on the art side". The title and track list on the album art were hand-written by Big Lenbo.

== Composition and recording ==
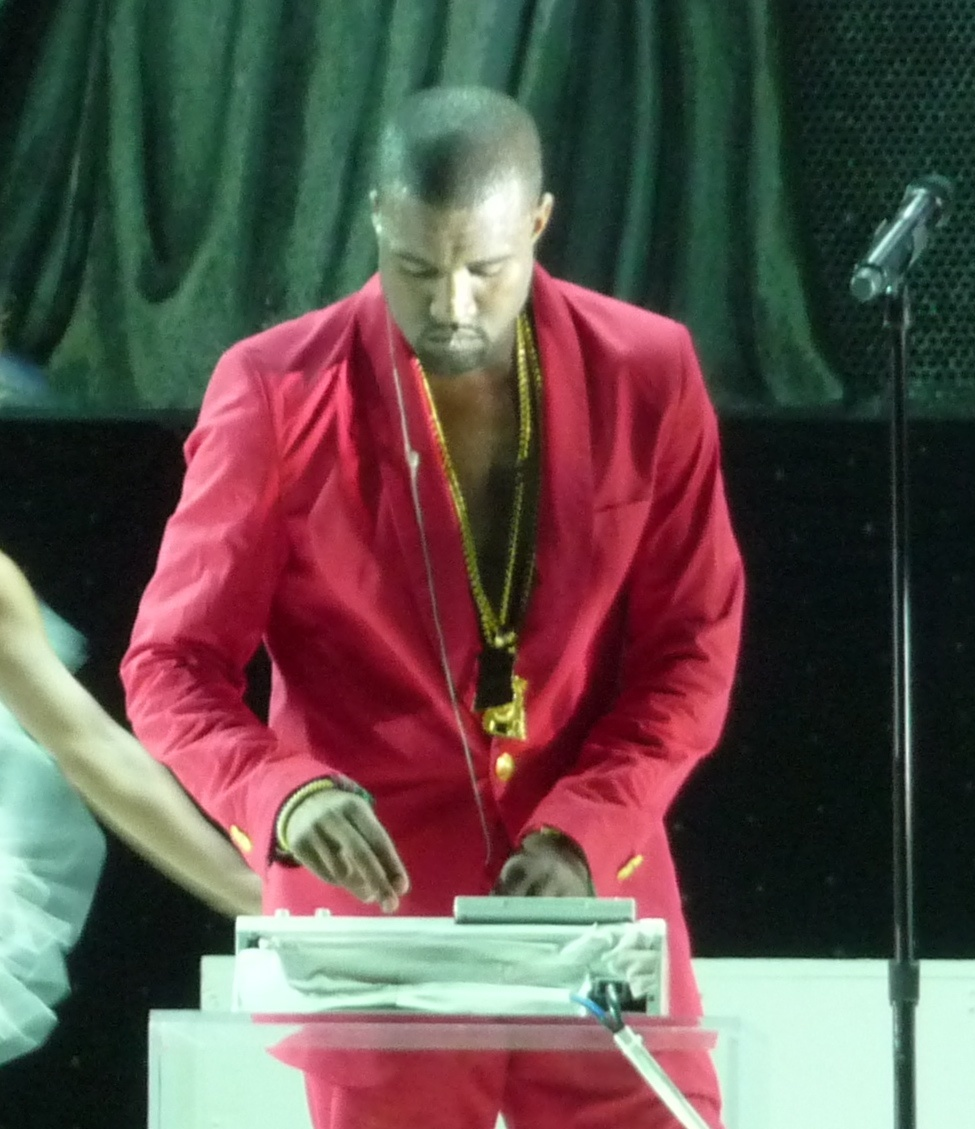
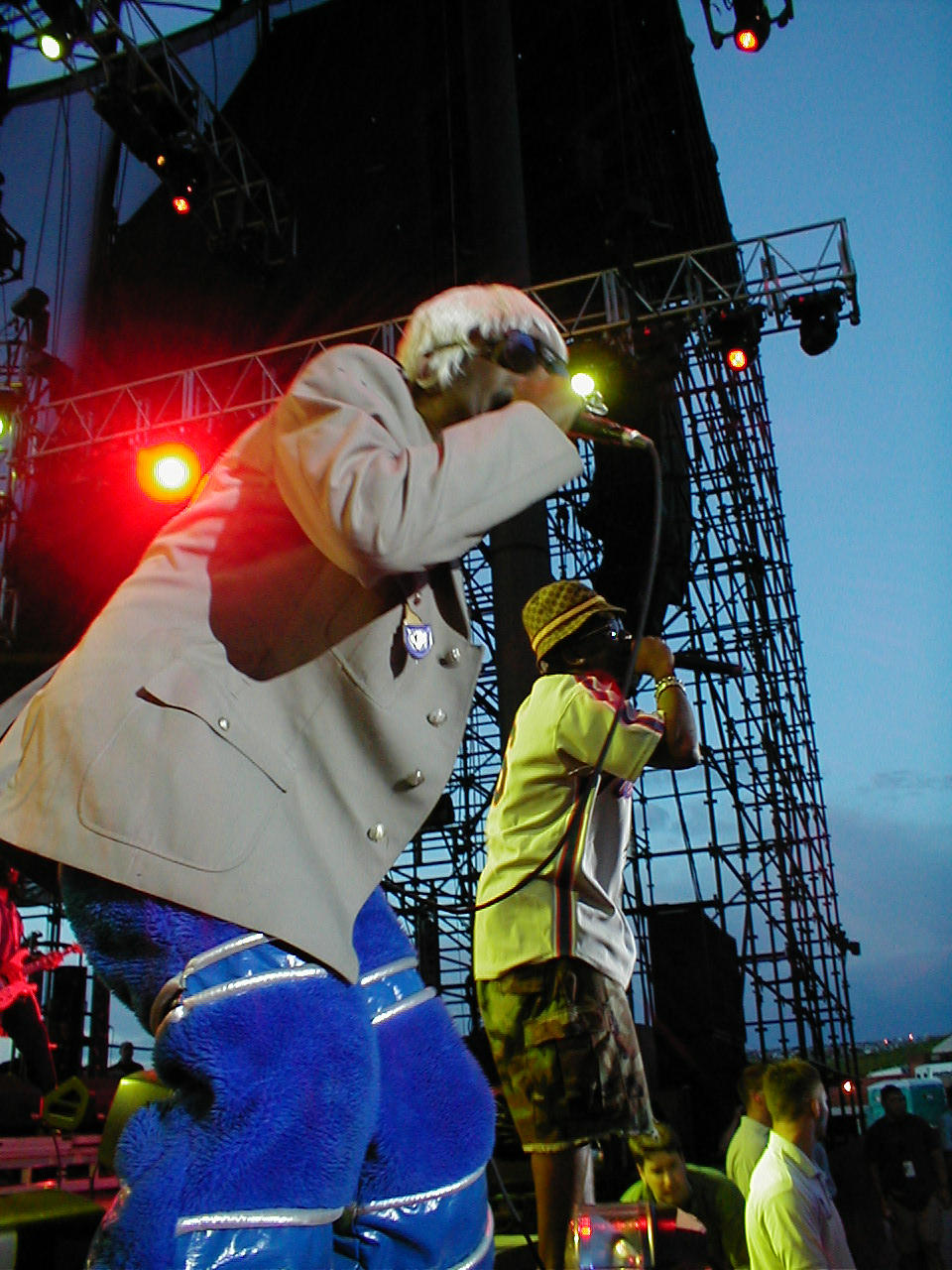
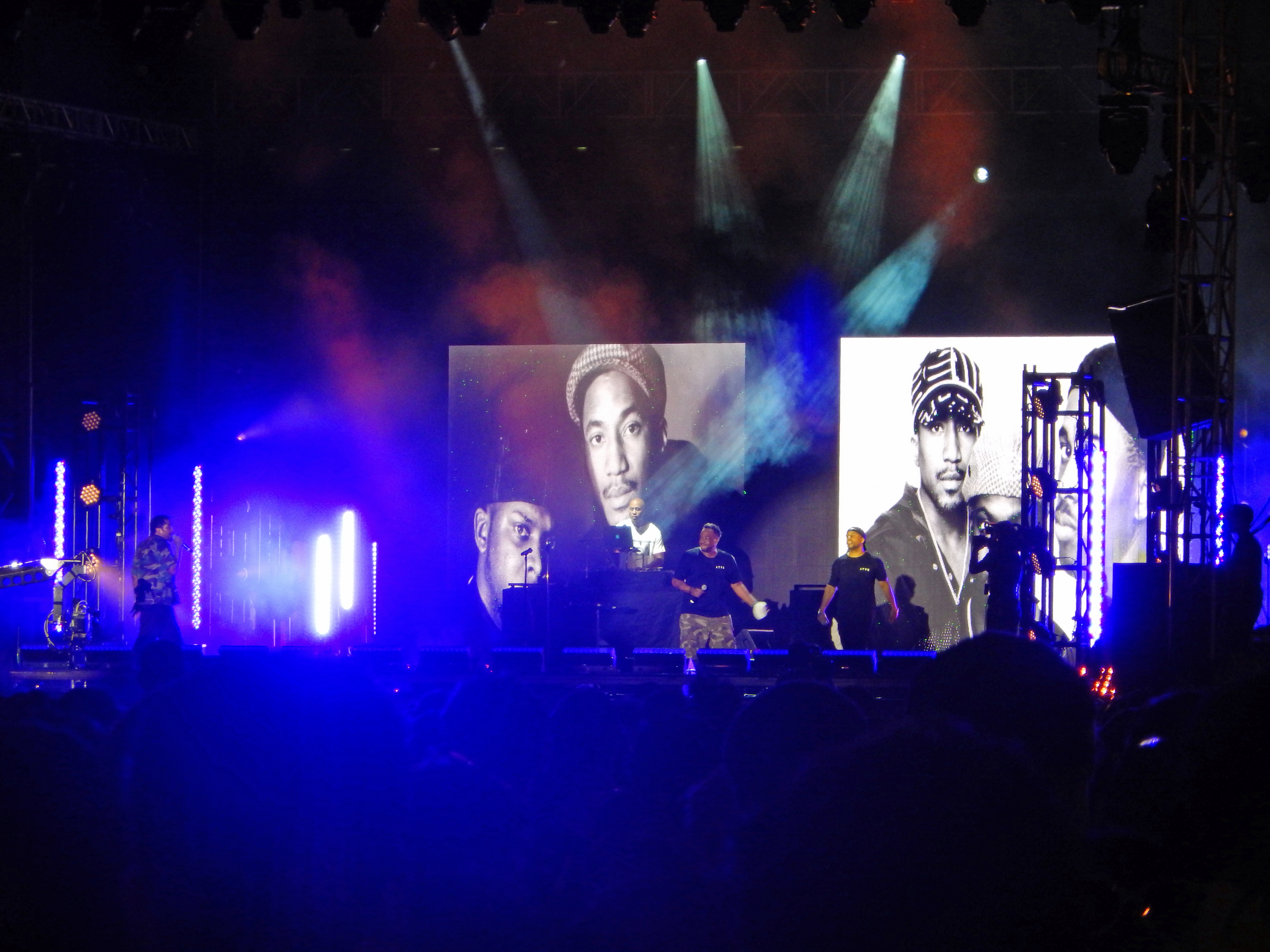

[[file: |0px]]

For Under Pressure, Logic drew inspiration from a variety of sources, ranging from Quentin Tarantino films to the music of hip-hop artists and groups such as Kanye West, Outkast, and A Tribe Called Quest.

While Under Pressure's development spanned several years, it was recorded in roughly two weeks. Recording locations included No I.D.'s studio and Logic's home, both in Los Angeles, and hotel rooms where Logic stayed while touring. No I.D. served as executive producer and exercised high-level oversight of the album, utilizing a loose management style that Logic compared to that of Quincy Jones. Although Logic found No I.D.'s advice and connections to be critical to Under Pressure's quality, he later clarified that "it was me and [Visionary Music Group producer] 6ix who created this entire album." During the album's development, Logic regularly watched Quentin Tarantino films and listened to A Tribe Called Quest, Outkast and Red Hot Chili Peppers. Other influences on the album include Kanye West's Late Registration and Graduation, Bone Thugs-n-Harmony and Kendrick Lamar's song "Sing About Me, I'm Dying of Thirst".

The first track to be composed was the nine-minute "Under Pressure", which Logic wrote and self-produced while on tour with Kid Cudi. After returning to the studio to work on the song in Pro Tools, an error caused a sample of Eazy-E's "Eazy-Duz-It" to play over aggressive drums, which Logic decided to use as an opening half to "Under Pressure". Live instruments such as guitars and cellos were then added. The two-halves of the track came to represent "the duality of man", as Logic rapped from the perspectives of both his hip-hop persona and his everyday identity as well as those of his sister and his father. The resultant song would "set the tone for the rest of the album", according to Logic.

Opening track "Intro" was initially based on a sample from the song "Aeroplane (Reprise)" by Wee, which Logic and 6ix had heard in Kanye West's "Bound 2". However, technical issues forced them to interpolate the sample. Work on track two, "Soul Food", began when Logic found the song's instrumental hosted on SoundCloud by rapper and producer Alkebulan. Logic obtained permission to use the track and polished it with his team. After they were unable to clear or interpolate a key sample, DJ Khalil was recruited to recreate it. The song's second half consists of production from 6ix which had been recorded a year before the rest of the track. "Intro" and "Soul Food" were placed together at the beginning of the album to create a jolting transition from a "beautiful and musical and melodic" song to "six minutes of raw lyricism".

For "Buried Alive", Logic selected one of 20 instrumentals given to him by Dun Deal, adding backing vocals recorded by Big Lenbo as well as additional drums. DJ Dahi provided several potential instrumentals for "Never Enough", and the "skeleton beat" Logic selected was built with interpolations of "So Fresh, So Clean" performed by Outkast and "Pursuit of Happiness" performed by Kid Cudi. "Growing Pains III", the third installment of Logic's "Growing Pains" trilogy, was produced by TDE's Tae Beast and 6ix. In the song, Logic speaks on his early life and the difficulties he experienced while growing up in his household. "Metropolis", a Rob Knox and Logic co-production, features an interpolation of Bill Withers' "Use Me" designed to add "thump" to the original song's drumming. "Nikki" samples Jeff Beck's "Love Is Green". The name "Nikki" is referenced in previous songs on the album, personified as a very close female until it is revealed that Nikki is an abbreviation for nicotine. The title track is the first single for the album and is produced by Logic himself. The song samples Eazy-E's "Eazy-Duz-It" and Grant Green's "My One and Only Love". The 9-minute, two-part track is widely viewed as the centerpiece of the album by critics and fans alike. In the first part, Logic speaks on his success and his compulsion to give back to those who helped him build his career, while the second part is him lamenting losing touch with his family as a result of success and finding out how proud they are of him. The album's closer, "Till the End", was the last to be composed and recorded. Husband-and-wife team The Frontrunners and producers S1 and M-Phazes contributed to the song's instrumental. Upon hearing the mastered version of the album, Logic reportedly cried, as it proved to him that he had succeeded despite his troubled upbringing.

== Music and lyrics ==
Growing up there were guns in the house, my brothers were out selling crack. I grew up on Section 8 housing, food stamps, welfare, and dealing with social services. I never had a Christmas, I never had a birthday.

— Logic

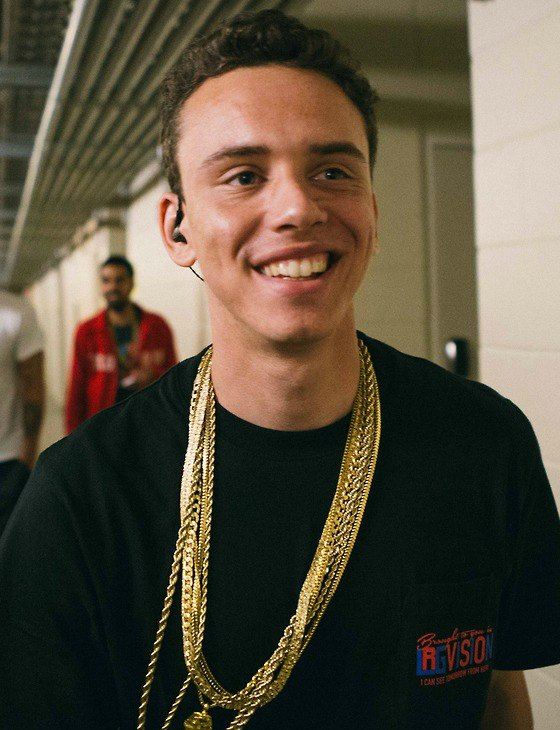
The album's autobiographical lyrical content detail Logic's life.

Under Pressure details Logic's life story beginning with his childhood in Gaithersburg, Maryland, and he has described its content as "extremely, extremely dark". Logic conceived "Gang Related" after watching Boyz n the Hood. Logic considered it to be "a gangster record" that subverts the glorification of violence common in hip-hop by describing the criminal activities and corresponding violence that had surrounded him as a child, while showing that he chose a different lifestyle. After completing the first verse, he was blocked on the lyrics for ten days, until he thought to rap from the perspective of his brother who had dealt drugs in Logic's youth. His brother agreed to the idea and provided him with stories from the period.

While on tour with Kid Cudi, Logic received numerous voicemail messages from his family, which he "transcribed damn near word for word" and converted into rhyming lyrics. As a fan of hip-hop braggadocio, Logic was initially uneasy about the results, but he chose to push forward with the idea. "Never Enough" was written as an "ignorant" track with a hidden meaning: it discusses the pleasures of "money, bitches, drugs [and] partying" but declares them insufficient for living a fulfilling life. Logic wrote "Till the End" about his difficulty breaking into the mainstream.

== Promotion ==
=== Singles ===
The first single from the album, "Under Pressure", was released on September 15, 2014, with a music video released on October 9, 2014. The album's second single, "Buried Alive", was released on October 14, 2014.

=== Other songs ===
The album's first promotional single, "Now", was released on April 8, 2014. The album's second promotional single, "Alright", was released on April 23, 2014, and features a guest appearance from American rapper Big Sean. The album's third promotional single, "Driving Ms. Daisy", was released on August 27, 2014. The song features a guest appearance from American rapper Childish Gambino.

=== Performances ===
On November 12, 2014, Logic performed "I'm Gone" on The Tonight Show Starring Jimmy Fallon, with The Roots as his backing band.

== Critical reception ==
Professional ratings
Aggregate scores
Source	Rating
Metacritic	72/100
Review scores
Source	Rating
AllMusic	3.5/5 stars
Exclaim!	9/10
HipHopDX	4.5/5
RapReviews	9/10
Rolling Stone	2/5 stars
Sputnikmusic	1.0/5
XXL	4/5

Under Pressure was met with generally positive reviews. At Metacritic, which assigns a normalized rating out of 100 to reviews from mainstream publications, the album received an average score of 72, based on eight reviews.

Sheldon Pearce of HipHopDX found a lot of depth in the album's storytelling saying "There are a great many moments that make Under Pressure feel like a feature film about Logic's life, and when at its best, it is creating that sort of imagery." AllMusic praised the production and Logic's storytelling throughout the album saying, "Under Pressure is an autobiographical and odds-beating debut that arrives more fully formed than expected." Erin Lowers of Exclaim! said, "Under Pressure finds Logic breaking out as an all-star emcee, raising the bar higher than anyone could've predicted." Clara Wang of RapReviews said, "When nostalgic old-timers lament the golden age of hip-hop, for those championing our current era, Under Pressure is the album to point to."

Eric Diep of XXL was compelled by the lyricism throughout the album, concluding with "Filled with persistent rhymes about his grind, it's a final warning that he's not going anywhere. For Logic, alleviating the pressures of critical acclaim just got easier." Christopher R. Weingarten of Rolling Stone said, "This album is all surface-level, free of sharp punch lines ("I been Hungary like Budapest") or metaphors that connect." In a negative review, a staff reviewer from Sputnikmusic said "It's not a verbatim copy of Kendrick's work, but it's every bit the stylistic counterfeit, and while it, along with the other mentions above, could be seen as imitations done in reverence had they been released on a free mixtape, their use on an album is no doubt a calculated effort to profit off of the ideas and work of another who did it first, in an attempt to capitalize on the ignorance of those listeners who may not know better." He did, however, continue by saying, "Outside of these disgusting faults, Logic's album isn't a bad effort at all, with few truly dull moments and good production and rapping from front to back."

=== Accolades ===
Under Pressure was listed at number 45 on Complex's 50 best albums of 2014 and number six on Vibe's list of 46 best albums of the year. HipHopDX ranked it among the top 25 albums of 2014.

== Commercial performance ==
Under Pressure debuted at number four on the US Billboard 200 chart, selling 72,000 copies in its first week. This became Logic's first US top-ten debut. The album also debuted at number two on both the US Top R&B/Hip-Hop Albums and the US Top Rap Albums charts, respectively. In its second week, the album dropped to number 31 on the chart, selling an additional 12,000 copies. As of October 2015, the album has sold 197,000 copies in the US. On August 7, 2020, the album was certified platinum by the Recording Industry Association of America (RIAA) for combined sales and album-equivalent units of over one million units in the United States.

== Track listing ==
Under Pressure track listing
No.	Title	Writer(s)	Producer(s)	Length
1.	"Intro"	Sir Robert Hall II; Arjun Ivatury; Norman Whiteside	6ix	3:02
2.	"Soul Food"	Hall II; Khalil Abdul-Rahman; Alkebulan Williams; Ivatury	Alkebulan; DJ Khalil; 6ix	4:52
3.	"I'm Gone"	Hall II; Ivatury; Arthur Ross; Leon Ware; Jacob Dutton	6ix; Jake One	4:42
4.	"Gang Related"	Hall II; Ivatury; Lawrence Parker; Praveen Sharma; Travis Stewart	6ix	2:47
5.	"Buried Alive"	Hall II; David Cunningham	Dun Deal; Logic	5:37
6.	"Bounce"	Hall II; Larry Griffin, Jr.; Mark Landon	S1; M-Phazes	4:04
7.	"Growing Pains III"	Hall II; Donte Perkins; Adam Feeney	Tae Beast; Skhye Hutch; Frank Dukes; 6ix	4:06
8.	"Never Enough"	Hall II; Dacoury Natche; Feeney; André Benjamin; Patrick Brown; Raymon Murray; Antwan Patton; Rico Wade; Scott Mescudi; Evan Mast; Michael Stroud	DJ Dahi; Frank Dukes	4:22
9.	"Metropolis"	Hall II; Robin Tadross	Rob Knox; Logic	4:55
10.	"Nikki"	Hall II; Ivatury; Narada Walden	Logic; 6ix	3:23
11.	"Under Pressure"	Hall II; Steve Wyreman; Rob Kinelski; Claire Courchene; Kevin Randolph; Robert Mellin; Guy Wood; Eric Wright; Andre Young; Lorenzo Patterson; George Clinton; William Collins; Bernard Worrell; Abrim Tilmon	Logic	9:19
12.	"Till the End"	Hall II; Griffin, Jr.; Landon; Diondria Thornton; Christopher Thornton	S1; M-Phazes	5:14
Total length:				56:23

Deluxe edition (bonus tracks)
No.	Title	Writer(s)	Producer(s)	Length
13.	"Driving Ms. Daisy" (featuring Childish Gambino)	Hall II; Ivatury; Donald Glover; Pharrell Williams	Logic; 6ix	4:00
14.	"Now"	Hall II; Ivatury; Jeremy McArthur; Steve Thornton	6ix; Arthur McArthur; Swiff D	3:33
15.	"Alright" (featuring Big Sean)	Hall II; Perkins; Sean Anderson; Antony Ryan; Robin Saville	Tae Beast	3:38
Total length:				67:34

Notes

- "Intro" and "Buried Alive" features additional vocals by Patty Crash and The Frontrunnaz (Diondria Thornton and Christopher Thornton)
- "I'm Gone" features additional vocals by Jessica Andrea
- "Growing Pains III" and "Never Enough" features additional vocals by Patty Crash
- "Metropolis" features additional vocals by Jessica Andrea, Patty Crash and The Frontrunnaz
- "Under Pressure" features additional vocals by Ill Camille
- "Till the End" features additional vocals by The Frontrunnaz

Sample credits

- "Intro" contains interpolations of "Aeroplane (Reprise)", written by Norman Whiteside, as performed by Wee; and "Midnight Marauders Tour Guide", performed by A Tribe Called Quest.
- "Soul Food" contains a sample of "The Champ", performed by The Mohawks.
- "I'm Gone" contains samples of "I Want You", written by Arthur Ross and Leon Ware, as performed by Marvin Gaye; and "Take A Win", written by Jacob Dutton, as performed by The Physics.
- "Gang Related" contains samples of "Carrot Man", written by Praveen Sharma and Travis Stewart, as performed by Sepalcure; and "Mad Crew", written by Lawrence Parker and performed by KRS-One.
- "Never Enough" contains interpolations of "Pursuit of Happiness", written by Scott Mescudi, Evan Mast and Michael Stroud, as performed by Kid Cudi; and "So Fresh, So Clean", written by André Benjamin, Patrick Brown, Raymon Murray, Antwan Patton and Rico Wade, as performed by Outkast.
- "Metropolis" contains a sample of "Use Me", performed by Bill Withers.
- "Nikki" contains an interpolation of "Love Is Green", written by Narada Walden, as performed by Jeff Beck.
- "Under Pressure" contains a sample of "Use Me", performed by Bill Withers; "Eazy-Duz-It", written by George Clinton, William Collins, Lorenzo Patterson, Abrim Tilmon, Bernard Worrell, Eric Wright and Andre Young, as performed by Eazy-E; and an interpolation of "My One and Only Love", written by Robert Mellin and Guy Wood, as performed by Grant Green.
- "Driving Ms. Daisy" contains a sample of "Spaz", written by Pharrell Williams, as performed by N.E.R.D.
- "Now" contains a sample of "Skycell", written by Asma Maroof and Daniel Pineda, as performed by Nguzunguzu.
- "Alright" contains a sample of "Cathart", written by Antony Ryan and Robin Saville, as performed by ISAN.

== Personnel ==
Credits adapted from the album's liner notes.

Instrumentation

- Kevin Randolph – synths (tracks 1, 2), bass line (track 1), pads (track 2), piano (track 11)
- Steve Wyreman – guitar (tracks 1, 5, 9, 10–12), piano (tracks 1, 3, 11), organ (track 1), lead guitar (tracks 1, 3), synth (track 2), bass line (tracks 2, 3, 5, 9), bass (track 11)
- Tom Lea – violin (tracks 1, 5, 9, 10–12), viola (tracks 1, 5, 9, 10–12)
- Claire Courchene – cello (tracks 1, 5, 9, 10–12)
- Dylan – synth (track 1)
- Terrace Martin – saxophone (tracks 7, 10)

Technical

- Bobby Campbell – recording (all tracks), mixing (tracks 1–13)
- Rob Kinelski – recording (tracks 14, 15)
- Casey Cuayo – recording assistant (tracks 14, 15)
- David Baker – mixing assistant (tracks 14, 15)
- Dave Kutch – mastering (all tracks)

Additional personnel

- Sam Spratt – artwork
- Nick Mahar – booklet insert, design, interior photography
- Jonathan Benavente – booklet insert, design, interior photography
- Tai Linzie – art coordination
- Dawud "Mr. Dashiki" West – art coordination
- Andy Proctor – package production

== Charts ==
=== Weekly charts ===
Chart performance for Under Pressure
Chart (2014)	Peak position
Belgian Albums (Ultratop Flanders)	173
Canadian Albums (Billboard)	8
New Zealand Albums (RMNZ)	26
UK Albums (OCC)	88
US Billboard 200	4
US Top R&B/Hip-Hop Albums (Billboard)	2
US Top Rap Albums (Billboard)	2
US Indie Store Album Sales (Billboard)	11

=== Year-end charts ===
2014 year-end chart performance for Under Pressure
Chart (2014)	Position
US Top R&B/Hip-Hop Albums (Billboard)	42

2016 year-end chart performance for Under Pressure
Chart (2016)	Position
US Billboard 200	193

== Certifications ==
Certifications for Under Pressure
Region	Certification	Certified units/sales
United Kingdom (BPI)	Silver	60,000^{‡}
United States (RIAA)	Platinum	1,000,000^{‡}
^{‡} Sales+streaming figures based on certification alone.
