= Flexicution =

Single by Logic

from the album Bobby Tarantino
- Released: June 14, 2016
- Recorded: 2016
- Genre: Hip-hop; trap
- Length: 3:39
- Label: Visionary; Def Jam
- Songwriters: Sir Robert Hall II; Arjun Ivatury
- Producer: 6ix

Logic singles chronology
"Fade Away" (2015)	"Flexicution" (2016)	"Wrist" (2016)

Music video
- "Flexicution" on YouTube

"Flexicution" is a song by American rapper Logic. It serves as the lead single from his fifth mixtape, Bobby Tarantino. The song features vocals from American singers Jessica Andrea and John Lindahl and was released on June 14, 2016, by Visionary Music Group and Def Jam Recordings. The song was produced by 6ix.

== Background and release ==
Flexicution is the combination of the words "flex" and "execution". It was created by Logic, who explained it on Twitter as "a term and funny made up word for killing shit". Logic began to tease the song on April 5, 2016 with GFuel in an interview containing a teaser of Flexicution. He went on to play snippets at various shows on The Incredible World Tour and teasing other snippets on his Snapchat before finally dropping the track on June 14, 2016.

== Remixes ==
"Flexicution" has been remixed by various rappers, including Futuristic and Snow Tha Product.

== Music video ==
The song's accompanying music video premiered on August 5, 2016 on Logic's Vevo account on YouTube. The video contains concert footage from his Endless Summer Tour.

== Charts ==
Chart (2016)	Peak position
US Billboard Hot 100	100
US Hot R&B/Hip-Hop Songs (Billboard)	33

== Certifications ==
Region	Certification	Certified units/sales
New Zealand (RMNZ)	Gold	15,000^{‡}
United States (RIAA)	Platinum	1,000,000^{‡}
^{‡} Sales+streaming figures based on certification alone.

== Release history ==
Region	Date	Format	Label	Ref.
Worldwide	June 14, 2016	Digital download; streaming	Visionary; Def Jam	
