= Gang Related (song) =

2014 song by Logic

Song by Logic

from the album Under Pressure
- Released: October 21, 2014
- Genre: Gangsta rap
- Length: 2:47
- Label: Visionary; Def Jam
- Songwriters: Sir Robert Hall II; Arjun Ivatury; Lawrence Parker; Praveen Sharma; Travis Stewart
- Producer: 6ix

"Gang Related" is a song by American rapper Logic from his debut studio album Under Pressure (2014). Produced by 6ix, it contains samples of "Carrot Man" by Sepalcure and "Mad Crew" by KRS-One. The song focuses on circumstances surrounding gang activity and its effect on people.

== Background ==
Logic conceived the song after watching the film Boyz n the Hood. He wrote and recorded the first verse that night. After completing it, he was blocked on the lyrics for ten days, until he thought to rap from the perspective of his brother who had dealt drugs in Logic's youth. His brother agreed to the idea and provided him with stories from the period. Logic considered the song "a gangster record" that subverts the glorification of violence common in hip-hop by describing the criminal activities and corresponding violence that had surrounded him as a child, while showing that he chose a different lifestyle. He chose to sample KRS-One's "Mad Crew" because he felt it would be "respected and revered" by people living in the streets and suburbs.

== Content ==
Logic raps from his own perspective as a child in the first verse, describing the crimes (notably drug dealing) and violence (mainly concerning guns) in his home that he grew up witnessing but how he never became involved in them, unlike other family members. In the second verse, he raps from the perspective of his older brother and explores him being drawn into gang activity due to challenges in their home environment, recounting that he was selling crack to their own father.

== Critical reception ==
The song received generally positive reviews. Erin Lowers of Exclaim! favorably noted the song has a "strong resemblance to the storytelling style of Kendrick Lamar's good kid, m.A.A.d city". Reviewing Under Pressure for XXL, Eric Diep wrote "Shades of Drake, Kendrick Lamar and J. Cole's free expression come to mind, but Logic's subject matter is just as eye-opening. The best example is 'Gang Related'". Sheldon Pearce of HipHopDX considered the song one of the "many moments that make Under Pressure feel like a feature film about Logic's life," adding that "when at its best, it is creating that sort of imagery". DJBooth had a more mixed reaction, commenting "I was expecting a harder song with a title like 'Gang Related.' (Maybe that is my own problem.) Not a big a fan [sic]. I was really into the pace and energy of the first three tracks, but this has a much different feel. Also, it's crazy to hear places you know from your hometown in rap songs. This must be what it's like to be from Brooklyn; too bad the record isn't more upbeat. A meaningful yet grimy song—powerful."

== Certifications ==
Region	Certification	Certified units/sales
New Zealand (RMNZ)	Gold	15,000^{‡}
United States (RIAA)	Platinum	1,000,000^{‡}
^{‡} Sales+streaming figures based on certification alone.
