= Under Pressure (Logic song) =

2014 single by Logic

Single by Logic

from the album Under Pressure
- Released: September 15, 2014
- Genre: Hip-hop
- Length: 3:49 (single version); 9:19 (album version)
- Label: Visionary; Def Jam
- Songwriters: Sir Robert Hall II; Steve Wyreman; Rob Kinelski; Claire Courchene; Kevin Randolph; Robert Mellin; Guy Wood; Eric Wright; Andre Young; Lorenzo Patterson; George Clinton; William Collins; Bernard Worrell; Abrim Tilmon
- Producer: Logic

Logic singles chronology
"Under Pressure" (2014)	"Buried Alive" (2014)

Music video
- "Under Pressure" on YouTube

"Under Pressure" is the debut single by American rapper Logic, released on September 15, 2014, as the lead single from his debut studio album of the same name (2014). Produced by Logic himself, it contains samples of "Use Me" by Bill Withers and "Eazy-Duz-It" by Eazy-E and an interpolation of "My One and Only Love" by Grant Green.

== Background ==
"Under Pressure" was the first song from its album to be composed. Logic wrote it when he was on tour with rapper Kid Cudi in fall 2013. He took inspiration from receiving many voicemails on his phone but being too busy to call back certain people, even his own family (i.e. his father and siblings). He finally called some of them back while in hotel rooms. Logic transcribed the voicemails from his family, nearly following the exact same words, and arranged them into rhyming lines. As he was writing a verse from his sister's perspective, which he originally planned as the first verse, Logic chose not to rap with the "braggadocios-ness" present on his mixtapes. After he finished writing the first version of the song, he returned to the studio and recorded it in Pro Tools. An error caused the "Eazy-Duz-It" sample to play over aggressive drums. Logic thought of it as a different song, and decided to use it as the first half of the song. He started producing other melodies with it and added live instruments such as guitars and cellos. The entire song in its original form was subsequently used as the second half. The two-halves of the track came to represent "the duality of man", as Logic rapped from the perspectives of both his hip-hop persona and his everyday identity as well as those of his sister and his father. As Logic was thinking about how to transition from the first to the second part, he created the chorus. According to him, the resultant song would "set the tone for the rest of the album".

== Content ==
Lyrically, the song details the pressures, stress and internal conflicts that Logic has dealt with in both his career and personal life. The second half includes two verses in which Logic narrates his family's voicemails to him, rapping from their perspectives, such as that of his sister who talks about being traumatized by her rape and dealing with her children hating her. Logic follows with a final verse that sees him responding to them, with the realization that he has missed quality time with family due to immersing himself into his musical work.

== Critical reception ==
The song received generally positive reviews. Zach Frydenlund of Complex wrote "Over a menacing beat with a catchy sample, Logic proves why he is one of the most impressive young talents in the hip-hop game through the use of his steady wordplay and strong flow." Erin Lowers of Exclaim! praised Logic's "ability to flip Eazy-E's 'Eazy-Duz-It' into a charged instrumental that balances the emotionally driven content." DJBooth had a favorable reaction to the production ("This beat goes so hard but is also so nuanced; he doesn’t sacrifice the technical aspects of production for more emotion. Instead, he finds a way to balance both."), structure ("The way the record ebbs and flows without losing momentum is amazing and it's because Logic is so surgical with his words and paces the song perfectly. It makes me think this one will stand out when it's all said and done.") and transition ("Again, flawless transition. The beat totally changes but the way he does it makes the records natural and easy to follow; he doesn't miss a beat so we don't either."), adding "This whole song feels like a mini-album! I had forgotten where we started until that throwback to the beginning. This is like a TV episode. Very, very impressed. I mean, he produced this shit too! It can't be easy to make a meaningful, cohesive nine-minute rap song, but he is responsible for the whole thing. This isn't my favorite song, but it's far and away the most impressive."

== Music video ==
The music video was released on October 9, 2014.

== Charts ==
Chart (2014)	Peak position
US Bubbling Under R&B/Hip-Hop Singles (Billboard)	5

== Certifications ==
Region	Certification	Certified units/sales
United States (RIAA)	Gold	500,000^{‡}
^{‡} Sales+streaming figures based on certification alone.
