= The Pressure (band) =

U.S. music band established in 1996

The Pressure was an American band formed in September 1996.

== History ==
The band played their first show in San Diego. During their existence, the trio lived crammed together in a tiny studio apartment in Costa Mesa, California, with their cat. The band played live several times on college radio, as well as television, where they not only hosted the alternative rock program Are-Oh-Vee twice, but would appear on The Gong Show. The energy of their live shows guaranteed almost continual coverage in the Orange County Weekly, which voted them one of the top unsigned bands in October 1997. In April 1998, a cover story asked, "Are The Pressure OC's favorite band?".

Their single, "I Wanna Call Someone" sold out of Orange County record stores the day it was released, and would wind up selling out completely in October 1998 after a deluge of European orders. Early in 1999, the band began working on their debut album with Alex Newport in San Francisco, a place where they had all originally lived. An appearance on the Vans Warped Tour 1999 that July, with Eminem, The Black Eyed Peas, NOFX and Pennywise in San Bernardino wound up being their last. The day their debut album Things Move Fast was released, drummer Jason Thornberry was found beaten nearly to death on the streets of Long Beach, and remained in hospital for several months. The band did not break up so much as break apart. Members Ronnie Washburn and Dana James went on to found Your Enemies Friends.

== Members ==
- Dana James – vocals, bass guitar
- Jason Thornberry – drums, vocals
- Ronnie Washburn – vocals, guitar

== Discography ==
- My Heart Was Lost, cassette, Self Service Recs, 1997.
- The Pressure, cassette, Corporate Corp Recs, 1997.
- "I Wanna Call Someone", 7" single, What Else? Recs, 1998.
- v/a Al's Bar Compilation, Vol. 2, Al's Bar Recs, 1998.
- v/a Styzine Compilation 1998.
- v/a Buddy List Compilation, 1999.
- v/a Brother Can You Spare Some Ska Vol. 4, Vegas Recs, 1998.
- Things Move Fast, Elastic Recs, 1999.
- v/a Orange County Weekly compilation 1999.
- v/a Sampler WE 20.0, What Else? Recs, (year?).
