= Everybody (Logic album) =

Studio album by Logic
- Released: May 5, 2017
- Genre: Hip-hop
- Length: 70:56
- Labels: Visionary; Def Jam
- Producers: 6ix; Bobby Campbell; C-Sick; Deats; DJ Khalil; Logic; No I.D.; PSTMN; Vontae Thomas; Wallis Lane

Logic chronology
Bobby Tarantino (2016)	Everybody (2017)	Bobby Tarantino II (2018)

Singles from Everybody
- 1. "Everybody" Released: March 31, 2017; 2. "Black Spiderman" Released: April 13, 2017; 3. "1-800-273-8255" Released: April 28, 2017

Everybody (stylized as ΞVERYBODY) is the third studio album by American rapper Logic. It was released on May 5, 2017, by Visionary Music Group and Def Jam Recordings. The album features guest appearances from Killer Mike, Alessia Cara, Khalid, J. Cole, No I.D., and Neil deGrasse Tyson, among others. The production on the album was handled by ten producers including 6ix and Logic.

Everybody was supported by three singles: "Everybody", "Black Spiderman" and "1-800-273-8255". The album received generally favorable reviews from critics and debuted at number one on the US Billboard 200. It is Logic's first number-one album on the chart.

== Background ==
On October 3, 2016, Logic revealed a working title of the album to be called AfricAryaN, stating the title was due to "being black and white, and seeing life from two sides. [It's about] cultural evolution [because] we all have so many different ethnicities in our blood, no matter how pure we think we are." The album's title received controversy upon release, with many voicing their displeasure at Logic's inclusion of the word "Aryan", and the historical connotations regarding the word. This rationale supposedly caused Logic to alter the title of the album, although he retained the name for the final song on the album. The album's cover art was painted by Sam Spratt, who used The Wedding at Cana, painted by Paolo Veronese as an example. Logic also conducted a contest for a fan to be painted on the album cover, which was won by a fan named Josh suffering with osteogenesis imperfecta.

Logic further elaborated on the album's concept in a subsequent YouTube video, revealing astrophysicist Neil deGrasse Tyson would star as God, and former San Francisco radio personality Big Von would play the protagonist Atom. It is explained that Atom dies in a car accident, and speaks with God upon arrival to Heaven. God informs him the only way he can move into the afterlife is if he can complete reincarnation into another life, to which Atom agrees. Later, he finds out that the deal involves living the lives of every single human being, to move on to the afterlife. This concept was inspired by the short story "The Egg" by Andy Weir, with the interlude track "Waiting Room" retelling this narrative.

== Promotion ==
The album was announced on March 29, 2017, with a promotional video that has been uploaded to YouTube, revealing the album's release date of May 5, 2017. After the album's artwork was revealed, rapper Freddie Gibbs accused Logic of making a trailer and album cover similar to his album You Only Live 2wice.

On May 12, 2017, Logic announced Everybody's Tour, a summer concert tour in support of the album. Logic headlined alongside frequent collaborator Big Lenbo and rapper Joey Badass.

=== Singles ===
The album's title track was released as the lead single on March 31, 2017. The track was produced by Logic, longtime friend 6ix, and PSTMN.

"Black Spiderman" was released as the album's second single on April 13, 2017. The song features a guest appearance from Damian Lemar Hudson, with Logic and 6ix, who also produced the track, alongside DJ Khalil.

"1-800-273-8255" was released as the album's third single on April 28, 2017. The track borrows its name from the former phone number of the National Suicide Prevention Lifeline. The song features guest appearances from singer-songwriters Alessia Cara and Khalid, with Logic and 6ix, who also produced the track.

== Critical reception ==
Professional ratings
Aggregate scores
Source	Rating
Metacritic	65/100
Review scores
Source	Rating
AllMusic	4/5 stars
The A.V. Club	C−
HipHopDX	3.6/5
HotNewHipHop	70%
Pitchfork	5.2/10
RapReviews	8.5/10
Spectrum Culture	1.5/5 stars
XXL	4/5

Everybody was met with generally favorable reviews. At Metacritic, which assigns a normalized rating out of 100 to reviews from professional publications, the album received an average score of 65, based on seven reviews.

Andy Kellman of AllMusic stated that "Keeping track of whether Logic's writing from his own or someone else's vantage can be a challenge, but one doesn't need to be that familiar with his work to realize that this contains some of his most personal rhymes." Andrew Gretchko of HipHopDX said, "Hip Hop's gatekeepers will say that timing and the repetitive nature of Logic's lyrics hurts Everybody but for Logic's younger core fan base, especially those going through struggles of their own, his latest work will be the catharsis to keep them from plunging off the deep end." Writing for RapReviews, Sy Shackleford concluded, "However he chooses to create his albums, both Logic's talent as an emcee and his insightfulness can't be denied." Preezy, an author for XXL, said, "Complete with unbridled lyricism, top-notch production and conceptual brilliance to tie it all together, Everybody is a hallmark release that further solidifies Logic solid standing in hip-hop."

In a review from The A.V. Club, Clayton Purdom noted that ""Amiable" is sort of the operant word for Everybody, which, like Joey Badass' All-Amerikkkan Badass, strives to create a trenchant pop-rap polemic for the Trump era, but unlike that record—or any other record ever, for that matter—frequently gets lost in minutes-long spoken-word segues in which Neil deGrasse Tyson speaks as a benevolent god about the nature of self-worth." Sheldon Pearce of Pitchfork said, "Aside from its more sociopolitical shortcomings, Everybody refuses to stop and evaluate why it exists in the first place. A lot has been made of Logic's technical skill, but it can't really be considered proficiency if it isn't efficient."

== Commercial performance ==
Everybody debuted at number one on the US Billboard 200 with 247,000 album-equivalent units, of which 196,000 were pure album sales in its first week. It is Logic's first number-one album on the chart. The album also set the record for largest second week drop of all time, as pure sales fell 96% to just 8,000 copies. On March 26, 2018, the album was certified platinum by the Recording Industry Association of America (RIAA) for combined sales, streaming and track-sales equivalent of a million units in the United States.

== Track listing ==
Credits were adapted from the album's liner notes.

Everybody track listing
No.	Title	Writer(s)	Producer(s)	Length
1.	"Hallelujah"	Sir Robert Hall II; Arjun Ivatury	6ix; Logic	7:28
2.	"Everybody"	Hall II; Ivatury; Kyle Metcalfe	Logic; 6ix; PSTMN	2:42
3.	"Confess" (featuring Killer Mike)	Hall II; Ivatury; Christopher Thornton; Diondria Thornton; Michael Render	6ix; Logic	5:43
4.	"Killing Spree" (featuring Ansel Elgort)	Hall II; Ivatury; Darrel Alston; Adjane Rafael; Ansel Elgort	6ix; Logic; Vontae Thomas	3:26
5.	"Take It Back"	Hall II; Ivatury; Bobby Campbell	6ix; Campbell	6:40
6.	"America" (featuring Black Thought, Chuck D, Big Lenbo and No I.D.)	Hall II; Ivatury; Ernest Wilson; Tariq Trotter; Carlton Ridenhour; Leon Ressalam; Kevin McKenzie; Shawn McKenzie; Paul Mitchell	Logic; 6ix; No I.D.	5:31
7.	"Ink Blot" (featuring Juicy J)	Hall II; Ivatury; Dominik Patrzek; Shuntaro Tanikawa; Michi Tanaka; Jordan Houston	6ix; Deats	2:36
8.	"Mos Definitely"	Hall II; Charles Dumazer; Khalil Abdul-Rahman; Sam Barsh; Daniel Seeff; Quincy Jones; Alan Bergman; Marilyn Bergman	C-Sick; DJ Khalil	3:26
9.	"Waiting Room"	Hall II	Logic	4:43
10.	"1-800-273-8255" (featuring Alessia Cara and Khalid)	Hall II; Ivatury; Alessia Caracciolo; Khalid Robinson; Dylan Wiggins; Andrew Taggart	Logic; 6ix	4:10
11.	"Anziety" (featuring Lucy Rose)	Hall II; Ivatury; Nima Jahanbin; Paimon Jahanbin; William Smith; Lucy Rose	6ix; Logic; Wallis Lane	6:52
12.	"Black Spiderman" (featuring Damian Lemar Hudson)	Hall II; Ivatury; Abdul-Rahman; Sam Barsh; Damian Lemar Hudson	Logic; 6ix; DJ Khalil	5:31
13.	"AfricAryaN" (featuring Neil deGrasse Tyson)	Hall II; Ivatury; Jermaine Cole; Neil deGrasse Tyson	6ix; Logic	12:08
Total length:				70:56

Deluxe edition
No.	Title	Length
14.	"Everybody Documentary" (video)	46:05
Total length:		117:01

Notes

- "Everybody" features background vocals from Damian Lemar Hudson, Diondria Thornton, Christopher Thornton, William Wells and Lucy Rose
- "Confess" features background vocals from Lucy Rose
- "Black Spiderman" features background vocals from Dylan Wiggins, Patrick Starrr, Christopher Thornton, William Wells, Jessica Hall and Chris Zarou
- "AfricAryaN" features an uncredited verse and production by J. Cole

Sample credits

- "Hallelujah" contains a sample from "Flying High", performed by Travis Scott.
- "America" contains an interpolation of "Live at the Barbeque", written by Kevin McKenzie, Shawn McKenzie and Paul Mitchell.
- "Ink Blot" contains a sample from "Kodomo", performed by Carmen Maki.
- "Mos Definitely" contains an interpolation of "Maybe Tomorrow", written by Quincy Jones, Alan Bergman and Marilyn Bergman.
- "Anziety" contains elements from "Color One Tear Black", performed by Double O's Demingo's.

== Charts ==
=== Weekly charts ===
Chart performance for Everybody
Chart (2017)	Peak position
Australian Albums (ARIA)	25
Belgian Albums (Ultratop Flanders)	63
Belgian Albums (Ultratop Wallonia)	172
Canadian Albums (Billboard)	4
Czech Albums (ČNS IFPI)	73
Danish Albums (Hitlisten)	6
Dutch Albums (Album Top 100)	22
Finnish Albums (Suomen virallinen lista)	21
French Albums (SNEP)	196
Irish Albums (IRMA)	13
Latvian Albums (LaIPA)	25
New Zealand Albums (RMNZ)	14
Norwegian Albums (VG-lista)	12
Scottish Albums (Official Charts)	41
South Korean Albums International (Gaon)	7
Swedish Albums (Sverigetopplistan)	12
Swiss Albums (Schweizer Hitparade)	42
UK Albums (Official Charts)	20
UK R&B Albums (Official Charts)	2
US Billboard 200	1
US Top R&B/Hip-Hop Albums (Billboard)	1

=== Year-end charts ===
2017 year-end chart performance for Everybody
Chart (2017)	Position
Danish Albums (Hitlisten)	42
Swedish Albums (Sverigetopplistan)	77
US Billboard 200	25
US Top R&B/Hip-Hop Albums (Billboard)	12

2018 year-end chart performance for Everybody
Chart (2018)	Position
US Billboard 200	142
US Top R&B/Hip-Hop Albums (Billboard)	62

== Certifications ==
Certifications for Everybody
Region	Certification	Certified units/sales
Denmark (IFPI Danmark)	Platinum	20,000^{‡}
United States (RIAA)	Platinum	1,000,000^{‡}
^{‡} Sales+streaming figures based on certification alone.
