= Bobby Tarantino =

Mixtape by Logic
- Released: July 1, 2016
- Recorded: 2015–2016
- Genre: Hip-hop; trap
- Length: 32:24
- Label: Visionary; Def Jam
- Producer: 6ix (also exec.); Logic (also exec.)

Logic chronology
| The Incredible True Story (2015) | Bobby Tarantino (2016) | Everybody (2017) |

Singles from Bobby Tarantino
- 1. "Flexicution" Released: June 14, 2016; 2. "Wrist" Released: June 24, 2016

Bobby Tarantino is the fifth mixtape by American rapper Logic. It was released on July 1, 2016, through Visionary Music Group and Def Jam Recordings. It was released to various digital platforms without prior announcement. Bobby Tarantino serves as Logic's first mixtape since Young Sinatra: Welcome to Forever (2013). The mixtape and its production was handled primarily by Logic and 6ix, with the duo focusing on a similar style to that of their previous independent projects, working on reinstating previous elements considered missing from Logic's commercial releases.

Bobby Tarantino was preceded by the release of "Flexicution" and "Wrist", released ten days apart from one another. The mixtape received generally positive reviews from critics, with particular attention being drawn to its production and varied nature, as well as Logic's newly found braggadocio. Criticism was directed at basic lyricism and a lack of depth that was associated with Logic's preceding releases. It was labeled the "perfect fill in for his junior album".

== Background and release ==
Upon the conclusion of "The Incredible World Tour" that took place earlier in 2016, Logic announced the future tours of the United States alongside G-Eazy and ProdaG. Dubbing the "Endless Summer Tour", it would feature Yo Gotti and YG as opening acts, with other special guests. The group appeared at 22 shows across the United States, with a singular show in Toronto.

Preceding the announcement of the summer tour, Logic suffered a panic attack when waiting to view Star Wars: The Force Awakens. After being rushed to a nearby hospital, Logic deemphasized the impact of his attack by attributing it to attacks he would receive as a child. Remaining insistent to continue the tour, Logic's health deteriorated further, eventually inducing him into a state of derealization. Doctors attributed his poor state of health due to the consistent touring, performing and high pressure situations associated with music and its live environment. Logic soon took time off, and detailed its rationale in an interview, stating: "[I've] gone my entire life, especially the last seven years, professionally, without a break. Literally, I got married and a week later, I jumped on a tour bus instead of taking my wife to an awesome exotic place [in favor of] [seeing] my fans, over the span of two weeks, over the entire country, playing my album before it came out, for the fans. I put the fans before my health, the music before my health, and the work ethic before my health. There was so much on my shoulders that it really began to weigh down, and [that's not good]."

== Commercial performance ==
In his home country of United States, Bobby Tarantino debuted at number 16 on the US Billboard 200 chart, with 19,000 album-equivalent units (including 8,000 copies as pure album sales) in its first week. This became the third highest debut of the week. In its third week, the mixtape jumped to number 12 on the chart, earning 26,000 album-equivalent units. It was the eighth best-selling album and second best-selling digital album of the week, selling 16,000 copies. In its fourth week, the mixtape dropped to number 20 on the chart, earning 16,000 more units. On August 7, 2020, the mixtape was certified gold by the Recording Industry Association of America (RIAA) for combined sales and album-equivalent units over 500,000 units in the United States.

== Track listing ==
Credits adapted from Genius, which have since been verified by Logic.

| No. | Title | Length |
|---|---|---|
| 1. | "Illuminatro" | 0:48 |
| 2. | "Flexicution" | 3:39 |
| 3. | "The Jam" | 3:58 |
| 4. | "Slave II" | 3:17 |
| 5. | "A Word from Our Sponsor" | 3:02 |
| 6. | "Wrist" (featuring Pusha T) | 3:26 |
| 7. | "Super Mario World" | 2:58 |
| 8. | "Studio Ambience at Night: Malibu" | 0:56 |
| 9. | "44 Bars" | 3:02 |
| 10. | "Slave" | 3:00 |
| 11. | "Deeper Than Money" | 4:18 |
| Total length: | | 32:24 |

Notes

- "Illuminatro" is stylized in lowercase
- "Illuminatro" features additional vocals from John Lindahl and background vocals from Jessica Andrea
- "Flexicution" features additional vocals from Jessica Andrea and John Lindahl
- "A Word From Our Sponsor" features additional vocals by George DeNoto

Sample credits

- "The Jam" contains samples of "Mad Crew" performed by KRS-One; and "Gang Related" performed by Logic.
- "Slave II" originally contains a sample of "Rambo" performed by Bryson Tiller; however, Logic and 6ix were forced to alter the beat due to complications with Def Jam.
- "44 Bars" contains a sample of "Vibes Is Right" performed by Barrington Levy.

== Charts ==
=== Weekly charts ===
| Chart (2016) | Peak position |
|---|---|
| Canadian Albums (Billboard) | 50 |
| New Zealand Heatseekers Albums (RMNZ) | 1 |
| US Billboard 200 | 12 |
| US Top R&B/Hip-Hop Albums (Billboard) | 2 |

=== Year-end charts ===
| Chart (2016) | Position |
|---|---|
| US Billboard 200 | 162 |
| US Top R&B/Hip-Hop Albums (Billboard) | 51 |

== Certifications ==
Certifications for Bobby Tarantino
| Region | Certification | Certified units/sales |
|---|---|---|
| United States (RIAA) | Gold | 500,000^{‡} |
^{‡} Sales+streaming figures based on certification alone.
