= Isan (band) =

English electronic music duo

Isan (sometimes written isan or ISAN) are an English electronic music duo. The name was initially explained as Integrated Services Analogue Network – a play on ISDN, reflecting their preference for analogue synthesisers.

Robin Saville and Antony Ryan initially met in Leicester and later began making music as Isan in 1996, and have released several singles and albums since then, mainly for Morr Music. Saville now lives in Leiston and Ryan, who is also part of Seavault, in Fredericia, Denmark – since the band's inception, the two musicians have lived in different parts of Europe, working separately and collaborating using the internet.

== Discography ==
=== Albums ===
Release date	Title	Label	Notes
1998	Beautronics	Tugboat Records	
1999	Digitalis	Liquefaction Empire	reissued on CD by Darla Records
1999	Salamander	Morr	
2001	Salle d'Isan	Morr	mini-album
2001	Lucky Cat	Morr	
2002	Clockwork Menagerie	Morr	compilation of early singles
2004	Meet Next Life	Morr	
2006	Plans Drawn in Pencil	Morr	
2010	Glow in the Dark Safari Set	Morr	
2016	Glass Bird Movement	Morr	
2019	Lamenting Machine	Morr	

=== Single ===
- Trois Gymnopedies (7") (Morr, 2006)

=== Remixes ===
- Int (Arc Mix) on Refract!ons (CD on Disasters by Choice Records) Layer remix 2005
- Underwater (7") Televise remix (2007)
