= Adaptations of Moby-Dick =

Moby-Dick is an 1851 novel by Herman Melville that describes the voyage of the whaleship Pequod, led by Captain Ahab, who leads his crew on a hunt for the whale Moby Dick. There have been a number of adaptations of Moby-Dick in various media.

== Film ==
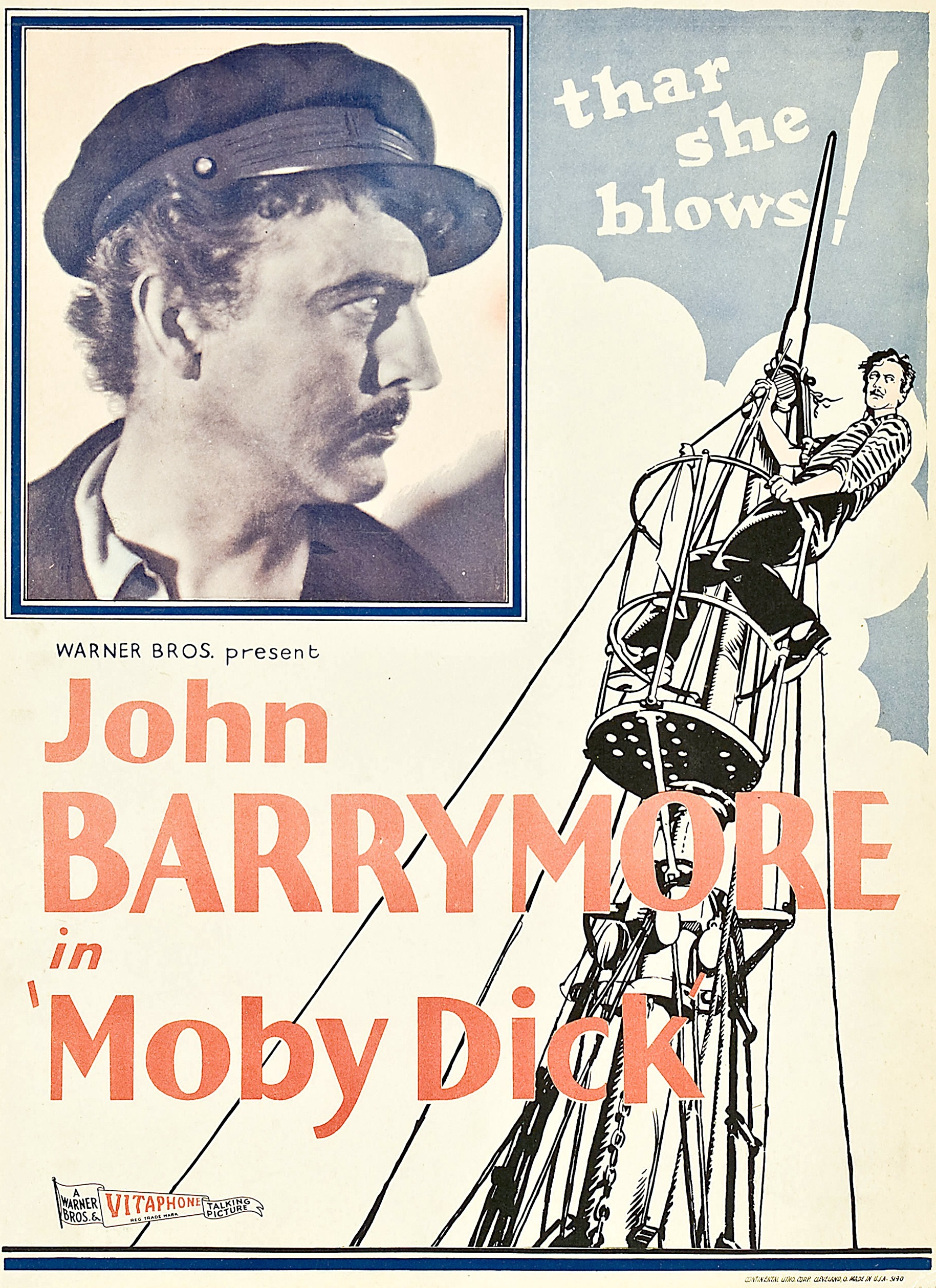
Moby Dick (1930)

- A 1926 silent film entitled The Sea Beast, starring John Barrymore as a heroic Ahab with a fiancée and an evil brother, loosely based on the novel. Remade as Moby Dick in 1930, a version in which Ahab kills the whale and returns home to the woman he loves (played by Joan Bennett).
- Moby Dick, a 1956 film directed by John Huston and starring Gregory Peck as Captain Ahab, with screenplay by Ray Bradbury.
- The 1961 Akutagawa Prize winning Japanese novel The Whale God, which was later made into a tokusatsu film by Daiei Film, featured battles between an unusually large and powerful North Pacific right whale and whalers who seeks revenge on the whale. Its plot was presumably inspired by Moby-Dick.
- Moby Dick, an unfinished 1971 film featuring readings from the book by Orson Welles. The footage was unedited in Welles' lifetime, but was posthumously compiled in 1999 by the Munich Film Museum.
- Moby Dick, featuring Jack Aranson as Captain Ahab, was filmed in 1978 and released in November 2005 on DVD. The director was Paul Stanley.
- The 1984 animated film Samson & Sally: Song of the Whales involves a young white whale named Samson who searches for Moby-Dick after hearing a legend that Moby-Dick would one day return to save all the whales. The sinking of the Pequod is shown as the young whale's mother tells him the story of Moby Dick. The film was alternately titled The Secret of Moby Dick in some other countries.
- The 1986 animated film Dot and the Whale involves the character Dot embarking on a search for Moby-Dick in hope of helping a beached whale.
- The 1994 live-action/animated hybrid fantasy film The Pagemaster features a scene with Moby Dick and Captain Ahab, who was voiced by George Hearn.
- The 1996 Canadian animated short film (42 mins) The Adventures of Moby Dick, has a young Moby Dick lose his mother off the coast of Massachusetts in 1841, before being befriended by Ishmael, an orphan boy working on the Pequod with Captain Ahab.
- In 1999, a 25-minute paint-on-glass-animated adaptation was made by the Russian studio Man and Time, directed by Natalya Orlova from a screenplay by Brian Sibley. Rod Steiger was the voice of Captain Ahab. The film came in third place at the 5th Open Russian Festival of Animated Film. It was later released on DVD as part of the "World Literary Classics" series.
- Capitaine Achab, a 2007 French film directed by Philippe Ramos, with Valérie Crunchant and Frédéric Bonpart. The film focuses on Ahab's early life, leading up to his encounter with Moby Dick.
- Moby Dick, a 2010 film starring Barry Bostwick as Ahab and made by The Asylum, released on DVD as 2010: Moby Dick.
- The 2011 film Age of the Dragons, directed by Ryan Little, features Danny Glover as a mountain-roaming Ahab maimed by fire instead of a peg-leg, in which the great white whale is a white dragon.
- The 2015 film In the Heart of the Sea, directed by Ron Howard, about the sinking of the American whaling ship Essex in 1820, an event that inspired Herman Melville's 1851 novel Moby-Dick.
- The 2018 sci-fi film Beyond White Space, directed by Ken Locsmandi, make strong references to the novel, characters mentioned and real people involved with the book and the process of publishing.

== Television ==
- In 1954, Albert McCleery made a television film entitled Moby Dick for the Hallmark Hall of Fame anthology series, starring Victor Jory as Captain Ahab, Lamont Johnson as Ishmael, Harvey Stephens as Stubb and Hugh O'Brian as Starbuck.
- "Dopey Dick the Pink Whale", a 1957 episode of Woody Woodpecker, was directed by Paul J. Smith. Woody is shanghaied onto the Peapod by Dapper Denver Dooley to go after the pink whale Dopey Dick that bit him (and keeps biting him) in the rear, and Woody conspires with the whale against the cowardly captain.
- In 1961, Rocky and His Friends featured the Wailing Whale story arc in which Rocky and Bullwinkle go in search of Maybe Dick, the Wailing Whale.
- "Dicky Moe", a 1962 episode of Tom and Jerry directed by Gene Deitch, has Tom shanghaied by the Ahab-like captain of the Komquot, whose crew has all deserted and who soon puts him to work scrubbing the deck. When Dicky Moe is finally sighted, the line from a fired harpoon which Tom is holding onto causes him to be lashed to the whale's side Ahab-fashion.
- A 1964 episode of The Famous Adventures of Mr. Magoo saw Ishmael Quincy Magoo as a member of Captain Ahab's crew hunting the great white whale.
- A 1964 episode of The Flintstones called "Adobe Dick" saw Fred Flintstone and the gang encounter the great "whaleasaurus" during a Lodge fishing trip. This episode also mixed in aspects of Mutiny on the Bounty by sailing on HMS Bountystone commanded by "Captain Blah".
- A 1964 episode of Voyage to the Bottom of the Sea called "The Ghost of Moby Dick" stars Edward Binns as a crippled insane marine biologist named Walter Bryce who is obsessed with finding the great White Whale that killed his son.
- In 1967, the Hanna-Barbera series Moby Dick and Mighty Mightor featured the whale in adventures with two boys he had rescued.
- A 1991 episode of the cartoon series Beetlejuice titled "Moby Richard" had Beetlejuice and Lydia putting on "Disasterpiece Theatre" and deciding to do Moby Dick as their first episode. But Moby "Richard" refuses to change the classic to suit Beetlejuice's notions of what a classic should be and quits – but not without insulting BJ first. BJ lets the character of Captain Ahab take him over, and leads the others on a dangerous mission through Sandworm Land to get revenge on the whale.
- The September 22, 1993 episode of The New Pink Panther Show aired a segment entitled "Moby Pink", in which the Pink Panther (voiced by Matt Frewer), after being unable to board a cruise ship for his vacation, winds up on a broken-down fishing scow, captained by an obsessed old peg-legged sailor searching for the "great off-white whale" known as "Skippy".
- The October 26, 1993 episode of Animaniacs aired a segment entitled "Moby or Not Moby", in which the Warner siblings (Yakko, Wakko and Dot) try to protect Moby Dick from the wrath of Captain Ahab. The Warners and Ahab perform a parody of the sea shanty "The Drunken Sailor" entitled "Captain Ahab, You're a Dummy".
- In a 1996 episode of The X-Files titled "Quagmire", FBI agents Fox Mulder and Dana Scully investigate a mythical lake monster named Big Blue, which resembles Loch Ness. The episode is a loose retelling of Moby-Dick. Big Blue is a representation of the paranormal and of Moby Dick, the infamous sperm whale. Mulder, who plays the part of Captain Ahab, is obsessed with finding Big Blue. Scully calls herself Starbuck. Throughout the episode, Scully's dog, named Queequeg, is Scully's companion. The dog Queequeg plays the part of the harpooner by following its nose towards the lake and ultimately towards Big Blue. Mulder and Scully venture out onto the lake in a boat in search of Big Blue. The boat is struck by an unidentified object and sinks, leaving Mulder and Scully seemingly stranded on a rock. Mulder's quest for Big Blue nearly kills the entire crew of the boat.
- A Japanese animated adaptation called Hakugei: Legend of the Moby Dick was produced in 1997. The anime is a sci-fi retelling of the book, with Moby Dick being a whale-shaped sentient spaceship with the power to destroy planets.
- Moby Dick, a 1998 television mini-series starring Patrick Stewart as Ahab. Gregory Peck won a Golden Globe for his portrayal of Father Mapple.
- Moby Dick et le Secret de Mu, a 2005 Luxembourgian/French animated series produced by Benoît Petit.
- Moby Dick, a 2011 television mini-series directed by Mike Barker, starring William Hurt as Ahab, Donald Sutherland as Father Mapple, and Ethan Hawke as Starbuck.
- In the Phineas and Ferb episode "Belly of the Beast" (April 29, 2011), the boys create a giant mechanical shark for the annual Danville Harbor celebrations. Candace and her friend Stacy join a peg-legged Ahab-like captain aboard his ship The Pea-quad in chasing the giant shark, hurling harpoons made of toilet plungers. When the captain is supposedly devoured by the shark, Candace assumes command and an Ahab-like personality, even paraphrasing Ahab's curse: "From Danville Harbor I stab at thee; for bustings' sake I spit my last spit at thee!". The rope attached to one of the plunger harpoons fired from the cannon gets looped around her ankle and she becomes lashed to the shark's side in Ahab-fashion.
- "Möbius Dick" is a sixth-season episode of the series Futurama that first aired on August 4, 2011. Leela becomes obsessed with hunting a four-dimensional space whale.
- "Ramlak Rising" is a first-season episode of the 2011 ThunderCats series that first aired on August 5, 2011. The captain of a ship obsessively hunts a creature called a Ramlak.
- The 2013 television film The Whale, written by Terry Cafolla.
- "Dopey Dick" is a thirteenth-season episode of the series SpongeBob SquarePants that first aired on June 29, 2023. Squidward acts as Fishmael, and he and the captain's crew of sailors join the hunt for a great white jellyfish named Dopey Dick.

== Video Games ==
- The 2015 video game Metal Gear Solid V: The Phantom Pain, directed by Hideo Kojima and published by Konami, makes extensive references to Moby-Dick and its characters. Early in the game, a character introduces himself by quoting the novel's opening line, "Who am I? You can call me Ishmael." before giving the player character the name "Ahab." After escaping from invading forces, the player character sees a huge flaming whale. Later in the game, a pilot named Pequod is assigned to the player's helicopter. In addition, the character Kazuhira Miller loses several limbs and is driven by revenge for the remainder of the plot, similar to Ahab in the novel.
- The 2023 video game Limbus Company has a character named Ishmael, whose backstory and "Canto" (i.e. story quest) directly reference Moby-Dick. The Pequod is a faction in the game, while the whale, in this context, is known as the Pallid Whale, a towering whale that roams The Great Lake, and is one of the Five Calamities. Captain Ahab, Queequeg, Starbuck, Stubb, and Pip are characters. In the context of Limbus Company, Captain Ahab shows hatred to the Pallid Whale due to it being the "Source of All Evil" rather than the loss of her leg, and journeys throughout The Great Lake to be the one who eventually slays the Pallid Whale. Eventually, Ishmael spares Captain Ahab's life despite initially wanting to kill her, and instead is the one who slays the Pallid Whale, rather than Ahab.

== Audio ==
- There are a number of unabridged audiobook recordings of the novel, including by Frank Muller (Recorded Books, 1987), William Hootkins (Naxos Audiobooks, 2005; an abridged recording by Hootkins was released by Penguin Audio, 2006) and Anthony Heald (Blackstone Audio, 2009).
- An abridged adaptation of the novel was broadcast on the July 14, 1946 episode of the NBC concert music radio show Harvest of Stars hosted by Raymond Massey, with Igor Gorin as the episode's featured singer.
- On August 30, 1946, Orson Welles and the Mercury Summer Theatre broadcast an adaptation starring Welles as Ahab based on an audio recording by Decca Records (DA-401) written by Bernard Duffield and starring Charles Laughton as Ahab.
- The novel was adapted on the NBC radio series World's Great Novels in four parts January 3-31, 1947.
- On February 4, 1947, NBC's Favorite Story, hosted by Ronald Colman, broadcast a half-hour adaptation starring Howard Duff as Ishmael, Frank Lovejoy as Starbuck and William Conrad as Ahab.
- The novel was adapted for radio as the first episode of the NBC radio series American Novels on July 4, 1947 with Everett Clark, Jess Pugh, Donald Gallagher, Curt Kupfer, Cliff Norton, Arthur Peterson, Bob Smith and Cliff Soubier.
- On October 19 and 26, 1947, Columbia Workshop broadcast a two-part adaptation starring Neil O'Mally, Sidney Smith, and Charles Irving.
- Henry Hull starred as Ahab in an adaptation broadcast on the NBC University Theatre on April 10, 1949.
- The March 6th 1949 CBC radio adaptation starred Lorne Greene as Captain Ahab.
- On November 8, 1953, NBC Star Playhouse broadcast a one-hour production starring Fredric March as Ahab and Nelson Olmsted as Ishmael.
- In 1965, Folkways Records released the LP Moby Dick - Selections read by Louis Zorich (FL 9775).
- In 1975, Caedmon Records released a two-LP recording of Excerpts from Moby Dick (TC-2077) with Charlton Heston as and reading chapters dealing with Captain Ahab including "The Chase", Keir Dullea as "Ishmael" reading the first two chapters "Loomings" and "The Carpetbag" and George Rose as "Father Mapple" reading "The Sermon". This recording was re-released on audio cassette in 1995 (CDL5-2077 and SWC 52077).
- On February 13, 1977, The General Mills Radio Adventure Theater, hosted by Tom Bosley, broadcast an adaptation of the novel produced and directed by Himan Brown, with Howard da Silva and Mason Adams.
- In 1992, Durkin Hayes Publishing released a two-cassette abridged recording of Moby Dick (DTAB 517) read by George Kennedy.
- In 1996, Dove Audio released a 4-cassette abridged recording of Moby Dick (81780) read by Burt Reynolds; this recording was re-released in 2001 by New Millennium Audio.
- The 2006 BBC Radio 4 3-episode Classic Serial adaptation stars F. Murray Abraham as Ishmael and Fritz Weaver as Captain Ahab.
- In October 2010, BBC Radio 4's Classic Serial broadcast a new two-part adaptation of the novel by Stef Penney, produced and directed by Kate McAll with specially composed music by Stuart Gordon and starring Garrick Hagon as Ahab, Trevor White as the narrating Ishmael, PJ Brennan as the young Ishmael of the story, Richard Laing as Starbuck and Sani Muliaumaseali'i as Queequeg.
- In December 2019, a two-part adaptation of the novel by Phil Hall was produced for the syndicated radio theatre series Nutmeg Junction and premiered on WAPJ-FM in Torrington, Connecticut.

== Stage and music ==
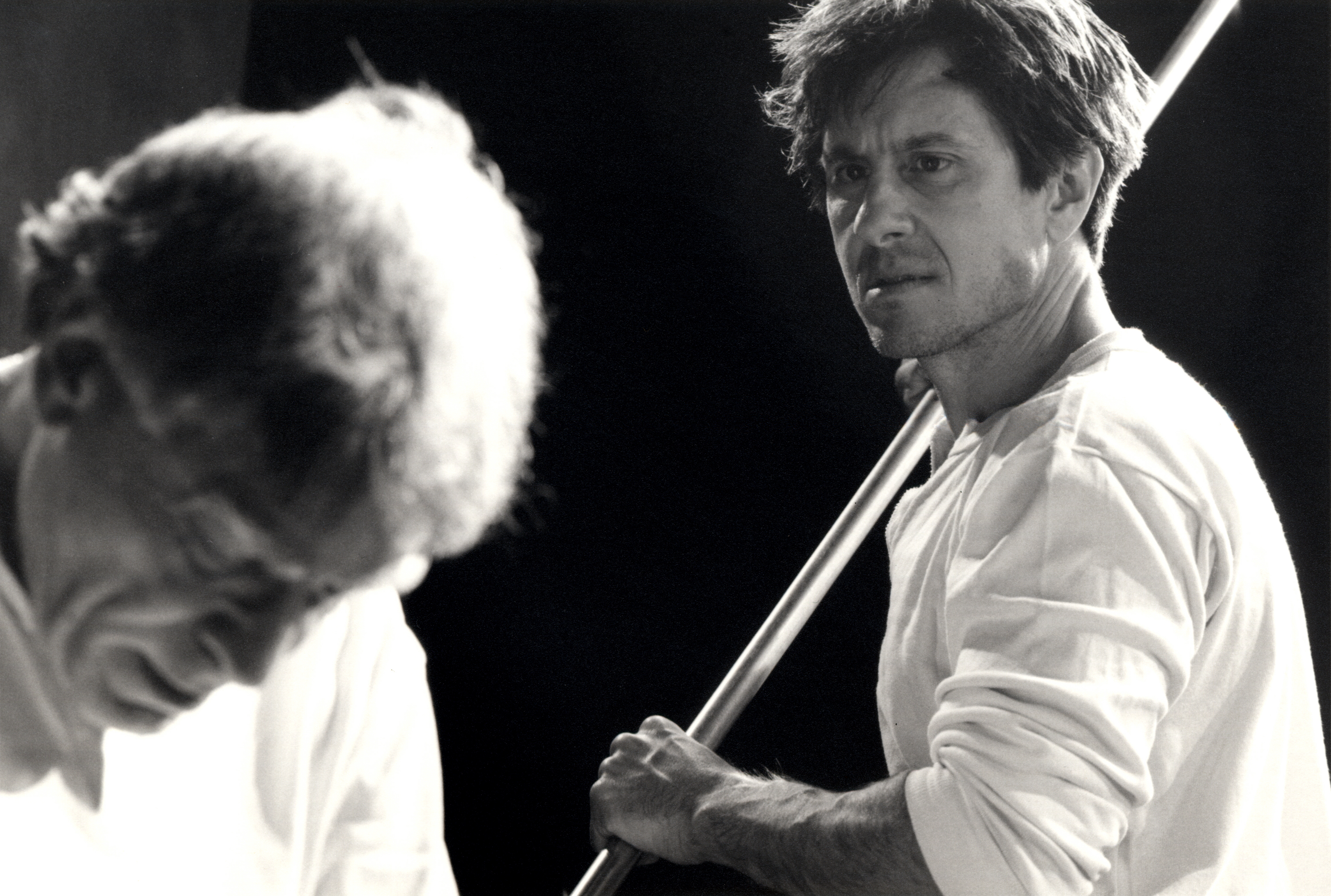
Featured: Martin Epstein as Ahab and Michael Berry as Starbuck in Works Productions' Moby Dick.

- Moby Dick, a cantata for male soloists, chorus and orchestra, written in 1938 by the composer Bernard Herrmann, and dedicated to Charles Ives. Sir John Barbirolli conducted the New York Philharmonic in its premiere.
- Peter Mennin composed "Concertato for Orchestra, 'Moby Dick'", an orchestral work commissioned by the Erie Philharmonic Orchestra and first performed by them on October 20, 1952.
- Moby Dick—Rehearsed, a "play within a play" written and directed by Orson Welles. Welles starred in the original London production in 1955, while Rod Steiger starred in the original Broadway production in 1962.
- Led Zeppelin's eighth track from the 1969 Led Zeppelin II album was also known by other names throughout the years ("Pat's Delight" and "Over the Top") but is best known as "Moby Dick".
- "Queequeg and I – The Water Is Wide" is a composition included on the 1987 album Whales Alive, a collaboration between Paul Winter and Paul Halley.
- Moby Dick! The Musical, a West End musical that premiered in 1990 about a girls' boarding-school production of the classic tale.
- W. Francis McBeth composed a five-movement suite for wind band named Of Sailors and Whales that is based on scenes from the book Moby-Dick. It was published in 1990.
- In 1991, the Idaho Theater for Youth commissioned an adaptation written by Mark Rosenwinkel. The premiere production was directed by David Lee-Painter. The adaptation ran at the University of Idaho in April 2016. The production was directed by Shea King.
- In 1999, performance artist Laurie Anderson produced the multimedia stage presentation Songs and Stories From Moby Dick. Several songs from this project were included on her 2001 in music CD Life on a String.
- In 2000, Jim Burke's adaptation of Moby Dick toured the UK aboard Walk the Plank's theatre ship, the Fitzcarraldo, in a co-production with Liverpool company Kaboodle. It won Best New Play and Best Fringe Production in the Manchester Evening News Theatre Awards.
- Writer Julian Rad and director Hilary Adams created a bare-stage adaptation of Moby Dick that premiered in New York City in 2003. The Off-Off Broadway "play with music" was nominated for three 2004 Drama Desk Awards: Outstanding Play (Julian Rad, writer/Works Productions, producer), Outstanding Director of a Play (Hilary Adams) and Outstanding Featured Actor in a Play (Michael Berry as Starbuck).
- Composer Peter Westergaard has composed Moby Dick: Scenes From an Imaginary Opera, an operatic work for five soloists, chorus and chamber orchestra. The work was premiered in October 2004 in Princeton, New Jersey. Its libretto draws on the parts of the novel that deal with Ahab's obsession with the whale.
- Progressive metal band Mastodon released Leviathan in 2004. The album is loosely based on Moby-Dick.
- Funeral doom metal group Ahab, founded in 2004, take their band's name after the captain of the Pequod and draw many of their lyrics from events of Moby-Dick. Their debut album The Call of the Wretched Sea is a retelling of the story of the book.
- The 2005 Demons & Wizards song "Beneath These Waves" is based on Moby-Dick.
- MC Lars' 2006 album The Graduate contains the track "Ahab", in which Lars raps the story of Moby-Dick.
- In 2008, a production of Moby Dick was commissioned by and performed at the Stratford Shakespeare Festival of Canada. The adaptation was written and directed by Morris Panych and was unique, among other things, for being performed on a revolving stage, for stage movement that was more like ballet, and for having no dialogue actually spoken by the cast (all narration/speech was pre-recorded and played over the action). The production was performed at the Studio Theater from July 22 to October 18, 2008, and starred David Ferry as Captain Ahab, Shaun Smyth as Ishmael, Eddie Glen as Flask, Marcus Nance as Queequeg and Kelly Grainger, Alison Jantzie, and Lynda Sing as The Sirens/Whale.
- Composer Jake Heggie and librettist Gene Scheer wrote the opera Moby-Dick for the Dallas Opera's inaugural season in the Winspear Opera House. It premiered on April 30, 2010, with Ben Heppner as Captain Ahab. The opera has since been mounted by the State Opera of South Australia (August 2011), Calgary Opera (January 2012), San Diego Opera (February 2012), San Francisco Opera (October 2012), Washington National Opera (February/March 2014), Los Angeles Opera (November 2015) and Metropolitan Opera (March 2025).
- In 2010, the band Glass Wave recorded a song entitled "Moby Dick". The song recounts the story from the perspective of the mariners and of the whale itself after the decimation of the ship.
- In 2012, Rindle Eckert created And God Created Whales, an opera that follows an amnesiac who discovers that he had been working on an operatic adaptation of Moby-Dick. The show includes segments from this fictional opera played through a recording device. The production featured a simple set and a two-person cast.
- David Catlin directed and adapted a musical based on the book. It played at the Arena Stage in Chicago during November and December 2016.
- In 2019, Dave Malloy, a composer and writer who adapted Beowulf (Beowulf – A Thousand Years of Baggage) and War and Peace (Natasha, Pierre & The Great Comet of 1812) premiered his musical adaptation titled Moby-Dick. It premiered at the American Repertory Theater on December 11, 2019, directed by Rachel Chavkin.
- In 2022, artist Caleb Hayashida released the concept album Moby Dick or The Whale, in which the songs are from the perspectives of various characters in Moby-Dick.
- In 2025, Marco Bernard, bass player of the band The Samurai of Prog, released an album titled Moby Dick, a progressive rock concept album that goes beyond the story of one man's obsession. It uses the hunt for the elusive white whale as a symbol of our own relentless pursuit of personal gain and success—often at the expense of what really matters: community, empathy, and emotional rebirth.

== Literature ==
=== Comics and graphic novels ===
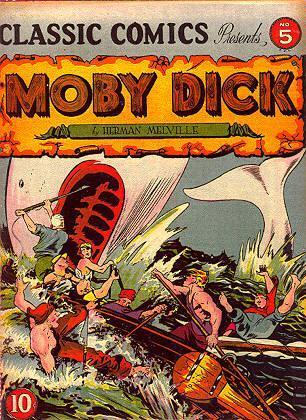
Adaptation from Classic Comics #5

Cover of Classics Illustrated graphic novel done by Bill Sienkiewicz

- In 1946, Gilberton Publications adapted the story in Classic Comics #5.
- In 1956, Dell Comics adapted the story in Four Color #717.
- The DC Comics story Adventure Comics #332 (1965) is titled "The Super-Moby Dick of Space" and features Lightning Lad in a role analogous to that of Captain Ahab as he battles a whale-like creature who was accidentally grown to gigantic size by a scientist. Lightning Lad loses his right arm to the creature and utilizes a prosthetic until his arm is regenerated.
- In 1965, the Mexican company Ediciones Joma published a 27 issue run of Moby Dick featuring the character battling various monsters.
- In 1976, Marvel Comics adapted the story in Marvel Classics Comics #8.
- In 1977, King Features adapted the story in King Classics #3.
- In 1990, Classics Illustrated adapted the story into a graphic novel by artist Bill Sienkiewicz and writer D. G. Chichester.
- Also in 1990, Pendulum Press adapted the story in issue #1 of Pendulum's Illustrated Stories.
- In 1998, Will Eisner published a graphic novel adaptation.
- 2000 AD's series A.H.A.B. borrows the storyline and the names of several characters from Moby-Dick.
- In 2001, the city of New Bedford published a comic adaptation to mark the novel's 150th anniversary, written by Lew Sayre Schwartz with illustrations by Dick Giordano.
- In 2008, Marvel Comics released Marvel Illustrated: Moby-Dick, a six-issue adaptation.
- In 2011, Tin House Books released Matt Kish's Moby Dick in Pictures: One Drawing for Every Page, an illustrated edition featuring one drawing for every page of the 552-page Signet Classics paperback edition.
- In 2017, Dark Horse published the two-part 2014 Vents d'Ouest hardcover graphic novel by Christophe Chaboute in English.

=== Novels ===
- The novel Involution Ocean by Bruce Sterling, published in 1977, features the world Nullaqua where all the atmosphere is contained in a single, miles-deep crater. The story concerns a ship sailing on the ocean of dust at the bottom, which hunts creatures called dustwhales that live beneath the surface. It is a science-fictional pastiche of Moby-Dick.
- Philip José Farmer wrote a sequel called The Wind Whales of Ishmael, in which Ishmael is transported to the far-future where flying whales are hunted from aircraft.
- In 1999, Sena Jeter Naslund published Ahab's Wife or, The Star-Gazer based on a few brief mentions of Captain Ahab's wife in Moby-Dick. Ahab's Wife received wide critical acclaim, including a New York Time's Notable Book of the Year and a place on Time Magazine's List of Best Books of 1999, and was a finalist for the Women's Prize for Fiction. The book was adapted for audio in an abridged format by Simon & Schuster Audio and narrated by Maryann Plunkett.
- China Miéville's 2012 novel Railsea, set on an ocean of railroad tracks instead of on the sea, has been described as an "affectionate parody" of Moby-Dick.
- Jeffrey Ford's 2018 novel Ahab’s Return: or, The Last Voyage posits that Ahab survived the sinking of the Pequod, which was heavily mythologized by Ishmael (who wrote the book we know as Moby-Dick).
- Howard A. Rodman's 2019 novel The Great Eastern is about the inevitable collison between Captain Ahab and Jules Verne's Captain Nemo: "One who lives beneath the waves and hates everything upon them, one who lives upon the waves and hates everything beneath."

=== Children's literature ===
- Mighty Moby by author Barbara DaCosta, illustrated by Ed Young, 2017, retells the story in prose, song, and collage art, with an added child-oriented twist at the end. The book was also made into an animated video by DreamWorks.
- Moby Dick: Chasing the Great White Whale, 2012. The complete Moby Dick story adapted into verse by Eric Kimmel, fully illustrated by Andrew Glass.
- In the Little Bill book Shipwreck Saturday, Little Bill named his own boat Moby Dick after the story.

== Other ==
- Speed-talking actor John Moschitta, Jr., as part of his audio tape, Ten Classics in Ten Minutes, read a rapid-fire one-minute summary of the lengthy novel, concluding with the line: "And everybody dies... but the fish... and Ish."
- On the 13 February 1947 episode of The Abbott and Costello Show, "Costello Buys A Boat", Lou Costello tried to tell his version of Moby Dick as his "bedtime story" despite getting constantly interrupted by Bud Abbott (and this version of the story having almost nothing to do with the Melville novel).
- In 1958, Decca Records released Burl Ives's album Capt. Burl Ives' Ark (DL 8587). One of the tracks on Side B was "Old Moby Dick", detailing all the things that could be made out of the giant whale.
- The 1965 film The Bedford Incident references Moby Dick many times in particular Eric Finlander's Captain Ahab-like obsession with hunting his prey (a Soviet Submarine).
- On 5 June 1966, the BBC radio series Round the Horne broadcast a parody of the story entitled Moby Duck ("the great white Peking Duck ... eighty foot long it be with a two hundred foot wingspan and they do say as how when it lays an egg in the China Seas there be tidal waves at Scarborough!") starring Kenneth Horne as the Ishmael-like hero "Ebenezer Cuckpowder" (Kenneth Williams: "This fine stripling with his apple cheeks and his long blond hair, aye and his ... cor', you don't half have to use your imagination!") who is shanghaied in Portsmouth aboard Captain Ahab's ship The Golden Help-Glub-Glub ("the woman who was launching it fell off the rostrum and drowned!"). Kenneth Williams played "Captain Ahab", who after the great duck is sighted has himself stuffed into the harpoon gun and fired at his prey (Betty Marsden: "Oh, congratulations! A direct hit!" Kenneth Horne: "Where?" Betty: "Well, I can't actually say, but if Captain Ahab was an orange ..."). At the end of the story, Kenneth Horne stated that "Hugh Paddick played the part of the duck ... it was the part that most people throw away."
- In 1973, a simplified version of the novel by Robert James Dixson was published by Regents Pub. Co.
- The visionary architect Douglas Darden was greatly inspired by Herman Melville, and circa 1990 designed a work of paper architecture called Melvilla that is meant to be a structural celebration of what Darden regarded as America's greatest novel. The building is sited on the lot in Manhattan where Melville worked on Moby-Dick, utilizes a passage from the novel as a building inscription, and apart from the overall design looking like a whale, the building's design was inspired by ideas, turns of phrase, structures, and passages from the novel. Additionally, Darden utilizes a passage from Chapter 78 on the title image of his only published book Condemned Building.
- The Steven Spielberg film Jaws (film) features a captain obsessively hunting a white shark; who ultimately dies in a similar manner to Ahab.
- The music video for the song "Into the Ocean" by the band Blue October depicts an outdoor theater in which the band plays acts out a rendition of Moby-Dick, in which the lead singer, Justin Furstenfeld, plays the part of Captain Ahab.
- The novella Leviathan '99 by Ray Bradbury is an adaptation of Moby-Dick set in the year 2099. The whale is replaced by a comet, the sailing ship by a spaceship, and the character names are either the same or nearly the same. On 18 May 1968, BBC Radio 3 broadcast an adaptation of the story starring Christopher Lee as The Captain, Denys Hawthorne as Ishmael, Robert Eddison as Quell and Walter Fitzgerald as The Warning Man. A concert version, Leviathan '99: A Drama for the Stage, was performed in 1972.
- "Obsession" is the thirteenth episode of the second season of the series Star Trek. Captain Kirk becomes obsessed with killing a deadly cloud-like entity.
- In Star Trek II: The Wrath of Khan (1982), Khan Noonien Singh's obsession with revenge against the now Admiral Kirk parallels Ahab's obsession with Moby-Dick. Khan directly quotes Ahab as he dies, saying "From hell's heart, I stab at thee. For hate's sake, I spit my last breath at thee."
- The 2001 short story "The Slayers" by David Lee Summers is a retelling of Moby Dick where an airship crew hunts dragons.
- Emoji Dick, released in 2013, features the entire novel "translated" into emojis.
- There are at least two card games based on the novel: Moby Dick, or the Card Game (released in 2013) and Dick: A Card Game Based on the Novel by Herman Melville (released in 2015).
- On 9 January 2018, a Horror Webcomic sequel started by Matt Schorr, entitled Moby Dick: Back From The Deep, featuring the titular white whale as a giant zombified monster that reappears in modern times.
- Ishmael, a character based on the character Ishmael of Moby Dick in the 2023 indie horror RPG and turn-based video game Limbus Company created by South Korean studio Project Moon. She is one of the twelve playable characters. The fifth chapter of the game (Canto V: The Evil Defining) focuses on Ishmael as a character and features the characters Ahab, Starbuck, Queequeg, Pip and Stubb, who are also based on the respective characters in Moby Dick.
