= Moby Dick (disambiguation) =

Moby-Dick is an 1851 novel by Herman Melville.

Moby Dick may also refer to:

- Moby Dick (whale), the white whale in the novel

== Films ==
- Moby Dick (1930 film), a film starring John Barrymore
- Moby Dick (1956 film), a film by John Huston starring Gregory Peck
- Moby Dick (unfinished film), an unfinished 1971 film by Orson Welles
- Moby Dick (1978 film), a one-man version
- Moby Dick (2010 film), a modern-day military version
- Moby Dick (2011 film), a South Korean film directed by Park In-je

== Television ==
- Moby Dick (Hallmark Hall of Fame), an episode of the TV series Hallmark Hall of Fame
- Moby Dick (1998 miniseries), a miniseries starring Patrick Stewart and Gregory Peck
- Moby Dick (2011 miniseries), a miniseries by Mike Barker, starring William Hurt and Ethan Hawke
- Moby Dick and Mighty Mightor, a 1960s Hanna-Barbera cartoon
- "Moby Dick", an episode of 3rd Rock from the Sun

== Other arts and entertainment ==
- Moby Dick (cantata), a 1938 cantata by Bernard Herrmann
- "Moby Dick" (instrumental), an instrumental tune and drum solo by Led Zeppelin
- Moby Dick (musical), a 1992 musical
- Moby-Dick (2019 musical), a 2019 musical
- Moby Dick (band), a pop-dance band formed in 1990
- Moby-Dick (opera), a 2010 opera by Jake Heggie

== Animals ==
- Moby Dick (Rhine), a beluga or white whale
- Voeltzkowia mobydick, a species of lizard

== People ==
- Mobydick, a Moroccan rapper and record producer, born 1978

== Other uses ==
- Moby Dick (Alaska), a mountain in Alaska
- Moby Dick Mountain, a summit in British Columbia
- Moby Dick (restaurant), a Persian restaurant chain in Washington
- Porsche 935/78 or Moby Dick, a car model

== See also ==
- Adaptations of Moby-Dick
- Mo B. Dick, music producer and rapper
- Moby Dick—Rehearsed, a 1955 play by Orson Welles
- Moby Duck (disambiguation)
