= Moby (disambiguation) =

Moby (born 1965) is an American electronic musician and DJ.

Moby or MOBY may refer to:

== Software ==
- Moby (software)

== People ==
- Moby Benedict (born 1935), American baseball player and University of Michigan head coach

== Arts, entertainment and media ==
- Moby (album), the musician's 1992 debut album
- Moby, a bird enemy in Zelda 2: The Adventure of Link
- Moby the Robot, a character on the educational website BrainPop

== Organisations ==
- Moby Media Group, the largest media company in Afghanistan
- Moby Lines, an Italian shipping company
- Moby Project, a collection of public-domain lexical resources

== Other uses ==
- Moby Arena, a basketball arena in Fort Collins, Colorado
- Marine Optical Buoy (MOBY), part of an ocean color observation system

== See also ==
- Mobi (disambiguation)
- Moby Dick (disambiguation)
