= Music for the Movies: Bernard Herrmann =

1992 film

- Film poster
- Directed by: Joshua Waletzky
- Produced by: Judy Aley; Roma Baran; Richard Copans; Yves Jeanneau; Christine Le Goff; Margaret Smilov
- Narrated by: Philip Bosco
- Cinematography: Henryk Cymerman
- Edited by: Joshua Waletzky
- Production companies: Alternate Current; Les Films d'Ici; La Sept
- Release date: 1992
- Countries: United States; France
- Languages: English; French

Music for the Movies: Bernard Herrmann is a 1992 documentary film directed by Joshua Waletzky. It was nominated for an Academy Award for Best Documentary Feature.

== Cast ==
- Elmer Bernstein - Himself
- Claudine Bouché - Herself
- Royal S. Brown - Himself
- Claude Chabrol - Himself
- Norman Corwin - Himself
- Don Cristlieb - Himself
- Lucille Fletcher - Herself
- Bernard Herrmann - Himself
- Paul Hirsch - Himself
- Louis Kaufman - Himself
- Virginia Majewski - Herself
- Christopher Palmer - Himself
- David Raksin - Himself
- Alan Robinson - Himself
- Martin Scorsese - Himself
- James G. Stewart - Himself
