= Mobi =

Mobi or MOBI may refer to:

== Companies ==
- Mobi (company), an American wireless provider

== Computing ==
- .mobi, internet top domain name
- .mobi, a file extension of the deprecated Mobipocket e-book format

== People ==
- Mobi Fehr (born 1994), American soccer player
- Mobi Okoli (born 1987), Nigerian football player
- Mobi Oparaku (born 1976), Nigerian former football player

== Other uses ==
- Mobi (bike share), a Canadian bicycle-sharing system
- Fiat Mobi, a 2016–present Brazilian-Italian city car

== See also ==
- Moby (disambiguation)
