= Symphony No. 1 (Herrmann) =

Symphony by Bernard Herrmann

Symphony No. 1 is a four-movement orchestral composition by American composer Bernard Herrmann. The work was jointly commissioned in 1940 by CBS and the New York Philharmonic and was completed March 29, 1941, though Herrmann revised the work in 1973. It premiered July 27, 1941, at the CBS Radio Theater, with Herrmann conducting the CBS Symphony Orchestra. Though he would continue to compose concert music and film scores throughout his later life, the symphony would be Herrmann's last foray into nonprogrammatic music.

== Style and composition ==
The symphony has a duration of roughly 35 minutes and is composed in four movements:

1. Maestoso: Allegro pesante
2. Scherzo
3. Andante sostenuto
4. Rondo: Epilogue à la processional

On the experience of composing absolute music, Herrmann said, "For the first time I was not confined to the outline of a story. It was not necessary to depict waves, portray the anguish of a lost soul, or look for a love theme... Consequently, working on the Symphony I had a Roman holiday." Albert Imperato of Gramophone compared the music favorably with that of other 20th century composers Samuel Barber, William Walton, and William Schuman.

== Reception ==
Initial critical response to the symphony was favorable, though the work has fallen into relative obscurity since its premiere. In 2011, Brian Gittis of The Paris Review called the work "an underappreciated symphony." Gramophone's Albert Imperato also argued for a reassessment of the piece, calling it "more than a curiosity." Herrmann biographer Steven C. Smith further commented:

After the innovations of Kane and All That Money Can Buy and the orchestral originality of Moby Dick, Herrmann's Symphony seems in some ways a step back, a retreat to concert Neo-Romanticism. [...] Although Herrmann apparently enjoyed the process of its composition, the Symphony illustrates Herrmann's uneasiness working in a rigidly formal structure. It also suffers from the fragmentation that characterizes most of Herrmann's output, a quality ideal for radio and film but not for the concert hall. Yet the Symphony was an impressive achievement for the thirty-year-old Herrmann: a mature, brilliantly orchestrated work whose power increases on subsequent listenings. Its traditional idiom makes it the most accessible of Herrmann's concert works and the most likely candidate for rediscovery (especially in its 1973 revised form).

== Discography ==
- 1974: Bernard Herrmann – Symphony, performed by the National Philharmonic Orchestra, Bernard Herrmann (dir.) - Unicorn Records (reissued 1993 on CD).
- 1993: Herrmann: Symphony; Schuman: New England Triptych, performed by the Phoenix Symphony, James Sedares (dir.) - Koch Records.

== Sources ==
- Smith, Steven C. (1991). A Heart at Fire's Center: The Life and Music of Bernard Herrmann. University of California Press; First Edition, With a New Preface edition (May 31, 2002). ISBN 0520927230.
