= Moby Dick - Rehearsed (Wednesday Theatre) =

- Wednesday Theatre episode
- Episode no.: Season 1 Episode 20
- Directed by: Ken Hannam
- Based on: Moby Dick Rehearsed by Orson Welles
- Original air date: 19 May 1965
- Running time: 65 mins

Episode chronology
← Previous "Cinderella"	Next → "Replaced"

"Moby Dick - Rehearsed" is a 1965 Australian TV play based on the 1955 play Moby Dick - Rehearsed by Orson Welles. It was shot in Sydney.

== Plot ==
A stage is set for a performance of King Lear. However the actor-manager has something else in mind - for his cast to do a rehearsed reading of Moby Dick.

== Cast ==
- Wynn Roberts as Ahab
- Keith Alexander as Starbuck
- Ed Devereaux as Stubb
- Des Rolfe as Flask
- Michael Thomas as young actor, also Ishmael
- Patricia Connolly as Pip
- Stewart Ginn as Middle Aged Axtor / Elijah and Carpenter
- Tom Farley
- David Copping
- Alex Cann
- Tommy Dysart
- Guy Le Claire

== Production ==
The set was designed by Geoffrey Wedlock.

== Reception ==
The TV critic for the Sydney Morning Herald called it "very exciting television... Ken Hannam's production was compelling and always visually interesting, especially in the use of focus."

The Canberra Times called it "a fine actors play, but, let us face it, a pretty boring one" but praised the work of Wynn Roberts and Patricia Connolly.
