= Jack Aranson =

American actor (1924–2008)

- Born: Jack Aranson; December 29, 1924; Los Angeles, California
- Died: January 3, 2008 (aged 83); Sleepy Hollow, New York
- Education: Old Vic Theatre School
- Occupation: actor-manager

Jack Aranson (29 December 1924 – 3 January 2008) was an American actor, trained in Ireland and England, noted for acting in many Shakespeare plays and several one-man shows. He was one of the last actor-managers, creating and managing several small companies in California and New York. Jack played 13 characters in his one-man version of Moby Dick. Time called his performance one of the great (5) one-man shows of all time. This performance was filmed live by producer John Robert, directed by well-known director Paul Stanley. It is the highest ranked movie version of Moby Dick in IMDb.

== Career ==
Born in Los Angeles, California, Aranson began his professional career in England by serving a two-year apprenticeship at the Old Vic Theatre School.. He later toured Ireland in many Shakespearean roles in a different play every night. He starred in Murder in Eden (film), made at Ardmore Studios, in 1961. Aranson went to New York City to play in Moby Dick as Captain Ahab and in King Lear with Orson Welles. He was director of Shakespeare at the American Academy of Dramatic Arts. In 1976, he guest-starred in two episodes of the American television series Gibbsville. He died in Sleepy Hollow, New York, five days after his 83rd birthday.

== Quotations ==
To devise a version of Moby-Dick as a one-man theatre piece comes under the heading of 'They said it couldn't be done.' Jack Aranson has done it superbly.

— TIME magazine

As Ahab, Mr Aranson takes on stature. He reaches up to confront the stars. His chest expands. His voice is a trumpet, roaring over the sound of the sea. His eyes glitter with frenzy. It is a brilliant performance.

— Elloit Norton, Boston Herald American
