= Moby Duck =

Moby Duck may refer to:

- Moby Duck (Disney), a Disney cartoon character
- Moby Duck (film), a 1965 Warner Bros. animated film short
- The Seafair Pirates' ship
- Moby-Duck: The True Story of 28,800 Bath Toys Lost at Sea and of the Beachcombers, Oceanographers, Environmentalists, and Fools, Including the Author, Who Went in Search of Them, a 2011 book by Donovan Hohn
