= Robert James Dixson =

Robert James Dixson (May 23, 1908 – February 1, 1963) was an American writer who simplified and adapted some classic works of literature, that were later published in their new version,^{[a]} and wrote a number of books about the English language, especially crafted for the foreign born.^{[b]}

He lived in New York City and moved to Florida in the early 1950s. He died while living in Coral Gables in 1963.

He authored English language books by himself but also collaborated with others. Many of these books have been used throughout the world by those who wanted to learn or improve their knowledge of grammar, usage and pronunciation, particularly American English. Although the original editions served the intended purpose of his books, several have been re-published in different countries, most with translated notations to facilitate comprehension.^{[c]}

== Works ==
^{a} "Ten carefully graded readers American Classics, simplified and adapted"

1. The House of the Seven Gables (vocabulary range 750 words)
2. Moby Dick (vocabulary range 1000 words)
3. Murders in the Rue Morgue, and The Gold Bug (vocabulary range 1200 words)
4. The Pathfinder, or The Inland Sea (vocabulary range 1400 words)
5. The Outcasts of Poker Flat (vocabulary range 1600 words)
6. The Hoosier Schoolmaster (vocabulary range 1800 words)
7. The Portrait of a Lady (vocabulary range 2000 words)
8. The Rise of Silas Lapham (vocabulary range 2200 words)
9. Adventures of Huckleberry Finn (vocabulary range 2400 words)
10. The Red Badge of Courage (vocabulary range 2600 words)

^{b} English books (partial list)

- (1945) Exercises in English Conversation for the Foreign Born
- (1949) Tests and Drills in English Grammar for Foreign Students
- (1950) Modern Short Stories by American Authors
- (1951) Essential Idioms in English for the Foreign Born
- (1951) Complete Course in English
- (1953) Everyday Dialogues in English for the Foreign Born
- (1955) Curso Completo de Inglés (Spanish)
- (1957) Practice Exercises in Everyday English
- (1962) Modern American English

== Trivia ==
Some of Dixson's work was compiled into an English course with books and cassettes, titled "Modern American English," marketed by Grolier in the late 1960s. The main speaker on the course was Leslie Daniel (1919-2011), actor and voice-over performer, best known for his role as Kurt, the lab assistant in The Brain That Wouldn't Die.

Though some of his books on the English language are known as the "Dixson's English Series," they are more often listed on the Internet as "Dixon's English Series."
