= Bernard Herrmann =

American composer (1911–1975)

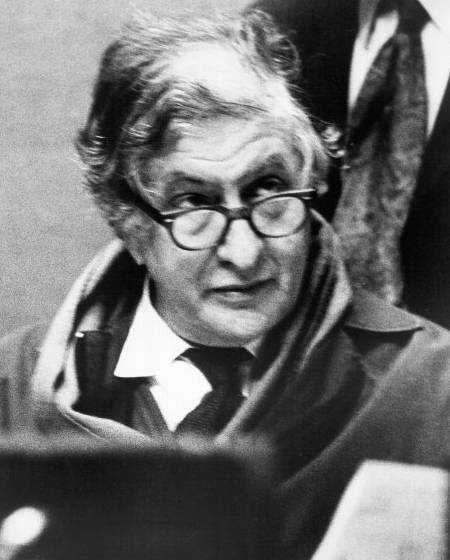
- Herrmann in 1970
- Born: Maximillian Herman; June 29, 1911; New York City, U.S.
- Died: December 24, 1975 (aged 64); Los Angeles, California, U.S.
- Resting place: Beth David Cemetery
- Other name: Bernard Maximillian Herrmann
- Education: Juilliard School; New York University
- Occupations: Composer; conductor
- Years active: 1934–1975
- Known for: Golden Age Film Composer
- Spouses: Lucille Fletcher (m. 1939; div. 1948) Lucy Anderson (m. 1949; div. 1964) Norma Shepherd (m. 1967)
- Children: 2
- Awards: 1941 Academy Award for Music Score of a Dramatic Picture, The Devil and Daniel Webster a.k.a. All That Money Can Buy; 1976 BAFTA Award for Best Film Music, Taxi Driver
- Website: thebernardherrmannestate.com

Bernard Herrmann (born Maximillian Herman; June 29, 1911 – December 24, 1975) was an American composer and conductor best known for his work in film scoring. He is widely regarded as one of the greatest film composers of all time. Alex Ross writes that "Over four decades, he revolutionized movie scoring by abandoning the illustrative musical techniques that dominated Hollywood in the 1930s and imposing his own peculiar harmonic and rhythmic vocabulary." As a conductor, he championed the music of lesser-known composers.

As a young man, Herrmann was the chief conductor of the CBS Symphony Orchestra, which led him to become the composer for Orson Welles's radio series The Mercury Theatre on the Air. This led him to write his first film score, for Welles's directorial debut Citizen Kane (1941). That year, he won the Academy Award for Best Original Score for The Devil and Daniel Webster. He worked with Welles on The Magnificent Ambersons (1942) and Jane Eyre (1943). He worked with Alfred Hitchcock on nine films, including The Man Who Knew Too Much (1956, where he makes a cameo appearance at the Royal Albert Hall), Vertigo (1958), North by Northwest (1959), Psycho (1960), The Birds (1963, as "sound consultant") and Marnie (1964).

His other credits include Anna and the King of Siam (1946), The Ghost and Mrs. Muir (1947), The Day the Earth Stood Still (1951), Cape Fear (1962), Fahrenheit 451 (1966) and Twisted Nerve (1968). He composed the scores for several fantasy films featuring the work of animator Ray Harryhausen and composed for television, including Have Gun – Will Travel and Rod Serling's The Twilight Zone. Towards the end of his career, Herrmann scored the Hitchcock-inspired films François Truffaut's The Bride Wore Black (1968) and Brian De Palma's Sisters (1972) and Obsession (1976). His final score, recorded shortly before his death, was for Martin Scorsese's Taxi Driver (1976). His career is chronicled in Music for the Movies: Bernard Herrmann (1992).

== Early life and education ==
Herrmann was born on June 29, 1911, in New York City as Maximillian Herman, the son of a Jewish middle-class family of Russian origin. He was the son of Ida (née Gorenstein) and Abram Dardik, who was from Ukraine and had changed the family name. Herrmann attended DeWitt Clinton High School, an all-boys public school in New York. His father encouraged music activity, taking him to the opera, and encouraging him to learn the violin. At thirteen he discovered Hector Berlioz's Treatise on Instrumentation, which was an important influence. After winning a composition prize, he decided to concentrate on music, and went to New York University, where he studied with Percy Grainger and Philip James. He later studied at the Juilliard School and, at the age of 20, formed the New Chamber Orchestra of New York. He befriended composers Aaron Copland and George Gershwin.

== Career ==
Herrmann was hired as an assistant to Johnny Green, host of Music in the Modern Manner. He composed incidental music for Keats's "La Belle Dame sans Merci". He conducted rehearsals of musicians, including Benny Goodman. Within two years, he was appointed music director of the Columbia Workshop, an experimental radio drama series for which Herrmann composed or arranged music (one notable program was The Fall of the City). Within nine years, he had become chief conductor to the CBS Symphony Orchestra. He was responsible for introducing more new works to US audiences than any other conductor – he was a particular champion of Charles Ives, who was virtually unknown at that time. Herrmann's radio programs of concert music, which were broadcast under such titles as Invitation to Music and Exploring Music, were planned in an unconventional way and featured rarely heard music, old and new, which was not heard in public concert halls. Examples include Music of Famous Amateurs, including such royals as Frederick the Great, Henry VIII, Charles I of England, Louis XIII and writers like John Milton, Samuel Pepys and Friedrich Nietzsche.

Herrmann's many US broadcast premieres during the 1940s included Nikolai Myaskovsky's 22nd Symphony, Gian Francesco Malipiero's 3rd Symphony, Richard Arnell's 1st Symphony, Edmund Rubbra's 3rd Symphony and Ives's 3rd Symphony. He performed the works of Hermann Goetz, Alexander Gretchaninov, Niels Gade and Franz Liszt and received many outstanding American musical awards and grants for his unusual programming and championship of little-known composers. In Dictators of the Baton, David Ewen wrote that Herrmann was "one of the most invigorating influences in the radio music of the past decade." Herrmann's own concert music was taken up and played by such celebrated maestri as Leopold Stokowski, Sir John Barbirolli, Sir Thomas Beecham and Eugene Ormandy. Barbirolli conducted the premiere of Herrmann's cantata Moby Dick, dedicated to Ives. He scored The March of Time, Lights Out and a radio adaptation of Aldous Huxley's Brave New World.

=== Collaborations with Orson Welles ===
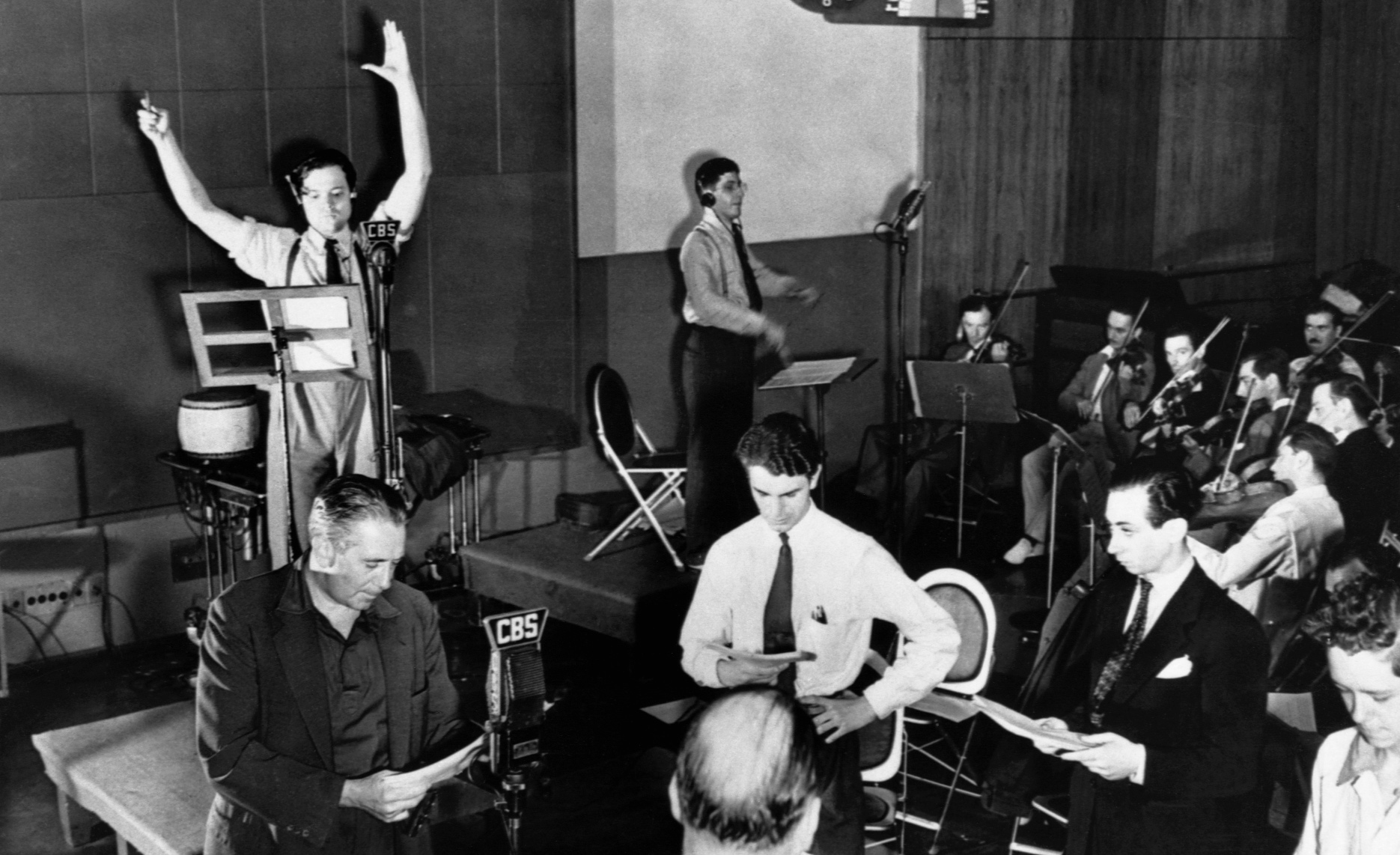
Herrmann conducts the CBS Radio orchestra at a rehearsal of The Mercury Theatre on the Air directed by Orson Welles (1938).

While at CBS, Herrmann met Orson Welles and went on to write and arrange scores for Welles's The Mercury Theatre on the Air and The Campbell Playhouse, which adapted literature and film to radio. He conducted the live performances, including Welles's famous adaptation of H.G. Wells's The War of the Worlds, broadcast on October 30, 1938, which consisted entirely of pre-existing music. (Note: Herrmann kept a list of all original music he composed for radio and did not include anything from The War of the Worlds, indicating that there was no new music composed for it. This list is now part of the Bernard Herrmann Papers at the University of California-Santa Barbara.)

When Welles gained his RKO Pictures contract, Herrmann worked for him. He wrote his first film score for Citizen Kane (1941) and received an Academy Award nomination for Best Score of a Dramatic Picture. The aria from the fictional opera Salammbô, which Kane's wife Susan Alexander (Dorothy Comingore) performs, was also composed by Herrmann. Welles wanted Herrmann to do a pastiche of real operas, writing in a telegram "Here is a chance for you to do something witty and amusing." Herrmann used techniques he had learned in radio: "The movies frequently overlook opportunities for musical cues which last only a few seconds—that is, from five to fifteen seconds at the most-the reason being that the eye usually covers the transition. On the other hand, in radio drama, every scene must be bridged by some sort of sound device, so that even five seconds of music becomes a vital instrument in telling the ear that the scene is shifting." On his use of leitmotifs in the score, he remarked: "I am not a great believer in the 'leitmotiv' as a device for motion picture music-but in this film its use was practically imperative, because of the story itself and the manner in which it is unfolded."

Herrmann also scored Welles's The Magnificent Ambersons (1942); like the film, the music was heavily edited by RKO Pictures. When more than half of his score was removed from the soundtrack, Herrmann bitterly severed his ties with the film and promised legal action if his name were not removed from the credits. Herrmann was music director for The Orson Welles Show (1941–1942), which included the debut of his wife Lucille Fletcher's suspense classic The Hitch-Hiker; Ceiling Unlimited (1942), a program conceived to glorify the aviation industry and dramatize its role in World War II; and The Mercury Summer Theatre on the Air (1946). Welles told Peter Bogdanovich that "Benny Herrmann was an intimate member of the family".

Between the films by Welles, he scored William Dieterle's The Devil and Daniel Webster (1941), for which he won his only Academy Award. He recalled layering four violin tracks on top of each other, and "another effect which we got from recording the sound of singing telephone wires at 4 a.m. It was always used whenever the devil (Walter Huston) appears."

Herrmann used large sections of his score for The Campbell Playhouse adaptation of Rebecca for Robert Stevenson's Jane Eyre (1943), the third film in which Welles starred. Other notable scores of the decade include John Brahm's Hangover Square (1945) and John Cromwell's Anna and the King of Siam (1946). His score for Joseph L. Mankiewicz's The Ghost and Mrs. Muir (1947) was a personal favorite.

Herrmann rebutted the charges Pauline Kael made in her 1971 essay "Raising Kane", which revived controversy over the authorship of the screenplay for Citizen Kane. He reworked music from the film in Orson Welles Raises Kane.

=== Collaborations with Alfred Hitchcock ===
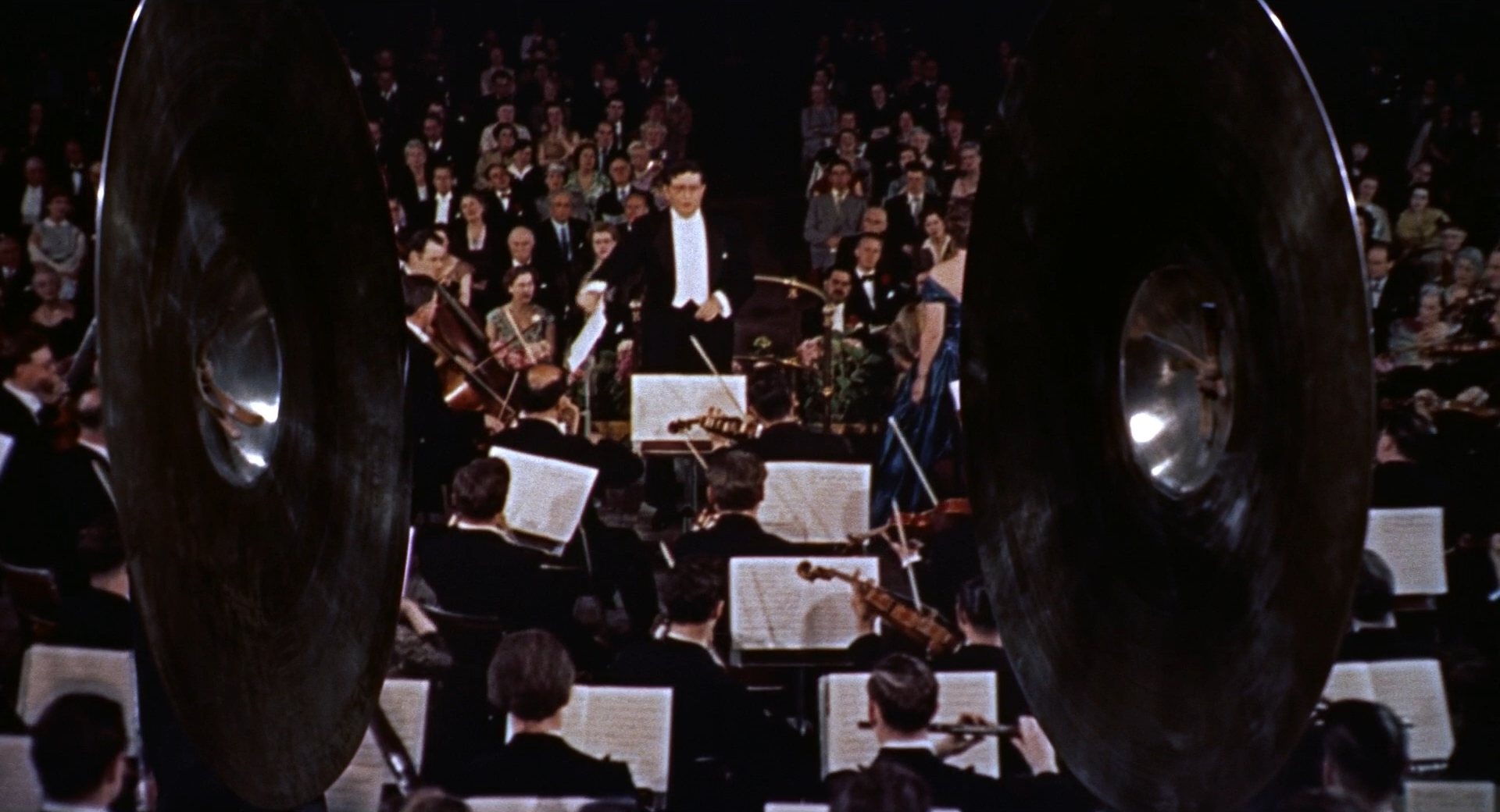
Herrmann conducting the London Symphony Orchestra in a scene from The Man Who Knew Too Much (1956)

Herrmann is most closely associated with his work with Alfred Hitchcock. He worked on the scores for nine Hitchcock films, from The Trouble with Harry (1955) to Marnie (1964). Hitchcock had wanted Herrmann to score Rear Window (1954), but he was unavailable; the film's unique diegetic music was instead provided by Franz Waxman.

The score for The Man Who Knew Too Much (1956) was composed by Herrmann, but two of the most significant pieces in the film – the song "Que Será, Será" and the Storm Clouds Cantata – were not (although he did re-orchestrate Arthur Benjamin's cantata from Hitchcock's 1934 original). The film gave Herrmann the opportunity for a cameo as the conductor of the London Symphony Orchestra in the Royal Albert Hall scene. Herrmann's The Wrong Man score (1956) is in a jazz style and makes heavy use of double bass; Emmanuel Balestrero (Henry Fonda), the wrong man of the title, is a jazz bassist.

His score for Vertigo (1958) is considered by many to be his masterpiece. In many key scenes, Hitchcock let Herrmann's score take center stage. Frequently echoing Richard Wagner's opera Tristan und Isolde, it dramatically conveys the protagonist's obsessive love for the image of a woman and underscores that Vertigo, like Tristan, is a story of love and death. Ross writes that Herrmann's homage to Wagner "is a matter of deliberation and subtlety. The main melodic contour is his own; the harmony is still his idiosyncratic construction. He is jogging the memory of those who know Tristan and the subconscious of those who don't. His veiled citations indicate in their own way the unstoppable recurrence of the past." According to Dan Auiler, Herrmann deeply regretted being unable to conduct his composition for Vertigo; a musicians' strike in the US meant that it was actually conducted in England and Austria by Muir Mathieson. Herrmann always conducted his own music where possible, and given that he considered the Vertigo score among his best work, he regarded it as a missed opportunity.

Herrmann's most famous film music is from Hitchcock's Psycho (1960). The score uses only a string orchestra rather than a full orchestra. Hitchcock admitted at the time that Psycho heavily depended on the music for its tension and sense of pervading doom. David Thomson notes Herrmann's "sly borrowings from Beethoven's Eroica", a recording of which can be seen in the bedroom of Norman Bates (Anthony Perkins). Hitchcock initially wanted the film's famous shower scene to play without music; Herrmann suggested otherwise, and they screened the scene with and without music. Ultimately, Hitchcock decided to include the music. Steven Smith writes "Herrmann made Hitchcock fall in love with the project once again. Herrmann later said he wrote Psycho's score for an all-strings orchestra to create 'a black-and-white sound' to complement the black-and-white photography." Herrmann recalled "The strange thing was the number of colleagues and informed members of the public who have written me letters asking what instruments I used. They couldn't recognise the sound of a string orchestra - the same kind of orchestra which plays the music of Mozart and Haydn."

Herrmann was credited as "sound consultant" on The Birds (1963), which forewent a traditional score for electronically made bird sounds.

In 1963, Herrmann began writing original music for the CBS-TV anthology series The Alfred Hitchcock Hour, which was in its eighth season. Hitchcock served only as advisor on the show, which he hosted, but Herrmann was again working with former Mercury Theatre actor Norman Lloyd, co-producer (with Joan Harrison) of the series. Herrmann scored 17 episodes (1963–1965), and like much of his work for CBS, the music frequently was reused for other programs.

In a question-and-answer session at George Eastman House in October 1973, Herrmann stated that, unlike most film composers who did not have any creative input into the style and tone of the score, he insisted on creative control as a condition of accepting a scoring assignment:

I have the final say, or I don't do the music. The reason for insisting on this is simply, compared to Orson Welles, a man of great musical culture, most other directors are just babes in the woods. If you were to follow their taste, the music would be awful. There are exceptions. I once did a film The Devil and Daniel Webster with a wonderful director William Dieterle. He was also a man of great musical culture. And Hitchcock, you know, is very sensitive; he leaves me alone. It depends on the person. But if I have to take what a director says, I'd rather not do the film. I find it's impossible to work that way.

Herrmann stated that Hitchcock would invite him on to the production of a film and, depending on his decision about the length of the music, either expand or contract the scene. It was Hitchcock who asked Herrmann for the "recognition scene" near the end of Vertigo to be played with music. He recalled "he said when we came to the famous recognition scene, 'If we're going to have music, we won't have one word of dialogue; we'll just have the camera and you.'"

Herrmann's relationship with Hitchcock came to an abrupt end when they disagreed over the score for Torn Curtain (1966). Reportedly pressured by Universal executives, Hitchcock wanted a score that was more jazz- and pop-influenced. Hitchcock's biographer Patrick McGilligan stated that Hitchcock was worried about becoming old-fashioned and felt that Herrmann's music had to change with the times as well. Herrmann initially accepted the offer, but then decided to score the film according to his own ideas. François Truffaut writes that "In Hollywood and elsewhere, it was the practice of the film industry to favor scores that would sell as popular records—the kind of film music that could be danced to in discotheques. In this sort of game, Herrmann, a disciple of Wagner and Stravinsky, was bound to be a loser." Truffaut writes that "Herrmann's removal is a flagrant injustice, since it is a matter of record that his contributions to The Man Who Knew Too Much, North by Northwest, and Psycho had greatly enhanced the success of these films."

Hitchcock listened to only the prelude of the score, then confronted Herrmann about the pop score. Herrmann indignantly replied: "Look, Hitch, you can't outjump your own shadow. And you don't make pop pictures. What do you want with me? I don't write pop music." Hitchcock unrelentingly insisted that Herrmann change the score, violating Herrmann's general claim to the creative control he had always maintained in their previous works together. Herrmann then said "Hitch, what's the use of my doing more with you? I had a career before you, and I will afterwards." The score was rejected and replaced with one by John Addison.

Hitchcock may have hoped to reconcile with Herrmann and have him score Topaz (1969). Wellesnet, the Orson Welles website, reported in April 2009: "Of course, once Herrmann felt he had been wronged, he was not going to say 'yes' to Hitchcock unless he was courted and it seems unlikely that Hitchcock would be willing to do that, although apparently Hitchcock did ask Herrmann back to score his last film Family Plot right before Herrmann died."

In 2009, Norma Herrmann began to auction her husband's personal collection on Bonhams.com. While Herrmann had brought Hitchcock a copy of his classical work after the break-up, Hitchcock had given Herrmann a copy of his 1967 interview book with Truffaut, which he inscribed "To Benny with my fondest wishes, Hitch."

=== Later career ===
From the late 1950s to the mid-1960s, Herrmann scored a series of science fiction and fantasy films, including Journey to the Center of the Earth (1959) and the Ray Harryhausen Dynamation epics The 7th Voyage of Sinbad (1958), Mysterious Island (1961) and Jason and the Argonauts (1963).

Herrmann turned his talents to writing for television. He wrote for Have Gun – Will Travel and Twilight Zone, including the lesser known theme used during the series' first season. He scored several episodes, including "Where Is Everybody?", "Walking Distance", "The Lonely", "Eye of the Beholder" and "Little Girl Lost".

In the mid-1960s, he composed the highly regarded music score for François Truffaut's Fahrenheit 451. Scored for strings, two harps, vibraphone, xylophone and glockenspiel, Herrmann's score created a driving, neurotic mood that recalled Herrmann's scores for Truffaut's favorite director, Alfred Hitchcock. He scored Truffaut's Hitchcock homage The Bride Wore Black (1968).

He scored Brian De Palma's Sisters (1972) and Obsession (1976), variations on the themes of Psycho and Vertigo. De Palma suggested that Herrmann score Martin Scorsese's Taxi Driver (1976). Herrmann agreed to score the film after seeing the scene where Travis Bickle (Robert De Niro) pours schnapps on his cereal. Thomas Hobbs writes of Herrmann's "smoky, airborne jazz notes which are so vivid you can picture pollution smog rising through the cracks of Manhattan's sewers." His last score marks his first extended use of jazz, recalling his score for The Wrong Man, which was a major influence on the film.

== Personal life ==
In 1934, Herrmann met a young CBS secretary and aspiring writer, Lucille Fletcher. She was impressed with Herrmann's work, and the two began a five-year courtship. Marriage was delayed by the objections of Fletcher's parents, who disliked the fact that Herrmann was a Jew and were put off by what they viewed as his abrasive personality. The couple finally married on October 2, 1939. They had two daughters: Dorothy (born 1941) and Wendy (born 1945).

Fletcher was to become a noted radio scriptwriter, and she and Herrmann collaborated on several projects throughout their career. Fletcher helped to write the libretto for his opera, Wuthering Heights, based on Emily Brontë's novel of the same name. The couple divorced in 1948. The next year, he married Lucille's cousin Lucy (Kathy Lucille) Anderson. That marriage lasted until 1964.

By 1967, Herrmann worked almost exclusively in England. In November 1967, the 56-year-old composer married 27-year-old journalist Norma Shepherd, his third wife. In August 1971, the Herrmanns made London their permanent home.

== Death ==
Immediately after finishing the recording of the Taxi Driver score on December 23, 1975, Herrmann viewed the rough cut of what was to be his next film assignment, Larry Cohen's God Told Me To, and dined with Cohen. He returned to his hotel and died from an apparent heart attack in his sleep the next day. Scorsese and Cohen both dedicated their respective films to his memory.

Herrmann was interred in Beth David Cemetery in Elmont, New York.

== Other works ==
As well as his many film scores, Herrmann wrote several concert pieces, including his Symphony in 1941; the opera Wuthering Heights; the cantata Moby Dick (1938), dedicated to Charles Ives; and For the Fallen, a tribute to the soldiers who died in battle in World War II. He recorded all these compositions, and several others, for the Unicorn label during his last years in London. A work written late in his life, Souvenir de Voyages, showed his ability to write non-programmatic pieces.

== Compositional style and philosophy ==
Herrmann's music is typified by frequent use of ostinati (short repeating patterns), novel orchestration, and, in his film scores, an ability to portray character traits not altogether obvious from other elements of the film.

Early in his life, Herrmann committed himself to a creed of personal integrity at the price of unpopularity: the quintessential artist. His philosophy is summarized by a favorite Tolstoy quote: "Eagles fly alone, and sparrows fly in flocks." Thus, Herrmann only composed music for films when he was allowed the artistic liberty to compose what he wished without the director getting in the way. This was the cause of the split with Hitchcock after over a decade of composing scores for the director's films.

His philosophy of orchestrating film was based on the assumption that the musicians were selected and hired for the recording session – that this music was not constrained to the musical forces of the concert hall. For example, his use of nine harps in Beneath the 12-Mile Reef created an extraordinary underwater-like sonic landscape; his use of four alto flutes in Citizen Kane contributed to the unsettling quality of the opening, only matched by the use of 12 flutes in his unused Torn Curtain score. He used the serpent in the score of White Witch Doctor.

Throughout his life, he emphasized the importance of orchestration: "To orchestrate is like a thumbprint. People have a style. I don't understand it, having someone orchestrate. It would be like someone putting color to your paintings."

Herrmann subscribed to the belief that the best film music should be able to stand on its own legs when detached from the film for which it was originally written. To this end, he made several well-known recordings for Decca of arrangements of his own film music as well as music of other prominent composers.

=== Use of electronic instruments ===
Herrmann recalled "The film with the most experimental, avant-garde techniques was the picture I did for Robert Wise, The Day the Earth Stood Still (1951). At that time, we had no electronic sound, but the score had many electronic features which haven't become antiquated at all: electric violin, electric bass, two high and low electric theremins, four pianos, four harps and a very strange section of about 30-odd brass. Alfred Newman said the only thing we needed was an electric hot water bottle, which he supplied."

Robert B. Sexton has noted that this score involved the use of treble and bass theremins (played by Dr. Samuel Hoffmann and Paul Shure), electric strings, bass, prepared piano, and guitar together with various pianos and harps, electronic organs, brass, and percussion, and that Herrmann treated the theremins as a truly orchestral section.

Herrmann was a "sound consultant" on The Birds, which made extensive use of an electronic instrument called the Mixtur-Trautonium, performed by Oskar Sala. Herrmann used several electronic instruments on his score of It's Alive, as well as a Moog synthesizer for the main themes in Endless Night and Sisters.

== Recording ==
Herrmann was an early and enthusiastic proponent of the music of Charles Ives. He met Ives in the early 1930s, performed many of his works while conductor of the CBS Symphony Orchestra, and conducted Ives' Second Symphony with the London Symphony Orchestra on his first visit to London in 1956. Herrmann later made a recording of the work in 1972 and this reunion with the LSO, after more than a decade, was significant to him for several reasons – he had long hoped to record his own interpretation of the symphony, feeling that Leonard Bernstein's 1951 version was "overblown and inaccurate"; on a personal level, it also served to assuage Herrmann's long-held feeling that he had been snubbed by the orchestra after his first visit in 1956. The notoriously prickly composer had also been enraged by the recent appointment of the LSO's new chief conductor André Previn, who Herrmann detested, and deprecatingly referred to as "that jazz boy".

Herrmann was also an ardent champion of the romantic-era composer Joachim Raff, whose music had fallen into near oblivion by the 1960s. During the 1940s, Herrmann had played Raff's 3rd and 5th Symphonies in his CBS radio broadcasts. In May 1970, Herrmann conducted the world premiere recording of Raff's Fifth Symphony Lenore for the Unicorn label, which he mainly financed himself. The recording did not attract much notice in its time, despite receiving excellent reviews, but is now considered a major turning-point in the rehabilitation of Raff as a composer.

Herrmann's film music is well represented on disc. His friend, John Steven Lasher, has produced several albums featuring Urtext recordings, including Battle of Neretva, Citizen Kane, The Kentuckian, The Magnificent Ambersons, The Night Digger and Sisters, under various labels owned by Fifth Continent Australia Pty Ltd.

In 1996, Sony Classical released The Film Scores, a recording of Herrmann's music performed by the Los Angeles Philharmonic under the baton of Esa-Pekka Salonen. This disc received the 1998 Cannes Classical Music Award for Best 20th-Century Orchestral Recording. It was also nominated for the 1998 Grammy Award for Best Engineered Album, Classical.

Decca reissued on CD a series of Phase 4 Stereo recordings with Herrmann conducting the London Philharmonic Orchestra, mostly in excerpts from his various film scores, including one devoted to music from several of the Hitchcock films (including Psycho, Marnie and Vertigo). In the liner notes of the Hitchcock Phase 4 album, Herrmann said that the suite from The Trouble with Harry was a "portrait of Hitch". Another album was devoted to his fantasy film scores – a few of them being the films of the special effects animator Ray Harryhausen, including music from The Seventh Voyage of Sinbad and The Three Worlds of Gulliver. His other Phase 4 Stereo LPs of the 1970s included Music from the Great Film Classics (suites and excerpts from Jane Eyre, The Snows of Kilimanjaro, Citizen Kane and The Devil and Daniel Webster); and "The Fantasy World of Bernard Herrmann" (Journey to the Center of the Earth, The Day the Earth Stood Still, and Fahrenheit 451.)

Charles Gerhardt conducted a 1974 RCA recording titled The Classic Film Scores of Bernard Herrmann with the National Philharmonic Orchestra. It featured suites from Citizen Kane (with Kiri Te Kanawa singing Salammbo's Aria) and White Witch Doctor, along with music from On Dangerous Ground, Beneath the 12-Mile Reef, and the Hangover Square piano concerto.

During his last years in England, between 1966 and 1975, Herrmann made several LPs of other composers' music for assorted record labels. These included Phase 4 Stereo recordings of Gustav Holst's The Planets and Charles Ives's 2nd Symphony, as well as an album titled "The Impressionists" (music by Satie, Debussy, Ravel, Fauré and Honegger) and another titled "The Four Faces of Jazz" (works by Weill, Gershwin, Stravinsky and Milhaud). As well as recording his own film music in Phase 4 Stereo, he made LPs of movie scores by others, such as Great Shakespearean Films (music by Shostakovich for Hamlet, Walton for Richard III and Rózsa for Julius Caesar), and Great British Film Music (movie scores by Lambert, Bax, Benjamin, Walton, Vaughan Williams, and Bliss).

For Unicorn Records, he recorded several of his own concert-hall works, including the cantata Moby Dick, his opera Wuthering Heights, his symphony, and the suites Welles Raises Kane and The Devil and Daniel Webster.

Pristine Audio released two CDs of Herrmann's radio broadcasts. One is devoted to a CBS program from 1945 that features music by Handel, Vaughan Williams and Elgar; the other features works by Charles Ives, Robert Russell Bennett and Herrmann.

=== Influence and legacy ===
His work has left a profound influence on composers of film music that followed him, the most notable being John Williams, Elmer Bernstein, Jerry Goldsmith, Howard Shore, Lalo Schifrin, James Horner, Carter Burwell and others. Nino Rota quoted the power motif from Kane in his score for The Godfather Part II.

Danny Elfman counts Herrmann as his biggest influence, and has said hearing Herrmann's score to The Day the Earth Stood Still when he was a child was the first time he realized the powerful contribution a composer makes to the movies. Pastiche of Herrmann's music can be heard in Elfman's score for Pee-Wee's Big Adventure, specifically in the cues "Stolen Bike" and "Clown Dream", which reference Herrmann's "The Murder" from Psycho and "The Duel With the Skeleton" from 7th Voyage of Sinbad respectively. The prelude for Elfman's main Batman theme references Herrmann's "Mountain Top / Sunrise" from Journey to the Center of the Earth, and the Joker character's "fate motif" heard throughout the score is inspired by Herrmann's Vertigo. More integral homage can be heard in Elfman's later scores for Mars Attacks! and Hitchcock, the latter based on Hitchcock's creation of Psycho, as well as the "Blue Strings" movement of Elfman's first concert work, Serenada Schizophrana.

He has influenced composers beyond film. Stephen Sondheim had an "epiphany" seeing Hangover Square, and describes his Sweeney Todd score as an homage to Herrmann. Sir George Martin, best known for producing and often adding orchestration to the Beatles' music, cites Herrmann as an influence. The Psycho score inspired his staccato string arrangement of the Beatles' "Eleanor Rigby". Martin later expanded on this as an extended suite for McCartney's 1984 film Give My Regards to Broad Street, which features a very recognizable homage to Herrmann's score for Psycho. Elvis Costello paid homage to Herrmann's Hitchcock scores with "Watching the Detectives".

Avant-garde composer/saxophonist/producer John Zorn, in the biographical film A Bookshelf on Top of the Sky, cited Bernard Herrmann as one of his favorite composers and a major influence.

Elmer Bernstein recorded Herrmann's score for The Ghost and Mrs. Muir, released in 1975 on the Varèse Sarabande label and later reissued on CD in the 1990s.

Herrmann's career has been studied extensively by biographers and documentarians. In 1988, Bruce Crawford produced the National Public Radio documentary Bernard Herrmann: A Celebration of His Life and Music. In 1992, Joshua Waletzky made Music for the Movies: Bernard Herrmann, which was nominated for the Academy Award for Best Documentary Feature. In 1991, Steven C. Smith wrote A Heart at Fire's Center: The Life and Music of Bernard Herrmann. The title is derived from one of Herrmann favorite's favorite Stephen Spender poems.

David Thomson calls him the greatest film composer, writing: "Herrmann knew how lovely the dark should be, and he was at his best in rites of dismay, dark dreams, introspection, and the gloomy romance of loneliness. No one else would have dared or known to make the score for Taxi Driver such a lament for impossible love... Yet the score for Taxi Driver is universally cinematic: it speaks to sitting in the dark, full of dread and desire, watching."

== Awards and nominations ==
=== Academy Awards ===
These awards and nominations are recorded by the Motion Picture Academy of Arts and Sciences:

- 1941: Winner, Best Score of a Dramatic or Comedy Picture, The Devil and Daniel Webster (later renamed All That Money Can Buy)
- 1941: Nominee, Music Score of a Dramatic Motion Picture, Citizen Kane
- 1946: Nominee, Best Score of a Dramatic Picture, Anna and the King of Siam
- 1976: Nominee, Original Score, Obsession
- 1976: Nominee, Original Score, Taxi Driver

=== American Film Institute ===
In 2005 the American Film Institute respectively ranked Herrmann's scores for Psycho and Vertigo No. 4 and No. 12 on its list of the 25 greatest film scores. His scores for the following films were also nominated for the list:

- Citizen Kane (1941)
- The Devil and Daniel Webster (1941)
- Jane Eyre (1944)
- The Ghost and Mrs. Muir (1947)
- The Day the Earth Stood Still (1951)
- North by Northwest (1959)
- Taxi Driver (1976)

=== British Academy Film Awards ===
- 1976: Winner, British Academy Film Award, Best Film Music, Taxi Driver

== In popular culture ==
- Featured (music and as a character) in"The Lovesong of Alfred J. Hitchcock" by David Rudkin (BBC Radio, 1993)
- "Marnie", adapted as a song from the theme for the film Marnie, Michael Poss on his 2000 album Silver Screen Serenades
- "The Whistle Song" from Twisted Nerve was used as an opening theme for the Quentin Tarantino film Kill Bill: Volume 1.
- Part of Herrmann's score for The Trouble with Harry was used in a 2010 American television commercial for the Volkswagen CC.
- Music from the Vertigo soundtrack was used in BBC Four's Spitfire Women documentary, aired in the UK in September 2010.
- A 2011 TV commercial titled "Snowpocalypse" for Dodge all-wheel drive vehicles uses Herrmann's main title theme for Cape Fear.
- "Gimme Some More" by Busta Rhymes is based on a sample from Herrmann's score from Psycho.
- The prologue to Lady Gaga's 2011 video for the song Born This Way features Herrmann's Vertigo prelude.
- The 2011 FX series American Horror Story used cues from Twisted Nerve, Psycho, and Vertigo for episode scores.
- The 2011 film The Artist used a soundtrack recording of the love theme from Vertigo. Film actress Kim Novak later voiced her concern about the use of the music, saying that her work "had been violated by The Artist".
- Paul Schackman portrayed Herrmann in the 2012 biopic Hitchcock.
- Herrmann's scores from many Hitchcock films are prominently featured in the New York City immersive theatrical production Sleep No More; particular standouts include the prelude from The Man Who Knew Too Much as audience members wind through the dark portal-like maze at the start of the experience, leading them back in time to the 1930s; moments from Psycho being used to underscore the Macbeth elements of the story; and the characters' hour-long loops restarting to the opening suite from Vertigo.
- Matthew Bourne's 2016 dance theatre work The Red Shoes, based on the 1948 film, uses music from several Herrmann film scores.
- Benny & Hitch – "a brand new radio drama – with live orchestral music – about the extraordinary and explosive relationship between director Alfred Hitchcock and composer Bernard Herrmann", written by Andrew McCaldon. It was performed/recorded live on October 16, 2022, at the Alexandra Palace theatre in London with BBC Concert Orchestra conducted by Ben Palmer. Acting as Hitchcock and Herrmann respectively, Toby Jones (who also portrayed Hitchcock in the BBC/HBO co-production The Girl (2012)) and Tim McInnerny. Also featuring Joanna Monro as Alma Hitchcock, Tara Ward as Lucy Anderson (and Tippi Hedren) and Jonathan Forbes as Lew Wasserman (and briefly as Paul Newman). Broadcast on BBC Radio 3 on December 25, 2022.

== Film scores ==
Year	Title	Director	Notes
1941	Citizen Kane	Orson Welles	Oscar nominee
1941	The Devil and Daniel Webster	William Dieterle	Oscar winner
1942	The Magnificent Ambersons	Orson Welles	Uncredited (at own request); additional cues composed by Roy Webb
1943	Jane Eyre	Robert Stevenson	
1945	Hangover Square	John Brahm	
1946	Anna and the King of Siam	John Cromwell	Oscar nominee
1947	The Ghost and Mrs. Muir	Joseph L. Mankiewicz	
1948	Portrait of Jennie	William Dieterle	Theme
1951	The Day the Earth Stood Still	Robert Wise	Golden Globe nominee
1951	On Dangerous Ground	Nicholas Ray	
1952	5 Fingers	Joseph L. Mankiewicz	
1952	The Snows of Kilimanjaro	Henry King	
1953	White Witch Doctor	Henry Hathaway	
1953	Beneath the 12-Mile Reef	Robert Webb	
1953	King of the Khyber Rifles	Henry King	
1954	Garden of Evil	Henry Hathaway	
1954	The Egyptian	Michael Curtiz	Co-composer: Alfred Newman
1955	Prince of Players	Philip Dunne	
1955	The Trouble with Harry	Alfred Hitchcock	
1955	The Kentuckian	Burt Lancaster	
1956	The Man Who Knew Too Much	Alfred Hitchcock	(cameo – Conductor / Himself), Uncredited
1956	The Man in the Gray Flannel Suit	Nunnally Johnson	
1956	The Wrong Man	Alfred Hitchcock	
1957	Williamsburg: The Story of a Patriot	George Seaton	Short subject
1957	A Hatful of Rain	Fred Zinnemann	
1958	Vertigo	Alfred Hitchcock	
1958	The Naked and the Dead	Raoul Walsh	
1958	The 7th Voyage of Sinbad	Nathan H. Juran	
1959	North by Northwest	Alfred Hitchcock	
1959	Blue Denim	Philip Dunne	
1959	Journey to the Center of the Earth	Henry Levin	
1960	Psycho	Alfred Hitchcock	
1960	The 3 Worlds of Gulliver	Jack Sher	
1961	Mysterious Island	Cy Endfield	
1962	Tender Is the Night	Henry King	
1962	Cape Fear	J. Lee Thompson	
1963	Jason and the Argonauts	Don Chaffey	
1963	The Birds	Alfred Hitchcock	sound consultant
1964	Marnie	Alfred Hitchcock	
1965	Joy in the Morning	Alex Segal	
1966	Torn Curtain	Alfred Hitchcock	unused score
1966	Fahrenheit 451	François Truffaut	
1968	The Bride Wore Black	François Truffaut	
1968	Twisted Nerve	Roy Boulting	main theme featured in Kill Bill: Volume 1 (2003)
1969	Battle of Neretva	Veljko Bulajić	
1971	The Night Digger	Alastair Reid	
1972	Endless Night	Sidney Gilliat	
1972	Sisters	Brian De Palma	
1974	It's Alive	Larry Cohen	
1976	Obsession	Brian De Palma	Oscar nominee; Posthumous release
1976	Taxi Driver	Martin Scorsese	Oscar and Grammy nominee; BAFTA winner; Final film scoring; Posthumous release
1978	It Lives Again	Larry Cohen	Original themes from It's Alive; arranged and conducted by Laurie Johnson

== Television scores ==
Herrmann's work for television includes scores for such westerns as Cimarron Strip, Gunsmoke, Rawhide, Have Gun – Will Travel, as well as the 1968 suspense TV movie Companions in Nightmare.

For The Twilight Zone:

- Opening and closing themes (used only during the 1959–1960 season)
- Where Is Everybody? (first aired October 2, 1959)
- Walking Distance (first aired October 30, 1959)
- The Lonely (first aired November 13, 1959)
- Eye of the Beholder (first aired November 11, 1960)
- Little Girl Lost (first aired March 16, 1962)
- Living Doll (first aired November 1, 1963)

For the Alfred Hitchcock Hour:

- A Home Away from Home (first aired September 27, 1963)
- Terror at Northfield (first aired October 11, 1963)
- You'll Be the Death of Me (first aired October 18, 1963)
- Nothing Ever Happens in Linvale (first aired November 8, 1963)
- The Jar (first aired February 14, 1964)
- Behind the Locked Door (first aired March 27, 1964
- Body in the Barn (first aired July 3, 1964)
- Change of Address (first aired October 12, 1964)
- Water's Edge (first aired October 19, 1964)
- The Life Work of Juan Diaz (first aired October 26, 1964)
- The McGregor Affair (first aired November 23, 1964)
- Misadventure (first aired December 7, 1964)
- Consider Her Ways (first aired December 28, 1964)
- Where the Woodbine Twineth (first aired January 11, 1965)
- An Unlocked Window (first aired February 15, 1965)
- Wally the Beard (first aired March 1, 1965)
- Death Scene (first aired March 8, 1965)

== Radio scores ==
=== Melodrams ===
These works are for narrator and full orchestra, intended to be broadcast over the radio (since a human voice would not be able to be heard over the full volume of an orchestra). In a 1938 broadcast of the Columbia Workshop, Herrmann distinguished "melodrama" from "melodram" and explained that these works are not part of the former, but the latter. The 1935 works were composed before June 1935.

- La Belle Dame sans merci (September 1934)
- The City of Brass (December 1934)
- Annabel Lee (1934–1935)
- Poem Cycle (1935):
  - "The Willow Leaf"
  - "Weep No More, Sad Fountains"
  - "Something Tells"
- A Shropshire Lad (1935)
- Cynara (June 1935)

=== Incidental music ===
See also Columbia Workshop for programs in which Herrmann participated but did not write original music.

- Palmolive Beauty Box (c. 1935) (2 existing cues)
- Dauber (October 1936)
- Rhythm of the Jute Mill (December 1936)
- The Gods of the Mountain (1936)
- The Happy Prince (December 1941)
- A Christmas Carol (1954, a CBS-TV special, after Dickens)
- A Child Is Born (1955, a TV special hosted by Ronald Reagan with singers Nadine Conner and Theodor Uppman)
- Brave New World (1956)

== Stage works ==
- Wuthering Heights: Opera (1951)
- The King of Schnorrers (1968) Musical comedy

== Concert works ==
- The Forest, tone poem for large orchestra (1929)
- November Dusk, tone poem for large orchestra (1929)
- Tempest and Storm: Furies Shrieking!, for piano (1929)
- The Dancing Faun and The Bells, two songs for medium voice and small Chamber orchestra (1929)
- Requiescat, violin and piano (1929)
- Twilight, violin and piano (1929)
- March Militaire (1932), ballet music for Americana Revue (1932)
- Aria for Flute and Harp (1932)
- Variations on "Deep River" and "Water Boy" (1933)
- Prelude to Anathema, for fifteen instruments (1933)
- Silent Noon, for fourteen instruments (1933)
- The Body Beautiful (1935), music from the Broadway play
- Nocturne and Scherzo (1935)
- Sinfonietta for Strings (1935)
- Currier and Ives, suite (1935)
- Violin Concerto, unfinished (1937)
- Moby Dick, cantata (1937)
- Johnny Appleseed, unfinished cantata (1940)
- Symphony No. 1 (1941)
- The Fantasticks (1942)
- The Devil and Daniel Webster, suite (1942)
- For the Fallen (1943)
- Welles Raises Kane (1943)
- Echoes, string quartet (1965)
- Souvenirs de Voyage (1967)

== See also ==
- High Anxiety, Mel Brooks's Hitchcock spoof that parodies many of his devices, including Herrmann's music
- Hitchcock & Herrmann, David Knijnenburg's stage play about the relationship between Herrmann and Hitchcock
