= 5th Open Russian Festival of Animated Film =

The 5th Open Russian Festival of Animated Film was held in from Feb. 10-14 in 2000 at a boarding house called "Birch Grove" two kilometres from the town of Tarusa, Russia. Animated works from the past three years from the Russian Federation were accepted. Along with auteur films, commercial reels, music clips and television bumpers were in competition. There was also a two-minute pilot for The Nutcracker and the Mouse King, a feature film finally released in 2004, and Optimus Mundus, a feature film consisting of 50 independently directed short films about Moscow.

The jury prizes were handed out by profession, with some prizes tailored to the films in competition. No Grand Prix was given out this year. Also, any member or guest of the festival was able to vote for their favourite film.

== Jury ==
English	Profession(s)
Fyodor Khitruk	director, animator
Andrey Khrzhanovskiy	director, animator
Mikhail Aldashin	director, artist
Vladislav Bayramgulov	director, artist
Konstantin Bronzit	director, scenario writer, artist, animator

== Jury prizes ==
Award	Film	Recipient(s) (the director of the film, unless stated otherwise)	Links
Prize for an Original Idea and Colorful Art Direction	The Socks of the Big City; Носки большого города (Noski bolshovo goroda)	Andrey Ushakov	
Prize for Best Debut	The Autumn Has Begun; Наступила осень (Nastupila osen)	Yekatirina Sokolova	
Prize for a Bold Experiment in Bringing Together Animators to Work on a Common Project	Optimus Mundus	n/a	
Prize for Series of Commercials	Cabinet - II; Кабинет - II; Savinov; Савинов	Dmitriy Vysotskiy; Andrey Sikorskiy (artist, animator)	
Prize to Animation Teams	The Tree with the Golden Apples; Дерево с золотыми яблоками (Serevo s zolotymi yablokami); Little Reed Riding Hood; Тростниковая шапочка (Trostnikovaya shapochka)	Animators: Valentin Smeshnikov; Andrey Smirnov; Aleksandr Vikhanskiy --- Vladimir Kadukhin; Olga Veselova; Milana Fedoseyeva; Tatyana Molodova	
Prize for Best Scenario for Children	A Wonderful Supper on Christmas Eve; Удивительный ужин в сочельник (Udivitelnyy uzhin v sochelnik)	Irina Kodyukova (director, scenario)	
Prize for Best Student Film	Nikopeck; Никопейка (Nikopeyka)	Anna Belonogova	
Diploma for Inventive Use of New Technologies	Pharaoh; Фараон (Faraon)	Sergey Ovcharov	
Diploma for Inventive Scenario in a Commercial	Fire; Пожар (Pozhar)	n/a	
Diploma for Being a Cultural Phenomenon	Petrovich, Петрович	n/a	
Diploma for Most Dashing Animatic	The Bag of Deception, Мешок обмана (Meshok obmana)	Rim Sharafutdinov (director, artist, animator)	
Diploma for a Bright Example of Folk Animation	Kolobok, Колобок	Nikolay Bogayevskiy	
Diploma for Successive Development of an Original Technique	Moby Dick, Моби Дик (Mobi Dik)	Natalya Orlova; Natalya Demidova (artist)	

== Rating (by audience vote) ==
Each member of the audience was asked to list their top 5 five films of the festival. 5 points were given for a 1st place vote and so on, down to 1 point for a 5th place vote.

Position	Film	Director	Points	Link
1	The Socks of the Big City; Носки большого города (Noski bolshovo goroda)	Andrey Ushakov	261	
2	Pharaoh; Фараон (Faraon)	Sergey Ovcharov	129	
3	Moby Dick; Моби Дик (Mobi Dik)	Natalya Orlova	108	
4	The Tree with the Golden Apples; Дерево с золотыми яблоками (Serevo s zolotymi yablokami)	Natalya Dabizha	104	
5	Little Reed Riding Hood; Тростниковая шапочка (Trostnikovaya shapochka)	Galina Beda	68	
6	Optimus Mundus	(50 directors)	63	
7	Kolobok; Колобок	Nikolay Bogayevskiy	61	
8	Lukomorye. The Nurse; Лукоморье. Няня (Lukomorye. Nyanya)	Sergey Seregin	58	
9	The Autumn Has Begun; Наступила осень (Nastupila osen)	Yekatirina Sokolova	57	
10	The Story of a Cat with All the Ensuing Consequences; История кота со всеми вытекающеми последствиями (Istoriya kota so vsemi vytekayushchemi posledstviyami)	Natalya Beryozova	56	
