= Glass Wave =

- Origin: Palo Alto, California, U.S.
- Genres: Rock
- Years active: 2008–present
- Labels: Independent
- Members: Robert Pogue Harrison; Dan Edelstein; Christy Wampole; Thomas Harrison; Colin Camarillo; Jay Kadis
- Website: http://www.glasswave-band.com

Glass Wave is an American rock band founded by Stanford University professors Dan Edelstein and Robert Pogue Harrison. Originally formed as a teaching aid for a humanities class, Glass Wave's lyrics are inspired by the classics. Alongside Edelstein and Harrison are vocalist Christy Wampole, bass player Thomas Harrison, drummer Colin Camarillo, and Jay Kadis, who plays guitar and percussion. Their self-titled debut album was released in 2010.
