= Matt Kish =

American artist and illustrator (born 1969)

- Born: Matthew D. Kish; June 4, 1969; Oberlin, Ohio
- Education: self-taught
- Known for: drawing / graphics / illustration / virtual set design
- Notable work: Moby-Dick in Pictures: One Drawing for Every Page; The Inferno in Pictures
- Website: http://www.matt-kish.com/

Matt Kish (born June 4, 1969 in Oberlin, Ohio) is an American artist and illustrator. He is best known for his monograph Moby-Dick in Pictures: One Drawing for Every Page, an illustrated edition of Moby Dick that features one illustration for every page of Herman Melville's novel. He is also known for his illustrated edition of Joseph Conrad's Heart of Darkness. In 2027, Kish's new graphic novel, The Inferno in Pictures, will be published by Tin House Books. This four-color illustrated adaptation of The Inferno will feature 136 original illustrations in mixed media.

Kish also created the virtual set design for San Francisco's Opera Parallèle's 2015 production of Tarik O'Regan's and Tom Phillips' opera Heart of Darkness, as well as UC Santa Cruz's 2015 production and Opera Parallèle's 2017 production of Rachel Portman's opera The Little Prince.

In 2016, Kish's Moby-Dick art was featured as part of "Matt Kish & Robert Del Tredici: Chasing the Whale and Other Endless Pursuits," a temporary exhibit at the Contemporary Arts Center in Cincinnati. Following the exhibit, the Newberry Library in Chicago acquired 81 of Kish's pieces to be included in their "Moby-Dick: Extracts" permanent collection.

== Style ==
=== Every page of Moby Dick ===
Every Page of Moby-Dick, Illustrated is composed of 552 illustrations, produced in a span of 543 days between 2009 and 2011. Every illustration is accompanied by a selected quote from the corresponding page of the Signet Classics paperback edition of the novel. Inspired by Zak Smith’s “Pictures Showing What Happens on Each Page of Thomas Pynchon's Novel Gravity's Rainbow” (2006), Kish decided to devote his efforts to the representation on paper of both active components of his reading process, the visual and imaginative. As far as the core materials he used are concerned, he forced and allowed himself to “explore as many wildly varying types of media and materials” as he could conceive of, from ballpoint pen to stickers, to collage, to spray-paint, to crayon, to charcoal, to acrylic paint with the aim of giving shape to a graphically unique approach to Melville’s masterpiece. He would very loosely sketch a piece on very thick heavy watercolor paper, and then layer in lots of color over which he would eventually go back, to define the illustration. No digital effects were used on the pieces, except for some adjustments after scanning them so that the digital image would more closely resemble the original. Kish drew his illustrations on found paper, the content of which ranges from old radio schematics, to old chemistry books from the 50s, to nautical books, from maps, to tossed out copies of Moby-Dick itself. As the illustrator reached the final stages of his work, he gradually stopped using the found paper, opting instead for plain white watercolor paper or Bristol board for quite a few of the final illustrations - because as the terrifying climax looms, the scope of the novel narrows until the only thing that matters is the Whale”. In contrast, at the beginning, with the entire novel ahead of him, he worked on the exploration and on the exposition of those layers of meaning and symbolism, justifying his choice by saying that it was best done through layering the paint and the ink over the found pages to see what sorts of strange juxtapositions and hidden illuminations that would create. In particular the presence of found paper gave physicality to the co- existence of the literal and symbolic interpretation of the novel. In order to achieve such a goal, he adopted any kind of style of representation, which suggested itself to him, freely choosing between realistic and abstract depictions of subjects and objects, carefully selecting the found paper that would fit his purpose.

== Publications ==
=== Monographs ===
- Moby-Dick in Pictures: One Drawing for Every Page, Tin House Books, 2011 (ISBN 978-1935639138)
- The Inferno in Pictures, Tin House Books, 2027

=== Illustrations ===
- The Woman Who Lived Amongst the Cannibals by Robert Kloss, self-published, 2017
- Il mediatore interlinguistico ed interculturale e il facilitatore linguistico: Natura e competenze edited by Annalisa Brichese and Valeria Tonioli, Marsilio, 2017 (ISBN 978-8831727525) (cover art)
- Gravity Changes by Zach Powers, BOA Editions, 2017 (ISBN 978-1942683377) (cover art)
- The Revelator: A Novel by Robert Kloss, Unnamed Press, 2015 (ISBN 978-1939419507)
- The Desert Places by Amber Sparks and Robert Kloss, Curbside Splendor, 2013 (ISBN 978-0988480483)
- The Graphic Canon, Vol. 3: From Heart of Darkness to Hemingway to Infinite Jest edited by Russ Kick, Seven Stories Press, 2013 (ISBN 978-1609803803) (contributor)
- Heart of Darkness by Joseph Conrad, Tin House Books, 2013 (ISBN 978-1935639664)
- The Alligators of Abraham by Robert Kloss, Mud Luscious Press, 2012 (ISBN 978-0983026396)
