= Moby Dick (1978 film) =

1978 film by Paul Stanley

- Theatrical release poster
- Directed by: Paul Stanley
- Written by: Herman Melville
- Produced by: John Robert
- Starring: Jack Aranson
- Edited by: Peter Knight
- Release date: 1978
- Running time: 90 minutes
- Country: United States
- Language: English
- Budget: $1,175,000 (est.)

Moby Dick is a 1978 filmed one-man version of Herman Melville's classic 1851 novel Moby-Dick. The film starred Jack Aranson, a Shakespearean actor trained in the Old Vic, and was directed by Paul Stanley.
