= Moby Dick—Rehearsed =

American play by Orson Welles

Moby Dick — Rehearsed
- Original language: English
- Written by: Orson Welles
- Genre: Drama

Premiere
- Date: June 16, 1955
- Place: Duke of York's Theatre, London

Moby Dick (sometimes referred to as Moby Dick — Rehearsed) is a two-act drama written by Orson Welles. The play was staged June 16–July 9, 1955, at the Duke of York's Theatre in London, in a production directed by Welles. The original cast included Welles, Christopher Lee, Kenneth Williams, Joan Plowright, Patrick McGoohan, Gordon Jackson, Peter Sallis, and Wensley Pithey. The play was published by Samuel French in 1965.

Welles used minimal stage design. The stage was bare, the actors appeared in contemporary street clothes, and the props were minimal. For example, brooms were used for oars, and a stick was used for a telescope. The actors provided the action, and the audience's imagination provided the ocean, costumes, and the whale.

Welles filmed approximately 75 minutes of the production, with the original cast, at the Hackney Empire and Scala Theatres in London. He hoped to sell the film to Omnibus, the United States television series which had presented his live performance of King Lear in 1953; but Welles stopped shooting when he was disappointed in the results. The film is lost.

== Plot ==
The setting is a mid-19th-century American repertory theater. The play begins subtly as the audience arrives with the cast milling around an empty stage. The cast members generally fool around and complain about their boss and their forthcoming production of King Lear. Then, making a big dramatic entrance and smoking a cigar, the actor manager of the time comes on stage and tells them they are going to rehearse a version of Herman Melville's 1851 novel Moby Dick that the Young Actor has been adapting for the stage.

The cast grudgingly performs the play, improvising scenery from items lying around, and gradually get more into character as the play develops.

== Productions ==
=== London ===
Directed by Orson Welles, the original production of Moby Dick — Rehearsed ran June 16–July 9, 1955, at the Duke of York's Theatre, London. Programmes for the London run, including the opening night performance, give the title as simply Moby Dick.

Actor	Role
Gordon Jackson	A Young Actor/Ishmael
Christopher Lee / Peter Sallis	A Stage Manager/Flask
Patrick McGoohan	A Serious Actor/Starbuck
Wensley Pithey	A Middle-Aged Actor/Stubb
Joan Plowright	A Young Actress/Pip
Orson Welles	An Actor Manager/Father Mapple/Ahab
Kenneth Williams	A Very Serious Actor/Elijah and others
Joseph Chelton	A Manager/Tashtego
John Gray	An Assistant Stage Manager/Bo'sun
Jefferson Clifford	An Experienced Actor/Peleg

=== New York ===
Directed by Douglas Campbell, Moby Dick was presented on Broadway November 28–December 8, 1962, at the Ethel Barrymore Theatre. Orson Welles was not involved in the production, which ran 13 performances.

Actor	Role
Bruno Gerussi	A Young Actor/Ishmael
Max Helpmann	A Cynical Actor/Flask
Roy Poole	A Serious Actor/Starbuck
Hugh Webster	Actor with Newspaper/Stubb
Frances Hyland	A Young Actress/Pip
Rod Steiger	An Actor Manager/Father Mapple/Ahab
Bill Fletcher	Member of the Company/Elijah
Louis Zorich	Middle-aged Actor/Tashtego
William Needles	Stage Manager/Peleg/Voice of The Rachel
David Thomas	An Old Pro/The Carpenter
John Horton	Member of the Company/The Mastheader/Voice of The Bachelor
Lee Morrison	Member of the Company/Queequeg
Melvin Scott	Member of the Company/Daggoo

The play has since been performed numerous times on both sides of the Atlantic.

== Film ==
Orson Welles filmed approximately 75 minutes of the original 1955 production, with the original cast, at the Hackney Empire and Scala Theatres in London. He hoped to sell the film to Omnibus, the United States television series which had presented his live performance of King Lear in 1953; but Welles stopped shooting when he was disappointed in the results. The film is lost, with the only copy believed to have been destroyed when a fire broke out at Welles's Madrid home in 1970, while he rented it to the actor Robert Shaw, who was drunkenly smoking in bed.

Because the film is lost, many people have speculated it was never created. However, evidence supporting the film having been made can be found in the book, The Films of Christopher Lee, by Pohle Jr. and Hart – Patrick McGoohan said in a 1986 interview that the excerpt of the film he saw while Welles was reviewing the rushes one day was fantastic.

In The Fabulous Orson Welles, by Peter Noble, cameraman Hilton Craig reveals: "it was by no means merely a photographed stage-play. On the contrary, it was shot largely in close-ups and looked very impressive on near-completion."

Kenneth Williams' autobiography Just Williams records Williams' apprehension at the project, as it was filmed by the play's cast in just one weekend at the then-abandoned Hackney Empire theatre. He describes how Welles' dim, atmospheric stage lighting made some of the footage so dark as to be unwatchable. At least 40 minutes of the play was filmed, but is now presumed lost.

Of the film project, Welles's official biographer Barbara Leaming wrote in 1985:

Persistent rumours over the years have hinted that there is a finished film of Welles's Moby Dick — Rehearsed stashed away somewhere, but Orson had barely started the film when he gave it up. "We shot for three days", he recalls, "and it was obvious it wasn't going to be any good, so we stopped. There was no film made at all. We only did one and a half scenes. I said, let's not go on and waste our money, because it's not going to be any good."

In support of this, Leaming quotes Welles's friend at the time, the playwright Wolf Mankowitz, who said: "Orson's attitude is a very pragmatic one. He thinks until you get on the set with the actors and lights and the rest of it, you don't know whether it's going to work or not. And he simply reserves the right as an artist to sort of drop it if it doesn't work."

It is believed that the Munich Film Museum, which holds many of Welles's unfinished films, is in possession of the reels of the unfinished film; but by the time they had been donated in the 1990s, the reels had deteriorated beyond recovery; nonetheless, the museum is preserving these reels in case future technologies may be able to recover them.

The Moby Dick — Rehearsed film is not to be confused with a later unfinished film project in 1971, wherein Welles filmed 22 minutes of various scenes from the play, playing all the parts himself. The footage of that film was acquired by the Munich Film Museum in 1995 and restored in 1999.

== Other film versions ==
The play was adapted for Australian television in 1965.
