= Moby Dick (cantata) =

Moby Dick is a dramatic cantata for two tenors, two basses, male chorus, and orchestra by the American composer Bernard Herrmann with a libretto by Clark Harrington based on Herman Melville's eponymous novel. The work was composed between February 1937 and August 1938 while Herrmann was music director at CBS and it was premiered in 1940 at Carnegie Hall in New York City by the New York Philharmonic under the conductor John Barbirolli. The piece is dedicated to Herrmann's friend and fellow composer Charles Ives.

== Composition ==
Hermann originally conceived Moby Dick as an opera, but found the novel too vast in scope and instead asked the librettist Clark Harrington to help him adapt the work into a cantata. While composing the work, Herrmann and Harrington took trips to Massachusetts in the summers of 1937 and 1938 to research the novel. Herrmann later revised the work in 1973, having previously recorded it with the London Philharmonic Orchestra in 1967. The completed work lasts approximately 45 minutes in performance and is composed primarily in tonal Romanticism. James Leonard of the AllMusic Guide has compared the work to that of Herrmann's 20th-century contemporaries Arnold Bax, Frederick Delius, and Ralph Vaughan Williams.

== Reception ==
Phillip Scott of Limelight praised the work as "dramatic and skilfully orchestrated, befitting a born film composer, with tension deftly maintained throughout the work's 46 minutes." Andrew Clements of The Guardian described the cantata as being "much closer to the world of Herrmann's later film music" and "a mix of imposing choral set-pieces, orchestral interludes and solo narrations." Mark Swed of the Los Angeles Times also praised the work, calling it an "unjustly neglected" cantata. Malcolm Riley of Gramophone similarly opined, "It is a remarkably vivid piece, displaying the dramatic skills learnt in the composing atelier of a radio studio, and deserves to be much better known and more often performed."

== Discography ==
- 1967 - Pye Records TPLS 13006: John Amis, Robert Bowman, Aeolian Singers, London Philharmonic Orchestra, Bernard Herrmann - reissued as Unicorn-Kanchana UKCD2061, 1993.
- 2011 - Chandos Records CHSA 5095: Richard Edgar-Wilson, David Wilson-Johnson, Danish National Choir, Danish National Symphony Orchestra, Michael Schønwandt
- 2011 - The Barbirolli Society SJB 1056: Robert Weede, William Hain, William Horne, Male Chorus of the Westminster Choir, Philharmonic-Symphony Orchestra of New York, Sir John Barbirolli - CD reissue

== Sources ==
- Smith, Steven C. (1991). A Heart at Fire's Center: The Life and Music of Bernard Herrmann. University of California Press; First Edition, With a New Preface edition (May 31, 2002). ISBN 0520927230.
- Leonard, James (2005). Woodstra, Chris; Brennan, Gerald; Schrott, Allen (eds.). All Music Guide to Classical Music: The Definitive Guide to Classical Music. Backbeat Books. ISBN 0879308656.
