= Moby Dick (unfinished film) =

- Directed by: Orson Welles
- Written by: Herman Melville
- Produced by: Orson Welles; Stefan Drössler (reconstruction supervisor)
- Starring: Orson Welles
- Cinematography: Gary Graver
- Running time: 22 minutes
- Country: United States
- Language: English

Moby Dick is an unfinished film by Orson Welles, filmed in 1971. It is not to be confused with the incomplete (and now lost) 1955 film Welles made of his meta-play Moby Dick—Rehearsed, or with the 1956 film Moby Dick, in which Welles played a supporting role.

The film consists of readings by Welles from Herman Melville's 1851 novel Moby-Dick, shot against a blue background with various optical illusions to give the impression of being at sea. It was made during a break in the filming of The Other Side of the Wind. There is some ambiguity about what Welles intended to do with the footage, and how he was going to compile it. It remained unedited in his lifetime.

After Welles' death in 1985, all of his unfinished films were bequeathed to his long-term companion and mistress Oja Kodar, and she in turn donated many of them (including Moby Dick) to the Munich Film Museum for preservation and restoration. In 1999 the Munich Film Museum then edited together the rushes into a 22-minute cut, which has subsequently been screened at numerous film festivals.

The restored footage has never been released on video or DVD, although some unrestored clips can be seen in Vassili Slovic's 1995 documentary Orson Welles: the One Man Band.
