= No I.D. production discography =

The following list is a discography of production by No I.D., an American hip hop record producer from Chicago, Illinois. It includes a list of songs produced, co-produced and remixed by year, artist, album and title.

== Singles produced ==
List of singles as either producer or co-producer, with selected chart positions and certifications, showing year released, performing artists and album name
Title	Year	Peak chart positions										Certifications	Album
Title	Year	US	US R&B	US Rap	CAN	GER	NLD	NZ	SWE	SWI	UK	Certifications	Album
"Take It EZ" (Common Sense)	1992	—	—	5	—	—	—	—	—	—	—		Can I Borrow a Dollar?
"Breaker 1/9" (Common Sense)	1992	—	107	10	—	—	—	—	—	—	—		Can I Borrow a Dollar?
"Soul by the Pound" (Common Sense)	1993	—	108	7	—	—	—	—	—	—	—		Can I Borrow a Dollar?
"I Used to Love H.E.R." (Common Sense)	1994	—	91	31	—	—	—	—	—	—	—		Resurrection
"Resurrection" (Common Sense)	1994	102	88	22	—	—	—	—	—	—	—		Resurrection
"Retrospect for Life" (Common featuring Lauryn Hill)	1997	—	—	—	—	—	—	—	—	—	—		One Day It'll All Make Sense
"Smile" (G-Unit)	2004	—	72	—	—	—	—	—	—	—	—		Beg for Mercy
"Let Me Hold You" (Bow Wow featuring Omarion)	2005	4	2	1	—	—	—	—	—	—	27	RIAA: Platinum	Wanted
"Ooh Wee" (Majic Massey)	2005	—	—	—	—	—	—	—	—	—	—		—N/a
"Outta My System" (Bow Wow featuring T-Pain and Johntá Austin)	2006	22	12	2	—	—	—	2	—	—	—	RIAA: Platinum	The Price of Fame
"Put It on Ya" (Plies featuring Chris J)	2008	31	8	6	—	—	—	—	—	—	—		Da REAList
"Heartless" (Kanye West)	2008	2	4	1	8	37	31	6	17	46	10	RIAA: 4× Platinum; BPI: Silver	808s & Heartbreak
"D.O.A. (Death of Auto-Tune)" (Jay-Z)	2009	24	43	15	—	—	—	—	—	—	79		The Blueprint 3
"Run This Town" (Jay-Z featuring Kanye West and Rihanna)	2009	2	3	1	6	18	30	9	8	9	1	RIAA: 2× Platinum; BPI: Silver; RMNZ: Gold	The Blueprint 3
"Find Your Love" (Drake)	2010	5	3	—	10	—	85	—	—	—	24	RIAA: Platinum	Thank Me Later
"Mr. Rager" (Kid Cudi)	2010	77	—	—	—	—	—	—	—	—	—		Man on the Moon II: The Legend of Mr. Rager
"Ready Set Go" (Killer Mike featuring T.I.)	2010	—	110	—	—	—	—	—	—	—	—		PL3DGE
"My Last" (featuring Chris Brown)	2011	30	4	1	—	—	—	—	—	—	—	RIAA: Gold	Finally Famous
"Ghetto Dreams" (Common featuring Nas)	2011	—	—	—	—	—	—	—	—	—	—		The Dreamer/The Believer
"Blue Sky" (Common)	2011	—	—	—	—	—	—	—	—	—	—		The Dreamer/The Believer
"Sweet" (Common)	2011	—	—	—	—	—	—	—	—	—	—		The Dreamer/The Believer
"Celebrate" (Common)	2011	—	95	—	—	—	—	—	—	—	—		The Dreamer/The Believer
"This Time" (Melanie Fiona featuring J. Cole)	2012	—	89	—	—	—	—	—	—	—	—		The MF Life
"Daughters" (Nas)	2012	—	78	—	—	—	—	—	—	—	—		Life Is Good
"Accident Murderers" (Nas featuring Rick Ross)	2012	—	—	—	—	—	—	—	—	—	—		Life Is Good
"Pain" (Pusha T featuring Future)	2012	—	—	—	—	—	—	—	—	—	—		My Name Is My Name
"Switch Up" (Big Sean featuring Common)	2013	—	50	—	—	—	—	—	—	—	—		Hall of Fame
"Black Skinhead" (Kanye West)	2013	69	21	15	66	—	—	—	—	—	34		Yeezus
"Holy Grail" (Jay-Z featuring Justin Timberlake)	2013	4	2	1	13	24	83	24	15	24	7	RIAA: 3× Platinum; BPI: Silver; RMNZ: Gold	Magna Carta Holy Grail
"Control" (Big Sean featuring Kendrick Lamar and Jay Electronica)	2013	111	43	—	—	—	—	—	—	—	—		—N/a
"Bound 2" (Kanye West)	2013	12	3	3	74	—	—	—	—	—	55		Yeezus
"Satellites" (Tassho Pearce featuring Kid Cudi)	2014	—	—	—	—	—	—	—	—	—	—		G.O.O.D. Company
"Kingdom" (Common featuring Vince Staples)	2014	—	—	—	—	—	—	—	—	—	—		Nobody's Smiling
"To Love & Die" (Jhené Aiko featuring Cocaine 80s)	2014	—	46	—	—	—	—	—	—	—	72		Souled Out
"Speak My Piece" (Common)	2014	—	—	—	—	—	—	—	—	—	—		Nobody's Smiling
"Diamonds" (Common featuring Big Sean)	2014	—	—	—	—	—	—	—	—	—	—		Nobody's Smiling
"The Story of O.J." (Jay-Z)	2017	23	10	7	53	—	—	—	—	—	28		4:44
"4:44" (Jay-Z)	2017	35	15	11	69	—	—	—	—	—	73		4:44
"Bam" (Jay-Z featuring Damian Marley)	2017	47	21	16	—	—	—	—	—	—	93		4:44
"Blue's Freestyle / We Family" (Jay-Z featuring Blue Ivy Carter)	2017	—	—	—	—	—	—	—	—	—	—		4:44
"New Light" (John Mayer)	2018	—	—	—	—	—	—	—	—	—	—		Sob Rock

== 1992 ==
=== Common Sense - Breaker 1/9 (VLS) ===
- A2. "Breaker 1/9 (Slope Remix)"

=== Common Sense - Can I Borrow a Dollar? ===
(All songs produced with The Twilite Tone)

- 01. "A Penny for My Thoughts"
- 02. "Charms Alarm"
- 03. "Take It EZ"
- 05. "Breaker 1/9"
- 06. "Two Scoops of Raisins"
- 07. "No Defense"
- 08. "Blows to the Temple"
- 09. "Just in the Nick of Rhyme"
- 10. "Tricks Up My Sleeve"
- 11. "Puppy Chow"
- 12. "Soul by the Pound"
- 13. "Pitchin' Pennies"

== 1993 ==
=== Common Sense - Soul by the Pound (VLS) ===
- A1. "Soul by the Pound (Thump Remix)"

== 1994 ==
=== Common Sense - Resurrection ===
- 01. "Resurrection"
- 02. "I Used to Love H.E.R."
- 03. "Watermelon"
- 04. "Book of Life"
- 05. "In My Own World (Check the Method)" [featuring No I.D.]
- 07. "Nuthin' to Do"
- 08. "Communism"
- 09. "WMOE"
- 10. "Thisisme"
- 11. "Orange Pineapple Juice"
- 13. "Maintaining"
- 15. "Pop's Rap"

== 1995 ==
=== Common Sense - Resurrection (VLS) ===
- A1. "Resurrection '95"

=== Scha Dara Parr - The Cycle Hits-Remix Best Collection ===
- 09. "Tsuiteru Otoko '94 Haru (No I.D. Remix)"

== 1996 ==
=== Al' Tariq - God Connections ===
- 07. "No Question" (featuring Black Attack, Problemz & The Rawcotiks)
- 13. "Everybody's Talking"

=== Grav - Down to Earth ===
- 11. "Sex"

=== Mind Space - Life Is Foul (VLS) ===
- A3. "Who Got the Funk?"

=== Various artists - America Is Dying Slowly ===
- 10. "(Lately) I've Been Thinking" - Common & Sean Lett

=== Various Artists - Relativity Urban Assault ===
- 05. "The Real Weight" - No ID

== 1997 ==
=== Common - One Day It'll All Make Sense ===
- 01. "Introspective"
- 02. "Invocation"
- 04. "Retrospect for Life" (featuring Lauryn Hill) (produced with James Poyser)
- 05. "Gettin' Down at the Ampitheather" (featuring De La Soul)
- 06. "Food for Funk"
- 07. "G.O.D. (Gaining One's Definition)" (featuring Cee-Lo Green) (produced with Spike Rebel)
- 09. "Hungry"
- 11. "Stolen Moments, Pt. I"
- 12. "Stolen Moments, Pt. II" (featuring Black Thought)
- 13. "Stolen Moments, Pt. III" (featuring Q-Tip)
- 15. "Making a Name for Ourselves" (featuring Canibus)

=== Saukrates - Brick House ===
- B2. "Play Dis (Remix)" [featuring Common]

=== Various artists - Soul in the Hole (soundtrack) ===
- 09. "High Expectations" - Common

== 1998 ==
=== All Natural - No Additives, No Preservatives ===
- 12. "Thinkin' Cap"

=== Mondo Grosso - The Man from the Sakura Hills ===
- C1. "Things Keep Changin' (No I.D.'s Use Your Common Sense Mix)"

== 1999 ==
=== Bigg Nastee - My Life, Dreams & Feelings ===
- 02. "Done Been One"
- 15. "What That Girl" (featuring Shawnna)

=== Infamous Syndicate - Changing the Game ===
- 02. "Here I Go"
- 04. "Hold It Down"
- 10. "It's Alright"

=== The Madd Rapper - Tell 'Em Why U Madd ===
- 17. "Not the One" (produced with Kanye West)

=== Various artists - World Record Holders ===
- 24. "Let My Niggas In" - Go Getters (produced with Kanye West)

== 2001 ==
=== Beanie Sigel - The Reason ===
- 09. "Man's World"

=== Presence - Let It Begin ===
- 14. "One of a Kind" (produced with Dug Infinite)

== 2002 ==
=== Toni Braxton - More Than a Woman ===
- 01. "Let Me Show You the Way (Out)"

=== Jaheim - Still Ghetto ===
- 02. "Diamond in da Rough"

=== Jay-Z - The Blueprint²: The Gift & The Curse ===
- 07. "All Around the World" (featuring LaToiya Williams)

=== Midwikid - Something Wikid This Way Comes... ===
- 04. "Like We Sposed Ta" (featuring Jaheim)

=== 4IZE - The Cake Song (VLS) ===
- A1. "The Cake Song"
- A4. "Oh My God" (bonus track)
- B1. "Said So"

== 2003 ==
=== DMX - Grand Champ ===
- 15. "We Go Hard" (featuring Cam'ron)

=== G-Unit - Beg for Mercy ===
- 11. "Smile" (performed by Lloyd Banks)

=== Ice Grillz - Fire N Ice ===
- 12. "Get Weary"

=== K. Fox - Life (L.A. to Chicago) (VLS) ===
- A1. "Life (L.A. to Chicago)"
- B1. "Closer"

== 2004 ==
=== Ghostface Killah - The Pretty Toney Album ===
- 05. "Metal Lungies" (featuring Sheek Louch & Styles P)
- 18. "Love" (featuring Musiq & K. Fox)

=== Method Man - Tical 0: The Prequel ===
- 08. "Tease" (featuring Chinky)

=== Chico & Coolwadda - Parallel ===
- 03. "E'rthang" (featuring Young Roscoe)
- 05. "Wild N D' West II" (featuring 40 Bronzon, Defari & Neb Luv)
- 06. "Psssh" (featuring Cy Bravo & Joe Wells)

=== Rah Digga - Everything Is a Story ~~(unreleased)~~ ===
- 01. "Intro" (featuring Ghostface Killah)

== 2005 ==
=== Bow Wow - Wanted ===
- 03. "Let Me Hold You" (featuring Omarion) (co-produced by Jermaine Dupri)

=== Crisis - Beautiful Mind ===
- 12. "I Can't Stand"

=== Do or Die - D.O.D. ===
- 03. "Be Alright" (featuring Ric Jilla and Johnny P.)

=== J.U.I.C.E. - All Bets Off ===
- 08. "Weekend Girl" (featuring Profound)

=== Jamie Foxx - Unpredictable ===
- 08. "Three Letter Word"

=== Majic Massey - Ooh Wee (VLS) ===
- A1. "Ooh Wee"
- B1. "I Got That" (featuring Kaye Fox)

=== Ric Jilla - On the What (VLS) ===
- A1. "On the What (Radio Version)"

== 2006 ==
=== Bossman - You're Wrong (VLS) ===
- A1. "You're Wrong"

=== Bow Wow - The Price of Fame ===
- 03. "4 Corners" (featuring Lil Wayne, Lil Scrappy, Pimp C, Short Dawg) (co-produced by Jermaine Dupri & LRoc)
- 04. "Outta My System" (featuring T-Pain) (co-produced by Jermaine Dupri & LRoc)

=== Daz Dillinger - So So Gangsta ===
- 01. "Thang on My Hip"

=== Janet Jackson - 20 Y.O. ===
- 05. "Do It to Me" (produced by Jermaine Dupri, No I.D. and Jimmy Jam & Terry Lewis)

=== Joy Denalane - Born & Raised ===
- 01. "Change" (featuring Lupe Fiasco)
- 11. "Born & Raised"

=== Naledge - Will Rap for Food ===
- 13. "Broke Diaries"

=== Rampage - Demagraffix ===
- 14. "The Demagraffix Interlude"

=== Rhymefest - Blue Collar ===
- 04. "Fever"
- 06. "Get Down"
- 08. "Chicago-Rillas (featuring Mikkey) (produced with Miykal Snoddy)
- 12. "Sister" (featuring Mike Payne) (co-produced by Rhymefest)

=== Various artists - CTA Radio - Chi City Hip Hop ===
- 24. "Driving By" (performed by The Usual Suspects)

== 2007 ==
=== Ali & Gipp - Kinfolk ===
- 05. "Almost Made Ya" (featuring LeToya Luckett) (produced by Jermaine Dupri, co-produced by No I.D. and L-Roc)

=== iCON the Mic King - Rent Money Music II: C-Notes For The Car Note ===
- 10. "Conjugation"

=== Jay-Z - American Gangster ===
- 12. "Success" (featuring Nas) (co-produced by Jermaine Dupri)
- 13. "Fallin'" (featuring Bilal) (produced by Jermaine Dupri, co-produced by No I.D.)

== 2008 ==
=== Plies - Da REAList ===
- 16. "Put It on Ya"

=== Kanye West - 808s & Heartbreak ===
- 03. "Heartless" (produced with Kanye West)
- 10. "See You in My Nightmares" (featuring Lil Wayne) (produced with Kanye West)
- 11. "Coldest Winter" (produced with Kanye West & Jeff Bhasker)

=== Killer Mike - I Pledge Allegiance to the Grind II ===
- 07. "God in the Building" (produced by The Cancer & Kidz with Machine Gunz, co-produced by No I.D.)

=== Janet Jackson - Discipline ===
- 17. "The 1" (produced by Jermaine Dupri co-produced by Manuel Seal and No I.D.)

=== Various artists - Chicago Underworld Vol. 3 ===
- 11. "Rebel to America" (performed by Mikkey Halsted)

== 2009 ==
=== Jim Jones - Pray IV Reign ===
- 01. "Intro" (co-produced by Chink Santana)

=== Jay-Z - The Blueprint 3 ===
- 01. "What We Talkin' About" (produced with Kanye West)
- 02. "Thank You" (produced with Kanye West)
- 03. "D.O.A. (Death of Auto-Tune)"
- 04. "Run This Town" (featuring Kanye West & Rihanna) (produced with Kanye West)
- 09. "A Star Is Born" (featuring J. Cole) (produced with Kanye West)

=== Michael Jackson - The Remix Suite ===
- 17. "Who's Lovin' You (No ID Remix)"

=== Twista - Category F5 ===
- 16. "Alright" (featuring Kanye West) (produced with Kanye West)

=== Fabolous - Loso's Way ===
- 03. "Makin' Love" (featuring Ne-Yo) (co-produced by Jermaine Dupri)

== 2010 ==
=== Drake - Thank Me Later ===
- 06. "Show Me a Good Time" (Produced with Kanye West & Jeff Bhasker)
- 13. "Find Your Love" (Produced with Kanye West & Jeff Bhasker)
- 00. "You Know,You Know" (Produced With Kanye West & Prolyfic)

=== Rick Ross - Teflon Don ===
- 03. "Tears of Joy" (featuring Cee Lo Green)

=== Big Sean - Finally Famous v.3 Mixtape ===
- 04. "Money & Sex" (featuring Bun B)

=== Jazmine Sullivan - Love Me Back ===
- 10. "Famous" (produced with Prolyfic)

=== Kid Cudi - Man on the Moon II: The Legend of Mr. Rager ===
- 01. "Scott Mescudi vs. the World" (featuring Cee Lo Green) (produced with Emile & The Smeezingtons)
- 02. "REVOFEV" (produced with Plain Pat)
- 10. "The Mood" (produced with Emile)
- 12. "Mr. Rager" (produced with Emile & Jeff Bhasker)
- 16. "GHOST!" (produced with Emile)

=== RPA & The United Nations of Sound - United Nations of Sound ===
- entire album

=== Kanye West - My Beautiful Dark Twisted Fantasy ===
- 01. "Dark Fantasy" (produced with RZA, Kanye West, Jeff Bhasker & Mike Dean)
- 02. "Gorgeous" (featuring Kid Cudi & Raekwon) (produced with Kanye West, Mike Dean & Ken Lewis)
- 07. "So Appalled" (featuring Jay-Z, Cyhi Da Prynce, RZA & Pusha T) (produced with Kanye West, Mike Dean & Jeff Bhasker)
- 14. "See Me Now" (featuring Big Sean, Charlie Wilson, Beyoncé) (produced with Kanye West & Lex Luger)

== 2011 ==
=== Killer Mike - PL3DGE ===
- 04. "Ready Set Go" (featuring T.I.)
- 15. "Ready Set Go (Remix)" (featuring T.I. & Big Boi)

=== Cocaine 80s - The Pursuit ===
- Entire Album

=== Big Sean - Finally Famous: The Album ===
- 02. "I Do It" (produced with The Legendary Traxster)
- 03. "My Last" (featuring Chris Brown)
- 04. "Don't Tell Me You Love Me"
- 05. "Wait for Me" (featuring Lupe Fiasco) (produced with Exile)
- 09. "Memories (Part II)"
- 11. "Live This Life" (featuring The-Dream)
- 12. "So Much More"
- 13. "What Goes Around" (Bonus Track)
- 14. "Celebrity" (co-produced with Filthy Rockwell) (Bonus Track)

=== Jay-Z & Kanye West - Watch the Throne ===
- 15. "Primetime" (Bonus Track)

=== Ed Sheeran - + ===
- 11. "Kiss Me"

=== J. Cole - Cole World: The Sideline Story ===
- 12. "Never Told"
- 00. "Stay"
- 00. "100 Grand"
- 00. "Not Too Late" (featuring K. Fox)
- 00. "Fayetteville Tales"
- 00. "The Bad Self"

=== Cocaine 80s - Ghost Lady ===
- Entire Album

=== Rihanna - Talk That Talk ===
- 07. "We All Want Love"

=== Common - The Dreamer/The Believer ===
- Entire Album

== 2012 ==
=== The World Famous Tony Williams - King or the Fool ===
- 12. "Mr. Safety" (featuring Raheem DeVaughn and Stokley Williams)

=== Melanie Fiona - The MF Life ===
- 01. "This Time" (featuring J. Cole)
- 03. "Break Down These Walls"
- 12. "L.O.V.E." (featuring John Legend)

=== Cocaine 80s - Express OG ===
- Entire Album

=== Nas - Life Is Good ===
- 02. "Loco-Motive" (featuring Large Professor)
- 04. "Accident Murderers" (featuring Rick Ross)
- 05. "Daughters"
- 10. "Back When"
- 12. "Stay"
- 18. "Where's the Love" (featuring Cocaine 80s) (bonus)

=== Ne-Yo - R.E.D. ===
- 15. "My Other Gun"

=== Slaughterhouse - Welcome to: Our House ===
- 06. "Get Up"

=== T.I. - Trouble Man: Heavy Is the Head ===
- 04. "Wild Side" (featuring ASAP Rocky)

=== Rihanna - Unapologetic ===
- 13. "No Love Allowed"

== 2013 ==
=== Cocaine 80's - The Flower of Life ===
- Entire Album

=== Logic - Young Sinatra: Welcome to Forever ===
- 19. "Man of the Year"

=== Kanye West - Yeezus ===
- 02. "Black Skinhead" (add. production)
- 10. "Bound 2" (add. production)

=== Jay-Z - Magna Carta... Holy Grail ===
- 01. "Holy Grail" (featuring Justin Timberlake) (add. production)

=== Big Sean - Hall of Fame ===
- 03. "10 2 10" (produced with Travis Scott and Key Wayne)
- 07. "First Chain" (featuring Nas and Kid Cudi)
- 11. "Sierra Leone" (produced with James Poyser)
- 13. "World Ablaze" (featuring James Fauntleroy II)
- 15. "All Figured Out"
- 17. "Switch Up" (featuring Common, produced with DJ Mano and Rob Kinelski)

Leftover

- "Control" (featuring Kendrick Lamar and Jay Electronica)

=== Pusha T - My Name Is My Name ===
- 11. "Pain" (featuring Future) {co-produced with Kanye West}

=== Jhené Aiko - Sail Out ===
- 07. "Comfort Inn Ending (Freestyle)"

== 2014 ==
=== Vince Staples - Shyne Coldchain Vol. 2 ===
- 02. "Locked & Loaded"
- 03. "Humble"
- 04. "45"
- 08. "Turn"
- 09. "Shots"
- 10. "Earth Science"

=== Common - Nobody's Smiling ===
- Entire Album

Leftover

- 00. "War"
- 00. "Made In Black America" (featuring Ab-Soul)

=== Jhené Aiko - Souled Out ===
- 03. "To Love & Die" (featuring Cocaine 80s)
- 04. "Spotless Mind"
- 00. "It's Cool"
- 09. "Brave"
- 11. "Promises" (featuring Miyagi and Namiko)
- 12. "Pretty Bird (Freestyle)" (featuring Common)
- 14. "Blue Dream"
- 16. "Beautiful Ruin"

=== Vince Staples - Hell Can Wait ===
- 04. "Hands Up"

=== Jeezy - Seen It All: The Autobiography ===
- 09. "Fuck the World" {produced with Trakmatik}

== 2015 ==
=== Vince Staples - Summertime '06 ===
Disc 1

- 01. "Ramona Park Legend, Pt. 1"
- 02. "Lift Me Up"
- 05. "Loca"
- 06. "Lemme Know" (featuring Jhené Aiko and DJ Dahi)
- 07. "Dopeman" (featuring Joey Fatts and Kilo Kish)
- 08. "Jump off the Roof" (featuring Snoh Aalegra)

Disc 2

- 01. "Ramona Park Legend Pt. 2"
- 02. "3230"
- 04. "Might Be Wrong" (featuring Haneef Talib)
- 05. "Get Paid" (featuring Desi Mo)
- 06. "Street Punks"
- 07. "Hang N' Bang" (featuring A$ton Matthews)
- 08. "C.N.B."
- 09. "Like It Is"
- 10. "'06"

== 2016 ==
=== Rihanna - Anti ===
- 12. "Higher"

=== Vince Staples - Prima Donna ===
- 06. "Pimp Hand"

=== Tassho Pearce - G.O.O.D. Company ===
- 02. "Satellites" (featuring Kid Cudi)

== 2017 ==
=== Logic - Everybody ===
- 06. "America" (featuring Black Thought, Chuck D, Big Lenbo & No I.D., produced with 6ix & Logic)

=== Vic Mensa - The Manuscript ===
- 01. "Almost There" (featuring Mr. Hudson)
- 03. "Rollin' Like a Stoner" (produced with Larrance Dopson, Mike Dean & Da Internz)

=== JAY-Z - 4:44 ===
- Entire Album

=== Vic Mensa - The Autobiography ===
- 01. "Didn't I (Say I Didn't)" (produced with Smoko Ono, Papi Beatz, Vic Mensa & Carter Lang)
- 02. "Memories on 47th St." (produced with 1500 or Nothin' & DJ Dahi)
- 04. "Homewrecker" (featuring Weezer) (produced with Vic Mensa)
- 05. "Gorgeous" (featuring Syd) (produced with 1500 or Nothin')
- 06. "Heaven on Earth" (featuring The-Dream) (produced with Smoko Ono, Papi Beatz & Vic Mensa)
- 08. "Down for Some Ignorance (Ghetto Lullaby)" (featuring Chief Keef & Joey Purp) (produced with Mike Dean & Vic Mensa)
- 09. "Coffee & Cigarettes" (produced with Papi Beatz & Om'Mas Keith)
- 12. "The Fire Next Time"

=== Snoh Aalegra - Feels ===
- 01. "All I have (Intro)" (produced with Maneesh, Leven Kali and Stelios Phili)
- 06. "You Keep Me Waiting" (featuring Vic Mensa) (produced with Ryan Marrone)
- 10. "Feels"
- 11. "Like I Used To" (featuring Timbuktu) (produced with Dammo and Khirye Tyler)

== 2018 ==
=== John Mayer - Sob Rock ===
- 03. "New Light" (Produced with John Mayer)

=== Alessia Cara - The Pains of Growing ===
- 09. "Comfortable" {produced with Steve Wyreman}

=== Drake - Scorpion ===
Side A

- 01. "Survival" (produced with Noah "40" Shebib)
- 02. "Nonstop" (additional production)
- 04. "Emotionless" (produced with Noah "40" Shebib & The 25th Hour)

Side B

- 02. "Summer Games" (additional production)

=== Sade - "Flower of the Universe" ===
- A2. "Flower of the Universe (Remix)"

== 2019 ==
=== Nas - The Lost Tapes 2 ===
- 16. "Beautiful Life" (featuring RaVaughn)

=== Snoh Aalegra - Ugh, Those Feels Again ===
- 01. "Here Now (Intro)" (Produced with Maneesh & Snoh Aalegra)
- 07. "Love Like That" (Produced with Johan Lenox)
- 09. "Charleville 9200, Pt. II" (Produced with Steve Wyreman)
- 12. "Nothing to Me" (Produced with Maneesh)
- 13. "I Didn't Mean to Fall in Love" (Produced with Maneesh)

== 2020 ==
=== Jay Electronica - A Written Testimony ===
- 08. "Fruits of the Spirit"

=== Logic - No Pressure ===
- 03. "GP4" (Produced with 6ix)
- 04. "Celebration" (Produced with Logic)
- 12. "A2Z" (Produced with Bidaye)
- 15. "Obediently Yours"

=== Big Sean - Detroit 2 ===
- 17. "The Baddest"

== 2021 ==
=== Snoh Aalegra - Temporary Highs in the Violet Skies ===
- 01. "Indecisive" (Produced with Johan Lenox)
- 02. "Lost You" (Produced with Maneesh)
- 06. "We Don't Have to Talk About It" (Produced with Doctor O)
- 12. "Taste" (Produced with Terrace Martin)

== 2022 ==
=== Brent Faiyaz - Wasteland ===
- 02. "Loose Change" (Produced with Brent Faiyaz, Jordan Ware, Paperboy Fabe and Raphael Saadiq)
- 15. "Role Model" (Produced with Brent Faiyaz, Jordan Ware and Paperboy Fabe)

=== Beyoncé - Renaissance ===
- 07. "Church Girl" (Produced with Beyoncé, The-Dream and Stuart White)

== 2023 ==
=== Killer Mike - Michael ===
- 02. "Shed Tears"
- 03. "Run"
- 07. "Scientists & Engineers" {produced with André 3000, James Blake, DJ Paul & Twhy Exclusive}
- 11. "Something For Junkies" {produced with Don Cannon, Audio Anthem, J Dot & Little Shalimar}
- 12. "Motherless"
- 13. "Don't Let the Devil" {produced with El-P & Little Shalimar}

== 2024 ==
=== ¥$ (Kanye West and Ty Dolla Sign) - Vultures 1 ===
- 04. "Talking / Once Again" (Produced with Ye, Swizz Beatz, James Blake, DJ Camper and Edsclusive)
- 14. "Good (Don't Die)" (Produced with Ye, will.i.am, Johnny Goldstein and Bbykobe)

== 2025 ==
=== From the Private Collection of Saba and No I.D. with Saba ===
- Entire Album

== 2026 ==
=== IDK - e.t.d.s. ===
- 02. "Halo" (produced with Daoud)
- 10. "Cell Block Freestyle / CD On" (produced with IDK)

== Upcoming ==
=== Keithian - Bayou Boy ===
- 00. "I'm Open"
