= List of songs recorded by Common =

The following is a list of songs by Common organized by alphabetical order. The songs on the list are all included in official label-released albums, soundtracks and singles, and may include some white label or other non-label releases. Next to the song titles is the album, soundtrack or single on which it appears. Remixes and live versions of songs are listed as bullet points below the original song, but clean, explicit, a cappella and instrumental tracks are not included.

== 0-9 ==
1. "1'2 Many..." featuring Dug Infinite (One Day It'll All Make Sense, 1997)
2. "8 Minutes to Sunrise" featuring Jill Scott (Wild Wild West Soundtrack, 1999)
3. "90 in the Red (Interlude)" by Chantay Savage (I Will Survive (Doin' It My Way), 1995)

== A ==
1. "A Dream" featuring will.i.am (Freedom Writers (Music from the Motion Picture), 2007)
2. "A Film Called (Pimp)" featuring Bilal and MC Lyte (Like Water for Chocolate, 2000)
3. "A Freestyle Song" by KRS-One (D.I.G.I.T.A.L., 2003)
4. "A New Way of Thinking" by Common (Disco White Label - Tom Tom Club, 2008)
5. "A Penny for My Thoughts" (Can I Borrow a Dollar?, 1992)
6. "A Song for Assata" featuring Cee-Lo (Like Water for Chocolate, 2000)
7. "Act Too (The Love of My Life)" by The Roots (Things Fall Apart, 1999)
  - "Love of My Life" by The Roots (The Roots Come Alive, 1999)
  - "Again (Remix)" by Faith Evans; featuring Ghostface Killah (Remixed, Unreleased and Featured, 2006)
8. "All Night Long" featuring Erykah Badu (One Day It'll All Make Sense, 1997)
  - "All Night Long (Brand New Heavies Remix)" featuring Erykah Badu (The 24 Hour Woman Soundtrack, 1999)
9. "Angel" by Game (L.A.X., 2006)
10. "Another Wasted Nite With..." (Resurrection, 1994)
11. "Any Given Sunday" featuring Guru and Jamie Foxx (Any Given Sunday Soundtrack, 2000)
12. "Aquarius" featuring Bilal and Erykah Badu (Electric Circus, 2002)

== B ==
1. "Back Home" by Fort Minor; featuring Styles of Beyond (The Rising Tied, 2005)
2. "Back to Basics" by Kanye West (Late Registration (International Version), 2005)
3. "Be (Intro)" (Be, 2005)
4. "Between Me, You & Liberation" featuring Cee-Lo (Electric Circus, 2002)
5. "Blows to the Temple" (Can I Borrow a Dollar?, 1992)
6. "Book of Life" (Resurrection, 1994)
7. "Break My Heart" (Finding Forever, 2007)
8. "Breaker 1/9" (Can I Borrow a Dollar?, 1992)
  - "Breaker 1/9 (Slope Remix)" ("Breaker 1/9," 1992)
  - "Breaker 1/9 (Beat Nuts Remix)" ("Breaker 1/9," 1992)
9. "Bulls-Eye (Suddenly)" by Syleena Johnson (Chapter III: The Flesh, 2005)

== C ==
1. "Can-I-Bust" featuring Ynot ("Soul by the Pound," 1993)
2. "Car Horn" ("Car Horn," 1999)
3. "Chapter 13 (Rich Man vs. Poor Man)" featuring Ynot (Resurrection, 1994)
4. "Charms Alarm" (Can I Borrow a Dollar?, 1992)
5. "Chi-City" (Be, 2005)
6. "Cold Blooded" featuring Black Thought and Rahzel (Like Water for Chocolate, 2000)
7. "Come Close" featuring Mary J. Blige (Electric Circus, 2002)
  - "Come Close (Boozoo Bajou Version)" by Boozoo Bajou; featuring Mary J. Blige (Remixes, 2003)
  - "Come Close (Remix) (Closer)" featuring Erykah Badu, Pharrell and Q-Tip ("Come Close (Remix) (Closer)," 2003)
  - "Come Close to Me (Blackbeard's Summer Madness Reworks)" ("Come Close To Me (Blackbeard's Summer Madness Reworks)," 2003)
  - "Come Close to Me (Blackbeard's Summer Madness Reworks) [Broken Dub]" ("Come Close To Me (Blackbeard's Summer Madness Reworks)," 2003)
  - "Come Over to My Place (Remix)" by Davina ("Come Over to My Place," 1998)
8. "Common Calling (Interlude)" by Roy Davis Jr. (Chicago Forever, 2004)
9. "Common Freestyle" by Funkmaster Flex (The Mix Tape Volume 3: 60 Minutes of Funk, 1998)
10. "Common Freestyle" by Tony Touch (Power Cypha 3: The Grand Finale, 1999)
11. "Common Free Style" by The RH Factor (Hard Groove, 2003)
12. "Communism" (Resurrection, 1994)
13. "Confusion" by Just Ro (Make It Happen, 1996)
14. "CpH Claimin' Respect #2" by The Boulevard Connection; featuring Ed O.G. and Masta Ace ("CpH Claimin' Respect #2," 2004)
  - "CpH Claimin' Respect #2 (Remix)" by The Boulevard Connection; featuring Ed O.G. and Masta Ace ("CpH Claimin' Respect #2," 2004)

== D ==
1. "Da Bizness" by De La Soul (Stakes Is High, 1996)
2. "Dance for Me" by Mary J. Blige (No More Drama, 2001)
  - "Dance for Me (Plutonium Mix)" by Mary J. Blige ("Dance for Me," 2001)
3. "Days of Our Lives" by De La Soul (The Grind Date, 2004)
4. "Don't Charge Me for the Crime" by Jonas Brothers feat. Common (Lines, Vines and Trying Times, 2009)
5. "Don't Come My Way" featuring Renee Neufville and Slick Rick (Whiteboyz Soundtrack, 1999)
6. "Dooinit" (Like Water for Chocolate, 2000)
7. "Drivin' Me Wild" featuring Lily Allen (Finding Forever, 2007)
8. "Don't forget who you are" featuring PJ Plays (Bookmarks, 2020)

== E ==
1. "E=MC2" by J Dilla (The Shining, 2006)
2. "Electric Wire Hustler Flower" featuring Sonny Sandoval (Electric Circus, 2002)
3. "Embrace the Chaos" by Ozomatli (Embrace the Chaos, 2001)
4. "Enough Beef" by Sway & King Tech; featuring Chino XL and Royce Da 5'9" (Back 2 Basics, 2005)

== F ==
1. "Faithful" featuring Bilal and John Legend (Be, 2005)
  - "Faithful (Live)" (Sessions@AOL EP, 2005)
2. "Ferris Wheel" featuring Marie Daunle and Vinia Mojica (Electric Circus, 2002)
3. "Food for Funk" (One Day It'll All Make Sense, 1997)
4. "Fresh Rhymes Everyday" by MC Juice; featuring O-Type Star ("Fresh Rhymes Everyday," 1996)
5. "Full Moon" by Armand Van Helden (Killing Puritans, 2000)
6. "Funk Shit" by Marley Marl (Hip Hop Dictionary, 2000)
7. "Funky for You" featuring Bilal and Jill Scott (Like Water for Chocolate, 2000)

== G ==
1. "G.O.D. (Gaining One's Definition)" featuring Cee-Lo (One Day It'll All Make Sense, 1997)
2. "Get 'Em High" by Kanye West; featuring Talib Kweli (The College Dropout, 2004)
  - "Get 'Em High (Remix)" by Kanye West; featuring Talib Kweli ("Get 'Em High (Remix)," 2004)
3. "Geto Heaven Remix T.S.O.I. (The Sound of Illadelph)" featuring Macy Gray (Like Water for Chocolate, 2000)
  - "Geto Heaven (T.S.O.I. Brooklyn Funk Remix)" featuring Macy Gray ("Geto Heaven," 2001)
4. "Gettin' Down at the Amphitheater" featuring De La Soul (One Day It'll All Make Sense, 1997)
5. "Ghetto Dreams" featuring Nas (The Dreamer, The Believer, 2011)
6. "Ghetto Heaven" by D'Angelo (Unreleased Rare & Live, 2000)
  - "Geto Heaven Part 2" featuring D'Angelo (Like Water for Chocolate, 2000)
7. "Ghetto Show" by Talib Kweli; featuring Anthony Hamilton (The Beautiful Struggle, 2004)
8. "Gimme Sum (Rap Version)" by Omar; featuring Ashman, Canitbe and Rodney P (Sing (If You Want It), 2006)
  - "Gimme Sum (Vocal Version) [Bonus Track]" by Omar; featuring Ashman, Canitbe & Rodney P (Sing (If You Want It), 2006)
9. "Glory" from the 2014 movie Selma, with John Legend, (2014)
10. "Go!" featuring John Mayer and Kanye West (Be, 2005)
  - "Go! (Jazzanova Remix)" featuring John Mayer, Joy Denalane and Kanye West ("Go (Jazzanova Remix)," 2006)
  - "Go (Remix)" featuring John Mayer, Joy Denalane and Kanye West ("Go (Remix)," 2005)
  - "Go! (Live)" (Sessions@AOL EP, 2005)
11. "Goodlife" by T.I.; featuring Pharrell (King, 2006)
12. "Ghetto Dreams" featuring Nas (The Dreamer, The Believer, 2011)

== H ==
1. "He Loves Me" (9th Wonder remix) by Brittany Howard (Jaime (Reimagined), 2021)
2. "Heat" featuring Jay Dee (Like Water for Chocolate, 2000)
3. "Heaven Somewhere" featuring Bilal, Cee-Lo, Erykah Badu, Jill Scott, Lonnie Lynn, Mary J. Blige and Omar (Electric Circus, 2002)
4. "Heidi Hoe" (Can I Borrow a Dollar?, 1992)
5. "High Expectations" (Soul in the Hole Soundtrack, 1997)
6. "High Post Brotha" by Jill Scott (Experience: Jill Scott 826+, 2001)
7. "Hungry" (One Day It'll All Make Sense, 1997)
8. "Hurricane" featuring Black Thought, Dice Raw, Flo Brown, Jazzyfatnastees, Mos Def and The Roots (The Hurricane Soundtrack, 2000)

== I ==
1. "I Am Music" featuring Jill Scott (Electric Circus, 2002)
2. "I Got a Right Ta" featuring Pharrell (Electric Circus, 2002)
3. "I Used to Love H.E.R." (Resurrection, 1994)
4. "I Want You" (Finding Forever, 2007)
  - "I Will Survive (Silk's Old Skool Remix)" by Chantay Savage ("I Will Survive," 1996)
  - "I Will Survive (Kay Fingers Remix)" by Chantay Savage ("I Will Survive," 1996)
5. "In My Own World (Check the Method)" featuring No I.D. (Resurrection, 1994)
6. "In the Sun" by Shaquille O'Neal; featuring Black Thought and Joi (Shaquille O'Neal Presents His Superfriends, Vol. 1, 2001)
  - "In The Sun (Remix)" by Shaquille O'Neal; featuring Black Thought and Joi ("In The Sun (Remix)," 2001)
7. "Interlude" by DJ Honda (DJ Honda, 1996)
8. "Interview 1" by Kid Capri; featuring Joe Clair (Soundtrack to the Streets, 1998)
9. "Interview 2" by Kid Capri; featuring Joe Clair (Soundtrack to the Streets, 1998)
10. "Intro" (Finding Forever, 2007)
11. "Introspective" (One Day It'll All Make Sense, 1997)
12. "Invocation" (One Day It'll All Make Sense, 1997)
13. "It's Your World, Pt. 1 & 2" featuring Bilal and Lonnie Lynn (Be, 2005)

== J ==
1. "Jam" by Alliance Ethnik; featuring Rahzel (Fat Comeback, 1999)
  - "Jesus Walks (Remix)" by Kanye West; featuring Mase (One Million Strong, Vol. 2: Love Peace & War, 2005)
2. "Jimi Was a Rock Star" featuring Erykah Badu (Electric Circus, 2002)
3. "Just in the Nick of Rhyme" (Can I Borrow a Dollar?, 1992)

== L ==
1. "(Lately) I've Been Thinking" featuring Sean Lett (America Is Dying Slowly, 1996)
2. "Letter to the Free" featuring Bilal (Black America Again, 2016)
3. "Life Goes On" by Kid Capri; featuring Allure, AZ and Case (Soundtrack to the Streets (UK Version), 1998)
4. "Like They Used to Say" ("One-Nine-Nine-Nine," 1999)
5. "Live from the Stretch Armstrong Show" by Stretch and Bobbito; featuring Absolute, Black Thought and Pharoahe Monch (Lyricist Lounge, Volume One, 1998)
6. "Love Is..." (Be, 2005)
7. "Love It or Leave It Alone/Welcome to Jamrock" by Alicia Keys; featuring Damian Marley and Mos Def (Unplugged, 2005)
8. "Love of My Life (An Ode to Hip Hop)" by Erykah Badu (Brown Sugar Soundtrack, 2002)

== M ==
1. "Maintaining" (Resurrection, 1994)
2. "Making a Name for Ourselves" featuring Canibus (One Day It'll All Make Sense, 1997)
3. "Maybe One Day" by Brand Nubian (Foundation, 1998)
4. "Missing Link" by Femi Kuti (Fight to Win, 2001)
5. "Misunderstood" (Finding Forever, 2007)
  - "Morning Fun (Remix)" by Vikter Duplaix (A Seduction of International Affairs, 2003)
6. "Music for Life" by Hi-Tek; featuring Busta Rhymes, J Dilla, Marsha Ambrosius and Nas (Hi-Teknology 2: The Chip, 2006)
7. "My City" featuring Malik Yusef (One Day It'll All Make Sense, 1997)
8. "My Way Home" by Kanye West (Late Registration, 2005)

== N ==
1. "Nag Champa (Afrodisiac for the World)" featuring Jay Dee (Like Water for Chocolate, 2000)
2. "New Wave" featuring Laetitia Sadier (Electric Circus, 2002)
3. "No Competition" by DJ Skribble (Traffic Jams 2000, 1999)
4. "No Defense" (Can I Borrow a Dollar?, 1992)
5. "Nuthin' to Do" (Resurrection, 1994)

== O ==
1. "Orange Pineapple Juice" (Resurrection, 1994)
2. "One-Nine-Nine-Nine" featuring Sadat X and Talib Kweli (Soundbombing II, 1999)
3. "One Four Love (Part 1)" featuring Doug E. Fresh, Kool G Rap, Mos Def, Pharoahe Monch, Posdnuos, Rah Digga, Shabaam Sahdeeq, Sporty Thievz and Talib Kweli (Hip Hop for Respect EP, 2000)
4. "Out for the Cash (5 Deadly Venoms)" by DJ Honda; featuring Fat Joe and The Beatnuts (DJ Honda, 1996)
  - "Pre of Cash (Remix)" by DJ Honda; featuring Fat Joe and The Beatnuts ("Pre of Cash," 1995)

== P ==
1. "Panthers" featuring dead prez and The Last Poets ("Panthers," 2004)
  - "Panthers (Illmind Remix)" featuring dead prez and The Last Poets ("Panthers," 2004)
  - "Panthers (Maneuvers Remix)" featuring dead prez and The Last Poets ("Panthers," 2004)
  - "Panthers (Tony Galvin Remix)" featuring dead prez and The Last Poets ("Panthers," 2004)
2. "Payback Is a Grandmother" (Like Water for Chocolate, 2000)
3. "Pitchin' Pennies" (Can I Borrow a Dollar?, 1992)
4. "Play Dis" by Saukrates (Brick House, 1997)
  - "Play Dis (Remix)" by Saukrates (Brick House, 1997)
  - "Play Dis (99 Remix)" by Saukrates (The Underground Tapes, 1999)
5. "Play Your Cards Right" featuring Bilal (Finding Forever (Bonus Edition), 2007)
6. "Pop's Rap" featuring Lonnie Lynn (Resurrection, 1994)
7. "Pop's Rap III...All My Children" featuring Lonnie Lynn (Like Water for Chocolate, 2000)
8. "Pop's Rap Part 2/Fatherhood" featuring Lonnie Lynn (One Day It'll All Make Sense, 1997)
9. "Puppy Chow" featuring Tarsha Jones (Can I Borrow a Dollar?, 1992)

== R ==
1. "Real Compared to What" by Mýa (Moodring, 2003)
2. "Real Nigga Quotes" (One Day It'll All Make Sense, 1997)
3. "Real People" (Be, 2005)
4. "Reminding Me (Of Sef)" featuring Chantay Savage (One Day It'll All Make Sense, 1997)
  - "Reminding Me (Of Sef) - The Roots Remix" ("Reminding Me (of Sef)," 1997)
5. "Reminisce" by Bilal; featuring Mos Def (1st Born Second, 2001)
6. "Respiration" by Black Star (Black Star, 1998)
  - "Respiration (Remix)" by Black Star (Hip Hop Classics Vol. 1, 2001)
7. "Resurrection" (Resurrection, 1994)
  - "Resurrection '95" ("Resurrection," 1995)
  - "Resurrection (Extra P. Remix)" ("Resurrection," 1995)
  - "Resurrection (Large Professor Remix)" ("Resurrection," 1995)
  - "Resurrection (Remix)" by Zo! (Special Limited EP!, 2006)
8. "Retrospect for Life" featuring Lauryn Hill (One Day It'll All Make Sense, 1997)

== S ==
1. "She Wants to Move (Native Tongues Remix)" by N*E*R*D; featuring De La Soul, Mos Def and Q-Tip ("Maybe," 2004)
2. "Slam Pit" by The Beatnuts; featuring Cuban Link (A Musical Massacre, 1999)
3. "So Far to Go" by J Dilla; featuring D'Angelo (The Shining, 2006)
  - "So Far to Go" by featuring D'Angelo (Finding Forever, 2007)
4. "Soul by the Pound" (Can I Borrow a Dollar?, 1992)
  - "Soul by the Pound (Thump Mix)" ("Soul by the Pound, 1993)
5. "Soul Power" (Electric Circus, 2002)
6. "Southside" featuring Kanye West (Finding Forever, 2007)
7. "Star *69 (PS with Love)" featuring Bilal (Electric Circus, 2002)
8. "Stand Up for Something" with Andra Day (Mashall, 2017)
9. "Start the Show" (Finding Forever, 2007)
10. "State of Clarity" by Guru; featuring Bob James (Jazzmatazz, Vol. 4: The Hip-Hop Jazz Messenger: Back To The Future, 2007)
11. "State to State" by No I.D.; featuring Dug Infinite (Accept Your Own and Be Yourself (The Black Album), 1997)
12. "Stolen Moments Pt. I" (One Day It'll All Make Sense, 1997)
13. "Stolen Moments Pt. II" featuring Black Thought (One Day It'll All Make Sense, 1997)
14. "Stolen Moments Pt. III" featuring Q-Tip (One Day It'll All Make Sense, 1997)
15. "Sunshine/6th Sense (J.Period Remix)" (Getting Out Our Dreams: The Class of '06 Mixtape, 2006)
16. "Sum Shit I Wrote" (Resurrection, 1994)
17. "Supastar" by Floetry (Flo'Ology, 2005)

== T ==
1. "Take It EZ" (Can I Borrow a Dollar?, 1992)
  - "Take It EZ (Jazz Instrumental)" ("Take It EZ," 1992)
2. "Tears + Sorrow" featuring Me'Shell NdegéOcello and Djelimady Tounkara (Red Hot + Riot: The Music and Spirit of Fela Kuti, 2002)
3. "Tell Me What We're Gonna Do Now" by Joss Stone (Introducing Joss Stone, 2007)
4. "Testify" (Be, 2005)
  - "Testify (Remix)" featuring Darien Brockington ("Testify (Remix)," 2005)
  - "Testify (Live)" (Sessions@AOL EP, 2005)
5. "The 6th Sense" featuring Bilal (Like Water for Chocolate, 2000)
6. "The Bitch in Yoo" ("The Bitch in Yoo," 1996)
7. "The Bizness" by De La Soul (Stakes Is High, 1996)
8. "The Corner" featuring Kanye West and The Last Poets (Be, 2005)
  - "The Corner (Remix)" by Scarface; featuring Kanye West, Mos Def and The Last Poets (My Homies Part 2, 2005)
9. "The Food" featuring Kanye West ("The Food," 2004)
  - "The Food (Live)" featuring Kanye West (Be, 2005)
10. "The Game" featuring DJ Premier (Finding Forever, 2007)
11. "The Hustle" featuring Dart Chillz and Omar (Electric Circus, 2002)
12. "The Light" (Like Water for Chocolate, 2000)
  - "The Light (Remix)" featuring Erykah Badu (Bamboozled Soundtrack, 2000)
13. "The Mic Is Set" by Emmigrands ("2 Philadelphie a Paris," 1996)
14. "The Movement" (2K6: The Tracks, 2005)
15. "The People" featuring Dwele (Finding Forever, 2007)
16. "The Questions" featuring Mos Def (Like Water for Chocolate, 2000)
17. "The Remedy" by A Tribe Called Quest (Get on the Bus Soundtrack, 1996)
18. "The Sun God" by Hi-Tek; featuring Vinia Mojica (Hi-Teknology, 2001)
19. "The Truth" by Pharaohe Monch; featuring Talib Kweli (Internal Affairs, 1999)
20. "Thelonius" featuring Slum Village (Like Water for Chocolate, 2000)
21. "They Say" featuring John Legend and Kanye West (Be, 2005)
22. "Thisisme" (Resurrection, 1994)
23. "Time Travelin' (A Tribute to Fela)" featuring Femi Kuti and Vinia Mojica (Like Water for Chocolate, 2000)
24. "Time Travelin' Reprise" featuring Vinia Mojica (Like Water for Chocolate, 2000)
25. "Tricks Up My Sleeve" featuring Rayshel (Can I Borrow a Dollar?, 1992)
26. "Trouble in the Water" with Malik Yusef, Kumasi, ft. Aaron Fresh, Choklate, Laci Kay (2016)
27. "Two Scoops of Raisins" featuring Immenslope (Can I Borrow a Dollar?, 1992)

== U ==
1. "U Still Got It (Interlude)" by Jamie Foxx (Unpredictable, 2005)
2. "U, Black Maybe" featuring Bilal (Finding Forever, 2007)
3. "UNIverse at War" by The Roots (Illadelph Halflife, 1996)

== V ==
1. "Verbal Murder 2" by Pete Rock; featuring Big Pun and Noreaga (Soul Survivor, 1998)

== W ==
1. "Wack Niggas" by Consequence; featuring Kanye West and Talib Kweli (Take 'Em to the Cleaners, 2004)
2. "Watermelon" (Resurrection, 1994)
3. "We Can Make It Better" by Kanye West; featuring Q-Tip, Rhymefest and Talib Kweli (Hurricane Relief: Come Together Now, 2005)
4. "Where I'm Going" by Melanie Durrant (Where I'm Going, 2005)
5. "While I'm Dancin'" by DJ JS-1 & Dub-L; featuring Prime (Ground Original Presents: Claimstake, 2003)
  - "While I'm Dancin' (Remix)" featuring Prime ("While I'm Dancin'," 2002)
  - "Why! Remix" by Jadakiss; featuring Anthony Hamilton, Nas and Styles P ("Why! Remix," 2004)
6. "WMOE" (Resurrection, 1994)
7. "Wouldn't You Like to..." by Malik Yusef; featuring Kanye West and JV (The Malik Yusef Presents...The Greatest Chicago Fire - Cold Day in Hell , 2003)
8. "we will rock you" by the turtles

== Y ==
1. "Yelling Away" by Zap Mama; featuring Ahmir 'Questlove' Thompson and Talib Kweli (Ancestry in Progress, 2004)
  - "Yelling Away (Hezekiah Remix)" by Zap Mama; featuring Ahmir 'Questlove' Thompson and Talib Kweli ("Yelling Away," 2005)
  - "Yelling Away (Z Productions Remix)" by Zap Mama; featuring Ahmir 'Questlove' Thompson and Talib Kweli ("Yelling Away," 2005)
  - "Yelling Away (Oddisee Remix)" by Zap Mama; featuring Oddisee and Talib Kweli (Halftooth Records Presents: You Think You Know Volume II, 2005)
2. "Years Of Tears and Sorrow" (Red Hot + Riot: The Music and Spirit of Fela Kuti, 2002)
