= Thisisme Then: The Best of Common =

Greatest hits album by Common
- Released: November 27, 2007
- Genre: Hip-hop
- Length: 70:20
- Labels: Relativity; Legacy
- Producers: No I.D.; James Poyser; The Beatnuts; The Roots; Ynot; DRK; Spike Rebel

Common chronology
Finding Forever (2007)	Thisisme Then: The Best of Common (2007)	Universal Mind Control (2008)

Professional ratings
Review scores
Source	Rating
Pitchfork Media	(8.0/10)
PopMatters	(5/10)
RapReviews	(8/10)

Thisisme Then: The Best of Common is a compilation album by the American rapper Common, released November 27, 2007, on Relativity Records. It covers material from his early rap years, spanning 1992 to 1997, and contains singles from Common's first three albums as well as "High Expectations" from the Soul in the Hole soundtrack. The album's title is borrowed from the song "Thisisme", a track that was originally featured on Resurrection and that is featured on Thisisme Then. It was released on LP on January 8, 2008, six weeks after the CD release.

This album excludes his more recent material made during his membership in Soulquarians and his work with Jay Dee, later known as J Dilla.

== Track listing ==
#	Title	Length	Performer(s)	Producer(s)	Writers	Notes
1	"Take It EZ"	4:10	Common; Lenny Underwood (keyboards); Tony Orbach (saxophone)	2 pc. DRK	Lonnie Lynn	Contains samples from "Kissing My Love" by Al Jarreau; Contains samples from "Kool is Back" by Funk, Inc.; Contains samples from "When Will the Day Come" by Rasa; Contains samples from "A Crazy Mixed-Up World" by Sonny Stitt; Contains samples from "Breezin'" by George Benson; Contains samples from "Girls" by The Beastie Boys
2	"Breaker 1/9"	4:03	Common	Immenslope	Lonnie Lynn; O'Kelly Isley; Chris Jasper; Marvin Isley; Ronald Isley; Rudolph Isley	Contains samples from "Amen" by Rotary Connection; Contains samples from "Between the Sheets" by The Isley Brothers; Contains samples from "Get Out of My Life, Woman" by Lee Dorsey; Contains samples from "The Boogie Back" by Roy Ayers
3	"Soul by the Pound"	4:21	Common	Immenslope	Lonnie Lynn	Contains samples from "Feelin' It" by Ultramagnetic MC's; Contains samples from "A Chorus Line" by Ultramagnetic MCs (Vocals by Tim Dog); Contains samples from "Sneakin' in the Back" by Tom Scott; Contains samples from "I Like It" by DeBarge
4	"Charms Alarm"	4:31	Common	Immenslope	Lonnie Lynn	Contains samples from "Side by Side" by Earth, Wind & Fire; Contains samples from "Don't Change Your Love" by The Five Stairsteps; Contains samples from "Juicy Fruit" by Mtume
5	"Heidi Hoe"	4:31	Common	The Beatnuts	Lonnie Lynn	
6	"I Used to Love H.E.R."	4:40	Common	No I.D.	Lonnie Lynn	Contains sample from "The Changing World" as performed by George Benson
7	"Book of Life"	5:06	Common	No I.D.	Lonnie Lynn	Contains sample from "N.T." by Kool and the Gang; Contains sample from "Everybody Loves the Sunshine" as performed by Roy Ayers
8	"Resurrection"	3:48	Common	No I.D.	Lonnie Lynn	Contains sample from "The Signs Pt. II" as performed by David Axelrod; Contains sample from "Why Can't People Be Colors Too?" as performed by Whatnauts; Contains sample from "Help Is on the Way" as performed by Whatnauts; Contains sample from "Dolphin Dance" as performed by Ahmad Jamal; Contains sample from "Sorcerer of Isis" as performed by Power of Zeus; Contains sample from "Ice" as performed by Spirit
9	"Thisisme"	4:55	Common	No I.D.	Lonnie Lynn	Contains sample from "Build and Destroy" as performed by Boogie Down Productions; Contains sample from "Power of Love" as performed by Alton McClain & Destiny; Contains sample from "Momma Miss America" as performed by Wings
10	"Retrospect for Life"	5:24	Common; Lauryn Hill; Vere Isaacs (bass)	James Poyser; No I.D.	Lonnie Lynn; James Poyser; Ernest Wilson; Stevie Wonder; Syreeta Wright	Contains samples from "A Song for You" by Donny Hathaway; Contains samples from "Never Dreamed You'd Leave in Summer" by Stevie Wonder
11	"Reminding Me (Of Sef)"	4:56	Common; Chantay Savage; Spike Rebel (keyboards)	Ynot	Lonnie Lynn; Anthony Craig; Larry Brownee; Gus Redmond; Lowrell Simon; Fred Simon	Contains samples from "Reminding Me" by Patrice Rushen; Contains samples from "Mellow Mellow Right On" by Lowrell
12	"All Night Long"	5:48	Common; Erykah Badu	The Roots	Lonnie Lynn; James Poyser; Ahmir Thompson; E. Wright	Contains re-sung elements from "Don't Stop the Music" by Yarbrough and Peoples
13	"G.O.D. (Gaining One's Definition)"	4:48	Common; Cee Lo Green	No I.D. Spike Rebel	Lonnie Lynn; Thomas Burton; Cornell Newbill; Ernest Wilson	
14	"Stolen Moments, Pt. 3"	2:32	Common; Q-Tip	No I.D.	Lonnie Lynn; Ernest Wilson	Contains samples from "Superstition" by Melvin Van Peebles
15	"High Expectations"	6:47	Common	No I.D.	Lonnie Lynn; Ernest Wilson; Jerry Ragovoy; Aaron Schroeder	Contains samples from "Move Me No Mountain" by Chaka Khan
16	"Communism"	2:20	Common	No I.D.	No I.D.	Contains samples from "The Surest Things Can Change by Freddie Hubbard; Contains samples from "Knocking 'Round the Zoo" by James Taylor and The Flying Machine; Contains samples from "Brigitte: by Freddie Hubbard

== Chart positions ==
Chart (2007)	Peak position
U.S. Billboard Top R&B/Hip-Hop Albums	62
U.S. Billboard Top Rap Albums	23
U.S. Billboard Independent Albums	34
