= The Bitch in Yoo =

1996 song by Common

Single by Common

from the album Relativity Urban Assault
- B-side: "The Real Weight"
- Released: September 10, 1996
- Recorded: 1995
- Genre: Hip-hop
- Length: 4:00
- Label: Relativity
- Songwriters: Lonnie Lynn; Pete Phillips
- Producer: Pete Rock

Common singles chronology
"Resurrection" (1995)	"The Bitch in Yoo" (1996)	"Retrospect for Life" (1997)

"The Bitch in Yoo" is a song released by rapper Common in 1996. The song is a diss track towards rapper Ice Cube. The song first appeared on the Relativity Records compilation Relativity Urban Assault and later on Roc Raida's Crossfaderz. It was also performed live alongside De La Soul on their album Live at Tramps, NYC, 1996. The b-side of "The Bitch in Yoo" is "The Real Weight", a solo track by No I.D. The song has been deemed by The Ringer as one of the greatest diss tracks of all time and by Revolt as one of Pete Rock's most legendary beats.

== Overview ==
=== History ===
In Common's song "I Used to Love H.E.R.", the rapper partially blamed hip hop's change from pro-black music to street music on its domination by West Coast Gangsta rap. In particular, the line "I wasn't salty: she was with the boys in the hood" alluded to the film Boyz n the Hood (set in South Central, Los Angeles), a movie starring Ice Cube. This caused Ice Cube to diss Common in Mack 10's song "Westside Slaughterhouse". Common ignored it at first but then saw Ice Cube, Mack 10 and WC on BET dissing him to which Common then responded with his diss track "The Bitch in Yoo." Ice Cube then dissed Common in Westside Connection's song "Hoo-Bangin' (WSCG Style)".

=== Content ===
Over a beat produced by Pete Rock, Common responds to verbal attacks by Westside Connection and its lead rapper Ice Cube. He claims that Ice Cube has not released a "dope" album since AmeriKKKa's Most Wanted, that too many of Ice Cube's beats sample George Clinton songs, and that Cube took Common's lyrics from "I Used to Love H.E.R." out of context.

=== Samples ===
The song contains a sample from "Light My Fire" as performed by Julie Driscoll with Brian Auger and the Trinity. It also contains vocal samples of Raekwon from the track "Eye for a Eye (Your Beef Is Mines)" by Mobb Deep, and "Suspended in Time" by Group Home, as well as a scratched vocal sample from the song "A Bitch Iz A Bitch", by N.W.A. The end of the song incorporates a scratched vocal sample from the movie "The Five Heartbeats." The opening of the song is taken from the film "The Education of Sonny Carson" scene where a leader of The Hawks Gang proclaims their superiority over the rival Lords.

== Track listing ==
=== A-side ===
1. "The Bitch in Yoo (W/O Intro)" (3:46)
2. "The Bitch in Yoo (W/ Intro Flip)" (4:00)
3. "The Bitch in Yoo (Street Version)" (4:00)

=== B-side ===
1. "The Real Weight" (3:55)
2. "The Real Weight (Instrumental Version)" (3:55)
3. "The Bitch in Yoo (Instrumental Version)" (3:46)
