= Higher (Rihanna song) =

2016 song by Rihanna

Song by Rihanna

from the album Anti
- Released: 28 January 2016
- Recorded: 2015
- Studio: Westlake (Los Angeles)
- Length: 2:00
- Label: Westbury Road; Roc Nation
- Songwriters: Ernest Wilson; B. Bourelly; Robyn Fenty; Jerry Butler; Kenny Gamble; Leon Huff
- Producer: No I.D.

Audio video
- "Higher" on YouTube

"Higher" is a song by Barbadian singer Rihanna from her eighth studio album, Anti (2016).

== Production and composition ==
Rihanna previewed the song on Instagram in early March 2015. The song was by written Ernest Wilson (No I.D.), B. Bourelly, Rihanna, Jerry Butler, Kenny Gamble and Leon Huff. No I.D., also produced the song which samples contains elements from "Beside You" performed by The Soulful Strings. American producer Kuk Harrell handled the song's vocal production. "Higher" was recorded at Westlake Studios in Los Angeles. The vocal recording was carried out by Marcos Tovar for Allfadersup and Harrell. The song was finally mixed by Manny Marroquin at Larrabee Studios in North Hollywood, along with mixing assistants Chris Galland and Ike Schultz, before being mastered by Chris Gehringer at Sterling Sound, in New York City.

The ballad is two minutes long. NME's Jordan Bassett called "Higher" a "straight-up love song", and Brittany Spanos of Rolling Stone described the song as "bluesy". The Independent's Emily Jupp described "Higher" as an "Amy Winehouse-inspired number", and Nolan Feeney of Time called the song a "whiskey-soaked come-hither".

== Critical reception ==
"Higher" received positive reviews from music critics. Billboard's Julianne Escobedo Shepherd wrote, "The vocal on the last-call ballad 'Higher,' which seems to be an early fan favorite, is far less effective, however: Rihanna strains into the high register as she sings from the perspective of a burdened doyenne halfway through a drunk dial; what she means as an emotional effect teeters too far off-pitch (evidence on its own that inebriated voicemails are never a good idea)." Consequence of Sound's David Sackllah called the song "thunderous", with Rihanna "[pushing] her vocal prowess past its breaking point, packing an album’s worth of stunning moments into two minutes".

Jordan Bassett of NME said, "There's tinkling piano and elegiac piano, but what really stands out is Rihanna's smoking, soaring vocal, which might be one of those most beautiful and romantic things she's put to record." In his review of Anti, Michael Cragg of The Guardian wrote, "'Higher' is the point where Rihanna's new experimental vocal tone goes a bit haywire. It's actually almost unlistenable, which is a shame because the musical waltz straining to be heard in the background is really pretty." Contrastingly, the newspaper's Alexis Petridis said the song's "combination of slurred vocal and woozy music sounds amazing, like an epic 60s tearjerker performed by people who've overindulged so much they're either on the verge of passing out, or being sick in a bin".

Pitchfork's Jayson Greene said the song was "yet another masterful piece of work from No I.D.", and wrote: "We’ve met a lot of Rihannas over the years, but 'Higher' ... is the first appearance of 'last call Rihanna'—a drunk-dialer with a ruined voice box, an insatiable burning in their loins, and an alarming lack of interest in maintaining dignity. This is a song about the desire for late-night sex and companionship so urgent that it actually feels like a song about how much it hurts to have a Humvee back over your leg. And that is because Rihanna gives so much of herself in the vocal booth that it feels like she might pass out... This song is two minutes long, but it is a complete transmission from someplace more louche and heartbroken and painful than our world." Spin's Brennan Carley compared the song to "At Last", while Eve Barlow said the song was "a tad shout-y".

Teen Vogue's Crissy Milazzo wrote, "At Rihanna's most Amy Winehouse moment, she sings about whiskey and ashtrays, letting you hear the wear-and-tear on her voice for a brief two minutes. This one is a must-listen, as it feels like an Adele deep cut with Rih's trademark bad girl edge. It's both sad and hopeful, triumphant and defeated. Strings add to the drama, giving you the emotion that's usually only reserved for Rihanna's social media. Most of all, it's honest, it's refreshing, and it's a win on an album that feels all her own." USA Today's Maeve McDermott and Patrick Ryan said the song was "a finger in the eye" to "Love on the Brain", the preceding track on the album, "as Rihanna ditches the pretty vibrato to sing-shout some late-night come-ons in the most BadGalRiRi moment on the record." Caroline Framke of Vox wrote, "'Higher' is just two minutes long, but Rihanna's raw longing is scorching. It goes from a beguiling, 'This whiskey got me feeling pretty,' to Rihanna throwing herself into the sloppier mess of just wanting to be with someone, and fast... Never has a drunk dial been this convincing — or this powerfully moving."

== Legacy ==
"Higher" inspired the song "Liability" from New Zealand singer-songwriter Lorde's second album Melodrama (2017), when Lorde was reportedly "moved to tears" listening to "Higher" and this helped her to write "Liability".

In 2020, the track was later sampled in "Flux Capacitor" by Jay Electronica from his debut album A Written Testimony, featuring vocals from Jay-Z.

American singer-songwriter Maren Morris shared an acoustic cover of the song online in 2016.

== Charts ==
Chart (2016–17)	Peak position
France (SNEP)	185
Sweden Heatseeker (Sverigetopplistan)	8

== Certifications ==
Region	Certification	Certified units/sales
New Zealand (RMNZ)	Gold	15,000^{‡}
United States (RIAA)	Platinum	1,000,000^{‡}
^{‡} Sales+streaming figures based on certification alone.

== See also ==
- No I.D. production discography
