= Reminding Me (Of Sef) =

Single by Common featuring Chantay Savage

from the album One Day It'll All Make Sense
- Released: August 5, 1997
- Genre: Chicago hip-hop
- Length: 4:55
- Label: Relativity
- Songwriters: Lonnie Lynn; Anthony Craig
- Producer: Ynot

Common singles chronology
"Retrospect for Life" (1997)	"Reminding Me (Of Sef)" (1997)	"All Night Long" (1998)

Chantay Savage singles chronology
"Baby: Drive Me Crazy" (1996)	"Reminding Me (Of Sef)" (1997)	"Come Around" (1999)

Music video
- "Reminding Me (Of Sef)" on YouTube

"Reminding Me (Of Sef)" is the second single from rapper Common's third album One Day It'll All Make Sense. It features vocals from Chantay Savage and keyboards played by Spike Rebel. Its Ynot-produced beat samples "Mellow Mellow Right On" by Lowrell and "Remind Me" by Patrice Rushen. A music video directed by Darren Grant was made for the song.

== Track listing ==
=== US version ===
==== A-side ====
1. "Reminding Me (Of Sef) (radio edit)" (4:20)
2. "Reminding Me (Of Sef) (Album Version)" (4:57)
3. "Reminding Me (Of Sef) (instrumental)" (4:56)\

==== B-side ====
1. "1'2 Many... (radio version)" (3:15)
2. "1'2 Many... (Album Version)" (3:15)
3. "Reminding Me (Of Sef) (Acapella)" (4:53)

=== International version ===
==== A-side ====
1. "Reminding Me (Of Sef) - Album Version"
2. "Reminding Me (Of Sef) - The Roots Remix"

"Reminding Me (Of Sef)" international version single cover and vinyl record

==== B-Side ====
1. "1'2 Many... (Album Version)"
2. "I Used to Love H.E.R."

== Chart positions ==
Chart (1997)	Peak position
U.S. Billboard Bubbling Under Hot 100 Singles	1
U.S. Billboard Hot R&B/Hip-Hop Singles & Tracks	57
U.S. Billboard Hot Rap Singles	9
UK Singles Chart	59

== See also ==
- List of Common songs
