= Car Horn (song) =

1999 single by Common and DJ Mark the 45 King

Single by Common featuring Mark the 45 King
- Released: May 10, 1999
- Genre: Underground hip-hop
- Length: 3:18
- Label: Groove Attack Productions
- Songwriters: Lonnie Lynn; Mark James
- Producer: Mark the 45 King

Common singles chronology
"One-Nine-Nine-Nine" (1999)	"Car Horn" (1999)	"Hurricane" (1999)

"Car Horn" is a non-album single by rapper Common and producer Mark the 45 King. Released in 1999 by Groove Attack Productions, the song features free-associative battle raps.

It was remixed by Madlib for Common's white label release Common Remixes.

== See also ==
- List of Common songs
