= Accept Your Own and Be Yourself (The Black Album) =

Accept Your Own & Be Yourself (The Black Album)

Studio album by No I.D.
- Released: September 23, 1997
- Recorded: 1996–1997
- Genre: Chicago hip hop
- Length: 45:26
- Label: Relativity
- Producer: No I.D.; Dug Infinite; Spike Rebel

No I.D. chronology
Accept Your Own & Be Yourself (The Black Album) (1997)	The Sampler Vol. 1 (2002)

Professional ratings
Review scores
Source	Rating
AllMusic	2/5 stars
The Source	3.5/5 stars

Accept Your Own and Be Yourself (The Black Album) is the only album released under producer No I.D.'s name. It was put out by Relativity Records in 1997.

Production is done entirely by him, except "Original Man" (co-produced by Dug Infinite), "Sky's the Limit (Inf Mix)" (produced by Dug Infinite) and "Sky's the Limit" (co-produced by Spike Rebel). He raps on most of the tracks; Dug Infinite is also featured on most of them. Common and Syndicate also make appearances.

== Track listing ==
#	Title	Songwriters	Producer(s)	Performer (s)
1	"Heat"		No I.D.	*Interlude*
2	"We Rock Like So"	D. Wilson, D. Thomas	No I.D.	Dug Infinite, No I.D.
3	"Fate or Destiny"	D. Wilson, D. Thomas, L. Harland	No I.D.	Dug Infinite, No I.D., Infamous Syndicate
4	"State to State"	D. Wilson, D. Thomas, J. Simmons, D. McDaniels, R. Rubin	No I.D.	Common, Dug Infinite, No I.D.
5	"I'm Thinkin'"		No I.D.	*Interlude*
6	"Mega Live (That's the Joint)"	D. Wilson, D. Thomas, J. Davis, N. Jones, E. Klugh, D. McDaniels, J. Olivier, A. Shaheed, T. Smith, M. Taylor, R. Guy	No I.D.	Dug Infinite, No I.D., Shawnna
7	"Sky's the Limit [Inf Mix]"	D. Wilson, D. Thomas	Dug Infinite	No I.D.
8	"Dreams"		No I.D.	*Interlude*
9	"The Real Weight"	D. Wilson, D. Thomas	No I.D.	Dug Infinite, No I.D.
10	"Jump on It"	D. Wilson, D. Thomas	No I.D.	Dug Infinite, No I.D.
11	"Gem"	L. Harland	No I.D.	Infamous Syndicate
12	"Original Man"	D. Wilson, D. Thomas	No I.D., Dug Infinite (co-producer)	Dug Infinite, No I.D.
13	"Pray for the Sinners"	D. Wilson, D. Thomas, S. Wonder	No I.D.	Dug Infinite, No I.D.
14	"Sky's the Limit"	D. Wilson, D. Thomas, C. Newbill	No I.D., Spike Rebel (co-producer)	Dug Infinite, No I.D.
15	"Two Steps Behind"	D. Wilson, D. Thomas, L. Harland	No I.D.	Dug Infinite, No I.D., Infamous Syndicate

== Samples ==
- "State To State"
  - "The School Boy" by David Axelrod
  - "My Adidas" by Run DMC
- "Mega Live (That's the Joint)"
  - "You're Welcome, Stop on By" by Ahmad Jamal
  - "Suspect" by Nas
  - "1,2 Sh*t" by A Tribe Called Quest
- "Pray for the Sinners"
  - "Take A Little Trip" by Minnie Riperton
- "Fate or Destiny"
  - "Merlin's Prophecy" by David Axelrod
- "Gem"
  - "Aire" by Chicago
- "Sky's The Limit (Inf Mix)"
  - "Anya" by Richard Rodney Bennett
  - "Keep On" by D-Train
- "The Real Weight"
  - "Woman of the Ghetto" by Marlena Shaw
  - "Bumpin' Bus Stop" by Thunder and Lightning
- "Two Steps Behind"
  - "Don't Let Up" by Olympic Runners

== Album singles ==
Single cover	Single information
	"Sky's the Limit": Released: 1997; B-side: "Jump on It"

== Charts ==
Chart (1997)	Peak position
US Top R&B/Hip Hop Albums (Billboard)	94
