= Take It EZ =

Single by Common Sense

from the album Can I Borrow a Dollar?
- B-side: "Soul by the Pound"
- Released: September 4, 1992
- Recorded: 1991
- Studio: New York City Recording Studios
- Genre: Hip-hop
- Length: 4:08
- Label: Relativity Records
- Songwriters: Lonnie Lynn, Andrew Jay Marks, London C McDaniels, Dion Wilson, Tony Craig
- Producers: 2 pc. DRK (No I.D., The Twilite Tone)

Common Sense singles chronology
"Take It EZ" (1992)	"Breaker 1/9" (1992)

"Take It EZ" is the debut single by Chicago rapper Common (then known as Common Sense) from his debut album Can I Borrow a Dollar?. It is produced by 2 pc. DRK, a production team made up of Immenslope and The Twilite Tone. The song's beat mixes keyboards and saxophone playing by Lenny Underwood and Tony Orbach respectively, as well as a sample from "When Will the Day Come" by Rasa. Its beat anticipates the soulful production from Common's second album, Resurrection. It reached #5 on the Hot Rap Singles chart making it the most popular single from Common's debut album. Stanton Swihart of Allmusic considers it to be a standout track on the album.

== Track listing ==
=== A-side ===
1. "Take It EZ" (4:08)
2. "Take It EZ (Instrumental)" (4:08)

=== B-side ===
1. "Take It EZ (Jazz Instrumental)" (4:08)
2. "Soul by the Pound" (4:20)

== Chart positions ==
Chart (1992)	Peak position
U.S. Billboard Hot Rap Singles	5

== See also ==
- List of Common songs
