= One-Nine-Nine-Nine =

Single by Common featuring Sadat X and Talib Kweli

from the album Soundbombing II
- B-side: "Like They Used to Say"
- Released: March 24, 1999
- Genre: Underground hip-hop
- Length: 4:10
- Label: Rawkus
- Songwriters: Lonnie Lynn; Derek Murphy; Tony Cottrell
- Producers: Hi-Tek; Dug Infinite

Common singles chronology
"Respiration" (1999)	"One-Nine-Nine-Nine" (1999)	"Car Horn" (1999)

Sadat X singles chronology
"Everything But Love" (1997)	"One-Nine-Nine-Nine" (1999)	"Ka-Ching" (2000)

Talib Kweli singles chronology
"Another World (Remix)" (1999)	"One-Nine-Nine-Nine" (1999)	"The Hard Margin" (1999)

"One-Nine-Nine-Nine"/"Like They Used to Say" is a double A-Side single by rapper Common. "One-Nine-Nine-Nine" is featured on Soundbombing II, a compilation album by Rawkus Records released in 1999. The song features an introduction by Talib Kweli, guest rapping by Sadat X and production by Hi-Tek. A music video was released for it, which also featured briefs cameos from Jeru The Damaja and Harold Hunter. Additionally, Rawkus Records featured it in their Best of Decade I: 1995-2005 compilation. Common's vocals on the song were sampled in "Mic Like a Memory" by Cunninlynguists.

"Like They Used to Say" was produced by Dug Infinite, who also worked on Common's first three albums. In the song, Common talks about the days of old and comments on where he sees hip-hop heading in the future.

== Track listing ==
=== A-side ===
1. "One-Nine-Nine-Nine (Radio Version)" (4:16)
2. "One-Nine-Nine-Nine (Street Version)" (4:16)
3. "One-Nine-Nine-Nine (Instrumental Version)" (4:16)
4. "One-Nine-Nine-Nine (A Capella)" (3:40)

=== AA-side ===
1. "Like They Used to Say (Radio Version)" (4:32)
2. "Like They Used to Say (Street Version)" (4:31)
3. "Like They Used to Say (Instrumental Version)" (4:19)
4. "Like They Used to Say (A Capella)" (3:23)

== See also ==
- List of Common songs
