= Majic Massey =

American singer-songwriter

- Born: Floyd Massey
- Origin: Chicago, Illinois, United States
- Genres: Hip hop, R&B
- Occupations: Singer, songwriter
- Years active: 1998–present
- Labels: UpFront; Konvict; Plugged; SRC; Universal Motown
- Website: MyspaceMajic's Blog

Majic Massey (born Floyd Massey) is an American singer from Chicago.

== Early life ==
In high school, Massey was winning enough talent shows to land a recording deal with Undeniable Records (run by Major League Baseball legend Frank Thomas) before he graduated. Despite a number of personal setbacks (friends dying, the label folding), Massey was determined to establish his recording career. Through hard work and personal connections, Majic was able to work with fellow Chicago native and producer No ID, who has worked with artists such as Common and Kanye West, as well as Swizz Beatz, who has worked with Jay-Z and DMX.

== SRC/Universal ==
Steve Rifkind's SRC/Universal recognized his strong work ethic, and more importantly his talent, and signed Massey to a recording deal in 2005. Rifkind connected Majic with DeVyne Stephens, who has helped develop the careers of superstars including Usher, Mariah Carey and Akon. Massey now splits time between Chicago and Atlanta, the latter being home base to Stephens’ management company UpFront Megatainment.

== Love D.N.A. ==
In 2011, Massey released the album Love D.N.A. In talking about the album, he said, "My definition for Love D.N.A is baby-making music. It's the blueprint to making love." Love D.N.A is heavily inspired by his hometown of Chicago. "Chicago is known for slick talkers, pimps…[and] it's very religious," Majic stated. "You can go from looking up to a lady's man, or … you can look up to a pastor. I chose to incorporate it all in my music. When you listen to my music you’re feeling the Midwest, anyone from New York to Atlanta to California and beyond can feel what I’m saying."

Love D.N.A. has contributions from established producers including Swizz Beatz and Scott Storch as well as newcomers Chris Henderson (Jamie Foxx's "Blame It") and Lil Ronnie (R. Kelly "Same Girl"). Twista was also featured in Love D.N.A. on Massey's single "I Want Her", which was the No. 1 requested single added to Urban radio.

== Albums ==
- 2011: Love D.N.A.
- 2017: All Around
