= Nobody's Smiling =

Studio album by Common
- Released: July 22, 2014
- Recorded: 2013–2014
- Genre: Hip-hop
- Length: 41:32
- Labels: ARTium; Def Jam
- Producers: No I.D. (also exec.); Common (co-exec.); Mike Chavez (co-exec.)

Common chronology
The Dreamer/The Believer (2011)	Nobody's Smiling (2014)	Black America Again (2016)

Singles from Nobody's Smiling
- 1. "Kingdom" Released: May 27, 2014; 2. "Speak My Piece" Released: June 30, 2014; 3. "Diamonds" Released: July 8, 2014

Nobody's Smiling is the tenth studio album by American hip-hop recording artist Common. It was released on July 22, 2014, by Def Jam Recordings and No I.D.'s label ARTium Records. Following the release of his 2011's album The Dreamer/The Believer, Common took a hiatus from musical endeavors. In 2013, he returned to the studio and began working his tenth album and later revealed that the production, much like his previous effort, would be handled entirely by his longtime collaborator and record producer No I.D. In 2014, Common signed a recording contract with No I.D.'s ARTium Records, through Def Jam Recordings, for the distribution of the album.

The title and concept of the album was inspired by the violence and high crime rate in Common's hometown of Chicago, Illinois. The album features guest appearances from G Herbo (formerly known as Lil Herb), Big Sean, Jhené Aiko, Snoh Aalegra, Dreezy, Elijah Blake, Vince Staples and Cocaine 80s. The album was supported by three singles: "Kingdom" featuring Vince Staples, "Speak My Piece" and "Diamonds" featuring Big Sean.

== Background ==
In 2012, Common announced that he would release an extended play (EP) in January 2013, and his first mixtape in April. In February 2013, Common announced his tenth solo studio album would be released in September 2013 and will feature Kanye West, as well as production from West and No I.D. Later on September 8, 2013, he gave an update to his projects saying the previously announced EP would be released soon, and would feature a song with new Def Jam signee Vince Staples. He also told HipHopDX, his tenth solo studio album would now be released in early 2014.

On January 6, 2014, Common announced the title of his tenth studio album to be Nobody Smiling and revealed it would be produced entirely by his longtime collaborator No I.D.. Common also revealed the album would feature Vince Staples, James Fauntleroy and "some new artists from Chicago." The concept of the album was inspired by his troubled hometown of Chicago: "We came up with this concept 'nobody's smiling.' It was really a thought that came about because of all the violence in Chicago," he says. "It happens in Chicago, but it's happening around the world in many ways." He continues, "We was talking about the conditions of what's happening, when I say 'nobody's smiling.' But it's really a call to action." On June 4, 2014, it was announced Common signed a recording contract with Def Jam Recordings and No I.D.'s ARTium Records. It was also announced that Nobody Smiling would be released July 22, 2014.

On June 25, 2014, the concept behind the album was revealed along with two album covers, one which features Common scowling, while the other one features the faces of two up-and-coming Chicago-based rappers Lil Herb and King L. According to Common, he saw his album cover as “a way to give back” and bring attention to artists who may not be as well known outside of Chicago. He also added that those featured on his album cover art were grateful and curious as to why he chose to include them: “For me those covers, putting Lil Herb, putting Dreezy, putting Lil Bibby. Some people don’t know about them. I know about them and the Chi know about em. And it’s some people in the world that know about em. You see em on certain Hip Hop avenues, but everybody don’t know about em. And for me putting em on my album cover is a way to give back. Saying ‘Look, we are all one in [sic] the same.’ You know what I’m saying? ‘I see y’all I see me. So, that’s why I’m putting y’all on my cover.’ I don’t need to be on the cover. I ain’t even in my first video…I asked em. I called them. I was like ‘Man, I want y’all to be on the cover of the album.’ And they all came to this hotel room and we took the pictures…King Louie was grateful. Cats was grateful. They also was getting like—Trying to understand ‘Man, what Common on?’ Cause they didn’t know me that well.”

== Release and promotion ==
In April 2013, Common released a song, titled "Congratulations" featuring Cocaine 80s, a supergroup, consists himself, No I.D. and several other artists. In March 2014, Common was featured on a mixtape, titled Catch the Throne, which was presented by HBO, in promotion for the new season of their show Game of Thrones. In May 2014, before he released his new single "Kingdom", Common released a minute-long trailer for the forthcoming Hype Williams-directed video. On June 4, 2014, Common announced the album would be released on July 22, 2014. On June 25, 2014, Common unveiled the album's artwork and two days later released the album's track-listing. Common continued his promo run with a sit down with Hard Knock TV. During the interview he spoke on the concept behind his tenth studio album, working with Vince Staples, why the track he and Chance the Rapper made didn't make the final cut, "Chi-raq" and the efforts he and fellow Chicago-bred rappers (Twista, Rhymefest, Lupe Fiasco, Kanye West) are making to improve life in Chicago. In July 2014, in an interview on The Combat Jack Show, Common revisits his days growing up in Chicago, being inspired by Michael Jordan, house music, Chicago mayor Harold Washington, Rev. Jeremiah Wright and how this album addresses the current plight of black on black crime in Chicago.

=== Singles ===
The album's first single, titled "Kingdom", features his fellow new Def Jam label-mate Vince Staples and was released to iTunes on May 27, 2014. The 7-minute music video for the song was uploaded on Vevo on June 21, 2014. It was shot on location in Common’s hometown, Chicago and Galesburg, Illinois and was directed entirely by Hype Williams (with whom Common previously worked with on Universal Mind Control in 2008). A remix of "Kingdom", featuring a new verse from Jay Electronica, was released on September 24, 2014.

The second single, titled "Speak My Piece", was released via digital distribution on June 30, 2014. On July 8, 2014, "Diamonds", featuring Common's former GOOD Music label-mate Big Sean, was released as the album's third single.

== Critical reception ==
Professional ratings
Aggregate scores
Source	Rating
Metacritic	78/100
Review scores
Source	Rating
AllMusic	4/5 stars
The A.V. Club	C+
Consequence of Sound	B
Exclaim!	8/10
The Guardian	4/5 stars
HipHopDX	4.5/5 stars
Pitchfork	7.7/10
PopMatters	6/10
Rolling Stone	3.5/5 stars
XXL	4/5 stars

Nobody's Smiling was met with generally positive reviews from music critics. At Metacritic, which assigns a normalized rating out of 100 to reviews from critics, the album received an average score of 78, which indicates "generally positive reviews", based on 21 reviews. Andy Kellman of AllMusic said, "While Nobody's Smiling was inspired by the tragic condition of Common's hometown of Chicago, its incorporation of a relevant-as-ever song from 1970, recorded by a Chicagoan in Chicago, is an acknowledgment of how inner-city struggles are a constant, not a trend. The rapper/actor's geographic and economic distance can be cited as a reason to approach Nobody's Smiling with a cocked brow." Jay Balfour of HipHopDX stated, "Nobody’s Smiling is defiant, as full of commanding musicality as it is of Common’s own provocation. Of his recent output, it deserves to be the most touted since that 2005 darling. It’s one of his best since he started, and like the album itself does about Chicago’s current crisis, that says plenty." Del F. Cowie of Exclaim! said, 'While not flawlessly executed, Common arguably regains some of the relevance he may have lost from his last couple of albums with the focus of Nobody's Smiling." Stephen F. Kearse of Paste said, "In the end, Common is just too good of a rapper: he is most poignant when he is rapping and writing about himself. This is both a badge that he has earned and one that he wears quite well, but on Nobody’s Smiling it works against him. He set out to depict the pains of contemporary Chicago, but he ended up just making another Common album."

Simon Vozick-Levinson of Rolling Stone said, "Nobody's Smiling, again produced by old Chi-town friend No I.D., features plenty of younger artists – check rising Cali rapper Vince Staples' blunted musings on the gospel-laced "Kingdom." More important, it has some of Com's tightest storytelling in years. If the bittersweet memory-lane stroll he takes on "Rewind That" doesn't move you even a little, you might be heartless." Reed Jackson of XXL stated, "But not all of Nobody’s Smiling is stony-faced and grim. Beyond its important purpose amid the violence, it's also a chance for Common to look back once again at the place that birthed him. That means nostalgia often shines through in his lyrics, especially on the heartfelt "Rewind That," which serves as a tribute to his late great friend and old roommate J. Dilla, as well as No I.D. and Twilite Tone, another producer that helped him get his start. On it, he rhymes, “For the future of the, Chi we gon’ bring it back home.” One thing that we’ve learned from Common over the years is that, even with its flaws, there’s no place like home." Sheldon Pearce of Consequence of Sound said, "Nobody's Smiling is a well-rounded discourse on gang violence and inner city plight in Chicago that translates to almost every urban city in America. It is a triumph for conscious rap in a city that could use more self-awareness. Common continues to act as the voice of his city, further opening the dialogue on the problems that scourge it. Nobody’s Smiling is a warning. Hopefully, it wont be a eulogy."

== Commercial performance ==
The album debuted at number six on the Billboard 200, selling 24,000 copies in its opening week giving Common his third top ten on the chart and his highest-charting album since Finding Forever debuted at number one in 2007. In its second week, the album dropped to number 29, selling 8,000 copies. In its third week, the album dropped to number 56, selling 4,978 copies, bringing its total album sales to 37,581 copies. The album has sold 64,000 copies in the United States as of November 2016.

== Track listing ==
All tracks produced by No ID, except "Kingdom" co-produced by James Poyser.

No.	Title	Writer(s)	Length
1.	"The Neighborhood" (featuring Lil Herb and Cocaine 80s)	Lonnie Lynn; Ernest Wilson; Herbert Wright; James Fauntleroy; Curtis Mayfield	3:58
2.	"No Fear"	Lynn; Wilson	3:12
3.	"Diamonds" (featuring Big Sean)	Lynn; Wilson; Sean Anderson	3:53
4.	"Blak Majik" (featuring Jhené Aiko)	Lynn; Wilson; James Poyser; Jhené Chilombo	3:19
5.	"Speak My Piece"	Lynn; Wilson; Randy Alpert; Deric Angelettie; Andy Armer; Sean Combs; Ron Lawrence; Christopher Wallace	3:51
6.	"Hustle Harder" (featuring Snoh Aalegra and Dreezy)	Lynn; Wilson; Snoh Nowrozi; Seandrea Sledge; Alexander Izquierdo; Kirby Dockery; Leon Michels	3:58
7.	"Nobody’s Smiling" (featuring Malik Yusef)	Lynn; Wilson; Malik Jones	4:16
8.	"Real" (featuring Elijah Blake)	Lynn; Wilson; Steve Wyreman; Sean Fenton; Oliver Scott; Ronald Wilson	3:22
9.	"Kingdom" (featuring Vince Staples)	Lynn; Wilson; Vince Staples; Poyser; Ernest Fowler	6:22
10.	"Rewind That"	Lynn; Wilson; Poyser; Thomas Keith	5:21
Total length:			41:32

Deluxe edition (bonus tracks)
No.	Title	Writer(s)	Length
11.	"Out on Bond" (featuring Vince Staples)	Lynn; Wilson; Staples; Adrian Younge; Wyreman	3:25
12.	"7 Deadly Sins"	Lynn; Wilson; Younge	3:08
13.	"Young Hearts Run Free" (featuring Cocaine 80s)	Lynn; Wilson; Fauntleroy	4:33
Total length:			52:38

Target deluxe edition bonus track
No.	Title	Writer(s)	Length
14.	"City to City"	Lynn; Wilson	2:27
Total length:			55:05

Sample credits

- "The Neighborhood" contains a sample of "The Other Side of Town" performed by Curtis Mayfield.
- "Kingdom" contains a sample of "O Yes My Lord" performed by Voices of Conquest, and "Is There Any Love" performed by Trevor Dandy.
- "Hustle Harder" contains a sample of "Nightbird" performed by The Fabulous Three.
- "Speak My Piece" contains a sample of "Hypnotize" performed by The Notorious B.I.G.
- "Real" contains an interpolation of "Yearning For Your Love", written by Oliver Scott and Ronald Wilson.
- "Rewind That" contains a sample of "Telegram" performed by Eleanore Mills, and contains sample of "Still Shining" from J Dilla's Documentary, and J Dilla's vocal sample courtesy of Madukes.
- "Out on Bond" contains a sample of "Turn Down the Sound" performed by Adrian Younge.
- "7 Deadly Sins" contains a sample of "It's Me" performed by Adrian Younge.
- "City to City" contains a sample from "Fever" performed by Jingo

== Charts ==
=== Weekly charts ===
Chart (2014)	Peak position
UK Albums Chart	138
UK R&B and Hip-Hop Albums (OCC)	12
US Billboard 200	6
US Top R&B/Hip-Hop Albums (Billboard)	1

=== Year-end charts ===
Chart (2014)	Position
US Top R&B/Hip-Hop Albums (Billboard)	63
