= One Day It'll All Make Sense =

Studio album by Common
- Released: September 30, 1997
- Recorded: 1995–1997
- Studio: Streeterville (Chicago)
- Genre: Midwestern hip-hop
- Length: 70:10
- Label: Relativity
- Producers: No I.D.; Spike Rebel; Karriem Riggins; James Poyser; the Twilite Tone; Dug Infinite

Common chronology
Resurrection (1994)	One Day It'll All Make Sense (1997)	Like Water for Chocolate (2000)

Singles from One Day It'll All Make Sense
- 1. "Retrospect for Life" Released: July 29, 1997; 2. "Reminding Me (Of Sef)" Released: August 5, 1997; 3. "All Night Long" Released: January 25, 1998

One Day It'll All Make Sense is the third studio album by rapper Common, released on September 30, 1997, on Relativity Records. It was the follow-up to his critically acclaimed album Resurrection and the last Common album to feature producer No I.D. until Common's 2011 album The Dreamer/The Believer. It was also the first album in which Common officially dropped Sense from his name.

== Critical reception ==
Professional ratings
Review scores
Source	Rating
AllMusic	4/5 stars
The Austin Chronicle	3.5/5 stars
Chicago Tribune	3.5/4 stars
The Independent	4/5 stars
NME	8/10
Rolling Stone	4/5 stars
The Rolling Stone Album Guide	3.5/5 stars
The Source	3.5/5 stars
Spin	8/10
The Village Voice	B+

Reviewing for The Village Voice in January 1998, Robert Christgau wrote of the album:

With no notable penchant for ear candy or mass ass appeal, this Chicago rhymer carves out an unpretentious artistic space that couldn't have existed before hip hop – no singer-songwriter's everyday ruminations come near such social content or physical form. Common raps about black life as most black people live it and black manhood as most young black men grow into it, and while his flow isn't primed for the dance floor, it's complex and full-bodied in a way few, you know, white artists could imitate, much less make up. Nor is that the only way he's complex--guy spends considerable time dancing in his head.

== Track listing ==
#	Title	Length	Performer(s)	Songwriters	Producer(s)
1	"Introspective"	1:36	Common	Lonnie Lynn; Ernest Wilson	No I.D.
2	"Invocation"	2:14	Common	Lonnie Lynn; Ernest Wilson	No I.D.
3	"Real Nigga Quotes"	5:24	Common	Lonnie Lynn; Doug Thomas	Dug Infinite
4	"Retrospect for Life"	6:23	Common; Lauryn Hill; Vere Isaacs (bass)	Lonnie Lynn; James Poyser; Ernest Wilson; Stevie Wonder; Syreeta Wright	James Poyser; No I.D.
5	"Gettin' Down at the Amphitheater"	5:18	Common; De La Soul (Posdnuos and Trugoy)	Lonnie Lynn; David Jolicoeur; Kelvin Mercer; Ernest Wilson	No I.D.
6	"Food for Funk"	4:10	Common	Lonnie Lynn; Ernest Wilson	No I.D.
7	"G.O.D. (Gaining One's Definition)"	4:47	Cee-Lo; Common	Lonnie Lynn; Ernest Wilson; Cornell Newhill; Thomas Burton	No I.D. Spike Rebel
8	"My City"	5:07	Common; Malik Yusef; Alvin Rogers (saxophone); Demetrions Kelly (bass)	Malik Yusef; Cornell Newhill	Spike Rebel
9	"Hungry"	2:33	Common	Lonnie Lynn; Ernest Wilson	No I.D.
10	"All Night Long"	7:35	Common; Erykah Badu	Lonnie Lynn; James Poyser; Erykah Badu; Ahmir Thompson	The Roots
11	"Stolen Moments, Pt. 1"	2:02	Common	Lonnie Lynn; Ernest Wilson	No I.D.
12	"Stolen Moments, Pt. 2"	2:57	Black Thought; Common	Lonnie Lynn; Ernest Wilson	No I.D.
13	"1'2 Many..."	3:12	Common	Lonnie Lynn; Doug Thomas	Dug Infinite
14	"Stolen Moments, Pt. 3"	3:13	Common; Q-Tip	Lonnie Lynn; Ernest Wilson	No I.D.
15	"Making a Name for Ourselves"	4:53	Canibus; Common	Lonnie Lynn; Germaine Williams	No I.D.
16	"Reminding Me (Of Sef)"	4:55	Chantay Savage; Common; Spike Rebel (keyboards)	Lonnie Lynn; Anthony Craig	The Twilite Tone
17	"Pop's Rap, Pt. 2 / Fatherhood"	3:49	Common; Lonnie "Pops" Lynn; Alan Jay Palmer (piano); Billy Johnson (bass); Karriem Riggins (drums)	Lonnie Lynn; Karriem Riggins	Karriem Riggins

== Charts ==
Year	Album	Chart positions	
Year	Album	Billboard 200	Top R&B/Hip-Hop Albums
1997	One Day It'll All Make Sense	62	12

=== Singles ===
Year	Song	Chart positions		
Year	Song	Hot R&B/Hip-Hop Singles & Tracks	Hot Rap Singles	Hot Dance Music/Maxi-Singles Sales
1997	"Reminding Me (Of Sef)"	57	9	21
