= Can I Borrow a Dollar? =

1992 studio album by Common Sense

Studio album by Common Sense
- Released: October 6, 1992
- Recorded: 1991–92
- Genre: Hip-hop
- Length: 49:34
- Label: Relativity
- Producers: Peter Kang; Immenslope; the Beatnuts; the Twilite Tone

Common Sense chronology
Can I Borrow a Dollar? (1992)	Resurrection (1994)

Singles from Can I Borrow a Dollar?
- 1. "Take It EZ" Released: September 4, 1992; 2. "Breaker 1/9" Released: January 12, 1993; 3. "Soul by the Pound" Released: July 13, 1993

Can I Borrow a Dollar? is the debut studio album by American rapper Common (then known as Common Sense). It was released on October 6, 1992, by Relativity Records. The album was produced by No I.D. (then called Immenslope) and the Twilite Tone, with additional production by the Beatnuts, and includes guest vocals from Immenslope, Miss Jones and Common's then-girlfriend Rayshel.

== Overview ==
=== Background ===
In 1991, a feature was written about Common in the Unsigned Hype section of The Source. Relativity Records soon signed Common, and prepared to release three singles for his debut album. The first and best-charting single was 1992's "Take It EZ". It reached #5 on the Hot Rap Singles chart while his next two singles, "Breaker 1/9" and "Soul by the Pound," reached #10 and #7 respectively. All of these singles combined to give Common a strong underground reputation prior to the album's release.

=== Content ===
Can I Borrow A Dollar? shows Common's early style of rapping; namely a sing-songy and inflection-heavy vocal delivery, as well as lyrics packed with word play and popular culture allusions. The album's production, utilizing samples, keyboards, and drum breaks prominently, tends to be minimalistic, jazzy and laid back.

== Critical reception ==
Professional ratings
Review scores
Source	Rating
AllMusic	3/5 stars
RapReviews	7/10
The Rolling Stone Album Guide	2.5/5 stars
The Source	3.5/5 stars

The Source called the production top notch. The Chicago Tribune deemed the album "playfully clever".

Entertainment Weekly's Neil Drumming described Can I Borrow a Dollar? as "a clever but little-noticed first album". Stanton Swihart of AllMusic considers it to have put Chicago hip-hop on the map and to be an underrated debut album.

== Track listing ==
- All tracks produced by Immenslope & the Twilite Tone, except track 4 produced by the Beatnuts

No.	Title	Performer(s)	Length
1.	"A Penny for My Thoughts"	Common (rap vocals), Lenny Underwood (keyboards), Kenny Aaronson (bass guitar)	4:23
2.	"Charms Alarm"	Common	4:30
3.	"Take It EZ"	Common (rap vocals), Lenny Underwood (keyboards), Tony Orbach (saxophone)	4:08
4.	"Heidi Hoe"	Common	4:29
5.	"Breaker 1/9"	Common	4:01
6.	"Two Scoops of Raisins"	Common, Immenslope (rap vocals), Kenny Aaronson (bass guitar)	5:28
7.	"No Defense"	Common	1:14
8.	"Blows to the Temple"	Common	4:39
9.	"Just in the Nick of Rhyme"	Common	2:30
10.	"Tricks Up My Sleeve"	Common, Rayshel (rap vocals), Lenny Underwood (keyboards), Kenny Aaronson (bass guitar)	3:21
11.	"Puppy Chow"	Common (rap vocals), Tarsha Jones (background vocals)	4:01
12.	"Soul by the Pound"	Common	4:20
13.	"Pitchin' Pennies"	Common	1:58

== Chart positions ==
=== Album chart positions ===
Year	Album	Chart positions
Year	Album	Top R&B/Hip Hop Albums
1993	Can I Borrow a Dollar?	70

=== Singles chart positions ===
Year	Song	Chart positions
Year	Song	Hot Rap Singles
1992	"Take It EZ"	5
1993	"Breaker 1/9"	10
1993	"Soul by the Pound"	7
