= Retrospect for Life =

Single by Common featuring Lauryn Hill

from the album One Day It'll All Make Sense
- Released: July 29, 1997
- Recorded: 1996
- Genre: Hip-hop; Chicago hip-hop
- Length: 6:23
- Label: Relativity Records
- Songwriters: Lonnie Lynn; James Poyser; Ernest Wilson; Stevie Wonder; Syreeta Wright
- Producers: James Poyser; No I.D.

Common singles chronology
"The Bitch in Yoo" (1996)	"Retrospect for Life" (1997)	"Reminding Me (Of Sef)" (1997)

Lauryn Hill singles chronology
"The Sweetest Thing" (1997)	"Retrospect for Life" (1997)	"Doo Wop (That Thing)" (1998)

"Retrospect for Life" is the first single from rapper Common's third album One Day It'll All Make Sense. It features production from James Poyser and No I.D., vocals from Lauryn Hill and bass guitar playing by Vere Isaacs. Its autobiographical lyrics weigh the choices of abortion and birth for a woman impregnated by Common. The lyrics as well as a "mellow, piano-driven beat" has caused Dan Menella to call it the most memorable track on Common's third album. Kevin Powell of Rolling Stone considers it to be the centerpiece of its album, and Leo Stanley of AllMusic similarly boasts of its significant emotional impact. Lauryn Hill's verse embodies portions of "Never Dreamed You'd Leave in Summer" by Stevie Wonder, while the song's beat samples "A Song for You" by Donny Hathaway. A music video directed by Lauryn Hill was made for it. Two of its b-sides, "Invocation" and "Hungry," received low budget music videos.

== Track listing ==
=== A-side ===
1. "Retrospect for Life (radio edit)" (2:14)
2. "Retrospect for Life (Album Version)" (5:23)
3. "Retrospect for Life (instrumental)" (5:23)

=== B-side ===
1. "Invocation" (2:14)
2. "Hungry" (2:33)
3. "Real Nigga Quotes" (5:23)

== See also ==
- List of Common songs
