= Soul by the Pound =

Single by Common Sense

from the album Can I Borrow a Dollar?
- B-side: "Can-I-Bust," "Heidi Hoe"
- Released: July 13, 1993
- Genre: Hip-hop
- Length: 4:20
- Label: Relativity Records
- Songwriters: Common, No I.D., Anthony Craig
- Producers: Immenslope, The Twilite Tone

Common Sense singles chronology
"Breaker 1/9" (1993)	"Soul by the Pound" (1993)	"I Used to Love H.E.R." (1994)

"Soul by the Pound" is the third single from rapper Common Sense's 1992 debut album, Can I Borrow a Dollar?. Its beat, produced by Immenslope and The Twilite Tone, is similar to much production from Common's second album, Resurrection. Its beat contains samples from "I Like It" by DeBarge, "Feelin' It" by Ultramagnetic MC's, "Sneakin' in the Back" by Tom Scott, and "A Chorus Line" by Ultramagnetic MC's (Tim Dog). It is considered to be a "black solidarity" track, but has been attacked for its misogyny. A music video was made for the "Thump Mix" version of this song, but not for the album version. "Soul by the Pound (Thump Mix)" contains samples from "Pot Belly" by Lou Donaldson, "I Know You Got Soul" by Eric B. & Rakim, "Jazz (We've Got)" by A Tribe Called Quest (Q-Tip), "Tonight's Da Night" by Redman, and "Check It Out" by Grand Puba with Mary J. Blige. The "Thump Mix" can be found on the Guidance Recordings compilation album 2001: A Rhyme Odyssey.

== Track listing ==
=== A-side ===
1. "Soul by the Pound (Thump Mix)" (4:35)
2. "Soul by the Pound (Thump Mix Instrumental)" (4:35)
3. "Soul by the Pound (Album Version)" (4:20)

=== B-side ===
1. "Can-I-Bust (vocal)" (5:40)
2. "Heidi Hoe (radio edit)" (4:30)
3. "Heidi Hoe (LP Version)" (4:30)

== Chart positions ==
Chart (1993)	Peak position
U.S. Billboard Bubbling Under R&B/Hip-Hop Singles	8
U.S. Billboard Hot Rap Singles	7

== See also ==
- List of Common songs
