= Ghetto Dreams =

Single by Common featuring Nas

from the album The Dreamer/The Believer
- Released: July 6, 2011
- Recorded: 2011
- Genre: Hip-hop
- Length: 3:58
- Label: Warner Bros., Think Common Music Inc.
- Songwriters: Lonnie Lynn, Nasir Jones, Ernest Wilson
- Producer: No I.D.

Common singles chronology
"Make Her Say" (2009)	"Ghetto Dreams" (2011)	"Favorite Song" (2012)

Nas singles chronology
"Fall in Love" (2010)	"Ghetto Dreams" (2011)	"Nasty" (2011)

"Ghetto Dreams'" is the first single from the Common album, The Dreamer/The Believer. The song is produced by No I.D. and features Nas. It was released on iTunes July 6, 2011. The song is featured on the Madden NFL 12 soundtrack.

== Music video ==
On August 11, 2011, a music video for "Ghetto Dreams" was released via YouTube.

== Reception ==
Reviews have been mostly positive. The production and lyrics have created a lot of buzz for the upcoming album, being slated as a major return to the 90's bangers. Universally the song has been praised for its '90s sounding production by veteran great No I.D. Nas has been critically praised for his guest verse, along with his new single for his respective upcoming album, many have compared this to his Illmatic and It Was Written days, alluding to his previous 'King of New York' status.

== Personnel ==
- produced by No I.D.
- mixed and recorded by Rob Kinelski (assisted by Anna Ugarte) at 4220 Studios, Hollywood
- assistant engineer: Omar Loya
- guitar and bass: Steve Wyreman
- scratches by The Twilight Tone
- manager: Joanna Pacchioli
