= Breaker 1/9 =

Single by Common Sense

from the album Can I Borrow a Dollar?
- Released: January 12, 1993
- Recorded: 1992
- Genre: Hip-hop
- Length: 4:01
- Label: Relativity Records
- Songwriters: Lonnie Lynn, Dion Wilson, Anthony Craig
- Producers: Immenslope, The Twilite Tone

Common Sense singles chronology
"Take It EZ" (1992)	"Breaker 1/9" (1993)	"Soul by the Pound" (1993)

"Breaker 1/9" is a song by Common Sense, released in 1993 as the second single from his debut album Can I Borrow a Dollar?. Produced by Immenslope and The Twilite Tone, it samples both "Between the Sheets" by The Isley Brothers and also contains a lyric from the theme to Three’s Company. Its beat also contains "booming" drums sampled from "Get Out of My Life, Woman" by Lee Dorsey and made for the "jeep beat collective." Its lyrics recount romantic adventures humorously. It holds the worst chart position of any single from that album, yet still reached #10 on the Hot Rap Singles chart.

"Breaker 1/9" is originally a Citizens' Band radio slang term telling other CB users that you'd like to start a transmission on channel 19, and is the phrase that starts C. W. McCall's 1975 novelty hit "Convoy".

== Track listing ==
=== A-side ===
1. "Breaker 1/9 (LP Radio Edit)" (4:02)
2. "Breaker 1/9 (Slope Remix)" (4:18)
3. "Breaker 1/9 (LP Instrumental)" (4:02)

=== B-side ===
1. "Breaker 1/9 (Beat Nuts Remix)" (4:32)
2. "Breaker 1/9 (Beat Nuts Instrumental)" (4:32)
3. "Breaker 1/9 (Slope Instrumental)" (4:18)

== See also ==
- List of Common songs

== Chart positions ==
Chart (1993)	Peak position
U.S. Billboard Bubbling Under R&B/Hip-Hop Singles	7
U.S. Billboard Hot Rap Singles	10
