= Lonnie Lynn =

American basketball player (1943–2014)

Personal information
- Born: May 24, 1943 Chicago, Illinois, U.S.
- Died: September 12, 2014 (aged 71) Denver, Colorado, U.S.
- Listed height: 6 ft 7 in (2.01 m)
- Listed weight: 215 lb (98 kg)

Career information
- High school: DuSable (Chicago, Illinois)
- College: Upper Iowa (1962); Wilberforce (1963–1966)
- NBA draft: 1966: 12th round, 99th overall pick
- Drafted by: St. Louis Hawks
- Playing career: 1966–1970
- Position: Small forward
- Number: 19

Career history
- 1966–1967: Battle Creek Braves
- 1967–1968: Trenton Colonials
- 1968: Tri-Cities Flyers
- 1968: Scranton Miners
- 1968: Springfield Hall of Famers
- 1968–1969: New Haven Elms
- 1969: Denver Rockets
- 1970: Pittsburgh Pipers

Career highlights
- EPBL All-Star (1968)
- Stats at Basketball Reference

Lonnie Lynn Jr. (May 24, 1943 – September 12, 2014), nicknamed "Pops", was an American professional basketball player and spoken word poet. He played college basketball for the Upper Iowa Peacocks and Wilberforce Bulldogs. Lynn played professionally in the North American Basketball League (NABL), Eastern Professional Basketball League (EPBL) and American Basketball Association (ABA) for four seasons.

Lynn performed as a spoken word poet on albums produced by his son, rapper Common.

== Early life ==
Lynn was born on May 24, 1943, in Chicago, the son of Mabel and Lonnie Lynn. He was named "Lonnie" after his father, grandfather and great-grandfather. Lynn's father was a construction worker, while his mother worked in domestic service. His parents split when he was eighteen months old and he was then raised by his mother as he rarely saw his father.

When he was five years old, Lynn fell from a fence rail and fractured his skull. He was taken to a neighborhood hospital and "given a room to die in" until his mother and a neighbor intervened to save his life. Lynn was sent to live with his mother's grandparents on their farm in Covington, Tennessee, at the age of seven. He discovered basketball there when he attended a game at a local high school.

Lynn returned to his mother's home in Chicago when he was aged 10. He would play basketball "in the street from early morning until night" while growing up; his neighborhood used peach baskets nailed to lampposts as goals.

Lynn played as a center on the basketball team at DuSable High School alongside his younger brother, Russell. He was a midyear graduate and finished his high school career in January 1962. Lynn received 25 athletic scholarships to play college basketball and had desired to attend Michigan State University. However, he had academic problems that would have complicated his reception of the Big Ten Conference aid program.

== College basketball career ==
On January 29, 1962, Lynn registered for the second semester at Upper Iowa University. He had been encouraged to enroll at what was a smaller school by his high school coach who believed it would give Lynn more individual attention. On February 3, he recorded 24 points in his collegiate debut against Buena Vista College.

Lynn attended Michigan State University for a brief time but withdrew after he experienced academic and personal problems. He transferred to Wilberforce University for the 1963–64 season; Lynn appeared in five games before he was ruled ineligible in December 1963 by the National Association of Intercollegiate Athletics (NAIA) because Wilberforce did not disclose he was a transfer. He returned to Wilberforce for the 1964–65 season and was selected to the NAIA All-District second-team. Lynn averaged 22.2 points and 23 rebounds per game during the 1965–66 season.

Lynn majored in sociology at Wilberforce University.

== Professional basketball career ==
On May 13, 1966, Lynn was selected by the St. Louis Hawks in the 1966 NBA draft. He was also selected in the fourth round of the 1966 North American Basketball League (NABL) draft by the Battle Creek Braves. He attended rookie camp with the Hawks in June 1966. On November 3, he signed with the Braves, and played for them during the 1966–67 season. Lynn also worked as a counsellor for the Job Corps while he was playing for the Braves.

In June 1967, Lynn attended the Hawks' rookie camp, where he was the top scorer. He was invited to their training camp in September, and was the final player cut before the start of the 1967–68 NBA season. Lynn unsuccessfully worked out with the Chicago Bulls and attempted to join the Dallas Chaparrals of the American Basketball Association (ABA) but was prevented by the Hawks who owned his rights. He instead started the 1967–68 season with the Trenton Colonials of the Eastern Professional Basketball League (EPBL). Lynn was bought by the Tri-Cities Flyers in January 1968. On February 5, he was selected to play in the EPBL all-star game. On February 8, Lynn was traded to the Scranton Miners. He had averaged 20 points and 25 rebounds per game in three home appearances with the Flyers but disenchanted his head coach, Gene Guarilia, who had tried to encourage Lynn to work on his defensive rebounding to return to the NBA.

On November 21, 1968, Lynn was traded to the Springfield Hall of Famers. He joined the New Haven Elms in December 1968.

On September 17, 1969, Lynn signed with the Denver Rockets of the ABA. He became good friends with his teammate, Spencer Haywood. Lynn was released by the Rockets on December 11 at the decision of newly appointed head coach Joe Belmont. On January 23, 1970, Lynn signed with the Pittsburgh Pipers. He re-signed with the renamed Pittsburgh Condors for the 1970–71 ABA season on July 25, 1970, but was waived before the season started on August 22.

Lynn claimed that he, Haywood and Paul Silas "practically invented offensive rebounds."

== Personal life ==
Lynn met his first wife, Mahalia Ann Brown, while he attended Wilberforce University. In 1970, he returned to Chicago where Brown worked in teaching. He unsuccessfully applied for jobs but was rejected because of his basketball background. Lynn also developed a drug and alcohol addiction because of a sudden withdrawal of the pills he received from his basketball trainers. After the birth of his first son, Lonnie Rashid (later rapper Common), Lynn left his family because he felt that his bad habits of drug and alcohol use meant "it would be better for everyone" if he was not around. He initially received free drugs from dealers who wanted to use his status; he eventually lost his apartment, car and jewelry while trying to support his habit. Lynn moved back in with his mother and borrowed money from her to buy drugs. Brown prevented Lynn from seeing Rashid until he beat his habit with the support of his mother.

In 1974, Lynn received a call from Haywood who was now playing for the Seattle SuperSonics in the NBA. The team were looking for a rebounding forward so Haywood recommended Lynn and encouraged him to introduce himself when the SuperSonics were in Chicago. Lynn met the team's head coach, Bill Russell, and an assistant invited him to tryout for the team in Seattle but warned Lynn about his drug problem. Haywood suggested that Lynn bring his family to the tryout to prove that he had settled down. Lynn packed his belongings into his car and collected Brown and Rashid but did not share where he was going; he instead claimed that he had a house he wanted them to see. Brown became suspicious once they approached the Interstate 90 and Lynn finally explained where they were going. They stopped at a motel in Madison, Wisconsin, where Brown escaped while Lynn was sleeping and informed police that she had been abducted. Lynn was arrested and charged with false imprisonment and possession of heroin. Publicity over the arrest resulted in the cancellation of his SuperSonics tryout and he returned to Chicago.

Lynn's parents died nine months apart in 1977 and he used $500 that was left by them to move to Denver. He lived with a cousin and worked as a common laborer. Lynn began a concerted effort to be involved in Rashid's life again and called him weekly. A few months after he arrived in Denver, he was hired as a youth counselor at the Lookout Mountain Youth Center. Lynn used Rashid as inspiration and treated the boys there as how he would want his son treated. He set up a basketball league and "gang group" as an informal meeting of gang members to settle differences.

After Lynn and Brown divorced, Rashid regularly visited Lynn in Colorado and they attended the NBA All-Star Game each year. He met his second wife, special education teacher Val Nogay, at Lookout in 1987. They had a son, Malone, born in 1988. Lynn was fired from Lookout in 1992; he had requested time off due to health difficulties that were caused by work-related stress but it caused a clash with the Lookout director. Lynn was subsequently contacted by Jim Brown, a friend of Haywood, to run the Colorado branch of his Amer-I-Can program. Nogay died of cancer in 1996.

== Spoken word poetry ==
Lynn performed on several albums by his son, Common.

On his son's records, Lynn shared opinions, experiences and wisdom to a younger hip hop audience in spoken word poetry format. Many of these appearances, in particular "Pops Rap" on Resurrection, feature Lynn discussing the hippie ideals that have found their way into hip hop culture. In an article for National Public Radio, journalist Robert Siegel wrote of Lonnie "Pops" Lynn:

Lonnie "Pops" Lynn is the father of the rapper Common, and a regular contributor to his son's albums. Lynn's spoken poetry graces the last song on each CD. Lynn says tells Robert Siegel Common's influence set Lynn himself on the right path.

— Robert Siegel

== Death ==
Lynn died of prostate cancer on September 12, 2014, at the age of 71.
