= Resurrection (Common song) =

Single by Common Sense

from the album Resurrection
- B-side: "Chapter 13"
- Released: April 4, 1995
- Recorded: 1994
- Genre: Hip-hop, jazz rap
- Length: 3:47
- Label: Relativity Records
- Songwriters: Lonnie Lynn, No I.D.
- Producer: No I.D.

Common Sense singles chronology
"I Used to Love H.E.R." (1994)	"Resurrection" (1995)	"The Bitch in Yoo" (1996)

"Resurrection" is the second single from rapper Common Sense's 1994 album of the same name. Its piano-led beat, produced by No I.D., contains samples from "The Signs Pt. II" by David Axelrod, "Dolphin Dance" by Ahmad Jamal, "Sorcerer of Isis" by Power of Zeus, "Ice" by Spirit and both "Why Can't People Be Colors Too?" and "Help Is on the Way" by The Whatnauts. The song contains free-associative lyrics by Common and scratches by DJ Mista Sinista that "blend harmoniously with the jazzy melody." Nick Quested directed the "Resurrection" music video.

== Track listing ==
=== A-side ===
1. "Resurrection '95 (Clean)" (4:00)
2. "Resurrection (Extra P. Remix) (Clean)" (4:09)
3. "Resurrection (Large Professor Remix) (Clean)" (4:06)
4. "Resurrection '95 (A Cappella Version)" (3:20)

=== B-side ===
1. "Resurrection '95 (Instrumental)" (4:00)
2. "Resurrection (Extra P. Instrumental)" (4:12)
3. "Resurrection (Large Professor Instrumental)" (4:06)
4. "Chapter 13 (Clean)" (5:41)

== Chart positions ==
Chart (1994)	Peak position
U.S. Billboard Bubbling Under Hot 100 Singles	2
U.S. Billboard Hot R&B/Hip-Hop Singles & Tracks	88
U.S. Billboard Hot Rap Singles	22

== See also ==
- List of Common songs
