= No I.D. =

American music producer (born 1971)

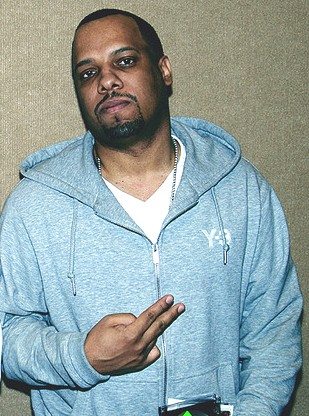
- No I.D. in 2008

Background information
- Also known as: Dion Wilson; Immenslope
- Born: Ernest Dion Wilson; June 23, 1971 (age 55); Chicago, Illinois, U.S.
- Genres: Hip hop; R&B
- Occupations: Record producer; DJ; rapper; arranger; songwriter
- Works: No I.D. production discography
- Years active: 1987–present
- Labels: Capitol; Roc Nation; Def Jam; GOOD; ARTium; So So Def; Relativity
- Member of: Cocaine 80s

Ernest Dion Wilson (born June 23, 1971), known professionally as No I.D. (formerly Immenslope), is an American record producer, DJ and songwriter from Chicago, Illinois. He is known for his early work with Chicago-based rapper Common, as well as his career mentorship of rappers Kanye West, J. Cole and Logic. Wilson first gained success for his role as an in-house producer for Jermaine Dupri's So So Def Recordings—leading to largely uncredited work on Dupri's productions "My Boo" by Usher, "Outta My System" and "Let Me Hold You" by Bow Wow—before reaching commercial success with his solo productions. He worked with Jay-Z to produce his singles "Run This Town" and "Holy Grail," West to produce "Heartless," and Drake to produce "Find Your Love" and "Nonstop"; each have peaked within the top five of the Billboard Hot 100 chart.

Nicknamed "the Godfather of Chicago hip hop," Wilson is also a former recording artist and signed with Relativity Records to release his only studio album, Accept Your Own and Be Yourself (The Black Album) (1997). He served as president of West's record label GOOD Music from 2008 to 2011, and thereafter formed his own label, ARTium Records as an imprint of Def Jam Recordings. The label has signed artists including Vince Staples, Jhené Aiko and Snoh Aalegra. Also in 2011, Wilson formed the supergroup Cocaine 80s with Common, Aiko, and James Fauntleroy, and was named Executive Vice President of A&R for Def Jam Recordings. In 2018, he was appointed as Executive Vice President of Capitol Music Group.

== Musical career ==
In 1996, Wilson released an album under the pseudonym No I.D., titled Accept Your Own and Be Yourself (The Black Album). The moniker No I.D. is a play on the backwards spelling of his birth name, Dion. He also released a beat tape, titled Invisible Beats. In Wilson's early career he was working as a co-producer for Jermaine Dupri. No I.D. went on to work on hit singles such as "My Boo" by Usher and Alicia Keys and "Let Me Hold You" by Bow Wow featuring Omarion, as well as "Resurrection" and the ode to hip hop "I Used to Love H.E.R.", which garnered Chicago-based rapper Common his early fame. Wilson also introduced Chicago-based rapper Kanye West to hip hop production, inviting him to his sessions with Common, when West was only beginning. He also introduced West to a long-time friend named Kyambo "Hip Hop" Joshua, who was A&R for Roc-A-Fella Records, who eventually signed West to his imprint Hip Hop Since 1978, which launched West's career as an artist and into stardom. West cites Wilson as his mentor on "Last Call," the outro to his highly acclaimed debut album The College Dropout (2004). West also referenced Wilson's mentorship on songs such as "Big Brother" and "Made in America." Wilson's second official release was with Dug Infinite, a two-album package titled The Sampler, vol. 1 (2002).

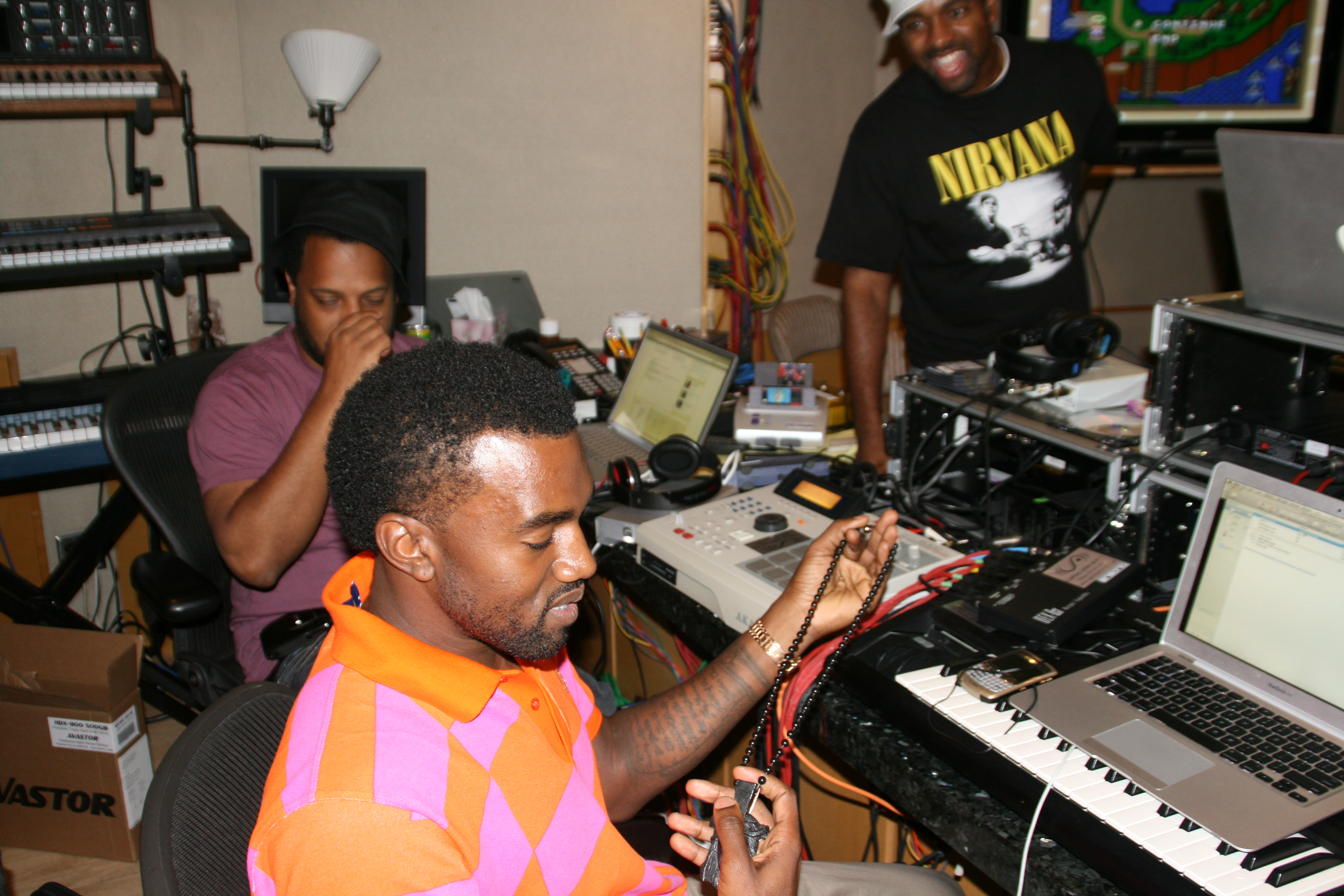
No I.D. in a recording studio (left) with Kanye West (middle) and former G.O.O.D. Music A&R Greg "Olskool Ice-Gre" Lewis (right)

In 2007, he was the focus of significant attention for producing two songs from Jay-Z's album American Gangster. At the time he worked with artists such as Jay-Z, Rhymefest, Plies, Big Sean, Killer Mike, Rick Ross, Drake (Thank Me Later) and Kanye West (808's & Heartbreak, My Beautiful Dark Twisted Fantasy), Young Jeezy, and Rihanna on their then-upcoming albums. Wilson produced "D.O.A. (Death of Auto-Tune)", the first single for Jay-Z's eleventh studio album The Blueprint 3 (2009), as well as the second single "Run This Town", which features Kanye West and Rihanna. He once again teamed up with Common for the first time since 1997, when he handled the production for his ninth album The Dreamer/The Believer (2011). In June 2011, Wilson formed Cocaine 80s, a musical ensemble composed of several musicians, including Common, James Fauntleroy II, Kevin Randolph, Makeba Riddick, Rob "The Mixer" Kinelski, Steve Wyreman, Free Bass, Keys of Coke and Sam Lewis, among several others.

After resigning as President of Kanye West's G.O.O.D. Music record company, in August 2011, it was announced No I.D. was appointed Executive Vice President of A&R for Def Jam Recordings. In addition, Def Jam has signed an exclusive joint venture label deal for No I.D.'s Artium Recordings. The announcements were made by Barry Weiss, Chairman and CEO of Universal Republic and Island Def Jam Motown and Karen Kwak, EVP / Head of A&R, Island Def Jam Music Group. In 2012, Wilson was an executive producer on New York City-based rapper Nas' critically acclaimed eleventh album Life Is Good, producing five songs, including the twice Grammy Award-nominated single "Daughters", as well as "Loco-Motive" and "Accident Murderers".In April 2013, it was revealed Wilson signed up-and-coming rapper Logic, to Def Jam. In 2013, Wilson served as the primary producer of G.O.O.D. Music recording artist Big Sean's second album Hall of Fame. In an August 2013 interview with Complex, Wilson said he was currently working on Jhene Aiko and Logic's upcoming respective debut albums. Since the inception of Artium, Wilson has signed Common, Los Angeles-based singer Jhené Aiko and singer Elijah Blake. On June 30, 2017, Wilson was credited as the primary producer on 4:44 - an album released via Tidal by Jay-Z. The album was met with widespread acclaim from music reviews and is notable for the personal account of Jay-Z's alleged infidelity on the title track. No I.D. has produced more tracks for Jay-Z than anyone else other than Just Blaze and Timbaland.

== ARTium Recordings ==
ARTium Recordings
- Parent company: Universal Music Group
- Founded: 2011; 15 years ago
- Founder: No I.D.
- Distributors: Roc Nation; AWAL; Def Jam; Interscope; Universal
- Genre: Hip hop; R&B
- Country of origin: United States
- Location: Chicago, Illinois

ARTium Recordings is an American record label imprint, founded by No I.D. In August 2011, it was announced No I.D. was appointed Executive Vice President of A&R for Def Jam Recordings. In addition, Def Jam has signed an exclusive joint venture label deal for No I.D.'s ARTium Recordings. The announcements were made by Barry Weiss, Chairman and CEO of Universal Republic and Island Def Jam Motown and Karen Kwak, EVP / Head of A&R, Island Def Jam Music Group. No I.D. would report directly to Mr. Weiss and Ms. Kwak. In 2012, No I.D. signed American neo-soul singer Jhené Aiko. By September 2013, No I.D. had signed up-and-coming American R&B singers Elijah Blake and Snoh Aalegra On June 4, 2014, it was announced No I.D.'s longtime collaborator and Chicago-bred rapper Common, signed a recording contract with Def Jam Recordings and ARTium Recordings.

=== Artists (past and present) ===
- Cocaine 80s
- Common
- Jhené Aiko
- Jordan Ward
- Snoh Aalegra
- Vince Staples
- DJ Dahi
- Mark Battles
- Ogi

=== Discography ===
Artist	Album	Details
Jhené Aiko	Sail Out (EP)	Released: November 12, 2013; Chart position: #8 U.S.; RIAA certification: Gold
Common	Nobody's Smiling	Released: July 22, 2014; Chart position: #6 U.S.
Jhené Aiko	Souled Out	Released: September 9, 2014; Chart position: #3 U.S.
Elijah Blake	Drift (EP)	Released: September 30, 2014; Chart position: —
Vince Staples	Hell Can Wait (EP)	Released: October 7, 2014; Chart position: #90 U.S.
Elijah Blake	Shadows & Diamonds	Released: June 23, 2015; Chart position: —
Vince Staples	Summertime '06	Released: June 30, 2015; Chart position: #39 U.S.
TWENTY88	TWENTY88 (EP) (released with GOOD)	Released: April 1, 2016; Chart position: #5 U.S.
Snoh Aalegra	Don't Explain (EP)	Released: April 8, 2016; Chart position: —
Vince Staples	Prima Donna (EP)	Released: August 26, 2016; Chart position: #50 U.S.
Common	Black America Again	Released: November 4, 2016; Chart position: #25 U.S.
Jhené Aiko	Trip	Released: September 22, 2017; Chart position: #5 U.S.
Snoh Aalegra	Feels	Released: October 20, 2017; Chart position: —
Snoh Aalegra	Ugh, those feels again	Released: August 16, 2019; Chart position: #73 U.S.
Jhené Aiko	Chilombo	Released: March 6, 2020; Chart position: #5 U.S.
Snoh Aalegra	Temporary Highs in the Violet Skies	Released: July 9, 2021; Chart position: #24 U.S.

== Discography ==
=== Studio albums ===
List of albums, with selected chart positions and sales figures
Title	Album details	Peak chart positions
Title	Album details	US R&B/HH
Accept Your Own and Be Yourself (The Black Album)	Release: September 23, 1997 (US); Label: Relativity; Formats: CD, digital download	94
The Sampler, vol. 1 (with Dug Infinite)	Released: 2002 (US); Label: All Natural Inc.; Formats: CD, digital download	—
From the Private Collection of Saba and No I.D. (with Saba)	Released: March 18, 2025; Label: From the Private Collection, LLP; Formats: Streaming	—
"—" denotes a recording that did not chart or was not released in that territory.

=== Singles ===
List of singles as featured performer, with selected chart positions, showing year released and album name
Title	Year	Peak chart positions			Album
Title	Year	US	US R&B	US Rap	Album
"Sky's the Limit"	1997	—	—	—	Accept Your Own and Be Yourself (The Black Album)
"—" denotes a title that did not chart, or was not released in that territory.

=== Guest appearances ===
List of non-single guest appearances, with other performing artists, showing year released and album name
Title	Year	Other artist(s)	Album
"Two Scoops of Raisins"	1992	Common	Can I Borrow a Dollar?
"In My Own World (Check the Method)"	1994	Common	Resurrection
"When You Hot You Hot"	1998	DJ Honda, Dug Infinite	h II
"America"	2017	Logic, Chuck D, Black Thought, Big Lenbo	Everybody

== Production discography ==
=== Singles produced ===
List of singles as either producer or co-producer, with selected chart positions and certifications, showing year released, performing artists and album name
Title	Year	Peak chart positions										Certifications	Album
Title	Year	US	US R&B	US Rap	CAN	GER	NLD	NZ	SWE	SWI	UK	Certifications	Album
"Take It EZ" (Common Sense)	1992	—	—	5	—	—	—	—	—	—	—		Can I Borrow a Dollar?
"Breaker 1/9" (Common Sense)	1992	—	107	10	—	—	—	—	—	—	—		Can I Borrow a Dollar?
"Soul by the Pound" (Common Sense)	1993	—	108	7	—	—	—	—	—	—	—		Can I Borrow a Dollar?
"I Used to Love H.E.R." (Common Sense)	1994	—	91	31	—	—	—	—	—	—	—		Resurrection
"Resurrection" (Common Sense)	1994	102	88	22	—	—	—	—	—	—	—		Resurrection
"Retrospect for Life" (Common featuring Lauryn Hill)	1997	—	—	—	—	—	—	—	—	—	—		One Day It'll All Make Sense
"Smile" (G-Unit)	2004	—	72	—	—	—	—	—	—	—	—		Beg for Mercy
"Let Me Hold You" (Bow Wow featuring Omarion)	2005	4	2	1	—	—	—	—	—	—	27	RIAA: Platinum	Wanted
"Ooh Wee" (Majic Massey)	2005	—	—	—	—	—	—	—	—	—	—		—N/a
"Outta My System" (Bow Wow featuring T-Pain and Johntá Austin)	2006	22	12	2	—	—	—	2	—	—	—	RIAA: Platinum	The Price of Fame
"Put It on Ya" (Plies featuring Chris J)	2008	31	8	6	—	—	—	—	—	—	—		Da REAList
"Heartless" (Kanye West)	2008	2	4	1	8	37	31	6	17	46	10	ARIA: 4× Platinum; IFPI: Platinum; BVMI: Gold; FIMI: Gold; RMNZ: Gold; BPI: Platinum; RIAA: 7× Platinum; RIAA: Platinum (Mastertone)	808s & Heartbreak
"D.O.A. (Death of Auto-Tune)" (Jay-Z)	2009	24	43	15	—	—	—	—	—	—	79		The Blueprint 3
"Run This Town" (Jay-Z featuring Kanye West and Rihanna)	2009	2	3	1	6	18	30	9	8	9	1	RIAA: 2× Platinum; BPI: Platinum; RMNZ: Gold; BVMI: Gold; ARIA: Platinum	The Blueprint 3
"Find Your Love" (Drake)	2010	5	3	—	10	—	85	—	—	—	24	BPI: Silver; RIAA: 3× Platinum	Thank Me Later
"Mr. Rager" (Kid Cudi)	2010	77	—	—	—	—	—	—	—	—	—	BPI: Silver	Man on the Moon II: The Legend of Mr. Rager
"Ready Set Go" (Killer Mike featuring T.I.)	2010	—	110	—	—	—	—	—	—	—	—		PL3DGE
"My Last" (featuring Chris Brown)	2011	30	4	1	—	—	—	—	—	—	—	RIAA: Platinum	Finally Famous
"Ghetto Dreams" (Common featuring Nas)	2011	—	—	—	—	—	—	—	—	—	—		The Dreamer/The Believer
"Blue Sky" (Common)	2011	—	—	—	—	—	—	—	—	—	—		The Dreamer/The Believer
"Sweet" (Common)	2011	—	—	—	—	—	—	—	—	—	—		The Dreamer/The Believer
"Celebrate" (Common)	2011	—	95	—	—	—	—	—	—	—	—		The Dreamer/The Believer
"This Time" (Melanie Fiona featuring J. Cole)	2012	—	89	—	—	—	—	—	—	—	—		The MF Life
"Daughters" (Nas)	2012	—	78	—	—	—	—	—	—	—	—		Life Is Good
"Accident Murderers" (Nas featuring Rick Ross)	2012	—	—	—	—	—	—	—	—	—	—		Life Is Good
"Pain" (Pusha T featuring Future)	2012	—	—	—	—	—	—	—	—	—	—		My Name Is My Name
"Switch Up" (Big Sean featuring Common)	2013	—	50	—	—	—	—	—	—	—	—		Hall of Fame
"Black Skinhead" (Kanye West)	2013	69	21	15	66	—	—	—	—	—	34		Yeezus
"Holy Grail" (Jay-Z featuring Justin Timberlake)	2013	4	2	1	13	24	83	24	15	24	7	MC: Platinum; IFPI: Platinum; BVMI: Gold; RMNZ: Gold; GLF: 2× Platinum; BPI: Gold; RIAA: 4× Platinum	Magna Carta Holy Grail
"Control" (Big Sean featuring Kendrick Lamar and Jay Electronica)	2013	111	43	—	—	—	—	—	—	—	—		—N/a
"Bound 2"	2013	12	3	3	74	—	—	—	—	—	55	ARIA: 3× Platinum; IFPI: Gold; AFP: Gold; BPI: Platinum; RIAA: 4× Platinum	Yeezus
"Satellites" (Tassho Pearce featuring Kid Cudi)	2014	—	—	—	—	—	—	—	—	—	—		G.O.O.D. Company
"Kingdom" (Common featuring Vince Staples)	2014	—	—	—	—	—	—	—	—	—	—		Nobody's Smiling
"To Love & Die" (Jhené Aiko featuring Cocaine 80s)	2014	—	46	—	—	—	—	—	—	—	72		Souled Out
"Speak My Piece" (Common)	2014	—	—	—	—	—	—	—	—	—	—		Nobody's Smiling
"Diamonds" (Common featuring Big Sean)	2014	—	—	—	—	—	—	—	—	—	—		Nobody's Smiling
"The Story of O.J." (Jay-Z)	2017	23	10	7	53	—	—	—	—	—	28	RIAA: Gold	4:44
"4:44" (Jay-Z)	2017	35	15	11	69	—	—	—	—	—	73		4:44
"Bam" (Jay-Z featuring Damian Marley)	2017	47	21	16	—	—	—	—	—	—	93		4:44
"New Light" (John Mayer)	2018	—	—	—	—	—	—	—	—	—	—		Sob Rock
"—" denotes a recording that did not chart or was not released in that territory.

== Awards and nominations ==
=== Grammy Awards ===
Year	Nominee / work	Award	Result
2010	"Run This Town"	Best Rap Song	Won
2010	"D.O.A. (Death of Auto-Tune)"	Best Rap Song	Nominated
2013	"Daughters"	Best Rap Song	Nominated
2014	"Holy Grail"	Best Rap Song	Nominated
2015	"Bound 2"	Best Rap Song	Nominated
2018	"The Story of O.J."	Best Rap Song	Nominated
2018	"The Story of O.J."	Record of the Year	Nominated
2018	"4:44"	Song of the Year	Nominated
2018	"4:44"	Album of the Year	Nominated
2018	Himself	Producer of the Year, Non-Classical	Nominated

== See also ==
- Honorific nicknames in popular music
