= I Used to Love H.E.R. =

Single by Common Sense

from the album Resurrection
- B-side: "Communism"
- Released: September 27, 1994
- Recorded: 1994; Battery Studios (Chicago, Illinois)
- Genre: Hip-hop, jazz rap
- Length: 4:39
- Label: Relativity Records
- Songwriters: Lonnie Lynn Jr., Dion Wilson
- Producer: No I.D.

Common Sense singles chronology
"Soul by the Pound" (1993)	"I Used to Love H.E.R." (1994)	"Resurrection" (1995)

Music video
- "I Used to Love H.E.R." on YouTube

"I Used to Love H.E.R." is a hip-hop song by the Chicago-born rapper Common Sense. Released in September 27, 1994 as the lead single from his second studio album Resurrection, "I Used to Love H.E.R." has since become one of Common's best known songs. Produced by No I.D., its jazzy beat samples "The Changing World" by George Benson. It is often regarded as one of the greatest hip-hop recordings ever.

== Acclaim and legacy ==
Tiffany Hamilton of AllHipHop.com described it as a "timeless ode to Hip-Hop [...] that established Common as one of the pioneers in conscious Hip-Hop." Vukile Simelane of RapReviews.com claims it to have one of the "fattest beat[s] ever constructed". Alex Henderson of AllMusic considers it to be the standout track on Resurrection. Duke University professor Mark Anthony Neal considers it to be Common's best single ever. Andrea Duncan-Mao of XXL describes it as a "bittersweet ode to hip-hop" and a "classic" track. Pitchfork's Ryan Dombal considers it to be a "classic hip-hop parable". In 2008, the song was ranked number 69 on VH1's 100 Greatest Songs of Hip Hop. It was ranked number 1 on About.com's Greatest Rap Songs Of All Time.

== Remixes ==
- 9th Wonder, a producer from North Carolina, remixed "I Used to Love H.E.R." and released the remix as a single. Independent record label Boom Bap Records distributed the single, which contained "The 6th Sense" as a B-side.

== Music video ==
The music video was filmed on September 20, 1994 and directed by Chris Halliburton. It shows clips of Common's home of Southside Chicago and a woman, who is the main subject of the video because of the extended metaphor. It shows how she "became a gangster" when this woman is seen with two other gangster-looking women in allusion to the rise of gangsta rap.

== Track listing ==
=== A-side ===
1. "I Used to Love H.E.R." (4:29)
2. "I Used to Love H.E.R. (Instrumental)" (4:43)
3. "I Used to Love H.E.R. (Acapella)"

=== B-side ===
1. "Communism (2:16)"
2. "Communism (Instrumental)" (2:39)
3. "Communism (Acapella)"

== Chart positions ==
Chart (1994)	Peak position
U.S. Billboard Hot R&B/Hip-Hop Singles & Tracks	91
U.S. Billboard Hot Rap Singles	31

== See also ==
- List of Common songs
