= Resurrection (Common album) =

Studio album by Common Sense
- Released: October 4, 1994
- Recorded: 1994
- Studio: Battery (Chicago, Illinois)
- Genre: Midwest hip-hop
- Length: 54:23
- Label: Relativity
- Producers: No I.D.; The Twilite Tone

Common Sense chronology
Can I Borrow a Dollar? (1992)	Resurrection (1994)	One Day It'll All Make Sense (1997)

Singles from Resurrection
- 1. "I Used to Love H.E.R." Released: September 27, 1994; 2. "Resurrection" Released: April 4, 1995

Resurrection is the second album by the American rapper Common Sense. It was released on October 4, 1994, by Relativity Records. It was mainly produced by No I.D., who also produced most of Common's 1992 debut Can I Borrow A Dollar? It is the last album to feature the rapper's full stage name, as after this album the "Sense" portion of the name was dropped, making the rapper simply known to this day as "Common".

The album received critical acclaim but not a significant amount of mainstream attention. Originally, it was rated 3.5 mics in The Source; however, in 1998, it was selected as one of The Source's 100 Best Hip Hop Albums.

== Songs ==
The album is divided into two sections: the "East Side of Stony" (tracks 1–7) and "West Side of Stony" (tracks 8–15). Stony Island Avenue is a street that runs through the South Side of Chicago, where Common was raised. The closing track, "Pop's Rap" was the first of a series of tracks featuring spoken word and poetry by Common's father Lonnie "Pops" Lynn Sr., whom Common has used to close several of his albums since. Interlaced throughout the album are short interludes that form a loose narrative concerning day-to-day life on the South Side.

Songs such as "Thisisme", are full of self-assessing rhymes that reflect the emcee's personal growth since 1992's Can I Borrow A Dollar? Likewise the crasser moments found on that LP, such as the misogynistic "Heidi Hoe" are greatly toned down for Resurrection, and replaced by thought-provoking narratives such as "Chapter 13 (Rich Man Vs. Poor Man)", and "I Used to Love H.E.R." - a song that re-imagines Hip-hop as a formerly unadulterated woman, led astray after being enticed by materialistic elements of life. The use of a conflicted woman as an allegory for hip-hop allowed Common to covertly express his disdain at the genre's turn toward gangsta-inspired content and what he saw as the resulting reorientation of hip-hop artists.

This song, which brought Common to the attention of fans and music critics alike, would also become the cause of a rift between the rapper and West Coast emcee Ice Cube, who took exception to the insinuation that the West Coast pioneered gangsta style was detrimental to hip-hop. Together with his Westside Connection compatriots, Cube hurled insults Common's way on the song "Westside Slaughterhouse" and throughout the group's album Bow Down, to which the rapper replied with the equally venomous "The Bitch in Yoo." In the aftermath of the murders of both Tupac Shakur and the Notorious B.I.G., the rivalry would be settled out of public view at a peacemaking function held by Louis Farrakhan at his home.

The album is broken down track-by-track by Common in Brian Coleman's book Check the Technique.

== Reception and aftermath ==
Professional ratings
Review scores
Source	Rating
AllMusic	4/5 stars
Chicago Tribune	3.5/4 stars
Christgau's Consumer Guide	(2-star Honorable Mention)
Encyclopedia of Popular Music	4/5 stars
Pitchfork	8.7/10
RapReviews	9.5/10
Record Collector	3/5 stars
Rolling Stone	4/5 stars
The Rolling Stone Album Guide	4/5 stars
The Source	3.5/5 stars

Resurrection is frequently held to be a classic album by hip-hop-music critics. This album signified both the arrival of a level of maturity in Common's work, and yet the end of his first phase, which was characterized by a more straightforward and underground-based sound. Subsequent albums by the emcee would see him delving into experimentation and themes such as love, which perhaps marked his second phase.

In the Rolling Stone review, Touré wrote of the album: "Resurrection belongs among the best recent hardcore albums: Illmatic by Nas, Enter the Wu-Tang (36 Chambers) by Wu-Tang Clan, and Ready to Die by the Notorious B.I.G." Despite critical acclaim, the album sold poorly, peaking at #179 on the Billboard 200 with 2,000 copies sold before dropping out of the charts the following week.

== Influence and legacy ==
Kanye West, one of Common's frequent collaborators, has echoed lines from Resurrection on several of his own records.

On "Homecoming", the twelfth track from his third LP, Graduation, West drops a reference to "I Used To Love H.E.R." in the song's first verse, stating:

I met this girl when I was three years old

And what I loved most, she had so much soul

== Track listing ==
- All tracks produced by No I.D., except tracks 12 and 14 produced by Ynot.

#	Title	Length	Performer(s)
1	"Resurrection"	3:47	Common
2	"I Used to Love H.E.R."	4:39	Common
3	"Watermelon"	2:39	Common
4	"Book of Life"	5:06	Common
5	"In My Own World (Check the Method)"	3:32	Common & No I.D.
6	"Another Wasted Nite With..."	1:02	Common
7	"Nuthin' to Do"	5:20	Common
8	"Communism"	2:16	Common
9	"WMOE"	0:34	Common & Mohammed Ali
10	"Thisisme"	4:54	Common
11	"Orange Pineapple Juice"	3:28	Common
12	"Chapter 13 (Rich Man Vs. Poor Man)"	5:23	Common & The Twilite Tone
13	"Maintaining"	3:49	Common
14	"Sum Shit I Wrote"	4:31	Common
15	"Pop's Rap"	3:22	Lonnie "Pops" Lynn

== Chart positions ==
=== Album chart positions ===
Chart performance for Resurrection
Year	Chart	Peak position
1994	Billboard 200	179

=== Singles chart positions ===
Year	Song	Chart positions		
Year	Song	Hot R&B/Hip-Hop Singles & Tracks	Hot Rap Singles	Hot Dance Music/Maxi-Singles Sales
1994	"I Used to Love H.E.R."	91	31	34
1995	"Resurrection"	88	22	13

== Name ==
- The album was originally released under Common's original stage name, "Common Sense." However, the "Sense" has since been dropped from the album's listings because of a legal case between Common and a California-based ska band named Common Sense.
- The song "Thisisme" is used as the name for Common's greatest hits compilation, Thisisme Then: The Best of Common.
