= Chicago hip-hop =

US regional subgenre of hip-hop music

- Chicago rapper Common
- Stylistic origins: Midwestern hip hop; Sampling (music); hip house
- Cultural origins: 1980s, Chicago, IL, U.S.

Subgenres
- Drill rap; Conscious rap

Regional scenes
- Midwestern hip-hop

Chicago hip-hop is a regional subgenre of hip-hop music that originated in Chicago in the late 1980s in the form of hip house. It became commonplace for serious rappers to cite the Nation of Islam, a Black Muslim organization headquartered in Chicago, as a lyrical and ideological influence in the 1980s and 1990s, a rap theme often resulting in controversy. In the 2000s, Chicago produced artists such as Kanye West and Common.

In the 2010s, drill music became popular in Chicago. Influenced by trap music and gangsta rap it originated on Chicago’s South Side. Chicago's long-standing hip-hop community has included graffiti artists, breakdancers, activists, hip-hop writers, rappers and hip-hop producers.

== Notable artists ==
- Kanye West
- Common
- Chief Keef
- Polo G
- Lil Durk
- Twista
- King Von
- G Herbo
- Lupe Fiasco
- Earl Sweatshirt
- Lil Bibby
- Cupcakke
- Juice WRLD
- Chance the Rapper
- Lucki
- Famous Dex
- Do or Die (group)
- Dreezy
- Lil Reese
- Saba
- Noname

== See also ==
- Music of Chicago
