= Common discography =

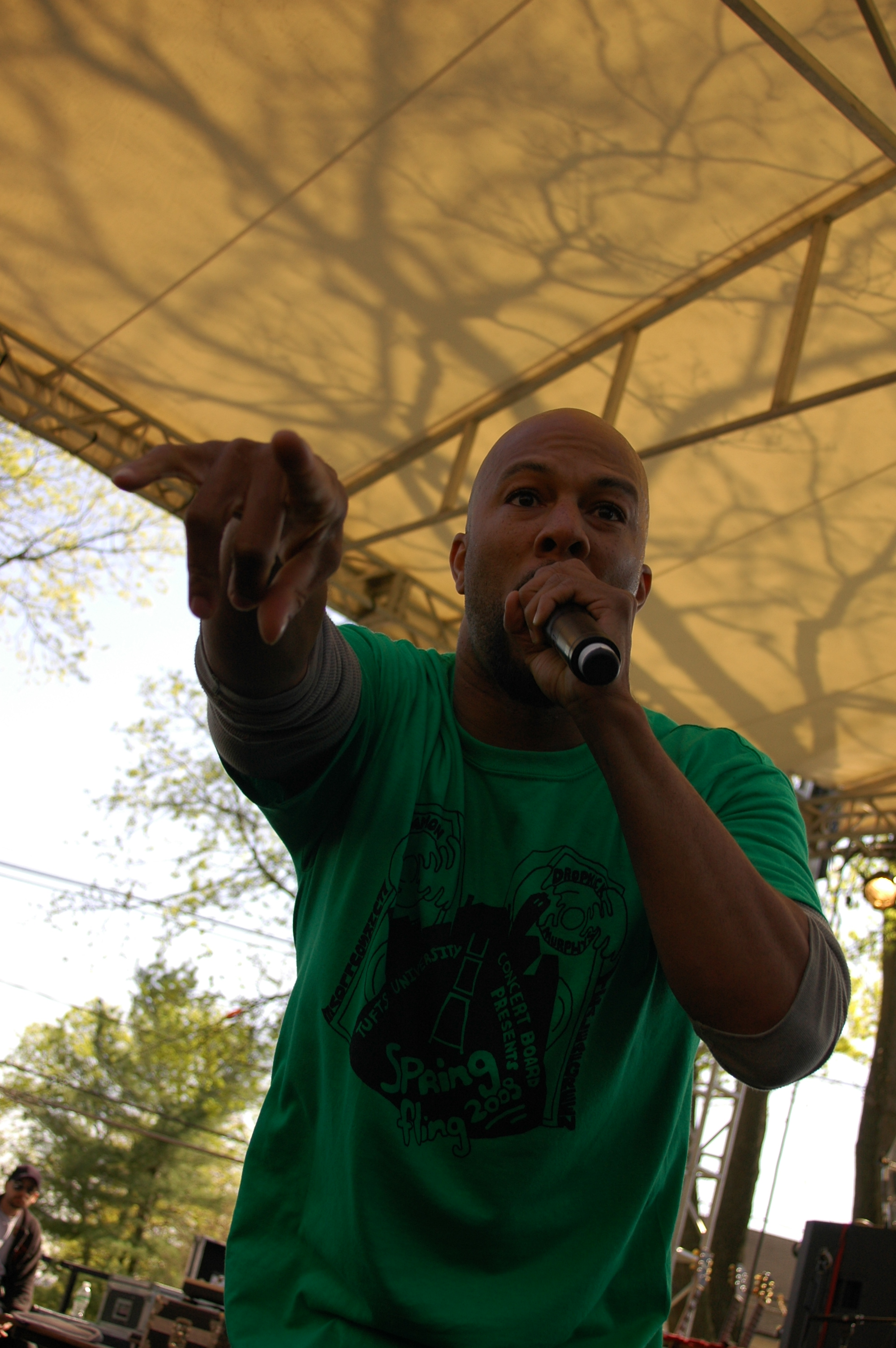
- Common performing at Tufts University Spring Fling, April 2008
- Studio albums: 14
- Compilation albums: 2
- Singles: 49
- Music videos: 21
- EPs: 2

The discography of Common, an American rapper, consists of fourteen studio albums, one collaborative album, one extended play, two compilation albums, forty-nine singles (including fifteen as a featured artist) and twenty-one music videos. It also contains the list of Common songs. Common sold more than 2.8 million albums in the United States. Common released his first album, Can I Borrow a Dollar? (1992), and follow suit with his second album, Resurrection, which met with critical acclaim, calling the album as one of the classic of the 90s. Common released his third album, One Day It'll All Make Sense, which was a little commercial success, follow suit with his fourth album, Like Water for Chocolate, which was met with critical acclaim from music critics, calling it the best rap album of the year. The album was also a commercial success certifying it gold by the Recording Industry Association of America (RIAA). His fifth studio album Electric Circus was met with acclaim from music critics. However, it failed to meet the commercial success with Like Water for Chocolate, which only peaked at number 47 on the US Billboard 200.

In 2005, he was helped by Kanye West to release his 6th album Be. West produced the whole album and was featured on it a few times. The album helped Common to get back into the spotlight and sold 185,000 copies in its first week debuting at number 2 on the charts and also it was Common's first album to have commercial success outside the US, peaking in several territories. The album was met with universal acclaim and it was described to be Common's best album. The album was certified gold and later platinum by the RIAA. His next album Finding Forever peaked at number one on the Billboard 200 being his first chart-topper. His next album Universal Mind Control sold 81,663 in its first week debuting at number 12. The album was promoted by the successful single "Universal Mind Control" which peaked at number 62 on the Billboard Hot 100. The album was met with mixed reviews. His next album The Dreamer/The Believer was met with positive reviews from music critics and debuted at number 18 on the charts, selling 70,000 copies in its first week and was promoted by five singles. In 2014 Common released his 10th album Nobody's Smiling which peaked at number 6 on the charts and had features from Big Sean and Vince Staples and others. In 2015 he collaborated with John Legend on the single "Glory" which peaked at number 49 on the Billboard Hot 100. The single was from the film Selma.

== Albums ==
=== Studio albums ===
List of studio albums, with selected chart positions, certifications and sales figures
Title	Album details	Peak chart positions										Certifications	Sales
Title	Album details	US	US R&B	US Rap	CAN	FRA	GER	IRE	NL	SWI	UK	Certifications	Sales
Can I Borrow a Dollar? (as Common Sense)	Released: October 6, 1992; Label: Relativity; Format: CD, LP, cassette, digital download	—	70	—	—	—	—	—	—	—	—		US: 131,000
Resurrection (as Common Sense)	Released: October 25, 1994; Label: Relativity; Format: CD, LP, cassette, digital download	178	27	—	—	—	—	—	—	—	—		US: 231,000
One Day It'll All Make Sense	Released: September 30, 1997; Label: Relativity; Format: CD, LP, cassette, digital download	61	12	—	—	—	—	—	—	—	—		US: 271,000
Like Water for Chocolate	Released: March 28, 2000; Label: MCA; Format: CD, LP, cassette, digital download	16	5	—	24	—	—	—	—	—	165	RIAA: Gold	US: 792,000
Electric Circus	Released: December 10, 2002; Label: MCA; Format: CD, LP, cassette, digital download	47	9	—	—	—	—	—	—	—	—		US: 305,000
Be	Released: May 24, 2005; Label: GOOD Music, Geffen; Format: CD, LP, digital download	2	1	1	10	102	93	61	73	26	38	RIAA: Platinum; BPI: Silver	US: 848,000
Finding Forever	Released: July 31, 2007; Label: GOOD Music, Geffen; Format: CD, LP, digital download	1	1	1	10	82	92	57	58	23	35	RIAA: Gold	
Universal Mind Control	Released: December 9, 2008; Label: GOOD Music, Geffen; Format: CD, LP, digital download	12	4	1	79	172	—	—	—	82	—		
The Dreamer/The Believer	Released: December 20, 2011; Label: Think Common, Warner Bros.; Format: CD, LP, digital download	18	5	4	—	—	—	—	—	—	196		
Nobody's Smiling	Released: July 22, 2014; Label: ARTium, Def Jam; Format: CD, LP, digital download	6	1	1	—	—	—	—	—	—	138		
Black America Again	Released: November 4, 2016; Label: ARTium, Def Jam; Format: CD, digital download	25	3	3	—	—	—	—	—	—	—		
Let Love	Released: August 30, 2019; Label: Loma Vista, Concord; Format: CD, LP, digital download	118	—	—	—	—	—	—	—	86	—		
A Beautiful Revolution Pt. 1	Released: October 30, 2020; Label: Loma Vista, Concord; Format: CD, LP, digital download	—	—	—	—	—	—	—	—	—	—		
A Beautiful Revolution Pt. 2	Released: September 10, 2021; Label: Loma Vista, Concord; Format: CD, LP, digital download	—	—	—	—	—	—	—	—	—	—		
"—" denotes a recording that did not chart or was not released in that territory.

=== Collaborative albums ===
List of collaborative albums, with selected details
Title	Album details
August Greene (with Robert Glasper and Karriem Riggins)	Released: March 5, 2018; Label: August Greene; Format: CD, LP, digital download
The Auditorium Vol. 1 (with Pete Rock)	Released: July 12, 2024; Label: Loma Vista, Concord; Format: CD, LP, cassette, digital download

=== Compilation albums ===
List of compilation albums, with selected chart positions
Title	Album details	Peak chart positions
Title	Album details	US R&B
Thisisme Then: The Best of Common	Released: November 17, 2007; Label: Relativity, Legacy; Format: CD, digital download	62
Go! – Common Classics	Released: May 11, 2010; Label: Geffen; Format: CD, digital download	—

== Singles ==
=== As lead artist ===
List of singles, with selected chart positions, showing year released and album name
Title	Year	Peak chart positions						Album
Title	Year	US	US R&B	US Rap	FRA	NL	UK	Album
"Take It EZ" (as Common Sense)	1992	—	—	5	—	—	—	Can I Borrow a Dollar?
"Breaker 1/9" (as Common Sense)	1992	—	—^{[A]}	10	—	—	—	Can I Borrow a Dollar?
"Soul by the Pound" (as Common Sense)	1993	—	—^{[B]}	7	—	—	—	Can I Borrow a Dollar?
"I Used to Love H.E.R." (as Common Sense)	1994	—	91	31	—	—	—	Resurrection
"Resurrection" (as Common Sense)	1995	—^{[C]}	88	22	—	—	—	Resurrection
"The Bitch in Yoo"	1996	—	—	—	—	—	—	Relativity Urban Assault
"Retrospect for Life" (featuring Lauryn Hill)	1997	—	—	—	—	—	—	One Day It'll All Make Sense
"Reminding Me (Of Sef)" (featuring Chantay Savage)	1997	—^{[D]}	57	9	—	—	59	One Day It'll All Make Sense
"All Night Long" (featuring Erykah Badu)	1998	—	—	—	—	—	—	One Day It'll All Make Sense
"One-Nine-Nine-Nine" (featuring Sadat X)	1999	—^{[E]}	41	4	—	—	—	Soundbombing II
"Car Horn" (featuring DJ Mark the 45 King)	1999	—	—	—	—	—	—	—N/a
"The 6th Sense"^{[F]} (featuring Bilal)	2000	—	87	14	—	—	56	Like Water for Chocolate
"The Light"^{[F]}	2000	44	12	13	97	83	56	Like Water for Chocolate
"Geto Heaven Remix T.S.O.I. (The Sound of Illadelph)" (featuring Macy Gray)	2001	—	61	—	—	—	48	Like Water for Chocolate
"Come Close"^{[G]} (featuring Mary J. Blige, or Erykah Badu, Pharrell and Q-Tip)	2002	65	21	18	—	—	—	Electric Circus
"The Food" (featuring Kanye West and DJ Dummy)	2004	—	—	—	—	—	—	Be
"The Corner" (featuring Kanye West and The Last Poets)	2005	—^{[H]}	42	—	—	—	134	Be
"Go!"	2005	79	31	21	—	—	79	Be
"Testify"	2005	—^{[I]}	44	—	—	—	—	Be
"Faithful" (featuring Bilal and John Legend)	2005	—	—	—	—	—	—	Be
"A Dream" (featuring will.i.am)	2007	—	—^{[J]}	—	—	—	108	Freedom Writers (soundtrack)
"The People" (featuring Dwele)	2007	—^{[K]}	55	—	—	—	—	Finding Forever
"The Game" (featuring DJ Premier)	2007	—	—	—	—	—	—	Finding Forever
"Drivin' Me Wild" (featuring Lily Allen)	2007	—	—	—	—	—	56	Finding Forever
"I Want You" (featuring will.i.am)	2007	—^{[L]}	32	21	—	—	—	Finding Forever
"Universal Mind Control" (featuring Pharrell)	2008	62	60	13	—	—	—	Universal Mind Control
"Announcement" (featuring Pharrell)	2008	—	94	—	—	—	—	Universal Mind Control
"Ghetto Dreams" (featuring Nas)	2011	—	—	—	—	—	—	The Dreamer / The Believer
"Blue Sky" (featuring Makeba Riddick)	2011	—	—	—	—	—	—	The Dreamer / The Believer
"Sweet"	2011	—	—	—	—	—	—	The Dreamer / The Believer
"Celebrate"	2011	—	95	—	—	—	—	The Dreamer / The Believer
"Raw (How You Like It)"	2011	—	—	—	—	—	—	The Dreamer / The Believer
"Kingdom" (featuring Vince Staples)	2014	—	—	—	—	—	—	Nobody's Smiling
"Speak My Piece"	2014	—	—	—	—	—	—	Nobody's Smiling
"Diamonds" (featuring Big Sean)	2014	—	—	—	—	—	—	Nobody's Smiling
"Glory" (with John Legend)	2014	49	18	11	—	—	62	Selma
"Real People" (with Ice Cube)	2016	—	—	—	—	—	—	Barbershop: The Next Cut soundtrack
"Love Star" (featuring Marsha Ambrosius and PJ)	2016	—	—	—	—	—	—	Black America Again
"Black America Again" (featuring Stevie Wonder)	2016	—	—	—	—	—	—	Black America Again
"Letter to the Free" (featuring Bilal)	2016	—	—	—	—	—	—	Black America Again
"Home" (featuring Bilal)	2016	—	—	—	—	—	—	Black America Again
"Pyramids"	2016	—	—	—	—	—	—	Black America Again
"Her Love" (featuring Daniel Caesar)	2019	—	—	—	—	—	—	Let Love
"Wise Up"	2024	—	—	—	—	—	—	The Auditorium Vol. 1
"Dreamin'"	2024	—	—	—	—	—	—	The Auditorium Vol. 1
"—" denotes a recording that did not chart or was not released in that territory.	2024							

=== As featured artist ===
List of singles, with selected chart positions, showing year released and album name
Title	Year	Peak chart positions					Album
Title	Year	US	US R&B	US Rap	AUS	UK	Album
"Out for the Cash (5 Deadly Venoms)" (DJ Honda featuring Common Sense, Beatnuts and Fat Joe)	1995						H
"Confusion" (Just Ro featuring Common Sense)	1996	—	—	—	—	—	Whatever It Takes
"Respiration" (Black Star featuring Common)	1999	—	54	6	—	—	Mos Def & Talib Kweli Are Black Star
"Full Moon" (Armand Van Helden featuring Common)	2000	—	—	—	—	133	Killing Puritans
"One Four Love (Part 1)" (Common, Kool G Rap, Rah Digga, Black Star, Posdnuos, Shabaam Sahdeeq, Pharoahe Monch and Sporty Thievz)	2000	—	—	85	—	—	Hip Hop for Respect
"The Sun God" (Hi-Tek featuring Common and Vinia Mojica)	2001	—	77	—	—	—	Hi-Teknology
"In the Sun" (Shaquille O'Neal featuring Common, Black Thought and Joi)	2001	—	—^{[N]}	—	—	—	Shaquille O'Neal Presents His Superfriends, Vol. 1
"Dance for Me" (Mary J. Blige featuring Common)	2001	—	—	—	66	13	No More Drama
"While I'm Dancin'" (Prime featuring Common)	2002	—	—	—	91	110	Clambake!
"Love of My Life (An Ode to Hip-Hop)" (Erykah Badu featuring Common)	2002	9	1	—	—	—	Brown Sugar (soundtrack)
"Where I'm Goin'" (Melanie Durrant featuring Common)	2003	—	—	—	—	—	—N/a
"Panthers" (Last Poets featuring Common and dead prez)	2004						—N/a
"Wouldn't You Like to Ride" (Malik Yusef featuring Kanye West and Common)	2005	—	—	—	—	—	The Great Chicago Fire; A Cold Day in Hell/Coach Carter (soundtrack)
"SupaStar" (Floetry featuring Common)	2005	—	55	—	—	—	Flo'Ology
"Tell Me What We're Gonna Do Now" (Joss Stone featuring Common)	2007	—	64	—	—	—	Introducing Joss Stone
"Make Her Say" (Kid Cudi featuring Kanye West and Common)	2009	43	39	11	62	67	Man on the Moon: The End of Day
"Wake Up Everybody" (John Legend and The Roots featuring Common and Melanie Fiona)	2010	—	53	—	—	179	Wake Up!
"Favorite Song" (Colbie Caillat featuring Common)	2012	—	—	—	—	—	All of You
"Switch Up" (Big Sean featuring Common)	2013	—	50	—	—	—	Hall of Fame
"Live for Today" (Stacy Barthe featuring Common)	2015	—	—	—	—	—	BEcoming
"Find Your Peace" (Keyon Harrold featuring Common and Robert Glasper)	2024						Foreverland
"What We Got In Common" (Busta Rhymes and J Dilla featuring Conmon and Jon Batiste)	2026						Dillagence 2
"—" denotes a recording that did not chart or was not released in that territory.

== Other charted songs ==
List of songs, with selected chart positions, showing year released and album name
Title	Year	Peak chart positions		Album
Title	Year	US	US R&B	Album
"The Light" (Remix) (featuring Erykah Badu)	2000	—	—^{[O]}	Bamboozled soundtrack
"Decision" (Busta Rhymes featuring Jamie Foxx, Mary J. Blige, John Legend and Common)	2009	—	—^{[P]}	Back on My B.S.
"The Morning" (with Raekwon, Pusha T, 2 Chainz, Cyhi the Prynce, Kid Cudi and D'banj)	2012	—^{[Q]}	49	Cruel Summer
"—" denotes a recording that did not chart.

== Guest appearances ==
List of non-single guest appearances, with other performing artists, showing year released and album name
Title	Year	Other performer(s)	Album
"Interlude"	1995	DJ Honda	DJ Honda
"90 in the Red (Interlude)"	1996	Chantay Savage	I Will Survive (Doin' It My Way)
"I Will Survive (Extended Remix)"	1996	Chantay Savage	Non-album single
"Tha Bizness"	1996	De La Soul	Stakes Is High
"The Remedy"	1996	A Tribe Called Quest	Get on the Bus (soundtrack)
"U-N-I-Verse at War"	1996	The Roots	Illadelph Halflife
"High Expectations"	1997	—N/a	Soul in the Hole (soundtrack)
"State to State"	1997	No I.D., Dug Infinite	Accept Your Own and Be Yourself (The Black Album)
"Live from the DJ Stretch Armstrong Show with Your Host Bobbito the Barber"	1998	Black Thought, Pharoahe Monch, Absolute	Lyricist Lounge, Volume One
"Verbal Muder 2"	1998	Pete Rock, Big Pun, Noreaga	Soul Survivor
"Maybe One Day"	1998	Brand Nubian	Foundation
"Interview 1"	1998	Kid Capri, Joe Clair	Soundtrack to the Streets
"Los Angeles Times Freestyle"	1998	Funkmaster Flex	The Mix Tape, Vol. III
"Act Too (The Love of My Life)"	1999	The Roots	Things Fall Apart
"8 Minutes to Sunrise"	1999	Jill Scott	Wild Wild West (soundtrack)
"Jam"	1999	Alliance Ethnik	Fat Comeback
"Don't Come My Way"	1999	Slick Rick, Renee Neufville	Whiteboys (soundtrack)
"Play Dis (99 Remix)	1999	Saukrates	The Underground Tapes
"Slam Pit"	1999	The Beatnuts, Cuban Link	A Musical Massacre
"The Truth"	1999	Pharoahe Monch, Talib Kweli	Internal Affairs
"Thelonius"	2000	Slum Village	Fantastic, Vol. 2
"The Light" (Remix)	2000	Erykah Badu	Bamboozled (soundtrack)
"Hurricane"	2000	The Roots, Mos Def, Dice Raw, Flo Brown, Jazzyfatnastees	The Hurricane (Soundtrack)
"Any Given Sunday"	2000	Jamie Foxx, Guru	Any Given Sunday (soundtrack)
"No Competition"	2000	DJ Skribble	Traffic Jams 2000
"Funk Shit"	2000	Marley Marl	Hip Hop Dictionary
"Reminisce"	2001	Bilal, Mos Def	1st Born Second
"Embrace the Chaos"	2001	Ozomatli	Embrace the Chaos
"Missing Link"	2001	Femi Kuti	Fight to Win
Tears + Sorrow	2002	Meshell Ndegeocello, Djelimady Tounkara	Red Hot + Riot
"Common Free Style"	2003	The RH Factor	Hard Groove
"Real Compared to What"	2003	Mýa	Moodring
"A Freestyle Song"	2003	KRS-One	D.I.G.I.T.A.L.
"Get Em High"	2004	Kanye West, Talib Kweli	The College Dropout
"Revelations 3:8 Introduction"	2004	Teena Marie	La Doña
"Yelling Away"	2004	Zap Mama, Talib Kweli, Questlove	Ancestry in Progress
"Days of Our Lives"	2004	De La Soul	The Grind Date
"Ghetto Show"	2004	Talib Kweli, Anthony Hamilton	The Beautiful Struggle
"Enough Beef"	2005	Sway & King Tech, Royce da 5'9", Chino XL	Back 2 Basics
"My Way Home"	2005	Kanye West	Late Registration
"We Can Make It Better"	2005	Kanye West, Q-Tip, Talib Kweli, Rhymefest	Late Registration (UK Version)
"U Still Got It (Interlude)"	2005	Jamie Foxx	Unpredictable
"Bulls-Eye (Suddenly)"	2005	Syleena Johnson	Chapter 3: The Flesh
"Back Home"	2005	Fort Minor, Styles of Beyond	The Rising Tied
"Love It or Leave It Alone"	2005	Alicia Keys, Damian Marley, Mos Def	Unplugged
"The Movement"	2005	—N/a	2K6: The Tracks
"Nostalgia"	2005	Abstract Mindstate	Chicago's Hardest Working Mixtape Vol.2 (Project Soul)
"The Corner" (Remix)	2006	Scarface, Kanye West, The Last Poets, Mos Def	My Homies Part 2
"Goodlife"	2006	T.I., Pharrell	King
"Gimme Sum (Rap)"	2006	Omar Lye-Fook, Rodney P, Ashman, Cantibe	Sing If You Want It
"E=MC²"	2006	J Dilla	The Shining
"So Far to Go"	2006	J Dilla, D'Angelo	The Shining
"State of Clarity"	2007	Guru, Bob James	Guru's Jazzmatazz, Vol. 4: The Hip Hop Jazz Messenger: Back to the Future
"So Far So Good"	2008	Skillz	The Million Dollar Backpack
"Angel"	2008	The Game	LAX
"The Show"	2008	The Roots, Dice Raw	Rising Down
"Do the Right Thang"	2008	Ludacris, Spike Lee	Theater of the Mind
"Decision"	2009	Busta Rhymes, Jamie Foxx, Mary J. Blige, John Legend	Back on My B.S.
"Don't Charge Me for the Crime"	2009	Jonas Brothers	Lines, Vines and Trying Times
"Good Friday"	2010	Kanye West, Pusha T, Kid Cudi, Big Sean, Charlie Wilson	GOOD Fridays release
"The Morning"	2012	Raekwon, Pusha T, 2 Chainz, Cyhi the Prynce, Kid Cudi, D'banj	Cruel Summer
"My Way"	2012	DJ Drama, Lloyd, Kendrick Lamar	Quality Street Music
"Jesus Piece"	2012	Game, Kanye West	Jesus Piece
"Strange Fruit (Remix)"	2012	Fashawn, John Legend	Higher Learning Vol. 2
"XOX"	2012	Elijah Blake	Bijoux 22
"Fly Ass Pisces"	2013	Cocaine 80s, Jhené Aiko	Flower of Life
"Make Something"	2013	Hit-Boy, Kent M$ney, K. Roosevelt	All I've Ever Dreamed Of
"Live Today"	2013	Derrick Hodge	Live Today
"Feel Like (Love Love)"	2013	Rapsody	She Got Game
"I Stand Alone"	2013	Robert Glasper, Patrick Stump	Black Radio 2
"Quicksand"	2013	Yancey Boys, Dezi Paige	Sunset Blvd.
"Pretty Bird (Freestyle)"	2014	Jhené Aiko	Souled Out
"Sunshine" (Remix)	2014	Wale, Rick Ross	—N/a
"Remission"	2014	Lupe Fiasco, Jennifer Hudson	—N/a
"Bad Things"	2014	Snoh Aalegra	There Will Be Sunshine
"When Rivers Cry"	2014	Somi	The Lagos Music Salon
"Wishin'"	2014	PRhyme (Royce da 5'9" & DJ Premier)	PRhyme
"Fight or Flight" (Remix)	2014	Lil Herb, Chance the Rapper	—N/a
"We Are Young Gifted and Black"	2015	Lalah Hathaway	Nina Revisited
"Who Tells Your Story"	2016	Lin-Manuel Miranda, The Roots, Ingrid Michaelson	The Hamilton Mixtape
"Speak to Em"	2016	Lil Bibby	Free Crack 3
"Teleprompters"	2017	Talib Kweli, Styles P, Little Vic	The Seven
"Stand Up for Something"	2017	Andra Day	Marshall (soundtrack)
"Sabor Do Rio"	2019	Sérgio Mendes	In the Key of Joy
"Signs"	2019	Jordan Rakei	Origin
"Reverie"	2020	Disclosure	Energy
"Golden Ticket"	2020	Brasstracks	Golden Ticket
"He Loves Me"	2021	Brittany Howard, 9th Wonder	Jaime (Reimagined)
"Worship & Justice"	2022	William Murphy	Worship & Justice
"Outcome X"	2022	Bobby Gonz	In the Journal of My Journey
"Never Lie to You"	2023	Mumu Fresh	Vintage Babies
"Oblivion"	2023	Noname, Ayoni	Sundial
"Southside Story"	2023	Vic Mensa	Victor
"Back Benchers"	2024	Honey Khattra	Back Benchers
"Change Your Ways"	2024	MC Lyte, Stevie Wonder	1 of 1
"Yours"	2025	De La Soul, Slick Rick	Cabin in the Sky

== Videography ==
=== Music videos ===
Year	Title	Director(s)
1992	"Take It EZ"	
1993	"Breaker 1/9"	
1993	"Soul by the Pound"	Rolando Hudson
1994	"I Used to Love H.E.R."	Chris Halliburton
1995	"Resurrection"	Nick Quested
1995	"Out for the Cash" (DJ Honda featuring Common Sense, Fat Joe & The Beatnuts)	
1996	"Confusion" (Just Ro featuring Common Sense)	
1997	"Retrospect for Life"	Lauryn Hill
1997	"Reminding Me (of Sef)"	Darren Grant
1997	"Invocation"	
1997	"Hungry"	
1998	"Respiration" (Black Star featuring Common)	
1999	"One-Nine-Nine-Nine" (with Sadat X)	Betsy Blakemore
2000	"The 6th Sense"	Andrew Dosunmu
2000	"Heat"	Brian Meehan
2000	"The Light"	Nzingha Stewart
2000	"Geto Heaven Remix T.S.O.I."	Nzingha Stewart
2001	"Dance for Me" (Mary J. Blige featuring Common)	
2002	"Come Close"	Sanaa Hamri & ?uestlove
2003	"Where I'm Goin'" (Melanie Durrant featuring Common)	
2004	"Wouldn't You Like to Ride?" (Malik Yusef featuring Common and Kanye)	
2005	"The Corner"	Kanye West
2005	"Go!"	Kanye West, MK12, Convert
2005	"SUpaStar" (Floetry featuring Common)	
2005	"Be"	Paul Hunter
2005	"Testify"	Anthony Mandler
2006	"A Dream"	Nabil Elderkin
2007	"Won't Do"	Illa J
2007	"The Game"	NEON
2007	"The People"	NEON
2007	"Tell Me What We're Gonna Do Now" (Joss Stone featuring Common)	
2007	"Drivin' Me Wild"	Chris Robinson
2008	"I Want You"	Kerry Washington, Sanji
2008	"Universal Mind Control"	Hype Williams
2009	"Universal Mind Control" (Version 2)	Katt Brown
2009	"Make My Day"	Josh Milowe
2009	"Make Her Say" (Kid Cudi featuring Common)	
2010	"Wake Up Everybody" (The Roots & John Legend featuring Common)	
2011	"Ghetto Dreams"	Matt Alonzo
2011	"Blue Sky"	Paris
2011	"Sweet"	Phil the God
2011	"Celebrate"	Phil the God
2012	"Raw (How You Like It)"	Phil the God
2012	"Favorite Song" (Colbie Coillatt featuring Common)	
2013	"Switch Up" (Big Sean featuring Common)	
2013	"X.O.X." (Elijah Blake featuring Common)	
2014	"Kingdom"	Hype Williams
2014	"Diamonds"	Jerome D
2015	"Glory"	Paramount Pictures
2016	"Real People"	Marc Wood
2016	"Black America Again"	
2017	"Stand Up for Something" (Andra Day featuring Common)	
2020	"Say Peace"	A.G. Rojas and Darol Olu Kae
2021	"When We Move"	Emmanuel Afolabi
2023	"In Moe (Speculation)" (with DJ Premier)	
2024	"Wise Up"	Marleaux Desiré
2024	"All Kinds of Ideas"	
2024	"Fortunate"	
2024	"Dreamin'"	Raven Jackson
2024	"When the Sun Shines Again"	

== Notes ==
- A "Breaker 1/9" did not enter the Hot R&B/Hip-Hop Songs chart, but peaked at number 7 on the Bubbling Under Hot R&B/Hip-Hop Singles chart, which acts as a 25-song extension to the Hot R&B/Hip-Hop Songs chart.
- B "Soul by the Pound" did not enter the Hot R&B/Hip-Hop Songs chart, but peaked at number 8 on the Bubbling Under Hot R&B/Hip-Hop Singles chart, which acts as a 25-song extension to the Hot R&B/Hip-Hop Songs chart.
- C "Resurrection" did not enter the Billboard Hot 100, but peaked at number 2 on the Bubbling Under Hot 100 Singles chart, which acts as a 25-song extension to the Hot 100.
- D "Reminding Me (Of Sef)" did not enter the Billboard Hot 100, but peaked at number 1 on the Bubbling Under Hot 100 Singles chart, which acts as a 25-song extension to the Hot 100.
- E "One-Nine-Nine-Nine" did not enter the Billboard Hot 100, but peaked at number 10 on the Bubbling Under Hot 100 Singles chart, which acts as a 25-song extension to the Hot 100.
- F "The 6th Sense" and "The Light" charted as a double A-side single in the United Kingdom.
- G Two single versions of "Come Close" were released: the first features Mary. J Blige, and the second features Erykah Badu, Pharrell and Q-Tip.
- H "The Corner" did not enter the Billboard Hot 100, but peaked at number 10 on the Bubbling Under Hot 100 Singles chart, which acts as a 25-song extension to the Hot 100.
- I "Testify" did not enter the Billboard Hot 100, but peaked at number 9 on the Bubbling Under Hot 100 Singles chart, which acts as a 25-song extension to the Hot 100.
- J "A Dream" did not enter the Hot R&B/Hip-Hop Songs chart, but peaked at number 16 on the Bubbling Under Hot R&B/Hip-Hop Singles chart, which acts as a 25-song extension to the Hot R&B/Hip-Hop Songs chart.
- K "The People" did not enter the Billboard Hot 100, but peaked at number 11 on the Bubbling Under Hot 100 Singles chart, which acts as a 25-song extension to the Hot 100.
- L "I Want You" did not enter the Billboard Hot 100, but peaked at number 12 on the Bubbling Under Hot 100 Singles chart, which acts as a 25-song extension to the Hot 100.
- M "The Bizness" did not enter the Billboard Hot 100, but peaked at number 1 on the Bubbling Under Hot 100 Singles chart, which acts as a 25-song extension to the Hot 100.
- N "In the Sun" did not enter the Hot R&B/Hip-Hop Songs chart, but peaked at number 9 on the Bubbling Under Hot R&B/Hip-Hop Singles chart, which acts as a 25-song extension to the Hot R&B/Hip-Hop Songs chart.
- O "The Light" (Remix) did not enter the Hot R&B/Hip-Hop Songs chart, but peaked at number 17 on the Bubbling Under Hot R&B/Hip-Hop Singles chart, which acts as a 25-song extension to the Hot R&B/Hip-Hop Songs chart.
- P "Decision" did not enter the Hot R&B/Hip-Hop Songs chart, but peaked at number 10 on the Bubbling Under Hot R&B/Hip-Hop Singles chart, which acts as a 25-song extension to the Hot R&B/Hip-Hop Songs chart.
- Q "The Morning" did not enter the Billboard Hot 100, but peaked at number 19 on the Bubbling Under Hot 100 Singles chart, which acts as a 25-song extension to the Hot 100.
