= Common (rapper) =

American rapper and actor (born 1972)

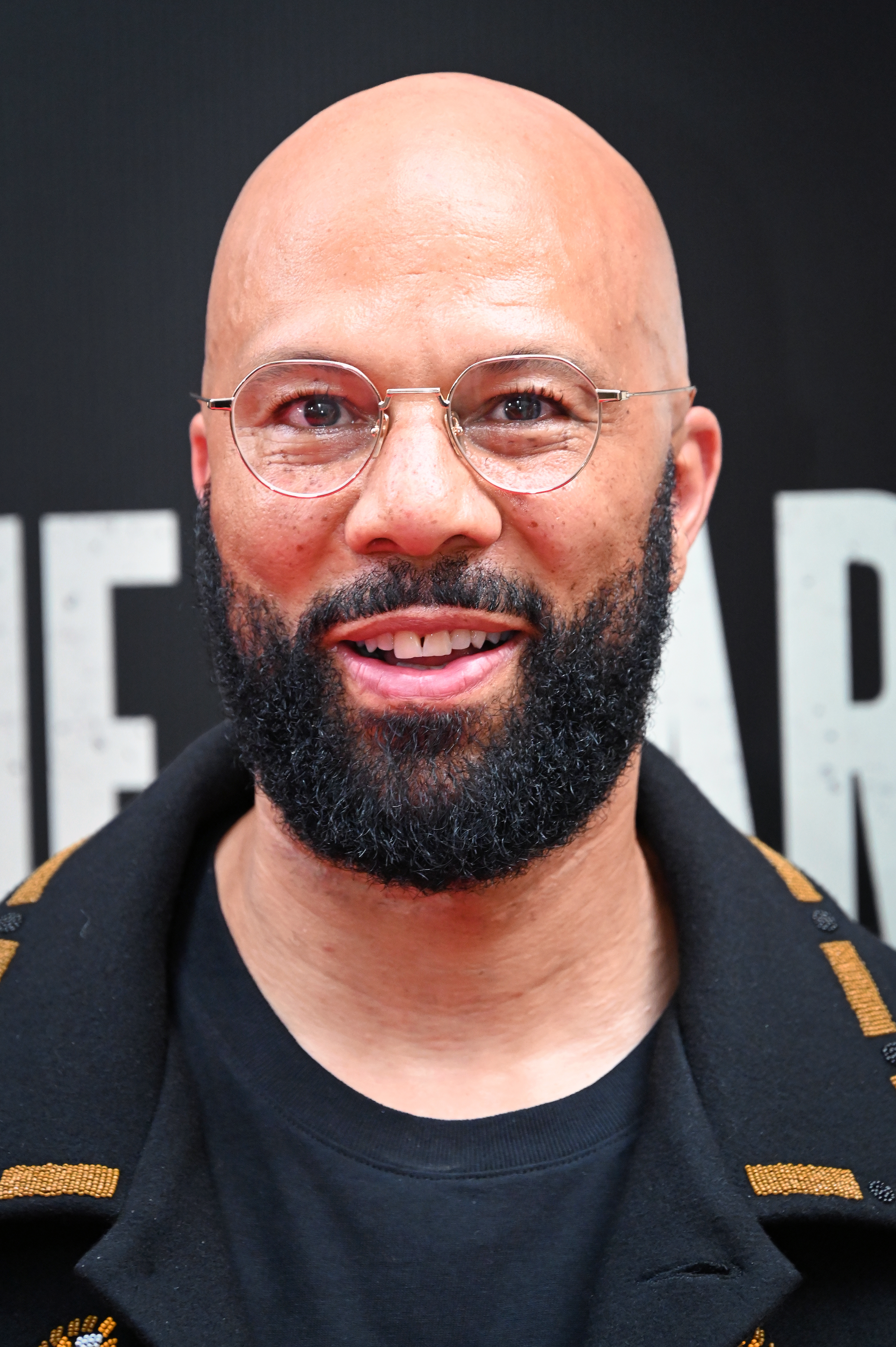
- Common in 2026
- Born: Lonnie Rashid Lynn; March 13, 1972 (age 54); Chicago, Illinois, U.S.
- Other name: Common Sense
- Occupations: Rapper; songwriter; actor; activist
- Years active: 1987–present
- Works: Discography; filmography
- Partner: Jennifer Hudson (2022–present)
- Children: 1
- Parents: Lonnie Lynn (father); Mahalia Ann Hines (mother)
- Awards: Full list
- Musical career
- Genres: Midwestern hip-hop; neo soul
- Instruments: Vocals
- Labels: Loma Vista; Concord; Think Common; ARTium; Def Jam; Virgin EMI; Warner Bros.; Geffen; GOOD; MCA; Warlock; Rawkus; Relativity
- Member of: August Greene; Cocaine 80s; Soulquarians
- Website: thinkcommon.com

Lonnie Rashid Lynn (born March 13, 1972), known professionally as Common (formerly known as Common Sense), is an American rapper and actor. Common has achieved three Grammy Awards, an Academy Award, a Primetime Emmy Award, and a Golden Globe Award. He has also acted on Broadway.

Common signed with the independent label Relativity Records at the age of 20. The label released his first three studio albums: Can I Borrow a Dollar? (1992), Resurrection (1994) and One Day It'll All Make Sense (1997). He maintained an underground hip-hop following into the late 1990s, and achieved mainstream success through his work with the Black music collective Soulquarians.

After attaining a major label record deal with now-defunct MCA Records, he released his fourth and fifth albums, Like Water for Chocolate (2000) and Electric Circus (2002).

Common guest performed on fellow Soulquarian Erykah Badu's 2003 single, "Love of My Life (An Ode to Hip-Hop)", which became his highest entry — at number nine — on the Billboard Hot 100 and won Best R&B Song at the 45th Annual Grammy Awards.

Not long after, Common signed with fellow Chicago rapper Kanye West's record label GOOD Music, in a joint venture with Geffen Records to release his sixth and seventh albums Be (2005) and Finding Forever (2007); both were nominated for Best Rap Album Grammys, while the latter became his first to debut atop the Billboard 200 and contained the song "Southside" (featuring Kanye West), the recipient of Best Rap Performance by a Duo or Group at the 50th Annual Grammy Awards. His eighth album, Universal Mind Control (2008), was met with a critical decline and served as his final release with GOOD Music.

Common's label imprint, Think Common Entertainment, was founded in 2011 and entered a joint venture with Warner Bros. Records to release his ninth album, The Dreamer/The Believer (2011), and later No I.D.'s ARTium Recordings, an imprint of Def Jam Recordings to release his tenth album, Nobody's Smiling (2014). Both received critical praise and further discussed social issues in Black America; his eleventh album, Black America Again (2016) saw widespread critical acclaim.

Common eventually signed with Loma Vista Recordings, and released his twelfth album Let Love (2019), thirteenth album A Beautiful Revolution Pt. 1 (2020), and fourteenth album A Beautiful Revolution Pt. 2 (2021), to positive reviews. He also worked with Karriem Riggins and Robert Glasper on the album August Greene (2018) under the supergroup of the same name, and with Pete Rock on the album The Auditorium Vol. 1 (2024).

Common, along with John Legend, won an Academy Award in 2015 for Best Original Song for their song "Glory", which was included in the film Selma (2014), a film he also co-starred in (in the role of civil rights leader James Bevel).

Common's film roles include Smokin' Aces (2006), Street Kings (2008), American Gangster (2007), Wanted (2008), Date Night (2010), Just Wright (2010), Happy Feet Two (2011), Now You See Me (2013), Run All Night (2015), John Wick: Chapter 2 (2017), Smallfoot (2018), Alice (2022), and Fool's Paradise (2023).

In television, he starred as Elam Ferguson in AMC western series Hell on Wheels from 2011 to 2014, and has played a supporting role in the Apple TV+ science fiction series Silo since 2023.

His song "Letter to the Free" was released for the Ava DuVernay-directed Netflix documentary 13th (2017), for which he won the Primetime Emmy Award for Outstanding Original Music and Lyrics.

He made his Broadway acting debut in the play Between Riverside and Crazy (2023), which won a Pulitzer Prize for Drama.

== Early life and education ==
Lonnie Rashid Lynn was born on March 13, 1972, at the Chicago Osteopathic Hospital in Chicago, Illinois. He is the son of Mahalia Ann Hines (an educator, and former principal of John Hope College Preparatory High School) and Lonnie Lynn (a former ABA basketball player turned youth counselor).

Lonnie Rashid Lynn shares the same first name, Lonnie, as his father, grandfather, great-grandfather and great-great-grandfather. He is known by his middle name, Rashid, to his family and friends. Lynn's godfather is basketball player Spencer Haywood, who was a teammate of his father on the Denver Rockets.

Lynn was raised in the Calumet Heights neighborhood. His father left the family because of his drug and alcohol addictions while Lynn was young. When he was aged two, Lynn's father attempted to take him and his mother to Seattle, where he had arranged a tryout for himself with the Seattle SuperSonics. His father was arrested when the family stopped at a motel in Wisconsin; his father was then charged with false imprisonment.

Lynn's parents divorced in the late 1970s, at which point his father moved to Denver, Colorado. This left Lynn to be raised by his mother. Lynn's father remained active in his life and, when Common was 11, was able to get him a job as a ballboy with the Chicago Bulls; this also gave the boy the opportunity to witness Michael Jordan's first professional exhibition game. Lynn attended Florida A&M University (FAMU) for two years under a scholarship, where he majored in business administration, but he did not graduate.

== Music career ==
Common's music has embraced several styles, including Midwestern hip-hop, neo soul and progressive rap.

=== 1987–1996: Career beginnings ===
Lynn began rapping in the late 1980s, while a student at Luther High School South in Chicago, when he, along with two of his friends, formed C.D.R., a rap trio that opened for acts such as N.W.A and Big Daddy Kane. C.D.R dissolved by 1991, and Lynn began a solo career under the stage name of Common Sense. After being featured in the Unsigned Hype column of The Source magazine, he debuted as a solo artist in 1992 with the single "Take It EZ", followed by the album Can I Borrow a Dollar?.

With the 1994 release of Resurrection, Common Sense achieved a much larger degree of critical acclaim which extended beyond the Chicago music scene. The album sold relatively well and received a strong positive reaction among alternative hip-hop and underground hip-hop fans at the time. Resurrection was Common Sense's last album produced almost entirely by his long-time production partner, No I.D., who would later become a mentor to a young Kanye West.

In 1996, Common Sense appeared on the Red Hot Organization's compilation CD, America Is Dying Slowly (A.I.D.S.), alongside Biz Markie, Wu-Tang Clan, and Fat Joe, among many other prominent hip-hop artists. The CD, meant to raise awareness of the HIV/AIDS epidemic among African American men, was heralded as "a masterpiece" by The Source magazine. He would later also contribute to the Red Hot Organization's Fela Kuti tribute album, Red Hot and Riot in 2002. He collaborated with Djelimady Tounkara on a remake of Kuti's track, "Years of Tears and Sorrow".

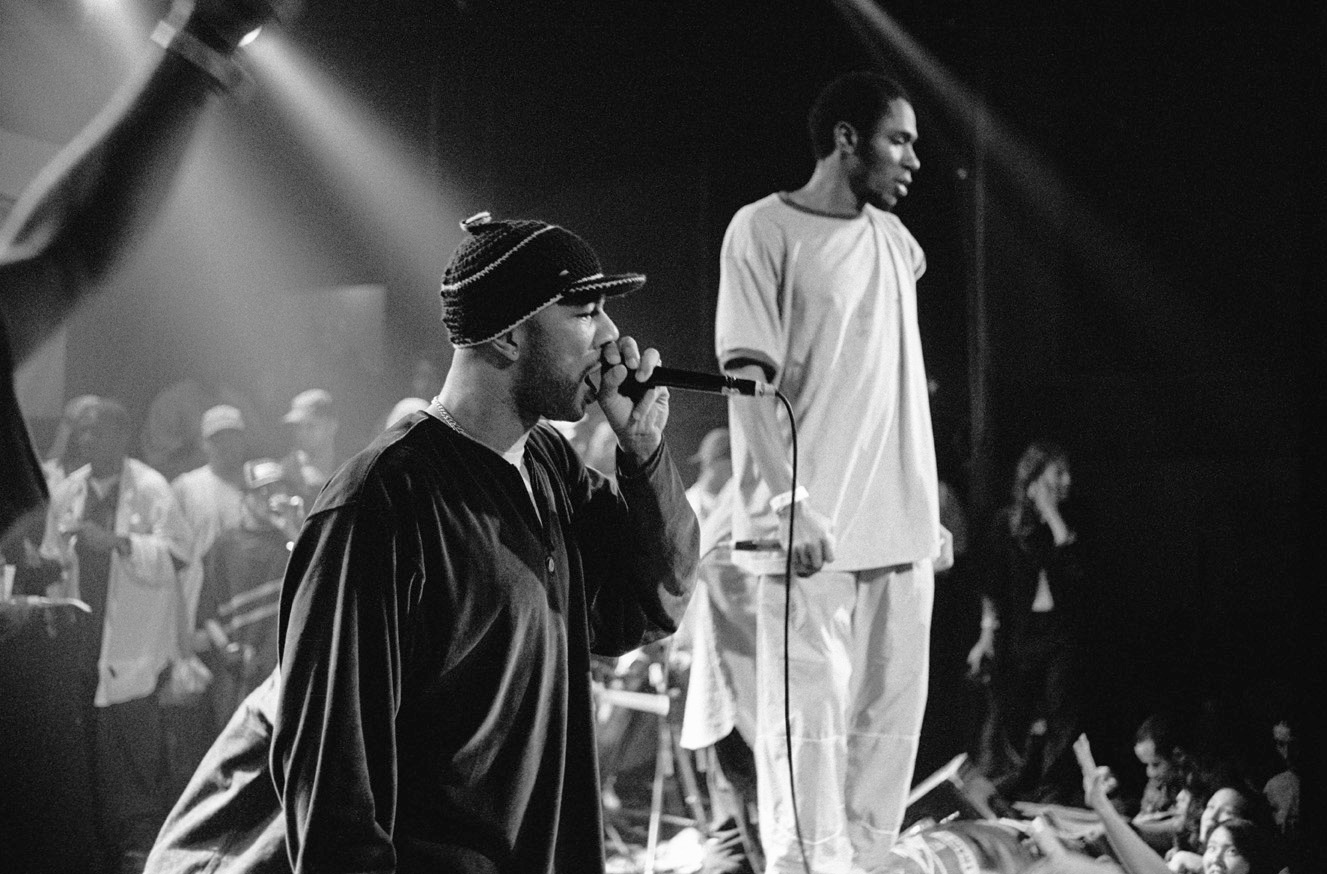
Common performing with Mos Def in 1999

The song "I Used to Love H.E.R." from Resurrection ignited a feud with West Coast rap group Westside Connection. The lyrics of the song criticized the path hip-hop music was taking, using a metaphor of a woman to convey hip-hop, and were interpreted by some as directing blame towards the popularity of West Coast gangsta rap. Westside Connection first responded with the 1995 song "Westside Slaughterhouse," with the lyrics "Used to love H.E.R., mad cause I fucked her". "Westside Slaughterhouse" also mentioned Common Sense by name, prompting the rapper to respond with the scathing Pete Rock-produced attack song "The Bitch in Yoo". Common Sense and Westside Connection continued to insult each other back and forth before finally meeting with Louis Farrakhan and setting aside their dispute. Following the popularity of Resurrection, Common Sense was sued by an Orange County-based reggae band also going by the name Common Sense, and he was forced to shorten his moniker to simply Common.

=== 1996–1999: One Day It'll All Make Sense ===
Initially scheduled for an October 1996 release, Common released his third album, One Day It'll All Make Sense, in September 1997. The album took a total of two years to complete and included collaborations with artists such as Lauryn Hill, De La Soul, Q-Tip, Canibus, Black Thought, Chantay Savage, and Questlove — a future fellow member of the Soulquarians outfit. The album, which made a point of eschewing any gangsterism (in response to questions about his musical integrity), was critically acclaimed and led to a major label contract with MCA Records. In addition to releasing One Day, Common's first child, daughter Omoye Assata Lynn, was born shortly after the release of the album.

As documented by hip-hop journalist Raquel Cepeda, in the liner notes for the album, this event had a profound spiritual and mental effect on Common and enabled him to grow musically while becoming more responsible as an artist. She writes:

Rashid found out that he was going to become a daddy in about 8 months. Stunned and confused, Rashid had life-altering decisions to make with his girlfriend, Kim Jones. The situation led to the composition of his favorite cut on One Day... that offers a male slant on abortion. "Retrospect for Life", produced by James Poyser and No I.D. featuring Lauryn Hill (who was due on the same day as Rashid's girlfriend), is the song that is the driving force behind the project. Rashid listens to "Retrospect for Life" today at the mastering session geeked as if it were for the first time. He tells me as we listen to L-Boogie wail the chorus, "when I listen to the song now, I think about how precious her (Omoye's) life is".

Common addresses family ethics several times on One Day..., and the album sleeve is decorated with old family photos, illustrating the rapper's childhood, as well a quote from 1 Corinthians 13:11, which summarizes the path to manhood:

When I was a child, I talked like a child, I thought like a child, I reasoned like a child. When I became a man, I put childish ways behind me.

=== 1999–2003: Soulquarians era ===
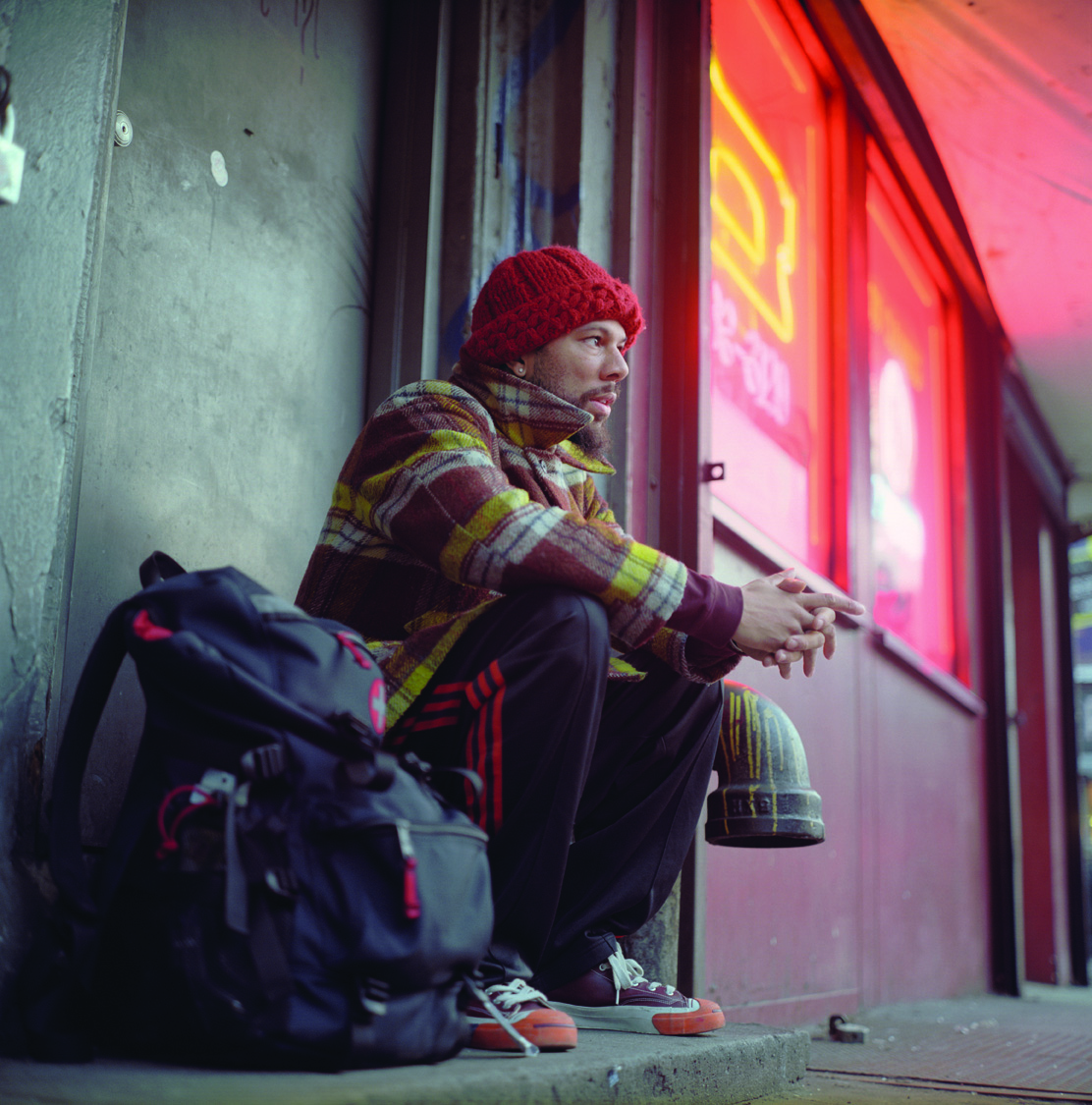
Common in New York City, 2003

Following One Day..., Common signed a major label record deal with MCA Records and relocated from Chicago to New York City in 1999. He began recording almost exclusively with a loose collective of musicians and artists (dubbed the "Soulquarians" by central figure Questlove) throughout 1999, and made a few sporadic guest appearances on The Roots' Things Fall Apart, and the Rawkus Records compilation, Soundbombing 2.

In 2000, his fourth album, Like Water for Chocolate, was released to mass critical acclaim. Executive produced by Questlove and featuring significant contributions by J Dilla, (who helmed every track except — "Cold Blooded", "Geto Heaven Part II", "A Song For Assata", "Pop's Rap Part 3...All My Children" & the DJ Premier-produced track "The 6th Sense"), Like Water for Chocolate transpired to be a considerable commercial breakthrough for Common, earning the rapper his first gold record, and greatly expanding his fanbase among critics and listeners alike.

With both artists hailing from the Great Lakes region of the United States (Chicago and Detroit, respectively), Common and J Dilla established their chemistry early on. Both became members of the Soulquarians collective, and collaborated on numerous projects together, even placing one song, "Thelonius", on both the Slum Village album Fantastic, Vol. 2, and Common's Like Water for Chocolate. As Dilla's health began to decline from the effects of Lupus Nephritis, he relocated to Los Angeles, and asked Common to make the move with him as a roommate (Dilla would later lose his battle with the rare disease).

This album saw Common exploring themes (musically and lyrically), which were uncommon for a hip-hop record, as he does on the song "Time Travelin' (A Tribute To Fela)"; a homage to Nigerian music legend, and political activist Fela Kuti. The most popular single from the album "The Light" was nominated for a Grammy Award.

In 2002, Common released his fifth album, Electric Circus. The album was highly anticipated and praised by many critics for its ambitious vision. However, it was not as commercially successful as his previous album, Like Water for Chocolate, selling under 300,000 copies. An eclectic album, Electric Circus featured fusions of several genres such as hip-hop, pop, rock, electronic, and neo-soul. The album's style tended to divide critics; some praised its ambitious vision while others criticized it for the same reason. Most of the criticism tended to revolve around the album's experimental nature; some felt Common had strayed too far from his previous sound. This was Common's second and last album for MCA, and the label's final release prior to its absorption into Geffen Records.

Around this time, Common appeared as a guest performer on singer and fellow Soulquarian Bilal's Love for Sale album, recording a remake of the 1977 Fela Kuti song "Sorrow, Tears & Blood". Bilal also featured on Electric Circus, the first of many future collaborations with Common.

=== 2004–2011: GOOD Music era ===
In early 2004, Common made an appearance on fellow Chicagoan Kanye West's multi-platinum debut album, The College Dropout (on the song "Get Em High"), and announced his signing to West's then-newfound label GOOD Music. West had been a longtime fan of Common and the two even participated in a friendly on-air MC battle, where West took jabs at his lyrical idol for "going soft" and wearing crochet pants (as he does for his appearance in the video for the Mary J. Blige song "Dance for Me"). The pair worked together on Common's next album, Be, almost entirely produced by Kanye West, with some help from Common's longtime collaborator James Yancey (J Dilla) — also a favorite of West. The album was released in May 2005, and performed very well, boosted by Kanye's involvement and the singles "The Corner", and "Go". Be earned Common the second gold record of his career, with sales topping out at around 800,000 copies. The Source magazine gave it a near-perfect 4.5 mic rating, XXL magazine gave it their highest rating of "XXL", and AllHipHop gave the album 4 stars. The album was also nominated for four Grammy Awards in 2006.

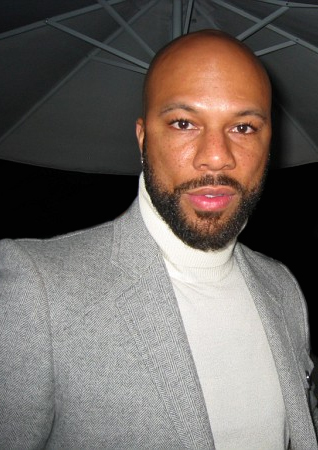
Common in 2006

Following the release of Be in 2005, several mixed-race artists from the UK hip-hop scene took exception to Common's comments about interracial relationships on the song "Real People." Yungun, Doc Brown and Rising Son recorded a track over an instrumental version of "The Corner" named "Dear Common (The Corner Dub)." Common states that he has heard of the track but never actually taken the time to listen to it, and has not retaliated in song.

Common's seventh LP titled Finding Forever was released on July 31, 2007. For this album, he continued his work with Kanye West, as well as other producers such as Will.i.am, Devo Springsteen, Derrick Hodge, and Karriem Riggins, as well as the only J Dilla-produced track, "So Far To Go". The album features guest spots from artists such as Dwele, Bilal, D'Angelo, and UK pop starlet Lily Allen. The first single from the album was "The People" b/w "The Game". West predicted that Finding Forever would win the 2008 Grammy Award for Best Rap Album. The album was nominated for Best Rap Album, but did not win, losing to West's Graduation; however, Common did win his second Grammy for "Southside," which won the 2008 Grammy for Best Rap Performance by Duo or Group. On July 31, 2007, Common performed a free concert in Santa Monica, California, on the 3rd Street Promenade to promote the release of Finding Forever. Common explained to the audience that the title "Finding Forever" represented his quest to find an eternal place in hip-hop and also his wishes to be an artist for the rest of his life. The album debuted at No. 1 on the national Billboard 200 charts.

In an August 2007 interview with XXL, rapper Q-Tip of the group A Tribe Called Quest stated that he and Common were forming a group called 'The Standard', and were planning to record an album to be produced by Q-Tip; however, this never came to fruition.

Common was instrumental in bridging the trans-Atlantic gap by signing UK's Mr. Wong and J2K to Kanye West's Getting Out Our Dreams recording outfit. Common met the pair during his tour in the UK earlier on in the year. It is speculated that the deal is not only to bring the UK and US hip-hop genres together but that to rival Syco Music's cross-Atlantic success with Leona Lewis. He also has a deal with Zune mp3 players. In 2008 Common made an estimated 12 million dollars, making him equal in earnings to Eminem and Akon, tied for the 13th highest grossing Hip-Hop artist.

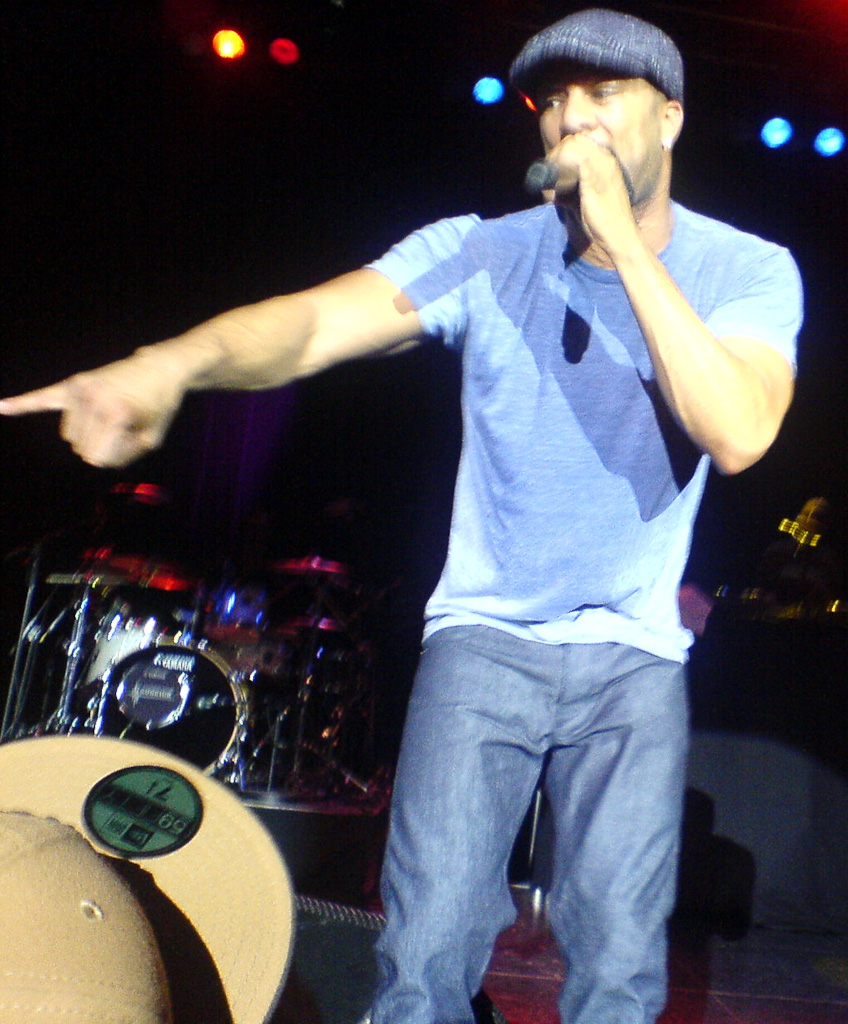
Common performing at Store Vega in Copenhagen, Denmark, in 2007

The eighth album from Chicago hip-hop artist Common was originally scheduled to be released on June 24, 2008, under the name Invincible Summer, but he announced at a Temple University concert that he would change it to Universal Mind Control. The release date was pushed back to September 30, 2008, due to Common filming Wanted. The release date was set for November 11, 2008, however, it was once again pushed back to December 9, 2008.

The album's eponymous lead single "Universal Mind Control", was officially released on July 1, 2008, via the US iTunes Store as part of The Announcement EP (sold as Universal Mind Control EP in the UK). The song features Pharrell, who also produced the track. The Announcement EP included an additional track titled "Announcement", also featuring Pharrell. The video for the lead single was filmed in September by director Hype Williams. In 2009, Common was prominently featured throughout his GOOD Music label-mate Kid Cudi's debut album Man on the Moon: The End of Day, as a narrator and featured artist. In late 2009, it was revealed Common was nominated for two Grammys at the 52nd Annual Grammy Awards, including Best Rap Performance by a Duo or Group for "Make Her Say", alongside Kid Cudi and Kanye West, as well as Best Rap Album for Universal Mind Control.

=== 2011–present: Think Common Ent. ===
==== The Dreamer/The Believer and feud with Drake ====
American producer No I.D., stated that he and Kanye West would be producing Common's album The Dreamer/The Believer. In July 2011, it was announced that No I.D. would be the album's sole producer. Common made an appearance on The Jonas Brothers' most recent album, Lines, Vines and Trying Times as a guest rapper for the group's 2009 song, "Don't Charge Me for the Crime."

On July 6, 2011, Common released his first single, titled "Ghetto Dreams", from his next album. A second single, "Blue Sky", was released on October 4, 2011. On December 20, 2011, Common released his ninth solo album, titled The Dreamer, The Believer. Although he left GOOD Music in 2011, Common was featured on the label's first compilation album, 2012's Cruel Summer. Common released a song entitled "Sweet", from The Dreamer/The Believer, which included lyrics critical of rappers who sing, although this criticism was not aimed specifically at Canadian recording artist Drake. Drake took offense and responded by releasing "Stay Schemin'", a song with Rick Ross and French Montana. Common fans only had to wait two-and-a-half days for him to respond to Drake's diss track. On February 13, 2012, Common commented on the feud by saying "It's over. But it was all in the art of hip hop. He said some things to me so I had to say some things back...I wouldn't say [he started it] but I know I heard something that I felt was directed to me so I addressed it. That's all. But you know, thank God we were able to move forward from it and all is good."

==== Artium Recordings and further albums ====
After a quiet 2012, Common announced he would release an extended play (EP) in January 2013, and his first mixtape in April. In February 2013, Common announced his tenth solo studio album would be released in September 2013 and will feature Kanye West and production from Kanye West and No I.D. Later on September 8, 2013, he gave an update to his projects saying the previously announced EP would be released soon, and would feature a song with new Def Jam signee Vince Staples. He also told HipHopDX, his tenth solo studio album would be released in early 2014.

On January 6, 2014, Common announced his tenth studio album to be titled Nobody's Smiling and would be produced entirely by longtime collaborator 'No I.D.'. The album, which Common revealed was originally going to be an EP, is set to feature Vince Staples, James Fauntleroy and "some new artists from Chicago." The concept of the album was inspired by his troubled hometown of Chicago: "We came up with this concept 'nobody's smiling.' It was really a thought that came about because of all the violence in Chicago," he says. "It happens in Chicago, but it's happening around the world in many ways." He continues, "We was talking about the conditions of what's happening, when I say 'nobody's smiling.' But it's really a call to action." On June 4, 2014, it was announced Common signed a recording contract with Def Jam Recordings and No I.D.'s Artium Records. It was also announced Nobody's Smiling would be released July 22, 2014. Lonnie "Pops" Lynn was to be featured on this album as well but the recording fell through as Lonnie's health declined. A recording was indeed made and is in process of being released on Dirty Laboratory Productions featuring production by AwareNess. In 2016 Common released his eleventh studio album titled Black America Again under Def Jam Recordings, the album featured guest appearances by Stevie Wonder, Bilal, Marsha Ambrosius, BJ The Chicago Kid, John Legend, PJ, Syd, Elena & Tasha Cobbs. The album was primarily produced by Karriem Riggins alongside many other contributors including Robert Glasper.

In 2018, Common also announced he would be forming a jazz group called August Greene with Karriem Riggins & Robert Glasper, shortly after this announcement an August Greene album was released through a partnership with Amazon Music. The album featured guest vocals (credited and uncredited) by male singer Samora Pinderhughes and featured award-winning singer Brandy Norwood on two songs titled "Optimistic" and "Time" respectively. On August 30, 2019, Common released his twelfth solo studio album titled Let Love, the album was released by Loma Vista Recordings and Concord Records. The album features guest appearances from Samora Pinderhughes, Daniel Caesar, Swizz Beatz, Leikeli47, BJ the Chicago Kid, A-Trak, Jill Scott, Leon Bridges and Jonathan McReynolds and production of the album was primarily handled by Karriem Riggins and the song titled "HER Love" (feat. Daniel Caesar) was produced by J. Dilla.

In 2020, Common released a nine-track album titled A Beautiful Revolution Pt. 1. The album features female singer PJ on seven tracks and also features guest vocals from Black Thought and Lenny Kravitz. In 2021, he released a sequel album, A Beautiful Revolution Pt. 2, which features guest vocals from Jessica Care Moore, PJ, Black Thought, Seun Kuti, Marcus King, Isaiah Sharkey, Brittany Howard, and Morgan Parker. Production of both albums was handled primarily by long-time collaborator Karriem Riggins, with various other producers credited as session musicians.

On August 1, 2023, Common was featured in Men's Health's Hip-Hop 50th Anniversary edition alongside Method Man, Wiz Khalifa, Ludacris, Busta Rhymes, and 50 Cent.

In 2024, it was announced that Common would be releasing a collaborative album with Pete Rock titled The Auditorium Vol. 1, and released the album's first single, "Wise Up". The album has since been nominated for rap album of the year at the Grammys and has accumulated millions of streams on Spotify.

=== Acting ===
In 2003, Common appeared on the American UPN sitcom Girlfriends. In the episode "Take This Poem and Call Me in the Morning", he appeared as Omar, a slam poet who competes with fellow poet Sivad (played by Saul Williams) for the affection of Lynn Searcy (played by Persia White). He also had a cameo appearance on an episode of UPN's One on One, where he played a drama class instructor named Darius. He also made an appearance on the ABC show Scrubs. In 2007, Common appeared with Ryan Reynolds, Jeremy Piven, and Alicia Keys in the crime film Smokin' Aces, making his big screen debut as villainous Mob enforcer Sir Ivy. He appeared alongside Denzel Washington, Russell Crowe, The RZA and T.I. in the 2007 crime thriller American Gangster. On January 20, 2007, one week before the opening of Smokin Aces, he appeared in a Saturday Night Live sketch as himself. The show's host was Piven, his Aces co-star.

In 2007, Common played the role of Smokin' Aces co-star Alicia Keys's boyfriend in the music video "Like You'll Never See Me Again".

In 2008, he had a supporting role in the film adaptation of the comic book Wanted alongside Morgan Freeman and Angelina Jolie. Common also appeared in the film Street Kings with Keanu Reeves, Hugh Laurie, The Game, and Forest Whitaker. Common also starred in the 2010 movie Just Wright as a basketball player who falls in love with his physical therapist Queen Latifah. He appeared in the 2009 film Terminator Salvation as John Connor's lieutenant Barnes.

In 2009, Common was cast as John Stewart/Green Lantern in the unproduced film Justice League: Mortal.

Common starred as a corrupt cop in the 2010 comedy Date Night with Steve Carell and Tina Fey. He was also featured in the role of deployed soldier Chino in 2011's New Year's Eve, the husband of Halle Berry's character, Nurse Aimee.

He was part of the ensemble cast of AMC's Hell on Wheels, as one of the lead characters, Elam Ferguson, a recently freed slave trying to find his place in the world.

In 2013, Common played the role of Agent Evans, an FBI agent in Now You See Me along with Mark Ruffalo, Jesse Eisenberg, Woody Harrelson, Isla Fisher, and Dave Franco. In the 2014 film Selma, for which he also co-wrote the Oscar-winning song "Glory", Common co-starred as 1960s civil rights movement leader James Bevel. In 2015, he played a hitman in Run All Night.

Common appeared as a gangster in the 2016 film Suicide Squad, directed by David Ayer and part of the DC Extended Universe.

In December 2015, Common appeared in the NBC TV special The Wiz Live!, as the Bouncer guarding the Emerald City.

In 2016, he co-starred in the film Barbershop: The Next Cut, alongside former rival Ice Cube.

In February 2017, he appeared alongside Keanu Reeves again, this time as professional hitman/bodyguard Cassian in John Wick: Chapter 2.

In August 2017, Common began voicing Kiburi the crocodile in Disney Junior's The Lion Guard.

Common played opposite Mary Elizabeth Winstead in Eva Vives's debut feature, All About Nina, which had its world premiere at the 2018 Tribeca Film Festival. It was a major, breakout role for which he has received much critical acclaim (Variety's Peter Debruge calling his performance "easily the strongest of the half-dozen supporting roles he's had this year"). That same year, he appeared as Rear Admiral John Fisk in the action thriller film Hunter Killer.

In 2018, Common starred in the film adaptation of The Hate U Give, playing Starr's uncle Carlos, a black police officer that is forced to defend his colleague that is involved in the shooting of a black teen.

In September 2022, it was announced that Common would make his Broadway debut in Second Stage Theater's Between Riverside and Crazy in the winter of 2022.

=== Film production ===
On October 27, 2015, Common signed a two-year deal with HBO that allowed him to start his own film production company, Freedom Road Productions. He stated in an interview in February 2012 that one of his big career goals was to start his own film production company.

In 2016 Common also worked with Amazon Studios and American Girl, serving as an executive producer for the direct-to-video feature An American Girl Story – Melody 1963: Love Has to Win.

=== Modeling and clothing ===
In 2006, Common was a model for photos of The Gap's fall season collection, appearing on posters in stores. Later that year, he performed in The Gap's "Holiday in Your Hood" themed Peace Love Gap. In February 2007, Common signed a deal with New Era to promote their new line of Layers fitted caps. Common also stars in a television commercial for the 2008 Lincoln Navigator. He appears in NBA 2K8 in NBA Blacktop mode. In the fall of 2008, Common appeared in an ad for Microsoft's Zune, comparing his new song, "Universal Mind Control", to "Planet Rock", a song from hip-hop pioneer Afrika Bambaataa. Also, he featured in the Diesel campaign for a new fragrance called "Only The Brave". His song "Be (intro)" is featured in a commercial for BlackBerry as of January 2011.

In December 2008, Common launched a new clothing line in partnership with Microsoft titled "Softwear", based on 1980s computing.

=== Writing ===
Common was invited by First Lady Michelle Obama to appear at a poetry reading on May 11, 2011, at the White House. His poetry was found to be greatly influenced by Maya Angelou's works. This invitation caused furor with the New Jersey State Police and their union, who cited some of Common's previous lyrical content, most notably the song "A Song For Assata" about Assata Shakur, a member of the Black Liberation Army (and step-aunt of deceased rapper Tupac Shakur) who was convicted in 1977 of the first-degree murder of New Jersey state trooper Werner Foerster. At another poetry reading, Common had stated, "flyers say 'free Mumia' on my freezer", a reference to Mumia Abu-Jamal, who murdered Philadelphia Police Officer Daniel Faulkner in 1981.

Jay Carney, the White House Press Secretary at the time, stated that President Obama opposed these particular lyrics, but supported what Common stood for more broadly. Common responded by saying: "I guess Sarah Palin and Fox News doesn't like me." On Facebook, he also stated, "The one thing that shouldn't be questioned is my support for the police officers and troops that protect us every day." Common later discussed the matter with Jon Stewart during a September 14, 2011, appearance on Comedy Central's The Daily Show.

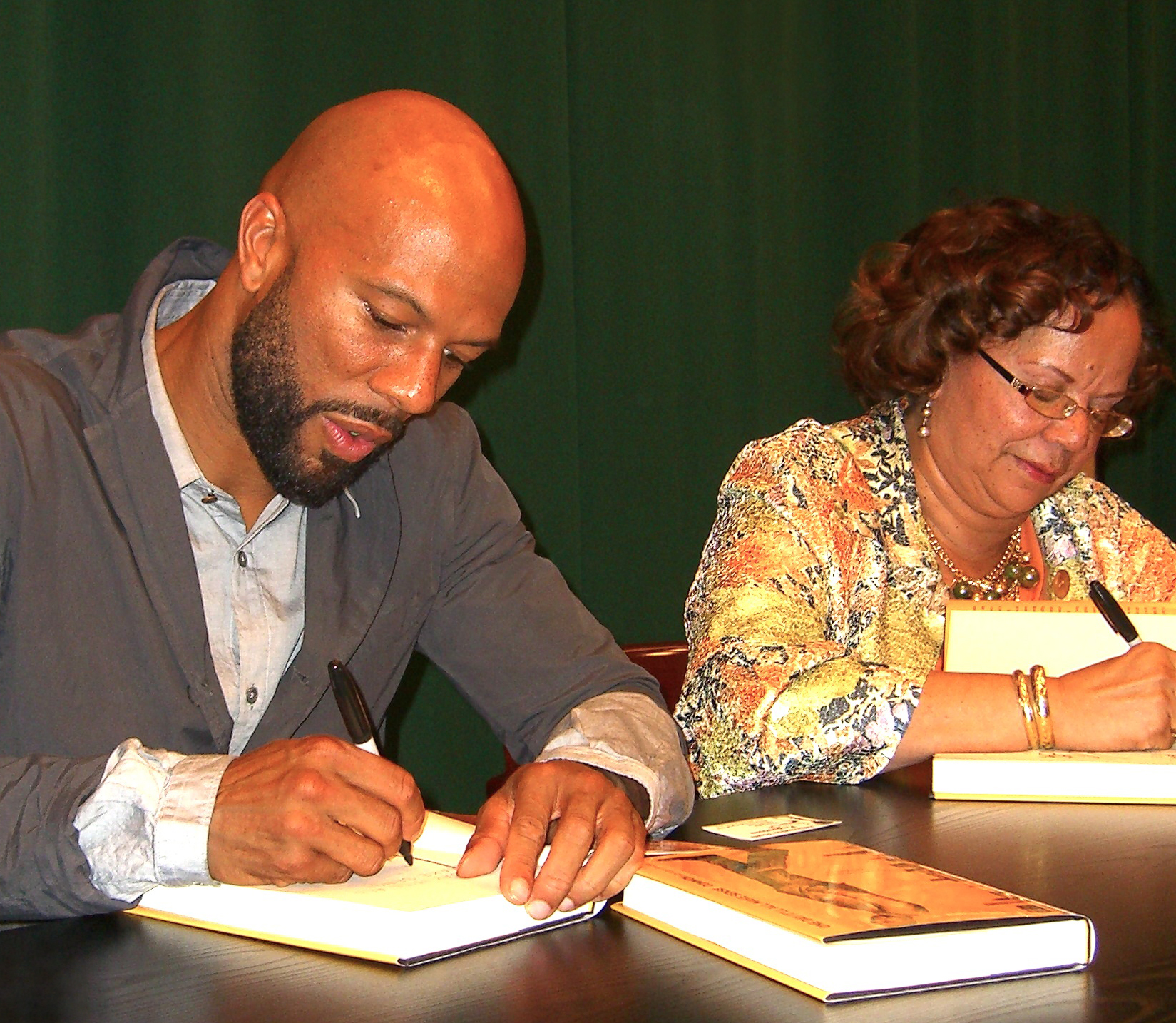
Common and his mother, Dr. Mahalia Ann Hines, at a 2011 signing for his memoir at the Barnes & Noble in Tribeca, Manhattan

In September 2011, Common published his memoir, One Day It'll All Make Sense, through Atria Books. As the book details how his close relationship with his mother influenced his life, it is partially narrated by her.

Common released his second memoir, Let Love Have The Last Word, in May 2019. The book highlights his relationship with his daughter Omoye, romantic relationships, his parents, and his struggle to cement his perspective in the concept of love.

== Activism ==
Common is a vegan and he is a supporter of animal rights and PETA. He appeared in a print advertisement for PETA titled "Think Before You Eat," and in a documentary titled Holistic Wellness for the Hip-Hop Generation where he promoted vegetarianism.

Common is also part of the "Knowing Is Beautiful" movement, which supports HIV/AIDS awareness. He is featured in the video for "Yes We Can," a song in support of the candidacy of Barack Obama, which made its debut on the internet on February 2, 2008. Common pledged to stop using anti-gay lyrics in his music.

Common is the founder of the Common Ground Foundation, a non-profit that seeks to empower underprivileged youth to be contributing citizens and strong leaders in the world. The foundation includes programs dedicated to leadership development & empowerment, educational development, creative expression, as well as a book club. In 2014, Common Ground inaugurated the AAHH! Fest music festival in Chicago's Union Park. After a one-year hiatus, AAHH! Fest returned in 2016, but was canceled one week before showtime in 2017. An official announcement stated the fest would return September 15, 2018.

In 2017, Common performed concerts in several California prisons, as well as on the grounds of the California State Capitol. This concert tour inspired him to found Imagine Justice, another non-profit organization.

In May 2020, in response to the COVID-19 pandemic, Common launched a social media campaign through Imagine Justice, dubbed #WeMatterToo, with dozens of advocacy and activist groups calling attention to the threat that the pandemic poses for incarcerated men and women and intended to create greater public awareness about conditions facing incarcerated populations. The campaign includes the production of short films that will include recordings of inmates expressing their concern about the coronavirus spreading inside prisons.

Along with other rappers and activists, Common appeared in the award-winning documentary short film #Bars4Justice, which was shot in Ferguson, Missouri and produced by Nation19 Magazine. Common performed with Andra Day in the opening musical performance for the March for Our Lives anti-gun violence rally in Washington, D.C., on March 24, 2018. He also performed at the 50th anniversary of Martin Luther King's death in Memphis, at an event co-hosted by the labor union UNITE HERE. Common was later accused of joining anti-union efforts by crossing a UNITE HERE picket line in Boston.

He supported the Kamala Harris 2024 presidential campaign and performed at the 2024 Democratic National Convention.

== Other activities and honours ==
On May 4, 2019, Common served as spring commencement speaker at the Florida Agricultural and Mechanical University (FAMU) and after his address, was awarded an honorary DFA degree.

== Personal life ==
Common has a daughter, Omoye, from his relationship with his ex-fiancée Kim Jones. Omoye graduated from Howard Law School in 2022.

Common was in a relationship with comedian and actress Tiffany Haddish from mid-2020 to November 2021. In 2022, while working on the film Breathe, Common met and subsequently began dating singer and actress Jennifer Hudson. The pair confirmed their relationship with a joint appearance on The Jennifer Hudson Show in January 2024.

He is a lifelong fan of the Chicago Bulls and Chicago Bears. He is a Christian, attending Trinity United Church of Christ in Chicago.

== Discography ==
Studio albums

- Can I Borrow a Dollar? (1992)
- Resurrection (1994)
- One Day It'll All Make Sense (1997)
- Like Water for Chocolate (2000)
- Electric Circus (2002)
- Be (2005)
- Finding Forever (2007)
- Universal Mind Control (2008)
- The Dreamer/The Believer (2011)
- Nobody's Smiling (2014)
- Black America Again (2016)
- Let Love (2019)
- A Beautiful Revolution Pt. 1 (2020)
- A Beautiful Revolution Pt. 2 (2021)

Collaborative albums

- August Greene (with Karriem Riggins & Robert Glasper as August Greene) (2018)
- The Auditorium Vol. 1 (with Pete Rock) (2024)

== Filmography ==
=== Film ===
Year	Title	Role	Notes
2002	Brown Sugar	Himself	
2006	Dave Chappelle's Block Party	Corant Jaman Shuka	
2006	Smokin' Aces	'Sir Ivy'	
2007	American Gangster	Turner Lucas	
2008	Street Kings	Imposter Coates	
2008	Wanted	'The Gunsmith'	
2009	Terminator Salvation	Barnes	
2010	Date Night	Detective Collins	
2010	Just Wright	Scott McKnight	
2011	Happy Feet Two	Seymour (voice)	
2011	New Year's Eve	Chino	
2012	LUV	Uncle Vincent	
2012	The Odd Life of Timothy Green	Coach Cal	
2013	Movie 43	Bob Mone	
2013	Pawn	Officer Jeff Porter	
2013	Now You See Me	Agent Evans	
2014	X/Y	Jason	
2014	Every Secret Thing	Devlin Hatch	
2014	Selma	James Bevel	
2015	Run All Night	Andrew Price	
2015	Entourage	Himself	Cameo
2015	Being Charlie	Travis	
2016	Barbershop: The Next Cut	Rashad	
2016	Suicide Squad	'Monster T'	
2017	John Wick: Chapter 2	Cassian	
2017	Megan Leavey	'Gunny' Martin	
2017	A Happening of Monumental Proportions	Daniel Crawford	
2017	Girls Trip	Himself	
2017	Love Beats Rhymes	Coltrane	
2018	The Tale	Martin	
2018	Hunter Killer	Rear Admiral John Fisk	
2018	Here and Now	Ben	
2018	All About Nina	Rafe Hines	
2018	Ocean's 8	Himself	
2018	The Hate U Give	Carlos Carter	
2018	Smallfoot	Stonekeeper (voice)	
2018	Saint Judy	Benjamin Adebayo	
2019	The Kitchen	FBI Agent Gary Silvers	
2019	The Informer	Edward Grens	
2020	Ava	Michael	
2022	Alice	Frank	
2023	Fool's Paradise	The Dagger	
2024	Breathe	Darius	

=== Television ===
Year	Title	Role	Notes
1997	Crook & Chase	Himself	Episode: "George Segal"
2000	The Lyricist Lounge Show	Himself	TV series
2001	Soul Train	Himself	Episode: "Common & Macy Gray/Transitions/Olivia"
2003	Girlfriends	Omar	Episode: "Take This Poem and Call Me in the Morning"
2003–05	Def Poetry Jam	Himself	Recurring cast
2004	Chappelle's Show	Himself/Musical Guest	Episode: "World Series Of Dice & Mooney On Movies"
2004	Game Over	Himself (voice)	Episode: "Into the Woods"
2004	One on One	Darius	Episode: "Cabin Fever"
2004	Scrubs	Himself	Episode: "Her Story"
2005	Black in the 80s	Himself	3 episodes
2005	MTV Unplugged	Himself	Episode: "Alicia Keys"
2005	Wild 'n Out	Himself	Episode: "Christina Milian/Common"
2005	VH1 News Presents	Himself	Episode: "Hip Hop Videos: Sexploitation on the Set"
2005	Driven	Himself	Episode: "Kanye West"
2005	$2 Bill	Himself	Episode: "Kanye West"
2007	Saturday Night Live	Himself	Episode: "Jeremy Piven/AFI"
2009–10	The Electric Company	Himself	Episode: "Lights, Camera, Beetles!" & "Jules Quest"
2010	American Idol	Himself	Episode: "Idol Gives Back/Top Seven Results"
2011	Single Ladies	Mayor Howard	Episode: "Pilot"
2011–14	Hell on Wheels	Elam Ferguson	Main cast (season 1–4)
2012	Bizarre Foods America	Himself	Episode: "Las Vegas"
2012	Sesame Street	Himself	Episode: "Practice Makes Proud"
2013	Real Husbands of Hollywood	Himself	Episode: "Thicke and Tired"
2013	The Mindy Project	Security Guard	Episode: "Harry & Mindy"
2015	Lip Sync Battle	Himself/Competitor	Episode: "Common vs. John Legend"
2015	Knock Knock Live	Himself	Episode: "Episode One"
2015	David's Vlog	Himself	Episode: "Smoking with Snoop Dogg!!?"
2015	In Their Own Words	Himself	Episode: "Muhammad Ali"
2015	The Wiz Live!	The Bouncer	TV special
2016	America Divided	Himself	Episode: "The System"
2017	American Masters	Himself	Episode: "Maya Angelou: And Still I Rise"
2017	Saturday Night Live	Himself	Episode: "Chance the Rapper/Eminem"
2017	The Simpsons	Himself (voice)	Episode: "The Great Phatsby: Part 2"
2017–19	The Lion Guard	Kiburi (voice)	Recurring cast (season 2), guest (season 3)
2018–19	The Chi	Rafiq	Recurring cast (season 1), guest (season 2)
2019	Sherman's Showcase	Henry	Episode: "Enemies"
2020	Fraggle Rock: Rock On!	Himself	Recurring cast
2020	Home Movie: The Princess Bride	Westley	Episode: "Chapter One: As You Wish"
2021	Never Have I Ever	Dr. Chris Jackson	Recurring cast (season 2)
2022	Storybots: Answer Time	Mr. Wonderful (voice)	Episode: "Glue"
2023–present	Silo	Robert Sims	Main cast

=== Video games ===
Year	Title	Role	Notes
2009	Wanted: Weapons of Fate	Brummel	Voice
2009	Terminator Salvation	Barnes	Voice

=== Documentary ===
Year	Title	Role	Notes
2003	The Blues: Godfathers and Sons	Himself	
2010	Bouncing Cats	Narrator	
2015	Unity	Narrator	
