= A Beautiful Revolution Pt. 2 =

Studio album by Common
- Released: September 10, 2021
- Genre: Conscious hip-hop
- Length: 38:23
- Label: Loma Vista
- Producer: Karriem Riggins

Common chronology
A Beautiful Revolution Pt. 1 (2020)	A Beautiful Revolution Pt. 2 (2021)	The Auditorium Vol. 1 (2024)

A Beautiful Revolution Pt. 2 is the fourteenth studio album by American rapper Common. It was released on September 10, 2021 through Loma Vista Recordings, making it his third project released for the label. It serves as a sequel to his 2020 album A Beautiful Revolution Pt. 1. Production was handled by Karriem Riggins.

== Critical reception ==
Professional ratings
Aggregate scores
Source	Rating
Metacritic	70/100
Review scores
Source	Rating
AllMusic	3/5 stars
Clash	8/10
DIY	4/5 stars
The Independent	3/5 stars
The Line of Best Fit	6/10
Mojo	3/5 stars
MusicOMH	4/5 stars
NME	4/5 stars
Rolling Stone	3/5 stars
Tom Hull	B+

A Beautiful Revolution Pt. 2 was met with generally favorable reviews from music critics. At Metacritic, which assigns a weighted mean rating out of 100 to reviews from mainstream critics, the album received an average score of 70, based on nine reviews, which indicates "generally positive reviews".

Robin Murray of Clash wrote that the album "stares down the traumas that proliferate our lives, offering hope, creativity, and soul filtered through Common's profound hip-hop vision". Joe Goggins of DIY found the album "a sweet paean to music's mood-boosting properties, as well as it capacity to effect meaningful change". Ben Devlin of musicOMH wrote: "Common raps with the calm contentment of a man who's reached his destination, and it certainly sounds satisfying". Will Lavin of NME wrote: "it's rich with Afro-centric grooves and dusty drum breaks, the spirit of James Brown weaving in and out of the pro-Black messaging, which emphasises hope and progress but still acknowledges the pain and suffering endured along the way".

In mixed reviews, Mojo writer resumed "an improvement on 2020's lightweight Pt. 1". Mosi Reeves of Rolling Stone wrote: "there's enough evidence on A Beautiful Revolution, Pt. 2 to suggest that he still cares about music, but it may take more than mellow bromides and Obama shout-outs to truly convince us". The Line of Best Fit reviewer wrote: "by catering to everyone in an effort to uplift, Common doesn't connect with the listener as much as he could–and as much as he has in the past. Common's big tent might be too spacious for its own good".

== Track listing ==
All tracks are produced by Karriem Riggins.

A Beautiful Revolution Pt. 2 track listing
No.	Title	Writer(s)	Length
1.	"Push Out the Noise" (Intro; featuring Jessica Care Moore)	Jessica Care Moore; Burniss Earl Travis II; Isaiah Sharkey; Annastezhaa Mitchell-Curtis	3:00
2.	"A Beautiful Chicago Kid" (with PJ)	Lonnie Rashid Lynn; Paris Alexandria Jones; Karriem Riggins; Travis II; Sharkey	2:38
3.	"When We Move" (featuring Black Thought and Seun Kuti)	Lynn; Tariq Luqmaan Trotter; Oluseun Anikulapo Kuti; Riggins; Travis II; Sharkey	4:11
4.	"Set It Free" (with PJ)	Lynn; Jones; Riggins; Travis II; Sharkey	3:34
5.	"Majesty (Where We Gonna Take It)" (with PJ)	Lynn; Jones; Riggins; James Jason Poyser; Travis II; Sharkey; Aliandro Prawl	4:34
6.	"Poetry" (featuring Marcus King and Isaiah Sharkey)	Lynn; Jones; Riggins; Travis II; Sharkey	3:16
7.	"Saving Grace" (featuring Brittany Howard)	Lynn; Brittany Amber Howard; Riggins; Travis II; Sharkey; Mitchell-Curtis	4:13
8.	"Star of the Gang" (with PJ)	Lynn; Jones; Riggins; Travis II; Sharkey	3:25
9.	"Imagine" (with PJ)	Lynn; Jones; Riggins; Travis II; Sharkey; Herman Chaney; Angela Lisa Winbush; Ivan Rene Moore	3:41
10.	"Get It Right"	Lynn; Jones; Riggins; Travis II; Sharkey	3:08
11.	"Exclamation Point" (Outro; featuring Morgan Parker)	Morgan Parker; Travis II; Sharkey; Mitchell-Curtis	2:42
Total length:			38:23

== Charts ==
Chart (2021)	Peak position
UK R&B and Hip-Hop Albums (OCC)	25
