= August Greene (album) =

Studio album by Common, Karriem Riggins and Robert Glasper (August Greene)
- Released: March 9, 2018
- Studios: Electric Lady Studios (New York City, New York); Henson Recording Studios (Los Angeles, California); Red Bull Studios (New York City); NRG Studios (North Hollywood, California); Brooklyn Recording (New York)
- Genres: Alternative hip-hop; jazz rap
- Length: 50:10
- Label: August Greene
- Producers: Robert Glasper; Karriem Riggins

Common chronology
Black America Again (2016)	August Greene (2018)	Let Love (2019)

Robert Glasper chronology
ArtScience (2016)	August Greene (2018)	Collagically Speaking (2018)

August Greene is a collaborative studio album by American rapper Common and record producers Robert Glasper and Karriem Riggins, recording as a supergroup of the same name, self-released on March 9, 2018. Recording sessions took place at Electric Lady Studios, Red Bull Studios and Brooklyn Recording in New York, and at Henson Recording Studios and NRG Studios in Los Angeles. It features contributions from Samora Pinderhughes, Brandy, Bilal, Estelle, Jeremiah Abiah and James Hall Worship & Praise Choir on vocals, Burniss Travis on bass, Patrick Warren on keyboards and strings, Elena Pinderhughes on flute and Roy Hargrove on trumpet.

== Critical reception ==
Professional ratings
Aggregate scores
Source	Rating
Metacritic	72/100
Review scores
Source	Rating
Albumism	4/5 stars
AllMusic	3.5/5 stars
Exclaim!	8/10
Pitchfork	6.5/10
Slant	3/5 stars
Tom Hull	B+
XXL	4/5 (XL)

August Greene was met with generally favorable reviews from music critics. At Metacritic, which assigns a normalized rating out of 100 to reviews from mainstream publications, the album received an average score of 72, based on five reviews.

Exclaim! reviewer praised tha album writing, "optimistic but never mawkish, August Greene distinguishes itself from other socially conscious albums with its practical approach. It's motivational music that, for once, makes change feel less elusive". Peter A. Berry of XXL described it as "a project filled with rich, jazzy vibes and all the tight lyricism we've come to expect from one of Chicago's very best". AllMusic's Andy Kellman wrote: "the set's predominantly reflective mood and nuanced composites of jazz, soul, and hip-hop make it sound like an extension of Glasper's Black Radio Recovered, Everything's Beautiful, and reinterpretation of Kendrick Lamar's "I'm Dying of Thirst" as much as the trio's meetings on Black America Again". Phillip Mlynar of Pitchfork wrote: "just as the album looks like it's about to settle and prosper in this zone, in comes "Piano Interlude", and the tone of August Greene shifts messily". In a mixed review, Josh Hurst of Slant stated, "the album is admirable and at times rewarding for its sense of experimentation, but only for those willing to meet it on its own terms".

== Track listing ==
August Greene track listing
No.	Title	Writer(s)	Length
1.	"Meditation"	Lonnie Lynn; Robert Glasper; Karriem Riggins; Samora Pinderhughes; Burniss Travis	3:00
2.	"Black Kennedy"	Lynn; Glasper; Riggins; Pinderhughes; Travis	4:12
3.	"Let Go"	Lynn; Glasper; Riggins; Pinderhughes; Travis	4:50
4.	"Practice"	Lynn; Glasper; Riggins; Pinderhughes	3:10
5.	"Fly Away"	Lynn; Glasper; Riggins; Pinderhughes	4:21
6.	"Aya"	Lynn; Glasper; Riggins; Pinderhughes	3:44
7.	"Piano Interlude"	Lynn; Glasper	0:46
8.	"No Apologies"	Lynn; Glasper; Riggins; Pinderhughes; Travis	4:51
9.	"The Time"	Lynn; Glasper; Riggins; Pinderhughes	3:38
10.	"Optimistic"	Gary Hines; James Harris III; Terry Lewis	4:56
11.	"Swisha Suite"	Lynn; Glasper; Riggins; Pinderhughes; Bilal Oliver; Brandy Norwood; Estelle Swaray	12:42
Total length:			50:10

== Personnel ==
- Lonnie "Common" Lynn – main artist, vocals
- Karriem Riggins – main artist, drums (tracks: 1–6, 8–11), guitar (track 9), producer
- Robert Glasper – main artist, piano (track 1), keyboards (tracks: 2–11), producer
- Samora Pinderhughes – vocals (tracks: 1–6, 8, 9, 11)
- Burniss Earl Travis II – vocals (tracks: 2, 11), bass (tracks: 1–6, 8–11), mellotron (track 1)
- Jeremiah Abiah – vocals (track 4)
- Bilal Oliver – vocals (tracks: 6, 11)
- Brandy Norwood – vocals (tracks: 9–11)
- Elena Pinderhughes – vocals (track 9), flute (tracks: 9, 11)
- Estelle Fanta Swaray – vocals (track 11)
- James Hall Worship & Praise Choir – backing vocals (track 10)
- Patrick Warren – keyboards and strings (track 5)
- Roy Hargrove – trumpet (track 11)
- Phil Joly – recording
- Michael "Law" Thomas – recording (tracks: 1–9, 11)
- Gosha Usov – recording (tracks: 1–6, 9–11)
- Kyle Hoffmann – recording (tracks: 2, 3, 9)
- Chris Tabron – recording (tracks: 3, 9)
- Beatriz Artola – recording (tracks: 9, 10)
- Billy Cumella – recording assistant
- Tate McDowell – recording assistant (tracks: 1–9, 11)
- Barry McCready – recording assistant (tracks: 1–3, 5)
- Evan Sutton – recording assistant (tracks: 3, 9)
- Jeff Citron – recording assistant (tracks: 8, 9)
- Manny Marroquin – mixing
- Chris Galland – engineering
- Robin Florent – engineering assistant
- Scott Desmarais – engineering assistant
- Emerson Mancini – mastering
- Gravillis Inc. – art direction, design
- Brian "B+" Cross – photography
