= A Beautiful Revolution Pt. 1 =

Studio album by Common
- Released: October 30, 2020
- Genres: Alternative hip-hop; jazz rap
- Length: 34:18
- Label: Loma Vista
- Producers: Burniss Travis; Karriem Riggins; Robert Glasper

Common chronology
Let Love (2019)	A Beautiful Revolution Pt. 1 (2020)	A Beautiful Revolution Pt. 2 (2021)

A Beautiful Revolution Pt. 1 is the thirteenth studio album by American rapper Common. It was released on October 30, 2020 through Loma Vista Recordings, making it his second project released for the label. Production was handled by Karriem Riggins, Burniss Travis and Robert Glasper. It features guest appearances from PJ, Black Thought, Chuck D, Jessica Care Moore, Lenny Kravitz, Morgan Parker and Stevie Wonder.

== Critical reception ==
Professional ratings
Review scores
Source	Rating
AllMusic	3.5/5 stars
Clash	8/10
Exclaim!	7/10
Tom Hull	B+

Robin Murray of Clash, in a 8/10 review, found "Steeped in his Soulquarian roots, ‘A Beautiful Revolution Pt 1’ taps into the man’s bedrock, while also presenting fresh avenues for exploration across seven songs that prove Common’s brand of soulful hip-hop remains thoroughly unique...In an era dominated by polarisation and opposition, ‘A Beautiful Revolution Pt 1’ seems to find its meaning in unity, and movement. Much more than a throwaway project, it contains some of Common’s most insightful, daring, and overtly beautiful music in a decade."

=== Accolades ===
Accolades for A Beautiful Revolution Pt. 1
Publication	Accolade	Rank	Ref.
Albumism	The 100 Best Albums of 2020	90	

== Track listing ==
A Beautiful Revolution Pt. 1 track listing
No.	Title	Writer(s)	Producer(s)	Length
1.	"A Beautiful Revolution" (Intro; featuring Jessica Care Moore)	Jessica Care Moore; Isaiah Sharkey; Burniss Earl Travis II; Aliandro Prawl	Karriem Riggins	2:14
2.	"Fallin'" (with PJ)	Lonnie Rashid Lynn; Paris Alexandria Jones; Karriem Riggins; Travis II; Sharkey	Karriem Riggins	3:57
3.	"Say Peace" (with PJ featuring Black Thought)	Lynn; Jones; Tariq Luqmaan Trotter; Riggins; Travis II; Sharkey; Prawl; Andre Smith; Lloyd Woodrowe James; Rexton Rawlston Fernando Gordon; Winston Delano Riley; William Anthony Maragh	Karriem Riggins	4:11
4.	"What Do You Say (Move It Baby)" (with PJ)	Lynn; Jones; Riggins; Travis II; Sharkey	Karriem Riggins	4:02
5.	"Courageous" (with PJ featuring Stevie Wonder)	Lynn; Jones; Robert Glasper; Riggins	Robert Glasper; Karriem Riggins	4:08
6.	"A Place In This World" (with PJ)	Lynn; Jones; Riggins; Travis II; Sharkey; Prawl	Karriem Riggins; Burniss Earl Travis II	3:35
7.	"A Riot In My Mind" (featuring Chuck D and Lenny Kravitz)	Lynn; Jones; Riggins; Sharkey	Karriem Riggins	5:13
8.	"Don't Forget Who You Are" (with PJ)	Lynn; Jones; Glasper; Riggins; Travis II	Robert Glasper; Karriem Riggins; Burniss Earl Travis II	2:53
9.	"A Beautiful Revolution" (Outro; featuring Morgan Parker)	Glasper; Morgan Parker; Travis II; Sharkey; Smith; Prawl	Karriem Riggins	4:01
Total length:				34:18

== Charts ==
Chart (2021)	Peak position
US Current Album Sales (Billboard)	94
