= August Greene =

American musical supergroup

- Origin: U.S.
- Genres: Hip-hop; R&B
- Years active: 2018–present
- Labels: August Greene, LLC
- Members: Common; Robert Glasper; Karriem Riggins

August Greene is an American supergroup. The brainchild of rapper Common, Robert Glasper and Karriem Riggins, it was formed in 2018 after sharing the Primetime Emmy Award for Outstanding Original Music and Lyrics for their song "Letter to the Free", which was part of Ava DuVernay's Netflix documentary 13th (2016).

The trio made their live debut on January 26, 2018 at New York's Highline Ballroom as part of Glasper's sixth annual Grammy Awards party, and released an eponymous joint album on March 9 through Amazon Music. The album was preceded by the single "Optimistic", a Sounds of Blackness cover featuring singer Brandy.

On February 21, 2018, August Greene performed an NPR Tiny Desk Concert.

== Discography ==
=== Albums ===
- August Greene (2018)

=== Singles ===
Year	Single	Album
2018	"Optimistic" (featuring Brandy)	August Greene
2018	"Black Kennedy"	August Greene

== See also ==
- List of musical supergroups
