= Angel Nafis =

American poet and spoken-word artist (born 1988)

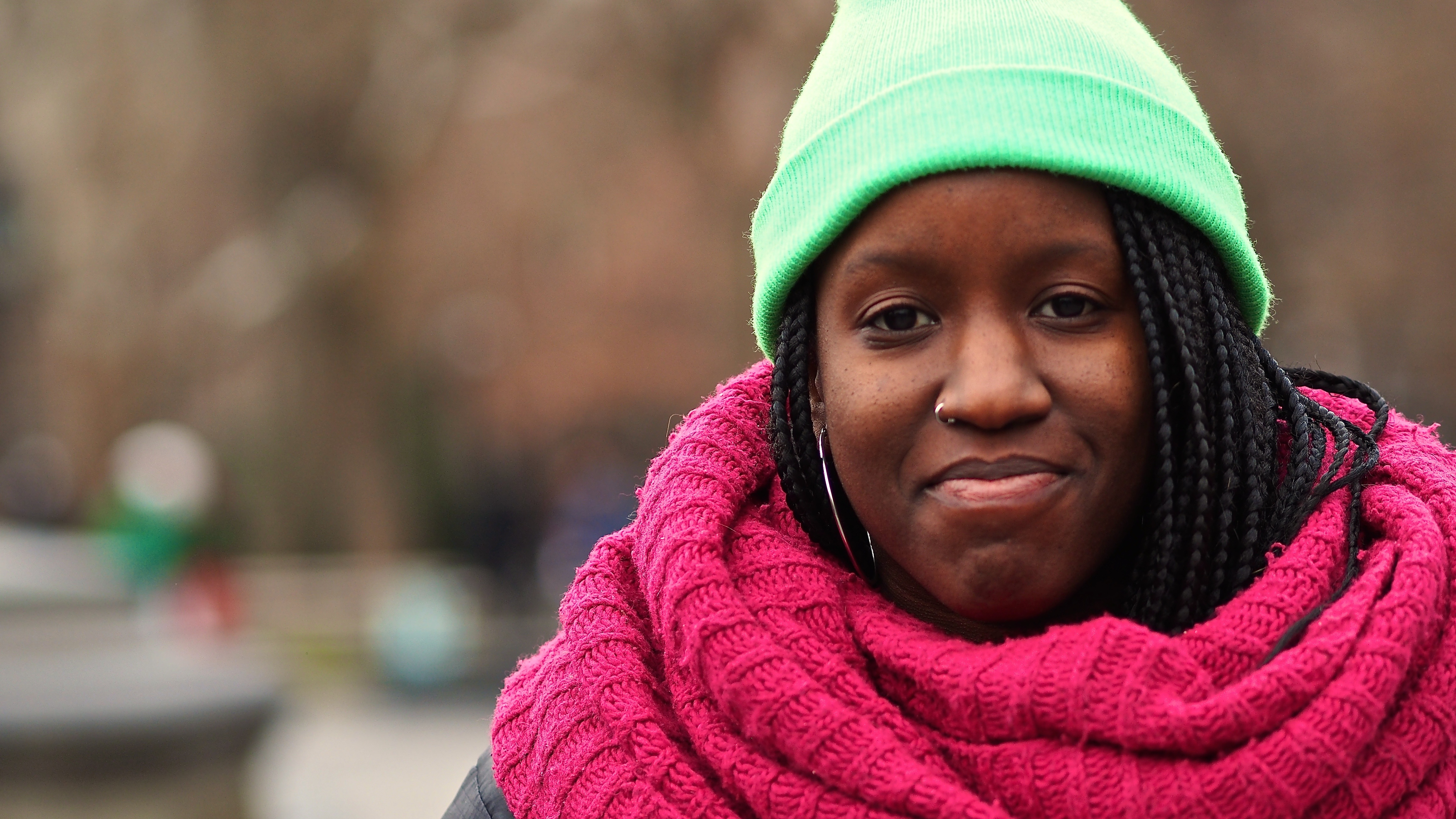
- Nafis in 2014
- Born: December 1988 (age 37); Ann Arbor, Michigan, U.S.
- Education: Hunter College (BA), Warren Wilson College (MFA candidate)
- Occupations: Poet and spoken-word artist
- Partner: Shira Erlichman
- Writing career
- Language: English
- Genre: Spoken-word poetry
- Notable work: BlackGirl Mansion
- Notable awards: Ruth Lilly and Dorothy Sargent Rosenberg Poetry Fellowship from the Poetry Foundation (2016); NEA Creative Writing fellowship

Angel Nafis (born December 1988) is an American poet and spoken-word artist. She is the author of BlackGirl Mansion (Red Beard Press / New School Poetics, 2012). She lives in Brooklyn, New York.

== Early life ==
Nafis grew up in Ann Arbor, Michigan, where she attended Huron High School. She struggled through school, but graduated in 2006. She was on the Ann Arbor Youth Poetry Slam Team in 2005 and 2006.

She was raised Muslim. Her mother died when she was young, so she was raised by her father. Her father's family was from New York and Georgia. Her mother's family was from Chicago and Mississippi.

== Education ==
Nafis earned her BA degree at Hunter College, and is an MFA candidate in poetry at Warren Wilson College.

== Career ==
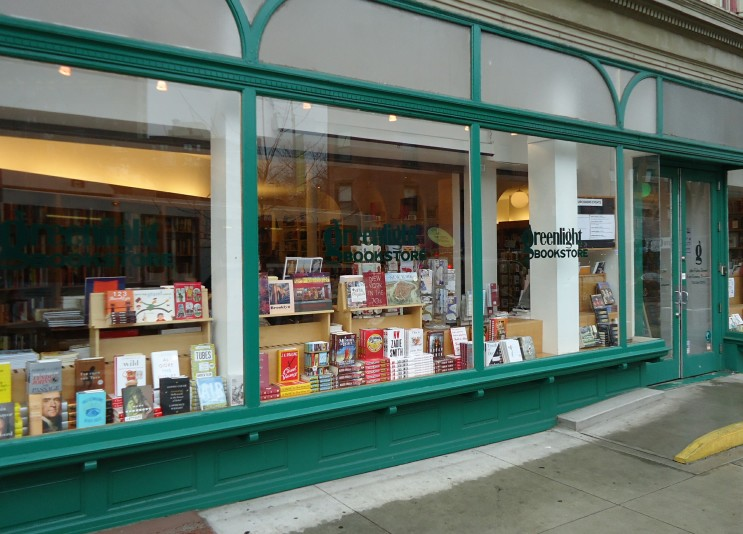
Greenlight Bookstore in Brooklyn

Nafis is a Cave Canem fellow, the recipient of a Millay Colony residency, and the founder and curator of the Greenlight Bookstore Poetry Salon's readings and writing workshops.

With poet Morgan Parker, she runs The Other Black Girl Collective, a Black feminist poetry duo that tours internationally.

Her work has appeared in outlets including the BreakBeat Poets Anthology, BuzzFeed Reader, The Rumpus, Poetry, Found Magazine's Requiem for a Paper Bag, Decibels, The Rattling Wall, Union Station Magazine, The Bear River Review, MUZZLE Magazine, Prelude Mag, Sixth Finch, and Mosaic Magazine.

== Personal life ==
Nafis lives in Brooklyn with artist, writer, and musician Shira Erlichman, with whom she is in a relationship. Together, they toured for the "Odes for You" tour.

In June 2020, Nafis and hundreds of other poets signed an open letter to the Poetry Foundation asking for the immediate resignation of both president Henry Bienen and board of trustees chair Willard Bunn III, as well as other demands relating to the foundation's response to the murder of George Floyd.

== Awards and honors ==
- Ruth Lilly and Dorothy Sargent Rosenberg Poetry Fellowship from the Poetry Foundation (2016)
- NEA Creative Writing fellowship
- Jerome Hill Artist Fellowship in the category “literature” (2023-25)

== Bibliography ==
=== Books ===
- BlackGirl Mansion (Red Beard Press/ New School Poetics, 2012).

=== Selected list of published poems ===
Title	Year	Publication/anthology	Reprinted/collected
"Love on Flatbush Avenue"	2018	Black Girl Magic (The BreakBeat Poets Vol. 2), Haymarket Books, 1st ed. 119.	
"Ghazal for Becoming Your Own Country"	2016	Poetry Foundation	Black Girl Magic (The BreakBeat Poets Vol. 2), Haymarket Books, 1st ed. 194.
"When I Realize I’m Wearing My Girlfriend’s Ex-Girlfriend’s Panties"		brooklynpoets.org	
"Woo Woo Roll Deep"	2017	BuzzFeed News	
"Angel Nafis"		Poetry Foundation	
"Omen to Get Your Ass Up"	2017	them.us	
"Ode to Shea Butter"		Prelude Mag	
"Ode to Lois"		Prelude Mag	
"Ode to Voicemail"	2015	Sixth Finch	
"Why R&B First Thing In The Morning, Why R&B Above All"	2015	The Rumpus	
"Angel's Heart Clowns the Ocean"		Muzzle Magazine	Performed at the Bowery Poetry Club in 2011
"King of Kreations"	2018	poetry.org	
"Angel's Heart Reasons with Her Dad"		Muzzle Magazine	
"I Know I’m Pretty Cuz The Boys Tell Me So"	2007	The Bear River Review	
"Directions to Finding You"	2009	Requiem For a Paper Bag Anthology	
"Tarbaby Fly"	2012	The Rattling Wall	
"Open"	2012	The Rattling Wall	
"Ghazal for My Sister"	2013	Mosaic Magazine	The BreakBeat Poets Anthology (Haymarket Books, 2015)
"Betty Boop"	2013	Mosaic Magazine	
"Legend"	2015	The BreakBeat Poets Anthology (Haymarket Books, 2015)	
"Gravity"	2015	The BreakBeat Poets Anthology (Haymarket Books, 2015)	
"Conspiracy"	2015	The BreakBeat Poets Anthology (Haymarket Books, 2015)	
