= The Auditorium Vol. 1 =

Studio album by Common and Pete Rock
- Released: July 12, 2024
- Genre: Hip-hop
- Length: 62:47
- Label: Loma Vista
- Producer: Pete Rock

Common chronology
A Beautiful Revolution Pt. 2 (2021)	The Auditorium Vol. 1 (2024)

Singles from The Auditorium Vol. 1
- 1. "Wise Up" Released: May 22, 2024

The Auditorium Vol. 1 is a collaborative studio album by American rapper Common and producer Pete Rock. It was released on July 12, 2024, through Loma Vista Recordings, making it Common's fourth album for the label. The album was entirely produced by Pete Rock, with co-production from Tuamie, as well as guest appearances from Bilal, Jennifer Hudson, PJ and Posdnuos.

The Auditorium Vol. 1 also earned a Grammy Award nomination in the category of Best Rap Album.

== Critical reception ==
Professional ratings
Aggregate scores
Source	Rating
Metacritic	78/100
Review scores
Source	Rating
AllMusic	4/5 stars
Clash	9/10
The Irish Times	3.5/5 stars
Mojo	4/5 stars
RapReviews	9/10
Rolling Stone	3.5/5 stars
Tom Hull	B+

The Auditorium Vol. 1 was met with acclaim from music critics. According to the review aggregator Metacritic, The Auditorium Vol. 1 received "generally favorable reviews" based on a weighted average score of 78 out of 100 from 6 critic scores.

Robin Murray of Clash praised the album, saying "finely sculpted and perfectly executed, The Auditorium Vol. 1 finds Common and Pete Rock utilising experience to their advantage. Creating a storm on its release, the perfectly executed roll-out trod the line between fan-service and expertly distilled creativity". Sy Shackleford of RapReviews also gave the album nine out of ten score, saying "wasting no time and not adding any filler, the psychedelic soul of "Dreamin'" kicks off the album with Common sounding as though he hasn't aged vocally", adding that "the album title has 'Vol. 1' as a suffix, indicating there's more to come. I hope so because The Auditorium, Vol. 1 is the kind of listen that makes one wonder what's next from the two". Stevie Chick of Mojo stated: "fielding love songs, existential ruminations and anthems of solidarity and resistance, The Auditorium Vol. 1 finds rap's self-proclaimed James Baldwin sermonising in the key of life on its every glory and struggle, offering hope amid the darkness and remaining a voice of mature wisdom in a rudderless world. It's one of his very best". Simon Vozick-Levinson of Rolling Stone concluded: "this is an easygoing, respectful tribute to hip-hop's essence and realness, full of affectionate references to the music that's still close to Common's heart after all these years. Flowing deliberately over a luxurious spread of prime Pete Rock beats, the griot from Chicago raps with wisdom and patience".

Reviewing the album for AllMusic, Andy Kellman called it an, "incontrovertible testament to the men's crucial roles in the culture across three decades," and claimed that both Common and Pete Rock, "achieve studio symbiosis with an uplifting collaboration that is nostalgic yet never sentimental, speaks to the present, and feeds the soul as much as it does the body and mind."

== Track listing ==
The Auditorium Vol. 1 track listing
No.	Title	Writer(s)	Length
1.	"Dreamin'"	Lonnie Lynn; Peter Phillips; Ernest Straughter; Ray Straughter; Luther Waters; Aretha Franklin	4:00
2.	"Chi-Town Do It"	Lynn; Phillips; Lauryn Hill	4:26
3.	"This Man"	Lynn; Phillips; Loleatta Holloway	4:02
4.	"We're On Our Way"	Lynn; Phillips; Roger Nichols; Paul Williams	4:16
5.	"Fortunate"	Lynn; Phillips; Ivan Lins; Vítor Martins	4:14
6.	"So Many People" (featuring Bilal)	Lynn; Phillips; Bob Merrill; Jule Styne	5:14
7.	"Wise Up"	Lynn; Phillips	3:47
8.	"A God (There Is)" (featuring Jennifer Hudson)	Lynn; Phillips; Paris A. Jones; Andrew Cooper	3:47
9.	"Stellar"	Lynn; Phillips; Giovanni Tommaso	4:23
10.	"Lonesome"	Lynn; Phillips; Mindy Dalton	4:36
11.	"All Kind of Ideas"	Lynn; Phillips; Joe Wheeler	3:48
12.	"When the Sun Shines Again" (featuring Posdnuos)	Lynn; Phillips; Kelvin Mercer; Tuamutef Ani; Joe Sample	4:45
13.	"Everything's So Grand" (featuring PJ)	Lynn; Phillips; Jones; Chico Buarque	6:04
14.	"Now and Then"	Lynn; Phillips; Jorge Geraldo Amiden; Martin Luther King Jr.	4:30
15.	"Outro"	Lynn; Phillips
Total length:			62:47

== Personnel ==
- Common – vocals (all tracks), additional vocals (track 12)
- Pete Rock – production, mixing (all tracks); DJing (tracks 7, 9), vocals (7, 11)
- Soulquarians – production (track 15)
- Tuamie – co-production (track 12)
- Dave Kutch – mastering
- Jamey Staub – mixing, engineering
- Phil Joly – engineering
- Beatriz Artola – engineering (track 8)
- Nelson Robinson – engineering (track 8)
- Abbey Lewis – engineering (track 12)
- Kevin Peterson – engineering assistance
- Bilal – additional vocals (tracks 5, 8, 12), vocals (6, 14)
- Jennifer Hudson – vocals (track 8)
- J Rocc – DJing (track 9)
- Marnie Hinds-Jones – vocals (track 12)
- Posdnuos – vocals (track 12)
- PJ – vocals (track 13)

== Charts ==
Chart performance for The Auditorium Vol. 1
Chart (2024)	Peak position
German Albums (Offizielle Top 100)	89
Scottish Albums (OCC)	94
Swiss Albums (Schweizer Hitparade)	36
