= Samora Pinderhughes =

- Born: September 4, 1991 (age 34); Berkeley, California, U.S.
- Genres: Jazz, classical, hip-hop, spoken word
- Occupations: Musician, composer, vocalist, activist
- Instruments: Piano, vocals
- Years active: 2010–present

Samora Pinderhughes (born September 4, 1991) is an American pianist, composer, vocalist, and activist known for his socially conscious music and interdisciplinary projects. His work fuses jazz, classical, and hip-hop influences while addressing systemic issues such as incarceration, racial injustice, and violence. He is the creator of The Healing Project, a multimedia initiative exploring the effects of mass incarceration, and has received widespread critical acclaim for his 2022 album Grief.

== Early life and education ==
Pinderhughes was born in Berkeley, California, and raised in the San Francisco Bay Area. He grew up in a musically inclined family and was introduced to jazz and classical music at an early age. His younger sister, Elena Pinderhughes, is a renowned flutist and vocalist who has collaborated with artists such as Herbie Hancock and Chief Xian aTunde Adjuah.

He studied jazz piano at the Juilliard School, where he was mentored by musicians including Kenny Barron and Taylor Eigsti. Later, he pursued graduate studies at Harvard University, focusing on the intersection of music and social justice.

== Career ==
=== Musical style and influences ===
Pinderhughes's music is deeply influenced by jazz, soul, hip-hop, and classical traditions. His work often incorporates spoken word and storytelling, blending activism with art. He has cited Nina Simone, John Coltrane, Kendrick Lamar, and Joni Mitchell as major influences.

=== Discography ===
Albums
Title	Year	Notes
Transformations Suite	2016	A fusion of jazz, poetry, and theater addressing social justice issues.
Grief	2022	Critically acclaimed album exploring themes of trauma and healing. Featured in The New York Times Best Jazz Albums of 2022.
The Healing Project (Soundtrack)	TBA	Associated with his larger multimedia work focusing on incarceration and social justice.

=== Notable projects ===
==== Grief (2022) ====
In 2022, Pinderhughes released Grief, an album that explores the emotional toll of systemic violence and trauma. The album was widely praised and featured in The New York Times’ Best Jazz Albums of 2022.

Bandcamp Daily also included Grief in its Best Albums of 2022: Essential Releases.

Pinderhughes performed selections from Grief for NPR’s Tiny Desk (Home) Concert series.

==== The Healing Project ====
Pinderhughes is the creator of The Healing Project, a multidisciplinary initiative combining music, film, visual art, and oral history to document the effects of incarceration and violence in marginalized communities. The project includes:

- A **15-track album** exploring themes of oppression, trauma, and healing.
- An **audio archive** featuring interviews with over 100 individuals affected by mass incarceration.
- A **museum exhibition** that debuted at Yerba Buena Center for the Arts (YBCA) in San Francisco.

In 2023, The Healing Project was awarded a **$1 million grant** from the Andrew W. Mellon Foundation.

=== Collaborations and film scoring ===
Pinderhughes has collaborated with artists such as:

- **Common** – Featured on the album Let Love (2019).
- **Robert Glasper** – Contributed to Glasper’s jazz fusion projects.
- **Karriem Riggins** – Worked with the acclaimed producer and drummer.

Additionally, he has scored films such as:

- Whose Streets? (2017) – A documentary about the Ferguson uprising.
- Burning Sands (2017) – A Netflix film exploring hazing in Black fraternities.

== Awards and recognition ==
Award	Year	Details
Andrew W. Mellon Foundation Grant	2023	$1 million grant for The Healing Project.
Adobe Creative Residency	2025	Selected as a resident artist at Museum of Modern Art (MoMA).
The New York Times' Best Jazz Albums	2022	Grief recognized among the best jazz albums of the year.
