= Let Love =

Studio album by Common
- Released: August 30, 2019
- Recorded: 2019
- Genre: Hip-hop
- Length: 46:38
- Labels: Loma Vista; Concord
- Producers: Karriem Riggins; J Dilla

Common chronology
Black America Again (2016)	Let Love (2019)	A Beautiful Revolution Pt. 1 (2020)

Singles from Let Love
- 1. "HER Love" Released: June 14, 2019

Let Love is the twelfth studio album by American rapper Common. The album was released on August 30, 2019, by Loma Vista Recordings and Concord Records. The album features guest appearances from Samora Pinderhughes, Daniel Caesar, Swizz Beatz, Leikeli47, BJ the Chicago Kid, A-Trak, Jill Scott, Leon Bridges and Jonathan McReynolds.

== Critical reception ==
Professional ratings
Aggregate scores
Source	Rating
Metacritic	70/100
Review scores
Source	Rating
AllMusic	3.5/5 stars
Entertainment Weekly	B−
Exclaim!	9/10
HipHopDX	2.8/5
The Independent	4/5 stars
MusicOMH	3/5 stars
Pitchfork	6.7/10
Q	3/5 stars

Roisin O'Connor of The Independent, in a 4/5 star review wrote, "Where Black America Again was notable for its sharp, observational urgency, Let Love feels far more personal, and softer in tone. Common’s optimistic nature gives it an uplifting vibe, and while closer “God is Love” is gently critical of people who use their religion to persecute others, the message is one of learning from our mistakes. It couldn’t be more timely." Erin Lowers of Exclaim!, in a 9/10 review, remarked "Part spoken word, part bars and part educational, Let Love lays on the heartstrings of soulful jazz samples, piano-driven melodies and electric funk bass lines. Sonically, the album is a time capsule of the greatest moments in black music history. Lyrically, it's hard-hitting reality about the present day, the good, the bad and the horrific — but it's also a captivating tale about using love as a weapon to overcome, as well as the reality that sometimes love also fails, whether it be romantic, platonic or social."

== Singles ==
The album's first single "HER Love" featuring Daniel Caesar was released on June 14, 2019.

== Track listing ==
No.	Title	Writer(s)	Producer(s)	Length
1.	"Good Morning Love" (featuring Samora Pinderhughes)	Lonnie Lynn; Pinderhughes; Burniss Travis; Karriem Riggins	Karriem Riggins	5:31
2.	"HER Love" (featuring Daniel Caesar)	Lynn; Pinderhughes; Travis; James Poyser; Andwele Gardner; Riggins	J Dilla	4:29
3.	"Dwele's Interlude"	Andwele Gardner; Pinderhughes; Travis	Riggins	1:09
4.	"Hercules" (featuring Swizz Beatz)	Lynn; Pinderhughes; Travis; Kasseem Dean; Riggins	Riggins	2:54
5.	"Fifth Story" (featuring Leikeli47)	Lynn; Pinderhughes; Travis; Riggins	Riggins	5:18
6.	"Forever Your Love" (featuring BJ the Chicago Kid)	Lynn; Pinderhughes; Travis; Riggins; Bryan James Sledge; Isaiah Sharkey	Riggins	3:39
7.	"Leaders (Crib Love)" (featuring A-Trak)	Lynn; Pinderhughes; Travis; Alain Macklovitch; Riggins	Riggins	3:41
8.	"Memories of Home" (featuring BJ the Chicago Kid and Samora Pinderhughes)	Lynn; Pinderhughes; Travis; Sledge; Riggins	Riggins	4:08
9.	"Show Me That You Love" (featuring Jill Scott and Samora Pinderhughes)	Lynn; Pinderhughes; Travis; Jill Scott; Riggins	Riggins	7:30
10.	"My Fancy Free Future Love"	Lynn; Pinderhughes; Travis; Nicholas Payton; Riggins; Ron Brown	Riggins	4:21
11.	"God Is Love" (featuring Leon Bridges and Jonathan McReynolds)	Lynn; Pinderhughes; Travis; Poyser; Riggins; Leon Bridges; Jonathan McReynolds	Riggins	3:57
Total length:				46:38

Target Edition bonus track
No.	Title	Writer(s)	Producer(s)	Length
12.	"Future Love (alternate version)"	Lynn; Pinderhughes; Travis; Payton; Riggins; Brown	Riggins	3:59
Total length:				50:37

== Charts ==
Chart (2019)	Peak position
UK R&B and Hip-Hop Albums (OCC)	6
Swiss Albums (Schweizer Hitparade)	86
US Billboard 200	118
