= Black America Again =

Studio album by Common
- Released: November 4, 2016
- Genre: Hip-hop
- Length: 56:43
- Labels: ARTium; Def Jam
- Producers: Common (exec.); No I.D. (exec.); Karriem Riggins (also co-exec.); Robert Glasper

Common chronology
Nobody's Smiling (2014)	Black America Again (2016)	Let Love (2019)

Singles from Black America Again
- 1. "Love Star" Released: September 2, 2016; 2. "Black America Again" Released: September 23, 2016

Black America Again is the eleventh studio album by American rapper Common. It was released on November 4, 2016, by ARTium Recordings and Def Jam Recordings.

Black America Again was supported by two singles: "Love Star" and "Black America Again". The album received widespread acclaim from critics, debuting at number 25 on the US Billboard 200.

== Background ==
Common felt the need to release the album close to election day in 2016.

== Singles ==
The album's first single, "Love Star", was released on September 2, 2016. The song features guest appearances from musicians Marsha Ambrosius and PJ, while the production was handled by Karriem Riggins.

The album's second single, "Black America Again", was released on September 23, 2016. The song features guest appearances from American R&B singer Stevie Wonder, with Karriem Riggins, who also produced the track as well, alongside Robert Glasper. On November 14, 2016, Common released the remix to "Black America Again", which features guest appearances from American rappers Gucci Mane and Pusha T, alongside the additional guest vocals from American recording artist BJ the Chicago Kid.

== Critical reception ==
Professional ratings
Aggregate scores
Source	Rating
AnyDecentMusic?	7.9/10
Metacritic	88/100
Review scores
Source	Rating
AllMusic	4.5/5 stars
Chicago Tribune	3.5/4 stars
Entertainment Weekly	A−
The Irish Times	4/5 stars
Mojo	4/5 stars
The Observer	4/5 stars
Pitchfork	7.9/10
Q	4/5 stars
USA Today	3.5/4 stars
XXL	4/5

Black America Again received widespread acclaim from critics. At Metacritic, which assigns a normalized rating out of 100 to reviews from mainstream publications, the album received an average score of 88, based on 13 reviews. Andy Kellman of AllMusic said, "All that's here, dark or bright, is vital." Greg Kot of Chicago Tribune said, "One of the year's most potent protest albums. ... The album sags midway through with a handful of lightweight love songs, but finishes with some of its most emotionally resounding tracks: the 'Glory'-like plea for redemption 'Rain' with Legend, the celebration of family that is 'Little Chicago Boy', and the staggering 'Letter to the Free'." Eric Renner Brown of Entertainment Weekly said, "It's the MC's empathetic and clear-eyed rhymes that truly make this a vital contribution to the national conversation." Erin Lowers of Exclaim! said, "Black America Again isn't an album meant for casual listening, but rather a socio-politically charged album meant to be absorbed so that everyone can truly recognize the 'Bigger Picture Called Freedom'." Andy Cowan of Mojo magazine stated, "'Pyramids'' borrowing of Chuck D's mantra 'I don't rhyme for the sake of riddlin'' is emblematic of his still-abrasive mood, whether dissecting the prison system's failures on 'A Bigger Picture Called Free' or unleashing his most heartfelt rallying cry on the thrilling Robert Glasper-produced, Stevie Wonder-starring title track."

Damien Morris of The Observer said, "Although there's no hit to rival the Selma soundtrack epic, 'Glory', and a reunion with its vocalist John Legend is the worst of furrowed-brow, gluten-free beat poetry, this is intelligent, impressive work." Edwin "STATS" Houghton of Pitchfork said, "Time and again he suggests that freedom itself is an act of improvisation, of imagination, that begins now: 'We write our own story.' It's in the context of these bigger ideas that Com lands some of his biggest gut-punches of all time, while rapping in his simpler, prize fighter mode." Steve Yates of Q magazine stated, "Uneven as it may be, Black America Again is a stirring reminder of the Chicago MC's relevance." Scott Glaysher of XXL said, "At the end of the day, Common creates a great album with such a pertinent and topical purpose. If nothing else, it's a strong snapshot of the happenings in America right now and the promise of what the country could become." William Sutton of PopMatters said, "Whilst certainly not flawless, Black America Again sees Common deliver some of his most vital work and reaffirms his place in the discussion of greatest conscious rappers of all time."

The Independent placed Black America Again at number 19 on their "Best Albums of 2016" year-end list.

== Commercial performance ==
Black America Again debuted at number 25 on the US Billboard 200, selling 15,000 copies in the United States.

== Track listing ==
No.	Title	Writer(s)	Producer(s)	Length
1.	"Joy and Peace" (featuring Bilal)	Lonnie Lynn; Emmanuel Riggins; Bilal Oliver; Derek Shulman; Ray Shulman; Kerry Minnear	Karriem Riggins	2:40
2.	"Home" (featuring Bilal)	Lynn; Riggins; Willie Mitchell; Louis Farrakhan	Riggins	3:31
3.	"Word from Moe Luv Interlude"	Robert Glasper	Robert Glasper	0:40
4.	"Black America Again" (featuring Stevie Wonder)	Lynn; Stevie Wonder; Riggins; Kenny Clarke; Rita Greene; Jake Riley; George Clinton; Carlton Ridenhour; Eric Sadler; Hank Shocklee; James Brown; Glasper	Riggins; Glasper	6:09
5.	"Love Star" (featuring Marsha Ambrosius and PJ)	Lynn; Marsha Ambrosius; Riggins; James Mtume; Willie Goodman; Harry Ray; Sylvia Robinson	Riggins	5:09
6.	"On a Whim Interlude"	Riggins	Riggins	0:41
7.	"Red Wine" (featuring Syd and Elena)	Lynn; Riggins; Sydney Bennet; Samora Pinderhughes; Edgar Cosma; Vladimir Cosma	Riggins	4:35
8.	"Pyramids"	Lynn; Riggins; Glasper; Derrick Harris; Russell Jones	Riggins; Glasper	3:30
9.	"A Moment in the Sun Interlude"	Glasper	Glasper	0:51
10.	"Unfamiliar" (featuring PJ)	Lynn; Riggins; Paris Jones; John Cameron	Riggins	3:58
11.	"A Bigger Picture Called Free" (featuring Syd and Bilal)	Lynn; Riggins; Bennet; Oliver; Adam Feeney	Riggins	4:38
12.	"The Day Women Took Over" (featuring BJ the Chicago Kid)	Lynn; Riggins; Maimouna Youssef; Bryan Sledge; Mark Blumberg	Riggins	5:16
13.	"Rain" (featuring John Legend)	Lynn; Riggins; Tanisha Riggins	Riggins	4:08
14.	"Little Chicago Boy" (featuring Tasha Cobbs)	Lynn; Tasha Cobbs; Riggins; Feeney	Riggins	6:37
15.	"Letter to the Free" (featuring Bilal)	Lynn; Riggins; Glasper	Riggins; Glasper	4:24
Total length:				56:43

Notes

- "Joy and Peace" features background vocals by Syd, Tasha Cobbs, Marsha Ambrosius, PJ and BJ the Chicago Kid
- "Word From Moe Luv Interlude" features vocals by David Grants
- "Black America Again" features background vocals by Chuck D and MC Lyte
- "Pyramids" features vocals by Bilal
- "A Moment in the Sun Interlude" features vocals by Lynetria Johnson and Elena
- "Little Chicago Boy" features background vocals by Marsha Ambrosius

Sample credits

- "Joy and Peace" contains elements from "Empty City", performed by Gentle Giant.
- "Home" contains elements from "I'm Going Home (To Live With God)", performed by O. V. Wright; it also contains elements from the album Our Time Has Come by Louis Farrakhan.
- "Black America Again" contains elements from "Catch a Groove", performed by Juice.
- "Love Star" contains elements from "You, Me, and He", performed by Mtume; It also contains a sample of "Sexy Mama", performed by The Moments.
- "Red Wine" contains elements from "Cormoran Bléssé", performed by Edgar Vercy.
- "Pyramids" contains elements from "Brooklyn Zoo", performed by Ol' Dirty Bastard.
- "Unfamiliar" contains elements from "Half Forgotten Daydreams", performed by John Cameron, licensed courtesy of KPM Music.
- "The Day Women Took Over" contains elements from "Quiet Run", performed by Mark Blumberg, courtesy of Mark Blumberg and published by TM Century Inc.
- "Little Chicago Boy" contains elements from "Stoner's Creek", performed by Frank Dukes.

== Charts ==
Chart (2016)	Peak position
UK R&B and Hip-Hop Albums (OCC)	12
New Zealand Heatseekers Albums (RMNZ)	9
US Billboard 200	25
US Top R&B/Hip-Hop Albums (Billboard)	3
