= Jessica Care Moore =

American poet (born 1971)

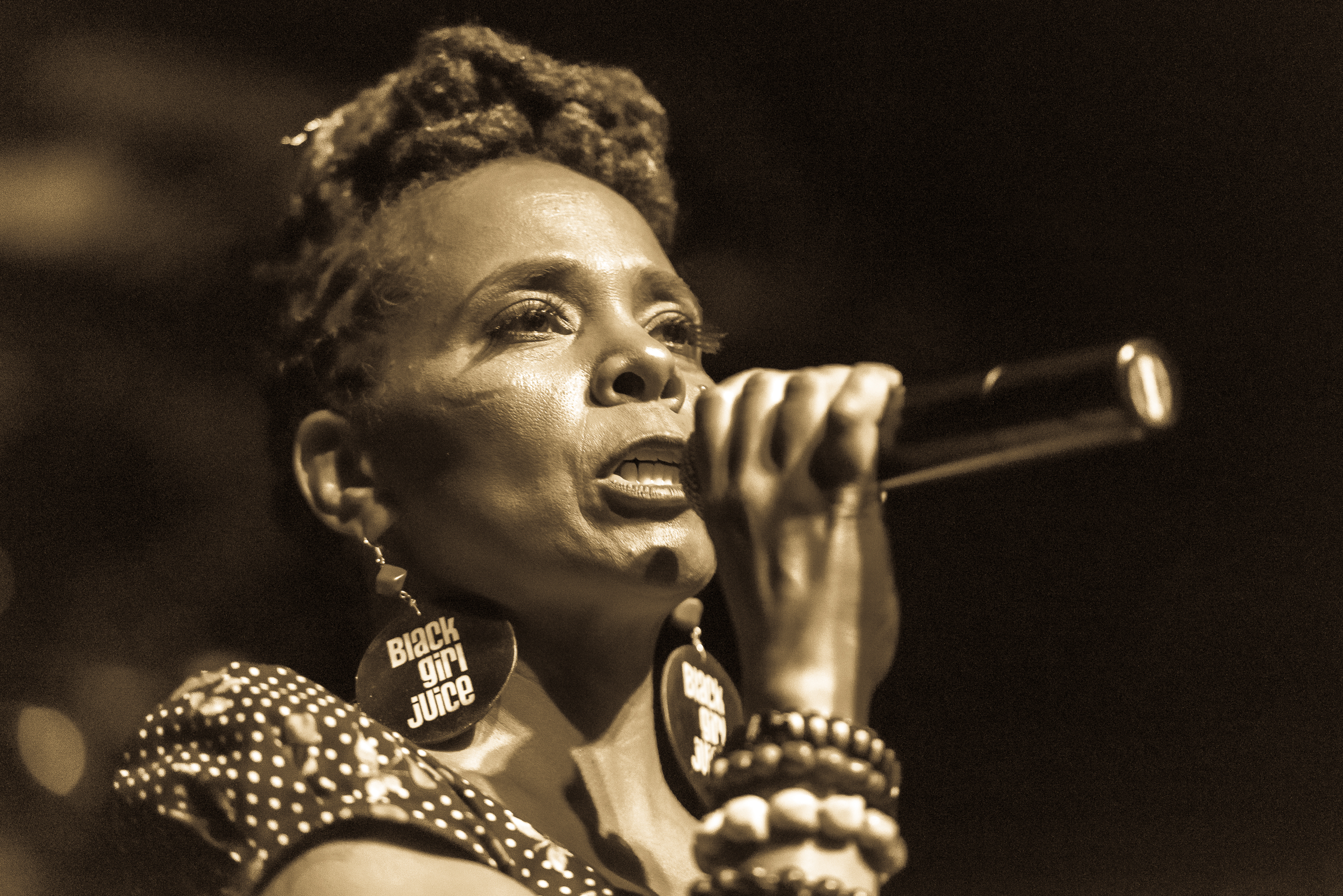
Jessica Care Moore in 2015

Jessica Care Moore (born October 28, 1971) is an American poet. She is the CEO of Moore Black Press, executive producer of BLACK WOMEN ROCK!, and founder of the literacy-driven jess Care moore Foundation. An internationally renowned poet, playwright, performance artist, and producer, she is the recipient of the 2013 Alain Locke Award from the Detroit Institute of Arts.

Moore is the author of The Words Don’t Fit in My Mouth, The Alphabet Verses The Ghetto, God is Not an American, Sunlight Through Bullet Holes and We Want Our Bodies Back. Her poetry has been heard on stages including Carnegie Hall, Lincoln Center, and the London Institute of Contemporary Arts.

In 2023, The Detroit News wrote an Artist Spotlight article focused on her life.

== Early career ==
Born on October 28, 1971, in Detroit, Michigan, Jessica Care Moore first came to national prominence when she won the "It’s Showtime at the Apollo" competition a record-breaking five times in a row. Her performance of the poem "Black Statue of Liberty" earned her several meetings with high-profile publishing companies. In 1997, she launched a publishing company of her own, Moore Black Press.

Her first book, The Words Don’t Fit In My Mouth, sold more than 20,000 copies. Along with her own work, she has also published poets such as Saul Williams, Shariff Simmons, Def Poetry Jam's co-founder Danny Simmons, NBA player Etan Thomas, Ras Baraka, and former Essence Magazine editor Asha Bandele.

== Writing ==
Moore's work has been published in several literary collections, including 44 on 44 (Third World Press, 2011); A Different Image (U of D Mercy Press, 2004); Abandon Automobile (WSU Press, 2001); Listen Up! (Random House, 1999); Step Into A World (Wiley Publishing, 2001); Role Call (Third World Press, 2002); and Bum Rush The Page: A Def Poetry Jam (Crown Publishing, 2001). She is the youngest poet published in the Prentice Hall Anthology of African American Women’s Literature by Valerie Lee, alongside literary greats such as Zora Neale Hurston, Alice Walker, Octavia Butler, and Maya Angelou.

Moore has appeared on the cover of The New York Times, The Metro Times, Michigan FrontPage, Detroit News, Detroit Free Press, African Voices Magazine, and Black Elegance Magazine. She has been featured in print and online magazines across the world, including Essence, Huffington Post, Blaze, The Source, Vibe, Bomb, Mosaic, Savoy, One World, Upscale, Ambassador Magazine and UPTOWN.

Her multimedia show God is Not an American was produced by The Apollo Theater and Time Warner's NYC Parks Summer Concert Series. She was the host, writer and co-executive producer of the poetry-driven television show Spoken, which was executive produced by and directed by Robert Townsend and aired on The Black Family Channel.

In February 2017, Moore staged the afrofuturistic, techno-inspired choreopoem Salt City, directed by Aku Kadogo. It was performed again in June 2019 at the Charles H. Wright Museum in Detroit, co-directed with Kadogo and Marlies Yearby.

Her work is featured at the Smithsonian National Museum of African American History and Culture.

== Hip hop contributions ==
Moore's poetry is featured on Nas’ Nastradamus album, Jeezy's Church in These Streets, and Talib Kweli’s Attack The Block mix tape. She is a returning star of Russell Simmons’ HBO series Def Poetry Jam. She is also featured on the Silent Poets track This Is Not An Instrumental.

== Music projects ==
Jessica Care Moore's techno solo theatre performance The Missing Project: Pieces of the D is a homage to Detroit. She produced her first conceptual art installation, NANOC: I Sing The Body Electric, in 2011, which opened at the Dell Pryor Gallery. Her work was on exhibit at the American Jazz Museum in Kansas City and the Charles H. Wright Museum through August 2014 for her Black WOMEN Rock! Exhibition.

Her debut album, Black Tea: The Legend of Jessi James, was released in fall of 2014 and produced via Javotti Media. The album features guest appearances from Talib Kweli, Roy Ayers and Jose James.

Jessica Care Moore was featured on a spoken-word album titled Eargasms.

In 2023, Moore was one of the headliners of "Queens of the Song Age" at the Detroit House of Music in Detroit.

== Activism ==
Moore used her voice as an artist for the international fight against AIDS. She performed for the United Nations World AIDS Day Commemoration two years in a row and was one of the organizers of Hip-Hop-A-Thon, a concert in San Francisco, which helped increase AIDS education in the Bay Area's Black and Latino communities. Moore has also performed during AIDS WALK Opening Ceremonies in New York City, San Francisco, Los Angeles, Florida, and Atlanta.

== Personal life ==
Jessica Care Moore lives, writes, and plays in downtown Detroit. Beyond her artistic endeavors, she is also the founder and CEO of Moore Black Press, as well as the founder of Black WOMEN Rock! and the Jess Care Moore Foundation, which focuses on promoting literacy. Her accolades include being a recipient of the Knight Arts Award in both 2019 and 2017, a 2016 Kresge Arts fellow, an awardee of the NAACP Great Expectations, and a recipient of the Alain Locke Award from the Detroit Institute of Arts
