= Morgan Parker (writer) =

American poet

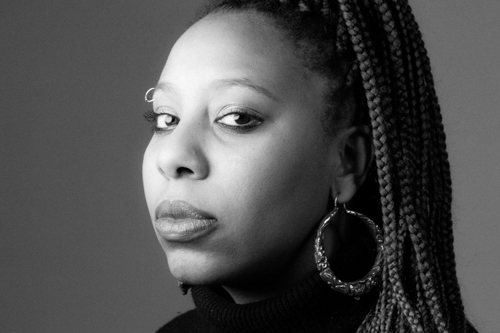
- Born: December 19, 1987 (age 38)
- Education: Columbia University (BA); New York University (MFA)
- Occupations: Poet, editor, novelist
- Writing career
- Notable work: There Are More Beautiful Things Than Beyoncé

Morgan Parker (born December 19, 1987) is an American poet, novelist, and editor. She is the author of poetry collections Other People’s Comfort Keeps Me Up At Night (Switchback Books, 2015), There are More Beautiful Things than Beyoncé (Tin House Books, 2017), and Magical Negro (Tin House Books, 2019), which won the National Book Critics Circle Award. She is also author of the young adult novel, Who Put This Song On (Delacorte Press, 2019). She has been described as a "multidisciplinary phenom" for her diverse body of work.

== Personal life and education ==
Parker completed her bachelor's degree in anthropology and creative writing at Columbia University and her MFA in poetry at New York University. Parker was born and raised in Southern California before attending school in New York. She moved back to Southern California in 2017.

== Career ==
Parker previously served as editor at Amazon Publishing's Little A and Day One. She has taught creative writing at Columbia University, co-curates the Poets With Attitude (PWA) reading series with Tommy Pico, is the creator and host of Reparations, Live! at the Ace Hotel in New York, and is a member of The Other Black Girl Collective with poet and performer Angel Nafis.

Her poetry has been featured in publications including The Awl, Poetry Foundation, Tin House, and others. Her work was also included in Why I Am Not A Painter (Argos Books), The BreakBeat Poets: New American Poetry in the Age of Hip-Hop, Black Girl Magic: The BreakBeat Poets Vol. 2 and Best American Poetry 2016.

In December 2015, she was Poetry Foundation's featured blogger.

=== Other People’s Comfort Keeps Me Up At Night, Switchback Books, 2015 ===
Other People's Comfort Keeps Me Up At Night was Parker's debut collection, published in 2015, was rereleased in both the UK and US in 2021. In an interview with the London Review Bookshop upon the book rerelease, Parker discusses and reflects on her art with Rachel Long. In this they also discuss the importance of spoken word and humor, where Parker's boldness gives the poems a life beyond the page, weaving between humor, pathos and collapses the distinction between the personal and political.

The rerelease opens with an introduction by Danez Smith:

Morgan Parker knows we are looking. You could say Morgan Parker considers audience; I say she peeps game. She knows on the other side of the poem is another person, their being, their ways, their looking. These pages become screens for Parker to set the conditions of that witnessing, to set a control for the wildness of lyric and living captured in this collection. (Are they Morgan. Kinda. Yes. Maybe. No. And.) find themselves dreaming up Real World audition tapes, giving Real Housewives confessions, launching urgent and prayer-filled questions at Miss Black America. They know we're watching. Morgan knows. She looks back.

=== Other Works ===
Parker's nonfiction essay collection You Get What You Pay For was published on March 12, 2024. It was featured as one of Time Magazine's best new books of March 2024. Parker said in an interview with Vogue that completing the book was taxing due to the vulnerable nature of the subject matter.

== Awards and honors ==
- 2012 Cave Canem Fellowship
- 2013 Gatewood Prize
- 2016 Pushcart Prize
- 2017 National Endowment of the Arts Literature Fellowship
- 2019 National Book Critics Circle Award (Poetry) for Magical Negro

== Bibliography and work ==
A partial list of Parker's publications

- Other People’s Comfort Keeps Me Up At Night, Switchback Books, 2015
- There Are More Beautiful Things Than Beyoncé, Tin House Books, 2017
- Magical Negro, Tin House Books, 2019
- Who Put This Song On?, Delacorte Press, 2019
- You Get What You Pay For, One World, 2024

=== Cover art ===
Cover art for the first edition of Other People's Comfort Keeps Me Up At Night features an adaptation of work by Sam Vernon. The first U.S. edition of There Are More Beautiful Things Than Beyoncé features commissioned artwork by Mickalene Thomas. The second edition features the photo Portrait of a Woman Fallen from Grace, 1987 by Carrie Mae Weems.

== Further works ==
Parker also writes essays and articles in between publishing her books and poetry.

Selected List of Published Poems
Title	Year	Publication/Anthology	Reprinted/Collected
Magical Negro #217: Diana Ross Finishing a Rib in Alabama, 1990s	2018	Black Girl Magic (The BreakBeat Poets Vol. 2) Haymarket Books, 1st ed. 18.	Magical Negro
Magical Negro #607: Gladys Knight on the 200th Episode of The Jeffersons	2018	Black Girl Magic (The BreakBeat Poets Vol. 2) Haymarket Books, 1st ed. 54.	Magical Negro
Magical Negro #80: Brooklyn	2018	Black Girl Magic (The BreakBeat Poets Vol. 2) Haymarket Books, 1st ed. 79.	Magical Negro
Let Me Handle My Business, Damn	2015	Poetry Magazine, April 2015	There Are More Beautiful Things Than Beyoncé; The BreakBeat Poets Vol. 1
Everything Will Be Taken Away after Adrian Piper		Paper Bag Online Literary Arts Journal Issue No. 8	Best American Poetry 2016; Magical Negro
The Gospel of Jesus' Wife		Paper Bag Online Literary Arts Journal Issue No. 8	There Are More Beautiful Things Than Beyoncé
Ode to Fried Chicken's Guest Appearance on Scandal (Alternate Title: Poem for Fried Chicken on Scandal)		Paper Bag Online Literary Arts Journal Issue No. 8	Magical Negro
