= FlySiifu's =

- Physical version cover

Studio album by Pink Siifu & Fly Anakin
- Released: November 13, 2020
- Genre: Hip-hop
- Length: 51:01 (physical); 46:37 (digital)
- Label: Lex Records
- Producers: Mejiwahn; Budgie; Lastnamedavid; Foisey; Playa Haze; Ahwlee; Jay Versace; Iiye; Ohbliv; Graymatter; Creme; Malik Abdul Rahmaan; Madlib; Animoss; Young Morpheus; Black Noi$e

Pink Siifu & Fly Anakin chronology
FlySiifu's (2020)	$mokebreak (2021)

Singles from FlySiifu's
- 1. "Dollar Dr. Dream" Released: 2020

FlySiifu's is a collaborative studio album by American rappers Pink Siifu and Fly Anakin. It was released on November 13, 2020, through Lex Records. It is "a loose concept album about two clerks at a fictional record store." It received generally favorable reviews from critics. The deluxe edition of the album was released on March 19, 2021.

== Background ==
FlySiifu's is "a loose concept album about two clerks at a fictional record store." It features guest appearances from $ilkmoney, B. Cool-Aid, Liv.e, and Fousheé. It is produced by Mejiwahn, Budgie, Lastnamedavid, Foisey, Playa Haze, Ahwlee, Jay Versace, Iiye, Ohbliv, Graymatter, Creme, Malik Abdul Rahmaan, Madlib, Animoss, Young Morpheus, and Black Noi$e.

== Release ==
FlySiifu's was released on November 13, 2020, through Lex Records. The deluxe edition of the album was released on March 19, 2021.

Music videos were released for "Richard Pryor", "Mind Right", "Razberry", "Waiting to Get Shot", and "Open Up Shop".

== Critical reception ==
Professional ratings
Aggregate scores
Source	Rating
Metacritic	70/100
Review scores
Source	Rating
Beats Per Minute	65%
Loud and Quiet	7/10
Mojo	3/5 stars
Pitchfork	6.8/10

According to the review aggregator Metacritic, FlySiifu's received "generally favorable reviews" based on a weighted average score of 70 out of 100 from 5 critic scores.

Tim Sentz of Beats Per Minute commented that "It's a fine record to put on in the background, but a slog to try to focus on, as so much of it blends together with hardly anything to standout in the end." James Butterworth of The Quietus called the album "a mixed affair, with moments of excellence interspersed with filler over a sprawling twenty-two tracks." Stephen Kearse of Pitchfork stated, "Though they don't bridge new worlds or sounds here, they confirm the implicit connections between their formative muses, threading the outré time signatures of J Dilla and Madlib, the spiritualism of Dungeon Family, and the flair of Dipset into a cozy tapestry." Phillip Mlynar of Bandcamp Daily wrote, "Over this relaxed and intoxicating backdrop, the two MCs' hazy voices are recorded and mixed so that they seep into the production." He added, "The approach gives FlySiifu's an intimate feel, making it feel like you're listening in on a series of late-night phone conversations between the two rappers."

=== Accolades ===
Year-end lists for FlySiifu's
Publication	List	Rank	Ref.
BrooklynVegan	50 Best Rap Albums of 2020	45	

== Track listing ==
All tracks are written by Livingston Matthews and Frank L. Walton, Jr..

FlySiifu's (physical edition) track listing
No.	Title	Producer(s)	Length
1.	"Kin'Tro"	Mejiwahn	4:34
2.	"Suitcase Special"	Budgie	2:01
3.	"Runthafade"	Lastnamedavid	2:53
4.	"Foisey's Interlude" (featuring $ilkmoney)	Foisey	1:29
5.	"Richard Pryor"	Playa Haze	3:04
6.	"Open Up Shop" (featuring B. Cool-Aid)	Ahwlee	2:30
7.	"Mind Right" (featuring Liv.e)	Jay Versace	3:40
8.	"Shloww"	Iiye	2:59
9.	"Rick James"	Ohbliv	2:51
10.	"Spades"	Graymatter	2:41
11.	"Clean" (featuring Liv.e)	Lastnamedavid	3:34
12.	"Creme's Interlude" (featuring Fousheé)	Creme	2:20
13.	"Waiting to Get Shot"	Malik Abdul Rahmaan	1:39
14.	"Time Up"	Madlib	3:32
15.	"Razberry"	Ohbliv	4:00
16.	"Dollar Dr. Dream" / "Morph's Interlude" / "Blame"	Animoss; Young Morpheus; Black Noi$e	7:13
Total length:			51:01

FlySiifu's (standard digital edition) track listing
No.	Title	Producer(s)	Length
1.	"Kin'Tro"	Mejiwahn	3:03
2.	"FlySiifu's Voicemail"		1:31
3.	"Suitcase Special"	Budgie	2:01
4.	"Runthafade"	Lastnamedavid	2:53
5.	"Foisey's Interlude" (featuring $ilkmoney)	Foisey	1:29
6.	"Richard Pryor"	Playa Haze	3:04
7.	"Open Up Shop" (featuring B. Cool-Aid)	Ahwlee	2:30
8.	"Mind Right" (featuring Liv.e)	Jay Versace	3:40
9.	"Shloww"	Iiye	2:12
10.	"One Hit Moo Skit"		0:46
11.	"Rick James"	Ohbliv	1:40
12.	"Black Bitches Matter Hoe"		1:10
13.	"Spades"	Graymatter	1:59
14.	"333Get@Me"	Iiye	0:41
15.	"Clean" (featuring Liv.e)	Lastnamedavid	3:34
16.	"Creme's Interlude" (featuring Fousheé)	Creme	2:20
17.	"Waiting to Get Shot"	Malik Abdul Rahmaan	1:39
18.	"Time Up"	Madlib	1:53
19.	"Demon Tyme Skit"		1:39
20.	"Razberry"	Ohbliv	3:08
21.	"Pick Up TF Phone"		0:52
22.	"Dollar Dr. Dream"	Animoss	2:44
Total length:			46:37

FlySiifu's (deluxe digital edition) track listing
No.	Title	Producer(s)	Length
23.	"$mokebreak"	Iiye	0:49
24.	"Oatmeal" (featuring Chuck Strangers)	Chuck Strangers	3:34
25.	"3 Dope Boys" (featuring 3WaySlim)	Budgie	3:53
26.	"Shawty" (featuring Big Kahuna OG)	Iiye	4:29
27.	"L's" (featuring Fousheé)	Ohbliv	2:00
28.	"Good Word" (featuring Yungmorpheus)	Graymatter	3:18
29.	"Tha Divide" (featuring Zelooperz, Mavi, and Koncept Jackson)	Ewonee	5:15
30.	"Remote Relocation" (featuring Peso Gordon and B. Cool-Aid)	Ahwlee	4:11
31.	"Blame"	Black Noi$e	3:02
32.	"Smoked Outro"	Iiye	0:41
Total length:			77:40

Notes

- The deluxe digital edition's additional tracks were released as the $mokebreak EP in 2021.

== Personnel ==
Credits adapted from liner notes.

- Pink Siifu – vocals
- Fly Anakin – vocals
- Swarvy – mixing
- Zeroh – mastering
- Jack McKain – photography, layout
- Jacob Rochester – logo design
- Barrington Darius – creative assistance
