= The Forever Dream =

Studio album by Fly Anakin
- Released: April 25, 2025
- Genre: Hip-hop
- Length: 51:10
- Label: Lex Records
- Producers: The Alchemist; Child Actor; Chris Keys; Foisey; Quelle Chris; Shungu

Fly Anakin chronology
Frank (2022)	The Forever Dream (2025)

Singles from The Forever Dream
- 1. "Yougotme!!" Released: November 13, 2024; 2. "My N*gga" Released: January 29, 2025; 3. "The Times" Released: March 12, 2025; 4. "Corner Pocket" Released: April 25, 2025

The Forever Dream, stylized (The) Forever Dream, is Fly Anakin's second studio album, released on April 25, 2025. Details of the album were first reported in January 2025. The album was recorded with executive producer Quelle Chris who also contributed production and vocals to the album. The album also features production from The Alchemist, Shungu and Foisey with guest vocals from $ilkmoney, BbyMutha, Pink Siifu, Denmark Vessey and Nickelus F. The album was released in April 2025.

== Background ==
There are twelve producers across the fourteen songs on the album. Talking to Style Weekly, Fly Anakin described the start of the recording process with collaborator Quelle Chris:

I went out of my way to make sure it wasn’t a single-producer project. When me and Quelle first talked about doing the album, he thought I had asked him to produce it. I said, “No, I want you to be the executive producer because I just did Skinemaxxx with Foisey.” I wanted to explore some shit, to take it to a different place. I knew that we could come up with something crazy if we just outsourced a little bit versus honing in on ourselves, because, of course, we can make a great project together. I just wanted some razzle dazzle. I started by sending Quelle songs. I sent him some shit I got with Graymatter, a whole folder of Madlib joints — some of this shit that be in the stash be amazing as fuck, like, it’s a whole Madlib album just sitting there. I can make a classic album out of my stash at any moment. I pulled "CheckOnMe" out after he said no to a bunch of shit, and it’s the only one he wanted.

A deluxe edition of the album, subtitled Night Shift, was released on June 12, 2026.

== Reception ==
Professional ratings
Review scores
Source	Rating
Pitchfork	7.7/10

On its release, the album was included in NPR's New Music Friday: The best albums out April 25, Brooklyn Vegan's 5 Best Rap Albums of April 2025 and was chosen as Bandcamp Daily's Album of the Day.

Pitchfork described the album's production as "tripped-out jazz and soul grooves that coexist with a dizzying assortment of lush psychedelic textures." Brooklyn Vegan found the album engaging stating "this one does feel especially upbeat and it really jumps out and grabs you." Gavyn Green wrote in Paste that "Fly Anakin’s rhymes are like fine grit sandpaper, working the rough edges of 90’s New York hip-hop until they shine with southern smoothness."

In December 2025 the album was listed as an album of the year in Glide's 10 Best Hip-Hop Albums of 2025 and Vice's Top 10 Hip-Hop & R&B Albums of 2025. Pitchfork ranked "My N*gga" as the third best track in their list of The 40 Best Rap Songs of 2025.

== Track listing ==
No.	Title	Producer(s)	Length
1.	"Good Clothes" (featuring Demae)	Chris Keys	2:35
2.	"Teen Summit"	Quelle Chris	2:49
3.	"My N*gga" (featuring Quelle Chris, $ilkMoney and Big Kahuna OG)	Shungu	4:55
4.	"Lil One (Intro)"	Micall Parknsun	1:30
5.	"Lil One"	Micall Parknsun	4:39
6.	"Checkonme" (featuring Lojii)	August Fanon	3:54
7.	"Nottooshabby" (featuring Quelle Chris, $ilkMoney and Nickelus F)	Child Actor	5:16
8.	"Lord Forgives, I Hold Grudges" (featuring Pink Siifu)	Denmark Vessey	3:31
9.	"The Times"	Mono En Stereo	4:06
10.	"Forever Dream (Interlude)"	Chris Keys	0:32
11.	"Forever Dream"	Chris Keys	3:18
12.	"Corner Pocket" (featuring BbyMutha and Quelle Chris)	The Alchemist	3:09
13.	"Dr Phil (Skit)"	Sycho Sid	1:14
14.	"Yougotme!!"	Quelle Chris	3:07
15.	"Forever Dream (Interlude)"	Fly Anakin	0:59
16.	"Say Thank You" (featuring Pink Siifu and Turich Benjy)	Foisey	5:29
Total length:			51:02

Night Shift (bonus tracks)
No.	Title	Producer(s)	Length
1.	"Clock In-tro"	Chris Keys; Quelle Chris	1:01
2.	"Happiness" (featuring $ilkMoney and Henny L.O.)	Quelle Chris	3:31
3.	"Sayless" (featuring NoGum Hundo)	DJ Harrison	2:21
4.	"I Need Those" (featuring $ilkMoney)	Child Actor	3:11
5.	"Big Fat Jelly Got a Word For Us"	Chris Keys	0:55
6.	"Sadatay" (featuring billy woods)	Graymatter; Quelle Chris	3:33
7.	"Bloodletting" (featuring Domo Genesis and Quelle Chris)	Graymatter; Quelle Chris	4:04
8.	"Cauldron Coochie Lucy-lude"	Chris Keys; Quelle Chris	1:06
9.	"A Twerk Song" (featuring BbyMutha)	Fly Anakin	3:50
10.	"Got a Gun"	Fly Anakin	2:38
11.	"SSX Tricky"	Quelle Chris	4:40
12.	"Socks Over the Smoke Detector" (featuring Quelle Chris, $ilkMoney and Fatima)	Shungu	6:09
13.	"Sandwich Bag Boys" (featuring Domo Genesis)	Graymatter	3:01
14.	"Clock Out-tro"	Chris Keys; Quelle Chris	0:52
Total length:			40:52

== Accolades ==
Publication	Accolade	Release	Year	Rank
Glide	Best Hip-Hop Albums of 2025	The Forever Dream	2025	—
Pitchfork	Best Rap Songs of 2025	"My N*gga"	2025	3
Vice	Top 10 Hip-Hop & R&B Albums of 2025	The Forever Dream	2025	9
