= Gumbo'! =

Studio album by Pink Siifu
- Released: August 3, 2021
- Genre: Neo soul; hip hop
- Length: 57:38
- Label: Self-released
- Producer: DJ Harrison; ConQuest Tony Phillips; Ted Kamal; Osagie; lastnamedavid; Michael White; iiye; Devin Burgess; Morgan Burrs; WAARVY; Butch Dawson; Ahwlee; The Alchemist; Butcher Brown; Foisey; Lee Tensei; Apollo Rome; Monte Booker; Notwolfy

Pink Siifu chronology
N*gro (2020)	Gumbo'! (2021)

Gumbo'! is a studio album by American artist Pink Siifu. It was released on August 3, 2021. The album's first single, "Lng Hair Dnt Care", was produced by Ted Kamal. On March 11, 2022, a deluxe edition, titled Gumbo'! (DELUXE'!!) was released.

== Critical reception ==
Professional ratings
Aggregate scores
Source	Rating
Metacritic	83/100
Review scores
Source	Rating
Beats Per Minute	85%
Exclaim!	7/10
HipHopDX	4.4/5
Pitchfork	7.4/10

Gumbo'! received generally favorable reviews. At Metacritic, which assigns a normalized rating out of 100 to reviews from mainstream critics, the album received an average score of 83, based on 5 professional critic reviews, which indicates "universal acclaim". Jonathan St. Michael from Exclaim! rated this album 7/10, saying it's "tapping into elements of trap and exploring layers of Southern-styled neo-soul".

== Track listing ==
Track listing and credits adapted from Spotify.

Gumbo'! track listing
No.	Title	Music	Producer(s)	Length
1.	"Gumbo'! 4 tha Folks, Hold On"	Pink Siifu; Big Rube; DJ Harrison; Liv.e; Nick Hakim; V.C.R	DJ Harrison	3:36
2.	"Wayans Bros."	Pink Siifu; ConQuest Tony Phillips; Peso Gordon	ConQuest Tony Phillips	1:13
3.	"Roscoe'!"	Pink Siifu	Ted Kamal	3:01
4.	"Fk U Mean / Hold Me Dwn"	Pink Siifu; lastnamedavid	Osagie; lastnamedavid	3:26
5.	"Bussin' (Cold)"	Pink Siifu; Turich Benjy	Michael White	3:44
6.	"Pink & Green, White & Gold"	Pink Siifu; Devin Burgess; iiye	iiye; Devin Burgess; Morgan Burrs	0:43
7.	"Back'!"	Pink Siifu	WAARVY; iiye	03:31
8.	"Doin Tew Much. (in My Mama Name)"	Pink Siifu; Butch Dawson	Butch Dawson	3:14
9.	"4sho'7"	Pink Siifu; Ahwlee; B. Cool-Aid	Ahwlee	0:59
10.	"Living Proof (Family)"	Pink Siifu; The Alchemist	The Alchemist	3:01
11.	"Scurrrrd"	Pink Siifu; Asal Hazel; Big Rube; DJ Harrison; Georgia Anne Muldrow; iiye; Nick Hakim	DJ Harrison; iiye	6:41
12.	"Smile (wit Yo Gold)"	Pink Siifu; Butcher Brown; Coco O.; V.C.R	Butcher Brown	3:20
13.	"Call tha Bro (Tapped In)"	Pink Siifu; Maxo	Foisey; Butcher Brown	3:24
14.	"Bravo'!"	Pink Siifu; JayBee Lamahj; Peso Gordon; Swaggy Q; Turich Benjy; VonBeezy	Lee Tensei; Apollo Rome	4:16
15.	"Voicemails Uptown"	Pink Siifu; JayBee Lamahj; Lance Skiiiwalker; Monte Booker; Nelson Bandela; Turich Benjy; V.C.R	Monte Booker	4:45
16.	"Big Ole"	Pink Siifu; BbyMutha	ConQuest Tony Phillips	2:30
17.	"Lng Hair Dnt Care"	Pink Siifu; Ted Kamal	Ted Kamal	4:28
18.	"Play On'! Inshallah"	Pink Siifu; Kamilah; Liv.e; Notwolfy	Notwolfy	1:35
Total length:				57:38

Track listing for deluxe edition
No.	Title	Music	Producer(s)	Length
19.	"Gumbo'! 4 tha Folks, Hold On - Remix'!!"	Pink Siifu; Big Rube; DJ Harrison; Liv.e; Nick Hakim; V.C.R	DJ Harrison	1:35
20.	"Juice Or Rep"	Pink Siifu; Lord Byron	Ben Hixon	3:08
21.	"All Dat"	Pink Siifu	Michael White	3:33
22.	"OldSchool'!/BEEP'!"	Pink Siifu	lastnamedavid; Ted Kamal	3:05
23.	"BIG DawG'!"	Pink Siifu; Kenny Beats	Kenny Beats	2:24
24.	"ThaWalk/FnkN'!"	Pink Siifu; Kamilah	Swarvy; iiye	3:27
25.	"Griptape'!!"	Pink Siifu; Valee	Devin Burgess	4:12
26.	"Fkn Yo Friends'!"	Pink Siifu; ZelooperZ	Nephew Hesh	2:34
27.	"SLOW'!!"	Pink Siifu; Turich Benjy	IMdead	3:18
28.	"SlowItDown"	Pink Siifu; Anwalk; Tyah; Remy Banks; Big Rube	iiye; Noel Spiva	6:35
Total length:				1:32:24
