= Black'!Antique =

2025 album by Pink Siifu

Studio album by Pink Siifu
- Released: January 27, 2025
- Genre: Experimental hip-hop
- Length: 77:42
- Labels: Dynamite Hill; Roc Nation Distribution

Pink Siifu chronology
It's Too Quiet…'!! (2023)	Black'!Antique (2025)	Onyx'! (2025)

Singles from Black'!Antique
- 1. "Screw4Life RipJalen" Released: October 28, 2024; 2. "WhoUWithHo+" Released: December 13, 2024

Black'!Antique (Note: Stylized in all caps as BLACK'!ANTIQUE.) is the fourth studio album by the American rapper Pink Siifu. It was released on January 27, 2025, through Dynamite Hill and Roc Nation Distribution. The album is Siifu's first solo album since Gumbo'! (2021) and followed several collaborative projects, including Leather Blvd. with Ahwlee and It's Too Quiet..'!! with Turich Benjy.

The album features guest appearances by Elheist, Apollo Rome, Liv.e, BbyMutha, Ho99o9, Kal Banx, Turich Benjy, 454, Vayda, HiTech, Monte Booker, Big Rube, and others. Critics described Black'!Antique as an album that moves from abrasive noise- and punk-influenced rap toward soul, R&B, ambient, and jazz-rap. Beats Per Minute ranked the album at number 38 on its list of the top 50 albums of 2025.

== Background and release ==
Pink Siifu had announced Black'!Antique, with a planned release date of January 27, 2025, through Dynamite Hill on December 13, 2024. The announcement was accompanied by the single "WhoUWithHo+", which features Kal Banx; Pitchfork wrote that the song followed the earlier Black'!Antique single "Screw4Life RipJalen".

The album was released on January 27, 2025, Siifu's 33rd birthday. In an interview with Jordan Darville of The Fader, Siifu said he wanted the album to feel like a "victory lap" and described albums as his preferred way to create a full listening experience. Pitchfork, Stereogum and The Fader noted the album as Siifu's first solo album since Gumbo'! after multiple collaborative releases.

== Music ==
Writing for Pitchfork, Matthew Ritchie described Black'!Antique as a community-built album with recurring Siifu collaborators including Benjy, Liv.e, V.C.R, Roper Williams, and HiTech. Ritchie wrote that the album moves between abrasive and soothing passages, and that its early tracks use noise rap and ambient textures before later songs incorporate chopped 1990s R&B samples and calmer ambient tones.

In Flood Magazine, A.D. Amorosi wrote that the title track and "Alive & Direct" draw from the sharper musical qualities of Siifu's 2020 album Negro, while later tracks move into psychedelic, samba-influenced, soul, and G-funk-adjacent passages. Anthony Fantano of The Needle Drop said the first nine songs are predominantly aggressive, abrasive, and experimental, before the album's second half shifts toward quieter abstract hip-hop and ambient rap sound collage. In The Fader, Siifu said the album drew inspiration from Sun Ra, Grace Jones, Missy Elliott, older Kendrick Lamar recordings, Kanye West, and HiTech.

== Critical reception ==
Professional ratings
Review scores
Source	Rating
Clash	8/10
The Needle Drop	6/10
Pitchfork	7.1/10

Ritchie wrote in Pitchfork that some of the album's ideas were uneven, particularly in its early section, but that Siifu's larger vision was clear. He identified "Girls Fall Out Tha Sky", "PSA", "U Already", and "1:1 [Fkdup.bezel]" as standouts, while saying that not every experiment on the album succeeded.

Amorosi characterized the album in Flood Magazine as both melodic and strange, emphasizing its collaborative cast and shifts across hip-hop, R&B, free jazz, and industrial hardcore reference points. Shahzaib Hussain of Clash described the album as long and meandering but inventive, writing that its experiments became more tangible with repeated listening. Dylan Green of Hearing Things reviewed Black'!Antique alongside 454's Casts of a Dreamer, writing that both albums used long runtimes to make room for messy and experimental ideas. Beats Per Minute ranked the album at number 38 on its list of the top 50 albums of 2025; Steve Forstneger wrote in the entry that the album's track sequencing and volume of features were weaknesses, but that its number of ideas outweighed those problems.

== Track listing ==
Track listing, featured artists, and lengths adapted from Bandcamp.

Black'!Antique track listing
No.	Title	Featured artist(s)	Length
1.	"Black'!Antique"	Elheist and Apollo Rome	3:28
2.	"Alive & Direct"	Elheist and Ss.Sylver	6:24
3.	"1:1 [Fkdup.bezel]"	Conquest Tony Phillips, BbyMutha, and Elheist	6:21
4.	"V12 HML"	Conquest Tony Phillips and Liv.e	2:44
5.	"Sacrifice Bon Appétit"	Mother MaryGold, B L A C K I E, and Ho99o9	3:23
6.	"Screw4Life RipJalen"		6:08
7.	"4Doe [47]"		2:22
8.	"WhoUWithHo+"	Kal Banx	3:13
9.	"Translation"	Turich Benjy, Tyah, and CRYSTALLMESS	4:34
10.	"Girls Fall Out Tha Sky"	Turich Benjy, 454, and Jaas	6:11
11.	"PSA"	Vayda	5:16
12.	"Facecard"	HiTech, Peso Gordon, GDMRW, REGINA, and Ss.Sylver	4:38
13.	"Locked In"	WiFiGawd	2:58
14.	"U Already"	PRJR and Pearl De Luna	5:25
15.	"Outside"	Monte Booker and VCR	1:31
16.	"Sleep at the Wheel"	Big Rube	1:43
17.	"Last One Alive"		3:56
18.	"8)"	Jack Davey, Ss.Sylver, Aaliyah, and Azul	2:07
19.	"Blackwater"	Big Rube	5:20
Total length:			77:42
