= Leather Blvd =

Studio album by B. Cool-Aid
- Released: March 31, 2023
- Genre: Neo soul; jazz rap; G-funk
- Length: 67:26
- Label: Lex
- Producer: Ahwlee; Butcher Brown; DJ Harrison; iiye; Maurice II; Mndsgn; Navy Blue

B. Cool-Aid chronology
Syrup (2019)	Leather Blvd (2023)

Singles from Leather Blvd
- 1. "Cnt Go Back (Tell Me)" Released: January 16, 2023; 2. "Wassup" Released: February 14, 2023; 3. "Soundgood" Released: March 8, 2023

Leather Blvd ratings
Review scores
Source	Rating
HipHopDX	4.1/5
Loud and Quiet	8/10
Pitchfork	6.5/10

Leather Blvd is the second album by American hip hop duo B. Cool-Aid, consisting of rapper Pink Siifu and producer Ahwlee. The album was released on March 31, 2023, by Lex Records. The album was announced January 16 along with lead single "Cnt Go Back (Tell Me)" which features contributions from V.C.R., Jimetta Rose, Liv.e, Butcher Brown, and Maurice II.

== Release ==
The album's lead single, "Cnt Go Back (Tell Me)", was released January 16. Pitchfork's Dylan Green called it a song about keeping faith despite not knowing the future. He highlighted Pink Siifu's lyrics "Everything's gonna turn around someday/Everything gonna make sense, let's pray", and Maurice II saying "Somebody full of fear, somebody ain't/Minding they business, wanna talk about how I move," as a statement of being done with naysayers. The track opens with Siifu's crooning voice over a "crisp drum pattern and bass", then transitions halfway through where the instrumental "stutters and wears down", leading to Maurice's "mellow, flatly-delivered verse" joined by "ghostly coos" from Liv.e, Jimetta Rose, and V.C.R.

The second single, "Wassup", was released on Valentine's Day, and features contributions from Devin Morrison, Pher Turner, and MoRuf. "Wassup" also came with a music video directed by Matt Zolly and Noah Porter. The song is "hazy, stretched-out", and comes with "a whole lot of melody in Ahwlee's staggered groove, and Pink Siifu rap[ping] in a lovestruck croak." The third single, "Soundgood", was released on March 8, also with features from Liv.e, Jimetta Rose, & V.C.R. The "Soundgood" release also came with an announcement of the album's full track list, revealing more features including Ladybug Mecca of Digable Planets, Quelle Chris, Big Rube, and Fousheé.

== Style ==
The album has been described as neo soul, jazz rap, and G-funk.

== Year-end lists ==
Leather Blvd on year-end lists
Publication	#	Ref.
The Wire	38	

== Track listing ==
Leather Blvd track listing
No.	Title	Producers	Length
1.	"Welcome 2 Leather Boulevard"	iiye; Butcher Brown; DJ Harrison	2:53
2.	"Cnt Go Back (Tell Me)"	Butcher Brown; Ahwlee; Maurice II	5:11
3.	"Diamonds"	Ahwlee; DJ Harrison; iiye	3:08
4.	"Neems (Naima)"	Ahwlee; Mndsgn	4:04
5.	"Soundgood"	Ahwlee	2:43
6.	"Wassup"	Ahwlee; Butcher Brown	5:30
7.	"If U Can See Me (4U)"	Ahwlee	1:57
8.	"Cnt Fk Around"	Ahwlee	6:16
9.	"Fools_LSA"	Ahwlee; Butcher Brown; iiye; DJ Harrison	4:06
10.	"ChalkRoundIt (Talk Abt It)"	iiye; Butcher Brown	2:32
11.	"Craxy!"	Ahwlee; iiye; DJ Harrison	4:13
12.	"Streets Got Pages"	Ahwlee	4:00
13.	"So Soft Salon"	Ahwlee; DJ Harrison; iiye	5:46
14.	"Leather Blvd Ad"	Ahwlee; Navy Blue	1:13
15.	"Brandy, Aaliyah"	Ahwlee	4:54
16.	"We Good at Leather Tht Leather This"	Ahwlee; Butcher Brown; iiye	9:00
Total length:			67:26

== Personnel ==
- Pink Siifu – vocals
- Ahwlee – producer

=== Featured artists ===
Sourced from Stereogum.

- Butcher Brown (1, 2, 9, 11, 16)
- DJ Harrison (1, 3, 9, 13)
- Melanie Charles (1)
- Liv.e (2, 5, 7, 12)
- Jimetta Rose (2, 5, 12, 15)
- V.C.R. (2, 3, 5, 9, 12)
- Maurice II (2)
- Mndsgn (4)
- Akeema-Zane (4)
- Devin Morrison (6)
- Pher (6)
- MoRuf (6, 15)
- Big Rube (9, 14)
- Ladybug Mecca (9, 10, 16)
- Kamila (11, 15)
- Blk Deco (11)
- Salimata (11)
- Nita Darling (13, 16)
- Demae (13)
- Funky Chunky (13)
- Quelle Chris (15)
- Denmark Vessey (15)
- Fousheé (16)
