= Frank (Fly Anakin album) =

Studio album by Fly Anakin
- Released: March 11, 2022
- Recorded: 2019–21
- Genre: Hip-hop
- Length: 38:25
- Label: Lex Records
- Producers: DJ Harrison; EARDRUM; Evidence; Fly Anakin; Foisey; Jay Versace; Lastnamedavid; Like; Madlib; Ohbliv; Sycho Sid

Frank is the debut studio album by American rapper Fly Anakin, released on March 11, 2022 through Lex Records. The album features guest appearances from Pink Siifu, Billz Egypt and Nickelus F, as well as fellow Mutant Academy members Henny L.O. and Big Kahuna OG.

The album cover image was created by photographer Timothy Saccenti and artist Yoshi Sodeoka.

== Background ==
Fly Anakin originally started recording Frank in 2019, shortly after signing to Lex Records. However, the album was put on hold for multiple reasons, which included waiting on a feature from singer Liv.e and also working on the FlySiifu's album with Pink Siifu at the time. Fly Anakin would also delay the album further during the COVID-19 pandemic as he wanted to tour to support the album after its release. The recording for the album was eventually finished after the completion and release of FlySiifu's.

== Reception ==
Professional ratings
Aggregate scores
Source	Rating
Metacritic	84/100
Review scores
Source	Rating
BPM	73%
HipHopDX	4.1/5
Pitchfork	7.5/10
The Line of Best Fit	8/10

Frank was met with critical acclaim. At Metacritic, which assigns a normalized rating out of 100 to reviews from mainstream publications, the album received an average score of 84, based on 7 reviews.

Rolling Stone described the Madlib produced track "No Dough" as "a breakneck tour through everything that makes him a deeply exciting MC." HipHopDX described the album as "His most compelling work to date, each bar from Anakin feels essential, as though the world will stop spinning when he sets down the mic." The Fader wrote that on Frank "his most tongue-twisting verses seem effortless, he knows how good he is — and he refuses to let anyone forget it." The Quietus described the lyricism: "There's no obvious world-building or self-contained story to give Frank the pomp and circumstance you might expect from a major breakthrough rap record in 2022, but he doesn't need one, the subtlety and detail of his songwriting does that on its own."

Paste ranked the album at #47 in their list of the 50 best albums of 2022 so far, in July of that year.

Metacritic stated Frank was the “best reviewed debut” rap album of 2022, and the ninth best reviewed debut album across all genres.

== Track listing ==
No.	Title	Producer(s)	Length
1.	"Love Song (Come Back)"	Foisey	3:19
2.	"Dontbeafraid" (featuring Henny L.O.)	Sycho Sid	2:30
3.	"Sean Price"	Evidence	2:52
4.	"Underdog Theme"	Lastnamedavid	3:18
5.	"Kenneth Cole Collections"	Fly Anakin	1:08
6.	"WaxPoetic"	Ohbliv	1:12
7.	"Black Be The Source" (featuring Billz Egypt & Pink Siifu)	DJ Harrison	3:37
8.	"Ghost" (featuring Nickelus F)	Like	3:32
9.	"Class Clown (Interlude)"	Foisey	2:34
10.	"Bread"	Fly Anakin	1:05
11.	"No Dough"	Madlib	1:31
12.	"Grammy Snubnose"	Eardrum	2:34
13.	"Bad Business (Killswitch)"	Fly Anakin	2:08
14.	"Poisonous Primates"	Foisey	1:42
15.	"Fly Away"	Fly Anakin	0:28
16.	"Telepathic" (featuring Big Kahuna OG)	Lastnamedavid	2:50
17.	"Bag Man"	Jay Versace	2:02
