= Couldn't Wait to Tell You =

2020 studio album by Liv.e

Studio album by Liv.e
- Released: July 31, 2020
- Genre: Psychedelic soul; R&B
- Length: 48:07
- Label: In Real Life Music
- Producer: Baxter; Ben Hixon; Cheflee; Daoud; Kafari; Mejiwahn; Pacific Yew; Salami Rose Joe Louis; Shungu

Liv.e chronology
Hoopdreams (2018)	Couldn't Wait to Tell You (2020)	CWTTY+ (2021)

Singles from Couldn't Wait to Tell You
- 1. "SirLadyMakemFall" Released: January 21, 2020; 2. "LazyEaterBetsOnHerLikeness" Released: February 26, 2020; 3. "Bout These Pipedreams" / "Lessons From My Mistakes... But I Lost Your Number" Released: May 6, 2020; 4. "I Been Livin" Released: July 7, 2020

Couldn't Wait to Tell You is the debut studio album by American R&B singer Liv.e, released on July 31, 2020, by In Real Life. The album was widely praised by music critics.

As part of a deluxe version of Couldn't Wait to Tell You, Liv.e released an EP of six additional songs, entitled CWTTY+, in 2021.

== Background and recording ==
"It's like each song is a different character giving a page out of their diary. There's 21/22 songs, so like 10 characters and they give two pages from their diaries. They're characters I've made up, but it's kind of like [different parts] of myself."

— Liv.e, prior to the release of Couldn't Wait to Tell You

The initial impetus for Couldn't Wait to Tell You was a set of beats sent to Liv.e by producer Mejiwahn. The album was recorded in Liv.e's bedroom in her mother's house in St. Louis, Missouri, over the course of 'a month or so'. Liv.e worked in Urban Outfitters whilst writing the album. Couldn't Wait to Tell You also features production from Ben Hixon, the president of Dallas-based music collective and record label Dolfin Records; Liv.e released several EPs on the label in the late 2010s.

After finishing the recording process, Liv.e went on tour with Earl Sweatshirt in support of his record Some Rap Songs. During this tour, she performed songs which would appear on Couldn't Wait to Tell You. Along with several other artists such as Tyler, the Creator, Earl Sweatshirt had taken notice of Liv.e following her 2018 EP Hoopdreams. In addition to touring with him, Liv.e also featured on the track "Mtomb" from his 2019 EP Feet of Clay. Prior to the release of Couldn't Wait to Tell You, Liv.e would also collaborate with artists such as Black Noi$e and Pink Siifu.

Couldn't Wait to Tell You debuted via livestream on singer Erykah Badu's website as part of her Quarantine Concert Series project; Badu described Liv.e's work as 'an extension of what I am creating'. A music video for "You the One Fish in the Sea" was released in March 2021.

== Critical reception ==
Professional ratings
Aggregate scores
Source	Rating
Metacritic	84/100
Review scores
Source	Rating
Loud and Quiet	9/10
NME	4/5 stars
Pitchfork	8.0/10

Couldn't Wait to Tell You was met with critical acclaim from music critics. On Metacritic, which assigns a normalized rating out of 100 to reviews from mainstream critics, the album received an average score of 84, based on 5 reviews, indicating "universal acclaim".

NME's Luke Morgan Britton praised the album as "just as challenging and expectation-defying" as her previous work, favourably comparing it with the music of Erykah Badu, Solange, Frank Ocean and Keiyaa. Pitchfork's Sheldon Pearce described the album as a "raw, loose, and sometimes shapeless exploration of the R&B form", commenting that "sung, spoken, and rapped, these delightful songs exude personality". Pearce further stated that "throughout Couldn't Wait to Tell You, Liv.e is becoming an unmistakable and singular artist". Michael Appouh of The Quietus described the album as one of "2020’s best projects so far", describing "Bout These Pipedreams" as "the standout track, eliciting a propulsive and psychedelic vocal performance that hasn't been seen on her previous records". Appouh also described "I Been Livin" as "an especially luscious track, its keys oozing with the familiarity of the crate-dug hip hop mastered by Nujabes and Ras G, complimenting the dreamy harmonies".

Joe Goggins of Loud and Quiet wrote that "over the course of a truly eclectic twenty-song suite, [Liv.e] melds genres at will", concluding that the album was a "remarkable debut". Describing Liv.e as "one to watch", The Guardian's Kate Hutchinson commented that Couldn't Wait to Tell You featured "the sort of carefree risk-taking that feels lemon-fresh in 2020".

== Track listing ==
Couldn't Wait to Tell You track listing
No.	Title	Writer(s)	Producer	Length
1.	"What's the Real"	Hailee Olivia Williams; James Whalen; Ahmad Kafari; Louis Shungu; Daoud Anthony; William Cata	Mejiwahn; Kafari; Shungu^{[c]}	1:20
2.	"How It Made Me Feel"	Williams; Whalen; Anthony	Mejiwahn; Daoud^{[c]}	2:45
3.	"Bout These Pipedreams"	Williams	Liv.e	1:28
4.	"Stories with Aunt Liv"	Williams; Whalen; Lindsay Rose Olsen; Imari Mubarak; Shungu	Mejiwahn; Salami Rose Joe Louis; Cheflee; Shungu^{[c]}	2:59
5.	"Lessons From My Mistakes…but I Lost Your Number"	Williams; Whalen; Anthony	Mejiwahn; Daoud^{[c]}	2:40
6.	"About Love at 21"	Williams; Whalen; Anthony	Mejiwahn; Daoud^{[c]}	2:42
7.	"She's My Brand New Crush" (featuring C.S. Armstrong)	Williams; Whalen; Anthony	Mejiwahn; Daoud^{[c]}	2:36
8.	"To Unplug"	Williams; Whalen; Anthony	Mejiwahn; Daoud^{[c]}	3:11
9.	"Cut to the Chase"	Williams; Whalen; Anthony; Shungu	Mejiwahn; Daoud^{[c]}; Shungu^{[c]}	2:20
10.	"Moving On Felt Great and This Feels (Good) Too" (featuring C.S. Armstrong)	Williams; Whalen; Olsen; Mubarak; Kafari; Shungu	Mejiwahn; Salami Rose Joe Louis; Cheflee; Kafari; Shungu^{[c]}	2:44
11.	"It'll Be Okay (Hymnal5)"	Williams; Ben Hixon	Hixon	1:24
12.	"I Been Livin"	Williams; Whalen; Anthony	Mejiwahn; Daoud^{[c]}	3:45
13.	"How She Stay Conflicted…I Hope He Understands"	Williams; Whalen; Anthony	Mejiwahn; Daoud^{[c]}	2:45
14.	"You the One Fish in the Sea"	Williams; Whalen; Anthony	Mejiwahn; Daoud^{[c]}	2:32
15.	"Sirladymakemfall"	Williams; Whalen	Mejiwahn	2:14
16.	"These Past Years…Told by Lord Byron"	Williams; Bryon Neal; Whalen; Anthony; Mubarak; Shungu; Jeffery Williams	Mejiwahn; Pacific Yew; Cheflee; Daoud^{[c]}; Shungu^{[c]}	2:23
17.	"You're Wasted Let's Go Home"	Williams; Whalen; Anthony	Mejiwahn; Daoud^{[c]}	1:48
18.	"Watchu Need Reminded by Akeema Zane"	Williams; Akeema Anthony; Whalen; D. Anthony	Mejiwahn; Daoud^{[c]}	1:20
19.	"LazyEaterBetsOnHerLikeness"	Williams; Whalen	Mejiwahn	2:16
20.	"Bout My Big Man Batter"	Williams; Whalen; D. Anthony; Shungu	Baxter; Daoud^{[c]}; Shungu^{[c]}	2:54
Total length:				48:06

Notes

- ^{^[c]} signifies a co-producer

== CWTTY+ ==
CWTTY+

EP by Liv.e
- Released: July 30, 2021
- Genre: R&B
- Length: 18:08
- Label: In Real Life

Liv.e chronology
Couldn't Wait to Tell You (2020)	CWTTY+ (2021)	Girl in the Half Pearl (2023)

As part of a deluxe edition of Couldn't Wait to Tell You, Liv.e released the EP CWTTY+, a collection of six songs left out of the album, on July 30 2021. NPR named CWTTY+ one of the best R&B albums of 2021, calling it "the tighter, righter appetizer" to Couldn't Wait to Tell You's "main course".

All tracks are written by Liv.e; all tracks produced by Mejiwahn

CWTTY+ track listing
No.	Title	Length
1.	"_21"	2:40
2.	"Lessons Reprise"	1:04
3.	"Winter Songs"	3:54
4.	"Party Life"	2:00
5.	"How It Made Me Feel / Unplug Me Medley"	4:28
6.	"TheWordsCameOutOfMyMouth9 Reprise"	4:02
Total length:		18:08

== Personnel ==
Credits adapted from the album's liner notes

- Liv.e – vocals, production (track 3), artwork, design
- C. S. Armstrong – vocals (tracks 7, 10)
- Cheflee – bass guitar (tracks 4, 10, 16)
- Daoud – keyboards, synthesizer, percussion, co-production
- Ben Hixon – keyboards (track 11), production (track 11)
- Kafari – synthesizer (tracks 1, 10)
- Lord Byron – vocals (track 16)
- Arlington Lowell – artwork, design
- Mejiwahn – drums, MPC 2000XL, percussion, keyboards, synthesizer, production
- Pacific Yew – guitar (track 16)
- Salami Rose Joe Louis – keyboards (tracks 4, 10)
- Shungu – drums, MPC 2000XL, percussion, keyboards, synthesizer, co-production
- Akeema Zane – vocals (track 18)
- Zeroh – mixing, mastering at JAADE Reserve
