= Camp Flog Gnaw =

American music festival

- Logo
- Genre: Hip hop; alternative
- Locations: Dodger Stadium, Los Angeles, California
- Years active: 2012–2019; 2023–present
- Founder: Tyler, the Creator
- Website: campfloggnaw.com

Camp Flog Gnaw Carnival (formerly known as the ODD FUTURE WOLF GANG KILL THEM ALL Carnival or Odd Future carnival) is an annual American music festival and carnival created by Tyler, the Creator and has been held annually since its inception in the fall of 2012, except from 2020 to 2022 (due to the COVID-19 pandemic). The festival features a variety of carnival games and rides, including a Ferris wheel, food vendors, and performances by both notable and breakout artists. Prior to 2016, the festival had only been held for one day. It is always held on a weekend. There is no explicit date(s) on which Camp Flog Gnaw is held. However, past carnivals have been held at either the end of October or the middle of November (with the exception of the first festival, which was held on September 30, 2012). Since 2023, the festivals were live-streamed via Amazon Prime and Twitch.

Poster for Camp Flog Gnaw Carnival 2018

== Namesake ==
After starting as the OFWGKTA Carnival, the festival would soon adopt the name Camp Flog Gnaw. Camp Flog Gnaw was originally the title of the Odd Future tour the initial 2012 carnival was part of, but would become best known as the fictional camp Tyler, The Creator's 2013 concept album Wolf takes place on. Starting in 2013, the carnival would be called Camp Flog Gnaw Carnival with the Odd Future titling being phased out by 2015.

In a 2023 interview with Nardwuar, Tyler explained that the Flog Gnaw title came to be when he was designing a seal for a fictional camp inspired by a series of "Summer Camp Mixes" he had put together. The name itself, described by Tyler "is just Golf Wang backwards, which is just Wolf Gang with the 2 first letters switched."

== Drake controversy ==
Rumors arose during 2019's Camp Flog Gnaw wherein a special guest was to appear and perform at the festival. At that time, discussions online hoped an old affiliate of Odd Future would be the guest, naming Frank Ocean as the one to appear in the festival. The special guest was Drake, and many attendees at the festival were left disappointed. Some fans repeatedly booed Drake during his set, eventually forcing him to walk offstage early. Tyler later expressed his disappointment about the situation through a post on Twitter.

== Lineups ==
Edition	Year	Date	Lineup	Ref.
1	2012	September 30	OFWGKTA, Lil Wayne, Trash Talk, Action Bronson	
2	2013	November 9	Tyler, the Creator, Frank Ocean, Mac Miller, Flying Lotus, Earl Sweatshirt, Schoolboy Q, Mellowhigh, Trash Talk, The Internet, Mike G, Taco	
3	2014	November 8	Pharrell Williams, Tyler, the Creator, Rick Ross, Mac Miller, Earl Sweatshirt, OFWGKTA, The Internet, Hodgy Beats, Left Brain, Domo Genesis, Mike G, Taco, Jasper, DJ Billy Jole, Murs + The Grouch + Eligh, Action Bronson, Step Brothers, Freddie Gibbs, Trash Talk, Vince Staples, Dem Atlas, Cherry Glazerr	
4	2015	November 14	Camp Stage: Snoop Dogg & Tha Dogg Pound, Tyler, the Creator, Atmosphere, Mac Miller, YG, The Internet, Prof, Willow Smith; Flog Stage: ASAP Rocky, Jhené Aiko, OFWGKTA, Flying Lotus, Living Legends, Low End Theory, Pouya; Gnaw Stage: Tokimonsta, Mr. Carmack, Taco, Trash Talk, Danny Brown, AmpLive, Skate Contest	
5	2016	November 12	Camp Stage: Lil Wayne, Tyler, the Creator, ASAP Rocky, Chance the Rapper, The Internet, Tokimonsta, Kamasi Washington, Yuna, Phony Ppl; Flog Stage: Kaytranada, Kehlani, DJ Mustard, Toro y Moi, Lil Uzi Vert, ASAP Ferg, SZA, Domo Genesis, Alina Baraz, Kevin Abstract, Rocket Da Goon	
5	2016	November 13	Camp Stage: Schoolboy Q, EarlWolf, Erykah Badu, Anderson Paak & The Free Nationals, Pretty Lights, Gallant, Kali Uchis, Kilo Kish, MixedByAli; Flog Stage: Death Grips, Joey Badass, SremmLife Crew, Action Bronson, Flatbush Zombies, Taco, Dillon Francis, Vince Staples, Sleigh Bells, Mike G, Left Brain, The Garden	
6	2017	October 28	Camp Stage: Lana Del Rey, Tyler, the Creator, Mac Miller, Syd, Mac DeMarco, Brockhampton, Fidlar, The Garden, Left Brain, Mike G Flog Stage: Justice, Migos, Vince Staples, Denzel Curry, 6lack, Kelela, Kamaiyah, Roy Ayers, Wednesday Campanella, Kittens; Gnaw Stage: DJ Aux Cord, Howmanyollies, VenessaMichaels, Yung Hershey, DJ Osh Kosh	
6	2017	October 29	Camp Stage: Kid Cudi, Solange, ASAP Rocky, The Internet, Taco, Kehlani, Domo Genesis, Steve Lacy, Jorja Smith, Sam Gellaitry; Flog Stage: 2 Chainz, Earl Sweatshirt, Lil Yachty, Alison Wonderland, Kelis, Playboi Carti, Terror Jr, Trash Talk, Hodgy, Mild High Club; Gnaw Stage: DJ Noodles, Ricci Riera, SuperDuperBrick, DJ Zo, Murda Child, Dirty Mop	
7	2018	November 10	Camp Stage: SZA, Tyler, the Creator, ASAP Rocky, The Internet, Rex Orange County, Raphael Saadiq, Hobo Johnson & The Lovemakers, Turnstile, Slow Hollows; Flog Stage: Pusha T, Majid Jordan, Kali Uchis, Playboi Carti, Virgil Abloh, Little Dragon, Wallows, Mike G, + Sounds; Gnaw Stage: Red Corvette, Jimbo Jenkins, DJ Zo, Violet Waters	
7	2018	November 11	Camp Stage: Kids See Ghosts, Post Malone, Lauryn Hill, Jorja Smith, Taco, Bane's World, Raveena, Tierra Whack, Men I Trust; Flog Stage: Brockhampton, Earl Sweatshirt, Billie Eilish, Jaden Smith, Flatbush Zombies, Domo Genesis, Left Brain, Kilo Kish, Ama Lou, Ruel; Gnaw Stage: VenessaMichaels, Murda Child, Alexander Spit, Andre Power	
8	2019	November 9	Camp Stage: Solange, Tyler, the Creator, Juice WRLD, The Internet, Dominic Fike; Flog Stage: 21 Savage, Daniel Caesar, Summer Walker, Thundercat, Yuna, Slowthai, Juto, Elephant Gym; Gnaw Stage: Yasiin Bey, Omar Apollo, Domo Genesis, Choker, Mike G, Tommy Genesis, Esta	
8	2019	November 10	Camp Stage: Drake, ASAP Rocky, Lil Uzi Vert, YG, Brockhampton, FKA Twigs, Clairo; Flog Stage: DaBaby, H.E.R., Goldlink, Taco, Willow Smith, Daisy, Radiant Children, Laundry Day; Gnaw Stage: Earl Sweatshirt, Blood Orange, IDK, Left Brain, Na-Kel Smith, Cruel Santino, Destiny Rogers	
9	2023	November 11	Camp Stage: The Hillbillies (Kendrick Lamar and Baby Keem), Tyler, the Creator, Kali Uchis, Turnstile, Beabadoobee; Flog Stage: Fuerza Regida, Ice Spice, Kevin Abstract, Teezo Touchdown, Balming Tiger, Fana Hues, Maxo; Gnaw Stage: Clipse, BADBADNOTGOOD, Ravyn Lenae, Paris Texas, Left Brain, Baby Rose, Liv.e	
9	2023	November 12	Camp Stage: SZA, Rex Orange County, Dominic Fike, Syd, Willow Smith; Flog Stage: Cuco, Earl Sweatshirt, Lil Yachty, PinkPantheress, Domo Genesis, Daisy World, Spinall, Khamari; Gnaw Stage: Toro y Moi, D4vd, AG Club, Redveil, Mike G, Maxo Kream, Julie	
10	2024	November 16	Camp Stage: Tyler, the Creator, Daniel Caesar, Kaytranada, Omar Apollo, Doechii, Concrete Boys, Lithe, Rio Amor; Flog Stage: Schoolboy Q, Denzel Curry, Vince Staples, Action Bronson, Latin Mafia, Kenny Mason, Amelia Moore; Gnaw Stage: Mase, The Alchemist & Friends, Sampha, Yves Tumor, Mike G, Wisp, Laila!	
10	2024	November 17	Camp Stage: Playboi Carti, Mustard & Friends, the Marías, Erykah Badu, Syd, Raye; Flog Stage: Blood Orange, Earl Sweatshirt, Tommy Richman, Matt Champion, Domo Genesis, Jordan Ward, Jean Dawson, Hana Vu; Gnaw Stage: FM MOOD: A Tribute to MF Doom, Faye Webster, Sexyy Red, André 3000: New Blue Sun, Orion Sun, Left Brain, Na-Kel Smith, The Mainliners	
11	2025	November 22 (Note: The 2025 festival was delayed by one week due to a rain storm, leading to Clairo, Don Toliver, Men I Trust, Sombr, Tems, and The Alchemist to be removed from the lineup. Kali Uchis, Blood Orange, Geese & Fakemink were announced as new acts.)	Camp Stage: Childish Gambino, Tyler, the Creator, Kali Uchis, Fakemink, PartyOf2, Samara Cyn, Navy Blue, La Reezy; Flog Stage: Clipse, Malcolm Todd, Paris Texas, Geese, AG Club, AZChike; Gnaw Stage: Ca7riel & Paco Amoroso, Earl Sweatshirt, Chezile, BB Trickz, Mike G, Ecca Vandal, Zelooperz	
11	2025	November 23	Camp Stage: ASAP Rocky, Doechii, Blood Orange, Geezer (Kevin Abstract & Dominic Fike), Zack Fox; Flog Stage: T-Pain, Larry June & 2 Chainz, Teezo Touchdown, Luh Tyler, Domo Genesis, Deb Never, Kilo Kish, Ray Vaughn; Gnaw Stage: GloRilla, Thundercat, Fousheé, Mike, Left Brain, Alemeda, Gia Fu	
12	2026	November 14	Camp Stage: Don Toliver, Tyler, The Creator, Turnstile, Lola Young, Audrey Nuna, Nourished by Time, Wyatt Waddell, Sasha Marie; Flog Stage:Leon Thomas, JID, 2hollis, Jane Remover, Ama, Natanya, Liim; Gnaw Stage: Wallows, Earl Sweatshirt & Mike, Vince Staples, Domo Genesis, Left Brain, Gena	
12	2026	November 15	Camp Stage: Future, Steve Lacy, Not for Radio, Thee Sacred Souls, 54 Ultra; Flog Stage: Isaiah Rashad, Latin Mafia, Lupe Fiasco, Nsqk, Quadeca, Mike G, Nomi., 310babii Gnaw Stage: The Alchemist & Friends, Magdalena Bay, Syd, Concrete Boys, Gabriel Jacoby, Casey Veggies, Nick Cheo	
