= Jay Versace =

American record producer and former internet personality

- Born: Jahlil Gunter; January 24, 1998 (age 28)
- Origin: Pleasantville, New Jersey, U.S.
- Genres: Hip hop; boom bap
- Occupation: Record producer
- Years active: 2014–present

Jahlil Gunter (born January 24, 1998), known professionally as Jay Versace, is an American record producer and former Internet personality. He began posting comedy videos onto Vine as a teenager, and amassed over three million followers on the platform before shifting focus onto a career in music production in 2018. He has since been credited on albums SOS (2022) by SZA and Call Me If You Get Lost (2021) by Tyler, the Creator. His other work includes songs for Doja Cat, Lil Yachty, Boldy James, and Westside Gunn.

== Early life ==
Versace is from Pleasantville, New Jersey. His moniker was inspired by a Vine video in which American rapper Riff Raff feeds his dog "Versace water from the fountain of life".

== Career ==
=== 2014–2017: Social media career ===
In 2014, Versace began making comedic videos onto the video-sharing platform Vine, usually involving reenactments of certain scenarios involving his family members, friends, and entertainers. His work was also noted to involve the amplification of the spirituality, creativity, and mental health of black people. He relocated to Los Angeles in 2016 at the age of 18. He was nominated for Viner of the Year at the 8th Shorty Awards. Versace had amassed over three million followers and two billion total views on Vine before the platform was discontinued in January 2017. Thereafter, he turned to other social media platforms, amassing 2 million followers on Instagram and 500,000 subscribers on YouTube. He also starred alongside American actors Danielle Campbell and Nathan Kress in his own Fullscreen web series, Jay Versace is Stuck in the 90s, which was nominated for Best Web Series at the 10th Shorty Awards. Versace signed a representation contract with United Talent Agency in January 2018, and then was slated to feature alongside American internet personality Miles McKenna in an eight-part web series by Portal A Interactive titled My Wizard & Me, yet this did not come to fruition.

=== 2018–present: Music career ===
Versace started experimenting with music production for the first time in May 2018, with help from his musician friends Knxwledge and Pink Siifu. He began posting atmospheric, lo-fi music instrumentals to his SoundCloud account. Versace approached American rapper Westside Gunn and asked to work together, before the latter discovered his account and ended up using one of Versace's first-ever songs on his own album, Pray for Paris (2020), titling the track "Versace". He then produced all tracks on the mixtape, The Versace Tape (2020) by American rapper Boldy James, which became Boldy's first-ever release on Griselda Records in August 2020. In March 2021, Versace contributed a remix version of the song "Lay_Up.m4a" by Denzel Curry and Kenny Beats to the duo's remix album, Unlocked 1.5 (2021). He also produced the song "Safari" off of American rapper Tyler, the Creator's sixth studio album Call Me If You Get Lost (2021), which won the award for Best Rap Album at the 65th Annual Grammy Awards. Released in August 2022, the track "On God" by American rappers Meechy Darko and Freddie Gibbs, and Canadian producer A-Trak, which was co-produced by Versace and Dot da Genius. Versace then produced the songs "SOS" and "Smoking on My Ex Pack" from American singer SZA's second studio album, SOS (2022), which earned him critical acclaim and commercial success. SZA credits her first attempts at rap music to Versace, who encouraged her to "talk her shit".

== Personal life ==
Versace came out as queer via a Snapchat post in 2016, claiming that "I love people in general idgaf what gender you are". His mother, Nikesha Dolly Gunter, died of illness in May 2022.

== Production discography ==
Year	Artist	Album	Song
2020	Westside Gunn	Pray for Paris	"Versace"
2020	Boldy James	The Versace Tape	"Maria"
2020	Boldy James	The Versace Tape	"Nu Wave"
2020	Boldy James	The Versace Tape	"Cartier" (featuring ElCamino)
2020	Boldy James	The Versace Tape	"Brick Van Exel"
2020	Boldy James	The Versace Tape	"Long Live Julio"
2020	Boldy James	The Versace Tape	"Monte Criso"
2020	Boldy James	The Versace Tape	"Cardinal Sin"
2020	Boldy James	The Versace Tape	"Bentayga"
2020	Boldy James	The Versace Tape	"Roxycontin" (featuring Keisha Plum, Tiona Deniece and Westside Gunn)
2020	Pink Siifu and Fly Anakin	FlySiifu's	"Mind Right"
2020	Lil Yachty	Lil Boat 3.5	"Lil Diamond Boy" (bonus track)
2021	Denzel Curry and Kenny Beats	Unlocked 1.5	"Lay_Up.m4a (Jay Versace Version)"
2021	Patrick Paige II	If I Fail Are We Still Cool?	"Who Am I
2021	Tyler, the Creator	Call Me If You Get Lost	"Safari" (co-produced with Tyler, the Creator)
2021	Westside Gunn	Hitler Wears Hermes 8: Side B	"Free Kutter" (featuring Jay Electronica)
2022	Fly Anakin	Frank	"Bag Man"
2022	Draft Day	Non-album single	"How Far Will I Go" (featuring Lil Yachty)
2022	Xavier Omär	b l u r r	"A Dream"
2022	Meechy Darko	Gothic Luxury	"On God" (featuring A-Trak and Freddie Gibbs) (co-produced with Dot Da Genius)
2022	SZA	SOS	"SOS"
2022	SZA	SOS	"Smoking on My Ex Pack"
2023	Summer Walker	Clear 2: Soft Life	"Pull Up"
2023	Summer Walker	Clear 2: Soft Life	"New Type" (featuring Childish Gambino)
2023	Doja Cat	Scarlet	"97"
2023	Doja Cat	Scarlet	"Often"
2023	Doja Cat	Scarlet	"Love Life"
2024	Buddy	Don't Forget to Breath	"Free My Mind"
2024	Vince Staples	Dark Times	"Étouffée"
2024	FLO	Access All Areas	"Caught Up"
2025	JID	God Does Like Ugly	"VCRs" (featuring Vince Staples)
2025	K Camp	Kiss 6	"Floating" (featuring Ari Lennox)
2025	Joey Badass	Lonely at the Top	"Speedin' Through the Rain"
2025	Ant Clemons	Happy 2 Be Here With You	"Singing in the Rain"
2025	Moruf	Moolodic: Hotep Luxury	"Love from Afar" (featuring Fousheé)
2025	Mavi	The Pilot	"Mender"
2025	Doechii	Non-album single	"Girl, Get Up" (featuring SZA)

== Awards and nominations ==
Award	Year	Category	Recipient(s) and nominee(s)	Result	Ref.
BET Social Awards	2019	Social Hustle Award	Himself	Nominated	
Shorty Awards	2016	Viner of the Year	Himself	Finalist	
Shorty Awards	2018	Best Web Series	Jay Versace Is Stuck in the 90s	Nominated	
Soul Train Awards	2016	Internet Soul Sensation Badu Award	Himself	Won	
