= The Pleasure Is Yours =

2026 album by Gena

Studio album by Gena
- Released: February 27, 2026
- Recorded: 2025–2026
- Genre: Neo soul; hip-hop
- Length: 43:15
- Label: Lex
- Producer: Karriem Riggins

Karriem Riggins chronology
YHWH Is Love as Jahari Massamba Unit with Madlib (2024)	The Pleasure is Yours (2026)

Liv.e chronology
Girl in the Half Pearl (2023)	The Pleasure is Yours (2026)

Singles from The Pleasure Is Yours
- 1. "Circlesz" Released: November 12, 2025; 2. "Howweflow" Released: December 11, 2025; 3. "LeadItUp" Released: January 15, 2026

The Pleasure Is Yours is the debut studio album by American neo soul duo Gena. It was released on February 27, 2026. Gena is Dallas vocalist, songwriter and producer Liv.e and Detroit drummer-producer Karriem Riggins. The project grew after Riggins met Liv.e through another session and was struck by her vocals. The name GENA stands for "God Energy, Naturally Amazing" and also nods to Gina from Martin. Much of the album was made remotely, with Liv.e recording most of her vocals in her home while Riggins built largely live-instrumental tracks, playing bass, piano, LinnDrum, Rhodes and Wurlitzer, and drawing on tape saturation and analogue textures.

== Critical reception ==
Professional ratings
Aggregate scores
Source	Rating
Metacritic	83/100
Review scores
Source	Rating
AllMusic	4/5 stars
The Needle Drop	8/10
Pitchfork	8.0/10

On release, The Pleasure Is Yours was met with positive reviews that emphasised the chemistry between Liv.e and Karriem Riggins. On Metacritic, which assigns a normalized rating out of 100 to reviews from mainstream critics, the album received an average score of 83 out of 100, which indicates "universal acclaim", based on 6 reviews. Pitchfork described the album as "cosmic experimentalism and amorphous funk," crediting it with "improvisational spirit and real feeling." AllMusic characterised it concisely as "delightfully askew R&B." Reviewing the album for The Needle Drop, Anthony Fantano highlighted its "winding tapestry of many tracks, some pretty brief, but they all add up into this very entrancing, vibrant tracklist, bringing together elements of lofi hip hop, soul, jazz rap, and some trippy takes on RnB" and framed the record as an example of "music as play," praising its relaxed surface and detailed production.

The Pleasure Is Yours received mid-year recognition across several 2026 "best so far" lists. Pitchfork included the album in its list comparing it to, "Prince’s 1999; lo-fi beats to study to (non-derogatory); Erykah Badu’s humor; drinking 40s with skateboarders in Los Angeles". Stereogum placed it at number 33 on its 50 Best Albums of 2026 So Far list, describing the album as "so engaging on a surface level that you might find yourself compulsively playing it back, and there’s so much detail (rhythmic, textural, metatextual) that you’ll probably have some fresh epiphany with each subsequent listen". Paste also included the record, calling it a "picture-perfect rap album." Rolling Stone selected "Who’s Got a Problem With Gena" for its best songs of 2026 so far list, highlighting it as a "delightful throwback to the synthesized and beat-heavy grooves of the aughts, with sounds clearly inspired by the likes of D’Angelo and Sa-Ra Creative Partners". In NPR Music's 2026 mid-year list, Rodney Carmichael described the album as "blackity-Blackness refracted through the kaleidoscope of collective memory". Vulture included the album in their "The Best Albums of the Year So Far" list, writing "The Pleasure Is Yours falls into the same category of zesty R&B Madvillain successors as Anderson .Paak and Knxwledge’s NxWorries."

== Track listing ==
All tracks are written by Karriem Riggins and Liv.e. All tracks are produced by Karriem Riggins.

No.	Title	Length
1.	"Who's Got a Problem With Gena"	1:56
2.	"Theybetterbegladihavetherapy"	1:48
3.	"Left The Club Like "Really Nigga!""	1:39
4.	"You've Outdone Yourself Today"	1:26
5.	"Unspokern"	3:27
6.	"TGD"	3:13
7.	"readymade"	2:03
8.	"Douwannabwithastar"	2:45
9.	"This Is So Crazy"	3:40
10.	"Lead It Up"	2:48
11.	"Howweflow"	2:41
12.	"Doobie Doo Wew"	2:13
13.	"Circlez"	2:21
14.	"Dream a Twinkle"	5:17
15.	"Thatsmyluvr"	3:34
16.	"omo iya ati baba"	2:17
Total length:		43:15

== Personnel ==
Credits adapted from the album's Apple Music song credits.

Gena

- Karriem Riggins – production, drums
- Liv.e – vocals

Additional musicians

- Trunino Lowe trumpet on (2)(11)
- Stewart Cole horn on (8)
- James Francies keyboards on (5)(8)(11)
- Patrick Warren strings on (5)
- Brandon Haru keyboards on (6)
- Telemakus keyboards, bass guitar on (7)
- Isaiah Sharkey Guitar on (9)(10)(14)
- Annastezhaa Mitchell Curtis harp on (14)
- Burniss Bishop bass guitar on (14)

Technical

- Kyle Hoffmann – mixing engineer
- Dave Cooley – mastering
