= Divine Council (group) =

American hip hop group

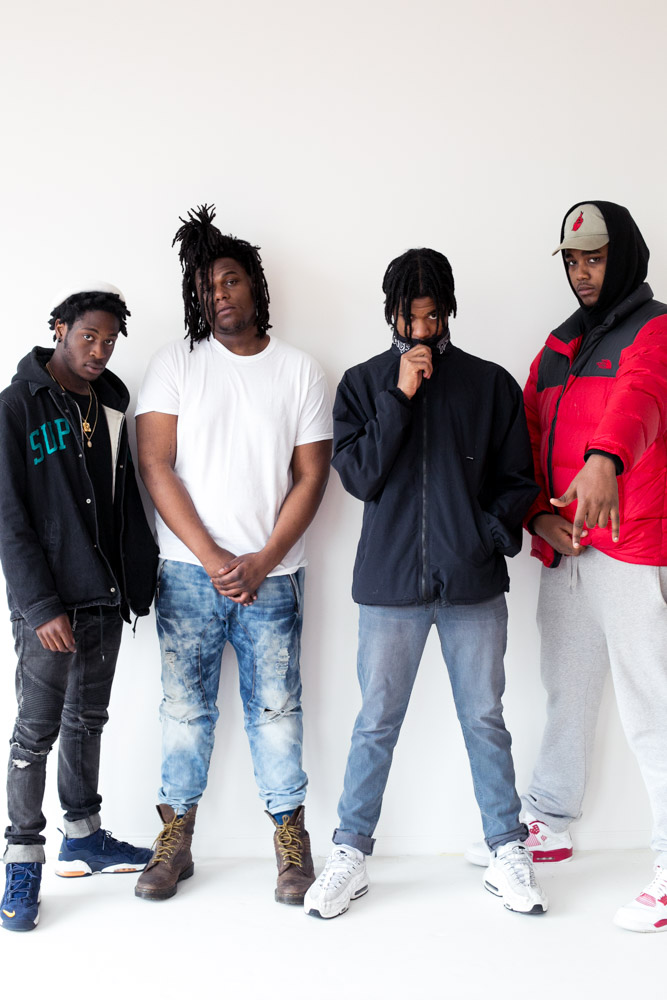
- Divine Council in 2016; Left to right: Lord Linco, $ilkmoney, Cyrax, and IcyTwat.

Background information
- Also known as: DB$B; DivCo; DirtbagShawtyBwoyz
- Origin: Richmond, Virginia
- Genres: Experimental hip hop; R&B
- Years active: 2013–2017
- Label: Epic
- Past members: Cyrax; $ilkmoney; IcyTwat; Lord Linco
- Website: www.council-world.com (defunct)

Divine Council was an American hip hop group originating from Richmond, Virginia. They were made up of artists Cyrax, IcyTwat, Lord Linco and $ilkmoney, who was named to Rolling Stone's "10 New Artists You Need to Know" in 2016. The group's single "P. Sherman (PS42WW$)" peaked at #1 on the Billboard Spotify Viral 50 chart in May 2016, with the release of their Gold debut EP in August that same year.

== History ==
The idea for Divine Council started with Virginia-based rapper Lord Linco. He was then joined by Cyrax! and $ilkmoney, two other Virginia-based rappers. The group released several tracks including Shorty and FOOLIE with most of the group's production handled by IcyTwat. The group then gained recognition in the underground hip-hop scene and amassed a large following on social media.

Divine Council played local gigs around the Richmond area prior to getting a New York show for CMJ's "Leaders of the New Cool" artist showcase in October 2015, founded by Chris Turner & Dominique Maldonado of Hollywood East ENT . In New York, they met André 3000 who introduced himself as a fan of the group. Divine Council managed by Chris Turner & Dominique Maldonado later signed with Epic Records with André 3000's endorsement. The group played SXSW and Rolling Loud in 2016 and released their debut EP on Epic Records in August that same year.

In September 2017, IcyTwat stated that he was no longer a member of Divine Council and hasn't been actively a part of the group since July, he has also stated that Cyrax! and $ilkmoney are the only remaining members of Divine Council, although this hasn't been confirmed by either member.

Later in 2017 Linco confirmed his departure from the group on Instagram Live, stating he and IcyTwat remain close friends. Linco stated his departure had to do with a girl he fell in love with and should not have, admitting his group mates were right all along. IcyTwat's departure from Divine Council remains a mystery, and he has avoided the question in interviews, but neither has removed their DB$B tattoos. $ilkmoney talked about Linco's departure on the song "BAF" off his solo album, I Hate My Life And I Really Wish People Would Stop Telling Me Not To, stating that he still views him as a brother and their feud does nothing for either party. Cyrax! has remained silent on the matter, but wishes his former group mates well in their respective careers.

Sometime in 2018, Divine Council was dropped by Epic records, with several tracks and their debut album all going unreleased. Only small leaks are available online. Some suggest it had to do with Linco and IcyTwat leaving the group, while some claim it was a mutual departure on both sides.

As of April 2020, Cyrax! and $ilkmoney have both released solo projects that have been well received by the fans, with the idea of carrying on the Divine Council name. Since leaving Divine Council, Lord Linco changed his name to Loveybone and released a solo album. His career had been strained by frequent stints in prison since 2018, and he would later pass away in June 2025, the details of his death are currently unknown.

There are no public plans of an album or group reunion, however IcyTwat has stated he would be interested in returning under the right circumstances.

IcyTwat has the letters DB$B tattooed on his right hand. In August 2022 IcyTwat posted pictures to Twitter and Tumblr showing his updated hand tattoos. The new photos show both B's and the D in DB$B have been crossed out with a red X. The $ still remains.

== Discography ==
=== EP's ===
List of EP's
Title	Album details
Council World	Released: 1 August 2016; Label: Epic Records; Format: Digital download
DBSB	Released: 29 April 2017; Label: Epic Records; Format: Digital download

=== Singles ===
Title	Year	Peak chart positions	Album
Title	Year	Spotify Viral 50	Album
"P. Sherman (PS42WW$)"	2016	1	Non-album single

=== Cyrax' Discography ===
List of EP's
Title	Album details
Lone Bwoy	Released: 1 July 2015; Label: Format: Digital download
Stay Active	Released: 1 September 2018; Label: Format: Digital download
Stay Active 2	Released: 26 February 2020; Label: Format: Digital download
Soul Oasis	Released: 15 July 2024; Label: Format: Digital download

=== Silkmoney's Discography ===
List of EP's/Mixtapes
Title	Album details
Wan Lovey: A Love Story EP	Released: 11 June 2015; Label: Format: Digital download
I Hate My Life and I Really Wish People Would stop telling me Not To	Released: 11 December 2018; Label: Format: Digital download
G.T.F.O.M.D: There’s Not Enough Room for All You Motha Fuckas to Be on It Like This	Released: 15 December 2019; Label: Format: Digital download
Attack of the Future Shocked, Flesh Covered, Meatbags of the 85	Released: 20 May 2020; Label: Format: Digital download
I Don't Give a Fuck About This Rap Shit, Imma Just Drop Until I Don't Feel Like It Anymore	Released: 15 November 2022; Label: DB$B Records; Format: Digital download
Who Waters the Wilting Giving Tree Once the Leaves Dry Up and Fruits No Longer Bear?	Released: 18 July 2025; Label: DB$B Records, Lex Records; Format: Digital download

=== Lord Linco's Discography ===
List of EP's/Mixtapes
Title	Album details
Unlit	Released: 19 October 2013; Label: Format: Digital download
Dutty	Released: 13 December 2014; Label: Format: Digital download
Moonchild EP	Released: 2015; Label: Format: Digital download
Yardie EP	Released: 7 February 2015; Label: Format: Digital download
LHDY: The Sessions EP	Released: 15 August 2015; Label: Format: Digital download
Love Hard, Die Young	Released: 21 November 2015; Label: Format: Digital download
Virgo EP	Released: 2016; Label: Format: Digital download
Love Hard, Die Young 2 EP	Released: 8 March 2018; Label: Format: Digital download
After I Self Destruct	Released: 27 July 2019; Label: Format: Digital download

=== IcyTwat's discography ===
List of EP's/mixtapes
Title	Album details
Hawaiian Juug	Released: 25 March 2014; Label: Format: Digital download
Cyber Palace	Released: 4 June 2014; Label: Format: Digital download
Icy Cathedral	Released: 25 July 2014; Label: Format: Digital download
06 Elegance	Released: 28 November 2018; Label: Format: Digital download
Fendi EP	Released: 1 January 2015; Label: Format: Digital download
Dior Junts	Released: 14 February 2015; Label: Format: Digital download
I Think Im Fabo EP	Released: 2015; Label: Format: Digital download
Stain EP	Released: 2015; Label: Format: Digital download
Im High as a Bitch, Lol	Released: 7 August 2015; Label: Format: Digital download
Throwaway EP	Released: 2016; Label: Format: Digital download
Milk	Released: May 12, 2017; Label: Format: Digital download
FUBU Vs TWAT EP	Released: 2 March 2018; Label: Format: Digital ownload
Dream Bwoy EP	Released: 25 May 2018; Label: Format: Digital download
Good Pussy EP	Released: 2 November 2018; Label: Format: Digital download
G4ost EP	Released: 19 February 2021; Label: Format: Digital download
Siddhi	Released: 28 January 2022; Label: Format: Digital download
Siddhi World	Released: 23 September 2022; Label: Format: Digital download
Have Mercy On Us	Released: 15 June 2023; Label: Format: Digital download
4 tha Troopz	Released: 4 July 2023; Label: Format: Digital download
Final Boss	Released: 28 July 2023; Label: Format: Digital download
Magic As Usual	Released: 16 February 2024; Label: Format: Digital download
