= Pardon My French (Jahari Massamba Unit album) =

Studio album by Jahari Massamba Unit
- Released: November 27, 2020
- Genre: Jazz fusion
- Length: 48:02
- Label: Madlib Invazion
- Producer: Madlib; Karriem Riggins

Jahari Massamba Unit chronology
| Pardon My French (2020) | YHWH Is Love (2024) |

Pardon My French is a 2020 studio album by Jahari Massamba Unit, a collective name for American hip hop musician Madlib and American jazz drummer Karriem Riggins. It has received positive reviews from critics.

== Reception ==
Editors at AllMusic rated this album 4 out of 5 stars, with critic Thom Jurek writing that his release "is an exploration and statement of Afro-futurist jazz refracted through hip-hop, vanguard, Eastern and Latin influences, and funk" that is "extremely listenable as a mind-blowing experiment to encounter and absorb". Steven Loftin at The Line of Best Fit, rated this album an 8 out of 10, calling the music "an expressive jazz tour de force" that is an "endless offering" to both casual and close listeners. Pitchfork's Jay Balfour rated this work a 7.0 out of 10, stating that "it’s exciting to hear a musician like Madlib untethered from the moment, and a testament to Riggins that he can create this type of space in the first place" and critiquing that while the album "is not always immediately gratifying... it’s always moving towards something".

== Track listing ==
All songs written by Otis Jackson and Karriem Riggins

1. "Je prendrai le Romanée-Conti (Putain de Leroy)" – 2:00
2. "Les Jardins esméraldins (Pour Caillard)" – 1:14
3. "Un Bordeaux pré-phylloxéra (Pour le riche enculé)" – 3:10
4. "Deux Fakes Jayers (Aussi pour le riche enculé)" – 3:32
5. "Riesling pour Robert" – 4:39
6. "Du Morgon au Moulin-à-vent (Pour Duke)" – 9:08
7. "Trou du cul (Ode au sommelier arrogant)" – 2:35
8. "Etude Montrachet" – 4:35
9. "Le Feu (Pour Belluard)" – 0:33
10. "Merde (Basse-cour)" – 5:11
11. "Inestimable Le Clos" – 4:34
12. "La Closerie (Pour Prévost)" – 2:05
13. "Hommage à la vielle garde (Pour Lafarge et Rinaldi)" – 4:48

== Personnel ==
Jahari Massamba Unit

- Madlib – rapping, instrumentation, recording, production
- Karriem Riggins – drums, recording, production, mixing

Additional personnel

- Jason Bitner – audio mastering
- Lisa Donnadieu – translation
- Jeff Jank – artwork
- Emile Omar – translation

== See also ==
- 2020 in American music
- 2020 in jazz
- List of 2020 albums
