= Fly Anakin =

American rapper

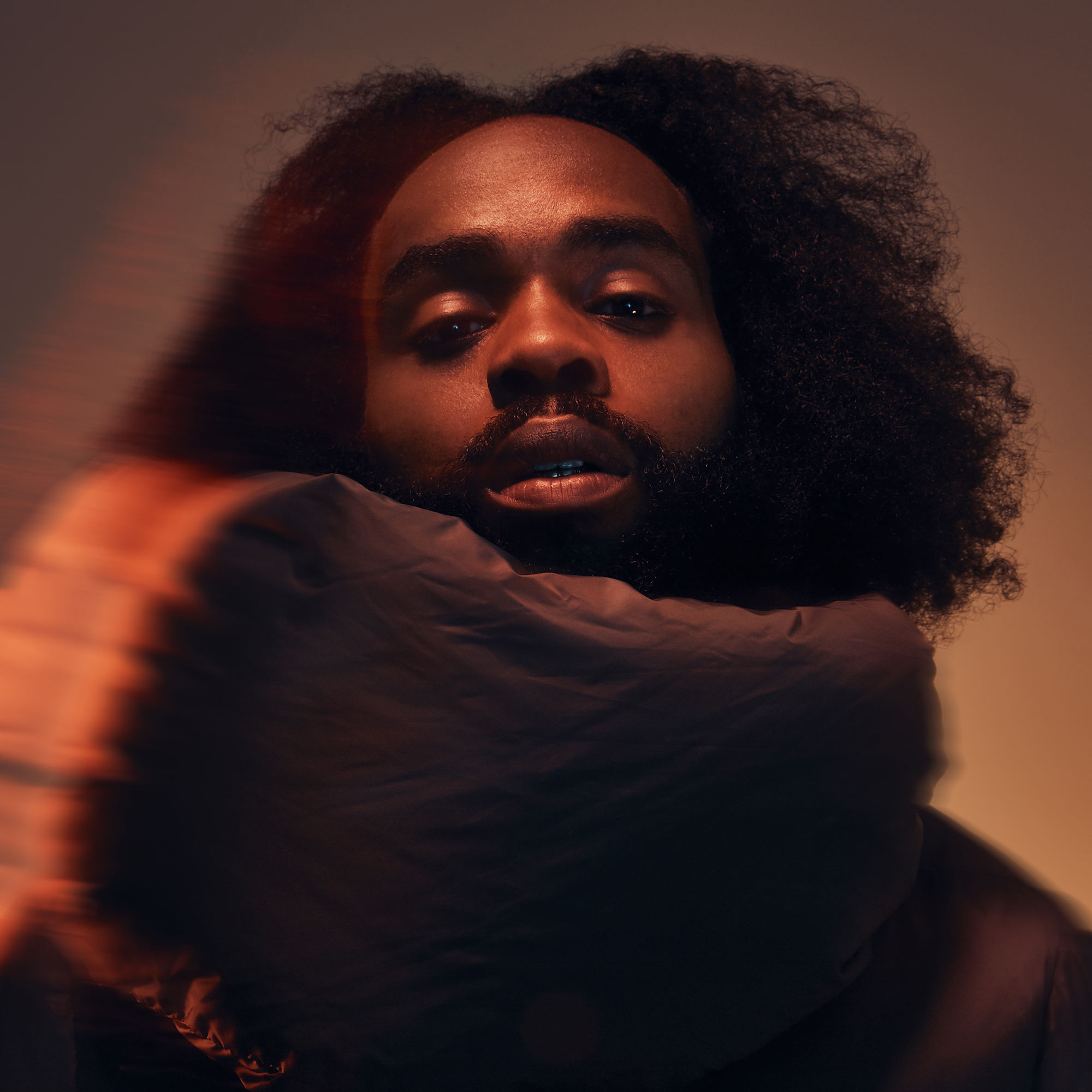
- Fly Anakin in 2021, taken from the Frank promotional photoshoot by Timothy Saccenti

Background information
- Born: Frank L. Walton, Jr. July 9, 1994 (age 32)
- Origin: Richmond, Virginia, U.S.
- Genres: Hip hop
- Years active: 2014–present
- Labels: Lex; Mutant Academy
- Member of: Mutant Academy
- Website: flyanakin.com

Frank L. Walton, Jr known professionally as Fly Anakin, is an American rapper and record producer from Richmond, Virginia. He is a co-founder of the Richmond hip-hop collective Mutant Academy.

== Career ==
Fly Anakin began releasing music in 2014 with the mixtape Mirrors_episode1, a collaboration with future Mutant Academy member Ewonee. The release initiated a sustained period of independent output, during which he self-released more than a dozen mixtapes and EPs in six years. Throughout this period, he built a local following by performing regularly in Richmond, including at house shows and independent venues.

His debut solo studio album, Frank, was released in 2022 and featured production from Madlib, Evidence, and fellow members of Mutant Academy. The album received widespread critical acclaim; Metacritic assigned it a score of 84, indicating "universal acclaim". Frank was subsequently included on several mid-year lists of the best albums of 2022, including those published by Complex, HipHopDX, Paste, The Quietus, and Uproxx. In December, Metacritic ranked Frank as the highest-reviewed debut rap album of 2022 and the ninth highest-reviewed debut album across all genres.

In 2023, Fly Anakin released two collaborative EPs with the artist Foisey, titled Skinemaxxx (Side A) and Skinemaxxx (Side B). Issued as companion projects, the EPs formed part of a series of collaborative releases within Fly Anakin’s discography, including work with Mutant Academy member Foisey.

Fly Anakin's group, Mutant Academy, released their debut album, Keep Holly Alive in October 2024 via Roc Nation Distribution. The album was included in Pitchfork’s list of the Best Rap Albums of 2024.

(The) Forever Dream, Fly Anakin’s second studio album, was announced in January 2025 and released in April 2025. The album was made in collaboration with Quelle Chris, who served as executive producer and contributed vocals and production. Additional production was provided by The Alchemist, Shungu, and Foisey, with guest appearances from $ilkmoney, BbyMutha, Pink Siifu, Denmark Vessey, and Nickelus F. (The) Forever Dream received positive reviews from critics. Coverage highlighted the album’s cohesive structure and the role of Quelle Chris’s executive production in shaping its overall direction, with particular attention given to Fly Anakin’s writing and collaborative choices. Pitchfork ranked the second single taken from the album, "My N*gga", as the third best track in their end of year article The 40 Best Rap Songs of 2025.

== Discography ==
=== Studio albums ===
- Frank (2022)
- (The) Forever Dream (2025)

=== Collaborative albums ===
- Open House (with Henny L.O) (2014)
- Chapel Drive (with Koncept Jack$on) (2017)
- Panama Plus (with Koncept Jack$on & TUAMIE) (2017)
- Backyard Boogie (with Ohbliv) (2018)
- Emergency Raps, Vol. 4 (with TUAMIE) (2019)
- Holly Water (with Big Kahuna OG) (2019)
- FlySiifu's (with Pink Siifu) (2020)
- Skinemaxxx (with Foisey) (2023)
- Keep Holly Alive (with Mutant Academy) (2024)

=== Extended plays and mixtapes ===
- mirrors_episode.1 (with Ewonee) (2014)
- Elsewhere Ave. (2015)
- The Grand Scheme of Things (2016)
- Velvet Type Joints (2016)
- People Like Us (2017)
- Anakin & Friends: Episode 1 (2021)
- $mokebreak (with Pink Siifu) (2021)
- At the End of the Day (2020)
- Pixote (2021)
- mirrors_episode.2 (with Ewonee) (2022)
- Stop Tryna Hack My Facebook (2023)
- Anakin & Friends 2 (2024)
- Night Shift (2026)
