= Karriem Riggins =

American drummer

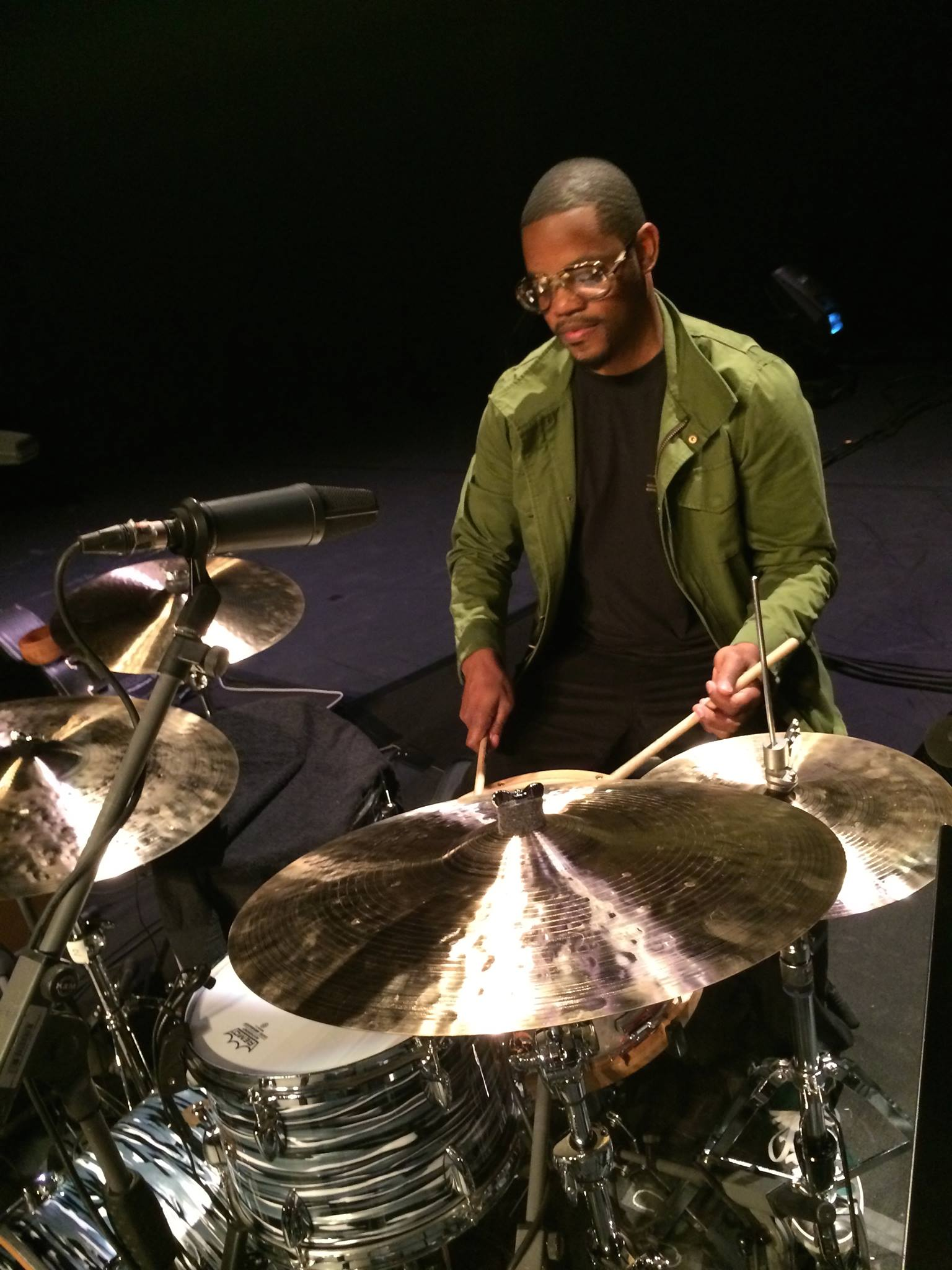
- Riggins in 2014

Background information
- Born: August 25, 1975 (age 50)
- Origin: Detroit, Michigan, U.S.
- Genres: Jazz; hip hop
- Occupations: Record producer; disc jockey; songwriter
- Instruments: Drums; percussion
- Years active: 1990s–present
- Label: Stones Throw
- Member of: August Greene; Jahari Massamba Unit
- Website: karriemriggins.com

Karriem Riggins (born August 25, 1975) is an American jazz drummer, record producer, DJ and songwriter from Detroit, Michigan. He met Chicago rapper Common and fellow Detroit musician J Dilla both in 1996, and served as an extensive contributor for releases by both artists. He produced for Common's 1997 album One Day It'll All Make Sense, did so on much of his further projects, and formed the musical trio August Greene with the rapper alongside fellow jazz instrumentalist Robert Glasper in 2018. Furthermore, he formed the Jahari Massamba Unit with Madlib in 2020, and has also worked with prominent music industry artists including Paul McCartney, Kanye West, Denzel Curry, Earl Sweatshirt, and Norah Jones, among others.

== Biography ==
Riggins was born in Detroit, Michigan, son of keyboardist Emmanuel Riggins. As a child, he often watched his father perform with acts including Grant Green and Marcus Belgrave. He joined the Kennedy Elementary school band in the sixth grade as a trumpeter, studying with Belgrave, where he played for two years in addition to drums before switching to drums full-time in the eighth grade.

Riggins was a DJ, producing hip-hop and performing in three different school bands at Southfield High School before leaving school in the eleventh grade. He joined Betty Carter's Jazz Ahead band soon after at age 17 and moved to New York in 1994, later joining the Mulgrew Miller trio. He also performed in bands with Steven Scott and Benny Green before joining Roy Hargrove's band in the middle of 1995.

After three years with Hargrove, Riggins joined the trio of famed bassist Ray Brown. After leaving Brown's band, he began producing hip-hop extensively and serving as the bandleader for rapper Common's band, A Black Girl Named Becky. Riggins had met Common in 1996, and began spending time with the rapper during visits with notable hip-hop producers. He also met J Dilla, a fellow Detroit native, that same year. He then formed a close friendship with Dilla until his death; Riggins has cited Dilla as a primary influence in helping him overcome multiple creative ruts throughout his career. He credits Dilla for purchasing the first production he ever sold, for "The Clapper" on Welcome 2 Detroit (2001), followed by two songs on his album, The Shining (2006).

Apart from working with Common and Dilla, Riggins has produced for other hip hop artists like Slum Village, Erykah Badu, The Roots, Kanye West, Talib Kweli, Kaytranada, Earl Sweatshirt, Phat Kat, Consequence and Dwele. He also collaborated with multi-instrumentalist Madlib on his 2007 album Yesterdays Universe, they formed the musical outfits Supreme Team and The Jahari Massamba Unit.

As a drummer, Riggins has recorded or performed with Donald Byrd, Hank Jones, Milt Jackson, Oscar Peterson, Norah Jones, Cedar Walton, Roy Hargrove, Esperanza Spalding and Bobby Hutcherson. In 2011, he collaborated with Paul McCartney of the Beatles in concert and on his album Kisses on the Bottom—McCartney's first studio release in five years.

Riggins released his debut full-length album, the instrumental double-LP Alone Together on Stones Throw Records on October 23, 2012. Prior to its release, Stones Throw released the two halves of the album separately on vinyl as well as digitally exclusively through their website. Alone was released on July 30 and Together followed on October 2. He extensively worked on Common's highly acclaimed 2016 album Black America Again, which featured Stevie Wonder on the titular song and included a performance at the White House as part of NPR's "Tiny Desk Concerts" series. On February 24, 2017, Riggins released his second album on Stones Throw, Headnod Suite.

Along with Common and Robert Glasper, Riggins received the award for Outstanding Original Music & Lyrics at the 69th Primetime Creative Arts Emmy Awards for Common's song "Letter to the Free," which appeared in Ava DuVernay's Netflix documentary "13th".

In 2026 he formed the duo Gena with the vocalist Liv.e and produced the album The Pleasure Is Yours on Lex.

== Personal life ==
As of 2007, he resides in Los Angeles, California.

== Discography ==
=== Albums ===
- Alone Together (2012)
- Headnod Suite (2017)
- Pardon My French (2020) as Jahari Massamba Unit with Madlib
- To the Jungle (2024)
- YHWH Is Love (2024) as Jahari Massamba Unit with Madlib
- The Pleasure Is Yours (2026) as Gena with Liv.e

=== Production credits ===
with Common

- 1997: "Pop's Rap, Pt. 2 / Fatherhood" on One Day It'll All Make Sense
- 2000: "Pops Rap III... All My Children" (featuring Lonnie "Pops" Lynn) on Like Water for Chocolate
- 2002: "The Hustle" (featuring Omar and Dart Chillz) on Electric Circus
- 2003: "Come Close Remix (Closer)"
- 2005: "It's Your World (Part 1 & 2)" on Be, co-produced with J Dilla and James Poyser
- 2007: "Play Your Cards Right" (featuring Bilal), iTunes bonus track for Finding Forever
- 2016: Black America Again, main producer, in part co-produced with Robert Glasper, also executive producer

with J Dilla

- 2001: "The Clapper" on Welcome 2 Detroit, co-producer
- 2002: "Drive Me Wild" on The Diary
- 2006: "Over the Breaks" and "Body Movin'" (featuring J. Rocc) on The Shining, co-producer

with others

- 2001: Daft Punk – "Aerodynamic (Remix)"
- 2002: Phat Kat – "VIP In" (on Slum Village mix Dirty District)
- 2002: Slum Village – "Tainted" (featuring Dwele), "S.O.U.L." and "Harmony" on Trinity (Past, Present and Future), co-producer
- 2002: The Roots – "Quills" on Phrenology
- 2003: Dwele – Subject
- 2004: Phat Kat – "VIP In" and "Club Banger" on The Undeniable LP
- 2005: Slum Village – "We Be Dem (Part II)" and "Do Our Thing" (featuring The Dramatics) on Prequel to a Classic
- 2007: Consequence – "Uncle Rahiem" on Don't Quit Your Day Job!, co-wrote "Yo Dex! (Skit)"
- 2008: Keziah Jones – Nigerian Wood
- 2008: Erykah Badu – "Soldier" on New Amerykah Part One (4th World War)
- 2010: Erykah Badu – "Fall in Love (Your Funeral)" on New Amerykah Part Two (Return of the Ankh), drums on "Turn Me Away (Get MuNNY)"
- 2010: M.E.D. – "Classic" (featuring Talib Kweli)
- 2012: Madlib – Medicine Show: The Brick
- 2016: Kanye West – "30 Hours" on The Life of Pablo, co-producer
- 2016: Kaytranada – "Bus Ride" on 99.9%
- 2016: Elzhi – "Two 16's" on Lead Poison
- 2017: Nick Grant – "Gotta Be More" on Return of the Cool
- 2022: Denzel Curry – "Angelz" on Melt My Eyez See Your Future

=== As drummer ===
- 1994: Stephen Scott – Renaissance
- 1995: Mulgrew Miller – Getting to Know You
- 1996: Rodney Whitaker – Children of the Light
- 1996: Eric Reed – Musicale
- 1998: Rodney Whitaker – Hidden Kingdom
- 1999: Junko Onishi – Fragile
- 1999: Oscar Peterson, Ray Brown and Milt Jackson – The Very Tall Band, Live at the Blue Note
- 2000: Ray Brown Trio – Some of My Best Friends Are... The Trumpet Players
- 2002: Mulgrew Miller – The Sequel
- 2003: Ray Brown Trio – Walk On
- 2003: Mulgrew Miller – Live at Yoshi's, Vol. 1, and Vol. 2
- 2003: The Detroit Experiment – The Detroit Experiment, also produced three tracks
- 2009: Diana Krall – Quiet Nights – Live in Madrid
- 2010: Miguel Atwood-Ferguson – Timeless: Suite for Ma Dukes
- 2012: Paul McCartney – Kisses on the Bottom
- 2014: Theo Croker – Afro Physicist
- 2015: Orrin Evans – The Evolution of Oneself
- 2015: Diana Krall – Wallflower
- 2016: Esperanza Spalding – Emily's D+Evolution
- 2016: Norah Jones – Day Breaks
- 2018: Kandace Springs – Indigo, also producer
- 2020: Diana Krall – This Dream of You

== Awards and honors ==
- Primetime Emmy Award for Outstanding Original Music and Lyrics, Common, Robert Glasper and Karriem Riggins for "Letter to the Free" from the documentary film 13th, 2017
