= YHWH Is Love =

Studio album by Jahari Massamba Unit
- Released: March 1, 2024
- Genre: Jazz-funk; jazz fusion; underground hip-hop
- Length: 47:16
- Language: English
- Label: Law of Rhythm
- Producer: Madlib; Karriem Riggins

Jahari Massamba Unit chronology
Pardon My French (2020)	YHWH Is Love (2024)

Singles from YHWH Is Love
- 1. "Stomping Gamay" Released: December 14, 2023; 2. "Massamba Afundance" Released: January 18, 2024; 3. "Otis' Tambourine" Released: February 22, 2024

“I feel like music is healing. You know, and with God the most important thing is having high vibration. People need to be uplifted these days. I know I do. And creating this music is definitely uplifting. So I just feel like Yahweh brings existence with whatever exists. So with that creation of the music, it’s just definitely channeling the Supreme Being.”

—Karriem Riggins on the inspiration for YHWH Is Love

YHWH Is Love is a 2024 studio album by Jahari Massamba Unit, a collective name for American hip-hop musician Madlib and American jazz drummer Karriem Riggins. It received positive reviews from critics.

== Release ==
The duo announced the album and released its debut single, "Stomping Gamay", on December 14, 2023. "Massamba Afundance", the album's second single, was released on January 18, 2024. The album's third and final single, "Otis' Tambourine", was released on February 22, 2024.

== Reception ==
Professional ratings
Review scores
Source	Rating
AllMusic	4/5 stars
The Line of Best Fit	7/10

Editors at AllMusic rated the album 4 out of 5 stars, with critic Thom Jurek writing that the music combines diverse genres, such as funk and EDM, making a "set [that] offers slippery, hypnotic grooves in a humid mix perfect for late-night gatherings or cruising the boulevard". Bandcamp Daily published a feature on the album where Blake Gillespie called the music "chameleonic jazz" and drew connections with artists such as "the Mizell Brothers’ work with Donald Byrd, Johnny Hammond, and Bobbi Humphrey. Ryan Dillon of Glide Magazine, characterized the work as "an avalanche of juxtaposing melodies cascade down neck-breaking drums, one element bleeding into the next for seamless hip-hop-flavored jazz" and "a clinic on tone". Writing for The Line of Best Fit, Janne Oinonen rated this album a 7 out of 10, stating that "the overall impression of the effortlessly laidback YHWH is Love is a more groove-orientated and horizontally organic take on Sound Ancestors, Madlib’s 2021 solo album" and "a winningly diverse and consistently charming offering" release that is "probably too laidback to be truly essential and occasionally prone to idling in wait for the next idea to strike, but certainly worthy of closer inspection". A review of the best albums of the year by Craig Jenkins of Vulture included YHWH Is Love, which he called "a genre-hopping mind-meld uniting a pair of storied indie-rap figureheads" that is "brimming with playful, mournful, wily, and beguiling compositions".

== Track listing ==
All songs written by Otis Jackson and Karriem Riggins.

1. "Rubato Love" – 1:56
2. "Stomping Gamay" – 4:53
3. "Otis' Tambourine" – 4:29
4. "All Things..." – 3:43
5. "Anointed Soul" – 3:09
6. "Karriem's Bolero" – 4:38
7. "JMU’s Voyage" – 0:31
8. "Six 8ight (Interlude)" – 4:25
9. "The Clappers Cousin" – 3:24
10. "Massamba Afundance" – 3:02
11. "e11even (Interlude)" – 1:00
12. "With YHWH Love." – 5:01
13. "Boppin'" – 3:39
14. "Seven Mile to Oxnard" – 3:26

== Personnel ==
Jahari Massamba Unit

- Madlib – rapping, instrumentation, recording, production
- Karriem Riggins – drums, recording, production, executive production

Additional personnel

- Jae Barber – executive production
- Dave Cooley – audio mastering
- Jason Jägel – album artwork
- Elijah Meisse – product management

== See also ==
- 2024 in American music
- 2024 in hip-hop
- 2024 in jazz
- List of 2024 albums
