= Who Waters the Wilting Giving Tree Once the Leaves Dry Up and Fruits No Longer Bear? =

Studio album by $ilkMoney
- Released: July 18, 2025
- Labels: DB$B; Lex

$ilkMoney chronology
I Don't Give a Fuck About This Rap Shit, Imma Just Drop Until I Don't Feel Like It Anymore (2022)	Who Waters the Wilting Giving Tree Once the Leaves Dry Up and Fruits No Longer Bear? (2025)

Singles from Who Waters the Wilting Giving Tree Once the Leaves Dry Up and Fruits No Longer Bear?
- 1. "Never Trust a Bitch Tha– *Explodes*" Released: May 28, 2025

Who Waters the Wilting Giving Tree Once the Leaves Dry Up and Fruits No Longer Bear? is the fifth studio album by American musician $ilkMoney. It was released digitally on July 18, 2025, via DB$B Records and Lex Records.

== Background ==
Noted as concept album taking inspiration from the Giving Tree, a children's book by Shel Silverstein, the album succeeds $ilkMoney's 2022 full-length release, I Don't Give a Fuck About This Rap Shit, Imma Just Drop Until I Don't Feel Like It Anymore. "Never Trust a Bitch Tha– *Explodes*" was released as a single on May 28, 2025, alongside a music video directed by Micaiah Carter.

== Reception ==
Professional ratings
Aggregate scores
Source	Rating
Metacritic	87/100
Review scores
Source	Rating
AllMusic	4.5/5 stars
Pitchfork	8.0/10
Slant	4/5 stars
Spectrum Culture	79%

Describing the album as "audacious" and "self-reflective", Damien Holsters of the Quietus remarked, "while it might seem straightforward to use The Giving Tree as the central metaphor for an album where you give so much of yourself, it should be said that exploring all the ramifications of that metaphor would be anything but."

The album received a 8.0 rating from Pitchfork, whose reviewer Dash Lewis noted, "The album takes a while to unpack; its song titles are riddles posed by an especially online bridge troll, and each cryptic verse seems to twist through a hundred different ideas."

In a four-star review for Slant, Steve Erickson opined, "As much as Who Waters the Giving Wilting Tree relies on attitude, it never feels one-note or settles for mere edginess," describing $ilkMoney's flow as "rapid" and stating it "mingles anger and excitement."

Kyle Cochrun of Spectrum Culture assigned the project a score of 79%, referring to it as "a compelling work, packed with confidence, humor, anger, violence, pop-culture references and the emotional clutter of human consciousness."

Fred Thomas, writing in AllMusic, stated "Who Waters the Wilting Giving Tree... is a nonstop flow of stunning ideas and performances, without ever getting so heady that the fun and strangeness become alienating."

== Track listing ==
No.	Title	Length
1.	"Pneumonoultramicroscopic(nobody)silicovolcanoboniosis"	3:03
2.	"Well I'll Be a Monkey's Uncle"	2:30
3.	"Ooops, Honey I Shrunk Myself With the Honey I Shrunk the Kids Ray Machine and Crawled into Your Dickhole by Accident"	1:58
4.	"A Whale Is Only as Blue as You It Is, So, Its 2"	2:55
5.	"We Snuck the Biscuit in the Tunnel and Din Een Need To"	2:59
6.	"Prolly Wouldn't Be Here If We Woulda Been Killed That Nigga King Bach"	2:46
7.	"Bigfatjellydachilidaaawg Luvahluvah"	3:39
8.	"First I Give Up, Then I Give In, Then I Give All"	3:32
9.	"I've Been Doing This Thing All Wrong the Whole Time, That's Crazy, Holup"	1:29
10.	"Fuuuuuck, Baby. You're Just So Sexy When You're Terrified"	2:27
11.	"There Are Hills and Mountains Between Us, Always Something to Get Over"	3:23
12.	"The $400 Cheeseburger from the Window Shopper Video Was Just a Big Mac"	3:19
13.	"The Jury Duty Seafood Boilbag from the Lyfe Jennings Paperwork Party"	3:06
14.	"Never Trust a Bitch Tha– *Explodes*"	3:12
15.	"The Unnerving Presence of the Black Hand"	4:26
Total length:		44:44

== Accolades ==
Publication	Accolade	Year	Rank
AllMusic	Favorite Rap & Hip-Hop Albums	2025	—
Complex	The 50 Best Albums of 2025	2025	48
Glide	Best Hip-Hop Albums of 2025	2025	—
