= Girl in the Half Pearl =

Studio album by Liv.e
- Released: February 10, 2023
- Recorded: October 2021 to 2022
- Genres: Alternative R&B; neo-soul; psychedelic soul
- Length: 40:47
- Language: English
- Label: In Real Life
- Producers: John Carroll Kirby; Aaron Liao; Justin Raisen; Liv.e; Mndsgn; Solomonophonic

Liv.e chronology
| CWTTY+ (2021) | Girl in the Half Pearl (2023) | Past Futur.e (2024) |

Singles from Girl in the Half Pearl
- 1. "Ghost" Released: October 14, 2022; 2. "Wild Animals" Released: November 17, 2022; 3. "Find Out" Released: January 13, 2023

Girl in the Half Pearl is the second full-length studio album by American alternative R&B and neo-soul singer Liv.e, released on February 10, 2023, by In Real Life. The follow-up to her critically-acclaimed debut album Couldn't Wait to Tell You (2020) and its companion EP, CWTTY+ (2021), it was preceded by the singles "Ghost", "Wild Animals", and "Find Out".

Girl in the Half Pearl features production from Liv.e herself as well as John Carroll Kirby, Mndsgn, Justin Raisen, Aaron Liao and Solomonophonic. Lyrically, the record is informed by the end of Liv.e's relationship with her former partner, and features themes including love, womanhood, and self-determination. The album received universal critical acclaim upon release and was named on several 'best-of' lists for 2023.

== Background and recording ==
In 2021, Liv.e's relationship with her then-partner, which she had been in for 'most of her adult life', was falling apart. After touring with rapper Mike in the hope that it would alleviate the issues - a decision which Liv.e has stated 'did not help' - and also completing a residency at London venue Laylow, the relationship ended in summer 2022. Liv.e has described the relationship and its fallout as leaving her in a state of 'cognitive dissonance' and 'big delusion', resulting in her 'avoiding friends, avoiding myself, avoiding spending time alone' and using cannabis and alcohol to cope. This experience would ultimately inform the narrative of Girl in the Half Pearl.

Liv.e wrote Girl in the Half Pearl over the course of a year, beginning work in October 2021, prior to her breakup. She has described the writing process as 'exorcizing' the emotions she felt at the time, and termed the album 'the most wide-open [she has] been' on a record. Her influences on the record include the artists Sonic Youth, The Slits and Prince, video games Jet Set Radio Future and the Sonic the Hedgehog series, television shows The Powerpuff Girls and Cowboy Bebop, and television programming block Toonami.

The album was preceded by three singles, "Ghost", "Wild Animals", and "Find Out". A music video for "Wild Animals", directed by Liv.e, was released alongside the single.

The album's title is taken from the image of Liv.e standing in a snow globe (a ‘half pearl’) which has been shaken up, representing the fact that, despite being shaken, everything around her will eventually settle. Despite the title resembling that of Johannes Vermeer's painting Girl with a Pearl Earring, Liv.e has denied any connection between the two works.

== Reception ==
Professional ratings
Aggregate scores
| Source | Rating |
|---|---|
| AnyDecentMusic? | 7.4/10 |
| Metacritic | 85/100 |
Review scores
| Source | Rating |
| AllMusic | 4/5 stars |
| HipHopDX | 4.5/5 stars |
| Loud and Quiet | 7/10 |
| Pitchfork | 8.3/10 |
| Under the Radar | 8/10 |

Girl in the Half Pearl received universal acclaim from music critics. At Metacritic, which assigns a normalized rating out of 100 to reviews from professional publications, the album received an average score of 85, based on 7 reviews. Aggregator AnyDecentMusic? gave Girl in the Half Pearl 7.4 out of 10, based on their assessment of the critical consensus.

Editors at AllMusic rated the album 4 out of 5 stars, with critic Paul Simpson writing that it is "both more introspective and more expansive than [Liv.e]'s previous work, drawing from a wider range of stylistic influences and containing lyrics that are more upfront about the artist's desires and conflicts". Editors at Bandcamp selected Girl in the Half Pearl as Album of the Day, with Mercy Kassa characterizing it as "a psychedelic collection of jazz-infused, soulful tracks that tackle themes of Black womanhood, self-determination, and liberation, giving listeners a front row experience to the struggle to find personal and creative freedom". HipHopDX's Lauren Floyd awarded the album a 4.5 out of 5, calling it a "beautiful expression of self" that "thematically weaves the concepts of womanhood and honest expression in a world that prioritizes neat, clean and easily understood motifs". For Loud and Quiet, Tom Critten gave Girl in the Half Pearl 7 out of 10, citing the "effortlessness" of Liv.e's songwriting. NPR's Teresa Xie summed up her review by stating that "Liv.e's meditative concoction of sounds, which pull from many genres but can never be attributed to one in particular, like many great mixes, reveal the ways that growth and disorientation oscillate between each other like a pendulum".

Phillipe Roberts of Pitchfork, referring to the diary-like nature of Liv.e's previous record Couldn't Wait to Tell You, wrote that Girl in the Half Pearl "cuts to the scene after the diary slams shut, when your face crashes into the pillow before a long and sleepless night". Editors at Pitchfork awarded Girl in the Half Pearl the title of Best New Music and shortlisted it one of the best albums of February 2023, with critic Mark Hogan proposing the album as a contender for Grammy Award for Best Progressive R&B Album. Writing for The Quietus, Arusa Qureshi described it as "an album that is hard to categorise but its methodical beats, otherworldly production, intriguingly chaotic clashes of melody and hazy vocals all inexplicably mesh together, with Liv.e leaning further and further towards that vital point of breakthrough".

In a profile for Rolling Stone, Matthew Ritchie wrote that the album "captures the feeling of your world breaking down, then trying to sort through the rubble to rebuild a new reality" and that the diverse music is comparable to Erykah Badu. Spin's Julian Towers wrote that this album is "more jagged and sharp-edged in its sonic architecture" than Liv.e's 2020 effort Couldn't Wait to Tell You. Writing for Stereogum Yousef Srour called it "more direct" than Liv.e's last full-length. Michelle Dalarossa of Under the Radar rated this release an 8 out of 10, summing up "to contain this many sounds and probe this many emotional episodes—from the breathlessness of blooming love to the deception of a failed relationship, the insecurity of missing someone to the confidence of letting go—is no easy feat, but one of Liv.e's greatest strengths lies in her fluidity and bold instincts". Craig Jenkins of Vulture stated that the "album's confident mind-set and musicality are defenses against the unpleasantness of the decade, during which patriarchal power structures persist in spite of a universal outcry and a casual rudeness has infected countless facets of public life".

=== Rankings ===
Girl in the Half Pearl was included on several "album of the year" lists. It was highlighted by Billboard in an unranked list, with Andrew Unterberger calling it a "float down the winding path of Lake Psilocybin, where beats, lyrics, instruments and ideas flit in and out seemingly on their own whims, intriguing, tantalizing and frustrating before making way for the next turn". The staff of Okayplayer published individual picks for the year on July 12, with two editors choosing Liv.e's album for their top five. Another unranked list from Rolling Stone featured Jon Dolan's assessment that Liv.e "uses her wide-open inner space to map out messy romantic states and multileveled internal crisis, luxuriating in a self-discovery that seems to be eternally unfolding". Slant Magazine's unranked listing has Thomas Bedenbaugh noting the album's unique blend of genres, continuing that "eclectic influences alone don't make an album worthwhile, and Williams fills hers with gorgeous, occasionally haunting melodies that are as infectious as they are ephemeral". Editors of Stereogum ranked the album the 41st best album of 2023's first half, with critic Chris DeVille writing that the album "get[s] weirder, wilder, and more impassioned as Liv.e grafts R&B to IDM with a singular, emphatic touch". In a mid-year review, Rolling Stone India included the album in their best albums of 2023.

Girl in the Half Pearl in best-of lists
| Outlet | Listing | Rank |
|---|---|---|
| AllMusic | AllMusic Best of 2023 | —N/a |
| AllMusic | Favorite R&B Albums | —N/a |
| Bandcamp | The Best Albums of 2023 | —N/a |
| Clash Music | Albums of the Year 2023 | 31 |
| Pitchfork | The 50 Best Albums of 2023 | 39 |
| Pitchfork | The Best Pop Music of 2023 | —N/a |
| Slant Magazine | The 50 Best Albums of 2023 | 50 |
| Stereogum | The 50 Best Albums of 2023 | 38 |
| World Cafe | John Morrison's Favorite Albums of 2023 | —N/a |

== Track listing ==
All tracks are written by Hailee Olivia Williams.

| No. | Title | Producer | Length |
|---|---|---|---|
| 1. | "Gardetto" | Liv.e | 2:55 |
| 2. | "A Slumber Party‽" | Liv.e | 1:53 |
| 3. | "Lake Psilocybin" | Mndsgn | 3:00 |
| 4. | "Six Weeks" | Justin Raisen | 1:19 |
| 5. | "Ghost" | Liv.e | 2:36 |
| 6. | "Find Out" | Mndsgn | 2:28 |
| 7. | "Clowns" | Liv.e; Aaron Liao | 2:36 |
| 8. | "Heart Break Escape" | Liv.e; Aaron Liao | 2:20 |
| 9. | "HowTheyLikeMe!" | Liv.e | 1:44 |
| 10. | "Snowing!" | Liv.e | 3:31 |
| 11. | "Wild Animals" | Liv.e; Solomonophonic; John Carroll Kirby | 3:35 |
| 12. | "RESET!" | Mndsgn | 2:24 |
| 13. | "Underground" | Liv.e | 2:04 |
| 14. | "Back Alley" | Mndsgn | 0:53 |
| 15. | "Our Father" | Liv.e | 2:44 |
| 16. | "NoNewNews!!!" | Liv.e | 1:58 |
| 17. | "Glass Shadows" | Mndsgn | 2:36 |
| Total length: | | | 40:47 |

== Personnel ==
- Liv.e – vocals, production
- Mikealin 'Blue' Bluespruce – mixing
- John Carroll Kirby – production
- Joe LaPorta – mastering at Sterling Sound, Edgewater, New Jersey, United States
- Aaron Liao – production
- Justin Raisen – production
- Mndsgn – production
- qlick – artwork
- Solomonophonic – production

== See also ==
- 2023 in American music
- List of 2023 albums
