= DJ Harrison =

American musician and producer

- Born: Devonne Andre Harris; Richmond, Virginia, U.S.
- Genres: Electronic; hip hop; jazz; funk
- Occupations: Multi-instrumentalist; singer; songwriter; producer
- Instruments: Drums; guitar; violin; piano; keys; bass
- Years active: 2009–present
- Labels: Stones Throw; Jellowstone Records
- Member of: Butcher Brown

Devonne Andre Harris, more commonly known by his stage name DJ Harrison, is an American multi-instrumentalist, singer, songwriter and producer from Richmond, Virginia.

== Early life ==
The son of a radio deejay, Harris was born in Petersburg and grew up in Chesterfield County. Harris was interested in music at a young age. After playing with a kids drum set for years, his mother got him a professional drum set when he was seven, then a keyboard, and finally a bass when he was twelve. Harris lived in a house full of records as both his parents were music lovers. He developed a fascination with the way vinyl records were made from immersing himself in his parents' collection.

He joined the Thomas Dale High School marching band before graduating from Virginia Commonwealth University's jazz studies program where he picked up a scientific approach to songwriting by building his songs methodically through researching and experimenting with new sounds.

== Career ==
Harris founded the Jellowstone music production studio and co-founded the record label of the same name with No BS! Brass Band leader Reggie Pace. The studio has birthed countless projects by local artists in Virginia — including Harris and his bandmates in Butcher Brown.

== Discography ==
=== Studio albums ===
- Monotones (2013)
- POLYTONED: DJ Harrison and Friends (2013)
- PALM TREES (2013)
- Stashboxxx (2014)
- Songs About H.E.R. (2016)
- Slyish (2016)
- HazyMoods (2017)
- Everlasting (2020)
- Tales from the Old Dominion (2021)
- Shades of Yesterday (2024)
- ElectricSoul (2026)

=== EPs ===
- Everlasting (2020)
- L’Anthropofemme (2024)

=== Singles ===
- "Ties Are Aesthetic (DJ Harrison Remix)" (2019)
- "Happy" (2020)
- "Things I Should Have Said" (2020)
- "Can't Believe You Love Me" (2020)
- "Love's in Need of Love Today" (2021)
- "The Message Continues (DJ Harrison Remix)" (2021)
- "Be Better" (2021)
- "City Lights" (2021)
- "Cosmos" (2021) (with Pink Siifu)
- "IGY" (2023)
- "L'Anthropofemme" (2024)
- "NeverFold" (2025)
- "Stay Ready" (2025) (with Yaya Bey)
