= Silkmoney =

American rapper

$ilkMoney
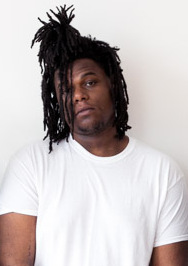
- $ilkMoney in 2016

Background information
- Born: 1996 or 1997 (age 29–30); Richmond, Virginia, U.S.
- Genres: Trap; conscious hip-hop; jazz rap; cloud rap; hardcore hip-hop; abstract hip-hop
- Occupation: Rapper
- Years active: 2014–present
- Labels: DB$B; Lex Records
- Formerly of: Divine Council

Silkmoney (Note: stylized as $ilkMoney.) (born 1996 or 1997) is an American rapper from Richmond, Virginia. He was a member of Divine Council before their 2017 breakup. Since then, he collaborated with Tyler, the Creator and Andre 3000, and had success on streaming services in 2021 with the single "My Potna Dem".

== Discography ==
=== With Divine Council ===
- Council World (2016)
- DBSB (2017)

=== Solo albums ===
- I Hate My Life and I Really Wish People Would Stop Telling Me Not To (2018)
- G.T.F.O.M.D: There’s Not Enough Room for All You Motha Fuckas to Be on It Like This (2019)
- Attack of the Future Shocked, Flesh Covered, Meatbags of the 85 (2020)
- I Don't Give A Fuck About This Rap Shit, Imma Just Drop Until I Don't Feel Like It Anymore (2022)
- Who Waters the Wilting Giving Tree Once the Leaves Dry Up and Fruits No Longer Bear? (2025)
