= Butcher Brown =

American jazz quintet

- Origin: Richmond, Virginia, United States
- Genres: jazz; jazz fusion; soul
- Years active: 2009–present
- Label: Concord Jazz
- Members: Marcus Tenney; Morgan Burrs; Corey Fonville; Andrew Randazzo; DJ Harrison
- Past members: Keith Askey
- Website: butcherbrown.com

Butcher Brown is a jazz quintet founded in 2009 and based in Richmond, Virginia. Their members are Marcus Tenney (trumpet and saxophone), Morgan Burrs (guitar), Corey Fonville (percussion), Andrew Randazzo (bass), and DJ Harrison (keyboards).

DownBeat has characterized them as a "'70s jazz-funk fusion throwback". Others describe their music as a mix of jazz, hip-hop, soul, funk, and R&B. National Public Radio says that "they scoff at the limitations of adjacent genres with the expertise of master musicians who've played together so long that they flow from one vibe to the next without missing a beat."

Burrs and Fonville, speaking about the band's sound and development, have cited the following as inspirations: D'Angelo, the Headhunters, the Miles Davis Second Quintet, Return to Forever, the Robert Glasper Experiment, the Roots, Spyro Gyra, and Weather Report.

Butcher Brown's cover of Little Richard's "Rip It Up" was selected as the theme song of Monday Night Football in September 2020.

In 2024, the band won the third annual Newlin Music Prize for their album Solar Music.

In 2025, Butcher Brown released Letters from the Atlantic, featuring female guest artists Yaya Bey, Melanie Charles, Leanor Wolf, Mia Gladstone, Victoria Victoria, along with Nicholas Payton and Neal Francis.

== Discography ==
They have released ten albums.

Title	Label	Year
Backtracks	(self-released)	2013
All Purpose Music	Jellowstone Records	2014
Grown Folk	Thrash Flow	2015
Live at Vagabond	Gearbox Records	2017
The Healer	(self-released)	2017
Camden Session	Gearbox Records	2018
AfroKuti: A Tribute To Fela	(self-released)	2018
#KingButch	Concord Jazz	2020
Encore	Concord Jazz	2020
Butcher Brown Presents Triple Trey	Concord Jazz	2022
Solar Music	Concord Jazz	2023
Letters from the Atlantic	Concord Jazz	2025
