= Pink Siifu =

American rapper, singer, and songwriter

- Also known as: iiye; Liv Martez
- Born: Livingston Lemorie Matthews; January 27, 1992 (age 34); Birmingham, Alabama, U.S.
- Genres: Southern hip hop; alternative hip hop; neo-soul; punk rap; industrial hip hop
- Occupations: Rapper; singer; songwriter
- Years active: 2013–present
- Label: Dynamite Hill
- Website: pinksiifu.com

Livingston Lemorie Matthews, known professionally as Pink Siifu, and occasionally iiye, is an American rapper, singer and songwriter from Cincinnati, Ohio, and Birmingham, Alabama.

== Life and career ==
Matthews acquired an appreciation for music from his family, while dividing his time between Birmingham and Cincinnati in his youth. His father, a saxophone player, introduced him to classic jazz, while his mother and older brother introduced him to R&B and hip-hop. Matthews played the trumpet and drums in marching bands throughout his youth. After high school, he became a theater major at Wright State University in Fairborn, Ohio, a suburb of Dayton. However, he chose to leave the university to focus on a rap career. He started performing in Cincinnati under the name 'Liv Martez' before moving to Los Angeles in 2013 after recording in studios there, including working on a project with Syd tha Kyd.

He began releasing music under the name Pink Siifu in 2014, while also producing under the name iiye. Matthews released several projects between 2014 and 2018.

In 2018, Matthews released Ensley under the Pink Siifu moniker to critical acclaim. He named the LP after Ensley, Alabama, a suburb of Birmingham where his grandmother lived. Ensley received a placement on Pitchfork's best rap albums of 2018 list. His next release was the album NEGRO. Initially titled To Be Angry, the album has been described as a "shrill and abrasive" blend of jazz, punk rock, and rap. Siifu's 2021 solo album, Gumbo'!, featured his studio album debut alongside artists Georgia Anne Muldrow and Nick Hakim. It also featured production by Monte Booker, The Alchemist, and others. In 2021, Matthews directed a short film titled "NATION TYME!", an experimental film centered on an excerpt from famed writer Amiri Baraka's essay "It's Nation Time".

== Style and influences ==
Pink Siifu has been described as having a slow and lackadaisical delivery to his vocals, a quality he attributes to the influence of Mos Def, Lil Wayne, and Outkast. Siifu's music has generally been described as alternative hip-hop and neo-soul, but he has experimented with other genres, including punk on his 2020 release, NEGRO. Outside of hip-hop, Matthews has listed George Clinton, Bad Brains, Alice Coltrane, Sun Ra, Pixies, Radiohead, and Death Grips among his influences.

== Discography ==
=== Albums ===
- VCR@aol.jazz: A decade's letter to the Galaxy (as VCR@aol.jazz) (2014)
- Zin (as iiye) (2014)
- Zen (as iiye) (2014)
- No/more LOVE (as iiye) (2014)
- UaReL. (2015)
- Space Ghetto (2016)
- Ensley (2018)
- NEGRO (2020)
- Gumbo'! (2021)
- BLACK'!ANTIQUE (2025)
- ONYX'! (2025)

=== Collaborative albums ===
- Twothousandnine (with Swarvy) (2016)
- BRWN (with Ahwlee as B. Cool-Aid) (2017)
- KRYPTONYTE (with Liv.e and Lord Byron as Kryptonyte) (2018)
- Syrup (with Ahwlee as B. Cool-Aid) (2019)
- Black Sand (with AKAI SOLO) (2019)
- Bag Talk (with YungMorpheus) (2020)
- FlySiifu's (with Fly Anakin) (2020)
- $mokebreak (with Fly Anakin) (2021)
- Real Bad Flights (with Real Bad Man) (2022)
- Leather Blvd (with Ahwlee as B. Cool-Aid) (2023)
- It's Too Quiet..'! (with Turich Benjy) (2023)

=== Extended plays ===
- A maze btw time (as iiye) (2014)
- Year 19803711967 (as iiye) (2014)
- Allway[v]ez (as iiye) (2015)
- Reggie, Ernest, Wester, Rusty (as iiye) (2015)
- A second definatelycaughtin between love x fear (as iiye) (2015)
- Bround/brown (as iiye) (2016)
- Giiift Wrap:VoL.1 (as iiye) (2016)
- Black food 1 (as iiye) (2016)
- Old'focus (as iiye) (2016)
- Tape (as iiye) (2016)
- In between. (as iiye) (2016)
- A'lady. 1 (as iiye) (2016)
- Let go (2016)
- In between. (as iiye) (2016)
- Black food 2 (as iiye) (2017)
- Lil'likeluv.1 (as iiye) (2017)
- Grden.1 (as iiye) (2017)
- A'lady. 2 (as iiye) (2017)
- black food 3 (as iiye) (2017)
- Lil'likeluv.2 (as iiye) (2017)
- Drnk (as iiye) (2017)
- Head (2017)
- Slwdwn Vol. 1 (as iiye) (2017)
- Lil'likeluv.3 (as iiye) (2018)
- Uptwn.1 (as iiye) (2018)
- Slwdwn Vol. 2 (as iiye) (2018)
- Southern. (as iiye) (2018)
- A'lady. 3 (as iiye) (2018)
- Uptwn.2 (as iiye) (2018)
- Dollaz.1 (as iiye) (2018)
- Im still. (2018)
- Black food 4 (as iiye) (2019)
- Uptwn.3 (as iiye) (2018)
- Use. (as iiye) (2019)
- Slwdwn Vol. 3 (as iiye) (2019)
- Dollaz.2 (as iiye) (2020)
- Grden.3 (as iiye) (2020)
- Lil'SidePeace. (as iiye) (2020)
- Lil'likeluv.4 (as iiye) (2020)
- Dollaz.3 (as iiye) (2020)
- Uptwn.4 (as iiye) (2021)

=== Singles ===
- "Blvck Space Pink vol.1" (as iiye) (2015)
- "Heart on my face" (2017)
- "Halos/Bills" (released in collaboration with Swarvy) (2017)
- "Cocoa" (released in collaboration with B. Cool-Aid and Awhlee) (2018)
- "Cement" (released in collaboration with Shungu) (2020)
- "Dollar Dr. Dream" (released in collaboration with Fly Anakin) (2020)
- "Richard Pryor" (released in collaboration with Fly Anakin) (2020)
- "Mind Right" featuring Liv.e (released in collaboration with Fly Anakin) (2020)
- "Blame" (released in collaboration with Fly Anakin) (2021)
- "Minnie Lives" (released in collaboration with V.C.R) (2021)
- "Table 42" featuring Pink Siifu (released in collaboration with Taphari) (2021)
- "lng hair dnt care" (2021)
- "Bussin' (Cold)" (released in collaboration with Turich Benjy) (2021)
- "48" (released in collaboration with Maxo) (2022)
- "Looking for Water" featuring Boldy James (released in collaboration with Real Bad Man and Boldy James) (2022)
- "Pour The Wine" featuring Peso Gordon & Chuck Strangers (released in collaboration with Real Bad Man, Peso Gordon, and Chuck Strangers) (2022)
- "L's (Eyedress Remix)" featuring Fousheé (released in collaboration with Fly Anakin & Fousheé) (2022)
- Bonded (released in collaboration with B. Cool-Aid and Awhlee) (2022)
- "Cnt Go Back (Tell Me)" (released in collaboration with B. Cool-Aid, Awhlee, Liv.e, Butcher Brown, Rimeta Rose, V.C.R. & Maurice II) (2023)
