= Liv.e =

American singer (born 1998)

- Also known as: (Liv).e; Jade Fox; HayLee
- Born: Hailee Olivia Williams; January 8, 1998 (age 28); Dallas, Texas, U.S.
- Genres: Neo-soul; alternative R&B; psychedelic soul
- Occupations: Singer; songwriter; rapper; record producer
- Years active: 2017-present
- Labels: In Real Life; Dolfin
- Formerly of: Kryptonyte

Hailee Olivia Williams (born January 8, 1998), known professionally as Liv.e (pronounced 'Liv'), is an American singer, songwriter, rapper and record producer. Originally from Dallas, Texas, her sound has been described as 'defying categorisation', incorporating elements from R&B, neo-soul, pop, hip-hop and jazz.

Liv.e began her career with a series of EPs in 2017 and 2018. After collaborating with artists such as Earl Sweatshirt and Pink Siifu, she released her solo debut album Couldn't Wait to Tell You in 2020 to critical acclaim. Her following album, Girl in the Half Pearl, was released to further acclaim in 2023. Liv.e's most recent solo release was the synth-punk and synthwave-influenced Past Futur.e (2024). In 2025, she formed the supergroup GENA with drummer Karriem Riggins, releasing the album The Pleasure Is Yours in 2026.

Liv.e produces music under the alias HayLee, and also raps under the name Jade Fox as part of the music group Kryptonyte.

== Early life ==
Hailee Olivia Williams was born in Dallas, Texas in 1998. She was raised in a religious Baptist household and has described her parents as 'avid church-goers'. Her family is highly musical: her father, Norman Williams, played piano for several blues and gospel ensembles, her mother sang in the local church choir, and her brother, drummer TaRon Lockett, has played with artists including Erykah Badu and Prince. She attended Booker T. Washington High School for the Performing and Visual Arts, graduating in 2016, and then studied architecture and object design at the School of the Art Institute of Chicago for a year before dropping out.

== Career ==
=== 2017–2019: Early career ===
Liv.e began experimenting with DJing in 2014, uploading several chopped and screwed mixes to SoundCloud. However, seeking to move away from her family's musical background, she did not seriously consider a career in music until 2017 whilst at university in Chicago.

After meeting Ben Hixon, president of Dallas-based record label and music collective Dolfin Records, at a jazz show, Liv.e began working with the label and several of its members. She released her debut EP, Frank, in 2017 under Dolfin. Her EP Raw Daybreaks, Vol. 1 was recorded in a single night and released later that year; its follow-up, entitled Raw Daybreaks, Vol. 2 (a collaboration with producer Swarvy) was released in 2018. Also in 2018, she formed the music group Kryptonyte with frequent collaborators Pink Siifu and Lord Byron, rapping with them under the alias Jade Fox; the group released a self-titled album that year.

Liv.e's 2018 EP Hoopdreams, which was also recorded in one night, caught the attention of Tyler, the Creator and Earl Sweatshirt. She subsequently opened for Earl Sweatshirt on his Fire It Up! tour, in support of his album Some Rap Songs. Liv.e also featured on the track 'Mtomb' from his 2019 EP Feet of Clay.

=== 2020–2022: Couldn't Wait to Tell You ===
On July 31, 2020, Liv.e released her debut studio album as a solo artist, Couldn't Wait to Tell You, under the label In Real Life. The album was recorded in Liv.e's bedroom in her mother's house in St. Louis, Missouri. Liv.e worked in Urban Outfitters during the writing of the album.

The album debuted via livestream on singer Erykah Badu's website as part of her Quarantine Concert Series project. Badu, who attended the same high school as Liv.e over a decade prior, has described Liv.e as 'family since forever' and termed her work 'an extension of what I am creating'. The album received critical acclaim from music journalists, with Liv.e being named 'one to watch' by The Guardian's Kate Hutchinson. However, due to the COVID-19 pandemic, she was unable to tour extensively in support of Couldn't Wait to Tell You. She continued to collaborate with other artists in 2020 and appeared on Black Noi$e's track "The Band", released in June that year.

Liv.e released an EP composed of six leftover songs from Couldn't Wait to Tell You, entitled CWTTY+, in 2021. CWTTY+ was named one of the best R&B albums of 2021 by NPR. Later that year, Liv.e released the single “Bout It”, and embarked on a co-headlining tour with New York-based rapper MIKE.

=== 2023–2024: Girl in the Half Pearl and Past Futur.e ===
Ahead of the release of her second studio album, Girl in the Half Pearl, Liv.e was named one of 25 "New and Rising Artists Shaping the Future of Music in 2023" by Pitchfork. Preceded by three singles, "Ghost", "Wild Animals" and "Find Out", the album was released in February 2023 to critical acclaim. She has described Girl in the Half Pearl as informed by an 'emotionally addictive, unbalanced romantic relationship'. It was named as one of the best albums of 2023 in year-end lists from publications including Clash, Pitchfork and Slant Magazine. GITHPRemixEdition, a remix album of Girl in the Half Pearl in collaboration with Ben Hixon, was released later in 2023. Liv.e performed at Tyler, the Creator's festival Camp Flog Gnaw Carnival in November that year.

In 2024, Liv.e surprise released the record Past Futur.e. Its condensed recording process was inspired by her 2018 EP Hoopdreams. Past Futur.e, which has been described as an album, EP and mixtape, marks a departure from the sound of her previous work, taking inspiration from synthwave and synth-punk.

=== 2025–present: Gena ===
Liv.e formed Gena, a duo with drummer and producer Karriem Riggins, and released their debut single, "Circlesz", in November 2025. The name is short for "God Energy, Naturally Amazing". The duo's debut album, The Pleasure Is Yours, released in February 2026.

== Influences ==
Growing up, Liv.e listened to artists including The Clark Sisters, Earth, Wind & Fire, Stevie Wonder, Johnny "Guitar" Watson, Herbie Hancock, Outkast, N.E.R.D., and Kanye West. Her early DJ mixes feature music from artists such as the Fugees, Madlib and Knxwledge.

== Personal life ==
Liv.e is based in Los Angeles. She is bisexual.

== Discography ==
Studio albums

- Couldn't Wait to Tell You (2020)
- Girl in the Half Pearl (2023)

Albums with Kryptonyte

- Kryptonyte (2018)

Albums with Karriem Riggins

- The Pleasure Is Yours (as Gena, 2026)

EPs

- Frank (2017)
- Raw Daybreaks, Vol. 1 (2017)
- Raw Daybreaks, Vol. 2 (2018) (with Swarvy)
- Hoopdreams (2018)
- CWTTY+ (2021)
- Past Futur.e (2024)

Remix albums

- GITHPRemixEdition (2023) (with Ben Hixon)
