= Jay Electronica discography =

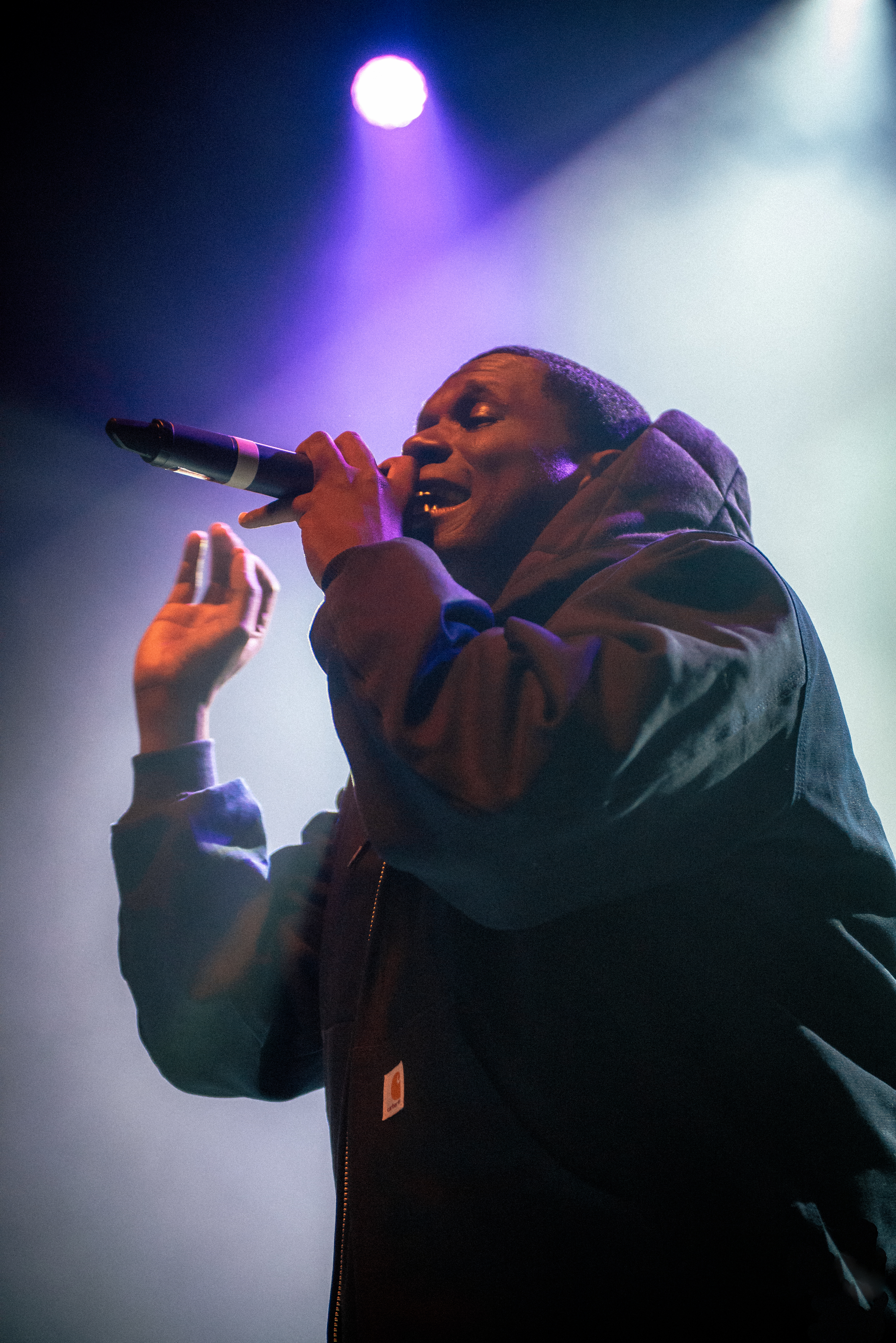
- Jay Electronica performing in 2018
- Studio albums: 2
- EPs: 3
- Mixtapes: 2
- Singles: 10

The discography of American rapper Jay Electronica consists of two studio albums, three extended plays, two mixtapes, nine singles (including 6 as a featured artist), one promotional single, and thirty-eight guest appearances. His debut mixtape under the "Jay Electronica" name, Act I: Eternal Sunshine (The Pledge), was released on July 2, 2007, and became his breakout project, being downloaded 50,000 times in its first month. Its sequel, Act II: The Patents of Nobility (The Turn), was recorded from 2010 to 2012, but was shelved until it was released on October 5, 2020.

In 2009, Electronica released his debut single, "Exhibit A (Transmissions)", alongside his second single, the critically-acclaimed "Exhibit C", which peaked at number 86 on the Hot R&B/Hip-Hop Songs chart and was remixed by numerous artists. It also started a bidding war that got him signed to Jay-Z's Roc Nation in 2010. In 2013, he was featured alongside Kendrick Lamar on Big Sean's "Control", which peaked at number 11 on the Billboard Bubbling Under Hot 100 Singles chart, and in 2018, he was featured alongside Justin Bieber on Poo Bear's "Hard 2 Face Reality", which peaked at number 6 on the chart.

On March 13, 2020, he released his debut studio album, A Written Testimony. It contained the single "Shiny Suit Theory" (featuring Jay-Z and The-Dream), which was released back in 2018. The album itself was critically and commercially successful, charting at number 12 on the Billboard 200 and peaked at number 8 on the Top R&B/Hip-Hop Albums chart. It was also nominated for Best Rap Album at the 63rd Annual Grammy Awards. The album's third track, "The Blinding" (featuring Travis Scott) peaked at number 9 on the Billboard Bubbling Under Hot 100 Singles chart, despite not being released as a single.

Electronica made his first appearance on the Billboard Hot 100 with the song "Jesus Lord" from Kanye West's album Donda in 2021, peaking at number 26 on the chart. He also appeared on the track's sequel, alongside The Lox. In 2025, Electronica rereleased Act I: Eternal Sunshine (The Pledge) and Act II: The Patents of Nobility (The Turn) onto streaming services. These re-released were followed by the album A Written Testimony: Leaflets on September 19, the extended play (EP) A Written Testimony: Power at the Rate of My Dreams, also released on September 19, and the album A Written Testimony: Mars, the Inhabited Planet on September 21.

== Studio albums ==
List of studio albums, with selected information
Title	Album details	Peak chart positions						
Title	Album details	US	US R&B	AUS	BEL (FL)	CAN	SWI	UK
A Written Testimony	Released: March 13, 2020; Label: Roc Nation; Formats: CD, LP, cassette, streaming, digital download	12	8	94	156	43	65	53
Act II: The Patents of Nobility (The Turn)	Released: October 5, 2020; Label: Roc Nation; Formats: Streaming, digital download	—	—	—	—	—	—	—

== Mixtapes ==
List of mixtapes, with selected information
Title	Album details
The Awakening (as Je'Ri Allah)	Released: 2000; Label: Boss and Family Records; Format: Bootleg, digital download
Act I: Eternal Sunshine (The Pledge)	Released: July 2, 2007; Self-released; Formats: Streaming, digital download

== EPs ==
List of extended plays, with selected information
Title	EP details
A Written Testimony: Leaflets	Released: September 19, 2025; Label: Roc Nation; Formats: Streaming, digital download
A Written Testimony: Power at the Rate of My Dreams	Released: September 19, 2025; Label: Roc Nation; Formats: Streaming, digital download
A Written Testimony: Mars, the Inhabited Planet	Released: September 21, 2025; Label: Roc Nation; Formats: Streaming, digital download

== Singles ==
=== As lead artist ===
List of singles as lead artist, with selected chart positions, showing year released and album name
Title	Year	Peak chart positions	Album
Title	Year	US R&B/HH	Album
"Exhibit A (Transformations)"	2009	—	non-album singles
"Exhibit C"	2009	86	non-album singles
"Shiny Suit Theory" (featuring The-Dream and Jay-Z)	2018	—	A Written Testimony and Act II: The Patents of Nobility (The Turn)
"—" denotes releases that did not chart.

=== As featured artist ===
List of singles as featured artist, with selected chart positions, showing year released and album name
Title	Year	Peak chart positions		Album
Title	Year	US Bub.	US R&B	Album
"Just Begun" (Reflection Eternal featuring J. Cole, Mos Def and Jay Electronica)	2010	—	—	Revolutions per Minute
"Close Your Eyes" (The Bullitts featuring Lucy Liu and Jay Electronica)	2011	—	—	They Die By Dawn & Other Short Stories...
"Control" (Big Sean featuring Kendrick Lamar and Jay Electronica)	2013	11	43	Non-album single
"Garden" (Emeli Sandé featuring Áine Zion & Jay Electronica)	2016	—	—	Long Live the Angels
"Hard 2 Face Reality" (Poo Bear featuring Justin Bieber and Jay Electronica)	2018	6	—	Poo Bear Presents Bearthday Music
"The Way" (Rosie Lowe featuring Jay Electronica)	2019	—	—	Yu
"Barz Simpson" (Sonnyjim featuring Jay Electronica & MF Doom)	2022	—	—	White Girl Wasted
"—" denotes releases that did not chart.

== Other charted songs ==
List of songs, with selected chart positions, showing year released and album name
Title	Year	Peak chart positions						Certifications	Album
Title	Year	US	US R&B	US Rap	AUS	CAN	UK R&B	Certifications	Album
"How Great" (Chance the Rapper featuring Jay Electronica)	2016	—	— (Note: "How Great" did not enter the Hot R&B/Hip-Hop Songs chart, but peaked at number ten on the Bubbling Under R&B/Hip-Hop Singles chart.)	—	—	—	—	RIAA: Gold	Coloring Book
"The Blinding" (featuring Travis Scott)	2020	— (Note: "The Blinding" did not enter the Billboard Hot 100, but peaked at number 9 on the Bubbling Under Hot 100 chart.)	—	—	—	—	—		A Written Testimony
"Jesus Lord" (Kanye West featuring Jay Electronica)	2021	26	13	11	44	26	16		Donda
"Jesus Lord, Pt. 2" (Kanye West featuring Jay Electronica and the Lox)	2021	—	—	—	94	—	—		Donda
"—" denotes a recording that did not chart or was not released in that territory.

== Guest appearances ==
List of non-single guest appearances, with other performing artists, showing year released and album name
Title	Year	Album	Artist(s)
"Cool, Relax"	2008	10.Deep Presents the New Deal	Kidz in the Hall
"Walking (J.Period Remix)"	2009	The Madness	Nneka, J.Period
"Love Czars II"	2009	—N/a	Sa-Ra, Ta'Raach
"The Day"	2010	Pilot Talk	Curren$y, Mos Def
"Live It"	2010	Heart of a Champion	Paul Wall, Raekwon, Yelawolf
"Prowler 2"	2010	24 Hour Karate School	Ski Beatz, Jean Grae, Joell Ortiz, Yasiin Bey
"Higher"	2010	—N/a	Game, Swizz Beatz
"Hail Mary"	2012	So Magnolia	CETO
"Atom Anthem"	2012	#ATOM 12.12.12	D Prosper
"Suplexes Inside of Complexes and Duplexes"	2013	Watching Movies with the Sound Off	Mac Miller
"They Die By Dawn"	2013	They Die By Dawn & Other Short Stories...	The Bullitts, Lucy Liu, Yasiin Bey
"Murder Death Kill"	2013	They Die By Dawn & Other Short Stories...	The Bullitts
"Jedi Code"	2013	She Got Game	Rapsody, Phonte
"Kingdom (Remix)"	2014	—N/a	Common, Vince Staples
"To Me, To You"	2014	PRhyme	Royce da 5'9" and DJ Premier
"Mind Glitch (Intro)"	2016	DJ Insite, Danii Phae	Dimension_2
"Call of Duty"	2016	Prodigy	R.I.P. #2
"How Great"	2016	Coloring Book	Chance the Rapper, My Cousin Nicole
"All of Us"	2017	Radio Silence	Talib Kweli, Yummy Bingham
"No Hoodie (Nothin' to Lose)"	2019	Hoodies for the Homeless	Dave East, 070 Phi
"Love Galaxy"	2020	Paul Epworth, Lil Silva	Voyager
"Diving for Pearls"	2020	Shaykh the World	Sons of Yusuf
"AD6"	2021	Pilot Talk 4	Curren$y
"Red"	2021	USee4Yourself	IDK, MF Doom, Westside Gunn
"Jesus Lord"	2021	Donda	Kanye West
"Jesus Lord, Pt. 2"	2021	Donda	Kanye West, The Lox
"Free Kutter"	2021	Hitler Wears Hermes 8: Side B	Westside Gunn
"Top of the Worlds"	2021	Chomp 2	Russ
"Jay's Repirse"	2022	3000	Ambre
"Khalas"	2023	Hip Hop 50: Vol. 2	Swizz Beatz
"Enough"	2023	I Thought It'd Be Different	Rory, Reggie
"Weeping Poets"	2023	Victor	Vic Mensa
"balloons"	2023	Sundial	Noname
"Can You Imagine"	2024	Hood Hymns	Tobe Nwigwe
"Still Here"	2024	Vote or Else	Black Thought, Freeway, Benny the Butcher
"The Final Call"	2025	Dave East & Ransom	The Final Call
"Leaflets"	2025	—N/a	Godfather of Harlem: Season 4
"Just a Drop"	2025	Star Line	Chance the Rapper
"Allahuakbars"	2026	The Bridge	Tobe Nwigwe, Fat Nwigwe

== Production discography ==
=== 2007 ===
==== Jay Electronica – Act I: The Eternal Sunshine (The Pledge) ====
- 1. "Foreword" (featuring Erykah Badu and Just Blaze)
- 2. "Eternal Sunshine of the Spotless Mind"
- 3. "...Because He Broke the Rules"
- 4. "Voodoo Man"
- 5. "FYI"

=== 2008 ===
==== Nas – Untitled Nas album ====
- 1. "Queens Get the Money"
  - Sample credit: John Powell – "I Am Sam (Theme)"

==== Jay Electronica – Scratches & Demos Vol.1 ====
- 1. "Annakin's Prayer"

=== 2013 ===
==== Self Scientific – Have Mercy ====
- 00. "Mercy" (featuring Kobe) (produced with DJ Khalil)
