= Act II =

Act II or Act Two or Act 2 may refer to:

== Brands ==
- Act II (popcorn), a brand of popcorn in North America

== Music ==
- Act II: Cowboy Carter, 2024 album by Beyoncé
- Act Two (Collabro album), 2014
- Act Two (The Seldom Scene album), 1973
- Act II (Tokio album), 2005
- Act II (Tarja album), 2018
- Act II: The Father of Death, an album by the Protomen, 2009
- Act II: The Meaning of, and All Things Regarding Ms. Leading, an album by The Dear Hunter, 2007
- Act 2: The Blood and the Life Eternal, an album by Neverending White Lights, 2006
- "Act II", 1993 concert tour by Prince; see Act I and II
- Act II: The Patents of Nobility (The Turn), an album by Jay Electronica, 2020
- Act 2 (Their God), an album by Tapir!, 2023
- Act. 2 Narcissus, 2017 EP by Gugudan
- "Act II: Date @ 8", 2023 song by 4Batz

== See also ==
- Act Too Group, Sussex UK theatre troupe
- Act (drama), a division or unit of a drama
- Act (disambiguation)
- Act One (disambiguation)
- Act III (disambiguation)
