= A Written Testimony =

Studio album by Jay Electronica
- Released: March 13, 2020
- Recorded: December 26, 2019 – February 6, 2020 (Note: Except "Shiny Suit Theory", recorded in 2010.)
- Genres: Islamic hip hop; conscious rap; psychedelic
- Length: 39:34
- Languages: English; Arabic
- Label: Roc Nation
- Producers: Jay Electronica; Swizz Beatz; Hit-Boy; The Alchemist; No I.D.; Khruangbin

Jay Electronica chronology
Act I: Eternal Sunshine (The Pledge) (2007)	A Written Testimony (2020)	Act II: The Patents of Nobility (The Turn) (2020)

Singles from A Written Testimony
- 1. "Shiny Suit Theory" Released: November 5, 2010

A Written Testimony (Arabic: شهادة مكتوبة) is the debut studio album by American rapper Jay Electronica. It was released on March 13, 2020, through Roc Nation. The album follows the release of Jay Electronica's debut mixtape, Act I: Eternal Sunshine (The Pledge), almost 13 years earlier. A Written Testimony was primarily recorded in 40 days, from the 26th of December, 2019, to the 6th of February, 2020. Lyrically, it is influenced by the doctrine of the Nation of Islam, and is thus described as an Islamic hip-hop record, with elements of conscious rap and psychedelia.

Most of the tracks on A Written Testimony feature uncredited appearances by Jay-Z, while Travis Scott and The-Dream make credited guest appearances. Louis Farrakhan, James Blake, James Fauntleroy, and other artists provide additional vocals. Production was primarily handled by Jay Electronica, who is credited on six out of ten tracks, along with Swizz Beatz, Hit-Boy, the Alchemist, No I.D., and Khruangbin, among others. Before its release, the album was supported by "Shiny Suit Theory", featuring vocals from Jay-Z and The-Dream, originally released on the 5th of November, 2010, and rereleased as a single on Tidal in September 2018.

The album received widespread acclaim from music critics, praising Jay Electronica's rapping and production, though certain controversial lyrics have been characterized as antisemitic. Commercially, the album debuted at number 12 on the US Billboard 200 and also charted in Canada, the United Kingdom, Switzerland, and Belgium. It charted its highest on the Top R&B/Hip-Hop Albums chart, peaking at number 8. It would also receive a nomination for Best Rap Album at the 2021 Grammy Awards, although it would lose to Nas' King's Disease (2020). A Written Testimony would later be followed up by the albums A Written Testimony: Leaflets and A Written Testimony: Mars, the Inhabited Planet and the extended play (EP) A Written Testimony: Power at the Rate of My Dreams, all released in 2025.

== Background ==
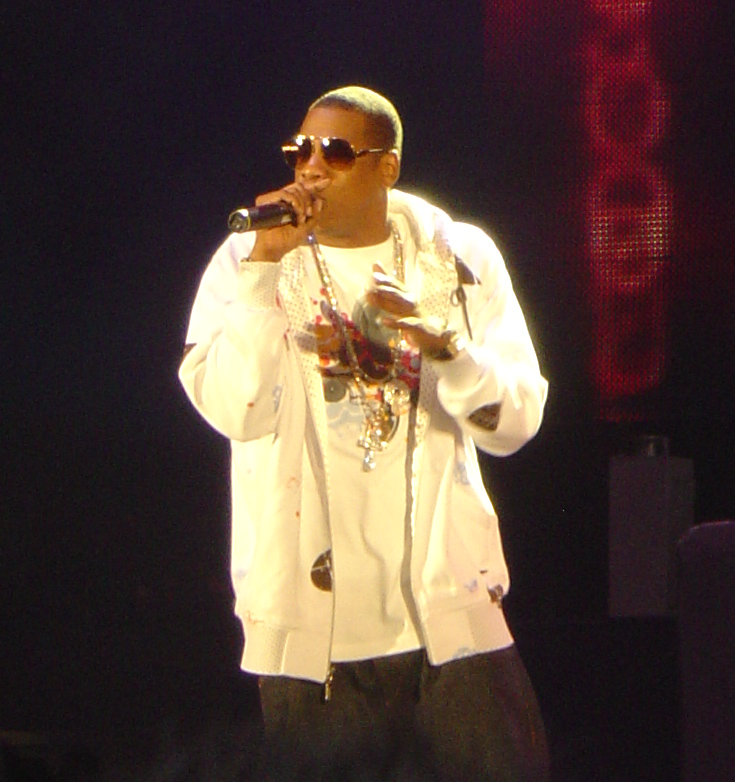
Jay-Z signed Jay Electronica to Roc Nation in 2010. He makes uncredited appearances on 8 of the album's 10 tracks.

Jay Electronica's debut mixtape Act I: Eternal Sunshine (The Pledge), released in July 2007, was meant to be the first part of a trilogy, with the follow-up being set to be entitled Act II: The Patents of Nobility (The Turn). In September of that year, Jay Electronica indicated that he planned to create both Act II and Act III. Following the official release of his hit single "Exhibit C", he announced on American music station Shade 45 that Act II would be released on Christmas Day 2009; American record producer Just Blaze confirmed shortly after that the album would miss this date.

In February 2010, Jay Electronica stated that he was planning collaborative projects with American rappers Mos Def, Lupe Fiasco, and Nas. In August 2010, he stated that Act II would be released on his birthday, September 19, within that year. In November 2010, American rapper Jay-Z signed Jay Electronica to his record label Roc Nation and they released their first collaborative song, entitled "Shiny Suit Theory". The latter announced that Act II was completed in 2011 and later shared a track list the following year. The track list included guest appearances from Jay-Z, fellow rappers Kanye West and Sean Combs, American singer The-Dream, and English-French actress Charlotte Gainsbourg, among others. The album was ultimately not released. Several songs included on the Act II track list have been officially released or leaked. After the entire album leaked, it was later officially released in October 2020.

Jay Electronica denounced the traditional roll-out of studio albums in 2017, stating "[a]n album is something that was created by corporations as a product to make money." In March 2019, he teased on Instagram that he may work with Jay-Z on his album.

== Recording ==
On February 6, 2020, Jay Electronica announced that he had completed his debut studio album A Written Testimony. He recorded the album in "40 days and 40 nights", beginning on December 26, 2019. (Note: The time period of "40 days and 40 nights" is a reference to the biblical Temptation of Christ.) The track "The Neverending Story" was produced by American musician the Alchemist three to four years prior to A Written Testimony, as a result of a trip he took to Argentina with rapper Eminem. Jay Electronica and Jay-Z recorded the final track, "A.P.I.D.T.A.", on the night of January 26, 2020, when former NBA player Kobe Bryant died in a helicopter crash. The former set an initial release date of March 18, 2020, which was 40 days after recording was completed.

== Music and composition ==
"Flux Capacitor"
Sample of the album's seventh track "Flux Capacitor". The production has been described as chaotic and messy. The song is built on a sample of Barbadian singer Rihanna's 2016 track "Higher". The refrain interpolates Louisiana rapper Lil Elt's 1994 song "Get the Gat".

A Written Testimony is a hip hop record, and features Islamic influence. It has been compared to Jay Electronica's earlier releases, due to the psychedelic production and minimal drums. The album incorporates elements of ambient and soul music, and samples of pop music. Fred Thomas of AllMusic described it as "a new step forward in the evolution of hip-hop." Rashad Grove of Consequence of Sound noted the "unorthodox sonic tapestries" of A Written Testimony. Despite the album being billed as a solo Jay Electronica project, it has been described as a collaborative effort due to Jay-Z's uncredited appearance on 8 out of 10 tracks, drawing comparisons to the latter's previous albums Watch the Throne (2011) with West and Everything Is Love (2018) with his wife Beyoncé. Jay Electronica raps in Arabic throughout A Written Testimony, with one line delivered in Spanish.

"The Ghost of Soulja Slim" resembles the minimalism of American record producer J Dilla. Clash described the track as reminiscent of Jay Electronica's previous releases, noting the "unusual production, demo-like mixing and the MCs vocals front-and-centre." The track, along with "Ezekiel's Wheel", includes a lo-fi sample. The latter samples ambient musical duo Fripp & Eno and features a repetitive motorik click. It has been described as slow, dreamy, and atmospheric. William E. Ketchum III, writing for Vibe, described "The Neverending Story" as including "a somber, piano-laced Alchemist beat". "Shiny Suit Theory" is made up of jazz production. The cinematic production on "Universal Soldier" is constructed with a sample of English singer-songwriter Vashti Bunyan, and echoed vocals by English singer James Blake. The production on "Flux Capacitor" has been described as chaotic and messy, with the track being built on a sped-up sample of Barbadian singer Rihanna.

== Themes and lyrics ==
"The Blinding"
Sample of the album's third track "The Blinding". Jay Electronica and Jay-Z's back-and-forth delivery has been compared to Watch the Throne (2011), the latter's collaborative album with Kanye West.

A Written Testimony is influenced by Nation of Islam doctrine, which made Jay Electronica feel empowered when he was young. He praises Nation of Islam leader Louis Farrakhan and Roc Nation founder Jay-Z, the latter of whom appears throughout the album. Samples of Farrakhan's vocals serve as the opening to A Written Testimony. Jay Electronica raps about his internal spiritual virtues and his own self-doubt, while appealing to higher masters. Along with Jay-Z, he speaks about the Five-Percent Nation's idea of the black man as god. The two praise Allah and their ancestors who experienced unjustified suffering. Najma Sharif of Okayplayer wrote, "if Kanye West's Jesus Is King was a gospel rap album, this is a nasheed rap album for the skeptics and aspirational."

"The Overwhelming Event", "The Neverending Story", and "Flux Capacitor" allude to the Last Judgment. On "The Neverending Story", Jay Electronica tells the story of religion saving him from hopelessness. On "Flux Capacitor", Jay-Z addresses his controversial partnership with the National Football League. He has the opening lines on "The Ghost of Soulja Slim" by rapping about institutional racism. Jay Electronica describes himself and the former as prophets within the song, rapping: "If it come from me and Hov, consider it Qur'an.". On "The Blinding", the former makes a tongue-in-cheek allusion to his deliberate tardiness; he speaks about his anxiety in releasing A Written Testimony, which took nearly thirteen years to release. He also raps about Jay-Z pressuring him to release the album.

In a December 2010 interview, Jay Electronica explained that he and Jay-Z are talking to each of their own shrinks on "Shiny Suit Theory". The former's verse is based on advice given to him by Combs, who was actively pursuing him at the time to sign a record deal. On "Universal Soldier", Jay-Z expresses feeling unloved through a comparison of Colombian drug lord Pablo Escobar to Black Liberation Army member Assata Shakur. "Fruit of the Spirit" is a solo track that is political in nature, with Jay Electronica discussing the Flint water crisis, fake news, the Underground Railroad, African-American Muslims, and globalization. On "Ezekiel's Wheel", Jay Electronica raps about how he cemented a legacy for himself beyond his days of sharing music to Myspace. He mourns his mother's death and wrestles with the pain death brings him on the closing track "A.P.I.D.T.A.", an abbreviation for "all praise is due to Allah."

== Release and promotion ==
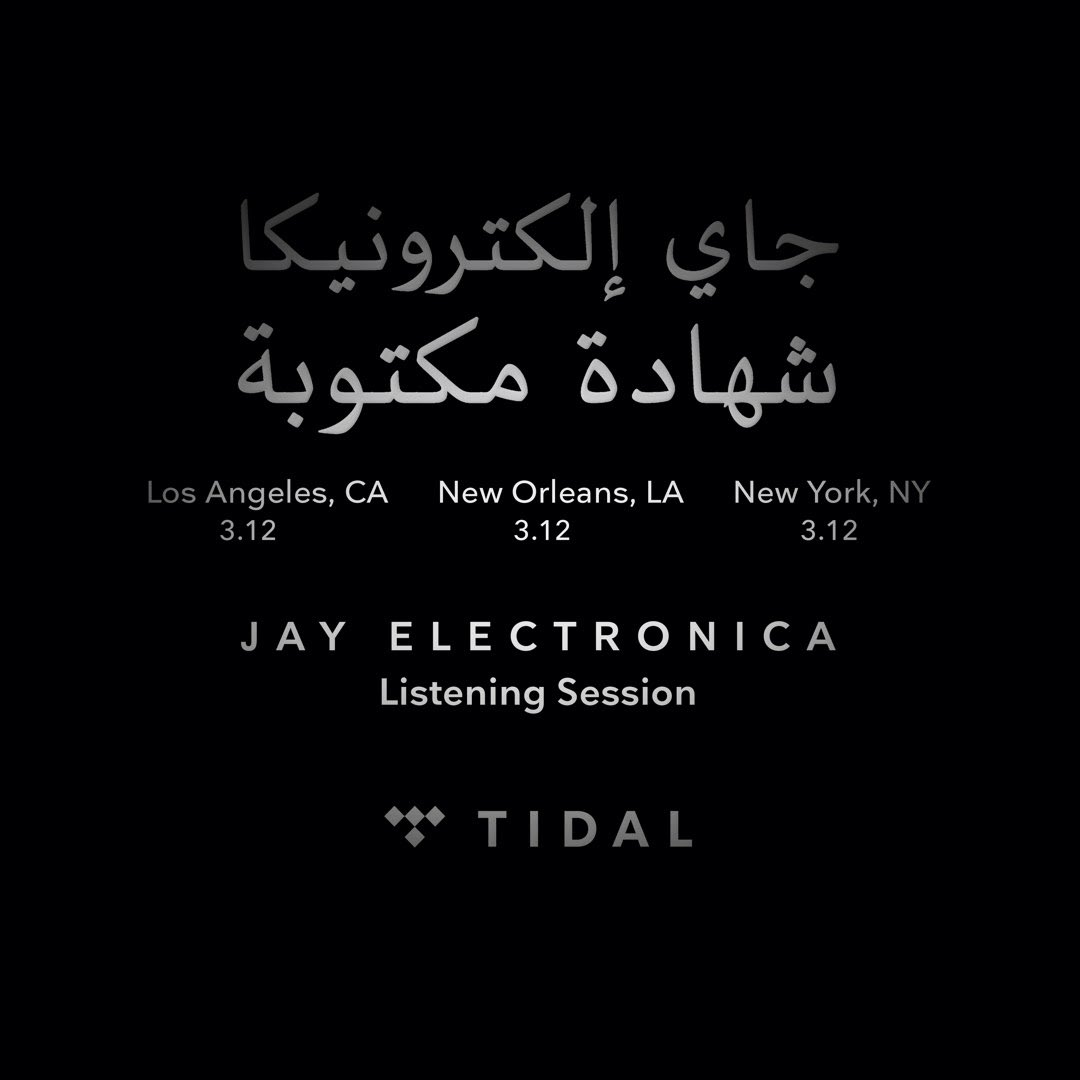
Listening parties A Written Testimony were cancelled due to the COVID-19 pandemic (poster pictured). Jay Electronica used Islamic symbolism to promote the album.

On February 6, 2020, Jay Electronica announced A Written Testimony with a release date of that year's March 18. In anticipation of the album's release, record producer Young Guru posted a picture of himself in the studio with the aforementioned, Jay-Z, and Lawrence "Law" Parker on March 10, 2020. That same day, streaming service Tidal announced three listening parties for it. Tidal planned to host the listening parties on March 12 of that year in Los Angeles, New York City, and Jay Electronica's hometown of New Orleans. On March 11, 2020, Angela Yee confirmed on The Breakfast Club that A Written Testimony would be released the day after the listening parties.

On March 12, 2020, Apple Music revealed the track listing for A Written Testimony through Twitter. The track listing, written in the Arabic language, includes 10 tracks with guest appearances from Travis Scott on "The Blinding" and The-Dream on "Ezekiel's Wheel", as well as "Shiny Suit Theory". After the track list was revealed, the listening parties were cancelled due to the COVID-19 pandemic and Tidal simultaneously revealed the album's cover art. The artwork was photographed by Beyoncé and is a picture of her swimming pool. Jay Electronica previewed A Written Testimony prior to its release, via an Instagram and YouTube livestream. Streetwear designer Jimmy Gorecki teased merchandise related to the album.

On November 15, 2010, Jay Electronica released his first collaborative song with Jay-Z and The-Dream entitled "Shiny Suit Theory" after signing to Roc Nation. In July 2012, a track list for Act II: Patents of Nobility (The Turn) was revealed that included a song titled "Dinner at Tiffanys (The Shiny Suit Theory)", featuring Charlotte Gainsbourg, Jay-Z, and The-Dream. "Shiny Suit Theory" was the second movement of a planned two-part song, with the unreleased first movement, "Dinner at Tiffanys", featuring a string arrangement by Gainsbourg with production from British singer-songwriter the Bullitts. In August 2017, Jay Electronica uploaded his remastered discography to YouTube, including "Shiny Suit Theory". On September 17, 2018, the song was rereleased as a single exclusively to Tidal. The song was included on the track list for A Written Testimony revealed in March 2020, with only The-Dream listed as a featured artist.

== Critical reception ==
Professional ratings
Aggregate scores
Source	Rating
AnyDecentMusic?	7.5/10
Metacritic	83/100
Review scores
Source	Rating
AllMusic	4.5/5 stars
And It Don't Stop	(3-star Honorable Mention)
Clash	8/10
Consequence of Sound	A−
Entertainment Weekly	B+
Exclaim!	7/10
HipHopDX	4/5
NME	3/5 stars
Pitchfork	8.4/10
Q	4/5 stars

A Written Testimony was met with widespread critical acclaim. At Metacritic, which assigns a weighted average rating out of 100 to reviews from professional publications, the album received an average score of 83, based on 11 reviews. Aggregator AnyDecentMusic? gave it 7.5 out of 10, based on their assessment of the critical consensus.

Grove praised the album as "one hell of a promising effort that was well worth the wait," further stating, "The skillset of Jay Electronica as both an MC and a producer is on full display, even when he does seemingly play Robin to Jay-Z's Dark Knight on his own project." A. Harmony of Exclaim! hailed it as "a solid effort that makes good on promises set by Electronica's earlier work: thumping, vintage beats; dense rhymes that shimmer with vivid imagery; clever references to the Nation of Islam." HipHopDX's Brody Kenny felt that the album was worth the anticipation, describing it as a "summation of why so many people have revered Jay Electronica for so long." Writing for Entertainment Weekly, Marcus J. Moore called it "an accomplished album with decent rewind factor, but it feels somewhat hampered by the seismic impact of the rapper's work a decade ago." In his review for NME, Dhruva Balram noted that Jay Electronica and Jay-Z "exchange epic verses in a style that's inevitably similar to Raekwon and Ghostface Killah on Only Built 4 Cuban Linx," however, he concluded that the album "is nothing spectacular; it won't shift or affect cultural discourse." Robert Christgau named "Ezekial's Wheel" and "Ghost of Soulja Slim" as highlights and said in summation, "He's good and then some, absolutely, but after all these years he has more to say about the prophet, who is himself, than to his flock, whoever that may be, and though the label owner's cameos are why we're here, respect to Farrakhan for his class-conscious rap".

In May 2020, Craig Jenkins of Vulture listed A Written Testimony among the best albums of the year thus far.

=== Accolades ===
Accolades for A Written Testimony
Publication	Accolade	Rank	Ref.
Billboard	Billboard's 50 Best Albums of 2020 – Mid-Year	—N/a	
Billboard	Top 50 Best Albums of 2020	49	
Complex	Best Albums of 2020	18	
Consequence of Sound	Top 50 Albums of 2020	22	
Crack Magazine	Top 50 Albums of 2020	20	
Entertainment Weekly	The 15 Best Albums of 2020	8	
The New York Times (Jon Caramanica)	Best Albums of 2020	4	
PopMatters	The 60 Best Albums of 2020	13	
Stereogum	Stereogum's 50 Best Albums of 2020 – Mid-Year	38	
Uproxx	The Best Albums and Songs of 2020	46	
Variety	Variety's Best Albums of 2020 – Mid-Year	—N/a	

Awards and nominations for A Written Testimony
Year	Award	Category	Result	Ref.
2021	Grammy Awards	Best Rap Album	Nominated	

== Controversy ==
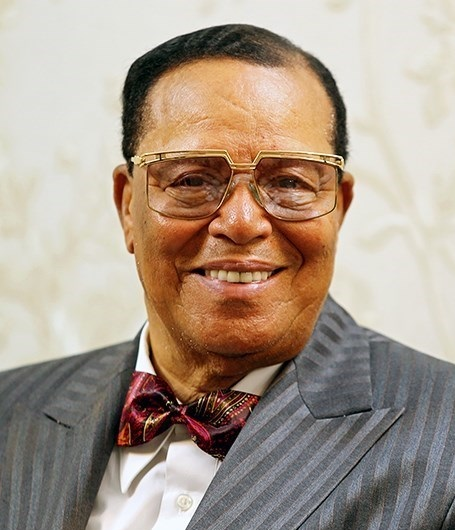
Louis Farrakhan, who has been designated as a hate extremist by the SPLC, is featured on the album.

On the track "The Ghost of Soulja Slim", Jay Electronica references the Synagogue of Satan and his ex-girlfriend Kate Rothschild. Jay Electronica had previously rapped about the Synagogue of Satan on the 2014 track "Better In Tune With the Infinite". Rothschild has been the subject of multiple antisemitic conspiracy theories. American radio personality Peter Rosenberg accused Jay Electronica of antisemitism for his Synagogue of Satan references. He responded by accusing Rosenberg of "clout chasing" and inviting him to a public forum with theological scholars to discuss the lyrics. Jay Electronica also stated that he stood behind "every single word" on A Written Testimony. FNR Tigg of Complex defended "The Ghost of Soulja Slim", writing that the particular line was not antisemitic but that Jay Electronica was "finding a clever way to vent about a personal vendetta he had against [Rothschild] who he feels aided in helping the media assassinate his character."

In an article about alleged antisemitic aspects of the album, Lee Harpin of The Jewish Chronicle noted the lyrics "Satan struck Palestine with yet another mortar" from the track "Fruits of the Spirit". Harpin, along with Gabe Friedman of The Jerusalem Post, highlighted the album's inclusion of vocals from Louis Farrakhan, the leader of the Nation of Islam who has been labelled as an extremist by the Southern Poverty Law Center due to antisemitic and Black supremacist views. Featured artist Jay-Z had also been previously cautioned by the Anti-Defamation League in 2017 for controversial lyrics.

Soon after release, Jay Electronica was also embroiled in an online dispute with American rapper-journalist Joe Budden. On his podcast, Budden criticized the album and stated that "Jay Electronica got smacked around by JAY-Z." Jay Electronica reacted by denouncing Budden's rap career, however an old video recorded by Angela Yee surfaced that showed him praising Budden as an MC.

== Commercial performance ==
A Written Testimony debuted at number 12 on the US Billboard 200 with over 31,000 album-equivalent units, of which nearly 11,000 were pure sales. It peaked at number eight and four on the US Top R&B/Hip-Hop Albums and Album Sales charts, respectively. The album reached number 43 on the Billboard Canadian Albums chart, number 53 on the UK Albums Chart, number 65 on the Schweizer Hitparade Swiss Albums chart, and number 156 on the Ultratop Flanders Belgium Albums chart. "The Blinding" peaked at number nine on the US Billboard Bubbling Under Hot 100.

== Track listing ==
A Written Testimony track listing
No.	Title	Writer(s)	Producer(s)	Length
1.	"The Overwhelming Event"	Louis Farrakhan; Éric Demarsan	Jay Electronica	2:17
2.	"Ghost of Soulja Slim"	Elpadaro Allah; Shawn Carter; Farrakhan; James Tapp; Craig Lawson; John Williams; Larrance Dopson; Khirye Tyler; Chris Payton	Jay Electronica	4:26
3.	"The Blinding" (featuring Jay-Z & Travis Scott)	Allah; Jacques Webster II; Carter; Kasseem Dean; Chauncey Hollis; Abraham Orellana; Jahron Brathwaite	Swizz Beatz; Hit-Boy; AraabMuzik^{[a]}; G. Ry^{[a]}	2:49
4.	"The Neverending Story"	Allah; Carter; Terius Nash; Daniel Alan Maman; Felix Nebbia; Mirtha Defilpo	The Alchemist	4:21
5.	"Shiny Suit Theory" (featuring Jay-Z & The-Dream)	Allah; Nash; Carter; Barbara Mason	Jay Electronica	4:04
6.	"Universal Soldier"	Allah; Carter; Webster; James Blake Litherland; Jennifer Vashti Bunyan; Allen Toussaint; Bonnie Rae Flower; Wendy Ellen Flower-Freeman	Jay Electronica	4:19
7.	"Flux Capacitor"	Allah; Carter; Robyn Fenty; Dion Wilson; Badriia Bourelly; James Fauntleroy; Jerry Butler II; Kenneth Gamble; Leon Huff; Lawrence Parker; Elton Newman; D'Artanian Stovall; Tyron Cosey	Jay Electronica; James Blake^{[b]}	3:27
8.	"Fruits of the Spirit"	Allah; Wilson; Rodney G. Massey	No I.D.	1:35
9.	"Ezekiel's Wheel" (featuring The-Dream)	Allah; Nash; Carter; Fauntleroy; Robert Fripp; Brian Eno	Jay Electronica	6:48
10.	"A.P.I.D.T.A."	Allah; Carter; Laura Manders; Mark Speer	Khruangbin	5:28
Total length:				39:34

=== Notes ===
- ^{^[a]} signifies a co-producer
- ^{^[b]} signifies an additional producer

==== Sample credits ====
- "The Overwhelming Event" contains elements of "Thème de Gerbier", written and composed by Éric Demarsan.
- "Ghost of Soulja Slim" contains elements of "Jennifer's French Movie", written and composed by John Williams.
- "The Blinding" contains samples from "Meru Washi" performed by Mbolele Sabulon.
- "The Neverending Story" contains elements of "La Caída", written by Felix Nebbia and Mirtha Defilpo, and performed by Litto Nebbia.
- "Shiny Suit Theory" contains elements of "Ain't Got the Love (Of One Girl on My Mind)", written by Barbara Mason, and performed by the Ambassadors.
- "Universal Soldier" contains samples of "Rain Rain Go Away", written by Allen Toussaint, and performed by Bob Azzam and his Orchestra; samples of "I Realized You", written by Bonnie Rae Flower and Wendy Ellen Flower-Freeman, and performed by Wendy and Bonnie; and samples of "Here Before", written and performed by Vashti Bunyan.
- "Flux Capacitor" contains samples of "Higher", written by Robyn Fenty, Dion Wilson, Badriia Bourelly, James Fauntleroy, Jerry Butler II, Kenneth Gamble and Leon Huff, and performed by Rihanna; and interpolations of "Get the Gat", written by Elton Newman, D'Artanian Stovall and Tyrone Cosey, and performed by Lil Elt.
- "Fruits of the Spirit" contains a sample of "Because I Loved You", performed by the Imaginations.
- "Ezekiel's Wheel" contains elements of "Evensong", written by Robert Fripp and Brian Eno, and composed by Fripp & Eno.
- "A.P.I.D.T.A." contains elements of "A Hymn", written by Laura Manders and Mark Speer, and performed by Khruangbin.

== Personnel ==
Musicians

- Louis Farrakhan – vocals (1, 2)
- Larrance Dopson – keyboards (1, 2)
- Khirye Tyler – guitar, organ, and keyboards (1, 2)
- Chris Payton – guitar and bass (1, 2)
- Terius "The-Dream" Nash – vocals (4)
- James Blake – vocals (6)
- Travis Scott – vocals (6)
- Ross Abrahams – keyboards (6)
- Law Parker – vocals (7)
- Steve Wyreman – bass, keyboards, and guitar (8)
- James Fauntleroy – vocals (9)
- Jeymes Samuel – vocals (9)
- Emory Jones – vocals (10)

Technical

- Tony Dawsey – mastering
- Young Guru – mixing (1–4, 6, 9), recording (all tracks)
- Jaycen Joshua – mixing (7, 8, 10)
- Dylan Del-Olmo – recording (1), engineering (2)
- Michael Chavarria – recording (5)
- Zach Steele – recording (10)
- Law Parker – recording assistance (3, 10)
- Mike Seaberg – mixing assistance (7, 8, 10)
- Jacob Richards – mixing assistance (7, 8, 10)

== Charts ==
Chart performance for A Written Testimony
Chart (2020)	Peak position
Australian Albums (ARIA)	94
Belgian Albums (Ultratop Flanders)	156
Canadian Albums (Billboard)	43
Swiss Albums (Schweizer Hitparade)	65
UK Albums (Official Charts)	53
US Billboard 200	12
US Top R&B/Hip-Hop Albums (Billboard)	8
