= Act I =

Act One most often refers to the first act of a play, opera, or other dramatic performance.

Act One, Act I, ACTI and similar may also refer to:

== Theatre, film and books ==
- Act One (book), a 1959 memoir by Moss Hart
  - Act One (1963 film), a film version of the memoir
  - Act One (play), a 2014 theatrical adaptation of the memoir by James Lapine
- Act One, Inc., an organization for aspiring filmmakers
- Act One (2026 film), an upcoming American psychological thriller film

== Music ==
- "Act I: Eternal Sunshine (The Pledge)", a 2007 composition by Jay Electronica
- Act I and II, a 1993 concert tour by Prince
- Act One (album), a 1970 album by Beggars Opera
- Act One, an album by Marian Hill
- Act One, a 2006 EP by I Hate Kate
- Act I (Seldom Scene album), a 1972 album by the Seldom Scene
- Act I: Live in Rosario, a 2012 live album by Tarja Turunen
- Act I: The Lake South, the River North a 2006 album by the Dear Hunter
- Act I: Renaissance, or simply Renaissance, a 2022 album by Beyoncé
- Act 1 (The Pilgrim), a 2022 album by Tapir!
- Act. 1 The Little Mermaid, 2016 EP by Gugudan

== See also ==
- The Act One Group, company founded by Janice Bryant Howroyd
- Acton Trussell (UK), formerly, Actone (England)
- ACTI (Automated Computer Telephone Interviewing)
- Act 1 adaptor protein
