= Shiny Suit Theory =

- Tidal 2018 rerelease cover art

Single by Jay Electronica featuring Jay-Z and The-Dream (Note: Jay-Z is not credited on the track list for A Written Testimony.)

from the album A Written Testimony and Act II: Patents of Nobility (The Turn)
- Released: November 15, 2010
- Recorded: September – November 2010
- Length: 4:04
- Label: Roc Nation
- Songwriters: Elpadaro F. Electronica Allah; Shawn Carter; Terius Nash; Barbara Mason
- Producer: Jay Electronica

Audio sample
- file; help

"Shiny Suit Theory" (Arabic: نظرية البدلة اللامعة) is a song by American rapper Jay Electronica, released through Roc Nation. The song features guest appearances from American rapper Jay-Z and American singer The-Dream. The song was recorded from September to November, 2010, and was produced by Electronica himself, who raps about his spiritual and theological development and life as well as cultural ramblings. The song is Jay Electronica's first collaboration with Jay-Z, who sent in his verse by email as an effort to sign Jay Electronica to a record deal.

The song first appeared online in November 2010 and was later rereleased on Tidal in September 2018. The song is the second of two parts, with the first movement being titled "Dinner at Tiffanys" with a guest feature from English-French actress Charlotte Gainsbourg. "Shiny Suit Theory" was meant to be included on Jay Electronica's album Act II: Patents of Nobility (The Turn), but was later included on his debut album A Written Testimony, which was released nearly ten years later in March 2020. The two movements were included on the October 2020 official release of Act II after the album leaked online.

== Background and recording ==
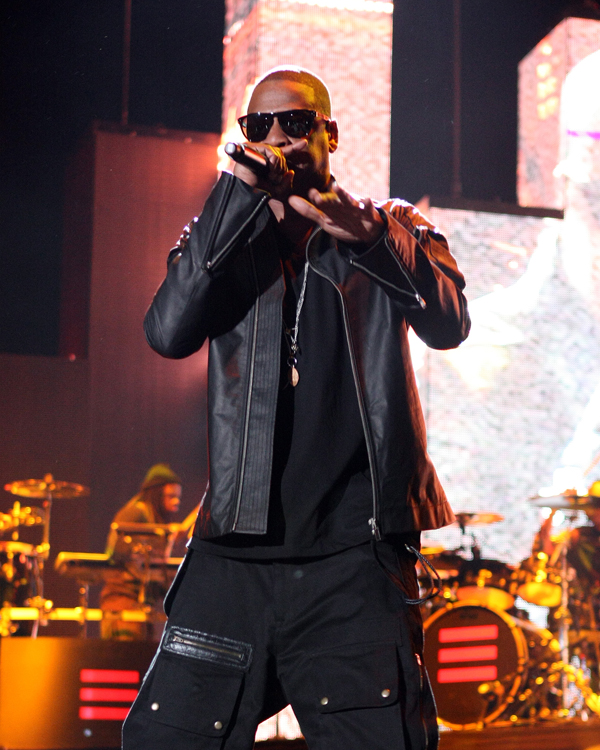
Jay-Z's (pictured) verse on "Shiny Suit Theory" was sent by email as an effort to sign Jay Electronica to Roc Nation.

At the beginning of his career, Jay Electronica would send demo tapes to American rapper Sean Combs' record label Bad Boy Records as an effort to get signed. In July 2007, Jay Electronica released his debut mixtape Act I: Eternal Sunshine (The Pledge). The mixtape has been described as his breakout project. After the release of the mixtape, Combs contacted Jay Electronica through video chat and then invited him to Miami the next day. Jay Electronica continued to garner an underground following with the release of his single "Exhibit C".

Jay Electronica met American rapper Jay-Z by chance at a birthday celebration for Atlantic Records COO Julie Greenwald at The Spotted Pig. The meeting was followed by "weeks of intense daily communication and creative courtship" related to Jay-Z wanting to sign Jay Electronica to his record label Roc Nation. According to American journalist Miss Info, Jay Electronica knew Jay-Z was serious when he attached a recorded verse to his second reply email. Jay-Z's verse lead to their first collaboration, "Shiny Suit Theory". On November 12, 2010, Jay Electronica officially announced that he had signed to Roc Nation. At the time, Combs was trying to sign Jay Electronica to his own label. Combs stated on Twitter that he felt betrayed but had no hostility towards Jay Electronica or Jay-Z. On November 15, 2010, Jay Electronica uploaded "Shiny Suit Theory" featuring Jay-Z and American singer The-Dream, along with the track "The Announcement", onto his SoundCloud.

"Shiny Suit Theory" is the second movement of a two-part song, with the first movement being titled "Dinner at Tiffanys". "Dinner at Tiffanys" was composed by British singer-songwriter The Bullitts, who worked on the movement's strings. English-French actress Charlotte Gainsbourg had a guest appearance on the movement, though Jay Electronica initially wanted English actress Julie Andrews. In July 2012, a track list for Act II: Patents of Nobility (The Turn) was revealed that included the song under the title "Dinner at Tiffanys (The Shiny Suit Theory)" featuring Jay-Z, The-Dream, and Gainsbourg. "Dinner at Tiffanys" was included on the October 2020 released of Act II after it leaked online.

== Composition and lyrics ==
"Shiny Suit Theory" is built on a sample of "Aint Got the Love (Of One Girl on My Mind)" performed by The Ambassadors. The production features no drums. The song is scattered with horns and bells, with "the notes fall[ing] just behind the beat." In a December 2010 interview, Jay Electronica explained that in the song, he and Jay-Z are talking to each of their own shrinks. Jay Electronica's verse is based on advice given to him by Combs, who was actively pursuing Jay Electronica at the time to sign a record deal.

== Release and promotion ==
On November 15, 2010, Jay Electronica uploaded "Shiny Suit Theory" onto his SoundCloud along with the track "The Announcement". In August 2017, Jay Electronica uploaded his remastered discography onto YouTube, including "Shiny Suit Theory". In September 2018, the original version of the song was rereleased exclusively to Tidal. On March 12, 2020, Apple Music revealed the track listing for A Written Testimony through Twitter. The track listing, written in the Arabic language, contained "Shiny Suit Theory" with only The-Dream listed as a featured artist. Eric Diep of Billboard described the inclusion of the decade-old song on the album as humorous.

In July 2014, Jay Electronica performed "Shiny Suit Theory" live with Jay-Z at The Brooklyn Hip-Hop Festival.

== Critical reception ==
In a November 2010 review, Tom Breihan of Pitchfork wrote that on "Shiny Suit Theory", Jay Electronica "finds a track just as off as he is." Breihan praised Jay-Z's verse, writing that "he can still rap his ass off when the mood strikes him." In March 2020, Andre Gee of Okayplayer wrote that though "[s]ome people rolled their eyes" when the decade-old song was included on the track list for A Written Testimony, it still deserved its place on the album. Gee expressed his opinion that the song still felt fresh.

== Credits and personnel ==
Credits and personnel from A Written Testimony adapted from Tidal.

- Jay Electronica – lead vocals, producer, composition, lyrics
- The-Dream – featured vocals, composition, lyrics
- Jay-Z – featured or uncredited vocals, composition, lyrics
- Tony Dawsey – mastering
- Michael Chavarria – recording
- Young Guru – recording
