= Just Begun =

Single by Reflection Eternal featuring Jay Electronica, J. Cole and Mos Def

from the album Revolutions per Minute
- Released: February 2, 2010
- Recorded: 2009
- Genre: Hip hop
- Length: 3:37
- Label: Blacksmith; Rawkus; Warner Bros.
- Songwriter(s): Timothy Thedford; Jermaine Cole; Dante Smith; Tony Cottrell; Talib Greene
- Producer(s): Hi-Tek

Reflection Eternal singles chronology
"The Blast" (2001)	"Just Begun" (2010)	"In This World" (2010)

Jay Electronica singles chronology
"Exhibit C" (2009)	"Just Begun" (2010)	"Hard 2 Face Reality" (2018)

J. Cole singles chronology
"Lights Please" (2009)	"Just Begun" (2010)	"All I Want Is You" (2010)

Mos Def singles chronology
"Stylo" (2010)	"Just Begun" (2010)	"Pride N Joy" (2012)

"Just Begun" is a song by American hip hop duo Reflection Eternal, composed of New York rapper Talib Kweli and Ohio producer Hi-Tek. The song was released on February 2, 2010, as the second single from their second studio album Revolutions per Minute (2010). The song is a posse cut featuring verses from rappers Jay Electronica, J. Cole and Mos Def, the latter of whom also forms a duo with Talib Kweli, known collectively as Black Star.

== Composition ==
The song's production was handled by Reflection Eternal's Hi-Tek. The song contains samples of "We've Only Just Begun" as performed by The Singers Unlimited. The four recording artists rap in succession, without a bridge or refrain separating their verses. They complement their verses by continuing each other's rhyme scheme. Jay Electronica and J. Cole share nose imagery with "I’m on a higher level, I’m on top of nosebleeds / Niggas say they sick, but when they rock they don’t sneeze". Mos Def practices internal rhymes, rapping "Get off him, there is not a parcel or a portion / Or a measure of a fortune more awesome". Talib Kweli makes references to Donnie Brasco, The Count of Monte Cristo, Iago and Othello of Othello, the Moor of Venice, as well as cigarillos.

== Reception ==
Nathan S. of DJBooth.net wrote "this All-Star emcee roster live up to their mic killing reputations, collectively creating something in the ballpark of a quasi-underground, super laid-back version of 'Forever'". Del F. Cowie of Exclaim noted "over a minimalist Hi-Tek beat, 'Just Begun' is a shrewd merging of established and cutting edge lyricists. Jay Electronica, with his current single, 'Exhibit C,' and Jay-Z Roc Nation signee J. Cole are both riding waves of increasing popularity, and both MCs put in notably hungry appearances that overflow with humility and hedonistic swagger, respectively. Kweli leads off the whole affair with a simile-laden verse, while the rejuvenated Mos Def's economic treatise cleans up on a track clearly focused on pugilistic lyrical dexterity." Chris Coplan of Consequence of Sound, criticized the instrumental, writing "'Just Begun' has a beat that is like bad smooth jazz on a loop and that burns and eats its way into your brain. Want to know what Mos Def was saying by the final verse? Me too. But Hi-Tek isn’t simply to blame. Kweli is a veteran of the game, and with that said, the lack of variances in his flow can be a hindrance."

== Release history ==
Country	Date	Format	Label
United States	February 2, 2010	Digital download	Warner Bros.
