= Act One, Inc. =

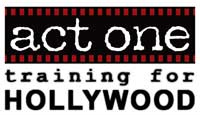
- Founded: 1999
- Founder: Barbara Nicolosi
- Location: Hollywood, California, USA
- Employees: 5
- Website: http://www.actoneprogram.com/

Act One, Inc. is a Christian, non-profit organization established in January 1999 by Barbara Nicolosi. A training program for aspiring filmmakers, Act One provides in-class instruction from professionals, internships, and practical experience. The program is divided into two branches: the Writing Program (with several advanced tiers for mentorship-driven workshops) and the Executive Program, which trains students in the development and production side of the business. Both programs typically take place side-by-side in the summer.

Act One is located on Beachwood Drive in Hollywood, California.

== History ==
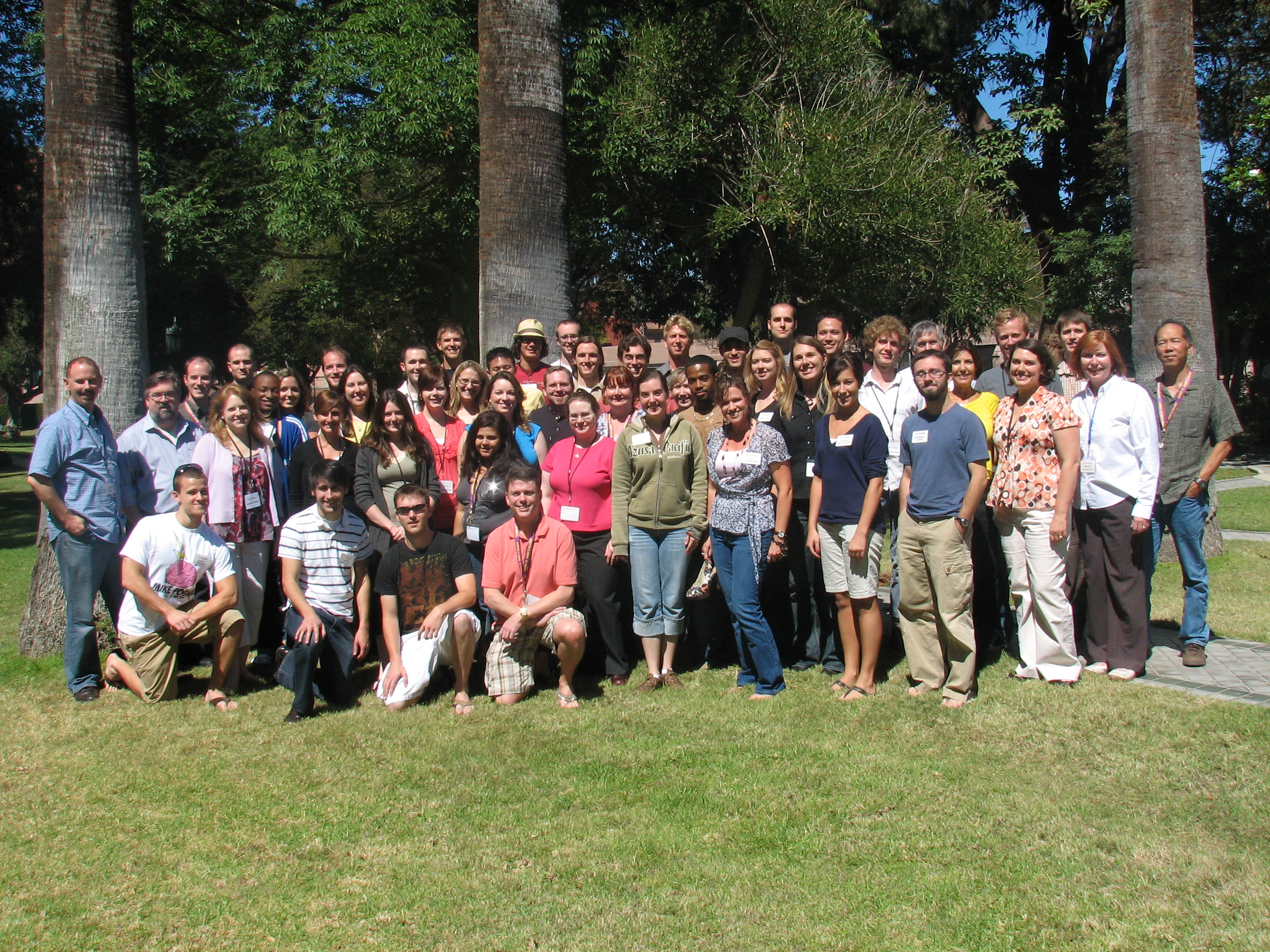
Summer 2009 Act One students

Act One was formed in January 1999 as an educational outreach to writers of the Christian entertainment fellowship Inter-Mission; initial funding was provided by the Stratford Foundation. A core group of Hollywood professionals came together with Act One's first class in hopes of passing on their experience. According to their promotional material, Act One's goal is not to produce explicitly religious entertainment, but movie and TV projects that respect and serve the global audience.

Act One was first stationed at Hollywood Presbyterian Church before relocating to their current location on Beachwood Drive.

== Academics ==
=== Writing Program for Screen and Television ===
The Writing Program was created the same year as Act One, and until 2009 was an intensive one-month course devoted to teaching the rigors of screenwriting; a TV track was added in 2002, allowing a select group of writing students to participate in a mockup of a real TV writer's room.

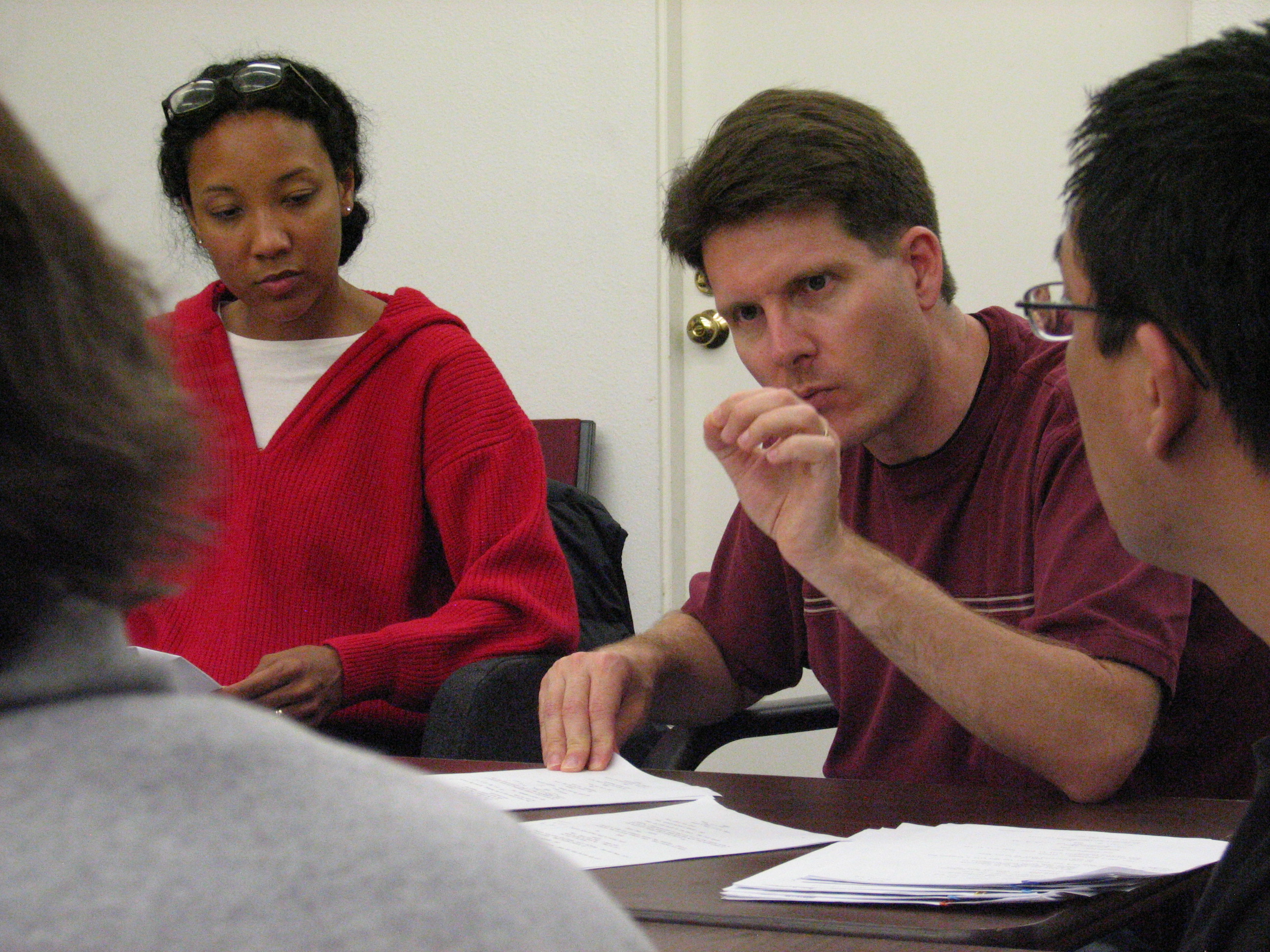
Faculty Instructor Dean Batali making a point at a writer's meeting, July 2009

=== Producing and Entertainment Executive Program ===
A 14-month Certificate Program in producing for mainstream screen and television, and preparing for careers in the entertainment industry. Subjects include business, creative development, physical production, and marketing and distribution. The program includes an eight-week internship at a studio or production company and the "Producer’s Spiritual Journey".
