= Act II: The Patents of Nobility (The Turn) =

- Original cover art

Studio album by Jay Electronica
- Released: October 5, 2020
- Recorded: 2010–2012
- Genre: Hip-hop
- Length: 52:07
- Labels: Roc Nation; Equity
- Producers: Jay Electronica; The Bullitts; Rich Kidd; DJ Khalil; Paul Epworth

Jay Electronica chronology
A Written Testimony (2020)	Act II: The Patents of Nobility (The Turn) (2020)	A Written Testimony: Leaflets (2025)

Singles from Act II: Patents of Nobility (The Turn)
- 1. "Life On Mars" Released: July 7, 2010; 2. "Shiny Suit Theory" Released: November 5, 2010; 3. "Better in Tune" Released: March 15, 2014; 4. "Road to Perdition" Released: March 6, 2015; 5. "Letter to Falon" Released: June 6, 2017

Act II: The Patents of Nobility (The Turn) is the second studio album by American rapper Jay Electronica. It originally released on October 5, 2020, through Roc Nation and Equity Distribution, after leaking in full the day prior, and seven months after the release of his debut album, A Written Testimony. The album, a hip-hop record, was recorded from 2010 to 2012. It was produced by Electronica himself, alongside the Bullitts, Rich Kidd, DJ Khalil, and Paul Epworth, and features guest appearances from the Bullitts, alongside fellow American rapper and Roc Nation founder Jay-Z, The-Dream, father and daughter Serge and Charlotte Gainsbourg, and LaTonya Givens.

Soon after Jay Electronica released his debut mixtape, Act I: Eternal Sunshine (The Pledge), on the 2nd of July, 2007, he announced Act II as a follow-up. A track listing was revealed in 2012. Several songs from the project were released as loose singles that Jay Electronica dropped over the years, among these are: "Life On Mars", "Better in Tune", "Road to Perdition", "Shiny Suit Theory", and "Letter to Falon", all released as singles from 2010 through 2017. Upon its release, the album was positively received by music critics, although the song "Better in Tune" would be criticized for antisemitic lyrics. The album would later be reissued on the 18th of September, 2025, alongside its predecessor, Act 1: Eternal Sunshine (The Pledge).

== Background ==
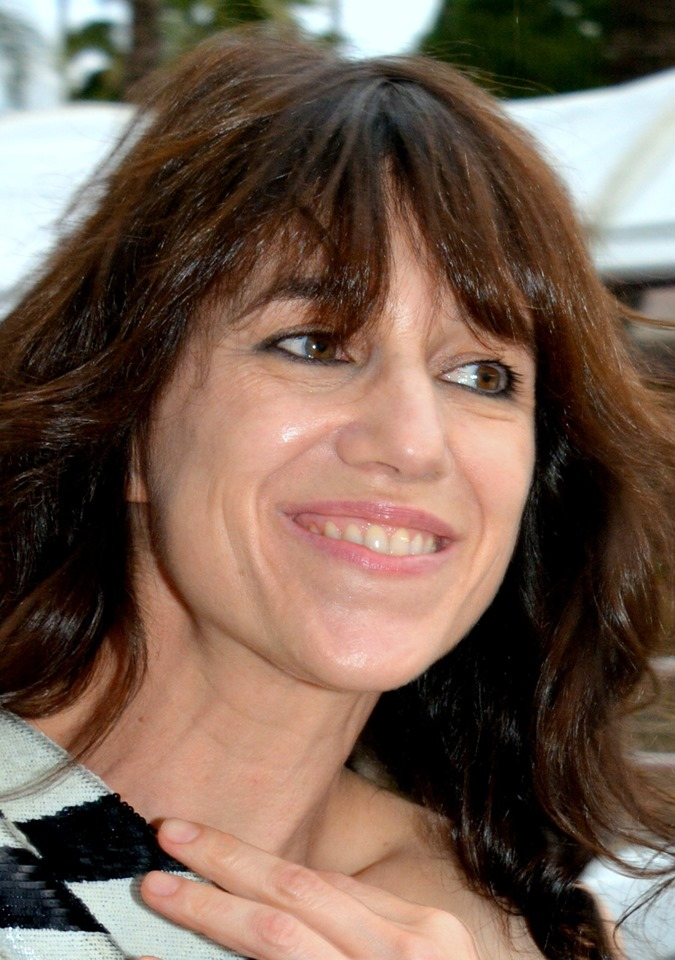
"Dinner at Tiffany's", featuring French actress Charlotte Gainsbourg, and "Shiny Suit Theory" are two movements of the same piece.

Jay Electronica's debut mixtape Act I: Eternal Sunshine (The Pledge) (2007) was meant to be the first part of a trilogy, with each title being inspired by the 2006 British-American film The Prestige. In September 2007, Jay Electronica indicated that he planned to create Act II and Act III. Following the official release of his hit single "Exhibit C", he announced on American music station Shade 45 that Act II would be released on Christmas Day 2009; American record producer Just Blaze confirmed shortly after that the album would miss this date.

Jay Electronica announced that The Patents of Nobility (The Turn) was complete in 2011 and shared a track listing on his Twitter page in 2012. The track listing included guest appearances from American rappers Jay-Z, Kanye West, and Sean Combs, American singer The-Dream, and English-French actress Charlotte Gainsbourg, amongst others. The album was not released. In 2014, Jay Electronica again announced that his album would be releasing that year. In February 2020, Jay Electronica announced that he completed his debut album over the course of 40 days, titled A Written Testimony. The album was released on March 13, 2020, nearly thirteen years after the release of Act I.

Several songs included on the Act II track list were officially released or leaked online. The songs "Shiny Suit Theory", "Better in Tune With the Infinite", "Road to Perdition", and "Letter to Fallon" were officially released as singles. British singer-songwriter The Bullitts released "Run & Hide" as a short film in July 2011. The tracks "Memories & Merlot" and "Real Magic" leaked in July 2019 and September 2020, respectively. The entire album leaked in October 2020, after which Jay Electronica announced the album would be officially released.

== Recording ==
"Shiny Suit Theory" came as a result of Jay Electronica meeting American rapper Jay-Z by chance at a birthday celebration for Atlantic Records COO Julie Greenwald at The Spotted Pig. The meeting was followed by "weeks of intense daily communication and creative courtship" related to Jay-Z wanting to sign Jay Electronica to his record label Roc Nation. According to American journalist Miss Info, Jay Electronica knew Jay-Z was serious when he attached a recorded verse to his second reply email. "Shiny Suit Theory" is the second movement of a two-part song, with the first movement being titled "Dinner at Tiffanys". "Dinner at Tiffanys" was composed by British singer-songwriter The Bullitts, who worked on the movement's strings. English-French actress Charlotte Gainsbourg had a guest appearance on the movement, though Jay Electronica initially wanted English actress Julie Andrews. Both "Dinner at Tiffany's" and "Shiny Suit Theory" were listed together as one piece on the album's 2012 track list.

American rapper Big Sean's 2013 song "Control" was originally meant to be on Jay Electronica's album, but it was eventually given to Sean, who wanted it on his sophomore studio album Hall of Fame but couldn't clear the sample in time. However, Big Sean instead released the song as a promotional single after American rapper Kendrick Lamar recorded his controversial verse for it.

== Release and promotion ==
The album was originally announced in 2007, but was delayed several times. Jay Electronica claimed that Act II: Patents of Nobility (the Turn) was finished in 2011, then later revealed the track listing in July 2012. The album never released and was delayed indefinitely. On October 4, 2020, almost 11 years after its originally announced release date, it leaked online after a group of internet users on Discord raised $9,000 to purchase it from a hacker. Shortly after the leak, Jay Electronica went to his Twitter and Instagram to acknowledge the leak and thanked his fans for the warm response to the album. In a series of now-deleted tweets, Jay Electronica said they would try to clear the samples, then get it on Tidal as soon as possible. The following day, Jay Electronica posted a link on his Twitter page to the official Tidal release.

On October 28, 2020, the album was taken down from Tidal for unknown reasons. A month later, Jay Electronica revealed in his Discord server that the finished version of Act II has unreleased verses from Kanye West and that he would try to get them cleared before re-releasing the album. However the 2025 re-release lacked West's verses.

=== Singles ===
In July 2010, Jay Electronica posted a video to his YouTube channel titled "Act II: Ruff Songs that didnt make the final cut." which had an early version of the song "Life On Mars" also known as "@FatBellyBella", the title is in reference to his and Erykah Badu's daughter Mars Merkaba. In November 2010, Jay Electronica released the song "Shiny Suit Theory" featuring Jay-Z and The-Dream. The song was later included on A Written Testimony. Jay Electronica released the songs "Better in Tune With the Infinite" featuring LaTonya Givens in March 2014 and "Road To Perdition" featuring sampled vocals from Jay-Z in March 2015. In June 2017, he released "Letter to Falon", produced by English musician Paul Epworth, after being inspired by American basketball player Kevin Durant's performance at the 2017 NBA Finals.

=== Controversy ===
On 12 July 2020, British radio station Rinse FM broadcast the track "Better in Tune With the Infinite", after which a listener complained that the lyrics contained antisemitic hate speech. Following an investigation, British media regulator Ofcom found Rinse FM to be in breach of three rules of its broadcasting code, concluding that "the track contained antisemitic hate speech, abusive, derogatory and potentially offensive lyrics which were not justified by the context". Ofcom also stated that the breaches were serious enough to be considered for a statutory sanction of Rinse FM.

== Critical reception ==
Professional ratings
Review scores
Source	Rating
Pitchfork	8.7/10

Pitchfork lauded the record, awarding it "Best New Music", with Matthew Ismael Ruiz writing "even slightly unfinished, it is nearly an all-time classic, the kind of record that celebrates an art form while simultaneously pushing it forward." Pitchfork rated the album an 8.7 out of 10, and later included Act II on their best albums of 2020 list at number 14. Craig Jenkins of Vulture said "Act II foregrounds Jay Electronica’s words in a way that sticks out among major-label hip-hop releases then as now, front-loading the project with intricate, personal storytelling exercises most artists might relegate to a late-album interlude." In a less positive review, Paul Thompson in GQ stated "Act II is strange—the third song is, simply, the audio from a Dick Tracy Two-Way Wrist Radio commercial laid over music—and in spots rewarding. But it must be said that few of its songs rank among Jay Electronica's best."

== Track listing ==
Act II: Patents of Nobility (The Turn)
No.	Title	Writer(s)	Producer(s)	Length
1.	"Real Magic"	Elpadaro Allah		3:09
2.	"New Illuminati"	Allah		1:31
3.	"Patents of Nobility"			1:14
4.	"Life on Mars"	Allah		1:41
5.	"Bonnie and Clyde"	Allah; Serge Gainsbourg	Jay Electronica	4:35
6.	"Dinner at Tiffany's" (featuring Charlotte Gainsbourg)	Jeymes Samuel	The Bullitts	3:04
7.	"Shiny Suit Theory" (featuring Jay-Z and The-Dream)	Allah; Shawn Carter; Terius Nash; Barbara Mason	Jay Electronica	3:43
8.	"Memories & Merlot"	Allah	Rich Kidd	2:39
9.	"Better in Tune" (featuring LaTonya Givens)	Allah; Ryuichi Sakamoto; Jacques Morelenbaum; Everton Nelson; Gustavo Santaolalla		4:39
10.	"Letter to Falon"	Allah	Jay Electronica; The Bullitts; Paul Epworth	3:54
11.	"Road to Perdition"	Allah	DJ Khalil	3:32
12.	"Welcome to Knightsbridge"	Allah		3:28
13.	"Rough Love"	Allah		2:38
14.	"Nights of the Roundtable"	Allah		3:55
15.	"Run & Hide" (featuring The Bullitts)	Allah; Samuel	Jay Electronica; The Bullitts	4:37
16.	"10,000 Lotus Petals"	Samuel	The Bullitts	3:48
Total length:				52:07

=== Notes ===
- The 2025 re-release omits "Better in Tune" and "10,000 Lotus Petals".
- "Real Magic" contains excerpts of a speech by Ronald Reagan and additional vocals by LaTonya Givens.
- "Life on Mars" is addressed to "@fatbellybella", Erykah Badu's Twitter handle.
- "Welcome to Knightsbridge" contains dialogue by P. Diddy.
- "Nights of the Roundtable" contains dialogue by Jay-Z.

==== Sample credits ====
- "Real Magic" contains a sample of "R.S.V.P." by Nat Adderley.
- "New Illuminati" contains an interpolation of "The What" by The Notorious B.I.G. and Method Man.
- "Patents of Nobility" contains a sample of "The Court of the Crimson King" by King Crimson.
- "Life on Mars" contains a sample of "Aeroplane (Reprise)" by Wee.
- "Bonnie and Clyde" contains a sample of "Bonnie and Clyde" by Serge Gainsbourg and Brigitte Bardot, and an interpolation of "Shadowboxin'" by GZA and Method Man.
- "The Shiny Suit Theory" contains a sample of "Ain't Got the Love of One Girl (On My Mind)" by The Ambassadors.
- "Better in Tune With the Infinite" contains a sample of "Bibo no Aozora/04" by Ryuichi Sakamoto.
- "Road to Perdition" contains a sample of "Success" by Jay-Z featuring Nas.
- "Rough Love" contains a sample of "Soul Chicken" by Bobby Allen & the Exceptions.
- "Nights of the Roundtable" contains a sample and interpolations of "Faust" by Bill Finley.
- "Run and Hide" contains a sample of "Quicksand" by David Bowie.
