= Act III =

Act III may refer to:

== Companies, publications and brands ==
- Act III Broadcasting, a defunct American television broadcasting company
- Act III Theatres, an American movie theater chain acquired in 1998 by Regal Entertainment Group
- Act III Publishing, a defunct American Trade Magazine publisher active 1985-1991
- Act III Communications, an American media and communications company
- Wyeth Act-3, a drug composed of 'ibuprofen'; see Ibuprofen brand names
- LGP-30#ACT-III_programming_language, Librascope ACT-III programming language

== Music ==
- Act III (Death Angel album), 1990
- Act III (the Seldom Scene album), 1973
- Act III: Life and Death, an album by the Dear Hunter, 2009
- Act Three (G4 album), an album by G4, 2006
- Act III: This City Made Us, an album by the Protomen, 2026
- Act III (Kasabian album), an album by Kasabian, 2026
- Act. 3 Chococo Factory, 2017 single album by Gugudan
- Act III: M.O.T.T.E World Tour, 2017 concert tour

== See also ==
- Act (drama), a division or unit of a drama
- Act II (disambiguation)
