= Poo Bear Presents Bearthday Music =

Studio album by Poo Bear
- Released: April 27, 2018
- Genre: Pop R&B
- Length: 47:11
- Label: Capitol; Universal
- Producer: Poo Bear (exec.); A.C; Ben Billions; Billboard; Boi-1da; Dan Kanter; Ebonikz; Gemini Muziq; Illmind; Juanes; Kid Culture; Nineteen85; Roget Chahayed; Sasha Sirota; Sinh; Skrillex; Sky; Soundz; The Audibles; Virtual Riot

Singles from Poo Bear Presents Bearthday Music
- 1. "Will I See You" Released: September 3, 2017; 2. "All We Can Do" Released: November 17, 2017; 3. "Hard 2 Face Reality" Released: April 6, 2018; 4. "Perdido" Released: April 20, 2018

Poo Bear Presents Bearthday Music, also titled Bearthday Music, is the debut studio album by American record producer Poo Bear. Featuring collaborators such as Justin Bieber, Zara Larsson, Jennifer Lopez and Anitta, it was released on April 27, 2018.

Consisting of 15 songs, the album includes the lead single "Hard 2 Face Reality" which is a collaboration with pop singer Justin Bieber and hip hop artist Jay Electronica. "Will I See You" featuring Anitta was previously released as the bilingual first single in September 2017. The album's pre-sale began on April 6, 2018.

== Track listing ==
Credits adapted from Tidal.

No.	Title	Writer(s)	Producer(s)	Length
1.	"Hard 2 Face Reality" (featuring Justin Bieber and Jay Electronica)	Kenneth Coby; Dan Kanter; Justin Bieber; Jason "Poo Bear" Boyd; Theodore Thedford	Soundz; Kanter; Boyd	3:16
2.	"Put Your Lovin Where Your Mouth Is" (featuring Jennifer Lopez)	Boyd; Jimmy Giannos; Dominic Jordan	The Audibles; Boyd	3:26
3.	"Perdido" (featuring J Balvin)	Valentin Brunn; Alejandro Ramirez; Boyd; Sonny Moore; José Álvaro Osorio Balvin	Skrillex; Virtual Riot; Sky; Boyd	2:45
4.	"Will I See You" (featuring Anitta)	Larissa de Macedo Machado; Boyd; Youri Ter Stege; Elijah Scott	Sinh; Ebonikz; Boyd	3:31
5.	"All We Can Do" (with Juanes)	Rogét Chahayed; Boyd; Juan Esteban Aristizábal Vásquez; Moore	Skrillex; Juanes; Chahayed; Boyd	3:24
6.	"Shade" (featuring Elvana)	Ramirez; Boyd; Elvana Gjata	Sky; Boyd	3:00
7.	"Inevitable" (featuring Sasha Sirota)	Sasha Sirota; Giannos; Jordan; Boyd	The Audibles; Sirota; Boyd	3:38
8.	"Either" (featuring Zara Larsson)	Mathieu Jomphe; Saul Alexander Castillo Vasquez; Boyd; Jacob Kasher Hindlin	A.C; Billboard; Boyd	3:07
9.	"From Here" (featuring Nikki Vianna and LAZR)	Jordan; Giannos; Nicole Spirito; Boyd	The Audibles; Boyd	3:07
10.	"That Shit Go" (featuring Ty Dolla Sign)	Khaled Khaled; Ben Diehl; Hindlin; Boyd	Ben Billions	2:15
11.	"Moves" (featuring Nechie)	Boyd; Matthew Samuels; Ramon Ibanga Jr.; Cerron Lee	Boi-1da; Illmind	2:12
12.	"Vegas" (featuring LAZR)	Hindlin; Jordan; Boyd; Giannos; Steven Tolson	The Audibles; Boyd	3:33
13.	"On My Kids" (featuring RaRa)	Rodriguez Smith; Boyd; Daniel Hackett	Kid Culture	3:44
14.	"Blessing and a Curse" (featuring Ashley Joi)	Boyd; Hagay Mizrahi; Ashley Boyd	Gemini Muziq; Boyd	2:46
15.	"Early or Late"	Boyd; Paul Jefferies	Nineteen85	3:26
Total length:				47:11
