= Act Too Group =

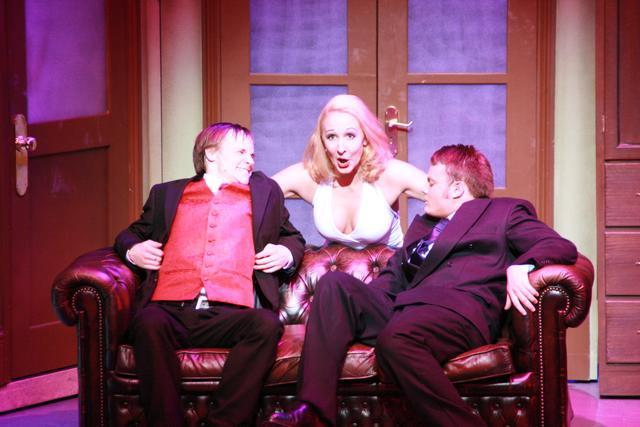
The Act Too Group UK/European Amateur Première of The Producers Website: https://acttoo.co.uk

The Act Too Group is a Mid-Sussex based amateur theatre company who produced the first amateur European production of Mel Brooks' musical The Producers.

== History ==
The group was founded in 1991.

The group also produced one of 8 limited release amateur runs of The Witches of Eastwick prior to general release, winning them their second NODA award following Copacabana in 2006. They followed this up with a third in 2007 with their production of We Will Rock You.

In 2009 the company was invited to perform at the NODA presidential inauguration ceremony in Leicester.

In November 2014 the company put on Avenue Q. In February 2024, the Haywards Heath academy staged "Matilda Jr", and in May 2026, they staged Frozen Jr.

== Awards ==
- NODA Area Councillors Accolades of Excellence for Copacabana (2006), We Will Rock You (2007), and The Witches of Eastwick
