= Barbara Nicolosi =

American screenwriter

- Born: February 20, 1964 (age 61); New Brunswick, New Jersey, U.S.
- Occupation(s): American screenwriter, script consultant, university professor

Barbara Nicolosi (born February 20, 1964) is an American screenwriter, script consultant and university professor of cinema and Great Books.

== Early life and education ==
Nicolosi was born in New Brunswick, New Jersey, to Anthony and Hilda Nicolosi. She is the second of four daughters. Her youngest sister is the professional opera singer Valerie Nicolosi. When Barbara was five years old, the family moved to Newport, Rhode Island, where her father took a job as the archivist for the Naval War College. Anthony Nicolosi would go on to found the Naval War College Museum. She has a B.A. from the Great Books program at The College of Saint Mary Magdalen, a master's degree in Radio/TV/Film from Northwestern University and a PhD in Creative Writing from Bath Spa University in Bath, UK.

== Career ==
She won Catholic Press Awards for her media columns in 2002 and 2004. One of her columns was selected for the 2006 Loyola Press release, The Best Catholic Writing of 2005.

In 2015, Nicolosi accepted a position at Azusa Pacific University as an associate professor in the newly formed Honors College. In 2019 she started a position as associate professor and Director of Screenwriting Programs at Regent University.

From 2014 to 2019, Nicolosi ran Catharsis: The Story Lab, a mentorship and out-sourced development program for visual storytellers. She is founder and Chair Emeritus She was also a founding partner in Origin Entertainment. She is a member of the Writers Guild of America, West.

== Filmography ==
- Mary Mother of Christ (2013) — co-writer
- A Severe Mercy (development) - Writer
- Fatima (released in 2020) — Writer
- Cosmic Origins (2011) - Executive Producer
- In Memory (short film) - Executive Producer
- Ask J (web series, 2015) - Executive Producer
- Judgmental Moose (web series, 2015) Executive Producer

== Television ==
- Faith Under Fire - Herself (1 episode, 2005)
- Culture Wars (2005) TV episode – Herself
- Saving Grace - theological consultant
- Rated "R": Republicans in Hollywood (2004) (TV) - Herself - interviewee
