= Control (Big Sean song) =

2013 single by Big Sean, Kendrick Lamar and Jay Electronica

Promotional single by Big Sean featuring Kendrick Lamar and Jay Electronica
- Released: August 14, 2013
- Recorded: 2013
- Genre: Hip hop
- Length: 7:32
- Label: GOOD; Def Jam
- Songwriters: Sean Anderson; Kendrick Duckworth; Timothy Thedford; Dion Wilson
- Producer: No I.D.

"Control" is a song by American rapper Big Sean, featuring fellow American rappers Kendrick Lamar and Jay Electronica. It entered US mainstream urban radio on August 14, 2013, via GOOD Music and Def Jam Recordings, as a promotional single. It was originally meant for Electronica's planned studio album Act II: The Patents of Nobility (The Turn) (2020), but it was later given to Big Sean for his second studio album Hall of Fame (2013). It was ultimately cut from that album due to sample clearance issues.

Written by all three artists and its producer No I.D., "Control" contains samples such as "Where I'm From" (1997) by Jay-Z, "El pueblo unido jamás será vencido" (1974) by Quilapayún and Sergio Ortega, and an interpolation of "Get Bizy" (2011) by Terrace Martin. Receiving widespread critical acclaim from music critics and media scrutiny, Lamar's performance in particular was lauded as a "wake-up call" for the hip hop industry. Lamar's Twitter account and Wikipedia article received increased internet traffic as a direct result of the release of the track.

== Release ==
Def Jam Recordings serviced "Control" to American mainstream urban radio on August 14, 2013, while a release to urban contemporary radio followed on August 27. It peaked at number 11 on the United States Billboard Bubbling Under Hot 100 Singles chart and at number 43 on the Billboard Hot R&B/Hip-Hop Songs chart.

== Reception and impact ==
Upon release, "Control" received rave reviews from music critics; much of the acclaim was focused on Lamar's performance. Rob Kenner of Complex, who named the track the tenth-greatest song of 2013, wrote, "No matter which verse you prefer it's hard to deny that "Control" will go down in history as a milestone in hip-hop, and easily ranks as one of 2013's most important records." The publication also named Lamar's appearance as the best rap verse of the year. Rolling Stone also dubbed Lamar's performance as the best rap verse of the year, and named "Control" the thirteenth best song of 2013. NME ranked the song at number 41 on their list of the 50 best songs of the year, while XXL named it one of the top five hip hop songs of 2013. Pitchfork Media positioned the song at number 73 on their list of the 100 best songs of 2013.

=== Media coverage ===
Although Lamar's verse was universally acclaimed, it was also met with persistent media scrutiny. During his performance, he called out 11 rappers by name—J. Cole, Meek Mill, Drake, Big K.R.I.T., Wale, Pusha T, ASAP Rocky, Tyler, the Creator, Mac Miller, Big Sean and Jay Electronica—and exclaims: "I got love for you all but I'm trying to murder you niggas / Trying to make sure your core fans never heard of you niggas / They don't want to hear not one more noun or verb from you niggas." He also proclaims himself as the "King of New York" and "King of the Coast", sparking criticism from several New York-based rappers. Lamar's Twitter account saw a 510% increase in followers in the week following the track's release, while his Wikipedia page garnered 200,000 page views.

According to media outlets, "Control" entered Lamar in feuds between Drake and Big Sean. In an interview with Billboard, Drake was apathetic to Lamar's verse: "I didn't really have anything to say about it. It just sounded like an ambitious thought to me. That's all it was. I know good and well that [Lamar]'s not murdering me, at all, in any platform. So when that day presents itself, I guess we can revisit the topic." He later disapproved of "Control" during an interview with Pitchfork. Big Sean initially praised "Control", but later said that it contained "a lot of negativity". While performing at a cypher at the 2013 BET Hip Hop Awards, Lamar rapped: "Yeah, and nothing's been the same since they dropped 'Control' / And tucked a sensitive rapper back in his pajama clothes." Media outlets have speculated that Lamar, Drake, and Big Sean have been exchanging disses to each other through their music; although rumors were repeatedly denied until the Drake–Kendrick Lamar feud in 2024.

==== Response tracks ====
Several rappers, regardless if they were mentioned on "Control", released songs responding to Lamar's verse or a diss track in the weeks following the song's release. Many of the responses were labeled as "Kendrick Lamar Response" or "Control Response". According to Lamar, the best responses came from King Los, Joell Ortiz, Joe Budden and Kevin Hart's hip hop pseudonym Chocolate Droppa. He found Papoose's response to be the "comical joint". In a retrospective analysis, Rolling Stone dubbed "Control" as the modern Roxanne Wars.

== Charts ==
Chart (2013)	Peak position
US Bubbling Under Hot 100 (Billboard)	11
US Hot R&B/Hip-Hop Songs (Billboard)	43
