= Islam and hip-hop in the United States =

A number of hip hop artists in the United States are followers of Islam.

== 1980s ==
The teachings of the Five-Percent Nation were significantly influential for prominent Islamic hip hop artists like Big Daddy Kane and Rakim. Founded in Harlem in the 1960s, the Five-Percent Nation was created by Clarence 13X, a former member of the Nation of Islam (NOI). Five Percenter teachings popularized many expressions to hip-hop and hip-hop culture such as "dropping science", "What up God," and "word is bond".

Rakim (born William Griffin) was one of the earliest hip-hop artists to incorporate references to Islam into their work. He later became a Five Percenter, adopting the name Rakim-allah. Big Daddy Kane is also a Five-Percenter, having been introduced to the movement in high school. In his song "Just Rhymin' with Biz" (with Biz Markie), he states that the "Kane" in his name stands for "King Asiatic, Nobody's Equal," an allusion to the Five-Percent Nation's teaching that the original man was an Asiatic Black man. His other works also contain references to Islam and other Five Percent Nation teachings; for example, the final verse of Kane's 1988 hit "Ain't No Half-Steppin'" explicitly conveys his connection to Islam: "Hold up the peace sign, as salaam alaikum!" Later, his 1989 song "Mortal Combat" referenced the Supreme Mathematics. Kane also samples a Louis Farrakhan speech in his 1989 song "Young, Gifted, and Black". In his song "Beginning to end, from Knowledge to Born", Kane references Supreme Mathematics.

Lakim Shabazz was an MC during the 1980s who derived his name from the Tribe of Shabazz. Lakim Shabazz was influenced by Islam, specifically the teachings of the Five Percent Nation, as reflected in his rap, such as in the song "Black is Back". The song encourages African-Americans to recognize their greatness and fight for freedom, justice and equality, as emphasized in the lyrics: "You say it's gonna be hard, but I'm with God, I got the proof and truth, and now it's time to get loose."

Hip hop producer Afrika Islam trained extensively under Afrika Bambaataa for several years, and both worked extensively with the Zulu Nation, an organization originally developed to use hip hop to stop violence and spread peace. As time passed, the Zulu Nation drew increasingly heavily from the Nation of Islam's teachings, sharing the organization's principles with its members.

== 1990s ==
The early 1990s saw the development of more politically charged, afrocentric, and militant hip hop; references to Islam became more explicit, typically paired with calls for political and social justice. Nation of Islam leader Louis Farrakhan was praised by artists like Public Enemy, while albums by Wu-Tang Clan and Busta Rhymes referenced the Five-Percent Nation.

Ice Cube was born in Los Angeles, and became best known as a member and key lyricist of Compton-based group Niggaz With Attitude (N.W.A), notably writing the group's track "Straight Outta Compton" in 1988. His solo debut, AmeriKKKa's Most Wanted, touched on social issues like poverty, racism, drug addiction, and general critiques of American society. In the early 1990s, Ice Cube converted to Islam. When asked about his faith he stated, "I mean, what I call myself is a natural Muslim, because it's just me and God." On his 1991 album Death Certificate, Ice Cube samples excerpts of a speech made by Khalid Abdul Muhammad.

Mos Def (real name Dante Smith) was born in Brooklyn; his father was a member of Nation of Islam, and he became a part of the community of Imam Warith Deen Mohammed, son of Elijah Muhammad, the group's founder. "I got my first exposure to Islam when I was 13," he said. "My dad taught me how to make wudhu", the ritual ablution Muslims perform before prayer. At 19 he took the shahada, the Muslim declaration of faith. He formed a group with his siblings called Urban Thermo Dynamics before launching a solo career, and then became part of a hip hop collective with the Jungle Brothers and A Tribe Called Quest called the Native Tongues. He later began working with Talib Kweli as Blackstar, and his music took a sociopolitical turn. In 1999 he released his solo debut album Black on Both Sides. The first words spoken on this album were "Bismillah ar-Rahman ar-Raheem", translating to "In the name of God, the most gracious, the most merciful."

Q-Tip (real name: Jonathan Davis) was born in Harlem in 1970, and grew up in Queens, where he went to school with Ali Shaheed Muhammad, Phife Dawg, and Jarobi White, with whom he formed the group A Tribe Called Quest. Their debut album People's Instinctive Travels and the Paths of Rhythm was released in 1990. Davis converted to Islam in 1994 and changed his name to Kamaal Ibn John Fareed. Before converting he had been agnostic. Kamaal released his debut solo album in 1999. His colleague in A Tribe Called Quest, Ali Shaheed Muhammad, is also a devout Muslim. His debut solo album Shaheedullah and Stereotypes was released in 2004.

=== Hip-Hop Minister Conrad Tillard ===
Nation of Islam Minister Conrad Tillard became known as the "Hip-Hop Minister", as he both criticized hip hop lyrics, and defused potentially violent feuds between rappers. He appears in the documentary Hip-Hop: Beyond Beats and Rhymes. In the 1990s and early 2000s, Tillard was an outspoken critic of hip hop lyrics that he perceived as degrading and dangerous to the black community, saying such lyrics suggested "that we are penny-chasing, Champagne-drinking, gold-teeth-wearing, modern-day Sambos, pimps and players." He argued that in seeking to emulate the lyrics in gangsta rap, young Black Americans became victims of mass incarceration, violence, sexual exploitation, and drug crime.

In the 1990s, Tillard started an organization called A Movement for C.H.H.A.N.G.E. ("Conscious Hip Hop Activism Necessary for Global Empowerment"), to advocate for "conscious hip hop activism", voter registration and education, community organizing, and social empowerment for black youth. He criticized hip-hop lyrics that portrayed black communities in the United States as degenerate. He also criticized the businessmen who supported that approach. He feuded with Def Jam founder Russell Simmons in 2001, accusing him of stoking violence by allowing the frequent use of words such as "nigga" and "bitch" in rap lyrics.

Tillard arranged a meeting and a truce in a feud between rising bands Wreckx-N-Effect and A Tribe Called Quest. He also counseled Sean "Diddy" Combs during his feud with rival Suge Knight, and criticized him for what he saw as his mistreatment of Shyne Barrow.

After the drive-by shooting murder of rapper Tupac Shakur in 1996, Tillard organized a "Day of Atonement" event to oppose violent themes in hip-hop music, promote unity, and celebrate Shakur's life. He invited artists including A Tribe Called Quest, The Notorious B.I.G., Chuck D with Public Enemy, Kool Herc, and Afrika Bambaataa, model Bethann Hardison, actor Malik Yoba, and Bad Boy Records president Sean Combs. There were an estimated 2,000 attendees.

Tillard also criticized the Reverend Al Sharpton and other civil rights leaders, calling them "hired guns" for not condemning rappers Sean Combs or Shyne Barrows. Tillard organized another summit at the Adam Clayton Powell Jr. State Office Building in Harlem on 125th Street, focused on what he perceived as negative imagery in hip hop. Def Jam Recordings founder Russell Simmons organized a counter-summit, urging the public not to support "open and aggressive critics of the hip-hop community".

== 2000s ==
Freeway converted to Islam when he was 14 years old, and has said Islam is "my core, it's my soul, it's my everything". Beanie Sigel converted to Islam early in his life and came to the faith through his knowledge of the Five-Percent Nation. His lyrics contain frequent references and allusions to his faith, including the conflicting values of his communities. Bay Area rapper The Jacka also rapped about his Muslim faith.

Some hip-hop artists of this period were raised as Muslims abroad before moving to the United States, including Akon (raised in Senegal), French Montana (Morocco), and Sheck Wes (Senegal). The latter's hit "Mo Bamba" was inspired by a Tijani Saint.
