= Hard 2 Face Reality =

Single by Poo Bear featuring Justin Bieber and Jay Electronica

from the album Poo Bear Presents Bearthday Music
- Released: April 6, 2018
- Recorded: 2014, 2017
- Genre: R&B; EDM
- Length: 3:16
- Label: Bearthday
- Songwriters: Jason Boyd; Justin Bieber; Elpadaro Allah; Dan Kanter; Kenneth Coby
- Producers: Poo Bear; Kanter

Poo Bear singles chronology
"Will I See You" (2017)	"Hard 2 Face Reality" (2018)	"Perdido" (2018)

Justin Bieber singles chronology
"Friends" (2017)	"Hard 2 Face Reality" (2018)	"No Brainer" (2018)

Jay Electronica singles chronology
"Letter to Falon" (2017)	"Hard 2 Face Reality" (2018)	"Essential" (2019)

Audio video
- "Hard 2 Face Reality" on YouTube

"Hard 2 Face Reality" is a song recorded by American record producer Poo Bear, featuring vocals from Canadian singer Justin Bieber and American rapper Jay Electronica. The three artists wrote the song with Dan Kanter and Kenneth Coby, the former of which produced the song with Poo Bear. It was released on April 6, 2018, as the lead single from Poo Bear's debut studio album, Poo Bear Presents Bearthday Music.

== Background ==
The song was written back in late 2013 to early 2014, during the time where Justin Bieber had been accused by the media of several things, run-ins with the law, and his Florida arrest in January 2014. Later that year, Bieber released a demo of the song on SoundCloud on April 27, though it was never released to mainstream music for unknown reasons. At the time, the song only featured Poo Bear on it. The song remained on SoundCloud until November 2017, when it was then removed. On February 4, 2018, Poo Bear told interviewer Ebro Darden during a Beats 1 radio show that he would release the song later in the month.

== Credits and personnel ==
Credits adapted from Tidal.

Performers

- Poo Bear – composition, production
- Justin Bieber – composition
- Jay Electronica – composition

Addition musicians

- Kenneth Coby – composition
- Dan Kanter – composition, production

Studio personnel

- Colin Leonard – master engineering
- Josh Gudwin – mixing

== Charts ==
Chart (2018)	Peak position
Austria (Ö3 Austria Top 40)	71
Canada Hot 100 (Billboard)	78
Czech Republic Singles Digital (ČNS IFPI)	73
Denmark (Tracklisten)	23
Netherlands (Single Top 100)	70
New Zealand Heatseekers (RMNZ)	5
Norway (VG-lista)	28
Slovakia Singles Digital (ČNS IFPI)	88
Sweden (Sverigetopplistan)	59
Switzerland (Schweizer Hitparade)	88
US Bubbling Under Hot 100 (Billboard)	6

== Certifications ==
Region	Certification	Certified units/sales
Brazil (Pro-Música Brasil)	2× Platinum	80,000^{‡}
Denmark (IFPI Danmark)	Gold	45,000^{‡}
New Zealand (RMNZ)	Gold	15,000^{‡}
^{‡} Sales+streaming figures based on certification alone.

== Release history ==
Region	Date	Format	Label	Ref.
Worldwide	April 6, 2018	Digital download	Breathday	
Italy	April 20, 2018	Contemporary hit radio	Universal	
