= Jay Electronica =

American rapper and record producer (born 1976)

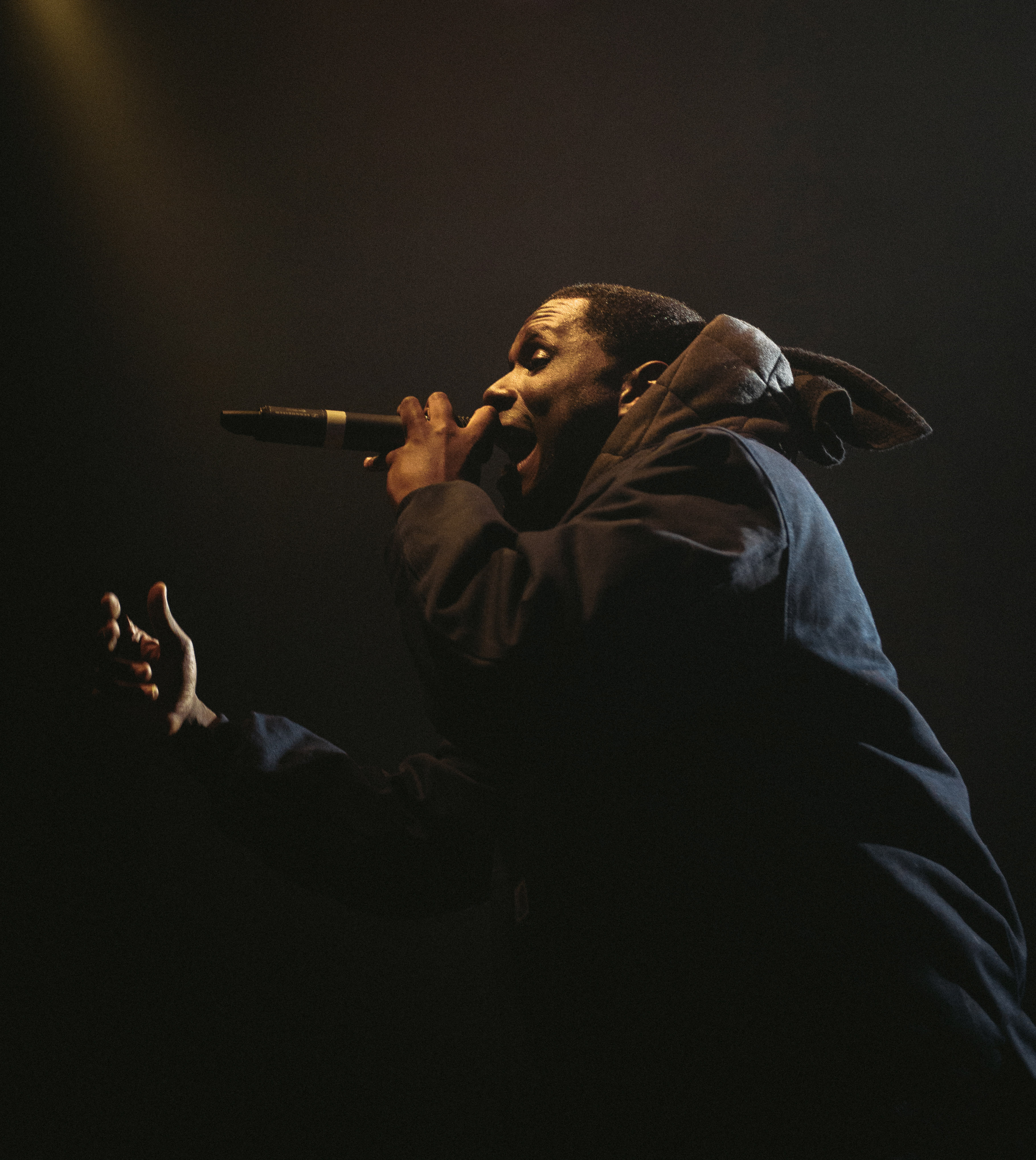
- Jay Electronica performing in 2014
- Born: Timothy Elpadaro Thedford; September 19, 1976 (age 50); New Orleans, Louisiana, U.S.
- Other names: Elpadaro F. Electronica Allah; Je'Ri
- Occupations: Rapper; singer; songwriter; record producer
- Years active: 2000–present
- Works: Discography; production
- Partner: Erykah Badu (2004–2009)
- Children: 1
- Musical career
- Genre: Conscious hip-hop
- Labels: The Dogon Society; Decon; Roc Nation; Equity
- Website: jayelectronica.org

Elpadaro F. Electronica Allah (born Timothy Elpadaro Thedford; September 19, 1976), known professionally as Jay Electronica (stylized as J A Y E L E C T R O N I C A), is an American rapper, singer, songwriter, and record producer. Born and raised in New Orleans, he first saw recognition with his single "Exhibit C" (2009), which led fellow American rapper Jay-Z to sign Electronica to his Roc Nation label following a multi-label bidding war in 2010.

His debut studio album, A Written Testimony (2020), was met with critical acclaim and entered the Billboard 200 at number 12, alongside peaking within the top 10 of the Top R&B/Hip-Hop Albums chart, specifically at number 8; it was followed by his second studio album, Act II: The Patents of Nobility (The Turn) (2020) in October of that same year, although it was originally recorded from 2010 to 2012. His guest appearance on fellow Jay-Z protégé Kanye West's 2021 song, "Jesus Lord", marked his first entry on the Billboard Hot 100, peaking at number 26 on the chart.

In 2025, he re-released Act I: Eternal Sunshine (The Pledge) and Act II: The Patents of Nobility (The Turn). These re-releases were followed by three mini-albums, A Written Testimony: Leaflets, A Written Testimony: Power at the Rate of My Dreams, and A Written Testimony: Mars, the Inhabited Planet. Throughout his career, he has collaborated with artists such as Justin Bieber, J. Cole, Mos Def, Big Sean, Kendrick Lamar, Kanye West, Travis Scott, Mac Miller, Common, The Game, MF Doom, Chance the Rapper, and Vince Staples, alongside others. He also produced the opening track to Nas' untitled studio album (2008). He was in a relationship with fellow American musician Erykah Badu for five years.

== Career ==
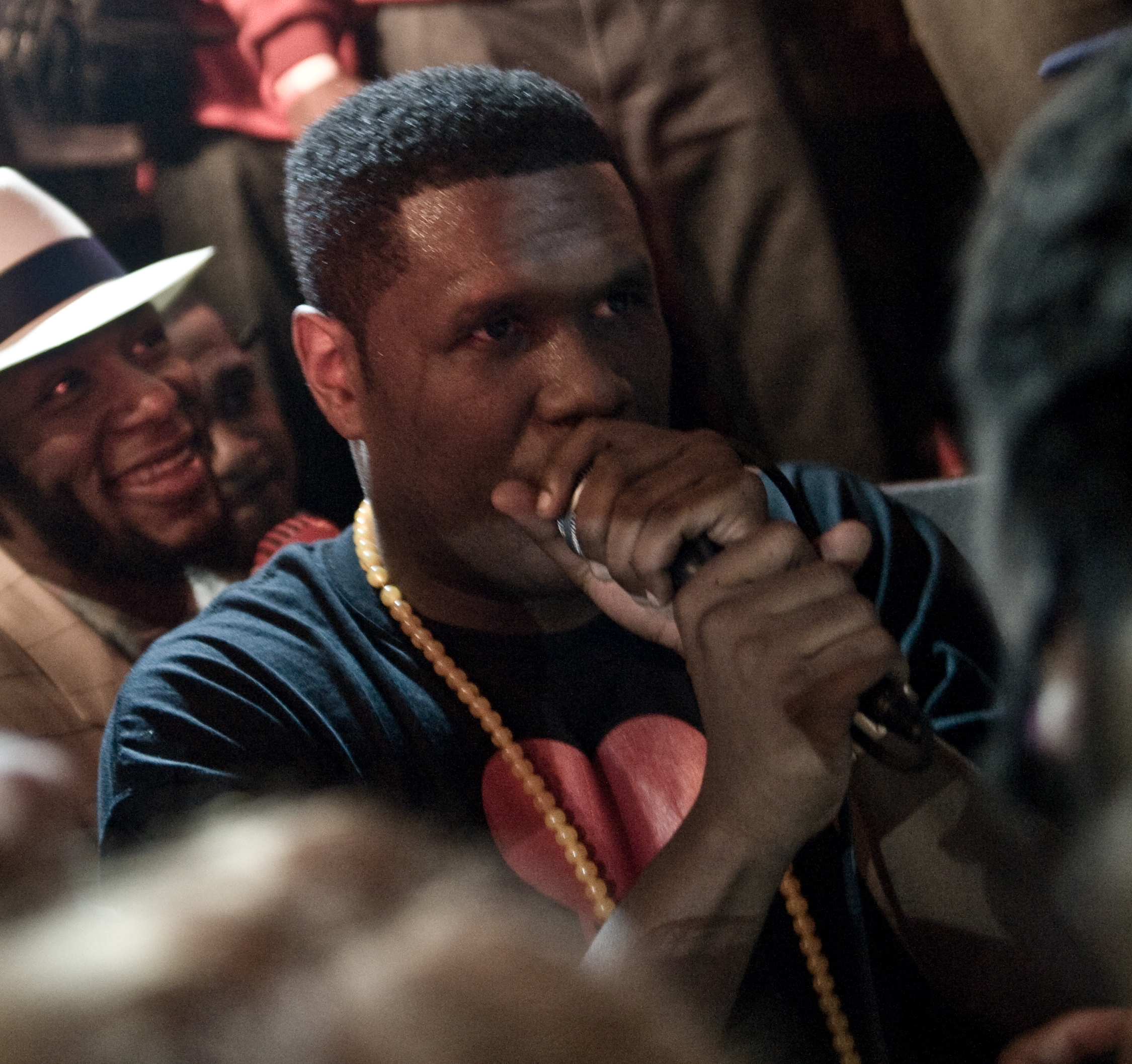
Jay Electronica performing in 2010

=== 2000; 2007–2020: Beginnings, Act I: Eternal Sunshine (The Pledge), and collaborations ===
Before he was known as "Jay Electronica", he released his debut mixtape, The Awakening, in 2000, as "Je'Ri Allah". Seven years later, in 2007, he released his first mixtape as "Jay Electronica", Act I: Eternal Sunshine (The Pledge), via Myspace. It was downloaded over 50,000 times within its first month. That success and his catalog led to Electronica joining the Rock the Bells Tour in 2008, performing with fellow artists B.o.B, Wale, Santigold, and Tyga, alongside others. Later that year, producer Just Blaze and Jay Electronica selected songs for Guitar Center's GAIN project, Fresh Cuts Vol. 3, and included a previously unnamed song, which Just Blaze named "Exhibit A (Transformations)". The song would later be released as Electronica's debut single in 2009.

Just Blaze would later debut Electronica's second single, "Exhibit C", on Tony Touch's Sirius Radio program on October 27, 2009, where it quickly caught on, making its way to terrestrial radio stations like New York's Hot 97 and spawning artist remixes from fellow American rappers, such as B.o.B, Childish Gambino, The Game, Lil B, and Twista, alongside others. Due to the song's hype, a bidding war ensued with Jay finally signing with Roc Nation on November 12, 2010. Though fans and critics anticipated a full-length debut, Electronica's output in the subsequent decade consisted of several collaborations and non-album solo songs, including a feature on Big Sean and Kendrick Lamar's "Control" and a guest appearance on Poo Bear and Justin Bieber's "Hard 2 Face Reality". He also released his third single, "Shiny Suit Theory", for a sequel to his debut mixtape, although it would be temporarily shelved by 2012.

=== 2020–2021: A Written Testimony and Act II: The Patents of Nobility (The Turn) ===
On February 7, 2020, Jay Electronica announced the completion of his album, A Written Testimony, which was recorded over 40 days. It was released on March 13, 2020, and was both critically and commercially successful, charting at number 12 on the Billboard 200 and peaking at number 8 on the Top R&B/Hip-Hop Albums chart. It also charted in Australia, Belgium, Canada, Switzerland, and the United Kingdom. The track "The Blinding" (featuring Travis Scott) would also chart, peaking at number 9 of the Billboard Bubbling Under Hot 100 Singles chart. In 2021, the album was nominated for Best Rap Album at the 63rd Annual Grammy Awards, but lost to Nas' King's Disease (2020).

On October 5, 2020, Jay Electronica released the sequel to his debut mixtape, Act II: The Patents of Nobility (The Turn), as his second studio album, after the album had leaked online two days prior. In August 2021, Jay Electronica guest featured on the song "Jesus Lord" released on Kanye West's twelfth studio album, Donda (2021). The song would be his very first entry on the Billboard Hot 100, peaking at number 26 on the chart. Electronica would also appear on the song's sequel, "Jesus Lord, Pt. 2", alongside The Lox.

=== 2025–present: September rollout ===
On September 17, 2025, Jay Electronica reissued his debut mixtape, Act I: Eternal Sunshine (The Pledge), to streaming services. The following day, he released Act II: The Patents of Nobility (The Turn) to streaming services. On September 19, he released his first mini-album, A Written Testimony: Leaflets, followed by a second titled A Written Testimony: Power at the Rate of My Dreams, and his third mini-album, A Written Testimony: Mars, the Inhabited Planet on September 21. The latter album was followed by a bonus track, "...Shine for Me" (featuring Kelly Moonstone).

== Personal life ==
Jay Electronica and Erykah Badu were in a relationship for five years and have a daughter together, Mars Merkaba Thedford, who was born in 2009. Jay Electronica had an affair with Kate Emma Rothschild, the wife of Benjamin Goldsmith, resulting in the breakdown of Goldsmith's marriage.

Jay Electronica is a registered member of the Nation of Islam and follower of Louis Farrakhan. His views play a major role in his music, including his debut studio album, A Written Testimony (2020), where Electronica speaks in both English and Arabic.

== Controversies ==
=== Statements about the Illuminati ===
On March 13, 2020, Electronica posted a series of Tweets in which he claimed to have had a meeting with The Illuminati. He accused certain groups in society of being part of the Illuminati, such as the Dominicans, the Visigoths, and the Jehovah's Witnesses, and was accused of racism, religious discrimination, and being a conspiracy theorist.

=== Feud with Joe Budden ===
Since March 2020, Electronica has been involved in a feud with broadcaster, media personality, and former rapper Joe Budden due to Budden's negative review of Electronica's debut album, A Written Testimony, with Budden saying he hated the album and called it "A Jay-Z Mixtape" because Jay-Z showed up Electronica.

=== Antisemitism ===
The track "Ghost of Soulja Slim" from A Written Testimony includes multiple references to Jewish conspiracy theories, including the Rothschilds; the "Synagogue of Satan", a phrase from Revelation 2:9 often considered an antisemitic slur; and samples sermons by Louis Farrakhan, the Nation of Islam leader whose rhetoric has often been denounced as antisemitic. Electronica previously referenced the "Synagogue of Satan" on the track "Better in Tune (With the Infinite)" in 2014, and again referenced the Rothschilds conspiracy theory in a verse on Noname's 2023 song "Balloons". Amid the controversy, his 2012 song "Bitches and Drugs", in which he called himself "Jaydolph Spitler, rap Hitler", resurfaced. His support for Kanye West and Nick Cannon during their respective antisemitism scandals was also criticized.

== Discography ==
- A Written Testimony (2020)
- Act II: The Patents of Nobility (The Turn) (2020)

== Awards and nominations ==
=== Grammy Awards ===
Year	Nominee / work	Award	Result	Ref.
2021	A Written Testimony	Best Rap Album	Nominated	
2022	Donda	Album of the Year	Nominated	
