= Act 1: Eternal Sunshine (The Pledge) =

Act I: Eternal Sunshine (The Pledge)

Mixtape by Jay Electronica
- Released: July 2, 2007
- Genre: Hip hop
- Length: 15:40
- Label: Self-published

Jay Electronica chronology
Act I: Eternal Sunshine (The Pledge) (2007)	A Written Testimony (2020)

Alternative cover
- Commercial cover art, which replaces the original since the 2016 Tidal re-release.

Official audio
- Act 1: Eternal Sunshine on YouTube

Act I: Eternal Sunshine (The Pledge) is the debut mixtape by American rapper Jay Electronica, self-published onto MySpace on July 2, 2007. The mixtape, a hip-hop record, plays as one 15-minute track, sampling five different tracks of American record producer Jon Brion's 2004 film score, Eternal Sunshine of the Spotless Mind. The mixtape covers a range of themes and subjects, including hip hop, Islam, and unidentified flying objects, and is notable for its lack of drums. It also features a spoken word opening from Jay Electronica's frequent collaborators Just Blaze and Erykah Badu.

Jay Electronica began recording Act I: Eternal Sunshine (The Pledge) with his built-in laptop microphone before completing it in Detroit. It has received critical acclaim for its experimentation and has since been described as Jay Electronica's breakout project. A follow-up album titled Act II: Patents of Nobility (The Turn) was recorded from 2010 to 2012, but remained unreleased until it leaked on October 4, 2020. His debut album, A Written Testimony, was released instead in 2020, nearly thirteen years later. The mixtape would later be re-released on the 18th of September, 2025, alongside its sequel.

== Background and recording ==
Jay Electronica said he was motivated to create the mixtape due to the influence of films on him and his art. After watching the 2004 film Eternal Sunshine of the Spotless Mind, he felt inspired by its story and its score, composed by Jon Brion. He singled out a scene in which Jim Carrey's character Joel is excited for the first time in the film when meeting Kate Winslet's character Clementine, noting the contrapuntal nature of the low-key score when played underneath what appears to be a highly pivotal scene. Jay Electronica stated he "just wanted to do something that felt like that".

That night, he looped Brion's music and recorded a 32-bar verse on GarageBand with his built-in laptop microphone. He uploaded the demo onto his Myspace as "Eternal Sunshine". After the "Eternal Sunshine" demo received positive reception, Jay Electronica went to Detroit to record the rest of the mixtape over Brion's score. In a 2007 interview, Jay Electronica stated the movements were listed in order of creation and mood change, as he rapped about what he "was dealing with mentally at the time". He "decided to have it as one piece so that whoever heard it could experience it the way it was intended".

== Music and composition ==
Act I: Eternal Sunshine (The Pledge) is a hip hop record. Built on samples from Jon Brion's Eternal Sunshine of the Spotless Mind film score, the mixtape contains no drums. The sampled score was described as a "dreamlike melancholy" by Adam Isaac Itkoff of Okayplayer and includes pianos. The score samples several films, including 1971 American film Willy Wonka & the Chocolate Factory. Sweeney Kovar of The Boombox described the final movement as the only part of Brion's score "that can be described as optimistic or otherwise cheerful.". New York Post's Rob Bailey-Millado characterized Jay Electronica's rapping as trippy.

== Themes and lyrics ==
Sweeney Kovar of The Boombox described Act I: Eternal Sunshine (The Pledge) as "a dissection of society through a hip-hop lens". In the mixtape, Jay Electronica references Islam, which became consistent with his discography. The mixtape's opening is a spoken word piece performed by American singer-songwriter Erykah Badu and American producer Just Blaze. Badu describes her first encounter with Jay Electronica and Just Blaze describes the nature of the mixtape. Jay Electronica does not appear on the mixtape until six minutes in.

Act I: Eternal Sunshine (The Pledge)
Audio sample from the mixtape's second movement "Eternal Sunshine". Jay Electronica denounces traditional hip-hop and boasts that his music is "God-hop".

On the second movement "Eternal Sunshine", he frames Act I by setting his role as a metaphysician. He proclaims his genre to be "God-hop" and denounces traditional hip-hop, but admits that its rewards are tempting. The third movement, "…Because He Broke the Rules", begins with a Willy Wonka sample where the title character yells at a boy for stealing Fizzy Lifting Drinks, thus preventing the boy from receiving his prize. This sample serves as a metaphor for the high demands that a romantic relationship can impose on each person as Jay Electronica raps about being emotionally broken and lonely. He evokes the duality of good and evil with the left-and-right sides of his brain.

On the fourth movement "Voodoo Man", the title character has three different incarnations for each verse. In the first incarnation, the Voodoo Man is a rapper "who can turn nothing into something." In the second incarnation, the Voodoo Man becomes the "Asiatic Black Man of East Asia", derived from Nation of Islam theology, who uses an unidentified flying object to travel to New Orleans, Japan, and Tepoztlán. The final incarnation is the same Voodoo Man but with no regard for humanity. He compares colonialism to modern hip-hop. Jay Electronica also praises Elijah Muhammad, former leader of the Nation of Islam. The fifth and final movement, "FYI", opens with a sampled speech from Muhammad. Jay Electronica reflects on man's relatively short time on Earth and contrasts a rapper's obsession with jewelry to the larger-scale declassification of UFO files by CNES. "Lucifer" is described as the condition that humankind battles with.

== Release and promotion ==
Jay Electronica released Act I: Eternal Sunshine (The Pledge) onto his Myspace on July 2, 2007, while he was still a relatively unknown rapper. It had no formal promotion, but garnered over 50,000 downloads within the first 30 days of its posting. Thus, the mixtape has been described as Jay Electronica's breakout project. He previously released the second movement as a demo track onto MySpace and received positive reception. The mixtape was rereleased onto the streaming service Tidal on July 2, 2016. On September 17, 2025, the mixtape was released to Spotify and Apple Music, alongside its sequel, Act II: The Patents of Nobility (The Turn) (2020).

== Critical reception ==
In 2010, Matt Diehl of Interview described Act I: Eternal Sunshine (The Pledge) as "a 15-minute musique concrete surreal symphony". That same year, The Guardian's Paul Lester compared parts of the mixtape to American musician Ariel Pink. In 2013, Ryan Bassil from Vice noted the mixtape's lack of drums and called it "a timeless classic". In 2017, Adam Isaac Itkoff, writing for Okayplayer, revisited the mixtape for its ten-year anniversary and described it as "one of the most fearlessly experimental rap releases to ever dawn upon the digital age". In 2020, Dhruva Balram from NME wrote that the mixtape was "a change of pace in an age where everything was auto-tuned." That same year, Brendan Klinkenberg of Rolling Stone described it as weird and dense but praised the rapping, stating that it allowed Jay Electronica to be "quickly hailed as the genre's next great hope."

== Track listing ==
The mixtape plays as one singular track, but has five separate movements:

No.	Title	Length
1.	"Foreword" (performed by Erykah Badu and Just Blaze)
2.	"Eternal Sunshine"
3.	"...Because He Broke the Rules"
4.	"Voodoo Man"
5.	"FYI"
Total length:		15:40
