= Exhibit C =

Single by Jay Electronica
- Released: December 22, 2009
- Genre: Conscious hip hop
- Length: 5:31
- Label: Decon; The Dogon Society
- Songwriters: Timothy Elpadaro Thedford; Justin Smith
- Producer: Just Blaze

Jay Electronica singles chronology
"Exhibit A" (2009)	"Exhibit C" (2009)	"Just Begun" (2010)

"Exhibit C" is a song by American hip hop recording artist and record producer Jay Electronica. The song, a conscious hip-hop record, was written by Electronica himself, alongside Just Blaze, who also produced the track. It would later be released to iTunes on December 22, 2009, through Decon Records and The Dogon Society, as an EP with explicit, clean, and instrumental versions.

Upon its release, the song was positively received by music critics, and was remixed by fellow rappers, such as Fabolous, B.o.B, Childish Gambino, Twista, Conway the Machine, The Game, Lil B, and Big K.R.I.T., alongside others. It would also chart at number 86 on the Billboard Hot R&B/Hip-Hop Songs chart in the United States.

== Background ==
The song, produced by Just Blaze, samples Billy Stewart's "Cross My Heart". Jay has stated that the song was produced in only 15 minutes for the purpose of premiering a new song on Angela Yee's show on Shade 45. The lyrics reference a time when Jay was homeless in New York City. Despite not having an album or major label support, the song received airplay on stations like WQHT. Beginning in 2021, the explicit version of the song has been replaced with the radio edit across most major streaming platforms, including Spotify, and Apple Music. The EP cover art is a tinted photograph of inventor Nikola Tesla sitting in the Colorado Springs experimental station with his "Magnifying Transmitter".

== Critical reception ==
The song has received rave reviews from critics. NME said, "'Exhibit C' is the most accomplished piece of 'conscious rap' this millennium — perhaps ever." Shaheem Reid of MTV.com said it "is one of those special hip-hop records that you hear and instantly love." Wes Flexner of The Other Paper says the song "has created a feeling that hasn't existed since Common Sense's 1994 single 'I Used to Love H.E.R.' Both songs make everyone, regardless of their current role in life, remember why they fell in love with hip-hop." Henry Adaso of About.com called "Exhibit C" the best rap song of 2009, saying it "embodies everything people admire about Jay Electronica — a combo of compelling confessionals and convincing boasts, delivered in a charismatic manner." On July 25, 2010 MTV2's Sucker Free Summit award show awarded "Exhibit C" with the Instant Classic Award. On April 22, 2013 Complex also gave the track the top spot on their "30 Most Lyrical Rap Songs of the Past 5 Years," calling the cut "a magical moment—one he nor any other rapper in the past five years could top."

== Remixes ==
The instrumental became very popular among hip-hop artists, with several rappers such as Fabolous, Cassidy, Crooked I, Joell Ortiz, Bobby Creekwater, AZ, N.O.R.E., Saigon, Charles Hamilton, B.o.B, Childish Gambino, Twista, Papoose, Conway the Machine, Game, Lil B, Cashis and Big K.R.I.T. recording their own versions of the song. Mos Def has performed the song live.

== Charts ==
Chart (2010)	Peak position
U.S. Billboard Hot R&B/Hip-Hop Songs	86
