= MellowHype discography =

- Studio albums: 2
- Compilation albums: 1
- Singles: 2
- Music videos: 6
- Mixtapes: 3

The discography of MellowHype, an American duo, record producer and member of the Los Angeles, California hip hop collective Odd Future, encompasses 2 studio albums, 3 mixtape, 2 singles, and 6 music videos.

== Studio albums ==
Year	Album details	Peak chart positions			
Year	Album details	US 200	US R&B	US Rap	US Ind.
2010/2011	BlackenedWhite: Released: October 31, 2010/July 12, 2011; Label: Self-released/Fat Possum; Format: CD, MD, LP	81	19	11	18
2012	Numbers: Released: October 9, 2012; Label: Odd Future Records; Format: CD, MD, LP	54	8	7	11

=== With Odd Future ===
Year	Album
2012	The OF Tape Vol. 2: Released: March 20, 2012; Label: Odd Future Records; Format: MD, CD, LP

=== With Domo Genesis as MellowHigh ===
Year	Album
2013	MellowHigh: Released: October 31, 2013; Label: Odd Future Records; Format: MD

== Compilations ==
Year	Album
2011	12 Odd Future Songs (with Odd Future): Released: October 3, 2011; Label: Odd Future Records; Format: MD, LP

== Mixtapes ==
Year	Album
2008	The Odd Future Tape (with Odd Future): Released: 2008; Label: Self-released; Format: MD
2010	YelloWhite: Released: 2010; Label: Self-released; Format: MD
2010	Radical (with Odd Future): Released: 2010; Label: Self-released; Format: MD
2012	MellowHypeWeek: Released: 2012; Label: Odd Future Records; Format: MD
2014	INSA (I Need Some Answers): Released: 2014; Label: Odd Future Records; Format: MD

== Singles ==
Year	Title	Album
2011	"64"	BlackenedWhite
2012	"La Bonita"	Numbers

== Music videos ==
Year	Video	Director
2010	Polyurthane	KUMASISADIKI
2011	"64"	Matt Alonzo
2012	"La Bonita"	_P
2012	"Break"	GL II (Hodgy Beats)
2013	"Troublesome2013" (With Domo Genesis as MellowHigh)	Ian Flanigan
2013	"Yu" (With Domo Genesis as MellowHigh)	MellowHigh / _P
2013	"Extinguisher" (With Domo Genesis as MellowHigh)	Luis Perez
2014	"Nowadays"	High5Collective
2014	"FIFAFOFUM!"	Sean Solomon

== See also ==
- Hodgy discography
- Left Brain production discography
