= Domo Genesis discography =

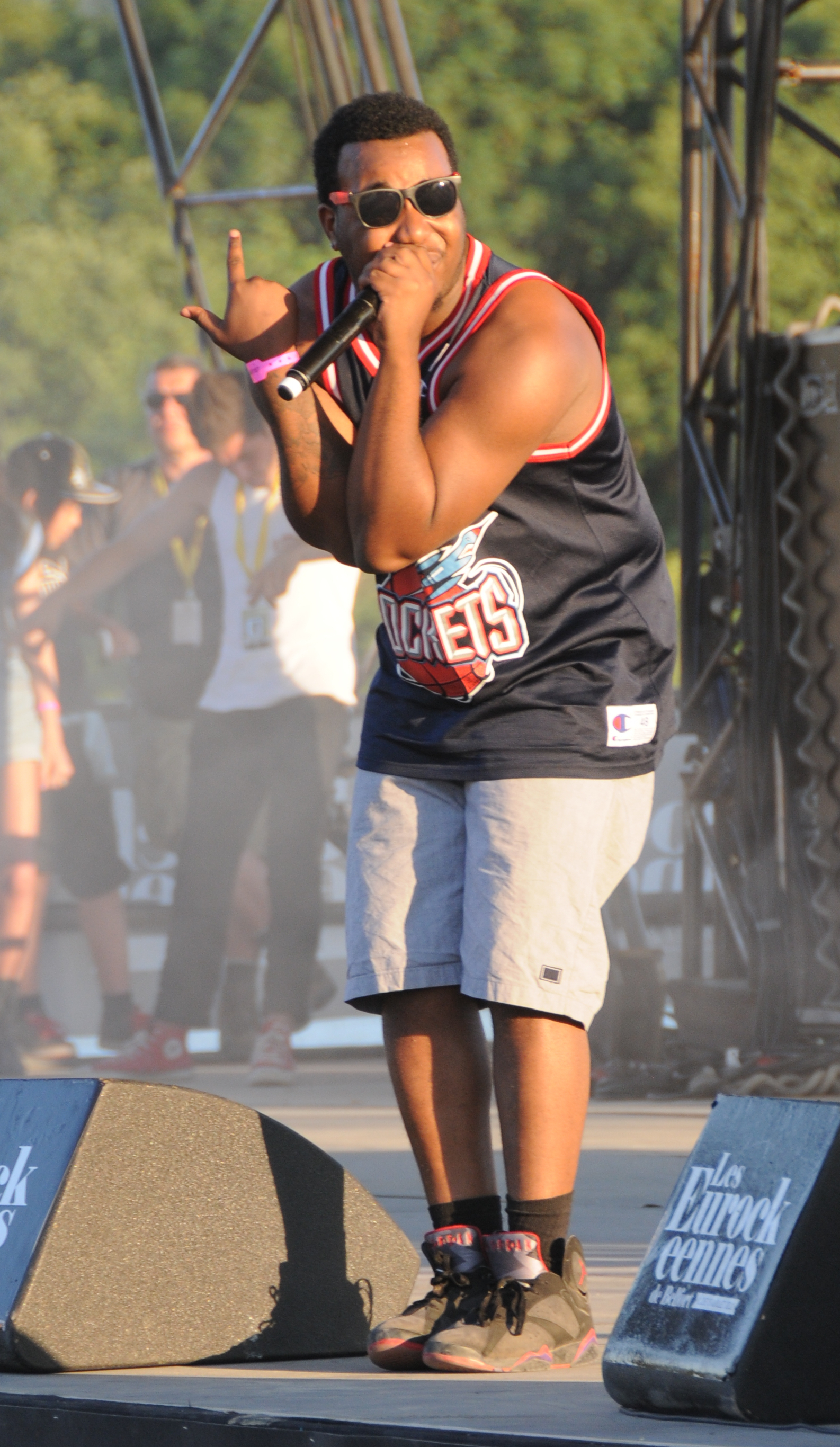
- Domo Genesis performing at Eurockeennes in 2011
- Studio albums: 4
- EPs: 5
- Compilation albums: 1
- Singles: 4
- Music videos: 9
- Mixtapes: 7
- Guest appearances: 42
- Collaborative albums: 2

The discography of American hip-hop recording artist Domo Genesis consists of four studio albums two collaborative albums, one compilation album, five extended play, seven mixtapes, 4 singles (including 2 as a featured artist), and 9 music videos.

== Albums ==
=== Studio albums ===
List of studio albums, with year released
| Title | Album details | Peak chart positions | | |
| Title | Album details | US | US R&B | US Rap |
|---|---|---|---|---|
| Genesis | Released: March 24, 2016; Label: Columbia Records, Odd Future Records; Formats: CD, digital download | 110 | 14 | 9 |
| Intros, Outros & Interludes (with Evidence) | Released: July 29, 2022; Label: Bigger Picture Recordings; Formats: CD, LP, digital download, streaming | | | |
| What You Don't Get?! (with Graymatter) | Released: October 27, 2023; Label: Things Happen; Formats: LP, digital download, streaming | | | |
| SCRAM! (with Graymatter) | Released: November 7, 2025; Label: Things Happen; Formats: LP, digital download, streaming | | | |

=== Collaborative albums ===
List of collaborative albums, with year released
| Title | Album details | Peak chart positions | | |
| Title | Album details | US | US R&B | US Rap |
|---|---|---|---|---|
| The OF Tape Vol. 2 | Released: March 20, 2012; Label: Odd Future Records, RED Distribution; Formats: CD, LP, digital download, streaming | 5 | 1 | 1 |
| MellowHigh | Released: October 31, 2013; Label: Odd Future, RED Music; Formats: Digital download, streaming | 81 | 17 | 8 |

=== Extended plays ===
List of extended plays with selected details
| Title | Details |
|---|---|
| Facade Records | Released: December 7, 2018; Label: Genesis Music, LLC / EMPIRE; Formats: Digital download |
| Just in Case (with Mike & Keys as Facade Records) | Released: July 3, 2020; Label: Facade Records; Formats: Digital download |
| Just in Case 2 (with Mike & Keys as Facade Records) | Released: August 7, 2020; Label: Facade Records; Formats: Digital download |
| World Class Trouble Solvers (with Graymatter) | Released: May 31, 2023; Label: Things Happen; Formats: Digital download |
| WORLD GONE MAD (with Graymatter) | Released: August 1, 2025; Label: Things Happen; Formats: LP, Digital download |

=== Mixtapes ===
List of mixtapes, with year released
| Title | Album details |
|---|---|
| Radical (with Odd Future) | Released: May 7, 2010; Label: Self-released; Formats: digital download |
| Rolling Papers | Released: August 30, 2010; Label: Self-released; Formats: digital download |
| Under the Influence | Released: September 20, 2011; Label: Self-released; Formats: digital download |
| No Idols (with The Alchemist) | Released: August 1, 2012; Label: Self-released; Formats: digital download, streaming |
| Under the Influence 2 | Released: November 5, 2014; Label: Self-released; Formats: digital download |
| Red Corolla | Released: June 16, 2017; Label: Self-released; Formats: digital download, streaming |
| Aren't U Glad You're U? | Released: January 19, 2018; Label: Self-released; Formats: CD, vinyl, cassette, digital download |

== Singles ==
=== As lead artist ===
List of singles as lead artist, showing year released and album name
| Title | Year | Album |
|---|---|---|
| "Dapper" (featuring Anderson .Paak) | 2016 | Genesis |
| "Go (Gas)" (featuring Wiz Khalifa, Juicy J, and Tyler, the Creator) | 2016 | Genesis |

=== As featured artist ===
List of singles as featured artist, showing year released and album name
| Title | Year | Peak chart positions | Album |
| Title | Year | US R&B/HH Dig. | Album |
|---|---|---|---|
| "Rella" (Odd Future featuring Hodgy Beats, Domo Genesis and Tyler, The Creator) | 2012 | 50 | The OF Tape Vol. 2 |
| "Reform School" (Boldy James featuring Earl Sweatshirt, Da$h, and Domo Genesis) | 2013 | – | My 1st Chemistry Set |

== Other charted songs ==
List of other charted songs, with selected chart positions, showing year released and album name
| Title | Year | Peak chart positions | | | | Album |
| Title | Year | US | US R&B/HH | CAN | WW | Album |
|---|---|---|---|---|---|---|
| "Manifesto" (Tyler, the Creator featuring Domo Genesis) | 2021 | 84 | 35 | 93 | 109 | Call Me If You Get Lost |

== Guest appearances ==
List of non-single guest appearances, with other performing artists, showing year released and album name
| Title | Year | Other artist(s) | Album |
|---|---|---|---|
| "Pigs Fly" | 2009 | Tyler, the Creator | Bastard |
| "Brain" | 2010 | MellowHype | BlackenedWhite |
| "Window" | 2011 | Tyler, the Creator, Hodgy Beats, Mike G, Frank Ocean | Goblin |
| "Odd & Twisted" | 2011 | Peter Rosenberg, Tyler, The Creator | What's Poppin Volume 1 |
| "PNCINTLOFWGKTA" | 2012 | Casey Veggies, Tyler, the Creator, Hodgy Beats, Earl Sweatshirt | Customized Greatly Vol. 3 |
| "Ashtray" | 2012 | Smoke DZA, Schoolboy Q | Rugby Thompson |
| "Greezy" | 2012 | MellowHype | MellowHypeWeek |
| "SWV" | 2012 | Smoke DZA, Mookie Jones | Sweet Baby Kushed God |
| "Rusty" | 2013 | Tyler, the Creator, Earl Sweatshirt | Wolf |
| "MellowHigh" | 2013 | TreeJay, DJ Clockwork, Larry Fisherman, Hodgy Beats | Showtime |
| "Wonderful World" | 2013 | The Jet Age of Tomorrow, Vince Staples | JellyFish Mentality |
| "Y.N.T." | 2013 | Prodigy, The Alchemist | Albert Einstein |
| "Camp Registration" | 2013 | The Alchemist, Step Brothers, Blu, Action Bronson | SSUR |
| "1010 Wins" | 2013 | The Alchemist, Action Bronson, Meyhem Lauren, Roc Marciano, Despot | SSUR |
| "Tesla" | 2013 | The Alchemist, Freddie Gibbs, Hodgy Beats | SSUR |
| "20 Wave Caps" | 2013 | Earl Sweatshirt | Doris |
| "Knight" | 2013 | Earl Sweatshirt | Doris |
| "Doin Me" | 2013 | Trademark Da Skydiver | Flamingo Barnes 2: Mingo Royale |
| "Cherish the Day" | 2013 | King Chip | —N/a |
| "Byron G" | 2014 | Step Brothers, The Whooliganz | Lord Steppington |
| "Robes" | 2014 | Freddie Gibbs, Madlib, Earl Sweatshirt | Piñata |
| "Piñata" | 2014 | Freddie Gibbs, Madlib, G-Wiz, Casey Veggies, Sulaiman, Meechy Darko, Mac Miller | Piñata |
| "The G Code" | 2014 | The Alchemist, Budgie, Action Bronson, Blu | The Good Book |
| "Hallelujah" | 2014 | Dilated Peoples, Fashawn, Rapsody, Vinnie Paz, Action Bronson | Directors of Photography |
| "Atlantis" | 2014 | Thelonious Martin, Currensy | Wünderkid |
| "Hodgy x Doms" | 2015 | Hodgy Beats | Dena Tape 2 |
| "New Balance" | 2015 | Hodgy Beats | Dena Tape 2 |
| "Plz Don't Make Me Do It" | 2015 | Flatbush Zombies | Day of the Dead |
| "Last Action Hero" | 2015 | Mani Draper, Iamsu! | —N/a |
| "Stay Back" | 2015 | Erick Arc Elliott | Archstrumentals Vol. 1 |
| "The Trophy Room" | 2015 | Statik Selektah, Skyzoo, Easy Money, Masspike Miles | Lucky 7 |
| "4:50 AM" | 2015 | Dash, Remy Banks | —N/a |
| "In the Bag" | 2015 | Mac Miller, Juicy J, Schoolboy Q | GO:OD AM |
| "Real Talk" | 2016 | Young Roddy | Good Sense 3 |
| "Class Picture" | 2016 | Durag Dynasty | —N/a |
| "Unfukwittable" | 2016 | Smoke DZA, Roc Marciano | George Kush Da Button (Don't Pass Trump the Blunt) |
| "Break It Down" | 2016 | Aaron Rose | Elixir |
| "MellowHigh" | 2017 | Left Brain, Hodgy | Mind Gone Volume 1 |
| "Bimmers X Jeeps" | 2017 | Les | Midnight Club |
| "Body Bag" | 2017 | Madchild, Oh No | The Darkest Hour |
| "Polish Jazz Vibes" | 2017 | Tha God Fahim | I Give You Art |
| "Bottle Rocket" | 2018 | KOVAS, Amber Ojeda | On My Block: Season 1 (Soundtrack) |
| "Yabo Bass" | 2018 | Blended Babies | Supervillain |
| "Good News" | 2018 | .idk. | IDK & FRIENDS :) |
| "Expansion" | 2019 | Smoke DZA, Young Roddy | Zour |
| "Up Jump" | 2020 | Smoke DZA & The Smokers Club | Worldwide Smoke Session |
| "Bar Fight" | 2021 | Planet Asia | Rule of Thirds |
| "MANIFESTO" | 2021 | Tyler, the Creator | Call Me If You Get Lost |
| "Burn the Playbook" | 2023 | DJ Muggs, Evidence | Soul Assassins 3: Death Valley |
| "Game Winners." | 2024 | Remy Banks | champ hoody music. ep. 3 |
| "Pride or Ego" | 2024 | ANKHLEJOHN | Pride of a Man |
| "No Exceptions" | 2024 | 3wayslim | BIG 3 |
| "Space Heater" | 2024 | Conductor Williams | CONDUCTOR WE HAVE A PROBLEM, Part 3 |
| "Sunsets Over Inglewood" | 2025 | Dough Networkz, Graymatter | Dis For The Project (Side A) |
| "Last Laugh" | 2025 | Jericho Jackson (Elzhi & Khrysis), Oh No | —N/a |
| "End of the Day" | 2025 | Xzibit, Tre Capital, Adé Békoé | Kingmaker |
| "Favorite Injury" | 2025 | Evidence | Unlearning, Vol. 2 |

== Music videos ==
List of music videos, with directors, showing year released
| Title | Year | Director(s) |
|---|---|---|
| "Dapper" (featuring Anderson .Paak) | 2016 | Alex Lill |
| "Me vs. Me" | 2018 | €¥£$ |
| "ONLINE" | 2018 | Unknown |
