= Hodgy discography =

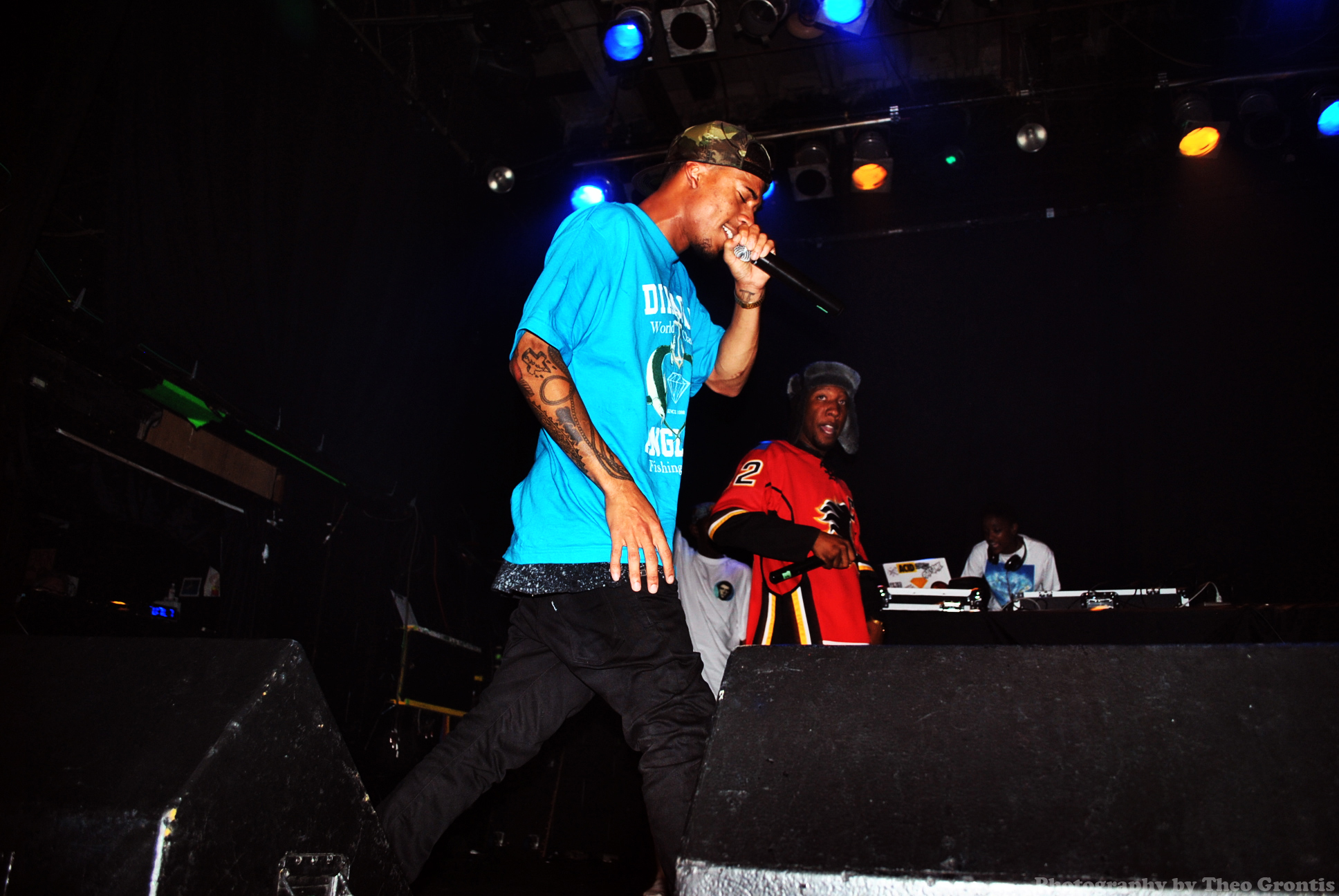
- Hodgy performing in May 2011
- Studio albums: 2
- EPs: 3
- Singles: 5
- Mixtapes: 4

The discography of Hodgy, an American hip hop recording artist, consists of two studio albums, four mixtapes and three EPs.

== Studio albums ==
List of studio albums, with selected chart positions
Title	Album details	Peak chart positions			Sales
Title	Album details	US	US R&B	US Rap	Sales
Fireplace: TheNotTheOtherSide	Released: December 9, 2016; Label: Columbia Records, Odd Future Records; Formats: CD, digital download, streaming	196	38	36	
Lovemesooner (as Jerry)	Released: February 14, 2024; Label: Poortrait; Formats: digital download, streaming	-	-	-	
"—" denotes a title that did not chart, or was not released in that territory.

== Mixtapes ==
List of mixtapes, with year released
Title	Album details
The Dena Tape (as Hodgy Beats)	Released: July 7, 2009; Label: Self-released; Format: Digital download
Dena Tape 2 (as Hodgy Beats)	Released: February 2, 2015; Label: Self-released; Format: Digital download
They Watching Lofi Series 1	Released: February 13, 2016; Label: Self-released; Format: Digital download
Dukkha	Released: August 29, 2016; Label: Self-released; Format: Digital download

== Extended plays ==
List of extended plays, with year released
Title	Album details
Untitled (as Hodgy Beats)	Released: February 24, 2012; Label: Odd Future; Formats: Digital download
Untitled 2 (as Hodgy Beats)	Released: June 1, 2013; Label: Odd Future; Formats: Digital download
Entitled	Released: May 20, 2022; Label: self-released; Formats: Digital download
Lovemesooner (as Jerry)	Released: November 9, 2023; Label: Poortrait; Formats: Digital download
Piupiupiu (as Jerry)	Released: December 6, 2023; Label: Poortrait; Formats: Digital download
Gayngsta (as Jerry)	Released: September 11, 2026; Label: Poortrait; Formats: Digital download

== Singles ==
=== As lead artist ===
List of singles, with selected chart positions, showing year released and album name
Title	Year	Album
"Barbell"	2016	Fireplace: TheNotTheOtherSide
"Final Hour" (featuring Busta Rhymes)	2016	Fireplace: TheNotTheOtherSide
"O.P.E.N." (with Alvin Risk, as HA)	2018	Non-album singles
"Precious" (with Alvin Risk, as HA)	2018	Non-album singles
"Jesus Is a Samurai" (with Alvin Risk, as HA)	2018	Non-album singles
"No Brainer"	2019	Non-album singles
"Everyday"	2022	Entitled
"People Change"	2022	Entitled
"Into Someone"	2022	Entitled
"We Never Knew"	2022	Entitled

=== As featured artist ===
List of singles, with selected chart positions, showing year released and album name
Title	Year	Album
"Sandwitches" (Tyler, the Creator featuring Hodgy Beats)	2010	Goblin
"Rachel Green" (Ruben Young featuring Hodgy)	2018	Dreamstate
"Nobody" (Rae Kahlil featuring Hodgy)	2019	non-album single

== Guest appearances ==
List of non-single guest appearances, with other performing artists, showing year released and album name
Title	Year	Other artist(s)	Album
"French!"	2009	Tyler, the Creator	Bastard
"Slow it Down"	2009	Tyler, the Creator	Bastard
"Session"	2009	Tyler, the Creator, Brandun DeShay, Mike G	Bastard
"Moonlight"	2010	Earl Sweatshirt	Earl
"SteamRoller"	2010	Domo Genesis, Frank Ocean	Rolling Papers
"Dust Off"	2010	The Jet Age of Tomorrow, Mike G	Journey to the 5th Echelon
"Analog"	2011	Tyler, the Creator	Goblin
"Window"	2011	Tyler, the Creator, Domo Genesis, Frank Ocean, Mike G	Goblin
"Burger"	2011	Tyler, the Creator	Goblin
"Outta Control"	2011	MED	Classic
"Ooh"	2011	Pusha T, Tyler, the Creator, Liva Don	Play Clothes Holiday 2011
"PNCINTLOFWGKTA"	2012	Casey Veggies, Tyler, the Creator, Domo Genesis, Earl Sweatshirt	Customized Greatly Vol. 3
"Blossom & Burn"	2012	Trash Talk, Tyler, the Creator	119
"So Many Details" (Remix)	2013	Toro y Moi	non-album single
"Jamba"	2013	Tyler, the Creator	Wolf
"Live"	2013	Mike G	Verses
"MellowHigh"	2013	Larry Fisherman, Domo Genesis	S.H.O.W.TIME
"Naked"	2013	The Jet Age of Tomorrow	JellyFish Mentality
"Tesla"	2013	The Alchemist, Domo Genesis, Freddie Gibbs	SSUR
"Look"	2013	Tyler, the Creator, Domo Genesis, Earl Sweatshirt	non-album single
"Lap of Luxury"	2014	Topaz Jones	The Honeymoon Suite
"24 Hour Spitness"	2014	Domo Genesis	Under the Influence 2
"Sundance Kids"	2014	Domo Genesis	Under the Influence 2
"Check Up"	2015	Marvel Alexander, Crystal Caines	Don't Die Yet
"Serving"	2015	MED, Blu, Madlib	Bad Neighbor
"Marcianos"	2015	Alexander Spit, Pell	non-album singles
"Beastmode"	2015	Alvin Risk	non-album singles
"Prime"	2016	Mike G	Mike Check Vol. II
"Boom Bap"	2016	SAP, Hit-Boy, Mike Zombie	Self Employed
"Look at the Time"	2016	Duckwrth	I'm Uugly
"P.S.A."	2017	Remy Banks	Champ Hoody Music Ep. 1
"MellowHigh"	2017	Left Brain, Domo Genesis	Mind Gone, Vol. 1
"Strip Club 2"	2017	Left Brain, Shann	Mind Gone, Vol. 1
"Goddess"	2017	Left Brain, Mike G, Shann, Syd	Mind Gone, Vol. 1
"Chef"	2017	JD. Reid	Calibrate
"Animah"	2017	Jonti, Midnight Mutants	Tokorats
"Details"	2018	Left Brain, L Dog	Mind Gone, Vol. 2: Gone, Never Forgotten
"For the MellowHype Fans"	2018	Left Brain	Mind Gone, Vol. 2: Gone, Never Forgotten
"S.H.T (silent hot tears/send hot tempura)"	2022	Saya Gray	19 Masters

== Music videos ==
List of music videos, with directors, showing year released
Title	Year	Director(s)
"Alone"	2013	Ian Flanagan and Hodgy Beats
"Karateman"	2013	Rob Haffey and Etienne Maurice
"Hunger"	2015	Hunter Lyon
"Barbell"	2016	Hodgy
"Aura"	2016	Hodgy
"Glory"	2017	Open the Portal
"Everyday"	2022	Jeff Wootton and Hodgy
"Into Someone"	2022	Andrew Beach and Jennifer Baichwal
"Aura - Beaches"	2022	Aaron A
"Aura - Gilwood"	2022	Aaron A
"Facing the Worst Fears"	2023	Emmett Malloy
