= Genesis (Domo Genesis album) =

Studio album by Domo Genesis
- Released: March 25, 2016
- Recorded: November 2013 – February 2016
- Genre: Hip-hop
- Length: 42:40
- Label: Odd Future; Columbia
- Producer: Cam O'bi; Christian Rich; DrewByrd; G Koop; Garcia Bros.; Kintaro; Left Brain; MaffYuu; Mike & Keys; Sap; Sha Money XL; Steely Wonderbread; Tyler, the Creator

Domo Genesis chronology
Under the Influence 2 (2014)	Genesis (2016)	Red Corolla (2017)

Singles from Genesis
- 1. "Dapper" Released: March 10, 2016; 2. "Go (Gas)" Released: March 17, 2016

Genesis is the debut studio album by American rapper Domo Genesis. It was released on March 25, 2016, through Odd Future and distributed by Columbia Records. The album contains features from Wiz Khalifa, Juicy J, Tyler, the Creator, Anderson .Paak, Tay Walker, Dash, King Chip, Mac Miller and JMSN, among others.

Genesis received generally positive reviews from critics, debuting at number 110 on the US Billboard 200. It was supported by two singles: "Dapper" and "Go (Gas)".

== Background ==
On November 13, 2013, Domo stated in a MellowHigh interview with Hodgy Beats and Left Brain that he is working on his debut studio album. On April 3, 2014, Domo stated that he plans to release his debut studio album before 2015. On February 17, 2016, Domo confirmed that the album is completed and is turned in for mixing.

== Release and promotion ==
On March 10, 2016, the pre-order, track listing and release date were revealed. The music video for the album's lead single "Dapper" was released on March 24, 2016 on the official Odd Future YouTube channel. It currently has over three million views, as of January 2017. On July 19, 2016, Domo performed "Dapper" on Jimmy Kimmel Live! with Anderson .Paak.

=== Singles ===
On March 10, 2016, the lead single, "Dapper" featuring Anderson .Paak was released. It was produced by Garcia Bros. On March 17, 2016, the second and final single "Go (Gas)" featuring Wiz Khalifa, Juicy J and Tyler, the Creator, was released. It was also produced by Tyler, the Creator.

== Critical reception ==
Professional ratings
Aggregate scores
Source	Rating
Metacritic	70/100
Review scores
Source	Rating
AllMusic	4/5 stars
Exclaim!	6/10
HipHopDX	4.0/5
Pitchfork	7.2/10
Pretty Much Amazing	C+

Genesis was met with generally positive reviews. At Metacritic, which assigns a normalized rating out of 100 to reviews from professional publications, the album received an average score of 70, based on six reviews.

David Jeffries of AllMusic said, "Domo Genesis still talks about weed and weirdness, and sometimes with a star-studded guest list, as the killer "Go (Gas)" features Wiz Khalifa, Juicy J, and Tyler, The Creator. Mac Miller figures into the great "Coming Back", but the bits about Domo's family, his autistic brother, and his own search for self make this a meatier album than expected." Keith Nelson Jr. of HipHopDX said, "It's the subtle sequencing--deliberate to show his progression--that elevates the project from merely a delinquent to being the tale of a reformed man." Sheldon Pearce of Pitchfork said, "Sometimes the hooks on Genesis get wonky, there are portions of the record that feel unfinished (like the second half of "Wanderer"), and every now and then Domo will sneak in a groaner. But for the most part, Genesis is a revelation."

Ebyan Abdigir of Exclaim! said, "Domo's Genesis is a step in the right direction, but he's walking to his destination, and not anywhere near where he needs to be just yet." Brian Tabb of Pretty Much Amazing said, "The sparks of great art are there, but the brain behind the creation lays dormant. Time will tell where Domo goes, and honestly Genesis isn't a bad beginning."

== Track listing ==
Genesis track listing
No.	Title	Writer(s)	Producer(s)	Length
1.	"Awkward Groove"	Dominique Cole; Adam Feeney; Michael Cox, Jr.; John Groover	Mike & Keys	2:33
2.	"One Below"	Cole; Michael Clervoix; Esteban Crandle; Robert Mandell	Sha Money XL; G Koop^{[a]}	6:36
3.	"Wanderer" (featuring Tay Walker)	Cole; Robert Glasper; Cameron Osteen; Taylor Walker	Cam O'bi	2:54
4.	"Questions" (featuring Dash and Kendra Foster)	Cole; Matthew Byas; Aja Grant; Darien Dash; Foster	MaffYuu	5:03
5.	"My Own" (featuring JMSN)	Cole; Kehinde Hassan; Taiwo Hassan; Christian Berishaj	Christian Rich	2:37
6.	"Go (Gas)" (featuring Wiz Khalifa, Juicy J and Tyler, the Creator)	Cole; Tyler Okonma; Jordan Houston; Cameron Thomaz	Tyler, the Creator	3:43
7.	"Coming Back" (featuring Mac Miller)	Cole; Gary Taylor; Jonathan King; Malcolm McCormick	Sap	2:41
8.	"Faded in the Moment" (featuring Cam O'bi)	Cole; Osteen	Cam O'bi	3:29
9.	"Dapper" (featuring Anderson .Paak)	Cole; Dexter Wansel; Herbert Smith; Derrick Graves; Lemuel Harper; Steven Goldstein; Billy Johnson; George Howard; Larry Sheffrey; Víctor Wainstein; Brandon Anderson	Garcia Bros.	3:13
10.	"Brotha"	Cole; Jameel Bruner; Andrew Kim	DrewByrd; Kintaro	2:52
11.	"All Night" (featuring King Chip)	Cole; Vyron Turner; Sheffrey; Wainstein; Kevin McCall, Jr.; Charles Worth	Left Brain; Garcia Bros.^{[a]}	4:16
12.	"Lost and Found"	Cole; Juan Alderete; Jeffrey Dazey; Jeffrey Gitelman; Mark Nishita; Jiles Richardson	Steely Wonderbread	2:33
Total length:				42:40

Notes

- ^{^[a]} signifies an additional producer
- "Awkward Groove" and "One Below" feature additional vocals by Carmel Echols and Samantha Nelson
- "Wanderer" features additional vocals by Cam O'bi
- "Dapper" features additional vocals by Carmel Echols, Chaz Mason and Samantha Nelson
- "All Night" features additional vocals by Kevin McCall

Sample credits

- "Awkward Groove" contains a sample from "13 Gangbanglul", performed by Frank Dukes and written by Adam Feeney.
- "Wanderer" contains a sample from "Those Days", performed and written by Robert Glasper.
- "Coming Back" contains a sample from "I'm Coming Back", performed by Lalah Hathaway and written by Gary Taylor.
- "Dapper" contains a sample from "Voyager", performed by Dexter Wansel and written by Wansel, Herbert Smith, Derrick Graves, Lemuel Harper, Steven Goldstein, Billy Johnson and George Howard.

== Charts ==
Chart performance for Genesis
Chart (2016)	Peak position
US Billboard 200	110
US Heatseekers Albums (Billboard)	1
US Top R&B/Hip-Hop Albums (Billboard)	14
