= Untitled (Hodgy Beats EP) =

untitled

EP by Hodgy Beats
- Released: February 24, 2012
- Recorded: 2012
- Genre: Alternative hip hop
- Length: 22:12
- Label: Odd Future
- Producers: The Alchemist; Flying Lotus; Rodnae; Juicy J; Jonti Danimals; Thelonious Martin

Hodgy Beats chronology
The Dena Tape (2009)	untitled (2012)	Untitled 2 (2013)

Untitled (stylized as untitled) is the debut EP by Los Angeles, California rapper Hodgy Beats, member of hip-hop collective Odd Future. It was released on February 24, 2012. It is Hodgy Beats' first solo release since his 2009 debut mixtape, The Dena Tape. Announced on February 20, 2012, the EP was released on the 25th of the same month. The project features production by Juicy J, The Alchemist and Flying Lotus. Lyrically the record deals with thoughts about self-reflection, the contemplation of death, and a struggle with drugs. The EP received mostly positive reviews from music critics.

== Background ==
The EP was announced on Hodgy Beats' official Twitter account on February 20, 2012, and was released five days later. Unlike in their previous records, Odd Future did not contribute in the production, and Hodgy is the only person to rap on it. The song "Higashi Loves You" is the instrumental to "Somebody (Loves You)" by Plies and was produced by Rodnae. Producers Juicy J, The Alchemist and Flying Lotus all contributed beats to the project. The release of the EP served as promotion to Odd Future's debut album The OF Tape Vol. 2 which was released on March 20, 2012.

== Composition ==
Album opener "Bullshittin'" was produced by Three 6 Mafia's Juicy J, and features a murky bassline with a calming vibe. The track is inspired by the sound of southern hip hop. "Cookie Coma" was produced by The Alchemist, and contains a jazzy beat, with lush horns and upright bass. The style of production is inspired by boom bap production, with prominent sounding drums. Hodgy ponders his own morality on the track, with self-reflective lines such as "I’m too legit for life, I should get a grip and die, Fuckin’ take a trip and fly, and never come down".

"Lately" has a nursery rhyme sounding hook, produced by Flying Lotus. "Samurai" contains a melodic funky beat courtesy of Jonti Danimals. "In a Dream" offers a more calming canvas for Hodgy's rapping, with its haunting vocal sample. The song features abrupt guitar chords, and Hodgy muses lyrically over a tale of his first love. "Lamented" echoes the work of the late Detroit producer J Dilla. "If Heaven Is a Ghetto" has a relaxed beat, with Hodgy contemplating the concept of death. Album closer "Higashi Loves You" is a slow burner composed of 1980's inspired keys, skittering hi-hats, and a smooth aesthetic. The composition features Hodgy lamenting over his past with drugs.

== Reception ==
Professional ratings
Review scores
Source	Rating
Earmilk	favorable
Exclaim!	favorable
Fact	4/5 stars
NME	8/10
Pitchfork Media	6.7/10
Pretty Much Amazing	favorable
Spin	7/10
Sputnikmusic	3/5

Pitchfork Media's Jordan Sagent viewed that the EP "isn't blowing the doors off of anything, but plenty of rappers have trouble releasing records this tight and thematically consistent, and ultimately, Hodgy makes his name and money with MellowHype, and that group has shown no signs of slowing down." Exclaim!'s Gregory Drakes praised the track "Lamented", writing that the "strangely interesting production still amazes", and "for those who are still a bit weary about Odd Future, Hodgy Beats' Untitled EP is good appetizer even for the ficklest consumers." Jo Fuertes Knight of NME commented that while the record "probably won’t set the world alight", he called it an "accomplished project, resonating with crackly stoner soul and genuinely thoughtful lyrics – and a reminder that far from the teenage Tumblr caricature, Odd Future are still making some of the most exciting, accomplished music of our time." Stereogum's Corban Goble described the EP as "probably the best set of tracks the Odd Future camp has squeezed out since, like, Goblin."

Sputnikmusic's Sobhi Youssef stated that Hodgy had matured as a performer, improving both his flow and beat selection, though noted that the EP offered very little replay value, and that no track "really stuck out". Drew Malmuth of Pretty Much Amazing wrote that "considering all the dreck out there it’s hard to gripe too much about a hip-hop release with good production and lyricism that has bursts of real quality", though mused that the project sounded "distinctly underdeveloped in comparison to top-tier hip-hop".

== Track listing ==
No.	Title	Producer(s)	Length
1.	"Bullshittin'"	Juicy J	2:41
2.	"Cookie Coma"	The Alchemist	2:22
3.	"Lately"	Flying Lotus	1:45
4.	"Samurai"	Jonti Danimals	2:49
5.	"In a Dream"	The Alchemist	2:35
6.	"Ave."	Thelonious Martin	1:52
7.	"Lamented"	Flying Lotus	1:35
8.	"If Heaven Is a Ghetto"	Thelonious Martin	1:45
9.	"Higashi Loves You"	Rodnae	4:51

== Personnel ==
Credits for Untitled EP adapted from Allmusic.

- The Alchemist – producer
- Hodgy Beats – primary artist
- Flying Lotus – producer
- Jonti – producer
- Juicy J – producer
- Thelonious Martin – producer
