= Rachel Green (disambiguation) =

Rachel Green is a fictional character in the sitcom Friends, portrayed by Jennifer Aniston.

Rachel Green may also refer to:

- Rachel Green (scientist), American biologist
- "Rachel Green", a song by Ruben Young featuring Hodgy

== See also ==
- Rachel Greene, a supporting character in the TV drama ER
- Rachel Greene, a character in The Walking Dead comics
