= Untitled 2 (EP) =

untitled 2

EP by Hodgy Beats
- Released: June 1, 2013
- Recorded: 2013
- Genre: Alternative hip hop
- Label: Odd Future
- Producer: Left Brain; Garrett Stevenson

Hodgy Beats chronology
Untitled (2012)	untitled 2 (2013)	Dena Tape 2 (2015)

Untitled 2 (stylized untitled 2) is the second EP by Los Angeles, California rapper Hodgy Beats. The EP was released on June 1, 2013. The EP features guest appearances from Left Brain and Lee Spielman.

== Background ==
The EP was first announced on May 24, 2013.

== Track listing ==
No.	Title	Producer(s)	Length
1.	"SALE"	Left Brain	3:51
2.	"Alone"	Left Brain	3:57
3.	"Karateman" (featuring Left Brain)	Left Brain	3:22
4.	"Bullshittin'"	Left Brain	3:46
5.	"Years"	Deezy Toilets / Left Brain	3:22
6.	"Wicked"	Garrett Stevenson	2:58
7.	"Goodbye" (featuring Lee Spielman)	Garrett Stevenson	3:24
