= MellowHypeWeek =

Mixtape by MellowHype
- Released: September 11–18, 2012
- Recorded: 2012
- Genre: Alternative hip hop
- Label: Self-released
- Producer: Left Brain; Hodgy Beats

MellowHype chronology
BlackenedWhite (2011)	MellowHypeWeek (2012)	Numbers (2012)

MellowHypeWeek (stylized as MELLOWHYPEWEEK) is the third mixtape by Odd Future sub-group MellowHype. It was released to hold fans over until they released their second and final studio album, Numbers. A track was released every day from September 11 to 18, 2012. It contains features from Juicy J and Domo Genesis.

== Track listing ==
- All songs produced by Left Brain, except for "Godsss" produced by Hodgy Beats.

No.	Title	Length
1.	"Decoy"	3:45
2.	"Greezy" (featuring Domo Genesis)	3:35
3.	"Wasabi" (featuring Juicy J)	3:29
4.	"Godsss"	2:04
5.	"F"	2:22
6.	"LP"	3:41
7.	"WHAT"	4:44
