= Tokorats =

Studio album by Jonti
- Released: 3 November 2017
- Length: 50:31
- Label: Future Classic; Stones Throw

Jonti chronology
Sine And Moon (2012)	Tokorats (2017)

Singles from Tokorats
- 1. "Sleeping and Falling" Released: 26 September 2017; 2. "Staring Window" Released: 20 October 2017

Professional ratings
Aggregate scores
Source	Rating
Metacritic	76/100
Review scores
Source	Rating
AllMusic	3.5/5 stars
Pitchfork	5/10
PopMatters	8/10

Tokorats is the second studio album by Australian musician Jonti. It was released on 3 November 2017 through Future Classic in Australia and Stones Throw Records internationally.

== Track listing ==
No.	Title	Length
1.	"Lotus Street"	2:02
2.	"Alien"	2:13
3.	"Sleeping and Falling"	5:53
4.	"Island Rose" (featuring Sampa the Great)	3:44
5.	"Misto On the Moon"	1:59
6.	"Tokorats"	5:05
7.	"Isle of the Dead"	1:01
8.	"Zuki"	3:03
9.	"Cities"	4:46
10.	"Staring Window"	3:40
11.	"Animah" (featuring Hodgy, Midnight Mutants)	5:01
12.	"Love Prayer"	1:25
13.	"Maria Mapulane Thibiri"	1:38
14.	"Papaya Brothers"	4:21
15.	"Meese Man"	4:31
