= Ruben Young =

Canadian singer and songwriter

Ruben Young is a Canadian R&B/soul singer and songwriter from Calgary, Alberta, Canada. He is best known for his debut EP Dreamstate, which features the online hit, "Rachel Green" with American rapper Hodgy from Odd Future, his collaborations with Grammy nominee Lord Quest, Terrell Morris and JUNO winning rapper/producer Classified.

Recently named Apple Music's New Artist of the Week in Canada, Young's independent releases (through his own label, Young + Lucky) have earned him over five million streams.

== Rachel Green ft Hodgy ==
Young's most recognized single, "Rachel Green", was released independently through his own record label, Young + Lucky, and has since been streamed over 3.5 million times. It is a modern soul ode to his 1990s dreamgirl played by Jennifer Aniston on the hit television sitcom, Friends. The single was produced by Kuya (Alessia Cara, JRDN), and features a verse by Hodgy (formerly Hodgy Beats) from Odd Future.

== 50 Days YYC ==
In 2015, Ruben founded and directed the Calgary-based 50 Days YYC Music Festival. The inaugural campaign consisted of 50 consecutive days of pop-up style performances, showcasing a different local artist and collaborative local brand every day. The festival showcased over 68 artists including JUNO nominee, Joanna Borromeo.
