= Under the Influence (mixtape) =

Mixtape by Domo Genesis
- Released: September 20, 2011
- Recorded: 2011
- Genre: Hip-hop
- Length: 35:03
- Label: Odd Future
- Producer: Rahki; Hannibal King; Tha Bizness; Cardo; Michael Uzowuru

Domo Genesis chronology
Rolling Papers (2010)	Under the Influence (2011)	No Idols (2012)

Singles from Under the Influence
- 1. "Boss Life" Released: June 9, 2011; 2. "More Clouds" Released: July 28, 2011; 3. "Glory" Released: August 13, 2011; 4. "Mind Games" Released: September 4, 2011; 5. "Benediction" Released: September 16, 2011

Under the Influence is the second mixtape by Odd Future member Domo Genesis. The mixtape was made available for free download on September 20, 2011. The mixtape features Domo Genesis rapping over some of his favorite beats, with several original songs also included. Casey Veggies, Remy Banks and fellow Odd Future member Tyler, The Creator have features on the mixtape.

== Track listing ==
No.	Title	Producer(s)	Length
1.	"Mission Statement"	Rahki	3:09
2.	"Boss' Life"	Dr. Dre	2:10
3.	"Guess Who's Back" (featuring Casey Veggies)	Kanye West	2:03
4.	"L-Boy Interlude"	Kenny G; Walter Afanasieff	2:03
5.	"More Clouds" (featuring Remy Banks)	Hannibal King	2:40
6.	"Whole City Behind Us" (featuring Tyler, The Creator)	"Whole City Behind Us" by Kanye West	2:51
7.	"Respect"	"Jets Over Everything" by Curren$y	2:59
8.	"Let's Smoke"	Tha Bizness	3:01
9.	"Glory"	"GloryUs" by Kid Cudi & Chip tha Ripper	1:57
10.	"We Major"	Kanye West; Warryn Campbell; Jon Brion	2:00
11.	"Shine"	Cardo (Samples "Shine" by Lamont Dozier)	4:34
12.	"Mind Games (Snippet)"	Michael Uzowuru	1:42
13.	"Benediction"	Mobb Deep	2:47
14.	"Smokemon"	"Gotta Catch 'Em All" from Pokémon	1:16

== Notes ==
- The reverse cover mistakenly labels "Benediction" as produced by Uzowuru instead of "Mind Games"
- Tyler is credited as Ace on track 6
