= MellowHigh =

American hip-hop group

- Domo Genesis, Left Brain, and Hodgy in April 2013 (pictured from left to right)

Background information
- Origin: Los Angeles, California, U.S.
- Genres: Hip hop
- Years active: 2010–2015; 2017
- Label: Odd Future
- Spinoff of: Odd Future; MellowHype
- Members: Hodgy; Left Brain; Domo Genesis
- Website: oddfuture.com

MellowHigh was an American hip hop supergroup. It consisted of rapper Hodgy and producer Left Brain of MellowHype, and rapper Domo Genesis, all members of the hip-hop collective Odd Future. They have released one eponymous studio album in 2013.

== History ==
=== 2011–12: Early career ===
Since the formation of the group MellowHype, which consisted of rapper Hodgy Beats and producer Left Brain, they frequently collaborated with fellow Odd Future member Domo Genesis. Together they officially formed the sub-group of Odd Future, MellowHigh in 2011. The songs "Bitches", "Lean", "Rella", and "Hcapd" from The OF Tape Vol. 2 feature MellowHigh. In April 2012 the group released their first two official songs, "Timbs" produced by Lex Luger and "Go". Along with the song's releases, they announced that they would be working on a collaboration project together.

=== 2013–14: MellowHigh ===
On April 20, 2013, MellowHigh released their first single and music video entitled "Troublesome 2013". On August 24, 2013, it was revealed their debut album by the group MellowHigh will be released on October 31, 2013. The group also released promotional vlogs leading up to the release, showing footage of them on the Odd Future European tour 2013 and recording the project. Over the following months they periodically released songs via SoundCloud. On October 10, 2013, the music video for "Yu" was released. It was revealed MellowHigh will contain guest appearances by Tyler, The Creator, Curren$y, Smoke DZA, and Earl Sweatshirt among others. Upon the release, the album debuted at number 89 on the US Billboard 200.

MellowHigh did not release any material in 2014, leading people to believe MellowHigh disbanded.

=== 2015–present: MellowHype disbandment ===
On January 18, 2015, Hodgy Beats confirmed that MellowHype disbanded. He also added that he and Left Brain will continue to work with Domo Genesis as MellowHigh.

== Discography ==
=== Studio albums ===
- MellowHigh (2013)

=== Other appearances ===
List of other appearances, with other performing artists, showing year released and album name
Title	Years	Other artist(s)	Album
"Who Dat" ^{1}(Prod. by J. Cole)	2010	—N/a	—N/a
"SteamRoller" (Prod. by Tyler, The Creator)	2010	Domo Genesis, Hodgy, Frank Ocean	Rolling Papers
"Basic Bitch"	2010	Domo Genesis, MellowHype	Rolling Papers
"Brain"	2010	MellowHype, Domo Genesis	BlackenedWhite
"TangGolf" ^{2}(Prod. by RZA)	2011	—N/a	—N/a
"Lift"	2012	Juicy J	—N/a
"Bitches"	2012	—N/a	The OF Tape Vol. 2
"Lean"	2012	—N/a	The OF Tape Vol. 2
"Rella"	2012	Tyler, The Creator	The OF Tape Vol. 2
"Hcapd"	2012	Tyler, The Creator	The OF Tape Vol. 2
"Oldie" (Prod. by Tyler, The Creator)	2012	Odd Future	The OF Tape Vol. 2
"PNCINTLOFWGKTA" (Prod. by Tyler, The Creator)	2012	Casey Veggies, Earl Sweatshirt, Tyler, The Creator	Customized Greatly Vol. 3
"Timbs" (Prod. by Lex Luger)	2012	—N/a	—N/a
"Go" (Prod. by Thelonious Martin)	2012	—N/a	—N/a
"MellowHigh" (Prod. by Larry Fisherman)	2013	—N/a	S.H.O.W.TIME
"Tesla" (Prod. by The Alchemist)	2013	The Alchemist, Freddie Gibbs	SSUR
"Greezy"	2013	MellowHype, Domo Genesis	MELLOWHYPEWEEK
"In the Meantime" (Prod. by Thelonious Martin)	2013	—N/a	—N/a
"Look" (Prod. by Nottz)	2013	Tyler, The Creator, Earl Sweatshirt	—N/a
"24 Hour Spitness" ^{3}(Prod. by The Alchemist)	2014	Domo Genesis, Hodgy	Under the Influence 2
"Sundance Kids"	2014	Domo Genesis, Hodgy	Under the Influence 2
"Hodgy x Doms" (Prod. by Marvel Alexander)	2015	Hodgy, Domo Genesis	Dena Tape 2
"New Balance" (Prod. by Trifonic)	2015	Hodgy, Domo Genesis	Dena Tape 2
"MellowHigh"	2017	Left Brain, Hodgy, Domo Genesis	Mind Gone Volume 1

^{1} Uses the instrumental from the J. Cole song "Who Dat" from his album Cole World: The Sideline Story.

^{2} Uses the instrumental from the GZA song "4th Chamber", from his album Liquid Swords.

^{3} Uses the instrumental from the Mobb Deep song "The Realest", from their album Murda Muzik.

^{4} Uses the instrumental from the Trifonic song "Emergence" from their album of the same name.
