= MellowHigh (album) =

Studio album by MellowHigh
- Released: October 31, 2013
- Recorded: 2013
- Genre: Hip hop
- Length: 44:50
- Labels: Odd Future; RED
- Producers: Left Brain; Hodgy Beats

MellowHype chronology
Numbers (2012)	MellowHigh (2013)	INSA (2014)

Singles from MellowHigh
- 1. "Troublesome" Released: April 20, 2013; 2. "Yu" Released: October 14, 2013

MellowHigh is the only studio album by American hip hop group MellowHigh, which consists of Odd Future rappers Domo Genesis and Hodgy Beats, and record producer Left Brain. The album was released on October 31, 2013 by Odd Future Records and RED Distribution. The album features guest appearances from Tyler, The Creator, Earl Sweatshirt, Smoke DZA, Curren$y, and Remy Banks.

== Background ==
Since the formation of the group MellowHype, which consisted of rapper Hodgy Beats and producer Left Brain, they frequently collaborated with fellow Odd Future member Domo Genesis. Together they officially formed the sub-group of Odd Future, MellowHigh in 2011. The song "Rella" from The Odd Future Tape Vol. 2 was originally a MellowHigh song. In April 2012 the group released their first two official songs, "Timbs" produced by Lex Luger and "Go". Along with the song's releases, they announced that they would be working on a collaboration project together.

Word on the project would die down, while MellowHype released their second album Numbers, Hodgy Beats released Untitled 2 EP, and Domo Genesis released No Idols with producer The Alchemist. Then on April 20, 2013, the group released a new song and music video, "Troublesome" the first song from their upcoming album. Domo Genesis would state that the entire album was made in two months.

On August 24, 2013, it was revealed their self-titled debut album would be released on October 31, 2013. On October 15, 2013, they released the track list, revealing guest appearances from Tyler, The Creator, Earl Sweatshirt, Smoke DZA, Curren$y and Remy Banks.

== Release and promotion ==
The group released promotional vlogs leading up to the release, showing footage of them on the Odd Future European tour 2013 and the recording sessions for the album. On September 13, 2013, MellowHigh released "In the Meantime" a leftover track from the album's recording sessions. On October 28, 2013, the album was released for a limited free stream on MySpace.

During 2013 the group toured Europe with the rest of Odd Future, including the other sub-group EarlWolf consisting of Earl Sweatshirt and Tyler, The Creator. Following the tour, from October 24 through November 26, 2013 MellowHigh toured North America on a self-titled tour.

On September 18, 2013, the group released a snippet of the first single "Yu". On October 10, 2013, the self-directed music video for "Yu" was released, along with the album being released for pre-order on iTunes. "Yu" was met with positive reviews from music critics. The following day the audio to "Extinguisher" was premiered via SoundCloud. On October 28, 2013, the music video was released for "Extinguisher", which included cameo appearances by Tyler, The Creator and Taco Bennett.

== Commercial performance ==
MellowHigh debuted at number 89 on the US Billboard 200, with first week sales of 4,000 copies in the United States.

== Critical reception ==
Professional ratings
Aggregate scores
Source	Rating
Metacritic	65/100
Review scores
Source	Rating
CMJ	(positive)
HipHopDX	3/5 stars
The Line of Best Fit	5.5/10 stars
Pitchfork Media	6.8/10
PopMatters	6/10
Respect.	(positive)
XXL	3/5 (L)

MellowHigh was met with generally positive reviews from music critics. Lizzie Plaugic of CMJ stated, "The trio proves it has a fat bag of tricks: floaty fast rhymes (Get’n Drunk), high gravity boom bap (Troublesome) and haunting alien lullabies (Nobody)." Kyle Kramer of Pitchfork Media said, "These beats are huge, intimidating walls of sound. It may be that surprising people is a young man's game, and it's time for Domo Genesis and Hodgy Beats to settle into their comfortable roles as confident, reliable spitters. But for an album that sounds as off-the-wall as MellowHigh, it feels like a bit of a cop out to be content with insubstantial rapping." Laurence Day of The Line of Best Fit said, "The overall result is something that painfully needed some outside influences, perhaps another producer to steer them in a worthwhile direction – it’s an aimless, winding record that occasionally stumbles upon greatness."

Brian Josephs of XXL gave the album a "L" rating saying, "MellowHigh has its thrills with some credit going to Earl’s playful verse on “Cold World,” but too often the album feels stagnant." Jesse Fairfax of HipHopDX gave the album three out of five stars, saying "As a byproduct of a team that has actualized potential for groundbreaking contributions, MellowHigh misses the mark by a wide margin." Stephen Kearse of Respect. gave the album a positive review saying, "In the end, what MellowHigh was going for – a solid demonstration of their ability to make interesting music – was definitely accomplished. Hopefully things will remain that way for years to come."

== Track listing ==
- All songs are produced by Left Brain, except "Cigarillo" produced by Hodgy Beats

No.	Title	Writer(s)	Length
1.	"Goon'n"	Vyron Turner; Gerard Long; Dominique Cole	3:28
2.	"Air"	Turner; Long; Cole	2:56
3.	"Yu"	Turner; Long; Cole	2:27
4.	"Extinguisher"	Turner; Long; Cole	4:02
5.	"Nobody"	Turner; Long; Cole	3:20
6.	"Self Titled"	Turner; Long; Cole	2:19
7.	"Troublesome"	Turner; Long; Cole	3:24
8.	"Get'n Drunk"	Turner; Long; Cole	2:59
9.	"Roofless"	Turner; Long; Cole	3:26
10.	"HighLife" (featuring Currensy and Smoke DZA)	Turner; Long; Cole; Shante Franklin; Sean Pompey	4:41
11.	"Cold World" (featuring Remy Banks and Earl Sweatshirt)	Turner; Long; Cole; Remy Banks; Thebe Kgositsile	4:47
12.	"Cigarillo"		4:27
13.	"Yu" (Remix) (featuring Tyler, the Creator)	Turner; Long; Cole; Tyler Okonma	2:51

Leftover track

- "Look" (with EarlWolf)
- "In the Meantime"

== Chart positions ==
Chart (2013)	Peak position
UK R&B Albums (Official Charts)	30
US Billboard 200	89
US Billboard Top R&B/Hip-Hop Albums	17
