= YelloWhite =

Mixtape by MellowHype
- Released: February 24, 2010
- Recorded: 2008–09
- Genre: Alternative hip-hop
- Length: 55:01
- Label: Self-released
- Producer: Left Brain

MellowHype chronology
YelloWhite (2010)	BlackenedWhite (2010)

Professional ratings
Review scores
Source	Rating
Pitchfork Media	(mixed/neutral)
sputnikmusic	3.5/5 stars

YelloWhite is the debut mixtape by Odd Future sub-group MellowHype. It was made available for free download on February 24, 2010, fellow Odd Future member Earl Sweatshirt's 16th birthday.

== Background ==
The bonus tracks "rolex" and "claustroflowbic" were previously released on Hodgy Beats' debut mixtape, The Dena Tape. "blaccFriday" was later released on Mike G's second mixtape, Ali. The songs "bankRolls" and "rokRok" later appeared on Odd Future's compilation album 12 Odd Future Songs. Left Brain raps the first verse on the track "thuggin". On the track list, the twelfth track says "freakBass" instead of "rasta".

== Track listing ==
- All songs are produced by Left Brain.

No.	Title	Length
1.	"ElephunkCircus"	1:42
2.	"Smile More"	3:34
3.	"Team"	2:58
4.	"Bank Rolls"	3:50
5.	"Polyurthane"	3:07
6.	"Thuggin"	3:58
7.	"CopKiller" (featuring Earl Sweatshirt)	5:44
8.	"Blacc Friday" (featuring Mike G and Tyler, The Creator)	3:58
9.	"Premier"	3:14
10.	"SmokeSumKushWitMe"	3:03
11.	"Intoxicated Dreams"	3:20
12.	"Rasta (FreakBass)" (featuring Tyler, The Creator)	2:55
13.	"CocaineKeys"	3:05
14.	"Rok Rok"	3:39
15.	"Rolex"	3:20
16.	"Claustroflowbic"	3:34

Notes

- Tyler, The Creator is credited as Wolf Haley on the track "blaccFriday", and as Ace Creator on the track "rasta".
