= All Day DeShay: AM =

Mixtape by brandUn DeShay
- Released: September 30, 2011
- Recorded: 2011
- Genre: Hip hop
- Label: Seven7Ceven Music
- Producer: brandUn DeShay; DJ Battlecat; Elbee Thrie; Childish Major; The Super 3; Best Kept Secret

Singles from All Day DeShay: AM
- 1. "Ur Fresh!" Released: October 24, 2011; 2. "World Famous" Released: January 4, 2012

Professional ratings
Review scores
Source	Rating
URB	4/5 stars

All Day DeShay: AM is the fifth mixtape by American rapper and record producer brandUn DeShay (later known as Ace Hashimoto). The album is almost entirely produced by DeShay himself.

== Track listing ==
No.	Title	Producer(s)	Length
1.	"Shay Loves To Ball"	brandUn DeShay	2:12
2.	"World Famous"	brandUn DeShay	3:17
3.	"They Notice" (featuring Rockie Fresh)	brandUn DeShay	3:37
4.	"NOW! *OVA*"	brandUn DeShay	1:16
5.	"Ur Fresh!"	brandUn DeShay	3:12
6.	"VirGo Away For Awhile" (featuring Allen Ritter)	The Super 3	3:18
7.	"Canopy"	brandUn DeShay	3:07
8.	"Why Bother" (featuring Raz Fresco)	Childish Major	4:23
9.	"FTW!" (featuring Vic Mensa)	brandUn DeShay	3:15
10.	"1 Up!"	DJ Battlecat	3:54
11.	"Letter to God"	Craig Balmoris of Best Kept Secret	2:15
12.	"Take It Back"	Elbee Thrie	1:48
13.	"LATER! *OVA*"	brandUn DeShay	1:13
14.	"Canopy Pt. II"	brandUn DeShay	3:13
