= Numbers (MellowHype album) =

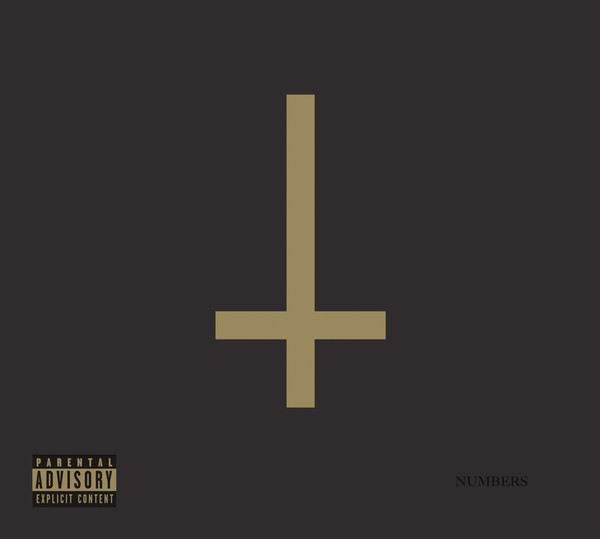

Studio album by MellowHype
- Released: October 9, 2012
- Recorded: 2011–12
- Studio: Casa Chica Malibu (Malibu, California); East West Recording Studios (Hollywood, California); Paramount Recording Studios (Hollywood, California); The Trap (Los Angeles, California)
- Genre: Alternative hip-hop
- Length: 56:17
- Label: Odd Future; RED; Sony
- Producer: Hodgy Beats; Left Brain; Michael Einziger; Tyler, the Creator

MellowHype chronology
MellowHypeWeek (2012)	Numbers (2012)	MellowHigh (2013)

Singles from Numbers
- 1. "La Bonita" Released: August 28, 2012; 2. "Grill" Released: October 4, 2012

Professional ratings
Aggregate scores
Source	Rating
Metacritic	73/100
Review scores
Source	Rating
AllMusic	4/5 stars
Exclaim!	(positive)
HipHopDX	3.5/5
Pitchfork	6.7/10
RapReviews	5/10

Numbers is the second and final studio album by American hip-hop duo MellowHype. It was released on October 9, 2012. This was their only release under a major label. The album also contains appearances from Odd Future members Frank Ocean, Mike G and Earl Sweatshirt.

== Singles ==
The album's first single, "La Bonita", was released on July 18, 2012. The full version of the track was released through iTunes on August 28, 2012, along with a music video on August 29, 2012.

On October 4, 2012, the album's second single, "Grill", was released through Odd Future's official SoundCloud. The music video for "Break" was released on November 27, 2012.

== Reception ==
On Metacritic, the album got a 73, indicating "generally favourable reviews", out of 5 critic reviews. In a positive review by AllMusic, they wrote "It's that line between accessible and alienating that MellowHype have so brilliantly walked, making Numbers an engaging album from some of Odd Future's best and brightest.". HipHopDX wrote, "Numbers can be applauded as the mature nature and notably impressive songwriting displays progression from MellowHype's older riotous material."

Exclaim gave a positive review, writing "Numbers proves that MellowHype are capable of making a good album without employing the over-the-top antics or shock themes they initially used to capture attention.". Pitchfork writer Jordan Sargent gave the album a 6.7, and wrote, "Numbers is a solid rap record, but MellowHype have shown themselves to be capable of more. They further burrow into their own world here, but it results in exponentially diminishing returns.". In a RapReviews article, writer Steve 'Flash' Juon wrote, "When you live by the viral, you can die by the viral too. The Odd Future fam needs better quality control to stay relevant in 2013 and beyond."

== Track listing ==
- All songs produced by Left Brain, except where noted

No.	Title	Writer(s)	Producer(s)	Length
1.	"Grill"	Gerard Long; Vyron Turner		3:46
2.	"65" / "Breakfast"	Long; Turner		6:54
3.	"Astro" (featuring Frank Ocean)	Long; Turner; Christopher Breaux	MellowHype	4:21
4.	"NFWGJDSH"	Long; Turner		3:08
5.	"La Bonita"	Long; Turner		3:04
6.	"Beat"	Long; Turner		3:35
7.	"Snare"	Long; Turner		3:29
8.	"Untitled L"	Long; Turner		4:14
9.	"LeFlair"	Long; Turner		2:44
10.	"Monster"	Long; Turner		3:30
11.	"666" (featuring Mike G)	Long; Turner; Mike Griffin II	Tyler, the Creator; Left Brain	3:26
12.	"P2" (featuring Earl Sweatshirt)	Long; Turner; Thebe Kgositsile	Left Brain; Michael Einziger	3:56
13.	"GNC"	Long; Turner		3:56
14.	"Brain"	Long; Turner		2:45
15.	"Under 2"	Long; Turner		4:10
16.	"Break"	Long; Turner		2:39
Total length:				59:31

Notes

- "Snare" contains background vocals from Chloe Clancy and Destiny Valadez

== Personnel ==
- MellowHype
  - Left Brain – executive producer, rapping
  - Hodgy Beats – executive producer, rapping
- Tyler, the Creator – co-producer on "666"
- Michael Einziger – co-producer on "P2", drums on "Monster", guitar on "P2"
- Chloe Clancy – background vocals on "Snare"
- Destiny Valadez – background vocals on "Snare"
- L-Boy – background vocals on "Untitled L"
- Daniel Hardaway – trumpet on "Brain"
- Frank Ocean – guest vocals on "Astro"
- Mike G – guest vocals on "666"
- Earl Sweatshirt – guest vocals on "P2"

== Charts ==
=== Weekly charts ===
Chart (2012)	Peak position
UK Albums (Official Charts Company)	136
UK R&B Albums (Official Charts)	12
US Billboard 200	54
US Independent Albums (Billboard)	11
US Top R&B/Hip-Hop Albums (Billboard)	8
US Top Rap Albums (Billboard)	7

=== Year-end charts ===
Chart (2012)	Position
US Top R&B/Hip-Hop Albums (Billboard)	105
