= The Dena Tape =

Mixtape by Hodgy Beats
- Released: July 7, 2009
- Recorded: 2007–2009
- Genre: Hip-hop
- Length: 72:49
- Label: Self-released
- Producer: Tyler, the Creator; Left Brain; J Hawk; Brandun DeShay; Taj Moore; Hodgy Beats; Syd tha Kyd; Luke Hedges; Marz

Hodgy Beats chronology
The Dena Tape (2009)	Untitled (2012)

Professional ratings
Review scores
Source	Rating
Pitchfork	negative

The Dena Tape is the debut mixtape by American rapper Hodgy Beats. It was self-released on July 7, 2009. It is also the first solo project from any Odd Future member, with its only predecessor being The Odd Future Tape. It stood as the only solo project from Hodgy Beats until three years later, when he released Untitled in early 2012.

== Reception ==
The Dena Tape is considered to be the weakest project from any Odd Future member, from critics and fans alike. Pitchfork wrote on the mixtape, stating

Hodgy's debut mixtape features almost no guest verses, and Hodgy just wasn't far along enough as a rapper to warrant an hour-long album to himself. Hodgy's far from the crew's most charismatic rapper, and his sleepy behind-the-beat delivery works best when it's used as a foil to Tyler's manic ferocity. The Dena Tape is just as much mixtape as album, with Hodgy rapping over tracks like Jamie Foxx's "Blame It" and Jay-Z's "Ignorant Shit" along with all the drunken-synth Odd Future tracks you'd expect. But Hodgy raps here like someone who doesn't even remotely care about rapping. He wouldn't hit his stride until he linked up with non-rapping producer Left Brain to form MellowHype, where Hodgy's lazy delivery becomes a part of Left Brain's sonic universe. MellowHype's debut album YelloWhite would come not long after The Dena Tape, and there's a world of progress in between the two releases. As it is, The Dena Tape stands as maybe the single biggest outright dud in the Odd Future catalog.

== Track listing ==
No.	Title	Producer(s)	Length
1.	"Tapetro"	Tyler, the Creator	2:11
2.	"Blame It"		2:25
3.	"Chris Sawyer"	J Dilla	2:15
4.	"Rolex"	Left Brain	3:20
5.	"Biscuits"	Tyler, the Creator	3:04
6.	"Change It Up"	J Hawk	3:05
7.	"Customized Greatly"	Tyler, the Creator	5:02
8.	"Ignorant Shit"		2:51
9.	"Claustroflowbic" (featuring Left Brain)	Left Brain	3:34
10.	"Memorex Cds"	Brandun DeShay	2:48
11.	"Contrasting Swagg" (featuring Karma)	Taj Moore	4:20
12.	"Speed Racer"	Hodgy Beats	3:52
13.	"Black Magic"	Syd tha Kyd	1:46
14.	"Work That Shit"	J Hawk	3:08
15.	"Pink Magic" (featuring Casey Veggies)	Brandun DeShay	3:21
16.	"April Fools"	Tyler, the Creator	3:43
17.	"Cannon"		2:56
18.	"The Love"	Left Brain	3:48
19.	"Skinny Rapper"	Taj Moore	4:50
20.	"Pink Leather Intestines"	Luke Hedges	3:11
21.	"Interlude"	Marz	2:08
22.	"Sorry"	Tyler, the Creator	4:26
Total length:			72:49
