= Brandun DeShay =

American rapper and record producer (born 1990)

brandUn DeShay
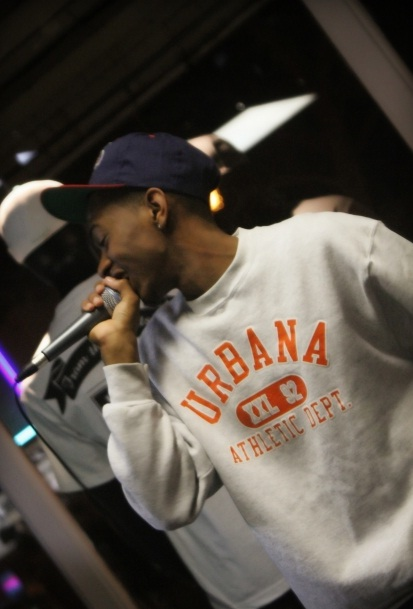
- DeShay performing in 2010

Background information
- Also known as: All Day DeShay; DeShay Ali; Ace Hashimoto
- Born: Brandun DeShay; May 10, 1990 (age 36); Chicago, Illinois, U.S.
- Genres: Hip hop; R&B; pop; K-pop; Shibuya-Kei; soul; funk; jazz; neo soul
- Occupations: Rapper; songwriter; record producer; music video director; Singer-songwriter; musician; actor
- Instruments: Vocals; piano; keyboard; guitar; drums; percussion
- Years active: 2008–present
- Labels: Seven7Ceven; Toy's Factory; BMG; Sony Music Entertainment Japan
- Formerly of: Odd Future
- Website: instagram.com/brandundeshay

Brandun DeShay (born May 10, 1990), stylized as brandUn DeShay, is an American rapper and record producer from Chicago, Illinois. He produced for all of his releases. Aside from his solo career, DeShay was an early member of the Los Angeles-based hip hop collective Odd Future.

== Career ==
DeShay began his career as music producer in 2008, later working with artists such as SZA, Kendrick Lamar, Joey Badass, Curren$y, Dom Kennedy, Mac Miller, Action Bronson, Chance The Rapper, and Danny Brown. Since 2008, DeShay began collaborating with, then later joining as one of the early members of the hip hop collective Odd Future. DeShay appeared on multiple projects from the collective, including Tyler, The Creator's first solo mixtape effort Bastard, before leaving the group in 2010. His first official music video, "Why You Gotta Zodiac Like That" was in rotation on mtvU.

In 2011, he released his fifth mixtape All Day DeShay: AM on his label Seven7Ceven Music. It was well received by fans and critics. Following the release of the tape, DeShay was nominated for the 2012 XXL Freshman list.

== Style and influences ==
In an interview with MTV UK, DeShay said that Pharrell Williams and Yasutaka Nakata's music inspired him. He also stated that N.E.R.D, Kanye West, MF Doom, Lupe Fiasco, A Tribe Called Quest and Lil Wayne were some of his influences initially.

== Personal life ==
DeShay was romantically involved with American model and former ex-girlfriend of Jaden Smith, Sarah Snyder from 2013 to 2014. In 2014, he met Los Angeles marketing director of Popular Demand, Monica Lin, whom he dated until 2016.

== Discography ==
=== Studio albums ===
- All Day DeShay: AM (2011)
- goldUn child (2015)
- goldUn child 2 (2016)
- PLAY.MAKE.BELIEVE (as Ace Hashimoto) (2021)

=== Extended plays ===
- The Super D3Shay (with The Jet Age of Tomorrow as The Super D3Shay) (2009)

=== Mixtapes ===
- Volume: One! for the Money (2008)
- Volume: Two! for the Show (2009)
- Volume: Three! to Get Ready (2010)

=== Guest appearances ===
Title	Year	Artist(s)	Album
"Session"	2009 (later removed and replaced)	Tyler, The Creator, Hodgy Beats	Bastard
"Westside"	2016	Van Ness Wu 吳建豪	#MWHYB
"Serendipity"	2016	starRo	Monday
"Natural"	2016	Moe Shop	Non-album single
"Funktion"	2016	Kero One	Reflection Eternal

=== Songwriting ===
Year	Title	Artist	Label
2017	"Bad Habits"	Crazyboy/Elly of J-Soul Brothers	Avex Japan
2017	"Route 66 (Live Version)"	Exile the Second	Avex Japan
2024	"Maze Maker"	Punipuni Denki	Tsubame Productions
2024	"SPOTLIGHT"	King & Prince	Starto Entertainment
2024	"Wonderland"	Yo-Sea	AOTL
2024	"Speed Run"	8TURN	Stone Music Entertainment
2025	"Dark Heroes"	Super Dragon	Stardust Promotion
2025	"片道夜行/Highway"	Daito Yamamoto	Space Shower Records
2026	"My Job"	Star Wish	BMSG
