= Tay Walker =

American singer

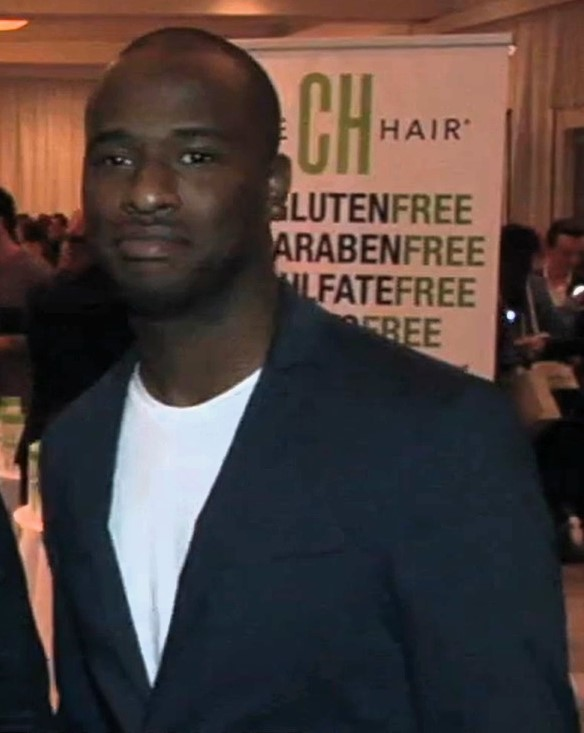
- Tay Walker in 2017

Background information
- Also known as: Lux
- Born: Taylor Walker; November 27, 1992 (age 33); Inglewood, California, United States
- Genres: Hip hop; neo soul; pop; R&B
- Occupations: Singer; songwriter; record producer
- Instruments: Vocals; keyboards; drums; guitar
- Years active: 2011–present
- Labels: Luxury Productions Inc.; Maybach Music Group (former); FanKlub Ent
- Formerly of: The Internet

Taylor Walker (born November 27, 1992) is an American singer, songwriter, and record producer from Inglewood, California. Taylor performed as a writer, keyboardist and vocalist on The Internet's debut album Purple Naked Ladies as well as playing keyboards in the music video for "Objects in the Mirror" from the Mac Miller album Watching Movies With The Sound Off. In 2015 Walker released his debut solo album 25 Hours A Day, independently.

== Early life ==
Tay Walker was born in Inglewood, California and eldest of three, having two younger brothers. His mother was a musician who used to sing to him, he began singing in the 3rd or 4th grade singing with his mother. Walker's mother introduced him to Motown and The Funk Brothers. Walker self-taught piano player as well as a vocalist, in response, his mother put him in piano classes and the choir as a child.

== Career ==
March 23, 2013 Tay Walker submitted an audition for a Tiny Desk Concert performance. The video was filmed in a middle school music room.

May 28, 2013 - Walker appeared in Mac Miller's, The Space Migration Sessions - "Objects in the Mirror" playing the keyboard as a member of The Internet. Later that year Walker would perform on Jimmy Kimmel Live with Miller.

On August 26, 2017, Walker appeared on Signed, a VH1 Television series where Rick Ross, The Dream and Lenny S, mentor aspiring artists and eventually offered him a place on their respective labels (MMG, Radio Killa Records, and Roc Nation). Tay Walker - one of the winners of the tv show - was offered a deal with MMG.

December 14, 2020 - Tay Walker was photographed in the studio with Kes Kross, Dr. Dre and Walker's manager.

== Influences ==
Tay Walker lists Stevie Wonder and many Motown artists as influences as well as Tyrese Gibson, Michael Jackson, Alicia Keys, Brian McKnight and Jamie Foxx. Walker also listens to a lot of R&B, Jazz, and Neo Soul artists.

== Discography ==
=== Studio albums ===
List of albums, with year released
Title	Album details
25 Hours A Day (25HAD)	Released: April 30, 2015 (digital) February 2, 2015 (physical); Label: Luxury Productions Inc (LPI); Formats: CD, digital download
One Way Street to Nowhere	Released: May 25, 2018 (digital); Label: Luxury Productions Inc (LPI); Formats: digital download
Lux	Released: April 1, 2020 (digital); Label: Lux Ent. Fanklub; Formats: digital download

=== EPs ===
List of extended plays, with year released
Title	Album details
Tay Walker EP	Released: August 6, 2013; Label: Luxury Productions Inc (LPI); Formats: Digital download

=== Singles ===
List of singles, with selected chart positions and certifications, showing year released and album name
Title	Year	Peak chart positions		Album
Title	Year	US	CAN	Album
"Dreaming"	2013	—	—	25 Hours A Day
"Karma"	2014	—	—	25 Hours A Day
"Waste Of Time"	2015	—	—	25 Hours A Day

=== Featured Singles ===
List of singles, with selected chart positions and certifications, showing year released and album name
Title	Year	Peak chart positions		Album
Title	Year	US	CAN	Album
"You Don't Even Know"	2013	—	—	Feel Good
"They Say"	2012	—	—	Purple Naked Ladies
"They Say/Shangrila"	2011	—	—	

=== Guest appearances ===
List of guest appearances, with other performing artists, showing year released and album name
Title	Year	Artist(s)	Album
"They Say / Shangrila"	2011	The Internet	Purple Naked Ladies
"You Don't Even Know"	2013	The Internet	Feel Good
"Runnin'"	2013	The Internet	Feel Good
"Follow Me"	2014	Domo Genesis	Under the Influence 2
"Would You Believe Me"	2023	Marcus Orelias	
