= No Idols =

Mixtape by Domo Genesis and Alchemist
- Released: August 1, 2012 (original release); April 20, 2023 (reissue)
- Recorded: 2011–12
- Genres: Alternative hip-hop; psychedelic hip-hop; jazz rap
- Length: 33:46
- Labels: Odd Future; Genesis Music; ALC
- Producer: The Alchemist

Domo Genesis chronology
Under the Influence (2011)	No Idols (2012)	Under the Influence 2 (2014)

Alchemist chronology
Russian Roulette (2012)	No Idols (2012)	Rare Chandeliers (2012)

Alternative cover
- First vinyl cover

Singles from No Idols
- 1. "Elimination Chamber" Released: July 16, 2012

No Idols is the collaborative mixtape by rapper Domo Genesis and record producer the Alchemist. It was released on August 1, 2012, by Odd Future Records and ALC Records. The mixtape was entirely produced by Alchemist and features guest appearances from Earl Sweatshirt, Vince Staples, Action Bronson, Smoke DZA, Freddie Gibbs, Prodigy, SpaceGhostPurrp and Tyler, the Creator.

== Release and promotion ==
The lead single "Elimination Chamber", a posse cut featuring Earl Sweatshirt, Vince Staples and Action Bronson, was released on July 16, 2012. The limited vinyl edition of the mixtape was released on October 1, 2013.

A second vinyl reissue with new cover art and a bonus track, "Drugs Got Me Spiritual", alongside an official CD and streaming release, occurred on April 20, 2023. The Remy Banks-assisted bonus track "Drugs Got Me Spiritual" was first released as a non-album single on April 20, 2013.

== Popularity ==
This album is considered to be Domo Genesis' most popular. "Till' the Angels Come" with Freddie Gibbs and Prodigy of Mobb Deep is the most popular track on the album with over 3 million streams, while the most streamed is the opening track "Prophecy" with 13 million streams

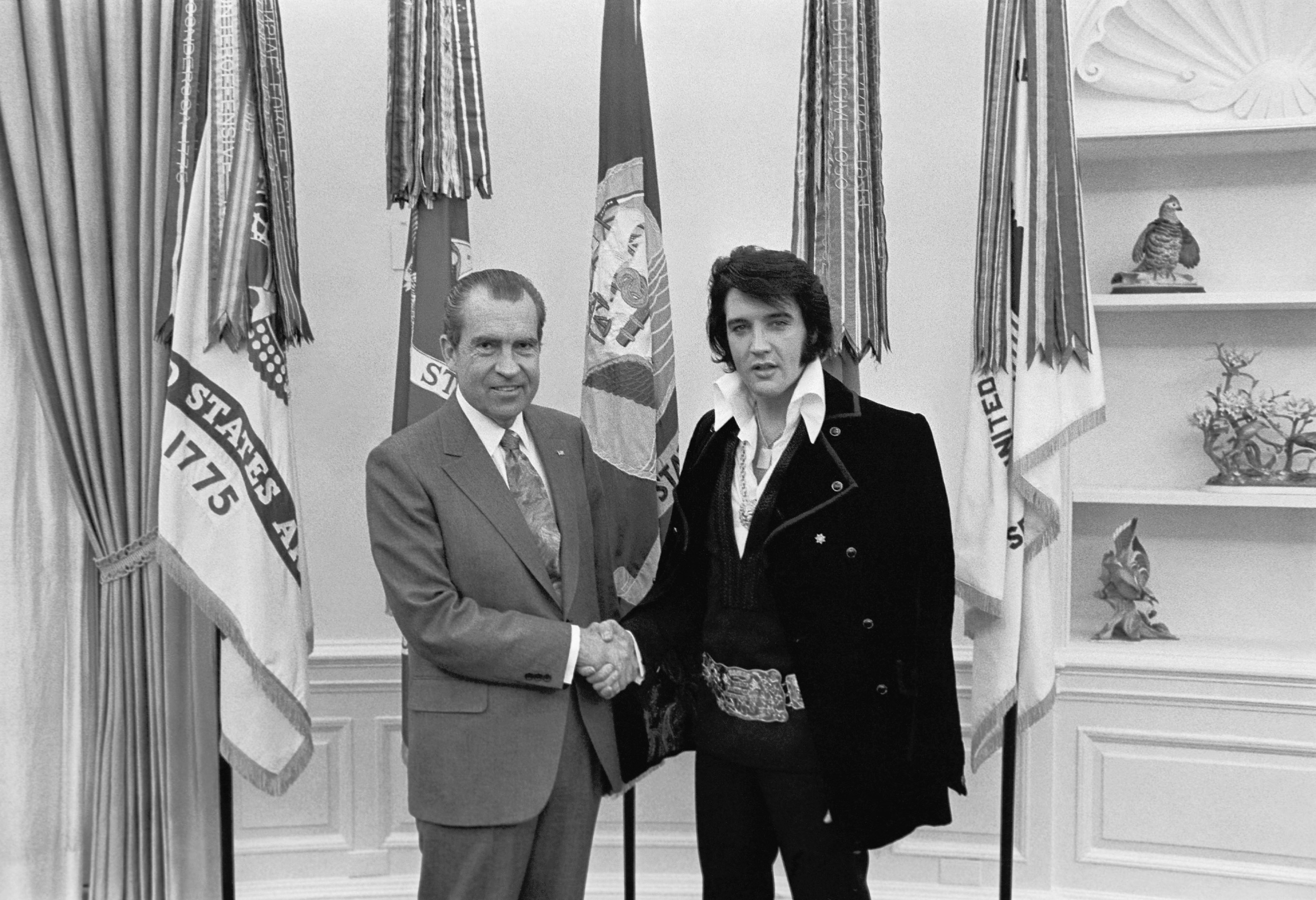
The vinyl edition is a photo of president Richard Nixon meeting Elvis Presley.

== Cover art ==
The standard version of the cover is originally from a panel of the manga Cage of Eden, and the vinyl cover features the photo of U.S. president Richard Nixon meeting Elvis Presley. The 2023 re-release was designed by Artbyshk. It is a mixture of two images, a frame from the 1991 movie JFK, and the default wallpaper for Windows XP.

== Track listing ==
- All tracks are written by Dominique Cole and Alan Maman, with additional contributors noted.
- All tracks are produced by the Alchemist.

No Idols standard edition
No.	Title	Writer(s)	Length
1.	"Prophecy"		2:19
2.	"Fuck Everybody Else"	Vyron Turner	2:25
3.	"All Alone"		2:52
4.	"Elimination Chamber" (featuring Earl Sweatshirt, Vince Staples and Action Bronson)	Thebe Kgositsile; Vincent Staples; Ariyan Arslani	3:44
5.	"Power Ballad" (featuring Smoke DZA)	Sean Pompey	2:30
6.	"Me and My Bitch"		2:59
7.	"Till the Angels Come" (featuring Freddie Gibbs and Prodigy)	Fredrick Tipton; Albert Johnson	4:36
8.	"The Daily News" (featuring SpaceGhostPurrp, Earl Sweatshirt and Action Bronson)	Markese Rolle; Kgositsile; Arslani	3:10
9.	"Gamebreaker" (featuring Earl Sweatshirt)	Kgositsile	2:28
10.	"The Feeling"		3:04
11.	"No Idols" (featuring Tyler, the Creator)	Tyler Okonma	3:46
Total length:			33:46

2023 re-release bonus track
No.	Title	Writer(s)	Length
12.	"Drugs Got Me Spiritual" (featuring Remy Banks)	Remy Banks	2:49
Total length:			36:24

Notes

- "Fuck Everybody Else" features additional vocals by Left Brain.
