= BlackenedWhite =

2010 hip-hop studio album by MellowHype

Studio album by MellowHype
- Released: October 31, 2010
- Recorded: May–October 2010
- Genre: Alternative hip-hop
- Length: 45:03
- Producer: Left Brain

MellowHype chronology
YelloWhite (2010)	BlackenedWhite (2010)	MellowHypeWeek (2012)

Singles from BlackenedWhite
- 1. "Right Here" Released: October 14, 2010

BlackenedWhite is the debut studio album by Odd Future sub-group MellowHype. Production for the album was handled by Left Brain. It was made available for free download October 31, 2010, and re-released on July 12, 2011, through Fat Possum Records.

== Release ==
=== Singles ===
The first single "Right Here" was released on October 14, 2010.

== Track listing ==
All tracks are produced by Left Brain.

No.	Title	Length
1.	"Primo"	2:13
2.	"Gunsounds"	2:43
3.	"Brain" (featuring Domo Genesis)	2:30
4.	"Loaded" (featuring Mike G)	4:23
5.	"Hell" (featuring Frank Ocean)	3:34
6.	"Deaddeputy"	2:26
7.	"Right Here"	3:11
8.	"Loco"	3:54
9.	"Stripclub"	3:00
10.	"Fuck the Police" (featuring Tyler, the Creator)	3:12
11.	"Chordaroy" (featuring Earl Sweatshirt and Tyler, the Creator)	5:01
12.	"Rico" (featuring Frank Ocean)	3:07
13.	"Gram"	1:36
14.	"Circus"	3:07
15.	"Based" (featuring C. Renee)	1:42
Total length:		45:03

== Re-release ==
BlackenedWhite (Re-release)

Studio album by MellowHype
- Released: July 12, 2011
- Studios: The Trap (Los Angeles, California)
- Genre: Alternative hip-hop
- Length: 31:07
- Label: Fat Possum
- Producers: Left Brain; Tyler, the Creator

MellowHype chronology
BlackenedWhite (2010)	BlackenedWhite (Re-release) (2011)	MellowHypeWeek (2012)

Singles from BlackenedWhite (Re-release)
- 1. "64" Released: June 13, 2011

The mixtape was re-released on July 12, 2011, by Fat Possum Records, without the song "Chordaroy" because the label did not have permission to use Earl Sweatshirt's vocals.

=== Singles ===
The first single for the re-release, "64", was released on June 13, 2011. The music video of the single was released on the same day.

== Track listing ==
All tracks are produced by Left Brain, except "Game" produced by Tyler, the Creator.

No.	Title	Writer(s)	Length
1.	"Primo"	Vyron Turner; Gerard Long	2:13
2.	"Gunsounds"	Turner; Long	2:45
3.	"Brain" (featuring Domo Genesis)	Turner; Long; Dominique Cole	2:31
4.	"64"	Turner; Long	2:57
5.	"Loaded" (featuring Mike G)	Turner; Long; Mike Griffin II	4:24
6.	"Deaddeputy"	Turner; Long	1:59
7.	"Right Here"	Turner; Long	3:12
8.	"Igotagun"	Turner; Long	2:06
9.	"F666 the Police" (featuring Tyler, the Creator)	Turner; Long; Tyler Okonma	3:14
10.	"Rico" (featuring Frank Ocean)	Turner; Long; Christopher Breaux	2:37
11.	"Circus"	Turner; Long	3:09
Total length:			31:07

iTunes bonus track
No.	Title	Writer(s)	Length
12.	"Gunz"	Turner; Long	2:14
Total length:			33:21

Australian bonus tracks
No.	Title	Writer(s)	Length
12.	"Game" (featuring Tyler, The Creator)	Long; Okonma	2:03
13.	"Gunz"	Turner; Long	2:14
Total length:			35:24

Notes

- The re-release does not contain the tracks "Chordaroy", "Hell", "Loco", "Stripclub", "Gram", and "Based".

== Critical response ==
Professional ratings
Aggregate scores
Source	Rating
AnyDecentMusic?	6.7/10
Metacritic	72/100
Review scores
Source	Rating
AllMusic	4/5 stars
The A.V. Club	B
Consequence of Sound	F
HipHopDX	3.5/5
Now	2/5
Pitchfork	8.0/10
RapReviews	6.5/10
Rolling Stone	3/5 stars
Slant Magazine	4/5 stars
Under the Radar	6/10

BlackenedWhite was met with generally positive reviews. At Metacritic, the album received an average score of 72, based on 21 reviews. Aggregator AnyDecentMusic? gave it 6.7 out of 10, based on their assessment of the critical consensus.

Drew Beringer from AbsolutePunk called it "the most accessible Odd Future release to date" and went on to say that it's "another strong album from the Odd Future pack". David Jeffries of AllMusic said, "The original mixtape is worth checking for the Sweatshirt bits alone, but this version does a better job of putting the spotlight on Mellowhype, the Odd Future crew's secret weapon." Evan Rytlewski of The A.V. Club said, "In spite of its marvelous production from Left Brain, who shares Tyler's ear for beautifully deformed grooves and Lex Luger's gift for epileptic bangers, BlackenedWhite doesn't boil over as maniacally as Goblin, and it never fully reaches that album's reckless highs."

Omar Burgess of HipHopDX said, "Ultimately, BlackenedWhite is conflicted, but quality music." Jordan Sargent of Pitchfork said, "The catch-22 for MellowHype is that while their centrism certainly has its merits, their music is unlikely to convert anyone that has, at this point, already written off Odd Future. Which leaves them with a solid, fun rap album to satiate a feverish cult and a growing number of casual fans." Steve "Flash" Juon of RapReviews said, "It's clearly a release intended for hardcore Odd Future fans." Huw Jones of Slant Magazine said, "The duo strikes a fine working relationship throughout BlackenedWhite too, with Left ensuring his colleague's standout bars are accentuated with a quirky sample or a sudden key change. In all, this is a far more accessible affair than Goblin; it never comes close to being as downright offensive, and Hodgy's breezy flow helps make this a far easier album to digest."

Chris Martins of Spin said, "Producer Left Brain breaks ground on bangers that stitch ambient electronica to cracked G-funk, while Hodgy sports the casual swag of Wiz Khalifa or Lil Wayne, with a less cringe-worthy sense of humor than his peers." Jason Richards of Now said, "There's the occasional clever turn of phrase, but MellowHype's brand of vulgarity is subtler and less arresting than Tyler's." Matthew Trammell from Rolling Stone calling it "L.A. gangsta rap for the swag generation that die-hard fans will eagerly lap up". Alex Young of Consequence of Sound said, "The reissue of BlackenedWhite comes as a missed opportunity. Odd Future followers will likely have grabbed the expanded (and notably better) version when it was available free online a few months back; newcomers to the collective's output have better entry points elsewhere in their continuously-growing catalog."

== Commercial performance ==
BlackenedWhite debuted at number 81 on the US Billboard 200 with first-week sales of 6,000 copies in the United States.

== Charts ==
Chart (2011)	Peak position
US Billboard 200	81
US Top R&B/Hip-Hop Albums (Billboard)	19
US Independent Albums (Billboard)	18
