= Jonti =

- Also known as: Jonti Danimals
- Born: Jonti Danilewitz; 1986 or 1987 (age 38–39); Johannesburg, Gauteng, South Africa
- Origin: Sydney, New South Wales, Australia
- Genres: Electronic; alternative hip hop
- Occupations: Musician; record producer; songwriter
- Instruments: Synthesizer; ukulele; sampler
- Years active: 2009–present
- Label: Stones Throw
- Formerly of: Danimals, Sherlock's Daughter

Jonti Danilewitz (born 1986 or 1987), known mononymously as Jonti, is a South African-Australian electronic and alternative hip hop record producer, composer and songwriter. He is signed to Stones Throw Records and Future Classic. He was also a touring member of the Avalanches.

== Biography ==
Danilewitz was born in Johannesburg, South Africa. His family relocated to Sydney, where he attended Masada College, Sydney in 1999. By 2009, he fronted the Sydney-based group Danimals, which were working at Mark Ronson's The Lab to write and record material. Danilewitz' older brother Leron was their talent manager. One of the tracks, "Fox", was used for a national advertising campaign. Danimals line-up in mid-2010 included James Domeyko, Moses MacRae and Julian Sudek on drums and Jaie Gonzalez on bass guitar. Due to the United States yoghurt of the same name they changed to Djanimals.

As Jonti Danimal, on keyboards, he was also a member of Sherlock's Daughter, an indie, electronic six-piece alongside Liam Flanagan on bass guitar, Tanya Horo on vocals, guitar and keyboards, Timothy Maybury on guitar, Graeme Pillemer and William Russell on drums. That group formed in 2007 by Horo, Maybury and Pillemer with Jonti joining later. They recorded their debut album, Hunter, during 2010 with sessions at Watermusic Studios, Hoboken. It was issued in 2012 via Gaga Digi.

Danilewitz was performing as Jonti by November 2012. His debut album, Twirligig, had appeared a year earlier in October 2011. AllMusic's David Jeffries rated it four-out-of-five stars, who explained "this genre-borrowing hangs together effortlessly with Jonti's unique voice as its anchor, so let your laptop-hovering friends worry about the complex constructions while you enjoy Twirligig's simple pleasures".

In 2014, Jonti performed a cover of the Avalanches debut album, Since I Left You, at Vivid LIVE and the Melbourne International Arts Festival. In 2016, he appeared on their album Wildflower and later becoming their touring guitarist.

His second album, Tokorats, was released in 2017. Jeffries' colleague David Simpson gave it three-and-a-half because "not all of his juxtapositions or segues seem to make sense, and the album seems a bit overstuffed, but Jonti's ambition and creativity are undeniably admirable, and the entire album is a delightfully strange trip".

== Discography ==
=== Studio albums ===
Title	Details
Twirligig	Release date: 10 October 2011; Label: Mistletone (MIST053) / Stones Throw; Formats: CD, LP, digital download
Tokorats	Release date: 3 November 2017; Label: Future Classic / Stones Throw; Formats: CD, digital download, streaming

=== Demos ===
Title	Details
Sine & Moon	Release date: 2012 (US); Label: Stones Throw Records (STH2290); Formats: LP, digital download

=== Singles ===
Title	Year	Album
"Firework Spraying Moon"	2011	Twirlgig
"Saturday Night"	2012	Sine & Moon
"Scrood"	2017	non album singles
"Rain"	2017	non album singles
"Sleeping and Falling"	2017	Tokorats
"Staring Window"	2017	Tokorats

== Awards ==
=== AIR Awards ===
The Australian Independent Record Awards (commonly known informally as AIR Awards) is an annual awards night to recognise, promote and celebrate the success of Australia's Independent Music sector.

Year	Nominee / work	Award	Result
2012	Twirlgig	Best Independent Dance/Electronic Album	Nominated
