= MellowHype =

American hip-hop duo from California

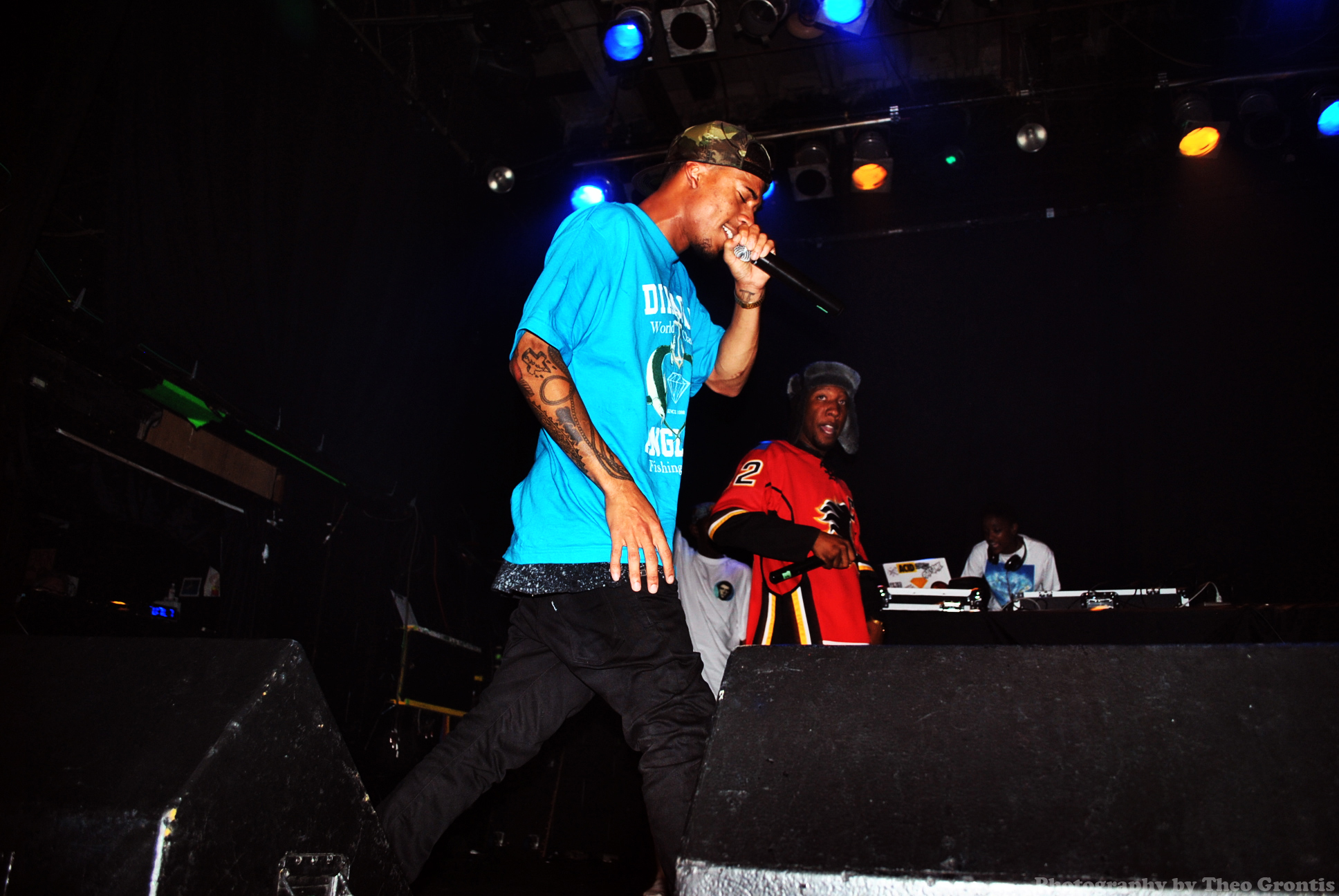
- MellowHype performing in Toronto with Odd Future, 2011

Background information
- Origin: Los Angeles, California, United States
- Genres: Hip-hop; alternative hip-hop
- Years active: 2007–2014; 2017–2018; 2022
- Labels: Odd Future; Sony; RED; Fat Possum
- Spinoffs: MellowHigh
- Spinoff of: Odd Future
- Past members: Hodgy; Left Brain
- Website: oddfuture.com

MellowHype was an American hip-hop duo from Los Angeles, California, that consisted of rapper-producer Hodgy (Gerard Long) and producer-rapper Left Brain (Vyron Turner). Both were members of hip-hop collective Odd Future. They have released two studio albums, which both charted on the Billboard 200 albums chart, and four mixtapes.

== History ==
=== Early years (2006–2010) ===
Left Brain and Hodgy Beats were already making music independently of each other when they first met and began collaborating around 2006 or 2007. MellowHype consists of Left Brain (Mellow) producing and Hodgy Beats (Hype) rapping.

Although Hodgy Beats and Left Brain were both featured on the first two Odd Future mixtapes, their debut as MellowHype came with their debut mixtape, YelloWhite. The mixtape was released on February 24, 2010. The group was later featured on Domo Genesis's debut mixtape Rolling Papers on the track "Basic Bitch". Their debut studio album, BlackenedWhite was released on October 31, 2010, for free online.

=== BlackenedWhite re-release (2011–2012) ===
In early 2011, MellowHype gained massive popularity, along with the rest of Odd Future following the release of Tyler, the Creator's single, "Yonkers".

On April 5, 2011, MellowHype performed the song "64" with Mississippi-based grunge labelmates Bass Drum of Death on the Fuel TV program The Daily Habit. They also performed their song "65" alongside Tyler, the Creator for the BBC music showcase.

On July 12, 2011, the duo re-released a remastered version of BlackenedWhite on Fat Possum Records along with a music video for the lead single, "64".

=== Numbers and MellowHypeWeek (2012) ===
On August 16 of the same year, a song titled "67" was released through Hodgy Beats' Tumblr. They began to hint at an album titled Numbers and released several more songs containing numbers in the titles. On January 4, 2012, MellowHype digitally released the song "45" through Hodgy Beats' Tumblr. On July 13, 2012, MellowHype released the song "FAKUOY" through Hodgy Beats' Tumblr. The song was speculated to be on Numbers, however, it was later revealed to not be on the track listing.

It was later announced that Numbers would be released on October 2, 2012, however, the release date was pushed back to October 9, 2012, the same day as the release of fellow Odd Future Records members Trash Talk's album 119. The first official single for Numbers, "La Bonita", was released on July 18, 2012. The album features Frank Ocean, Mike G, and Earl Sweatshirt.

On August 5, 2012, Hodgy announced a MellowHype mixtape set to release September 11 via Twitter. It was later revealed that MellowHype would instead be releasing one track per day for seven days starting on September 11, 2012. The songs released were "Decoy", "Greezy", "Wasabi", "Godsss", "F", "LP", and "WHAT". Domo Genesis and Juicy J made guest appearances on the tracks "Greezy" and "Wasabi", respectively.

=== MellowHigh, I Need Some Answers, and break-up (2013–2015) ===
On April 20, 2013, MellowHigh, which is a trio consisting of Hodgy, Left Brain, and Domo Genesis, released their first single and music video entitled "Troublesome 2013". On August 24, 2013, it was revealed their debut album by the group MellowHigh would be released on October 31, 2013. The group also released promotional vlogs leading up to the release, showing footage of them on the Odd Future European tour 2013 and recording the project. Over the following months they periodically released songs via SoundCloud. On October 10, 2013, the music video for "Yu" was released. It was revealed MellowHigh would contain guest appearances by Tyler, the Creator, Curren$y, Smoke DZA, Earl Sweatshirt, and Remy Banks. Upon its release, the album debuted at number 89 on the US Billboard 200. On June 9, 2014, MellowHype announced their next mixtape, INSA (I Need Some Answers), would be released on July 4, 2014.

On January 18, 2015, Hodgy Beats confirmed that MellowHype would no longer exist. Although he and Left Brain would continue to make music together, just no longer under the name MellowHype. Hodgy states in the interview, "Nah, we ain't breaking up. Nah, this ain't no weirdo shit. It's just some real shit. It's a refocus. Going from boys to men this is what it is. So it's either understand it, 'cause it will be explained–cry about it, talk shit, applaud us–we still moving."

=== Reunion (2017–present) ===
On February 6, 2017, MellowHype announced they were working together again for Left Brain's Mind Gone Volume 1.

== In popular culture ==
The soundtrack from Madden NFL 12 features MellowHype's song "On Ya Mind". Hodgy Beats stated on Tumblr that the song was made with Left Brain in high school.

== Discography ==
Studio albums

- BlackenedWhite (re-release) (2011)
- Numbers (2012)

Mixtapes

- YelloWhite (2010)
- BlackenedWhite (2010)
- MellowHypeWeek (2012)
- INSA (I Need Some Answers) (2014)

=== with Odd Future ===
Studio albums

- The OF Tape Vol. 2 (2012)

Mixtapes

- The Odd Future Tape (2008)

Compilations

- 12 Odd Future Songs (2011)

=== with Domo Genesis as MellowHigh ===
Studio albums

- MellowHigh (2013)
