= Rolling Papers (mixtape) =

Mixtape by Domo Genesis
- Released: August 30, 2010
- Recorded: 2009–10
- Genre: Hip hop
- Length: 37:01
- Label: Self-released
- Producer: Left Brain; Syd tha Kyd; Tyler, the Creator

Domo Genesis chronology
Rolling Papers (2010)	Under the Influence (2011)

Rolling Papers is the debut mixtape by American rapper Domo Genesis. The mixtape was self-released for free on Odd Future's Tumblr page on August 30, 2010. The mixtape's production was handled by Left Brain, Syd tha Kyd, and Tyler, the Creator.

== Reception ==
Pitchfork Media on the album: "Rolling Papers peaks high with "Super Market", a skit-song in which Domo cuts off Tyler in a grocery-store line, leading to an epically ridiculous battle-rap throwdown that ends when Tyler leaves on an evil walrus named Rufus and Domo turns into a zombie. Deep-voiced, sleepy-eyed Domo doesn't have the magnetic bloodlust of the rest of the crew; most of the time, he just wants to puff away in peace. The production is dazed, MF Doom-esque psych-rap—good for vibe, not close attention—and Domo's voice, usually deep in the mix, works just the same. If you're in the right mood, Rolling Papers wafts past nicely. If you're not, things get boring fast."

== Track listing ==
No.	Title	Writer(s)	Producer	Length
1.	"First Roll"		Tyler, the Creator	0:20
2.	"Buzzin"	Dominique Cole; Tyler Okonma	Tyler, the Creator	2:22
3.	"Domier"	Cole; Vyron Turner	Left Brain	1:44
4.	"Rolling Papers" (featuring Tyler, the Creator)	Cole; Okonma	Tyler, the Creator	2:51
5.	"Dreams"	Cole; Okonma; Sydney Bennett	Tyler, the Creator; Syd tha Kyd	1:16
6.	"Cap N Crunch"	Cole; Okonma	Tyler, the Creator	1:25
7.	"SteamRoller" (featuring Hodgy Beats and Frank Ocean)	Cole; Gerard Long; Christopher Breaux; Okonma	Tyler, the Creator	4:42
8.	"Kickin It"	Cole; Okonma	Tyler, the Creator	2:16
9.	"Super Market" (featuring Tyler, the Creator)	Cole; Okonma; Turner	Left Brain	4:10
10.	"Drunk" (featuring Mike G)	Cole; Michael Griffin II; Okonma	Tyler, the Creator	5:35
11.	"Clear Eyes"	Cole; Okonma	Tyler, the Creator	2:05
12.	"Basic Bitch" (featuring MellowHype)	Cole; Long; Turner	Left Brain	3:28
13.	"Last Roll"		Tyler, the Creator	4:47

Notes

- "First Roll" features uncredited vocals by L-Boy and Jasper Dolphin
- "Drunk" features uncredited vocals by Tyler, the Creator and Hodgy Beats
- "Last Roll" features uncredited vocals by Bob Marley
- The instrumental to “Last Roll” is the instrumental to an unreleased Tyler, The Creator song called “Suicidal Thoughts”

== Personnel ==
Credits adapted from Discogs.

- Domo Genesis - vocals and songwriting on all tracks
- Tyler, the Creator - production on tracks 1, 2, 4–8, 10, 11 and 13; guest vocals on tracks 4 and 9; (Note: Tyler is credited as Wolf Haley on track 4 and as Ace Creator on track 9.) additional vocals on tracks 2, 7, 10, and 12
- Hodgy Beats - guest vocals on tracks 7 and 12; additional vocals on track 10
- Left Brain - production on tracks 3, 9 and 12
- Frank Ocean - backing vocals on track 7
- Syd Tha Kyd - co-production on track 5, additional vocals on track 9
