= Odd Future =

American hip-hop collective

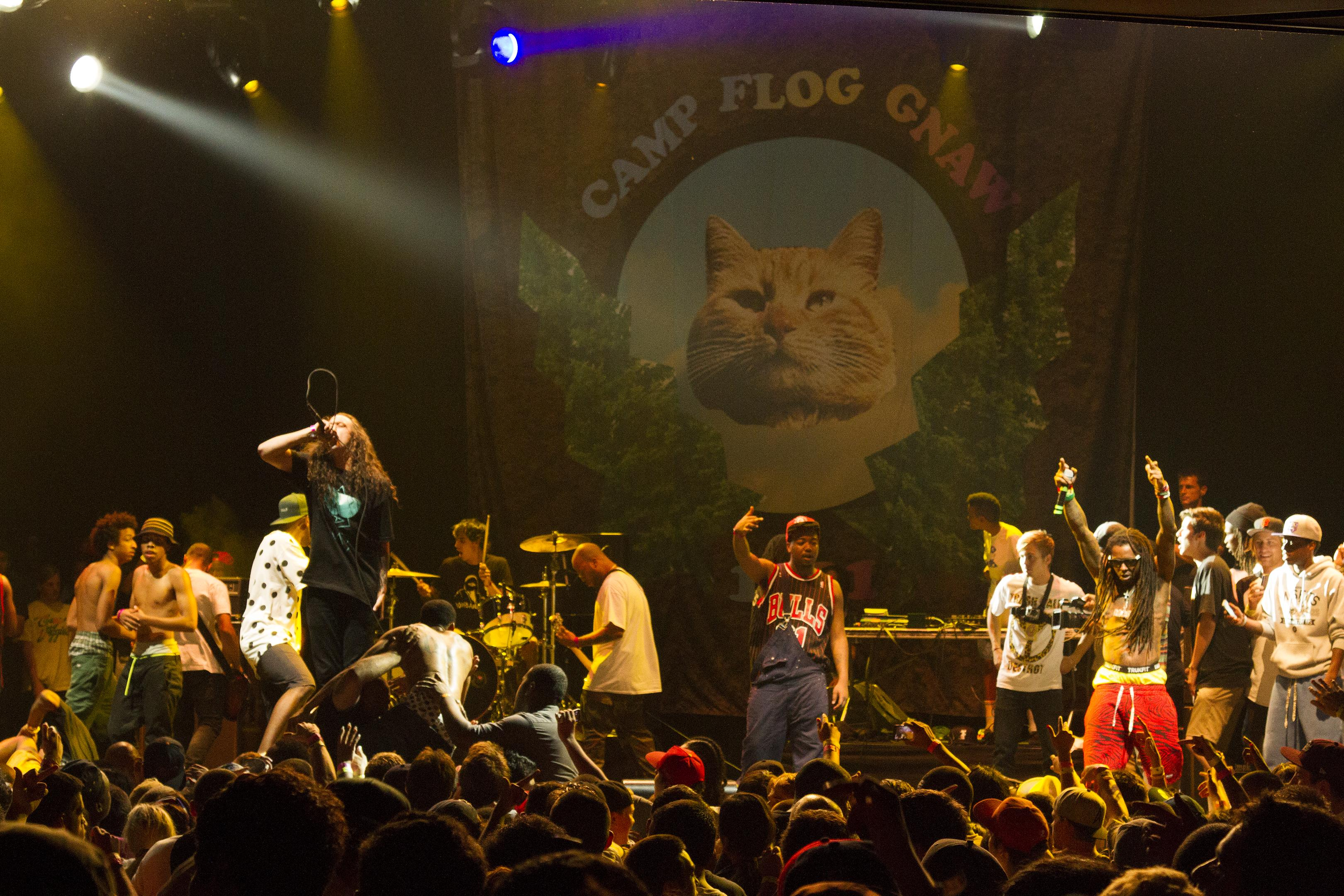
- Odd Future performing with Trash Talk and Lil Wayne at Camp Flog Gnaw Carnival 2012

Background information
- Also known as: OF; OFWGKTA; Wolf Gang
- Origin: Los Angeles, California, U.S.
- Genres: West Coast hip-hop; alternative hip-hop; horrorcore; alternative R&B
- Years active: 2007–2016; 2018; 2023
- Labels: Odd Future; Sony
- Spinoffs: MellowHype; The Jet Age of Tomorrow; I Smell Panties; The Internet; MellowHigh
- Past members: Tyler, the Creator; Left Brain; Jasper Dolphin; Hodgy; Syd; Domo Genesis; Mike G Taco; Earl Sweatshirt; Frank Ocean; L-Boy; Matt Martians; Pyramid Vritra; Casey Veggies; Brandun DeShay; Na-Kel Smith; LegoHead; Sagan Lockhart; Lucas Vercetti; Julian Berman; Luis Perez
- Website: oddfuture.com

Odd Future Wolf Gang Kill Them All, simply known as Odd Future and often abbreviated as OF or OFWGKTA, was an American alternative hip-hop collective formed in Los Angeles, California, in 2007. The group consisted of rappers, singers, producers, filmmakers, skateboarders, actors, and clothing designers. The original members were Tyler, the Creator, Casey Veggies, Hodgy, Left Brain, Matt Martians, Jasper Dolphin, Travis "Taco" Bennett, and Syd. Later members included Brandun DeShay, Pyramid Vritra, Domo Genesis, Mike G, Earl Sweatshirt, L-Boy, Frank Ocean, and Na-Kel Smith.

Odd Future self-released their debut mixtape, The Odd Future Tape, in 2008, as well as various solo and collaborative projects over the subsequent years. In 2010, they then released their second mixtape, Radical, gaining a significant rise in popularity throughout the early 2010s. Their debut studio album, The OF Tape Vol. 2, was released in 2012. Aside from music, Odd Future had an Adult Swim comedy skit show, Loiter Squad, which ran from 2012 to 2014.

The official status of the group has been highly disputed. While there is no conclusive announcement signifying a breakup, the group has remained largely inactive since 2015, with many of its members suggesting that there are no plans for the collective going forward. Because of this, the group is generally considered to have disbanded. The group have performed reunion shows in 2018 and 2023.

== History ==
=== 2007–2010: Formation, early releases and rise in popularity ===
Odd Future was formed in 2007 in Los Angeles by Tyler, the Creator along with Casey Veggies, Hodgy, Left Brain, the Super 3 (Matt Martians' production trio which included fictional characters Betty Vasolean and Yoshi Jankins Jr.) and Jasper Dolphin. The entirety of the group consisted of rappers, producers, filmmakers, skateboarders, and clothing designers. The group's recording side was known for their rebellious, brutally honest, and profanity dense lyrics.

In early 2008, Casey Veggies released Customized Greatly, Vol. 1, featuring Tyler on a few tracks. On November 15, 2008, Odd Future released their debut mixtape, The Odd Future Tape.

On July 7, 2009, Hodgy released his debut mixtape, The Dena Tape. On December 25, 2009, Tyler, the Creator released his debut mixtape, Bastard. In 2008, Chicago-based rapper Brandun DeShay and Atlanta-based producer Hal Williams, known as Pyramid Vritra, joined the collective; the latter joined Matt Martians' Super 3 to form the Jet Age of Tomorrow. Martians and DeShay collaborated for a brief Extended Play known as "Super DeShay" in 2009. Earl Sweatshirt, Domo Genesis, Mike G, Frank Ocean and Na-Kel Smith joined the group between 2009 and 2010. Earl Sweatshirt's debut mixtape, Earl, was released on Tumblr in March 2010. MellowHype, a duo composed of Hodgy and Left Brain, released their debut mixtape, YelloWhite, on February 24, 2010, and their debut album, BlackenedWhite was also released in 2010. Domo Genesis released his debut mixtape, Rolling Papers on August 30, 2010, and Mike G released a mixtape, Ali, in 2010, The collective also released their second mixtape, Radical, near the middle of 2010. In November 2010, Odd Future completed a two-stop tour and the first was in London on November 5, 2010. The second was in New York City on November 8, 2010. Their concerts have been compared to punk rock shows, with stagediving, moshing, and group members antagonizing the crowd.

After releasing their 2nd mixtape Journey to the 5th Echelon, Williams and Martians were evicted from their apartment, forcing Williams to move back to Georgia, which made the group unable to attend the record label meetings and establish similar prominence to other Odd Future acts. However, the group later reconnected online to produce two Jet Age of Tomorrow projects in 2013 and 2017 respectively. In 2010, Earl Sweatshirt was sent to an at-risk teens boarding school in Samoa by his mother due to his behavior. Also in that year, Brandun Deshay was kicked out due to beef with Tyler, the Creator, and Casey Veggies left to pursue his solo career.

=== 2011–2015: Solo releases, The OF Tape Vol. 2 and Loiter Squad ===
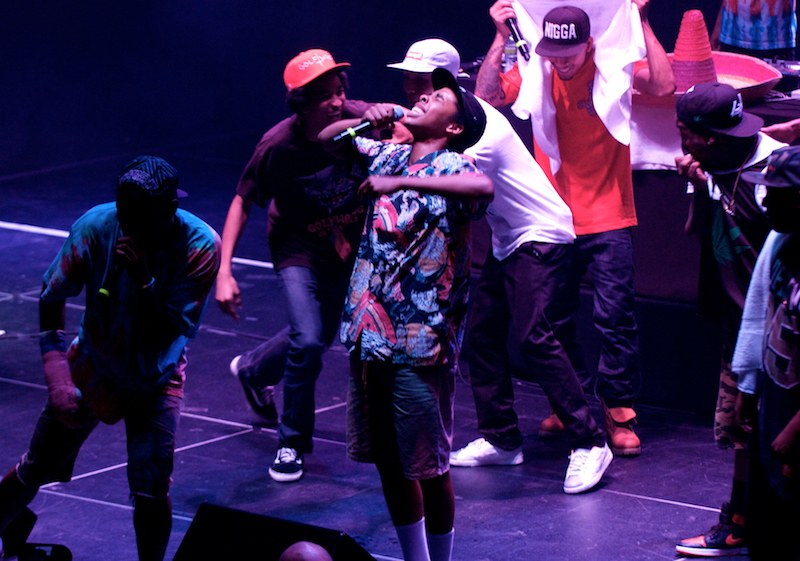
Earl Sweatshirt performing with the rest of Odd Future in March 2012

MellowHype re-released BlackenedWhite through Fat Possum Records on July 12, 2011. Frank Ocean self-released his debut mixtape, Nostalgia, Ultra, on February 16, 2011. Tyler, the Creator signed a one-album deal with XL Recordings and released his debut album, Goblin, on May 10, 2011. They gained a cult following, and received press attention from blogs and magazines. In April 2011, the group signed a deal with RED Distribution and Sony Music Entertainment to start their own label, Odd Future Records. On August 2, 2011, Odd Future announced the Golf Wang Tour 2011 on their website. The tour included 27 stops, beginning on September 28, 2011, in San Diego, California at the House of Blues.

On September 8, 2011, it was announced that Odd Future would be making a television show called Loiter Squad. The show was announced to be a sketch comedy show featuring various skits and pranks and first aired on Adult Swim in March 2012. The show featured Tyler, Jasper, Taco, Earl and Lionel as main cast members, with other members of Odd Future making cameo appearances. The program was produced by Dickhouse Productions, which is also the production company for the TV series Jackass.

On October 3, 2011, Tyler, the Creator tweeted a link to iTunes with a compilation album of songs from artists within the group such as Domo Genesis, Hodgy Beats, Mike G, the Jet Age of Tomorrow, MellowHype, the Internet, and Tyler himself. The album is simply named 12 Odd Future Songs, despite having 13 tracks, including three new releases from the Internet, Mike G and MellowHype. On March 20, 2012, the collective released their debut studio album, The OF Tape Vol. 2, as a relative sequel to the original mixtape, The Odd Future Tape. On the same day, Earl Sweatshirt, who was absent from Odd Future from June 2010 until February 2012 due to attending boarding school in Samoa, first performed with the group at the Hammerstein Ballroom in New York.

Frank Ocean released his debut studio album, Channel Orange, on July 10, 2012. Other solo releases for the second half of 2012 included Domo Genesis's No Idols with the Alchemist, released on August 1, 2012, and MellowHype's Numbers, released on October 9, 2012. On December 5, 2012, it was announced Frank Ocean was nominated for six awards at the 2013 Grammy Awards, including Best New Artist, Record of the Year for "Thinkin Bout You" and Album of the Year for Channel Orange.

On April 2, 2013, Tyler, the Creator released his completely new second studio album, Wolf, which received positive reviews from critics and debuted at number 3 on the Billboard 200, selling 89,895 copies in the United States. Earl Sweatshirt released his debut studio album, Doris, on August 20, 2013, under Columbia Records. Tyler and Earl also went on an EarlWolf Summer Tour in 2013. On October 31, 2013, MellowHigh, which consisted of Hodgy Beats, Domo Genesis, and Left Brain, released their self titled album. It received generally positive reviews and charted on No. 89 on the Billboard 200 chart.

In June 2014, Frank Ocean left Odd Future management, 4 Strikes Management. In May 2014, the third season of Loiter Squad premiered. Earl, Tyler, Jasper, Taco, and L-Boy did an in-depth interview for HuffPost Live. On August 11 and 12, 2014, Odd Future opened up for Eminem at Wembley Stadium, London.

An excerpt of a sting used on Odd Future Radio

On September 12, 2014, the Odd Future radio station premiered on Dash Radio, which was released the month before by DJ Skee. The station featured a live playlist, special links such as "Taco Tuesday" (also repeated on Fridays) and coverage of live events, such as the Camp Flog Gnaw Carnival, also hosted by Odd Future.

=== 2015–present: Decline in activity, subsequent hiatus ===
On January 18, 2015, Hodgy Beats stated that MellowHype will not release another project, but he and Left Brain will continue to make music together; "Nah, we ain't breaking up. ... It's a refocus. Going from boys to men this is what it is. So it's either understand it, 'cause it will be explained–cry about it, talk shit, applaud us–we still moving."

In May 28, 2015, Tyler, the Creator hinted on Twitter that Odd Future was breaking up, saying "although its no more, those 7 letters are forever", seemingly referring to the collective's acronym "OFWGKTA", with Earl Sweatshirt backing up Tyler's claims. Tyler later clarified that his tweets were only reminiscing about the past.

"OFWGKTA" was listed on the bill for Tyler, the Creator's 4th Annual Camp Flog Gnaw Carnival. The line-up that performed included Hodgy Beats, Domo Genesis, Mike G and Left Brain. Tyler and Earl were not included in the set due to Tyler already having a solo show and Earl being busy.

Some rumors began to circulate in 2016 about the group working together musically again after a picture was taken of Tyler, Earl, Syd, Jasper, Taco, and Matt Martians together at the Afropunk Festival.

On December 9, 2016, Hodgy released his debut studio album Fireplace: TheNotTheOtherSide, the final release under Odd Future Records. On February 6, 2017, it was confirmed MellowHype to be reuniting on Left Brain's solo mixtape MindGone Vol. 1.

Tyler, the Creator's 2017 album, Flower Boy, featured vocals by fellow Odd Future members Frank Ocean, Jasper Dolphin, and L-Boy, but was released under Columbia Records.

With the release of Tyler's 2018 single "Okra", he seems to further hint towards an Odd Future breakup with the lyric "Golf be the set, no more OF". However, later that year on August 8, Taco posted a series videos on his Instagram story, showing an Odd Future surprise concert taking place at the Low End Theory club in Los Angeles. Odd Future members who attended the show included Tyler, Taco, Jasper, Mike G, Earl, and the returning Syd and Hodgy.

In 2018, Pitchfork wrote that Odd Future's legacy was "one that demands we bask in complicated truths, reminding us that nurturing the parts that don't fit is how any culture moves forward."

On October 23, 2019, Mike G confirmed Odd Future was "still together" but that they would no longer be touring.

On February 17, 2020, Tyler confirmed Odd Future was likely not going to release another album, stating he does not think "the styles will mesh much for a good cohesive thing".

On August 19, 2023, a picture taken backstage of an Earl Sweatshirt show in Los Angeles, to commemorate 10 years since the release of 2013's Doris, showed 10 members of Odd Future together alongside Vince Staples.

== Members ==
=== Former members ===
- Tyler, the Creator – vocals, production, music video directing, fashion design (2007–2023)
- Casey Veggies – vocals (2007–2009)
- Hodgy (Hodgy Beats) – vocals, occasional production (2007–2016, 2018–2023)
- Left Brain (Vyron Turner) – production, DJ, occasional vocals (2007–2023)
- Jasper Dolphin – occasional vocals, hypeman, fashion design (2007–2023)
- Travis Bennett (Taco) – occasional vocals, DJ, fashion design (2007–2023)
- Matt Martians – production (2007–2016)
- Syd (Syd tha Kyd) – engineer, vocals, DJ, production (2007–2016, 2018–2023)
- Brandun DeShay – vocals (2008–2010)
- Pyramid Vritra – production (2008–2015)
- Domo Genesis – vocals (2009–2023)
- Mike G – vocals, DJ (2009–2023)
- Earl Sweatshirt – vocals (2009–2010; 2012–2023)
- Frank Ocean – vocals, occasional production (2009–2023)
- Na-Kel Smith – skater, hypeman, occasional vocals (2010–2015)
- Eddy Tekeli (LegoHead) – Photographer (2010–2015), fashion design (2010–2012)
- Sagan Lockhart – skater, photographer, hypeman (2010–2015)
- Lionel Boyce (L-Boy) – music video director, fashion design, occasional vocals (2011–2023)
- Lucas Vercetti – DJ, fashion design, occasional vocals (2011–2015)
- Julian Berman – photographer (2011–2015)
- Luis Perez (Panch) – cinematographer (2012–2015)

== Sub-groups ==
- MellowHype (2007–2015, 2017–2018, 2022)
  - Hodgy (vocals, occasional production)
  - Left Brain (production, occasional vocals)
- The Jet Age of Tomorrow (2007–2013, 2017)
  - Matt Martians (production, occasional vocals)
  - Pyramid Vritra (production, occasional vocals)
- I Smell Panties (2007–2008)
  - Tyler, the Creator (vocals, production)
  - Jasper Dolphin (vocals)
- The Super D3Shay (2009)
  - Matt Martians (production)
  - Brandun DeShay (vocals)
- EarlWolf (2009–2014, 2016)
  - Tyler, the Creator (vocals, production)
  - Earl Sweatshirt (vocals)
- TTDD (2010)
  - Tyler, the Creator (vocals, production)
  - Travis Bennett (vocals)
  - Jasper Dolphin (vocals)
  - Domo Genesis (vocals)
- The Internet (2011–present)
  - Syd (vocals) (2011–present)
  - Matt Martians (keyboards, vocals) (2011–present)
  - Tay Walker (keyboards) (2013–2016)
  - Jameel Bruner (keyboards) (2011–2013)
  - Patrick Paige II (bass guitar) (2013–present)
  - Christopher Smith (drums) (2013–present)
  - Steve Lacy (guitar, vocals) (2015–present)
- MellowHigh (2011–2015, 2017)
  - Hodgy (vocals, occasional production)
  - Domo Genesis (vocals)
  - Left Brain (production, occasional vocals)
- Sweaty Martians (2012–2014)
  - Earl Sweatshirt (production)
  - Matt Martians (production)
- Trashwang (2012–2014)
  - Odd Future
  - Trash Talk
- Hog Slaughta Boyz (2015)
  - Earl Sweatshirt (vocals)
  - Na-Kel Smith (vocals)

== Controversies ==
Odd Future was scheduled to appear at the February 2014 Rapture Festival in Auckland, as a supporting act to Eminem. The group was not on the original bill, but was substituting for Kendrick Lamar after the concert had been sold out. A campaign was launched by an anti-violence group to prevent Odd Future performing, based partly on prior occurrences of the group supposedly inciting violence by their fans towards members of the public, and by the group's lyrics allegedly supporting rape and violence towards women. Immigration New Zealand canceled the visa of some group members because of alleged acts of inciting violence.

In 2015, Tyler, the Creator was banned from the United Kingdom for 3–5 years due to the allegedly homophobic and violent content of his lyrics from earlier albums such as Bastard and Goblin.

Tyler's UK ban has since been lifted, concurring with his show in London to promote his sixth studio album, Igor. However, his show was forcibly cancelled by police after they voiced their safety concerns, saying that it was "overcrowded" and "too rowdy".

== Discography ==
=== Studio albums ===
List of studio albums, with selected chart positions and certifications
Title	Album details	Peak chart positions								Sales
Title	Album details	US	US R&B/HH	US Rap	AUS	CAN	DEN	NZ	UK	Sales
The OF Tape Vol. 2	Released: March 20, 2012; Label: Odd Future; Formats: CD, LP, digital download	5	1	1	34	13	23	40	40	US: 71,000+

=== Mixtapes ===
- The Odd Future Tape (2008)
- Radical (2010)

The Odd Future Tape was released on November 15, 2008. It was a free download on oddfuture.com. It features artists from the group like, Tyler, the Creator, Hodgy Beats, Left Brain, Casey Veggies, Jasper Dolphin and The Super 3 (The Jet Age of Tomorrow), which is Matt Martians, Pyramid Vritra and brandUn DeShay.

Radical was released on May 7, 2010. It was available as free download on oddfuture.com. "Swag Me Out" samples "Not a Stain on Me" by Big Tuck. "Blade" by Earl Sweatshirt is a remix of "Nothing’s Gonna Stop Me" by Terror Squad.

=== Compilations ===
- 12 Odd Future Songs (2011)

12 Odd Future Songs is an album compilation full of thirteen songs by all of the members except for Earl Sweatshirt since he was in Samoa boarding school at this time. Tyler, The Creator shared an iTunes link to this album on his Twitter page on October 4, 2011.

Some of these songs on this album were recorded between 2007 and 2010. For example, "Bastard" and "VCR" are on Tyler, The Creator's album "Bastard" released on December 25, 2009. "Rolling Papers" featuring Tyler, The Creator and "SteamRoller" featuring Hodgy & Frank Ocean are the two songs that are on Domo Genesis's mixtape "Rolling Papers" that was released on August 30, 2010.

== Awards and nominations ==
Year	Organization	Award	Result
2011	O Music Awards	Best Web-Born Artist	Nominated
2011	MTV2 Sucker Free Awards	Best Crew of 2011	Nominated
2013	NME Awards	Best International Band	Nominated
