= Hodgy =

American rapper and record producer (born 1990)

Jerry
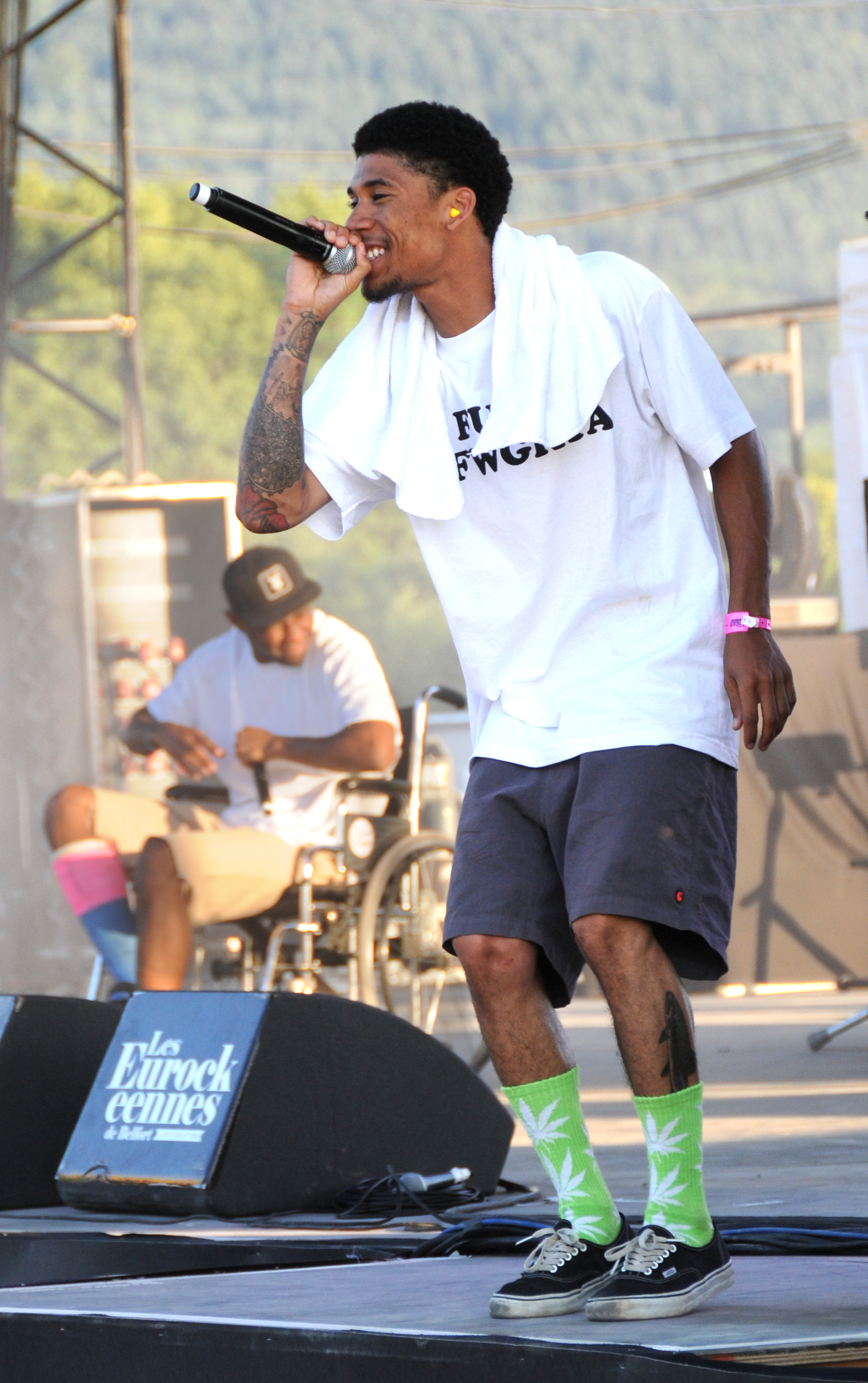
- Jerry (then Hodgy Beats) performing in July 2011

Background information
- Also known as: Hodgy Beats (2007–2016); Hodgy (2016–2023); Hype
- Born: Gerard Damien Long; November 9, 1990 (age 35); Trenton, New Jersey, U.S.
- Origin: Pasadena, California, U.S.
- Genre: Alternative hip hop
- Occupations: Rapper; singer; songwriter; record producer; music video director
- Instruments: Vocals; keyboard; FL Studio
- Years active: 2007–present
- Labels: Columbia; Odd Future (former)
- Formerly of: HA; MellowHype; Odd Future; MellowHigh
- Website: poortrait.com

Gerard Damien Long (born November 9, 1990), known mononymously as Jerry (stylized as jerry.; formerly Hodgy and Hodgy Beats), is an American rapper, singer and record producer. He is best known for being a founding member of the hip hop collective Odd Future.

== Music career ==
Long was an original member of Odd Future along with Tyler, the Creator, Left Brain, Matt Martians (as The Super 3), and Casey Veggies. Hodgy was the first member of Odd Future to release a solo record, with The Dena Tape in 2009. As a member of the duo MellowHype with Left Brain, he has released four albums; YelloWhite, BlackenedWhite, Numbers, and INSA.

Long has been featured on various projects including Bastard, Goblin and Wolf by Tyler, The Creator, Earl by Earl Sweatshirt, Rolling Papers by Domo Genesis, 119 by Trash Talk, and The Odd Future Tape, Radical and The OF Tape Vol. 2 with Odd Future. He appeared on "Outta Control", a song from Stones Throw rapper M.E.D.'s album Classic, produced by fellow Los Angeles native Madlib. Hodgy also appeared in the music video for that song which was released after the song was released.

Long released six solo mixtapes under the "Hodgy" or "Hodgy Beats" alias: The Dena Tape, Untitled EP, Untitled 2 EP, Dena Tape 2, They Watchin' LoFi Series 1, and Dukkha. On October 31, 2013, MellowHigh (Left Brain, Hodgy Beats, Domo Genesis) released their debut album MellowHigh on Odd Future Records. The album debuted at number 89 on the US Billboard 200. In 2015, Hodgy revealed that he was almost done with his solo debut album. He also starred as a feature artist on Alison Wonderland's remix of The Buzz, by Hermitude.

His debut studio album, Fireplace: TheNotTheOtherSide, was released in December 2016 via Odd Future and Columbia Records. The album featured artists such as Busta Rhymes, Lil Wayne, and Unknown Mortal Orchestra.

On March 24, 2022, after six years of inactivity, Long released a single titled "Into Someone" and announced an upcoming project, Entitled, which was released on May 20, 2022.

In 2023, Long rescinded his previously known, Odd Future associated alias of "Hodgy", rebranding himself as "Jerry", and released a music video for a track entitled "Facing the Worst Fears". The song had been part of an extended play, featuring material that would later appear on his first full length studio album in nearly 8 years, Lovemesooner. The album released On February 14, 2024 alongside a music video for the song "Kept my heart for myself".

== Personal life ==
Gerard Long was born and raised in Trenton, New Jersey. He is of Jamaican, Fijian and Filipino descent. At the age of nine, he moved to Southern California with his sister after his mother remarried. He attended Pasadena High School in Pasadena, California.

On August 1, 2011, his long-time ex-girlfriend Cortney Brown, gave birth to their son, named Trenton Gerald Long. Vyron Turner (Left Brain) is Trenton's godfather. He fathered two children with the Canadian singer Nelly Furtado.

Following the release of Entitled, Long revealed in an interview that he had committed to a rehab program in early 2020, before moving to Toronto after his release. He currently lives there with his daughter and two sons.

== Discography ==
=== Studio albums ===
- Fireplace: TheNotTheOtherSide (2016)
- Lovemesooner (2024) (as Jerry)
