= Coachella 2024 =

Music festival in California, U.S.

- Lineup poster
- Dates: Weekend 1: April 12, 2024–April 14, 2024; Weekend 2: April 19, 2024–April 21, 2024
- Locations: Empire Polo Club, Indio, California, United States
- Previous event: Coachella 2023
- Next event: Coachella 2025
- Organizer: Goldenvoice
- Website: coachella.com

Coachella 2024 was a music and arts festival that took place at the Empire Polo Club in Indio, California on April 12–14 and 19–21, 2024. The headliners for the festival were Lana Del Rey, Tyler, the Creator, Doja Cat and No Doubt.

== Background ==
The Coachella Valley Music and Arts Festival, sometimes referred to as "Coachella Festival" or simply "Coachella," is held annually at the Empire Polo Club in Indio, California. Founded by Paul Tollett and Rick Van Santen in 1999, the event features musical artists from many genres of music, including rock, pop, indie, hip hop and electronic dance music, as well as art installations and sculptures.

The full lineup was announced on January 16, 2024. The 2024 event is the third year back after it was cancelled in 2020 and 2021 due to the COVID-19 pandemic. Ticket sales of the event were reported to be the slowest in a decade. Past years had sold out on the same day with week one of the 2024 festival taking 27 days to sell out. The event takes place on two weekends, April 12–14 and April 19–21.

== Lineup ==
The festival lineup was announced in January 2024 and included singer-songwriter Lana Del Rey headlining both Fridays of the event, Tyler, the Creator on both Saturdays, and Doja Cat for both Sundays. The lineup was reduced to 147 acts for 2024 as opposed to the 166 acts for Coachella 2023. No Doubt also performed as a reunion, the first time they played together since 2015.

=== Coachella Stage ===
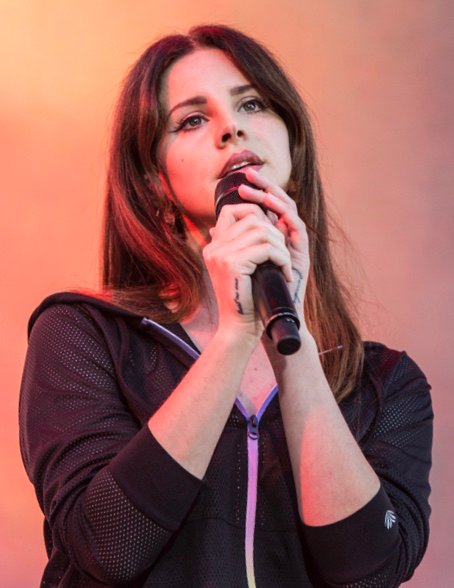
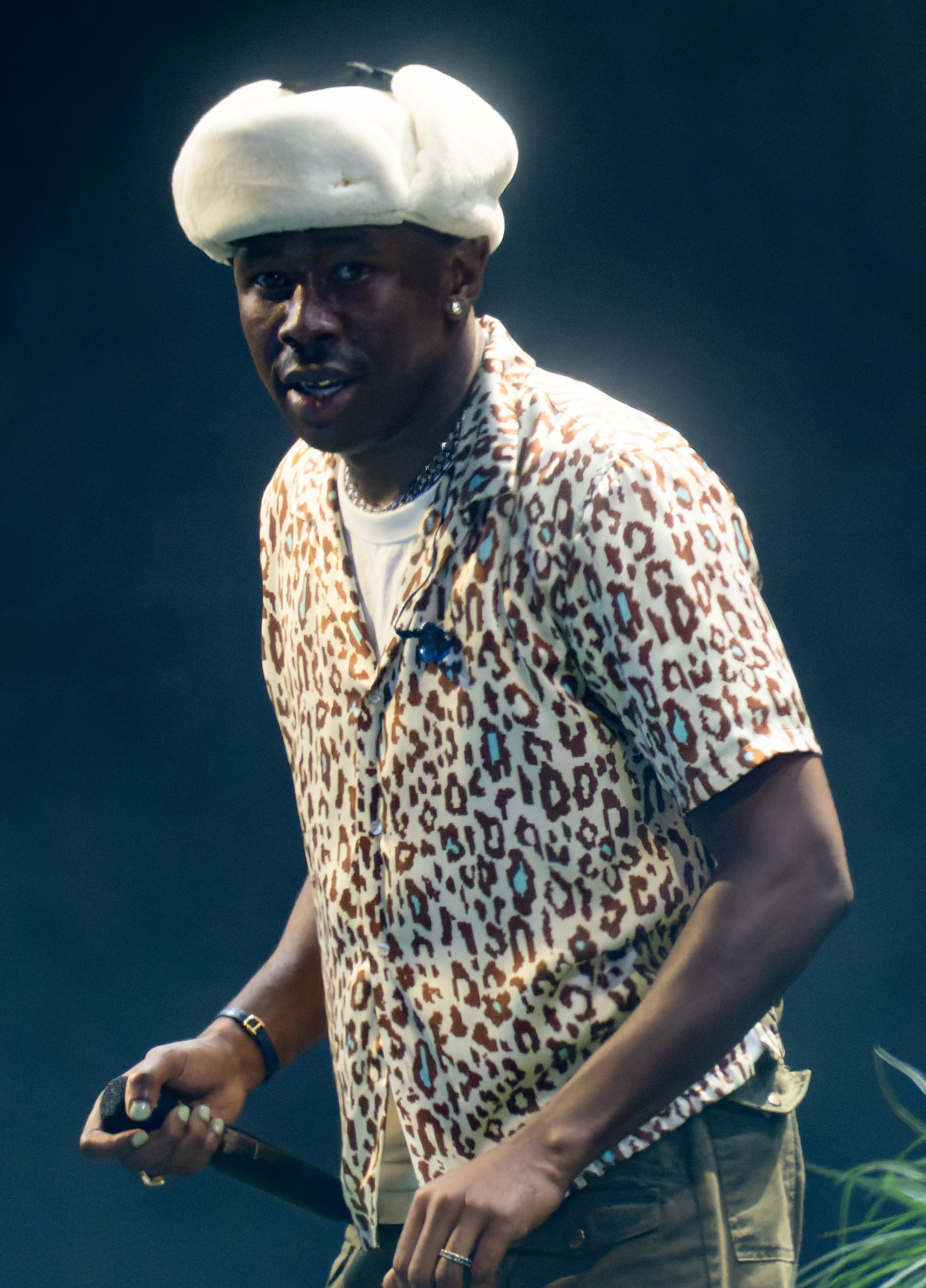
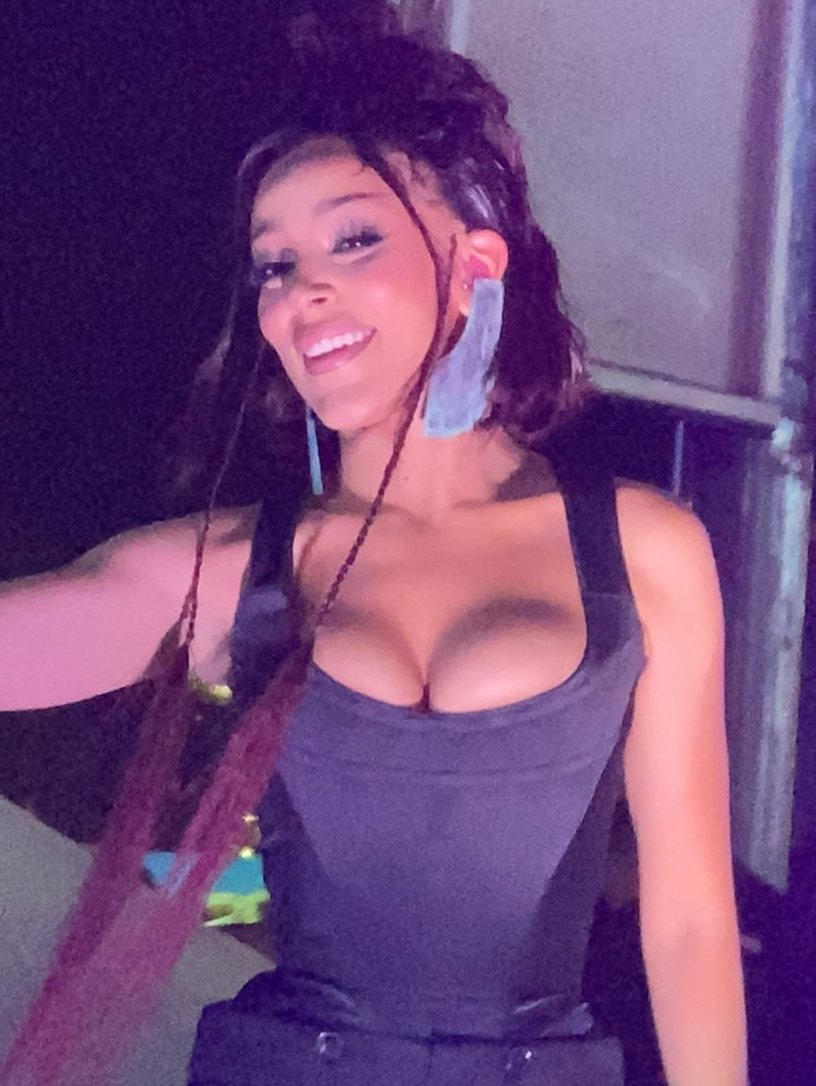
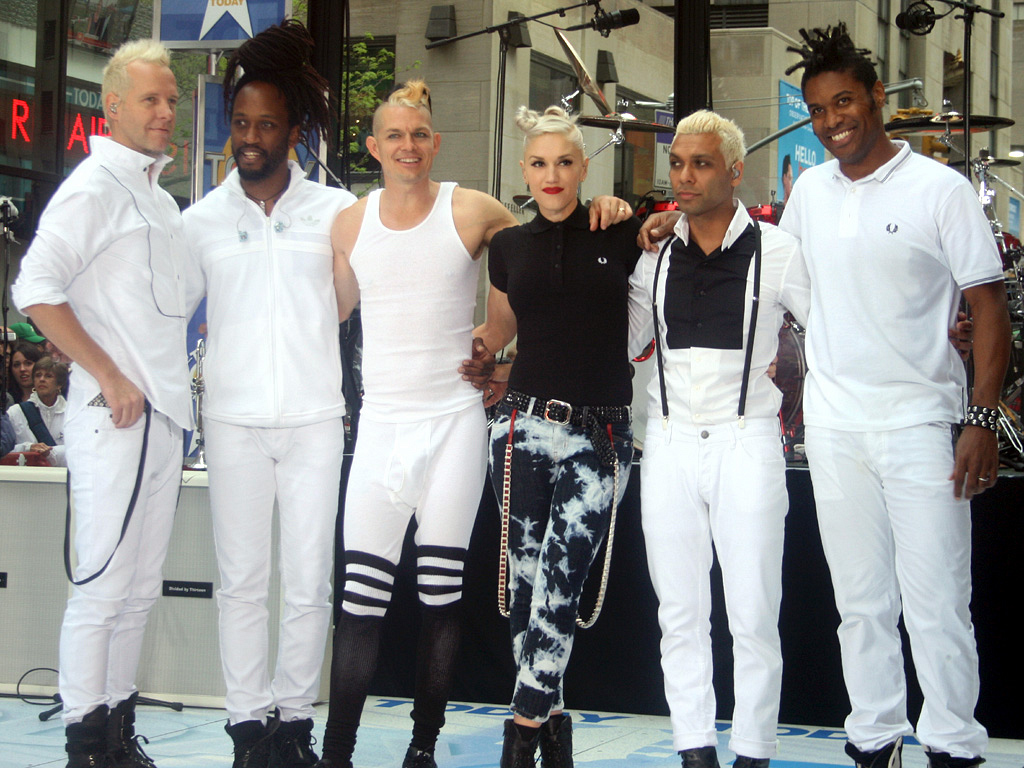
Coachella 2024 headliners Lana Del Rey, Tyler, the Creator, Doja Cat and No Doubt.

Friday	Saturday	Sunday
Lana Del Rey^{[A]}; Peso Pluma^{[B]}; Lil Uzi Vert; Sabrina Carpenter^{[C]}; Young Miko; Record Safari	Tyler, the Creator^{[D]}; No Doubt^{[E]}; Blur^{[F]}; Sublime; Santa Fe Klan; Jack Glam	Doja Cat^{[G]}; J Balvin^{[H]}; Bebe Rexha^{[I]}; Carín León^{[J]}; YG Marley^{[K]}; Ludmilla^{[L]}; Talón

A. Lana Del Rey's set featured guest appearances from Jon Batiste, Billie Eilish, Jack Antonoff, and Camila Cabello
B. Peso Pluma's set featured guest appearances from Anitta, Becky G, Junior H, Arcángel, and Santa Fe Klan
C. Sabrina Carpenter's set featured a guest appearance from Norah Jones
D. Tyler, the Creator's set featured guest appearances from Childish Gambino, ASAP Rocky, Charlie Wilson, and Kali Uchis
E. No Doubt's set featured a guest appearance from Olivia Rodrigo
F. Blur's set featured the Torres Martinez Cahuilla Bird Singers
G. Doja Cat's set featured guest appearances from 21 Savage, Teezo Touchdown, and ASAP Rocky
H. J Balvin's set featured guest appearances from Jowell & Randy, De la Ghetto, and Will Smith
I. Bebe Rexha's set featured a guest appearance from David Guetta
J. Carín León's set featured a guest appearance from Mau y Ricky
K. YG Marley's set featured guest appearances from Lauryn Hill, Wyclef Jean, and Busta Rhymes
L. Ludmilla's set featured a guest appearance from Ryan Castro

==== Headline sets ====
Lana Del Rey
1. "Without You"
2. "West Coast"
3. "Doin' Time"
4. "Summertime Sadness"
5. "Cherry"
6. "Pretty When You Cry"
7. "Ride"
8. "Born to Die"
9. "Bartender"
10. "Chemtrails over the Country Club"
11. "The Grants"
12. "Did You Know That There's a Tunnel Under Ocean Blvd"
13. "Norman Fucking Rockwell"
14. "Arcadia"
15. "Candy Necklace" with Jon Batiste
16. "Ocean Eyes" with Billie Eilish
17. "Video Games" with Billie Eilish
18. "Hope Is a Dangerous Thing for a Woman Like Me to Have – but I Have It" with Jack Antonoff
19. "A&W"
20. "Young and Beautiful"
During Del Rey's set on the second weekend, Camila Cabello joined Del Rey on stage to perform "I Luv It", succeeding "Born to Die". "Ocean Eyes" and "Video Games" were not performed.
Tyler, the Creator
1. "Igor's Theme"
2. "Lemonhead"
3. "WusYaName"
4. "Lumberjack"
5. "I Think"
6. "Best Interest"
7. "Dogtooth"
8. "Running Out of Time" with Childish Gambino
9. "Sorry Not Sorry"
10. "Potato Salad" with ASAP Rocky
11. "Who Dat Boy" with ASAP Rocky
12. "She"
13. "Tron Cat"
14. "Yonkers"
15. "Tamale"
16. "Odd Toddlers"
17. "Smuckers"
18. "IFHY"
19. "Earfquake" with Charlie Wilson
20. "See You Again" with Kali Uchis
21. "New Magic Wand"

During Tyler's set on the second weekend:

- "Corso" and an a capella of "What a Day" were performed in place of "Potato Salad".
- Earl Sweatshirt joined Tyler on stage to perform "AssMilk" and "Rusty" in place of "Odd Toddlers" and "Smuckers".
- "Running Out of Time" and "Tron Cat" were not performed.
Doja Cat
1. "Acknowledge Me"
2. "Shutcho"
3. "Demons"
4. "Tia Tamera"
5. "Fuck the Girls (FTG)"
6. "Gun"
7. "Okloser"
8. "Ouchies"
9. "N.H.I.E." with 21 Savage
10. "Attention"
11. "97"
12. "Balut"
13. "Need to Know"
14. "Masc" with Teezo Touchdown
15. "Streets"
16. "Agora Hills"
17. "Ain't Shit"
18. "WYM Freestyle"
19. "Urrrge!" with ASAP Rocky
20. "Paint the Town Red"
21. "Wet Vagina"
During Doja Cat's set on the second weekend, "Go Off" was performed in place of "N.H.I.E", "Disrespectful" was performed preceding "Streets", and "Urrrge!" was not performed.
No Doubt
1. "Hella Good"
2. "Sunday Morning"
3. "Ex-Girlfriend"
4. "It’s My Life"
5. "Different People"
6. "Hey Baby"
7. "Total Hate '95"
8. "Bathwater" with Olivia Rodrigo
9. "One Step Beyond"
10. "Simple Kind of Life"
11. "Underneath It All"
12. "Happy Now?"
13. "New"
14. "Just a Girl"
15. "Don't Speak"
16. "Spiderwebs"
During No Doubt's set on the second weekend, "Excuse Me Mr.", "Guns of Navarone" and "End It on This" were performed in place of "Total Hate '95", "One Step Beyond" and "Happy Now?", respectively. "Bathwater" was performed without guest.

=== Outdoor Theatre ===
Friday	Saturday	Sunday
Justice; Everything Always; Deftones; L'Impératrice; Fundido	Gesaffelstein; Jungle^{[A]}; Jon Batiste^{[B]}; Blxst^{[C]}; Vampire Weekend; Gabe Real	Jhené Aiko^{[D]}; Khruangbin; The Rose; Reneé Rapp^{[E]}; Tiffany Tyson

A. Jungle's set featured guest appearances from Erick the Architect and Channel Tres
B. Jon Batiste's set featured guest appearances from Juvenile and Willow Smith
C. Blxst's set featured a guest appearance from Feid
D. Jhené Aiko's set featured guest appearances from Tyga, Saweetie, Omarion, and Big Sean
E. Reneé Rapp's set featured a guest appearances from Kesha and Coco Jones

=== Sonora Tent ===
Friday	Saturday	Sunday
Son Rompe Pera; Clown Core; Black Country, New Road; Eartheater; The Beths; Late Night Drive Home; Narrow Head; Upchurch; Doom Dave	Brutalismus 3000; Bar Italia; The Red Pears; Depresión Sonora; The Adicts; The Aquabats; Girl Ultra; Militarie Gun; Triste Juventud x TÓTEM	Boy Harsher; Mandy, Indiana; Latin Mafia; Eddie Zuko; Hermanos Gutiérrez; Feeble Little Horse; BB Trickz; Jjuujjuu; Argenis

=== Gobi Tent ===
Friday	Saturday	Sunday
Suki Waterhouse; Chlöe Bailey; Neil Frances; Brittany Howard; Chappell Roan; Sid Sriram; Kokoroko; Cimafunk	Orbital; Kevin Kaarl; Saint Levant; Oneohtrix Point Never; Palace; The Last Dinner Party; Thuy; Young Fathers; Erika de Casier; *Elusive	Atarashii Gakko!; Barry Can't Swim; Two Shell; Olivia Dean; Jockstrap; Mdou Moctar; WaveGroove

=== Mojave Tent ===
Friday	Saturday	Sunday
Anti Up; Hatsune Miku; Yoasobi; Tinashe; Faye Webster; The Japanese House; Mall Grab; DAYSonMARKET	The Drums; Coi Leray; Charlotte de Witte; Bleachers; Kevin Abstract^{[A]}; Raye; Kenya Grace; Anika Kai	Bicep; Lil Yachty^{[B]}; Tems^{[C]}; Victoria Monét; 88RISING FUTURES; Taking Back Sunday; Flo; Honeyroot

A. Kevin Abstract's set featured guest appearances from Sky Ferreira, Dominic Fike, and Quadeca
B. Lil Yachty's set featured guest appearances from Justine Skye, Karrahbooo, and Mac DeMarco
C. Tems' set featured guest appearances from Justin Bieber and Wizkid

=== Sahara Tent ===
Friday	Saturday	Sunday
Steve Angello; Ateez; Peggy Gou; Bizarrap^{[A]}; Skepta; Ken Carson; Cloonee; Skin on Skin; Sincerely, Manolo	Dom Dolla; Le Sserafim; ISOKNOCK^{[B]}; Ice Spice; Grimes; Purple Disco Machine; Destroy Lonely; Starrza; Loboman	John Summit; DJ Snake; Anyma; NAV; AP Dhillon; Spinall; Tita Lau; Bones

A. Bizarrap's set featured a guest appearance from Shakira
B. Collaborative project between ISOxo & Knock2

=== Yuma Tent ===
Friday	Saturday	Sunday
Gorgon City; Adriatique; ANOTR; Kevin de Vries x Kölsch; Blond:ish; Innellea; Miss Monique; Ben Sterling; Keyspan	The Blessed Madonna; Patrick Mason; Reinier Zonneveld; Âme x Marcel Dettmann; Will Clarke; Rebüke; Mahmut Orhan; Maz; Kimonos	Artbat; Folamour; Carlita; Adam Ten x Mita Gami; Eli & Fur; Flight Facilities; DJ Seinfeld; JOPLYN

=== Quasar Stage ===
Friday	Saturday	Sunday
Honey Dijon; Green Velvet; Patrick Mason; Rufus du sol	Michael Bibi; Carlita; Anyma b2b Eric Prydz	Jamie xx; Floating Points; Daphni; Mall Grab; Diplo b2b Mau P
