= List of awards and nominations received by Tyler, the Creator =

Tyler, the Creator awards and nominations
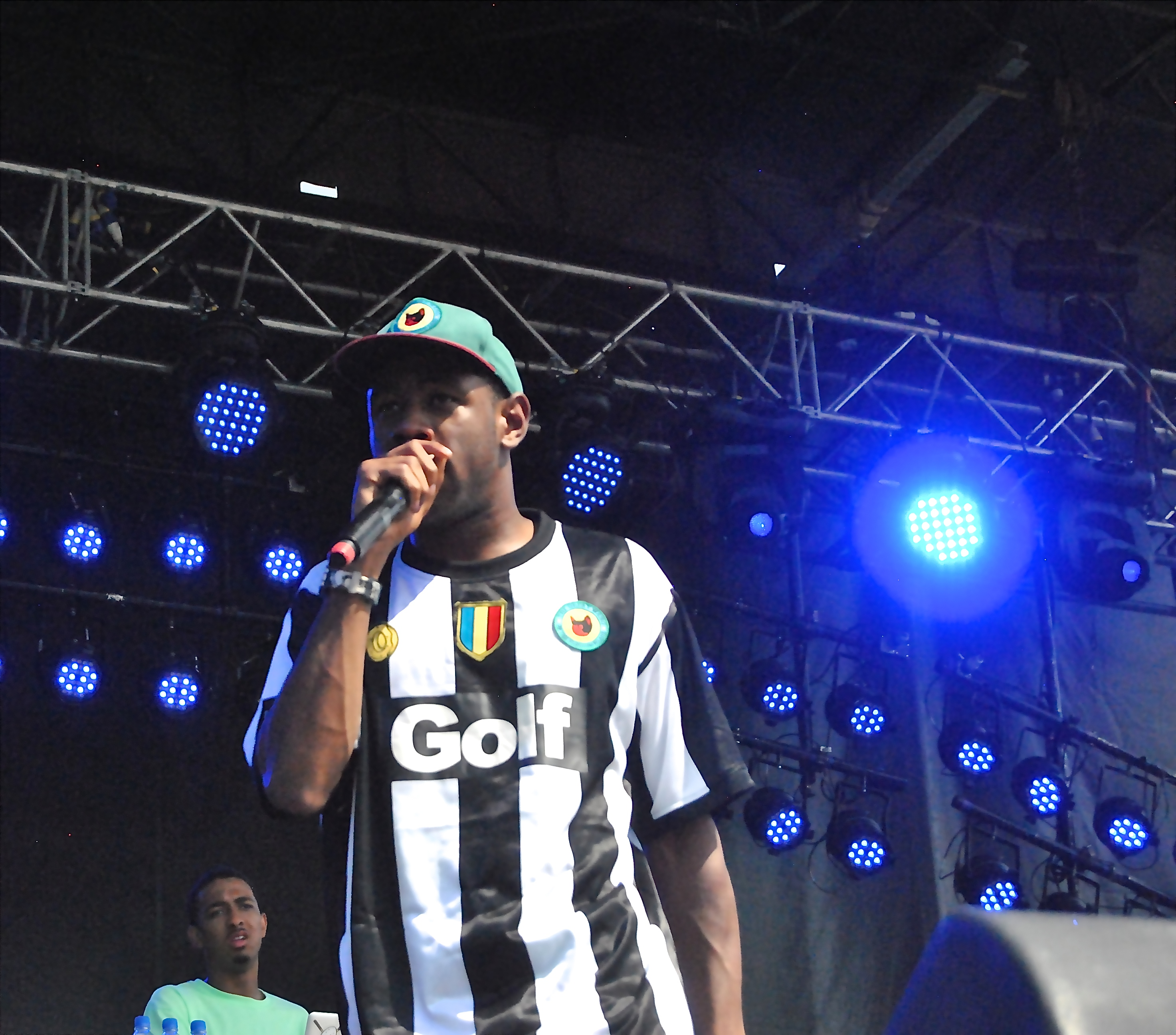
- Tyler, the Creator performing at the 2016 Governors Ball
Awards and nominations
Award	Wins	Nominations
Annie Awards	0	1
BET Hip Hop Awards	3	8
Brit Awards	1	1
Grammy Awards	3	11
MTV Video Music Awards	1	5
NME Awards	0	1
UK Music Video Awards	4	7

Totals (Note: Certain award groups do not simply award one winner. They acknowledge several different recipients, have runners-up, and have third place. Since this is a specific recognition and is different from losing an award, runner-up mentions are considered wins in this award tally. For simplification and to avoid errors, each award in this list has been presumed to have had a prior nomination.)
- Wins: 17
- Nominations: 77

Tyler, the Creator is an American rapper and producer who has received various awards and nominations including a Brit Award, three Grammy Awards and an MTV Video Music Award. He released his second studio album Goblin in 2011. At the 2011 MTV Video Music Awards he was nominated for Video of the Year for the single "Yonkers" from the album, he also won Best New Artist for the song. He received his first Grammy Award nomination in 2013 for Album of the Year as a featured artist in Frank Ocean's debut album Channel Orange. In 2013, he released his third album, Wolf, and in 2015, he released his fourth, Cherry Bomb. His fifth album, Flower Boy, was released in 2017 and was nominated for Best Rap Album at the 60th Annual Grammy Awards.

In 2019, he released his sixth album IGOR, the album was met with critical acclaim and won the Grammy Award for Best Rap Album and was nominated for the BET Hip Hop Award for Album of the Year. The following year, he won International Male Solo Artist at the 40th Brit Awards. His seventh album, Call Me If You Get Lost, was released in 2021 and received two nominations at the 64th Annual Grammy Awards, for Best Rap Album, his third nomination in the category, and for Best Melodic Rap Performance for the songs "WusYaName".

== Awards and nominations ==
Award	Year	Category	Nominated work	Result	Ref.
Actor Awards	2026	Outstanding Performance by a Cast in a Motion Picture	Marty Supreme	Nominated	
American Music Awards	2025	Favorite Rap/Hip Hop Artist	Himself	Nominated	
American Music Awards	2025	Favorite Rap/Hip Hop Album	Chromakopia	Nominated	
American Music Awards	2026	Best Male Hip-Hop Artist	Himself	Nominated	
Annie Awards	2018	Best Music in a Feature Production	The Grinch	Nominated	
Apple Music Awards	2025	Artist of the Year	Himself	Won	
BET Awards	2022	Album of the Year	Call Me If You Get Lost	Nominated	
BET Awards	2024	Video Director of the Year	Himself	Nominated	
BET Awards	2025	Best Collaboration	"Sticky" (with GloRilla, Sexyy Red & Lil Wayne)	Nominated	
BET Awards	2025	Best Male Hip Hop Artist	Himself	Nominated	
BET Awards	2025	Video Director of the Year	Himself	Nominated	
BET Awards	2026	Album of the Year	Don't Tap the Glass	Nominated	
BET Hip Hop Awards	2011	Rookie of the Year	Himself	Nominated	
BET Hip Hop Awards	2017	Impact Track	"Who Dat Boy" (featuring A$AP Rocky)	Nominated	
BET Hip Hop Awards	2019	Album of the Year	IGOR	Nominated	
BET Hip Hop Awards	2021	Album of the Year	Call Me If You Get Lost	Won	
BET Hip Hop Awards	2021	Hip Hop Artist of the Year	Himself	Nominated	
BET Hip Hop Awards	2021	Best Live Performer	Himself	Won	
BET Hip Hop Awards	2021	Producer of the Year	Himself	Nominated	
BET Hip Hop Awards	2021	Cultural Influence Award	Himself	Won	
BET Hip Hop Awards	2022	Best Live Performer	Himself	Nominated	
Brit Awards	2020	International Male Solo Artist	Himself	Won	
Brit Awards	2025	International Artist of the Year	Himself	Nominated	
Brit Awards	2026	International Artist of the Year	Himself	Nominated	
Grammy Awards	2013	Album of the Year	Channel Orange (as featured artist)	Nominated	
Grammy Awards	2018	Best Rap Album	Flower Boy	Nominated	
Grammy Awards	2020	Best Rap Album	Igor	Won	
Grammy Awards	2022	Best Rap Album	Call Me If You Get Lost	Won	
Grammy Awards	2022	Best Melodic Rap Performance	"WusYaName" (with YoungBoy Never Broke Again and Ty Dolla $ign)	Nominated	
Grammy Awards	2026	Album of the Year	Chromakopia	Nominated	
Grammy Awards	2026	Best Rap Album	Chromakopia	Nominated	
Grammy Awards	2026	Best Album Cover	Chromakopia	Won	
Grammy Awards	2026	Best Alternative Music Album	Don't Tap the Glass	Nominated	
Grammy Awards	2026	Best Rap Performance	"Darling, I" (featuring Teezo Touchdown)	Nominated	
Grammy Awards	2026	Best Rap Song	"Sticky" (featuring GloRilla, Sexyy Red, and Lil Wayne)	Nominated	
MTV Video Music Awards	2011	Best New Artist	"Yonkers"	Won	
MTV Video Music Awards	2011	Video of the Year	"Yonkers"	Nominated	
MTV Video Music Awards	2014	Best Art Direction	"Tamale"	Nominated	
MTV Video Music Awards	2015	Best Visual Effects	"Fucking Young/Death Camp"	Nominated	
MTV Video Music Awards	2021	Best Direction	"LUMBERJACK"	Nominated	
MTV Sucker Free Awards	2011	Rookie of the Year	Himself	Won	
MTV Sucker Free Awards	2011	Must Follow Artist	Himself	Won	
MTV Woodie Awards	2014	Performing Woodie	Himself	Nominated	
NME Awards	2020	Best Album in the World	IGOR	Nominated	
NME Awards	2022	Best Album in the World	Call Me If You Get Lost	Nominated	
NME Awards	2022	Best Festival Headliner	Himself	Nominated	
O Music Awards	2011	Most Outrageous Tweet	Himself	Nominated	
UK Music Video Awards	2018	Best Urban Video - International	"After the Storm" (with Kali Uchis and Bootsy Collins)	Nominated	
UK Music Video Awards	2018	Best Production Design in a Video	"After the Storm" (with Kali Uchis and Bootsy Collins)	Nominated	
UK Music Video Awards	2021	Best Hip Hop/Grime/Rap Video – International	"Corso"	Nominated	
UK Music Video Awards	2022	Best Hip Hop/Grime/Rap Video – International	"Cash In Cash Out" (with Pharrell and 21 Savage)	Won	
UK Music Video Awards	2022	Best Visual Effects in a Video	"Cash In Cash Out" (with Pharrell and 21 Savage)	Won	
UK Music Video Awards	2022	Best Animation in a Video	"Cash In Cash Out" (with Pharrell and 21 Savage)	Won	
UK Music Video Awards	2022	Video of the Year	"Cash In Cash Out" (with Pharrell and 21 Savage)	Won	
XXL Awards	2022	Artist of the Year	Himself	Nominated	
XXL Awards	2022	Male Rapper of the Year	Himself	Nominated	
XXL Awards	2022	Lyricist of the Year	Himself	Nominated	
XXL Awards	2022	Producer of the Year	Himself	Nominated	
XXL Awards	2022	Performer of the Year	Himself	Nominated	
XXL Awards	2022	The People's Champ	Himself	Nominated	
XXL Awards	2022	Album of the Year	Call Me If You Get Lost	Nominated	
XXL Awards	2022	Song of the Year	"WusYaName" (with YoungBoy Never Broke Again and Ty Dolla $ign)	Nominated	
XXL Awards	2022	Video of the Year	"LUMBERJACK"	Nominated	
XXL Awards	2023	Performer of the Year	Himself	Nominated	
XXL Awards	2023	Video of the Year	"Cash In Cash Out" (with Pharrell and 21 Savage)	Nominated	
XXL Awards	2024	Video of the Year	“Sorry Not Sorry”	Nominated	
XXL Awards	2025	Artist of the Year	Himself	Nominated	
XXL Awards	2025	Male Rapper of the Year	Himself	Nominated	
XXL Awards	2025	Lyricist of the Year	Himself	Nominated	
XXL Awards	2025	Producer of the Year	Himself	Nominated	
XXL Awards	2025	Performer of the Year	Himself	Nominated	
XXL Awards	2025	The People's Champ	Himself	Nominated	
XXL Awards	2025	Album of the Year	Chromakopia	Nominated	
XXL Awards	2025	Video of the Year	“Noid”	Nominated	
XXL Awards	2026	Artist of the Year	Himself	Nominated	
XXL Awards	2026	Male Rapper of the Year	Himself	Nominated	
XXL Awards	2026	Performer of the Year	Himself	Won	
XXL Awards	2026	The People's Champ	Himself	Nominated	
XXL Awards	2026	Album of the Year	Don't Tap the Glass	Nominated	
XXL Awards	2026	Video of the Year	“Darling, I”	Nominated	
Wall Street Journal Innovator Awards	2019	Music Innovator of the Year	Himself	Won	
