= Answer (Tyler, the Creator song) =

Song by Tyler, the Creator

from the album Wolf
- Released: April 2, 2013
- Genre: Hip hop
- Length: 3:50, Music Video Version 1:48
- Label: Odd Future
- Songwriter: Tyler Okonma
- Producers: Tyler, The Creator

"Answer" is a hip-hop song by the American rapper and producer Tyler, the Creator, released as the sixth track from his third studio album Wolf (2013). The song was solely written and produced by Tyler, the Creator, and was released with the rest of its parent album on April 2, 2013. A music video accompanying a heavily shortened version of the song was released on October 8, 2013, which also featured the song "Tamale" from the same album.

== Composition ==
The song features 'shimmering' organs, 'simple' electric guitar scales and a 'comforting, moody' bass. The lyrics involve Tyler rapping about his absent father. In the verses, he expresses his anger towards him, going as far as to call him a faggot and comparing him to a sperm donor. The chorus, however, puts a contrast onto these lyrics, where Tyler states that if he was to call his father, he would hope that he would answer. The third and final verse features Tyler rapping about new developments in his group at the time, Odd Future, as well as the passing of his grandmother.

== Critical reception ==
Kathy Iandoli from Billboard Magazine praised the song for its 'vulnerability' and described it as 'bipolar'. Nia Coats of Okayplayer ranked it amongst Tyler The Creator's best 26 songs, while Michael Herbers of medium Medium claimed it is an 'essential' Tyler, The Creator song.

== Music video ==
The music video for Answer features a heavily edited version of the song, cutting its length to below 2 minutes. It plays at the end of the music video for Tamale, and features Tyler, The Creator on a couch, lipsyncing to the song, while Pharrell Williams and Lucas Vercetti mime the song on drums and guitar.

== Certifications ==
Certifications for "Tamale"
Region	Certification	Certified units/sales
United States (RIAA)	Gold	500,000^{‡}
^{‡} Sales+streaming figures based on certification alone.
