= Best Interest =

Best Interest or Best Interests may refer to:

- Best interests, a child rights principle
- Best Interest, a 2019 Taiwanese television series starring Tien Hsin and James Wen
- "Best Interest" (song), by Tyler, the Creator, 2019
- Best Interests, a 2023 British television drama series

== See also ==
- In the Best Interest of the Child, a 1990 American telemovie about child sexual abuse starring Meg Tilly
- In the Best Interest of the Children, a 1992 American fact-based telemovie starring Sarah Jessica Parker
- "Best interest decisions", made on behalf of people who do not have mental capacity in England and Wales
