= Domo23 =

2013 single by Tyler, the Creator

Single by Tyler, the Creator

from the album Wolf
- Released: February 14, 2013
- Recorded: 2012
- Genre: Hip hop
- Length: 2:38
- Label: Odd Future; RED; Sony
- Songwriter: Tyler Okonma
- Producer: Tyler, the Creator

Tyler, the Creator singles chronology
"Trouble on My Mind" (2011)	"Domo23" (2013)	"Whoa" (2013)

"Domo23" is a song written, produced, and performed by American rapper and producer Tyler, the Creator. It was released on February 14, 2013, as the lead single from his third studio album, Wolf (2013). The song peaked at number 2 on the Billboard Bubbling Under Hot 100 Singles and number 37 on the Billboard Hot R&B/Hip-Hop Songs chart.

== Background ==
On February 14, 2013, Odd Future uploaded a video to their YouTube account, which included L-Boy skydiving and stating that Wolf would be released on April 2, 2013, later that day Tyler stated on his Twitter account that he would be releasing a new song along with an accompanying music video.

Talking about the making of the song, Tyler the Creator said on his Instagram account in 2013:

A fan once told me to keep my head up, I replied that he should take his head down while slobbering on my D thang. I hate when they ask me for pictures, I'm like dude, just let me get my money then go back to your LGBTQ xyz's type of life. Whatever.

== Music video ==
The music video was released on February 14, 2013. In it, Tyler plays a wrestler named Fookie Bookie with blond dreads and metallic spandex, taking on his fellow Odd Future member Domo Genesis in the clip. Tyler ends up defeating Domo. The video then cuts to the song "Bimmer". The video featured cameos from Odd Future members Earl Sweatshirt, Jasper Dolphin, and Taco Bennett.

== Live performances ==
On February 26, 2013, Tyler, the Creator performed the song on Late Night with Jimmy Fallon along with "Treehome95".

== Track listing ==
Digital single
No.	Title	Writer(s)	Producer(s)	Length
1.	"Domo23"	Tyler Okonma	Tyler, the Creator	2:41

== Charts ==
Chart (2013)	Peak position
Canada Hot 100 (Billboard)	94
South Korea Downloads (Gaon)	150
South Korea Streaming Songs (Gaon)	185
US Bubbling Under Hot 100 (Billboard)	2
US Hot R&B/Hip-Hop Songs (Billboard)	37

== Release history ==
Country	Date	Format	Label
United States	February 14, 2013	Digital download	Odd Future, RED, Sony

== Certifications ==
Certifications for "Domo23"
Region	Certification	Certified units/sales
United States (RIAA)	Gold	500,000^{‡}
^{‡} Sales+streaming figures based on certification alone.
