= Potato Salad (song) =

Single by Tyler, the Creator and ASAP Rocky

from the album Wangsap
- Released: September 28, 2018
- Genre: Hip hop
- Length: 3:02
- Label: Columbia; RCA; Sony Music
- Songwriters: Tyler Okonma; Rakim Mayers; Monica Arnold; Lee Hatim; Melissa Elliott; Kanye West; Craig Brockman
- Producers: Elliott; West

Tyler, the Creator singles chronology
"Peach Fuzz" (2018)	"Potato Salad" (2018)	"Best Interest" (2019)

ASAP Rocky singles chronology
"Praise the Lord (Da Shine)" (2018)	"Potato Salad" (2018)	"Mario Cart" (2018)

Music video
- "Potato Salad" on YouTube

"Potato Salad" is a song by American rappers Tyler, the Creator and ASAP Rocky. It was first released on July 23, 2018, from AWGE's AWGE DVD Vol. 3, before being released to streaming services on September 28, 2018. The song is a freestyle of "Knock Knock" by Monica.

== Background ==
On Twitter, Tyler, the Creator revealed that he had been trying to rap over the beat of "Knock Knock" for ten years.

== Content ==
The lyrics revolve around topics including wealth and fashion. In the first verse, Tyler, the Creator makes puns based on a PlayStation controller, acknowledges the habit of many rappers to spend money on jewelry with a mention of designer Ben Baller, and boasts his income with lines about buying "COMME blouses" and packing houses with "some Leo Dicaps and some Cole Sprouses". ASAP Rocky performs the second verse, in which he references rapper Lil B and his group The Pack's song "Vans" and insists twice that his designer bag is "not a purse, it's a satchel." He later gives his stance on the state of hip hop and the new wave generation of artists that have been called mumble rappers, defending them and taking a dig at the older generation who look down upon them, with a reference to the criticism of the 2018 XXL Freshman Class. Rocky also shouts out to hip hop group Shabazz Palaces.

== Music video ==
The music video was shot by AWGE and filmed in Paris. The rappers meet up in the city, where they clown around and rap in front of the Eiffel Tower, as well as in the streets. They also show off their designer products, wearing fisherman sweaters and Chanel. As they perform, the lyrics of the song flash on screen. Rapper Jaden Smith also makes a cameo in the video, during ASAP Rocky's verse. The clip ends with a message hinting at a collaboration between Tyler, the Creator and ASAP Rocky: "WANG$AP Coming Soon".

== Certifications ==
Region	Certification	Certified units/sales
New Zealand (RMNZ)	Platinum	30,000^{‡}
United Kingdom (BPI)	Silver	200,000^{‡}
United States (RIAA)	Platinum	1,000,000^{‡}
^{‡} Sales+streaming figures based on certification alone.
