= Cash In Cash Out =

Single by Pharrell Williams featuring 21 Savage and Tyler, the Creator

from the album Phriends, Vol. 1 and American Dream (intended)
- Released: June 10, 2022
- Genre: Hip-hop
- Length: 3:36
- Label: Columbia
- Songwriters: Pharrell Williams; Shéyaa Abraham-Joseph; Tyler Okonma
- Producer: Pharrell Williams

Pharrell Williams singles chronology
"Neck & Wrist" (2022)	"Cash In Cash Out" (2022)	"No Más" (2022)

21 Savage singles chronology
"Wheelie" (2022)	"Cash In Cash Out" (2022)	"New Money" (2022)

Tyler, the Creator singles chronology
"WusYaName" (2021)	"Cash In Cash Out" (2022)	"Dogtooth" (2023)

Music video
- "Cash In Cash Out" on YouTube

"Cash In Cash Out" is a song produced by Pharrell Williams featuring performances by Atlanta-based rapper 21 Savage and American rapper Tyler, the Creator. Written by all three, it was released as a single through Columbia Records on June 10, 2022. Williams first teased the song on his TikTok account on June 6, 2022. An accompanying music video was released, in a zoetrope-inspired CG animation style.

== Background ==
Tyler recorded his verse on "Cash In Cash Out" after Williams played him the song with 21 Savage's vocals on it. Tyler asked Williams to send him the instrumental version of the song and then sent him a voice recording of his verse. Williams was working on 21 Savage's upcoming album American Dream, which the song was originally intended for, but Williams preferred to keep the song for himself. After a clip of Williams and 21 Savage working together on the song surfaced, Williams announced the song's title, cover art, and release date on May 31, 2022.

== Composition and lyrics ==
"Cash In Cash Out" contains a stripped-back beat by Williams that consists of "airtight snare drums, a blown-out 808, and vocal chirps". 21 Savage raps about receiving a million dollars to show up to places and references the 2001 stoner comedy film How High in a metaphor. Tyler uses different flows when he starts rapping on the song. The song is overall "dark and playful" and Williams continues his "streak of finding the beauty in opposites". In the first verse, 21 Savage raps about his gratitude to collaborate with Williams: "Pharrell made this so it's a million dollar beat". In the second verse, Tyler raps about a past performance that had non-money issues that he dealt with.

== Credits and personnel ==
- Pharrell Williams – production, songwriting
- 21 Savage – vocals, songwriting
- Tyler, the Creator – vocals, songwriting
- Manny Marroquin – mixing
- Emerson Mancini – mastering
- Mike Larson – recording
- Vic Wainstein – recording
- Collin Kadlec – engineering assistance
- Jonathan Lopez Garcia – engineering assistance

== Charts ==
Chart performance for "Cash In Cash Out"
Chart (2022)	Peak position
Australia (ARIA)	62
Canada Hot 100 (Billboard)	33
Global 200 (Billboard)	41
Netherlands (Single Tip)	30
New Zealand Hot Singles (RMNZ)	4
South Africa Streaming (TOSAC)	35
UK Singles (OCC)	73
UK Hip Hop/R&B (OCC)	38
US Billboard Hot 100	26
US Hot R&B/Hip-Hop Songs (Billboard)	5
US Rhythmic Airplay (Billboard)	25

== Certifications ==
Certifications for "Cash In Cash Out"
Region	Certification	Certified units/sales
United States (RIAA)	Platinum	1,000,000^{‡}
^{‡} Sales+streaming figures based on certification alone.

== Release history ==
Release history for "Cash In Cash Out"
Region	Date	Format	Label	Ref.
Various	June 10, 2022	Digital download; streaming	Columbia	
United States	June 21, 2022	Rhythmic contemporary radio	Columbia	
