= DJ Seinfeld =

Swedish DJ and record producer (born 1991)

- Born: Armand Darius Anders Jakobsson; 4 November 1991 (age 34); Malmö, Sweden
- Genres: House
- Occupations: DJ, producer
- Label: Young Ethics
- Website: https://www.djseinfeld.com/

Armand Darius Anders Jakobsson (born 4 November 1991), known professionally as DJ Seinfeld, is a Swedish electronic music DJ and record producer.

== Musical career ==
Jakobsson started making music in Edinburgh at the suggestion of a friend. He began experimenting with exploring the possibilities of music on his laptop. When he returned to Malmö after his studies, his interest in making music would intensify thanks to the encouragement of his old schoolmates. A move to Barcelona and the end of a relationship, resulted in extended sessions and lots of watching of the classic American sitcom Seinfeld, which Jakobsson fully adopted 2016 when he released his first recording.

== Musical style ==
In his music, DJ Seinfeld uses sounds from films or series, borrowings from acid house and deep house, as well as distortion effects. He has also used the stage names Birds of Sweden and Rimbaudian.

== Discography ==
=== Studio albums ===
- Time Spent Away from U (2017)
- Mirrors (2021)
- If This Is It (2026)

=== Compilation albums ===
- DJ-Kicks: DJ Seinfeld (2018)
- MIRRORS (REMIXED) (2023)

=== EPs ===
- Season 1 (2016)
- Sunrise (2017)
- Sakura (2018)
- Galazy (2019)
- Lilium (2019)
- Parallax (2019)
- Mezcalita (2020)
