= Dogtooth (song) =

2023 single by Tyler, the Creator

Single by Tyler, the Creator

from the album Call Me If You Get Lost: The Estate Sale
- Released: March 27, 2023
- Recorded: 2020–2021
- Genre: Hip hop; trap
- Length: 2:41
- Label: Columbia
- Songwriter: Tyler Okonma
- Producer: Tyler Okonma

Tyler, the Creator singles chronology
"Cash In Cash Out" (2022)	"Dogtooth" (2023)	"Sorry Not Sorry" (2023)

Music video
- "DOGTOOTH" on YouTube

"Dogtooth" is a song written, produced, and performed by American rapper and producer Tyler, the Creator, released on March 27, 2023, as the lead single (third overall) from The Estate Sale deluxe version of his album Call Me If You Get Lost. The song features DJ Drama with ad-libs.

== Background ==
On March 27, 2023, Tyler tweeted that his 2021 album Call Me If You Get Lost was his first album where he had many songs that did not make it onto the official release of the project. He said "some of those songs I really love, and knew they would never see the light of day, so Ive decided to put a few of them out [sic]." Dogtooth was released the same day, as the lead single for the deluxe version of Call Me If You Get Lost.

== Music video ==
The music video has been described by The Fader as having a "Wes Anderson-meets-Billionaire Boys Club" theme. In the video, Tyler showcases opulent and sophisticated style, as he is seen walking expensive dogs, employing a crane to demolish several Rolls-Royce vehicles, and performing driving stunts. While the video is filled with these displays of extravagance, the accompanying song features a "tender" and "heartfelt" tone, celebrating love and complemented by rich, soulful production. As with prior videos released for the album, it ends with the titular jingle; Tyler adds "The Estate Sale" in closing.

== Personnel ==
- Tyler Okonma – producer, composer, lyricist, associated performer, recording engineer (song's main author)
- Zachary Acosta – assistant engineer
- Mike Bozzi – mastering engineer
- NealHPogue – mixing engineer

== Charts ==
=== Weekly charts ===
Weekly chart performance for "Dogtooth"
Chart (2023)	Peak position
Australia (ARIA)	39
Canada Hot 100 (Billboard)	36
Global 200 (Billboard)	48
Ireland (IRMA)	38
Lithuania (AGATA)	30
Netherlands (Single Tip)	8
New Zealand (Recorded Music NZ)	35
Sweden Heatseeker (Sverigetopplistan)	16
UK Singles (OCC)	39
UK Hip Hop/R&B (OCC)	22
US Billboard Hot 100	33
US Hot R&B/Hip-Hop Songs (Billboard)	11
US R&B/Hip-Hop Airplay (Billboard)	21
US Rhythmic Airplay (Billboard)	12

=== Year-end charts ===
Year-end chart performance for "Dogtooth"
Chart (2023)	Position
US Hot R&B/Hip-Hop Songs (Billboard)	87
US Rhythmic (Billboard)	50

== Certifications ==
Certifications for "Dogtooth"
Region	Certification	Certified units/sales
United States (RIAA)	Gold	500,000^{‡}
^{‡} Sales+streaming figures based on certification alone.

== Release history ==
Release history and formats for "Dogtooth"
Region	Date	Format(s)	Label	Ref.
Various	March 27, 2023	Digital download; streaming	Columbia	
United States	April 11, 2023	Rhythmic radio	Columbia	
