= Wolf (Tyler, the Creator album) =

2013 studio album by Tyler, the Creator

Studio album by Tyler, the Creator
- Released: April 2, 2013
- Recorded: 2011–2013
- Studios: Klearlight (Dallas); Serenity West; The Treehouse (Hollywood); Studio for the Talented and Gifted (Los Angeles)
- Genre: Alternative hip-hop
- Length: 71:17
- Label: Odd Future
- Producers: Tyler, the Creator

Tyler, the Creator chronology
Goblin (2011)	Wolf (2013)	Cherry Bomb (2015)

Alternate covers
- Alternate cover

- Cover used for vinyl edition of the album and instrumentals, by Mark Ryden

Singles from Wolf
- 1. "Domo23" Released: February 14, 2013

Wolf is the third studio album by the American rapper Tyler, the Creator. It was released on April 2, 2013, by Odd Future Records. The album features guest appearances from Mike G, Domo Genesis, Earl Sweatshirt, Left Brain, Hodgy Beats, Erykah Badu and Pharrell, among others.

Wolf was supported by its lead single, "Domo23". The album received generally positive reviews from critics and debuted at number three on the US Billboard 200, selling 89,000 copies in its first week.

== Background ==
Tyler's two prior projects, Bastard and Goblin, contained lyrics and themes commonly used in the horrorcore subgenre, which Tyler claimed to not be part of. In November 2011, in an interview with Spin, Tyler expressed wanting to shift away from the themes of his previous work, stating:

Talking about rape and cutting bodies up, it just doesn't interest me anymore... what interests me is making weird hippie music for people to get high to. With Wolf, I'll brag a little more, talk about money and buying shit. But not like any other rapper, I'll be a smart-ass about it. People who wanted the first album again, I can't do that. I was 18, broke as fuck. On my third album, I have money and I'm hanging out with my idols. I can't rap about the same shit.

== Music and lyrics ==
Wolf is a concept album that features a continuous story of characters Wolf, Sam and Salem. Therapist character Dr. TC makes his last appearance on a Tyler album on the final track "Lone". The story presented in Wolf has been said to link to Tyler's two previous projects, with debates occurring on whether Wolf comes chronologically before or after Goblin.

The opening and title track, "WOLF", begins with piano chords and breathy vocals, and the character, Wolf appears at the end of the track. "Answer" features a simple guitar melody over heavy drums. On the song, Tyler proclaims his desire to get into contact with his estranged father and also mentions some problems that his friends are going through. "Slater" is a song devoted to Tyler's bike, which ends with Frank Ocean speaking the words "You're talking to a fucking bike. Loser". Kathy Iandoli of Billboard compared "Colossus" to Eminem's 2000 hit, "Stan", stating that Tyler "continuously switches the lyrics from being cutesy fanfare to sexually maniacal". Craig Jenkins of Pitchfork describes the track "IFHY" as "a bit of Neptunes worship so adroit that its plinking synths and jazzy chord changes give way to a falsettoed coda from Pharrell himself". Jenkins also compared the posse cut "Rusty" to the sound of Wu-Tang Clan, featuring "a lush reimagining of 1990s RZA production". "Trashwang" is a trap-influenced posse cut. Iandoli compared the sound of the song to the works of rapper Waka Flocka Flame. Treehome95 is the most jazz influenced song on the album, with features from Coco O and Erykah Badu. The album's final track, "Lone", features Tyler's last therapy session with Dr. TC. In the song, Tyler describes the events leading up to his grandmother's death.

== Release and promotion ==
On February 14, 2013, OFWGKTA posted a video to their YouTube account, which includes L-Boy skydiving and announcing that Wolf will be released on April 2, 2013. On the same day, Tyler revealed three different album covers via his Instagram account. The deluxe version of the album features a fold-out poster of the full album cover artwork that was designed by Mark Ryden, a limited embroidered patch, a Wolf calendar and a 24-page booklet featuring lyrics and artwork. Four days after the album's release, Tyler released the whole album for free streaming services through his SoundCloud account.

From March 11, 2013, to April 11, 2013, Tyler toured North America and Europe on the Wolf tour. The tour was his first solo tour without his group Odd Future. His first stop was Boulder, Colorado and the Wolf release party took place in Los Angeles, California on the release day of the album. He announced he would extend the tour from April 30 to May 18, 2013. These shows took place on the west coast of the United States and it features his Odd Future cohort, Earl Sweatshirt. On September 9, 2013, Tyler released a trailer for a film based on Wolf, however, nothing has come of it since.

=== Singles ===
The album's lead single, "Domo23", was released on February 14, 2013, as well an accompanying music video which features cameo appearances from Odd Future members Domo Genesis, Earl Sweatshirt, Jasper Dolphin and Taco. The song peaked at number two on the US Bubbling Under Hot 100 Singles and at number 37 on the US Hot R&B/Hip-Hop Songs. At the end of the video for "Domo23", it previewed the video for the reported second single, "Bimmer" featuring Odd Future member Frank Ocean.

=== Other songs ===
On March 29, 2013, the music video was released for "IFHY" featuring Pharrell. At the end of the video, the song cuts into a snippet of the music video for "Jamba" featuring Odd Future member Hodgy Beats. In the music video, Tyler "plays a lovestruck doll, acting out scenes in a dollhouse with a plastic girlfriend. While the real-life Tyler later drives through a neighborhood with Hodgy Beats as his song "Jamba" blasts from the speakers". "IFHY" peaked at number 24 on the US Heatseekers Songs. On October 7, 2013, a music video was released for both "Tamale" and "Answer".

=== Instrumentals ===
On April 7, 2023, Tyler, the Creator released the instrumentals of Wolf along with a reinstatement of merchandise from the album's release to commemorate its 10th anniversary.

== Critical reception ==
Professional ratings
Aggregate scores
Source	Rating
AnyDecentMusic?	6.9/10
Metacritic	70/100
Review scores
Source	Rating
AllMusic	3.5/5 stars
Exclaim!	8/10
Fact	4/5
The Independent	4/5 stars
Los Angeles Times	3/4 stars
NME	8/10
Pitchfork	7.8/10
Rolling Stone	3/5 stars
Slant Magazine	3/5 stars
XXL	3/5

Wolf was met with generally positive reviews. At Metacritic, which assigns a normalized rating out of 100 to reviews from professional publications, the album received an average score of 70, based on 31 reviews. Aggregator AnyDecentMusic? gave it 6.9 out of 10, based on their assessment of the critical consensus.

Craig Jenkins of Pitchfork said, "With Wolf, Tyler, the Creator displays a radical growth as a producer, composer and arranger, even if, as a rapper, he's still up to some of the same antics. Still, the album contains a few of the best songs he's ever written". Jeremy D. Larson of Consequence said, "Tyler is his own worst enemy, of course. But the buoyancy of the production and the overall intrigue of hearing him struggle with his idle hands prevent the album from getting mired down in too much vanity". David Jeffries of AllMusic said, "It's a fun album for fanatics, but the willingness to shock feels too comfortable at this point, so those who found it tiresome before will likely find it devastating here". Chris Dart of Exclaim! felt that "While Tyler will almost certainly never outgrow life as a weird, hell-raising provocateur, Wolf shows that he's already growing into life as a smart, diverse artist".

Slant Magazine's Jesse Cataldo commenting "The production is routinely strong, but things are weighed down by Tyler himself, who forcefully refuses to provide a palatable anchor to over an hour's worth of material". Cataldo saw the album as "progress on some fronts", but felt that Tyler "needs to move beyond certain issues" to "prove himself a vital force". Martín Caballero of The Boston Globe said, "Despite careering from one alter ego to the next and touching on everything from his absent father on "Answer" to the art of making campfire s'mores on the seven-minute "PartyIsntOver / Campfire / Bimmer", there's a broad vision and deft execution that holds things together much better than on Goblin". Eric Diep of XXL said, "Wolf meets its own high expectations by creating an absorbing journey of Tyler's imagination. Everything from being his own therapist to poking fun at newfound fame is documented in captivating fashion, however juvenile it may be at times. There's still growing up to do, and maybe time will tame the fascinating artist we see on this album. Until then, there's no escaping his meteoric rise. And the diehard Odd Future fans will love every minute of it".

David Amidon of PopMatters said, "If Wolf is not Goblin is the most important statement I feel like I could make about this album, the second most important thing I can probably say about it is that nothing has actually changed about Tyler himself. All his flaws as a coherent lyricist and person are on full display throughout the album, and the charm or lack thereof of that fact goes a long way towards how enjoyable this album can be". Jessica Hopper of Spin magazine felt that "Wolf's most grievous misstep, and its one true spiritual connection to the superior Bastard and Goblin: Tyler's defiant use of the word 'faggot'. As usual, he spends a ton of time here bragging about how little he cares about how the world sees him, but his reliance on the other f-bomb to keep our attention suggests otherwise". Chris Kelly of Fact said, "With Wolf, Tyler, the Creator is exciting again: maybe not as the ringleader of the Odd Future empire, but as a producer who just turned 22 (did you forget how young he actually is?), has internalized a decade of Neptunes / Doom / Def Jux production, and has Pharrell, Erykah, and (most importantly) Frank Ocean on speed dial. The don't-give-a-fuck attitude might have run its course lyrically, but when applying it as a production ethos, Tyler is just getting started".

=== Rankings ===
XXL ranked it number 18 on their list of the best albums of 2013. They commented saying, "The leader of the Odd Future crew's second album Wolf displayed radical maturity—both musically and lyrically; partnering with fellow Odd Future members Frank Ocean and Earl Sweatshirt, alongside Pharrell Williams and even Erykah Badu on songs involving gripping narratives of personal frustrations and heartbreak. Coupled with vivid lyrics and stark synth production, Tyler's fascinatingly still weird but insightful and musically pleasing". HipHopDX named it one of the top 25 albums of 2013. They elaborated saying, "Wolf was Tyler's most grown up effort to date. Developing into a fully realized production mastermind, he somehow tied a summer camp story in with his usual themes of relationships and the struggles of fame, not to mention the ghetto's crack epidemic and bullying leading to school shootings".

== Commercial performance ==
In the United States, Wolf debuted at number three on the Billboard 200, selling 89,000 copies in the first week. In its second week, the album sold 18,000 more copies bringing its sales total to 107,000 in the United States.

== Track listing ==
All songs written and produced by Tyler, the Creator, except where noted.

Wolf track listing
No.	Title	Writer(s)	Length
1.	"Wolf"		1:50
2.	"Jamba" (featuring Hodgy Beats)	Tyler Okonma; Gerard Long	3:32
3.	"Cowboy"		3:15
4.	"Awkward"		3:47
5.	"Domo23"		2:38
6.	"Answer"		3:50
7.	"Slater" (featuring Frank Ocean)	Okonma; Christopher Breaux	3:53
8.	"48"		4:07
9.	"Colossus"		3:33
10.	"PartyIsntOver / Campfire / Bimmer" (featuring Lætitia Sadier and Frank Ocean)	Okonma; Lætitia Sadier; Breaux	7:18
11.	"IFHY" (featuring Pharrell)	Okonma; Pharrell Williams	5:19
12.	"Pigs"		4:14
13.	"Parking Lot" (featuring Casey Veggies and Mike G)	Okonma; Casey Jones; Michael Griffin II	3:53
14.	"Rusty" (featuring Domo Genesis and Earl Sweatshirt)	Okonma; Dominique Cole; Thebe Kgositsile	5:09
15.	"Trashwang" (featuring Left Brain, Na-Kel, Jasper, Taco, L-Boy, Lucas and Lee Spielman)	Okonma; Na-Kel Smith; Davon Wilson; Lucas Vercetti; Lionel Boyce; Travis Bennett; Vyron Turner; Lee Spielman	4:42
16.	"Treehome95" (featuring Erykah Badu and Coco Owino)	Okonma; Erica Wright	3:00
17.	"Tamale"		2:46
18.	"Lone"		4:00
Total length:			71:17

Wolf DVD documentary bonus track
No.	Title	Writer(s)	Length
1.	"Girl 45 (Instrumental)"	Okonma	2:13

Instrumentals edition
No.	Title	Length
1.	"Wolf (Instrumental)"	1:50
2.	"Jamba (Instrumental)"	3:32
3.	"Cowboy (Instrumental)"	3:15
4.	"Awkward (Instrumental)"	3:47
5.	"Domo23 (Instrumental)"	2:38
6.	"Answer (Instrumental)"	3:50
7.	"Slater (Instrumental)"	3:53
8.	"48 (Instrumental)"	4:07
9.	"Colossus (Instrumental)"	3:33
10.	"PartyIsntOver (Instrumental)"	2:09
11.	"Campfire (Instrumental)"	2:29
12.	"Bimmer (Instrumental)"	2:27
13.	"IFHY (Instrumental)"	5:19
14.	"Pigs (Instrumental)"	4:14
15.	"Parking Lot (Instrumental)"	3:53
16.	"Rusty (Instrumental)"	5:09
17.	"Trashwang (Instrumental)"	4:42
18.	"Treehome95 (Instrumental)"	3:00
19.	"Tamale (Instrumental)"	2:46
20.	"Lone (Instrumental)"	4:00
Total length:		71:17

Sample credits

- "48" contains portions of an XXL interview between Tyler, the Creator and Nas.

== Personnel ==
Credits for Wolf adapted from CD liner notes.

=== Musicians ===
- Frank Ocean – additional vocals (4, 8)
- Syd Bennett – additional vocals (6)
- Colin Boyd – additional piano (9)
- Elijah & Parys Hall – additional vocals (10)
- Joslyn Leonti – additional vocals (10)
- Jason Dill – additional vocals (14)
- Tallulah – additional vocals (17)
- Lionel Boyce – additional vocals
- Sarah Parker – additional vocals

=== Technical ===
- Vic Wainstein – recording (all)
- Manny Marroquin – mixing (1, 7, 8, 10, 11, 16, 17)
- Trehy Harris – mix assistance (1–4, 12–15)
- Jaycen Joshua – mixing (2–5, 12–15)
- Andrew Dawson – mixing (6, 9, 10, 18)
- Chris Galland – mix assistance (7, 8, 10, 11, 16, 17)
- Delbert Bowers – mix assistance (7, 8, 10, 11, 16, 17)
- Sterling Winfield – recording (16)
- Phil Toselli – packaging layout
- Tyler, the Creator – packaging layout
- Brian "Big Bass" Gardner – mastering
- Bernie Grundman – mastering
- Eddy Tekeli – photography

== Charts ==
=== Weekly charts ===
2013 weekly chart performance for Wolf
Chart (2013)	Peak position
Australian Albums (ARIA)	19
Belgian Albums (Ultratop Flanders)	48
Canadian Albums (Billboard)	2
Danish Albums (Hitlisten)	10
Dutch Albums (Album Top 100)	86
French Albums (SNEP)	116
Irish Albums (IRMA)	46
Japanese Albums (Oricon)	111
New Zealand Albums (RMNZ)	30
Norwegian Albums (VG-lista)	15
Scottish Albums (Official Charts)	25
UK Albums (Official Charts)	17
UK R&B Albums (Official Charts)	2
US Billboard 200	3
US Top R&B/Hip-Hop Albums (Billboard)	2

2021 weekly chart performance for Wolf
Chart (2021)	Peak position
German Albums (Offizielle Top 100)	99

2023 weekly chart performance for Wolf
Chart (2023)	Peak position
US Top Catalog Albums (Billboard)	4

=== Year-end charts ===
2013 year-end chart performance for Wolf
Chart (2013)	Peak position
Australian Urban Albums (ARIA)	42
US Billboard 200	181
US Top R&B/Hip-Hop Albums (Billboard)	41

== Certifications ==
Certifications for Wolf
Region	Certification	Certified units/sales
Denmark (IFPI Danmark)	Gold	10,000^{‡}
New Zealand (RMNZ)	Gold	7,500^{‡}
United Kingdom (BPI)	Gold	100,000^{‡}
United States (RIAA)	Platinum	1,000,000^{‡}
^{‡} Sales+streaming figures based on certification alone.
