= WusYaName =

2021 single by Tyler, the Creator

Single by Tyler, the Creator featuring YoungBoy Never Broke Again and Ty Dolla Sign

from the album Call Me If You Get Lost
- Released: June 22, 2021
- Genre: West Coast hip hop; R&B
- Length: 2:01
- Label: Columbia
- Songwriters: Tyler Okonma; Kentrell Gaulden; Tyrone Griffin Jr.; Bishop Burrell Sr.; Delando Conner; Solomon Conner; Darryl Jackson
- Producer: Tyler, the Creator

Tyler, the Creator singles chronology
"Lumberjack" (2021)	"WusYaName" (2021)	"Cash In Cash Out" (2022)

YoungBoy Never Broke Again singles chronology
"Everything Different" (2021)	"WusYaName" (2021)	"Nevada" (2021)

Ty Dolla Sign singles chronology
"I Won" (2021)	"WusYaName" (2021)	"I Believed It" (2021)

Music video
- "WusYaName" on YouTube

"WusYaName" (stylized in all caps) is a song by American rapper and producer Tyler, the Creator featuring fellow American rapper YoungBoy Never Broke Again and American singer Ty Dolla $ign. It was released on June 22, 2021, alongside a retro-themed music video, as the second single from Tyler, the Creator's seventh studio album, Call Me If You Get Lost. A '90s-inspired R&B record, it samples H-Town's "Back Seat (Wit No Sheets)", and sees Tyler, the Creator rap-singing to a mysterious woman he becomes love-struck with while on a road trip. The song was noted for its production and Tyler, the Creator's delivery, and is the highest-charting track from the album. At the 64th Grammy Awards, the song was nominated for Best Melodic Rap Performance.

== Background ==
Tyler, the Creator first teased the song on June 22, 2021, when he posted the music video, which omitted YoungBoy's verse. Tyler, the Creator said one of his favorite moments on the album is when YoungBoy says "think so" on the song. Following the song's release, Tyler, the Creator, while at a pop-up concert, called YoungBoy a "sweetheart" and said they hung out a number of times. "WusYaName" was produced solely by Tyler, the Creator.

== Composition ==
Regarded as a departure from Tyler, the Creator's previous musical style, it contains G-funk synths and a "distinct throwback" sound, courtesy of the sampled track, "Back Seat (Wit No Sheets)" (1994) by R&B group H-Town, paired with a New Jack Swing-styled R&B. Ryan Rosenberger of Elevator Mag said the song "carries the same soulful, cinematic vibes as Igor did, with its lush, intricate vocal arrangements and hardknocking boombap drums". The song's intro starts off with a monologue by Tyler, the Creator in which he delves into California's car culture and reflects on having a love at first sight. After the monologue ends, the "romantic, '90s infused melody" kicks in, in the form of the repurposed sample which uses four loops in the song with a pitch and tempo increase. Deemed a "sexy", "flirty" R&B ballad, it sees Tyler, the Creator delivering his "signature" wordplay, rapping and singing about pouring syrup on eggs, looking for brioche a friend recommended, and envisioning flying the woman he likes to Cannes to watch independent movies. Furthermore, he lists off all the experiences and journeys he wants her to have, before realizing he is in over his head and does not even know her name, which leads into the chorus in which he asks her name. Tyler, the Creator affectionately refers to his romantic interest as "She". HipHopDX's Michael Saponara noted: "Tyler uses his verse as a lyrical exercise as he shows off his rhyming ability telling the girl they should go to Cannes to watch some movies they never heard of or how he could give her skincare routine tips". The song features background vocals from, among others, Ty Dolla Sign, Odd Future's Jasper Dolphin, a "wistful" rap verse from YoungBoy Never Broke Again, and ad-libs from DJ Drama.

== Critical reception ==
HipHopDX named "WusYaName" among the best hip hop songs of the first half of 2021, and said it "stands out with its lush instrumentation and teed up features from YoungBoy Never Broke Again and Ty Dolla $ign. Tyler always brings out the best in his guests and this is yet another example". Naming it among the best new releases of the week, Complex's Jessica McKinney called it a standout from Call Me If You Get Lost, lauding NBA YoungBoy for being in "rare form" on the track. Closed Cap was highly positive of the song, writing: "His (Tyler's) narrative is calming and sets the stage for his lyrical explosion. The beat is magical and flocked with nineties R&B while he raps like a machine gun over the music. Tyler is at the top of his game here lyrically and musically. The song pops with a fresh approach mixed with hints of nostalgia and works from the jump". Lyrical Lemonade's Danny Adams said the song is "gentle, soulful, and dreamy, much like many of his recent records have, and the swagger he has behind his delivery is unmatched".

== Music video ==
The song's official video was directed by Tyler, the Creator under his Wolf Haley moniker, alongside director of photography Luis Panch Perez and producer Tara Razavi. It features the same "grainy oversaturated visual style" of other videos from Call Me If You Get Lost. The video follows Tyler, the Creator as he drives through the countryside in a Lancia Delta Intergrale, arriving at a French patisserie, struggles to win over a woman who catches his eye, and, as Vulture's Zoe Haylock noted, appears in a "garden seating filled with black and brown people riding bikes, playing games, enjoying their day". Chron.com's Shelby Stewart summarized the ending: "the video concludes with a villain origin story plot twist: it turns out that Tyler, the Creator's crush was totally unaware of his singing". She instead walks to her date, Odd Future's Taco Bennett, who sits at a table nearby. Like all videos for the album, it ended with the Call Me If You Get Lost jingle. It was suggested that the video is a prequel to "Side Street", a teaser video Tyler, the Creator released prior to the album, as both videos feature the same woman (played by Helena Howard) as Tyler, the Creator's love interest and sees him sport the same mint-green nail polish. Closed Cap commended the video for having "a flair of style you don't commonly see today", emphasizing: "Even the shots of the hills as he drives are done so with prestige and professionalism".

== Chart performance ==
The song debuted at number 14 on the Billboard Hot 100, becoming the highest-charting song from Call Me If You Get Lost. On the Rolling Stone Top 100, it was the highest entry from the album, debuting at number four with 19 million streams. In the UK, the song also had the biggest success, debuting at number 25.

== Charts ==
=== Weekly charts ===
Weekly chart performance for "WusYaName"
Chart (2021)	Peak position
Australia (ARIA)	22
Canada Hot 100 (Billboard)	22
Global 200 (Billboard)	19
Ireland (IRMA)	24
Lithuania (AGATA)	24
Netherlands (Single Top 100)	89
New Zealand (Recorded Music NZ)	14
Portugal (AFP)	51
Sweden Heatseeker (Sverigetopplistan)	16
UK Singles (Official Charts)	25
UK Hip Hop/R&B (Official Charts)	7
US Billboard Hot 100	14
US Hot R&B/Hip-Hop Songs (Billboard)	6
US Rhythmic Airplay (Billboard)	23
US Rolling Stone Top 100	4

=== Year-end charts ===
Year-end chart performance for "WusYaName"
Chart (2021)	Position
US Hot R&B/Hip-Hop Songs (Billboard)	99

== Certifications ==
Certifications for "WusYaName"
Region	Certification	Certified units/sales
Canada (Music Canada)	Gold	40,000^{‡}
New Zealand (RMNZ)	Platinum	30,000^{‡}
United Kingdom (BPI)	Silver	200,000^{‡}
United States (RIAA)	2× Platinum	2,000,000^{‡}
^{‡} Sales+streaming figures based on certification alone.

== Release history ==
Release dates and formats for "WusYaName"
Region	Date	Format	Label	Ref.
United States	July 13, 2021	Urban contemporary radio	Columbia	
