= Sorry Not Sorry (Tyler, the Creator song) =

2023 single by Tyler, the Creator

Single by Tyler, the Creator

from the album Call Me If You Get Lost: The Estate Sale
- Released: March 29, 2023
- Genre: Hip hop
- Length: 3:26
- Label: Columbia
- Songwriters: Tyler Okonma; Franchone Shells; Lucille White
- Producer: Okonma

Tyler, the Creator singles chronology
"Dogtooth" (2023)	"Sorry Not Sorry" (2023)	"Noid" (2024)

Music video
- "SORRY NOT SORRY" on YouTube

"Sorry Not Sorry" is a song by American rapper and producer Tyler, the Creator, released on March 27, 2023, as the second single (fourth overall) from The Estate Sale deluxe version of his seventh studio album Call Me If You Get Lost (2021).

== Background ==
On March 27, 2023, Tyler tweeted that his 2021 album Call Me If You Get Lost was his first album where he had many songs that did not make it onto the official release of the project. He said "some of those songs I really love, and knew they would never see the light of day, so Ive decided to put a few of them out. [sic]" Following the release of "Dogtooth", the song was released as the second single for the deluxe version of Call Me If You Get Lost.

== Composition ==
"Sorry Not Sorry" features a "luscious combination of warm guitar progressions and soulful background vocals with an orchestral touch". Lyrically, it finds Tyler, the Creator apologizing to many people for his flaws – his family (especially his mother), old friends and lovers for being remote and egoistic, the people he has tried to hide his sexuality from (also dealing with his struggles of coming into it), the Earth (for buying climate-destroying cars), his old fans "who said I changed" and ancestors (for not properly honoring them). Eventually, Tyler focuses on the successes in his career and dismissing the criticism.

== Critical reception ==
Aron A. of HotNewHipHop gave the song a "Very Hottttt" rating and wrote, "The production serves as an excellent soundscape for his confessional of sorts." Similarly, Jordan Darville of The Fader commented "The frayed, blown-out Dilla-ness of the beat is a nice detour for Tyler" and also called the music video "excellent as always".

== Music video ==
An official music video was directed by Tyler, the Creator himself and released alongside the single. It begins with different people such as Tyler's mom, his ancestors, and people he has had past relationships with entering a theatrical box where velvet-red curtains pull back to reveal a desert set, with multiple alter-egos representing each of Tyler's albums. A shirtless Tyler appears alongside them, as each of them speak to the audience during the song. Throughout the video, each one of Tyler's personas suddenly disappear from the stage, the reason being that the rapper himself is taking them away and killing them. In the end, the rapper attacks his alternate self Tyler Baudelaire (from the Call Me If You Get Lost era), viciously beating him to death as the crowd disappears.

== Charts ==
Chart performance for "Sorry Not Sorry"
Chart (2023)	Peak position
Canada Hot 100 (Billboard)	53
Global 200 (Billboard)	91
Lithuania (AGATA)	59
New Zealand Hot Singles (RMNZ)	3
UK Singles (Official Charts)	63
US Billboard Hot 100	48
US Hot R&B/Hip-Hop Songs (Billboard)	16

== Certifications ==
Region	Certification	Certified units/sales
United States (RIAA)	Gold	500,000^{‡}
^{‡} Sales+streaming figures based on certification alone.
