= Tamale (song) =

2013 song by Tyler, the Creator

- Promotional cover art for the music video

Song by Tyler, the Creator

from the album Wolf
- Released: April 2, 2013
- Genre: Hip hop
- Length: 2:46
- Label: Odd Future
- Songwriter: Tyler Okonma
- Producers: Tyler, the Creator

Music video
- "Tamale" on YouTube

"Tamale" is a hip-hop song by the American rapper and producer Tyler, the Creator, released as the seventeenth and penultimate track from his third studio album Wolf (2013). The song was solely written and produced by Tyler, the Creator, and was released with the rest of its parent album on April 2, 2013.

== Composition ==
The song contains "aggressive percussion which bounces around", which also describes Tyler, the Creator's flow on the track. The lyrics involve Tyler rapping about controversial topics, such as using euphemisms for private body parts, masturbation, and calling film director Spike Lee a racial slur. The hook features shrill vocals from actress Tallulah Willis, which has been considered an imitation of the British rapper M.I.A.

== Critical reception ==
Birkut of Tiny Mix Tapes described the song as "overly flamboyant", while Chris Kelly of Fact described it as "vaguely exotic". James McKenna of No Ripcord remarked the combination of the song's production and rapping is "an entirely abrasive sound that's easy to hate when you first hear it, but somehow it grows on you. It's still kinda intensely annoying, yet impossible to dismiss." Andy Baber of MusicOMH regarded the song's high-pitched vocals to be "mildly irritating". Beats Per Minute's Harriet Suits Baer cited the song as one of the many tracks from Wolf which she considered not worth listening to. In an album review for Los Angeles Times, Randall Roberts considered "Tamale" among the best of the "minimal tracks with wobbly time signatures that are naturally unbalanced" and wrote it "illustrates a musician taking rhythmic chances to great success, even if they're hobbled by an unfortunate flatness."

== Music video ==
The music video was self-directed by Tyler, the Creator under his directing alias, "Wolf Haley", and was released on October 8, 2013. It also serves as the music video for the sixth track on Wolf, "Answer".

=== Synopsis ===
The video opens with three floating heads of Tyler rapping parts of the first verse in an orange background. The clip then switches to a blurred visual of two people dancing, wearing blackface, then smashing a watermelon with a sledgehammer, which Tyler claims was censored due to its "graphic nature," further adding that "people aren't ready to have intelligent conversations before they judge." The next scene sees a miniaturized Tyler bouncing on bikini-clad video vixen Bria Myles' butt as if on a trampoline, further adding on to the statement in the previous clip, stating, "But this shit is allowed." In other shots, he reenacts one of the Wolf album covers; runs wild with Lee Spielman of Trash Talk while wearing all yellow on a golf court, where he also eats an apple and uses a golf cart; rides on a giant tabby cat; is underwater at a pool party; wears whiteface and appears bald as he leads a marching band. He would use later this same whiteface persona in his music video for the song "Buffalo" off his next album Cherry Bomb. The video ends with Tyler reading a book titled Homophobia Beans Misogyny Bad 666 Gimmick in bed while using his own lotion brand and experiencing a simulated orgasm. Following this, the video then transitions to another, shorter, music video for the track from Wolf, "Answer". During performances the song is used as a transition into "Answer."

== Charts ==
Chart performance for "Tamale"
Chart (2013)	Peak position
US Bubbling Under R&B/Hip-Hop Songs (Billboard)	3

== Certifications ==
Certifications for "Tamale"
Region	Certification	Certified units/sales
United States (RIAA)	Gold	500,000^{‡}
^{‡} Sales+streaming figures based on certification alone.
