= Tyler, the Creator =

American rapper and producer (born 1991)

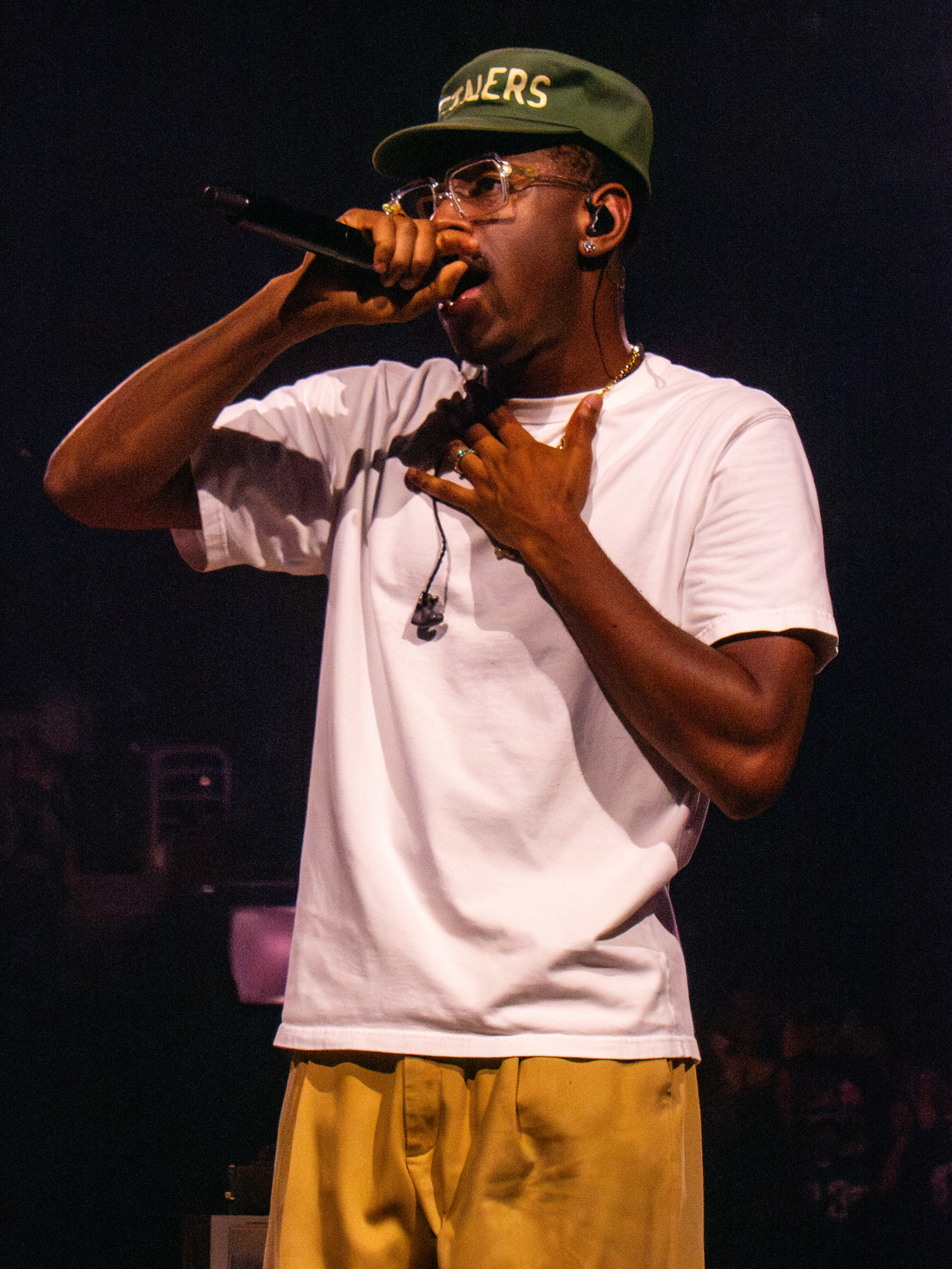
- Tyler, the Creator in 2025
- Born: Tyler Gregory Okonma; March 6, 1991 (age 35); Hawthorne, California, U.S.
- Other names: Tyler Haley; Wolf Haley; Bunnyhop; Poly/Mono; Felicia the goat; Ace, the Creator; ThrashPolo; Young Nigga; DJ Stank Daddy
- Occupations: Rapper; singer; songwriter; record producer; director; fashion designer; actor
- Years active: 2007–present
- Organization: Golf Wang
- Works: Discography; production; songs
- Awards: Full list
- Musical career
- Genres: Alternative hip-hop; neo soul; R&B; West Coast hip-hop; jazz rap; hardcore hip-hop; horrorcore (early)
- Instruments: Vocals; piano; keyboards
- Labels: Columbia; Odd Future; Sony; RED; XL
- Formerly of: Odd Future; I Smell Panties
- Website: golfwang.com; golflefleur.com

Tyler Gregory Okonma (born March 6, 1991), known professionally as Tyler, the Creator, is an American rapper, singer, record producer, and fashion designer. He is known for his eclectic and experimental music, raw lyrical style, and frequent use of alter egos and alternate personas across his albums. During the 2010s and 2020s, he was described as an influential figure in alternative hip-hop.

In the late 2000s, Okonma co-founded and led the music collective Odd Future. As a member of the group, he worked as a rapper, producer, director, and actor, and produced studio albums for several of its members. He also appeared on the group's sketch comedy series Loiter Squad (2012–2014). Alongside his work with Odd Future, he developed a solo career with his self-released debut studio album, Bastard (2009). His second studio album, Goblin (2011), brought him mainstream attention, largely through the success of the single "Yonkers" and its music video. During this period, he attracted attention over his controversial horrorcore-influenced sound and violent, transgressive lyrics.

After releasing his third studio album, Wolf (2013), Tyler moved away from horrorcore and began incorporating elements of jazz, soul, and R&B. He followed with Cherry Bomb (2015), which included guest appearances from Lil Wayne and Kanye West. In 2017, Flower Boy received widespread critical acclaim and commercial success. Igor (2019) and Call Me If You Get Lost (2021) both debuted atop the Billboard 200 and won Best Rap Album at the 62nd and 64th Grammy Awards, respectively. His later albums, Chromakopia (2024) and Don't Tap the Glass (2025), also debuted at number one in the U.S., with Chromakopia recording the strongest first-week sales of his career.

Beyond music, Tyler founded the clothing brands Golf Wang and Le Fleur, and has collaborated with Lacoste, Converse, and Louis Vuitton. He is also the founder of the Camp Flog Gnaw Carnival, an annual music festival launched in 2012 that has featured performers including Kanye West, Drake, Kendrick Lamar, Lana Del Rey, and Billie Eilish. Under the pseudonym Wolf Haley, he has directed all of his music and promotional videos. In 2025, he made his feature film debut as Wally in Josh Safdie's Marty Supreme, under his birth name.

Tyler has won three Grammy Awards, three BET Hip Hop Awards, a Brit Award, and an MTV Video Music Award. In 2019, The Wall Street Journal named him "Music Innovator of the Year", and in 2024, the Los Angeles Times featured him in its "L.A. Influential" series as a "creator who is leaving [his] mark" on Los Angeles.

== Early life and education ==
Tyler Gregory Okonma was born on March 6, 1991, in Hawthorne, California, a suburb of Los Angeles. He is the son of a Nigerian Igbo father and an African-American mother who is half-Canadian and multiracial. He spent his early life living in Hawthorne before moving to Ladera Heights at 17. At the age of seven, Okonma took covers out of CD cases and created covers for his own imaginary albums—including a tracklist with song lengths—before he could make music. He produced his first beat, on FL Studio, at age 12. At the age of 14, he taught himself to play the piano.

In his 12 years of schooling, Okonma attended 12 different schools in the Los Angeles and Sacramento areas. In the eighth grade, he joined a drama class and was removed for being too hyperactive, while in the ninth grade, he was not allowed to join the band class because he could not read music. He attended Westchester High School, where he befriended Lionel Boyce in a theater class.

Okonma worked at FedEx for under two weeks, and at Starbucks for over two years. He took his stage name from a Myspace page he used to post his creative endeavors.

When Okonma was 15, he had a YouTube channel named "bloxhead". His first YouTube video was released on February 28, 2008. He posted videos until October 2009, when he stopped uploading to focus on his debut album, Bastard. The channel was originally titled "I Smell Panties" named after his comedy hip-hop duo group with Jasper Dolphin.

== Career ==
=== 2007–2011: Odd Future, Bastard, and Goblin ===
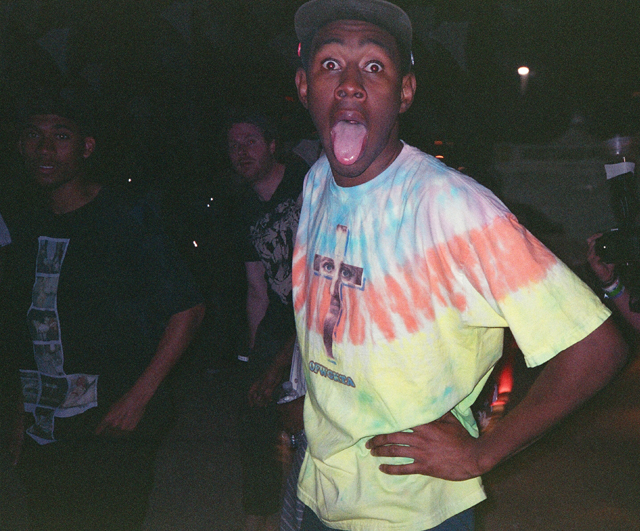
Tyler in April 2011

Tyler co-founded the alternative hip-hop collective Odd Future in 2007, alongside Hodgy, Left Brain, and Casey Veggies. They self-released their debut mixtape, The Odd Future Tape, in November 2008. On December 25, 2009, Tyler self-released his first album, Bastard. It was eventually ranked 32nd on Pitchfork Media's list of the Top Albums of 2010. On February 11, 2011, Tyler released the music video for "Yonkers". The video received attention from several online media outlets. An extended version with a third verse was made available on iTunes. Tyler won Best New Artist for "Yonkers" at the 2011 MTV Video Music Awards. Tyler's thematic content in these first two solo projects led fans and publications alike to categorize him in the horrorcore scene, although he vehemently rejected his connection with it.

In early 2011, Tyler was gaining the interest of a number of figures in the music industry, including Steve Rifkind, Jimmy Iovine, Rick Ross and Jay-Z. Tyler and the rest of Odd Future eventually signed a deal with Red Distribution/Sony in April 2011. His second studio album, Goblin, was released May 10, 2011. Tyler and fellow Odd Future member Hodgy Beats made their television debut on February 16, 2011, when they performed "Sandwitches" on Late Night with Jimmy Fallon. On March 16, Tyler and Hodgy performed "Yonkers" and "Sandwitches" at the 2011 mtvU Woodie Awards, being joined by other members of Odd Future during "Sandwitches". During an interview with Tyler for Interview, Waka Flocka Flame expressed his interest in collaborating with the Odd Future frontman to direct a music video for him. In early 2011, Tyler told fans through his Formspring account that his third album would be called Wolf and it was scheduled to be released in May 2012. Tyler also announced that Odd Future would establish their own TV show called Loiter Squad. On September 8, 2011, the show was finally confirmed as a 15-minute live-action show composed of various sketches, man on the street segments, pranks and music made by Odd Future. Dickhouse Productions, the production partnership that created Jackass, was scheduled to produce the show.

=== 2012–2014: Wolf and Loiter Squad TV show ===
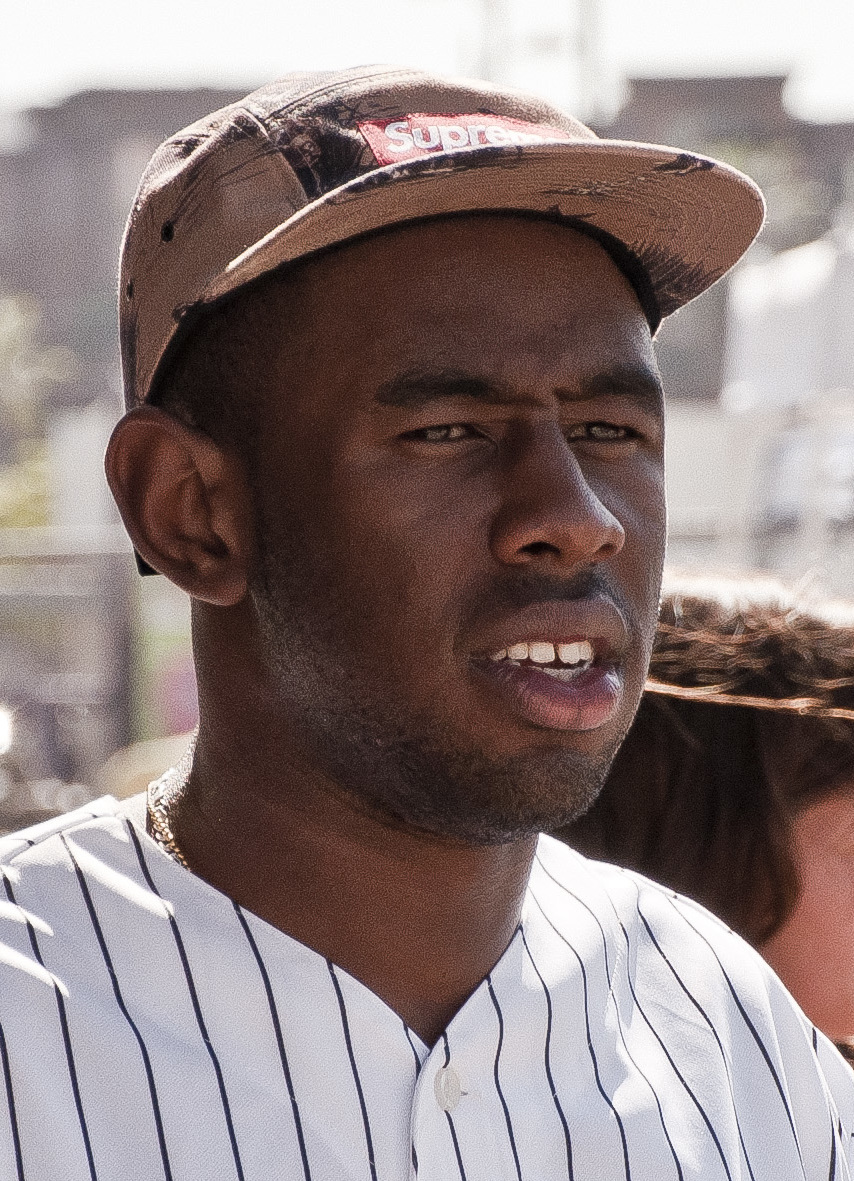
Tyler in September 2012

Odd Future's television show Loiter Squad premiered on Adult Swim on March 25, 2012. The show ran for three seasons and featured guest appearances from celebrities, including Johnny Knoxville, Lil Wayne and Seth Rogen. In 2015, Tyler stated that the show "is no more". On February 14, 2013, Odd Future uploaded a video to their YouTube account, which includes L-Boy skydiving and stating that Wolf would be released on April 2, 2013. The same day, Tyler would reveal the three album covers via his Instagram account.

In promotion of Wolf, Tyler performed several guest verses for other artists, notably "Trouble on My Mind" by GOOD Music artist Pusha T, "Martians vs. Goblins" by The Game (also featuring Lil Wayne), "I'ma Hata" by DJ Drama (also featuring Waka Flocka Flame and D-Bo), the title track from fellow Odd Future member Domo Genesis' collaboration album with The Alchemist, No Idols, and "Blossom & Burn" by Trash Talk (also featuring Hodgy Beats). Tyler also co-produced the song "666" from MellowHype's third album Numbers, which featured Mike G. Through March and April 2013, Tyler toured North America and Europe. The first single from the album was released on February 14, 2013, titled "Domo23" along with the music video which features cameos from Domo Genesis, Earl Sweatshirt, Jasper Dolphin and Taco Bennett. On February 26, 2013, Tyler performed the songs "Domo23" and "Treehome95" on Late Night with Jimmy Fallon.

Wolf was released on April 2, 2013, by Odd Future Records and RED Distribution under Sony Music Entertainment. It featured guest appearances by Frank Ocean, Mike G, Domo Genesis, Earl Sweatshirt, Left Brain, Hodgy Beats, Pharrell, Casey Veggies and Erykah Badu. The album was produced solely by Tyler, except for the final track "Lone". Along with the lead single "Domo23", music videos were filmed for "Bimmer", "IFHY" and "Jamba". Upon release, the album was met with generally positive reviews and debuted at number three on the Billboard 200, selling 90,000 copies in its first week. On January 31, 2014, Tyler was reported to be working with Mac DeMarco.

=== 2015–2016: Cherry Bomb ===
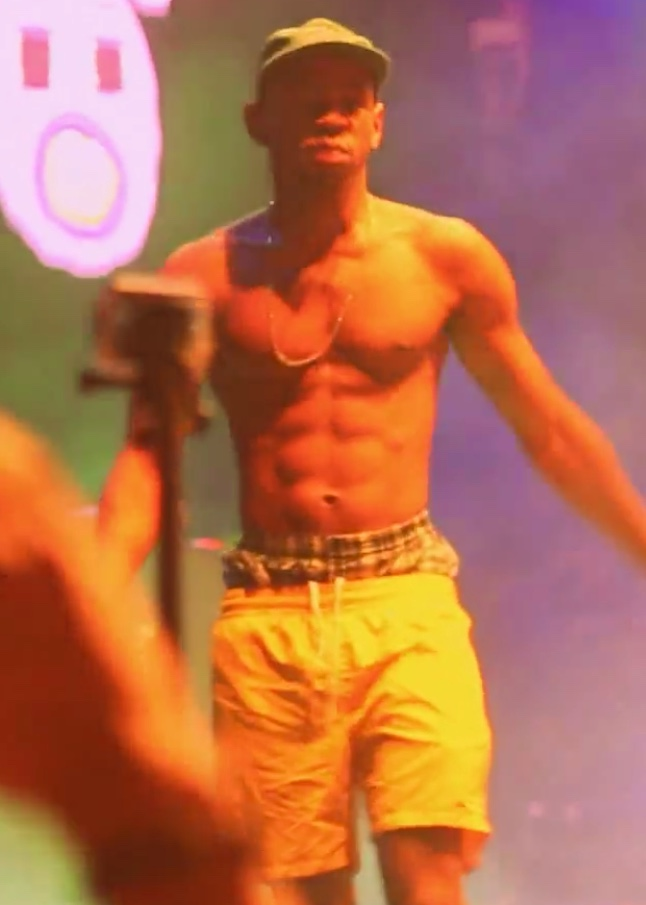
Tyler performing Cherry Bomb in Moscow in August 2015

On April 9, 2015, Tyler released the music video for the song "Fucking Young" to Odd Future's official YouTube channel. The video also included a short snippet of another song, "Deathcamp". Tyler announced on the same day that the songs will be featured on his upcoming album Cherry Bomb, set for release on April 13, 2015. Tyler announced via his Twitter account that the album would feature Charlie Wilson, Chaz Bundick and Black Lips member Cole Alexander. Two days later, Tyler performed the songs "Fucking Young" and "Deathcamp" for the first time at Coachella. During the set, Tyler notably criticized VIP members in the audience, of which many were celebrities, for their lack of enthusiasm.

Cherry Bomb was released digitally on April 13, 2015, through Odd Future Records, with physical copies of the album, featuring five different album covers, set to be released on April 28, 2015. The album features performances from notable artists such as Kanye West, Lil Wayne and Schoolboy Q. The album was supported by a world tour through North America, Europe and Asia, beginning at Coachella Festival on April 11, 2015, and ending in Tokyo, Japan in September 2015. Tyler cancelled the Australian leg of his Cherry Bomb World Tour following a campaign by the grassroots organization Collective Shout to bar him from returning to Australia due to their opinion that his music promotes and glorifies violence against women.

On August 26, 2015, Tyler revealed that he had been banned from visiting the United Kingdom for three to five years, which forced him to cancel a string of tour dates supporting the Cherry Bomb album, including the Reading and Leeds Festivals. The reason for the ban came from lyrics dating back to 2009. His manager Christian Clancy said they were informed of the ban via a letter from then-Home Secretary Theresa May. May cited lyrics from the album Bastard as the reason for the ban, although Tyler had toured multiple times in the UK since its release. Tyler later claimed that he felt he had been treated "like a terrorist" and implied that the ban was racially motivated, stating that "they did not like the fact that their children were idolizing a black man".

=== 2017–2018: Flower Boy, television, and WANG$AP ===
On April 8, 2017, Frank Ocean released a song titled "Biking" on his Beats 1 radio station "Blonded Radio", which features both Tyler, the Creator, and Jay-Z. Eight days later it was announced Tyler would write, produce, and perform the theme song for scientist Bill Nye's new show, Bill Nye Saves the World. On June 28, the trailer for Tyler's TV show Nuts + Bolts premiered on Viceland. The show focuses on things Tyler, the Creator, finds interesting or is passionate about, and explains how they are created. The series premiered on August 3, 2017.

On June 29, 2017, Tyler released the song "Who Dat Boy" featuring ASAP Rocky on a new YouTube channel, following many promotional countdown posts on his social media accounts. Later that night, he released the song on streaming services alongside a new song titled "911 / Mr. Lonely" featuring Steve Lacy, Frank Ocean, and Anna of the North. On July 6, 2017, he announced the title, tracklist and release date of his fifth album, Flower Boy, which was released on July 21, 2017. Several singles were released following up to the album's release date, including "Boredom" and "I Ain't Got Time!". The album was released via iTunes, Spotify, and other major music services. On September 14, 2017, Tyler, the Creator, announced his third TV show to date, The Jellies!. It premiered on October 22, 2017. Flower Boy received rave reviews from critics and was nominated for Best Rap Album at the 60th Annual Grammy Awards, giving Tyler his second Grammy nomination after contributing to 2013 Album of the Year nominee Channel Orange, but was beat out by Kendrick Lamar's fourth studio album Damn.

On March 29, 2018, Tyler released "Okra", among a string of freestyles and remixes. Tyler referred to it as a "throwaway song", stating that it was not going to be included on any upcoming album, and was not an indication of the sound of any future projects. On May 22, 2018, he released "435", continuing this string of singles. On July 23, 2018, Tyler and ASAP Rocky announced a collaborative project, WANG$AP, by releasing a music video for a remix of Monica's "Knock Knock" called "Potato Salad" on "AWGE DVD (Vol. 3)", a video compilation by AWGE, ASAP Rocky's creative agency.

=== 2019–2023: Igor and Call Me If You Get Lost ===
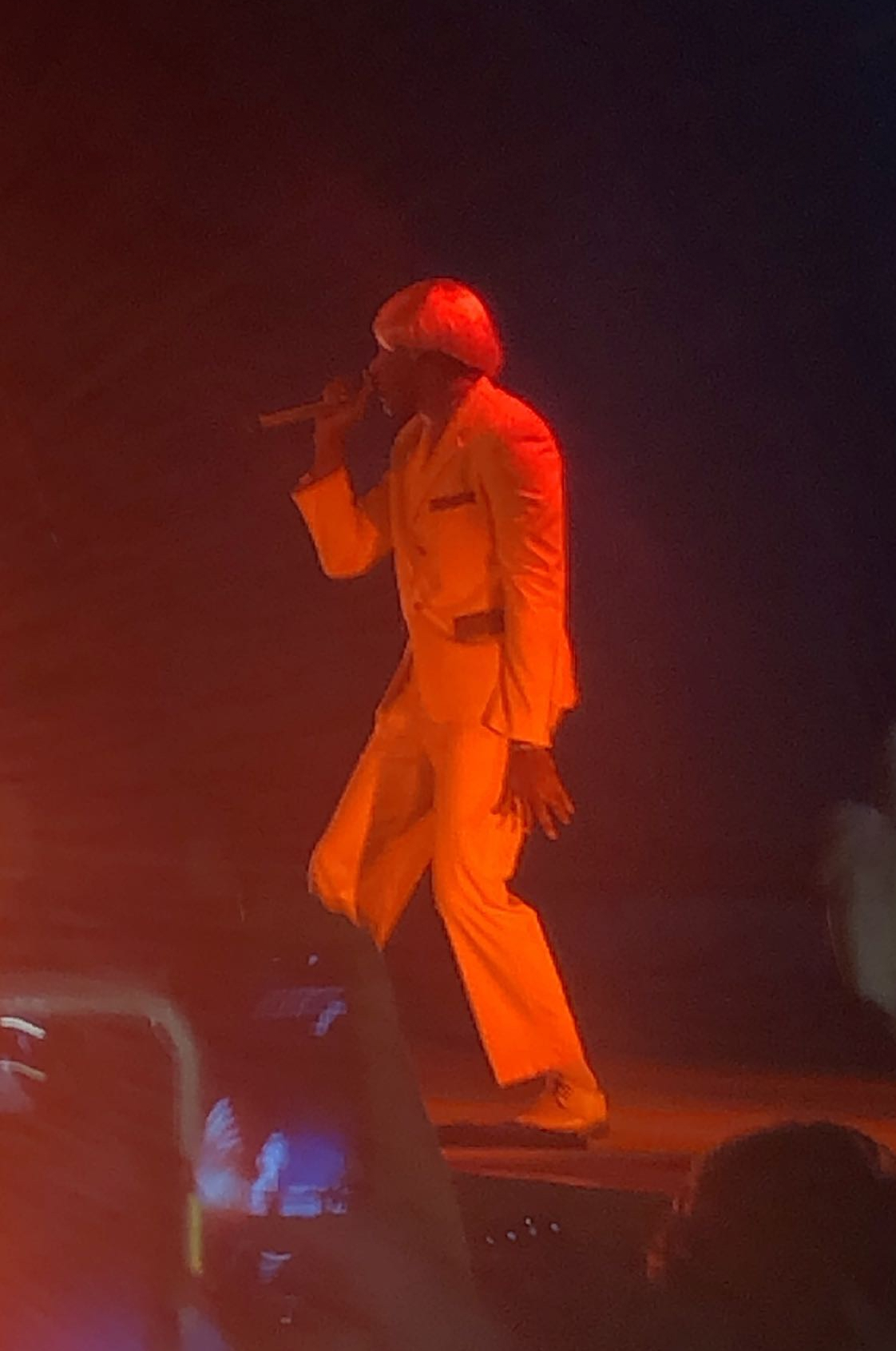
Tyler performing in Pittsburgh in 2019

On May 6, 2019, Tyler released two short video clips on his online profiles which featured new music. The videos showed him dancing erratically while wearing a long blonde wig, multicolored suit, black sunglasses, and a grill; he donned the same style for pictures on his social media and the music videos for the album's singles. He soon announced his sixth studio album, Igor, which was released on May 17. Igor was met with widespread critical acclaim and debuted at number one on the US Billboard 200, becoming Tyler's first number-one album in the United States. The album also features the song "Earfquake", which peaked at number 13 on the Billboard Hot 100. On December 23, 2019, Tyler released two songs, "Best Interest", a song that did not make the cut of Igor that was released with a music video, and "Group B".

On January 26, 2020, Tyler won his first-ever Grammy at the 62nd Grammy Awards, winning Best Rap Album for Igor. Tyler admitted that while he was "very grateful" for his win, the categorizing of his music as rap is a "backhanded compliment". "It sucks that whenever we — and I mean guys that look like me — do anything that's genre-bending or that's anything they always put it in a rap or urban category. I don't like that 'urban' word — it's just a politically correct way to say the n-word to me," he said. He also added that he would love to be recognized on a more mainstream level and not forever pigeonholed in "urban" categories.

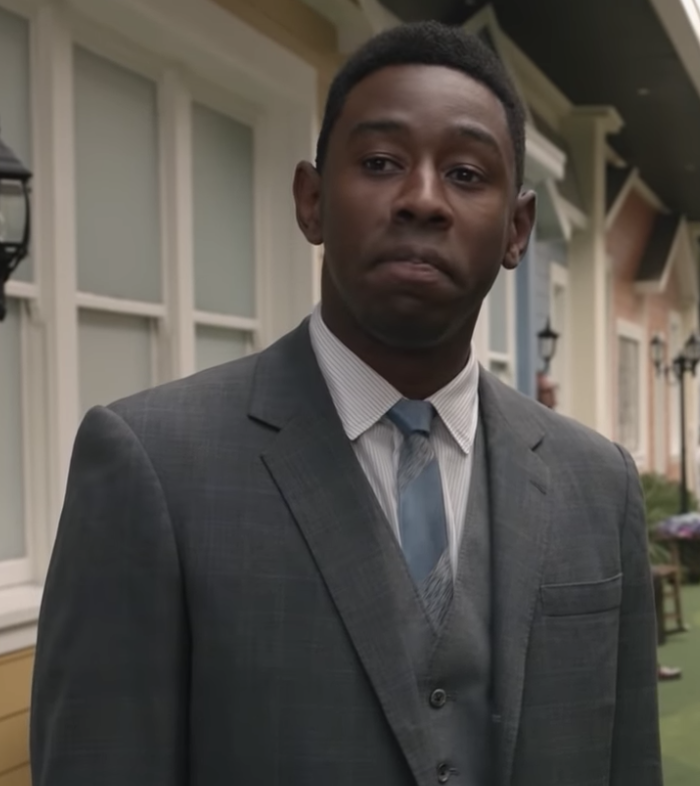
Tyler as Cornell on the Showtime comedy-drama series Kidding, 2020

For his seventh studio album, Call Me If You Get Lost, Tyler placed billboards in major cities across the world containing a phone number that when called, played a recorded conversation between Tyler and his mother. That recording is included in the album as "Momma Talk". Soon after the billboards were spotted, a website of the same name was discovered. The album's lead single, "Lumberjack", was released on June 16. The following day, Tyler revealed the album's cover and confirmed its release date of June 25. Upon release, it received widespread critical acclaim and debuted at number one on the US Billboard 200, becoming Tyler's second number-one album in the United States. On January 5, 2022, Tyler, the Creator, was announced as a headliner of Louisville's Forecastle Festival scheduled for May 27–29, 2022.

Louis Vuitton's Men's Fall-Winter 2022 fashion show, held at Carreau du Temple, Paris was one of the last shows put together by the late fashion designer and Louis Vuitton creative director Virgil Abloh. This show was scored by Tyler, the Creator. His score was arranged by Arthur Verocai and it was Gustavo Dudamel who conducted the live performance by the Chineke! Orchestra.

On March 25, 2022, Tyler appeared on two tracks off Nigo's album I Know Nigo!, the opening track "Lost and Found Freestyle 2019" with A$AP Rocky, and the closer, "Come On, Let's Go", the latter of which was released along with a music video showcasing Tyler's Golf le Fleur* clothing line. Call Me If You Get Lost won the award for Best Rap Album at the 64th Grammy Awards.

On March 27, 2023, Tyler revealed Call Me If You Get Lost: The Estate Sale, which would include songs recorded for Call Me If You Get Lost but did not appear on the final album, including the single "Dogtooth", which was released on the day of the announcement, alongside a music video. On Twitter, Tyler stated that "Call Me If You Get Lost was the first album I made with a lot of songs that didn't make the final cut". On March 29, 2023, another single "Sorry Not Sorry" was released, alongside a music video. The Estate Sale was released on March 31, 2023, along with a music video for the song "Wharf Talk".

=== 2024–present: Chromakopia and Don't Tap the Glass ===
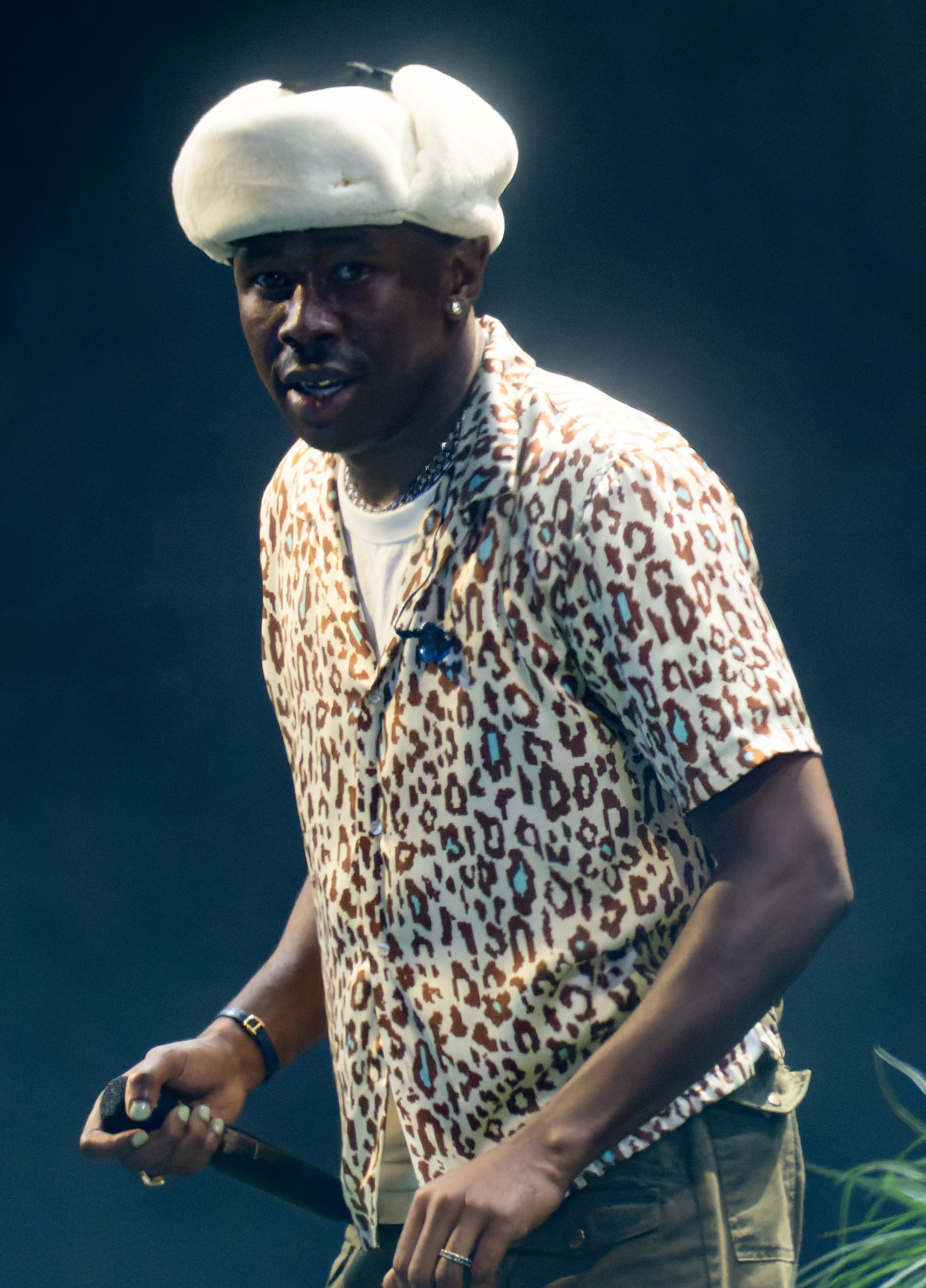
Tyler at Primavera Sound 2022

On April 13, 2024, Tyler performed a headliner set at Coachella, closing out Saturday night with a performance that included guest appearances from Childish Gambino, ASAP Rocky, and Kali Uchis along with a duet of "Earfquake" with Charlie Wilson. He began the set bursting through the wall of a fake trailer using pyrotechnics, before performing tracks from across his discography. Critics labeled the performance as an "exhilarating, high-stakes spectacle", and a "brilliant reminder of a cult hero's power".

On October 16, 2024, Tyler revealed the name of his next album as Chromakopia in a teaser video titled "St. Chroma". On October 21, Tyler released the single, "Noid". The album was released on October 28. Following this, Tyler performed the album at smaller venues and in public. He also performed the album at the 10th edition of the Camp Flog Gnaw Carnival on November 16. He announced Chromakopia: The World Tour, his seventh headlining concert tour in support of the album on October 23, 2024. It started on February 4, 2025, in Saint Paul and concluded on March 31, 2026, at the José Miguel Agrelot Coliseum in San Juan, Puerto Rico. He also announced that Lil Yachty and Paris Texas would serve as supporting acts for the tour.

Tyler made a guest appearance on Clipse's fifth album, Let God Sort Em Out on the album's third track, "P.O.V." Unbeknownst to many of his fans, Tyler began work in January on Don't Tap the Glass, his ninth album while on tour. On Instagram and Twitter, he began teasing its release as well as erecting an art installation outside the venue during a concert on July 18. On July 19, a website (donttaptheglass.com) was established and all products from the Golf Wang website were briefly removed and were replaced with merchandise for the album, including a pre-order for a vinyl and CD format of the album. On the eve of the album's release, Tyler held a listening party for 300 guests at the Hollywood Forever Cemetery, disallowing phones and camera from the venue. The album was released on July 21 through Columbia Records and received generally positive reviews, critics describing it as a dance, techno and house album. A music video was uploaded to YouTube for the track "Stop Playing With Me", with Clipse, LeBron James and Maverick Carter appearing in the video. Following its release, Tyler said his inspiration for the album was video recording at concerts, attributing it to the decline of dancing publicly. He encouraged listeners to enjoy the album "at full volume" and to dance while doing so.

On August 12, 2025, Tyler released the self-directed video for "Sugar on My Tongue," featuring a provocative and surreal narrative set in a white-tiled room, blending elements of rave culture, BDSM, and absurdist humor, as part of Don't Tap the Glass. The song also spent seventeen weeks on the Billboard Top 100, marking Tyler's longest-charting song. Tyler also made his feature film debut, starring in the A24 sports film Marty Supreme alongside Timothée Chalamet. On November 20, Tyler was named Apple Music's Artist of the Year for 2025. On November 7, Tyler earned six nominations for the 68th Annual Grammy awards for his work on Chromakopia and Don't Tap the Glass, including Album of the Year and Best Rap Album for Chromakopia, Best Alternative Music album for Don't Tap the Glass, and Best Rap Song and Best Rap Performance for his songs "Sticky" and "Darling, I", respectively. At the awards show on February 1, Tyler was nominated for the inaugural Best Album Cover category for Chromakopia, winning and marking his third Grammy Award. He also performed his songs "Thought I Was Dead" and "Sugar on My Tongue" at the main award ceremony. He designed the 1908 Pro Leather shoe in collaboration with Converse, which released in July 2026.

== Artistry ==
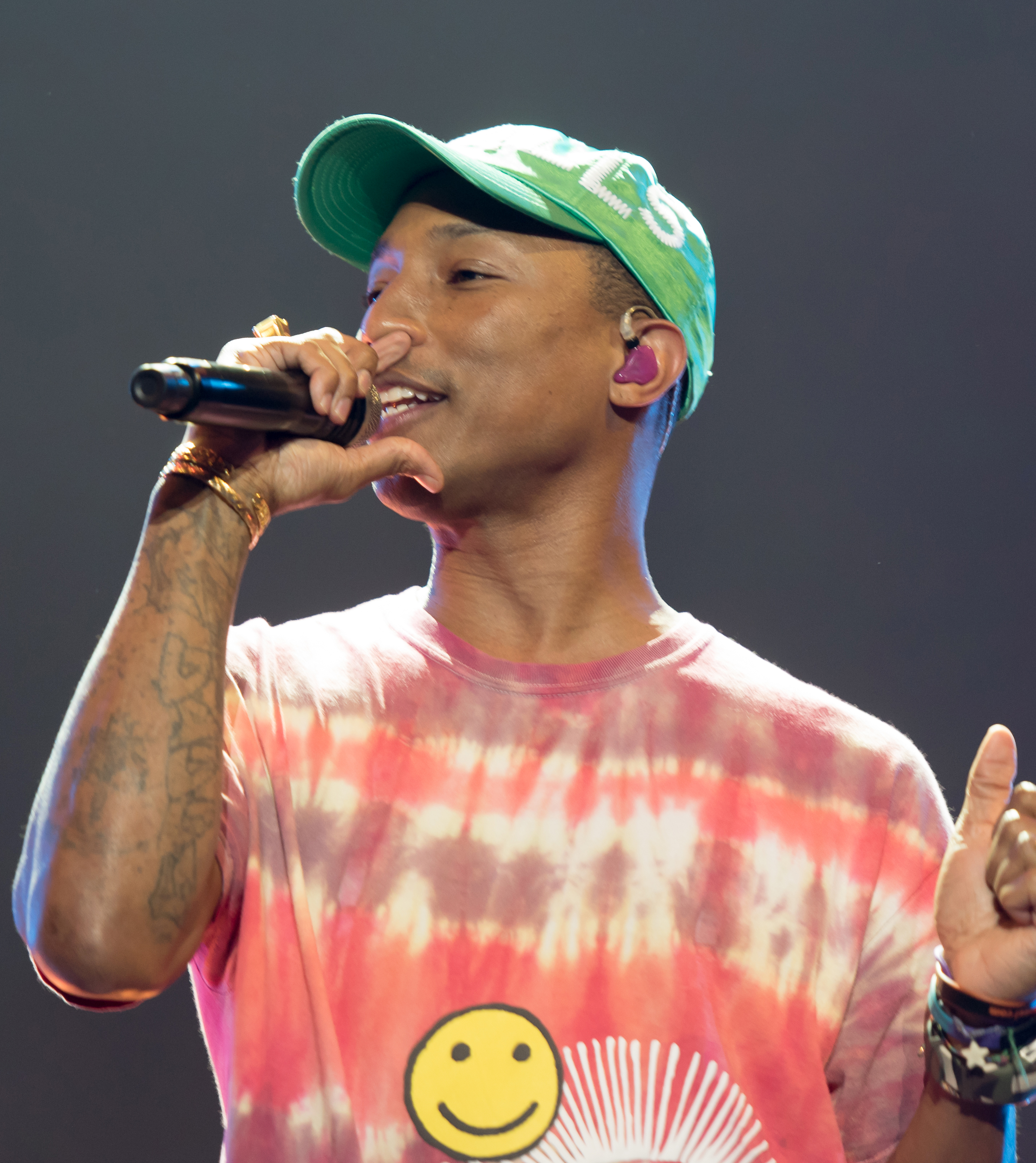
Pharrell Williams has been one of the greatest inspirations and references for Tyler.

Tyler's music has been described as alternative hip-hop, hip-hop, neo soul, West Coast hip-hop, jazz rap, and hardcore hip-hop, while his early music has been described as horrorcore. When Tyler emerged on the music scene as a "strange figure" of the Internet and one of the leaders of the music collective Odd Future, his musical productions instinctively became noted for resembling those of Pharrell Williams and his works in N.E.R.D and The Neptunes during the 2000s, which Tyler has referenced as his greatest inspirations and references. The horrorcore-based aesthetics and transgressive lyrical content of his debut and second albums Bastard and Goblin were influenced by Eminem, especially his album Relapse (2009), which according to Tyler, is one of his favorites. When asked about the reason for his offensive content in his lyrics, Tyler responded that "they are not offensive" and that "I just like to piss off old white dudes." The "nihilistic" and dark aesthetic of his early work was heavily criticized in online music communities for including lyrics in which he talked about rape and murder. The music video for "Yonkers", which featured Tyler eating a cockroach and committing suicide at the end, attracted controversy in the media, as well as being posted by Kanye West on his Twitter account, calling it "the video of 2011".

As the de facto leader of Odd Future during the early 2010s, the group quickly gained notable attention from the media and the Internet, comparing them to the Wu-Tang Clan for their rebellious attitude and refusal to fall within industry standards. However, Tyler quickly denied these comparisons: "we are in a completely different thing". The group's "DIY" approach made a strong impact on hip-hop, releasing music and content whenever they wanted through unconventional platforms such as YouTube, Tumblr or Myspace, influencing artists to take an alternative path in building their careers. The group and Tyler also influenced fashion, beginning to popularize urban clothing under the streetwear Supreme and Converse brands, in addition to their own brand "Golf Wang" with its striking colorful aesthetic. Tyler also brought a new wave of attention to skateboarding and biking as he was constantly seen riding a BMX or skateboard around Los Angeles. Several members of the group, such as Frank Ocean and Earl Sweatshirt, would go on to have successful musical careers, while alternative groups such as The Internet, led by Syd and Steve Lacy, would spawn.

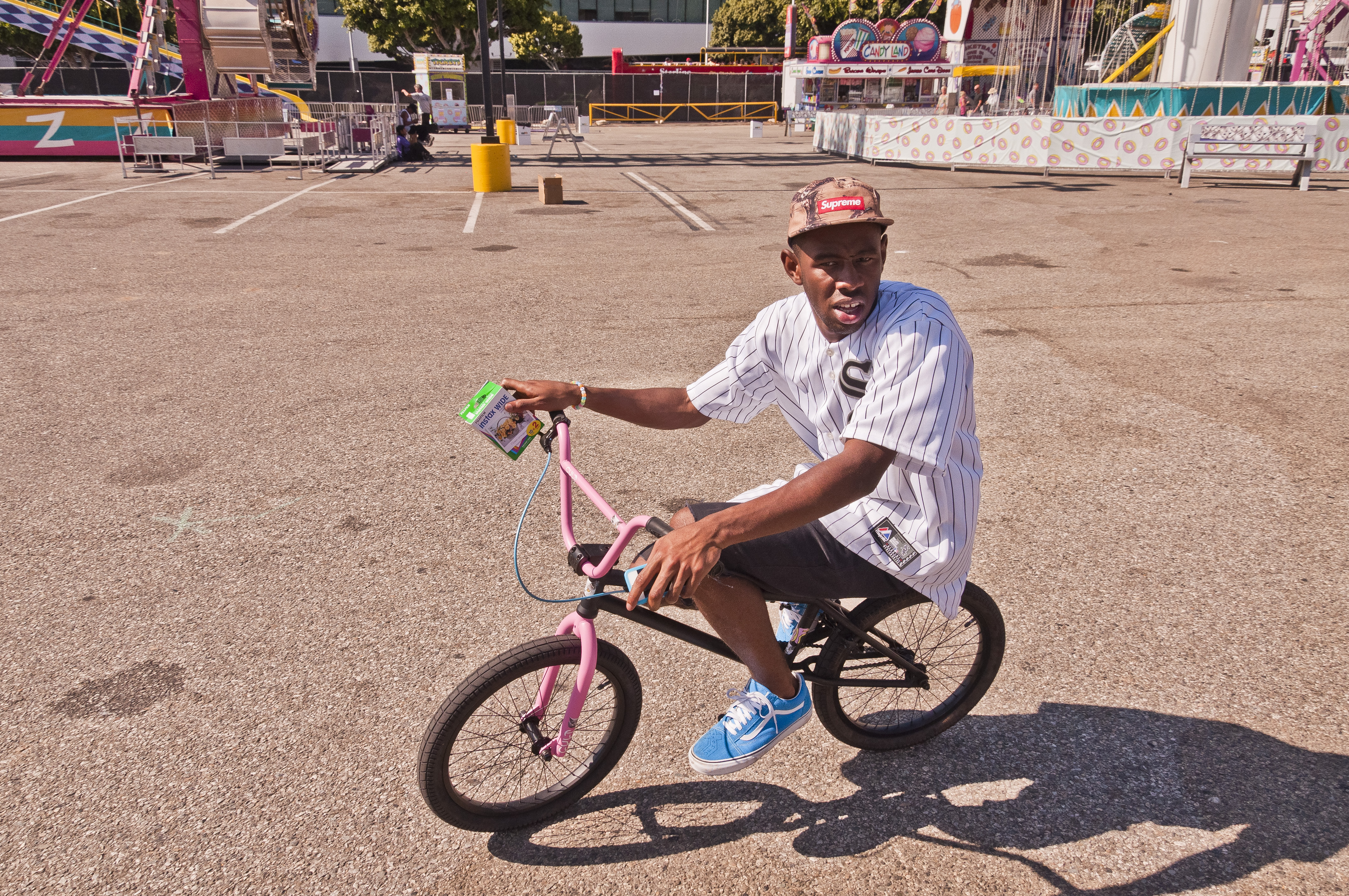
Tyler in September 2012

From the release of his third studio album Wolf, critics noticed a musical change in Tyler's productions, venturing into more accessible and melodic sounds through fusions of jazz, R&B and soul, including collaborations with artists from those genres such as Erykah Badu, Charlie Wilson, and Frank Ocean. He also took a more intimate approach in his lyrics, talking about his father's abandonment in the song "Answer". However, his next release, Cherry Bomb, had a mixed reception from fans and critics for its experimental production, in which Tyler decided to "create only songs" without any connection between them, with a more "aggressive" and "noisy" aesthetic. The Medium would write in an analysis that "[Cherry Bomb] is the album that signaled this change and would pave the way for his follow-up's Flower Boy and Igor to build upon, in terms of Tyler's style of production and lyricism." Around this time, Tyler would indefinitely step away from his responsibilities with Odd Future, signing with the record label Columbia Records.

Tyler's fifth album, Flower Boy, "marked the beginning of a new era — a complete departure from the wildly offensive lyrics and dark themes that defined his previous works". Igor, Tyler's first Grammy-winning album, was a deeply personal concept album about "the emotional journey of being the odd man out in a love triangle", while Call Me If You Get Lost, his second Grammy-winning album, was a concept album about "the persona of "Tyler Baudelaire", a suave, well-traveled gentleman with a sophisticated taste for high art". This latest trilogy established Tyler as one of the most acclaimed and highest-rated artists of his generation and decade. During his acceptance of the Cultural Influence Award at the BET Awards, Tyler thanked Q-Tip, André 3000, Chad Hugo, Kanye West, Missy Elliott, Busta Rhymes, and Hype Williams as his influences. In addition to music, Tyler also established himself in the fashion industry with Golf Le Fleur, a high-end luxury line described to "embody the globe-trotting mise en scène of his 2021 album Call Me If You Get Lost".

== Personal life ==
Okonma has been a skateboarder since 2002 and collects BMX bicycles. He is an atheist. Okonma has asthma, and has been seen using an inhaler while on stage. For this reason, he follows a straight edge lifestyle.

=== Sexuality ===
Okonma has been the subject of speculation regarding his sexuality and has made numerous direct references in lyrics and interviews to having had same-sex relationships or experiencing same-sex attractions. He described himself in a 2015 Rolling Stone interview as "gay as fuck" and said "My friends are so used to me being gay. They don't even care." In 2017, during an interview with Noisey, Okonma said that by age 15 he already had a boyfriend. In a 2018 interview with Fantastic Man, while discussing the Flower Boy lyric "I been kissing white boys since 2004" and the public response to it, Okonma said "It's still such a grey area with people, which is cool with me. Even though I'm considered loud and out there, I'm private, which is a weird dichotomy." Igor follows what many interpreted to be a romantic relationship between Okonma and a closeted bisexual man, while the song "Wilshire" on Call Me If You Get Lost has the lyric "I could fuck a trillion bitches every country I done been in / Men or women, it don't matter, if I seen 'em, then I had 'em". The song "Sorry Not Sorry" from the deluxe version of the album includes the lyric "Sorry to the guys I had to hide/Sorry to the girls I had to lie to", referring to his hiding male lovers from the public.

Okonma has been criticized for his use of homophobic slurs, particularly his frequent use of the epithet "faggot" in his lyrics and on Twitter. He has denied accusations of homophobia, stating, "I'm not homophobic. I just say faggot and use gay as an adjective to describe stupid shit," and, "I'm not homophobic. I just think faggot hits and hurts people." However, he later said in an interview with MTV, "Well, I have gay fans and they don't really take it offensive, so I don't know. If it offends you, it offends you. If you call me a nigger, I really don't care, but that's just me, personally. Some people might take it the other way; I personally don't give a shit." Okonma supported fellow Odd Future member Frank Ocean after Ocean publicly revealed a past relationship with another man. Lyrics on the album Flower Boy led to speculation that Okonma was coming out as gay; the tracks in question were "Foreword", "Garden Shed", and "I Ain't Got Time!"

=== Legal issues ===
Okonma was arrested on suspicion of vandalism in 2011 after allegedly destroying equipment during a show at The Roxy Theatre in West Hollywood. A fan recorded video depicted Okonma throwing a microphone at a sound engineer. Okonma subsequently paid $8,000 in damages to The Roxy.

In 2014, Okonma was arrested in Austin, Texas, for inciting a riot after telling fans to push past security guards at his South by Southwest performance. Okonma faced up to one year in prison and a $4,000 fine. Okonma's lawyer, Perry Minton, argued that the riot charge was overblown and perpetuated misconceptions of his client, who had no criminal record. The charges were later dropped.

Okonma revealed in 2015 that he had been banned from visiting the United Kingdom for three to five years, which forced him to cancel tour dates supporting the Cherry Bomb album, including the Reading and Leeds Festivals. His manager Christian Clancy said they were informed of the ban via a letter from then-Home Secretary Theresa May. May cited lyrics from the 2009 album Bastard as the reason for the ban, although Okonma had toured multiple times in the UK since its release. Okonma later said that he felt he had been treated like a terrorist and implied that the ban was racially motivated, stating that "they did not like the fact that their children were idolizing a black man." It is believed the ban was lifted in February 2019, concurring with a scheduled performance in London to promote Igor. However, the 2019 show was forcibly cancelled by police due to safety concerns that the venue was "overcrowded" and "too rowdy." After winning International Male Solo Artist at the 2020 Brit Awards, Okonma referenced the ban. "I wanna give a special shout out to someone who I hold dear to my heart, who made it where I couldn't come to this country five years ago," he said. "I know she's at home pissed off. Thank you, Theresa May."

=== Controversy ===
From 2010 to 2011, Okonma made a series of sexually explicit comments directed towards Selena Gomez over Twitter. In a 2013 interview, he stated that he and Selena were not on good terms, explaining, "We don't really get along. She don't like me. We don't like each other. Because I'm kicking it with Justin — like that's my homeboy. She always be mean muggin' me. Like why are you hating on me?" In 2021, Okonma made the public apology in his song "Manifesto" in his studio album Call Me If You Get Lost. Tyler Aquilina of Entertainment Weekly wrote of the controversy, "Tyler was known as a provocateur at that point in his career, and was frequently criticized for what many observers called homophobic and misogynistic lyrics, including depictions of violence against women".

In October 2025, when Okonma made a tribute towards American singer D'Angelo shortly after his death on X, he criticized his white fans for disrespecting the singer's death. Social media users made arguments against Okonma, claiming he had cultivated an anti-black white fanbase early in his career and that Okonma hated himself and his own Blackness. Controversial tweets resurfaced among the drama. Amidst the Ferguson riots, Okonma tweeted "AND BLACK PEOPLE ARE CURRENTLY MAD RIGHT NOW BUT IN 2 WEEKS WILL BE OVER IT CAUSE THEY REALLY DON'T CARE, COOL HASTHAG THO RIGHT?" and had also criticized affirmative action, tweeting "Hahahahaha, Some Black Chick Works Here. Affirmative Nigga."

=== Feuds ===
==== Eminem ====
Eminem, in his 2018 single "Fall", referred to Okonma as a "faggot" and implied that he explored sexuality in his music for attention. Eminem also attacked Okonma for being critical of his single "Walk on Water" and Shady XV (2014). After receiving backlash for his lyrics, Eminem responded in an interview with Sway, saying, "I think the word that I called him was one of the things where I felt like this might be too far. In my quest to hurt him, I realized I was hurting a lot of other people. It was one of the things that I kept going back to. Not feeling right with this." In an interview with The Guardian, Okonma responded, saying, "[The "Fall" line] was okay. Did you ever hear me publicly say anything about that? I knew what the intent was. He felt pressured because people got offended for me. We were playing Grand Theft Auto when we heard it. We rewound it and [shrugged]. Then kept playing."

==== DJ Khaled ====
In June 2019, after Igor debuted at number 1 on the Billboard 200 over DJ Khaled's album Father of Asahd, DJ Khaled posted a video on Instagram, criticizing Okonma's music saying, "I make albums so people can play it and you actually hear it. [If] driving your car, you hear another car playing it, go to the barbershop, you hear them playing it [and] turn the radio on, and you hear them playing it. It's called great music. It's called albums [where] you actually hear the songs. Not no mysterious shit you never hear the songs". He then deleted the video.

On August 6, 2021, Okonma spoke about the DJ Khaled controversy on Hot 97, stating that he enjoyed "just watching a man die inside because the weirdo is winning". He claimed that DJ Khaled "had to deal with that because his whole identity is being number one and when he didn't get that, that sat with him longer in real life time than that moment. I moved on." Okonma made multiple references to "mysterious music" on Twitter, writing "MYSTERIOUS MUSIC! HA!" after winning Best Rap Album at the 2022 Grammy Awards for Call Me If You Get Lost.

Rolling Stone reported in a November 7, 2023 feature story about DJ Khaled that he had expressed interest in collaborating with Tyler, the Creator, and that he asserted they now have a good rapport.

== Discography ==
Studio albums

- Bastard (2009)
- Goblin (2011)
- Wolf (2013)
- Cherry Bomb (2015)
- Flower Boy (2017)
- Igor (2019)
- Call Me If You Get Lost (2021)
- Chromakopia (2024)
- Don't Tap the Glass (2025)

== Tours ==
=== Headlining ===
- Wolf Tour (2013)
- 2014 Tour (2014)
- Cherry Bomb Tour (2015)
- Okaga, CA Tour (2016)
- Flower Boy Tour (2017–2018)
- Igor Tour (2019)
- Call Me If You Get Lost Tour (2022)
- Chromakopia: The World Tour (2025–2026)

=== Co-headlining ===
- Rocky and Tyler Tour (with A$AP Rocky) (2015)

=== Supporting ===
- Kid Cudi – Cud Life Tour (2013)

== Filmography ==
=== Television ===
Year	Title	Role	Notes
2011–2013	Late Night with Jimmy Fallon	Himself	2011: Performed "Sandwitches" with Hodgy Beats; 2013: Performed "Treehome95" with Coco O and "Domo23"
2011	When I Was 17	Himself	
2011	Workaholics	Extra	Episode: "Heist School"
2011	Regular Show	Blitz Comet; Big Trouble	Voice roles (Episode: "Rap It Up")
2012	Punk'd	Himself	2 episodes; Season 9, Episodes 2 and 4
2012	Ridiculousness	Himself	Season 2, Episode 10: Tyler, the Creator, and Taco Bennett
2012	The Mindy Project	Rapper	Season 1, Episode 10: Mindy's Brother
2012–2014	Loiter Squad	Himself	Co-creator, producer, composer
2013	Late Show with David Letterman	Himself	Performed "Rusty" with Domo Genesis and Earl Sweatshirt
2013	The Arsenio Hall Show	Himself	
2013	Axe Cop	Liborg	2 episodes
2015	Black Dynamite	Broto	Season 2, episode 10: "The Wizard of Watts"
2015	The Eric André Show	Himself	Season 3, episode 8: "Jimmy Kimmel; Tyler, The Creator"
2015	Tavis Smiley	Himself	
2015, 2017–2019	The Jellies!	Various	Creator, Executive Producer, composer
2017	The Late Show with Stephen Colbert	Himself	Performed "911"
2017	Uncle Grandpa	Construction Manager	Season 5, episode 3: "Uncle Grandpa's Odd-yssey"
2020	Kidding	Cornell	Season 2
2022	Big Mouth	Jesus Christ	Season 6, episode 1: The Hookup House

=== Films ===
Year	Title	Role	Notes
2022	Jackass Forever	Himself	Guest appearance
2022	Jackass 4.5	Himself	Cameo
2024	Piece by Piece	Mr. Thoroughgood	Cameo; voice role
2025	Marty Supreme	Wally	Credited as Tyler Okonma
TBA	The Adventures of Drunky	Oscar	Voice role

=== Video Games ===
Year	Title	Role	Notes
2013	Grand Theft Auto V	Additional voices	Credited under The Local Population Credited as Tyler Mr. Hot Sauce Haley Wolf 2010

=== As director ===
==== Music videos ====
Year	Song	Artist	Notes
2010	"Bastard"	Tyler, the Creator	Credited as Wolf Haley; Co-directed by Taco Bennett
2010	"French!" (featuring Hodgy Beats)	Tyler, the Creator	Credited as Wolf Haley; Co-directed by Taco Bennett
2010	"VCR"	Tyler, the Creator	Credited as Wolf Haley; Co-directed by Taco Bennett
2011	"Yonkers"	Tyler, the Creator	Credited as Wolf Haley
2011	"She" (featuring Frank Ocean)	Tyler, the Creator	Credited as Wolf Haley
2011	"Bitch Suck Dick" (featuring Jasper Dolphin & Taco)	Tyler, the Creator	Credited as Wolf Haley
2012	"Rella" (featuring Hodgy Beats, Domo Genesis and Tyler, the Creator)	Odd Future	Credited as Wolf Haley
2012	"NY (Ned Flander)" (featuring Hodgy Beats & Tyler, the Creator)	Odd Future	Credited as Wolf Haley
2012	"Sam (Is Dead)" (featuring Domo Genesis and Tyler, the Creator)	Odd Future	Credited as Wolf Haley
2012	"F.E.B.N."	Trash Talk	Credited as Wolf Haley
2013	"Domo 23/Bimmer"	Tyler, the Creator	Credited as Wolf Haley
2013	"Whoa" (featuring Tyler, the Creator)	Earl Sweatshirt	Credited as Wolf Haley
2013	"IFHY/Jamba" (featuring Pharrell and Hodgy Beats)	Tyler, the Creator	Credited as Wolf Haley
2013	"Tamale/Answer"	Tyler, the Creator	Credited as Wolf Haley
2013	"Glowing"	D.A. Wallach	Credited as Wolf Haley
2015	"Fucking Young/Deathcamp"	Tyler, the Creator	Credited as Wolf Haley
2016	"Buffalo/Find Your Wings" (featuring Shane Powers, Roy Ayers, Syd, and Kali Uchis)	Tyler, the Creator	Credited as Wolf Haley
2016	"Perfect" (featuring Kali Uchis and Austin Feinstein)	Tyler, the Creator	Credited as Wolf Haley
2017	"Who Dat Boy/911" (featuring A$AP Rocky)	Tyler, the Creator	Credited as Wolf Haley
2018	"Okra"	Tyler, the Creator	Credited as Wolf Haley
2018	"Potato Salad" (featuring A$AP Rocky)	Tyler, the Creator	Credited as Wolf Haley
2018	"See You Again / Where This Flower Blooms" (featuring Kali Uchis and Frank Ocean)	Tyler, the Creator	Credited as Wolf Haley
2019	"Earfquake"	Tyler, the Creator	Credited as Wolf Haley
2019	"A Boy Is a Gun"	Tyler, the Creator	Credited as Wolf Haley
2019	"I Think"	Tyler, the Creator	Credited as Wolf Haley
2019	"Best Interest"	Tyler, the Creator	Credited as Wolf Haley
2021	"Lumberjack"	Tyler, the Creator	Credited as Wolf Haley
2021	"WusYaName" (featuring Youngboy Never Broke Again and Ty Dolla Sign)	Tyler, the Creator	Credited as Wolf Haley
2021	"Juggernaut" (featuring Lil Uzi Vert and Pharrell Williams)	Tyler, the Creator	Credited as Wolf Haley
2021	"Corso"	Tyler, the Creator	Credited as Wolf Haley
2021	"Lemonhead" (featuring 42 Dugg and Frank Ocean)	Tyler, the Creator	
2022	"Come On, Let's Go" (featuring Nigo)	Tyler, the Creator	Credited as Tyler Okonma
2024	"Noid"	Tyler, the Creator	Credited as Tyler Okonma
2024	"Thought I Was Dead" (featuring Schoolboy Q and Santigold)	Tyler, the Creator	Credited as Tyler Okonma
2025	"Sticky" (featuring GloRilla, Sexyy Red, and Lil Wayne)	Tyler, the Creator	Credited as Tyler Okonma
2025	"Stop Playing With Me"	Tyler, the Creator	Credited as Tyler Okonma
2025	"Sugar on My Tongue"	Tyler, the Creator	Credited as Tyler Okonma
2025	"Darling I"	Tyler, the Creator	
