= Lumberjack (song) =

2021 single by Tyler, the Creator

Single by Tyler, the Creator

from the album Call Me If You Get Lost
- Released: June 16, 2021
- Genre: Boom bap
- Length: 2:18
- Label: Columbia
- Songwriters: Larry Willis; Robert Diggs; Anthony Ian Berkeley; Arnold Hamilton; Paul Huston; Tyler Okonma
- Producer: Tyler, the Creator

Tyler, the Creator singles chronology
"Tell Me How" (2021)	"Lumberjack" (2021)	"WusYaName" (2021)

Music video
- "Lumberjack" on YouTube

"Lumberjack" (stylized in all caps) is a song by American rapper and producer Tyler, the Creator, released on June 16, 2021, as the lead single from his seventh studio album, Call Me If You Get Lost. The song samples the Gravediggaz track "2 Cups of Blood".

== Background ==
In June 2021, various billboards would appear in locations around Los Angeles with the phrase "Call Me if You Get Lost" written on them, as well as a phone number, which upon being called, plays a voicemail of a conversation between Tyler and his mother. A week later, Tyler released a short clip titled "Side Street" to social media, which was followed by the release of "Lumberjack", alongside its self-directed music video, two days later on June 16.

== Music video ==
The music video, directed by Tyler (who is credited as his alter ego Wolf Haley), was released along with the single on June 16. The video opens with Tyler lounging in his bed reading a magazine eating a blueberry donut. He then receives a phone call which makes him spring out of bed and begin rapping. The video cuts to scenes of him getting a manicure while laughing with his nail technician and him wearing face prosthetics in a tuxedo. The closing scene is of Tyler rapping in the middle of a blizzard, ending with the Call Me If You Get Lost jingle.

== Personnel ==
Credits adapted from Tidal.

- Tyler Okonma – producer, composer, lyricist, associated performer, recording engineer (song's main author)
- Anthony Ian Berkeley – composer, lyricist (co-author of "2 Cups of Blood" sample used in the song)
- Arnold Hamilton – composer, lyricist (co-author of "2 Cups of Blood" sample used in the song)
- Larry Willis – composer, lyricist (co-author of "2 Cups of Blood" sample used in the song)
- Paul Huston – composer, lyricist (co-author of "2 Cups of Blood" sample used in the song)
- Robert Diggs – composer, lyricist (co-author of "2 Cups of Blood" sample used in the song)
- Ben Fletcher – assistant engineer
- Zachary Acosta – assistant engineer
- Domo Genesis – background vocal
- Lionel Boyce – background vocal
- Travis Bennett – background vocal
- Mike Bozzi – mastering engineer
- NealHPogue – mixing engineer
- Vic Wainstein – recording engineer

== Charts ==
Chart performance for "Lumberjack"
Chart (2021)	Peak position
Australia (ARIA)	40
Canada Hot 100 (Billboard)	38
Global 200 (Billboard)	40
Ireland (IRMA)	75
Lithuania (AGATA)	32
New Zealand (Recorded Music NZ)	40
Portugal (AFP)	68
UK Singles (Official Charts)	48
UK Hip Hop/R&B (Official Charts)	16
US Billboard Hot 100	45
US Hot R&B/Hip-Hop Songs (Billboard)	17
US Rolling Stone Top 100	11

== Certifications ==
Certifications for "Lumberjack"
Region	Certification	Certified units/sales
United States (RIAA)	Gold	500,000^{‡}
^{‡} Sales+streaming figures based on certification alone.
