= Best Interest (song) =

2020 single by Tyler, the Creator

Single by Tyler, the Creator
- Released: January 25, 2020
- Genre: Neo-soul
- Length: 2:07
- Label: Columbia
- Songwriters: Tyler Okonma; Kenneth Chavis; Barbara Trotter
- Producer: Tyler, the Creator

Tyler, the Creator singles chronology
"Castaway" (2019)	"Best Interest" / "Group B" (2020)	"Automatic Driver (Tyler, The Creator Remix)" (2020)

Music video
- "Best Interest" on YouTube

"Best Interest" is a song by American rapper Tyler, the Creator. It was first released on December 23, 2019 as a music video, before being released to streaming services on January 25, 2020. The song contains a sample of "Bless You With My Love" by Heaven Sent & Ecstasy.

== Background ==
On December 23, 2019, Tyler, the Creator released the music video of "Best Interest" alongside his song "Group B" via YouTube. According to him, "Best Interest" was an unfinished track that he originally recorded for his album Igor. "Best Interest" and "Group B" were both released to streaming services on January 25, 2020.

== Composition ==
The song uses a soulful groove and sample, with production consisting of horns, strings, xylophone and piano with occasional synthesizers and "loosely jazz drumming". It has been described as having 1950's and 1960's "soul-esque sounds that characterized the majority of Igor". In regard to his performance, Tyler, the Creator croons in a high-pitched tone before transitioning to rapping in monotone, raspy vocals halfway through the song. Lyrically, he reflects on a secret relationship and its troubles.

== Critical reception ==
Bianca Gracie of Billboard commented "the soulful piano-laden melodies of 'Best Interest' would've fit in perfectly with Igor's captivating and romantic themes." Noah C. of HotNewHipHop wrote of the song, "While the song may not be mixed and mastered, it sounds complete."

== Music video ==
The music video was filmed by Wyatt Navarro. It sees Tyler, the Creator cruising through a marsh and swamp with friends in a boat on a sunny day. Tyler revealed on Twitter that the video was shot without preparation: "was on a boat, told the homie to just start filming, I was lip syncing to no music, was surprised when it synced up perfectly".

== Charts ==
Chart (2020)	Peak position
New Zealand Hot Singles (RMNZ)	35

== Certifications ==
Region	Certification	Certified units/sales
Canada (Music Canada)	Gold	40,000^{‡}
Mexico (AMPROFON)	Platinum+Gold	90,000^{‡}
New Zealand (RMNZ)	2× Platinum	60,000^{‡}
Poland (ZPAV)	Gold	25,000^{‡}
United Kingdom (BPI)	Gold	400,000^{‡}
United States (RIAA)	2× Platinum	2,000,000^{‡}
^{‡} Sales+streaming figures based on certification alone.
