= Tyler, the Creator production discography =

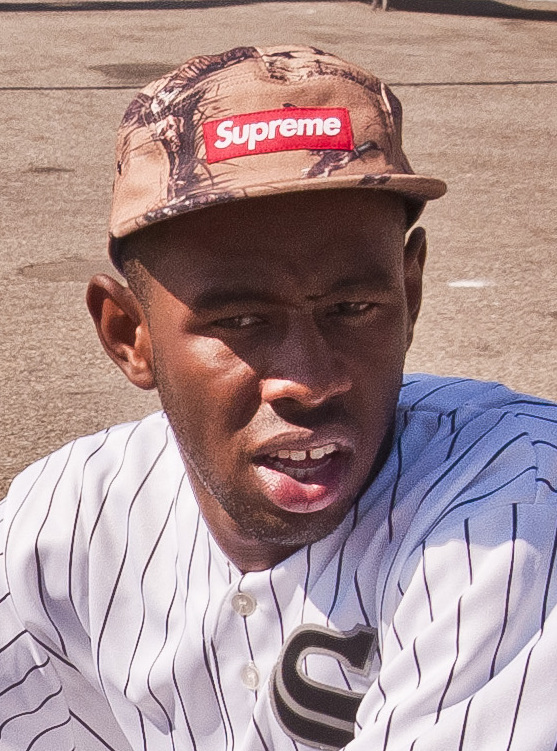
Tyler, the Creator in 2012

The following list is a discography of production by Tyler, the Creator, an American rapper and producer. Unreleased projects are not included.

== 2007 ==
=== Casey Veggies - Customized Greatly Vol. 1 ===
- 07. "Odd"
- 10. "I Don't Know (Skit)"

== 2008 ==
=== I Smell Panties - I Smell Panties EP ===
- 01. "Bapes"
- 02. "Bapes (Freestyle)"
- 03. "Bring in the Hi Hat"
- 04. "Hi to Me"
- 05. "Lilo Fucks Stitch"
- 06. "Lisa" (featuring Casey Veggies and Left Brain)

=== Brandun DeShay - Volume: One! For the Money ===
- 07. "Odd Future Freestyle"
- 15. "Orange Gum Drops"

=== Odd Future - The Odd Future Tape ===
- 01. "The Tape Intro" (performed by Tyler, The Creator)
- 02. "Odd Toddlers" (performed by Tyler, The Creator and Casey Veggies)
- 04. "Back for Another One" (performed by Casey Veggies and Tyler, The Creator)
- 06. "Fucking Lame" (performed by Tyler, The Creator)
- 08. "Bitches Brewing" (performed by Tyler, The Creator)
- 11. "The Life Like" (performed by Casey Veggies)
- 13. "Slow It Down" (performed Tyler, The Creator and Hodgy Beats)
- 14. "Remember Me" (performed by Tyler, The Creator and Casey Veggies)
- 16. "Lisa" (performed by I Smell Panties, Casey Veggies and MellowHype)
- 17. "Fin" (performed by Tyler, The Creator)
- 18. "Commercial" (performed by Tyler, The Creator and Casey Veggies)
- 19. "Dracula" (performed by Tyler, The Creator)

== 2009 ==
=== Brandun DeShay - Volume: Two! For the Show ===
- 05. "More Ovaltine Please"
- 17. "What's So Fxcking Funny?" (performed by Brandun Deshay and Tyler, The Creator)

=== Hodgy Beats - The Dena Tape ===
- 01. "Tapetro"
- 05. "Biscuits"
- 07. "Customized Greatly"
- 16. "April Fools"
- 22. "Sorry"

=== Casey Veggies - Customized Greatly Vol. 2 ===
- 09. "Networking"
- 17. "Finally Something Different"

=== Tyler, The Creator - Bastard ===
- 01. "Bastard"
- 02. "Seven"
- 03. "Odd Toddlers" (featuring Casey Veggies)
  - Sample credit: Cortex - "Huit Octobre 1971"
- 04. "French!" (featuring Hodgy Beats)
- 05. "Blow"
- 06. "Pigs Fly" (featuring Domo Genesis)
- 07. "Parade"
- 08. "Slow It Down" (featuring Hodgy Beats)
- 09. "AssMilk" (featuring Earl Sweatshirt)
- 10. "VCR/Wheels"
- 11. "Session" (featuring Hodgy Beats, Mike G and Brandun DeShay)
- 12. "Sarah"
- 13. "Jack and the Beanstalk"
  - Sample credit: Jay-Z - "What More Can I Say"
- 14. "Tina" (featuring Jasper Dolphin and Taco)
- 15. "Inglorious"

== 2010 ==
=== Earl Sweatshirt - Earl ===
- 01. "Thisniggaugly"
- 02. "Earl"
- 03. "Couch" (featuring Tyler, The Creator)
- 04. "Kill"
- 05. "Wakeupfaggot"
- 06. "Luper"
- 08. "Moonlight" (featuring Hodgy Beats)
- 09. "Pigions" (featuring Tyler, The Creator)

=== Mike G - Ali ===
- 01. "OkMikeG"

=== Domo Genesis - Rolling Papers ===
- 01. "First Roll"
- 02. "Buzzin"
- 04. "Rolling Papers" (featuring Tyler, The Creator)
- 05. "Dreams" (produced with Syd tha Kyd)
- 06. "Cap n Crunch"
- 07. "Steam Roller" (featuring Hodgy Beats)
- 08. "Kickin It"
- 10. "Drunk" (featuring Mike G)
- 11. "Clear Eyes"
- 13. "Last Roll"

=== Casey Veggies - Sleeping in Class ===
- 10. "DTA" (featuring Tyler, The Creator)

=== Earl Sweatshirt, Tyler, The Creator and Hodgy Beats - ===
- "Fuck This Christmas"

=== The Jet Age of Tomorrow - Journey to the 5th Echelon ===
- 11. "Betty's Room"

== 2011 ==
=== Tyler, The Creator - Goblin ===
- 01. "Goblin"
- 02. "Yonkers"
- 03. "Radicals"
- 04. "She" (featuring Frank Ocean)
- 06. "Nightmare"
- 07. "Tron Cat"
- 08. "Her"
- 09. "Sandwitches" (featuring Hodgy Beats)
- 10. "Fish"
- 11. "Analog" (featuring Hodgy Beats)
- 12. "Bitch Suck Dick" (featuring Jasper Dolphin and Taco)
- 13. "Window" (featuring Domo Genesis, Frank Ocean, Hodgy Beats and Mike G)
- 14. "Au79"
- 15. "Golden"

Bonus Tracks:

- 16. "Burger" (featuring Hodgy Beats)
- 17. "Untitled 63"
- 18. "Steak Sauce"

=== MellowHype - BlackenedWhite ===
- 12. "Game" (featuring Tyler, The Creator)

=== Pusha T ===
- "Ooh" (featuring Hodgy Beats, Liva Don and Tyler, The Creator)

== 2012 ==
=== The Internet - Purple Naked Ladies Bonus Songs EP ===
- 02. "Live It Up"

=== Jack Mushroom - One Up ===
- 02. "Brotherly Love" (featuring Skoolie 300)
- 04. "Cloud High"

=== Odd Future - The OF Tape Vol. 2 ===
- 01. "Hi."
- 03. "NY (Ned Flander)" (performed by Hodgy Beats and Tyler, The Creator)
- 07. "Analog 2" (performed by Tyler, The Creator, Frank Ocean and Syd)
- 12. "P" (performed by Hodgy Beats and Tyler, The Creator)
- 13. "White" (performed by Frank Ocean) (produced with Frank Ocean)
- 15. "Sam (Is Dead)" (performed by Domo Genesis and Tyler, The Creator)
- 16. "Doms" (performed by Domo Genesis)
- 17. "We Got Bitches" (performed by Tyler, The Creator, Taco and Jasper Dolphin)
- 18. "Oldie"

=== Casey Veggies - Customized Greatly Vol. 3 ===
- 10. "PNCINTLOFWGKTA" (featuring Tyler, The Creator, Domo Genesis, Hodgy Beats and Earl Sweatshirt)

=== Frank Ocean - Channel Orange ===
- 12. "White" (featuring John Mayer) [produced with Frank Ocean]
- 17. “End / Golden Girl” (featuring Tyler the Creator)

=== MellowHype - Numbers ===
- 11. "666" (featuring Mike G) [produced with Left Brain]

== 2013 ==
=== Tyler, The Creator - Wolf ===
- 01. "Wolf"
- 02. "Jamba" (featuring Hodgy Beats)
- 03. "Cowboy"
- 04. "Awkward"
- 05. "Domo23"
- 06. "Answer"
- 07. "Slater" (featuring Frank Ocean)
- 08. "48"
- 09. "Colossus"
- 10. "PartyIsntOver/Campfire/Bimmer" (featuring Lætitia Sadier and Frank Ocean)
- 11. "IFHY" (featuring Pharrell Williams)
- 12. "Pigs"
- 13. "Parking Lot" (featuring Casey Veggies and Mike G)
- 14. "Rusty" (featuring Domo Genesis and Earl Sweatshirt)
- 15. "Trashwang" (featuring Na'kel, Jasper, Lucas, L-Boy, Taco, Left Brain and Lee Spielman)
- 16. "Treehome95" (featuring Coco O. and Erykah Badu)
- 17. "Tamale"
- 18. "Lone"

=== The Music of Grand Theft Auto V, Vol. 1: Original Music ===
- 10. "Garbage"

=== Mac Miller - Watching Movies with the Sound Off ===
- 18. "O.K." (featuring Tyler, The Creator)

=== Earl Sweatshirt - Doris ===
- 07. "Sasquatch" (featuring Tyler, The Creator)
- 13. "Whoa" (featuring Tyler, The Creator)

== 2014 ==
=== Schoolboy Q - Oxymoron ===
- 08. "The Purge" (featuring Tyler, The Creator and Kurupt)

== 2015 ==
=== Mike G - Award Tour II ===
- 04. "Highlights"

=== Kali Uchis - Por Vida ===
- 02. "Call Me"
- 08. "Speed"

=== Tyler, The Creator - Cherry Bomb ===
- 01. "Deathcamp" (featuring Cole Alexander) [produced with Mike Einziger]
- 02. "Buffalo" (featuring Shane Powers)
- 03. "Pilot" (featuring Syd Bennett)
- 04. "Run" (featuring Chaz Bundick and Schoolboy Q)
- 05. "Find Your Wings" (featuring Roy Ayers, Syd Bennett and Kali Uchis)
- 06. "Cherry Bomb"
- 07. "Blow My Load" (featuring Wanya Morris, Dâm-Funk, Austin Feinstein and Syd Bennett)
- 08. "2Seater" (featuring Aaron Shaw, Samantha Nelson and Austin Feinstein) [produced with Mike Einziger]
- 09. "The Brown Stains of Darkeese Latifah Part 6–12 (Remix)" (featuring Schoolboy Q)
- 10. "Fucking Young / Perfect" (featuring Charlie Wilson, Chaz Bundick, Syd Bennett and Kali Uchis)
- 11. "Smuckers" (featuring Kanye West and Lil Wayne)
- 12. "Keep Da O's" (featuring Pharrell Williams and Coco O.)
- 13. "Okaga, CA" (featuring Alice Smith, Leon Ware and Clem Creevy)

Bonus Track:

- 14. "Yellow"

=== The Internet - Ego Death ===
- 12. "Palace / Curse" (featuring Tyler, The Creator and Steve Lacy) [produced with Steve Lacy]

=== Mac Miller - GO:OD AM ===
- 01. "Doors"

=== Casey Veggies - Live & Grow ===
- 12. "RIP" (featuring Tyler, The Creator)

== 2016 ==
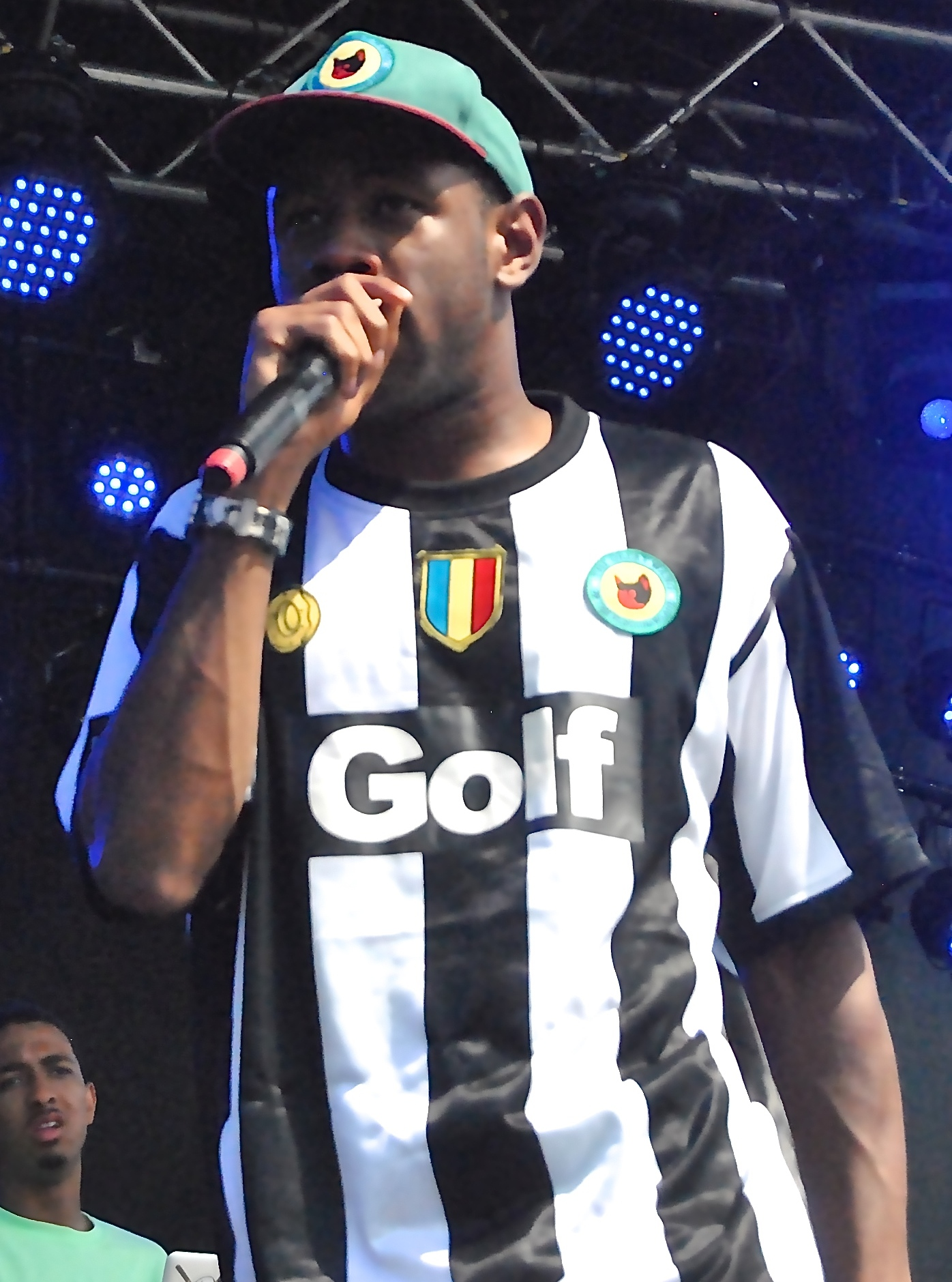
Tyler performing in 2016

=== Domo Genesis - Genesis ===
- 06. "Go (Gas)" (featuring Wiz Khalifa, Juicy J and Tyler, The Creator)

=== Schoolboy Q - Blank Face LP ===
- 11. "Big Body" (featuring Tha Dogg Pound)

=== Frank Ocean - Blonde ===
- 06. "Skyline To" (produced with Om'Mas Keith, Malay, and Frank Ocean)

== 2017 ==
=== Matt Martians - The Drum Chord Theory ===
- 09. "Dent Jusay" (featuring Syd and Steve Lacy)
- 10. "Callin' on Me" (produced with Matt Martians)

=== Tyler, The Creator - Flower Boy ===
- 01. "Foreword" (featuring Rex Orange County)
- 02. "Where This Flower Blooms" (featuring Frank Ocean)
- 03. "Sometimes..."
- 04. "See You Again" (featuring Kali Uchis)
- 05. "Who Dat Boy" (featuring ASAP Rocky)
- 06. "Pothole" (featuring Jaden Smith)
- 07. "Garden Shed" (featuring Estelle)
- 08. "Boredom" (featuring Rex Orange County and Anna of the North)
- 09. "I Ain't Got Time!"
- 10. "911 / Mr. Lonely" (featuring Frank Ocean and Steve Lacy)
- 11. "Droppin' Seeds" (featuring Lil Wayne)
- 12. "November"
- 13. "Glitter"
- 14. "Enjoy Right Now, Today"

== 2018 ==
=== Tyler, The Creator - Okra ===
- "Okra"

=== Tyler, The Creator - 435 ===
- "435"

=== Tyler, The Creator - Music Inspired by Illumination & Dr. Seuss' The Grinch ===
- 01. "Whoville"
- 02. "Lights On" (featuring Ryan Beatty and Santigold)
- 03. "Hot Chocolate" (featuring Jerry Paper)
- 04. "Big Bag"
- 05. "When Gloves Come Off" (featuring Ryan Beatty)
- 06. "Cindy Lou's Wish"

=== $ILKMONEY - I Hate My Life and I Really Wish People Would Stop Telling Me Not To ===
- 01. "Casket"
- 03. "My Forte"
- 05. "NAGA" (featuring Tyler, the Creator)
- 07. "Kitt-Katt" (featuring Tyler, the Creator)
- 08. "Why Lie (10 Million Ways to Die)"

== 2019 ==
=== Solange Knowles - When I Get Home ===
- 11. "My Skin My Logo" (produced with Solange Knowles, Jamire Williams, John Key, Steve Lacy and John Carroll Kirby)

=== Tyler, The Creator - Igor ===
- 01. "Igor's Theme"
- 02. "Earfquake"
- 03. "I Think"
- 04. "Exactly What You Run from You End Up Chasing"
- 05. "Running Out of Time"
- 06. "New Magic Wand"
- 07. "A Boy Is a Gun"
- 08. "Puppet"
- 09. "What's Good"
- 10. "Gone, Gone / Thank You"
- 11. "I Don't Love You Anymore"
- 12. "Are We Still Friends?"

Bonus track:

- 04. "Boyfriend"

=== Slow Hollows - Actors ===
- 03. "Heart" (featuring Ryan Beatty) [produced with Austin Anderson and Daniel Fox]

== 2020 ==
=== Westside Gunn - Pray for Paris ===
- 12. "Party wit Pop Smoke" (featuring Keisha Plum)

=== La Roux ===
- "Automatic Driver (Tyler, The Creator Remix)"

== 2021 ==
=== Tyler, the Creator - Call Me If You Get Lost ===
- 2. "Corso"
- 3. "Lemonhead" (featuring 42 Dugg)
- 4. "WusYaName" (featuring YoungBoy Never Broke Again and Ty Dolla Sign)
- 5. "Lumberjack"
- 6. "Hot Wind Blows" (featuring Lil Wayne)
- 7. "Massa"
- 8. "RunItUp" (featuring Teezo Touchdown)
- 9. "Manifesto" (featuring Domo Genesis)
- 10. "Sweet / I Thought You Wanted to Dance" (featuring Brent Faiyaz and Fana Hues)
- 11. "Momma Talk"
- 12. "Rise!" (featuring Daisy World) [produced with Jamie xx]
- 13. "Blessed"
- 14. "Juggernaut" (featuring Lil Uzi Vert and Pharrell Williams)
- 15. "Wilshire"
- 16. "Safari" [produced with Jay Versace]

Bonus track:

- 16. "Fishtail" [produced with Beat Butcha and Daringer]

=== Snoh Aalegra - "Temporary Highs in the Violet Skies" ===
- 5. “NEON PEACH” (featuring Tyler, The Creator)
- 10. “IN THE MOMENT” (featuring Tyler, The Creator)

=== Maxo Kream - Weight of the World ===
- 4. "Big Persona" (featuring Tyler, The Creator)

== 2022 ==
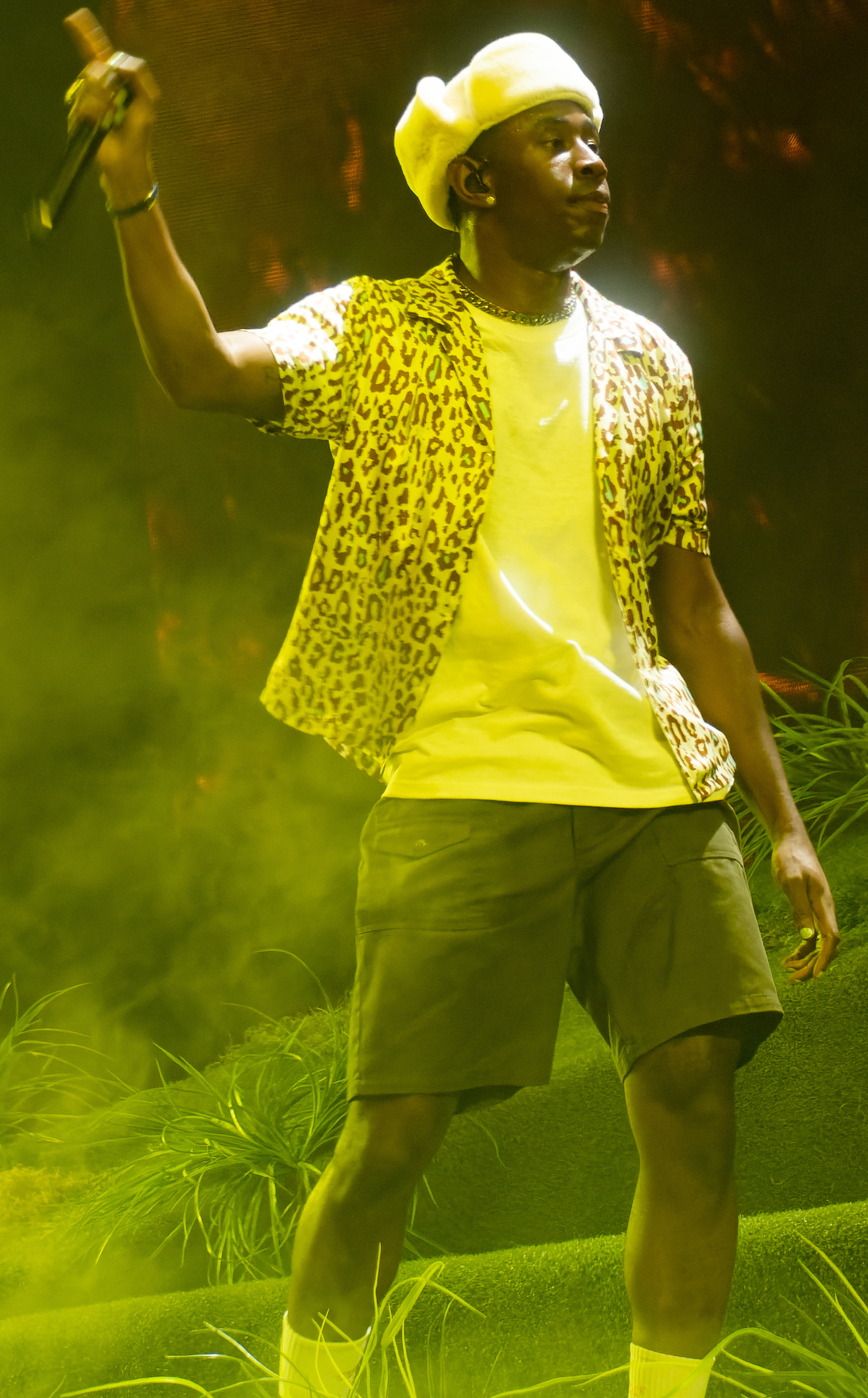
Tyler performing at Primavera Sound 2022

=== Rex Orange County - Who Cares ===
- 2. "OPEN A WINDOW" (featuring Tyler, The Creator) [produced with Benny Sings and Rex Orange County]

=== SZA - Ctrl (Deluxe edition) ===
- 21. "Jodie"

== 2023 ==
=== ASAP Rocky ===
- "Same Problems?" [produced with ASAP Rocky and Hector Delgado]

=== Tyler, the Creator - Call Me If You Get Lost: The Estate Sale ===
- 17. "Everything Must Go"
- 18. "Stuntman" (featuring Vince Staples)
- 20. "Wharf Talk" (featuring ASAP Rocky)
- 21. "Dogtooth"
- 23. "Boyfriend, Girlfriend (2020 Demo)" (featuring YG)
- 24. "Sorry Not Sorry"

== 2024 ==
=== Maxo Kream - Personification ===
- 03. "Cracc Era" (featuring Tyler, the Creator)

=== Tyler, the Creator - CHROMAKOPIA ===
- 01. "St. Chroma" (featuring Daniel Caesar)
- 02. "Rah Tah Tah"
- 03. "Noid"
- 04. "Darling, I" (featuring Teezo Touchdown)
- 05. "Hey Jane"
- 06. "I Killed You"
- 07. "Judge Judy"
- 08. "Sticky" (featuring GloRilla, Sexyy Red and Lil Wayne)
- 09. "Take Your Mask Off" (featuring Daniel Caesar and LaToiya Williams)
- 10. "Tomorrow"
- 11. "Thought I Was Dead" (featuring Schoolboy Q and Santigold)
- 12. "Like Him" (featuring Lola Young)
- 13. "Balloon" (featuring Doechii)
- 14. "I Hope You Find Your Way Home"

Bonus track:

- 11. "Mother"

== 2025 ==
=== Maxo Kream ===
- "Cracc at 15"

=== Tyler, the Creator - Don't Tap The Glass ===
- 1. "Big Poe"
- 2. "Sugar On My Tongue"
- 3. "Sucka Free"
- 4. "Mommanem"
- 5. "Stop Playing With Me"
- 6. "Ring Ring Ring"
- 7. "Don't Tap That Glass / Tweakin'"
- 8. "Don't You Worry Baby"
- 9. "I'll Take Care of You"
- 10. "Tell Me What It Is"

Bonus Track:

- 10. "Down Bad"

=== Tyler, the Creator - CHROMAKOPIA+ ===
- 12. "Mother"

== 2026 ==
=== AZ Chike — No Rest for the Wicked ===
- 6. "Look Like My Mama" (with Tyler, the Creator)
- 12. "The World Is Ours" (with Tyler, the Creator)
