= That Guy (song) =

2024 single by Tyler, the Creator

- Single cover artwork

Single by Tyler, the Creator
- Released: December 25, 2024 (YouTube); June 23, 2026 (streaming)
- Genre: West Coast hip-hop
- Length: 2:48.
- Label: Columbia
- Songwriters: Tyler Okonma; Jack Antonoff; Dijon McFarlane; Mark Anthony Spears; Barry Lewis Adams Jr.; Zarius Cunningham; Kendrick Lamar; Lefabian Williams
- Producers: Jack Antonoff; Mustard; Sounwave

Tyler, the Creator singles chronology
"Sticky" (2025)	"That Guy" (2024)	"Like Him" (2025)

Music video
- "That Guy" on YouTube

"That Guy" is a remix of Kendrick Lamar's "Hey Now" (2024) by American rapper Tyler, the Creator. It was surprise released exclusively on YouTube on December 25, 2024. The song was later released to streaming platforms on June 23, 2026. A West Coast hip-hop track, the freestyle track revolves around Tyler, the Creator's flexing based on his wealth and success of his album Chromakopia, and references being at Lamar's Pop Out concert, places from the Southwestern Los Angeles area, and his sexual orientation.

The song's music video features Tyler, the Creator rapping the lyrics while dancing in various locations in Hawthorne, California and showing off his Ferrari and designer clothing. Odd Future members Travis "Taco" Bennett, Jasper Dolphin, and Lionel "L-Boy" Boyce make cameos in the ending.

"That Guy" received positive reviews from music critics for Tyler, the Creator's lyrical ability, "douchebag energy", and reinterpretation of "Hey Now", while it received a divisive response from his fanbase. Commercially, after its 2026-release, the song appeared on the US Bubbling Under Hot 100, US Hot R&B/Hip-Hop Songs, and New Zealand Hot Singles charts.

== Background ==
Tyler, the Creator had previously uploaded freestyle tracks during the interim between Flower Boy (2017) and Igor (2019), releasing "435", "Gelato", "Peach Fuzz", "Bronco", and "Potato Salad", with the latter featuring ASAP Rocky. On October 28, 2024, he released his eighth studio album Chromakopia to critical acclaim and commercial success, which became his third Billboard 200 number one album and sold nearly 300,000 units during its first week of release. On November 22, Kendrick Lamar released his studio album GNX without prior announcement, which included the track "Hey Now" as it featured elements of bounce music.

== Music and lyrics ==
A West Coast hip-hop track, "That Guy" is a freestyle track over the instrumental of Lamar's "Hey Now", which was produced by Sounwave, Jack Antonoff, and Mustard. Over a "gritty bass-heavy beat", the song showcases Tyler, the Creator's lyrical flexing based on his wealth and influence, such as his luxury car collection and success of Chromakopia.

Tyler, the Creator makes multiple references throughout the song, including his appearance from Lamar's Pop Out concert that took place in June 2024, various hot spots from the Southwestern Los Angeles area, and his sexual orientation with the line "All these girls is a habit/Boyfriends mad because they thought I was a ...".

== Release and commercial performance ==
On December 25, 2024, Tyler, the Creator released a freestyle remix of Lamar's "Hey Now" (2024) without prior announcement on YouTube, which he dedicated as a Christmas gift to his fans. His announcement of the release on X was a response to a November comment from a fan who asked if Tyler, the Creator could freestyle on "Hey Now". It is the first song Tyler, the Creator released since Chromakopia.

On June 23, 2026, "That Guy" was released to streaming platforms with exclusively distribution by Columbia Records. Upon its re-release, the song peaked at number seventeen on the US Bubbling Under Hot 100 chart and number 37 on the US Hot R&B/Hip-Hop Songs chart, both dated on the week of July 11, 2026. Additionally, "That Guy" peaked at number seventeen on the New Zealand Hot Singles chart.

== Critical reception ==
Pitchfork writer Matthew Strauss compared "That Guy" to Tyler, the Creator's other freestyle track "What the Fuck Right Now" (2016), which was rapped over Kanye West's "Freestyle 4" from The Life of Pablo (2016). An Express Tribune writer provided a similar compliment, considering "That Guy" to demonstrate Tyler, the Creator's ability to reinterpret other music artists' work while retaining his own style. Alexander Cole of HotNewHipHop considered the song's lyrical style to be "incredibly energetic and catchy", and hoped that Tyler, the Creator's tradition of releasing music on Christmas Day would continue. Quincy of Ratings Game Music described "That Guy" as an "asshole anthem", where Tyler, the Creator comes off as "cocky, hyphy, and completely locked in" while embracing his "douchebag energy."

Despite a generally positive reception, "That Guy" had been scrutinized by Tyler, the Creator's fanbase. He addressed the situation during an interview with Nardwuar in March 2025, stating that the criticism was hypocritical as hip-hop had a history of remixes and freestyles over other artists' work. He also claimed that the criticism came from people "who did not grow up listening to rap or hip-hop."

== Music video ==
The self-directed music video shows Tyler, the Creator rapping the song's lyrics while dancing in the street in various locations in Hawthorne, California, which is his hometown. Similar to the lyrics of "That Guy", he flexes "all over his peers" as he shows off his Ferrari and designer clothing. At the music video's conclusion, Tyler, the Creator reunites with Odd Future members Travis "Taco" Bennett, Jasper Dolphin, and Lionel "L-Boy" Boyce as they "attempt to ride a bike together up an empty street."

== Personnel ==
Credits are adapted from Tidal.

- Tyler Okonma – vocals, writing, recording engineer
- Jack Antonoff – writing, production
- Dijon McFarlane – writing, production
- Mark Anthony Spears – writing, production
- Barry Lewis Adams Jr. – writing
- Zarius Cunningham – writing
- Kendrick Lamar – writing
- Lefabian Williams – writing
- Zachary Acosta – assistant mixing engineer
- Mike Bozzi – mastering engineer
- NealHPogue – mixing engineer

== Charts ==
Weekly chart performance for "That Guy"
Chart (2026)	Peak position
New Zealand Hot Singles (RMNZ)	17
US Bubbling Under Hot 100 (Billboard)	17
US Hot R&B/Hip-Hop Songs (Billboard)	37
