= Radicals (song) =

Song by Tyler, the Creator

from the album Goblin
- Released: May 10, 2011
- Genre: Horrorcore; industrial hip hop
- Length: 7:21
- Label: XL
- Songwriters: Tyler, the Creator
- Producers: Tyler, the Creator

"Radicals" is a song written, produced, and performed by American rapper and producer Tyler, the Creator. It was released as the third song from his second studio album Goblin (2011), released through XL Recordings. The song, a horrorcore record, also features additional vocals from fellow Odd Future members (and siblings) Taco and Syd tha Kyd. Tyler was interested in making a music video for the track, although these plans never came into fruition.

Upon its release, the song received mixed reviews from music critics. Although it was not released as a single, "Radicals" has become one of the most popular tracks from Goblin in recent years, possibly in part due to its controversies.It sparked controversy due to its lyrical themes, and it would receive even more controversy after a student attending the University of South Alabama wrote the lyrics of the chorus on school property.

== Background and composition ==
As with many of his early songs, "Radicals" features many explicit lyrics and controversial, violent messages. Tyler is encouraging listeners to question authority and take action, although he expresses it in a violent way. However, he begins the song by asking the listeners not to take any of the violent lyrics seriously.

"Random disclaimer!

Hey, don't do anything that I say in this song, OK?

It's fucking fiction

If anything happens, don't fuckin' blame me, white America

Fuck Bill O'Reilly"

- Tyler, the Creator on "Radicals".

The chorus of "Radicals" became a sort of rallying cry for fans, and was chanted at concerts. The chorus is actually reused from a song by fellow Odd Future member Earl Sweatshirt from his first mixtape Earl entitled "Pidgeons". The chorus of that song was written and performed by Tyler, and not Earl. The chorus of "Radicals" also features additional vocals by Taco and Syd tha Kyd. The second half of the song is much calmer, and features backing vocals from Syd tha Kyd.

The song was performed live numerous times with Tyler's group Odd Future, usually as a show closer. In some cases, the group were accompanied by the hardcore band Trash Talk.

=== Controversy ===
"Radicals" would become a subject of controversy in 2019. Jack Aaron Christensen, a student attending the University of South Alabama, was accused of writing the lyrics of the song in a library on the 18th anniversary of the 9/11 terrorist attacks, and was arrested later that day. The story was covered by numerous news outlets, including Billboard, Pitchfork, Complex and Rolling Stone The Mobile County District Attorney refused to comment, but the school's Vice President Michael Mitchell did decide to elaborate.

"The students involved in each incident have been barred from university property pending the outcome of student conduct processes. No matter the circumstances, our police must treat any possible threat with the utmost seriousness and act immediately to ensure the safety of our campus community." - Michael Mitchell.

Christensen and another student (uninvolved with this case) were both charged with making terrorist threats and were expelled from the school.

Tyler was previously banned from the UK and New Zealand for lyrics from his first two albums Bastard and Goblin, with "Radicals" most likely being one of the culprits. New Zealand government officials called his lyrics "a potential threat to public order."

== Critical reception ==
"Radicals" received much attention in reviews for Goblin. In terms of positive reviews, Huw Jones from Slant Magazine called the chorus "(one of) music’s most provocative refrains of all time". However, some critics weren't as kind to the song. In the Pitchfork review for Goblin, the track was called "cringe-worthy", and the L.A. Times called it "one of the dumbest, laziest songs of the year".

In an article about Goblin by Slate Magazine, half of the entire review was about "Radicals". The reviewer called the first part of the song funny and cartoonish. He also described Tyler's lyrics from the second half (where he tells the listener to be who they want to be) as "unconvincing (and) corny".

== Cancelled music video ==
In a 2011 interview with DJ Semtex, Tyler stated that he wanted to make a video for the song, but most likely wouldn't be able to as he wanted it to include him blowing things up. In 2012, he would again talk about wanting to film and release a video, but this idea never came to fruition.

== Personnel ==
Credits adapted from Tidal.

- Tyler, the Creator (credited as Wolf Haley) – lead vocals, production
- Syd tha Kyd – additional vocals, mixing, engineering
- Taco – additional vocals
- Brian "Big Bass" Gardner – mastering
