= Nilbog =

Nilbog is "goblin" spelled backwards (an anadrome).

Nilbog can refer to:

- Nilbog, a type of goblin from the Dungeons & Dragons universe
- Nilbog, the name of a fictional town and county from Troll 2
- Nilbog High, a fictional school from Guitar Hero II
- Nilbog, a supervillain in the web serial Worm
- Nilbog, a street sign that has been featured in Tyler, the Creator's music video "She"
