= 2DopeBoyz =

American hip hop music website

- Website type: Music website
- Available in: English
- Owners: Meka Udoh, Joel Zela
- Website: 2dopeboyz.com
- Commercial: Yes
- Registration: Optional
- Launched: 2007; 19 years ago
- Current status: Online

2DopeBoyz is an online hip hop music review, news and criticism website launched in 2007 by Meka Udoh and Joel "Shake" Zela, who were former editors at HipHopDX. The website played a central role in hip hop's blog era of the mid-2000s and early 2010s, a period of growth for non-mainstream outlets as music media transitioned from primarily print and radio-based to online outlets and social media. 2DOPEBOYZ and other blogs like it helped promote unsigned and unknown rappers to notoriety, launching the careers of many of the star artists of the period.

== History ==
Udoh and Zela started the blog as a hobby with a focus on the West Coast. In 2008, 2DopeBoyz joined other blogs including OnSMASH, Miss Info's eponymous blog, and Nah Right to form the New Music Cartel, a loose professional collective created to help the defining blogs of Hip Hop's blog era compete with larger print, radio, and technology companies.

In June 2017, 2DopeBoyz was one of several music websites and blogs who had their Twitter accounts suspended over copyright claims from major labels like Viacom and Atlantic Records.

As part of Jay Z's 4:44 album rollout, cryptic ads featuring the album name on a peach-colored background were bought on sites including 2DopeBoyz, Complex, and The Undefeated. The ads did not link to anything, but Spin reported the image's source code included reference to Jay Z's music streaming website Tidal.

In 2018, when Zela tweeted he was considering shutting the website down, rapper Kendrick Lamar encouraged him not to and said that hip-hop needed 2DopeBoyz. The blog is often credited with playing an early role in the promotion of Lamar's career.

=== Feud with Tyler, the Creator ===
In the title track of Tyler, the Creator's 2009 album Bastard, the first words Tyler says are cursing 2DopeBoyz, NahRight, and other blogs who Tyler viewed as snubbing him early on in his career. On the title track of fellow Odd Future member Earl Sweatshirt's 2010 mixtape, Earl, Earl, Tyler, and Taco Bennett rap about their distaste for 2DOPEBOYZ.

In 2011, Tyler, the Creator announced the release date of his second album Goblin with a video on his website that flashed the words "Fuck 2DopeBoyz & NahRight". On the song "Sandwitches" off of Goblin, Tyler rapped "Fuck 2DopeBoyz, all them niggas bitches/We don't need y'all, The Fader's who we really fucking with, bitch."
