= Goblin (album) =

2011 studio album by Tyler, the Creator

Studio album by Tyler, the Creator
- Released: May 10, 2011
- Studios: Opra Music (Los Angeles); The Trap (Los Angeles)
- Genres: Alternative hip-hop; horrorcore
- Length: 73:49
- Label: XL
- Producers: Left Brain; Tyler, the Creator

Tyler, the Creator chronology
Bastard (2009)	Goblin (2011)	Wolf (2013)

Deluxe edition cover

Singles from Goblin
- 1. "Sandwitches" Released: October 8, 2010; 2. "Yonkers" Released: February 14, 2011; 3. "She" Released: May 10, 2011

Goblin is the second studio album and major label debut by the American rapper Tyler, the Creator. It was released on May 10, 2011, by XL Recordings. Goblin continues Tyler's dialogues with his fictional therapist Dr. TC, first heard on his 2009 album, Bastard. The album's songs were produced almost entirely by Tyler himself, along with a contribution from fellow Odd Future member Left Brain. The album features guest appearances from Odd Future members Frank Ocean, Hodgy Beats, Jasper Dolphin, Taco, Domo Genesis, Mike G and Syd.

Goblin was supported by three singles: "Sandwitches", "Yonkers" and "She". The single "Yonkers" is considered responsible for garnering the significant internet and industry buzz surrounding Odd Future at the time of the album's release. The album received generally positive reviews from critics, debuting at number five on the US Billboard 200.

== Background ==
After the release of Bastard, Tyler signed to British independent label XL Recordings and announced Goblin after the release of "Yonkers". Close friend and fellow Odd Future member Earl Sweatshirt was notably not featured on the album due to attending Coral Reef Academy in Samoa at the time.

== Music and lyrics ==
"Yonkers"
A 23-second sample from "Yonkers" that showcases Okonma's transgressive lyrics over a minimalistic beat.

Goblin continues the horrorcore subject matter first displayed on Bastard. Fictional therapist, Dr. TC, appears throughout the album. The second track, "Yonkers", features a gritty beat with a large bass sound, reminiscent of the production of Wu-Tang Clan leader RZA. Tyler claims to have made the instrumental in eight minutes as a parody of New York City beats. The third track, "Radicals", talks about youthful rebellion. The chorus contains the chanted lines "Kill people, burn shit, fuck school", which was previously used by Tyler on Earl Sweatshirt's song "Pigions" from his 2010 mixtape, Earl. Pranav Trewn of Stereogum commented on the song, stating "[It] isn't an anthem of retaliation, but rather self-immolation; you have to purge everything else to discover what's left of yourself". "Bitch Suck Dick" is an over-the-top trap parody featuring stereotypical misogynistic lyrics from Jasper Dolphin and Taco, similar to Bastard's "Tina" and Wolf's "Trashwang". On the album's final track, "Golden", it's revealed that Dr. TC is just Tyler's conscience, and everyone he was interacting with were a figment of his imagination.

== Release ==
On October 8, 2010, Tyler and Hodgy released "Sandwitches" on Odd Future's official website for free. On February 10, 2011, Tyler released the music video for the first single, "Yonkers", from the album. An extended version with an extra verse was later released on iTunes four days later, along with an extended version of the previously released track "Sandwitches". On February 16, Tyler and Hodgy Beats performed "Sandwitches" on Late Night with Jimmy Fallon, making it the first television appearance for any Odd Future member. One month later, on March 16, 2011, Tyler and Hodgy Beats performed the tracks "Yonkers" and "Sandwitches" on the mtvU Woodie Awards with the rest of Odd Future. On that same day, a preview of "Tron Cat" was released online as promotion for the album. Also in March, the album cover was posted online featuring a colored picture of Buffalo Bill when he was 19, and it was featured as a backdrop for Tyler's MTV performance. On March 24, Tyler posted the track list on his Twitter, and the track "Sandwitches" was to be included on the album.

On March 17, 2011, Tyler announced the release date of Goblin with a video on his website that flashed the words "Fuck 2DopeBoyz & NahRight", slamming two blogs who he claimed didn't give him recognition early in his career.

Goblin was also released as a deluxe edition with alternate artwork and packaging, a poster, lyrics, and a second disc containing three bonus tracks. Tyler released the deluxe edition cover of the album on his Flickr on April 4, 2011. On April 21, Tyler posted several pictures from the filming of a new music video, followed by an announcement that the video is finished on the next day. On April 22, Tyler released a promo video involving himself portraying a character named Thurnis Haley who is a golfer. On April 28, "Tron Cat" was leaked online. On May 3, Tyler and Hodgy Beats performed "Sandwitches" and "Analog" on BBC, along with them performing "65" off of the upcoming MellowHype album.

The third single to be released from the album was "She" featuring Frank Ocean. The music video for "She" was released June 3, 2011.

The music video for "Bitch Suck Dick" featuring Jasper Dolphin and Taco was released on October 11, 2011.

== Critical reception ==
Professional ratings
Aggregate scores
Source	Rating
AnyDecentMusic?	7.3/10
Metacritic	72/100
Review scores
Source	Rating
AllMusic	4/5 stars
The A.V. Club	B+
Entertainment Weekly	A−
HipHopDX	4.0/5
Los Angeles Times	2/4 stars
Now	2/5
Pitchfork	8.0/10
PopMatters	8/10
Rolling Stone	3.5/5 stars
Slant Magazine	4.5/5 stars

Goblin was met with generally positive reviews. At Metacritic, which assigns a normalized rating out of 100 to reviews from professional publications, the album received an average score of 72, based on 37 reviews. Aggregator AnyDecentMusic? gave it 7.3 out of 10, based on their assessment of the critical consensus.

Jon Dolan from Rolling Stone complimenting the album's "lush, left-field R&B-tinged tracks" along with its "early-Eminem evil" lyrics. David Jeffries of AllMusic commenting that "Tyler's production is as attractive as ever, contrasting his disgusting rhymes and gruff voice with subdued, sometimes serene beats that echo and creep". Brad Wete of Entertainment Weekly said, "Too bad Kanye—who's also a fan—already used the title last fall, because Goblin is one Beautiful Dark Twisted Fantasy". Slant Magazine critic Huw Jones praising its production and stating that "Goblin could well be one of the decade's most significant releases...a masterpiece for those capable of stomaching it". The reviewer Jen Long from the BBC enjoyed Tyler's lyrical "run of shock tactics reminiscent of Eminem", many strongly criticized the similarity. Joshua Errett of Now said that someone should have informed Tyler that "Eminem already did this 15 years ago". Louis Pattison of NME said, "It's an album that leaves you in no doubt that Odd Future's leader is a rare talent".

Evan Rytlewski of The A.V. Club said, "Brash and unwieldy as it seems on the surface, Goblin is a deliberately created work of art, one of the densest and most provocative statements that independent rap has produced in years". Scott Plagenhoef of Pitchfork said, "His fantasies and lack of filter are still huge roadblocks for many if not most listeners. They're depraved and despicable, tied in part to a long and unfortunate legacy of gangster and street rap. They're also one aspect of a larger, character-driven story—a license that we grant to visual arts, film, and literature but rarely to pop music". Max Feldman of PopMatters said, "It's that sort of shameful thing that would prevent us from seeing Goblin for what it really is: a massive spoonful of marvelous hip-hop medicine, of the most unnerving, hyperreal humour you may well ever hear". Chris Martins of Spin said, "Is the entire thing about 20 minutes too long? Probably. But the obvious lack of outside meddling proves that Tyler's auteur status remains intact. He is, in the parlance of our times, still swaggin'. Now maybe he can get to work on winning that Grammy". Randal Roberts from the Los Angeles Times commented that the album just "presses the same button that Elvis, Johnny Rotten, Chuck D and Eminem did" and after "about 50 minutes you just want Tyler, the Creator to shut the hell up".

== Retrospective ==
In a 2018 interview with GQ, Tyler called Goblin "horrible". He stated that he would only keep seven tracks from the album: "Yonkers", "She", "Nightmare", "Tron Cat", "Fish", "Analog" and "AU79".

== Commercial performance ==
Goblin debuted at number five on the Billboard 200, with first-week sales of 45,000 copies in the United States. As of April 2013, the album has sold 230,000 copies in the United States. On January 30, 2018, Goblin was certified gold by the Recording Industry Association of America (RIAA). As of 2012, the album has sold 25,000 copies in United Kingdom.

== Track listing ==
All songs are produced by Tyler, the Creator (T. Okonma), except for "Transylvania", which is produced by Left Brain.

Goblin track listing
No.	Title	Writer(s)	Length
1.	"Goblin"	Tyler Okonma	6:48
2.	"Yonkers"	Okonma	4:09
3.	"Radicals"	Okonma	7:18
4.	"She" (featuring Frank Ocean)	Okonma; Christopher Breaux	4:13
5.	"Transylvania"	Okonma; Vyron Turner	3:12
6.	"Nightmare"	Okonma	5:22
7.	"Tron Cat"	Okonma	4:13
8.	"Her"	Okonma	3:31
9.	"Sandwitches" (featuring Hodgy Beats)	Okonma; Gerard Long	4:51
10.	"Fish"	Okonma; Breaux	6:19
11.	"Analog" (featuring Hodgy Beats)	Okonma; Long	2:54
12.	"Bitch Suck Dick" (featuring Jasper Dolphin and Taco)	Okonma; Davon Wilson; Travis Bennett	3:36
13.	"Window" (featuring Domo Genesis, Frank Ocean, Hodgy Beats and Mike G)	Okonma; Dominique Cole; Breaux; Long; Michael Griffin II	8:00
14.	"AU79" (instrumental)	Okonma	3:40
15.	"Golden"	Okonma	5:43
Total length:			73:49

Deluxe edition (bonus tracks)
No.	Title	Writer(s)	Length
16.	"Burger" (featuring Hodgy Beats)	Okonma; Long	3:49
17.	"Untitled 63" (instrumental)	Okonma	1:06
18.	"Steak Sauce"	Okonma	3:22
Total length:			82:06

Notes

- "Fish" contains the hidden track "Boppin' Bitch"

== Personnel ==
- Tyler, the Creator (credited as Wolf Haley) – production, vocals
- Left Brain – production (track 5)
- Syd tha Kyd – mixing, additional vocals (tracks 3, 7, 10, 15)
- Taco – additional vocals (tracks 3, 6)
- Frank Ocean – additional vocals (track 10)
- Brian "Big Bass" Gardner – mastering

== Charts ==
=== Weekly charts ===
Chart performance for Goblin
Chart (2011)	Peak position
Australian Albums (ARIA)	66
Belgian Albums (Ultratop Flanders)	62
Canadian Albums (Billboard)	16
Danish Albums (Hitlisten)	13
Dutch Albums (Album Top 100)	20
German Albums (Offizielle Top 100)	97
Irish Albums (IRMA)	44
Japanese Albums (Oricon)	147
Norwegian Albums (VG-lista)	12
UK Albums (Official Charts)	21
UK R&B Albums (Official Charts)	2
US Billboard 200	5
US Independent Albums (Billboard)	1
US Top R&B/Hip-Hop Albums (Billboard)	1

=== Year-end charts ===
2011 year-end chart performance for Goblin
Chart (2011)	Position
US Top R&B/Hip-Hop Albums (Billboard)	53

2012 year-end chart performance for Goblin
Chart (2012)	Position
US Top R&B/Hip-Hop Albums (Billboard)	70

== Certifications ==
Certifications for Goblin
Region	Certification	Certified units/sales
Canada (Music Canada)	Gold	40,000^{‡}
United Kingdom (BPI)	Gold	100,000^{‡}
United States (RIAA)	Platinum	1,000,000^{‡}
^{‡} Sales+streaming figures based on certification alone.
