= Loiter Squad =

American live-action sketch comedy television series

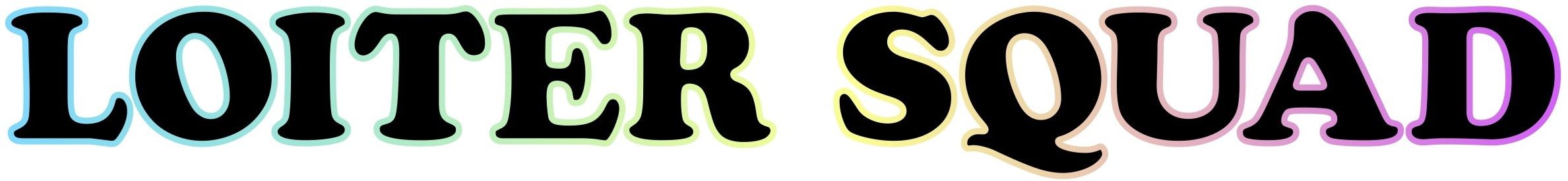
- Created by: Odd Future
- Starring: Tyler, the Creator; Jasper Dolphin; Earl Sweatshirt; Travis "Taco" Bennett; Lionel "L-Boy" Boyce
- Music by: Michael Baiardi; Odd Future; Tyler, the Creator; Patric Caird; Matt Martians
- Opening theme: "I Like Cheese"
- Composers: Tyler, the Creator
- Country of origin: United States
- Original language: English
- No. of seasons: 3
- No. of episodes: 31

Production
- Executive producers: Jeff Tremaine; Dimitry Elyashkevich; Lance Bangs; Shanna Zablow; Nick Weidenfeld; Greg Iguchi; Keith Crofford (Note: executive producer for Williams Street); Mike Lazzo (Note: executive producer for Williams Street, season 3)
- Producers: Tyler Okonma; Travis "Taco" Bennett; Lionel "L-Boy" Boyce; Jasper Dolphin; Chris Clancy; Kelly Sato Clancy; Dave Airaudi (Note: seasons 1-2); Earl Sweatshirt (Note: season 3); Knate Gwaltney (Note: supervising producer); Barry Smoler; Ollie Green (Note: producer for Williams Street); Walter Newman (Note: producer for Williams Street, season 3)
- Editors: Seth Casriel; Matthew Kosinski; Matthew J. Powers; Matthew Probst; Carter Slade; Franky Guttman; Todd Kendall; Nathan Gunn; Brian Forbes; Jared McClurg
- Running time: 10 minutes
- Production companies: Dickhouse Productions (Season 1–2); Gorilla Flicks (Season 3); The Great Wang of the Floggnaw Land (Season 3); Williams Street

Original release
- Network: Adult Swim
- Release: March 25, 2012 – July 17, 2014

Loiter Squad is an American live-action sketch comedy television series for Adult Swim created and starring Odd Future members; Tyler, the Creator, Earl Sweatshirt, Jasper Dolphin, Travis "Taco" Bennett, and Lionel "L-Boy" Boyce. The show regularly featured other members of the group as well.

The show was produced by Dickhouse Productions for Cartoon Network's Adult Swim programming block during its first and second seasons. The show ran from March 25, 2012 to July 17, 2014.

The show features multiple skits most notably "Maurice," "Po-Po," "Storage War$," "Beyond Scared Straight," "E.T," "Lionel Booty Hunter," and more. On July 14, 2015, Tyler, the Creator confirmed that the show was "no more," stating, “It opened the doors up for other things that my boys want to do. That was a great thing, but we’re off that.”

== History ==
The pilot for the show was initially announced on March 11, 2011, after Los Angeles hip hop collective Odd Future began to receive mainstream recognition, with the premise originally being described as a combination of Jackass and Chappelle's Show. Later, the series was rumored to be named Blackass, a portmanteau of the TV series Jackass, due to an on-air bump from Adult Swim claiming that was the temporary title, "at least until S&P calls" them out on it. However, on April 22, 2011, Tyler, the Creator debunked the title on his official Twitter account, potentially not even knowing its origin. Then, it was not until September 8, 2011 that the show, by then officially titled Loiter Squad, was finally confirmed as a 15-minute live action show composed of various sketches, man on the street segments, pranks, and music made by Odd Future.

Loiter Squad premiered on Sunday, March 25, 2012 on Cartoon Network's Adult Swim programming block. Episode 2 featured an appearance from Jackass alumnus Johnny Knoxville while fellow Jackass cast members Bam Margera, Chris Pontius and Dave England have also made guest appearances. Other appearances have included rappers Xzibit, Lil Wayne and Juicy J, actor Seth Rogen, and Indie rock musician Mac Demarco. In February 2013, Pitchfork reported that Earl Sweatshirt and Blake Anderson would join the show for its second season, which premiered on March 10, 2013, on Adult Swim.

Loiter Squad was renewed for a third season and premiered on May 15, 2014. It was produced by Gorilla Flicks, the new production company of Jeff Tremaine, and by The Great Wang of the Floggnaw Land, the production company of Tyler, the Creator.

In July 2015, Tyler, the Creator stated that Loiter Squad would not continue after its third season.

== Cast ==
=== Main cast ===
- Tyler, the Creator
- Jasper Dolphin
- Earl Sweatshirt
- Travis "Taco" Bennett
- Lionel "L-Boy" Boyce

=== Guest appearances ===
Notable guest appearances include:

- The Alchemist
- Blake Anderson
- George Clinton
- Mac DeMarco
- The Dudesons
- Dave England
- Fatlip
- Shelby Fero
- Freddie Gibbs
- Tony Hawk
- IceJJFish
- Juicy J
- Johnny Knoxville
- Lil Wayne
- Bam Margera
- Mac Miller
- Kel Mitchell
- Chris Pontius
- Seth Rogen
- Kanye West
- Xzibit

== Episodes ==
Season	Episodes	Originally released	
Season	Episodes	First released	Last released
1	11	March 25, 2012	June 3, 2012
2	10	March 17, 2013	May 12, 2013
3	10	May 15, 2014	July 17, 2014

=== Season 1 (2012) ===
No. overall	No. in season	Title	Original release date	Prod. code	US viewers (millions)
1	1	"Episode 1"	March 25, 2012	101	1.72
Dr. Muhammed is the remarkable dentist with no arms; Emo Patrick posts responses to skits on YouPoop; Tyler loses a leg in a backyard bloodbath. Named sketches: Backyard Gator Wrestling, Emotional Patrick, Dental Hygiene With Dr. Muhammad The Armless Dentist, Street Bubbles and Firestation Surprise.
2	2	"Episode 2"	April 1, 2012	100	1.80
Thurnis Haley talks balls and soup; Xzibit refuses to pimp his date's ride; Po-Po officers take down two homicidal dancers. Named sketches: Street Lurking, Po-Po, Cowboys Say The Darndest Things, Ninja Surprise, Thurnis Haley, Full Moon and SK8 Challenge.
3	3	"Episode 3"	April 8, 2012	103	1.54
Lionel the Booty Hunter; the Channel 5 News presents puppies and catamarans; a new D'Angelo video drops. Named sketches: Channel 5 News, Secret Agents, Lionel The Booty Hunter, Men On The Street, D'Angelo Video and OFWGKTA Tour Bus.
4	4	"Episode 4"	April 15, 2012	102	1.80
Thurnis Haley recounts a tragic story while washing his balls; Po-Po officers bust some illegal Cubans; bands-aids get a blacktop makeover. Named sketches: Cattle Prod, Thurnis Haley, Invisible Ropes, Negro Strips, Cuban Cigars, The World According To Taco and Po-Po.
5	5	"Episode 5"	April 22, 2012	104	N/A
E.T.'s arrest leads to an interrogation room shootout; a pickup basketball game goes bottomless; some angry ice dancers take down a pig and a school. Named sketches: E.T. The Prisoner, Voicebox Prank, Chicken Noodle Soup, OFWGKTA Book Signing, Bottomless Basketball and Loiter Squad On Ice.
6	6	"Episode 6"	April 29, 2012	105	1.61
It's not easy for Sagan being 16 & Pregnant; Tyler learns an important lesson about sexual harassment; 80s video dating makes a comeback. Named sketches: Sexual Harassment Seminar, Sagan, Street Orange, Pickle Mistake, The Dating Tape, Drake and Hairball Wake Up.
7	7	"Episode 7"	May 6, 2012	106	1.76
Thurnis Haley shares his wisdom at a golf shop; Tyler and Lionel remake Miami Vice; Black Shaun White shows off his stunts. Named sketches: Miami Vice, Black Shaun White, Thurnis Haley, Channel 5 News and Pop Up Shop Bets.
8	8	"Episode 8"	May 13, 2012	107	1.47
Maurice finds out who's the daddy; Tyler, Jasper, and Lionel play with fish; Fernando teaches the art of dance. Named sketches: Fish Market, Maurice, Is This Your Fish?, Fernando, Po-Po and Day Laboring.
9	9	"Episode 9"	May 20, 2012	108	N/A
Mars and Sabrina Williams meet fans at a local tennis court; Mike G investigates a murder; Hodgy takes on a gang. Named sketches: Mars & Sabrina Williams, Beanbag Madness, Mike G.S.I., Trick Shots and Purple Pow.
10	10	"Episode 10"	May 27, 2012	109	1.43
Young Nigga and Gunshot go to court over a video game; Jasper kung fu fights; Blackass. Named sketches: Blackass, Kung Fu Looking Ass Ninjas, Young N-word, Honey I Shrunk The Squad and Channel 5 News.
11	11	"Episode 11"	June 3, 2012	110	1.38
Puppets fight and reveal secrets; Jefferson, Darnell, and Murphy go on the Mating Game; Taco wears the wrong camouflage during war. Named sketches: The Mating Game, Wrong Camouflage, Channel 5 News, The Yummies, Thurnis Haley, The World According To Taco and Surprise Farty.

=== Season 2 (2013) ===
Most of the episodes in this season are named after Black movies, with the season finale being the only exception, as Roots was actually a miniseries.

No. overall	No. in season	Title	Original release date	Prod. code	US viewers (millions)
12	1	"Soul Food"	March 10, 2013	201	1.60
The guys welcome Blake Anderson and Earl Sweatshirt, Lionel tries out new catchphrases with the character, Catchphrase Jones, and Tyler trains a rookie at a diner. Named sketches: Blake Anderson, Catchphrase Jones, Musty Burger, Loiter Squad Pictures and Tony The Intelligent Goon.
13	2	"Waiting to Exhale"	March 17, 2013	202	1.54
The guys do their own spin on the Real Housewives Reunion and skate with Tony Hawk. Lionel wakes up a friend, Taco tells how his life has changed since his last twat. Named sketches: Larry H. Dark Shark, The Real Housewives Of Atlanta, Trapped With Tyler Prank, Po-Po, Jefferson Goes Shopping, The World According To Taco, In Pool Skating and Dimitry Wake Up.
14	3	"Jason's Lyric"	March 24, 2013	203	1.53
The Po-Po need help solving a big case with Mike G.S.I. as they are looking for Jefferson's hideout where he is making a cat suit out of cat skin, the guys use black holes, Taco and Mike G. fight in a bounce house, and a new music video from Young Nigga debuts in the show. Named sketches: Mike G.S.I., Loop Hole, Dark Shark Attack, OFWGKTA'S Guide To Threading, Bouncyhouse Boxing and Young N-word.
15	4	"How Stella Got Her Groove Back"	March 31, 2013	204	1.64
The guys welcome back an old friend; Jasper, Mike, and Taco audition for a fake commercial for an energy drink which is a prank set up by Tyler and Lionel as the guys will get smacked at the end, and Lionel stars in The Blind Side 2. Named sketches: Chris's Challenge, Blake Anderson, The Blindside, Nonde Hai Prank, Homies On A Stoop, Rolling With Dark Shark and Street Magic.
16	5	"Poetic Justice"	April 7, 2013	205	1.53
The Shady Bunch has bad luck in Hawaii, Mars and Sabrina get pedicures, Jasper gives advice. Named sketches: Dick Drizzle, The Shady Bunch, Black Buddha, Mars & Sabrina Williams and OFWGKTA Pop Up Shop.
17	6	"Boyz in Da Hood"	April 14, 2013	206	1.56
The guys go to jail, get adopted, and meet new Finnish friends The Dudesons. Guest starring: George Clinton, The Dudesons Named sketches: Zombie Cooking, Bitch I'm Stuck In Jail, Rubberband Torture, Rich White Dad, Super Fly Fishing, Homies On A Stoop and Finnish Bed Of Nails.
18	7	"Menace 2 Society"	April 21, 2013	207	1.45
The guys hunt for treasure; Jasper makes a bike jump; and Earl has problems with his roommate. Named sketches: Mary J. Blige, The Legend Of Fah Fah, Rolling With Dark Shark, Po-Po, Jasper's Bike Jump, What's Good Comedy Club and Barfield.
19	8	"Set It Off"	April 28, 2013	208	1.48
Tyler hates his new stepfather Bam Margera, Taco hits the streets in a bathtub, and the cast gets new dolls with surprising powers. Named sketches: Dubstep Dad, Never Say Never, Left Brain Right Foot Stunt, Emotional Patrick Prank, Ashy Man, Street Tubing and Boo Boo Dolls.
20	9	"Jungle Fever"	May 5, 2013	209	1.25
The cast attempts an intervention; Jasper and Tyler face moral dilemmas. Taco changes the game. Named sketches: Mesh Shirt Inventor, Catchphrase Jones, Workout Mike, Leonard's Intervention, Jungle Brothers and Jasper's About To Do The Intro.
21	10	"Roots"	May 12, 2013	210	1.47
Emo Patrick calls someone; the guys participate in eating challenges; and Taco shares his wisdom. Named sketches: Musty's, Celebrity Survivor, Rolling With Dark Shark, Emotional Patrick Prank, The World According To Taco, Black Metal Balloons and Messy On These Streets.

=== Season 3 (2014) ===
All the episodes in this season are named after professional wrestling moves.

No. overall	No. in season	Title	Original release date	Prod. code	US viewers (millions)
22	1	"Sweet Chin Music"	May 15, 2014	TBA	1.46
The guys take it to another level with Blake Anderson; Jasper shows off his cooking skills. Guest starring: Kanye West Named sketches: Restaurant Riot, Loiter Squad Educational Toys, Swingset Foolery, Wacky Chef Styles, Camp Flog Gnaw Skating and LSTV.
23	2	"Figure Four Leg Lock"	May 22, 2014	TBA	1.69
The dangers of drug use in the workplace are explored; Seth Rogen gets advice from Tyler. Guest starring: Seth Rogen Named sketches: Figure Four Leg Lock (named after the title of the episode), Cocaine Carl, Dark Shark Shopping Networks, The Yummies and Lightskin Awareness.
24	3	"Sharpshooter"	May 29, 2014	TBA	1.69
Earl searches for a roommate; Lionel shares some insight. Named sketches: X Mayne, Barfield, Love & Hip-Hop, Milk PSA, Wet Dream Education Video and Lettuce Milk.
25	4	"Walls of Jericho"	June 5, 2014	TBA	1.65
Young Nigga premieres his new video at a press conference.
26	5	"Rock Bottom; People's Elbow"	June 12, 2014	TBA	1.63
Catchphrase Jones returns; family and friends have a funeral. Named sketches: Catchphrase Jones, Rare Breeds, Mesh Shirt For President, Back To The Future Parody and Cocaine Carl's Funeral.
27	6	"Stone Cold Stunner"	June 19, 2014	TBA	1.22
Lionel and Jasper wrestle tigers; Maurice helps Mac Miller combat his phobias. Named Sketches: Office Tiger Wrestling, Maurice, Voicebox Prank, Dark Shark Shopping Networks and Lightskin Awareness.
28	7	"Razor's Edge"	June 26, 2014	TBA	1.80
The guys audition for roles in a movie; Left Brain has questions for people on the streets. Named sketches: 12 Years A Slave Auditions, Men On The Street, It Takes A Village, Po-Po and Kel The Creator.
29	8	"Pedigree"	July 3, 2014	TBA	1.56
Tatiana's sleepover goes awry; Taco learns a lesson. Named sketches: Jesus He's Ugly, Sleepover At Tatiana's, Lionel's Highlight Tape, Lionel's Street Reports, Skate Madness and It Takes A Village.
30	9	"Tombstone"	July 10, 2014	TBA	N/A
Taco becomes the smartest man in the world thanks to his sister Syd tha Kyd; the guys put on the greatest show of their lives. Named Sketches: Loiter Squad Show Performance, Storage Wars, Love & Hip-hop, When N****s Snap and Taco Discovers Coffee.
31	10	"Bronco Buster"	July 17, 2014	TBA	1.52
Lionel has a new sweat suit; Tyler gets friendly with an older woman. Named sketches: Sweatsuit Wednesday, Maurice, Beyond Scared Straight, Workplace Harassment PSA and Old Lady Love.
