= IceJJFish =

American musician (born 1994)

- Also known as: IceJJFish
- Born: Daniel McLoyd; July 30, 1994 (age 32); Chicago, Illinois, U.S.
- Genres: Trap; hip-hop; gospel
- Occupations: Singer; rapper; producer
- Years active: 2013–present

Daniel McLoyd (born July 30, 1994), better known as IceJJFish, is an American Internet personality, singer, rapper, and dancer known for his vocals and his song "On the Floor", which has reached over 92 million views on YouTube as of December 2025. The popularity that he gained from the song's virality led to him becoming an Internet sensation and being featured in various TV shows and Internet podcasts. The attention that his music received led to him being comically labeled as the "King of R&B" and a meme by various notable figures and outlets. In 2019, he decided to pursue gospel music. He has officially released three studio albums, three EPs, and three commercial singles.

== Life and career ==
On November 25, 2013, IceJJFish released his debut single, "On the Floor". He released its music video on February 6, 2014, via YouTube. The video was produced and promoted by San Antonio-based entertainment company ThatRaw.com. "On the Floor" marked his breakthrough success in his career; its video received over 10 million views within a month and currently has over 91 million views. His unique style of poorly crafted music garnered him several titles from media outlets that year, such as "internet idol" and "internet sensation".

In 2014, IceJJFish made a guest appearance in Odd Future's Loiter Squad. In the episode he was included in, he created a song alongside Tyler, the Creator and Jasper Dolphin that was meant to troll hip hop. The song was titled "I Just Bought A Bugatti (I'm Happy)" and was applauded by critics for its humorous nature.

Later in 2015, IceJJFish would be featured in an episode of Nick Cannon's Wild N' Out. In the episode, he was involved in a rap competition with the show's regulars.

In the second half of the 2010s, IceJJFish would go on to feud with artists such as Lil Yachty, accusing musicians like him of copying his sound. He would go on to release an EP titled LilJJFish as a result, with its cover featuring McLoyd mimicking Yachty's appearance. IceJJFish then later went on to change his R&B sound to that of gospel, with the projects he released in 2019 reflecting that sound.

On October 5, 2022, IceJJFish announced on social media that he had gotten married.

== Discography ==
=== Studio albums ===
Title	Album details
Sea Sick	Released: March 1, 2019; Label: IceJJFish Entertainment; Format: Digital download
Emotions for You	Released: January 11, 2020; Label: IceJJFish Entertainment; Format: Digital download
Jesus Is the Way	Released: March 22, 2020; Label: IceJJFish Entertainment; Format: Digital download

=== EPs ===
Title	EP details
LilJJFish	Released: August 17, 2017; Label: IceJJFish Entertainment; Format: Digital download
My First Love	Released: May 3, 2019; Label: IceJJFish Entertainment; Format: Digital download
The Gospel	Released: November 28, 2019; Label: IceJJFish Entertainment; Format: Digital download

=== Singles ===
- "On the Floor" (2013)
- "Get Lost" (2017)
- "My Bae" (2017)
