= Earl (mixtape) =

Mixtape by Earl Sweatshirt
- Released: March 31, 2010
- Recorded: 2009–2010
- Studio: The Trap (Los Angeles)
- Genres: Alternative hip hop; horrorcore
- Length: 25:54
- Label: Self-released
- Producers: BeatBoy; Left Brain; Tyler, the Creator

Earl Sweatshirt chronology
Kitchen Cutlery (as Sly Tendencies) (2008)	Earl (2010)	Doris (2013)

Singles from Earl
- 1. "Earl" Released: July 26, 2010

Earl (stylized in all caps) is the second mixtape by American rapper Earl Sweatshirt. It was released as a free digital download on March 31, 2010, on the Odd Future website. This is Sweatshirt's first project to be released under his modern stage name; he previously started rapping under the stage name Sly Tendencies from 2008 to 2009.

== Background and lyrics ==
Earl is notable for its depraved and violent lyrics, which detail the fictional misadventures of the young Earl Sweatshirt, as he commits acts of murder, rape, kidnapping, and violence. The album features production by BrandenBeatBoy (credited as BeatBoy) and fellow Odd Future members Tyler, the Creator and Left Brain. The album features vocals from Tyler, the Creator, Vince Staples, Hodgy Beats, and some backing vocals from fellow Odd Future members Syd Tha Kyd and Taco Bennett. The lyrics featured on the album were written and recorded in 2009–2010, when Earl was 15–16 years old. The content present throughout the album includes various drug references, macabre themes of murder, rape and sexual lyrics.

On the title track, Earl, Tyler, and Taco rap about their distaste for 2DOPEBOYZ over frustrations the blog wouldn't publish Odd Future's music.

== Critical reception ==
Professional ratings
Review scores
Source	Rating
Pitchfork	8.3/10

Pitchfork Media called the album "mesmerizing". Pitchfork's sister site Altered Zones listed Earl as one of their top twenty albums of 2010, praising the album for its ferocity and for making "some of the most vile verses sound eloquent". Music site Gorilla vs. Bear listed it at number 12 in its list of the 30 best albums of 2010. Complex magazine rated Earl as the twenty-fourth best album of 2010.

=== Accolades ===
The mixtape was recognized as one of The 100 Best Albums of the Decade So Far, a list published by Pitchfork Media in August 2014.

== Track listing ==
All tracks produced by Tyler, the Creator, except where noted.

No.	Title	Writer(s)	Producer	Length
1.	"Thisniggaugly"	Thebe Kgositsile; Tyler Okonma; Travis Bennett		1:18
2.	"Earl"	Kgositsile; Okonma; T. Bennett		2:26
3.	"Couch" (featuring Ace Creator)	Kgositsile; Okonma		3:16
4.	"Kill"	Kgositsile; Okonma		2:20
5.	"Wakeupfaggot"	Kgositsile; Okonma; Sydney Bennett		0:42
6.	"Luper"	Kgositsile; Okonma		1:59
7.	"epaR" (featuring Vince Staples)	Kgositsile; Vyron Turner; Vincent Staples; Gerard Long	Left Brain	4:00
8.	"Moonlight" (featuring Hodgy Beats)	Kgositsile; Okonma; Long		2:04
9.	"Pigions" (featuring Wolf Haley)	Kgositsile; Okonma		3:33
10.	"Stapleton"	Kgositsile; Branden Martin	BeatBoy	4:16
Total length:				25:56

Notes

- "Thisniggaugly" and "Earl" feature additional vocals from Tyler, the Creator and Taco.
- "Wakeupfaggot" features additional vocals from Syd tha Kyd.
- "epaR" features additional vocals from Hodgy Beats.
- Tyler, the Creator is credited as 'Ace Creator' on "Couch," and as 'Wolf Haley' on "Pigions."

== Unauthorized Tidal & Amazon Music re-release ==
On April 6, 2015, Earl was re-released on music streaming services Tidal and Amazon Music. The updated track list combined most of the original tracks from Earl (excluding "Thisniggaugly" and "Wakeupfaggot") with tracks recorded prior to Earl, back when Sweatshirt went by the stage name Sly Tendencies. Other tracks include songs Sweatshirt featured on around the time of Earl. This is an unauthorized release from the company Classic Hits. Despite being available for purchase, most included songs were previously released for free.

=== Track listing ===
No.	Title	Producer(s)	Length
1.	"Stapleton"	BeatBoy	4:16
2.	"Earl"	Tyler, the Creator	2:27
3.	"Couch" (featuring Tyler, the Creator)	Tyler, the Creator	3:17
4.	"Kill"	Tyler, the Creator	2:21
5.	"Molliwopped"		1:43
6.	"Luper"	Tyler, the Creator	2:00
7.	"epaR" (featuring Vince Staples)	Left Brain	4:01
8.	"Moonlight" (featuring Hodgy Beats)	Tyler, the Creator	2:05
9.	"Deerskin"	Madlib	2:13
10.	"Orange Juice" (featuring Tyler, The Creator)	Bangladesh	3:51
11.	"Chordaroy" (featuring Tyler, the Creator and MellowHype)	Left Brain	5:01
12.	"Drop"	Cha Lo; Polow da Don	2:28
13.	"Mezmerized" (featuring Mylo)		2:48
14.	"Swag Me Out" (featuring Jasper, Odd Future, Wolf Gang and Tyler, the Creator)		7:18
15.	"Home"	James Pants	1:48
16.	"Brand New"		0:52
17.	"Blade"	DJ Khaled	1:24
18.	"Fuck This Christmas" (featuring Tyler, the Creator and Hodgy Beats)	Tyler, the Creator	4:31
19.	"WattStax"	Weird Eye	1:56
20.	"Pigions" (featuring Tyler, the Creator)	Tyler, the Creator	3:34
21.	"Dat Ass"		1:09
22.	"FYC" (featuring Gruzen)		3:56
23.	"Cool" (featuring Mike G)		2:27
24.	"CopKiller" (featuring Hodgy Beats)	Left Brain	1:24
25.	"Rebellious Shit"		2:16
26.	"Stones Throw"		1:14
27.	"Rick James"		1:58
28.	"Dat Ass (Remix)" (featuring Big L)		1:48
29.	"Number 4 (Instrumental)"		4:24

Notes

- The instrumental for "Deerskin" is originally the instrumental for "All Caps" by Madvillain, produced by Madlib.
- The instrumental for "Orange Juice" is originally the instrumental for "Lemonade" by Gucci Mane, produced by Bangladesh.
  - Hodgy Beats was mistakenly credited on the re-release's track list; Tyler, the Creator is the correct feature.
- "Chordaroy" was originally on MellowHype's 2010 mixtape BlackenedWhite.
- The instrumental for "Drop" is originally the instrumental for "Drop" by Rich Boy, produced by Cha Lo and Polow da Don.
- The instrumental for "Swag Me Out" is originally the instrumental for "Not a Stain on Me" by Big Tuck.
- "Home" was released as a standalone song on February 8, 2012, the day Sweatshirt returned from Samoa, and the instrumental for it is originally the song "Theme From Paris" by James Pants.
- The instrumental for "Blade" is originally the instrumental for "Nothing's Gonna Stop Me" by Terror Squad, produced by DJ Khaled.
- "Rick James" was mistakenly released as an Earl Sweatshirt song. The song is actually titled "BADBOI222" and was released by Long Island rapper "BIG BREAKFAST".
