= I Smell Panties =

American comedy hip-hop duo

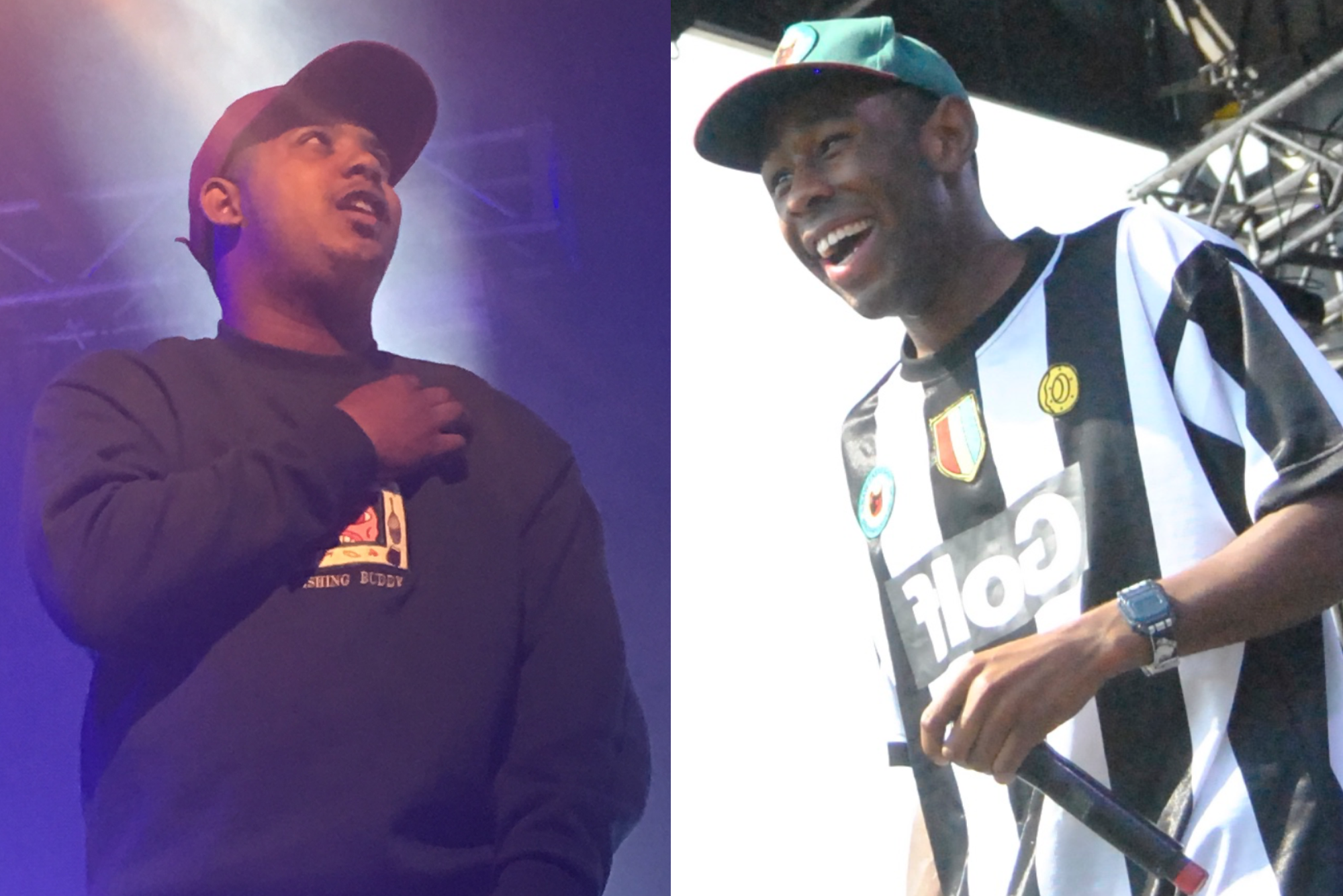
- Both members in 2016

Background information
- Origin: Los Angeles, California, U.S.
- Genre: Comedy hip hop
- Years active: 2007–2008
- Spinoff of: Odd Future
- Past members: Tyler, the Creator; Jasper Dolphin
- Website: oddfuture.com

I Smell Panties was an American comedy hip hop duo from Los Angeles, California, that consisted of Tyler, the Creator and Jasper Dolphin.

== History ==
Tyler, the Creator and Jasper Dolphin were founding members of the Los Angeles hip hop collective Odd Future, founded in 2007. They released their only EP, I Smell Panties, on June 28, 2008. They were featured on the song "Lisa" off Odd Future's debut mixtape, The Odd Future Tape.

They have not released material together as I Smell Panties since The Odd Future Tape in 2008.

== Discography ==
=== Extended plays ===
- I Smell Panties (2008)
