= Bastard (Tyler, the Creator album) =

Studio album by Tyler, the Creator
- Released: December 25, 2009
- Recorded: November 2008 –September 2009
- Studio: The Trap (Los Angeles)
- Genres: Alternative hip-hop; horrorcore
- Length: 55:50
- Label: Self-released
- Producers: Tyler, the Creator

Tyler, the Creator chronology
Bastard (2009)	Goblin (2011)

Alternate cover

Singles from Bastard
- 1. "Pigs Fly (originally for Dinosaur)" Released: April 3, 2009; 2. "Jack and the Beanstalk" Released: April 7, 2009; 3. "Seven" Released: July 2, 2009; 4. "VCR" Released: December 4, 2009

Bastard is the debut studio album (Note: Sources differ in labeling Bastard as an album or mixtape. Although the project was released for free and aligned with the characteristics of a mixtape, Tyler referred to it as an album.) by American rapper Tyler, the Creator. It was self-released on December 25, 2009, on Odd Future's website. Tyler promoted the album on the Hypebeast forums. The album features guest appearances from various fellow Odd Future members, including Casey Veggies, Hodgy Beats, Syd the Kyd, Domo Genesis, Earl Sweatshirt, Brandun DeShay, Mike G, Jasper Dolphin, and Taco. Upon its release, the album was positively received by music critics and made several best-of lists, including Pitchfork's "100 Greatest Hip-Hop Albums of All Time" list.

Bastard was supported by four singles: "Pigs Fly", "Jack and the Beanstalk", "Seven", and "VCR". "VCR", "Bastard" & "French!" received official music videos. (Note: The videos for "French!" and "VCR" were published on Odd Future's YouTube channel, while the video for "Bastard" was released on a separate channel.)

== Concept and content ==
The songs were written and recorded by Tyler from 2007 through 2009, and released on December 25, 2009. Originally, the album was entitled Dinosaur and was meant to be released in March 2009. Tyler produced most of the album using GarageBand, Logic Pro, Reason Studios, and FL Studio. In 2019, he recalled that some of his influences for the album were Eminem's Relapse (2009), James Pants' Seven Seals (2009), Nite Jewel's Good Evening (2009), Grizzly Bear's Veckatimest (2009), Clipse's Hell Hath No Fury (2006), and the music of the Cool Kids. Bastard features Tyler speaking to a character named Dr. TC, who acts as Tyler's therapist and guidance counselor. The title track contains Dr. TC hinting that the album would be the first of three therapy sessions. Both songs "Odd Toddlers" and "Slow It Down" were previously released on The Odd Future Tape (2008). "Jack and the Beanstalk" was previously released on Hypetrack's mixtape "Hype Club" as "Jacknthebeasnaslak 2"

On December 25, 2010, one year after the album's initial release, Bastard was re-released with Brandun DeShay's verse on "Session" being replaced with a verse from Mike G, due to a dissension between Tyler and DeShay. The project was available on Odd Future's online music store before being removed from the website, with DeShay's vocals returning to that same track. Tyler later announced plans on re-releasing Bastard in a remastered physical form through Odd Future Records. However, since this announcement, nothing has materialized. (Note: A physical vinyl appeared at certain shows during Chromakopia: The World Tour.)

== Reception and controversy ==
Professional ratings
Review scores
Source	Rating
Cokemachineglow	74%
RapReviews	5/10

Bastard was met with much praise from critics. Pitchfork called it "a minor masterpiece of shock art" and one of the first great Odd Future-related projects, noting the thrilling juxtaposition between humorous and hateful lines. RapReviews praised the innovative production and Tyler's rapping skills but viewed the lyrics as unacceptable, calling the "frequent references to rape ... a deal-breaker". It was ranked at number 32 on Pitchfork's list of "The Top 50 Albums of 2010", with the single "French!" being ranked at number 61 on their list of "Top 100 Tracks of 2010". The album was later ranked number 118 on Rolling Stone's 2022 list of "The 200 Greatest Hip-Hop Albums of All Time" and number 38 on Complex's 2018 list of "The 50 Best Rapper Mixtapes".

Bastard, alongside Tyler's second album, Goblin (2011), caused controversy among members of the Conservative Party in the United Kingdom, which led to Theresa May, who was Home Secretary at the time, imposing a ban on Tyler from entering the country for three to five years. The ban was met with uproar, which was revisited when May became Prime Minister of the United Kingdom. Tyler and many of his fans believe the ban was racially motivated, with Tyler stating he felt he was being treated "like a terrorist", and that they did not like the fact that their children were idolizing a black man. The ban was lifted in May 2019.

In the album's title track, the first words Tyler says are cursing 2DopeBoyz, NahRight, and other blogs who Tyler viewed as snubbing him early in his career. After several attacks on different tracks in the following years, 2DopeBoyz founders Joel Zela and Meka Udoh addressed Tyler's comments in a February 17, 2011, post, claiming they weren't even aware of him as an artist until he started insulting them in interviews and on tracks. They said they never received music from Tyler or Odd Future and they would not work with him in the future, calling Tyler's outrage a marketing ploy.

== Track listing ==
All songs were produced by Tyler, the Creator.

Bastard track listing
No.	Title	Writer(s)	Length
1.	"Bastard"	Tyler Okonma	6:09
2.	"Seven"	Okonma	3:29
3.	"Odd Toddlers" (featuring Casey Veggies)	Okonma; Casey Jones	3:36
4.	"French!" (featuring Hodgy Beats)	Okonma; Gerard Long	4:03
5.	"Blow"	Okonma	2:55
6.	"Pigs Fly" (featuring Domo Genesis)	Okonma; Dominique Cole	3:35
7.	"Parade"	Okonma	2:23
8.	"Slow It Down" (featuring Hodgy Beats)	Okonma; Long	3:08
9.	"AssMilk" (featuring Earl Sweatshirt)	Okonma; Thebe Kgositsile	3:40
10.	"VCR / Wheels"	Okonma	3:28
11.	"Session" (featuring Hodgy Beats, Brandun DeShay, and Mike G)	Okonma; Long; Brandun DeShay; Michael "Mike G" Griffin II	3:35
12.	"Sarah"	Okonma	4:47
13.	"Jack and the Beanstalk"	Okonma; Long; Shawn Carter	3:51
14.	"Tina" (featuring Jasper Dolphin and Taco)	Okonma; Davon Wilson; Travis Bennett	3:07
15.	"Inglorious"	Okonma	4:05
Total length:			55:50

Notes

- "Blow" contains additional vocals from Syd tha Kyd and the instrumental was used for Skoolie300's mixtape "After Skool Volume: 1"
- On December 25, 2010, one year after the album's initial release, it was re-released with Brandun DeShay's verse on "Session" replaced by a verse from Mike G. However, in 2012, the album was re-uploaded to the official Odd Future website with both DeShay and Mike G credited on the song.
- "VCR" contains uncredited vocals from Earl Sweatshirt.
- "Inglorious" contains uncredited vocals from Hodgy Beats.

Sample credits

- "Seven" contains a sample from "The Sweetest Pain", as performed by Dexter Wansel, which was included in a pack of samples in Propellerhead Reason.
- "Odd Toddlers" contains a sample from "One Beer" by MF Doom, which both sample "Huit Octobre 1971", as performed by Cortex.
- "Jack and the Beanstalk" contains a vocal sample from "What More Can I Say", as performed by Jay-Z.
