= Yonkers (song) =

Single by Tyler, the Creator

from the album Goblin
- Released: February 14, 2011
- Recorded: 2010
- Genre: Horrorcore; alternative hip-hop
- Length: 4:11
- Label: XL
- Songwriter: Tyler Okonma
- Producers: Tyler, the Creator

Tyler, the Creator singles chronology
"Sandwitches" (2010)	"Yonkers" (2011)	"She" (2011)

Music video
- "Yonkers" on YouTube

"Yonkers" is a song written, produced, and performed by American rapper and producer Tyler, the Creator, released digitally as the second single from his second album, Goblin on February 14, 2011, through XL Recordings. It was recorded in 2010 and written and produced by Tyler himself. Upon its release, it would receive controversy due to its violent lyrics and numerous disses, although it was critically acclaimed and landed on numerous year-end lists. Tyler also directed a music video for the single, which received positive critical reception and earned him the MTV Video Music Award for Best New Artist at the 2011 MTV Video Music Awards. Numerous publications have considered "Yonkers" to be Tyler's breakout song.

== Background and inspiration ==
The song is named after Yonkers, New York. Tyler claimed to have created the beat in eight minutes as a parody of stereotypical 1990s New York hip hop:

Dude, niggas don't know that that beat was made as a joke. I was trying to make a shitty New York beat and we was just rapping like we was from New York like we were retarded. And then, I just had some random verses and I was just like; "I'll just record it to this beat, this beat is kinda cool." And then niggas really liked it. That's so nuts, because that shit was actually a fucking joke. I made that beat in literally eight minutes.

== Composition and lyrics ==
"Yonkers"
A 23-second sample from "Yonkers" that showcases Okonma's transgressive lyrics over a minimalistic beat.

Tyler disses numerous musicians in the song, most notably Hayley Williams, B.o.B, and Bruno Mars. He also dissed Mars in The Game's song "Martians vs. Goblins". In response, B.o.B released a diss track titled "No Future" in reference to Tyler's rap group Odd Future. Tyler praised the song and claimed that he did not initially think it was a diss track. In response to the line "stab Bruno Mars in his goddamn esophagus", Mars said, "Tyler has to wait in line if he wants to stab me... he's definitely not the first guy that's said something like that to me and he's not going to be the last." Rapper Capital Steez sampled the song in his song "Negus", using the same opening line, "I'm a fucking walking paradox."

== Critical reception ==
"Yonkers" received critical acclaim. Pitchfork awarded it with the "Best New Music" award, stating that it is "not only the best thing any Odd Future affiliate has produced to date, it's also the perfect distillation of what they do well". The Guardian named it the third best song of 2011. Claire Suddath of Time named "Yonkers" the eighth best song of 2011, describing it as "minimalistic rap" and "a piece of performance art", concluding that it "creates a thrilling sense of uneasiness that the music world hadn't seen since the early days of punk". Pigeons and Planes named the single the 21st best song of 2011. XXL named it the 22nd best song of 2011, noting that the song, video, and Tyler's performance of "Sandwitches" on Late Night with Jimmy Fallon propelled him to stardom. Rolling Stone named the song the 23rd best song of 2011, stating that Tyler "stabs Bruno Mars and disses Jesus [...] somehow, all the bad vibes are mesmerizing".

== Commercial performance ==
In the United States, the single peaked at number 2 on the Bubbling Under Hot 100 chart. It would also chart at number 9 on the Heatseekers Songs chart and number 27 on the R&B/Hip-Hop Digital Songs chart. It would later be certified Platinum by the Recording Industry Association of America (RIAA) for equivalent sales of 1,000,000 units in the United States. In the United Kingdom, the single charted at number 15 on the Indie Breakers chart and was certified Silver by the British Phonographic Industry (BPI) for equivalent sales of 200,000 units in the country. In Canada, although the single did not chart, it was certified Platinum by Music Canada (MC) for equivalent sales of 80,000 units in the country.

== Music video ==
=== Background and synopsis ===
Tyler holding a cockroach in the official music video

The music video for "Yonkers", directed by Tyler, was released via Odd Future's YouTube channel on February 10, 2011. Shot in black-and-white using a perspective control lens, the video features Tyler performing the song on a chair in a blank room while handling and later eating a cockroach, which causes him to vomit. The word "kill" is seen on his hand, along with a St. Peter's cross. The video concludes with Tyler taking off his shirt, realizing that his nose has started bleeding, and hanging himself. The video excludes the third and final verse as the version with this verse was not released until four days after the video. The full song, however, was included on the album.

=== Reception ===
Upon its release, the music video would go viral. On February 23, 2011, fellow American rapper Kanye West stated on Twitter that he thought the "Yonkers" video was the best of 2011. The video earned Tyler the Best New Artist award at the 2011 MTV Video Music Awards, as well as a nomination for Video of the Year.

== In other media ==
The song was featured in the soundtrack to the video game Saints Row: The Third.

== Track listing ==
Yonkers was written and produced by Tyler, the Creator (T. Okonma).

Digital download
No.	Title	Length
1.	"Yonkers"	4:11

Promo CD
No.	Title	Length
1.	"Yonkers" (radio edit)	4:12
2.	"Yonkers"	4:12
Total length:		8:24

== Charts ==
Chart performance
Chart (2011)	Peak position
UK Indie Breakers (OCC)	15
US Bubbling Under Hot 100 (Billboard)	2
US Heatseekers Songs (Billboard)	9
US R&B/Hip-Hop Digital Songs (Billboard)	27

== Certifications ==
Region	Certification	Certified units/sales
Canada (Music Canada)	Platinum	80,000^{‡}
United Kingdom (BPI)	Silver	200,000^{‡}
United States (RIAA)	Platinum	1,000,000^{‡}
^{‡} Sales+streaming figures based on certification alone.
