= Okra (song) =

Single by Tyler, the Creator

Single by Tyler, the Creator
- Released: March 29, 2018
- Genre: Alternative hip hop
- Length: 2:31
- Label: Columbia
- Songwriter: Tyler Okonma
- Producers: Tyler, the Creator

Tyler, the Creator singles chronology
"After the Storm" (2018)	"Okra" (2018)	"435" (2018)

Music video
- "Okra" on YouTube

"Okra" (stylized as "OKRA") is a song by American hip hop artist Tyler, the Creator, released as a digital single on March 29, 2018. It was written and produced by Tyler, the Creator. Described by Tyler as a "throwaway song", the single garnered media attention for its abrupt release and a lyrical reference to American actor Timothée Chalamet. "Okra" has been described as a rap song with bass, drums, snare, piano, and strings in its instrumentation, with its production complementing Tyler's vocal performance, which was shifted up one semitone. In the lyrics, Tyler makes references to several pop culture figures in addition to Chalamet, and also alludes to the separation of hip hop collective Odd Future, which Tyler co-founded.

The song was praised for Tyler's production, lyricism, and rapping. The song debuted at number 89 on the Billboard Hot 100 with 6.2 million streams, marking Tyler's third appearance on the chart and his second as a solo artist, following 2017's "Who Dat Boy". The song also debuted on the Canadian Hot 100 at number 70. A music video, directed by Tyler under the pseudonym Wolf Haley, was released simultaneously with the single.

== Background and release ==
"Okra" was released with no prior announcement on March 29, 2018, following a series of Twitter posts from Tyler, the Creator explaining that the song had been recorded in January 2018 before a tour with Vince Staples, and that he decided to "just put it out for fun and move on with [his] life". The release was considered by several news outlets to be a surprise. Tyler referred to the track a "throwaway song" and posted that he would "promote this song for the next 5 days, then continue to live a normal life". He shared the lyrics to the song later that day. The song is the second in a string of solo tracks released following his fourth studio album Flower Boy, preceded by the August 2017 release of "Ziploc", a freestyle rap over the instrumental of "4:44" by Jay-Z.

== Composition and lyrical interpretation ==
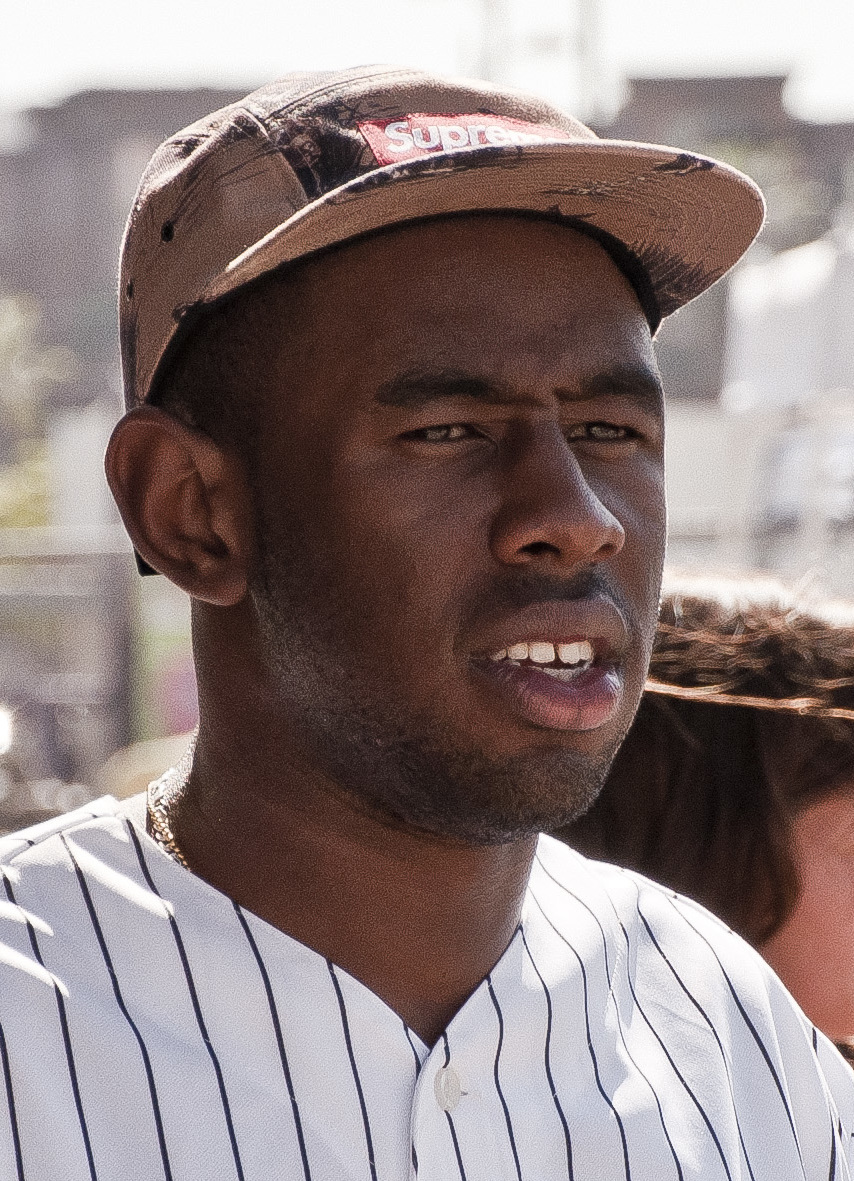
Tyler, the Creator is the lone songwriter, producer, and performer on "Okra"

"Okra" lasts for a duration of 2:31 (two minutes and thirty-one seconds), and was written and produced by Tyler, the Creator. Neal Pogue, Mike Bozzi, and Vic Wainstein contributed mix, master, and record engineering, respectively. The track has a "minimalist" and "trippy" beat, described as "mostly bass and snare with flashes of piano and strings" by Pitchfork's Sheldon Pearce and "a relentless bass drone, an eerie piano hook and strings" by Jon Blistein of Rolling Stone. Charles Holmes of MTV commented on the "bass-rattling production", Billboard's Rania Aniftos referred to the track as a "bass-heavy tune", and Phil Witmer of Noisey noted "Tyler's signature piano flourishes sprinkled throughout".

Tyler opens the song saying that he recorded it in one take. His vocal flow has been compared to Valee's verse on the Z-Money song "Two-16's", The lyrics make reference to several topics and individuals, including his nomination for Best Rap Album at the 60th Annual Grammy Awards, actresses Mary-Kate and Ashley Olsen, films Taxi Driver and Django Unchained, television sitcom The Fresh Prince of Bel-Air, hip hop group G-Unit, basketball player Metta World Peace, and the divorce of actor Nick Cannon and singer Mariah Carey. The song also alludes to the dissolution of hip hop collective Odd Future, which was co-founded by Tyler. Luke Morgan Britton of NME specifically refers to the chorus lyrics "Man, now they go / I cut off some friends, where they go" as an allusion to the group's separation, while Holmes drew attention to the lyric "Golf be the set, no more OF". Pearce described the lyrical content as being "part Grammy celebration, part Odd Future send-off, part shameless ego-booster, and all impulse-driven".

Several media outlets, including Pitchfork, Billboard, XXL, MTV, Noisey, The Fader, NME, and Spin noted the lyric "Tell Tim Chalamet to come get at me" in the third verse, with Zack Sharf of Indiewire saying that the reference to the American actor "instantly set the internet abuzz". Chalamet acknowledged the reference days after the song's release, reposting an Internet meme relating to the lyric.

== Commercial and critical reception ==
"Okra" is Tyler, the Creator's second solo single to chart on the Billboard Hot 100, following "Who Dat Boy". The single debuted at number 89 (6.2 million streams) in the issue dated April 14, 2018. In addition to the Hot 100, "Okra" charted on Billboard's Digital Songs at number 48 and Hot R&B/Hip-Hop Songs at number 42. The song also charted on the Canadian Hot 100, debuting at number 70 in the issue dated April 14, 2018.

Sheldon Pearce of Pitchfork described "Okra" as a "punchline-heavy slapper", saying that "Tyler raps like he's doing donuts through his own imagination" and praising the lyrics as "his most formidable raps in some time". Phil Witmer of Noisey called the song as "a simple, straightforward banger" and praised the "instantly quotable" lyrics.

== Music video ==
The music video for "Okra" was directed by Tyler, the Creator under the pseudonym Wolf Haley, and was produced by Happy Place. Edited using split screen imagery, the clip begins with close-ups of Tyler's face paired with "a shot of the rapper in an idyllic field", and shows him "both outside and inside a mysterious venue". Further imagery shows Tyler "rapping in a park, riding bikes and hanging out in a living room, all shot in hyper-color blacklight tints" before the video concludes in "a blinding, strob-lit [sic] sequence" with Tyler dressed in yellow reflective workwear and "lustrous chains, which hold colorful diamond smiley face, cat, and flower pendants". The clip features a prominent close-up of a pair of silver Converse x Golf le Fleur, Tyler's signature model of the Converse One Star. As of April 2018, a silver version of these shoes are not available for purchase.

== Credits and personnel ==
Credits adapted from Tidal.

- Tyler, the Creator – composition, production, vocals
- Neal Pogue – mix engineering
- Mike Bozzi – master engineering
- Vic Wainstein – record engineering

== Charts ==
Chart (2018)	Peak position
Canada Hot 100 (Billboard)	70
New Zealand Heatseekers (RMNZ)	5
US Billboard Hot 100	89
US Hot R&B/Hip-Hop Songs (Billboard)	42

== Certifications ==
Region	Certification	Certified units/sales
Canada (Music Canada)	Gold	40,000^{‡}
United States (RIAA)	Gold	500,000^{‡}
^{‡} Sales+streaming figures based on certification alone.

== Release history ==
Region	Date	Format	Label
United States	March 29, 2018	Digital download	Columbia
Australia	March 30, 2018	Digital download	Columbia
Belgium	March 30, 2018	Digital download	Columbia
Canada	March 30, 2018	Digital download	Columbia
Finland	March 30, 2018	Digital download	Columbia
Germany	March 30, 2018	Digital download	Columbia
New Zealand	March 30, 2018	Digital download	Columbia
Portugal	March 30, 2018	Digital download	Columbia
Spain	March 30, 2018	Digital download	Columbia
Switzerland	March 30, 2018	Digital download	Columbia
United Kingdom	March 30, 2018	Digital download	Columbia
