= James Pants =

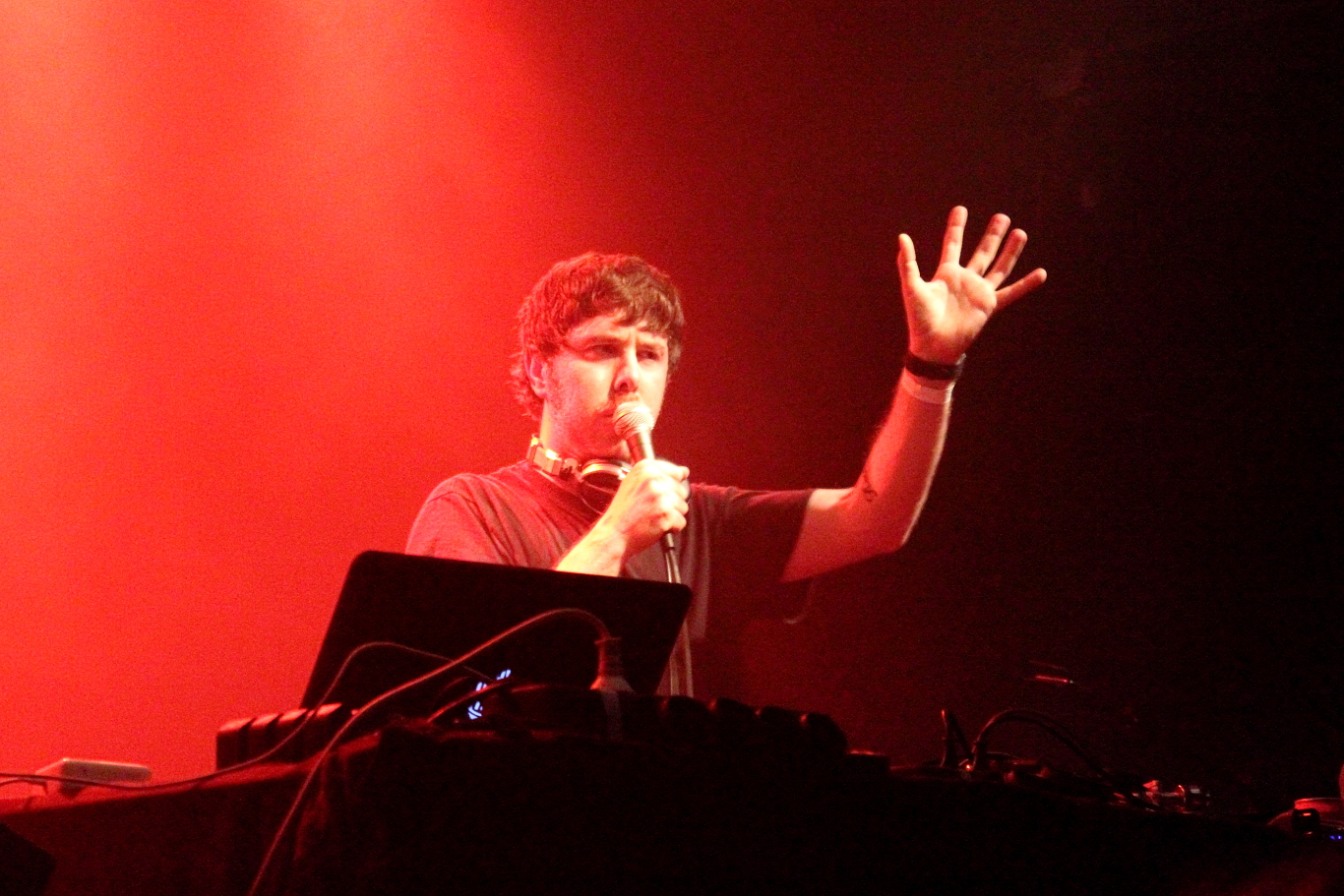
- James Pants at Poitiers, 2011

Background information
- Born: James Singleton
- Genres: Hip hop; R&B; soul; boogie; electro; new wave; disco; electronica; post-punk; noise rock
- Occupations: Multi-instrumentalist; recording artist
- Years active: 2006–present
- Label: Stones Throw
- Website: www.stonesthrow.com/jamespants

James Singleton, known professionally as James Pants, is an American multi-instrumental recording artist. Although his music defies simple categorization, he is promoted as a purveyor of the "fresh beat," an early-1980s sound with influences from 1980s soul, electro boogie, early rap, new wave, and post-punk disco.

== Early life ==
Singleton's father is a Presbyterian minister and he has lived in Texas, Boston, and Spokane.

Singleton used to be in a rap group called Ballistix in Austin, Texas.

Singleton was discovered by DJ and Stones Throw Records head Peanut Butter Wolf, whom he approached while still in high school. When Peanut Butter Wolf did a gig in his hometown of Austin, Texas, Pants left his prom, with his date in tow, to meet him at the show.

== Career ==
Singleton interned at Stones Throw offices. After releasing several singles and compilations with Stones Throw, he released his debut album, Welcome, in 2008. The second James Pants LP, Seven Seals, was released in July 2009; his third, self-titled LP was released on May 3, 2011, and his fourth LP, Savage, was released on April 14, 2015.

Singleton currently resides in New York City and works as a software engineer for Bloomberg L.P. He is affiliated with the Red Bull Music Academy.

== Discography ==
=== Albums ===
- Welcome, CD, 2008 Stones Throw Records
- Seven Seals, CD, 2009 Stones Throw Records
- James Pants, CD, 2011 Stones Throw Records
- Savage, CD, 2015 Stones Throw Records

=== EPs ===
- James Pants Meets Egyptian Lover, 2009 Stones Throw Records (split 12 with Egyptian Lover)
- New Tropical, 2010 Stones Throw Records
