= Travis Bennett =

American actor, rapper, and DJ (born 1994)

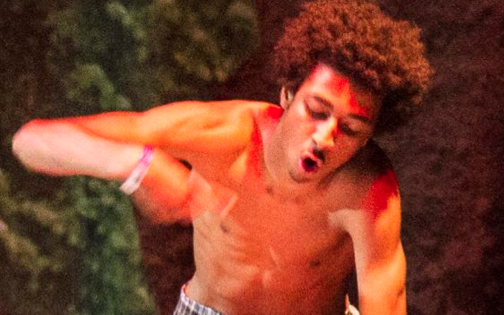
- Travis “Taco” Bennett performing in 2012.
- Born: May 16, 1994 (age 32); California, U.S.
- Other names: Taco; Yung Taco; Taco Bennett
- Occupations: Actor; DJ; hype man; rapper; fashion designer
- Family: Syd (sister)
- Musical career
- Origin: California, U.S.
- Formerly of: Odd Future

Travis Bennett (born May 16, 1994) is an American actor, rapper, DJ, and member of the music collective Odd Future. He gained recognition under the alias Taco during his tenure with Odd Future and later transitioned into acting, known for his role as Elz in the FXX comedy series Dave.

== Early life ==
Travis Bennett was born on May 16, 1994, in California. He is the younger brother of Syd. Growing up, Bennett was into basketball, riding bikes, and video games. He met Tyler, the Creator, real name Tyler Okonma, when Travis was just 12 years old, and Okonma would start recording music at Bennett's house a few years later. In 2007, Bennett joined the music collective Odd Future.

== Career ==
Bennett embarked on his career as a DJ and hype man for the Odd Future collective, contributing to live performances and projects like the Adult Swim series Loiter Squad.

=== Transition to acting ===
Transitioning from his career with Odd Future, Bennett ventured into acting. He gained recognition for his part as Elz in the FX comedy series Dave, portraying the childhood friend and music producer of the main character, Dave Burd, also known as Lil Dicky. This marked his initial steps into the world of acting. Subsequently, Bennett made an appearance as the son of Eddie Murphy's character in the movie You People.

== Filmography ==
=== Television ===
Year	Title	Role	Notes
2011	Workaholics	Himself	Episode: "Heist School"
2012–2014	Loiter Squad	Various	Main cast Also co-creator, writer and producer
2017–2019	The Jellies!	Various voices	
2020	The Eric Andre Show	Himself	Episode: "Hannibal Quits"
2020–2023	Dave	Elz	Main cast 25 episodes
2023	History of the World, Part II	Ahmed	Episode: "IV"

=== Films ===
Year	Title	Role	Notes
2022	Jackass Forever	Himself	Cameo
2022	Confess, Fletch	Breez	
2023	You People	Omar	
2024	Junk	Brian	
2025	California King	Perry	

=== Music videos ===
Title	Year	Role	Notes
"Bastard" (Tyler, the Creator)	2010	None	Director; Co-directed by Wolf Haley
"French!" (Tyler, the Creator)	2010	None	Director; Co-directed by Wolf Haley
"VCR" (Tyler, the Creator)	2010	None	Director; Co-directed by Wolf Haley
"Bitch Suck Dick" (Tyler, the Creator featuring Jasper Dolphin and Taco)	2011	Himself	
"Gucci Gucci" (Kreayshawn)	2011	Himself	
"Fastlane" (The Internet)	2012	Carnival Goer	
"Oldie" (Odd Future)	2012	Himself	
"Domo23" (Tyler, the Creator)	2013	Himself	
"Fucking Young" (Tyler, the Creator)	2015	Himself	

== Discography ==
=== Featured songs ===
List of songs as a featured artist
Title	Year	Artist(s)	Album
"Tina" (featuring Jasper Dolphin and Taco)	2009	Tyler, the Creator	Bastard
"B.S.D." (featuring Jasper Dolphin and Taco)	2011	Tyler, the Creator	Goblin
"Real Bitch" (featuring MellowHype and Taco)	2012	Odd Future	The OF Tape Vol. 2
"We Got Bitches" (featuring Tyler, the Creator, Taco and Jasper Dolphin)	2012	Odd Future	The OF Tape Vol. 2
"Oldie"	2012	Odd Future	The OF Tape Vol. 2
"Trashwang" (featuring Na-Kel Smith, Jasper Dolphin, Lucas, L-Boy, Taco, Left Brain, and Lee Spielman)	2013	Tyler, the Creator	Wolf

=== Other appearances ===
List of songs where Taco provided additional vocals
Title	Year	Artist(s)	Album
"Radicals"	2011	Tyler, the Creator	Goblin
"Nightmare"	2011	Tyler, the Creator	Goblin
