= Jasper Dolphin =

American rapper and television personality (born 1990)

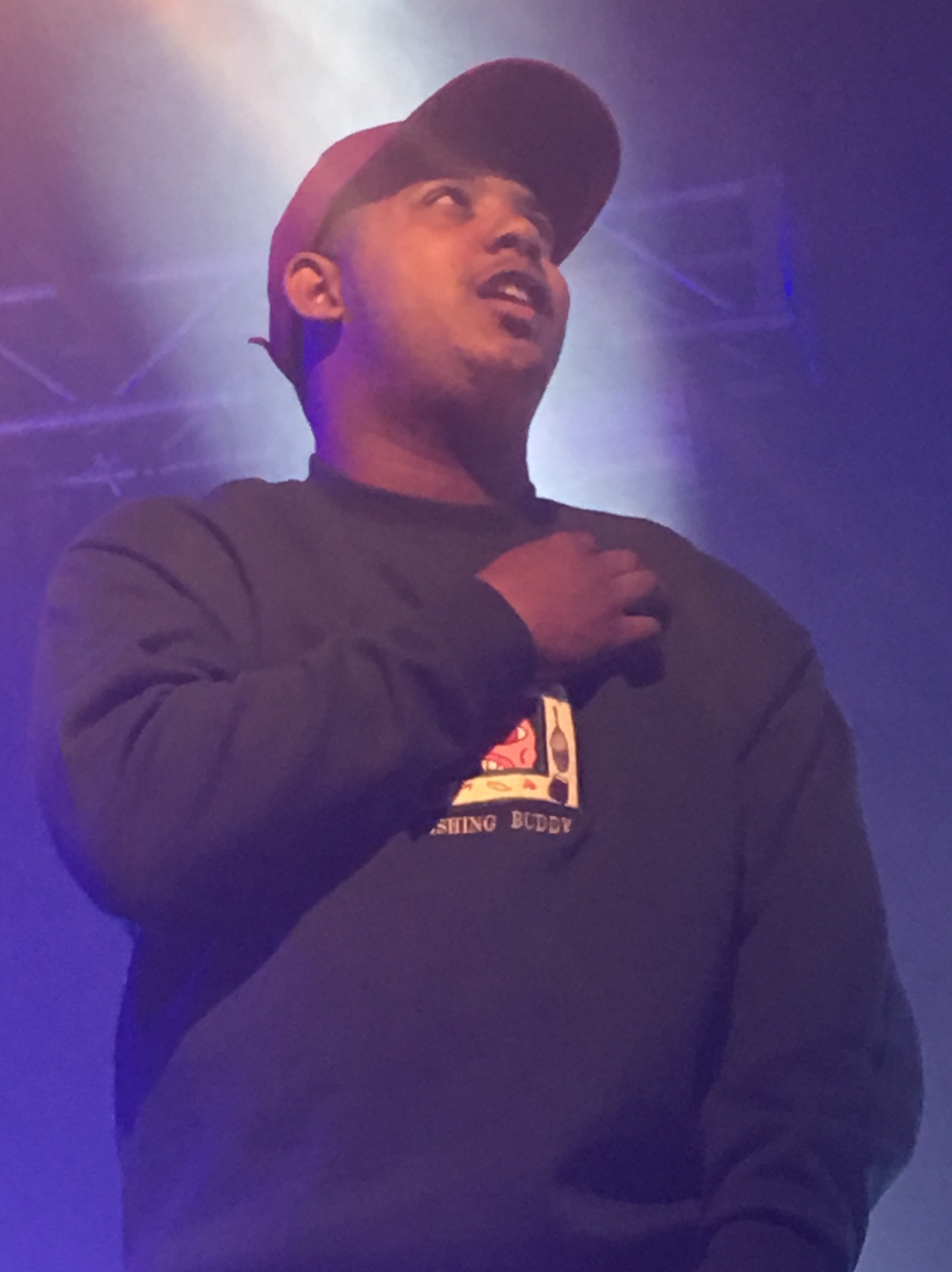
- Wilson in 2016
- Born: Davon Lamar Wilson; September 28, 1990 (age 36); Los Angeles, California, U.S.
- Other names: Jasper; Demonté; Bon Bon
- Occupations: Television personality; actor; stunt performer; rapper
- Years active: 2007–present
- Musical career
- Genre: Comedy hip-hop
- Instrument: Vocals
- Formerly of: Odd Future; I Smell Panties

Davon Lamar Wilson (born September 28, 1990), better known as Jasper Dolphin (or simply Jasper), is an American television personality, stunt performer, and former rapper. He is best known for being a founding member of the hip-hop collective Odd Future, but has since ventured further into his career in acting. He became a new cast member of the reality comedy franchise Jackass and was featured in Jackass Forever (2022), Jackass 4.5 (2022), and Jackass: Best and Last (2026).

== Career ==
=== 2007–2010: Formation of Odd Future ===
Jasper Dolphin was a founding member of the Los Angeles hip-hop collective Odd Future, founded in 2007. In 2008, he formed the Odd Future subgroup I Smell Panties with fellow Odd Future member and leader Tyler the Creator. They released their debut project, the I Smell Panties EP, on June 28, 2008. Jasper rapped on "Lisa" off Odd Future's debut mixtape, The Odd Future Tape, released in November 2008.

Jasper was featured on the track "Tina" off Tyler the Creator's debut mixtape, Bastard, released on December 25, 2009. It also featured Odd Future member Taco. Jasper rapped on "Double Cheeseburger", "Round and Round", and "Swag Me Out" off Odd Future's second mixtape, Radical, released on May 7, 2010. He was also featured on the track "Deaddeputy" off MellowHype's debut studio album, BlackenedWhite, released on October 31, 2010.

=== 2011–2014: Odd Future rise and early TV career ===
Jasper was featured on the track "Bitch Suck Dick" off Tyler the Creator's debut studio album, Goblin, released May 10, 2011. On June 19, 2011, the track "Thisniggaaintfunnyatall", by Tyler the Creator featuring Jasper Dolphin and Taco, was leaked. On September 8, 2011, it was announced that Odd Future would be making a television show called Loiter Squad. The show was announced to be a sketch comedy show featuring various skits and pranks, and originally aired on March 25, 2012, on Adult Swim. The show features Jasper, along with Odd Future members Tyler the Creator, Taco, L-Boy, and Earl Sweatshirt as main cast members with other members of Odd Future making cameo appearances. The program was produced by Dickhouse Productions, which also is the production company for Jackass. Jasper also rapped on the tracks "We Got Bitches" and "Oldie" off Odd Future's debut studio album, The OF Tape Vol. 2.

Jasper was featured on the track "Trashwang" off Tyler the Creator's second studio album, Wolf (2013). It also featured Na'kel, Lucas, L-Boy, Taco, Left Brain, and Lee Spielman of Trash Talk. Jasper continued to be a regular cast member of Loiter Squad in Season 2, premiered on March 10, 2013, and Season 3, premiered May 15, 2014. Jasper, credited as Demonté, was featured on Tyler the Creator gangster rap alter-ego's, Young Nigga's, song "I Just Bought a Bugatti (I'm Happy)", released on June 6, 2014. It also featured IceJJFish.

=== 2017–present: Further TV appearances and Jackass ===
In 2017, GOLF Media announced a show on their now-deleted app with Jasper as the lead role, titled Quality Time with Jasper. Viewers have compared the show to The Eric Andre Show.

In 2019, it was announced Jasper was having a show with an Odd Future friend, Errol Chatham, on the channel Viceland. The show focuses on the two having their first time doing activities that they have never done before. They both also appeared in one episode of Ridiculousness in 2019.

In 2021, it was announced that Jasper, along with four other people, will be the new cast members in Jackass Forever (2022). Jasper's dad Compston "Dark Shark" Wilson, and fellow Odd Future members Tyler the Creator, Errol Chatham, Lionel Boyce, Syd, and Travis "Taco" Bennett also appeared in this movie.

Jasper also appeared in the Jackass Shark Week special with Johnny Knoxville, Steve-O, Chris Pontius, and Poopies, who is also a new cast member in Jackass Forever. He also appeared in the second Jackass Shark Week special (2022) with Knoxville, Pontius, Wee Man, Poopies, Zach Holmes, and Jasper's dad Dark Shark. Jasper made a guest appearance in the YouTube web series Truth or Dab in the episode starring fellow Jackass Forever cast members Wee Man and Steve-O.

He made a guest appearance in WWE SmackDown with fellow Jackass members Knoxville, Pontius, Dave England, new member Zach, and director Jeff Tremaine. He helped Knoxville beat Sami Zayn in WrestleMania 38. He also appeared in an episode of Celebrity Family Feud, along with most of the main cast of Jackass Forever.

He also appeared in Jackass: Best and Last, alongside the entire main cast of Jackass Forever. It was theatrically released on June 26, 2026.

== Discography ==
=== with Odd Future ===
Studio albums

- The OF Tape Vol. 2 (2012)

Mixtapes

- The Odd Future Tape (2008)
- Radical (2010)

=== with Tyler the Creator, as I Smell Panties ===
Extended plays

- I Smell Panties (2008)

=== Guest appearances ===
List of non-single guest appearances, with other performing artists, showing year released and album name
Title	Year	Other artist(s)	Album
"Tina"	2009	Tyler the Creator, Taco	Bastard
"Deaddeputy"	2010	MellowHype	BlackenedWhite
"Bitch Suck Dick"	2011	Tyler the Creator, Taco	Goblin
"Thisniggaaintfunnyatall"	2011	Tyler the Creator, Taco	non-album single
"Trashwang"	2013	Tyler the Creator, Na'kel, Lucas, L-Boy, Taco, Left Brain, Lee Spielman	Wolf
"I Just Bought a Bugatti (I'm Happy)"	2014	Young Nigga, IceJJFish	non-album single

== Filmography ==
=== Television ===
Year	Title	Role	Notes
2011	When I Was 17	Himself	Episode 3.2
2011	OFWGKTA Smackfest	Himself	2 episodes
2011	2011 MTV Video Music Awards	Himself	Presenter
2012–2014	Loiter Squad	Various	Series regular 31 episodes Producer
2013	Mac Miller and the Most Dope Family	Himself	Episode 1.6; TV series documentary
2017–2019	The Jellies!	Various	Series regular 20 episodes Associate producer
2019	Jasper & Errol's First Time	Himself	Series regular 9 episodes
2019	Ridiculousness	Himself	Episode 15.37
2019	Nuts + Bolts	Himself	Series regular 6 episodes Nicknamed "Jack of All Trades"
2020	The Eric Andre Show	Himself	Guest; Episode: "Hannibal Quits"
2021	Jackass Shark Week	Himself	TV special
2021	WWE SmackDown	Himself	Episode 24.10; Guest appearance
2022	Royal Rumble (2022)	Himself	Guest appearance
2022	WrestleMania 38	Himself	Johnny Knoxville's accomplice
2022	Jackass Shark Week 2.0	Himself	TV special
2022	Celebrity Family Feud	Himself	Participant; Episode 9.11

=== Films ===
Year	Title	Role	Notes
2022	Jackass Forever	Himself	New cast member Writer
2022	Jackass 4.5	Himself	New cast member Writer
2026	Jackass: Best and Last	Himself	Writer

=== Web series ===
Year	Title	Role	Notes
2021	Truth or Dab	Himself	Guest appearance 1 episode
2023	Steve-O's Wild Ride!	Himself	Guest; Podcast; 1 episode
2026	Jackass: The Podcast	Himself	Guest; Podcast; 1 episode
2026	Let It Kill You: Jeff Tremaine	Himself	Documentary
