= She (Tyler, the Creator song) =

Single by Tyler, the Creator featuring Frank Ocean

from the album Goblin
- Released: May 10, 2011
- Recorded: 2010
- Genre: Alternative hip hop; horrorcore; R&B
- Length: 4:13
- Label: Odd Future; XL
- Songwriters: Tyler Okonma; Christopher Breaux
- Producer: Tyler, the Creator

Tyler, the Creator singles chronology
"Yonkers" (2011)	"She" (2011)	"Trouble on My Mind" (2011)

Frank Ocean singles chronology
"She" (2011)	"Novacane" (2011)

"She" is a song by American rapper and producer Tyler, the Creator featuring American singer Frank Ocean. It was released on May 10, 2011, as the fourth single from Tyler's second studio album Goblin (2011), through Odd Future Records and XL Recordings. The song was recorded in 2010, and was written and produced by Tyler himself, who wrote the track alongside Ocean.

The song is written from the perspective of an obsessive lover who stalks and watches a woman while she sleeps. Lyrically, the song explores dark themes of necrophilia, stalking, and obsession. The song received critical acclaim from music critics who praised Ocean's hook, though the subject matter was often noted as questionable in nature and content.

A music video for the single was released on June 3, 2011, on the Odd Future YouTube channel. It was directed by Tyler himself and features Ocean. The video contains black humor and was noted for approaching its subject matter in a satirical, tongue-in-cheek manner. Both Tyler and Frank Ocean would often perform the song together during their various tours and was notably performed at the April 2011 Coachella Music Festival.

== Production and composition ==
Rapper Tyler, the Creator, who, at the time, was often known for his controversial nature, and R&B singer and occasional rapper Frank Ocean, who joined hip hop collective Odd Future, had quickly bonded and became friends, collaborating on several tracks such as "Analog 2", "Window" and "She." Ocean appears on the track "She" providing a rapping verse (intro), and the hook, while Tyler raps and covers the production.

"She"
A sample of the track, containing the end of Ocean's verse and his hook.

"She" has been described as "the closest thing to a slow jam on Goblin, where "Tyler genuinely wrestles with lust." The song features Tyler, the Creator pining "for a gorgeous girl" while "crooner Frank Ocean chimes in with a vocal hook". The track is "delivered with sweetly juvenile expressions of desire, except that Tyler peppers the track with a single-word epithet that would earn him a kick in the groin from any self-respecting woman." HipHopDX's Sean Ryon mused that "even the more subdued songs like "She" with Frank Ocean" embody "Tyler’s middle-fingers-up attitude, as he twists perverted tales of stalking girls and “stabbing Bruno Mars in his goddamn esophagus” into anathematic odes to unbridled individualism."

Though it was noted that even "She" has "passing moments of lyrical humanity to go with the pliant music ("When I'm with my friends I just put on a front / But in the back of my top I'm writing songs about 'we'"), The Village Voice's Eric Harvey wrote that the "sinuous Frank Ocean feature "She" ramps up the voyeurism" and that he "keeps things within a Rear Window framework. He admits he's going through the dating motions strictly to get laid, but he also says that his violent front is just a show for his boys."

The song was featured on Tyler's first studio album titled Goblin, in which "She" was released as the third single from that album. In 2022, Tyler revealed during a concert at the Crypto.com Arena that he originally produced the beat for Snoop Dogg, but didn’t know how to reach out to him. HipHopDX subsequently reported that Snoop had approved of the song in an interview filmed months after the song's release.

== Reception ==
"She" received critical acclaim from most music critics. Pitchfork's Scott Plagenhoef commented that while Goblin "could have used an editor", "the highs are very high: "She" work as standalones away from the album as a whole." Source writer Kazeem commented "Tyler links up with fellow breakout star of the OFWGKTA, Frank Ocean, where the in demand crooner spits a couple of better-than-it has-any-right-being 16 bars, while seamlessly weaving into a haunting hook." Craig Jenkin's Prefix magazine mused that the "jazzy chord progression and syrupy vocals from Odd Future associate Frank Ocean sneakily conceal its stalker vibe and crass lyrical conceit." AbsolutePunk's Ian Walker praised Ocean on the track, writing: "his verse and chorus showcase both sides of his expertise, as he can write both hip-hop and R&B influenced vocals with ease. While 'She' tends to get lost in the midst of heavier tracks like 'Yonkers' and 'Transylvania,' it deserves a ton of recognition for leaning a bit more towards a mainstream sound Odd Future isn't known for while staying true to their original vision."

NME's Louis Pattison described the track as a "curdled take on silky ’70s rare groove legend Roy Ayers" and stated that it was "actually rather gorgeous". Tiny Mix Tapes commented however that Tyler's "flow is painful to listen to on slower tracks such as "She" thought [it] was saved by his ambition [in] production". Max Feldman of PopMatters noted that Tyler "also does a lot of thinking through the medium of his own genitals, as evidenced on lusty R&B crooner "She" where he lets his perverse side free." Commercially, although the single would not chart, it was certified 4× Platinum by the Recording Industry Association of America (RIAA) for equivalent sales of 4,000,000 units in the United States. It was also certified Platinum by Music Canada (MC) for equivalent sales of 80,000 units in the country, and was certified Silver by the British Phonographic Industry (BPI) for equivalent sales of 200,000 units in the country.

== Music video ==
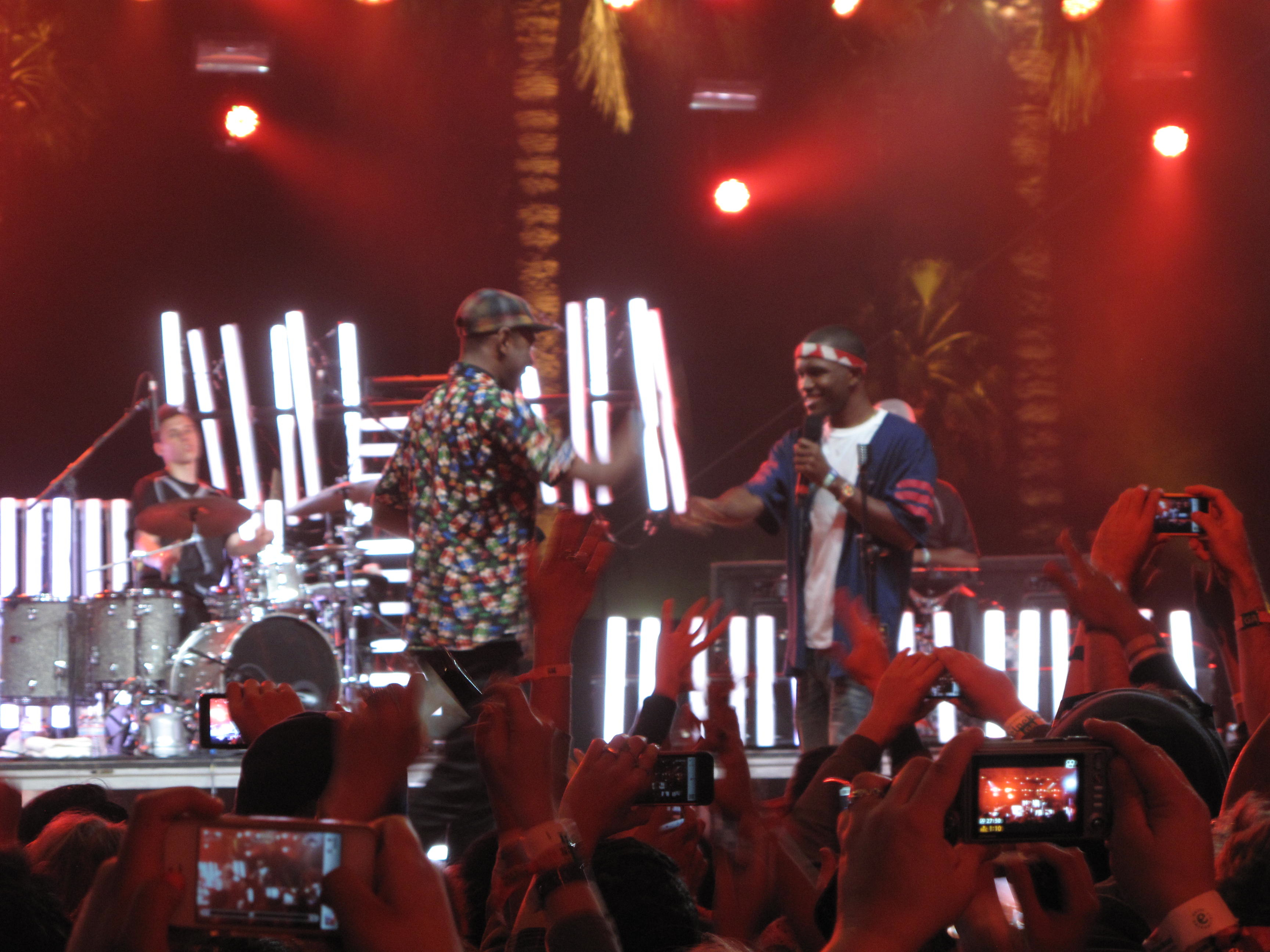
Tyler and Ocean performing together in 2012

The music video for "She" was shot in Los Angeles. Ocean posted several behind the scene photos of the video shoot onto his own personal Tumblr account, including pictures "with a pretty young thing as his leading lady." Ocean plays "double duty as a cop and the man of the house, almost unrecognizable in a white wig and drab attire. In one of the more violent images, Tyler stares into the camera as a gun is pointed at his head, wearing the same black contacts he sported in his viral sensation “Yonkers” video." The video has garnered over 100 million views on YouTube.

The video opens with Odd Future's R&B crooner Frank Ocean in bed with the unnamed "she" of the video, and the singer stops when he sees a masked Tyler staring outside of her bedroom window. The rapper eventually enters the room as the girl falls asleep, caressing her and writing a note on her mirror while spitting the song's first verse (especially the line "I finally got the courage to ask you on a date, so just say yes and let the future fall into place") before the police show up and arrest him.

Tyler performed "She" and "Novacane" with Ocean at an Odd Future performance in New York City. During Odd Future 2012's tour promoting The Odd Future Tape Vol. 2, Ocean performed with the group and played the song with Tyler.

== Certifications ==
Certifications for "She"
Region	Certification	Certified units/sales
Canada (Music Canada)	Platinum	80,000^{‡}
New Zealand (RMNZ)	Platinum	30,000^{‡}
United Kingdom (BPI)	Silver	200,000^{‡}
United States (RIAA)	4× Platinum	4,000,000^{‡}
^{‡} Sales+streaming figures based on certification alone.
