= 435 (song) =

Single by Tyler, the Creator
- B-side: "OKRA"
- Released: May 22, 2018
- Recorded: February 2018
- Genre: Old-school hip hop; hip hop soul
- Length: 1:33
- Label: Columbia
- Songwriters: Mark Waterfield; Sarah Cracknell; Tyler Okonma
- Producers: Tyler, the Creator

Tyler, the Creator singles chronology
"Okra" (2018)	"435" (2018)	"Peach Fuzz" (2018)

Music video
- "435" Video on YouTube

"435" is a song by American hip hop artist Tyler, the Creator, released as a digital single on May 22, 2018. It was written and produced by Tyler, the Creator. It was released unannounced, similar to "Okra". The song revolves around a sample of Saint Etienne’s "4:35 In The Morning."

A music video, filmed by Luis "Panch" Perez, was released simultaneously with the single.

== Background and release ==
As with "Okra", "435" was released with no prior announcement on May 22, 2018, following a series of Twitter posts from Tyler, the Creator explaining that the song had been recorded in early February 2018 on a Philadelphia tour stop on his tour with Vince Staples, and that the song was "not an indication of how future [songs] will sound".

== Music video ==
The music video for "435" was filmed by Luis "Panch" Perez, featuring a "one shot" take of Tyler, the Creator in a music recording studio.

== Track listing ==
Digital download
No.	Title	Writer(s)	Length
1.	"435"	Mark Waterfield; Sarah Cracknell; Tyler Okonma	1:33

== Credits and personnel ==
Credits adapted from Tidal.

- Tyler, the Creator – composition, production, vocals
- Mark Waterfield - composition
- Sarah Cracknell - composition
- Neal Pogue – mix engineering
- Mike Bozzi – master engineering
- Zach Acosta - assistant engineer
- Vic Wainstein – record engineering
