= Lionel Boyce =

American actor, writer and producer (born 1991)

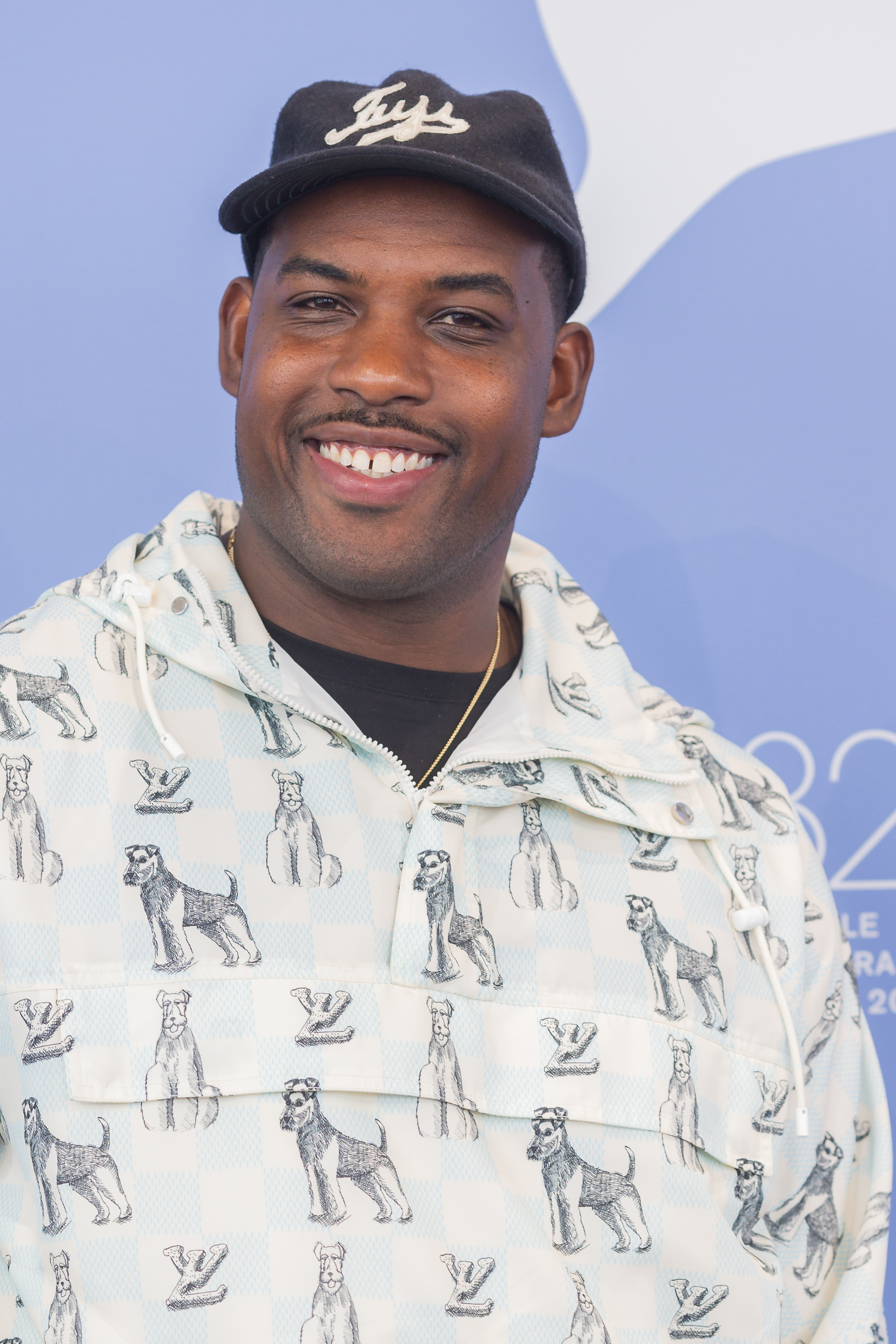
- Boyce at the 2025 Venice Film Festival
- Born: May 9, 1991 (age 35); Inglewood, California, U.S.
- Other name: L-Boy
- Occupations: Actor; writer; producer; musician
- Years active: 2011–present
- Organization: Bald Fade Productions
- Known for: Loiter Squad; The Jellies!; The Bear; Project Hail Mary
- Musical career
- Genre: Alternative hip-hop
- Instruments: Vocals
- Years active: 2011–2023
- Formerly of: Odd Future

Lionel Boyce (born May 9, 1991), also known as L-Boy, is an American actor, writer, producer, and former musician. He is best known for playing Marcus Brooks in the comedy-drama series The Bear (2022–2026), for which he was nominated for the Primetime Emmy Award for Outstanding Supporting Actor in a Comedy Series in 2024, and Carl in the science fiction film Project Hail Mary (2026).

Boyce is also known for being a member of hip hop musical collective Odd Future as well as for co-creating the sketch comedy series Loiter Squad (2012–2014) and the animated sitcom The Jellies! (2017–2019).

== Early life ==
Boyce, who is of African American heritage, grew up in Inglewood, California. His father was an Arrowhead Water delivery driver, and his mother was a Los Angeles County sheriff. He worked at Hollister Co. and played football. He attended Westchester High School, where he befriended Tyler, the Creator in a theater class.

== Career ==
A former member of alternative hip hop collective Odd Future, he co-created the 2012 sketch comedy television series Loiter Squad. In 2014, he teamed up with Earl Sweatshirt for collaborative effort DJ Billy Jole. Boyce and Tyler, the Creator formed Bald Fade Productions in 2015, co-creating the adult animated sitcom The Jellies!

Since 2022, Boyce has played Marcus Brooks, a sensitive, quiet and kind-hearted pastry chef, in the comedy-drama television series The Bear. He received a Primetime Emmy Award nomination for the series. Before shooting The Bear, Boyce observed a day at Tartine bakery in Los Angeles, and spent two weeks staging at Hart Bageri in Copenhagen. Additionally, before shooting the episode "Honeydew", he did extensive training with Courtney Storer, the show's culinary producer.

Early 2024, Boyce helped Daiya launch its cheese dupe Fromage Forgery. Around that time, he also joined the cast of the thriller film Shell.

On 31 July 2025, Kendrick Lamar and Dave Free's multidisciplinary creative communications company PGLang announced Project 3, their newest branch and creative agency. The announcement was released along with a short film titled The Agency, starring Chase Sui Wonders and Boyce, directed by Jack Begert, who co-wrote it alongside Free.

== Personal life ==
Boyce enjoys playing chess.

== Filmography ==
=== Film ===
Year	Title	Role	Notes
2017	Sremm Break	Officer Norris	Short
2017	Cherry Bomb The Documentary	Himself	Short
2022	Jackass Forever	Himself	Guest appearance
2024	Shell	Detective Abramson	
2025	Motor City	Youngblood	
2026	Project Hail Mary	Carl	

=== Television ===
Year	Title	Role	Notes
2012–2014	Loiter Squad	Various	Voice; also co-creator, writer, producer
2015, 2017–2019	The Jellies!	Various	Voice; also co-creator, writer, producer
2017	Hey You, It's Me	James	Episode: "Yes! But Different"
2018	Hap and Leonard	Leon	4 episodes
2019	Jasper and Errol's First Time	Himself	9 episodes, also producer
2022–2026	The Bear	Marcus Brooks	Main role; 42 episodes Also writer, episode: "Worms"
2024	Curb Your Enthusiasm	Garden Center Clerk	Episode: "The Lawn Jockey"

== Awards and nominations ==
Year	Work	Award	Category	Result	Ref.
2023	The Bear	Screen Actors Guild Awards	Outstanding Performance by an Ensemble in a Comedy Series	Nominated	
2024	The Bear	Screen Actors Guild Awards	Outstanding Performance by an Ensemble in a Comedy Series	Won	
2024	The Bear	Primetime Emmy Awards	Outstanding Supporting Actor in a Comedy Series	Nominated	
2025	The Bear	Screen Actors Guild Awards	Outstanding Performance by an Ensemble in a Comedy Series	Nominated	
