= Matt Martians production discography =

The following list is a discography of production by Matt Martians, an American record producer. It includes a list of songs produced and co-produced by year, artist, album and title.

== Solo ==
=== 2017 ===
==== The Drum Chord Theory ====
- 01. "Spend The Night / If You Were My Girlfrend"
- 02. "What Love Is"
- 03. "Where Are Yo Friends?"
- 04. "Baby Girl"
- 05. "Southern Isolation"
- 06. "Found Me Some Acid Tonight" (feat. Steve Lacy)
- 07. "Alotta Women / Useless" (feat. Kari Faux)
- 08. "Down"
- 10. "Callin' On Me"
- 11. "Diamond in da Ruff"
- 12. "Elevators (Bonus)"

Notes

- "Diamond in da Ruff" contains hidden track "Feelin"

=== 2019 ===
==== The Last Party ====
- 04. "Off My Feet/Westside Rider Anthem"
- 05. "Pony Fly" (feat. Steve Lacy)
- 06. "Southern Isolation 2"
- 07. "Look Like" (feat. Daisy)

=== 2021 ===
==== Going Normal ====
- 01. "Can't Believe It"
- 02. "Happiness Inside"
- 03. "Stampede"
- 04. "Killer California"
- 05. "God Said It's Ok To Fall" (feat. Charlie Myles)
- 06. "An Eater"
- 07. "Blazin'"
- 08. "Mercury Retrograde"
- 09. "Where I Lived"

==== Butterfly Don't Visit Caterpillar ====
- 01. "ADHD Anthem"
- 02. "Come See What I Saw"
- 03. "Need Nobody"
- 04. "Dance Shoos"
- 05. "Bored Of Everything"
- 06. "Win The War"
- 07. "Best 4 Me"

=== 2024 ===
==== Matt's Missing ====
- 01. "B Like That"
- 02. "Rushback"
- 03. "Perfect Warning"
- 04. "Play"
- 05. "The Reason"
- 06. "Bassline"
- 07. "Best Girl"
- 08. "Don't Even Think About It"
- 09. "Adjust"
- 10. "Sick N' Tired"

== Kent Jamz ==
=== Fanclub ===
- 14. Taj Mahal [produced with Steve Lacy & Christopher Allan Smith]

== Steve Lacy ==
=== 2022 ===
==== Gemini Rights ====
- 06. 2Gether (Enterlude)

== The Internet ==
=== 2011 ===
==== Purple Naked Ladies ====
- 01. "Violet Nude Women"
- 02. "They Say / Shangrila (feat. Tay Walker)"
- 03. "She DGAF"
- 04. "Cunt"
- 05. "Cocaine / Tevie"
- 06. "Ode to a Dream"
- 07. "Gurl (feat. Pyramid Vritra)"
- 09. "Lincoln (feat. Left Brain & Mike G)"
- 11. "She Knows"
- 13. "Visions (feat. Coco O.)"
- 14. "The Garden"

=== 2013 ===
==== Feel Good ====
- 05. "Pupil / The Patience"
- 06. "Red Balloon"
- 09. "Matt's Apartment"
- 13. "Higher Times (feat. Jesse Boykins III)"

=== 2015 ===
==== Ego Death ====
- 01. "Get Away"
- 02. "Gabby (feat. Janelle Monáe)"
- 03. "Under Control"
- 04. "Go With It (feat. Vic Mensa)
- 06. "For the World (feat. James Fauntleroy)
- 08. "Special Affair"
- 09. "Something's Missing"
- 11. "Penthouse Cloud"

=== 2018 ===
==== Hive Mind ====
- 01. "Come Together"
- 03. "Come Over"
- 05. "Stay the Night"
- 06. "Bravo"
- 07. "Mood"
- 08. "Next Time/Humble Pie"
- 09. "It Gets Better (With Time)"
- 11. "Wanna Be"
- 12. "Beat Goes On"
- 13. "Hold On"

== The Jet Age of Tomorrow (The Super 3) ==
=== 2008 ===
==== Odd Future - The Odd Future Tape ====
- 03. "Laxin'" (performed by Hodgy Beats)
- 05. "Bubble Gum" (performed by Tyler, The Creator, Casey Veggies and Hodgy Beats)
- 09. "Money Talk" (performed by Casey Veggies and Hodgy Beats)
- 10. "Our Story" (performed by Hodgy Beats)

=== 2010 ===
==== The Jet Age of Tomorrow - Voyager ====
- 01. "Welcome Aboard Voyager"
- 02. "Can I Hold Your Hand?!"
- 03. "Friday"
- 04. "But She Not My Lover"
- 05. "Don't Tell the Mermaids"
- 06. "Rapido Eye Movement"
- 07. "Revenge of the Ranger Wranglers"
- 08. "The Knight Hawk"
- 09. "Hercules Cup"
- 10. "Orange Juice Simpson"
- 11. "Strobe Light
- 12. "My Good Girl"
- 13. "They Dove Through the Ice Into the Unfathomable Depths of the Abyss"
- 14. "Submarine"
- 15. "Lisa, Where Have You Been?"
- 16. "EUROPA"

==== The Jet Age of Tomorrow - Journey to the 5th Echelon ====
- 01. "Green Stars (Intro)"
- 02. "5th Echelon"
- 03. "Pack Up"
- 04. "Love In The Purple Forest"
- 05. "Dust Off" (featuring Hodgy Beats and Mike G)
- 06. "Thump Thump"
- 07. "The Fallen Angels" (produced with Left Brain)
- 08. "Sunburst" (produced with Tyler Major)
- 09. "LunchBox" (featuring Vince Staples and JQ)
- 10. "Wonderland"
- 13. "The Finer Things" (featuring Om'Mas Keith)
- 14. "Protozoa (Yow!)"
- 15. "Burfday"
- 16. "Sleep!"
- 17. "Welcome Home Son" (featuring Casey Veggies and Tyler, The Creator)
- 18. "A Happy Ending" (produced with Kream Team)
- 19. "Her Secrets" (Bonus track)

=== 2011 ===
==== Odd Future - 12 Odd Future Songs ====
- 04. "Welcome Home Son" (performed by The Jet Age of Tomorrow featuring Casey Veggies and Tyler, The Creator)
- 09. "But She's Not My Lover" (performed by The Jet Age of Tomorrow)

=== 2012 ===
==== Odd Future - The OF Tape Vol. 2 ====
- 04. "Ya Know" (performed by The Internet)

=== 2013 ===
==== The Jet Age of Tomorrow - JellyFish Mentality ====
- 01. "Warping Walls"
- 02. "Special K (Wombat)"
- 03. "Desert N' The Dark (JAOT Dub)" (featuring The Stepkids)
- 04. "ON!"
- 05. "Juney Jones" (featuring Mac Miller and Speak!)
- 06. "Panic On Pluto"
- 07. "Not So Scary" (featuring Kilo Kish)
- 08. "Love In Water"
- 09. "Lily Pads"
- 10. "A Place Where Lovers Go" (featuring Jesse Boykins III)
- 11. "Machines Machines"
- 12. "One Take" (featuring Earl Sweatshirt and Casey Veggies)
- 13. "SuperFINE"
- 14. "Mushy"
- 15. "The Door's Door"
- 16. "Asia" (featuring Mike G)
- 17. "Squares"
- 18. "Wonderful World" (featuring Domo Genesis and Vince Staples)
- 19. "Naked" (featuring Hodgy Beats)
- 20. "Airport"
- 21. "Telephones"

=== 2017 ===
==== The Jet Age of Tomorrow - God's Poop or Clouds? ====
- 01. "Summer is Ending"
- 02. "The Long Way Home" (feat. Syd)
- 03. "Escape City"
- 04. "The Jaunt"
- 05. "Friday Night/the World's Ending"
- 06. "Wool Glasses"
- 07. "Ain't a Party"
- 08. "Buzzin'"
- 09. "Chance" (feat. MarkUsFree & India Shawn)
- 10. "1 A.M"
- 11. "LocoMotive"
- 12. "Dis Far Witcha'"
- 13. "Fly Like Me"
- 14. "What Reality?"
- 15. "Come on Wit Me Gurl"

== The Super D3Shay ==
=== 2009 ===
==== The Super D3Shay - The Super D3Shay ====
- 01. "I Want Eargasms"
- 02. "Radio Love"
- 03. "The Last Martians"
- 05. "Searching For"
- 06. "Bad Day"
- 07. "We Were"
- 08. "Where Is Home"
- 09. "Sign Off"

== With Earl Sweatshirt as Sweaty Martians ==
=== Earl Sweatshirt - Doris ===
- 5. Hive (featuring Casey Veggies & Vince Staples)

=== 2014 ===
==== Matt Martians ====
- "Horn"

=== MIKE - crimson ===
- 1. crimson
