= Rella (song) =

2012 single by Odd Future

Single by Odd Future featuring Hodgy Beats, Domo Genesis, and Tyler, The Creator

from the album The OF Tape Vol. 2
- Released: February 20, 2012
- Recorded: 2011
- Genre: Alternative hip hop
- Length: 3:12
- Label: Odd Future
- Songwriters: Vyron Turner; Gerard Long; Dominique Cole; Tyler Okonma
- Producer: Left Brain

Odd Future singles chronology
"Rella" (2012)	"NY (Ned Flander)" (2012)

"Rella" is a single by Odd Future featuring members Hodgy Beats, Domo Genesis, and Tyler, The Creator, released as the lead single from Odd Future's debut studio album The OF Tape Vol. 2. It was produced by Left Brain. The single was released digitally on February 20, 2012 and added onto the album as the tenth track on the 20th of March.

== Music video ==
The music video for "Rella" was released on February 20, 2012 on the official Odd Future YouTube channel. The video was directed by Tyler, The Creator, and according to Pitchfork Media's Jordan Sargent the video can be summarized as "Hodgy Beats shoots lasers from his crotch turning girls into cats, while Domo Genesis smacks a black girl in the face, turning her into an Asian, and Tyler as a coke-snorting centaur".

== Track listing ==
No.	Title	Producer	Length
1.	"Rella" (featuring Hodgy Beats, Domo Genesis, and Tyler, The Creator)	Left Brain	3:10

== Charts ==
Chart (2012)	Peak position
US R&B/Hip-Hop Digital Songs (Billboard)	50
