= Oldie (disambiguation) =

Oldies is a term for musical genres from around the mid-1950s to the late 1960s.

Oldie may refer to:

- H. L. Oldie, pen name of Ukrainian science fiction and fantasy writers Dmitry Gromov and Oleg Ladyzhensky
- "Oldie" (song), a 2012 song by American hip hop collective Odd Future
- The Oldie, a British monthly magazine for older people
- Oldie, a character from the webtoon Live with Yourself!

== See also ==
- Oldie Blues, a Dutch record label
