= Pyramid Vritra =

American rapper and record producer (born 1991)

- Also known as: Donell Proper; Δ; Vritra; Big Ralph; donellvritrajet; LaRane; 72DEMONS; Parrka
- Born: Hal Donell Williams Jr. November 11, 1991 (age 35); Baton Rouge, Louisiana, United States
- Origin: Los Angeles, California, United States
- Genres: Hip hop; electronica; experimental hip hop; dance; punk rock
- Occupations: Rapper; record producer
- Instruments: Vocals; keyboards; drums; modulator
- Years active: 2008–present
- Labels: Bad Taste; Blossom; Stones Throw; The Order; 5th Echelon Jet Repair Co.; WDYSWYEC
- Member of: Wilma Vritra
- Formerly of: Odd Future; NRK; The Jet Age of Tomorrow
- Website: wdyswyec.com

Hal Donell Williams Jr. (born November 11, 1991), known professionally as Pyramid Vritra, is an American rapper and record producer. Aside from their solo career, they initially rose to fame as a member of Los Angeles–based hip hop collective Odd Future via the sub-group The Jet Age of Tomorrow alongside Matt Martians, and Atlanta-based hip hop collective NRK (Nobody Really Knows). They are one half of transatlantic hip-hop duo Wilma Vritra alongside Wilma Archer. They have released music under Stones Throw Records, Alpha Pup's The Order Label, and Bad Taste Records.

== Early life ==
Hal Donell Williams Jr. was born on November 11, 1991, in Baton Rouge, Louisiana. Williams moved throughout multiple states during their childhood due to their mother's service in the United States Air Force, before relocating long-term to Powder Springs, Georgia.

== Musical career ==
=== 2008: NRK and beginnings ===
After moving to Powder Springs, Georgia as an early highschooler, Williams started making music with friends for the sake of listening to while skateboarding. Initially they started working with the rapper KC 2.0 (now Lombardi), as the duo “Kash and Gullie”. Later, more artists and neighborhood friends joined Williams in starting a rap collective. These included Adlive Murdock (later, Pyramid Murdock), The Original (later, Gloomy Pyramid), Tyler Major, Andre McCloud and Floyd Mables. After adopting the name "The Bandits" the group released a mixtape titled “The Goodwill Tape” in 2009. Later members included artists such as Lui Diamonds, Pyramid Quince and Mr Northstar. Member Jay Cue suggested they rename the group “NRK" (Nobody Really Knows).

NRK performed numerous live shows, and released mixtapes on their own NRK music label via their website. The members of the group continued to work with each other and Williams throughout their careers. Williams’ mother had always been supportive of their musical endeavors, letting them and the rest of NRK work in their house’s basement as a rudimentary recording studio.

Before releasing “The Goodwill Tape” in 2009, Williams reached out to Odd Future artist Matt Martians on the social media then known as Twitter, requesting help on mixing and mastering for the project. This marked the beginning of their longstanding collaborative relationship.

=== 2010-2012: Odd Future, Jet Age of Tomorrow beginnings, and initial solo projects ===
In 2010, Williams would start seriously pursuing music as a career path while being mentored by Matt Martians with the rest of NRK. That year, they released their first solo project, Eloise, and began composing with Matt Martians as “The Jet Age of Tomorrow” (then “The Super 3”), becoming an Odd Future sub-group.

Williams adopted the alias "Pyramid Vritra", after the water serpent God of chaos in Vedic theology, a subject Williams was interested in high school, while aligning themself with other NRK members who shared the pyramid the stage name motif.

Williams began their new alias with the April 2010 EP "Elouise". In the June, Williams would release an EP, Technicolor Pyramids, releasing it under the alias "Walter Flowers", and a beat tape titled "paint." under another alias "donellvritrajet".

The Jet Age of Tomorrow blended psychedelic neo-soul with Williams' experimental approach to hip hop. One extended play and two albums were released that year from the duo via Odd Future's Tumblr page, Voyager, and Journey to the 5th Echelon. Voyager being a mostly instrumental project featuring the song titled “The Knight Hawk” which was later sampled by Kendrick Lamar on the song “A.D.H.D”, and the latter being a larger scale project with guest appearances from additional Odd Future members and affiliates such as Hodgy, Tyler, The Creator, Mike G, Casey Veggies, Vince Staples, and Kilo Kish, alongside NRK members such as Jay Cue and Tyler Major.

On February 4, 2011, a music video for the album’s track, "Wonderland" had been posted on the official Odd Future YouTube channel.

Both albums excluded the shock value of other Odd Future mixtapes, instead opting for a greater emphasis on atmospheric melodies and electronic approaches to acid jazz. That same year, NRK would release a mixtape entitled “The Nobody Really Knows Us: Compilation of Audible Sound Vol.1”, more simply alternatively titled “The NRK Compilation,” featuring original production and vocals from nearly all NRK members.

Williams continued their musical career with their first major solo effort in 2011 “The Story of Marsha Lotus'”. The project was released via Stroll on Records, with genres ranging from avant-garde jazz to psychedelic hip-hop. While consisting only of 6 tracks, some were 15 to 18 minutes in length. The album saw a re-release on vinyl and streaming services in 2012.

Alongside the Jet Age of Tomorrow, now frequent collaborator Matt Martians would attempt to start another musical project with Williams alongside other Odd Future members of Syd and Left Brain, which would eventually become The Internet. Yet by the release of the band's initial debut Purple Naked Ladies, with both Williams and Left Brain featuring on the tracks “Gurl” and “Cocaine” respectively, the project became a duo effort only between Martians and Syd.

In July of 2012, Williams released the song “Drain”, featuring Syd (under the alias of ‘Frisco’) with an accompanying music video. The track was the first single to William’s debut studio album, “Pyramid”.

Other promotion for the album, included a self-titled mixtape entitled “PYRAMIDVRITRA”, composed of draft material which did not make the final cut of the Pyramid album. The mixtape released on November 11, 2011, being their 20th birthday.

On August 7th, 2012, Williams released Pyramid, describing the album as “whimsical, dreamy, technical, s[e]mi-lethargic, experimental anger pop”. Alongside Syd, the album featured familiar collaborator Matt Martians, NRK members Andre McCloud, K.C 2.0 Pyramid Murdock, and Tyler Major, alongside additional features of Speak! and Gary Wilson. To further promote the album, Williams performed at the Odd Future Carnival (now, Camp Flog Gnaw) with the rest of the rap collective.

In 2012, Williams would also form the NRK side project of Rose Gold Dutch Masters, with fellow NRK members Tyler Major, Pyramid Murdock and Andre McCloud. The group was featured alongside additional NRK member Jay Cue, Matt Martians, and Vince Staples on an 18 minute EP by Williams, consisting of a single track, titled “Elenor”.

The project would fully culminate in a mixtape with longtime collaborator Caleb Stone entitled “-___-”, alternatively verbally titled “Smuggins”, which they released tumblr for free. The mixtape was described featuring the blends of hip hop with neo-Soul synth funk NRK and Jet age of Tomorrow fans had come to expect, with a noted emphasis on how no samples were utilized during its production.

As the Jet Age of Tomorrow began to achieve momentum in the underground Hip Hop community, Williams would move from Georgia to Los Angeles to live with Matt Martians to work closer on musical projects as well as attend label meetings. This, however, was only for a short period of time, as both Williams and Martians were evicted from their apartment, obliging Williams to move back to Georgia for a year. This frustrated Williams, as when they returned, they felt like most Odd Future acts had already signed to prominent labels to build their careers, while they were left behind, unable to secure similar success. “I was experiencing the success of Odd Future, but I wasn’t necessarily a part of it. Everybody had all this money, but I was the one driving people around asking for gas money.”

=== 2013-2015: Stones Throw Records and The Jellyfish Mentality ===
In 2013, Williams and Martians released “The Jellyfish Mentality”. The mixtape featured more Odd Future members and collaborators such as Earl Sweatshirt, Mac Miller, Casey Veggies, Mike G Hodgy, Vince Staples, Domo Genesis, and Kilo Kish. Williams did not work as closely with Martians on the project as during their previous albums, since the duo did not sequence the tracklist together in person.

Williams self-released a music video for the bonus track “Delta” on the NRK Youtube channel.

While working on Pyramid in 2012, still vying for the attention of major record labels, Wilson suggested that Williams contact Stones Throw Records. Williams emailed Christopher Manak, known as Peanut Butter Wolf, the label's founder, a 6-track project called Kimberly. Williams did not hear a response for nearly half a year before being invited to meet with Manak, who later signed them to the label.

This was the first major record label to promote Williams' material outside of NRK and Odd Future affiliation, connecting Williams with fellow Stones Throw acts such as Mndsgn, Madlib, MF Doom and James Pants.

In 2013 Williams' self-released an EP called “Big Ralph’s Midnight Pink River Weather Grey,” recorded during a trip to Hawaii, which was promoted by the label.

Williams continued to work with Stones Throw on Kimberly, adding more tracks to the project and changing the title to Indra, the name of the God of thunder and rain in Vedic theology who is said to have defeated the Vritra serpent.

Indra released as Williams' major label debut in 2014. The album's songs were entirely produced and performed by Williams themself, with the exception of a sole feature from rapper Alberto Sparks on the song "Zord".

Stones Throw records promoted the album with music videos for the songs "Tea and Lemonadel, "Spool" and "Eleven12".

While the album received admiration and praise within the underground hip-hop scene, Williams was still unable to leave their job as a forklift operator between touring and performing.

Williams then released the EP Palace, marking the first in a series of smaller scale, more rap-centric extended plays. Stones Throw also promoted the album with music videos for the title track and the song "224". The EP entered the UK Official Singles Chart, peaking at #96.

Stones Throw later released a video for the song "Like Summer" from the project's sequel PV2, which compiled footage of Williams on the label's 2014 Asia tour in Hong Kong and Japan.

Williams later announced their third studio album ‘Dānu’, named after the Hindu primordial goddess described as the mother of Vritra in the Rigveda (I.32.9). Williams said they made stylistic choices on the album with their mother's musical taste in mind.

However, by 2015 Williams was no longer signed to Stones Throw, and had to rely on their own NRK social media pages to promote the project.

After Kevin Moo, known by his stage name Daddy Kev, head of Los Angeles based record label Alpha Pup Records, watched a performance of Williams' with the rest of NRK at Low End Theory, he signed the group to the label's rap division called The Order. Now, Williams could properly distribute and promote Dānu as well as later projects.

Williams later released singles with independently-produced music videos for the tracks “58 (Heavy)”, “IDLI2TSNM (I Don't Look In 2 Tha Sky No Mo)” and “V” to promote the album.

=== 2016-2018: VRITRA, Yellowing, and The Jet Age of Tomorrow reunion ===
In 2016, Williams released the album Yellowing, and said it signaled change in both their musical career and personal life.

In a statement to Hypebeast magazine, Williams said “Yellowing represents a change in my production style and subject matter. The entire project is about getting older, and yellowing as plastic does and pictures do when they age.” The album featured the track “Wings," dedicated to William’s then newly born son, Ivan.

The album was the first of William’s solo efforts to be released under the Alias “VRITRA”, rather than “Pyramid Vritra”.

Around this time other NRK members also removed the Pyramid motif from their stage names, with Pyramid Quince and Pyramid Murdock rebranding to Coodie Breeze and Mayhem Murdock respectively.

From there, Williams would go on to release an EP titled “I Miss My Son & My Wife :(“ alternatively titled “IM2S+MW” (I Miss My Second Self + My Wife) on platforms such as Bandcamp. Featuring production on the song “Failsafe”, by Matt Martians as the Jet Age of Tomorrow.

In 2017, the reunion of Williams and Matt Martians would culminate in the fourth and final Jet Age of Tomorrow album, “God’s Poop or Clouds?” with features from Earl Sweatshirt, India Shawn, Mark Us Free, and Syd, as well as contributions from members of The Internet, such as Patrick Page II, Christopher Allan Smith and Steve Lacy. The album released via Martian’s newly formed, independent record label “5th Echelon Jet Repair Co”, named after their second album.

In an interview with the Fader, Martians spoke on the end of the project, saying “I don't think there'll be another Jet Age album. It was a lot easier to make those records before, and that's just growing up.”

Williams released their fifth solo album “HAL,” one week later.

On November 10, 2018, Williams released two extended plays titled Double Rainbow and Felicity. However, Williams was unsatisfied with Felicity and took it down, and said they planned to rework the project into a short film. In 2022 Williams released a demo tape for a reworked version of the extended play, but has not released the aforementioned film. Double Rainbow has also been taken many times due to distributor issues.

=== 2019-2022: Wilma Vritra, FEMME and SONAR ===
In 2018 Williams began working on the album "Burd" with British producer Wilma Archer as 'Wilma Vritra'. The duo worked together via email at first, then met in Los Angeles to finish the recording process. The album differed heavily from William’s previous works, in that they had next to no output on the instrumentation, which was instead handled by Wilma Archer with the help of Tenor Saxophonist Theo Erskine.

This, according to Williams, allowed them to better focus on expressing themself lyrically, while experiencing depression at the time. The album was released on April 5, 2019 via Bad Taste records to generally positive reviews by critics and fans, with music videos for the songs “Ketchup” and “Targets & Digits”.

The single “Shallow Grave” received significant traction from audiences, earning millions of streams on platforms such as Spotify, and being featured on the soundtrack to American drama film The Fallout directed by Megan Park. The song was also used in a commercial for O2, a British telecommunications services provider.

Later in 2019, Williams released their sixth solo album FEMME on Blossöm records. The album was released alongside a 4-part music video series, featuring the tracks “Focus” (featuring NRK member Jay Cue and Tara Byars as Tequila Mockingbird), “Girl in Shorts”, “Feel Better”, and “HODL”.

That same year, Williams released three Extended Plays. One being a collaborative work with Los Angeles based rapper “Red Bag” titled “PV vs Red Bag”, the second being a sequel to the 2016 collaborative EP with N01SES, “Per Capita” titled “PC2”, and the third being a completely instrumental, self produced EP “Larane, In Christ, At Mass”.

With the momentum of Wilma Vritra on Bad Taste records, Williams would release their seventh studio album “SONAR” on the in 2020. The album, much like 2019’s “Burd”, did not feature production from Williams themself, and was produced by Leon Sylvers IV, son of Leon Sylvers III of the R&B family band The Sylvers. Sylvers was a longtime affiliate on other NRK projects with and without Williams as well.

The album was a primarily jazz rap focused work, differing from William’s, self proclaimed, “alternative dance [music], just from a more hip-hop perspective”. The album was preceded by the Extended Play, “FLOATERS”, also produced by Sylvers entirely. “SONAR” spawned two music videos released via Bad Taste records’ YouTube channel “Air Raid”, and “What’s That”, with a third, self-directed video released via Williams' YouTube channel for “Closer To God”

In 2021, Williams adopted a new stage name to release music under "LaRane," spawning a single and video for a song titled "PRASE." The moniker was quickly abandoned, and "PRASE," along with its music video, were later re-released as the song "Mirror!" for Williams' EP "Dark Dark, High Contrast" under Blössom Records. Williams released another song for the house-music centered project, with a self-released video titled "ULTRAVIOLET."

In 2022, Williams released the second studio effort with Wilma Archer as Wilma Vritra, entitled “Grotto”. The duo described the project in a statement to “The Fader”, “The album is about self-preservation, private reflection and personal refuge from an oppressive exterior”. “Grotto”, spawned music videos for the singles “One Under”, and “Clean Me Clean”, and received more generally positive reviews from fans and critics, admiring the atmospheric production of Archer and laid back vocal style of Williams.

Williams would then release another Blössom records EP, “VOID!” Marking a partial return to production since Femme, though still included production from other collaborators, including Sylvers on the song "Numbers". In 2023, Williams' released a remastered version of the project called "DEVOID".

In 2022 Williams would also release of two more extended plays, one with singer-songwriter, and producer, from the Philippines, Eyedress, titled “THEY ONLY LOVE YOU WHEN YOU LOVE YOU”, and “SNAKESS”.

=== 2024-Onwards: 72Demons and Parrka* ===
In 2022, Williams hosted community freestyle competitions on their personal Discord server. For the contests, Williams created a number of instrumental tracks for participants under a new alias "72DEMONS". These instrumental tracks would later comprise two minor Extended Plays; "Fitness P1" and "Fitness P2" respectively. The alias would remain largely secondary to the familiar "VRITRA" pseudonym, until February 2024, with the release of the Extended Play single "NOTHING MATTERS". The single served as the beginning of Williams' replacement of "72DEMONS" as their primary stage name.

In February of 2024, Williams released their eighth studio album “AMBER,” which they previously previewed in 2021. Released under Bad Taste records, the 9 track project featured production from Williams themself, Deleano Gipson, ELWD, Wilma Archer, and Big Flowers.

On October 25th of 2024, Williams would go on to release their first full length project as "72DEMONS", entitled "TRICK THE DEVIL" under Blössom records. The album was preceded by the singles "Blu Ray", "Destroi", "Near2Me" and "Gema Ur a Pearl". The final single was released alongside a remix by rapper and alternative rock artist, Paris From Tokyo. The project featured a more alternative punk-rock centered sound than Williams' previous works, while maintaining their experimental production style.

In April 2025, Williams launched a new persona, "Parka," to accompany a video series creating songs from found sounds and field recordings called "Find A Place. Make A Song," as well as a series of short form videos remixing songs made by other artists.

On November 11, 2025, their 34th birthday, Williams announced 2 projects: a complication of beats made from 2010-2015 entitled Odyssey, and a project entitled Husk.. Odyssey released on November 26, while Husk released on January 13. Williams said Husk is intended to be the final project under the VRITRA alias, with Odyssey serving as a tribute to their previous work. The EP was created in the span of a few weeks, in order to release a project Williams felt would finally absolve themself of their previous persona and musical identity.

In 2026, Williams announced the formal retirement of VRITRA as a stage name, with the exception of collaborative Wilma Vritra releases, now only referring to themselves as "Parrka*" (stylized with an additional 'r' and an asterisk) for music and other creative releases. "VRITRA was a concept, a character created by Hal Williams ... 9 albums later, that saga came to a conclusion with 'Husk'," Williams said.

== WDYSWYEC and other ventures ==
In 2019, Williams created a design firm specializing in product design, visual conceptualization, fashion and textiles called WDYSWYEC (What Do You See When Your Eyes Close). Williams said the company uses an abstract approach to cover artwork and clothing design, and is currently directing a film.

Williams released a music video titled "BOIL" on their YouTube channel to promote the fashion oriented side of the organization.

In 2020 Williams released more projects via Bandcamp to promote the company such as an EP "RANDO," which was later re-released as "FREE RANDO," and a DJ mix compilation titled "We Need Electrcity."

On April 17, 2021, Williams published an activity book titled Tunneling: An Introspective Journal. The book was available as an e-book via Kindle, and promoted as a self discovery method.

In 2022, Williams began a podcast of the same name (stylized as [TUNNELING]), hosted on their YouTube channel. Williams said the project is "a video podcast with creatives, musicians and artists about Love, perception and mental health."

== Discography ==
=== Studio albums ===
- Pyramid (2012)
- Indra (2014)
- Dānu (2015)
- Yellowing (2016)
- HAL (2017)
- FEMME (2019)
- SONAR (2020)
- AMBER (2024)
- TRICK THE DEVIL (2024) (as 72DEMONS)
- Waterrmarrk* (2026) (as Parrka*)

Extended plays

- Elouise (2010)
- Technicolour Pyramids EP (2010) (as Walter Flowers)
- Elenor (2012)
- Big Ralph's Midnight Pink River Weather Grey (2013)
- PV1 (2013)
- Palace (2014)
- PV2 (2014)
- PV3 (2015)
- PV4 (2015)
- I Miss My Son & My Wife :( (2016)
- Tape 322 (2017)
- Double Rainbow (2018)
- Felicity (2018)
- LARANE, in Christ, at Mass (2019)
- Rando (2020)
- Floaters (2020)
- Dark Dark, High Contrast (2021)
- VOID! (2022)
- SNAKESS (2022)
- [DEVOID] (2023, remaster of VOID!)
- NOTHING MATTERS (2024) (as 72DEMONS)
- Husk. (2025)

Collaborative extended plays

- Aditi (2013) (with Aditi)
- PV X JH X BC (2015) (with John Harrison and BigCat)
- Contact (2015) (with Aditi)
- Adelaide (2016) (with Caleb Stone)
- Per Capita (2016) (with N01SES)
- Sprouting (2018) (with Namek Beats)
- PC2 (2019) (with N01SES)
- PV VS RED BAG (2019) (with Red Bag)
- THEY ONLY LOVE YOU WHEN YOU LOVE YOU (2022) (with Eyedress)
- yOURS (2024) (with Tduchesss)

Mixtapes

- paint. (2010) (as donellvritrajet)
- The Story of Marsha Lotus (2011)
- PYRAMIDVRITRA (2011)
- -___- (Smuggins) (2012) (With Rose Gold Dutch Masters & Caleb Stone)
- Free Money. Egomericana. (2021)
- FREE RANDO (2022)
- Felicity (demo) (2022)

Compilations

- Scopolomine (2012)
- (Instrumentals: PV) (2013)
- Old Beats (Lost & Found Instrumentals by a Younger Vritra in the Past) (2014)
- We Need Electricity (2020)
- INST 1 - Journey Riddems (2022)
- INST 2 - Concrete Pop (2022)
- FITNESS P1 (2022) (as 72DEMONS)
- FITNESS P2 (2022) (as 72DEMONS)
- Odyssey (2025)

=== with NRK ===
Compilations

- The NRK Compilation (2010)

Mixtapes

- Goodwill (2009) (as The Bandits)

=== with Matt Martians (as The Jet Age of Tomorrow) ===
Studio albums

- Voyager (2010)
- Journey to the 5th Echelon (2010)
- JellyFish Mentality (2013)
- God's Poop or Clouds? (2017)

Extended plays

- Can I Hold Your Hand? (2010)
- JellyFish Mentality: Bonus EP (2013)

=== with Odd Future ===
Studio albums

- The OF Tape Vol. 2 (2012)

Compilations

- 12 Odd Future Songs (2011)

=== with Wilma Archer (as Wilma Vritra) ===
Studio albums

- Burd (2019)
- Grotto (2022)

=== Guest appearances ===
List of guest appearances, with other performing artists, showing year released and album name
Title	Year	Other artist(s)	Album
"Contemporary Content" (featuring Jay Cue)	2010	Tyler Major	The Suburbia EP
"Silver Orca"	2011	Gloomy Pyramid	Venue: Adventures Through Nature & All It Upholds
"Batman Beyond"	2011	Andre McCloud	Therapeutic Vapors
"Wandering"	2011	Jay Cue	Pyramid Life
"Sphinx Royal" (featuring KC 2.0)	2011	Tyler Major	Alone in His Meadow Garden
"Gurl"	2011	The Internet	Purple Naked Ladies
"Lysergik Music"	2011	ETHEREAL	▲ B S T R ▲ C T I C ▲
"LOST/ Cyber Stream"	2012	Mr. Northstar	lü-mə-ner-ē
"TB70"	2012	Kilo Kish	Homeschool
"City"	2012	Summer Camp	Always
"Way to the Trap"	2012	BigCat	Comatose
"Northern Lights" (featuring Tyler Major)	2012	BigCat	Comatose
"Goodwilled" (featuring Andre McCloud & KC 2.0)	2013	LuiDiamonds	Ipadchain
"Lakelady"	2013	They Hate Change	Today.
"Promenade"	2013	BigCat	Brainflower
"GPS"	2013	Jay Cue	Visions of Utopia
"NBA II"	2013	Andre McCloud	Gone EP
"Dumb"	2014	Darko the Super	Oh, No! It's Darko
"Borocco"	2014	Caleb Stone & ISSUE	Lavish Kingdom
"Untouchable"	2014	N01SES	Genesis
"Control"	2014	They Hate Change	Control
"Toothache"	2014	They Hate Change	Control
"Arievillaus Part II"	2014	Tyler Major	Fuchsia
"November"	2014	Mike G	Verses II
"Dice Game Chronicles" (featuring Mako)	2015	Clayton Samus	Natural
"Bloopers" (featuring Huey Briss)	2015	Pyramid Murdock	The Eye
"Yaak" (featuring Tyler Major & Pyramid Quince)	2015	Pyramid Murdock	The Eye
"Switchblade" (featuring Caleb Stone, Speakz, & Huey Briss)	2015	Mike G	Verses II
"Ghost Town"	2015	Specular Diagnostics	Raw Game
"Keys to the Sage"	2015	Tyler Major	From the River EP
"Rap Emporium" (featuring Swivel Complex)	2015	John Ibe	The Departure
"Ghost Whip" (featuring Ankhten Brown & Tyler Major)	2015	Eyedress	Shapeshifter
"1990"	2015	Eyedress	Shapeshifter
"Ignorant, I mean, GENIUS as Fuck"	2015	SayJak	God of Lead
"TrainCrazy324"	2015	Namek Beats	Kiwi
"Ooh"	2016	Paper Tiger	Blast Off
"These Spirits" (featuring Andre McCloud)	2016	Tyler Major	As the Water Falls
"Last Night on the Planet"	2016	Letherette	Last Night on the Planet
"Slamp" (featuring Huey Briss)	2016	Letherette	Where Have All the People Gone
"Level Up"	2016	Leon Sylvers IV	After Ours
"6 Letter Man, Money Dance"	2016	Leon Sylvers IV	After Ours
"Savor" (featuring kwamy.b)	2016	Leon Sylvers IV	After Ours
"Spalding"	2016	Coodie Breeze & Tyler Major	The Moon Lookin Fye Again
"Eatdoggyfood" (featuring Swarvy)	2016	Sofie Fatouretchi	Sofie's SOS Tape
"Submarine/322"	2016	Namek Beats	Non-album single
"Riverwater"	2017	Tyler Major	By Lakes
"Moedueao"	2017	Letherette	Brown Lounge, Vol. 3
"The Vibe"	2017	Jay Cue	Brazen
"Stunt"	2018	Jay Cue	TUDDA
"Seal Beach"	2018	Earoh	Suprachiasmatic
"Melanin"	2018	Pink Siifu	Ensley
"MPD the Source"	2018	SayJak	Non-album single
"Fuck Wit Me"	2019	Pink Siifu & Yungmorpheus	Bag Talk
"Livin Life"	2019	Phil 1026	Ridgewood Place
"Tetris"	2019	T-Shirt Haze	Non-album single
"Crybaby"	2019	Paige Gabarito	Non-album single
"Chain Reaction"	2020	Andre McCloud	Evil World
"High 5"	2020	Darko the Super	There's a Horse in the Hospital
"Mustard" (featuring Godfather Rito)	2020	N01SES	The Book of David
"Pierre"	2020	DrifterShapeShifter	Cyaneous EP
"Blossom"	2020	Sexy parrot	Mama Bear
"Video" (featuring ZekeUltra, Liiia, Elijah*)	2021	Big Flowers	Big Smile
"Pulling"	2021	Sôra	Long Life To Phil
"Damage Critical" (featuring Montae Montana)	2021	Gore_irl	Non-album single
"Reversible Keys"	2022	They Hate Change	Finally, New
"Not Me"	2022	Laneo Cinco	Non-album single
"Catching Fishes"	2023	Tyler Major	Have U Ever Touched Moss in the Rain?
"Grey Matter"	2023	ELWD	Monochrome
"Wicked Ways" (featuring Youngmorpheus)	2023	ELWD	Monochrome
"Peaches"	2023	Elliot James Mulhern	Agony of the Never Ending Fantasy
"Pyro Guys"	2023	Laneo Cinco	DAYSB4NEONPUNK
