= Award Tour II =

EP by Mike G
- Released: January 26, 2015
- Recorded: 2014
- Genre: Hip hop
- Length: 15:35
- Label: Odd Future
- Producers: Ace, the Creator; Jack Frost; Larry Fisherman; Left Brain; Patrick Paige II; randomblackdude

Mike G chronology
Verses (2013)	Award Tour II (2015)	Verses II (2015)

Singles from Award Tour II
- 1. "Highlights" Released: January 19, 2015

Award Tour II is the second extended play by American rapper Mike G. It was released on January 26, 2015, by Odd Future Records.

== Release and promotion ==
On January 19, 2015, the first single, "Highlights", was released, along with the track listing and release date. On January 26, 2015, a music video for "Archer" was released. On October 9, 2015, a music video for "Jameson" was released.

== Track listing ==
No.	Title	Writer(s)	Producer(s)	Length
1.	"Chloé"	Michael Griffin II; Patrick Paige II	Patrick Paige II	3:27
2.	"James Bond"	Griffin II; Malcolm McCormick	Larry Fisherman	3:14
3.	"Archer" (featuring Larry Susan)	Griffin II; Larry Susan; Vyron Turner	Left Brain	3:51
4.	"Highlights"	Griffin II; Tyler Okonma	Ace, the Creator	3:01
5.	"Jameson"	Griffin II; Thebe Kgositsile; Pharrell Williams; Chad Hugo	Jack Frost; randomblackdude	2:42

Notes

- "Jameson" contains vocal samples from "Burgundy" performed by Earl Sweatshirt
