= Broken Hearts Club (album) =

Studio album by Syd
- Released: April 8, 2022
- Genres: R&B, alternative R&B
- Length: 38:55
- Labels: Syd Solo; Columbia

Syd chronology
| Always Never Home (2017) | Broken Hearts Club (2022) | Beard (2026) |

Broken Hearts Club is the second studio album by American singer Syd. The album was released through Columbia Records on April 8, 2022.

== Background ==
Syd, a member of the Grammy-nominated band The Internet, released her second solo album five years after the release of her debut solo album, Fin. Whilst Fin has been described as a 'confident' and self-assured album, Broken Hearts Club is more 'vulnerable' - inspired by contrasting experiences of love and heartbreak. Syd began work on the album in the midst of a relationship, and finished it after the couple separated. The album follows a similar narrative pattern to her personal experience, starting with "CYBAH": a song about starting a new relationship, and closing with "Missing Out": which looks back on an ended relationship as both parties move on. In an interview with NME, Syd spoke about experiencing a creative period after she was diagnosed with depression and began to see a therapist, which enabled her to finish work on the album.

Syd, the former engineer for ex-band Odd Future, produced most of the record herself, collaborating on some songs with Rodney (Darkchild) Jerkins, bandmate Steve Lacy, and ForteBowie. Other collaborators include Smino, Kehlani on "Out Loud", Nicky Davey, Brandon Shoop, Troy Taylor, G Koop and Lucky Daye on "CYBAH".

"Missing Out" was released as a single in February 2021, with "Fast Car" and "Right Track" coming out in July and September of the same year respectively. In a press conference for "Fast Car", Syd said that the track was created because she 'wanted to make something for the gay Black girls'. The accompanying music video for the song, which the Gay Times called one of 'her most queer tracks to date', features Syd driving with a female love interest.

== Release and reception ==
Broken Hearts Club received positive reviews, with NME giving it four out of five stars and calling it 'arguably the R&B star's strongest project to date'. At Metacritic, which assigns a normalised rating out of 100 to reviews from mainstream publications, the album received an average score of 82, based on 10 critic reviews. Pitchfork gave the album a 7.5, saying that the album's more traditional sound than Fin, 'reaffirms her considerable versatility' and that the album is finished with 'artful finesse'. Rolling Stone gave the album four stars, arguing it was an 'epic tale of love and loss with lush production'. Independent music website The Quietus called the album 'terrific'. The Guardian, giving 3 stars, called the album a 'mixed bag', stating that Syd was stronger on tracks where she collaborated with other artists. Okayplayer included the album on their '22 Best Albums of 2022' list.

The album will be her last released by Columbia Records.

== Track listing ==
Broken Hearts Club

| No. | Title | Writer(s) | Producer(s) | Length |
|---|---|---|---|---|
| 1. | "CYBAH (with Lucky Daye)" | Brandon Shoop; David Debrandon Brown; Michael La Vell McGregor; Syd (Sydney Loren Bennett) | Brandon Shoop | 4:04 |
| 2. | "Tie The Knot" | Syd; Tatiana Tenise Matthews | Syd | 2:32 |
| 3. | "Fast Car" | Brandon Hodge; Naji Kareen Lomax; Shawntoni Ajanae Nichols; Shonn Hinton; Syd; Troy Taylor | Troy Taylor; Brandon "B.A.M." Hodge; Raymond Hinton | 3:30 |
| 4. | "Right Track (feat. Smino)" | Christopher Smith Jr.; Denzel Mbeng Ayuk-Okata; Paul Mond; Syd | ForteBowie | 2:38 |
| 5. | "Sweet" | Javonte Pollard; Nichols; Syd | Syd | 2:30 |
| 6. | "Control" | Rodney Jerkins; Syd | Rodney Jerkins | 2:20 |
| 7. | "No Way" | Dave Rosser; Nicholas Eaholtz; Syd | Nick Green; Dave Rosser | 3:03 |
| 8. | "Getting Late" | Syd | Syd | 3:10 |
| 9. | "Out Loud (feat. Kehlani)" | Rob Mandell; Kehlani Parrish; Nichols; Syd; Tatiana Tenise Matthews | Syd, G Koop | 3:23 |
| 10. | "Heartfelt Freestyle" | Denzel Mbeng Ayuk-Okata; Laura Lee Ochoa; Mark Stefan Speer; Syd | ForteBowie | 2:25 |
| 11. | "BMHWDY" | Rose Marie Tan; Steve Lacy; Syd | Steve Lacy | 3:07 |
| 12. | "Goodbye My Love" | Daniel Stanfill; Syd | Biloba | 2:14 |
| 13. | "Missing Out" | Syd | Syd | 4:00 |
| Total length: | | | | 38:55 |
