= Broken Hearts Club =

Broken Hearts Club may refer to:

- The Broken Hearts Club, a 2000 film
- Broken Hearts Club (album), a 2022 album by Syd
