= Super 3 =

Super 3 may refer to:

- Super3, the Catalan language television channel
- Super3 Series, an Australian motor racing series
- The Super 3, an American hip hop duo
