= All About Me (Syd song) =

Single by Syd

from the album Fin
- Released: January 11, 2017
- Recorded: 2016
- Genre: Hip hop; trap; R&B
- Length: 3:32
- Label: Columbia
- Songwriter: Sydney Bennett
- Producer: Steve Lacy

Syd singles chronology
"All About Me" (2017)	"Body" (2017)

Music video
- "All About Me" on YouTube

"All About Me" is a song by American singer and songwriter Syd. It was released on January 11, 2017, as the lead single from her debut album Fin.

== Composition and lyrics ==
Production of the song was handled by Steve Lacy, a fellow member of The Internet. The beat features hazy synth tones, with "heavy-kicking 808 bass and skittering hi-hats". Lyrically, the song mixes braggadocio with lines about keeping a close support circle, such as, "Take care of the family that you came with". Throughout, Syd uses a half-sung, half-rapped delivery.

== Music video ==
The music video, released on January 12, 2017, consists of Syd performing the lyrics in a warehouse. It features cameos from Odd Future members Tyler, The Creator, Hodgy Beats, and Mike G.
