= Always Never Home =

EP by Syd
- Released: September 7, 2017
- Length: 10:55
- Label: The Internet; Columbia
- Producer: Anonxmous; Full Crate; Gwen Bunn; Jameel "Kintaro" Bruner; Ricci Riera

Syd chronology
Fin (2017)	Always Never Home (2017)	Broken Hearts Club (2022)

Always Never Home is an extended play by American singer Syd. It was released on September 7, 2017, via Columbia Records for streaming and digital download. The project succeeds Syd's debut album Fin (2017), released seven months prior. Consisting of three tracks, the EP includes production from Ricci Riera, Full Crate, Anonxmous, Gwenn Bunn and Kintaro.

== Background ==
The EP's release date was revealed by Syd on Twitter. The Always Never Home Tour was also announced for October to December 2017.

== Singles ==
The first single off the EP, titled "Bad Dream / No Looking Back", was released as an appreciation to the solar eclipse of August 21, 2017. It was produced by Gwen Bunn and Ricci Riera. Syd said on Twitter "Play this while you watch the eclipse." The single was advertised as a "part of the upcoming feature soundtrack Always Never Home."

== Track listing ==
Credits adapted from Tidal.

No.	Title	Writer(s)	Producer(s)	Length
1.	"Moving Mountains"	Sydney Bennett; Jonathan Solone-Myvett; Javonte Pollard	AnonXmous	2:39
2.	"Bad Dream / No Looking Back"	Bennett; Gwendolyn Bunn; Ricci Riera; Donald DeGrate; Devell Moore; Shirley Murdock; Larry Troutman; Roger Troutman	Gwen Bunn; Riera	4:54
3.	"On the Road"	Bennett; Narek Nikoghosyan; Jameel "Kintaro" Bruner	Full Crate; Kintaro	3:12
Total length:				10:55
