= The Jet Age of Tomorrow =

American musical duo

- Also known as: The Super 3
- Origin: Atlanta, Georgia, United States
- Genres: Acid jazz; trip hop; alternative hip hop; electronica; neo-psychedelia
- Years active: 2007–2013; 2017
- Labels: Odd Future; Sony; RED; 5th Echelon Jet Repair Co.
- Spinoff of: Odd Future
- Past members: Matt Martians; Pyramid Vritra
- Website: oddfuture.com

The Jet Age of Tomorrow was an American production duo from Atlanta, Georgia and a sub-group of hip hop collective Odd Future that consists of producer-singer Matt Martians, and producer-rapper Pyramid Vritra. According to Martians, the group's music originated from instrumentals turned down by Tyler, the Creator and Hodgy, who liked the tracks Martians sent them, but could not use them in their own music. Outside of their work with the Jet Age, Martians is a member of The Internet with Odd Future member Syd, while Vritra is a member of his own hip hop collective, NRK (Nobody Really Knows).

== History ==
The Super 3 was a production trio created by Matt Martians, which consisted of himself and fictional members Betty Vasolean and Yoshi Jankins, Jr., inspired by the virtual band Gorillaz. Publishing his beats through Myspace, Martians was eventually discovered by Tyler, the Creator and invited to join the Odd Future collective, alongside Casey Veggies, Hodgy and Left Brain, where he produced the songs "Laxin", "Bubble Gum", "Money Talk" and "Our Story" for their debut mixtape, The Odd Future Tape, released on November 15, 2008. Together with short-term member brandUn DeShay, they released The Super D3Shay EP on April 29, 2009.

Later that year, Martians invited his friend and fellow Atlanta producer Pyramid Vritra to come to Los Angeles and join Odd Future as well. The duo eventually changed their name to the Jet Age of Tomorrow, releasing their debut EP Can I Hold Your Hand?, and both their first and second albums, Voyager and Journey to the 5th Echelon, in 2010.

A music video for the second album's single "Wonderland", was released on February 4, 2011.

Vritra released his first full-length solo album, Pyramid on August 7, 2012, featuring Martians on the track "Icecream 4 U".

The duo's third album, JellyFish Mentality, was released on May 24, 2013. Four days later, the JellyFish Mentality: Bonus EP was released with four additional tracks.

In 2017, Martians released his debut solo album The Drum Chord Theory on January 27, and the duo released their fourth and final album God's Poop or Clouds? on September 15 on Martians new record label "5th Echelon Jet Repair Co". In an interview with The Fader, Martians stated that he doesn't think there will be another Jet Age album, saying "I'm content with Jet Age — my solo albums are an extension of it now”.

== Discography ==
Studio albums

- Voyager (2010)
- Journey to the 5th Echelon (2010)
- JellyFish Mentality (2013)
- God's Poop or Clouds? (2017)

Extended plays

- Can I Hold Your Hand? (2010)
- JellyFish Mentality: Bonus EP (2013)

=== with Odd Future ===
Studio albums

- The OF Tape Vol. 2 (2012)

Mixtapes

- The Odd Future Tape (2008)

Compilations

- 12 Odd Future Songs (2011)

=== with brandUn DeShay (as The Super D3Shay) ===
Mixtapes

- The Super D3Shay (2009)

== Production discography ==
=== 2008 ===
Odd Future - The Odd Future Tape

- 03. "Laxin'" (performed by Hodgy)
- 05. "Bubble Gum" (performed by Hodgy, Tyler, the Creator and Casey Veggies)
- 09. "Money Talk" (performed by Casey Veggies and Hodgy)
- 10. "Our Story" (performed by Hodgy)

=== 2009 ===
The Super D3Shay - The Super D3Shay

- 01. "I Want Eargasms"
- 02. "Radio Love"
- 03. "The Last Martians"
- 05. "Searching For"
- 06. "Bad Day"
- 07. "We Were" (produced with brandUn DeShay)
- 08. "Where Is Home"
- 09. "Sign Off"

=== 2010 ===
The Jet Age of Tomorrow - Can I Hold Your Hand?

- 01. "Can I Hold Your Hand?"
- 02. "Svetlana, Can I Hold Your Hand?"
- 03. "The Knight Hawk (Redux)"
- 04. "Good Knight" (performed by Tyler, the Creator)
- 05. "Shut Up, Marsha"
- 06. "FIVE"
- 07. "The Call!"

The Jet Age of Tomorrow - Voyager

- 01. "Welcome Aboard Voyager"
- 02. "Can I Hold Your Hand?"
- 03. "Friday"
- 04. "But She Not My Lover"
- 05. "Don't Tell the Mermaids"
- 06. "Rapido Eye Movement"
- 07. "Revenge of the Ranger Wranglers"
- 08. "The Knight Hawk"
- 09. "Hercules Cup"
- 10. "Orange Juice Simpson"
- 11. "Strobe Light
- 12. "My Good Girl"
- 13. "They Dove Through the Ice Into the Unfathomable Depths of the Abyss"
- 14. "Submarine"
- 15. "Lisa, Where Have You Been?"
- 16. "Europa"

The Jet Age of Tomorrow - Journey to the 5th Echelon

- 01. "Green Stars (Intro)"
- 02. "5th Echelon"
- 03. "Pack Up"
- 04. "Love In The Purple Forest"
- 05. "Dust Off" (featuring Hodgy Beats and Mike G)
- 06. "Thump Thump"
- 07. "The Fallen Angels" (produced with Left Brain)
- 08. "Sunburst" (produced with Tyler Major)
- 09. "LunchBox" (featuring Vince Staples and JQ)
- 10. "Wonderland"
- 13. "The Finer Things" (featuring Om'Mas Keith)
- 14. "Protozoa (Yow!)"
- 15. "Burfday"
- 16. "Sleep!"
- 17. "Welcome Home Son" (featuring Casey Veggies and Tyler, The Creator)
- 18. "A Happy Ending" (produced with Kream Team)
- 19. "Her Secrets" (Bonus track)
- 20. "Lets Make A Porno?" (Bonus Track)
- 21. "Take Me To Atlantis (Bonus Track)

=== 2011 ===
Odd Future - 12 Odd Future Songs

- 04. "Welcome Home Son" (performed by The Jet Age of Tomorrow featuring Casey Veggies and Tyler, The Creator)
- 09. "But She's Not My Lover" (performed by The Jet Age of Tomorrow)

=== 2012 ===
Odd Future - The OF Tape Vol. 2

- 04. "Ya Know" (performed by The Internet)

=== 2013 ===
The Jet Age of Tomorrow - JellyFish Mentality

- 01. "Warping Walls"
- 02. "Special K (Wombat)"
- 03. "Desert N' The Dark (JAOT Dub)" (featuring The Stepkids)
- 04. "ON!"
- 05. "Juney Jones" (featuring Mac Miller and Speak!)
- 06. "Panic On Pluto"
- 07. "Not So Scary" (featuring Kilo Kish)
- 08. "Love In Water"
- 09. "Lily Pads"
- 10. "A Place Where Lovers Go" (featuring Jesse Boykins III)
- 11. "Machines Machines"
- 12. "One Take" (featuring Earl Sweatshirt and Casey Veggies)
- 13. "SuperFINE"
- 14. "Mushy"
- 15. "The Door's Door"
- 16. "Asia" (featuring Mike G)
- 17. "Squares"
- 18. "Wonderful World" (featuring Domo Genesis and Vince Staples)
- 19. "Naked" (featuring Hodgy)
- 20. "Airport"
- 21. "Telephones"

The Jet Age of Tomorrow - JellyFish Mentality: Bonus EP

- 01. "De-Generic"
- 02. "Bloo Moon"
- 03. "Sherm Scissors" (produced with Caleb Stone)
- 04. "Delta"

=== 2017 ===
The Jet Age of Tomorrow - God's Poop or Clouds?

- 01. "Summer is Ending"
- 02. "The Long Way Home" (featuring Syd)
- 03. "Escape City"
- 04. "The Jaunt"
- 05. "Friday Night / the World's Ending"
- 06. "Wool Glasses"
- 07. "Ain't a Party"
- 08. "Buzzin'"
- 09. "Chance" (featuring India Shawn and MarkUsFree)
- 10. "1 A.M"
- 11. "LocoMotive"
- 12. "Dis Far Witcha'"
- 13. "Fly Like Me" (featuring Zack Villere and MarkUsFree)
- 14. "What Reality?"
- 15. "Come on Wit Me Gurl"
