= Fin (Syd album) =

Studio album by Syd
- Released: February 3, 2017
- Recorded: 2015–16
- Studios: The Loft; Haze's Room; McCadden Enterprises; Rahki's Room
- Genres: Alternative R&B; neo soul; hip hop
- Length: 37:11
- Label: Columbia
- Producers: Flip; Nick Green; HazeBanga; Hit-Boy; JGramm; Anthony Kilhoffer; Steve Lacy; MeLo-X; Rahki; Isiah Salazar; Syd

Syd chronology
Fin (2017)	Always Never Home (2017)

Singles from Fin
- 1. "All About Me" Released: January 11, 2017; 2. "Body" Released: January 24, 2017

Fin is the debut solo studio album by American R&B singer Syd. It was released on February 3, 2017, by Columbia Records.

== Background ==
After Ego Death, the members of the Internet decided that they would venture on solo projects to flesh out their individual styles. When speaking about what the album would entail, Syd stated:

"This album is not that deep, but I feel like this is my descent into the depth I want the band to get to... For me, this is like an in-between thing — maybe get a song on the radio, maybe make some money, have some new shit to perform."

The album has a more pop-influenced feel in comparison to her output with the Internet. However, Syd states that she has always been influenced by pop, and that the album is inspired by popular artists from her time, including Usher and Brandy. Influences of trap also appear throughout, most notably on the single "All About Me".

"All About Me" was released as Fin's lead single on January 11, 2017. A music video for the song was released a day earlier on Syd's Vevo page. On January 24, "Body" was released as the album's second single. The song's audio was also released on the singer's Vevo page.

== Release and reception ==
Professional ratings
Aggregate scores
Source	Rating
AnyDecentMusic?	7.7/10
Metacritic	81/100
Review scores
Source	Rating
AllMusic	3.5/5 stars
Clash	8/10
Exclaim!	8/10
The Guardian	4/5 stars
The Line of Best Fit	8/10
The New Zealand Herald	4/5 stars
Pitchfork	8.1/10
PopMatters	8/10
State	4/5
Vice (Expert Witness)	A−

Fin was released by Columbia Records on February 3, 2017, to widespread critical acclaim. At Metacritic, which assigns a normalized rating out of 100 to reviews from mainstream publications, the album received an average score of 81, based on 10 reviews. Reviewing Fin for NPR, Lars Gotrich wrote that Syd "has an affinity for the '90s R&B singers who kept their emotions open and voices close, like Aaliyah (see 'Know') or the ladies in TLC ('Smile More', 'Nothin' To Somethin'') — embracing the limitations of their range, but finding the core of the performance via self-styled confidence". In Vice, Robert Christgau found the singer distinct from contemporary R&B's "voice-plus-sound" aesthetic, particularly because of her "soft and slender" voice, "her brave sighs and whispers", and "how easily her voice carries this music unaugmented by her former guitar and drum kit". He appreciated her themes of financial success and especially love, while naming "Dollar Bills" the album's highlight.

=== Accolades ===
Publication	Accolade	Rank	Ref.
Complex	50 Best Albums of 2017	11	
Exclaim!	Exclaim!'s Top 10 Soul and R&B Albums of 2017	9	
Highsnobiety	Top 25 Albums of 2017	24	
The Independent	Top 30 Albums of 2017	8	
The Line of Best Fit	Top 50 Albums of 2017	19	
Okayplayer	Top 15 Albums of 2017	15	
Pitchfork	The 50 Best Albums of 2017	36	
Thrillist	Top 40 Albums of 2017	4	

== Track listing ==
Fin track listing
No.	Title	Lyrics	Music	Producer(s)	Length
1.	"Shake Em Off"	Syd; Nick Green	Sydney Bennett; Chauncey Hollis, Jr.; Nicholas Eaholtz	Hit-Boy	3:00
2.	"Know"	Green; Rose Marie Tan; Syd	Eaholtz; Tan; Green; Bennett; Michael Davidson	Green	3:35
3.	"No Complaints"	Syd	Bennett	Syd	1:13
4.	"Nothin to Somethin"	Syd	Bennett	Syd	3:29
5.	"All About Me"	Syd	Bennett; Steve Lacy	Lacy	3:31
6.	"Smile More"	Syd	Bennett	Syd	4:01
7.	"Got Her Own"	Syd; Green	Bennett; Eaholtz; Rashad Muhammad; Isiah Salazar	HazeBanga; Salazar	3:06
8.	"Drown in It"	Syd; Green	Bennett; Eaholtz; Anthony Kilhoffer; Julian Gramma	Kilhoffer; JGramm	1:10
9.	"Body"	Syd; Green; Tan	Bennett; Eaholtz; Tan; Sean Rhoden	MeLo-X	4:22
10.	"Dollar Bills" (featuring Steve Lacy)	Syd; Lacy	Bennett; Lacy; Ronald Colson	Flip; Lacy	3:08
11.	"Over" (featuring 6lack)	Syd; Green	Bennett; Eaholtz; Muhammad	HazeBanga	3:11
12.	"Insecurities"	Syd; Green; Brent Faiyaz	Bennett; Eaholtz; Columbus Smith III; Faiyaz; Keith Askey	Rahki	3:25

== Personnel ==
Musicians

- Syd – vocals
- Michael Davidson – additional keyboards (track 2)
- Rose Marie Tan – background vocals (tracks 2, 9)
- Nick Green – background vocals (tracks 2, 12)
- Lamont Savor – guitar (track 6)
- Steve Lacy – guitar (track 10)
- Rahki – bass, drum programming (track 12)
- Brent Faiyaz – background vocals (track 12)
- Keith Askey – guitar (track 12)
- Robert Glasper – piano (track 12)

Technical

- Colin Leonard – mastering
- Fabian Marasciullo – mixing
- Syd – recording (tracks 1–6, 9–11)
- Todd Cooper – recording (track 7)
- Anthony Kilhoffer – recording (track 8)
- Stuart Schenck – recording (track 12)
- McCoy Socalgargoyle – recording assistance

Visuals

- Justin Brown – photography

== Charts ==
Chart (2017)	Peak position
New Zealand Heatseekers Albums (RMNZ)	10
US Billboard 200	75
US Top R&B/Hip-Hop Albums (Billboard)	32
