= The Drum Chord Theory =

Studio album by Matt Martians
- Released: January 27, 2017
- Recorded: 2016
- Genres: Trip hop; neo soul; experimental hip hop; psychedelic R&B; electronic
- Length: 41:52
- Label: Three Quarter
- Producers: Matt Martians; Tyler, The Creator; Kari Faux; Steve Lacy; KiNTaRO; Tay Dreamin'

Matt Martians chronology
The Drum Chord Theory (2017)	The Last Party (2019)

Singles from The Drum Chord Theory
- 1. "Diamond in Da Ruff" Released: January 18, 2017; 2. "Dent Jusay" Released: January 26, 2017

The Drum Chord Theory is the debut solo studio album by musician Matt Martians, member of groups and sub-groups The Internet, Odd Future, The Jet Age of Tomorrow, The Super D3shay, and Sweaty Martians. It was released on January 27, 2017 by Three Quarter Records.

Professional ratings
Review scores
Source	Rating
Pitchfork	6.0/10

== Background ==
Following the release of Ego Death, Syd and Matt Martians announced that they would release solo projects before making new music with The Internet. When describing the music that would be on the album, Martians said that it was "very weird and wonky but it’s very chord-heavy and melodic". He also stated that the themes presented on the album, such as uncertainties and ideals about love, come together to tell a story, essentially making it a concept album. "It's really an album that tells a story… It's a guy, he's having problems with a girl. Then he takes some acid," he explained in an interview.

The first half of the album has been described as a smooth and jazzy neo soul production, before a more psychedelic approach to this sound in the latter half. On the album's sound, Martians said "I got the sounds from it years ago when I started taking acid—just taking myself through the journey of being one with myself and being able to sit down and make an album because making an album is very hard. It takes a lot of things out of you emotionally". Although the album is a solo effort, longtime collaborators and friends, including Syd, Tyler, The Creator, and Steve Lacy, make contributions to some songs.

== Track listing ==
The Drum Chord Theory
No.	Title	Writer(s)	Producer(s)	Length
1.	"Spend The Night / If You Were My Girlfriend"	Matt Martians	Matt Martians	3:40
2.	"What Love Is"	Martians; Steven Lacy	Steve Lacy	3:47
3.	"Where Are Yo Friends?"	Martians	Martians	3:20
4.	"Baby Girl"	Martians	Martians; Kari Faux	2:45
5.	"Southern Isolation"	Martians	Martians; Lacy	3:51
6.	"Found Me Some Acid Tonight" (featuring Steve Lacy)	Martians; Lacy	Martians; Lacy	0:51
7.	"Alotta Women / Useless" (featuring Kari Faux)	Martians; Faux	Martians	4:36
8.	"Down"	Martians	Martians	2:48
9.	"Dent Jusay" (featuring Syd and Steve Lacy)	Martians; Sydney Bennett; Lacy	Tyler Gregory Okonma	2:37
10.	"Callin' On Me"	Martians	Martians; Okonma	5:49
11.	"Diamond in da Ruff"	Martians	Martians; Lacy	3:44
12.	"Elevators" (Bonus)	Martians	Martians; Tay Dreamin'	4:04

Notes

- "Diamond in da Ruff" contains the hidden track "Feelin" (produced by KiNTaRO and Steve Lacy)
