= Oldie (song) =

2012 song by Odd Future

Song by Odd Future

from the album The OF Tape Vol. 2
- Released: March 20, 2012
- Genre: Alternative hip hop
- Length: 10:36
- Label: Odd Future Records
- Songwriters: Tyler Okonma; Gerard Long; Vyron Turner; Michael Griffin II; Dominique Cole; Christopher Breaux; Davon Wilson; Thebe Kgositsile (uncredited)
- Producers: Tyler, the Creator

Music video
- "Oldie" on YouTube

"Oldie" is the eighteenth and final track on the Odd Future album The OF Tape Vol. 2. The song features members Tyler, the Creator, Hodgy Beats, Left Brain, Mike G, Domo Genesis, Frank Ocean, Jasper Dolphin, and Earl Sweatshirt. It was produced by Tyler, the Creator, and was released on March 20, 2012.

== Music video ==
The music video for Oldie was released on March 20, 2012 on the official OFWGKTA YouTube channel and features the members rapping at the camera while dancing and moshing. The music video was shot at a Terry Richardson photoshoot in Milk Studios, a photography studio located in Los Angeles and New York City. Originally, there were no plans on shooting a music video for Oldie, however, at the photoshoot, the crew decided to rap their verses at the camera and upload it to YouTube.

== Critical reception ==
Oldie received mainly positive reviews from multiple sources, with Jack Riedy at Stereogum stating that "Oldie" concludes the tape with the purest distillation of Odd Future's appeal as a group.", as well as him calling it a version of "Stairway to Heaven" for "hip-hop fans who put 666 in their gamertag and got stuck with it to adulthood."

Pitchfork writer Ian Cohen complained about the length of Oldie, saying "Oldie" probably doesn’t need to be ten and a half minutes long.", and providing ways he thought the song could've been "tighter", stating that speeding up the BPM, or having Earl's verse be the closing verse, and cutting out Jasper Dolphin's verse entirely. However, he would follow that up with more positive notes, stating that Oldie could accomplish what previous tracks made by Tyler, the Creator couldn't, such as Window, and Sandwitches, both being tracks on Tyler, the Creator's 2011 album Goblin.

Aylin Zafar at BuzzFeed would praise the song, with the title calling it "2012's Feel-Good Song of the Year" as well as stating that "Few songs or videos make me as happy as "Oldie." and "It might seem strange that one of the feel-good songs of the year would come from a group that first became known for surreal raps with lines referencing sexual violence," referencing the collective's earlier projects like Odd Future's previous project, Radical, amongst other early OFWGKTA projects. Zafar's review would conclude with the claim that "…it’s a reminder that music is supposed to be fun." and "It's hard not to feel like Odd Future have figured out something the rest of us are still struggling with. Why not pursue your passions?"

On October 7, 2019, Pitchfork ranked "Oldie" at 160 out of 200 on their "The 200 Best Songs of the 2010s" article.
