= Matt Martians =

American record producer, illustrator, singer and songwriter (born 1988)

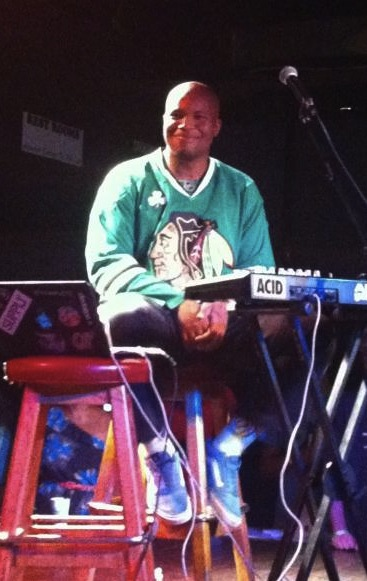
- Matt Martians in September 2012.

Background information
- Born: Matthew Robert Martin; September 12, 1988 (age 38); Atlanta, Georgia, United States
- Genres: Trip hop; neo soul; alternative R&B
- Occupations: Record producer; illustrator; singer; songwriter
- Years active: 2007–present
- Labels: Columbia; Odd Future; Three Quarter; 5th Echelon Jet Repair Co.
- Member of: The Internet
- Formerly of: The Jet Age of Tomorrow; Odd Future
- Website: oddfuture.com

Matthew Robert Martin (born September 12, 1988), known professionally as Matt Martians, is an American record producer, illustrator, singer and songwriter. Aside from his solo career, Martians is a founding member of the hip hop music collective Odd Future and the alternative R&B band The Internet, and is one half of the production duo The Jet Age of Tomorrow (formerly The Super 3) with Pyramid Vritra, a sub-group of Odd Future.

== Early life ==
Matthew Robert Martin was born on September 12, 1988, in Atlanta, Georgia. His mother was a lead singer in a choir. His brother, Mitch, worked as an A&R manager for Outkast and their record label Purple Ribbon Records, as well as Janelle Monáe. Martians said his music taste was influenced by the artists his brother managed. Martians also listed A Tribe Called Quest, N.E.R.D., and The Commodores as inspirations.

== Musical career ==
=== 2007-2009: Beginnings, Super 3, and Odd Future ===
Martians started making music in his sophomore year of college when he was 18. He saved $2,000 to buy music production equipment including a MacBook. Martians started publishing his earliest beats on Myspace under the alias "The Super 3". Martians aspired to create a virtual band akin to Gorillaz, representing the alias as a trio consisting of himself, and two fictional characters "Betty Vasolean" and "Yoshi Jankins. Jr."

Odd Future members Tyler, the Creator and Hodgy Beats discovered Martians' Myspace account, and eventually invited him to join as a founding member of the group. Under the Super 3 alias, Martians produced songs for Odd Future's debut mixtape The Odd Future Tape, alongside other Odd Future collective projects.

In 2009, with short-term member BrandUn DeShay, Martians began work on an EP "The Super D3Shay". The EP released on April 29, 2009. After DeShay fell out with the Odd Future collective, Martians re-released the EP as "The Super 3 EP (Instrumentals)" on May 15, 2011, removing DeShay's contributions.

=== 2010 - 2013: Jet Age Of Tomorrow and The Internet ===
In 2008, Hal Williams, later known as Pyramid Vritra, contacted Martians online to request his help mixing and mastering his own collective's mixtape, "The Goodwill Tape". Martians eventually invited Williams move to Los Angeles and create music under his mentorship. Martians and Williams eventually formed their own Odd Future sub-group "The Jet Age of Tomorrow," and created two self-released albums as a duo including Voyager and Journey to the 5th Echelon. The song "The Knight Hawk" from the former was sampled on Kendrick Lamar's song "A.D.H.D". In 2017, Martians accused Sounwave, Lamar's producer, of non-payment of the sample. After the release of their initial projects Martians and Williams were evicted from their apartment, obliging Williams to leave Los Angeles for a year, disconnecting them from Odd Future and affiliated projects.

Syd the Kyd and Matt Martians formed another Odd Future sub-group, The Internet, and released the album, Purple Naked Ladies, on December 20, 2011.

Martians and Williams were later credited as writing and producing a song from Odd Future's studio album,The OF Tape Vol. 2 titled "Ya Know".

Martians and Williams released a third mixtape, "The Jellyfish Mentality," in 2013, with an accompanying EP including bonus tracks That same year, The Internet released their sophomore album Feel Good.

=== 2014 - Present: Jet Age inactivity, Ego Death, Solo career ===
Following the Internet's 2015 album Ego Death, Syd and Martians announced there would be new solo albums from the members of the band. Martians also co-produced the outro track "Failsafe" to Williams' EP "IM2S+MW" as the Jet Age Of Tomorrow. This marked the first collaboration between the two since Williams signed to Stones Throw Records.

Martians released his first studio album The Drum Chord Theory in 2017 under Three Quarter records, which featured his own production, alongside instrumentation from Tyler, the Creator, Syd, Steve Lacy, and KiNTaRO. Martians and Williams released the final Jet Age album in the same year titled "God's Poop or Clouds?". Martians self-released the project via his own record label "5th Echelon Jet Repair Co." Martians later said in an interview with The Fader, he does not intend to create more projects as part of the group, and that he considers his solo albums "an extension of it."

The Internet released Hive Mind, on July 20, 2018. Despite claiming The Drum Chord Theory would be his only solo project, Martians released his sophomore album The Last Party in 2019. The album featured artists such as, fellow Internet member Steve Lacy, and Baby Rose.

In 2021 Martians removed his public social media accounts and moved from Los Angeles to return to Atlanta. Martians self-released two albums under his 5th Echelon Jet Repair Co label, "Going Normal" and "Butterfly Don't Visit Caterpillar". Neither album received commercial promotion nor featured previous collaborators affiliated with The Internet and Odd Future. The latter project, Butterfly Don't Visit Caterpillar, was Martians first entirely self-produced solo effort.

Martians later appeared on other artists' projects including Mia Gladstone's "EMPATHY" and Steve Lacy's 2Gether from his album Gemini Rights. On March 16 of 2023, Martians returned to solo music with the single "Waiting For". In December of that year, Martians teased his 5th studio album "Matt's Missing" with a single "New Matt Album Jan. 12", however he accidentally released the album instantly due to self-managing the release process using the platform DistroKid, and took down the release some time later. The album officially released on January 11, 2024, with slight differences.

== Discography ==
=== Solo ===
Studio albums

- The Drum Chord Theory (2017)
- The Last Party (2019)
- Going Normal (2021)
- Butterfly Don't Visit Caterpillar (2021)
- Matt's Missing (2024)

Extended plays

- Bonus Going Normal (2021)

=== with Odd Future ===
Studio albums

- The OF Tape Vol. 2 (2012)

Compilations

- 12 Odd Future Songs (2011)

Mixtapes

- The Odd Future Tape (2008)

=== with The Jet Age of Tomorrow ===
Mixtapes

- Voyager (2010)
- Journey to the 5th Echelon (2010)
- The JellyFish Mentality LP (2013)
- God's Poop or Clouds? (2017)

Extended plays

- Can I Hold Your Hand? (2010)
- JellyFish Mentality: Bonus EP (2013)

=== As The Super 3 ===
Extended plays

- The Super D3Shay (2009) (With BrandUn DeShay)
- The Super 3 EP (Instrumentals) (2011)

=== with The Internet ===
Studio albums

- Purple Naked Ladies (2011)
- Feel Good (2013)
- Ego Death (2015)
- Hive Mind (2018)

Extended plays

- Purple Naked Ladies: 4 Bonus Songs (2012)
- Ego Death (Bonus Tracks) (2015)

=== with Raleigh Ritchie and The Internet ===
Extended plays

- Black and Blue Point Two (2014)

== Videography ==
List of videos as a solo artist
Title	Director(s)	Album	Year
"Dent Jusay / Where Are Yo Friends?" (feat. Syd and Steve Lacy)	Matt Martians	The Drum Chord Theory	2017
