= Purple Naked Ladies =

Studio album by The Internet
- Released: December 20, 2011
- Recorded: 2011
- Genre: Trip hop; hip-hop soul; R&B
- Length: 41:34
- Label: Odd Future; RED
- Producer: Anthony Life; Frank Ocean; Frisco; The Internet; Left Brain; Matt Martians; Patrick the Great; Pyramid Vritra; Robin Hannibal; Tyler, the Creator

The Internet chronology
Purple Naked Ladies (2011)	Feel Good (2013)

Singles from Purple Naked Ladies
- 1. "Love Song -1" Released: September 24, 2011; 2. "They Say" Released: October 4, 2011; 3. "Cocaine" Released: November 8, 2011; 4. "Fastlane" Released: January 19, 2012

Purple Naked Ladies is the debut studio album by American soul band The Internet, a duo consisting of Syd tha Kyd and Matt Martians of Odd Future at the time. The digital version of the album was released on December 20, 2011, with a physical copy, with bonus tracks released on January 31, 2012. The album is the first physically released album on Odd Future's own record label Odd Future Records with distribution via RED Distribution.

== Personnel ==
The Internet is formed of Odd Future members Syd the Kyd, the group's sound engineer, audio mixer, and live DJ, and Matt Martians, one half of The Jet Age of Tomorrow. The album features collaborations with fellow Odd Future members Left Brain, Mike G, and Pyramid Vritra as well as other guest artists Tay Walker, Kilo Kish, and Coco O.

== Singles ==
The album's first single, "Love Song -1" was released on September 14, 2011. The second single, "They Say", which features Tay Walker, was released on October 4, 2011, though before its single release, it was included on the Odd Future compilation album 12 Odd Future Songs. The third single, "Cocaine", which features Left Brain, had its music video premiere on Odd Future's YouTube page on October 31, 2011. It was released as a single to the iTunes Store on November 8, 2011, as a 3 track EP including "Love Song -1" and "They Say" as tracks 2 and 3 respectively. The fourth single, "Fastlane", was released on January 19, 2012.

== Release ==
The album's cover artwork was released on November 8, 2011. A bonus EP was later released for free on the official Odd Future website. It was intended to be packaged with the album, but due to a manufacturing issue, it was left out.

== Reception ==
Professional ratings
Aggregate scores
Source	Rating
Metacritic	55/100
Review scores
Source	Rating
AllMusic	3.5/5 stars
The A.V. Club	C+
Beats Per Minute	38%
Consequence of Sound	1.5/5 stars
The Guardian	3/5 stars
No Ripcord	6/10
Now	3/5 stars
The Observer	3/5 stars
Pitchfork Media	6.0/10
Rolling Stone	3/5 stars
Spin	7/10
Sputnikmusic	2.5/5 stars

The album received mixed reviews, scoring an average of 55 out of 100 on Metacritic based on 21 reviews. The album peaked at number 31 on the US Billboard Heatseekers Albums charts on January 7, 2012.

== Track listing ==
The track listing was reported by Pretty Much Amazing on November 8, 2011.

No.	Title	Writer(s)	Producer(s)	Length
1.	"Violet Nude Women"	Sydney Bennett; Matthew Martin	The Internet	3:27
2.	"They Say / Shangrila" (featuring Tay Walker)	S. Bennett; Tay Walker	The Internet; Frisco*	4:48
3.	"She DGAF"	S. Bennett; M. Martin; Christopher Breaux	The Internet; Frank Ocean	3:28
4.	"Cunt"	S. Bennett; M. Martin	The Internet	2:19
5.	"Cocaine / Tevie" (featuring Left Brain)	S. Bennett; M. Martin; Anthony Negrete; Vyron Turner	The Internet; Left Brain*	4:32
6.	"Ode to a Dream" (featuring Kilo Kish and Coco O.)	Hal Williams; S. Bennett; M. Martin; Coco Owino; Lakisha Robinson	Pyramid Vritra; The Internet	4:09
7.	"Gurl" (featuring Pyramid Vritra)	S. Bennett; M. Martin; H. Williams	Matt Martians	2:51
8.	"Lovesong^{−1}"	S. Bennett	Frisco	1:29
9.	"Lincoln" (featuring Left Brain and Mike G)	S. Bennett; M. Martin; Mike Griffin II; V. Turner	The Internet	2:08
10.	"Web of Me"	S. Bennett; M. Martin	Frisco	2:48
11.	"She Knows"	S. Bennett; M. Martin; V. Turner	Matt Martians; Left Brain	2:10
12.	"Fastlane"	Patrick Paige II; S. Bennett; M. Martin; A. Negrete	Patrick the Great	3:43
13.	"Visions" (featuring Coco O.)	V. Turner; M. Martin; P. Paige II; S. Bennett; A. Negrete; C. Owino	Left Brain; The Internet; Patrick the Great	1:32
14.	"The Garden"	S. Bennett; M. Martin	The Internet	2:10

Bonus EP
No.	Title	Writer(s)	Producer(s)	Length
1.	"Lonely Notes" (featuring Quadron)	M. Martin; R. Hannibal	Matt Martians; Robin Hannibal	3:08
2.	"Live It Up"	T. Okonma	Tyler, the Creator	3:59
3.	"Partners in Crime"	S. Bennett	Syd tha Kyd	2:56
4.	"Of It"	M. Martin; S. Bennett	The Internet	4:50

- "They Say" written by Sydney Bennett and Tay Walker; produced by The Internet. "Shangrila" written by Sydney Bennett; produced by Frisco.
- "Cocaine" written by Sydney Bennett, Matthew Martin, Anthony Negrete and Vyron Turner; produced by The Internet. "Tevie" written by Vyron Turner, Sydney Bennett and Matthew Martin; produced by Left Brain & The Internet.
- Frisco is Syd Tha Kyd.
