= Syd (singer) =

American singer (born 1992)

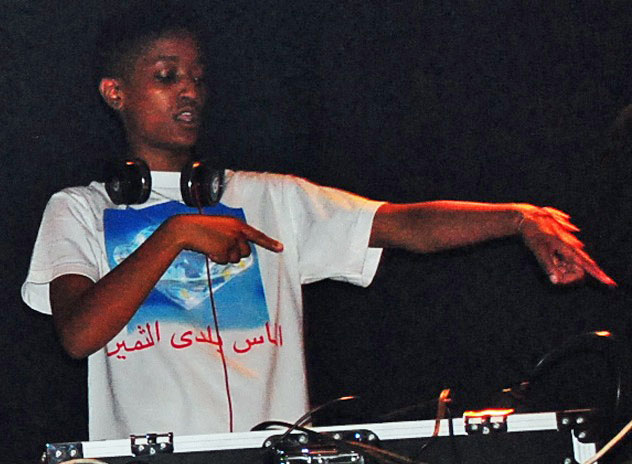
- Syd in 2011

Background information
- Also known as: Syd tha Kyd; Frisco
- Born: Sydney Loren Bennett; April 23, 1992 (age 34); Los Angeles, California, U.S.
- Genres: Alternative R&B; neo soul; hip hop
- Occupations: Singer; songwriter; disc jockey; record producer
- Years active: 2009–present
- Labels: Columbia; Odd Future (former)
- Member of: The Internet
- Formerly of: Odd Future
- Spouse: Ariana Simone (m. 2022)

Sydney Loren Bennett (born April 23, 1992), known professionally as Syd (formerly Syd tha Kyd), is an American singer and songwriter. She initially gained recognition as a member of the alternative hip hop collective Odd Future, and went on to co-found the band The Internet in 2011. In 2017, Bennett released her debut solo album Fin, followed by the EP Always Never Home. She released her second album, Broken Hearts Club, in 2022. In July 2026, she released her third album, Beard.

== Early life ==
Growing up in a musical family influenced Bennett's interest in music. Her mother once aspired to be a DJ and her uncle is Mikey Bennett, an internationally popular reggae producer and studio owner from Jamaica. As she explained, "I began wishing I could take credit for some of my favorite songs. That was when I started to make my own – I only began singing on my own songs when I really started writing." When Bennett was 14, she built a small music studio in her home and worked on sound engineering before getting into production. Her brother is Travis "Taco" Bennett.

For the first half of her high school years, Syd attended Palisades Charter High School. She felt left out and had few friends at Palisades and moved to the Hamilton Music Academy, which she considered a more open-minded school.

== Musical career ==
Syd began making music while she was still living with her parents. Syd's stage name was given to her by her older brother, Ty, as a kid. After growing out of it, she reclaimed the name when she joined Odd Future. Most of the group's original songs were recorded in Syd's house, also known as "The Trap". Syd acted as a DJ and producer for Odd Future. She was the only female member during the group's active years and openly identified as gay, which often put her at odds with the group’s notoriously homophobic and misogynistic lyrics. In 2011, Syd co-founded The Internet, with their debut album, Purple Naked Ladies, releasing the same year. In 2014, Syd opened for Eminem at Wembley Stadium as part of the Odd Future collective.

On January 13, 2017, Syd's debut solo single "All About Me" was released. It was produced by the Internet cohort Steve Lacy. On January 24, 2017, her second solo single "Body" was released in anticipation for her album in collaboration with Columbia Records, Fin, which was released on February 3, 2017. On May 18, 2017, Syd starred together with Korean R&B artist Dean in his music video for their collaboration "Love".

On September 7, 2017, Syd released Always Never Home, a three-track EP. It was the follow-up to her debut solo album Fin.

Syd was featured on Lil Uzi Vert's second studio album Eternal Atake on the song "Urgency", which was released on March 6, 2020. She was featured on the song "When Love's Around" on Zayn's third studio album Nobody Is Listening, which was released on January 15, 2021.

On February 12, 2021, Syd released a single titled "Missing Out" followed by "Fast Car" on July 16, 2021, and "Right Track" on August 10, 2021. Syd's single "Cybah" featuring Lucky Daye was released on March 18, 2022. She followed this release with the announcement of her 2022 Broken Hearts Club Tour with Destin Conrad as the opener.

Syd was credited on "Plastic Off the Sofa", the eighth track on Beyoncé's seventh studio album, Renaissance. Syd also appeared on Duckwrth's single "Ce Soir", which later appeared on his third EP Chrome Bull.

On April 8, 2022, Syd released her second album, Broken Hearts Club. The project began as a collection of love songs, but was completed after Syd's relationship came to an end, culminating in a mix of tracks about love and heartbreak.

She released her third album, Beard, on July 17, 2026. She is scheduled to embark on the North American Beard Tour in support of the album.

== Discography ==
=== Studio albums ===
List of albums, with selected chart positions
Title	Album details	Peak chart positions		
Title	Album details	US	US R&B/HH	US R&B
Fin	Released: February 3, 2017; Label: Columbia; Format: CD, LP, digital download, streaming	75	32	11
Broken Hearts Club	Released: April 8, 2022; Label: Columbia; Format: CD, LP, digital download, streaming	—	—	—
Beard	Released: July 17, 2026; Label: Free Lunch Records/Warner Records; Format: CD, LP, digital download, streaming	—	—	—
"—" denotes a recording that did not chart or was not released in that territory.

=== Extended plays ===
List of extended plays, with selected details
Title	EP details
Always Never Home	Released: September 7, 2017; Label: Columbia; Format: CD, Digital download

=== Mixtapes ===
List of mixtapes, with selected details
Title	Mixtape details
Raunchboots	Released: February 1, 2011; Label: Self-released; Format:Digital download

=== Singles ===
==== As lead artist ====
List of singles as lead artist, showing year released and album name
Title	Year	Peak chart positions	Album
Title	Year	UK	Album
"All About Me"	2017	—	Fin
"Body"	2017	—	Fin
"Birthday" (with Disclosure and Kehlani)	2020	81	Energy
"Missing Out"	2021	—	Broken Hearts Club
"Fast Car"	2021	—	Broken Hearts Club
"Right Track" (with Smino	2021	—	Broken Hearts Club
"Die for This"	2025	—	Non-album single
"—" denotes a recording that did not chart or was not released in that territory.

==== As featured artist ====
Title	Year	Peak chart positions		Album
Title	Year	US	US R&B/HH	Album
"Urgency" (Lil Uzi Vert featuring Syd)	2020	76	47	Eternal Atake

=== Guest appearances ===
List of non-single guest appearances, with other performing artists, showing year released and album name
Title	Year	Artist(s)	Album
"Blow"	2009	Tyler, the Creator	Bastard
"Wakeupfaggot"	2010	Earl Sweatshirt	Earl
"Swag Me Out"	2010	Odd Future, Jasper Dolphin, Left Brain, Tyler, the Creator, Hodgy Beats, Earl Sweatshirt, Mike G, Taco	Radical
"Radicals"	2011	Tyler, the Creator, Taco	Goblin
"Tron Cat"	2011	Tyler, the Creator	Goblin
"Golden"	2011	Tyler, the Creator	Goblin
"Fish"	2011	Tyler, the Creator, Frank Ocean	Goblin
"Analog 2"	2012	Odd Future, Tyler, the Creator, Frank Ocean	The OF Tape Vol. 2
"Drain"	2012	Pyramid Vritra	Pyramid
"Answer"	2013	Tyler, the Creator	Wolf
"Tamale"	2013	Tyler, the Creator	Wolf
"In the Morning"	2013	Mac Miller, Thundercat	Live from Space
"Therapy"	2014	Mac Miller	Faces
"The Daze"	2014	MellowHype	I Need Some Answers
"Gone"	2015	Snakehips	Forever, Pt. 2
"Pilot"	2015	Tyler, the Creator	Cherry Bomb
"Find Your Wings"	2015	Tyler, the Creator, Roy Ayers, Kali Uchis	Cherry Bomb
"Blow My Load"	2015	Tyler, the Creator, Wanya Morris, Dâm-Funk, Austin Feinstein	Cherry Bomb
"Hair Blows"	2015	Tyler, the Creator	Cherry Bomb
"Fucking Young / Perfect"	2015	Tyler, the Creator, Charlie Wilson, Chaz Bundick, Kali Uchis	Cherry Bomb
"A Good Feeling"	2015	Tay Walker	25 Hours a Day
"You're the One"	2016	Kaytranada	99.9%
"Vegetables"	2016	Jesse Boykins III, Willow Smith	Bartholomew
"Silkk da Shocka"	2016	Isaiah Rashad	The Sun's Tirade
"Red Wine"	2016	Common, Elena	Black America Again
"A Bigger Picture Called Free"	2016	Common, Bilal	Black America Again
"Shotgun"	2016	Little Simz	Stillness in Wonderland
"Dent Jusay"	2017	Matt Martians, Steve Lacy	The Drum Chord Theory
"Nothin"	2017	Kingdom	Tears in the Club
"Godess"	2017	Left Brain, Shann, Hodgy, Mike G	Mind Gone Volume 1
"Love"	2017	Dean	Non-album single
"Gorgeous"	2017	Vic Mensa	The Autobiography
"Take Me Away"	2017	Daniel Caesar	Freudian
"Sticky Situation"	2017	Quiñ	Dreamgirl
"The Long Way Home"	2017	The Jet Age of Tomorrow	God's Poop or Clouds?
"Simple Things"	2017	The Cool Kids, Quiñ	Special Edition Grandmaster Deluxe
"Show Love"	2018	Richard Russell, Sampha	Everything Is Recorded by Richard Russell
"Right Now"	2018	Dirty Projectors	Lamp Lit Prose
"Act Right"	2018	Tayla Parx	Tayla Made
"What's the Use?"	2018	Mac Miller, Dâm-Funk, Snoop Dogg, Thundercat	Swimming
"Do U Wrong"	2018	Leven Kali	Non-album single
"Getting Late"	2019	—N/a	Queen & Slim: The Soundtrack
"Doorman"	2019	SebastiAn	Thirst
"Urgency"	2020	Lil Uzi Vert	Eternal Atake
"When Love's Around"	2021	Zayn	Nobody Is Listening
"Take Care Of You"	2021	Charlotte Day Wilson	Alpha
"Baby"	2021	Brittany Howard, Gitty	Jaime (Reimagined)
"Get Me Started"	2022	Kehlani	Blue Water Road
"For Tonight"	2022	Larry June	Spaceships on the Blade
"007"	2022	Tabber	Non-album single

== Production discography ==
=== 2009 ===
Hodgy Beats – The Dena Tape

- 13. "Black Magic"

=== 2010 ===
Mike G – Ali

- 03. "Moracular World" (featuring Vince Staples) (produced with Left Brain)
- 04. "Stick Up" (featuring Earl Sweatshirt)
- 06. "Brown Bag ('04 FTA)"
- 08. "King"

Domo Genesis – Rolling Papers

- 05. "Dreams" (produced with Tyler, the Creator)

=== 2011 ===
Syd - Raunchboots

- 01. "The Clap"
- 02. "Teddy"
- 03. "Starfish"
- 04. "Spazzz"
- 05. "Peace & Quiet"
- 06. "Harry"
- 07. "Duhhbitch"
- 08. "As Time Goes By"
- 09. "Who Are You"
- 10. "The Quotia That Kills"

The Internet – Purple Naked Ladies

- 02. "They Say / Shangrila" (featuring Tay Walker) (produced with the Internet)
- 08. "Lovesong^{−1}"
- 10. "Web of Me"

=== 2012 ===
Kilo Kish - Homeschool

- 07. "You're Right"

The Internet – Purple Naked Ladies: 4 Bonus Songs

- 03. "Partners in Crime"

=== 2013 ===
Mike G - Verses

- 07. "Seasons Change" (featuring Speak)

The Internet - Feel Good

- 03. "Dontcha" (produced with Matt Martians, Midtown Pat, Mike Einziger, & Chad Hugo)
- 10. "Shadow Dance"
- 13. "Higher Times" (featuring Jesse Boykins III) (produced with Matt Martians, Midtown Pat, Christopher Allan Smith, & Tay Walker)

=== 2015 ===
Mike G - Verses II

- 04. "1pm"

The Internet - Ego Death

- 04. "Go With It" (featuring Vic Mensa (produced with Matt Martians, Christopher Allan Smith, & Cisco Adler)

=== 2017 ===
Syd – Fin

- 03. "No Complaints"
- 04. "Nothin to Somethin"
- 06. "Smile More"

=== 2019 ===
Mike G - Exile

- 09. "Exile (King Pt. II)"

Beyoncé – The Lion King: The Gift

- 21. "Otherside"

=== 2022 ===
Mike G - S.O.L.S

- 11. Lights On (Blue Version)

Syd - Broken Hearts Club

- 02. "Tie The Knot"
- 05. "Sweet"
- 08. "Getting Late"
- 09. "Out Loud" (featuring Kehlani) (produced with G Koop)
- 13. "Missing Out"

Beyoncé – Renaissance

- 08. "Plastic Off the Sofa"

== Tours ==
=== Headlining ===
- Beard Tour (2026)

=== Opening ===
- Billie Eilish - Hit Me Hard and Soft: The Tour (2025)
- Reneé Rapp - Bite Me Tour (Reneé Rapp) (2025)
