= The OF Tape Vol. 2 =

2012 studio album by Odd Future

Studio album by OF
- Released: March 20, 2012
- Recorded: 2010–12
- Genre: Alternative hip-hop
- Length: 63:23
- Labels: Odd Future; RED
- Producers: Tyler, the Creator; Left Brain; Frank Ocean; The Super 3

OF chronology
12 Odd Future Songs (2011)	The OF Tape Vol. 2 (2012)

Singles from The OF Tape Vol. 2
- 1. "Rella" Released: February 20, 2012; 2. "NY (Ned Flander)" Released: March 5, 2012

The OF Tape Vol. 2 (also known as The Odd Future Tape Vol. 2) is the only studio album by American hip hop collective Odd Future. It was released on March 20, 2012, by Odd Future Records and RED Distribution. A sequel to their debut mixtape, The Odd Future Tape (2008), the album features appearances from Odd Future members MellowHigh, Tyler, the Creator, Frank Ocean, Mike G, The Internet, Taco, Jasper Dolphin, and L-Boy, as well as an uncredited appearance from Earl Sweatshirt. Production was primarily handled by Left Brain and Tyler, the Creator, with Ocean, Pyramid Vritra and Matt Martians also receiving production credits. Lyrically, the album ranges from serious to satirical themes, with some tracks offering an overly absurdist take on rap.

Odd Future toured in support of the album, and four singles were released, all of which received music videos. The album peaked at number 5 on the US Billboard 200 and received mostly positive reviews from critics, including praise for Tyler and Ocean's presence, the vintage style of production and album closer, "Oldie".

== Background and recording ==
Los Angeles hip hop collective Odd Future, who were known for their frequent collaborations, have released mixtapes together in the past, such as Radical and the original Odd Future Tape. In January 2012, the group confirmed that they were to release their first commercially released album, titled The OF Tape Vol. 2. The album was to feature production and appearances by only Odd Future members, and would be promoted with a North American tour.

Some of the album was quickly recorded in Los Angeles over the course of two weeks. In an interview with The Guardian, when asked about the expectations of the album, Tyler replied "I don't know. I have my doubts. Everybody's going on it and I just think, fuck, everybody might hate this shit. Everybody might go: 'What the fuck is this? We wanted this, we wanted that.' There we go. We made an album we wanted to make. If everybody hates it, OK. We have an album we like." The track "Forest Green" was released over a year before the release of the album, but was featured on the project with remastered production.

== Content ==
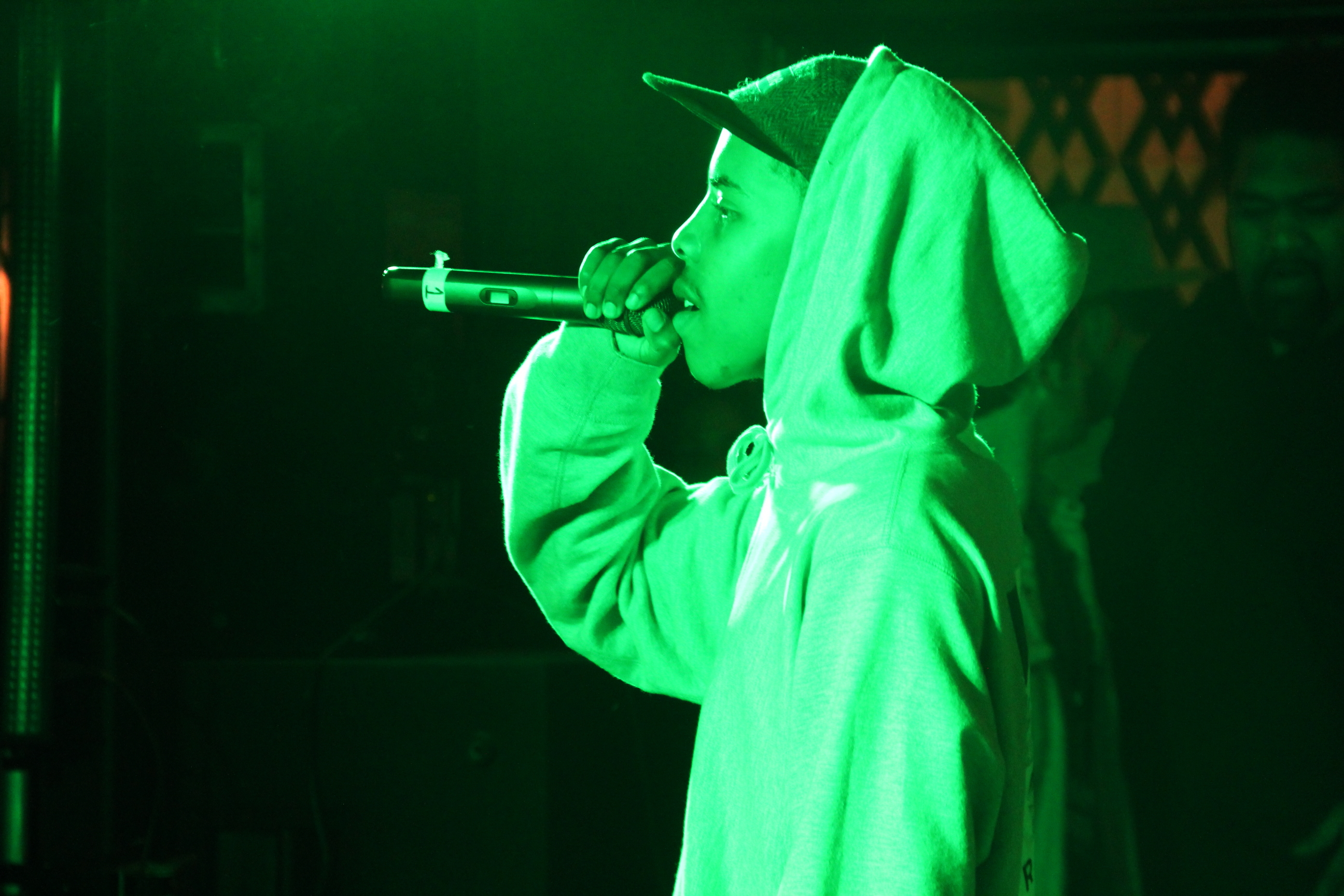
"Oldie" features Earl Sweatshirt's first appearance on a song since 2010.

The album opener "Hi", is a song where group member L-Boy insults each "dusty ass motherfucker" on the album, serving as a comical hip hop skit. "Bitches" is performed by Hodgy and Domo, with production by Left Brain. The track is a "boastful" scorcher, built from New Age synthesizers and hammering snare drums. The two rappers trade off-kilter verses at each other, with Hodgy delivering his verses with a melodic flow. Hodgy "turns up the aggression" on "NY (Ned Flander)", a track similar to the aesthetic of Tyler's album Goblin. Critics noted the song's "stark", "unnerving" and repetitive piano line that serves as the platform for Tyler and Hodgy's verses. Nathan Rabin wrote that all the songs up to "NY (Ned Flander)" are rap songs, but the one that follows, "Ya Know", is not, as it is more reminiscent of the band N.E.R.D. with its sonic shifts and "hazy" atmosphere. The track is performed by Matt Martians and Syd the Kyd of psych-soul act the Internet, with jazz influences.

Mike G is the only performer on "Forest Green", which reviewers described as a lurching banger with a creepy, hypnotic beat. "Lean" is a parody song in the style of Waka Flocka Flame, an absurdist take on rap music with lines like "If I was a dinosaur, I’d be a flexasaurus". Syd the Kyd makes another singing appearance on "Analog 2". The song features Ocean singing a chorus over a production of what writers thought of as atmospheric, with a sultry swirl of synths, and a segue with 12 seconds of silence. Tyler raps with relative innocence about hanging out with his girlfriend, and Syd the Kid muses about moonlight kisses and rooftop sexual encounters. Hodgy is the main contributor to "50", a bass-driven, comical song that takes cues from the comedy troupe The Lonely Island. "50" demonstrates both an aggressive and comical side to the album, with verses like "I'll fuck your grandmother up."

Hodgy reappears on "Snow White", featuring more singing from Ocean. Hodgy Beats raps at a very fast rate, centered on an intense beat. The 10th track is "Rella", where Tyler boasts about taking "three pills of Extenzo" to cure his erectile dysfunction, in a flow similar to rapper Eminem. The production was handled by Left Brain, with elements of electronic music, sounding like "something out of a Donkey Kong Country level." MellowHype and Taco contemplate the issues of not having an ideal woman on "Real Bitch". The track was written to be purposely offensive, with the two rappers trading verses on what reviewers described as an atmospheric, "slow-jam" beat. "P" features a bass-driven beat influenced by post-grunge, with Tyler rapping in the vein of the Wu-Tang Clan. The song features casual references to Jerry Sandusky and Casey Anthony, and Tyler's description of his flow being as "retarded as the sound of deaf people arguing."

"White" features Ocean alone, and is similar to a song from his album Channel Orange with the same name. The song is a vast departure from the rest of the album, featuring Ocean gently singing in the style of Stevie Wonder. Ocean speaks a contemplative poem about the transitory mystery of love, with the song serving as an intermission from the more aggressive style of the album. The song is followed by "Hcapd", with heavy synths played over Left Brain's verses about horror-related topics. Taco and Jasper Dolphin appear on the comical track "We Got Bitches", another absurdist parody composition. The song has a chaotic beat, taking influence from punk rock and rave music. Braggadocio rapping is prominent on the track, with the crew screaming the chorus "We got bitches, we got diamonds, we got cars, we got jacuzzis," adding "and yo’ bitch be on my dick!" The album closer is "Oldie", where Earl Sweatshirt makes his first rapping appearance in over a year. The song is a 10-minute track featuring, in order of appearance on the song, Taco, Tyler, Hodgy Beats, Left Brain, Mike G, Domo Genesis, Frank Ocean, Jasper Dolphin and Earl Sweatshirt, with Tyler closing the song with another verse. The song features the collective's blending of eccentricity and rebellion, and each rapper taking a verse to express their own topics of interest lyrically.

== Promotion ==
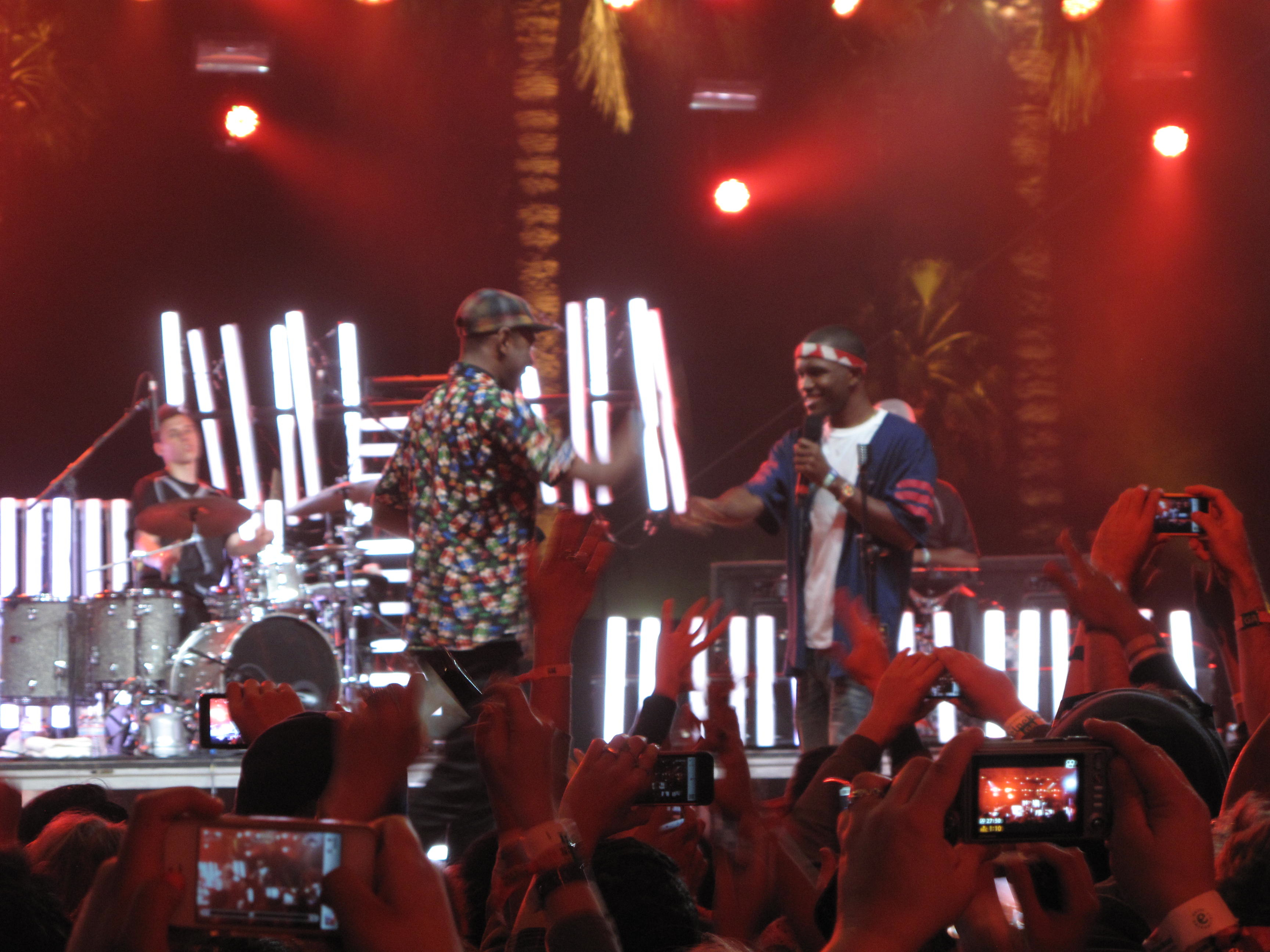
Frank Ocean performed "Analog 2" with Tyler, the Creator at Coachella.

On February 20, 2012, the music video for single "Rella" premiered online. The video was directed by Tyler, and according to Pitchfork Media's Jordan Sargent. The video can be summarized as "Hodgy Beats shoots lasers from his crotch turning girls into cats, while Domo Genesis smacks a black girl in the face, turning her into an Asian, and Tyler as a coke-snorting centaur."

The music video for "NY (Ned Flander)", also directed by Tyler, was premiered on March 5. The video contained scenes of Hodgy as a bald, deadbeat dad preoccupied with softcore porn, and Tyler's head on a baby's body.

The music video for "Oldie", directed by Lance Bangs, was released on March 20. The video was shot during a Terry Richardson photo shoot featuring the entire group. The collective decided to shoot an impromptu video where they rapped their verses. The rappers interrupt each other, while laughing and smiling.

"Sam (Is Dead)" was promoted as a short film, directed by Tyler. The short film is a war-themed comedic narrative, featuring Sweatshirt, Tyler, L-Boy, and even Lee Spielman of Odd Future Records's Trash Talk. Odd Future have performed several of the songs from the album on their tours. During Ocean's 2012 setlist at the Coachella Music Festival, Tyler joined Ocean on stage for a performance of "Analog 2".

Tyler also revealed one of the four covers on his Twitter.

== Critical reception ==
Professional ratings
Aggregate scores
Source	Rating
Metacritic	71/100
Review scores
Source	Rating
AllMusic	3.5/5 stars
The A.V. Club	A−
Beats Per Minute	78/100
Entertainment Weekly	B−
musicOMH	3.5/5 stars
Paste	8.4/10
Pitchfork	7.5/10
PopMatters	7/10
Rolling Stone	3.5/5 stars
Spin	6/10

The OF Tape Vol. 2 received mostly positive reviews from music critics. Pitchfork's Jordan Sargent stated that the album was mostly a success because "every member steps up", with Domo who had "evolved from the group's bumbling stoner into a guy who can spit dizzying, complicated verses". Jody Rosen of Rolling Stone stated that the album contained a "fizzy energy that elevates it above its limitations", musing that Odd Future were a lot like "early Wu-Tang, a thrilling regional act, and a bunch of whip-smart black hipsters whose worldview is grounded in their corner of sun-baked southern California." PopMatters's Jeff Dunn felt that every member improved from their past mixtapes, stating that Ocean, Tyler, and Sweatshirt were all impressive, consistently "spitting dizzying, more original lines than they ever have on mixtapes past." Dunn wrote that "after the mixed returns of Goblin, Tyler himself now seems to realize that less is more on his part", who "wisely tones down the shock-for-shock's-sake rhymes quite a bit, making his appearances all the more rewarding when they do occur." Steve Labate of Paste mused that "while Odd Future's critics try hard to frame them as such, it's difficult to accept Tyler and the OF crew as mere shock artists, flippantly tossing off incendiary slurs for attention—the music is too tongue-in-cheek clever, too brainy and self-aware, too anything-goes eccentric."

The A.V. Club's Chris Martins praised the album, stating that "perhaps most impressive is that Tyler, the Creator takes a noticeable step back so that his friends can enjoy the spotlight. When he does show up—standouts include the hulking G-funk mutation "Hcapd" and the grungy, bass-addled "P”—both his beats and raps thrill: All of the twisted jokes, tough introspection, and rabble-rousing that fans have come to expect, with none of the unfortunate rape references his detractors rightly called him on." AllMusic's David Jeffries called album closer "Oldie" epic in nature, stating that Earl Sweatshirt's return was the highlight of the album, summarizing the album as "hype warranted." Beats Per Minute's Craig Jenkins compared the album extensively to prior Odd Future releases, reporting that "it ditches the expansive ooze that made stretches of Tyler's Goblin a chore, the nihilistic agitprop of MellowHype's BlackenedWhite, and the lackadaisical drugginess of Mike G's Ali and Domo's Rolling Papers in favor of the kind of restless, jerky energy that skyrocketed Bastard into the dialogue months prior." He described the album as something that "mainly sounds like a bunch of dudes in a dank basement cooking up the wildest smack talk possible, with one-upping each other being the primary objective."

Jeff Reiss of Spin gave the album a mixed review, commenting that "it's Odd Future at their best, blending eccentricity, rebellion, and weird humor, with the fearlessness of kids convinced that there are no consequences to their actions", though noted that "at their worst, they are guilty of every adolescent's biggest fear - being boring." Ray Rhamen, writer for Entertainment Weekly gave a mixed review, reporting that "robbed of their outsider status, the boys swap horror for hormones on The OF Tape, Vol 2., giddily trading tall tales and witty obscenities. For better or worse, OF might actually be growing up." musicOMH's Andy Baber viewed the album as "an eclectic and solid - if unspectacular - return, which should see their already dedicated fanbase increase", commenting that "Frank Ocean is criminally underused". Mike Madden of Consequence of Sound felt that "too many things happen here, from the Brick Squad-type rave-ups to Ocean's R&B laments, for it to ever sound like a truly unified, full-length group project."

In 2019, Pitchfork placed album closer "Oldie" at number 160 on their list of "The 200 Best Songs of the 2010s."

== Commercial performance ==
In the United States, the album debuted at number 5 on the Billboard 200 with first-week sales of 40,000 copies. As of May 2012, the album has sold 71,000 copies in the United States. The album topped the US Billboard Top Rap Albums chart, the Top R&B/Hip-Hop Albums chart, and the Top Independent Albums chart. It also charted within the top 40 in Australia, Canada, Denmark and the UK. The song "Oldie" appeared at position 23 on the Bubbling Under R&B/Hip-Hop Singles chart.

== Track listing ==
No.	Title	Writer(s)	Producer(s)	Length
1.	"Hi." (performed by L-Boy)	Lionel Boyce	Tyler, the Creator	1:26
2.	"Bitches" (featuring MellowHigh)	Vyron Turner; Dominique Cole; Gerard Long	Left Brain	3:21
3.	"NY (Ned Flander)" (featuring Hodgy Beats and Tyler, the Creator)	Tyler Okonma; Long	Tyler, the Creator	2:39
4.	"Ya Know" (featuring the Internet)	Hal Williams; Matthew Martin; Sydney Bennett	The Super 3	4:01
5.	"Forest Green" (featuring Mike G)	Turner; Michael Griffin II	Left Brain	3:04
6.	"Lean" (featuring MellowHigh)	Turner; Long; Cole	Left Brain	2:35
7.	"Analog 2" (featuring Tyler, the Creator, Frank Ocean and Syd)	Okonma; Christopher Breaux; S. Bennett	Tyler, the Creator	4:36
8.	"50" (featuring MellowHype)	Turner; Long	Left Brain	3:19
9.	"Snow White" (featuring MellowHype and Frank Ocean)	Turner; Long; Breaux	Left Brain	2:27
10.	"Rella" (featuring MellowHigh and Tyler, the Creator)	Turner; Long; Cole; Okonma	Left Brain	3:11
11.	"Real Bitch" (featuring MellowHype and Taco)	Turner; Long; Travis Bennett	Left Brain	3:25
12.	"P" (featuring Hodgy Beats and Tyler, the Creator)	Okonma; Long	Tyler, the Creator	3:16
13.	"White" (featuring Frank Ocean)	Breaux; Okonma	Frank Ocean; Tyler, the Creator	2:03
14.	"Hcapd" (featuring MellowHigh and Tyler, the Creator)	Turner; Cole; Long; Okonma	Left Brain	3:41
15.	"Sam (Is Dead)" (featuring Domo Genesis and Tyler, the Creator)	Okonma; Cole	Tyler, the Creator	3:22
16.	"Doms" (featuring Domo Genesis)	Okonma; Cole	Tyler, the Creator	3:13
17.	"We Got Bitches" (featuring Tyler, the Creator, Taco and Jasper Dolphin)	Okonma; T. Bennett; Davon Wilson	Tyler, the Creator	3:19
18.	"Oldie"	Okonma; Long; Turner; Griffin; Cole; Breaux; Wilson; Thebe Kgositsile	Tyler, the Creator	10:36

Notes

- "We Got Bitches" features additional vocals by L-Boy
- "Analog 2" contains the hidden track, "Wheels 2"
- "50" and "Doms" feature additional vocals by Tyler, the Creator
- "Ya Know" features additional vocals by Pyramid Vritra

== Charts ==
=== Weekly charts ===
Chart (2012)	Peak position
Australian Albums Chart	34
Canadian Albums Chart	13
Danish Albums Chart	23
New Zealand Albums Chart	40
UK Albums Chart	40
UK R&B Albums Chart	3
US Billboard 200	5
US Independent Albums (Billboard)	1
US Top R&B/Hip-Hop Albums (Billboard)	1

=== Year-end charts ===
Chart (2012)	Peak position
US Independent Albums (Billboard)	41
US Top R&B/Hip-Hop Albums (Billboard)	56
