= Feel Good (The Internet album) =

Studio album by The Internet
- Released: September 24, 2013
- Genre: Electronica; neo-soul; alternative R&B
- Length: 66:00
- Label: Odd Future; Columbia; Sony
- Producer: Anthony Life; Mike Einziger (also exec.); Sydney Bennett; Matt Martians; Terence Brown; Stephen Bruner; Chad Hugo; Midtown Pat; Christopher Allan Smith; Tay Walker

The Internet chronology
Purple Naked Ladies (2011)	Feel Good (2013)	Ego Death (2015)

Singles from Feel Good
- 1. "Partners In Crime Part Two" Released: September 4, 2013; 2. "Dontcha" Released: September 11, 2013

Feel Good is the second studio album by hip hop soul band, The Internet. After releasing a few tracks early on SoundCloud, the album was released on iTunes on September 24, 2013, and released physically four days later.

== Reception ==
Professional ratings
Aggregate scores
Source	Rating
Metacritic	69/100
Review scores
Source	Rating
HipHopDX	4/5 stars
Now	4/5 stars
Pitchfork Media	6.4/10
PopMatters	7/10

Feel Good received generally positive reviews, much better than the reviews for their previous effort, Purple Naked Ladies. Bruce Smith of HipHopDX gave the album a 4/5 rating, stating it "is an upgrade from the group's debut album, Purple Naked Ladies across the board, resulting in an album that needs to be heard."

It also peaked at number 11 on the US Billboard Heatseekers Albums charts.

== Track listing ==
No.	Title	Writer(s)	Producer(s)	Length
1.	"Tellem (Intro)"	Sydney Bennett; Christopher Smith; Matthew Martin; Patrick Paige II; Tay Walker	Matt Martians; Midtown Pat; Smith; Walker	3:06
2.	"Sunset" (featuring Yuna)	Bennett; Walker; Paige II; Yuna Zarai	Midtown Pat	4:05
3.	"Dontcha"	Bennett; Martin; Paige II; Walker; Nicholas Eaholtz; Mike Einziger; Charles Hugo; David Rosser	Matt Martians; Syd Tha Kyd; Midtown Pat; Einziger; Chad Hugo	3:21
4.	"You Don't Even Know" (featuring Tay Walker)	Bennett; Walker; Trevon Trapper; Tradessa Willis	Matt Martians; Midtown Pat; Smith	4:57
5.	"Pupil | The Patience"	Bennett; Martin; Terence Brown	Matt Martians; Brown	8:14
6.	"Red Balloon"	Bennett; Martin; Stephen Bruner	Bruner	2:25
7.	"Cloud of Our Own"	Bennett; Martin; Paige II; Smith; Walker	Matt Martians; Midtown Pat; Smith; Walker	7:10
8.	"Runnin'" (featuring Tay Walker)	Bennett; Martin; Walker	Matt Martians	2:57
9.	"Matt's Apartment"	Martin; Einziger	Matt Martians	5:37
10.	"Shadow Dance"	Bennett; Alia Rose Brockert; Martin; Paige II; Smith; Walker	Syd Tha Kid	3:59
11.	"Wanders of the Mind" (featuring Mac Miller)	Malcolm McCormick; Martin; Paige II	Matt Martians	4:27
12.	"Partners in Crime, Part Two"	Bennet; Martin; Paige II; Smith; Walker	Midtown Pat; Smith; Walker	5:26
13.	"Higher Times" (featuring Jesse Boykins III)	Bennett; Martin; Patrick Paige II; Walker; Jesse Boykins III	Syd Tha Kyd; Matt Martians; Midtown Pat; Smith; Walker	10:16
Total length:				66:00
