= Speak (American rapper) =

American rapper (born 1987)

- Also known as: Speakz
- Born: Anthony David Negrete; February 24, 1987 (age 39); Los Angeles, California, U.S.
- Genres: Hip hop
- Occupations: Rapper; songwriter; producer
- Years active: 2007–present

Anthony David Negrete (born February 24, 1987), better known by his stage name Speak (also stylized as SPEAK, Speak!, or Speakz), is an American rapper and songwriter from Los Angeles, California. He is known for having co-written the 2011 song "Gucci Gucci" performed by Kreayshawn and collaborating with various Odd Future members such as Mike G and Syd tha Kyd, who recorded his 2011 album Inside Out Boy. He is based in Mexico City.
