= Ego Death (album) =

Studio album by the Internet
- Released: June 26, 2015
- Studio: 1500 or Nothin'; Banana Beat Studio; Chateau Marie; Trap 3.0
- Genre: R&B; neo soul
- Length: 56:29
- Label: Odd Future; Columbia
- Producer: Bambaata; Brian Kennedy; Christopher Smith; Cisco Adler; The Highlights; The Internet; Jameel Bruner; Kaytranada; Matt Martians; Nick Green; Patrick Paige; Steve Lacy; Syd; Tyler, the Creator

The Internet chronology
| Feel Good (2013) | Ego Death (2015) | Hive Mind (2018) |

Singles from Ego Death
- 1. "Special Affair" Released: June 2, 2015; 2. "Girl" Released: June 23, 2015

Ego Death is the third studio album by American R&B band the Internet. It was released on June 26, 2015, through Odd Future and distributed by Columbia Records. The album was supported by the singles "Special Affair" and "Girl". Ego Death was nominated at the 2016 Grammy Awards for Best Urban Contemporary Album.

== Promotion ==
The album's lead single, "Special Affair", was released on June 2, 2015. The album's second single, "Girl", was released on June 23, 2015. The song features a guest appearance from Haitian-Canadian DJ and record producer Kaytranada.

== Critical reception ==
Professional ratings
Aggregate scores
| Source | Rating |
|---|---|
| AnyDecentMusic? | 7.1/10 |
| Metacritic | 81/100 |
Review scores
| Source | Rating |
| AllMusic | 5/5 stars |
| Consequence | B |
| Exclaim! | 8/10 |
| The Guardian | 4/5 stars |
| HipHopDX | 4.0/5 |
| Pitchfork | 7.4/10 |
| PopMatters | 8/10 |
| RapReviews | 8/10 |
| Rolling Stone | 3.5/5 stars |
| Vice (Expert Witness) | A− |

Ego Death was met with widespread critical acclaim. At Metacritic, which assigns a normalized rating out of 100 to reviews from mainstream publications, the album received an average score of 81, based on 11 reviews. Aggregator AnyDecentMusic? gave it 7.1 out of 10, based on their assessment of the critical consensus.

Andy Kellman of AllMusic said, "The majority of Ego Death is tighter. Bennett has refined her songwriting without reducing the candid approach that colors her past compositions. Additionally, the tangents are fewer and more substantive". Pat Levy of Consequence said, "In addition to their more fully formed sound, one of the more exciting things about The Internet is the music's point of view". Michael J. Warren of Exclaim! said, "Ego Death frees the Internet from Odd Future connotations and R&B norms; it's their best work yet". Tshepo Mokoena of The Guardian said, "There's wit and honestly behind her observations of courting and heartbreak, making her pinhole focus on love more about nuance than navel-gazing. It's just as well the band stayed together". Ronald Grant of HipHopDX said, "Ego Death is an album both suited specifically for the social media age of music listeners but simultaneously rich and permeated with the traditions of the soul and R&B music of the past".

Jon Caramanica of The New York Times said, "There's convincing thump at work here, but not so much as to overwhelm the lustrous keyboards, the nuzzling bass, the way several of the songs unfurl like blooming roses". Sean Fennell of PopMatters said, "Ego Death and The Internet require a little bit of patience, but if you are willing to give it a full go, it will reward you with one of the most interesting albums in recent memory". Patrick Taylor of RapReviews said, "Ego Death is the perfect summer record. Breezy, smooth, lazy, and meant for warm nights". Craig Jenkins of Pitchfork said, "The Internet's songs have always felt like scenes of salaciousness happening just out of earshot. Ego Death finally pulls us into the maelstrom". Suzy Exposito of Rolling Stone said, "The best tracks fade away into gravity-defying instrumental outros that make Syd's heartache feel sublimely serene".

=== Industry awards ===
Awards and nominations for Ego Death
| Year | Ceremony | Category | Result | Ref. |
|---|---|---|---|---|
| 2016 | Grammy Awards | Best Urban Contemporary Album | Nominated | |

== Track listing ==
Ego Death track listing
| No. | Title | Writer(s) | Producer(s) | Length |
|---|---|---|---|---|
| 1. | "Get Away" | Sydney Bennett; Nick Green; Daniel "Bambaata" Marley | Steve Lacy; Matthew Martin | 2:28 |
| 2. | "Gabby" (featuring Janelle Monáe) | Martin; Bennett; Green; Janelle Robinson | Lacy; Martin | 3:32 |
| 3. | "Under Control" | Bennett; Green | The Internet | 4:04 |
| 4. | "Go with It" (featuring Vic Mensa) | Bennett; Green; Vic Mensa | Bennett; Martin; Christopher Allan Smith; Cisco Adler | 4:27 |
| 5. | "Just Sayin" / "I Tried" | "Just Sayin'": Bennett; Taylor Parks; "I Tried": Bennett | "Just Sayin'": Lacy; Smith; "I Tried": Bambaata; Smith | 6:54 |
| 6. | "For the World" (featuring James Fauntleroy) | James Fauntleroy; Bennett | Martin; Jameel Bruner; Patrick Paige; Smith | 3:23 |
| 7. | "Girl" (featuring Kaytranada) | Bennett; Green | Kaytranada; Bruner | 6:56 |
| 8. | "Special Affair" | Bennett; Parks | Lacy; Martin | 2:58 |
| 9. | "Somthing's Missing" | Bennett; Green; Martin | Martin; Lacy | 6:21 |
| 10. | "Partners in Crime Part Three" | Bennett | Brian Kennedy | 3:22 |
| 11. | "Penthouse Cloud" | Bennett | The Highlights; Lacy; Martin | 4:44 |
| 12. | "Palace" (featuring Tyler, the Creator) / "Curse" (featuring Steve Lacy) | "Palace": Tyler Okonma; Bennett; "Curse": Lacy; Bennett; Green | "Palace": Okonma; "Curse": Lacy | 7:20 |
| Total length: | | | | 56:29 |

Vinyl edition (bonus tracks)
| No. | Title | Writer(s) | Producer(s) | Length |
|---|---|---|---|---|
| 13. | "Famous" | Bennett; Green | Nicky Davey | 3:07 |
| 14. | "Missing You" | Bennett | Martin | 2:17 |
| Total length: | | | | 1:01:53 |

== Personnel ==
Credits adapted from the album's liner notes.

The Internet

- Syd – lead vocals, production (tracks 3, 4), keys (track 4), synths (track 4), background vocals (track 10), recording (tracks 1–12), executive production, mixing
- Matt Martians – production (tracks 1–4, 6, 8, 9, 11, 14), drums (tracks 1, 2, 8, 9, 11), synths (tracks 3, 4, 6), background vocals (track 2), recording (track 9), executive production, design
- Patrick Paige II – bass (tracks 3, 4, 6, 11, 13, 14), production (tracks 3, 6, 11), drums (track 11), guitar (track 11)
- Christopher Allan Smith – drums (tracks 3–6), production (tracks 3–6), percussion (track 13), recording (track 13), mixing
- Jameel Bruner – production (tracks 3, 6, 7), keys (tracks 3, 6, 13), additional synths (track 9), additional organ (track 9), background vocals (track 2)
- Steve Lacy – production (tracks 1–3, 5, 8, 9, 11, 12), bass (tracks 1, 2, 5, 8, 9, 11), guitar (tracks 1–3, 5, 8, 11), featured artist (track 12), executive production

Additional personnel

- Cisco Adler – production (track 4), guitar (track 4), recording (track 4)
- Brandon Combs – drums (track 13)
- Jimmy Douglass – mixing
- James Fauntleroy – featured artist (track 6)
- Durand Ferebee Jr. – background vocals (tracks 2, 4, 5, 7, 9, 12)
- Christopher Goldsmith for The Highlights – production (track 11), drums (track 11)
- Nick Green – background vocals (track 13), vocal production
- Kaytranada – featured artist (track 7), production (track 7)
- Brian Kennedy – production (track 10)
- Dave Kutch – mastering
- Janelle Monáe – featured artist (track 2), additional vocals (track 2)
- Daniel "Bambaata" Marley – production (track 5), guitar (track 5)
- Vic Mensa – featured artist (track 4)
- Xavier McHugh – recording (tracks 2, 4, 7, 9, 10, 12), percussion (track 13)
- Nicky Davey – production (track 13)
- Dave Rosser – guitar (track 13)
- Tay Walker – background vocals (track 2)
- Tyler, the Creator – featured artist (track 12), production (track 12)

== Charts ==
Chart performance for Ego Death
| Chart (2015–2016) | Peak position |
|---|---|
| New Zealand Heatseekers Albums (RMNZ) | 8 |
| US Billboard 200 | 89 |
| US Top R&B/Hip-Hop Albums (Billboard) | 9 |

== Certifications ==
Certifications for Ego Death
| Region | Certification | Certified units/sales |
|---|---|---|
| New Zealand (RMNZ) | Gold | 7,500^{‡} |
^{‡} Sales+streaming figures based on certification alone.

== Release history ==
Release dates and formats for Ego Death
| Region | Date | Label(s) | Format | Ref. |
|---|---|---|---|---|
| Worldwide | June 26, 2015 | Odd Future; Columbia | Digital download | |
| Worldwide | June 29, 2015 | Odd Future; Columbia | CD | |
| Worldwide | October 30, 2015 | Odd Future; Columbia | Vinyl | |
