= Odd Future Records =

American record label division owned by Sony Music Entertainment

- Parent company: Sony Music Entertainment
- Founded: 2011; 15 years ago
- Founder: Tyler, the Creator
- Defunct: 2016; 10 years ago
- Status: Defunct
- Distributors: RED; Columbia
- Genre: Various
- Country of origin: United States
- Location: Los Angeles, California
- Official website: oddfuture.com

Odd Future Records was an American record label founded by rapper and producer Tyler, the Creator of Odd Future in 2011. It operated as a division of Sony Music Entertainment.

== History ==
Odd Future Records was founded by Tyler, the Creator in 2011 as a means to release material from the Odd Future collective. Despite this, members Earl Sweatshirt (though the logo appears on formats of Earl's debut studio album Doris) and Frank Ocean did not sign. Hardcore punk band Trash Talk signed in 2012.

In 2016, the label went defunct following the group's disbandment.

== Former artists ==
Act	Years on the label	Releases under the label
Tyler, the Creator	2011–2016	2
Hodgy	2011–2016	3
Domo Genesis	2011–2016	2
Mike G	2011–2016	2
The Internet	2011–2016	3
Earl Sweatshirt	2011–2016	1
MellowHype	2011–2016	1
MellowHigh	2011–2016	1
The Jet Age of Tomorrow	2011–2016	1
Trash Talk	2012–2014	2

== Discography ==
=== Studio albums ===
Artist	Album	Details
The Internet	Purple Naked Ladies	Released: December 20, 2011; Chart position: —
Odd Future	The OF Tape Vol. 2	Released: March 20, 2012; Chart position: #5 U.S.; RIAA certification: —
Domo Genesis and The Alchemist	No Idols	Released: August 1, 2012; Chart position: —
MellowHype	Numbers	Released: October 9, 2012; Chart position: #54 U.S.; RIAA certification: —
Trash Talk	119	Released: October 9, 2012; Chart position: —
Tyler, the Creator	Wolf	Released: April 2, 2013; Chart position: #3 U.S.; RIAA certification: Platinum
The Jet Age of Tomorrow	JellyFish Mentality	Released: May 24, 2013; Chart position: —
Earl Sweatshirt	Doris	Released: August 20, 2013; Chart position: #5 U.S.; RIAA certification: Gold
The Internet	Feel Good	Released: September 24, 2013; Chart position: —
MellowHigh	MellowHigh	Released: October 31, 2013; Chart position: #89 U.S.; RIAA certification: —
Trash Talk	No Peace	Released: May 27, 2014; Chart position: —
Tyler, the Creator	Cherry Bomb	Released: April 13, 2015; Chart position: #4 U.S.; RIAA certification: Gold
The Internet	Ego Death	Released: June 26, 2015; Chart position: #89 U.S.; RIAA certification: —
Domo Genesis	Genesis	Released: March 25, 2016; Chart position: #110 U.S.; RIAA certification: —
Hodgy	Fireplace: TheNotTheOtherSide	Released: December 9, 2016; Chart position: #196 U.S.; RIAA certification: —

=== Compilation albums ===
Artist	Album	Details
Odd Future	12 Odd Future Songs	Released: October 3, 2011; Chart position: —

=== Extended plays ===
Artist	Album	Details
Mike G	The Award Tour EP	Released: November 28, 2011; Chart position: —
Hodgy	Untitled	Released: February 24, 2012; Chart position: —
Hodgy	Untitled 2	Released: June 1, 2013; Chart position: —
Mike G	Award Tour II	Released: January 26, 2015; Chart position: —
