= The Internet (band) =

American R&B and soul band

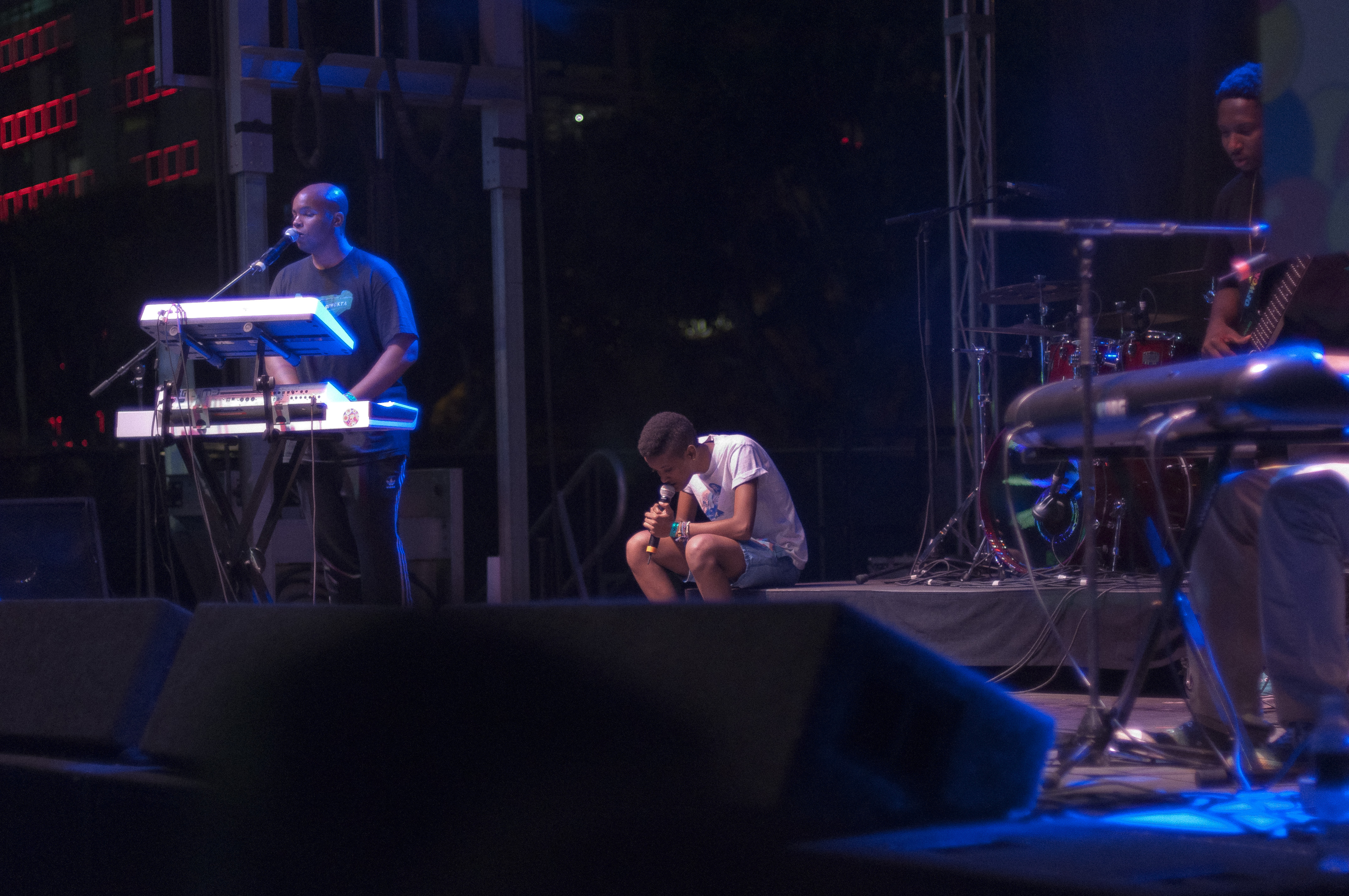
- The Internet performing in 2012

Background information
- Origin: Los Angeles, California, U.S.
- Genres: Soul; alternative R&B
- Years active: 2011–2022, 2025–present
- Labels: Odd Future; Sony; Columbia
- Spinoff of: Odd Future
- Members: Syd; Matt Martians; Steve Lacy; Patrick Paige II; Christopher Smith
- Past members: Tay Walker; Jameel Bruner
- Website: internet-band.com

The Internet is an American alternative R&B and soul band from Los Angeles, California. It consists of vocalist Syd, keyboardist Matt Martians, bassist Patrick Paige II, drummer Christopher Smith, and guitarist Steve Lacy.

Their music is a blend of R&B, hip-hop, jazz, funk, and electronic dance music. They have released four studio albums and three extended plays since their formation in late 2011. The band's 2015 album Ego Death was nominated for the Grammy Award for Best Urban Contemporary Album.

== History ==
The Internet was formed in early 2011 by Odd Future members Syd and Matt Martians, along with touring members Patrick Paige, Christopher Smith, and Tay Walker. The band's name originally started out as a joke, inspired by Left Brain's answer to a reporter asking where he was from, to which he responded, "I hate when people ask me that, I'm going to start saying I'm from the Internet". The idea amused Syd, and inspired the name for her side project that eventually became The Internet.

Their debut album Purple Naked Ladies was released on December 20, 2011. It was the first physical album to be released through Odd Future Records. Two songs from the album, "Cocaine" and "Fastlane", had music videos to accompany their release. The Internet has a song included on the Odd Future album The OF Tape Vol. 2, called "Ya know".

The band released their second album Feel Good in September 2013, and received praise from fans and critics. The first single from the album, "Give It Time", was released through Odd Future's official SoundCloud. On June 10, 2013, The band backed Mac Miller in London in promotion of his second album Watching Movies with the Sound Off.

Their third album Ego Death was released by Odd Future & Columbia on June 30, 2015, to widespread acclaim. Matt Martians on NPR said about the album's title: "A lot of people that we know [are] just having their egos checked in many ways. Some people losing their jobs when, last year, they were at the top of the mountain; certain people's careers going in different directions that they didn't anticipate. And just kind of two words that you want people to think about these days, because we do have a lot of people who, on the Internet — whether it's Instagram, Twitter — it's a lot of egos that are really based on nothing backing it up."

Following the release of Ego Death, the band's members each focused on releasing individual solo projects. 2017 saw the release of Matt Martians' The Drum Chord Theory, Syd's Fin, Steve Lacy's Demo, Patrick Paige II's Letters of Irrelevance and Christopher A. Smith's Loud, as a part of the duo C&T.

In December 2017, Steve Lacy told DJ Matt Wilkinson of Beats 1 that the follow-up to Ego Death was "95%" finished. He added: "I feel like this is on a higher echelon than Ego Death. I love Ego Death, that was a great record, but I know this one is a step up."

In April 2018, Patrick Paige II announced his debut album Letters of Irrelevance. Later that month, the band released the single "Roll (Burbank Funk)", in promotion of their fourth studio album, Hive Mind. The track features joint lead vocals by Steve Lacy and Syd. The next month the band announced their fourth album, Hive Mind, which released on July 20, 2018. In October 2018, The Internet was the opening act at all but one show for Gorillaz on their North American leg of The Now Now Tour, which concluded with the Demon Dayz Festival. Their performance at the Scotiabank Arena on October 8, 2018, was their first ever performance in a stadium venue.

In September 2025, TMZ reported that the band is ending its hiatus and is working on a new album as schedules allow.

== Members ==
Contributions refer to members' live roles. On studio recordings, each member plays a variety of instruments.

- Sydney Bennett – vocals (2011–present)
- Matthew Martin – keyboards, vocals (2011–present)
- Christopher Smith – drums (2013–present)
- Steve Lacy – guitar, vocals (2015–present)

=== Past members ===
- Tay Walker – keyboards (2011–2013)
- Jameel Bruner – keyboards (2013–2016)
- Patrick Paige II – bass guitar (2013–2022)

Timeline

== Discography ==
=== Studio albums ===
List of studio albums, with year released
Title	Album details	Peak chart positions									
Title	Album details	US	US R&B/HH	US R&B	US Heat	AUS	BEL (FL)	NLD	SWI	UK	UK R&B
Purple Naked Ladies	Released: December 19, 2011; Label: Odd Future, Sony; Formats: CD, digital download	—	—	—	31	—	—	—	—	—	—
Feel Good	Released: September 24, 2013; Label: Odd Future, Sony; Formats: CD, digital download	—	—	—	11	—	—	—	—	—	—
Ego Death	Released: June 26, 2015; Label: Odd Future, Columbia; Formats: CD, digital download, vinyl	89	9	3	—	45	—	—	—	—	—
Hive Mind	Release date: July 20, 2018; Label: Columbia; Formats: CD, digital download, vinyl	26	14	2	—	40	45	53	89	39	3
"—" denotes items which were not released in that country or failed to chart.

=== EPs ===
List of extended plays, with year released
Title	Album details
Purple Naked Ladies: 4 Bonus Songs	Released: February 1, 2012; Label: Odd Future; Formats: Digital download
Black and Blue Point Two; (with Raleigh Ritchie)	Released: April 14, 2014; Label: Columbia; Formats: Digital download
Ego Death (Bonus Tracks)	Released: November 13, 2015; Label: Odd Future; Formats: Digital download

=== Singles ===
Title	Year	Peak chart positions				Certifications	Album
Title	Year	US Adult R&B	US Rhy.	US R&B/HH Airplay	BEL (FL) Tip	Certifications	Album
"Love Song - 1"	2011	—	—	—	—		Purple Naked Ladies
"They Say"	2011	—	—	—	—		Purple Naked Ladies
"Cocaine"	2011	—	—	—	—		Purple Naked Ladies
"Fastlane"	2012	—	—	—	—		Purple Naked Ladies
"Partners In Crime Part Two"	2013	—	—	—	—		Feel Good
"Dontcha"	2013	—	—	—	—		Feel Good
"Special Affair"	2015	—	—	—	—	RIAA: Gold	Ego Death
"Under Control"	2015	19	—	—	—		Ego Death
"Girl" (featuring Kaytranada)	2015	19	28	44	89	BPI: Silver; RIAA: Platinum	Ego Death
"Roll (Burbank Funk)"	2018	—	—	—	—		Hive Mind
"Come Over"	2018	—	—	—	—		Hive Mind
"La Di Da"	2018	—	—	—	—		Hive Mind
"—" denotes a recording that did not chart or was not released in that territory.

=== Other appearances ===
Title	Year	Lead artist	Album	Credit(s)
"They Say"	2011	Odd Future	12 Odd Future Songs	
"Ya Know"	2012	Odd Future	The OF Tape Vol. 2	Featured artist
"Navy"	2012	Kilo Kish	Homeschool	Production
"Blue Jeans (Odd Future's The Internet Mix)"	2012	Lana Del Rey	Blue Jeans Remixes	Remix
"You're the One (Odd Future's The Internet featuring Mike G Remix)"	2012	Charli XCX	Heartbreaks and Earthquakes	Remix
"Fitzpleasure (The Internet of Odd Future Remix)"	2012	Alt-J	Summer	Remix
"Watergun"	2012	Kilo Kish	non-album single	Production
"Pull Me Down (The Internet Remix)"	2013	Mikky Ekko	Time	Remix
"Objects In The Mirror"	2013	Mac Miller	Watching Movies with the Sound Off	Featured artist
"Karma (Internet Edition)"	2015	Tay Walker	25HAD	

== Awards and nominations ==
=== Soul Train Awards ===
Year	Nominee/Work	Award	Result
2015	Themselves	Centric Certified	Nominated
2018	"Come Over"	Song of the Year	Nominated
2018	Hive Mind	Album/Mixtape of the Year	Nominated
2018	"Come Over"	Video of the Year	Nominated

=== Grammy Awards ===
Year	Nominee/Work	Award	Result
2016	Ego Death	Best Urban Contemporary Album	Nominated
