= Chromakopia: The World Tour =

2025 concert tour by Tyler, the Creator

- Tour by Tyler, the Creator
- Location: Europe; North America; Oceania; Asia; South America
- Associated album: Chromakopia; Don't Tap the Glass
- Start date: February 4, 2025
- End date: March 31, 2026
- Legs: 5
- No. of shows: 106
- Supporting acts: Lil Yachty; Paris Texas
- Website: chromakopiatour.com

Tyler, the Creator concert chronology
- Call Me If You Get Lost Tour (2022); Chromakopia: The World Tour (2025-2026)

Chromakopia: The World Tour was the seventh headlining concert tour by American rapper and producer Tyler, the Creator in support of his eighth and ninth studio albums, Chromakopia (2024) and Don't Tap the Glass (2025). It began on February 4, 2025, at Xcel Energy Center in Saint Paul, Minnesota and ended on March 31, 2026, at the José Miguel Agrelot Coliseum in San Juan, Puerto Rico. Lil Yachty and Paris Texas serve as supporting acts for the tour.

== Background and development ==
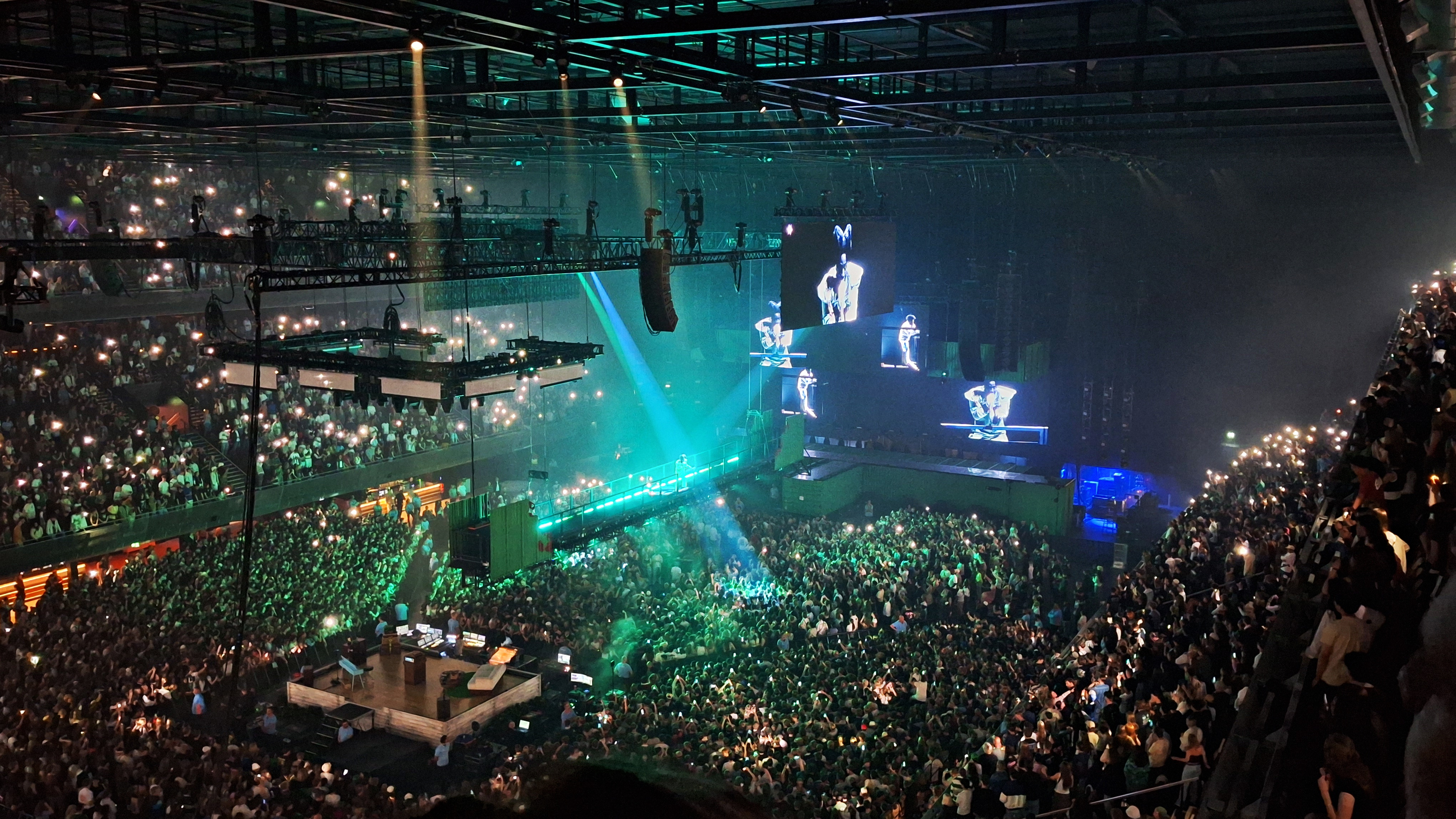
Tyler, the Creator, performing in Amsterdam

On October 23, 2024, five days before the launch of his eighth studio album Chromakopia, a 64-date tour was announced by Tyler on his official social media platforms, with shows in various different cities across North America, Europe and Oceania, along Lil Yachty and Paris Texas featured as opening acts.

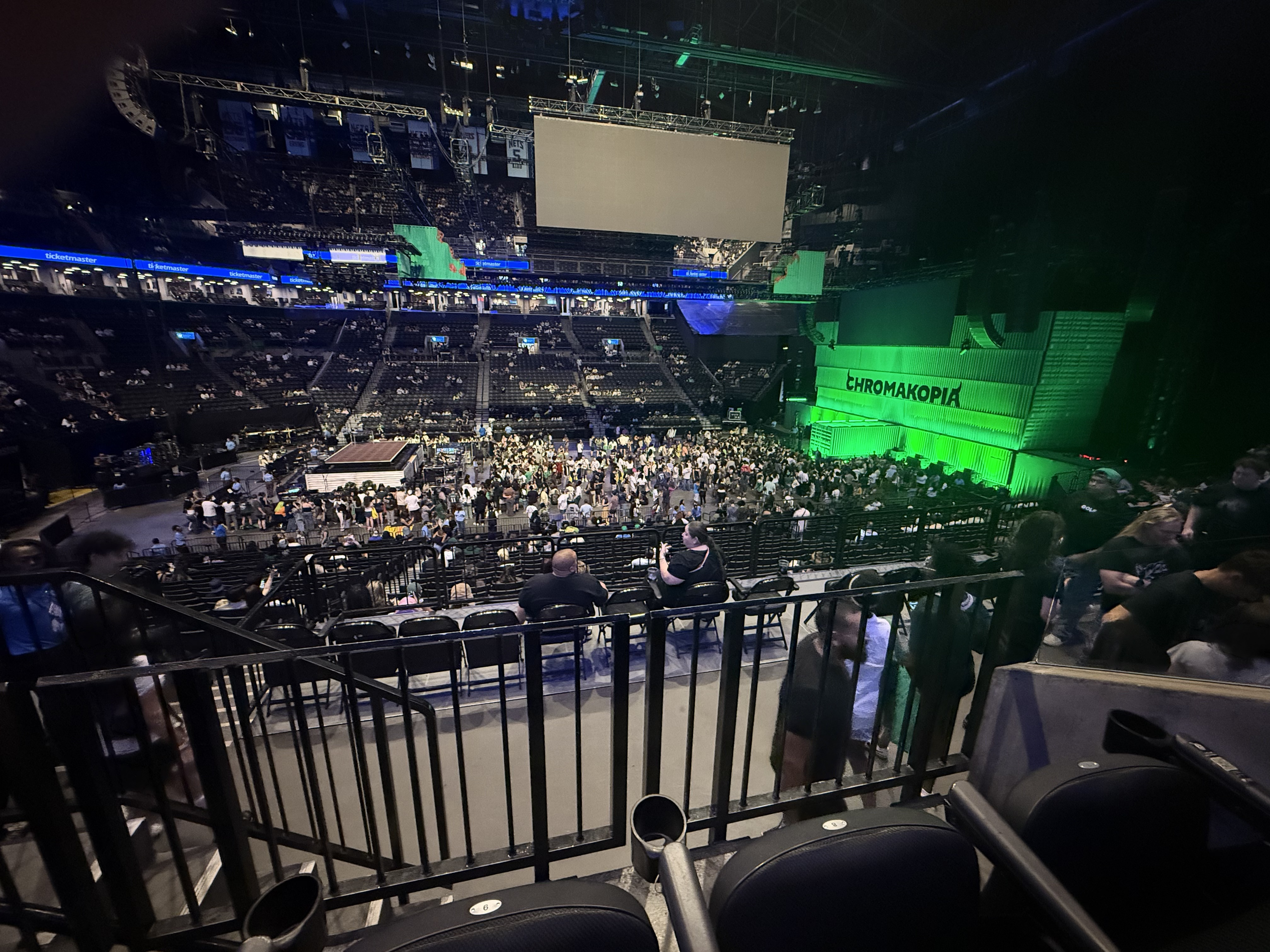
July 18th NYC Chromakopia Concert

Seventeen new shows were added on October 30, with additional dates for Los Angeles, San Diego, Chicago, Boston, New York City and Paris. The next day, extra shows for Amsterdam, London, Manchester, Glasgow and Newark were announced.

Before embarking on the tour, Tyler performed Chromakopia at small shows, such as a surprise Halloween gig in Boston on Lovejoy Wharf, and with the largest thus far at his Camp Flog Gnaw Carnival in Los Angeles on November 16, 2024. Second and fourth dates were added in Perth and Melbourne, respectively, on November 19. On February 26, 2025, shows in Asia were announced. A second date was added in Quezon City on March 12.

While on tour for Chromakopia, Tyler released his ninth studio album Don't Tap The Glass on July 21, 2025. The night before the album release, he held a listening party at the Hollywood Forever Cemetery in Los Angeles which nearly 300 people were in attendance.

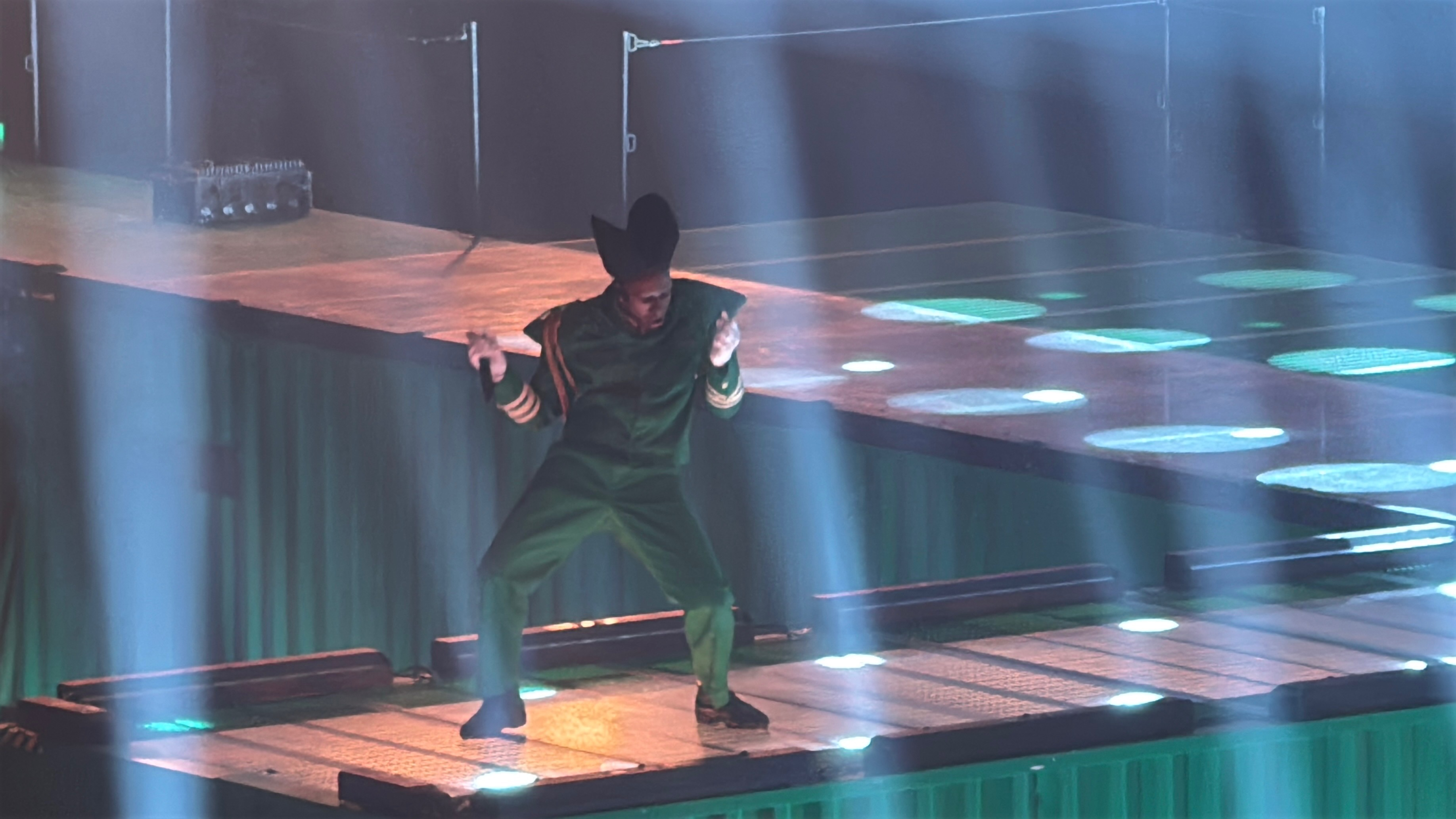
Chromakopia Concert Performance NYC

== Set list ==
The following set list is obtained from the February 15, 2025 show in Los Angeles. It is not intended to represent all dates throughout the tour.

1. "St. Chroma"
2. "Rah Tah Tah"
3. "Noid"
4. "Darling, I"
5. "Hey Jane"
6. "I Killed You"
7. "Judge Judy"
8. "Sticky"
9. "Take Your Mask Off"
10. "Tomorrow"
11. "Igor's Theme"
12. "Earfquake"
13. "Thank You"
14. "I Think"
15. "Yonkers"
16. "Tron Cat"
17. "She"
18. "Tamale"
19. "Rusty"
20. "IFHY"
21. "Lumberjack"
22. "I Thought You Wanted to Dance"
23. "Dogtooth"
24. "Sorry Not Sorry"
25. "Deathcamp"
26. "2Seater"
27. "Smuckers"
28. "Where This Flower Blooms"
29. "Boredom"
30. "Who Dat Boy"
31. "WusYaName"
32. "Thought I Was Dead"
33. "That Guy"
34. "Like Him"
35. "See You Again"
36. "New Magic Wand"
37. "Balloon"
38. "I Hope You Find Your Way Home"

== Tour dates ==
List of 2025 concerts, showing date, city, country, venue, opening acts, attendance and gross revenue
Date (2025)	City	Country	Venue	Opening act	Attendance	Revenue
February 4	Saint Paul	United States	Xcel Energy Center	Lil Yachty; Paris Texas	14,383 / 14,383	$2,265,441
February 6	Milwaukee	United States	Fiserv Forum	Lil Yachty; Paris Texas	12,379 / 12,379	$1,805,230
February 8	Kansas City	United States	T-Mobile Center	Lil Yachty; Paris Texas	13,865 / 13,865	$1,936,542
February 11	Denver	United States	Ball Arena	Lil Yachty; Paris Texas	13,526 / 13,526	$2,123,903
February 14	Los Angeles	United States	Crypto.com Arena	Lil Yachty; Paris Texas	77,683 / 77,683	$12,133,669
February 15	Los Angeles	United States	Crypto.com Arena	Lil Yachty; Paris Texas	77,683 / 77,683	$12,133,669
February 17	Los Angeles	United States	Crypto.com Arena	Lil Yachty; Paris Texas	77,683 / 77,683	$12,133,669
February 18	Los Angeles	United States	Crypto.com Arena	Lil Yachty; Paris Texas	77,683 / 77,683	$12,133,669
February 20	Los Angeles	United States	Crypto.com Arena	Lil Yachty; Paris Texas	77,683 / 77,683	$12,133,669
February 21	Los Angeles	United States	Crypto.com Arena	Lil Yachty; Paris Texas	77,683 / 77,683	$12,133,669
February 23	Sacramento	United States	Golden 1 Center	Lil Yachty; Paris Texas	13,889 / 13,889	$2,356,445
February 24	Oakland	United States	Oakland Arena	Lil Yachty; Paris Texas	14,136 / 14,136	$2,587,856
February 26	Portland	United States	Moda Center	Lil Yachty; Paris Texas	13,554 / 13,554	$1,955,284
February 28	Vancouver	Canada	Rogers Arena	Lil Yachty; Paris Texas	14,298 / 14,298	$1,841,962
March 2	Seattle	United States	Climate Pledge Arena	Lil Yachty; Paris Texas	28,039 / 28,039	$4,927,293
March 3	Seattle	United States	Climate Pledge Arena	Lil Yachty; Paris Texas	28,039 / 28,039	$4,927,293
March 5	San Francisco	United States	Chase Center	Lil Yachty; Paris Texas	13,574 / 13,574	$2,219,186
March 7	Paradise (Note: Labelled as Las Vegas in promotional material.)	United States	MGM Grand Garden Arena	Lil Yachty; Paris Texas	12,321 / 12,321	$1,892,559
March 9	San Diego	United States	Pechanga Arena	Lil Yachty; Paris Texas	21,355 / 21,355	$3,818,615
March 10	San Diego	United States	Pechanga Arena	Lil Yachty; Paris Texas	21,355 / 21,355	$3,818,615
March 12	Phoenix	United States	PHX Arena	Lil Yachty; Paris Texas	13,477 / 13,477	$2,247,657
March 15	Austin	United States	Moody Center	Lil Yachty; Paris Texas	24,334 / 24,334	$4,174,465
March 16	Austin	United States	Moody Center	Lil Yachty; Paris Texas	24,334 / 24,334	$4,174,465
March 17	Dallas	United States	American Airlines Center	Lil Yachty; Paris Texas	14,050 / 14,050	$2,377,604
March 19	Houston	United States	Toyota Center	Lil Yachty; Paris Texas	12,738 / 12,738	$1,991,583
March 21	Atlanta	United States	State Farm Arena	Lil Yachty; Paris Texas	12,876 / 12,876	$2,120,052
March 22	Orlando	United States	Kia Center	Lil Yachty; Paris Texas	13,467 / 13,467	$2,042,950
March 24	Miami	United States	Kaseya Center	Lil Yachty; Paris Texas	14,355 / 14,355	$2,185,887
March 26	Charlotte	United States	Spectrum Center	Lil Yachty; Paris Texas	14,673 / 14,673	$2,251,126
March 28	Pittsburgh	United States	PPG Paints Arena	Lil Yachty; Paris Texas	12,878 / 12,878	$1,848,825
March 29	Columbus	United States	Value City Arena	Lil Yachty; Paris Texas	13,252 / 13,252	$2,151,852
April 1	Washington, D.C.	United States	Capital One Arena	Lil Yachty; Paris Texas	14,978 / 14,978	$2,396,527
April 25	Antwerp	Belgium	Sportpaleis	Lil Yachty; Paris Texas	17,319 / 17,319	$1,449,205
April 27	Paris	France	Accor Arena	Lil Yachty; Paris Texas	31,629 / 31,629	$2,985,833
April 28	Paris	France	Accor Arena	Lil Yachty; Paris Texas	31,629 / 31,629	$2,985,833
April 30	Assago (Note: Labelled as Milan in promotional material.)	Italy	Unipol Forum	Lil Yachty; Paris Texas	11,909 / 11,909	$1,145,510
May 1	Zurich	Switzerland	Hallenstadion	Lil Yachty; Paris Texas	14,613 / 14,613	$2,119,262
May 2	Frankfurt	Germany	Festhalle	Lil Yachty; Paris Texas	12,309 / 12,309	$1,082,457
May 4	Cologne	Germany	Lanxess Arena	Lil Yachty; Paris Texas	16,405 / 16,405	$1,614,747
May 6	Oslo	Norway	Spektrum	Lil Yachty; Paris Texas	10,450 / 10,450	$1,151,252
May 7	Copenhagen	Denmark	Royal Arena	Lil Yachty; Paris Texas	14,490 / 14,490	$1,395,485
May 9	Prague	Czech Republic	O2 Arena	Lil Yachty; Paris Texas	13,728 / 13,728	$1,258,947
May 10	Kraków	Poland	Tauron Arena	Lil Yachty; Paris Texas	13,993 / 13,993	$1,359,544
May 12	Berlin	Germany	Uber Arena	Lil Yachty; Paris Texas	14,562 / 14,562	$1,279,228
May 14	Amsterdam	Netherlands	Ziggo Dome	Lil Yachty; Paris Texas	30,931 / 30,931	$2,686,684
May 15	Amsterdam	Netherlands	Ziggo Dome	Lil Yachty; Paris Texas	30,931 / 30,931	$2,686,684
May 17	Birmingham	England	Utilita Arena	Lil Yachty; Paris Texas	13,785 / 13,785	$1,457,492
May 19	London	England	The O2 Arena	Lil Yachty; Paris Texas	48,709 / 48,709	$6,203,265
May 21	London	England	The O2 Arena	Lil Yachty; Paris Texas	48,709 / 48,709	$6,203,265
May 22	London	England	The O2 Arena	Lil Yachty; Paris Texas	48,709 / 48,709	$6,203,265
May 24	Dublin	Ireland	3Arena	Lil Yachty; Paris Texas	27,735 / 27,735	$2,779,349
May 25	Dublin	Ireland	3Arena	Lil Yachty; Paris Texas	27,735 / 27,735	$2,779,349
May 27	Manchester	England	Co-op Live	Lil Yachty; Paris Texas	33,184 / 33,184	$3,762,734
May 28	Manchester	England	Co-op Live	Lil Yachty; Paris Texas	33,184 / 33,184	$3,762,734
May 30	Glasgow	Scotland	OVO Hydro	Lil Yachty; Paris Texas	24,212 / 24,212	$2,856,739
May 31	Glasgow	Scotland	OVO Hydro	Lil Yachty; Paris Texas	24,212 / 24,212	$2,856,739
June 6 (Note: This concert is part of Governors Ball Music Festival.)	Queens	United States	Flushing Meadows-Corona Park	—		
June 27	Cincinnati	United States	Heritage Bank Center	Lil Yachty; Paris Texas	13,512 / 13,512	$1,757,113
June 28	Cleveland	United States	Rocket Arena	Lil Yachty; Paris Texas	15,181 / 15,181	$1,864,368
June 30	Chicago	United States	United Center	Lil Yachty; Paris Texas	29,124 / 29,124	$4,343,385
July 1	Chicago	United States	United Center	Lil Yachty; Paris Texas	29,124 / 29,124	$4,343,385
July 3	Detroit	United States	Little Caesars Arena	Lil Yachty; Paris Texas	14,361 / 14,361	$2,101,953
July 5	Philadelphia	United States	Wells Fargo Center	Lil Yachty; Paris Texas	29,070 / 29,070	$4,118,207
July 6	Philadelphia	United States	Wells Fargo Center	Lil Yachty; Paris Texas	29,070 / 29,070	$4,118,207
July 8	Boston	United States	TD Garden	Lil Yachty; Paris Texas	26,413 / 26,413	$3,949,745
July 9	Boston	United States	TD Garden	Lil Yachty; Paris Texas	26,413 / 26,413	$3,949,745
July 11	Baltimore	United States	CFG Bank Arena	Lil Yachty; Paris Texas	11,485 / 11,485	$1,596,430
July 12	Raleigh	United States	Lenovo Center	Lil Yachty; Paris Texas	14,013 / 14,013	$2,017,297
July 14	New York City	United States	Madison Square Garden	Lil Yachty; Paris Texas	27,339 / 27,339	$4,941,005
July 15	New York City	United States	Madison Square Garden	Lil Yachty; Paris Texas	27,339 / 27,339	$4,941,005
July 17	New York City	United States	Barclays Center	Lil Yachty; Paris Texas	25,700 / 25,700	$4,839,622
July 18	New York City	United States	Barclays Center	Lil Yachty; Paris Texas	25,700 / 25,700	$4,839,622
July 22	Montreal	Canada	Bell Centre	Lil Yachty; Paris Texas	15,654 / 15,654	$1,528,959
July 24	Toronto	Canada	Scotiabank Arena	Lil Yachty; Paris Texas	29,547 / 29,547	$3,434,086
July 25	Toronto	Canada	Scotiabank Arena	Lil Yachty; Paris Texas	29,547 / 29,547	$3,434,086
July 27	Newark	United States	Prudential Center	Lil Yachty; Paris Texas	27,394 / 27,394	$4,275,989
July 28	Newark	United States	Prudential Center	Lil Yachty; Paris Texas	27,394 / 27,394	$4,275,989
August 1 (Note: Part of Hinterland Music Festival.)	St. Charles	United States	Avenue of the Saints Amphitheater	—N/a		
August 2 (Note: Part of Osheaga Festival.)	Montreal	Canada	Parc Jean-Drapeau	—N/a		
August 10 (Note: Part of Outside Lands Festival.)	San Francisco	United States	Golden Gate Park	—N/a		
August 18	Auckland	New Zealand	Spark Arena	Lil Yachty; Paris Texas	12,408 / 12,408	$1,409,115
August 20	Melbourne	Australia	Rod Laver Arena	Lil Yachty; Paris Texas	54,222 / 54,222	$6,939,610
August 22	Melbourne	Australia	Rod Laver Arena	Lil Yachty; Paris Texas	54,222 / 54,222	$6,939,610
August 23	Melbourne	Australia	Rod Laver Arena	Lil Yachty; Paris Texas	54,222 / 54,222	$6,939,610
August 24	Melbourne	Australia	Rod Laver Arena	Lil Yachty; Paris Texas	54,222 / 54,222	$6,939,610
August 26	Sydney	Australia	Qudos Bank Arena	Lil Yachty; Paris Texas	51,074 / 51,074	$6,613,438
August 27	Sydney	Australia	Qudos Bank Arena	Lil Yachty; Paris Texas	51,074 / 51,074	$6,613,438
August 28	Sydney	Australia	Qudos Bank Arena	Lil Yachty; Paris Texas	51,074 / 51,074	$6,613,438
August 30	Brisbane	Australia	Brisbane Entertainment Centre	Lil Yachty; Paris Texas	25,928 / 25,928	$3,569,473
August 31	Brisbane	Australia	Brisbane Entertainment Centre	Lil Yachty; Paris Texas	25,928 / 25,928	$3,569,473
September 4	Perth	Australia	RAC Arena	Lil Yachty; Paris Texas	27,520 / 27,520	$3,420,561
September 5	Perth	Australia	RAC Arena	Lil Yachty; Paris Texas	27,520 / 27,520	$3,420,561
September 9	Tokyo	Japan	Ariake Arena	Paris Texas	—	—
September 10	Tokyo	Japan	Ariake Arena	Paris Texas	—	—
September 13	Goyang (Note: Labelled as Seoul in promotional material.)	South Korea	KINTEX Hall 10	Paris Texas	—	—
September 14	Goyang	South Korea	KINTEX Hall 10	Paris Texas	—	—
September 16	Pak Kret (Note: Labelled as Bangkok in promotional material.)	Thailand	Impact Arena	Paris Texas	12,806 / 12,806	$1,513,756
September 20	Quezon City (Note: Labelled as Manila in promotional material.)	Philippines	Araneta Coliseum	Paris Texas	—	—
September 21	Quezon City	Philippines	Araneta Coliseum	Paris Texas	—	—
November 22 (Note: Part of Camp Flog Gnaw Carnival.)	Los Angeles	United States	Elysian Park	—	—	—

List of 2026 concerts, showing date, city, country, venue, opening acts, attendance and gross revenue
Date (2026)	City	Country	Venue	Opening act	Attendance	Revenue
March 13 (Note: Part of Lollapalooza Chile.)	Santiago	Chile	Parque O'Higgins	—		
March 14 (Note: Part of Lollapalooza Argentina.)	Buenos Aires	Argentina	Hipodromo de San Isidro	—		
March 18	Alajuela (Note: Labelled as San José in promotional material.)	Costa Rica	Parque Viva	—	—	—
March 20 (Note: Part of Festival Estéreo Picnic.)	Bogotá	Colombia	Simón Bolívar Park	—		
March 22 (Note: Part of Lollapalooza Brazil.)	São Paulo	Brazil	Interlagos Circuit	—		
March 24	Mexico City	Mexico	Palacio de los Deportes	—	—	—
March 25	Mexico City	Mexico	Palacio de los Deportes	—	—	—
March 27 (Note: Part of Pa'l Norte.)	Monterrey	Mexico	Fundidora Park	—		
March 29	Guadalajara	Mexico	Arena Guadalajara	—	—	—
March 31	San Juan	Puerto Rico	José Miguel Agrelot Coliseum	—	—	—

=== Cancelled shows ===
List of cancelled concerts
Date	City	Country	Venue	Reason	Ref.
6 April 2025 (Note: This concert was supposed to be part of Axe Ceremonia.)	Mexico City	Mexico	Parque Bicentenario	The second day of the festival was suspended by Mexico City authorities after two photographers died when a metal structure collapsed.	
13 June 2025 (Note: This concert was supposed to be part of Bonnaroo.)	Manchester	United States	Great Stage Park	The last three days of the festival were cancelled due to severe weather.	
