= Tara Razavi =

American creative producer

- Education: University of California, Los Angeles
- Occupation: Creative producer
- Years active: 2010 - present

Tara Razavi is an American creative producer and the founder of the creative production company Happy Place. She works across music videos, commercial campaigns, film, television, and live experiential projects.

== Early life and education ==
Razavi was born in the United States to Iranian parents who immigrated to the country shortly before the Iranian Revolution. She grew up in Los Angeles. She attended the University of California, Los Angeles (UCLA), where she initially planned to study law. After interning in the A&R department at Babyface’s record label, she chose to pursue a career in the music industry instead.

== Career ==
Razavi began working in music video production after being invited to work on the music video for Nas's song "Hero", directed by TAJ. Following that project, she continued collaborating with the director on multiple projects. She worked as a music manager at BET, where she contributed to the pilot of College Hill, and later worked with networks including Oxygen, VH1, and MTV.

In 2010, Razavi founded the production company Happy Place. Through the company, she has produced music videos, branded content, and events for artists and brands.

Razavi has collaborated frequently with rapper and producer Tyler, the Creator. Her music video credits include work with Jennifer Lopez on "On the Floor," as well as projects with Frank Ocean ("Pyramids"), and Usher ("Dive In").

In 2019, Razavi spoke at the South by Southwest (SXSW) festival in Austin, where she discussed music video innovation and the growing role of technology in visual storytelling.

In 2024, Razavi was attached as a producer on Strobe, a feature thriller directed by Taylor Cohen. The film features a cast including Laura Harrier and Suzanna Son, and follows a high school senior's obsessive search for a mysterious EDM artist.

== Filmography ==
=== Film ===
Year	Title	Role	Ref
2024	American Dream: The 21 Savage Story	Producer	
2024	Champions of the Golden Valley	Executive producer	

=== Television ===
Year	Title	Role	Notes
2010	Obsessed	Production coordinator	TV series
2021	The LCD Soundsystem Holiday Special	Producer	TV special
2022	Call Me If You Get Lost Live	Executive producer	TV special

=== Music videos (selected) ===
Year	Artist	Title	Role
2011	Tyler, the Creator	"She"	Executive producer
2012	Frank Ocean	"Pyramids"	Producer
2012	Hodgy Beats, Domo Genesis & Tyler, the Creator	"Rella"	Producer
2012	Tyler, the Creator & Hodgy Beats	"NY (Ned Flander)"	Producer
2013	Tyler, the Creator	"Tamale"	Producer
2013	Tyler, the Creator	"IFHY"	Producer
2013	Tyler, the Creator	"Domo 23"	Producer
2015	Justin Bieber	"What Do You Mean?"	Executive producer
2015	G-Eazy & Bebe Rexha	"Me, Myself & I"	Producer
2017	Vince Staples	"Prima Donna"	Producer
2018	A$AP Rocky feat. Skepta	"Praise the Lord (Da Shine)"	Producer
2019	Taylor Swift	"Lover"	Executive producer
2019	Taylor Swift	"You Need to Calm Down"	Producer
2019	Tyler, the Creator	"Earfquake"	Executive producer
2021	Billie Eilish & Rosalía	"Lo Vas a Olvidar"	Producer
2022	A$AP Rocky	"D.M.B."	Producer
2023	Tyler, the Creator	"Sorry Not Sorry"	Producer
2024	Tyler, the Creator	"Noid"	Producer
2025	Tyler, the Creator	"Darling, I"	Producer
