= Neighborhood (Teezo Touchdown song) =

2023 song by Teezo Touchdown

Song by Teezo Touchdown

from the album How Do You Sleep at Night?
- Released: 8 September 2023
- Genre: Alternative rock; contemporary R&B
- Length: 3:27
- Label: RCA; Not Fit for Society
- Songwriters: Aaron Thomas; Ju. Raisen; Je. Raisen
- Producers: Ju. Raisen; SadPony

Teezo Touchdown chronology
"Impossible" (2023)	"Neighborhood" (2023)	"Mood Swings" (2023)

"Neighborhood" is a song by American singer Teezo Touchdown. It was released on September 8, 2023, as the sixth song from Teezo's debut studio album, How Do You Sleep at Night?.

== Background and reception ==
Cooper Sullivan of Old Gold & Black wrote that the song has "A grooving slap bassline that could be ripped straight from a Graham Central Station recording session in the 70s". Josh Feldstein of The Daily Orange thought that Teezo Touchdown wanted "to tell a story about the trials and tribulations of everyday life". Timothy McShea of The Johns Hopkins News-Letter wrote that the song focuses on the topic of "close proximity to other people in 'the hood'." McShea also opined that the song has "a real feel-good beat, almost like an intro to Teezo's family sitcom."

Lyrically, Teezo adopts the voice of several characters in the titular neighborhood, who all interact with one another. The song culminates in one of the characters being shot.
