= You Thought (song) =

2023 song by Teezo Touchdown featuring Janelle Monáe

Song by Teezo Touchdown featuring Janelle Monáe

from the album How Do You Sleep at Night?
- Released: 31 August 2023
- Genre: Alternative rock; contemporary R&B
- Length: 3:01
- Label: RCA; Not Fit for Society
- Songwriters: Aaron Thomas; Sarah Aarons; Tyler Cole
- Producer: Tyler Cole

Teezo Touchdown chronology
"Modern Jam" (2023)	"You Thought" (2023)	"OK" (2023)

"You Thought" is a song by American singer Teezo Touchdown featuring compatriot Janelle Monáe. It was released on August 31, 2023, as the second single and second song from Teezo's debut studio album, How Do You Sleep at Night?.

== Background ==
Janelle Monáe heard an early version of How Do You Sleep at Night? in 2022. On August 30, 2023, Teezo announced the release of the song via his Instagram story, displaying a sticky note which read: "Comment "Action" under my next post to get the first song of the album co-starring Janelle Monáe". The song was released the following day.

== Composition ==
The song opens with an "alternative guitar beat and building percussion, with Teezo spitting his signature flow over the punk-rock instrumentals." After one minute, the song becomes softer, and Teezo duets Monáe. Writing for NME, Kyann-Sian Williams wrote that the song, featuring "the equally thought-provoking music disruptor Janelle Monáe", "is a perfect example" of Teezo's "amalgamated" song structure". He identified the instrumentation as having a "punchy bassline", "thrashing drums and shredded guitar riffs". Describing the song's composition, KCRW's Andrea Domanick wrote that the "Texas rapper-singer hits the ground running, his flow nonchalantly keeping pace with a drum major beat over reggae strums that give way to metal riffs. But just when you think he’s tough as the nails in his ‘do, Teezo relents into a confessional croon that grasps at a fraught relationship. Add Janelle Monáe into the mix for call-and-response vocals that bring the track to a halting conclusion, with no resolution." Lyrically, the song addresses how others perceive Teezo, and later revolves around a broken relationship.

== Reception ==
"You Thought" received critical acclaim. Elaina Bernstein of Hypebeast wrote that "the emerging rapper continues to flex his unique way of intertwining hip-hop and trap with edgy pop-punk influences; on his newest single "You Thought", Teezo does what he does best – and enlists Monáe to contribute her genre-bending finesse as well." She also opined that "the duo’s harmonies evoke a magical energy that rings so differently from the hard-hitting first minute of the cut." Kyann-Sian Williams of NME called Teezo's vocals and instrumentation "a total delight", also praising Monáe's register. The chemistry between Teezo and Monáe was widely praised.
