= Impossible (Teezo Touchdown song) =

2023 song by Teezo Touchdown

Song by Teezo Touchdown

from the album How Do You Sleep at Night?
- Released: 8 September 2023
- Genre: Alternative rock; contemporary R&B
- Length: 2:46
- Label: RCA; Not Fit for Society
- Songwriters: Aaron Thomas; Ju. Raisen; Je. Raisen
- Producers: Ju. Raisen; SadPony

Teezo Touchdown chronology
"Sweet" (2023)	"Impossible" (2023)	"Neighborhood" (2023)

"Impossible" is a song by American singer Teezo Touchdown. It was released on September 8, 2023, as the fifth song from Teezo's debut studio album, How Do You Sleep at Night?.

== Background ==
The song's lyrics detail why people should follow their dreams.

On 11 October 2023, Teezo Touchdown released a music video for the song, designed to appear as one continuous shot. HotNewHipHop's Lavender Alexandria wrote that "The video is of Teezo himself in some of his trademark spikes with lights and hands altering the scenery around him."

== Reception ==
James Mellen of Clash praised the song's "gentle indie rock flair". Lavender Alexandria of HotNewHipHop recognised the song as "one of the breakout hits from the album".
