= Paul Ngozi =

Zambian musician (1949–1989)

- Born: Paul Dobson Nyirongo; January 10, 1949; Lusaka, Zambia
- Died: 7 November 1989 (aged 40) Lusaka, Zambia
- Genres: Zamrock; kalindula; garage rock; proto-punk
- Occupation: Singer
- Instruments: Voice, Electric Guitar,
- Years active: 1972 – 1989
- Label: Now-Again (reissues)

Paul Ngozi (born Paul Dobson Nyirongo; January 10, 1949 – November 7, 1989) was a Zambian musician who was prominent in the Zambian music scene in the 1970s and 1980s. He first became popular as the band leader of the Ngozi Family, a top local rock group which was one of the first groups to have its music classified as Zamrock.

He earned his place as a ‘sharp’ social commentator because the themes of his music were usually very close to society's own lives and therefore easy to relate to. He is listed at number 81 of the most popular Zambians by The Zambian online newspaper. He died in 1989.

== Studio albums ==
- Day Of Judgment (1976)
- Viva Ngozi (1976)
- 45,000 Volts (1977)
- 99% Confusion (1977)
- Bad Character (1977)
- Heavy = Metal (1977)
- In The Ghetto (1977)
- Lightning And Thunder (1977)
- Happy Trip (1978)
- Heavy Connection (1978)
- The Best of Paul Ngozi (1979)
- Size 9 (1981)
- Thokozile (1983)
- Chitwansombo (1982)

=== Selected singles ===
- "Bauze"
- "Give Me A Hand"
- "Half Mwenye-Half Muntu"
- "I've been looking for you"/"We were not told"
- "Kanyamata"
- "Kunali kamwana"
- "Kunisebanya"
- "Mulandu Wa Damage"
- "Musizani Yomunde"
- "Nshaupwa bwino"
- "Nyagondwe"
- "Size Nine"
- "Sooka iyo"
- "Sunka mulamu"
- "Timwenge tabenetabene"
- "Tikondane"
- "Ulemu"
- "Vikwati Vapa Telephone"
- "Vina bwela mo chedwa"
- "Yowowa"
- "Rhoda"

== Legacy ==
The song "Hold On" is featured in Season One Episode Five of the Series Poker Face.

Tyler, the Creator sampled Ngozi's song "Nizakupanga Ngozi" on his 2024 song "Noid" as part of the album “Chromakopia”.

He has a street named after him in Kabwata, a constituency in Lusaka.

== See also ==
- Music of Zambia
- Zamrock
