= How Do You Sleep at Night? =

Studio album by Teezo Touchdown
- Released: September 8, 2023
- Genres: R&B; rock; experimental hip hop
- Length: 39:37
- Labels: RCA; Not Fit for Society
- Producers: Andrew Bolooki; Bnyx; Brendan Grieve; Dylan Brady; Dylan Neustadter; Hoskins; Jose Julian de la Cruz; Justin Raisen; Roofeeo; Khris Riddick-Tynes; Tizhimself; SadPony; Solomonophonic; Tyler Cole; Y2K

Teezo Touchdown chronology
Cover Boy (2018)	How Do You Sleep at Night? (2023)

Singles from How Do You Sleep at Night?
- 1. "Familiarity" Released: April 3, 2023; 2. "You Thought" Released: August 31, 2023

How Do You Sleep At Night? is the debut studio album by American rapper Teezo Touchdown. It was released through RCA Records and Not Fit for Society on September 8, 2023. The album features guest appearances from Janelle Monáe, Fousheé, and Isaiah Rusk. Production was handled by brothers Justin Raisen and SadPony, Tyler Cole, Khris Riddick-Tynes, Bnyx, Brendan Grieve, Hoskins, Bolooki, Tizhimself, Roofeeo, Jose Julian de la Cruz, Solomonophonic, Dylan Neudstadter, Y2K, and Dylan Brady.

How Do You Sleep At Night? is an experimental hip hop album. It was supported by the singles "Familiarity" and "You Thought" featuring Janelle Monáe. The album's deluxe edition, How Do You Sleep at Night? With You, was released on January 10, 2024.

== Background and promotion ==
In an interview with Zane Lowe of Apple Music, Teezo Touchdown shared his thoughts about the album and described its genres:

This is, as far as the sonics of what you're going to hear, I haven't said this publicly yet, but it's the sound that I'm crafting that's called rock & boom. It's R&B with the intensity of rock. It has R&B top lines. The boom, of course, for boom bap, it's the boom bap penmanship.

Before the release of the album, Teezo Touchdown frequently promoted it and gave hints about it through Instagram posts and stories, and Canadian rapper and singer Drake also co-signed the album ahead of its release as he saw it as "some of the best music ever".

== Critical reception ==
Professional ratings
Aggregate scores
Source	Rating
Metacritic	56/100
Review scores
Source	Rating
Clash	8/10
HipHopDX	2.7/5
NME	4/5 stars
Pitchfork	5.3/10
Rolling Stone	4/10
Slant Magazine	1.5/5 stars

How Do You Sleep at Night? received polarised reviews from critics. It received a score of 56 out of 100 on review aggregator Metacritic based on seven critics' reviews, indicating "mixed or average" reception. Writing for NME, Kyann-Sian Williams felt that "this love for dramatic highs and muted lows on this album makes the record a rollercoaster of emotions and sounds, and a polished and entertaining debut".

Critics widely noted the genre-bending nature of the album, but had divided opinions on its execution: in a positive review, James Mellen of Clash described How Do You Sleep at Night? as "a brilliantly dizzying melting pot of genre and sonic identity", whereas Pitchfork's Alphonse Pierre criticized the album as "a genre mash-up that isn't as offbeat as it wants to be". Several critics gave negative evaluation of Teezo's songwriting, which was described as "lack[ing] specificity" by Slant's Paul Attard and as "juvenile at best" by HipHopDX's Louis Pavlakos. However, Teezo's singing performances were praised even in some otherwise critical reviews: for instance, Jeff Ihaza of Rolling Stone described Teezo as a "genuinely gifted singer" with "an effective R&B register", and Pitchfork's review found that Teezo's voice "slides nicely into the R&B lane". The guest appearances by Fousheé and Janelle Monáe were positively received: both singers were described as delivering strong vocal performances that juxtaposed interestingly with Teezo's.

=== Year-end lists ===
Select year-end rankings for How Do You Sleep at Night?
Publication	List	Rank	Ref.
XXL	The Best Hip-Hop Projects of 2023	–	
Billboard	The 50 Best Albums of 2023	29	
Uproxx	The Best Albums of 2023	–	

Select year-end rankings for How Do You Sleep at Night? With You
Publication	List	Rank	Ref.
HuffPost	The Best Albums of 2024	–	

== Track listing ==
How Do You Sleep at Night? track listing
No.	Title	Writer(s)	Producer(s)	Length
1.	"OK"	Aaron Thomas; Justin Raisen; Jeremiah Raisen	Ju. Raisen; SadPony	1:57
2.	"You Thought" (featuring Janelle Monáe)	Aa. Thomas; Sarah Aarons; Tyler Cole	Cole	3:01
3.	"Uuhh"	Aa. Thomas; Khristopher Riddick-Tynes	Khris Riddick-Tynes	3:29
4.	"Sweet" (featuring Fousheé)	Aa. Thomas	Bnyx	2:12
5.	"Impossible"	Aa. Thomas; Ju. Raisen; Je. Raisen	Ju. Raisen; SadPony	2:46
6.	"Neighborhood"	Aa. Thomas; Ju. Raisen; Je. Raisen	Ju. Raisen; SadPony	3:27
7.	"Mood Swings"	Aa. Thomas; Brendan Grieve; Jonathan Hoskins	Grieve; Hoskins	2:53
8.	"Too Easy" (featuring Isaiah Rusk)	Aa. Thomas; Isaiah Rusk; Cole	Cole	2:52
9.	"Familiarity"	Aa. Thomas; Andrew Bolooki; Jahphet Landis; Gerard Powell II	Bolooki; Tizhimself; Roofeeo	3:27
10.	"I Don't Think U C Me" (featuring Isaiah Rusk)	Aa. Thomas; Rusk; Cole; Jose Julian de la Cruz	Cole; de la Cruz	1:43
11.	"Daddy Mama Drama"	Aa. Thomas; Grieve; Hoskins	Grieve; Hoskins	3:52
12.	"Nu Nay"	Aa. Thomas; Jared Solomon	Solomonophonic	1:46
13.	"Stranger"	Aa. Thomas; Dylan Neustadter	Neustadter	3:37
14.	"The Original Was Better"	Aa. Thomas; Ari Starace; Dylan Brady	Y2K; Brady	2:27
Total length:				39:37

How Do You Sleep at Night? With You deluxe edition bonus disc
No.	Title	Writer(s)	Producer(s)	Length
1.	"Up and Down"	Aa. Thomas; Dylan Wiggins; Hoskins	Wiggins; Hoskins	3:04
2.	"Out of Respect"	Aa. Thomas; Aniko Thomas; Edward O'Sullivan Lee; Johan Lenox; Leroy Smart; Rex Kudo; Zach Nahome	Niko the Great; Nahome; Lenox	2:35
3.	"Third Coast"	Aa. Thomas; Demonte Morton	D-Lo the Doctor	2:36
Total length:				47:52

Notes

- "Uuhh" is stylized in all caps.

== Personnel ==
- Teezo Touchdown – vocals, vocal production
- Dale Becker – mastering
- Scott Desmarais – mixing
- Andrew Keller – engineering, vocal production (all tracks); drums (tracks 8)
- Katie Harvey – engineering assistance
- Nate Mingo – engineering assistance
- Brandon Hernandez – engineering assistance (2, 9)
