= Hey Jane =

American healthcare business

- Industry: Consumer healthcare, Virtual care, Telehealth
- Founded: 2021; 5 years ago U.S.
- Founder: Gaby Izarra; Kiki Freedman; Dr. Kate Shaw
- Headquarters: New York, New York, U.S.
- Area served: Arizona; California; Colorado; Connecticut; Delaware; District of Columbia; Hawaii; Illinois; Maine; Maryland; Massachusetts; Michigan; Minnesota; Nevada; New Hampshire; New Jersey; New Mexico; New York; Ohio; Oregon; Rhode Island; Vermont; Virginia; Washington
- Services: Medication abortion; Birth control; Emergency contraception
- Website: heyjane.com

Hey Jane is a United States-based virtual clinic that provides medication abortion and other reproductive and sexual health services through telehealth. Founded in 2021 by Kiki Freedman, Gaby Izarra, and Dr. Kate Shaw, the company launched during the COVID-19 pandemic and was among the first digital health providers to mail abortion pills following changes to U.S. Food and Drug Administration (FDA) telemedicine prescribing rules.

As of 2026, Hey Jane operates in 23 states and the District of Columbia, offering abortion care, birth control, emergency contraception, and treatment for common vaginal and urinary tract infections. The company has been covered in The New York Times, USA Today, and Vogue, and has been cited in reproductive health research as an example of how telehealth can expand abortion access.

== History ==
Hey Jane was founded in 2021 in New York by Kiki Freedman, Gaby Izarra, and Dr. Kate Shaw. The company launched during the COVID-19 pandemic, when abortion clinics in some states were deemed "non-essential" and the U.S. Food and Drug Administration temporarily allowed mifepristone, one of the two abortion medications, to be prescribed via telehealth and mailed to patients. The FDA later made this change permanent in 2021. Hey Jane raised a $2.2 million dollar seed round in 2021 in the wake of this change.

Freedman has cited her experiences living in Missouri—where only one abortion clinic was at times available—as a key motivator for starting the company. In interviews, she described Hey Jane as a way to maintain safe and discreet access to abortion care at a time of clinic closures and growing restrictions.

"When I was attending college in Missouri before Roe v. Wade was overturned, I saw what it meant for a state to be down to a single abortion clinic, and how quickly access to essential care could disappear," Freedman wrote. "It felt dystopian that in the U.S., millions of people could be left without safe, legal abortion. That experience inspired me to build Hey Jane — a way to make reproductive health care accessible, discreet, and compassionate through telemedicine." –Kiki Freedman, Hey Jane CEO & Co-Founder

The company initially launched in New York and Washington state before expanding to California, Colorado, Illinois, and New Mexico.

In 2022, following the Supreme Court's decision in Dobbs v. Jackson Women's Health Organization, which overturned Roe v. Wade, Hey Jane raised $6.1 million to expand its services. On the day of the decision, the company reported tenfold increases in web traffic and doubled demand. The same year, Hey Jane announced it had expanded to New Jersey and Connecticut.

In 2023, Hey Jane expanded beyond abortion to include birth control, emergency contraception, and treatment for urinary tract infections, bacterial vaginosis, yeast infections, and herpes. This expansion beyond abortion care positions Hey Jane as a full-spectrum virtual clinic for sexual and reproductive health, with an emphasis on privacy, affordability, and patient-centered care.

That same year, the company began accepting coverage from private health insurers including Aetna, Anthem Blue Cross Blue Shield of Connecticut, Empire Blue Cross Blue Shield of New York, and Sana Benefits—the first fully virtual abortion clinic to accept private insurance. Coverage later expanded to plans such as Blue Shield of California, Cigna, and Oscar.

In addition to insurance expansion, Hey Jane expanded to an additional eleven states in 2023, including Delaware, Hawaiʻi, Maine, Maryland, Massachusetts, Minnesota, New Hampshire, Rhode Island, Vermont, and Virginia—plus Washington D.C.

In 2024, Hey Jane expanded to Nevada. In December 2024, Hey Jane announced it had begun accepting Illinois Medicaid for abortion care, reducing the cost of treatment to $0 for eligible patients.

In 2025, Hey Jane expanded into Michigan and Ohio, two large Midwestern states with relatively few clinics and high demand due to restrictions in nearby states. This brought Hey Jane to 22 states and Washington D.C.

In 2026, Hey Jane expanded to Arizona. This came after a state Superior Court judge ruled that the prior telehealth ban was unconstitutional in February 2026. As of September 2026, they have served over 140,000 patients.

== Services ==
Hey Jane's primary service is medication abortion via telehealth. Patients complete an online intake form, are evaluated by a licensed provider, and, if eligible, receive FDA-approved medications (mifepristone and misoprostol) shipped in discreet packaging. Patients have access to secure messaging with providers and a 24/7 nursing phone line for urgent issues. In addition to abortion pills, the company also prescribes:

- Birth control – prescriptions for oral contraceptive pills, plus patches, vaginal rings, shots, and non-hormonal methods.
- Emergency contraception – time-sensitive medications to prevent pregnancy after contraceptive failure or unprotected sex, including a generic version of Plan B (Levonorgestrel) and a prescription option called Ella (Ulipristal acetate).
- Urinary tract infection (UTI) treatment – antibiotic treatment for UTIs, with quick turnaround to minimize discomfort.
- Bacterial vaginosis (BV) treatment – prescription treatment for bacterial overgrowth and vaginal imbalance, including Tinidazole, Metronidazole, Secnidazole, and Clindamycin.
- Yeast infection treatment – antifungal treatments—like Fluconazole and Butoconazole—for this common vaginal infection.
- Herpes (HSV) treatment and prevention – antiviral medication to treat and manage both oral and genital herpes outbreaks. Medications offered include Acyclovir, Famciclovir, and Valacyclovir, plus lidocaine cream to help with pain.

== Operations ==
As of June 2026, Hey Jane operates in 23 states and the District of Columbia, including Arizona, California, Colorado, Connecticut, Delaware, District of Columbia, Hawaii, Illinois, Maine, Maryland, Massachusetts, Michigan, Minnesota, Nevada, New Hampshire, New Jersey, New Mexico, New York, Ohio, Oregon, Rhode Island, Vermont, Virginia, Washington. Residency is not required, and patients can travel to one of these states to get abortion care through Hey Jane.

Hey Jane is certified by the National Abortion Federation and by LegitScript, a verification system for online pharmacies and telehealth clinics.

== Accessibility and Cost ==
Hey Jane provides several options to make treatment more affordable. Patients may use qualifying private insurance and Illinois Medicaid (Source) to reduce or eliminate costs. For self-pay patients, the company offers income-based pricing, accepts some HSA/FSA funds, and provides financing through third-party "buy now, pay later" services.

Hey Jane also partners with nonprofit abortion funds that provide financial assistance to qualifying patients, making care more accessible regardless of income or insurance status. Their partnerships include:

- Access Reproductive Justice
- Aggie Fund
- Chicago Abortion Fund
- Cobalt Abortion Fund
- Colorado Doula Project
- Eastern Massachusetts Abortion Fund
- Indigenous Women Rising
- National Abortion Federation Hotline
- New Jersey Abortion Access Fund
- New York Abortion Access Fund
- Northwest Abortion Access Fund
- Ohio Women's Alliance
- Rhode Island Abortion Fund
- Wild West Fund of Nevada

== Advocacy ==
Hey Jane describes itself as both a health care provider and an advocate for abortion access. Notable campaigns include:

- Billboards in states bordering abortion bans, highlighting telehealth abortion availability in Illinois for patients in nearby Indiana and Missouri.
- The "Ready for Roevember" campaign with VoteAmerica in 2024, encouraging voter registration and community engagement around abortion rights impacted by key races and reforms.
- Participation in South by Southwest (SXSW) 2024 to highlight telehealth innovation in reproductive healthcare.

Hey Jane and its associated entities have participated in various amicus briefs, including several related to FDA v. Alliance for Hippocratic Medicine, which challenged the U.S. Food and Drug Administration's approval and regulation of mifepristone, one of the two medications used in medication abortion.

The company has also produced educational resources, including state-by-state and city-specific abortion access guides.

Hey Jane has reported repeated instances of its social media content being removed or restricted on platforms such as Instagram and TikTok, citing what the company describes as disproportionate enforcement of community guidelines against reproductive health content. Coverage in independent media has noted these incidents as part of a broader trend of abortion-related speech facing online censorship.

== Reception ==
Hey Jane has received coverage in major U.S. outlets. The New York Times profiled the company in 2022 as part of reporting on telehealth abortion post-Dobbs. Vogue highlighted surging demand on the day Dobbs was decided.

In addition to mainstream press, outlets such as Forbes and Cosmopolitan have highlighted its digital health model and expansion into new services.

== Research ==
Reproductive health researchers and policy groups have cited Hey Jane as a case study in how telehealth can mitigate clinic closures and restrictive laws.

Hey Jane was one of three virtual clinics that participated in the California Home Abortion by Telehealth (CHAT) study out of University of California San Francisco, which "followed pregnant people who obtained medication abortion via telehealth from three virtual clinics operating in 20 states and Washington, DC between April 2021 and January 2022." The research has resulted in a number of publications, including:

- Effectiveness and safety of telehealth medication abortion in the USA in Nature Medicine
- Interest in Rh testing and Rh immunoglobulin treatment among patients obtaining telehealth medication abortion in Contraception
- "It Was So Easy in a Situation That's So Hard": Structural Stigma and Telehealth Abortion in Journal of Health and Social Behavior
- The Role of Telehealth in Promoting Equitable Abortion Access in the United States: Spatial Analysis in Journal of Medical Internet Research

== In popular culture ==
Following the leak of the Supreme Court's draft decision in Dobbs v. Jackson Women's Health Organization, Hey Jane received public support from several celebrities, including Hailey Bieber, Lily Collins, Rosario Dawson, Ariana Grande, Kendall Jenner, Minka Kelly, and Demi Moore.

Hey Jane has been referenced in music, including the song 'Hey Jane' by Tyler, the Creator on his 2024 album Chromakopia.

== Awards and recognition ==
- 2023 Digital Health Awards – Rising Star Winner
- 2023 Fierce Healthcare Fierce 50 - Social Impact Winner
- 2023 Inc Female Founders 200 - Winner
- 2025 Shorty Impact Awards - Winner, Local Campaign
