= Chromakopia =

Studio album by Tyler, the Creator
- Released: October 28, 2024
- Genres: Hip-hop; R&B; jazz
- Length: 52:54
- Label: Columbia
- Producers: Tyler, the Creator

Tyler, the Creator chronology
| Call Me If You Get Lost (2021) | Chromakopia (2024) | Don't Tap the Glass (2025) |

Deluxe edition cover

Singles from Chromakopia
- 1. "Noid" Released: October 21, 2024; 2. "Sticky" Released: November 12, 2024; 3. "Like Him" Released: February 11, 2025

Chromakopia (stylized in all caps) is the eighth studio album by the American rapper Tyler, the Creator. It was released through Columbia Records on October 28, 2024, serving as the follow-up to Call Me If You Get Lost (2021). Chromakopia was written, produced, and arranged by Tyler himself. The album features guest appearances from Daniel Caesar, Doechii, GloRilla, LaToiya Williams, Lil Wayne, Lola Young, Santigold, Schoolboy Q, Sexyy Red, and Teezo Touchdown, with physical releases of the album additionally featuring Playboi Carti.

The album blends different genres like hip-hop, jazz, and soul, evocative of Tyler's previous releases Flower Boy (2017) and Igor (2019). Conceptually, Chromakopia is narrated by Tyler's mother, Bonita Smith, as a diary that pieces together Tyler's perspective on past timeline experiences separated by tracks. The album received widespread acclaim from critics, who praised the lyricism, cohesiveness, and production, and even noted its messy and confusing nature as a positive.

Chromakopia was supported by the singles "Noid", "Sticky", and "Like Him", as well as the promotional singles "St. Chroma" and "Thought I Was Dead". The album was a commercial success, debuting at number one in nine countries. In the United States, the album debuted at the top of the Billboard 200, earning Tyler his third US number-one album. Several other songs from the album also charted on the Billboard Hot 100, such as "Noid" and "St. Chroma". At the 68th Annual Grammy Awards, the album received nominations for Album of the Year, Best Rap Album and Best Album Cover, in addition to "Darling, I" receiving a nomination for Best Rap Performance and "Sticky" for Best Rap Song. In support of the album, Tyler embarked on Chromakopia: The World Tour between February 2025 and March 2026.

== Background and recording ==
On October 28, 2024, during Tyler, the Creator's Chromakopia exclusive listening event, Tyler revealed the meaning behind the album, noting that the album was originally about him growing up in Hawthorne, Inglewood. He revealed on stage that "no one knows anything about me from before I was like 17" and that the record turned into Tyler "taking a bunch of shit my mom told me as a kid." Tyler uploaded a video on his official YouTube channel titled "MASK IS OFF: CHROMAKOPIA" on November 12, 2024, which chronicles the creative process of the album, including behind-the-scenes clips from composition sessions, instrumentation arrangements and engineering work.

== Composition ==
=== Music ===
Primarily a hip-hop, R&B, and jazz album, Chromakopia embraces eclectic instrumentation. It blends musical styles reminiscent of Tyler's fourth and fifth albums Cherry Bomb (2015) and Flower Boy (2017), such as neo soul melodies and synthesizer-based arrangements. Military cadences and soulful elements are also present on the album. This is Tyler's first album since his second studio album, Goblin, to not have the 10th track on the album feature multiple titles and parts.

=== Themes and lyrics ===
Chromakopia is narrated by Tyler's mother, Bonita Smith. Its concept was inspired by his experience growing up in Greater Los Angeles and the life lessons he learned from Smith as a child, that he began to understand and appreciate as he grew older. Before the album's release, publications speculated that the album could be based on the story of Chroma the Great, a powerful conductor whose orchestra creates the colors of the world, from the 1961 children's novel The Phantom Tollbooth. Dork's Jake Hawkes notes the character ties into the album's aesthetics, but has little impact on the lyrical material.

Smith describes him as the light and tells him to never dim his light for anyone. "Rah Tah Tah" features braggadocious lyrics, as Tyler declares himself as the biggest rapper from Los Angeles after Kendrick Lamar. "Noid", on the other hand, explores his anxieties with celebrity culture and parasocial relationships. In "Darling, I", featuring vocals by Teezo Touchdown, Tyler reflects on his artistic ambition and the practice of monogamy.

Titled after the abortion-related healthcare company, "Hey Jane" stages a conversation between Tyler and an anonymous, older woman in the wake of an unplanned pregnancy. Billboard's Mackenzie Cummings-Grady wrote that on the record, Tyler "speaks on his consuming paranoia" while narrating his "desire for children".

== Release and promotion ==
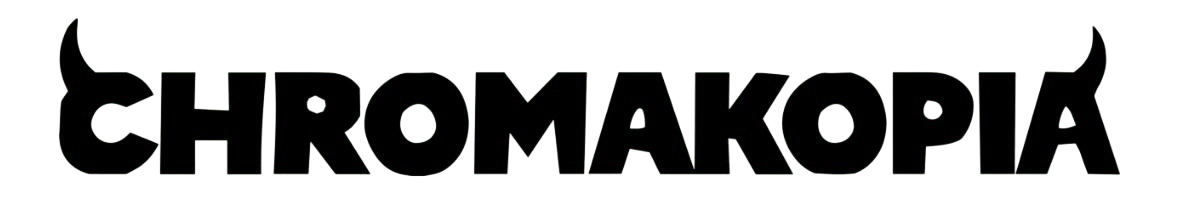
The Chromakopia album logo, using the font Poleno Semi Bold, with horn-like accents

Provoked by Beyoncé's surprise release of her 2013 self-titled album, the International Federation of the Phonographic Industry (IFPI) changed the day of the week when music is released worldwide from Tuesday to Friday. Tyler criticized the industry standard in a 2023 interview with Nardwuar, suggesting that it promotes "passive listening". He chose to release Chromakopia on Monday, October 28, 2024, at 6 a.m. ET.

Trucks and shipping containers promoting Chromakopia were spotted in various cities across the U.S., including Tyler, Houston, Dallas, Atlanta, Charlotte, Columbus, Philadelphia, Roswell, Phoenix, Hawthorne (Tyler's hometown), and Los Angeles. Shortly after the video for "St. Chroma" released, the phone number +1 (855) 444–8888, which was previously used as promotion for Call Me If You Get Lost, was changed to a voicemail concerning the "Chromakopia Trucking Company", where a voice said that all the company's drivers were unavailable and to call later. One day before its release, Tyler held an album listening party at Intuit Dome.

A deluxe edition of the album, titled Chromakopia+, was released on October 29, 2025. It includes the bonus track "Mother", which was previously exclusive to the album's vinyl LP release.

=== Singles ===
On October 16, 2024, Tyler posted a teaser for Chromakopia's opening track, "St. Chroma", on his social media accounts. He revealed the album's name, release date, and cover art the following day. The album's lead single, "Noid", was released on October 21. The following single, "Sticky" featuring GloRilla, Sexyy Red, and Lil Wayne, was released to rhythmic contemporary radio stations on November 12. "Like Him", featuring the British singer Lola Young, was released to rhythmic radio on February 11, 2025. A teaser for its eleventh track, "Thought I Was Dead", was shared on October 26. Three more songs were teased in a promotional video for the album's limited edition vinyl. On August 19, Tyler released the music video for "Darling, I".

=== Tour ===
Chromakopia: The World Tour was announced on October 23, 2024, with additional shows announced October 29, 2024. Promoted by AEG Presents, the tour featured Lil Yachty and Paris Texas as supporting acts, with 53 dates across North America, including the U.S. and Canada, 24 dates in Western Europe and the UK, and 12 shows scheduled in Oceania, covering Australia and New Zealand. The tour took place throughout 2025 and concluded on September 21, 2025.

== Critical reception ==
Chromakopia ratings
Aggregate scores
| Source | Rating |
|---|---|
| AnyDecentMusic? | 8.0/10 |
| Metacritic | 85/100 |
Review scores
| Source | Rating |
| AllMusic | 4/5 stars |
| Clash | 9/10 |
| Consequence | A− |
| The Daily Telegraph | 4/5 stars |
| The Guardian | 4/5 stars |
| The Line of Best Fit | 9/10 |
| NME | 3/5 stars |
| Pitchfork | 7.6/10 |
| Rolling Stone | 4/5 stars |
| Slant Magazine | 2.5/5 stars |

Chromakopia was met with widespread critical acclaim. At Metacritic, which assigns a normalized rating out of 100 to reviews from professional publications, the album received an average score of 85, based on 17 reviews. Aggregator AnyDecentMusic? gave it 8.0 out of 10, based on their assessment of the critical consensus.

Reviewing the album for AllMusic, David Crone claimed that, "Chromakopia is less of a cohesive statement than Tyler's fans are used to hearing; it's erratic and candid at once, a strange pressure cooker of boasts and doubts that falls out of step with its deftly sequenced and thematically tight predecessors." Writing for Clash, Niall Smith wrote that "the project's mid-section advances the album's winning streak", however, "while there aren't any outright weak tracks" on the record, occasionally, "the pacing feels slightly less focused than Tyler's previous work". Smith concluded that "while some elements feel a bit safe, the sound design is chiseled and sharper" while noting that the album showcases Tyler's "now-mastered style in HD glory". Consequence's Jonah Krueger wrote that "the maternal presence is felt throughout the tracklist" and that Tyler "[explores] his anxieties and trauma" throughout the record. Writing for Dork, Jake Hawkes noted that Chromakopia is a project "that bulges at the seams" and that "Tyler somehow wrangles it into something cohesive". Hawkes continued, "lyrically, Tyler seems at his most confessional in years", before concluding, stating that the album "has depth, it has worldbuilding, but just as importantly, it has some absolute bangers, too".

The Guardian's Alexis Petridis wrote that "tracks shift and slip their moorings, lurching from one sound to another" and that often, they change "completely over the course of a few minutes". Petridis concluded that "Chromakopia ultimately seems to manifest a state of confusion, in which everything is in flux and nothing is quite as it initially seems". Steven Loftin for The Line of Best Fit wrote that "Chromakopia's execution has been well thought out and finessed", however, "it is messy and it is truthful". Loftin expressed that the album "continues piecing together the Tyler, the Creator puzzle without making the picture any clearer". Tom Breihan, writing for Stereogum, mentioned the album's similarity with Kendrick Lamar's album Mr. Morale & the Big Steppers (2022), noting that Chromakopia is "Tyler's therapy record, his self-conscious attempt to figure his shit out in full view of the public". Billboard's Mackenzie Cummings-Grady wrote that the album "contains something for everyone" and that "within this universal and at times nostalgic construction, the album is also incredibly reflective".

Less enthusiastic reviews complained that the album's sound was too messy and chaotic. NME's Fred Garratt-Stanley regarded the album's sound as "deliberately messy" and the overall message about not trusting people as "lazy" but appreciated the themes and the honest and empathetic lyrics. Slant Magazine's Paul Attard similarly criticized the album's sound and the "overworked" composition, saying that "Tyler's ambitions on Chromakopia are grand, but the album attempts to do a lot while saying little".

=== Rankings ===
Chromakopia was featured on several publications' year-end lists of 2024. It was placed second by Clash and Complex, and within the top 10 by Billboard, BrooklynVegan, Crack, Dazed, Exclaim!, The Guardian, The Independent, The Ringer, and The Skinny. The album appeared in the top 20 of rankings by The A.V. Club, Consequence, KCRW, The Line of Best Fit, Paste, PopMatters, Rolling Stone, Stereogum, and Yardbarker. Chromakopia was also included in the top 50 of publications' lists like Time Out and NME, as well as in unranked compilations and honorable mentions done by Alternative Press, Cosmopolitan, HuffPost, Hypebeast, NPR, Uproxx, and Vulture. On individual critics' lists, the album was ranked fourth by Variety's Jem Aswad, and respectively tenth and eighth by Jim DeRogatis and Greg Kot, the hosts of Sound Opinions.

Select year-end rankings of Chromakopia
| Critic/Publication | List | Rank | Ref. |
|---|---|---|---|
| Billboard | The 50 Best Albums of 2024 | 7 | |
| Complex | The 50 Best Albums of 2024 | 2 | |
| Consequence | 50 Best Albums of 2024 | 14 | |
| Crack | The Top 50 Albums of 2024 | 10 | |
| Dazed | The 20 Best Albums of 2024 | 8 | |
| Exclaim! | Exclaim!'s 50 Best Albums of 2024 | 9 | |
| The Guardian | The 50 Best Albums of 2024 | 8 | |
| The Independent | The Best Albums of 2024 | 7 | |
| Paste | The 100 Best Albums of 2024 | 14 | |
| Variety | The Best Albums of 2024 | 4 | |

=== Industry awards ===
Awards and nominations for Chromakopia
| Ceremony | Year | Category | Result | Ref. |
|---|---|---|---|---|
| Grammy Awards | 2026 | Album of the Year | Nominated | |
| Grammy Awards | 2026 | Best Album Cover | Won | |
| Grammy Awards | 2026 | Best Rap Album | Nominated | |

== Commercial performance ==
Despite being released on Monday, Chromakopia debuted at number one on the US Billboard 200 chart with 299,000 album-equivalent units sold in its partial week along with 142,000 pure sales. Chromakopia surpassed Call Me If You Get Lost (169,000 units) as Tyler's biggest first week sales. The album also marked the biggest debut, by units, for a rap album released in 2024 at the time. The single "Noid" and the track "St. Chroma" peaked at number 10 and seven on the Billboard Hot 100, respectively, marking his first top 10 hits on that chart.

In Chromakopia's second week, the album earned 160,000 equivalent album units in the United States, securing a second consecutive week at number one on the Billboard 200 chart. On the Hot 100, "Sticky" jumped to a new peak of number 10, having debuted at number 14. The album became Tyler's first to spend multiple consecutive weeks at number one and to secure three songs in the Billboard Hot 100's top 10. It earned 104,000 units on its third week, securing the top spot on the Billboard 200.

The album debuted atop the UK Albums Chart. The single "Noid" and two other songs for the album charted on the UK Singles Chart: "Noid" (16), "St. Chroma" (15), and "Darling, I" (24). UK chart rules prevent artists from having more than three songs in the top 40 at once; without these rules, Chromakopia would have generated further new entries in the countdown. The album also debuted atop the Australian ARIA Charts, the Dutch Album Top 100, the Irish Albums Chart, the New Zealand RMNZ chart, the Portuguese Albums Chart, and the Scottish Albums Chart.

== Track listing ==
All tracks are written, produced, and arranged by Tyler Okonma, with additional writers noted. "Balloon" was additionally produced by Jayda Love.

Chromakopia track listing
| No. | Title | Writer(s) | Length |
|---|---|---|---|
| 1. | "St. Chroma" (featuring Daniel Caesar) | Ashton Simmonds | 3:17 |
| 2. | "Rah Tah Tah" | | 2:45 |
| 3. | "Noid" | Paul Nyirongo^{[a]} | 4:44 |
| 4. | "Darling, I" (featuring Teezo Touchdown) | Kamaal Fareed^{[b]}; Barry White^{[b]} | 4:13 |
| 5. | "Hey Jane" | | 4:00 |
| 6. | "I Killed You" | | 2:48 |
| 7. | "Judge Judy" | | 4:29 |
| 8. | "Sticky" (featuring GloRilla, Sexyy Red and Lil Wayne) | Gloria Woods; Dwayne Carter Jr.; Janae Wherry; Deanna Brown^{[c]}; Deidre Brown^{[c]}; Yamma Brown^{[c]}; David Brown^{[c]}; Timothy Clayton^{[c]}; Jamal Jones^{[c]}; Zachary Wallace^{[c]}; Elvis Williams^{[c]}; Rex Zamor; Timothy Mosley; Aaron Bolton; Dudley Duverne | 4:15 |
| 9. | "Take Your Mask Off" (featuring Daniel Caesar and LaToiya Williams) | Kathryn Thomas; Gregory Cook | 4:13 |
| 10. | "Tomorrow" | Simmonds | 3:02 |
| 11. | "Thought I Was Dead" (featuring Schoolboy Q and Santigold) | | 3:27 |
| 12. | "Like Him" (featuring Lola Young) | | 4:38 |
| 13. | "Balloon" (featuring Doechii) | Jaylah Hickmon; Luther Campbell^{[d]}; Harry Wayne Casey^{[d]}; Richard Finch^{[d]}; James Brown; Robert Ginyard | 2:34 |
| 14. | "I Hope You Find Your Way Home" | | 4:29 |
| Total length: | | | 52:54 |

CD and vinyl test pressing
| No. | Title | Writer(s) | Length |
|---|---|---|---|
| 1. | "St. Chroma" (featuring Daniel Caesar) | Simmonds | 3:06 |
| 8. | "Sticky" (featuring Sexyy Red and Lil Wayne) | Carter; Wherry; Deanna Brown^{[c]}; Deidre Brown^{[c]}; Y. Brown^{[c]}; David Brown^{[c]}; Clayton^{[c]}; Jones^{[c]}; Wallace^{[c]}; Williams^{[c]}; Zamor; Mosley; Bolton; Duverne | 4:28 |
| 11. | "Mother" | | 4:01 |
| 12. | "Thought I Was Dead" (featuring Playboi Carti and Santigold) | | 3:27 |
| 13. | "Like Him" (featuring Lola Young) | | 4:34 |
| Total length: | | | 54:24 |

Chromakopia+
| No. | Title | Length |
|---|---|---|
| 12. | "Mother" | 4:40 |
| 13. | "Like Him" (featuring Lola Young) | 4:39 |
| 14. | "Balloon" (featuring Doechii) | 2:34 |
| 15. | "I Hope You Find Your Way Home" | 4:29 |
| Total length: | | 57:43 |

=== Samples and composition notes ===
- ^{^[a]} "Noid" contains excerpts from "Nizakupanga Ngozi" (1977), written by Paul Nyirongo, performed by Ngozi Family.
- ^{^[b]} "Darling, I" contains a sample from "Vivrant Thing" (1999), written by Kamaal Fareed and Barry White, performed by Q-Tip.
- ^{^[c]} "Sticky" contains a sample from "Get Up Offa That Thing" (1976), written by Deanna Brown, Deidre Brown, and Yamma Brown, performed by James Brown; and a sample from "Get Buck" (2007), written by David Brown, Timothy Clayton, Jamal Jones, Zachary Wallace, and Elvis Williams, performed by Young Buck.
- ^{^[d]} "Balloon" contains excerpts from "I Wanna Rock" (1992), written by Luther Campbell, Harry Wayne Casey, and Richard Finch, performed by Luke and Rob Base.

== Personnel ==
=== Musicians ===
- Tyler Okonma – lead vocals, production, arrangement, executive production (all tracks)
- Daniel Caesar – featured vocals (tracks 1, 9), background vocals (tracks 6, 10), bass (track 10)
- Teezo Touchdown – featured vocals (track 4)
- GloRilla – featured vocals (track 8)
- Lil Wayne – featured vocals (track 8)
- Sexyy Red – featured vocals (track 8)
- LaToiya Williams – featured vocals (track 9)
- Schoolboy Q – featured vocals (track 11)
- Santigold – featured vocals (track 11), additional vocals (track 6)
- Playboi Carti – featured vocals (track 11) (Note: Playboi Carti only appears on the physical edition of the album.)
- Lola Young – featured vocals (track 12)
- Doechii – featured vocals (track 13)
- Bonita Smith – additional vocals (tracks 1, 3, 4–5, 9–15)
- Willow – additional vocals (track 3)
- Jazmine Freeman – additional vocals (track 8)
- Laila S. Freeman – additional vocals (track 8)
- Childish Gambino – background vocals (tracks 6, 7)
- Rex Orange County – background vocals (track 7)
- Justin Levy – background vocals (track 12)
- Robert Stevenson – background vocals (track 12)
- Pedro Martins – guitar (tracks 1, 3–6, 10)
- Thundercat – bass (tracks 3, 6, 7, 9, 12, 11b)
- Steve Lacy – guitar (track 7)
- Inflo – drums (track 3), additional vocals (track 3)
- Solange – background vocals (tracks 8, 14)
- Kevin Kendrick – piano (tracks 3, 7, 9, 14)
- Biako – guitar (track 10)
- Johnny May – strings (track 10), keyboard (track 13)
- Klynik – keyboard (track 13)
- Vic Wainstein – keyboard (track 13)
- Christopher Burns – horn (tracks 8, 11)
- Jason P. Freeman – horn (tracks 8, 11)
- Jerry E. Freeman Jr. – horn (tracks 8, 11)
- Kebbi Williams – horn (tracks 8, 11)
- Brandon Lee Brown – whistles (track 8)

=== Technical ===
- Vic Wainstein – engineering (all tracks)
- Tyler Okonma – recording engineering (all tracks)
- Neal H Pogue – mixing (all tracks)
- Mike Bozzi – mastering (all tracks)
- Andrew Keller – additional engineering (track 4)
- Childish Gambino – additional engineering (tracks 6, 7)
- Aaron Bolton – additional engineering (track 8)
- Adam Clark – additional engineering (track 8)
- Chris Carmouche – additional engineering (track 8)
- Manny Galvez – additional engineering (track 8)
- Mikaelin BlueSpruce – additional engineering (track 8)
- Salvador Majail – additional engineering (track 8)
- Romil Hemnani – additional engineering (track 11)
- Jayda Love – additional engineering (track 13)
- WavyBoyJodii – additional engineering (track 14)
- Zachary Acosta – engineering assistance (all tracks)
- Collin Clark – engineering assistance (track 4)
- Danforth Webster – engineering assistance (track 4)
- Garrett Duncan – engineering assistance (track 4)
- Jonathan Lopez Garcia – engineering assistance (track 4)
- Patrick Gardner – engineering assistance (track 4)
- Terena Dawn – engineering assistance (track 4)
- Jordan Schneider – engineering assistance (track 14)
- Nicole Llorens – engineering assistance (track 14)

== Charts ==
=== Weekly charts ===
2024 chart performance for Chromakopia
| Chart (2024) | Peak position |
|---|---|
| Australian Albums (ARIA) | 1 |
| Australian Hip Hop/R&B Albums (ARIA) | 1 |
| Austrian Albums (Ö3 Austria) | 3 |
| Belgian Albums (Ultratop Flanders) | 2 |
| Belgian Albums (Ultratop Wallonia) | 4 |
| Canadian Albums (Billboard) | 1 |
| Czech Albums (ČNS IFPI) | 3 |
| Danish Albums (Hitlisten) | 4 |
| Dutch Albums (Album Top 100) | 1 |
| Finnish Albums (Suomen virallinen lista) | 10 |
| French Albums (SNEP) | 19 |
| German Albums (Offizielle Top 100) | 4 |
| German Hip-Hop Albums (Offizielle Top 100) | 2 |
| Hungarian Albums (MAHASZ) | 7 |
| Icelandic Albums (Tónlistinn) | 3 |
| Irish Albums (Official Charts) | 1 |
| Italian Albums (FIMI) | 10 |
| Japanese Digital Albums (Oricon) | 42 |
| Lithuanian Albums (AGATA) | 2 |
| New Zealand Albums (RMNZ) | 1 |
| Nigerian Albums (TurnTable) | 60 |
| Norwegian Albums (VG-lista) | 2 |
| Polish Albums (ZPAV) | 4 |
| Portuguese Albums (AFP) | 1 |
| Scottish Albums (Official Charts) | 1 |
| Slovak Albums (ČNS IFPI) | 2 |
| Spanish Albums (Promusicae) | 7 |
| Swedish Albums (Sverigetopplistan) | 3 |
| Swiss Albums (Schweizer Hitparade) | 1 |
| UK Albums (Official Charts) | 1 |
| UK R&B Albums (Official Charts) | 1 |
| US Billboard 200 | 1 |
| US Top R&B/Hip-Hop Albums (Billboard) | 1 |

2025 chart performance for Chromakopia
| Chart (2025–2026) | Peak position |
|---|---|
| Croatian International Albums (HDU) | 39 |
| Greek Albums (IFPI) | 37 |

=== Year-end charts ===
2024 year-end chart performance for Chromakopia
| Chart (2024) | Position |
|---|---|
| Australian Albums (ARIA) | 74 |
| Australian Hip Hop/R&B Albums (ARIA) | 19 |
| Belgian Albums (Ultratop Flanders) | 106 |
| New Zealand Albums (RMNZ) | 42 |
| Swiss Albums (Schweizer Hitparade) | 67 |

2025 year-end chart performance for Chromakopia
| Chart (2025) | Position |
|---|---|
| Australian Albums (ARIA) | 27 |
| Belgian Albums (Ultratop Flanders) | 77 |
| Canadian Albums (Billboard) | 45 |
| French Albums (SNEP) | 180 |
| Icelandic Albums (Tónlistinn) | 73 |
| New Zealand Albums (RMNZ) | 27 |
| US Billboard 200 | 11 |
| US Top R&B/Hip-Hop Albums (Billboard) | 3 |

== Certifications ==
Certifications for Chromakopia
| Region | Certification | Certified units/sales |
|---|---|---|
| Belgium (BRMA) | Gold | 10,000^{‡} |
| Brazil (Pro-Música Brasil) | Gold | 20,000^{‡} |
| Canada (Music Canada) | Platinum | 80,000^{‡} |
| Denmark (IFPI Danmark) | Gold | 10,000^{‡} |
| France (SNEP) | Gold | 50,000^{‡} |
| New Zealand (RMNZ) | Platinum | 15,000^{‡} |
| Poland (ZPAV) | Gold | 15,000^{‡} |
| Portugal (AFP) | Gold | 3,500^{‡} |
| United Kingdom (BPI) | Gold | 100,000^{‡} |
| United States (RIAA) | Platinum | 1,000,000^{‡} |
^{‡} Sales+streaming figures based on certification alone.
