= Rah Tah Tah =

2024 song by Tyler, the Creator

Song by Tyler, the Creator

from the album Chromakopia
- Released: October 28, 2024
- Genre: West Coast hip-hop
- Length: 2:45
- Label: Columbia
- Songwriter: Tyler Okonma
- Producers: Tyler, the Creator

"Rah Tah Tah" is a song by American rapper and producer Tyler, the Creator, released as the second track from his eighth studio album, Chromakopia (2024).

== Composition ==
Inspired by West Coast and southern hip hop sound, the song revolves around the pressures of fame on Tyler, the Creator and his paranoia. Tyler also references the singer Usher and fellow Odd Future member Lionel Boyce's turn to acting, before proclaiming himself as the biggest rapper out of Los Angeles after Kendrick Lamar.

== Critical reception ==
The song received generally positive reviews. Alexander Cole of HotNewHipHop wrote, "As we heard in the song 'Noid,' one of the big concepts being talked about on the record is being paranoid. This certainly shines through on this track as Tyler seems out of his mind at points. His flow reflects that as he delves into inflections that we have never really heard from the artist. This is all backed up by some abrasive production that does a good job of illustrating Tyler's mental state." Steven Loftin of The Line of Best Fit stated "Igniting any semblance of fragility, the braggadocio chapter of 'Rah Tah Tah' is brief, lasting all of 2:45 – it'll keep the old-head ragers at bay". Jonah Krueger of Consequence called it "noisy, villainous, and sinful". Niall Smith of Clash commented, "the radio-worthy banger 'Rah Tah Tah' is like your go-to order at your favourite restaurant – predictable but nonetheless satisfying with each revisit." Paste's Matt Mitchell called the song a "maniacal rager", "featuring some of Tyler’s sneakiest lines yet". Paul Attard of Slant Magazine wrote "Despite some of the clunkers littered throughout 'Rah Tah Tah' ('Crib so damn big, I need a diaper and a sippy cup'), the hungry, give-no-fucks Tyler of the Goblin era is operating in full force here, his gruff voice traversing the track as if it's ready to start a brawl." Reviewing Chromakopia for AllMusic, David Crone described the song as part of the "militia-like opening trio" (alongside the songs "St. Chroma" and "Noid") that "creates a brilliant, unified new sound".

== Charts ==
=== Weekly charts ===
Weekly chart performance for "Rah Tah Tah"
| Chart (2024) | Peak position |
|---|---|
| Australia (ARIA) | 25 |
| Australia Hip Hop/R&B (ARIA) | 6 |
| Canada Hot 100 (Billboard) | 31 |
| Global 200 (Billboard) | 26 |
| Latvia (LaIPA) | 8 |
| Lithuania (AGATA) | 23 |
| Ireland (IRMA) | 27 |
| New Zealand (Recorded Music NZ) | 27 |
| South Africa (TOSAC) | 51 |
| UK Hip Hop/R&B (Official Charts) | 5 |
| UK Streaming (OCC) | 42 |
| US Billboard Hot 100 | 16 |
| US Hot R&B/Hip-Hop Songs (Billboard) | 5 |

=== Year-end charts ===
Year-end chart performance for "Rah Tah Tah"
| Chart (2025) | Position |
|---|---|
| US Hot R&B/Hip-Hop Songs (Billboard) | 69 |

== Certifications ==
Certifications for "Rah Tah Tah"
| Region | Certification | Certified units/sales |
|---|---|---|
| Canada (Music Canada) | Gold | 40,000^{‡} |
| United States (RIAA) | Platinum | 1,000,000^{‡} |
^{‡} Sales+streaming figures based on certification alone.
