= Sticky (Tyler, the Creator song) =

Single by Tyler, the Creator featuring GloRilla, Sexyy Red and Lil Wayne

from the album Chromakopia
- Released: November 12, 2024
- Genre: Southern hip-hop
- Length: 4:15; 4:28 (CD & vinyl test pressing version)
- Label: Columbia
- Songwriters: Tyler Okonma; Gloria Woods; Janae Wherry; Dwayne Carter Jr.; Deanna Brown; Deidre Brown; Yamma Brown; David Brown; Timothy Clayton; Jamal Jones; Zachary Wallace; Elvis Williams; Rex Zamor; Timothy Mosley; Aaron Bolton; Dudley Duverne; Zachary Anson Wallace
- Producers: Tyler, the Creator

Tyler, the Creator singles chronology
"Noid" (2024)	"Sticky" (2024)	"Like Him" (2025)

GloRilla singles chronology
"Whatchu Kno About Me" (2024)	"Sticky" (2024)	"In My Bag" (2024)

Sexyy Red singles chronology
"Whatchu Kno About Me" (2024)	"Sticky" (2024)	"Embrace It" (remix) (2024)

Lil Wayne singles chronology
"Ridin" (2024)	"Sticky" (2024)	"Pop It Off" (2025)

"Sticky" is a song by American rapper and producer Tyler, the Creator from his eighth studio album, Chromakopia, which features fellow American rappers GloRilla, Sexyy Red and Lil Wayne. It also features uncredited background vocals by Solange Knowles. It was released through Columbia Records on November 12, 2024, as the second single from the album. The song contains samples from "Get Up Offa That Thing" by James Brown and "Get Buck" by Young Buck.

== Critical reception ==
The song was well-received by music critics. Alexander Cole of HotNewHipHop commented the song has "very interesting features" and "Tyler has decided to hide his feature list, which is taking a page out of the Travis Scott playbook. Either way, it pays off as this will prove to be a nice surprise for a whole lot of fans." Steven Loftin of The Line of Best Fit commented it "bolsters things with a swaggering proverbial dick-swinging, before finding momentum once again after the low point of the meandering "Judge Judy". Consequence's Jonah Krueger called it "as fun-loving and sex-obsessed as Chromakopia gets". Clash's Niall Smith described it as a "mean-mug-worthy Southern rap detour" and part of the "winning streak" in the mid-section of Chromakopia. Jeff Ihaza of Rolling Stone called it the "posse cut of the ages". Writing for Slant Magazine, Paul Attard remarked "when he aims for a straight-up banger, like the pep-rally wannabe 'Sticky,' his try-hard sensibilities—layering in a brass section, a slew of truncated guest features delivering barely considered four-bar verses, and an extended outro—overwhelm any sense of excitement." Pitchfork's Heven Haile commented that "Black women rappers seem to remind Tyler there's more to making music at 33 than uber-serious lyrics", and in regard the song, wrote "The beat is simple; it sounds like he hired a live step team to record background vocals. You can tell he's just elated to be with the girlies and the refrain is destined to cling to your hippocampus." Reviewing the album for HipHopDX, Sam Moore commented "The only time Tyler actually sounds happy is when he hooks up with GloRilla, Sexyy Red and Lil Wayne on 'Sticky,' which he uses to forget about his mental strife for a moment to become raucously playful, going bar for bar with two of Hip Hop's hottest women as they rap about materialism and sex." Dork's Jake Hawkes described the song as "the kind of glorious, multi-layered mess we haven't heard since his Odd Future days – complete with guest verses from GloRilla, Lil Wayne, and Sexy Redd [sic], which give it the off-the-cuff energy of a rap cypher."

== Alternative version ==
On the Test Pressing Version 1 vinyl and CD test pressing versions of Chromakopia, GloRilla's verse is absent. Instead it was replaced by another verse from Tyler.

== Charts ==
=== Weekly charts ===
Weekly chart performance for "Sticky"
Chart (2024–2025)	Peak position
Australia (ARIA)	33
Australia Hip Hop/R&B (ARIA)	4
Canada Hot 100 (Billboard)	26
Global 200 (Billboard)	23
Ireland (IRMA)	63
Latvia (LaIPA)	18
Lithuania (AGATA)	50
New Zealand (Recorded Music NZ)	25
Poland (Polish Streaming Top 100)	99
South Africa (TOSAC)	61
UK Singles (OCC)	57
UK Hip Hop/R&B (OCC)	14
US Billboard Hot 100	10
US Hot R&B/Hip-Hop Songs (Billboard)	1
US Rhythmic Airplay (Billboard)	1

=== Year-end charts ===
Year-end chart performance for "Sticky"
Chart (2025)	Position
Canada (Canadian Hot 100)	90
Global 200 (Billboard)	157
US Billboard Hot 100	41
US Hot R&B/Hip-Hop Songs (Billboard)	9
US Rhythmic Airplay (Billboard)	19

== Certifications ==
Certifications for "Sticky"
Region	Certification	Certified units/sales
Canada (Music Canada)	Platinum	80,000^{‡}
New Zealand (RMNZ)	Platinum	30,000^{‡}
United Kingdom (BPI)	Silver	200,000^{‡}
United States (RIAA)	3× Platinum	3,000,000^{‡}
^{‡} Sales+streaming figures based on certification alone.

== Release history ==
Release dates and formats for "Sticky"
Region	Date	Format(s)	Label(s)	Ref.
United States	November 12, 2024	Rhythmic contemporary radio	Columbia	
