= Thought I Was Dead =

2024 song by Tyler, the Creator featuring Schoolboy Q and Santigold

Promotional single by Tyler, the Creator featuring Schoolboy Q and Santigold

from the album Chromakopia
- Released: October 28, 2024
- Genre: Hip hop
- Length: 3:27
- Label: Columbia
- Songwriter: Tyler Okonma
- Producers: Tyler, the Creator

Music video
- "Thought I Was Dead" on YouTube

"Thought I Was Dead" is a song by American rapper and producer Tyler, the Creator featuring fellow American rapper Schoolboy Q and American singer Santigold. It was released through Columbia Records as the eleventh track from the former's studio album, Chromakopia, on October 28, 2024. Physical releases of the album additionally feature American rapper Playboi Carti. The song was produced by Tyler, the Creator himself.

== Composition ==
The song has been considered similar in style to the music of Tyler, the Creator's album Cherry Bomb (2015). It contains a horn-led beat with a "busy" drum pattern, while Tyler uses a "bassy" delivery.

== Critical reception ==
The song received generally positive reviews. Elias Andrews of HotNewHipHop wrote of the song, "The chorus is simple and catchy. ScHoolboy Q, who also popped up on a stellar Cherry Bomb cut, brings his typical hybrid of menace and energy to the table. He's the perfect rapper to get on a beat this bizarre." Matt Mitchell of Paste wrote "Tyler and Schoolboy Q go toe-to-toe in a sparring match of dick-swinging verses". Fred Garratt-Stanley of NME commented the song has an "infectious hip-hop bite". Reviewing Chromakopia for Pitchfork, Heven Haile stated "Tyler is an amazing rapper when he wants to be, even on cartoony beats like 'Balloon' and 'Thought I Was Dead.'" Francis Buseko of The Quietus called the song "a powerful declaration of resilience that exudes Tyler's confidence, dismissing doubts and signalling his unapologetic survival."

== Controversy ==
In the lyrics, Tyler references his previous comments in an interview with marketer and media personality Maverick Carter ("White boys mockin' this shit, and y'all mad at me? Y'all can suck my dick / Pull up old tweets, pull up old t-shirts, all that; I moonwalk over that bitch") in which he criticized a "white kid" (allegedly rapper Ian) for mocking rappers like Future and Gucci Mane.

== Music video ==
A music video for the song was released on October 26, 2024, in promotion of Chromakopia. It was directed by Tyler, the Creator and shot by Luis "Panch" Perez. In it, Tyler is dressed in a military uniform as he dances, prances, marches and stands on the wing of a vintage airplane that appears to be delivering his Chromakopia shipping container in the middle of an airfield. He is also shown inside the carrier, in a pitch-black background wearing a flesh-toned mask. Men in suits stand guard around the aircraft. The clip is mainly filmed in a sepia tone, but Tyler's attire is revealed to be green in the end.

== Alternative version ==
An alternative version of the song featuring a guest verse from American rapper Playboi Carti appears on the vinyl and CD versions of Chromakopia as a bonus track.

== Live performances ==
During live performances, due to his asthma, Tyler, the Creator will often rap the first few lines of his second verse until transitioning into a spoken word version of the song. During the Camp Flog Gnaw Carnival in 2024, Tyler brought out Schoolboy Q by surprise to perform his verse. During Chromakopia: The World Tour, Tyler skips Schoolboy Q's verse, instead playing an alternate bridge, before performing his verse.

Tyler also performed this song (albeit with cleaner lyrics to fit broadcast standards) alongside "Sugar on My Tongue" at the 68th Annual Grammy Awards. The performance features his "St. Chroma" persona performing the song while overseeing construction on a vacant lot, before eventually getting run over by his "Big Poe" persona (an effect achieved through the use of a body double), who proceeds to kill himself by hiding in and blowing up a nearby gas station in an attempt to evade police. The performance also features a cameo by actress Regina King, who plays an auto-mechanic who imparts Tyler's "Big Poe" persona some words of wisdom.

== In other media ==
In 2025, an emote based on the song was added to Fortnite as a part of their Tyler, the Creator collab.

== Charts ==
=== Weekly charts ===
Weekly chart performance for "Thought I Was Dead"
Chart (2024)	Peak position
Australia (ARIA)	58
Canada Hot 100 (Billboard)	49
Global 200 (Billboard)	41
US Billboard Hot 100	32
US Hot R&B/Hip-Hop Songs (Billboard)	11

=== Year-end charts ===
Year-end chart performance for "Thought I Was Dead"
Chart (2025)	Position
US Hot R&B/Hip-Hop Songs (Billboard)	85

== Certifications ==
Certifications for "Thought I Was Dead"
Region	Certification	Certified units/sales
Canada (Music Canada)	Gold	40,000^{‡}
United States (RIAA)	Platinum	1,000,000^{‡}
^{‡} Sales+streaming figures based on certification alone.
