= IFHY =

2013 song by Tyler, the Creator featuring Pharrell

Song by Tyler, the Creator featuring Pharrell Williams

from the album Wolf
- Released: April 2, 2013
- Recorded: 2011–2013
- Genre: Alternative hip hop
- Length: 5:19
- Label: Odd Future
- Songwriter: Tyler Okonma
- Producers: Tyler, the Creator

Music video
- "IFHY" on YouTube

"IFHY" (an acronym for I Fucking Hate You) is a song by American rapper and producer Tyler, the Creator featuring Pharrell Williams from the former's third studio album, Wolf, released on April 2, 2013. The song was written and produced by Tyler, the Creator. The music video for "IFHY" was released on March 29, 2013. Some videos were released as early as March 27 of that same year.

== Background ==
"IFHY" is the first collaboration between Tyler, the Creator and Pharrell Williams. Tyler, the Creator has recounted many times about how Williams inspired him to take music more seriously; "I didn't have a father. I didn't have a big brother, I didn't have a cousin. So as a kid, since ten or eleven, Pharrell is who I looked at." The two would later collaborate on the video for another Wolf song, "Answer", and many other times throughout the decade, most recently on Tyler, the Creator's song "Big Poe".

In March 2013, Tyler, the Creator stated that Kanye West wanted to be on "IFHY" as well as another Wolf cut, "48", but was turned down. When asked why he refused, Tyler, the Creator stated, "cause it was mine. he wanted to be on IFHY too! but i was like, nah hahaha. ye is soo awesome, i talk to him almost everyday it seems like. its cool to have someone you can level with about art and everything else" [sic]. In July of that year, he would further comment:

"...I played him the album before it was finished and it was a song that he really, really liked on there and he really liked it a lot and he wanted to be on it or whatever. And the way I do features I specifically pick people for what they're featured on. And that song, it was nowhere where creative-wise where I thought he would fit on there. Kanye is one of the only few people in this industry that I consider a friend. I'll probably talk to him once a week and we just—we both have a love for art and we hate a lot of the same stuff. So, I don't want people to think that's a diss or like a side hit when I said I denied him."

== Composition and lyrics ==
"IFHY" features Tyler, the Creator under his alter-ego Sam struggling through a love-hate relationship after finding out his girlfriend, Salem, has gone out on a date with Wolf (one of Tyler's other alter-egos). The entire story of the Wolf album is centered around the three characters, who all attend "Camp Flog Gnaw", a camp for troubled teens.

Craig Jenkins of Pitchfork described "IFHY" as "a bit of Neptunes worship so adroit that its plinking synths and jazzy chord changes give way to a falsettoed coda from Pharrell himself". The instrumental of the song has been described as "jazzy" but also intense by multiple critics.

== Music video ==
=== Development ===
The video was directed by Tyler, the Creator under the alias "Wolf Haley", which has been a recurring theme in his videos. The filming of the video was a long and complicated process, as revealed in an interview with the video's producer Tara Razavi.

...We started talking about it towards the end of last year while Tyler was recording his album, and we just couldn't get to it. The first time we had to push it, we hadn't found the perfect girl. The second time, he had an allergic reaction to a dog... He had a very specific girl in mind; I was reaching out to every single modeling agency in the world, [and] of our top 10 girls, eight of them were on jobs out of the country. Brandy (the final actress) was actually at the top of our list too, but she was out of town. We've done a lot with Tyler, and I've never spent so much time looking for a person who was perfect.

=== Synopsis ===
Tyler portrays a doll living in a toy-like house. Tyler's portrayal of the doll character was described as particularly creepy and unsettling.

The music video for "IFHY" shows Tyler, the Creator as his character Wolf appearing in a dollhouse, sporting makeup to make him appear coated in plastic; his love interest is also doll-like. Wolf follows the female doll around the house, prompting her to lock herself in the bathroom. Wolf kicks down the door, before being picked up by a human hand and having his face burnt. The figure is then brought outside and ran over by a car driven by Hodgy and Sam (an alter-ego of Tyler), as another track from Wolf, "Jamba" plays. The rest of the video features them speeding around joyriding in a neighborhood, which Respect described as a "spoof of a stereotypical rap video." Although not present in the video, Williams' vocals still appear in the visual.

=== Reception ===
The video has been described as unsettling, creepy, and terrifying due to the uncanny nature of the visual effects, although this was a point of praise. It has also been described as an "emo" version of Barbie.

== Commercial performance ==
Although not released as a single, "IFHY" became one of Wolf's more popular songs, appearing on multiple US charts, most notably at number 24 on the US Heatseekers Songs, on the chart dated April 27, 2013.

On July 25, 2023, it was certified platinum by the Recording Industry Association of America for selling a total of one million units in the United States.

== Personnel ==
Credits adapted from the Wolf CD liner notes, and the official music video.

Musicians

- Tyler, the Creator – lead vocals, production, songwriting
- Pharrell Williams – featured vocals

Video

- Wolf Haley – video director
- Luis Ponch – director of photography
- Tara Razavi – executive production
- Brandi Bondoc – doll girl
- Hodgy – himself

Technical

- Vic Wainstein – recording
- Manny Marroquin – mixing
- Chris Galland – mix assistance
- Delbert Bowers – mix assistance
- Brian "Big Bass" Gardner – mastering
- Bernie Grundman – mastering

== Charts ==
Chart (2013)	Peak position
US Heatseekers Songs (Billboard)	24
US Hot R&B/Hip-Hop Songs (Billboard)	47
US Rap Digital Songs (Billboard)	41

== Certifications ==
Region	Certification	Certified units/sales
New Zealand (RMNZ)	Gold	15,000^{‡}
United States (RIAA)	Platinum	1,000,000^{‡}
^{‡} Sales+streaming figures based on certification alone.
