= Like Him =

2025 single by Tyler, the Creator featuring Lola Young

Single by Tyler, the Creator featuring Lola Young

from the album Chromakopia
- Released: February 11, 2025
- Genre: Neo-soul
- Length: 4:38
- Label: Columbia
- Songwriter: Tyler Okonma
- Producers: Tyler, the Creator

Tyler, the Creator singles chronology
"Sticky" (2024)	"Like Him" (2025)	"Ring Ring Ring" (2025)

Lola Young singles chronology
"Charlie" (2024)	"Like Him" (2025)	"One Thing" (2025)

"Like Him" is a song by American rapper and producer Tyler, the Creator from his eighth studio album, Chromakopia (2024). It features English singer Lola Young, and was written and produced entirely by Tyler. It was sent to US rhythmic radio on February 11, 2025, as the third single from Chromakopia.

The track has received widespread acclaim from both critics and listeners, and is widely regarded as one of the standout songs on the album. The song also hit several charts, including number 29 on the Billboard Hot 100, and was certified 2× platinum by the Recording Industry Association of America (RIAA).

== Composition ==
The song includes soul elements and piano-led production. In the lyrics, Tyler, the Creator dwells on his conflicted feelings regarding his upbringing and growing up with an absent father, wondering if he would end up like him. Tyler reflects on his resemblance to his father, which his mother has always shown awe in, and sings about him "chasing a ghost" as he never knew him. The outro features a message from his mother, who takes responsibility for his father's estrangement from the family due to her poor choices and confesses that he had always wanted to be involved in Tyler's life.

== Alternate version ==
On the Test Pressing Version 1 vinyl and CD versions of the album, this song has a second verse from Tyler as well as a few unfinished/mumble lyrics.

== Charts ==
=== Weekly charts ===
Weekly chart performance for "Like Him"
Chart (2024–2025)	Peak position
Australia (ARIA)	55
Canada Hot 100 (Billboard)	43
Global 200 (Billboard)	37
France (SNEP)	147
Ireland (IRMA)	28
Netherlands (Single Top 100)	100
New Zealand (Recorded Music NZ)	28
Sweden Heatseeker (Sverigetopplistan)	16
UK Singles (Official Charts)	30
US Billboard Hot 100	29
US Hot R&B/Hip-Hop Songs (Billboard)	6
US Rhythmic Airplay (Billboard)	7

=== Year-end charts ===
Year-end chart performance for "Like Him"
Chart (2025)	Position
Global 200 (Billboard)	140
US Billboard Hot 100	62

== Certifications ==
Certifications for "Like Him"
Region	Certification	Certified units/sales
Belgium (BRMA)	Gold	20,000^{‡}
Canada (Music Canada)	Platinum	80,000^{‡}
France (SNEP)	Gold	100,000^{‡}
Mexico (AMPROFON)	Platinum	140,000^{‡}
New Zealand (RMNZ)	Platinum	30,000^{‡}
United Kingdom (BPI)	Gold	400,000^{‡}
United States (RIAA)	2× Platinum	2,000,000^{‡}
Streaming
Central America (CFC)	Gold	3,500,000^{†}
^{‡} Sales+streaming figures based on certification alone.^{†} Streaming-only figures based on certification alone.

== Release history ==
Release history for "Like Him"
Region	Date	Format(s)	Label(s)	Ref.
United States	February 11, 2025	Rhythmic contemporary radio	Columbia	
