= St. Chroma =

2024 song by Tyler, the Creator featuring Daniel Caesar

Promotional single by Tyler, the Creator featuring Daniel Caesar

from the album Chromakopia
- Released: October 28, 2024
- Genre: Hip-hop; R&B; neo-soul
- Length: 3:17
- Label: Columbia
- Songwriters: Tyler Okonma; Ashton Simmonds
- Producers: Tyler, the Creator

Music video
- "St. Chroma" on YouTube

"St. Chroma" is a song by American rapper and producer Tyler, the Creator featuring Canadian singer Daniel Caesar. It was released on Tyler, the Creator's eighth studio album, Chromakopia (2024), released through Columbia Records. The song is a hip-hop, R&B, and neo-soul record. It was written by Tyler, the Creator and Caesar themselves, with the former also producing the song. The song was released as a promotional single on the October 28, 2024, the same day the album was released.

Upon its release, the song was positively received by music critics, who praised the instrumentation and vocals. Commercially, the song charted at number 7 on the Billboard Hot 100, becoming Tyler, the Creator's highest-peaking song on the chart. It also topped the Hot R&B/Hip-Hop Songs chart, and peaked within the top 10 of charts in Australia, Ireland, Latvia, Lithuania, and the United Kingdom. It was additionally certified Platinum in the United States. A brief music video served as the album's trailer.

== Background and composition ==
The song is a hip-hop, R&B, and neo-soul record. It was written by Tyler, the Creator and Caesar themselves, with the former also producing the song. The song finds Tyler, the Creator rapping in a whispering tone, over a beat consisting of marching stomps and handclaps, synthesizers, choir and flute. Daniel Caesar performs in soulful vocals reminiscent of gospel, singing "Can you feel the light inside? Can you feel that fire?" The artists' vocals also intertwine during this part. The title refers to Tyler, the Creator's new alter-ego.

== Critical reception ==
The song was acclaimed by music critics. Tom Breihan of Stereogum remarked, "Judging by its brief length and past precedent, the video probably doesn't include the entire song. What we hear, however, is awesome. Tyler raps in a menacing whisper over marching boots, eerie John Carpenter-ass synths, and gospel-informed choirs. Just as the video ends, the beat drops and immediately slides into the chaotic Playboi Carti song. Mission accomplished. I'm excited." Niall Smith of Clash stated "The march-bound opener 'St. Chroma' sets pace pretty effectively. The song's soulful vocals crescendo into a fiery, sweltering cocktail of self-doubt, rumbling drums and mantras of anti-fame." Jeff Ihaza of Rolling Stone wrote of the song, "a familiar constellation of sounds that arrives with a level of precision that seems final, as if Tyler's now seen his signature sound to completion. Tyler's penchant for angelic-sounding string arrangements is at its most potent on the track, with vocals from Daniel Caesar, while, lyrically, he's vibrant and dynamic, switching up his flow as he brags from a place less material and more metaphysical."

Heven Haile of Pitchfork wrote, "A flute mimicking ululations sounds like a battle cry under militaristic stomps on opener 'St. Chroma.' Tyler whisper-raps as if to say, Listen close, I have something important to tell you. That, along with Daniel Caesar's ethereal gospel vocals asking 'Can you feel that fire?' and a modular synth speeding up its frequency like a kettle about to blow, makes it feel like we're traversing space and time straight into Tyler's psyche." David Crone of AllMusic considered it "Tyler's strongest intro to date", calling it "an immediate collage of intent, flip-flopping from scratchy militarism to soaring gospel", and described the song as part of a "militia-like opening trio" (alongside the songs "Rah Tah Tah" and "Noid") that "creates a brilliant, unified new sound".

== Commercial performance ==
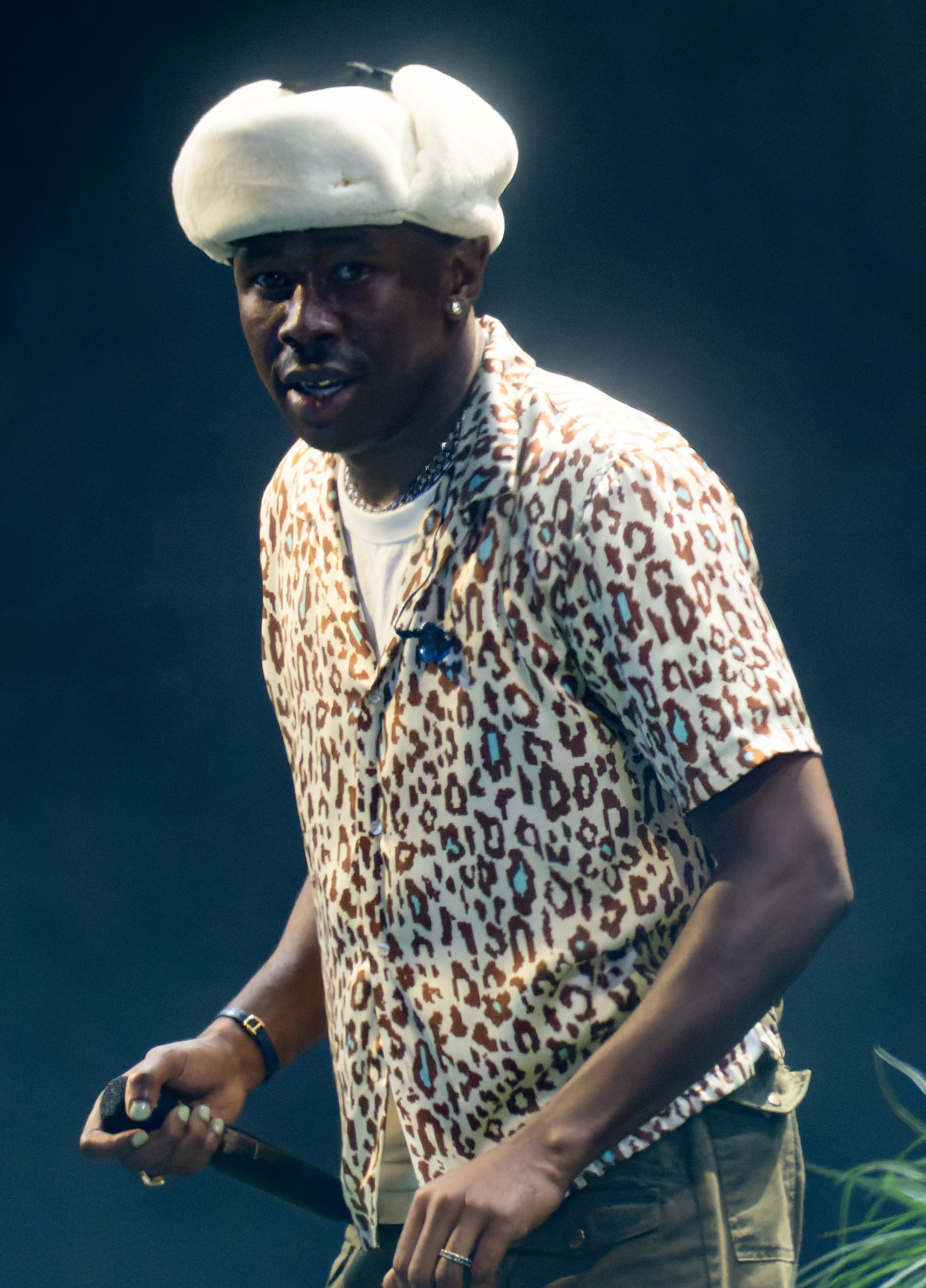
Tyler, the Creator (pictured) achieved his highest-charting song on the Billboard Hot 100 with "St. Chroma".

In the United States, the song charted at number 7 on the Billboard Hot 100, becoming Tyler, the Creator's highest-charting song on the Hot 100 to date. It would also top the Hot R&B/Hip-Hop Songs chart. It would later be certified Platinum by the Recording Industry Association of America (RIAA) for equivalent sales of 1,000,000 units in the country. In Australia, the song charted at number 15 on the Australian Singles Chart and peaked at number 2 on their Hip-Hop/R&B chart. In Canada, the song charted at number 21 on the Canadian Hot 100. It would later be certified Gold by Music Canada (MC) for equivalent sales of 40,000 units in the country. In New Zealand, the song charted at number 11 on the New Zealand Singles Chart. In the United Kingdom, the song charted at number 15 on the UK Singles Chart and peaked at number 2 on the UK Hip Hop/R&B Chart. The song also charted at number 10 on the Global 200.

In the Czech Republic, the song charted at number 71 on the Singles Digital Top 100 chart. In Iceland, the song charted at number 10 on the Tónlistinn chart. In Ireland, the song charted at number 10 on the Irish Singles Chart. In Latvia, the song charted at number 4 on the Latvian Music Producers Association (LalPA) charts. In Lithuania, the song charted at number 9 on the AGATA charts. In Netherlands, the song charted at number 53 on the Dutch Single Top 100. In Norway, the song charted at number 37 on the VG-lista chart. In Poland, the song charted at number 41 on the Polish Streaming Top 100. In Slovakia, the song charted at number 48 on their Singles Digital Top 100. In South Africa, the song charted at number 20 on The Official South African Charts. In Sweden, the song charted at number 93 on the Sverigetopplistan chart. In Switzerland, the song charted at number 43 on the Schweizer Hitparade.

== Music video ==
A music video was released for the song on October 16, 2024, and was the first promotional material for the album. Initially shot with a sepia filter, a masked Tyler (also known with the pseudonym "St.Chroma") with a green suit leads a line of 10 men wearing matching suits, their faces hidden. Tyler steps out of the line and directs the men to a large green shipping container with the Chromakopia logo spray-painted on the front. The men go inside, as well as Tyler who rejoins the line. The container closes, and Tyler appears in the foreground and detonates the container via button press. At the end of the video, it cuts to the word "Chromakopia" in all black against a solid green background.

== Charts ==
=== Weekly charts ===
Weekly chart performance for "St. Chroma"
| Chart (2024) | Peak position |
|---|---|
| Australia (ARIA) | 15 |
| Australia Hip Hop/R&B (ARIA) | 2 |
| Canada Hot 100 (Billboard) | 21 |
| Czech Republic Singles Digital (ČNS IFPI) | 71 |
| Global 200 (Billboard) | 10 |
| Iceland (Tónlistinn) | 13 |
| Ireland (IRMA) | 10 |
| Israel (Mako Hitlist) | 77 |
| Latvia Streaming (LaIPA) | 4 |
| Lithuania (AGATA) | 9 |
| Netherlands (Single Top 100) | 53 |
| New Zealand (Recorded Music NZ) | 11 |
| Norway (VG-lista) | 37 |
| Poland (Polish Streaming Top 100) | 41 |
| Slovakia Singles Digital (ČNS IFPI) | 48 |
| South Africa (TOSAC) | 20 |
| Sweden (Sverigetopplistan) | 93 |
| Switzerland (Schweizer Hitparade) | 43 |
| UK Singles (Official Charts) | 15 |
| UK Hip Hop/R&B (Official Charts) | 2 |
| US Billboard Hot 100 | 7 |
| US Hot R&B/Hip-Hop Songs (Billboard) | 1 |

=== Year-end charts ===
Year-end chart performance for "St. Chroma"
| Chart (2025) | Position |
|---|---|
| US Hot R&B/Hip-Hop Songs (Billboard) | 32 |

== Certifications ==
Certifications for "St. Chroma"
| Region | Certification | Certified units/sales |
|---|---|---|
| Canada (Music Canada) | Gold | 40,000^{‡} |
| New Zealand (RMNZ) | Gold | 15,000^{‡} |
| United Kingdom (BPI) | Silver | 200,000^{‡} |
| United States (RIAA) | Platinum | 1,000,000^{‡} |
^{‡} Sales+streaming figures based on certification alone.
