= Modern Jam =

2023 song by Travis Scott featuring Teezo Touchdown

Song by Travis Scott featuring Teezo Touchdown

from the album Utopia
- Released: July 28, 2023
- Recorded: October 5, 2012 - 2022
- Studio: Miraval (Correns); Shangri-La (California)
- Genre: Hip hop; electro
- Length: 4:15
- Label: Cactus Jack; Epic
- Songwriters: Jacques Webster II; Aaron Thomas; Guillaume Emmanuel de Homem-Christo; Jahaan Sweet; Michael Dean
- Producers: Scott; Guy-Manuel de Homem-Christo; Sweet (add.); Mike Dean (add.)

Music video
- "Modern Jam" on YouTube

"Modern Jam" is a song by American rapper Travis Scott featuring fellow American rapper Teezo Touchdown, from the former's fourth studio album, Utopia (2023). The song was produced by Scott and Guy-Manuel de Homem-Christo, with additional production from Jahaan Sweet and Mike Dean. The song was certified Gold by the Recording Industry Association of America (RIAA) in August 2024.

== Background ==
"Modern Jam" uses elements originally created by Homem-Christo and Scott during 2012 for an early version of "I Am A God" by Kanye West, from his 2013 album Yeezus.

== Composition ==
The instrumental of the song contains synths and muted yells in the background. Travis Scott imitates the flow of "I Am a God" by Kanye West.

== Critical reception ==
The song received mixed reviews. Complex's Ecleen Luzmila Caraballo deemed it one of the best songs from Utopia, saying she enjoyed the "experimentation" and "I can see myself adding it to some of my energy-infusing intended playlists. It's not an easy listen and was jarring at first, but the chaos is almost what makes it ensnaring." Tom Breihan of Stereogum praised the feature, writing "Teezo Touchdown's operatic glam-rock vocals on 'Modern Jam' seem to come out of nowhere." Regarding the production, Vivian Medithi of HipHopDX commented "Guy-Manuel de Homem-Christo's rounded-off 808s provide a deliciously flubbery springboard for Scott's best clunkers." Rolling Stone's Andre Gee commented the song "feels like an ode to Eighties hip-hop that's subtle enough to not feel gimmicky." Shaad D'Souza of The Guardian stated it "feels like an AI recreation" of "I Am a God", further writing, "the track is grand and gothic, Scott's preferred mode, but pales in comparison with its 10-year-old antecedent. A decade later, few have managed to combine abrasive electronics and dick jokes quite like West, and a line such as 'Dick so hard, pokin' like the Eiffel' just isn't as funny or as blithely stupid as anything on Yeezus".

Complex's Jordan Rose regarded the moments of Scott's imitation of Kanye West's style on Utopia to be the worst thing about the album, mentioning "Modern Jam" as an example. Nathan Evans of NME wrote the song "gives early signs of the record's issues with forcing invigorating ideas into dull ones. Teezo Touchdown gives a spectacularly theatrical performance that sounds like André 3000 singing in a cabaret, but this is after one of the stalest performances of Scott's career over a stiff drum loop that came from Daft Punk's Guy-Man de Homem-Christeo [sic], his first piece of music since the French duo's split in 2021." Alphonse Pierre of Pitchfork wrote, "'Modern Jam' features some embarrassingly uninspired stripped-down rapping by Travis. But oooh the mildly funky beat is co-produced by Guy-Manuel de Homem-Christo of Daft Punk!" Vulture's Craig Jenkins wrote that the song "complains about being unable to tour without tapping into the gravity of why, which is a shame, since some of the most intriguing moments in Travis's audiovisual presentation happen when he stops flexing and offers a glimpse into the determination under the hood."

Mackenzie Cummings-Grady of Billboard ranked it as the second best song from Utopia.

== Music video ==
The music video was directed by Gaspar Noé. (Note: Stated in the end credits of Circus Maximus.) The music video is a segment in the film Circus Maximus (2023). The video takes place in a dance club, where Travis is the DJ, wearing a gold and black eye mask, reminiscent of the Daft Punk helmet formerly worn by the song's producer and co-writer Guy-Manuel de Homem-Christo. The video has epileptic imagery with 1980s-style transitions throughout. The video was registered in France.

== Charts ==
Chart performance for "Modern Jam"
Chart (2023)	Peak position
Australia (ARIA)	27
Australia Hip Hop/R&B (ARIA)	13
Canada Hot 100 (Billboard)	23
Czech Republic Singles Digital (ČNS IFPI)	29
France (SNEP)	33
Global 200 (Billboard)	18
Greece International (IFPI)	54
Iceland (Plötutíðindi)	14
Italy (FIMI)	46
Latvia (LAIPA)	17
Lithuania (AGATA)	39
New Zealand (Recorded Music NZ)	23
Norway (VG-lista)	36
Poland (Polish Streaming Top 100)	30
South Africa (Billboard)	23
Sweden Heatseeker (Sverigetopplistan)	3
UK Audio Streaming (Official Charts)	45
US Billboard Hot 100	23
US Hot R&B/Hip-Hop Songs (Billboard)	13

== Certifications ==
Certifications for "Modern Jam"
Region	Certification	Certified units/sales
Brazil (Pro-Música Brasil)	Platinum	40,000^{‡}
Canada (Music Canada)	Gold	40,000^{‡}
United States (RIAA)	Gold	500,000^{‡}
^{‡} Sales+streaming figures based on certification alone.
