= Avenue of the Saints Amphitheater =

- Location within Iowa
- Coordinates: 41.29°N 93.80°W
- Capacity: 18,000

Website
- http://theavenueofthesaints.com/

The Avenue of the Saints Amphitheater is an outdoor event space in St. Charles, Iowa.

The venue opened in 2013, and has a maximum capacity of 18,000.
