= Butoconazole =

Chemical compound

Clinical data
- Trade names: Gynazole-1, Mycelex-3
- AHFS/Drugs.com: Monograph
- MedlinePlus: a682012
- License data: US DailyMed: Butoconazole
- Pregnancy category: AU: B3
- Routes of administration: Vaginal cream
- ATC code: G01AF15 (WHO)

Legal status
- Legal status: US: OTC / Rx-only

Identifiers
- IUPAC name: (RS)-1-[4-(4-Chlorophenyl)-2-(2,6-dichlorophenyl)sulfanylbutyl]imidazole
- CAS Number: 64872-76-0; 64872-77-1
- PubChem CID: 47472
- DrugBank: DB00639
- ChemSpider: 43192
- UNII: 0Q771797PH
- KEGG: D00880
- ChEBI: CHEBI:3240
- ChEMBL: ChEMBL1295
- CompTox Dashboard (EPA): DTXSID2048537

Chemical and physical data
- Formula: C_{19}H_{17}Cl_{3}N_{2}S
- Molar mass: 411.77 g·mol^{−1}
- 3D model (JSmol): Interactive image
- SMILES: Clc1ccc(cc1)CCC(Sc2c(Cl)cccc2Cl)Cn3ccnc3
- InChI: InChI=1S/C19H17Cl3N2S/c20-15-7-4-14(5-8-15)6-9-16(12-24-11-10-23-13-24)25-19-17(21)2-1-3-18(19)22/h1-5,7-8,10-11,13,16H,6,9,12H2; Key:SWLMUYACZKCSHZ-UHFFFAOYSA-N

Butoconazole (trade names Gynazole-1, Mycelex-3) is an imidazole antifungal used in gynecology. It is administered as a vaginal cream.
