= Teezo Touchdown =

American singer (born 1992)

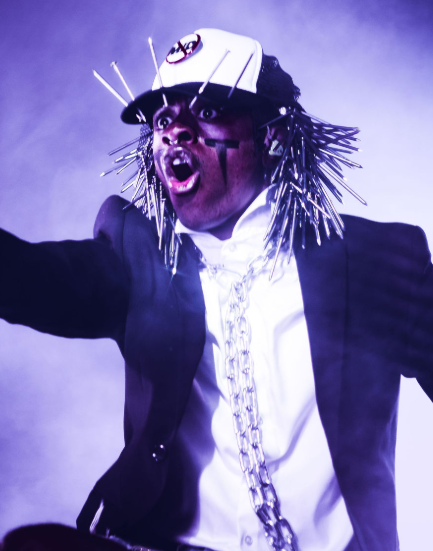
- Teezo Touchdown in 2024

Background information
- Also known as: Teezo Suave; AyeTee; Tony Touchdown
- Born: Aaron Lashane Thomas; October 31, 1992 (age 34); Beaumont, Texas, U.S.
- Genres: Alternative hip-hop; rap rock
- Occupations: Rapper; singer; songwriter; record producer
- Instrument: Vocals
- Years active: 2016–present
- Labels: Not Fit for Society; RCA
- Website: teezotouchdownmusic.com

Aaron Lashane Thomas (born October 31, 1992), known professionally as Teezo Touchdown, is an American rapper, singer, songwriter, and record producer. On September 8, 2023, Thomas released his debut studio album, How Do You Sleep at Night?, and embarked on the Spend the Night Tour the following year to promote the album. He is also known for his collaborations with Tyler, the Creator, Drake, and fellow Texas natives Don Toliver and Travis Scott. He also went on tour with the former three artists, serving as an opening act for each of them.

== Early life ==
Thomas was born in Beaumont, Texas, to a father who works as a DJ. He was surrounded by music from multiple genres as a child due to his father's career. As a result, he grew up listening to a wide range of artists such as Judas Priest, Prince, Kraftwerk, and Marvin Gaye. Throughout his youth, he learned to DJ and produce music through using his father's equipment.

== Career ==
=== 2010–2019: Career beginnings ===
While attending high school in Beaumont, Texas, Thomas began uploading music to YouTube under the names AyeTee, TeeKnow, and later Teezo Suave. He filmed early music videos in his high school, which received little attention, and produced songs for rappers in his city.

In 2016, he changed his stage name to Teezo Touchdown. Around this time, he began collaborating with musical collective CVKE Supply, who uploaded the music videos for his songs "Professional" Produced by Sammi Automatic and "It Depends" Produced by Chase Raccs to YouTube in 2017. In 2018, he released two mixtapes, titled "The Example" and "Cover Boy".

In February 2019, he released the song "100 Drums" with producer Coop, which was described by NME as, "[a rap song] about the gun violence in his hometown over Panic! At The Disco’s breakout emo-pop anthem 'I Write Sins, Not Tragedies'". Pitchfork opined on the song, stating "when will rappers understand that liking one of the most popular songs of the 2000s is not as different as they think?" The video garnered attention on social media and led to co-signs by Chance The Rapper and Trippie Redd. In November 2019, he collaborated with Coop again on the song "Slice".

=== 2020–present: Viral success, Call Me If You Get Lost tour, and fashion ===
In July 2020, Thomas released three singles, "Strong Friend", "Careful", and "Sucka" featuring Fred Flippstone. About "Sucka", Pitchfork stated the song lacked "the ear for production, nimble flow switch-ups, or, well, talent." Each song was released with a music video directed by Thomas. In October 2020, he released the singles "Rooting For You" and "Bad Enough" featuring Thomas Lopez with accompanying music videos. In November 2020, he released the single "Social Cues" with an accompanying music video.

In February 2021, he released the single "Technically" with an accompanying music video and made a guest appearance in the music video for Fousheé's song "Single AF". In June 2021, he featured on the song "RunItUp" with Tyler, the Creator, which Pitchfork called "unmemorable". In the same month, he released a series of song covers in a video titled "Coverboy2". The video acted as a sequel to his 2018 mixtape "Cover Boy" and included an interview with Replica Man Magazine. He was styled in Balenciaga for the magazine's cover shoot.

In July 2021, he made an appearance on Kenny Beats' YouTube series "The Cave" and freestyled over an instrumental that the two created together. He also released his single "Mid" and began his "Rid the Mid" campaign on social media in promotion for the single. The campaign consisted of a series of Instagram skits in which he ran for mayor in the fictional city of "Midville" and detailed what he would do if elected. Some of his policies included making it illegal to steal someone else's lighter and making it illegal for one's barber to push back their hairline.

In September 2021, he modeled for Marc Jacobs's Heaven collection and performed his song "I'm Just A Fan" for Moncler and Alyx's Mondo Genius event. In October 2021, he appeared in a commercial for Telfar's "Bag Security Program III".

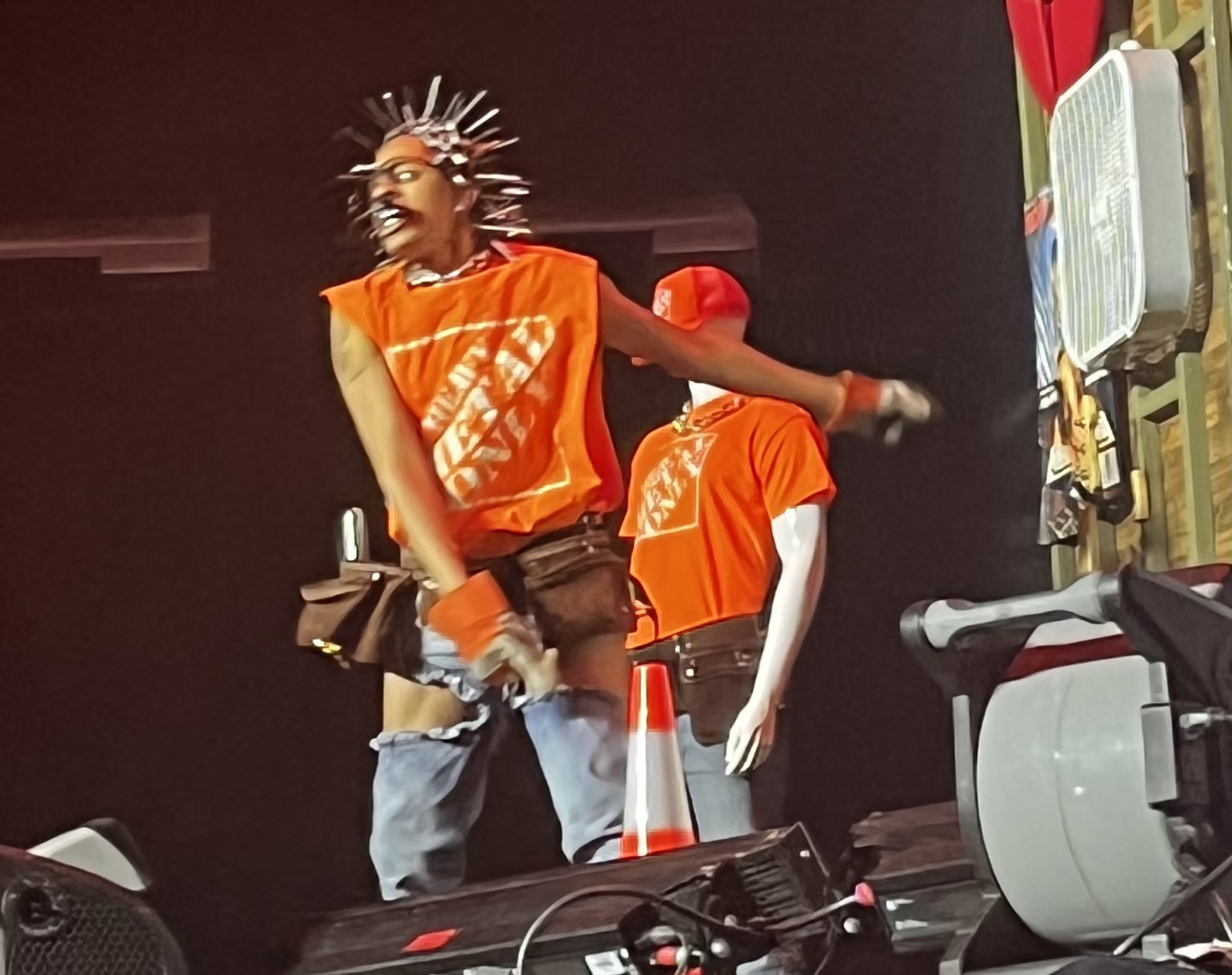
Teezo Touchdown performing as an opening act for Tyler, the Creator in 2022

On February 10, 2022, he began touring in the United States with Tyler, the Creator, Vince Staples, and Kali Uchis on the Call Me If You Get Lost Tour, to support the release of Tyler's album Call Me If You Get Lost. He also released the single "Handyman" with producer Kenny Beats. On March 6, 2021, his web series Watch Your Step premiered on Telfar TV, an online streaming platform created by American fashion label Telfar. The series is composed of sketch comedy shorts that promote Telfar products.

In January 2023, he was a non-credited feature on Lil Yachty's Let's Start Here track, "The Ride". In July 2023, Teezo Touchdown was featured on Travis Scott’s album Utopia on the song “Modern Jam”, which includes his vocal contribution. On September 8, 2023, he released his debut album, How Do You Sleep at Night?, with guest appearances from Janelle Monáe, Fousheé, and Isaiah Rusk. In October 2023, Teezo Touchdown was featured on Drake’s album For All the Dogs on the track “Amen”.

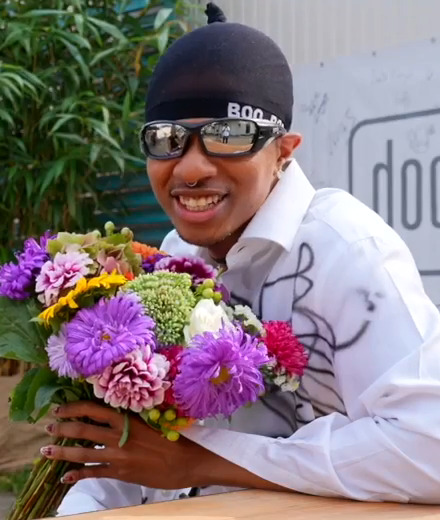
Teezo Touchdown in 2024

In May 2024, Teezo Touchdown was featured on Doja Cat's album Scarlet 2: CLAUDE on the track "MASC". In October 2024, Teezo Touchdown was featured on the song "Darling, I" from Tyler, the Creator's album Chromakopia. In September 2025, Teezo Touchdown was featured on the song "What you Want (feat. Teezo Touchdown)" from Cortis's album Color Outside The Lines.

== Artistry ==
=== Influences ===
Thomas is influenced by '80s icons as well as 2010s rappers and R&B singers such as The Smiths, Rick James, Future, Frank Ocean, Lil Jon and Prince; as he told Pigeons & Planes, “What those artists are to me is a point of reference.”

=== Musical style ===
Thomas' music pulls influences from a variety of genres. Dazed has described Thomas as, "...a delightfully weird, genre-defying enigma who, without breaking a sweat, combines hip-hop, autotune, radio pop, country music, trap beats, emo-punk, acoustic arpeggios and whatever else is in his brain into infectious, digestible three-minute earworms." Thomas is now known for his prolific features, commonly greatly boosting the popularity of a track.

About his musical style, Thomas said, “I’m never chasing a sound because that would just be satire. Rather than trying to copy a sound, I look at what all this music represents: Why is rock tearing through these stadiums; how is rap tearing up the club; how is pop tearing up the charts? I’m still figuring all that out, but the energy of rock is always going to be in my music; it might not be guitar-led, but the intensity and urgency of rock will be there.”

In an Apple Music interview with Zane Lowe, Thomas described his style as a fusion of rock, R&B and Boom bap production he designated as "Rock & Boom", a derivative sub-genre of all three. "...the sound that I'm crafting that's called Rock & Boom. It's R&B with the intensity of rock, it has R&B toplines. The boom of course for boom bap, it's the boom bap penmanship. It's also the boom because the 808s is gonna shake the world."

=== Visual style ===
Thomas directs all of his own videos, which are usually accompanied by promotional comedy skits and expansive promo campaigns, such as "Rid The Mid". He films most of his music videos and skits in front of a graffiti-covered garage in his home of Beaumont, Texas. The garage is continuously transformed based on the theming of the video; as Complex wrote, "In 'Rooting For You,' it’s the backdrop for a boyband of sports mascots. Meanwhile in 'Bad Enough', the garage is transformed into a football field complete with astroturf, bleachers, and a cheer squad."

=== Fashion style ===
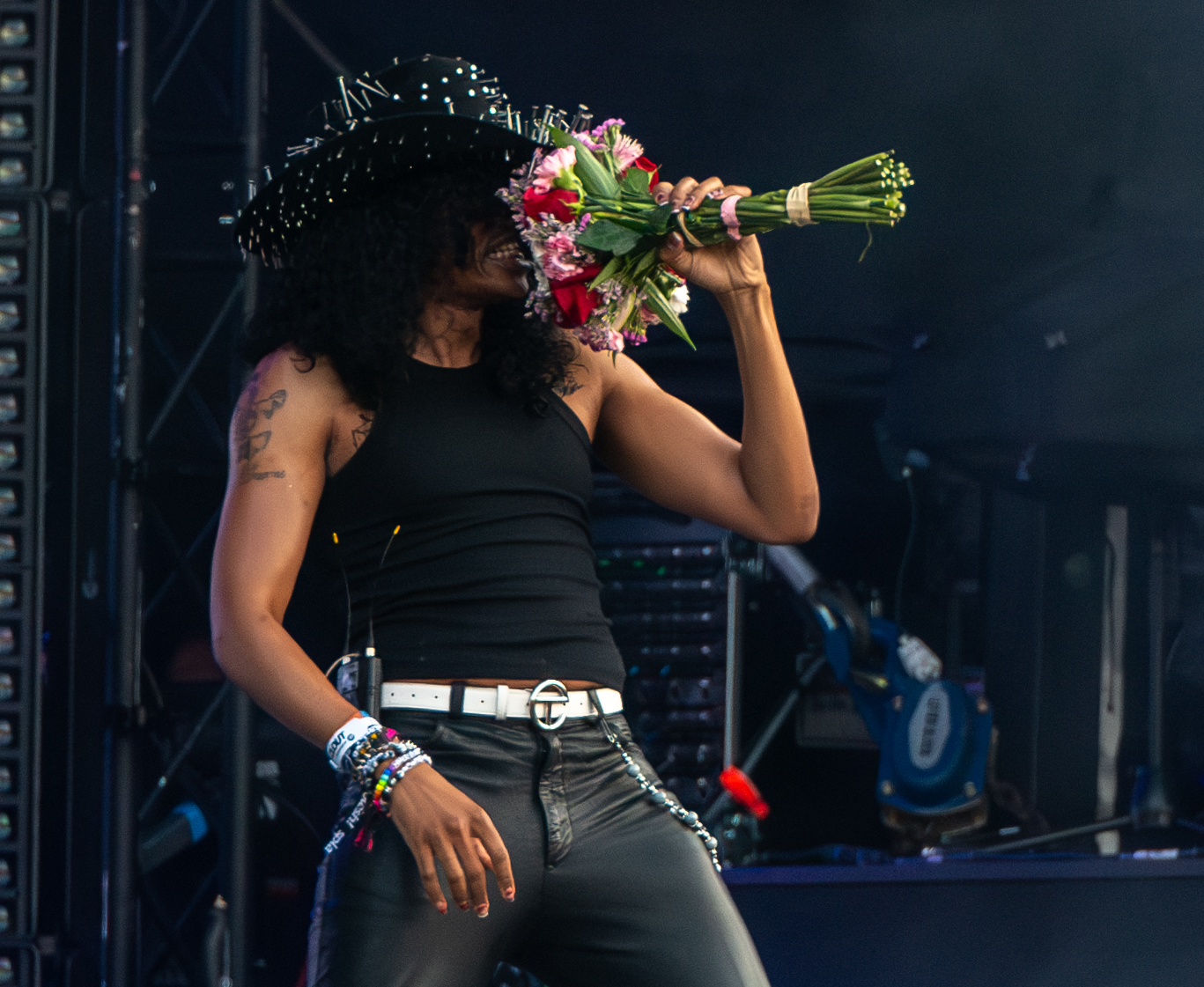
Teezo Touchdown at Clout Festival in 2024

Our Generation Music wrote that Thomas' image consists of, "nails in his hair, chain-linked necklaces, and eye-black fit for the football field". His managerial alter-ego, named Eugenius Hanes, wears a ginger wig and a cowboy hat. He is involved in high fashion, having previously modeled for Marc Jacobs, Balenciaga, Alyx, Moncler, and Telfar.

== Discography ==
=== Studio albums ===
Title	Album details
How Do You Sleep at Night?	Released: September 8, 2023; Labels: RCA • Not Fit for Society; Format: Digital download, streaming

=== Mixtapes ===
Title	Mixtape details
The Example	Released: 2018; Label: Self-released; Format: Digital download, streaming
Cover Boy	Released: 2018; Label: Self-released; Format: Digital download, streaming

=== Singles ===
Title	Year	Album(s)
"Slice"	2019	Non-album singles
"Strong Friend"	2020	Non-album singles
"Careful"	2020	Non-album singles
"Sucka" (featuring Fred Flippstone)	2020	Non-album singles
"Rooting for You"	2020	Non-album singles
"Bad Enough" (featuring Thomas Lopez)	2020	Non-album singles
"Social Cues"	2020	Non-album singles
"Technically"	2021	Non-album singles
"Mid"	2021	Non-album singles
"I'm Just a Fan"	2021	Non-album singles
"Handyman" (featuring Kenny Beats)	2022	Non-album singles
"Familiarity"	2023	How Do You Sleep at Night?
"5 O'Clock"	2023	Non-album singles
"Rock Paper Strippers"	2023	Non-album singles
"You Thought" (featuring Janelle Monáe)	2023	How Do You Sleep at Night?
"Making Flippy Floppy"	2024	Everyone's Getting Involved: A Tribute to Talking Heads' Stop Making Sense
"None of Your Business" (from Despicable Me 4)	2024	Non-album single
"Honeymoon Night"	2026	TBD

=== Charted songs ===
Title	Year	Peak chart positions										Certifications	Album
Title	Year	US	US R&B/HH	US Rap	AUS	CAN	FRA	NZ	SWE Heat.	UK	WW	Certifications	Album
"RunItUp" (Tyler, the Creator featuring Teezo Touchdown)	2021	68	32	—	92	70	—	—	—	—	77	RIAA: Gold	Call Me If You Get Lost
"The Ride" (Lil Yachty featuring Teezo Touchdown)	2023	— (Note: "The Ride" did not enter the Billboard Hot 100, but peaked at number 17 on the Bubbling Under Hot 100 Singles chart, which acts as an extension to the Hot 100.)	—	—	—	—	—	—	—	—	—		Let's Start Here
"Modern Jam" (Travis Scott featuring Teezo Touchdown)	2023	23	13	12	27	23	33	23	3	— (Note: "Modern Jam" did not enter the UK Singles Chart, as chart rules only allow three songs per artist to chart within the top one hundred at a time, but peaked at number 50 on the UK Streaming Chart.)	18	RIAA: Gold; MC: Gold	Utopia
"Amen" (Drake featuring Teezo Touchdown)	2023	15	11	9	24	17	80	32	8	— (Note: "Amen" did not enter the UK Singles Chart, as chart rules only allow three songs per artist to chart within the top one hundred at a time, but peaked at number 30 on the UK Streaming Chart.)	18		For All the Dogs
"Backstreets" (Don Toliver featuring Teezo Touchdown)	2024	—	49	—	—	—	—	—	—	—	—		Hardstone Psycho
"Darling, I" (Tyler, the Creator featuring Teezo Touchdown)	2024	15	4	4	24	29	—	19	—	24	24		Chromakopia
"—" denotes a recording that did not chart or was not released in that territory.

=== Guest appearances ===
List of guest appearances, with other performing artists, showing year released and album name
Title	Year	Other artist(s)	Album
"RunItUp"	2021	Tyler, the Creator	Call Me If You Get Lost
"Can't Get Over You"	2022	Westside Boogie, Smino	More Black Superheroes
"Messy"	2022	Rico Nasty, Bktherula	Las Ruinas
"Roses"	2022	See You Next Year	Pigeons & Planes & Big.Ass.Kids present: See You Next Year
"The Ride"	2023	Lil Yachty	Let's Start Here
"Luckily I'm Having"	2023	Don Toliver	Love Sick (Deluxe)
"Full English"	2023	Paris Texas	Mid Air
"Modern Jam"	2023	Travis Scott	Utopia
"Redlight"	2023	Between Friends	I Love My Girl, She's My Boy
"Amen"	2023	Drake	For All the Dogs
"7969 Santa"	2023	Drake	For All the Dogs
"First Night"	2024	Lyrical Lemonade, Juicy J, Cochise, Denzel Curry, Lil B	All Is Yellow
"Hummingbird"	2024	Lyrical Lemonade, Umi, SahBabii	All Is Yellow
"Backstreets"	2024	Don Toliver	Hardstone Psycho
"Chain Hang Low"	2024	Channel Tres	Head Rush
"Starving"	2024	Audrey Nuna	Trench
"Prized Possession"	2024	Latto	Sugar Honey Iced Tea
"Darling, I"	2024	Tyler, the Creator	Chromakopia
"The Last Time"	2025	Destin Conrad	Love On Digital
"Spelling Bee"	2025	Amelia Moore	He's Still Just Not That Into You!
"Prada Myself"	2025	Offset	Kiari
"What You Want"	2025	Cortis	Color Outside the Lines
"All the Signs"	2026	Don Toliver	Octane

== Concert tours ==
Headlining

- Spend The Night Tour (2024)

As Supporting Act

- Tyler, the Creator - Call Me If You Get Lost Tour (2022)
- Travis Scott - Circus Maximus Tour (2023)
- Don Toliver - Psycho Tour (2024)
