= Noid (Tyler, the Creator song) =

2024 single by Tyler, the Creator

Single by Tyler, the Creator

from the album Chromakopia
- Language: English; Chewa
- Released: October 21, 2024
- Genre: Rap rock; psychedelic soul
- Length: 4:44
- Label: Columbia
- Songwriters: Tyler Okonma; Paul Dobson Nyirongo
- Producers: Tyler, the Creator

Tyler, the Creator singles chronology
"Sorry Not Sorry" (2023)	"Noid" (2024)	"Sticky" (2024)

Music video
- "Noid" on YouTube

"Noid" is a 2024 song by American rapper and producer Tyler, the Creator, released as the lead single from his eighth studio album, Chromakopia. The song focuses on the paranoia (cf. "paranoid") experienced by Tyler as a figure in the public eye. It was released alongside a music video featuring American actress Ayo Edebiri.

The song samples "Nizakupanga Ngozi" by Zambian band Ngozi Family from their 1977 album 45,000 Volts. The song features background vocals by Willow Smith. The vocal sample features lead singer Paul Ngozi singing in his native Nyanja language about being respectful when visiting his home.

== Music video ==
The video depicts Okonma in his masked St. Chroma persona as he pushes through crowds of fans. A woman (played by actress Ayo Edebiri) runs towards him, mocking his old shock value-driven personality, such as that on earlier projects such as the albums Bastard and Goblin, by waving a gun in his face and screaming. Several more fans follow and confront Okonma, bearing unsettling grins while the rapper hurriedly tries to get away from them, clearly not wanting to associate with them. Throughout the video, Okonma hallucinates being robbed within his home, being tailed while driving, installing numerous locks on his doors and peeking through a curtain, terrified. It also often cuts to Okonma dancing in a room with flashing lights and shielding himself from them, likely to symbolize cameras. At the end of the video, Tyler roams around an empty lot with his shadow moving independently from him, before he falls to his knees screaming as the camera moves away from him. At this part of the video, the world is given color, in contrast to the monochrome filter previously over the video, which is also present in the music videos for "St. Chroma", "Sticky" and "Thought I Was Dead". Abundance of color is a common theme in Chromakopia.

The music video for "Noid" does not feature the full length of the track, most notably omitting the "paranoid, paranoid, paranoid" vocal intro and the final verses of the song.

== Charts ==
=== Weekly charts ===
Weekly chart performance for "Noid"
Chart (2024)	Peak position
Australia (ARIA)	13
Australia Hip Hop/R&B (ARIA)	1
Canada Hot 100 (Billboard)	22
Czech Republic Singles Digital (ČNS IFPI)	62
Global 200 (Billboard)	11
Ireland (IRMA)	12
Israel (Mako Hitlist)	81
Latvia Streaming (LaIPA)	3
Lithuania (AGATA)	7
Netherlands (Single Top 100)	50
New Zealand (Recorded Music NZ)	14
Poland (Polish Streaming Top 100)	38
Slovakia Singles Digital (ČNS IFPI)	47
South Africa (Billboard)	24
Sweden (Sverigetopplistan)	96
Switzerland (Schweizer Hitparade)	35
UK Singles (Official Charts)	16
UK Hip Hop/R&B (Official Charts)	3
US Billboard Hot 100	10
US Hot R&B/Hip-Hop Songs (Billboard)	2

=== Year-end charts ===
Year-end chart performance for "Noid"
Chart (2025)	Position
US Hot R&B/Hip-Hop Songs (Billboard)	76

== Certifications ==
Certifications for "Noid"
Region	Certification	Certified units/sales
Canada (Music Canada)	Gold	40,000^{‡}
United States (RIAA)	Platinum	1,000,000^{‡}
^{‡} Sales+streaming figures based on certification alone.
