= Darling, I =

2024 song by Tyler, the Creator featuring Teezo Touchdown

Song by Tyler, the Creator featuring Teezo Touchdown

from the album Chromakopia
- Released: October 28, 2024
- Genre: Hip-hop; R&B
- Length: 4:13
- Label: Columbia
- Songwriters: Tyler Okonma; Kamaal Fareed; Barry White; Aaron Thomas; Calvin Broadus; Pharrell Williams; Chad Hugo; John Guldberg; Tim Stahl
- Producers: Tyler, the Creator

Music video
- "Darling, I" on YouTube

"Darling, I" is a song by American rapper and producer Tyler, the Creator featuring fellow American rapper Teezo Touchdown from the former's eighth studio album, Chromakopia (2024). It contains samples of "Vivrant Thing (Violator Remix)" by Q-Tip featuring Missy Elliott and Busta Rhymes, and "Drop It Like It's Hot" by Snoop Dogg featuring Pharrell Williams.

== Composition and lyrics ==
"Darling, I" is a hip-hop and R&B song with rhythm inspired by The Neptunes and bouncy clicks in production. Lyrically, it focuses on Tyler, the Creator's attitude toward his relationships and their future. While still boasting about the uniqueness in each of his different luxury cars and romantic partners, he also ponders about having a nuclear family at one point ("I love this girl, though, I hit the gold mine / I'm thinkin' new crib, I'm thinkin' two kids") but feels as though he is not suited for monogamy, and laments the potential consequences of his preference for polyamory: "Until I get infatuated with a new bitch / But when that gray hair finally come, at least I felt somethin' if I ain't find the one / Nobody could fulfill me like this music shit does / So I'll be lonely with these Grammys when it's all said and done."

== Critical reception ==
Matt Mitchell of Paste stated the song "goes from sweet to braggadocious". Reviewing Chromakopia for NME, Fred Garratt-Stanley considered it a moment when Tyler, the Creator's "honesty is refreshing, and his lyrical dexterity gives these reflections humour and humanity". Alexis Petridis of The Guardian called the song "deceptively lovey-dovey" and commented it "manages to spin immaturity with convincing vulnerability." Alex Hudson of Exclaim! noted the song has "surprising sentimental softness". David Crone of AllMusic cited it as one of the tracks from the album which "sound a little like Flower Boy pastiches". Aron A. of HotNewHipHop praised the song for its "gorgeous vocal performance from Teezo Touchdown".

== Music video ==
The music video for the song was released on August 19, 2025, directed by Tyler himself, it features appearances by Teezo Touchdown who is also featured in the song, along with Lionel Boyce, Chase Infiniti, Na-Kel Smith, Nia Long, Ayo Edebiri, Willow Smith, Lauren London, Orione Strohhacker and Jasmine Rutledge. The music video features blurred out shoes, which is also featured in the Drop It Like It's Hot music video by Snoop Dogg and Pharrell Williams

== Charts ==
=== Weekly charts ===
Weekly chart performance for "Darling, I"
Chart (2024)	Peak position
Australia (ARIA)	24
Australia Hip Hop/R&B (ARIA)	3
Canada Hot 100 (Billboard)	29
Global 200 (Billboard)	24
Iceland (Tónlistinn)	40
Ireland (IRMA)	29
Latvia (LaIPA)	12
Lithuania (AGATA)	22
Netherlands (Single Top 100)	76
New Zealand (Recorded Music NZ)	19
South Africa (TOSAC)	41
Switzerland (Schweizer Hitparade)	88
UK Singles (OCC)	24
UK Hip Hop/R&B (OCC)	4
US Billboard Hot 100	15
US Hot R&B/Hip-Hop Songs (Billboard)	4

=== Year-end charts ===
Year-end chart performance for "Darling, I"
Chart (2025)	Position
US Hot R&B/Hip-Hop Songs (Billboard)	56

== Certifications ==
Certifications for "Darling, I"
Region	Certification	Certified units/sales
Canada (Music Canada)	Gold	40,000^{‡}
New Zealand (RMNZ)	Gold	15,000^{‡}
United States (RIAA)	Platinum	1,000,000^{‡}
^{‡} Sales+streaming figures based on certification alone.
