= List of songs recorded by Tyler, the Creator =

Songs by American rapper

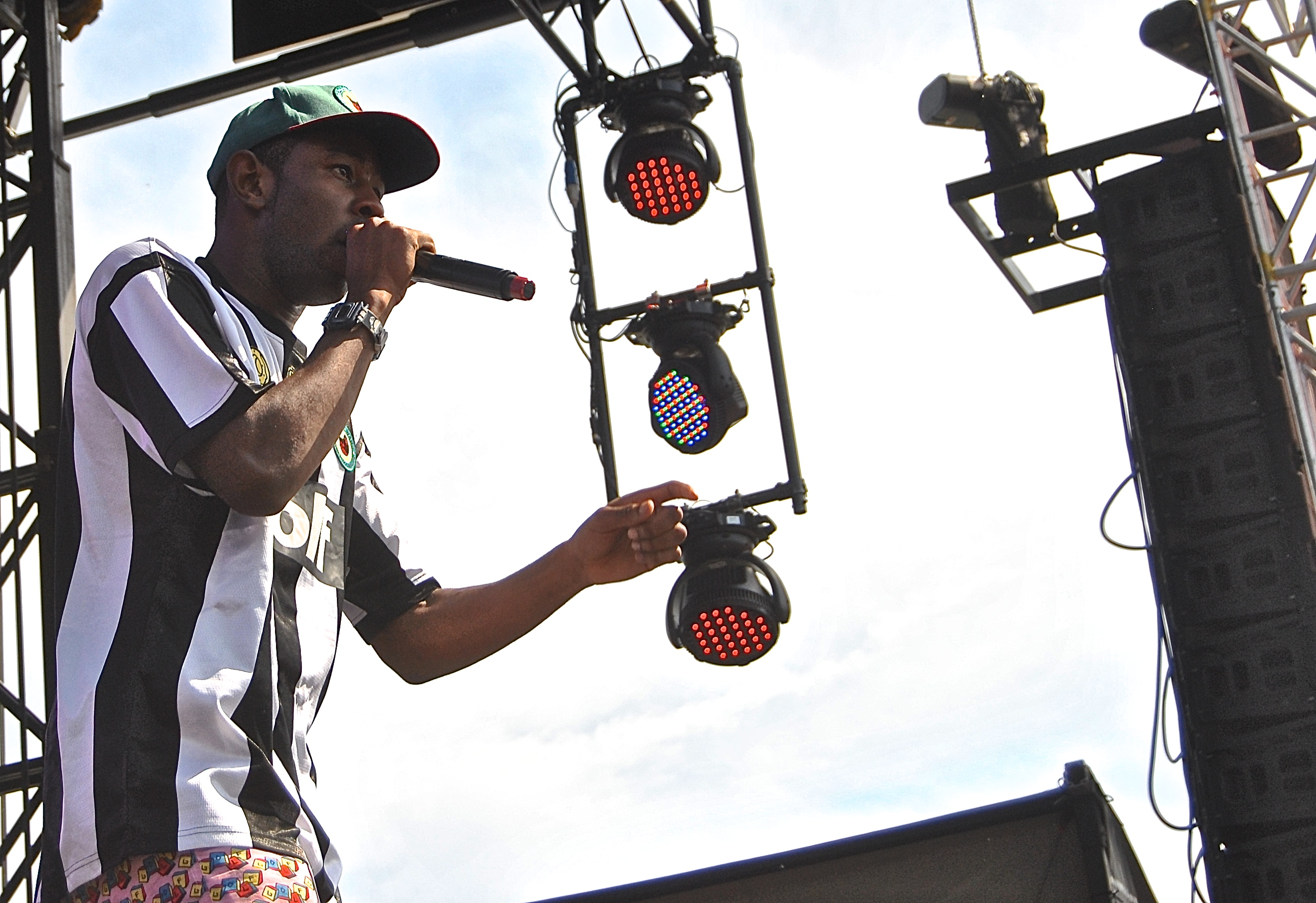
Tyler, the Creator performing at the 2016 Governors Ball Music Festival

This is a list of all songs recorded and officially released by American rapper and producer Tyler, the Creator.

== List ==
=== As lead artist ===
Key
†	Indicates single release

Song	Writer(s)	Original release	Producer(s)	Year	Ref.
"2Seater"	Tyler Okonma	Cherry Bomb	Tyler, the Creator	2015	
"435"†	Tyler Okonma; Mark Waterfield; Sarah Cracknell	—N/a	Tyler, the Creator	2018	
"48"	Tyler Okonma	Wolf	Tyler, the Creator	2013	
"911 / Mr. Lonely"†	Tyler Okonma; Christopher Breaux; Raymond Calhoun	Flower Boy	Tyler, the Creator	2017	
"A Boy Is a Gun"	Tyler Okonma; Bobby Dukes; Bobby Massey; Lester Allen McKenzie	Igor	Tyler, the Creator	2019	
"Are We Still Friends?"	Tyler Okonma; Al Green	Igor	Tyler, the Creator	2019	
"Analog"	Tyler Okonma; Gerard Long	Goblin	Tyler, the Creator	2011	
"Answer"	Tyler Okonma	Wolf	Tyler, the Creator	2013	
"Balloon"	Jaylah Hickmon; Luther Campbell; Harry Wayne Casey; Richard Finch; James Brown; Robert Ginyard	Chromakopia	Tyler, the Creator; Doechii	2024	
"Bastard"	Tyler Okonma	Bastard	Tyler, the Creator	2009	
"Best Interest"†	Tyler Okonma; Kenneth Chavis; Barbara Trotter	—N/a	Tyler, the Creator	2019	
"Big Poe"	Tyler Okonma; Pharrell Williams; Shye Ben Tzur; Jonathan Greenwood; Trevor Smith; Chad Hugo; Dominick Lamb; Sandy Linzer; Denny Randell; Mystikal; Kamaal Fareed; Malik Taylor; Ali Muhammad; Bryan Higgins; James Jackson; Bernard Edwards; Nile Rodgers	Don't Tap the Glass	Tyler, the Creator; Pharrell Williams	2025	
"Blessed"	Tyler Okonma	Call Me If You Get Lost	Tyler, the Creator	2021	
"Blow"	Tyler Okonma	Bastard	Tyler, the Creator	2009	
"Blow My Load"	Tyler Okonma	Cherry Bomb	Tyler, the Creator	2015	
"Boredom"†	Tyler Okonma	Flower Boy	Tyler, the Creator	2017	
"Boyfriend"	Tyler Okonma; John Charles Adler	Igor (Physical edition)	Tyler, the Creator	2019	
"Boyfriend, Girlfriend"	Tyler Okonma	Call Me If You Get Lost: The Estate Sale	Tyler, The Creator	2023	
"Bring It Back" (Note: Remix of Problem, Mike Will Made It and Drake's 2018 song "Bring It Back". Published exclusively via YouTube.)	Tyler Okonma; Jason Martin; Michael Williams II; Aubrey Graham	—N/a	Mike Will Made It	2018	
"Bronco" (Note: Remix of Drake and Lil Baby's song 2018 song Yes Indeed. Published exclusively via YouTube.)	Tyler Okonma; Aubrey Graham; Dominique Jones; Branden Brown; Wesley Glass	—N/a	BRackz; Wheezy	2018	
"Buffalo"	Tyler Okonma	Cherry Bomb	Tyler, the Creator	2015	
"Burger"	Tyler Okonma; Gerard Long	Goblin (Deluxe Edition)	Tyler, the Creator	2011	
"Cherry Bomb"	Tyler Okonma	Cherry Bomb	Tyler, the Creator	2015	
"Cindy Lou's Wish"	Tyler Okonma	Music Inspired by Illumination & Dr. Seuss' The Grinch	Tyler, the Creator	2018	
"Colossus"	Tyler Okonma	Wolf	Tyler, the Creator	2013	
"Corso"	Tyler Okonma	Call Me If You Get Lost	Tyler, the Creator	2021	
"Cowboy"	Tyler Okonma	Wolf	Tyler, the Creator	2013	
"Crust in Their Eyes" (Note: Remix of the 2018 Kids See Ghosts song featuring Yasiin Bey, also titled "Kids See Ghosts". Published exclusively via YouTube.)	Tyler Okonma; Kanye West; Scott Mescudi; Yasiin Bey; Andrew Dawson; Justin Vernon	—N/a	Kanye West; Kid Cudi; Plain Pat	2018	
"Darling, I"	Tyler Okonma; Kamaal Fareed; Barry White	Chromakopia	Tyler, the Creator; Teezo Touchdown	2024	
"Deathcamp"†	Tyler Okonma; Hermon Weems	Cherry Bomb	Tyler, the Creator	2015	
"Dogtooth"†	Tyler Okonma	Call Me If You Get Lost: The Estate Sale	Tyler, the Creator	2023	
"Domo23"†	Tyler Okonma	Wolf	Tyler, the Creator	2013	
"Don't Tap That Glass / Tweakin'"	Tyler Okonma; Todd Shaw; Tommy Wright III	Don't Tap the Glass	Tyler, the Creator	2025	
"Don't You Worry Baby"	Tyler Okonma; Madison McFerrin; Isiah Pinkney; Robert F. Gordon; Carlos Morgan	Don't Tap the Glass	Tyler, the Creator; Madison McFerrin	2025	
"Down Bad"	Tyler Okonma	Don't Tap the Glass (Physical edition/Test pressing)	Tyler, the Creator	2025	
"Droppin' Seeds"	Tyler Okonma; Dwayne Carter, Jr.	Flower Boy	Tyler, the Creator	2017	
"Earfquake"†	Tyler Okonma; Jordan Carter	Igor	Tyler, the Creator	2019	
"Enjoy Right Now, Today"	Tyler Okonma	Flower Boy	Tyler, the Creator	2017	
"Exactly What You Run from You End Up Chasing"	Tyler Okonma	Igor	Tyler, the Creator	2019	
"Find Your Wings"	Tyler Okonma	Cherry Bomb	Tyler, the Creator	2015	
"Fish/Boppin' Bitch"	Tyler Okonma; Christopher Breaux	Goblin	Tyler, the Creator	2011	
"Fishtail"	Tyler Okonma; Eliot Dubock; Thomas Paladino; Keisha Plum; Alvin Worthy	Call Me If You Get Lost (Physical edition)	Tyler, the Creator; Beat Butcha; Daringer	2021	
"Foreword"	Tyler Okonma; Alex O'Connor; Michael Karoli; Jaki Liebezeit; Irmin Schmidt; Holger Schuering; Damo Suzuki	Flower Boy	Tyler, the Creator	2017	
"French!"	Tyler Okonma; Gerard Long	Bastard	Tyler, the Creator	2009	
"Fucking Young / Perfect"†	Tyler Okonma; Kali Uchis	Cherry Bomb	Tyler, the Creator	2015	
"Fuck It"	Tyler Okonma	—N/a	Tyler, the Creator	2015	
"Garbage"	Tyler Okonma	The Music of Grand Theft Auto V, Volume 1: Original Music	Tyler, the Creator	2013	
"Garden Shed"	Tyler Okonma; Estelle Swaray	Flower Boy	Tyler, the Creator	2017	
"Gelato" (Note: Remix of Jacquees' 2018 song "No Validation". Published exclusively via YouTube.)	Tyler Okonma; Jacquees	—N/a	OG Parker; Xeryus	2018	
"Glitter"	Tyler Okonma	Flower Boy	Tyler, the Creator	2017	
"Goblin"	Tyler Okonma	Goblin	Tyler, the Creator	2011	
"Golden"	Tyler Okonma	Goblin	Tyler, the Creator	2011	
"Gone Gone / Thank You"	Tyler Okonma; Cullen Omori; Alan O'Day; Tatsuro Yamashita	Igor	Tyler, the Creator	2019	
"Group B"†	Tyler Okonma; Kenneth Chavis; Barbara Trotter	—N/a	Tyler, the Creator	2019	
"Her"	Tyler Okonma	Goblin	Tyler, the Creator	2011	
"Hey Jane"	Tyler Okonma	Chromakopia	Tyler, the Creator	2024	
"Hot Chocolate"	Tyler Okonma; Larry Mizell; Jerry Paper	Music Inspired by Illumination & Dr. Seuss' The Grinch	Tyler, the Creator	2018	
"Hot Wind Blows"	Tyler Okonma; Dwayne Michael Carter, Jr.	Call Me If You Get Lost	Tyler, the Creator	2021	
"I'll Take Care of You"	Tyler Okonma; Abigail Smith; Brittany Carpentero; Chris Henderson; Jarques Usher; Jonathan Lewis; Alphonse Smith; Venetia Lewis	Don't Tap the Glass	Tyler, the Creator; Yebba	2025	
"I Ain't Got Time"†	Tyler Okonma	Flower Boy	Tyler, the Creator	2017	
"I Am the Grinch"	Tyler Okonma	Music Inspired by Illumination & Dr. Seuss' The Grinch	Tyler, the Creator	2018	
"I Don't Love You Anymore"	Tyler Okonma	Igor	Tyler, the Creator	2019	
"IFHY"	Tyler Okonma; Pharrell Williams	Wolf	Tyler, the Creator	2013	
"Igor's Theme"	Tyler Okonma; Symere Woods	Igor	Tyler, the Creator	2019	
"I Killed You"	Tyler Okonma	Chromakopia	Tyler, the Creator	2024	
"Inglorious"	Tyler Okonma	Bastard	Tyler, the Creator	2009	
"I Hope You Find Your Way Home"	Tyler Okonma	Chromakopia	Tyler, the Creator	2024	
"I Think"	Tyler Okonma; Bodiono Nkono Télesphore; Bibi Mascel	Igor	Tyler, the Creator	2019	
"Jack and the Beanstalk"	Tyler Okonma	Bastard	Tyler, the Creator	2009	
"Jamba"	Tyler Okonma; Gerard Long	Wolf	Tyler, the Creator	2013	
"Judge Judy"	Tyler Okonma	Chromakopia	Tyler, the Creator	2024	
"Juggernaut"	Tyler Okonma	Call Me If You Get Lost	Tyler, the Creator	2021	
"Keep da O's"	Tyler Okonma; Pharrell Williams; Al Dubin; Harry Warren	Cherry Bomb	Tyler, the Creator	2015	
"Lemonhead"	Tyler Okonma; Dion Hayes	Call Me If You Get Lost	Tyler, the Creator	2021	
"Lights On"	Tyler Okonma; Santi White; Ryan Beatty	Music Inspired by Illumination & Dr. Seuss' The Grinch	Tyler, the Creator	2018	
"Like Him"†	Tyler Okonma	Chromakopia	Tyler, the Creator; Lola Young	2024	
"Lone"	Tyler Okonma	Wolf	Tyler, the Creator	2013	
"Lumberjack"†	Tyler Okonma; Larry Willis; Robert Diggs; Anthony Ian Berkeley; Arnold Hamilton; Paul Huston	Call Me If You Get Lost	Tyler, the Creator	2021	
"Manifesto"	Tyler Okonma	Call Me If You Get Lost	Tyler, the Creator	2021	
"Massa"	Tyler Okonma	Call Me If You Get Lost	Tyler, the Creator	2021	
"Mommanem"	Tyler Okonma; Tommi Eckhart; Nicholas Deinheart	Don't Tap the Glass	Tyler, the Creator	2025	
"Momma Talk"	Tyler Okonma	Call Me If You Get Lost	Tyler, the Creator	2021	
"Mother"	Tyler Okonma	Chromakopia (Physical edition/Test pressing)	Tyler, the Creator	2024	
"New Magic Wand"	Tyler Okonma	Igor	Tyler, the Creator	2019	
"Nightmare"	Tyler Okonma	Goblin	Tyler, the Creator	2011	
"Noid"†	Tyler Okonma	Chromakopia	Tyler, the Creator	2024	
"November"	Tyler Okonma	Flower Boy	Tyler, the Creator	2017	
"Oblivion"	Tyler Okonma	Radical	James Pants	2010	
"Odd Toddlers"	Tyler Okonma; Casey Jones	Bastard	Tyler, the Creator	2009	
"Okaga, CA"	Tyler Okonma; Clementine Creevy	Cherry Bomb	Tyler, the Creator	2015	
"Okra"†	Tyler Okonma	—N/a	Tyler, the Creator	2018	
"Orange Juice" (with Earl Sweatshirt as EarlWolf)	Tyler Okonma; Thebe Kgositsile	Radical	Tyler, the Creator	2010	
"Parade"	Tyler Okonma; Anuedy Anderson	Bastard	Tyler, the Creator	2009	
"Parking Lot"	Tyler Okonma; Casey Jones; Michael Griffin II	Wolf	Tyler, the Creator	2013	
"PartyIsntOver/ Campfire/Bimmer"	Tyler Okonma; Paul Francis Webster; Christopher Breaux; Lætitia Sadier	Wolf	Tyler, the Creator	2013	
"Pigs"	Tyler Okonma	Wolf	Tyler, the Creator	2013	
"Pigs Fly"	Tyler Okonma; Dominique Cole	Bastard	Tyler, the Creator	2009	
"Parking Lot"	Tyler Okonma; Casey Jones; Michael Griffin II	Wolf	Tyler, the Creator	2013	
"Peach Fuzz"†	Tyler Okonma	—N/a	Tyler, the Creator	2018	
"Pilot"	Tyler Okonma	Cherry Bomb	Tyler, the Creator	2015	
"Potato Salad"† (with A$AP Rocky)	Tyler Okonma; Rakim Myers; Missy Elliott; Monica; Lee Hatim; Craig Brockman	—N/a	Kanye West; Missy Elliott	2018	
"Pothole"	Tyler Okonma; Roy Ayers	Flower Boy	Tyler, the Creator	2017	
"Puppet"	Tyler Okonma; Kanye West; Mick Ware; David Smith	Igor	Tyler, the Creator	2019	
"Radicals"	Tyler Okonma	Goblin	Tyler, the Creator	2011	
"Rah Tah Tah"	Tyler Okonma	Chromakopia	Tyler, the Creator	2024	
"Ring Ring Ring"†	Tyler Okonma; Ray Parker, Jr.	Don't Tap the Glass	Tyler, the Creator	2025	
"Rise!"	Tyler Okonma	Call Me If You Get Lost	Tyler, the Creator; Jamie xx	2021	
"Run"	Tyler Okonma	Cherry Bomb	Tyler, the Creator	2015	
"RunItUp"	Tyler Okonma	Call Me If You Get Lost	Tyler, the Creator	2021	
"Running Out of Time"	Tyler Okonma	Igor	Tyler, the Creator	2019	
"Rusty"	Tyler Okonma; Dominique Mole; Thebe Kgositsile	Wolf	Tyler, the Creator	2013	
"Safari"	Tyler Okonma	Call Me If You Get Lost	Tyler, the Creator; Jay Versace	2021	
“Sag Harbor"	Tyler Okonma	Non-Album Single	Tyler, the Creator	2025	
"Sandwitches"†	Tyler Okonma; Gerard Long	Goblin	Tyler, the Creator	2010	
"Sarah"	Tyler Okonma	Bastard	Tyler, the Creator	2009	
"See You Again"†	Tyler Okonma	Flower Boy	Tyler, the Creator	2017	
"Session"	Tyler Okonma; Gerard Long; Michael Griffin II; Brandun DeShay	Bastard	Tyler, the Creator	2009	
"Seven"	Tyler Okonma	Bastard	Tyler, the Creator	2009	
"She"†	Tyler Okonma; Christopher Breaux	Goblin	Tyler, the Creator	2011	
"Sir Baudelaire"	Tyler Okonma	Call Me If You Get Lost	Tyler, the Creator	2021	
"Slater"	Tyler Okonma	Wolf	Tyler, the Creator	2013	
"Slow It Down"	Tyler Okonma; Gerard Long	Bastard	Tyler, the Creator	2009	
"Smuckers"	Tyler Okonma; Wayne Carter; Kanye West; Gabriele Ducros	Cherry Bomb	Tyler, the Creator	2015	
"Sometimes..."	Tyler Okonma	Flower Boy	Tyler, the Creator	2017	
"St. Chroma"	Tyler Okonma; Ashton Simmonds	Chromakopia	Tyler, the Creator; Daniel Caesar	2024	
"Steak Sauce"	Tyler Okonma	Goblin (Deluxe Edition)	Tyler, the Creator	2011	
"Sticky"†	Tyler Okonma; Gloria Woods; Dwayne Carter, Jr.; Janae Wherry; Deanna Brown; Deidre Brown; Yamma Brown; David Brown; Timothy Clayton; Jamal Jones; Zachary Wallace; Elvis Williams; Rex Zamor; Timothy Mosley; Aaron Bolton; Dudley Duverne; Zachary Anson Wallace	Chromakopia	Tyler, the Creator; GloRilla; Sexyy Red; Lil Wayne	2024	
"Stop Playing with Me"	Tyler Okonma	Don't Tap the Glass	Tyler, the Creator	2025	
"Sucka Free"	Tyler Okonma	Don't Tap the Glass	Tyler, the Creator	2025	
"Sugar on My Tongue"	Tyler Okonma	Don't Tap the Glass	Tyler, the Creator	2025	
"Sweet / I Thought You Wanted to Dance"	Tyler Okonma	Call Me If You Get Lost	Tyler, the Creator	2021	
"Take Your Mask Off"	Tyler Okonma; Kathryn Thomas; Gregory Cook	Chromakopia	Tyler, the Creator; Daniel Caesar; LaToiya Williams	2024	
"Tamale"	Tyler Okonma	Wolf	Tyler, the Creator	2013	
"Tell Me How"†	Tyler Okonma	—N/a	Tyler, the Creator	2021	
"Tell Me What It Is"	Tyler Okonma	Don't Tap the Glass	Tyler, the Creator	2025	
"The Brown Stains of Darkeese Latifah Part 6-12 (Remix)"	Tyler Okonma; Quincy Hanley	Cherry Bomb	Tyler, the Creator	2015	
"That Guy"	Tyler Okonma	Non-Album Single	Tyler, the Creator	2024	
"Thought I Was Dead"	Tyler Okonma	Chromakopia	Tyler, the Creator; ScHoolboy Q; Santigold	2024	
"Tina"	Tyler Okonma; Travis Bennett; Davon Wilson	Bastard	Tyler, the Creator	2009	
"TIPTOE"	Tyler Okonma	Non-Album Single	Tyler, the Creator	2018	
"Tomorrow"	Tyler Okonma; Ashton Simmonds	Chromakopia	Tyler, the Creator	2024	
"Transylvania"	Tyler Okonma; Vyron Turner	Goblin	Left Brain	2011	
"Trashwang"	Tyler Okonma; Lee Spielman; Na'kel Smith; Vyron Turner; Lionel Boyce; Lucas Vercetti; Davon Wilson	Wolf	Tyler, the Creator	2013	
"Treehome95"	Tyler Okonma; Erykah Badu	Wolf	Tyler, the Creator	2013	
"Tron Cat"	Tyler Okonma	Goblin	Tyler, the Creator	2011	
"Untitled63"	Tyler Okonma	Goblin (Deluxe Edition)	Tyler, the Creator	2011	
"VCR / Wheels"	Tyler Okonma	Bastard	Tyler, the Creator	2009	
"What's Good"	Tyler Okonma	Igor	Tyler, the Creator	2019	
"What the Fuck Right Now" (with A$AP Rocky)	Tyler Okonma	—N/a	Kanye West	2016	
"When Gloves Come Off"	Tyler Okonma	Music Inspired by Illumination & Dr. Seuss' The Grinch	Tyler, the Creator	2018	
"Where This Flower Blooms"	Tyler Okonma; Christopher Breaux	Flower Boy	Tyler, the Creator	2017	
"Who Dat Boy"†	Tyler Okonma; Rakim Myers	Flower Boy	Tyler, the Creator	2017	
"Whoville"	Tyler Okonma	Music Inspired by Illumination & Dr. Seuss' The Grinch	Tyler, the Creator	2018	
"Wilshire"	Tyler Okonma	Call Me If You Get Lost	Tyler, the Creator	2021	
"Window"	Tyler Okonma; Dominique Cole; Christopher Breaux; Gerard Long; Michael Griffin II	Goblin	Tyler, the Creator	2011	
"WusYaName"	Tyler Okonma	Call Me If You Get Lost	Tyler, the Creator	2021	
"Yellow"	Tyler Okonma	Cherry Bomb (Physical edition)	Tyler, the Creator	2015	
"Yonkers"†	Tyler Okonma	Goblin	Tyler, the Creator	2011	
"You're a Mean One, Mr. Grinch"	Tyler Okonma	Music Inspired by Illumination & Dr. Seuss' The Grinch	Tyler, the Creator	2018	
"Ziploc" (Note: Remix of Jay-Z's 2017 song "4:44". Published exclusively via YouTube.)	Tyler Okonma; Shawn Carter; Dion Wilson; Kanan Keeney	—N/a	No I.D.	2017	

=== As featured artist ===
Key
†	Indicates single release

Name of song, writer(s), original release, producer(s), and year of release
Song	Artist(s)	Writer(s)	Original release	Producer(s)	Year	Ref.
"After the Storm"†	Kali Uchis featuring Tyler, the Creator and Bootsy Collins	Kali Uchis; Matthew Tavares; Chester Hansen; Alexander Sowinski; Leland Whitty; William Earl "Bootsy" Collins; Tyler Okonma	Isolation	BadBadNotGood	2018	
"Baby Breath"	Quavo featuring Pharrell Williams, Tyler, the Creator, and ASAP Rocky	Quavious Marshall; Pharrell Williams; Tyler Okonma; Rakim Mayers	Qrömelife	Pharrell Williams	2026	
"Big Persona"†	Maxo Kream featuring Tyler, the Creator	Emekwanem Ogugua Biosah Jr.; Tyler Okonma	Weight of the World	Tyler, the Creator	2021	
"Biking"†	Frank Ocean featuring Jay-Z and Tyler, the Creator	Christopher Breaux; Shawn Carter; Tyler Okonma; Adam Feeney; Jacob Ludwig Olofsson; Rami Dawood	—N/a	Frank Dukes; Jarami	2017	
"Cash In Cash Out"†	Pharrell Williams featuring 21 Savage and Tyler, the Creator	Pharrell Williams; Shéyaa Bin Abraham-Joseph; Tyler Okonma	—N/a	Pharrell Williams	2022	
"Castaway"	Yuna featuring Tyler, the Creator	Carlo Pes; Robin Hannibal; Yunalis Zara'ai; Chloe Angelides; Tyler Okonma	Rouge	Robin Hannibal; Rex Rideout; Rob Cohen; Snipe Young	2019	
"Cracc Era"	Maxo Kream featuring Tyler, the Creator	Emekwanem Biosah II; Tyler Okonma	Personification	Tyler, the Creator	2024	
"DTA"	Casey Veggies featuring Tyler, the Creator	Casey Jones; Tyler Okonma	Sleeping in Class	Tyler, the Creator	2010	
"End / Golden Girl"	Frank Ocean featuring Tyler, the Creator	Christopher Breaux; Tyler Okonma; James Ho; Pharrell Williams	Channel Orange (CD edition)	Frank Ocean; Malay; Pharrell Williams	2012	
"Fuego"†	Channel Tres featuring Tyler, the Creator	Sheldon Young; Tyler Okonma; Gabriel Stevenson; Nick Sylvester	I Can't Go Outside	Channel Tres; Like; Nick Sylvester	2020	
"Go (Gas)"†	Domo Genesis featuring Wiz Khalifa, Juicy J, and Tyler, the Creator	Dominique Cole; Tyler Okonma; Jordan Houston; Cameron Thomaz	Genesis	Tyler, the Creator	2016	
"Gravity"†	Brent Faiyaz and DJ Dahi featuring Tyler, the Creator	Steve Lacy-Moya; Tyler Okonma; Dacoury Natche; Christopher Wood	Make It Out Alive	DJ Dahi	2021	
"Here We Go... Again"	The Weeknd featuring Tyler, The Creator	Abel Tesfaye · Tyler Okonma · Masamune Kudo · Bruce Johnston · Brian Kennedy · Benny Bock · Charlie Coffeen · Christian Love	Dawn FM	The Weeknd · Rex Kudo · Bruce Johnston · Brian Kennedy · Benny Bock · Charlie Coffeen · Christian Love	2022	
"I'm a Hater"	Waka Flocka Flame featuring Derez De'Shon and Tyler, the Creator	Lex Luger; Southside; TM88; Derez De'Shon; Tyler Okonma; Juaquin Malphurs	Salute Me or Shoot Me 4 (Banned from America)	Lex Luger; Southside; TM88	2012	
"Legendary"	DJ Drama featuring Tyler, the Creator	Tyree Simmons; Tyler Okonma; Don Cannon; UNKWN; Sammy Haig	I'm Really Like That	UNKWN; Sammy Haig; Don Cannon	2023	
"No Idols"	Domo Genesis & The Alchemist featuring Tyler, the Creator	Dominique Cole; Alan Maman; Tyler Okonma	No Idols	The Alchemist	2012	
"Odd Octubree"	brandUn DeShay featuring Tyler, the Creator and Casey Veggies	Tyler Okonma; Daniel Dumile; Casey Jones; Brandun DeShay	Volume: One! For The Money	Tyler, the Creator; Madlib	2008	
"Open a Window"†	Rex Orange County featuring Tyler, the Creator	Alex O'Connor; Benny Sings; Tyler Okonma	Who Cares?	Rex Orange County; Benny Sings; Tyler, the Creator	2022	
"RIP"	Casey Veggies featuring Tyler, the Creator	Tyler Okonma; Casey Jones	Live & Grow	Tyler, the Creator	2015	
"Summa Luv"†	JHawk Productionsfeaturing Hodgy Beats and Tyler, The Creator	Jeremy Hawkins · Gerard Long · Tyler Okonma	—N/a	JHawk Productions	2008	
"T.D"	Lil Yachty & Tierra Whack featuring Tyler, the Creator and ASAP Rocky	30 Roc; Miles McCollum; Pharrell Williams; Rakim Meyers; Tierra Whack; Tyler Okonma	Lil Boat 3	Lil Yachty	2020	
"Telephone Calls"	ASAP Mob featuring ASAP Rocky, Tyler, the Creator, Playboi Carti, and Yung Gleesh	Rakim Mayers; Malcolm Lawson-Stribling; Tyler Okonma; Jordan Carter; Asa Asuncion; Antonio Marangolo; Massimo Morante; Fabio Pignatelli; Claudio Simonetti; Yung Gleesh; Plu2o Nash	Cozy Tapes Vol. 1: Friends	Plu2o Nash; Hector Delgado	2016	
"Trouble on My Mind"†	Pusha T featuring Tyler, the Creator	Terrence Thornton; Tyler Okonma; Pharrell Williams; Chad Hugo; Vyron Turner	Fear of God II: Let Us Pray	The Neptunes; Left Brain	2011	
"U Say"	GoldLink featuring Tyler, the Creator and Jay Prince	Julian Nicco-Annan; Tyler Okonma; Jazon Kawu-Eugenio; D'Anthony Carlos	Diaspora	Juls	2019	
"Virginia Boy (Remix)"	Pharrell Williams featuring Tyler, the Creator	Pharrell Williams; Tyler Okonma	Piece by Piece (Music from the Motion Picture)	Pharrell Williams	2024	
"What's So Fxckin Funny?"	brandUn DeShay	Brandun Deshay · Tyler Okonma	Volume: Two! for the Show	Brandun DeShay · Tyler, the Creator	2009	
"Whoa"†	Earl Sweatshirt featuring Tyler, the Creator	Thebe Kgositsile; Tyler Okonma	Doris	Tyler, the Creator	2013	
