= Tyler, the Creator discography =

Discography of American rapper Tyler, the Creator

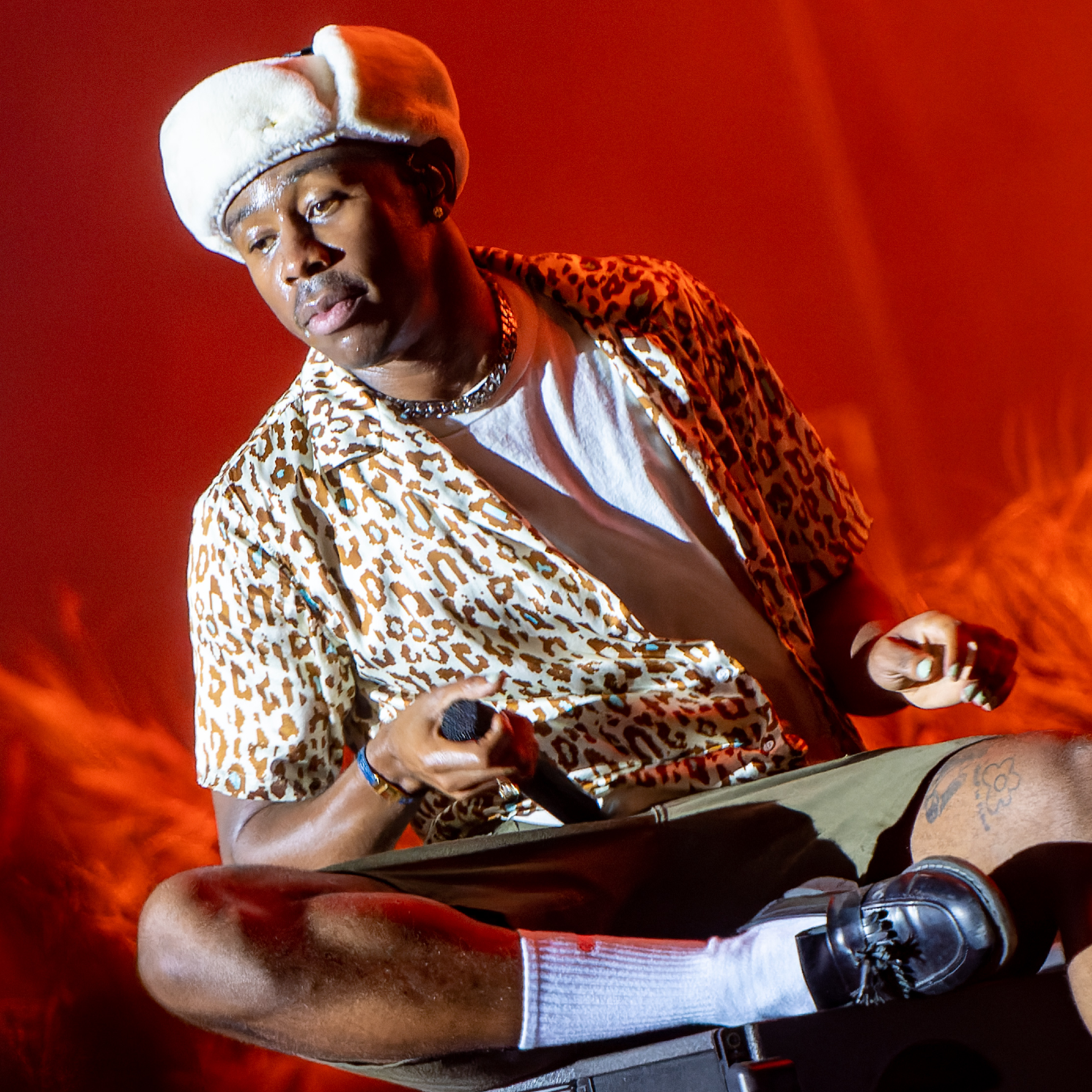
- Tyler, the Creator performing at the Primavera Sound 2022
- Studio albums: 9
- Extended plays: 1
- Singles: 45
- Music videos: 57

American rapper and producer Tyler, the Creator has released nine studio albums, one extended play (EP), 45 singles (including 13 as featured artist), two instrumental albums, one live album, and one video album.

Tyler's first album, Bastard, was self-released free of charge, on Christmas 2009. His second album, Goblin, was released in 2011, supported by the singles "Sandwitches", "Yonkers", which became popular on YouTube and helped him rise to prominence, and "She", featuring Frank Ocean. Goblin debuted at number five on the Billboard 200 and received positive reviews which praised its horrorcore style. In 2012, His music collective released their debut album, and he appeared on the songs "Oldie" and "Rella". In 2013, Tyler released his third album, Wolf, which sold 90,000 copies in its first week and debuted at number three on the Billboard 200. It was supported by the single "Domo23" and received positive reviews from music critics, who complimented its diverse production. In April 2015, he released his fourth studio album, Cherry Bomb, which debuted at number four on the Billboard 200 and at number one on both of the Top R&B/Hip-Hop Albums and Top Rap Albums charts. The album included features from Kanye West, Lil Wayne, and others.

On July 21, 2017, Tyler released his fifth studio album, Flower Boy, which included features from Frank Ocean, ASAP Rocky, Lil Wayne, and more. His sixth studio album, Igor, was released on May 17, 2019, and has features from Kanye West, Lil Uzi Vert, Playboi Carti, and others. Igor debuted at number one on the Billboard 200, becoming his first album to do so. His seventh studio album, Call Me If You Get Lost, was released on June 25, 2021. Both Igor and Call Me If You Get Lost, in 2020 and 2022 respectively, won the Grammy Award for Best Rap Album. These wins marked Tyler's first and second Grammy wins. A deluxe version of Call Me If You Get Lost, subtitled The Estate Sale, was released on March 31, 2023. It featured eight bonus tracks and included features from Vince Staples, ASAP Rocky, and YG. It was promoted by three music videos for the tracks "Dogtooth", "Sorry Not Sorry", and "Wharf Talk", which were released to YouTube on March 27, 29, and the 31, respectively.

On October 28, 2024, Tyler released his eighth album, Chromakopia, with features from artists including Daniel Caesar, Doechii, and GloRilla. There is an additional feature by Playboi Carti on the track "Thought I Was Dead", which only appears on physical releases of the album Chromakopia was released on October 28, 2024, and became Tyler, the Creator's third album to reach number one on the Billboard 200. The album was supported by singles including "Noid", "Sticky", and "Like Him"."Tyler, the Creator's 'CHROMAKOPIA' Debuts at No. 1 on Billboard 200". Billboard Canada. November 5, 2024."Tyler, the Creator Releases New Album CHROMAKOPIA Out Now Via Columbia Records". Sony Music Canada. October 29, 2024. Nine months later, on July 21, 2025, Tyler released his ninth album Don't Tap the Glass, with features from artists such as Pharrell Williams (credited as Sk8brd), Madison McFerrin, and Yebba.

== Albums ==
=== Studio albums ===
List of studio albums, with selected chart positions, sales figures and certifications
Title	Album details	Peak chart positions										Sales	Certifications
Title	Album details	US	AUS	CAN	DEN	FRA	IRE	NZ	NOR	SWE	UK	Sales	Certifications
Bastard	Released: December 25, 2009; Label: Self-released; Format: Digital download	—	—	—	—	—	—	—	—	—	—		
Goblin	Released: May 10, 2011; Label: XL; Format: CD, LP, digital download	5	66	16	13	—	44	—	12	—	21	US: 45,000	RIAA: Platinum; BPI: Silver; MC: Gold; RMNZ: Gold
Wolf	Released: April 2, 2013; Label: Odd Future; Format: CD, LP, digital download, streaming	3	19	2	10	116	46	30	15	—	17	US: 107,000	RIAA: Platinum; BPI: Gold; RMNZ: Gold
Cherry Bomb	Released: April 13, 2015; Label: Odd Future; Format: CD, LP, digital download	4	10	5	3	195	22	23	35	—	16	US: 58,000	RIAA: Gold; BPI: Silver
Flower Boy	Released: July 21, 2017; Label: Columbia; Format: CD, LP, digital download, cassette	2	8	2	11	65	7	6	12	20	9	US: 70,000	RIAA: 2× Platinum; ARIA: Gold; BPI: Gold; GLF: Gold; IFPI DEN: Platinum; IFPI NOR: Platinum; MC: Platinum; RMNZ: 2× Platinum; SNEP: Gold
Igor	Released: May 17, 2019; Label: Columbia; Format: CD, LP, digital download, cassette	1	3	2	4	43	4	2	3	5	4	US: 74,000	RIAA: 2× Platinum; ARIA: Platinum; BPI: Platinum; IFPI DEN: Platinum; IFPI NOR: 2× Platinum; MC: Platinum; RMNZ: 2× Platinum; SNEP: Platinum
Call Me If You Get Lost	Released: June 25, 2021; Label: Columbia; Format: CD, LP, digital download, cassette	1	2	3	3	32	3	2	4	10	4	US: 55,000	RIAA: 2× Platinum; BPI: Gold; IFPI DEN: Gold; IFPI NOR: Gold; MC: Gold; RMNZ: Platinum; SNEP: Gold
Chromakopia	Released: October 28, 2024; Label: Columbia; Format: CD, LP, digital download, cassette	1	1	1	4	19	1	1	2	3	1	US: 142,000	RIAA: Platinum; BPI: Gold; IFPI DEN: Gold; MC: Platinum; RMNZ: Platinum; SNEP: Gold
Don't Tap the Glass	Released: July 21, 2025; Label: Columbia; Format: CD, LP, digital download, cassette	1	4	6	10	33	2	4	15	6	2	US: 128,000	RIAA: Gold
"—" denotes a recording that did not chart or was not released in that territory.

=== Video albums ===
List of video albums, with selected details
Title	Album details
Apple Music Presents: Tyler, the Creator	Released: August 13, 2019; Format: Streaming

=== Instrumental albums ===
List of instrumental albums, with selected chart positions
Title	Album details	Peak chart positions
Title	Album details	US Sales
Cherry Bomb Instrumentals	Released: October 12, 2018; Format: Digital download, LP, streaming	31
Wolf Instrumentals	Released: April 7, 2023; Format: Digital download, LP, streaming	—

=== Live albums ===
List of live albums, with selected details
Title	Album details
Live at Splash!	Released: September 3, 2013; Label: Creative Concerts; Format: Digital download, streaming

== EPs ==
List of extended plays, with selected chart positions
Title	Album details	Peak chart positions
Title	Album details	US Holiday
Music Inspired by Illumination & Dr. Seuss' The Grinch	Released: November 16, 2018; Label: Columbia; Format: Digital download, streaming	34

== Singles ==
=== As lead artist ===
List of singles as lead artist, with selected chart positions, showing year released and album name
Title	Year	Peak chart positions										Certifications	Album
Title	Year	US	AUS	CAN	DEN	FRA	IRE	NZ	SWE	UK	WW	Certifications	Album
"Sandwitches" (featuring Hodgy Beats)	2011	—	—	—	—	—	—	—	—	—	—		Goblin
"Yonkers"	2011	— (Note: "Yonkers" did not enter the Billboard Hot 100, but it peaked at number two on the Bubbling Under Hot 100 chart.)	—	—	—	—	—	—	—	—	—	RIAA: Platinum; BPI: Silver; MC: Platinum; RMNZ: Platinum	Goblin
"She" (featuring Frank Ocean)	2011	—	—	—	—	—	—	—	—	—	—	RIAA: 4× Platinum; BPI: Silver; MC: Platinum; RMNZ: Platinum	Goblin
"Domo23"	2013	— (Note: "Domo23" did not enter the Billboard Hot 100, but it peaked at number two on the Bubbling Under Hot 100 Singles chart.)	—	94	—	—	—	—	—	—	—	RIAA: Gold	Wolf
"Deathcamp"	2015	—	—	—	—	—	—	—	—	—	—		Cherry Bomb
"Fucking Young / Perfect"	2015	—	—	—	—	—	—	—	—	—	—	RIAA: Gold; RMNZ: Gold	Cherry Bomb
"Who Dat Boy" (featuring ASAP Rocky)	2017	87	92	60	—	—	—	— (Note: "Who Dat Boy" did not enter the NZ Top 40 Singles Chart, but it peaked at number 2 on the NZ Heatseeker Singles Chart.)	—	93	—	RIAA: 2× Platinum; ARIA: Gold; BPI: Silver; MC: Platinum; RMNZ: Platinum	Flower Boy
"911 / Mr. Lonely"	2017	— (Note: "911 / Mr. Lonely" did not enter the Billboard Hot 100, but it peaked at number one on the Bubbling Under Hot 100 Singles chart.)	—	—	—	—	—	— (Note: "911 / Mr. Lonely" did not enter the NZ Top 40 Singles Chart, but it peaked at number 3 on the NZ Heatseeker Singles Chart.)	—	—	—	RIAA: 2× Platinum; ARIA: Gold; BPI: Silver; MC: Gold; RMNZ: Platinum	Flower Boy
"Boredom" (featuring Rex Orange County and Anna of the North)	2017	—	—	—	—	—	—	— (Note: "Boredom" did not enter the NZ Top 40 Singles Chart, but it peaked at number 10 on the NZ Heatseeker Singles Chart.)	—	—	—	RIAA: Platinum; BPI: Silver; MC: Gold; RMNZ: Platinum	Flower Boy
"I Ain't Got Time!"	2017	—	—	—	—	—	—	— (Note: "I Ain't Got Time!" did not enter the NZ Top 40 Singles Chart, but it peaked at number 2 on the NZ Heatseeker Singles Chart.)	—	—	—	RIAA: Gold	Flower Boy
"See You Again" (featuring Kali Uchis)	2017	44	28	30	—	—	44	13	—	21	35	RIAA: 6× Platinum; ARIA: 6× Platinum; BPI: Platinum; GLF: Platinum; IFPI DEN: Platinum; MC: 2× Platinum; RMNZ: 6× Platinum; SNEP: Platinum	Flower Boy
"Okra"	2018	89	—	70	—	—	—	— (Note: "Okra" did not enter the NZ Top 40 Singles Chart, but it peaked at number 5 on the NZ Heatseeker Singles Chart.)	—	—	—	RIAA: Gold; MC: Gold	Non-album singles
"435"	2018	—	—	—	—	—	—	—	—	—	—		Non-album singles
"Peach Fuzz"	2018	—	—	—	—	—	—	—	—	—	—		Non-album singles
"Potato Salad" (with ASAP Rocky)	2018	—	—	—	—	—	—	—	—	—	—	RIAA: Platinum; BPI: Silver; RMNZ: Platinum	Non-album singles
"Earfquake" (featuring Playboi Carti)	2019	13	9	16	18	157	18	8	59	17	—	RIAA: 5× Platinum; ARIA: Platinum; BPI: Platinum; IFPI DEN: Gold; MC: 3× Platinum; RMNZ: 3× Platinum; SNEP: Platinum	Igor
"Best Interest"	2020	—	—	—	—	—	—	— (Note: "Best Interest" did not enter the NZ Top 40 Singles Chart, but it peaked at number 35 on the NZ Hot Singles Chart.)	—	—	—	RIAA: 2× Platinum; BPI: Gold; MC: Gold; RMNZ: Platinum	Non-album singles
"Group B"	2020	—	—	—	—	—	—	—	—	—	—		Non-album singles
"Tell Me How"	2021	—	—	—	—	—	—	—	—	—	—		Non-album singles
"Lumberjack"	2021	45	40	38	—	—	75	40	—	48	40	RIAA: Gold	Call Me If You Get Lost
"WusYaName" (featuring YoungBoy Never Broke Again and Ty Dolla Sign)	2021	14	22	22	—	—	24	14	—	25	19	RIAA: 2× Platinum; BPI: Silver; MC: Gold; RMNZ: Platinum	Call Me If You Get Lost
"Dogtooth"	2023	33	39	36	—	—	38	35	—	39	48	RIAA: Gold	Call Me If You Get Lost: The Estate Sale
"Sorry Not Sorry"	2023	48	—	53	—	—	—	— (Note: "Sorry Not Sorry" did not enter the NZ Top 40 Singles Chart, but it peaked at number three on the NZ Hot Singles Chart.)	—	63	91	RIAA: Gold	Call Me If You Get Lost: The Estate Sale
"Noid"	2024	10	13	22	—	—	12	14	96	16	73	RIAA: Platinum; MC: Gold	Chromakopia
"Sticky" (featuring GloRilla, Sexyy Red and Lil Wayne)	2024	10	33	26	—	—	63	25	—	57	23	RIAA: 3× Platinum; BPI: Silver; MC: Platinum; RMNZ: Gold	Chromakopia
"Like Him" (featuring Lola Young)	2025	29	55	43	—	147	28	28	— (Note: "Like Him" did not enter the Swedish Singellista Chart, but it peaked at number 16 on the Swedish Heatseeker Chart.)	30	37	RIAA: 2× Platinum; BPI: Gold; MC: Platinum; RMNZ: Platinum; SNEP: Gold	Chromakopia
"Ring Ring Ring"	2025	44	64	58	—	—	56	— (Note: "Ring Ring Ring" did not enter the NZ Top 40 Singles Chart, but it peaked at number five on the NZ Hot Singles Chart.)	—	62	53	RIAA: Gold	Don't Tap the Glass
"Sugar on My Tongue"	2025	41	19	39	—	—	31	27	— (Note: "Sugar on My Tongue" did not enter the Swedish Singellista Chart, but it peaked at number 10 on the Swedish Heatseeker Chart.)	27	29	RIAA: Platinum; ARIA: Gold; BPI: Silver; MC: Gold; RMNZ: Gold	Don't Tap the Glass
"Sugar on My Tongue (Freak Mix)"	2025	—	—	—	—	—	—	—	—	—	—		Non-album singles
"Sag Harbor"	2026	—	—	—	—	—	—	—	—	—	—		Non-album singles
"That Guy"	2026	— (Note: "That Guy" did not enter the Billboard Hot 100, but it peaked at number 17 on the Bubbling Under Hot 100 chart.)	—	—	—	—	—	— (Note: "That Guy" did not enter the NZ Top 40 Singles Chart, but it peaked at number 17 on the NZ Hot Singles Chart.)	—	—	—		Non-album singles
"—" denotes a recording that did not chart or was not released in that territory.

=== As featured artist ===
List of singles as a featured artist, with selected chart positions, showing year released and album name
Title	Year	Peak chart positions								Certifications	Album
Title	Year	US	US R&B/HH	US R&B	CAN	NZ Hot	IRE	UK	WW	Certifications	Album
"Trouble on My Mind" (Pusha T featuring Tyler, the Creator)	2011	—	—	—	—	—	—	—	—		Fear of God II: Let Us Pray
"Whoa" (Earl Sweatshirt featuring Tyler, the Creator)	2013	—	46	—	—	—	—	—	—		Doris
"Go (Gas)" (Domo Genesis featuring Wiz Khalifa, Juicy J and Tyler, the Creator)	2016	—	—	—	—	—	—	—	—		Genesis
"Telephone Calls" (ASAP Mob featuring ASAP Rocky, Tyler, the Creator, Playboi Carti and Yung Gleesh)	2016	—	— (Note: "Telephone Calls" did not enter the Hot R&B/Hip-Hop Songs chart, but it peaked at number ten on the Bubbling Under R&B/Hip-Hop Singles chart.)	—	—	—	—	—	—	RIAA: Gold	Cozy Tapes Vol. 1: Friends
"Biking" (Frank Ocean featuring Jay-Z and Tyler, the Creator)	2017	—	— (Note: "Biking" did not enter the Hot R&B/Hip-Hop Songs chart, but it peaked at number seven on the Bubbling Under R&B/Hip-Hop Singles chart.)	18	—	—	—	—	—	BPI: Silver; RMNZ: Platinum	Non-album single
"After the Storm" (Kali Uchis featuring Tyler, the Creator and Bootsy Collins)	2018	—	—	16	—	— (Note: "After the Storm" did not enter the NZ Hot Singles Chart, but it peaked at number eight on the NZ Heatseeker Singles Chart.)	—	—	—	RIAA: 3× Platinum; BPI: Gold; RMNZ: 2× Platinum	Isolation
"U Say" (GoldLink featuring Tyler, the Creator and Jay Prince)	2019	—	—	—	—	—	—	—	—		Diaspora
"Castaway" (Yuna featuring Tyler, the Creator)	2019	—	—	—	—	—	—	—	—		Rouge
"Fuego" (Channel Tres featuring Tyler, the Creator)	2020	—	—	—	—	—	—	—	—		I Can't Go Outside
"Gravity" (Brent Faiyaz featuring Tyler, the Creator)	2021	71	26	7	87	3	90	60	103	RIAA: 2× Platinum; BPI: Silver; RMNZ: Platinum	Wasteland
"Cash In Cash Out" (Pharrell Williams featuring 21 Savage and Tyler, the Creator)	2022	26	5	—	33	4	—	73	41	RIAA: Platinum	TBA
"Cracc Era" (Maxo Kream featuring Tyler, the Creator)	2024	—	—	—	—	—	—	—	—		Personification
"Look Like My Mama" (AZ Chike and Tyler, the Creator)	2026	— (Note: "Look Like My Mama" did not enter the Billboard Hot 100, but it peaked at number 25 on the Bubbling Under Hot 100 chart.)	—	—	—	—	—	—	—		No Rest for the Wicked
"Girls (Tyler, The Creator Remix)" (LilGoatD3 and Tyler, the Creator)	2026	—	—	—	—	—	—	—	—		Non-album single
"—" denotes a recording that did not chart or was not released in that territory.

== Other charted and certified songs ==
List of other charted songs, with selected chart positions, showing year released and album name
Title	Year	Peak chart positions										Certifications	Album
Title	Year	US	US R&B/HH	US Rap	AUS	CAN	IRE	NZ	UK	UK R&B	WW	Certifications	Album
"Martians vs. Goblins" (The Game featuring Lil Wayne and Tyler, The Creator)	2011	100	— (Note: "Martians vs. Goblins" did not enter the Billboard Hot R&B/Hip-Hop Songs chart but peaked at number 23 on the R&B/Hip-Hop Digital Song Sales chart.)	—	—	—	—	—	—	—	—		The R.E.D. Album
"Rella" (Odd Future featuring Hodgy Beats, Domo Genesis and Tyler, The Creator)	2012	—	— (Note: "Rella" did not enter the Billboard Hot R&B/Hip-Hop Songs chart but peaked at number 50 on the R&B/Hip-Hop Digital Song Sales chart.)	— (Note: "Rella" did not enter the Billboard Hot Rap Songs chart but peaked at number 42 on the Rap Digital Song Sales chart.)	—	—	—	—	—	—	—		The OF Tape Vol. 2
"IFHY" (featuring Pharrell)	2013	— (Note: "IFHY" did not enter the Billboard Hot 100 but did peak at number 24 on the Heatseekers Songs chart.)	47	— (Note: "IFHY" did not enter the Billboard Hot Rap Songs chart but peaked at number 41 on the Rap Digital Song Sales chart.)	—	—	—	—	—	—	—	RIAA: Platinum; RMNZ: Gold	Wolf
"Jamba" (featuring Hodgy Beats)	2013	—	—	— (Note: "Jamba" did not enter the Billboard Hot Rap Songs chart but peaked at number 50 on the Rap Digital Song Sales chart.)	—	—	—	—	—	—	—		Wolf
"Tamale"	2013	—	— (Note: "Tamale" did not enter the Billboard Hot R&B/Hip-Hop Songs chart, but it peaked at number three on the Bubbling Under R&B/Hip-Hop Singles chart.)	—	—	—	—	—	—	—	—	RIAA: Gold	Wolf
"Answer"	2013	—	—	—	—	—	—	—	—	—	—	RIAA: Gold	Wolf
"O.K." (Mac Miller featuring Tyler, The Creator)	2013	—	— (Note: "O.K." did not enter the Billboard Hot R&B/Hip-Hop Songs chart, but it peaked at number seven on the Bubbling Under R&B/Hip-Hop Singles chart.)	— (Note: "O.K." did not enter the Billboard Hot Rap Songs chart but peaked at number 26 on the Rap Digital Song Sales chart.)	—	—	—	—	—	—	—		Watching Movies with the Sound Off
"The Purge" (Schoolboy Q featuring Tyler, the Creator and Kurupt)	2014	—	— (Note: "The Purge" did not enter the Billboard Hot R&B/Hip-Hop Songs chart, but it peaked at number nine on the Bubbling Under R&B/Hip-Hop Singles chart.)	—	—	—	—	—	—	—	—		Oxymoron
"Smuckers" (featuring Lil Wayne and Kanye West)	2015	—	— (Note: "Smuckers" did not enter the Billboard Hot R&B/Hip-Hop Songs chart, but it peaked at number eight on the Bubbling Under R&B/Hip-Hop Singles chart.)	— (Note: "Smuckers" did not enter the Billboard Hot Rap Songs chart but peaked at number 30 on the Rap Digital Song Sales chart.)	—	—	—	—	—	—	—	RIAA: Gold	Cherry Bomb
"Foreword" (featuring Rex Orange County)	2017	—	—	—	—	—	—	—	—	—	—	RIAA: Gold	Flower Boy
"Where This Flower Blooms" (featuring Frank Ocean)	2017	—	—	—	—	—	—	—	—	—	—	RIAA: Platinum; MC: Gold; RMNZ: Gold	Flower Boy
"Glitter"	2017	—	—	—	—	—	—	—	—	—	—	RIAA: Platinum; RMNZ: Gold	Flower Boy
"Pothole" (featuring Jaden Smith)	2017	—	—	—	—	—	—	—	—	—	—	RIAA: Gold	Flower Boy
"November"	2017	—	—	—	—	—	—	—	—	—	—	RIAA: Gold	Flower Boy
"Garden Shed" (featuring Estelle)	2017	—	—	—	—	—	—	—	—	—	—	RIAA: Gold	Flower Boy
"Igor's Theme"	2019	67	33	— (Note: "Igor's Theme" did not enter the Billboard Hot Rap Songs chart but peaked at number 23 on the Rap Streaming Songs chart.)	45	68	34	— (Note: "Igor's Theme" did not enter the NZ Top 40 Singles Chart, but it peaked at number six on the NZ Hot Singles Chart.)	41	19	—	RIAA: Gold; MC: Gold; RMNZ: Gold	Igor
"I Think"	2019	51	22	18	30	51	28	30	30	12	—	RIAA: Platinum; MC: Platinum; BPI: Silver; RMNZ: Platinum	Igor
"Running Out of Time"	2019	65	32	— (Note: "Running Out of Time" did not enter the Billboard Hot Rap Songs chart but peaked at number 20 on the Rap Streaming Songs chart.)	48	69	93	— (Note: "Running Out of Time" did not enter the NZ Top 40 Singles Chart, but it peaked at number seven on the NZ Hot Singles Chart.)	—	21	—	RIAA: Platinum; MC: Gold; RMNZ: Gold	Igor
"New Magic Wand"	2019	70	34	— (Note: "New Magic Wand" did not enter the Billboard Hot Rap Songs chart but peaked at number 24 on the Rap Streaming Songs chart.)	53	73	—	—	—	—	—	RIAA: 2× Platinum; BPI: Gold; MC: Platinum; RMNZ: Platinum	Igor
"A Boy Is a Gun"	2019	74	36	—	56	75	—	—	—	—	—	RIAA: Platinum; MC: Gold; RMNZ: Gold	Igor
"Puppet"	2019	88	43	—	74	90	—	—	—	—	—	RIAA: Gold	Igor
"What's Good"	2019	85	41	—	62	80	—	—	—	—	—	RIAA: Gold	Igor
"Gone, Gone / Thank You"	2019	— (Note: "Gone, Gone / Thank You" did not enter the Billboard Hot 100, but it peaked at number 13 on the Bubbling Under Hot 100 chart.)	—	—	79	—	—	—	—	—	—	RIAA: 2× Platinum; BPI: Silver; MC: Platinum; RMNZ: Platinum	Igor
"I Don't Love You Anymore"	2019	— (Note: "I Don't Love You Anymore" did not enter the Billboard Hot 100, but it peaked at number eight on the Bubbling Under Hot 100 chart.)	— (Note: "I Don't Love You Anymore" did not enter the US Hot R&B/Hip-Hop Songs chart but peaked at number 13 on the Hot R&B Songs chart.)	—	—	—	—	—	—	—	—	RIAA: Gold	Igor
"Are We Still Friends?"	2019	— (Note: "Are We Still Friends?" did not enter the Billboard Hot 100, but it peaked at number 11 on the Bubbling Under Hot 100 chart.)	— (Note: "Are We Still Friends?" did enter the US Hot R&B/Hip-Hop Songs chart but peaked at number 12 on the Hot R&B Songs chart.)	—	—	—	—	—	—	—	—	RIAA: 3× Platinum; BPI: Silver; MC: Gold; RMNZ: Platinum	Igor
"Noize" (Jaden featuring Tyler, the Creator)	2019	—	—	—	—	—	—	— (Note: "Noize" did not enter the NZ Top 40 Singles Chart, but it peaked at number 29 on the NZ Hot Singles Chart.)	—	—	—		Erys
"T.D" (Lil Yachty and Tierra Whack featuring ASAP Rocky and Tyler, the Creator)	2020	83	34	—	—	—	— (Note: "T.D" did not enter the NZ Top 40 Singles Chart, but it peaked at number 11 on the NZ Hot Singles Chart.)	—	—	—	—		Lil Boat 3
"Sir Baudelaire" (featuring DJ Drama)	2021	59	26	23	67	60	—	—	—	—	60		Call Me If You Get Lost
"Corso"	2021	55	22	19	57	47	—	—	53	19	54	RIAA: Gold	Call Me If You Get Lost
"Lemonhead" (featuring 42 Dugg)	2021	42	15	12	51	35	48	— (Note: "Lemonhead" did not enter the NZ Top 40 Singles Chart, but it peaked at number seven on the NZ Hot Singles Chart.)	—	—	41	RIAA: Gold	Call Me If You Get Lost
"Hot Wind Blows" (featuring Lil Wayne)	2021	48	19	16	58	49	—	— (Note: "Hot Wind Blows" did not enter the NZ Top 40 Singles Chart, but it peaked at number eight on the NZ Hot Singles Chart.)	—	20	46	RIAA: Gold	Call Me If You Get Lost
"Massa"	2021	66	31	—	77	67	—	—	—	—	72		Call Me If You Get Lost
"RunItUp" (featuring Teezo Touchdown)	2021	68	32	—	92	70	—	—	—	—	77	RIAA: Gold	Call Me If You Get Lost
"Manifesto" (featuring Domo Genesis)	2021	84	35	—	—	93	—	—	—	—	109		Call Me If You Get Lost
"Sweet / I Thought You Wanted to Dance" (featuring Brent Faiyaz and Fana Hues)	2021	60	27	24	69	61	—	—	—	—	62	RIAA: Platinum; RMNZ: Platinum	Call Me If You Get Lost
"Momma Talk"	2021	— (Note: "Momma Talk" did not enter the Billboard Hot 100, but it peaked at number 15 on the Bubbling Under Hot 100 chart.)	—	—	—	—	—	—	—	—	—		Call Me If You Get Lost
"Rise!" (featuring Daisy World)	2021	99	45	—	—	—	—	—	—	—	145		Call Me If You Get Lost
"Blessed"	2021	— (Note: "Blessed" did not enter the Billboard Hot 100, but it peaked at number 16 on the Bubbling Under Hot 100 chart.)	—	—	—	—	—	—	—	—	—		Call Me If You Get Lost
"Juggernaut" (featuring Lil Uzi Vert and Pharrell Williams)	2021	40	14	11	49	30	—	36	—	—	38	RIAA: Gold	Call Me If You Get Lost
"Wilshire"	2021	95	41	—	—	—	—	—	—	—	131		Call Me If You Get Lost
"Safari"	2021	— (Note: "Safari" did not enter the Billboard Hot 100, but it peaked at number 13 on the Bubbling Under Hot 100 chart.)	—	—	—	—	—	—	—	—	—		Call Me If You Get Lost
"Neon Peach" (Snoh Aalegra featuring Tyler, the Creator)	2021	—	— (Note: "Neon Peach" did not enter the US Hot R&B/Hip-Hop Songs chart but peaked at number 15 on the Hot R&B Songs chart.)	—	—	—	—	—	—	—	—		Temporary Highs in the Violet Skies
"Here We Go... Again" (The Weeknd featuring Tyler, the Creator)	2022	52	19	—	46	21	—	—	— (Note: "Here We Go... Again" did not enter the UK Singles Chart, as chart rules only allow three songs per artist to chart within the top one hundred at a time, but it peaked at number 59 on the Official UK Streaming chart.)	—	26		Dawn FM
"Lost and Found Freestyle 2019" (with Nigo and ASAP Rocky)	2022	— (Note: "Lost and Found Freesyle 2019" did not enter the Billboard Hot 100, but it peaked at number six on the Bubbling Under Hot 100 chart.)	40	—	—	89	—	— (Note: "Lost and Found Freestyle 2019" did not enter the NZ Top 40 Singles Chart, but it peaked at number 12 on the NZ Hot Singles Chart.)	—	—	—		I Know Nigo!
"Come On, Let's Go" (with Nigo)	2022	— (Note: "Come On, Let's Go" did not enter the Billboard Hot 100, but it peaked at number four on the Bubbling Under Hot 100 chart.)	35	—	—	—	—	— (Note: "Come On, Let's Go" did not enter the NZ Top 40 Singles Chart, but it peaked at number seven on the NZ Hot Singles Chart.)	—	—	—		I Know Nigo!
"Stuntman" (featuring Vince Staples)	2023	— (Note: "Stuntman" did not enter the Billboard Hot 100, but it peaked at number 14 on the Bubbling Under Hot 100 chart.)	39	—	—	—	—	—	—	—	—		Call Me If You Get Lost: The Estate Sale
"What a Day"	2023	— (Note: "What a Day" did not enter the Billboard Hot 100, but it peaked at number 13 on the Bubbling Under Hot 100 chart.)	38	25	—	—	—	—	—	—	—		Call Me If You Get Lost: The Estate Sale
"Wharf Talk" (featuring ASAP Rocky)	2023	89	28	—	—	91	—	— (Note: "Wharf Talk" did not enter the NZ Top 40 Singles Chart, but it peaked at number 11 on the NZ Hot Singles Chart.)	—	—	—		Call Me If You Get Lost: The Estate Sale
"Heaven to Me"	2023	— (Note: "Heaven to Me" did not enter the Billboard Hot 100, but it peaked at number 11 on the Bubbling Under Hot 100 chart.)	37	24	—	—	—	— (Note: "Heaven to Me" did not enter the NZ Top 40 Singles Chart, but it peaked at number 23 on the NZ Hot Singles Chart.)	—	—	—		Call Me If You Get Lost: The Estate Sale
"Boyfriend, Girlfriend" (2020 Demo) (featuring YG)	2023	— (Note: "Boyfriend, Girlfriend" (2020 Demo) did not enter the Billboard Hot 100, but it peaked at number 22 on the Bubbling Under Hot 100 chart.)	43	—	—	—	—	—	—	—	—		Call Me If You Get Lost: The Estate Sale
"St. Chroma" (featuring Daniel Caesar)	2024	7	1	1	15	21	10	11	15	—	10	RIAA: Platinum; BPI: Silver; MC: Gold; RMNZ: Gold	Chromakopia
"Rah Tah Tah"	2024	16	5	5	25	31	27	27	—	—	26	RIAA: Platinum; MC: Gold	Chromakopia
"Darling, I" (featuring Teezo Touchdown)	2024	15	4	4	24	29	29	19	24	—	24	RIAA: Platinum; MC: Gold; RMNZ: Gold	Chromakopia
"Hey Jane"	2024	33	12	8	53	51	—	—	—	—	39		Chromakopia
"I Killed You"	2024	46	18	13	68	55	—	—	—	—	56		Chromakopia
"Judge Judy"	2024	40	15	11	64	54	—	—	—	—	51	RIAA: Gold	Chromakopia
"Take Your Mask Off" (featuring Daniel Caesar and LaToiya Williams)	2024	42	16	12	63	53	—	—	—	—	54	RIAA: Gold	Chromakopia
"Tomorrow"	2024	53	20	14	89	63	—	—	—	—	83		Chromakopia
"Thought I Was Dead" (featuring Schoolboy Q and Santigold)	2024	32	11	7	58	49	—	—	—	—	41	RIAA: Platinum; MC: Gold	Chromakopia
"Balloon" (featuring Doechii)	2024	56	20	15	—	68	—	—	—	—	90	RIAA: Gold	Chromakopia
"I Hope You Find Your Way Home"	2024	65	25	18	—	78	—	—	—	—	132		Chromakopia
"Big Poe" (with Pharrell Williams featuring Sk8brd)	2025	33	5	5	63	57	44	38	43	—	42		Don't Tap the Glass
"Sucka Free"	2025	48	12	6	—	74	67	— (Note: "Sucka Free" did not enter the NZ Top 40 Singles Chart, but it peaked at number 6 on the NZ Hot Singles Chart.)	58	—	77		Don't Tap the Glass
"Mommanem"	2025	54	16	8	—	88	—	—	—	—	114		Don't Tap the Glass
"Stop Playing with Me"	2025	51	13	7	—	79	—	—	—	—	95		Don't Tap the Glass
"Don't Tap That Glass / Tweakin'"	2025	56	17	9	—	93	—	—	—	—	119		Don't Tap the Glass
"Don't You Worry Baby" (featuring Madison McFerrin)	2025	59	18	—	—	94	—	—	—	—	129		Don't Tap the Glass
"I'll Take Care of You" (featuring Yebba)	2025	55	15	—	—	89	—	—	—	—	113		Don't Tap the Glass
"Tell Me What It Is"	2025	82	26	—	—	—	—	—	—	—	—		Don't Tap the Glass
"—" denotes a recording that did not chart or was not released in that territory.

== Guest appearances ==
List of non-single guest appearances, with other performing artists, showing year released and album name
Title	Year	Other performer(s)	Album
"Why Don't We Fall in Love"	2007	Casey Veggies	Customized Greatly Vol. 1
"BlaccFriday"	2010	MellowHype, Mike G	YelloWhite
"Rasta"	2010	MellowHype	YelloWhite
"Couch"	2010	Earl Sweatshirt	Earl
"Pigions"	2010	Earl Sweatshirt	Earl
"Timeless"	2010	Mike G	Ali
"BlaccFriday"	2010	Mike G, MellowHype	Ali
"Rolling Papers"	2010	Domo Genesis	Rolling Papers
"Super Market"	2010	Domo Genesis	Rolling Papers
"Fuck Police"	2010	MellowHype	BlackenedWhite
"Chordoroy"	2010	MellowHype, Earl Sweatshirt	BlackenedWhite
"DTA"	2010	Casey Veggies	Sleeping in Class
"Welcome Home Son"	2010	The Jet Age of Tomorrow, Casey Veggies	The Journey to the 5th Echelon
"Martians vs. Goblins"	2011	Game, Lil Wayne	The R.E.D. Album
"Whole City Behind Us"	2011	Domo Genesis	Under the Influence
"Oooh"	2011	Pusha T, Hodgy Beats, Liva Don	Play Cloths Holiday 2011
"PNCINTLOFWGKTA"	2012	Casey Veggies, Domo Genesis, Hodgy Beats, Earl Sweatshirt	Customized Greatly Vol. 3
"Golden Girl"	2012	Frank Ocean	Channel Orange
"No Idols"	2012	Domo Genesis, The Alchemist	No Idols
"I'ma Hata"	2012	DJ Drama, Waka Flocka Flame, Derez De'Shon	Quality Street Music
"Blossom & Burn"	2012	Trash Talk, Hodgy Beats	119
"O.K."	2013	Mac Miller	Watching Movies with the Sound Off
"Sasquatch"	2013	Earl Sweatshirt	Doris
"Garbage"	2013	—N/a	The Music of Grand Theft Auto V
"Remix"	2013	MellowHigh	MellowHigh
"The Purge"	2014	ScHoolboy Q, Kurupt	Oxymoron
"Palace/Curse"	2015	The Internet, Steve Lacy	Ego Death
"RIP"	2015	Casey Veggies	Live & Grow
"You're a Mean One, Mr. Grinch"	2018	—N/a	Dr. Seuss' The Grinch: Original Motion Picture Soundtrack
"I Am the Grinch"	2018	Fletcher Jones	Dr. Seuss' The Grinch: Original Motion Picture Soundtrack
"NAGA"	2018	$ilkMoney	I Hate My Life and I Really Wish People Would Stop Telling Me Not To
"Kitt-Katt"	2018	$ilkMoney	I Hate My Life and I Really Wish People Would Stop Telling Me Not To
"Noize"	2019	Jaden	Erys
"Automatic Driver" (Tyler, the Creator Remix)	2020	La Roux	Non-album single
"327"	2020	Westside Gunn, Joey Bada$$, Billie Essco	Pray for Paris
"Something to Rap About"	2020	Freddie Gibbs, The Alchemist	Alfredo
"T.D"	2020	Lil Yachty, Tierra Whack, ASAP Rocky	Lil Boat 3
"Neon Peach"	2021	Snoh Aalegra	Temporary Highs in the Violet Skies
"In the Moment"	2021	Snoh Aalegra	Temporary Highs in the Violet Skies
"Big Persona"	2021	Maxo Kream	Weight of the World
"The Fly who couldn't Fly straight"	2021	Westside Gunn	Hitler Wears Hermes 8: Side B
"Here We Go... Again"	2022	The Weeknd	Dawn FM
"Lost and Found Freestyle 2019"	2022	Nigo, ASAP Rocky	I Know Nigo!
"Come on, Let's Go"	2022	Nigo	I Know Nigo!
"OPEN A WINDOW"	2022	Rex Orange County	Who Cares?
"Legendary"	2023	DJ Drama	I'm Really Like That
"VIRGINIA Boy (Remix)"	2024	Pharrell Williams	Piece by Piece
"P.O.V."	2025	Clipse	Let God Sort Em Out
"Fish N Steak (What It Is)"	2026	ASAP Rocky, Jozzy	Don't Be Dumb
"The World Is Ours"	2026	AZ Chike	No Rest for the Wicked
"Baby Breath"	2026	Quavo, Pharrell Williams, ASAP Rocky	Qrömelife

== Music videos ==
=== As lead artist ===
List of music videos, with directors, showing year released and album
Title	Year	Director(s)	Album
"Bastard"	2010	Wolf Haley, Taco Bennett	Bastard
"French!" (featuring Hodgy Beats)	2010	Wolf Haley, Taco Bennett	Bastard
"VCR"	2010	Wolf Haley, Taco Bennett	Bastard
"Yonkers"	2011	Wolf Haley	Goblin
"She" (featuring Frank Ocean)	2011	Wolf Haley	Goblin
"Bitch Suck Dick" (featuring Jasper Dolphin and Taco)	2011	Wolf Haley	Goblin
"Rella" (with Hodgy Beats and Domo Genesis)	2012	Wolf Haley	The OF Tape Vol. 2
"NY (Ned Flander)" (with Hodgy Beats)	2012	Wolf Haley	The OF Tape Vol. 2
"Sam (Is Dead)" (with Domo Genesis)	2012	Wolf Haley	The OF Tape Vol. 2
"Domo23 / Bimmer"	2013	Wolf Haley	Wolf
"IFHY / Jamba"	2013	Wolf Haley	Wolf
"Tamale / Answer"	2013	Wolf Haley	Wolf
"Fucking Young / Deathcamp"	2015	Wolf Haley	Cherry Bomb
"Buffalo / Find Your Wings"	2015	Wolf Haley	Cherry Bomb
"Perfect"	2015	Wolf Haley	Cherry Bomb
"What the Fuck Right Now"	2016	Mikey Alfred	Non-album single
"Who Dat Boy / 911" (featuring ASAP Rocky, Steve Lacy, and Frank Ocean)	2017	Wolf Haley	Flower Boy
"Okra"	2018	Tyler Okonma	Non-album single
"Potato Salad" (featuring ASAP Rocky)	2018	Tyler Okonma	Non-album single
"See You Again / Where This Flower Blooms" (featuring Kali Uchis and Frank Ocean)	2018	Tyler Okonma	Flower Boy
"Earfquake"	2019	Tyler Okonma	Igor
"A Boy Is a Gun"	2019	Tyler Okonma	Igor
"I Think"	2019	Tyler Okonma	Igor
"Best Interest"	2019	Wyatt Navarro	Non-album single
"Lumberjack"	2021	Tyler Okonma	Call Me If You Get Lost
"Wusyaname"	2021	Tyler Okonma	Call Me If You Get Lost
"Juggernaut"	2021	Tyler Okonma	Call Me If You Get Lost
"Corso"	2021	Tyler Okonma	Call Me If You Get Lost
"Lemonhead"	2021	Tyler Okonma	Call Me If You Get Lost
"Dogtooth"	2023	Tyler Okonma	Call Me If You Get Lost: The Estate Sale
"Sorry Not Sorry"	2023	Tyler Okonma	Call Me If You Get Lost: The Estate Sale
"Wharf Talk"	2023	Tyler Okonma	Call Me If You Get Lost: The Estate Sale
"Heaven to Me"	2023	Tyler Okonma	Call Me If You Get Lost: The Estate Sale
"Hot Wind Blows"	2023	Lazaro Rodriguez	Call Me If You Get Lost: The Estate Sale
"St. Chroma"	2024	Tyler Okonma	Chromakopia
"Noid"	2024	Tyler Okonma	Chromakopia
"Thought I Was Dead"	2024	Tyler Okonma	Chromakopia
"That Guy"	2024	Tyler Okonma	Non-album single
"Sticky"	2025	Tyler Okonma	Chromakopia
"Stop Playing with Me"	2025	Tyler Okonma	Don't Tap the Glass
"Sugar on My Tongue"	2025	Tyler Okonma	Don't Tap the Glass
"Darling, I" (featuring Teezo Touchdown)	2025	Tyler Okonma	Chromakopia
"Sucka Free"	2025	Jasper Dolphin	Don't Tap the Glass
"Sag Harbor"	2025	Tyler Okonma	Non-album single

=== As featured artist ===
List of music videos, with directors, showing year released
Title	Year	Director(s)
"Trouble on My Mind" (Pusha T featuring Tyler, The Creator)	2011	Jason Goldwatch
"Martians vs. Goblins" (Game featuring Lil Wayne and Tyler, The Creator)	2011	Matt Alonzo
"Whoa" (Earl Sweatshirt featuring Tyler, The Creator)	2013	Wolf Haley
"Special Affair/Curse" (The Internet featuring Steve Lacy & Tyler, The Creator)	2016	Calmatic
"After the Storm" (Kali Uchis featuring Tyler, the Creator & Bootsy Collins)	2018	Nadia Lee Cohen
"U Say" (GoldLink featuring Tyler, The Creator and Jay Prince)	2019	Santi
"Castaway" (Yuna featuring Tyler, The Creator)	2019	Adam Sinclair
"Big Persona" (Maxo Kream featuring Tyler, the Creator)	2021	Wolf Haley
"Come On, Let's Go" (Nigo featuring Tyler, the Creator)	2022	Luis "Panch" Perez
"Cash In Cash Out" (Pharrell Williams featuring Tyler, the Creator and 21 Savage)	2022	François Rousselet
"Cracc Era" (Maxo Kream featuring Tyler, the Creator)	2024	Karim Belkasemi
"P.O.V." (Clipse featuring Tyler, the Creator)	2025	Cole Bennett
"Look Like My Mama" (AZ Chike featuring Tyler, the Creator)	2026	Stacking Memories

== See also ==
- Odd Future discography
