= Don't Tap the Glass =

Studio album by Tyler, the Creator
- Released: July 21, 2025
- Recorded: December 2024; 2025
- Genres: Dance rap; hip house; funk; techno
- Length: 28:30
- Label: Columbia
- Producers: Tyler, the Creator

Tyler, the Creator chronology
Chromakopia (2024)	Don't Tap the Glass (2025)

Singles from Don't Tap the Glass
- 1. "Ring Ring Ring" Released: July 30, 2025; 2. "Sugar on My Tongue" Released: August 20, 2025

Don't Tap the Glass (stylized in all caps) is the ninth studio album by American rapper and producer Tyler, the Creator. It was released through Columbia Records on July 21, 2025. The album includes guest appearances from American songwriters Pharrell Williams (under both his name and his alter ego, Sk8brd), Madison McFerrin, and Yebba. Tyler was the sole producer of all ten tracks.

Don't Tap the Glass was supported by two singles: "Ring Ring Ring" and "Sugar on My Tongue", which were serviced to US rhythmic radio on July 30 and August 20, respectively. The album received positive reviews from critics and debuted at number one on the Billboard 200. Its release date coincides with the eighth anniversary of Tyler's fifth studio album, Flower Boy (2017).

Don't Tap the Glass was teased three days prior to release through art installations during Tyler's Chromakopia: The World Tour, along with a website that promoted merchandise that was associated with the album's title. Heavy speculation regarding the album's guest appearances and track listing, fueled by early media reports, was debunked by Tyler in the lead-up to the release. On July 20, Tyler held a listening party in Los Angeles, California, for 300 guests, throughout which a ban on cameras and cell phones was enforced. In 2026, Tyler has embarked a Latin American tour, including headline appearances at the Festival Estéreo Picnic and Lollapalooza Chile, Argentina, and Brazil.

== Background and release ==
Tyler began work on the album in December 2024, and recorded for most of the album during his Chromakopia: The World Tour.

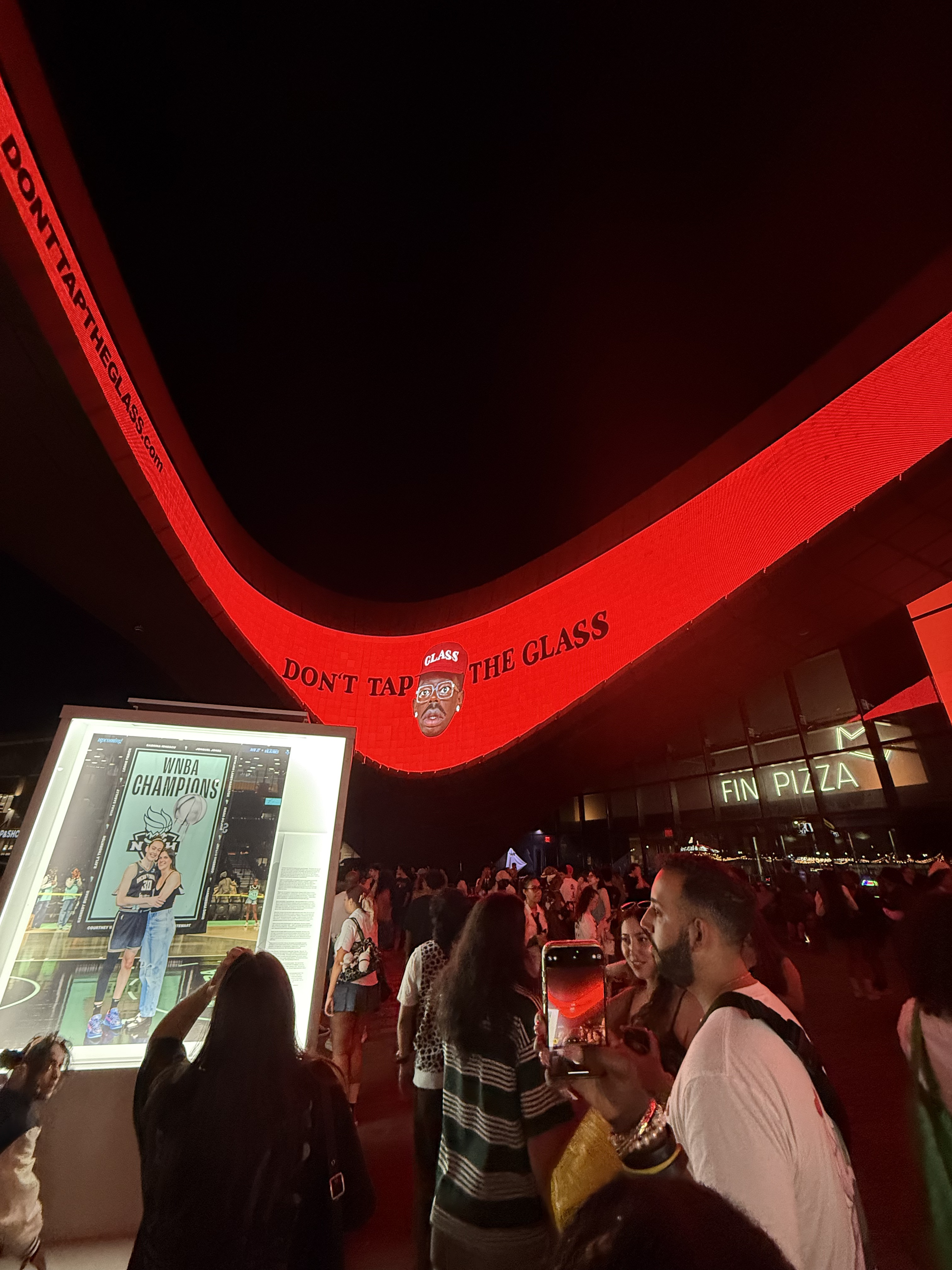
July 18th NYC outside Chromakopia Concert

The title was first used during a concert at Barclays Center on July 18, 2025, as part of Chromakopia: The World Tour; an art installation was outside the venue, featuring a figure enclosed in a clear box, with the title written on the front. An identical art installation appeared at the World Trade Center. Tyler, who had previously teased something scheduled for July 21 on Instagram, also shouted the title to the crowd. Following the concert, the Golf Wang website was updated with new merchandise—including vinyl records, T-shirts, and hats—featuring the album's branding. On July 19, a website (donttaptheglass.com) was established, promoting the album and selling merchandise branded with the album's title. The website also displayed three boxes in blue, yellow, and red, respectively, with cryptic messages.

A fabricated track listing was reposted on Twitter by Complex magazine on July 19, 2025, showing guest appearances from Kendrick Lamar and Earl Sweatshirt, among others. The post gained traction with fans until Tyler responded, saying that the information was false; Complex subsequently deleted the tweet and apologized. Tyler also denied speculation that the album would be a concept album. In an interview with Zane Lowe, Tyler described the album's quick rollout as "freeing", stating: "I didn't want to spend three years and try to be super innovative. [...] Bro, I made an album, I was done." He stated the goal of the album was "to be fun and say outrageous shit and say shit that… inside jokes that me and my friends laugh at, and just talk big fly shit" and that he "just wanted to be silly again".

On the eve of the album's release, Tyler held a listening party at the Hollywood Forever Cemetery, promoting it saying "Don’t Come If You Aren’t Going To Dance". Afterwards, he told fans it was one of the "greatest nites [sic] of my life", and encouraged listeners to enjoy the album "at full volume" while "dancing, driving, [or] running". Through a social media statement, Tyler spoke openly about the effects of video recordings at concerts, attributing it to the decline of dancing:

"I asked some friends why they don't dance in public and some said because of the fear of being filmed. I thought damn, a natural form of expression and a certain connection they have with music is now a ghost. It made me wonder how much of our human spirit got killed because of the fear of being a meme, all for having a good time... This album was not made for sitting still. Dancing driving running any type of movement is recommended to maybe understand the spirit of it. Only at full volume."

— Tyler, the Creator

Don't Tap the Glass was released on July 21, 2025, through Columbia Records.

== Promotion ==
The Don't Tap the Glass album logo, using a modified version of Scriptorium's Bastion font

Hours after the album's release, Tyler, the Creator released a music video for "Stop Playing with Me", which featured cameos from Clipse (brothers Pusha T and Malice), LeBron James, and Maverick Carter.

In the following days after, Tyler released five videos with the songs "Sucka Free", "Don't Tap That Glass / Tweakin'", "Ring Ring Ring" and "Big Poe" to further promote the album, these videos would consist of people dancing to the album and flashing the logo of the album in the last few seconds. The videos with "Don't Tap That Glass / Tweakin" were released separately, rather than both parts being in one video. The video for the second part of "Don't Tap That Glass / Tweakin" was released early via a locked Instagram story on Tyler's Instagram page CHROMAKOPIA.

On July 23, 2025, Tyler held a second listening party in the Under the ‘K’ Bridge Park in Brooklyn, New York. A music video for "Sugar on My Tongue", directed by Tyler himself, was released on August 12, 2025. A music video for "Sucka Free" was released on August 27, 2025.

To further promote the album, Tyler has embarked on a Latin American tour in March 2026, headlining Festival Estéreo Picnic and the South American editions of Lollapalooza, and with solo shows in San José, Mexico City, Guadalajara and San Juan.

== Composition ==
Don't Tap the Glass has been described by journalists as a rap house, dance, house, funk and techno album. At twenty-eight minutes and thirty seconds in length, Don't Tap the Glass is the shortest studio album in Tyler, the Creator's discography and the second-shortest release overall, behind the ten minutes and twenty-two seconds EP Music Inspired by Illumination & Dr. Seuss' The Grinch (2018). Don't Tap the Glass has 10 tracks—the smallest number of tracks on any studio album from Tyler.

The opening track "Big Poe" samples "Roked" by Shye Ben Tzur at the start of the track, and samples "Pass the Courvoisier, Part II" by Busta Rhymes, featuring Sean Combs and Pharrell Williams. The seventh track, "Don't Tap That Glass / Tweakin'" is a New Orleans bounce song. The eighth track, "Don't You Worry Baby", contains elements of Atlanta bass and Miami bass. The ninth track, "I'll Take Care of You", is a jungle song and samples "Cherry Bomb" by Tyler, the Creator and "Knuck If You Buck" by Crime Mob, featuring Lil Scrappy.

For this album, Tyler, the Creator has taken inspiration from many other things around him and from his childhood, ranging from a wide variety of people to tangible things. One band in particular that Tyler took inspiration from was the Zambian rock band, known as the Ngozi Family. When presented with the physical cover of the Ngozi Family LP titled “45,000 Volts" by famous interviewer Nardwuar, Tyler goes on to explain how he particularly enjoys the graphic design used for the back cover of the LP. Tyler describes that he loves the cutout and the jagged ends of the cover that surrounds an image of the band members who are appearing as clumsy. The look of the jagged ends can be described as a child using safety scissors to cut it out. It is noticed that on the physical copy of Tyler’s album “Don't Tap the Glass”, it has similar jagged ends around his own image just like the cover for the LP “45,000” by the Ngozi Family.

== Critical reception ==
Professional ratings
Aggregate scores
Source	Rating
AnyDecentMusic?	7.1/10
Metacritic	77/100
Review scores
Source	Rating
AllMusic	3.5/5 stars
Clash	7/10
Consequence	B+
The Guardian	4/5 stars
The Line of Best Fit	8/10
NME	4/5 stars
MusicOMH	4/5 stars
Pitchfork	7.7/10
Rolling Stone	3.5/5 stars
Slant Magazine	2/5 stars

Don't Tap the Glass received positive reviews from music critics. According to the review aggregator Metacritic, Don't Tap the Glass received "generally favorable reviews" based on a weighted average score of 77 out of 100 from 11 critic scores. The review aggregator site AnyDecentMusic? compiled 10 reviews and gave the album an average of 7.1 out of 10, based on their assessment of the critical consensus.

John Amen's review for The Line of Best Fit concludes that "Tyler doesn't break new ground as much as he amends the soil that's already there" and that it emphasizes how multifaceted he is. Shahzaib Hussain of Clash described the album as a "mash-up of shrewd and slinky dancefloor capers that dials back the conceptual overload, hits the reset button and revels in fun." Writing for HotNewHipHop, Gabriel Bras Nevares gave the album a positive review, calling it the "shortest, sweetest, most blunt, and most smack-talking LP in his entire discography."

=== Accolades ===
Ceremony	Year	Award	Result	Ref.
Grammy Awards	2026	Best Alternative Music Album	Nominated	
BET Awards	2026	Album of the Year	Nominated	

=== Year-end lists ===
Publication	Accolade	Rank	Ref.
Billboard	The 50 Best Albums of 2025	8	
Clash	Albums Of The Year 2025	44	
Complex	The 50 Best Albums of 2025	17	
Consequence	The 50 Best Albums of 2025	13	
Consequence	The 25 Best Rap Albums of 2025	8	
Crack	The Top 50 Albums of 2025	23	
Exclaim!	50 Best Albums of 2025	15	
The Fader	The 50 best albums of 2025	50	
HotNewHipHop	The 40 Best Rap Albums of 2025	20	
HuffPost	The Best Albums Of 2025	—N/a	
NME	The 50 best albums of 2025	38	
Paste	The 25 best rap albums of 2025	24	
Pitchfork	The 30 Best Pop Albums of 2025	26	
Rolling Stone	The 25 Best Hip-Hop Albums of 2025	10	
Stereogum	The 50 Best Albums Of 2025	39	
Stereogum	The 10 Best Rap Albums Of 2025	7	
Variety	Top 10 Albums of 2025	7	

== Commercial performance ==
In the United States, Don't Tap the Glass debuted atop the Billboard 200, with first-week sales of 197,000 album-equivalent units, consisting of 93.34 million on-demand streams and 128,000 pure album sales, earning Tyler, the Creator his fourth consecutive number one album on the chart.

== Track listing ==
All tracks are written and produced by Tyler Okonma, with additional writers noted.

No.	Title	Writer(s)	Length
1.	"Big Poe" (with Pharrell Williams / featuring Sk8brd)	Williams; Shye Ben Tzur^{[a]}; Jonathan Greenwood^{[a]}; Trevor Smith^{[a]}; Chad Hugo^{[a]}; Dominick Lamb^{[a]}; Sandy Linzer^{[a]}; Denny Randell^{[a]}; Michael Tyler^{[a]}; Kamaal Fareed^{[a]}; Malik Taylor^{[a]}; Ali Muhammad^{[a]}; Bryan Higgins^{[a]}; James Jackson^{[a]}; Bernard Edwards^{[a]}; Nile Rodgers^{[a]}	3:02
2.	"Sugar on My Tongue"		2:33
3.	"Sucka Free"		2:41
4.	"Mommanem"	Tommi Eckart^{[b]}; Nicholas Deinhardt^{[b]}	1:15
5.	"Stop Playing with Me"		2:13
6.	"Ring Ring Ring"	Ray Parker Jr.^{[c]}	3:21
7.	"Don't Tap That Glass / Tweakin'"	Todd Shaw^{[d]}; Tommy Wright III^{[d]}	3:42
8.	"Don't You Worry Baby" (featuring Madison McFerrin)	McFerrin; Isiah Pinkney^{[e]}; Robert F. Gordon^{[e]}; Carlos Morgan^{[e]}	2:58
9.	"I'll Take Care of You" (featuring Yebba)	Abigail Smith; Brittany Carpentero^{[f]}; Chris Henderson^{[f]}; Jarques Usher^{[f]}; Jonathan Lewis^{[f]}; Alphonse Smith^{[f]}; Venetia Lewis^{[f]}	3:20
10.	"Tell Me What It Is"		3:22
Total length:			28:30

CD and vinyl release
No.	Title	Length
10.	"Down Bad"	2:01
11.	"Tell Me What It Is"	3:17
Total length:		30:26

Sample credits

- ^{^[a]} "Big Poe" contains samples of "Pass the Courvoisier, Part II", written by Chad Hugo, Jermaine Denny, Trevor Smith, and Pharrell Williams, and performed by Busta Rhymes featuring P. Diddy and Williams; (Note: "Pass the Courvoisier, Part II" is a remix of another Busta Rhymes track of the same name, which itself contains elements of the following songs: "Easy Come, Easy Go", written by Sandy Linzer and Denny Randell and performed by Odyssey; "Shake Ya Ass", written by Michael Tyler, Pharrell Williams and Chad Hugo and performed by Mystikal; "Scenario", written by Kamaal Fareed, Bryan Higgins, James Jackson, Ali Shaheed Muhammad, Trevor Smith and Malik Taylor and performed by A Tribe Called Quest featuring Leaders of the New School; "Rapper's Delight", written by Bernard Edwards and Nile Rodgers and performed by the Sugarhill Gang.; This sample is additionally not included on physical versions of the album.) and "Roked", written by Shye Ben Tzur, and performed by Jonny Greenwood, the Rajasthan Express and Tzur.
- ^{^[b]} "Mommanem" contains a sample of "Montagehalle", written by Tommi Eckart and Nicholas Deinhardt, and performed by Gorilla Aktiv.
- ^{^[c]} "Ring Ring Ring" contains a sample of "All in the Way You Get Down", written and performed by Ray Parker Jr. with Raydio.
- ^{^[d]} "Don't Tap That Glass / Tweakin" contains a sample of "Dope Fiend Beat", written by Todd Shaw, and performed by Too Short; and contains a sample of "Meet Yo Maker", written and performed by Tommy Wright III.
- ^{^[e]} "Don't You Worry Baby" contains an interpolation of "Let Me Ride", written by Carlos Morgan, Isiah Pinkney and Robert "Flash" Gordon, and performed by 12 Gauge.
- ^{^[f]} "I'll Take Care of You" contains samples of "Cherry Bomb", written and performed by Tyler, the Creator; and contains a sample of "Knuck If You Buck", written by Brittany Carpentero, Chris Henderson, Jarques Usher, Jonathan Lewis, and Venetia Lewis, and performed by Crime Mob.

== Personnel ==
Credits adapted from Qobuz.

- Tyler, the Creator – executive production, production (all tracks), recording (all tracks)
- Ron "T.nava" Avant – vocoder (tracks 2–3, 6)
- Swizz Beatz – vocals (track 7)
- Vic Wainstein – recording (tracks 2–3, 6, 8–10)
- Ivan Marcelo – assistant recording (tracks 3, 6)
- Garrett Duncan – assistant recording (track 8)
- Danforth Webster – assistant recording (track 9)
- Collin Clark – assistant recording (track 10)
- Neal H Pogue – mixing (all tracks)
- Zachary Acosta – assistant mixing (all tracks)
- Mike Bozzi – mastering (all tracks)

== Charts ==
=== Weekly charts ===
Weekly chart performance for Don't Tap the Glass
Chart (2025)	Peak position
Australian Albums (ARIA)	4
Australian Hip Hop/R&B Albums (ARIA)	1
Austrian Albums (Ö3 Austria)	4
Belgian Albums (Ultratop Flanders)	1
Belgian Albums (Ultratop Wallonia)	3
Canadian Albums (Billboard)	6
Danish Albums (Hitlisten)	10
Dutch Albums (Album Top 100)	2
Finnish Albums (Suomen virallinen lista)	22
French Albums (SNEP)	33
German Albums (Offizielle Top 100)	4
Hungarian Albums (MAHASZ)	14
Icelandic Albums (Tónlistinn)	5
Irish Albums (Official Charts)	2
Italian Albums (FIMI)	10
Japanese Dance & Soul Albums (Oricon)	3
Japanese Digital Albums (Oricon)	25
Japanese Western Albums (Oricon)	25
Japanese Hot Albums (Billboard Japan)	17
Lithuanian Albums (AGATA)	5
New Zealand Albums (RMNZ)	4
Norwegian Albums (IFPI Norge)	14
Polish Albums (ZPAV)	6
Portuguese Albums (AFP)	1
Scottish Albums (Official Charts)	1
Spanish Albums (PROMUSICAE)	25
Swedish Albums (Sverigetopplistan)	6
Swiss Albums (Schweizer Hitparade)	1
UK Albums (Official Charts)	2
UK R&B Albums (Official Charts)	1
US Billboard 200	1
US Top R&B/Hip-Hop Albums (Billboard)	1

=== Year-end charts ===
Year-end chart performance for Don't Tap the Glass
Chart (2025)	Position
US Billboard 200	148
US Top R&B/Hip-Hop Albums (Billboard)	42

== Certifications ==
Certifications and sales
Region	Certification	Certified units/sales
United States (RIAA)	Gold	500,000^{‡}
^{‡} Sales+streaming figures based on certification alone.
