= Peach Fuzz =

Peach Fuzz may refer to:

- Vellus hair or peach fuzz, fine hair on human children
- Peach Fuzz (comics), an English-language manga 2005–7
- Peach Fuzz (album), by Enuff Z'Nuff, 1996
- "Peachfuzz / Gasface Refill", a 1990 song by KMD
- "Peach Fuzz", a 1964 instrumental by The Ventures
- "Peach Fuzz", a 2018 song by Tyler, the Creator
- "Peachfuzz", the wolf mask used by Josef, the main character from the horror franchise Creep.

== See also ==
- Peach
- Peter Peachfuzz, a cartoon character in Rocky and Bullwinkle
