= Sag Harbor (song) =

2025 song by Tyler, the Creator

- Single cover artwork

Single by Tyler, the Creator
- Released: December 25, 2025 (YouTube); June 22, 2026 (streaming)
- Genre: Jazz rap
- Length: 3:41
- Label: Columbia
- Songwriters: Tyler Okonma; Michael Stokes
- Producers: Tyler, the Creator

Tyler, the Creator singles chronology
"Sugar on My Tongue" (2025)	"Sag Harbor" (2025)	"Look Like My Mama" (2026)

Music video
- "Sag Harbor" on YouTube

"Sag Harbor" (stylized in all caps) is a song by American rapper Tyler, the Creator. It was surprise released exclusively on YouTube on December 25, 2025, similar to his earlier single "That Guy" (2024). It was later made available for streaming on June 22, 2026, through distribution from Columbia Records.

Featuring jazz and soul-inspired production with a freestyle performance, Tyler, the Creator flexes his success as a music artist, from a sold-out tour to performing in stadiums, his luxurious purchases, and a comparison of his influential level to some of his own inspirations.

Released with an accompanying music video, its color grading leans into warmth and nostalgia, as it features Tyler, the Creator in a "pastel-and-pretty" look with visuals of luxury yachts and colonial architecture. He concludes the music video with a thankful note to his fans. "Sag Harbor" received positive reviews from music critics, praising Tyler, the Creator's lyrical ability and the music video's structure.

== Background and production ==
Tyler, the Creator's career in 2025 was significant with the continued dominance of Chromakopia (2024), release and success of Don't Tap the Glass (2025), and being crowned Artist of the Year by Apple Music. He had been nominated for six Grammy Awards and starred alongside Timothée Chalamet in the film Marty Supreme (2025), which was released the same day as "Sag Harbor".

Tyler, the Creator had previously uploaded freestyle tracks during the interim between Flower Boy (2017) and Igor (2019), releasing "435", "Gelato", "Peach Fuzz", "Bronco", and "Potato Salad", with the latter featuring ASAP Rocky. On Christmas Day in 2024, he released "That Guy", a remix to Kendrick Lamar's song "Hey Now" (2024).

With a running time of three minutes and forty-one seconds, "Sag Harbor" was written, produced, and recorded by Tyler, the Creator, with writing credits from Michael Stokes. The song was also mastered by Mike Bozzi and mixed by NealHPogue, with the latter assisted by Zachary Acosta. Through an Instagram story from Tyler, the Creator, he revealed that "Sag Harbor" was influenced by Kanye West's "Late" and Jay-Z's "Dear Summer" (both 2005).

== Music and lyrics ==
Joyce Li of Hypebeast considered "Sag Harbor" to highlight Tyler, the Creator's lyrical agility "over a sophisticated, jazz-inflected soulful production". Quincy of Ratings Game Music considered its instrumental to be a smooth and polished sound that feels "effortless but intentional", creating a space between Tyler, the Creator's melodic parts and "gritty rap sections." His singing comes "through slightly strained yet expressive", while his rapping is "raw" and "focused". Billboard writer Michael Saponara imaged his lyrical style as "delivering one bristling punchline after the next, like a thousand-point weight was lifted off Tyler's chest."

With a sample of Cobra Heart Band's "Cobra Heart", the song is described as a reflective freestyle track with a soul-sampled beat. Lyrically, "Sag Harbor" emphasizes Tyler, the Creator's success with flexing and "witty, self-aware humor", where he boasts his surprise album Don't Tap the Glass being his fourth consecutive number one album, sold out Chromakopia concert tour, and performing in stadiums.

Tyler, the Creator also provides insight about his luxurious purchases and legacy, including a vintage car collection and the expansion of his streetwear brand Golf le Fleur. Reflecting on his impact, he emphasizes that he's on the same influential level as some of his own inspirations, nodding to Clipse as if he's back "grindin' like its '02". He further includes more references, such as the name-dropping of Odd Future members Jasper and Lionel Boyce, SpongeBob SquarePants ("She sponging up my Plankton, it got her moving crabby"), and pop-punk band Blink-182.

== Release and critical reception ==
On December 25, 2025, Tyler, the Creator released "Sag Harbor" exclusively to YouTube without a prior announcement, being his second song to release on Christmas Day following "That Guy". He also promoted the song on an Instagram post with clips of its music video, its lyrics, and photos of Sag Harbor, New York. Additionally, that same day, he uploaded a "freak mix" of "Sugar on My Tongue" (2025), which Tyler, the Creator performed at the Camp Flog Gnaw festival the previous month. On June 22, 2026, "Sag Harbor" was officially released to streaming platforms with distribution from Columbia Records.

Quincy of Ratings Game Music saw "Sag Harbor" as "confident without feeling forced", and said that his rapping "feels raw, focused, and hungry in a way longtime fans will appreciate." Hypebeast writer Joyce Li particularly praised the song's music video, considering it to be a "victory lap in audio-visual form". She explains that Tyler, the Creator's creative output is not based on seasons or cycles, but rather "a continuous stream of consciousness."

== Music video ==
"Sag Harbor" was primarily released as a music video, being exclusively tied to it until its release on streaming platforms. Self-directed by Tyler, the Creator, it is described as representing the spirit of East Coast leisure, with its color grading leaning into warmth and nostalgia. The music video features Tyler, the Creator presented with a "pastel-and-preppy aesthetic against the backdrop of luxury yachts and colonial architecture." It concludes with a title card stating: "What an incredible year, thank you for all the eyes and ears."

== Personnel ==
Credits are adapted from Tidal.

- Tyler Okonma – vocals, writing, production, recording engineer
- Michael Stokes – writing
- Mike Bozzi – mastering engineer
- NealHPogue – mixing engineer
- Zachary Acosta – assistant mixing engineer
