= Juggernaut (song) =

2021 song by Tyler, the Creator featuring Lil Uzi Vert and Pharrell Williams

Song by Tyler, the Creator featuring Lil Uzi Vert and Pharrell Williams

from the album Call Me If You Get Lost
- Released: June 25, 2021
- Recorded: 2021
- Genre: Hip hop
- Length: 2:26
- Label: Columbia
- Songwriters: Tyler Okonma; Symere Woods; Pharrell Williams
- Producers: Tyler, the Creator; Pharrell Williams

Music video
- "Juggernaut" on YouTube

"Juggernaut" is a song by American rapper and producer Tyler, the Creator featuring fellow American rappers Lil Uzi Vert and Pharrell Williams. It was released on June 25, 2021, as a track from Tyler, the Creator's seventh studio album, Call Me If You Get Lost.

== Composition ==
The song contains a reverberating bass in the production and sees Tyler, the Creator boasting about his wealthy lifestyle and clothing line Golf Wang.

Wongo Okon of Uproxx wrote of "Juggernaut", "The track is a bass-knocking number that's equally chaotic and erratic as it is energetic and bouncy. This is thanks in large part raucous placement of the song's drums that provide a unique landscape for the three rappers to lay their bars on."

== Critical reception ==
The song received generally positive reviews. Chris DeVille of Stereogum wrote it "brings the best out of both Lil Uzi Vert and Pharrell, who goes wild in a way I haven't heard since Future's 'Move That Dope'". Luke Morgan Britton of NME called it a "bassy bruiser". Jeff Ihaza of Rolling Stone remarked the song is "a collaboration that makes almost too much sense, and one that might erase memory of the lackluster 'Neon Guts' from Uzi's Luv is Rage 2. It's Tyler in his element, spewing silly but kind of genius bars ('I'm so fuckin deadass I need some Timberlands') and bragging like someone whose known how much they deserve for a very long time. It's not necessarily the best track on Call Me, but it is easily the most fun. Tyler's approach remains as anti-professional as ever. He's done rapping about sexual assault and violence for the sake of shock value, but he's not done ignoring the industry at large. On 'Juggernaut,' we hear how refreshing that feels for his collaborators — both Uzi and Pharrell sound enlivened — and get a sense for the power Tyler, the Creator has harnessed in his decade-long career." Jon Caramanica of The New York Times favorably responded to Pharrell's verse, calling it one of the "startlingly good guest verses from his elders". David Crone of AllMusic commented, "an intergalactic warble colours Uzi's 'JUGGERNAUT' tour-de-force".

== Music video ==
An official music video was directed by Tyler, the Creator (under his alias Wolf Haley) and released alongside the song. It begins with Tyler in a trenchcoat walking through a field of oranges singing the intro, before it shifts to the first verse where a shirtless Tyler dances and moves unnaturally atop a monster truck styled as a Rolls-Royce Cullinan. The truck is being pulled by a clone of himself, that sings Uzi's verse. The camera aims upwards as Tyler falls from the sky singing the chorus. The video ends before Pharrell's verse, where the words "Call Me If You Get Lost" suddenly appear. Lil Uzi Vert and Pharrell Williams do not appear in the video.

== Charts ==
Chart performance for "Juggernaut"
Chart (2021)	Peak position
Australia (ARIA)	49
Canada Hot 100 (Billboard)	30
Global 200 (Billboard)	38
New Zealand (Recorded Music NZ)	36
US Billboard Hot 100	40
US Hot R&B/Hip-Hop Songs (Billboard)	14

== Certifications ==
Region	Certification	Certified units/sales
United States (RIAA)	Gold	500,000^{‡}
^{‡} Sales+streaming figures based on certification alone.
