= Big Poe =

2025 song by Tyler, the Creator featuring Pharrell Williams

Song by Tyler, the Creator with Pharrell Williams

from the album Don't Tap the Glass
- Released: July 21, 2025
- Genre: Hip-hop
- Length: 3:02
- Label: Columbia
- Songwriters: Tyler Okonma; Pharrell Williams; Shye Ben Tzur; Jonathan Greenwood; Trevor Smith; Chad Hugo; Dominick Lamb; Sandy Linzer; Denny Randell; Michael Tyler; Kamaal Fareed; Malik Taylor; Ali Muhammad; Bryan Higgins; James Jackson; Bernard Edwards; Nile Rodgers
- Producers: Tyler, the Creator

"Big Poe" is a song by American rapper Tyler, the Creator. It was released on July 21, 2025, as the opening track from his ninth studio album, Don't Tap the Glass (2025). It features American musician Pharrell Williams, who is also credited as Sk8brd, his old rapper name. Produced by Tyler himself, the song has samples of "Pass the Courvoisier, Part II" by Busta Rhymes featuring P. Diddy and Pharrell and "Roked" by Shye Ben Tzur, Jonny Greenwood of Radiohead, and the Rajasthan Express and "Ring My Bell" by Anita Ward.

The song was positively received upon its release, with some critics praising it as one of the best songs from Don't Tap the Glass. Despite not being released as a single when initially released, the song peaked at number 33 on the Billboard Hot 100, alongside making it onto 7 more charts, its highest position being a peak at number 5 on the Billboard Hot R&B/Hip-Hop Songs chart in the United States of America.

== Composition and lyrics ==
The song introduces a new alter-ego of Tyler, the Creator, Big Poe. It opens with him delivering a set of instructions to the listener: "Number one, body movement / No sitting still / Number two, only speak in glory / Leave your baggage at home / Number three, don't tap the glass". The track then transitions to the sample of "Roked", followed by production consisting of a boom bap beat and synths. Music critics have described the production as evoking the style of Pharrell's early music, namely his album In My Mind and work in N.E.R.D., as well as that of The Bomb Squad. Pharrell raps two verses that boast his luxurious lifestyle. At one point, Tyler addresses his mistrust toward fans regarding his no-cell phone policy in certain events, following with the line "I don't trust white people with dreadlocks". The bridge features a vocal sample of "Pass the Courvoisier, Part II".

== Critical reception ==
The song received generally positive reviews. Billboard's Mackenzie Cummings-Grady ranked it as the fourth best song on Don't Tap the Glass. Zachary Horvath of HotNewHipHop wrote "The mean-mugging instrumental has a confrontational energy to it with its loud and messy drums. The sharp synths (which are all over the album) complement the euphoric feeling the song gives you." Clash's Shahzaib Hussain described the song as "a maelstrom of neon synths, static, and Tyler's insouciant snarl" and the sample of "Pass the Courvoisier, Part II" as "scrubbed-raw, prog-pop sounds bubbling over at the climax."

John Amen of The Line of Best Fit stated: "Ironically, Tyler's cadence brings to mind Blood Sugar Sex Magik-era Anthony Kiedis. The hyperbole is abundant as is the stock machismo which, at this point in hip-hop history, is hard to regard as anything but satirical in tone. Sonically, the piece is thrillingly cacophonous, overflowing with brash synths and aggressive beats." Dash Lewis of Stereogum commented that the "Pass the Courvoisier, Part II" sample "turns the end of 'Big Poe' into a depth charge that's sure to ignite a mosh pit." Mosi Reeves of Rolling Stone commented the song "unfolds like an early Aughts bottles-and-models romp".

Variety's Peter A. Berry described the song as "abrasive and weird" and "emitting all the casual dismissiveness of a rap star who's just refused to sign your Golf Wang shirt." Ludovic Hunter-Tilney of Financial Times wrote the song "grabs our attention with wonderfully chunky beats and a hearty sample from Busta Rhymes's in-the-club anthem 'Pass the Courvoisier, Part II'." He believed the sample's omission of Diddy was "unsurprising but disingenuous", commenting that "Leaving baggage at home should not mean airbrushing the tricky aspects of a sampled track." Alexis Petridis of The Guardian stated "The huge, distorted breakbeat of Big Poe recalls the rhythms produced by the Bomb Squad in their prime, amplified by the stentorian, Chuck D-like tone of Pharrell Williams's guest rap." NME's Niall Smith remarked that Pharrell "materialises like a Y2K phantom, throwing a few animated verses over the Busta Rhymes-flipping beat."

== Commercial performance ==
Upon the song's release, it charted at number 33 on the Billboard Hot 100 and number 5 on the Hot R&B/Hip-Hop Songs chart in the United States, the latter being the song's highest position. Worldwide, the song hit number 42 on the Billboard Global 200, number 43 on the UK singles chart, number 57 on the Canadian Hot 100, number 63 on the ARIA Charts in Australia, number 44 on the Irish Singles Chart, and number 38 on the Official Aotearoa Music Charts in New Zealand.

== Charts ==
Chart performance for "Big Poe"
Chart (2025)	Peak position
Australia (ARIA)	63
Canada Hot 100 (Billboard)	57
Global 200 (Billboard)	42
Ireland (IRMA)	44
New Zealand (Recorded Music NZ)	38
UK Singles (Official Charts)	43
US Billboard Hot 100	33
US Hot R&B/Hip-Hop Songs (Billboard)	5
