= Martians vs. Goblins =

Song by The Game featuring Lil Wayne and Tyler, the Creator

from the album The R.E.D. Album
- Released: December 20, 2011
- Recorded: 2011
- Genre: Alternative hip hop; hardcore hip hop
- Length: 3:48
- Label: DGC; Interscope
- Songwriter(s): Jayceon Taylor; Dwayne Carter; Tyler Okonma; L. Dopson; B. Brown; L. Edwards
- Producer(s): 1500 or Nothin'

"Martians vs. Goblins" is a song by American rapper The Game from his fourth studio album The R.E.D. Album. The song features Young Money's Lil Wayne and Odd Future leader Tyler, the Creator.

== Background ==
In an interview with Vibe.com, Game first announced "Martians vs. Goblins" as a collaboration with Tyler, the Creator.

Oh yeah, Tyler [The Creator] is on the album. I forgot about him. He ain't really doing features for nobody. He feels like, 'fuck everything,' and I don't blame him either. It's a California thing, and I got respect for him and his hustle and what they're doing and just being kids and being rebels for the cause,” Game said of recently befriending the Odd Future frontman. And he respects me for doing what I did for California and the West Coast, I guess. I met him at a Diddy concert and we chopped it up and we got a song called ‘Martians vs Goblins.’ It's dope.

Despite being credited as a featuring artist Lil Wayne only speaks one line, repeatedly, which is sampled from an earlier song featuring Wayne, Party Like A Rockstar (Remix).

== Music video ==
The official music video for the song was announced in a backstage video after a concert of Game and Tyler, the Creator. The video, filmed by Matt Alonzo, was released on December 20, 2011 via Game's Vevo account on YouTube. It features Game and Tyler portraying mental patients. Game is being pushed around in a wheelchair by a nurse as various actors and actresses wail in their cells. At one point, the nurse turns Game towards a room with a glass door containing Tyler, who is holding a cat. The nurse then takes Game to a table where she gives him a lethal injection, seemingly killing him. Before the nurse puts a white sheet over his lifeless face, his eyes briefly open up. The video makes use of many special effects. Lil Wayne does not make an appearance in the video.

== Chart performance ==
"Martians vs. Goblins" debuted at number 100 on the Billboard Hot 100 chart based on digital sales alone. This was the first song to feature Tyler, the Creator that charted on the Hot 100.

Chart (2011)	Peak position
US Billboard Hot 100	100
