= Carlos Morgan =

Canadian R&B–soul singer

- Born: Sept.22, 1967; Toronto, Canada
- Genres: Soul; R&B; jazz; gospel; reggae; hip hop soul
- Occupations: Singer; songwriter; producer
- Labels: D-Tone; Universal Music Canada; Solroc Music

Carlos Morgan is a Canadian singer, songwriter and producer from Toronto, Canada. He is most noted for winning the Juno Award for Best R&B/Soul Recording at the Juno Awards of 1997 for his album Feelin' Alright.

== Musical career ==
Morgan was born in Toronto and performed with local Toronto bands Blue Zone and Lypstick before releasing Feelin' Alright on the independent D-Tone label in 1996. The album received its first significant radio support from Vancouver's CKZZ-FM, which placed singles such as "Give It to You" and "Baby C'mon" into rotation earlier than any other Canadian radio station. Following his Juno Award win, the album was reissued by Universal Music Canada in 1997. In the same year, he won the MuchMusic Video Award for Best Soul/R&B Video, for "Give It to You". In 1998, he won the award for Best R&B Video, again for "Give It to You", at the first Canadian Urban Music Awards.

In 2000 and 2001 he entered the studio to work on his second album, which had the working title We're Gonna Make It. Although he released several singles in this era, he did not release a new album until 2012, when he released The Compilation, a mix of his early 2000s non-album singles and newly recorded material. Justin Kantor of SoulTracks.com recommended the album, saying it "serves as a satisfying round-up of what Carlos Morgan has been up to since disappearing from the mainstream in the late 1990's. The well-rounded repertoire and on-point interpretations demonstrate that he's still got the chops—and are positive signs of what's to come". That same year, he co-wrote the song "Hold My Head Up High" with Quisha Wint. His third album, to be titled Where I've Been, Where I'm Going, is slated for release in 2025.

== Personal life ==
Morgan was born and raised in Toronto, Canada. He attended Wilfrid Laurier University and obtained his master's degree in Community Music. Carlos is the father to one son.
