= Ring Ring Ring =

2025 single by Tyler, the Creator

Single by Tyler, the Creator

from the album Don't Tap the Glass
- Released: July 30, 2025
- Genre: R&B; hip-hop
- Length: 3:22
- Label: Columbia
- Songwriters: Tyler Okonma; Ray Parker Jr.
- Producers: Tyler, the Creator

Tyler, the Creator singles chronology
"Like Him" (2025)	"Ring Ring Ring" (2025)	"Sugar on My Tongue" (2025)

"Ring Ring Ring" is a song by American rapper Tyler, the Creator from his ninth studio album, Don't Tap the Glass (2025). Written and produced by Tyler himself, it contains a sample of "All in the Way You Get Down" by Ray Parker, Jr. and Raydio. The R&B and hip-hop song was sent to U.S. rhythmic radio on July 30, 2025, as the lead single from the album.

Upon the release of Don't Tap the Glass, the song was received positively by music critics. Commercially, the song peaked at number 44 on the Billboard Hot 100 and charted within the top 10 of both the Hot R&B/Hip-Hop Songs chart in the United States and the New Zealand Hot Singles chart.

== Composition ==
The song combines elements of pop, R&B, old-school music, disco and funk, particularly styles from the late 1970s and early 1980s. The song uses a bassline sampled from "All in the Way You Get Down" by Ray Parker, Jr., synthetic strings, electric keys, whip sound effects and percussion layered with a sample of a phone ringing. Tyler, the Creator sings most of the song, in a falsetto similar to that of his album Igor. In a tongue-in-cheek attitude, he depicts himself attempting to connect with his lover on the phone, longing for her to answer his call and being held back by his apprehension about forming a relationship.

== Critical reception ==
The song received generally positive reviews. Mackenzie Cummings-Grady of Billboard ranked it as the fifth best song on Don't Tap the Glass, writing that "Tyler effortlessly glides along here" and "It's sleek and smooth and unbelievably catchy." Shahzaib Hussain of Clash wrote "The avant-funk of 'Ring Ring Ring' is perhaps the most decadently smooth Tyler has ever sounded on record; the light, nimble, hooky track a highlight in a collection that feels more like a scrappy compilation of retro-futurist cuts, than a unified album." Gabriel Bras Nevares of HotNewHipHop commented "'Ring Ring Ring' goes down particularly smoothly thanks to how the soft singing compliments the airy and charming instrumental". Pitchfork's Stephen Kearse described Tyler, the Creator as "lovestruck and dewy-eyed like a Motown singer", adding "The disco strings and electric key melodies up the yearning, retro feel." Melodic's Taylor Swinton stated "It's a track made for movement, but also for reflection, evoking the feel of an afternoon drive to the beach." Reviewing the album for NME, Niall Smith considered the song among the "real show-stealers." Paul Attard of Slant Magazine responded less favorably, commenting "Even the rare attempts at introspection feel phoned-in, dulled by vague abstraction: 'I had to protect my heart/And build the wall so tall, I couldn't look over,' Tyler croons on 'Ring Ring Ring.' It's a line that plays more like a motivational caption than a confessional."

== Charts ==
=== Weekly charts ===
Weekly chart performance for "Ring Ring Ring"
Chart (2025–2026)	Peak position
Australia (ARIA)	64
Canada Hot 100 (Billboard)	58
Central America Anglo Airplay (Monitor Latino)	7
Colombia Anglo Airplay (Monitor Latino)	12
Costa Rica Anglo Airplay (Monitor Latino)	3
Dominican Republic Anglo Airplay (Monitor Latino)	17
Global 200 (Billboard)	53
Ireland (IRMA)	56
Japan Hot Overseas (Billboard Japan)	15
New Zealand Hot Singles (RMNZ)	5
Portugal (AFP)	165
UK Singles (Official Charts)	62
UK Hip Hop/R&B (Official Charts)	14
US Billboard Hot 100	44
US Hot R&B/Hip-Hop Songs (Billboard)	10
US Rhythmic Airplay (Billboard)	7

=== Year-end charts ===
Year-end chart performance for "Ring Ring Ring"
Chart (2025)	Position
US Hot R&B/Hip-Hop Songs (Billboard)	68

== Certifications ==
Certifications
Region	Certification	Certified units/sales
United States (RIAA)	Gold	500,000^{‡}
^{‡} Sales+streaming figures based on certification alone.

== Release history ==
"Ring Ring Ring" release history
Region	Date	Format	Label	Ref.
United States	July 30, 2025	Rhythmic contemporary radio	Columbia	
