= Sugar on My Tongue =

2025 song by Tyler, the Creator

Single by Tyler, the Creator

from the album Don't Tap the Glass
- Released: August 19, 2025
- Genre: Hip-hop; electro; dance-pop
- Length: 2:33
- Label: Columbia
- Songwriter: Tyler Okonma
- Producers: Tyler, the Creator

Tyler, the Creator singles chronology
"Ring Ring Ring" (2025)	"Sugar on My Tongue" (2025)	"Sag Harbor" (2025)

Music video
- "Sugar on My Tongue" on YouTube

"Sugar on My Tongue" is a song by American rapper Tyler, the Creator. It was sent to US rhythmic radio on August 19, 2025, as the second single from his ninth studio album, Don't Tap the Glass (2025). The track is a hip-hop and electro song, and was written and produced by Tyler himself. Upon its release, the song was received positively by music critics and became viral on social media. The song was also successful commercially, charting at number 41 on the Billboard Hot 100. A music video was released on August 12, 2025, and an alternative intro variant was released on December 25, 2025.

== Composition and lyrics ==
"Sugar on My Tongue" is an electro-influenced song that incorporates Italo disco, post-disco and funk elements. The production consists of synthesizers drums and 808s. Tyler, the Creator adopts the "run-on flow" that is widely used in modern hip-hop and raps about oral sex.

== Critical reception ==
The song received generally positive reviews. Mackenzie Cummings-Grady of Billboard ranked it as the second best song on Don't Tap the Glass, writing "The song's intergalactic synths and rumbling 808s make it poised to dominate summertime gatherings, and Tyler offers some truly freaky bars to match the vibe. 'Sugar on My Tongue' is exuberant, and most importantly, fun." Zachary Horvath of HotNewHipHop stated "'Sugar On My Tongue' is a favorite of ours and if you press play down below, it's not hard to see why. The groovy, electro-hop bassline feels part nostalgic and part modern with its shimmering synthy key hits." Clash's Shahzaib Hussain commented that "Tyler harnesses tantric post-disco energy on 'Sugar On My Tongue'". John Amen of The Line of Best Fit described the song as "fuzzy, loud, and raucous, as Tyler offers one of his more deliberately paced raps, occasionally recalling Butterfly-era Kendrick Lamar." Consequence's Kiana Fitzgerald wrote "Despite the carnal (read: horny-as-hell) 'Sugar on My Tongue,' the production sounds brutal and punishing, not unlike the beats we heard on Tyler's 2015 album Cherry Bomb." Pitchfork's Stephen Kearse commented "He's a randy funkateer on 'Sugar on My Tongue,' happily munching box over shimmering synths and a springy kickdrum. 'Don't need no air, I stay down there till I fade,' he vows, ad-libbing a theatrical 'Girl I'm dead' for extra horny oomph."

== Music video ==
Still from the music video for "Sugar on My Tongue", featuring Tyler and a female love interest in BDSM inspired outfits

The music video for "Sugar on My Tongue", directed by Tyler himself, was released on August 12, 2025. The video begins with Tyler and a woman in an empty room, covered in white bathroom tiles. He begins talking to her, rapping the song's first verse in an attempt to win her over. As Tyler raps "Tell your mama / Tell your daddy / Tell the bitches that you know / What you heard about me", her parents and friends appear out of thin air. When the song's chorus starts, a rave breaks out, featuring a group of extras dancing. The visuals for the second verse lean into BDSM culture, as Tyler wears a black latex suit, with a whip being attached to his neck as if it were a leash, which is pulled on by his love interest. A mask covers his eyes and nose, leaving only his mouth visible. The woman also appears in BDSM inspired clothing, wearing thigh-high leather boots. The more sexual attire is reflected by the reappearance of the woman's parents, as well as the extras that appear during the repeat of the chorus. By the third verse, Tyler and the woman are naked. As his craving for her grows stronger, Tyler takes a knife and cuts his tongue off. The tongue, bloodied, falls to the floor. The woman takes a watering can and begins to water his tongue, which grows to immense size. She then jumps on top of the tongue and begins to ride it. The video cuts to a black screen for the last ten seconds.

The music video received generally positive reception. For Rap-Up, Malcolm Trapp wrote that the video was "easily one of the most creative visuals we've gotten so far from the rapper's latest project". Aaron Williams of Uproxx called it "a wild ride that really leans into the yearning of a fresh crush, the dance aspirations of Tyler's Don't Tap The Glass album, and his weirder surrealistic impulses." He noted similarities between the video's setting and the 2024 film The Substance, drawing comparisons between the bathrooms in both.

== Live performances ==
Tyler, the Creator performed this song alongside "Thought I Was Dead" at the 68th Annual Grammy Awards. The performance of the song features his "Big Poe" persona getting his signature car checked out by an auto-mechanic (played by actress Regina King), who imparts him with some words of wisdom before sending on his way; only for "Big Poe" to accidentally run over Tyler's "St. Chroma" persona (an effect achieved through the means of a body double). He then proceeds to dance around the nearby gas station and flirt with a girl as paramedics and local law enforcement arrive on scene, leading "Big Poe" to ultimately decide to kill himself by hiding in and blowing up the gas station in an attempt to evade capture.

At Camp Flog Gnaw 2025, he performed the song with an extended intro, which was later uploaded to YouTube on Christmas day.

== Commercial performance ==
In the United States, the song charted at number 41 on the Billboard Hot 100 and peaked at number 9 on the Hot R&B/Hip-Hop Songs chart. In Australia, the song peaked at number 19 on the ARIA Charts. In Canada, the song charted at number 39 on the Canadian Hot 100. In Ireland, the song peaked at number 31 on the Irish Singles Chart. The song also charted at number 29 on the Billboard Global 200. In Latvia, the song peaked at number 6 on the Latvia Streaming chart. In New Zealand, the song reached number 27 on the singles chart. Meanwhile, in Poland, the song charted at number 29 on the Polish Streaming Top 100. In the United Kingdom, the song peaked at number 27 on the UK singles chart.

== Accolades ==
Accolades received by "Sugar on My Tongue"
Organization	Year	Category	Result	Ref(s).
MTV Video Music Awards	2026	Best Hip-Hop	Nominated	

== Charts ==
=== Weekly charts ===
Weekly chart performance
Chart (2025–2026)	Peak position
Australia (ARIA)	19
Australia Hip Hop/R&B (ARIA)	2
Austria (Ö3 Austria Top 40)	56
Canada Hot 100 (Billboard)	39
Colombia Anglo Airplay (Monitor Latino)	12
Costa Rica Airplay (Monitor Latino)	13
Czech Republic Singles Digital (ČNS IFPI)	59
Ecuador Anglo Airplay (Monitor Latino)	11
El Salvador Anglo Airplay (Monitor Latino)	1
Global 200 (Billboard)	29
Greece International (IFPI)	23
Ireland (IRMA)	31
Latvia Streaming (LaIPA)	6
Lithuania (AGATA)	5
Mexico Anglo Airplay (Monitor Latino)	9
Netherlands (Single Top 100)	87
New Zealand (Recorded Music NZ)	27
Norway (VG-lista)	92
Peru Anglo Airplay (Monitor Latino)	2
Philippines Hot 100 (Billboard Philippines)	46
Poland Airplay (OLiS)	47
Poland Streaming (OLiS)	29
Portugal (AFP)	121
Slovakia Airplay (ČNS IFPI)	29
Slovakia Singles Digital (ČNS IFPI)	36
Sweden Heatseeker (Sverigetopplistan)	10
Switzerland (Schweizer Hitparade)	59
Turkey International Airplay (Radiomonitor Türkiye)	1
UK Singles (Official Charts)	27
US Billboard Hot 100	41
US Hot R&B/Hip-Hop Songs (Billboard)	7
US Pop Airplay (Billboard)	19
US Rhythmic Airplay (Billboard)	1

=== Monthly charts ===
Monthly chart performance
Chart (2025)	Peak position
Lithuania Airplay (TopHit)	58

=== Year-end charts ===
Year-end chart performance
Chart (2025)	Position
US Hot R&B/Hip-Hop Songs (Billboard)	47

== Certifications ==
Certifications
Region	Certification	Certified units/sales
Australia (ARIA)	Platinum	70,000^{‡}
Canada (Music Canada)	Platinum	80,000^{‡}
Mexico (AMPROFON)	Gold	70,000^{‡}
New Zealand (RMNZ)	Gold	15,000^{‡}
Poland (ZPAV)	Gold	62,500^{‡}
United Kingdom (BPI)	Silver	200,000^{‡}
United States (RIAA)	Platinum	1,000,000^{‡}
^{‡} Sales+streaming figures based on certification alone.

== Release history ==
Release dates and formats
Region	Date	Format(s)	Labels	Ref.
United States	August 19, 2025	Rhythmic contemporary radio	Columbia	
United States	September 29, 2025	Contemporary hit radio	Columbia	
