= Madison McFerrin =

American singer-songwriter

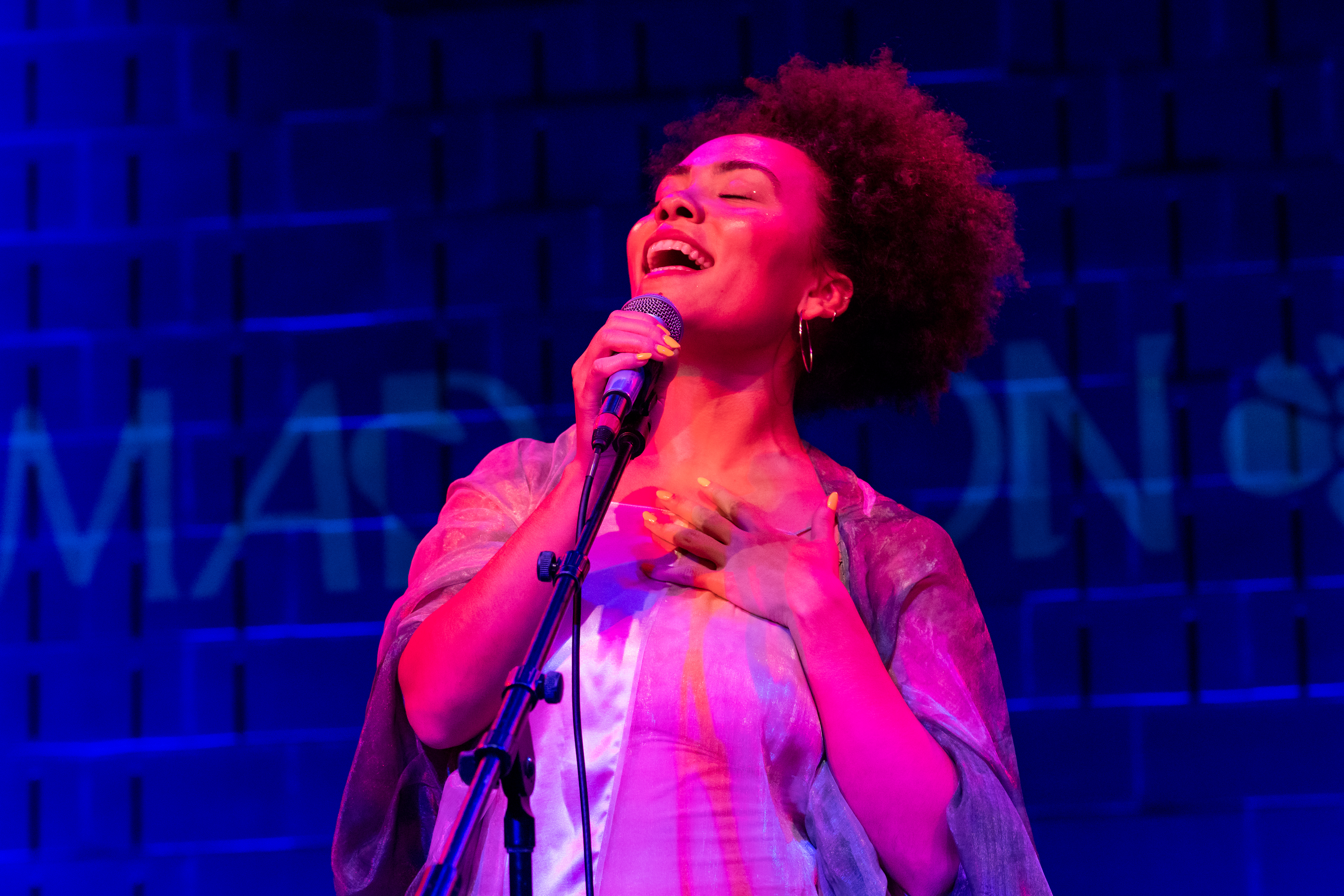
- Born: Madison McFerrin; November 5, 1991 (age 35)
- Education: Berklee College of Music
- Occupations: Singer; songwriter
- Years active: 2016–present
- Spouse: Jacy Cunningham (m. 2025)
- Parents: Bobby McFerrin (father); Debbie Green (mother)
- Relatives: Taylor McFerrin (brother); Jevon McFerrin (brother); Robert McFerrin (grandfather)
- Musical career
- Origin: Brooklyn, New York, U.S.
- Instrument: Vocals
- Label: MadMcFerrin Music
- Website: madisonmcferrin.com

Madison McFerrin (born November 5, 1991) is an American singer-songwriter. Her debut album, I Hope You Can Forgive Me (2023), was released independently. She released her follow-up album Scorpio on June 24, 2025, and recently collaborated with Tyler, The Creator on his song "Don't You Worry Baby."

== Early life and education ==
Madison McFerrin was born in San Francisco, California, to jazz vocalist and classical conductor Bobby McFerrin, and Debbie Green. Her siblings include two brothers, musician Taylor McFerrin, and actor Jevon McFerrin. Her paternal grandfather was operatic baritone Robert Keith McFerrin, Sr., the first black man to sing at the Metropolitan Opera in New York City. She is a graduate of Berklee College of Music.

== Musical career ==
McFerrin's first release was in 2016, an EP titled Finding Foundations, Vol. 1, containing three tracks. In 2023 Variety announced, "Madison McFerrin has established herself in the new school of soul with three EPs and multiple singles throughout her independent career." Raina Douris from the National Public Radio described that the artist creates "expansive, atmospheric grooves that grow and bloom, layer by layer."

McFerrin released her single, "(Please Don't) Leave Me Now" on February 22, 2023, referring to a near-death experience in her life. On the same day she announced her debut studio album, I Hope You Can Forgive Me, issued on May 12, 2023. A music video was released for "(Please Don't) Leave Me Now", and The Fader named the song a "transition from the moody clubs and onto a grander stage". McFerrin deejayed under the moniker of Melismata Mama at a celebration of rising women's voices hosted by Rolling Stone and Bumble in spring 2023.

Rolling Stone magazine included McFerrin's "Run" in its Top 100 songs of 2023, citing the effort as "perhaps the most compelling story" of the list, based upon McFerrin's discovery that her great-great-great-grandmother had fled to escape enslavement. On the track she encourages her ancestors that yes, running will be worth it; her father Bobby McFerrin accompanied her on vocals.

McFerrin's single, "GUILTY" was recorded in 2021 in response to the conviction of former Minnesota police officer Derek Chauvin for the murder of George Floyd.

She appeared on Tyler, the Creator's Don't Tap the Glass album on the track "Don't You Worry Baby".

== Discography ==
Madison McFerrin discography
- Studio albums: 2
- EPs: 4
- Singles: 6

=== Studio albums ===
List of studio albums, with selected details
| Title | Details |
|---|---|
| I Hope You Can Forgive Me | Released: May 12, 2023; Label: MadMcFerrin Music; Format: cassette, digital download, streaming, vinyl LP |
| Scorpio | Released: June 24, 2025; Label: MadMcFerrin Music; Format: digital download, streaming |

=== Extended plays ===
List of extended plays, with selected details
| Title | Details |
|---|---|
| Finding Foundations, Vol. I | Released: July 9, 2021; Label: MadMcFerrin Music; Format: Digital download, streaming |
| Finding Foundations, Vol. II | Released: July 9, 2021; Label: MadMcFerrin Music; Format: Digital download, streaming |
| You + I | Released: July 9, 2021; Label: MadMcFerrin Music; Format: Digital download, streaming |

=== Singles ===
List of singles, showing the year released, and album name
| Title | Year | Album |
|---|---|---|
| "Insane" | 2018 | Finding Foundations, Vol. II |
| "Try" | 2019 | You + I |
| "Amethyst" | 2020 | —N/a |
| "Hindsight" | 2020 | —N/a |
| "Guilty" | 2021 | —N/a |
| "Over the Ocean" | 2021 | —N/a |
| "Dream" | 2021 | —N/a |
| "Stay Away (From Me)" | 2022 | I Hope You Can Forgive Me |
| "(Please Don't) Leave Me Now" | 2023 | I Hope You Can Forgive Me |

== Filmography ==
=== Anime ===
| Year | Title | Role | Notes |
|---|---|---|---|
| 2019 | Carole & Tuesday | GGK | Singing voice |

== Tours ==
- I Hope You Can Forgive Me Tour (2023)
