= Music Inspired by Illumination & Dr. Seuss' The Grinch =

EP by Tyler, the Creator
- Released: November 16, 2018
- Recorded: October–November 2018
- Genre: Christmas
- Length: 10:22
- Label: Columbia
- Producer: Tyler, the Creator

Tyler, the Creator chronology
Flower Boy (2017)	Music Inspired by Illumination & Dr. Seuss' The Grinch (2018)	Igor (2019)

Professional ratings
Review scores
Source	Rating
Pitchfork	7.2/10

Music Inspired by Illumination & Dr. Seuss' The Grinch (popularly shortened to The Grinch EP) is an extended play (EP) by the American rapper and producer Tyler, the Creator. It was released by Columbia Records on November 16, 2018, as the accompanying EP to the 2018 animated film The Grinch.

== Background ==
For The Grinch soundtrack, Tyler, the Creator created a new song "I Am the Grinch", and also created a hip hop cover version of the song "You're a Mean One, Mr. Grinch". Tyler commented that "making christmas themed music, but not making it too xmasy was the goal [and] keeping 7 year olds in mind but also wanting the parents to listen also". The EP includes features from Santigold, Ryan Beatty, and Jerry Paper.

== Track listing ==
All music is composed by Tyler, the Creator. All production handled by Tyler, The Creator. Credits adapted from Tidal.

No.	Title	Writer(s)	Length
1.	"Whoville"		1:13
2.	"Lights On" (featuring Ryan Beatty and Santigold)	Santi White; Ryan Beatty	2:29
3.	"Hot Chocolate" (featuring Jerry Paper)	Lucas Nathan; Larry Mizell	2:11
4.	"Big Bag"		1:25
5.	"When Gloves Come Off" (featuring Ryan Beatty)	Beatty	1:53
6.	"Cindy Lou's Wish"		1:06
Total length:			10:22

== Charts ==
Chart (2018)	Peak position
US Top Holiday Albums (Billboard)	34
