= Golf Wang =

American streetwear brand

GOLF WANG
- Type: Private company
- Industry: Fashion, streetwear
- Founded: 2011; 15 years ago
- Founder: Tyler Okonma
- Headquarters: 350 N Fairfax Ave. Los Angeles 35 Howard St. NYC 57-59 Beak St. London, Los Angeles, California, United States
- Key people: Tyler Okonma
- Products: Apparel, footwear, accessories
- Website: www.golfwang.com www.golflefleur.com

Golf Wang is an American street-wear brand established in 2011 by American musician Tyler, the Creator. The name Golf Wang is a spoonerism of his Los Angeles-based musical collective Odd Future Wolf Gang Kill Them All (OFWGKTA) or Odd Future for short, of which he was a co-founder. Golf Wang is known for its colorful visual aesthetic. In 2013, the brand expanded beyond its Odd Future affiliation and established itself in the fashion industry. The brand offers clothing, footwear through collaborations with Converse often under the name GOLF le FLEUR*, jewellery, upon other products. "Holiday 1991", the brand's first lookbook, was released on December 11, 2011.

== Creative expansion ==
=== Split from Odd Future ===
Golf Wang was still affiliated with Odd Future, during its December 2011 debut. In 2013, Golf Wang publicly separated from Odd Future.

=== Collaborations ===
In its history, Golf Wang has gone on to collaborate with other brands as a part of various projects. Golf Wang's first notable collaboration was its project with Vans. The partnership lasted from 2013 to 2016. In an interview with Dazed Magazine in 2017, Tyler stated that Golf Wang cut ties with Vans due to a lack of creative liberty. Following Golf Wang's departure from Vans, Tyler, the Creator and Converse collaborated to create the shoe collection GOLF le FLEUR*. In 2017, Golf Wang collaborated with Japanese sandal brand SUICOKE. Their first release was the KAW-CAB sandals in colors 'Mocha' and 'Lemon Yellow'. In April 2019, they released a third version of the KAW-CAB sandals. Then in October 2019, a different silhouette called the 'DEPA-CAB' sandals was released in two new colorways. Also in 2019, GOLF le FLEUR* and Converse released a new, original silhouette named the 'GLF Giano Ox'. The shoes were available in two colorways, 'Bright Concord' and 'Cuban Sand'. That same year, GOLF WANG created a scented candle in collaboration with Japanese fragrance label "reta W". Named 'Coldwater', the candle was released on March 23, 2019. For apparel, Golf le Fleur partnered with fashion brand Lacoste for an SS19 collection named 'GOLF le COSTE*'. The clothing line featured colors such as pale pink, beige, and off-white named respectively 'litchi', 'geode', and 'mascarpone'. Golf le Fleur then collaborated with Jeni's Splendid Ice Creams. The first ice cream was named 'Snowflake', released on July 8, 2019, it was a white chocolate ice cream flavor. The second flavor, 'Pluto Bleu' was released online on September 17, 2020, and was a blood orange and blueberry flavored ice cream. On May 20, 2020, Golf Wang released a top and bottom set with Levi Strauss & Co. for their '501 day'. The collaboration featured Levi's vintage-fit trucker jacket and 501 '93 jeans in Ecru denim with rainbow-colored polka dots.

=== GOLF le FLEUR* ===
Golf le Fleur was introduced at the Golf Wang fashion show at Made L.A. on June 11, 2016. Named "Golf le Fleur" (stylized as "GOLF le FLEUR*"), it was first introduced as a shoe collaboration between Tyler, the Creator and Converse. The collection was named "GOLF le FLEUR*" to mean Flower Boy in French though the translation is inaccurate. It was released in the same year as Tyler's Flower Boy album. First made available to the public on July 13, 2017, the first design released was Converse One Star shoes in a new, light blue colorway called "Clearwater".

As of December 2021, Golf le FLEUR* has branched away from Golf Wang into a standalone luxury lifestyle and apparel brand debuting with an invite-only pop-up shop in Los Angeles.

On August 3, 2017, the first set of Golf le Fleurs was released. They came in 4 colors, called "Airway Blue" (light blue), "Peach Pearl" (peach colored), "Sulfur" (yellow) and "Fuchsia Glow" (fuchsia/lavender).

On October 16, 2017, the second set of Golf le Fleurs was announced. This set was named the "Uno", which contained three new shoes with a brand-new insole, design, and bottom. The colors Jolly Green (forest green), Vanilla (cream), and Solar Power (yellow), were released on November 2, 2017.

On January 4, 2018, the second set of "Anas", and the third overall set of Golf le Fleurs were announced. They were released on January 18, 2018, with the colors "Bachelor Blue" (light blue), "Geranium Pink" (light pink), and "Jade Lime" (light green).

On April 23, 2018, the first set of the line known as "Momos", and the fourth overall set of Golf le Fleurs were announced. They are a monotone colored shoe, and on April 26, 2018, they were released. The colors were "Black", "White", "Greener Pastures" (dark green), "Limoges" (dark blue), and "Rhubarb" (burgundy).

On May 23, the third set of "Anas", (also nicknamed "two-toned") and the fifth overall set of Golf le Fleurs were announced. They were released on June 1, 2018, with the colors "Purple Heart" (purple and green), "Molten Lava" (red and blue), "Candy Pink" (red and pink), and "Plume" (baby blue and baby pink).

On February 23, 2019, the "Industrial" line was released with another rework of the Converse (shoe company) "One Star". The shoes were released with barely blue/egret/black and barely blue/patriot/egret colorways. The line also included matching '60s workwear boilersuits.

On May 17, the "Velvet le Fleur" line was released. This included two reworks of the "One Star" in red and brown as well as a rework of the "Chuck 70" in purple, all of which use a quilted velvet material.

On June 28, another pair of "Anas" was released, featuring a bright rainbow sole and an all-white upper.

On September 13, a pair of Converse All-Stars was released with a polka dot design.

On December 3, 2025, Tyler, the Creator went to Instagram to share that he was ending collections for Le Fleur*, with Season 4 being the final collection. The brand is not completely shutting down, however, as they will continue to sell fragrances, accessories, and other collaborations.

== Fashion shows ==
Golf Wang made its runway debut on June 11, 2016, at Made LA, a fashion event created by IMG. 2016 was the premiere of Made LA on the west coast. The show also marked the debut of the 'Golf le Fleur' shoe collaboration, with Converse and Vans. In addition to a live audience, the show was broadcast on the internet. Notable attendees included Kanye West, Dylan and Cole Sprouse, Kendall Jenner, YG, Janelle Monáe, Solange Knowles, and Amandla Stenberg.

The show implemented a "see-now, buy-now" process at the event, meaning that the collection was available for pre-order after the show. The show's set design included a bedroom connected to a skate ramp and the event was accompanied by musical performances.

== Flagship stores ==
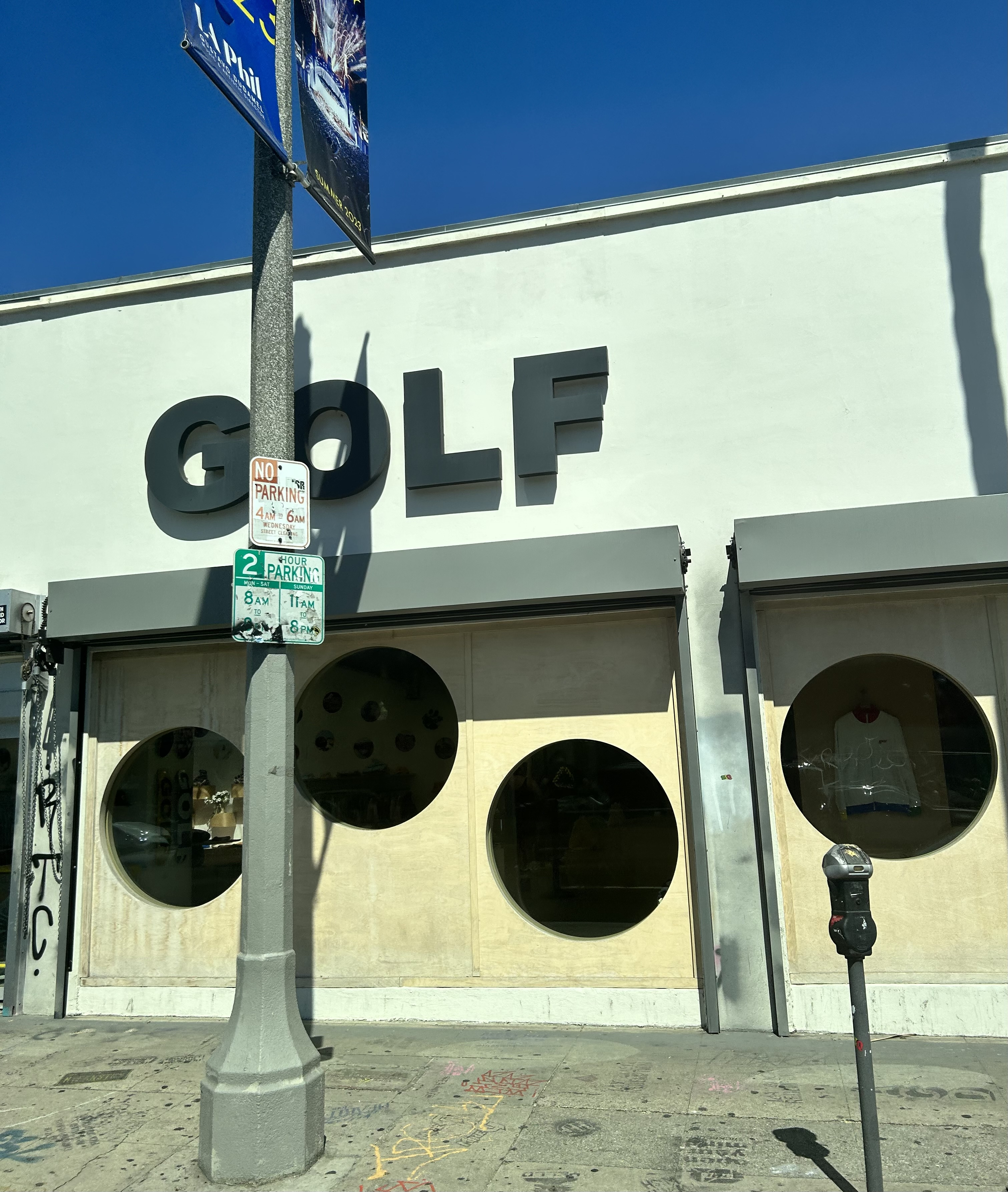
The front of the Golf Wang store in Los Angeles

The first Odd Future store was opened on Fairfax Avenue in 2011. The Odd Future would come to be the first retail space that sold Golf Wang. In 2014, Tyler described in a series of tweets that the Odd Future store on Fairfax Avenue had closed. On October 25, 2017, Tyler announced that he would open the Golf Wang flagship, named "GOLF" on 350 North Fairfax Avenue in Los Angeles, California. The new location officially opened on October 26, 2017, and features an indoor skating bowl. A second "GOLF" storefront opened on November 12, 2022, located on 35 Howard Street in New York, NYC. The third "GOLF" storefront then opened in London's SOHO district on October 21, 2023, becoming the first store to open outside of the United States launching their "GOLF ACROSS THE POND" limited time campaign. Finally, the fourth and most recent "GOLF" store opened in the suburb of Darlinghurst in Sydney, Australia on August 29, 2025, marking the brand's first physical foray into the southern hemisphere, complete with an exclusive range of t-shirts with koala and kangaroo graphics. Tyler held meet and greets at all stores upon their opening.
