= Sweet / I Thought You Wanted to Dance =

2021 song by Tyler, the Creator featuring Brent Faiyaz and Fana Hues

Song by Tyler, the Creator featuring Brent Faiyaz and Fana Hues

from the album Call Me If You Get Lost
- Released: June 25, 2021
- Recorded: 2017–2021
- Genre: Synth-pop; R&B; reggae
- Length: 9:48
- Label: Columbia
- Songwriters: Tyler Okonma; Christopher Wood; Fana Hughes; Fil Callender
- Producers: Tyler, the Creator

"Sweet / I Thought You Wanted to Dance" (stylized in all caps) is a song by the American rapper and producer Tyler, the Creator, released on June 25, 2021, from his seventh studio album Call Me If You Get Lost (2021). It features the American singers Brent Faiyaz and Fana Hues. The song contains samples of "Is Anyone There?" by Hookfoot; and "Baby My Love", by The In Crowd and Jah Stitch.

== Background ==
On his fifth studio album Flower Boy (2017), Tyler revealed an early version of "Sweet" titled "Sugar", which was included on the song "I Ain't Got Time!" before being included on Call Me If You Get Lost almost four years later. The opening instrumental was first heard in the announcement trailer for the album titled "Side Street", which features Tyler kissing a girl but quickly leaves as her boyfriend appears. However, when questioned on who the guy is, the girl dismisses it. The boyfriend is played by Tyler's close friend and Odd Future member, Taco Bennett.

The song is also a continuation of a recurring theme with in Tyler's projects where the 10th track is a multi-part song. This can be displayed in his debut studio album Bastard with the songs "VCR / Wheels", his sophomore album Goblin with the songs "Fish / Boppin' Bitch", his third album Wolf with the 3 part songs "PartyIsntOver / Campfire / Bimmer" featuring Lætitia Sadier and Frank Ocean, his 2015 album Cherry Bomb with albums lead single "Fucking Young / Perfect" featuring Kali Uchis, his 2017 album Flower Boy with the single "911 / Mr. Lonely" featuring Frank Ocean and Steve Lacy, and his 2019 Grammy-winning album Igor with the song "Gone, Gone / Thank You". The only times Tyler has deviated from this was for the 2012 Odd Future album The OF Tape Vol. 2 with the song "Analog 2 / Wheels 2" with Frank Ocean and Syd being the 7th track, the tradition was broken on Chromakopia with the 10th track "Tomorrow" not having a second part, but it returned on Don't Tap the Glass with the song "Don't Tap That Glass / Tweakin'" being the 7th track.

== Composition and lyrics ==
The track follows a recurring theme in the tenth track of Tyler's albums, being a two part track, with the first part, "Sweet", and "I Thought You Wanted to Dance", the second part. "Sweet"—which lasts for four minutes—is in the style of synth-pop and R&B, featuring synthesizers that "loop and swirl", with its lyrics having Tyler daydream about his romantic interest.

Towards the middle of the song, the beat switches to the second part of the track, "I Thought You Wanted to Dance", which lasts for five minutes and has a reggae and dancehall style, and its lyrics deal with his feelings of heartbreak and regret. Both parts of the song also incorporate elements of soft funk.

== Commercial performance ==
Following the release of Call Me If You Get Lost, "Sweet / I Thought You Wanted to Dance" charted at number 60 on the US Billboard Hot 100 on the issue dated July 7, 2021.

== Charts ==
Chart performance for "Sweet / I Thought You Wanted to Dance"
Chart (2021)	Peak position
Australia (ARIA)	69
Canada Hot 100 (Billboard)	61
Global 200 (Billboard)	62
US Billboard Hot 100	60
US Hot R&B/Hip-Hop Songs (Billboard)	27

== Certifications ==
Region	Certification	Certified units/sales
New Zealand (RMNZ)	Platinum	30,000^{‡}
United States (RIAA)	Platinum	1,000,000^{‡}
^{‡} Sales+streaming figures based on certification alone.
