= Dream Girl (album) =

Studio album by Anna of the North
- Released: 25 October 2019
- Length: 41:51
- Label: Honeymoon

Anna of the North chronology
Lovers (2017)	Dream Girl (2019)	Believe (2020)

Singles from Dream Girl
- 1. "Leaning On Myself" Released: 6 February 2019; 2. "Used to Be" Released: 10 April 2019; 3. "Thank Me Later" Released: 12 June 2019; 4. "Playing Games" Released: 16 August 2019; 5. "Dream Girl" Released: 18 September 2019

Professional ratings
Review scores
Source	Rating
DIY	3.5/5 stars
Mojo	4/5 stars
Classic Pop	8/10 stars

Dream Girl is the second studio album by Norwegian singer Anna of the North, released on 25 October 2019 by Honeymoon Records. The project follows her 2017 album, Lovers, as well as features on Tyler, the Creator's singles, "Boredom", and "911 / Mr. Lonely".

== Track listing ==
Dream Girl track listing
No.	Title	Writer(s)	Producer(s)	Length
1.	"Dream Girl"	Anna Lotterud; Barnie Lister; Josh Record	Patrick Wimberly	2:31
2.	"Leaning On Myself"	Lotterud; Tommy Schleiter; Jakob Bjorn Hansen; Nick Long	Tommy English; Hansen	3:17
3.	"Time to Get Over It"	Lotterud; Bastian Langebæk; Thomas Havelock	Henrik Haraldsen Sveen	2:52
4.	"My Love"	Lotterud; Joel Pott	Wimberly	3:41
5.	"Lonely Life"	Lotterud; Langebæk; Havelock	Wimberly	3:39
6.	"Interlude"	Lotterud; Askjell Solstrand	Solstrand	1:12
7.	"Thank Me Later"	Lotterud; Langebæk; Havelock	Sveen; Benjamin Miller	3:24
8.	"Used to Be"	Lotterud; Langebæk; Havelock	Langebæk	3:48
9.	"What We Do"	Lotterud; Langebæk; Havelock	Luke Smith	4:10
10.	"Playing Games"	Lotterud; Lister; Record	Lister; Sveen	3:23
11.	"When R U Coming Home"	Lotterud; Jem Cooke; Ant Whiting	Wimberly; Whiting	3:37
12.	"Reasons" (featuring Charlie Skien)	Lotterud; Andreas Høvset; Solstrand	Solstrand	2:53
13.	"If U Wanna"	Lotterud; Sivert Hjeltnes Hagtvet; Viljar Losnegård	Hagtvet; Losnegård	3:17
Total length:				41:51
