= I Ain't Got Time! =

2017 single by Tyler, the Creator

Single by Tyler, the Creator

from the album Flower Boy
- Released: July 19, 2017
- Recorded: 2016–2017
- Genre: Hip hop
- Length: 3:26
- Label: Columbia
- Songwriter: Tyler Okonma
- Producer: Tyler, the Creator

Tyler, the Creator singles chronology
| "Boredom" (2017) | "I Ain't Got Time!" (2017) | "See You Again" (2017) |

"I Ain't Got Time!" is a song by American rapper and producer Tyler, the Creator, released on July 19, 2017, as the third single from his fifth studio album Flower Boy, which was released two days later. It features additional vocals from Shane Powers and incorporates elements of "Introduction" by Bel-Sha-Zaar featuring Tommy Genapopoluis and the Grecian Knights.

== Background ==
On July 9, 2017, Flower Boy was leaked and surfaced online. One particular line in "I Ain't Got Time!" especially caught the attention of fans as it hinted at Tyler, the Creator's sexual orientation: "Next line will have 'em like 'Whoa' / I been kissing white boys since 2004". The song premiered on July 19, 2017, via Zane Lowe's Beats 1, on which Tyler, the Creator revealed he made the song during one of Kanye West's studio sessions for his album The Life of Pablo. When West was taking a nap, his engineer Noah recorded Tyler on an MPC as Tyler had requested. Tyler started smacking, clapping, "making weird noises", added bass and then a hook to the song. He was inspired to sample "Introduction" after hearing "Groove Is in the Heart" by Deee-Lite, which also samples the song. Tyler offered Kanye West to perform on the song, thinking would "sound so much cooler saying 'I ain't got time'", and also contacted Nicki Minaj's management at the time with the same offer for her. According to Tyler, both rappers turned it down; West did not like the song, and Minaj's then-management told him she did not know what to add. In a 2023 episode of her radio show Queen Radio, Minaj was asked by a fan about the song and she said that she liked Tyler's music and she does not remember receiving the song or declining it. According to Tyler, "I Ain't Got Time!" began as two separate tracks which he then joined since he could not decide "which one should go as the banger".

== Composition ==
"I Ain't Got Time!" is a "psychedelic" hip hop song with an uptempo bounce and quick-paced production that contains synthesizers, a thumping bass and drums with a looped sample from "Groove Is in the Heart". The song uses two different variations of the beat and finds Tyler, the Creator rapping in multiple flows. In one verse, he states he has been "kissing white boys since 2004", before addressing his departure from Vans and shoe deal with Converse as well as mentioning "getting neck from a broad". The song ends with an earlier version of "Sweet / I Thought You Wanted to Dance" (titled "Sugar"), later included on his seventh studio album Call Me If You Get Lost in over four years later in June 2021.

== Recording ==
“I Ain’t Got Time!” was recorded during sessions for Tyler, the Creator’s fourth studio album Flower Boy (2017), primarily in Los Angeles. The track was produced by Tyler, the Creator and incorporates a pitched sample of Positive K’s “I Got a Man.” It was developed through Tyler’s experimental production process, in which he built instrumentals first and then layered vocals over evolving arrangements. Recording sessions for ''I Ain't Got Time!'' were recorded between 2016-2017. The song features a notable mid-track shift in tempo and structure, reflecting Tyler’s tendency during the Flower Boy sessions to restructure beats and song sections during recording rather than adhering to traditional song formats.

== Critical reception ==
Alexandra Holterman of Billboard wrote the song is "perhaps made more unique with just Tyler's raspy voice integrated with the titillating barrage of sounds. With or without the added intrigue caused by the leaked lyric, the single so far appears to be a memorable addition to the rapper's fourth studio album". Likewise, Aaron Williams of Uproxx called it an "ugly-face-inducing banger, with or without an explanation for" the aforementioned line. Matthew Ramirez of Pitchfork commented, "Tyler's refusal to make his life an open book keeps him enigmatic, while his production here, a noisy, gurgling bath of synths makes sure the whole song remains unpredictable. Eight years into his career, Tyler's ability to keep offering new perspectives, especially on 'I Ain't Got Time!', shows he's still full of surprises".

== Charts ==
Chart performance for "I Ain't Got Time!"
| Chart (2017) | Peak position |
|---|---|
| New Zealand Heatseeker Singles (RMNZ) | 2 |

== Certifications ==
Certifications for "I Ain't Got Time!"
| Region | Certification | Certified units/sales |
|---|---|---|
| United States (RIAA) | Gold | 500,000^{‡} |
^{‡} Sales+streaming figures based on certification alone.
