= Lust for Life (Lana Del Rey album) =

2017 studio album by Lana Del Rey

Studio album by Lana Del Rey
- Released: July 21, 2017
- Studios: The Green Building (Los Angeles); Hampstead (London); Electric Lady (New York City); Sole (London); Strongroom (London); Record Plant (Los Angeles); The Farm (New York City)
- Genres: Alt-pop; folk; trap-pop
- Length: 72:08
- Labels: Polydor; Interscope
- Producers: Lana Del Rey; Rick Nowels; Kieron Menzies; Dean Reid; Benny Blanco; Boi-1da; Emile Haynie; Tim Larcombe; Sean Ono Lennon; Metro Boomin; Jahaan Sweet

Lana Del Rey chronology
Honeymoon (2015)	Lust for Life (2017)	Norman Fucking Rockwell! (2019)

Singles from Lust for Life
- 1. "Love" Released: February 18, 2017; 2. "Lust for Life" Released: April 19, 2017; 3. "Summer Bummer" Released: July 28, 2017; 4. "Groupie Love" Released: July 28, 2017

Lust for Life is the fifth studio album by American singer-songwriter Lana Del Rey. It was released on July 21, 2017, through Polydor and Interscope Records worldwide and Urban Records in Germany. Marking a return to the "hip-hop inspired" sound of her major-label debut, Lust for Life features production from past collaborators Rick Nowels, Kieron Menzies, and Emile Haynie, while also working for the first time with producers Boi-1da, Max Martin, Benny Blanco, and Metro Boomin. Various guest appearances like the Weeknd, ASAP Rocky, Stevie Nicks, Sean Lennon, and Playboi Carti featured on the album.

Lust for Life received positive reviews from music critics and a nomination for the Grammy Award for Best Pop Vocal Album at the 60th Annual ceremony—becoming Del Rey's second nomination in the category. It also appeared on the 2017 year-end best-albums lists from various publications. The album was a global success, topping the charts in twelve countries including the United Kingdom, and the United States, while reaching the top five in fifteen territories.

The album was promoted by the release of four singles. The lead single, "Love" was released to critical acclaim and moderate success, peaking at number 44 on the US Billboard Hot 100, while the title track, featuring the Weeknd, peaked at number 64. "Summer Bummer" featuring ASAP Rocky and Playboi Carti; and "Groupie Love" also featuring ASAP Rocky were released as the third and fourth singles in the United Kingdom and Italy respectively. Del Rey embarked on her fourth headlining concert tour, entitled LA to the Moon Tour, which commenced on January 5, 2018, and concluded on August 10, 2018.

== Background and release ==
Del Rey first discussed the follow-up album to her fourth studio album, Honeymoon (2015), during an interview with NME magazine in December 2015. When asked where she would like to go with it and when it would be released, she replied: "I do have early thoughts about what I'd like to do with it. My label, Interscope, is pretty flexible and open to my records coming out at any time, so I don't have that pressure. I'm just happy to be able to keep on making music I can stand behind. That's enough for me." In February 2016, during Clive Davis's Pre-Grammy Gala, Del Rey told Billboard that her then upcoming record would be a different direction from Honeymoon, while retaining the same aesthetic.

== Composition ==
Lust for Life mixes numerous music styles, garnering the labels "new-age folk" and "glacial trap pop". Dazed stated that the album continued Del Rey's "reign as dark alt-pop purveyor". It was described by Stereogum as her "version of an A-list pop album, with a big budget and big-name contributors". Rolling Stone defined Lust for Life "her poppiest turn since her debut". The record features recurring trap rhythms, classic rock references, "sepia-toned" orchestral backings, and Del Rey singing with a "hip-hop affectation". The Daily Telegraph stated that the album "lets a bit of light into the darkness of Del Rey's moody past works," noting that "there's a sense of heightened drama in punchy Phil Spector style sixties back beats and the way the heavy timpani criss-crosses with echoing digital trap beats, all swathed in a gauzy haze of Shangri Las style girl group harmonies." The Guardian described the album's sound as "sleek contemporary-sounding soundscapes," and noted "Summer Bummer"'s "eerie production and futuristic melancholy sounding closer to a track from Frank Ocean's Blonde than her usual 50s and 60s enthralled shtick." The A.V. Club praised its modern simplicity, noting that "its beats are subtle hip-hop twitches or electro-pop swells, with percussion redolent of faraway fireworks booms or mellifluous melodic washes." Pitchfork stated that the album "presented alt-pop's quintessential sad girl as actually—could it be?—happy".

== Promotion and release ==
Lust for Life's title was announced on March 29, 2017, when Del Rey released a trailer for the album, and the album's cover art was released by her on social media on April 11. On April 18, in an interview with Courtney Love for Dazed magazine, Del Rey confirmed a collaboration on the album with Canadian singer the Weeknd, called "Lust for Life", and a collaboration with Sean Lennon, "Tomorrow Never Came". She claimed to have worked with Swedish producer Max Martin for the title track, and was inspired by the Shangri-Las for the record's sound. A collaboration with Stevie Nicks entitled "Beautiful People, Beautiful Problems" was also confirmed to be featured on the album. The album was released on July 21.

=== Singles and other songs ===
In January 2017, the lead single from the record, "Love", was registered online on Harry Fox Agency under the alternate title "Young in Love". On February 17, promotional posters for the "Love" music video directed by Rich Lee were put on display across Los Angeles. Later that day, the song leaked online, forcing Del Rey to release the song earlier than she had expected; it was released worldwide on February 18, and the music video on February 20. "Love" debuted at number 44 on the US Billboard Hot 100 and number two on the US Hot Rock Songs chart. On April 19, BBC Radio 1 premiered Del Rey's new song, "Lust for Life", featuring the Weeknd. The song's audio was released to the iTunes Store and streaming services a few hours later, being the second single from the album. On May 15, Del Rey released "Coachella – Woodstock in My Mind" as the album's first promotional single.

On June 3, Del Rey teased a song that features ASAP Rocky and Playboi Carti. The song was later confirmed to be "Summer Bummer", released to UK radio as the third single from the album on July 28. On the same day, "Groupie Love" featuring Rocky was released to Italian radio as the fourth single from the album. "White Mustang" was accompanied by a music video published on September 13, which illustrates a futuristic Los Angeles in an aesthetic reminiscence of "High by the Beach".

=== Tour ===
On July 24, 2017, Del Rey began a small promotional tour at the Brixton Academy in London in promotion of Lust for Life. Other stops on the promotional tour include San Diego, Anaheim, Glasgow, Liverpool, San Francisco, Santa Barbara, and New York City. Aside from these select side shows, Del Rey embarked on the world tour—entitled the LA to the Moon Tour—to further promote the album. It began on January 5, 2018, in Minneapolis, Minnesota, and further included shows in North America, South America, Australia, and Europe, with the opening acts Kali Uchis and Jhene Aiko. The tour was concluded at Honolulu on February 28.

== Critical reception ==
Professional ratings
Aggregate scores
Source	Rating
AnyDecentMusic?	7.2/10
Metacritic	77/100
Review scores
Source	Rating
AllMusic	3.5/5 stars
The A.V. Club	B
The Daily Telegraph	4/5 stars
Financial Times	4/5 stars
The Guardian	4/5 stars
The Independent	4/5 stars
NME	4/5 stars
The Observer	4/5 stars
Pitchfork	7.7/10
Rolling Stone	3.5/5 stars

Lust for Life received positive reviews. At Metacritic, which assigns a normalized rating out of a 100 to reviews from mainstream publications, the album received an average score of 77, based on 26 reviews, indicating "generally favorable reviews", becoming Del Rey's second best reviewed album at the time, behind Honeymoon.

Neil McCormick of The Daily Telegraph said the album is a "welcome throwback to the hip hop swagger that pushed through her fantastic 2012 debut Born to Die". Jon Pareles of The New York Times wrote a favorable review, saying the album "in rare moments, hints at a wink behind Ms. Del Rey's somber lullabies." In a very positive review from GQ Magazine, Kevin Long wrote that "Like Lorde's Melodrama, Lust for Life is an accomplished piece of art, an antidote to the banal tunes permeating the charts and one of the best albums released this year so far."

Billboard named Lust for Life their album of the week, writing "In a 2017 pop game riddled with thirst, trend-hops and burn-outs, Lana Del Rey has earned a remarkable, singular consistency." Writing for The Independent, Roison O'Connor wrote that "Lust For Life is more of an elaboration on her favourite subjects rather than a repetition, in fact, it's her most expansive album to date," concluding that "Del Rey is far more self-aware than she has been on her previous albums." El Hunt of DIY wrote that Lust for Life is "a record that is prepared to be truly vulnerable, and is all the more impactful for it."

== Commercial performance ==
Lust for Life debuted at number one on the US Billboard 200 with 107,000 album-equivalent units of which 80,000 were pure album sales, marking Del Rey's second number one on the chart. The album also notably kept Tyler, the Creator's Flower Boy from the number one spot by 1,000 units. The record also debuted at number one on the UK Albums Chart with sales of 24,972 copies giving Del Rey her third number-one album on the chart. In South Korea, the album debuted at number 57 on the Gaon Album Chart and at number five on the international version of the same chart. The album was certified Gold in the US, UK, France, Australia, Italy, Denmark, and Poland. It was certified Platinum in both Canada and Brazil. The album has sold over 160,555 copies in China, and was the 10th best selling western album of 2018 in China.

== Accolades ==
=== Awards and nominations ===
Year	Organization	Award	Result	Ref.
2018	Gaffa Awards (Denmark)	International Album of the Year	Nominated	
2018	Gaffa Awards (Sweden)	Best Foreign Album	Nominated	
2018	Grammy Awards	Best Pop Vocal Album	Nominated	
2018	Pop Awards	Album of the Year	Nominated	

=== Year-end lists ===
Publication	Accolade	Rank	Ref.
Billboard	50 Best Albums of 2017	48	
Complex	Top 50 Albums of 2017	46	
Cosmopolitan	Best Albums of 2017	9	
Drowned in Sound	Favourite Albums of 2017	69	
The Independent	The 30 best albums of 2017	21	
NME	Albums of the Year	8	
Noisey	The 100 Best Albums of 2017	19	
Pitchfork	The 50 Best Albums of 2017	32	
PopMatters	The 60 Best Albums of 2017	53	
Rolling Stone	50 Best Albums of 2017	26	

== Track listing ==
All lyrics and melodies were written by Lana Del Rey.

Lust for Life track listing
No.	Title	Writer(s)	Producer(s)	Length
1.	"Love"	Lana Del Rey; Rick Nowels; Benjamin Levin; Emile Haynie	Del Rey; Nowels; Haynie; Benny Blanco; Kieron Menzies^{[a]}	4:32
2.	"Lust for Life" (featuring the Weeknd)	Del Rey; Nowels; Abel Tesfaye; Max Martin	Del Rey; Nowels; Menzies; Dean Reid; Martin^{[a]}	4:24
3.	"13 Beaches"	Del Rey; Nowels	Del Rey; Nowels; Menzies; Reid; Mighty Mike^{[a]}	4:55
4.	"Cherry"	Del Rey; Tim Larcombe	Del Rey; Nowels; Larcombe; Reid; Menzies^{[a]}	3:00
5.	"White Mustang"	Del Rey; Nowels	Del Rey; Nowels; Menzies; Reid	2:44
6.	"Summer Bummer" (featuring ASAP Rocky and Playboi Carti)	Del Rey; Matthew Samuels; Rakim Mayers; Jordan Carter; Tyler Williams; Jahaan Sweet; Andrew Joseph Gradwohl Jr.	Boi-1da; Sweet; Nowels^{[a]}	4:20
7.	"Groupie Love" (featuring ASAP Rocky)	Del Rey; Nowels; Mayers	Del Rey; Nowels; Menzies; Reid	4:24
8.	"In My Feelings"	Del Rey; Nowels	Del Rey; Nowels; Menzies; Reid	3:58
9.	"Coachella – Woodstock in My Mind"	Del Rey; Nowels	Del Rey; Nowels; Menzies; Reid	4:18
10.	"God Bless America – and All the Beautiful Women in It"	Del Rey; Nowels	Nowels; Menzies; Reid; Metro Boomin; Del Rey^{[a]}	4:36
11.	"When the World Was at War We Kept Dancing"	Del Rey; Nowels; Reid	Del Rey; Nowels; Menzies; Reid	4:35
12.	"Beautiful People Beautiful Problems" (featuring Stevie Nicks)	Del Rey; Nowels; Justin Parker; Nicks	Del Rey; Nowels; Menzies; Reid	4:13
13.	"Tomorrow Never Came" (featuring Sean Ono Lennon)	Del Rey; Lennon; Nowels	Del Rey; Nowels; Lennon	5:07
14.	"Heroin"	Del Rey; Nowels	Del Rey; Nowels; Menzies; Reid; Mighty Mike^{[a]}	5:55
15.	"Change"	Del Rey; Nowels	Del Rey; Nowels; Menzies	5:21
16.	"Get Free"	Del Rey; Nowels; Menzies	Del Rey; Nowels; Menzies; Reid	5:34
Total length:				72:08

=== Notes ===
- ^{^[a]} signifies an additional producer.
- "13 Beaches" contains an audio snippet from the motion picture Carnival of Souls performed by Candace Hilligoss.

== Credits and personnel ==
Credits were adapted from the liner notes.

- Lana Del Rey – vocals (all tracks), production (tracks 1–5, 7–9, 11–16), additional production (track 10)
- The Weeknd – vocals (track 2)
- ASAP Rocky – vocals (tracks 6, 7)
- Playboi Carti – vocals (track 6)
- Stevie Nicks – vocals, backing vocals (track 12)
- Sean Ono Lennon – vocals (track 13), production (track 13), shaker (track 13), timpani (track 13), electric upright bass (track 13), acoustic guitar (track 13), electric guitar (track 13), celesta (track 13), harpsichord (track 13), glass harmonica (track 13), Mongolian bells (track 13), Mellotron (track 13)
- Rick Nowels – bass (tracks 1, 13, 15, 16), Mellotron (tracks 1, 2, 5, 8–10, 12–15), vibraphone (tracks 1, 7), keyboards (tracks 1, 8, 16), synth pads (tracks 2, 3, 5, 6, 9, 10, 16), piano (tracks 3, 5, 8, 10, 12, 15), strings (tracks 3, 8), celesta (tracks 9, 15), organ (tracks 9, 12–14, 16), acoustic guitar (tracks 10, 11, 13), flute (tracks 10, 12), 808 bass (track 10), solina (track 12), synth bass (track 12), electric piano (track 14), choir (track 14)
- Kieron Menzies – production (tracks 1–5, 7–12, 14–16), engineering (tracks 1–16), mixing (tracks 1–16), drums (tracks 2, 3, 5, 7, 9–11, 15), tape loops (tracks 2, 9, 10, 16), percussion (tracks 2, 3, 5, 7–12, 15, 16), keyboards (tracks 2, 3, 7–11, 15), synth pads (track 2), strings (tracks 2, 4, 5), bass (track 3), synthesizer (tracks 3, 5, 7, 8, 11, 16), modem (track 3), piano (track 8)
- Dean Reid – production (tracks 2–5, 7–12, 14, 16), engineering (tracks 1–14, 16), mixing (tracks 2–12, 14, 16), electric guitar (tracks 1, 14, 16), drums (tracks 2, 4, 5, 7–9, 11, 12), percussion (tracks 2, 8, 10–12, 16), bass guitar (tracks 2, 10), vocoder (tracks 2, 7), effects (tracks 2, 4, 5, 7–9, 14), guitar synthesizer (track 2), synth bass (tracks 3, 11, 14, 16), bass (tracks 4, 5, 7–9), strings (tracks 4, 10, 11), synthesizer (tracks 5, 8–11), flute (track 9), Mellotron (track 9), brass (track 10)
- Zac Rae – synthesizer (tracks 2, 3, 7, 10, 16), strings (track 4), harpsichord (track 6), drums (tracks 7, 11), percussion (track 7), bass guitar (tracks 7, 11), electric guitar (track 7), piano (track 10), organ (tracks 11, 16), Mellotron (track 16), guitar (track 16)
- Patrick Warren – harmonium (track 3), synthesizer (tracks 3, 12, 14), waterphone (track 3), tack piano (track 10), strings (tracks 10, 12), piano (tracks 13), organ (track 13), bassoon (track 14), flute (track 14)
- Mighty Mike – additional production (track 3, 14), bongos (track 2), drums (tracks 3, 14, 16), percussion (tracks 3, 14, 16), keyboards (track 3), percussion (track 7)
- David Levita – electric guitar (tracks 2, 7, 10, 12, 13, 16)
- Trevor Yasuda – engineering (tracks 1–14, 16), keyboards (tracks 5, 7, 9, 12, 13, 16)
- Aaron Sterling – live drums (tracks 7, 11, 16), tambourine (track 11), percussion (track 16)
- Tim Larcombe – additional production (track 4), electric guitar (track 4), drums (track 4), Mellotron (track 4)
- Metro Boomin – production (track 10), drums (track 10), percussion (10), synth bass (track 10)
- Benny Blanco – production (track 1), mixing (track 1), drums (track 1), keyboards (track 1)
- Max Martin – additional production (track 2), Juno bass (track 2)
- Ali Payami – drum programming (track 2)
- Dan Heath – orchestra overture (track 3)
- David Palmer – synthesizer (track 10)
- Sean Hurley – bass (track 12)
- T-Minus – cello (track 6), synth (track 6)
- Boi-1da – production (track 6), drums (track 6), bass (track 6)
- Jahaan Sweet – production (track 6), piano (track 6)
- Andrew Joseph Gradwohl Jr. – synthesizer (track 6)
- Berkay Birecikli – percussion (track 7)
- Hector Delgado – engineering (tracks 6, 7), effects (track 7)
- Emile Haynie – production (track 1), mixing (track 1), drums (track 1), synthesizer (track 1)
- Gary Ferguson – live drums (tracks 12, 14)
- Chris Garcia – engineering (tracks 4, 5, 9, 16)
- Jordan Stilwell – engineering (tracks 2, 3)
- Matthew Cullen – engineering (track 13), mixing (track 13)
- Adam Ayan – mastering (tracks 2–16)
- Mike Bozzi – mastering (track 1)
- Chuck Grant – photography
- Neil Krug – photography
- Mat Maitland – design
- Markus Bagå – design

== Charts ==
=== Weekly charts ===
Chart (2017)	Peak position
Australian Albums (ARIA)	1
Austrian Albums (Ö3 Austria)	5
Belgian Albums (Ultratop Flanders)	4
Belgian Albums (Ultratop Wallonia)	2
Canadian Albums (Billboard)	1
Croatian International Albums (HDU)	1
Czech Albums (ČNS IFPI)	2
Danish Albums (Hitlisten)	5
Dutch Albums (Album Top 100)	6
Finnish Albums (Suomen virallinen lista)	3
French Albums (SNEP)	3
German Albums (Offizielle Top 100)	8
Greek Albums (IFPI)	5
Hungarian Albums (MAHASZ)	18
Irish Albums (IRMA)	2
Italian Albums (FIMI)	6
Mexican Albums (AMPROFON)	1
New Zealand Albums (RMNZ)	2
Norwegian Albums (VG-lista)	1
Polish Albums (ZPAV)	2
Portuguese Albums (AFP)	1
Scottish Albums (Official Charts)	1
Slovak Albums (ČNS IFPI)	3
South Korean Albums (Gaon)	57
Spanish Albums (PROMUSICAE)	1
Swedish Albums (Sverigetopplistan)	1
Swiss Albums (Schweizer Hitparade)	2
UK Albums (Official Charts)	1
US Billboard 200	1
US Top Alternative Albums (Billboard)	1
US Vinyl Albums (Billboard)	20

=== Year-end charts ===
Chart (2017)	Position
Australian Albums (ARIA)	87
Belgian Albums (Ultratop Flanders)	75
Belgian Albums (Ultratop Wallonia)	196
French Albums (SNEP)	132
Mexican Albums (AMPROFON)	54
Polish Albums (ZPAV)	78
Spanish Albums (PROMUSICAE)	90
Swedish Albums (Sverigetopplistan)	92
Swiss Albums (Schweizer Hitparade)	93
UK Albums (OCC)	100
US Billboard 200	142
US Alternative Albums	12

Chart (2018)	Position
US Alternative Albums	15

== Certifications ==
Certifications and sales
Region	Certification	Certified units/sales
Australia (ARIA)	Gold	35,000^{‡}
Austria (IFPI Austria)	Gold	7,500^{‡}
Brazil (Pro-Música Brasil)	Platinum	40,000^{‡}
Canada (Music Canada)	Platinum	80,000^{‡}
Denmark (IFPI Danmark)	Gold	10,000^{‡}
France (SNEP)	Gold	50,000^{‡}
Germany (BVMI)	Gold	100,000^{‡}
Italy (FIMI)	Gold	25,000^{‡}
New Zealand (RMNZ)	Platinum	15,000^{‡}
Poland (ZPAV)	2× Platinum	40,000^{‡}
United Kingdom (BPI)	Gold	100,000^{‡} / 108,773
United States (RIAA)	Gold	500,000^{‡}
^{‡} Sales+streaming figures based on certification alone.

== See also ==
- List of UK Albums Chart number ones in 2017
- List of number-one albums of 2017 (Sweden)
- List of number-one albums of 2017 (Australia)
- List of number-one albums of 2017 (Canada)
- List of number-one albums of 2017 (Mexico)
- List of number-one albums of 2017 (Norway)
- List of number-one albums of 2017 (Spain)
- List of Billboard 200 number-one albums of 2017
