= See You Again (Tyler, the Creator song) =

2017 Tyler, the Creator song

Single by Tyler, the Creator featuring Kali Uchis

from the album Flower Boy
- Written: 2014
- Released: August 29, 2017
- Recorded: 2013 🞗 2014-2017
- Genre: R&B; pop-rap
- Length: 3:00
- Label: Columbia
- Songwriter: Tyler Okonma
- Producer: Okonma

Tyler, the Creator singles chronology
"I Ain't Got Time!" (2017)	"See You Again" (2017)	"After the Storm" (2018)

Kali Uchis singles chronology
"Tyrant" (2017)	"See You Again" (2017)	"Nuestro Planeta" (2017)

Music video
- "See You Again" on YouTube

"See You Again" is a song written, produced, and performed by American rapper and producer Tyler, the Creator featuring vocals from Colombian-American singer Kali Uchis. It was released as the fourth single from Tyler's fifth studio album Flower Boy (2017) on August 29, 2017. The single went viral on TikTok, leading the song to enter several charts around the world for the first time as a sleeper hit in April 2023.

== Background ==
Tyler, the Creator initially created the instrumental for the song in 2013, with his friend Hodgy Beats posting a snippet of it via Vine. This song was first recorded during a studio session in 2014 with Kali and Tyler.

Tyler, the Creator originally wrote the song for former One Direction member Zayn Malik, who turned it down. According to Tyler, Malik "flaked on studio time twice" and he kept the song for himself.

== Commercial performance ==
Upon release, the song peaked at number 13 on the US Bubbling Under Hot 100 and failed to chart on the main Billboard Hot 100. However, in April 2023, the song went viral on TikTok, leading to its first ever appearance on the US Billboard Hot 100 at number 65 before the song reached a peak of number 44. It has also been considered Tyler, the Creator's most successful single to date.

== Music video ==
The music video was directed by Tyler, the Creator under the alias of Wolf Haley and uploaded on YouTube on August 8, 2018. ASAP Rocky makes a cameo to the video, as well as Tyler Baudelaire, the alter ego later used for the promotion of Call Me If You Get Lost (2021).

In the opening scene, Tyler gets ready for another workday in the close quarters of an aircraft carrier, putting on a suit and eating breakfast while singing the first verse. Kali Uchis appears far away at sea singing the chorus on a rescue boat with other rowers, who jump off the boat near the end of the verse. The second verse shifts to Tyler on the top deck of the military ship, donning a yellow beret, while soldiers walk behind him. The scene also shows him jumping and walking atop the soldier's heads, with another person covered in shadows singing the pre-chorus while a man plays trumpet behind him. The scene then shifts to a figure covered in a ghost bed sheet, with the eyes poked out and a bucket hat. At the end of the video, the sheet is pulled off revealing the figure being made up of bees which fly towards the screen.

== Charts ==
=== Weekly charts ===
2017 chart performance for "See You Again"
Chart (2017)	Peak position
New Zealand Heatseekers (RMNZ)	3
US Bubbling Under Hot 100 (Billboard)	13
US Bubbling Under R&B/Hip-Hop Singles (Billboard)	1

2023–2024 chart performance for "See You Again"
Chart (2023–2024)	Peak position
Australia (ARIA)	28
Australia Hip Hop/R&B (ARIA)	3
Canada Hot 100 (Billboard)	30
Global 200 (Billboard)	35
Iceland (Tónlistinn)	26
Ireland (IRMA)	44
Latvia (LAIPA)	5
Lithuania (AGATA)	7
Netherlands (Single Top 100)	100
New Zealand (Recorded Music NZ)	13
Poland (Polish Streaming Top 100)	81
Portugal (AFP)	66
Sweden Heatseeker (Sverigetopplistan)	11
Switzerland (Schweizer Hitparade)	98
UK Singles (Official Charts)	21
UK Hip Hop/R&B (Official Charts)	5
US Billboard Hot 100	44
US Hot R&B/Hip-Hop Songs (Billboard)	12

=== Year-end charts ===
2023 year-end chart performance for "See You Again"
Chart (2023)	Position
Canada (Canadian Hot 100)	88
Global 200 (Billboard)	133
Iceland (Tónlistinn)	82
US Hot R&B/Hip-Hop Songs (Billboard)	34

2024 year-end chart performance for "See You Again"
Chart (2024)	Position
Australia Hip Hop/R&B (ARIA)	22
Global 200 (Billboard)	110
Iceland (Tónlistinn)	93

2025 year-end chart performance for "See You Again"
Chart (2025)	Position
Global 200 (Billboard)	70

== Certifications ==
Certifications for "See You Again"
Region	Certification	Certified units/sales
Australia (ARIA)	6× Platinum	420,000^{‡}
Canada (Music Canada)	2× Platinum	160,000^{‡}
Denmark (IFPI Danmark)	Platinum	90,000^{‡}
France (SNEP)	Diamond	333,333^{‡}
Germany (BVMI)	Gold	300,000^{‡}
Italy (FIMI)	Gold	50,000^{‡}
Mexico (AMPROFON)	2× Diamond+Platinum	660,000^{‡}
New Zealand (RMNZ)	6× Platinum	180,000^{‡}
Poland (ZPAV)	Platinum	50,000^{‡}
Portugal (AFP)	5× Platinum	125,000^{‡}
Spain (Promusicae)	Platinum	60,000^{‡}
United Kingdom (BPI)	2× Platinum	1,200,000^{‡}
United States (RIAA)	6× Platinum	6,000,000^{‡}
Streaming
Greece (IFPI Greece)	Gold	1,000,000^{†}
Sweden (GLF)	Platinum	8,000,000^{†}
^{‡} Sales+streaming figures based on certification alone.^{†} Streaming-only figures based on certification alone.

== Release history ==
Release dates and formats for "See You Again"
Region	Date	Format	Label	Ref.
United States	August 29, 2017	Rhythmic contemporary radio; urban contemporary radio	Columbia	
