= Who Dat Boy =

Single by Tyler, the Creator featuring ASAP Rocky

from the album Flower Boy
- B-side: "911 / Mr. Lonely"
- Released: June 30, 2017
- Genre: Hip hop
- Length: 3:25
- Label: Columbia
- Songwriters: Tyler Okonma; Rakim Mayers
- Producers: Tyler, the Creator

Tyler, the Creator singles chronology
"Biking" (2017)	"Who Dat Boy" (2017)	"911 / Mr. Lonely" (2017)

ASAP Rocky singles chronology
"Raf" (2017)	"Who Dat Boy" (2017)	"Summer Bummer" (2017)

Music video
- "Who Dat Boy" on YouTube

"Who Dat Boy" is a song written and performed by American rapper and producer Tyler, the Creator featuring fellow American rapper ASAP Rocky. Produced by the former, it was released on June 30, 2017 alongside, "911 / Mr. Lonely" through Columbia Records, as the lead singles from his fifth studio album Flower Boy.

== Background ==
Tyler, the Creator began a one-week countdown on Twitter and Instagram to promote and release the two dual-singles called "Who Dat Boy" and "911 / Mr. Lonely" on June 30, 2017. The single debuted at 87 on the Billboard Hot 100. The song was originally written for Schoolboy Q, but he turned it down.

== Music video ==
The song's accompanying music video was uploaded on June 29, 2017 on Tyler's official YouTube channel. The music video was directed by Tyler under the pseudonym Wolf Haley. The music video features rapper Action Bronson's face being sewn onto Tyler's, as well as visual allusions to the 2017 film Get Out. It also features a snippet of the song "911/ Mr. Lonely" at the end of the track. The video features rapper A$AP Rocky, who is the doctor performing the operation, and Tucker Tripp, who is Tyler's co-driver.

== Track listing ==
Digital download
No.	Title	Length
1.	"Who Dat Boy" (featuring ASAP Rocky)	3:25
2.	"911 / Mr. Lonely" (featuring Frank Ocean and Steve Lacy)	4:15

== Charts ==
Chart (2017)	Peak position
Australia (ARIA)	92
Canada Hot 100 (Billboard)	60
New Zealand Heatseekers (RMNZ)	2
UK Singles (Official Charts)	93
US Billboard Hot 100	87
US Hot R&B/Hip-Hop Songs (Billboard)	36

== Certifications ==
Region	Certification	Certified units/sales
Australia (ARIA)	Gold	35,000^{‡}
Canada (Music Canada)	Platinum	80,000^{‡}
New Zealand (RMNZ)	Platinum	30,000^{‡}
United Kingdom (BPI)	Silver	200,000^{‡}
United States (RIAA)	2× Platinum	2,000,000^{‡}
^{‡} Sales+streaming figures based on certification alone.

== Release history ==
Region	Date	Format	Label	Ref.
United States	June 30, 2017	Digital download	Columbia	
United Kingdom	June 30, 2017	Contemporary hit radio	Columbia	
