= Anna of the North =

Norwegian singer-songwriter

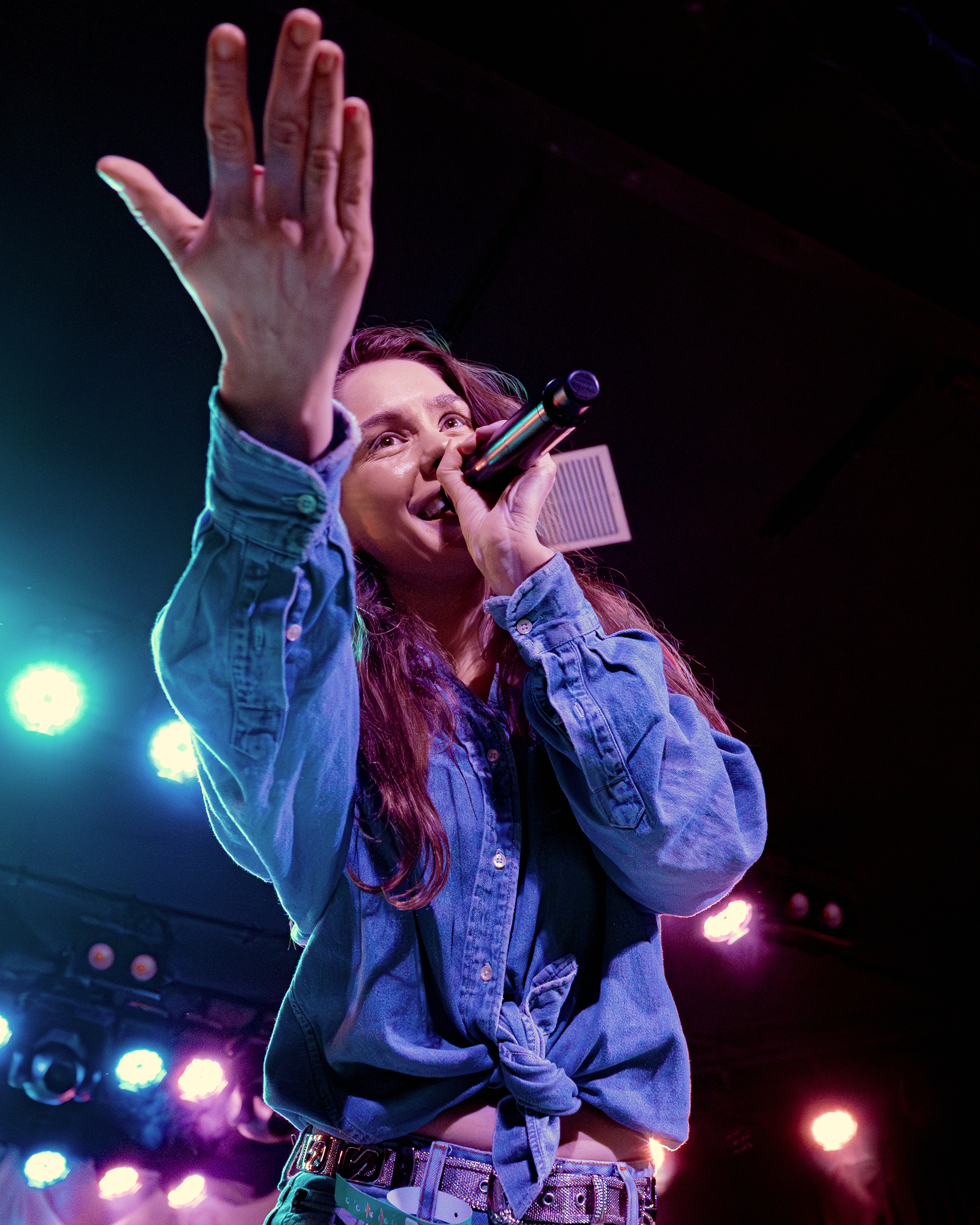
- Anna of the North in 2025

Background information
- Born: 1989 (age 36–37)
- Origin: Gjøvik, Norway
- Genres: Electropop; dream pop
- Years active: 2014–present
- Labels: Honeymoon; Different; 300
- Members: Anna Lotterud
- Past members: Brady Daniell-Smith
- Website: annaofthenorth.com

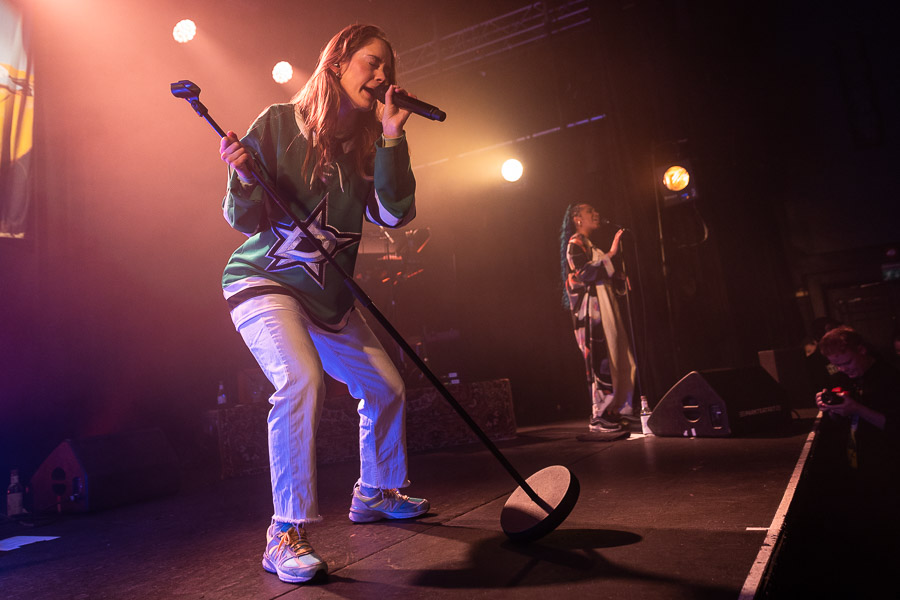
Anna of the North performing at Parkteatret Scene in Oslo in 2019

Anna of the North is the solo project of Anna Lotterud, an Oslo-based Norwegian singer-songwriter from Gjøvik. Originally formed as a duo with producer Brady Daniell-Smith in 2014, their debut studio album Lovers was released in 2017. Daniell-Smith left the group in 2018, with Lotterud continuing to use the name. Anna of the North's second album, Dream Girl, released in October 2019, was made by Lotterud in association with various producers. Their music has been regarded as "soft, soul-baring electro-pop".

== Early life ==
Anna Lotterud was born in 1989 in the small town of Gjøvik in Norway. Her father was a musician. She studied graphic design before moving to Melbourne for further studies.

== Music career ==
During her studies in Melbourne, Australia, Anna met New Zealand producer Brady Daniell-Smith at one of his shows and together formed Anna Of The North, with Anna performing vocals and Brady producing the melodies.

In June 2014, Anna of the North released their debut single "Sway", which became an immediate internet hit and landed the duo a record deal with Honeymoon in the US. In September 2014, The Chainsmokers officially remixed "Sway".

They followed up the song with "The Dreamer" and "Baby", hitting the top in Hype Machine and later supporting Kygo on tour across Europe. Over the next few months, she released the song "Us" and "Oslo" to critical acclaim.

In May 2017, Anna of the North announced their debut album Lovers with the title track and third single "Someone" for release on 8 September. This album included the song "Lovers"; Anna has said this song was inspired by a relationship ending; "I was really in love with this guy, and he broke up with me and it was super sad", although "There's still a hopefulness in there... There's still a future ahead, life is gonna get better."

In July 2017, Anna was featured on Tyler, the Creator's singles "Boredom" and "911 / Mr. Lonely" off his album Flower Boy alongside Rex Orange County and Frank Ocean, respectively. Anna was also invited to perform with Tyler, the Creator and Steve Lacy on The Late Show with Stephen Colbert.

Brady Daniell-Smith left the duo amicably in 2018.

Anna's second studio album, Dream Girl, was released on 25 October 2019. The title track appeared in an iPad Pro commercial in 2020. In October 2020, she released the EP Believe.

In 2021 she released the single "Here's To Another".

=== Use in films ===
The song Lovers, from the album of the same name, was the soundtrack for a romantic scene in the 2018 Netflix movie To All the Boys I've Loved Before. The song Dream Girl, from the album of the same name, was featured on the soundtrack for the 2021 Netflix movie To All The Boys: Always and Forever. Together with Ian Hultquist and Drum & Lace, Anna of the North contributed the songs 'Dancing on My Own' and 'Escape' to the original soundtrack for the 2022 romantic comedy Rosaline.

== Discography ==
=== Studio albums ===
Title	Details
Lovers	Released: 8 September 2017; Label: Honeymoon; Format: Digital download, streaming
Dream Girl	Released: 25 October 2019; Label: Honeymoon; Format: Digital download, streaming, vinyl
Crazy Life	Released: 4 November 2022; Label: Honeymoon; Format: Digital download, streaming
Girl in a Bottle	Released: 5 December 2025; Label: Play It Again Sam; Format: Digital download, streaming
Girl in a Bottle: Please Recycle	Released: 2026; Label: Play It Again Sam; Format: Digital download, streaming

=== EPs ===
Title	Details
Believe	Released: 23 October 2020; Label: Honeymoon; Format: Digital download, streaming
Hei På Deg	Released: 11 April 2025; Label: Honeymoon; Format: Digital download, streaming

=== Singles ===
Title	Year	Album
"Sway"	2014	Non-album singles
"The Dreamer"	2015	Non-album singles
"Baby"	2016	Lovers
"Us"	2016	Non-album singles
"Oslo"	2017	Non-album singles
"Lovers"	2017	Lovers
"Someone"	2017	Lovers
"Money"	2017	Lovers
"Fire"	2017	Lovers
"Nothing Compares 2 U"	2018	Non-album single
"Leaning on Myself"	2019	Dream Girl
"Used to Be"	2019	Dream Girl
"Thank Me Later"	2019	Dream Girl
"Playing Games"	2019	Dream Girl
"Dream Girl"	2019	Dream Girl
"Someone Special"	2020	Believe
"Believe"	2020	Believe
"Here's to Another"	2021	Non-album single
"Meteorite" (with Gus Dapperton)	2022	Crazy Life
"Dandelion"	2022	Crazy Life
"Bird Sing"	2022	Crazy Life
"Nobody"	2022	Crazy Life
"I Do You"	2022	Crazy Life
"Swirl"	2023	Crazy Life (Deluxe)
"Try My Best"	2023	Crazy Life (Deluxe)
"Young Folks" (with Dom Valentino and Alfie Templeman)	2023	Non-album single
"Hollywood Hills"	2024	Hei På Deg
"Møtte Deg I Døra"	2025	Hei På Deg
"Nesten Narkoman"	2025	Hei På Deg
"Hei På Deg"	2025	Hei På Deg
"Give Me Your Love Back"	2025	Girl in a Bottle
"Waiting for Love"	2025	Girl in a Bottle
"Call Me"	2025	Girl in a Bottle
"No One Knows You Better"	2025	Girl in a Bottle

=== Guest appearances ===
Title	Year	Artist(s)	Album
"Boredom"	2017	Tyler, the Creator and Rex Orange County	Flower Boy
"911 / Mr. Lonely"	2017	Tyler, the Creator, Frank Ocean, and Steve Lacy	Flower Boy
"Pick Me Up"	2017	G-Eazy	The Beautiful & Damned
"Charlie Brown"	2018	Rejjie Snow	Dear Annie
"IDGAF" (Anna of the North Remix)	2018	Dua Lipa	IDGAF (Remixes)
"Feels So Good ◑"	2018	Honne	Love Me / Love Me Not
"I Don't Even Know Why Though" (Anna of the North Remix)	2019	Alina Baraz	The Color Of You (Remixes)
"Summer Fade"	2019	Snakehips	TBA
"Over"	2020	PREP	TBA
"What About U"	2021	Lemaitre	Substellar
"Dancing On My Own"	2022	Drum & Lace and Ian Hultquist	Rosaline: Original Soundtrack
"Escape"	2022	Drum & Lace and Ian Hultquist	Rosaline: Original Soundtrack

== Awards and nominations ==
=== Sweden GAFFA Awards ===
Delivered since 2010, the GAFFA Awards (Swedish: GAFFA Priset) are a Swedish award that rewards popular music awarded by the magazine of the same name.

Year	Nominee / work	Award	Result	Ref.
2018	Herself	Best Foreign New Act	Nominated	
