= Call Me If You Get Lost =

2021 studio album by Tyler, the Creator

- Physical, Apple Music and YouTube Music cover. Spotify uses a cover with a green card, Amazon Music uses a blue card, Tidal uses a pink card.

Studio album by Tyler, the Creator
- Released: June 25, 2021
- Recorded: 2019–2021
- Studios: Chalice (Los Angeles); Coldwater (Los Angeles); Conway (Los Angeles); Westlake (Los Angeles); Shangri-La (Malibu)
- Genres: Hip-hop; jazz; soul
- Length: 52:41
- Label: Columbia
- Producers: Tyler, the Creator; Jamie xx; Jay Versace

Tyler, the Creator chronology
Igor (2019)	Call Me If You Get Lost (2021)	Chromakopia (2024)

Alternative cover
- By Gregory Ferrand, also used as the main cover for the Estate Sale edition

Singles from Call Me If You Get Lost
- 1. "Lumberjack" Released: June 16, 2021; 2. "WusYaName" Released: June 22, 2021

Call Me If You Get Lost (stylized in all caps) is the seventh studio album by the American rapper and producer Tyler, the Creator. The album was released on June 25, 2021, through Columbia Records. The album is narrated by DJ Drama and features guest appearances from 42 Dugg, YoungBoy Never Broke Again, Ty Dolla Sign, Lil Wayne, Domo Genesis, Brent Faiyaz, Lil Uzi Vert, Pharrell Williams, Teezo Touchdown, Fana Hues, and Daisy World. Tyler produced the album himself, with additional production contributed by Jamie xx and Jay Versace.

The album marks a departure from the lighter and more soulful aesthetics of Tyler's previous releases Igor (2019) and Flower Boy (2017) in favor of bold beats and raw rhymes reminiscent of his earlier work, influenced by DJ Drama's Gangsta Grillz mixtape series. Genres on the album span hip-hop, pop, jazz, soul and reggae.

Call Me If You Get Lost was supported by two singles: "Lumberjack" and "WusYaName", both of which were released alongside music videos. The album received widespread acclaim from critics and has been described as a mix of styles, with hints of nostalgia throughout its production. Some critics compared the album to his previous release, Igor. It was placed in the top tens of the best albums of 2021 by multiple publications. The album debuted at number one on the US Billboard 200, becoming Tyler, the Creator's second US number-one album. It won the award for Best Rap Album at the 2022 Grammy Awards, Tyler's second win. In 2023, Tyler released a deluxe version of the album, titled Call Me If You Get Lost: The Estate Sale.

== Concept ==
The cover art depicts an identification card for a character named "Tyler Baudelaire". Some critics have taken this as a reference to the French poet Charles Baudelaire. Tyler has stated that this is not true, attributing the reference to Lemony Snicket's A Series of Unfortunate Events, saying that he admired the dynamic between the Baudelaire orphans. According to Matthew Ismael Ruiz of Pitchfork, "Baudelaire, the character Tyler plays throughout the album, is a proxy for Tyler's newfound worldliness—and his inability to leverage that sophistication into the relationship of his dreams." Charles Baudelaire's most famous work, 1857's Les Fleurs du mal (transl. The Flowers of Evil), was "originally banned for being too explicit, and Baudelaire himself was prosecuted for indecency", similar to Tyler's evolution from an "angsty teen spewing filth for shock value into sensitive lover man with a mischievous streak". Luke Morgan Britton of NME also compared the two, saying that both "have been fixated on the struggle between romance and realism, luxury and love, beauty and death, talents and controversies."

Initially, when Tyler unveiled the cover art for Call Me If You Get Lost, people thought that he had taken inspiration from Ol' Dirty Bastard's 1995 album, Return to the 36 Chambers: The Dirty Version, when in actuality he had taken inspiration from "old passport and travel cards from [the] early 1900s".

== Music ==
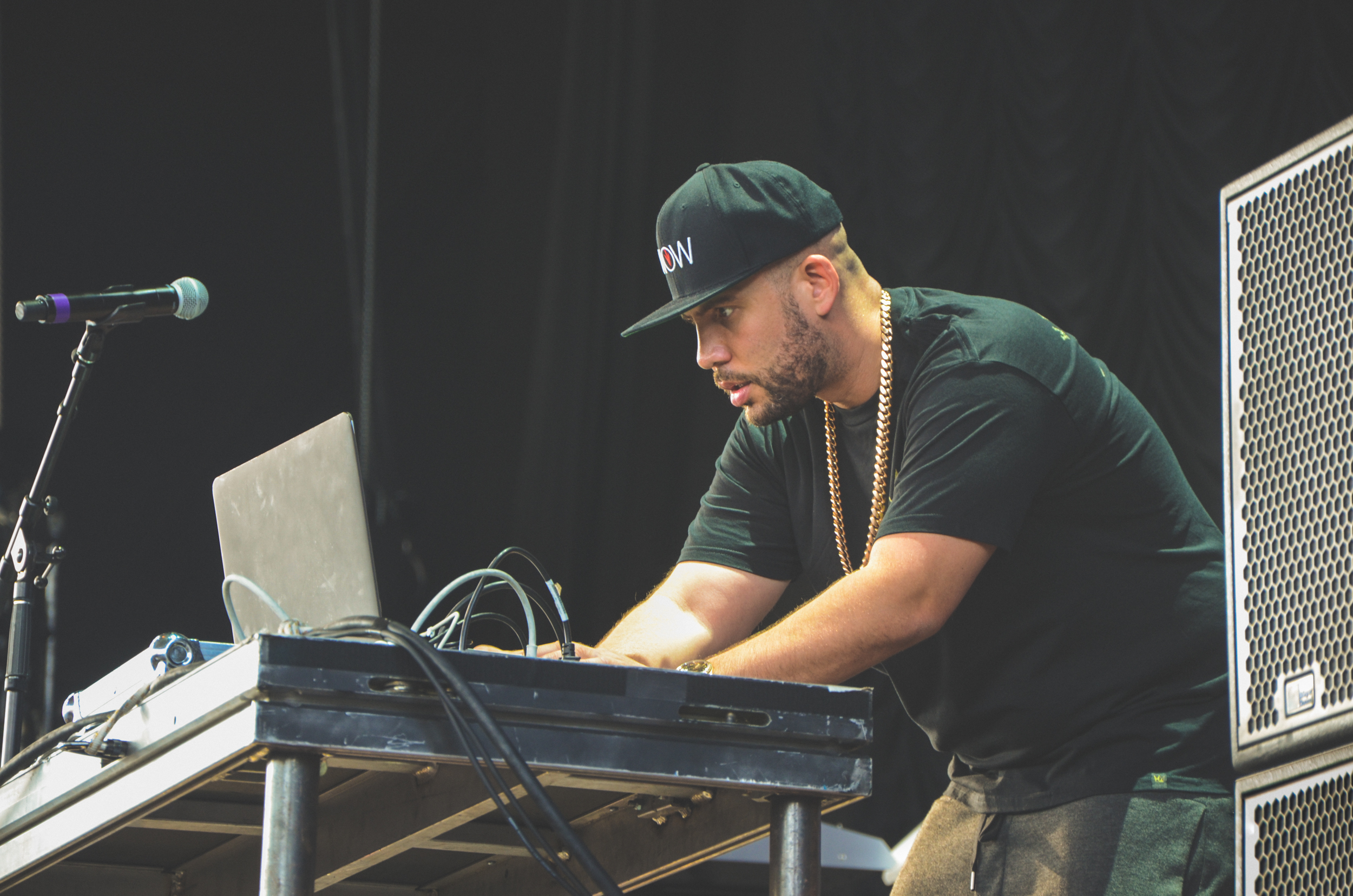
Tyler worked with DJ Drama on Call Me If You Get Lost, known for his mixtape series Gangsta Grillz.

NME's Luke Morgan Britton called Call Me If You Get Lost "an all-encompassing culmination of Tyler's ever-varying sound, showing that growth isn't always linear and that artists can be a multitude of things", further saying that the album cements Tyler's place as a "generational talent, one in fine form and continuing to push the boundaries of his vision and kaleidoscopic sound." The Guardian's Alexis Petridis called the album's stylistic lurches both "unexpected and hugely impressive, the product of an artist with eclectic tastes and a disinclination to make music that fits in with prevalent trends." Petridis highlighted synth-pop, soul, reggae and jazz. The Financial Times's Ludovic Hunter-Tilney called the album's production "densely layered and quixotic", saying that "Lemonhead" switches from hard-hitting beats and a babble of voices into easy-listening bossa nova, while "Massa" switches a flute-led jazz routine into stripped-back hip-hop.

In comparison to Igor, The Independent's Roisin O'Connor said "the production here [on Call Me If You Get Lost] is as slick as Igor, though, there's less of a through line. Igor was the devastating pieced-together parts of a broken relationship. Call Me If You Get Lost plays fast and loose with its subjects, relying instead on the music itself to carry listeners through." According to Pitchfork's Matthew Ismael Ruiz, Tyler is more "adept than ever at weaving different ideas into one cohesive song, rather than just smushing them together" on the album. Ruiz described Tyler's production as "toying with movement in the mix, bouncing sounds between left and right channels for an immersive headphones experience." While Call Me If You Get Lost has a very specific underlying narrative lyrically, Ruiz said that the production styles seem to tell the story of Tyler's whole career up to this point: post-Thundercat R&B, a Gravediggaz horrorcore sample, and a Salaam Remi flip comparable to the music of Kendrick Lamar. Ruiz called the album a return to rap following the pop sound of Igor, though notes that Tyler is also "clearly light years away from the skeletal productions of his first few records." Konstantinos Pappis of Our Culture Mag described the album's songs as having "cinematic grandeur and meticulous arrangements that have characterized Tyler's recent material". Pappis also noted that the sound is as "wondrously nostalgic" as it was on Flower Boy.

Craig Jenkins of Vulture also regarded the album as a step back into "the cranky, devil-may-care style and attitude of his [Tyler, the Creator's] early days" while also channelling "all the ways he's changed since then". Jenkins highlighted Call Me If You Get Lost as a departure from the "lighter and more soulful aesthetics of Igor in favor of brash beats and raw rhymes... somewhat after the Gangsta Grillz mixtapes of the aughts and early 2010s." Chris Deville of Stereogum found that Call Me If You Get Lost has influences of hip-hop blockbuster albums, such as The Marshall Mathers LP (2000) and Tha Carter III (2008). Deville also said that "the sheer grandiosity" of the album – "the elaborate cinematic production, the insane cast of guest rappers" – is reminiscent of Kanye West's earlier music. Deville also notes that the samples from various 1990s rappers compare to the golden age of boom bap.

Marcus Shorter of Consequence said of the album that self-awareness dominates its second half. Shorter further notes that romance is a prominent theme in the album's second half: "That journey includes heartbreak, because no Tyler, The Creator album is complete without romance." Shorter specifically describes "Wilshire": "He stumbles over words and mumbles parts of a sad story, sounding like someone not fully ready to handle the truth. On an album filled with dope lines from a guy who always says it with his chest, "Wilshire" is a rare moment where we feel him holding back. The ego is tucked into the closet for one song, further blurring the lines between the man, the persona, and the alter-ego."

== Release and promotion ==
On June 9, 2021, a promotional billboard for the album's rollout was spotted in Los Angeles, which was followed by more sightings in other major cities around the world. The billboard read "Call Me If You Get Lost" and included the phone number, +1 (855) 444-8888. When called, a recorded message was played of a conversation between Tyler and his mother. That recording is in the album as the track "Momma Talk". Soon thereafter, a website was discovered that references the billboard and phone number, appearing to be another aspect of the album's promotion, subsequently the audio played when calling the phone number would change to a snippet of the album track "Rise!". On June 15, Tyler tweeted the phone number which was seen on billboards the week prior, confirming his involvement.

On June 14, 2021, Tyler teased new music in a short video titled "Side Street", featuring himself holding a dog while making out with a woman. There is also a cameo of fellow Odd Future member Taco Bennett closer to the end of the video. Tyler directed the video under the moniker of his alter-ego Wolf Haley. On June 16, 2021, Tyler released a song titled "Lumberjack", which was accompanied by a short music video, also directed by Tyler himself as Wolf Haley. The song samples the song "2 Cups of Blood" by Gravediggaz.

The following day, June 17, Tyler officially confirmed the album's title as Call Me If You Get Lost and announced a release date for June 25. He also announced the cover art and merchandise through his streetwear brand Golf Wang. On June 22, 2021, Tyler released the album's second single titled "WusYaName" featuring rapper YoungBoy Never Broke Again and singer Ty Dolla Sign also accompanied by a self-directed short music video. Employing elements from '90s-era R&B, this song samples H-Town's "Back Seat (Wit No Sheets)" and, unlike "Lumberjack", bears a close resemblance to his recent, more soulful albums. On June 23, 2021, Tyler released another teaser for the album in the form of a self-directed comedy sketch titled "Brown Sugar Salmon". The video features Tyler, referred to as "Sir Baudelaire", on a train attempting to order a meal without success.

Following the album's release on June 25, 2021, Tyler released a video to accompany the track "Juggernaut". Though it does include the guest verses from Lil Uzi Vert and Pharrell Williams, only Tyler himself appears in the video. On June 29, 2021, Tyler released a music video for "Corso". In the video, Tyler is performing at a birthday party in the company of DJ Drama. On July 8, 2021, Tyler released a music video for "Lemonhead". The video does not include the guest verse from 42 Dugg.

=== Tour ===
On August 3, 2021, Tyler announced the Call Me If You Get Lost Tour starting on February 8, 2022, in Phoenix at Footprint Center and concluding on August 3, 2022, in Melbourne at Rod Laver Arena. The North American leg with approximately 35 shows was supported by Kali Uchis, Vince Staples, and Teezo Touchdown.

=== The Estate Sale ===
On March 27, 2023, Tyler revealed Call Me If You Get Lost: The Estate Sale, which would include songs recorded for Call Me If You Get Lost but did not appear on the final album, including the single "Dogtooth", which was released on the day of the announcement, alongside a music video. On Twitter, Tyler stated that "Call Me If You Get Lost was the first album I made with a lot of songs that didn't make the final cut". On March 29, 2023, another single "Sorry Not Sorry" was released, alongside a music video. The Estate Sale was released on March 31, 2023, along with a music video for the song "Wharf Talk".

== Critical reception ==
Call Me If You Get Lost ratings
Aggregate scores
Source	Rating
AnyDecentMusic?	8.4/10
Metacritic	88/100
Review scores
Source	Rating
AllMusic	4.5/5 stars
Clash	8/10
Evening Standard	4/5 stars
Exclaim!	9/10
Financial Times	4/5 stars
The Guardian	5/5 stars
The Independent	5/5 stars
NME	4/5 stars
Pitchfork	8.4/10
Rolling Stone	4/5 stars

Call Me If You Get Lost was met with widespread critical acclaim. At Metacritic, which assigns a normalized rating out of 100 to reviews from professional publications, the album received an average score of 88, based on 20 reviews. Aggregator AnyDecentMusic? gave it 8.4 out of 10, based on their assessment of the critical consensus.

The Independent's Roisin O'Connor gave Call Me If You Get Lost five out of five stars, and said it feels like "the apotheosis of all Tyler's past works." They also noted the seamless transitions between tracks. Clash praised Tyler's "refusal to be caged in by any set sound or genre" and noted tracks "Sweet / I Thought You Wanted to Dance" and "Wilshire" as standouts. David Smyth of the Evening Standard mentioned the album's varied "global" sound and said, "Tyler's music is as fascinating as ever." Alexis Petridis of The Guardian wrote that bursts of "kaleidoscopic synth-pop, soul balladry and jazz sweep you", saying that the album could "take a lot of time to fully unpick, but clearly isn't going to diminish in quality if you do so." Ryan Rosenberger of The Line of Best Fit said, "Time will tell exactly where this album lands in Tyler, The Creator's discography, but Call Me If You Get Lost is yet another memorable record from Wolf Haley himself, one that only further cements his status as one of the best artists of his generation". Luke Morgan Britton from NME enjoyed the album, saying, "The iconoclast confronts cancel culture, his own controversial past and the notion of personal growth on a kaleidoscopic record that reaffirms his greatness". Pitchfork critic Paul A. Thompson said, "It grants him the freedom to play with tone, to write personally or use his gravelly voice as texture, to treat the harshest raps and the most delicate hooks as mad experiments gone wrong". Wesley McLean of Exclaim! said, "Tyler has delivered a project that yet again pushes the boundaries of his music while simultaneously being a culmination of everything that he's done so far. It's yet another impressive outing for an artist whose reign doesn't seem to be stopping any time soon".

Sofie Lindevall of Gigwise summarized: "With his sixth studio album Call Me If You Get Lost, Tyler turns everything up-side-down again, resulting in one of the most dynamic and interesting entries in his discography so far." A positive review by Craig Jenkins of Vulture concluded with telling the reader to "Look between the many detailed descriptions of Rolls-Royce interiors, beautiful boats, and international travel, beyond the over half-a-dozen mentions of passports," and that they'll find, "A love story". Paste magazine's Matt Mitchell gave Call Me If You Get Lost an 8.7 out of 10, and said the crowning achievement of the record is "the way it sharply reminds every listener that the early entries in an artist's discography are not parts of their past meant to be forgotten". Reviewing the album for AllMusic, David Crone claimed that, "Tyler's music has always been a patchwork of ever-increasing palettes, and CMIYGL is his most complex to date." Rolling Stone's Jeff Ihaza summarised Tyler's effort as a maturing into "some of the more compelling rap music being made today", calling Call Me If You Get Lost Tyler's best work to date.

=== Rankings ===
Select rankings of Call Me If You Get Lost
Publication	List	Rank	Ref.
Billboard	The 50 Best Albums of 2021	2	
Complex	The Best Albums of 2021	1	
Entertainment Weekly	The 10 Best (and 3 Worst) Albums of 2021	4	
Exclaim!	50 Best Albums of 2021	4	
The Guardian	The 50 Best Albums of 2021	5	
The New York Times	Jon Pareles' Best Albums of 2021	10	
The New York Times	Jon Caramanica's Best Albums of 2021	8	
The New York Times	Lindsay Zoladz's Best Albums of 2021	2	
NME	The 50 Best Albums of 2021	5	
Paste	The 50 Best Albums of 2021	6	
Pitchfork	The 50 Best Albums of 2021	3	
Rolling Stone	The 50 Best Albums of 2021	4	
Rolling Stone	The 20 Best Hip-Hop Albums of 2021	3	
Rolling Stone	The 200 Greatest Hip-Hop Albums of All Time	46	

=== Industry awards ===
Awards and nominations for Call Me If You Get Lost
Ceremony	Year	Category	Result	Ref.
BET Hip Hop Awards	2021	Album of the Year	Won	
BET Awards	2022	Album of the Year	Nominated	
Grammy Awards	2022	Best Rap Album	Won	

== Commercial performance ==
Call Me If You Get Lost debuted at number one on the US Billboard 200 chart, earning 169,000 album-equivalent units (including 55,000 copies in pure album sales) in its first week. This became Tyler's second US number-one album. The album also accumulated a total of 152.96 million on-demand streams of the album's tracks. It spent two non-consecutive weeks at number one, topping the chart for a second week the following April after the vinyl release. With 49,000 copies sold that week, it holds the largest vinyl sales week for a hip hop album. On October 28, 2025, the album was certified double platinum by the Recording Industry Association of America (RIAA) for combined sales and album-equivalent units of over 2,000,000 units in the United States. Call Me If You Get Lost is the first and only album to hit number one on the Top R&B/Hip-Hop Albums chart in three different years. The first time was in July 2021 during the initial release, then in April 2022 following the release of its vinyl LP counterpart, and then in April 2023 due to the release of its deluxe The Estate Sale edition.

Thirteen of the album's songs reached the US Billboard Hot 100, with "WusYaName" reaching the top 20 of the chart.

== Track listing ==
All tracks are solely produced by Tyler, the Creator, except for "Rise!", produced with Jamie xx; "Safari", produced with Jay Versace; and "What a Day", produced by Madlib.

Call Me If You Get Lost track listing
No.	Title	Writer(s)	Length
1.	"Sir Baudelaire" (featuring DJ Drama)	Tyler Okonma; Billy Cobham^{[a]}	1:28
2.	"Corso"	Okonma; James Asher^{[b]}	2:26
3.	"Lemonhead" (featuring 42 Dugg)	Okonma; Dion Hayes	2:10
4.	"WusYaName" (featuring YoungBoy Never Broke Again and Ty Dolla Sign)	Okonma; Kentrell Gaulden; Tyrone Griffin, Jr.; Bishop Burrell, Sr.^{[c]}; Delando Conner^{[c]}; Solomon Conner^{[c]}; Darryl Jackson^{[c]}	2:01
5.	"Lumberjack"	Okonma; Larry Willis^{[d]}; Anthony Ian Berkeley^{[d]}; Arnold Hamilton^{[d]}; Paul Huston^{[d]}; Robert Diggs^{[d]}	2:18
6.	"Hot Wind Blows" (featuring Lil Wayne)	Okonma; Dwayne Carter, Jr.; Henry Mancini^{[e]}; Norman Gimbel^{[e]}	2:35
7.	"Massa"	Okonma	3:43
8.	"RunItUp" (featuring Teezo Touchdown)	Okonma; Aaron Thomas	3:49
9.	"Manifesto" (featuring Domo Genesis)	Okonma; Dominique Cole; Barry White^{[f]}	2:55
10.	"Sweet / I Thought You Wanted to Dance" (featuring Brent Faiyaz and Fana Hues)	Okonma; Christopher Wood; Fana Hughes; Fil Callender^{[g]}	9:48
11.	"Momma Talk"	Okonma	1:10
12.	"Rise!" (featuring Daisy World)	Okonma; Daisy Hamel-Buffa; James Smith	3:23
13.	"Blessed"	Okonma	0:57
14.	"Juggernaut" (featuring Lil Uzi Vert and Pharrell Williams)	Okonma; Symere Woods; Williams	2:26
15.	"Wilshire"	Okonma	8:35
16.	"Safari"	Okonma; Jahlil Gunter	2:57
Total length:			52:41

Vinyl and CD release (both versions)
No.	Title	Writer(s)	Length
16.	"Fishtail"	Okonma; Alvin Worthy^{[h]}; Amber Croskey^{[h]}; Thomas Paladino^{[h]}; Eliot Dubock^{[h]}	3:25
Total length:			53:09

Call Me If You Get Lost: The Estate Sale track listing
No.	Title	Writer(s)	Length
17.	"Everything Must Go"	Okonma	0:28
18.	"Stuntman" (featuring Vince Staples)	Okonma; Vincent Staples	3:20
19.	"What a Day"	Okonma; Michał Urbaniak^{[i]}; Otis Jackson	3:37
20.	"Wharf Talk" (featuring ASAP Rocky)	Okonma; Rakim Mayers	3:24
21.	"Dogtooth"	Okonma	2:41
22.	"Heaven to Me"	Okonma; Alexandra Brown^{[j]}; Jessyca Wilson^{[j]}; John Stephens^{[j]}; Kanye West^{[j]}; Milton Bland^{[j]}; Vaughn Stephens^{[j]}	3:51
23.	"Boyfriend, Girlfriend (2020 Demo)" (featuring YG)	Okonma; Cecil Lyde^{[k]}; Keenon Jackson	3:24
24.	"Sorry Not Sorry"	Okonma; Franchone Shells^{[l]}; Lucille White^{[l]}	3:26
Total length:			77:02

=== Notes ===
- "Lemonhead" features uncredited spoken word by Frank Ocean
- On vinyl and CD releases of The Estate Sale, "Safari" is absent and is replaced with "Fishtail".

=== Sample credits ===
- ^{^[a]} "Sir Baudelaire" contains excerpts from "Siesta", written and performed by Billy Cobham; and an uncredited sample of "Michael Irvin", performed by Westside Gunn.
- ^{^[b]} "Corso" contains excerpts from "Oriental Workload", written and performed by James Asher.
- ^{^[c]} "WusYaName" contains samples from "Back Seat (Wit No Sheets)", written by Bishop Burrell Sr., Solomon Conner, Delando Conner, and Darryl Jackson, performed by H-Town.
- ^{^[d]} "Lumberjack" contains excerpts from "Inner Crisis", written and performed by Larry Willis; samples from "2 Cups of Blood", written by Anthony Ian Berkeley, Arnold Hamilton, Paul Huston, and Robert Diggs, performed by Gravediggaz; and excerpts from "Hihache", performed by Lafayette Afro Rock Band.
- ^{^[e]} "Hot Wind Blows" contains excerpts from "Slow Hot Wind", written by Henry Mancini and Norman Gimbel, performed by Penny Goodwin.
- "Massa" contains excerpts from "If It's in You to Do Wrong", performed by The Impressions.
- ^{^[f]} "Manifesto" contains samples from "I'm Gonna Love You Just a Little More Babe", written by Barry White, performed by Jimmy Smith.
- ^{^[g]} "Sweet / I Thought You Wanted to Dance" contains excerpts from "Is Anyone There?", performed by Hookfoot; and "Baby My Love", written by Fil Callender, performed by the In Crowd and Jah Stitch.
- "Safari" contains excerpts from "Farewell My Love", written by Marvin Redding and performed by Ebony Expressions.
- ^{^[h]} "Fishtail" contains excerpts from "Lessie", written by Alvin Worthy, Amber Croskey, Thomas Paladino, and Eliot Dubock, performed by Westside Gunn.
- ^{^[i]} "What a Day" contains excerpts from "A Day in the Park", written and performed by Michał Urbaniak.
- ^{^[j]} "Heaven to Me" contains excerpts from "Heaven", written by Alexandra Brown, Jessyca Wilson, John Stephens, Kanye West, and Vaughn Stephens, performed by John Legend, which itself samples "Heaven Only Knows", written and performed by Monk Higgins.
- ^{^[k]} "Boyfriend, Girlfriend (2020 Demo)" contains excerpts from "Happy Feeling", written and performed by Cecil Lyde.
- ^{^[l]} "Sorry Not Sorry" contains excerpts from "He Made You Mine", written by Franchone Shells and Lucille White, performed by Brighter Side of Darkness.

== Personnel ==
Credits are adapted from the album's liner notes.

=== Musicians ===
- Fabian Chavez – flute (tracks 1, 6, 7, 11, 16)
- Devon "Jasper" Wilson – additional vocals (track 2)
- Lionel Boyce – additional vocals (tracks 2, 5)
- Vic Wainstein – additional vocals (track 2)
- Domo Genesis – additional vocals (track 5)
- Travis "Taco" Bennett – additional vocals (track 5)
- DJ Drama – hosting

=== Producers and engineers ===
- Tyler, the Creator – production (all tracks), recording (tracks 1–5, 7–8, 12–13, 16), executive production
- Jamie xx – production (track 12)
- Jay Versace – production (track 16)
- Madlib – production (track 19)
- Vic Wainstein – recording (tracks 2–9, 12–16)
- Jason Goldberg – recording (track 4)
- Mike Larson – recording (track 14)
- Gregory Scott – assistance (tracks 2, 8, 15)
- Ben Fletcher – assistance (tracks 3–5)
- Bobby Mota – assistance (tracks 4, 9)
- Jonathan Pfarr – assistance (tracks 4, 9)
- Josh Sellers – assistance (track 6)
- Robert N. Johnson – assistance (tracks 7, 16)
- Sam Morton – assistance (track 12)
- Neal H Pogue – mixing
- Zachary Acosta – mixing assistance
- Mike Bozzi – mastering

=== Artwork ===
- Darren Vongphakdy – art direction
- Wolf Haley – art direction
- Luis "Panch" Perez – cover photography

== Charts ==
=== Weekly charts ===
Weekly chart performance for Call Me If You Get Lost
Chart (2021–2024)	Peak position
Australian Albums (ARIA)	2
Austrian Albums (Ö3 Austria)	6
Belgian Albums (Ultratop Flanders)	5
Belgian Albums (Ultratop Wallonia)	8
Canadian Albums (Billboard)	3
Danish Albums (Hitlisten)	3
Dutch Albums (Album Top 100)	4
Finnish Albums (Suomen virallinen lista)	7
French Albums (SNEP)	32
German Albums (Offizielle Top 100)	10
Greek Albums (IFPI)	58
Hungarian Physical Albums (MAHASZ)	29
Irish Albums (Official Charts)	3
Italian Albums (FIMI)	32
Lithuanian Albums (AGATA)	3
New Zealand Albums (RMNZ)	2
Norwegian Albums (VG-lista)	4
Polish Albums (ZPAV)	45
Portuguese Albums (AFP)	4
Scottish Albums (Official Charts)	13
Spanish Albums (Promusicae)	20
Swedish Albums (Sverigetopplistan)	10
Swiss Albums (Schweizer Hitparade)	4
UK Albums (Official Charts)	4
UK R&B Albums (Official Charts)	2
US Billboard 200	1
US Top R&B/Hip-Hop Albums (Billboard)	1

Weekly chart performance for Call Me If You Get Lost: The Estate Sale
Chart (2023)	Peak position
Danish Albums (Hitlisten)	21
Lithuanian Albums (AGATA)	9
Norwegian Albums (VG-lista)	8
Polish Albums (ZPAV)	64

=== Year-end charts ===
2021 year-end chart performance for Call Me If You Get Lost
Chart (2021)	Position
US Billboard 200	111
US Top R&B/Hip-Hop Albums (Billboard)	49

2022 year-end chart performance for Call Me If You Get Lost
Chart (2022)	Position
Australian Albums (ARIA)	96
US Billboard 200	112
US Top R&B/Hip-Hop Albums (Billboard)	71

2023 year-end chart performance for Call Me If You Get Lost
Chart (2023)	Position
US Billboard 200	57
US Top R&B/Hip-Hop Albums (Billboard)	41

2025 year-end chart performance for Call Me If You Get Lost
Chart (2025)	Position
US Top R&B/Hip-Hop Albums (Billboard)	92

== Certifications ==
Certifications for Call Me If You Get Lost
Region	Certification	Certified units/sales
Canada (Music Canada)	Gold	40,000^{‡}
Denmark (IFPI Danmark)	Gold	10,000^{‡}
France (SNEP)	Gold	50,000^{‡}
New Zealand (RMNZ)	Platinum	15,000^{‡}
Norway (IFPI Norway)	Gold	10,000^{‡}
Poland (ZPAV)	Gold	10,000^{‡}
United Kingdom (BPI)	Gold	100,000^{‡}
United States (RIAA)	2× Platinum	2,000,000^{‡}
^{‡} Sales+streaming figures based on certification alone.
