= Crazy Life (Anna of the North album) =

Studio album by Anna of the North
- Released: 4 November 2022
- Length: 36:32
- Label: Honeymoon

Anna of the North chronology
Believe (2020)	Crazy Life (2022)	Hei På Deg (2025)

Singles from Crazy Life
- 1. "Meteorite" Released: 11 May 2022; 2. "Dandelion" Released: 29 June 2022; 3. "Bird Sing" Released: 26 August 2022; 4. "Nobody" Released: 23 September 2022; 5. "I Do You" Released: 21 October 2022; 6. "Swirl" Released: 17 February 2023; 7. "Try My Best" Released: 31 March 2023

Professional ratings
Review scores
Source	Rating
DIY	3/5 stars
Gigwise	6/10 stars

Crazy Life is the third studio album by Anna of the North released on 4 November 2022 by Honeymoon Records. It contains eleven songs and it was promoted by the singles "Meteorite" (with Gus Dapperton), "Dandelion", "Bird Sing", "Nobody", and "I Do You". A deluxe edition of the album that adds three extra songs was later released on 28 April 2023 by Elektra Records.

== Track listing ==
Crazy Life track listing
No.	Title	Length
1.	"Bird Sing"	3:11
2.	"I Do You"	3:45
3.	"Nobody"	3:49
4.	"Listen"	3:06
5.	"Living Life Right"	3:13
6.	"Red Light"	3:17
7.	"No Good Without U"	3:08
8.	"Dandelion"	2:44
9.	"Meteorite" (with Gus Dapperton)	3:15
10.	"60 Seconds"	3:23
11.	"Let Go"	3:33
Total length:		36:32

Crazy Life (Deluxe) track listing
No.	Title	Length
12.	"Swirl"	3:17
13.	"Ridin"	2:55
14.	"Try My Best"	3:47
Total length:		46:31
