= Fana Hues =

American R&B singer-songwriter

- Born: Fana Subira Hughes; June 15, 1995 (age 31); Pasadena, California, U.S.
- Genres: R&B
- Occupations: Singer; songwriter; multi-instrumentalist
- Years active: 2020-present
- Labels: Bright Antenna Records; Sweet Virtue; Westminster Recordings
- Website: fanahues.com

Fana Subira Hughes (born June 15, 1995), known professionally as Fana Hues, is an American R&B singer, songwriter and multi-instrumentalist from Pasadena, California. Hues gained prominence in 2021 after being featured on the Tyler, the Creator song "Sweet / I Thought You Wanted to Dance".

== Early life ==
Fana Hues was born in 1995 and raised into a musical family in Pasadena. While growing up, she was unable to sing for five years as a child, due to a crippling combination of scarlet fever, tonsillitis, and strep throat. After years of not being able to sing because of her condition, Hues was able to find her voice through years of practice and with the support of her close-knit family.

== Career ==
Fana Hues started her career singing and performing in her family's band. In 2020, she released her debut single, "Notice Me", which she said was inspired by her growing up. The same year, she released her debut album, Hues. Since then, she has released additional singles, including "Breakfast", which she performed on ColorsxStudios. In 2021, Hues was featured on Tyler, The Creator's song "Sweet / I Thought You Wanted to Dance" from his 2021 album Call Me If You Get Lost. Her second studio album, Flora + Fana, was released on 25 March 2022, with the deluxe edition released the same year. Fana has toured across the US with artists like Raveena, Snoh Alegra, Lucky Daye, and Giveon. Hues released her third album, Moth, on June 14, 2024. In 2025, Hues headlined her Matters of the Heart tour, visiting 14 cities across North America. Her EP Catch n' Release was released on August 4, 2026.

== Discography ==
- Hues (2020)
- Flora + Fana (2022)
- Moth (2024)
- Catch n' Release (2026)
