= Get Free (Lana Del Rey song) =

2017 song by Lana Del Rey

Song by Lana Del Rey

from the album Lust for Life
- Released: July 21, 2017
- Recorded: March 10, 2017
- Studio: The Green Building (Los Angeles, CA); Hampstead Studios (London, England)
- Length: 5:34
- Label: Interscope; Polydor
- Songwriters: Elizabeth Grant; Rick Nowels; Kieron Menzies
- Producers: Grant; Nowels; Menzies; Dean Reid

Audio
- "Get Free" on YouTube

"Get Free" is a song by American singer and songwriter Lana Del Rey from her fifth studio album, Lust for Life (2017). The song was written by Del Rey, Rick Nowels, and Kieron Menzies, all of whom produced the song with Dean Reid. Del Rey performed the song various times, most notably on her LA to the Moon Tour in 2018.

In January 2018, Del Rey confirmed speculation that Radiohead had filed a copyright lawsuit against her and her team for alleged similarities between "Get Free" and their hit song, "Creep".

== Background ==
According to Del Rey, the song was originally recorded under the title "Malibu" and was completely different in the original recording, being far more revealing about Del Rey and her life over the past 6 years. Evidently, Del Rey scrapped that version of the song and decided to make a lighter record out of the original instrumental. During a 2018 interview for World Cafe, Del Rey shared the sentiment behind the song: "It's about people who don't get to reach their full potential because they let controlling people stop them from being free."

== Radiohead lawsuit ==
In January 2018, Del Rey said on Twitter that the band Radiohead was taking legal action against her for allegedly plagiarising their 1992 song "Creep" on "Get Free". According to Del Rey, Radiohead asked for 100% of publishing royalties instead of Del Rey's offer of 40%. She denied that "Creep" had inspired "Get Free".

Radiohead's publisher, Warner Chappell Music, confirmed it was seeking songwriting credit for "all writers" of "Creep", but denied that a lawsuit had been brought or that Radiohead had demanded 100% of royalties. In March, Del Rey told an audience that "my lawsuit's over, I guess I can sing that song any time I want". The writing credits for "Get Free" were not updated on the database of the American Society of Composers, Authors, and Publishers.

In an analysis, The Guardian found that the chords used in "Creep" were rare in pop music and that the melodies bore an "uncanny resemblance". Publications compared it to the dispute of similarities between TLC's "No Scrubs" and Ed Sheeran's "Shape of You" and the Marvin Gaye estate's lawsuit with Pharrell Williams and Robin Thicke over similarities between "Blurred Lines" and Gaye's "Got to Give It Up". In the 1990s, Radiohead were sued over "Creep"'s similarity to the 1972 song "The Air That I Breathe", written by Albert Hammond and Mike Hazlewood; Hammond and Hazlewood received cowriting credits and a percentage of the royalties.

== Credits and personnel ==
Credits adapted from the liner notes of Lust for Life.

Performance

- Lana Del Rey – primary artist

Instruments

- Lana Del Rey – production
- Rick Nowels – bass, keyboards, synth pads, organs
- Kieron Menzies – tape loops, percussion, synthesizer
- Dean Reid – electric guitar, synth bass
- Zac Rae – synthesizer, organ, Mellotron, guitar
- Mighty Mike – drums, percussion
- David Levita – electric guitar
- Trevor Yasuda – keyboards
- Aaron Sterling – live drums, percussion

Engineering

- Kieron Menzies – production, engineering, mixing
- Dean Reid – production, engineering, mixing
- Trevor Yasuda – engineering
- Chris Garcia – engineering
- Adam Ayan – mastering

== Charts ==
Chart (2017)	Peak position
US Hot Rock Songs (Billboard)	20

== Certifications ==
Certifications for "Get Free"
Region	Certification	Certified units/sales
Canada (Music Canada)	Gold	40,000^{‡}
^{‡} Sales+streaming figures based on certification alone.
