= Tomorrow Never Came =

Song by Lana Del Rey featuring Sean Ono Lennon

from the album Lust for Life
- Released: July 21, 2017
- Recorded: March 10, 2017
- Studio: Hampstead Studios (London, England); The Farm (New York, NY)
- Genre: Folk rock
- Length: 5:07
- Label: Interscope; Polydor
- Songwriters: Elizabeth Grant; Sean Ono Lennon; Rick Nowels
- Producers: Grant; Lennon; Nowels

Licensed audio
- "Tomorrow Never Came" on YouTube

"Tomorrow Never Came" is a song by American singer and songwriter Lana Del Rey from her fifth studio album, Lust for Life, released in 2017. The song features vocals from American-British musician Sean Ono Lennon, who co-wrote and co-produced the song alongside Del Rey and Rick Nowels.

== Background ==
A collaboration with Lennon was first hinted at in March 2017 in the Lust for Life album trailer, which featured the emblem of his record label Chimera Music. While speaking about her decision to do the song with Lennon, Del Rey explained to Flaunt Magazine that "I thought it might be strange for Sean to sing a song about John and Yoko as well. But I think the fact that I sing, ‘Isn’t life crazy now that I’m singing with Sean.’ It points to the fact that we’re both aware. I didn't want it to come out exploitative in any fashion. Not that it would. Still, I wanted to be as careful as possible. I wanted it to come across layered with this sort of meta narrative mixed in. In a way it's a song about a song." Del Rey later expressed her shock at his interest in recording the song with her due to their sounds being so different. Having never considered himself a singer before, Lennon said the experience caused him to feel more satisfied with his vocal ability.

In 2018, snippets of an early version and a full alternate take leaked online. Both versions featured a different bridge, with bleaker lyrics which declare "baby, you have to forget/and I have to move on" as opposed to "isn't life crazy, I said/Now that I'm singing with Sean?" Jeremy Gordon of Spin compared the song to The Beatles' "Tomorrow Never Knows", declaring it to be an unofficial sequel.

== Composition and lyrics ==
Described as a folk rock song, it tells a story of two estranged lovers who hope to reunite, though the lyrics indicate that a future together is unlikely. To complement the melancholic lyrics, the instrumental is rather simple and subdued, relying mainly on sparse acoustic and electric guitars, an electric upright bass, and light percussion. The song features references to Lennon's parents, John Lennon and Yoko Ono.

== Credits and personnel ==
Credits adapted from the liner notes of Lust for Life.

- Lana Del Rey – primary artist, production, composition
- Sean Ono Lennon – featured artist, production, composition, shaker, timpani, electric upright bass, acoustic guitar, electric guitar, celesta, harpsichord, glass harmonica, Mongolian bells, Mellotron
- Rick Nowels – production, composition, bass, Mellotron, vibraphone, organ, acoustic guitar
- Patrick Warren – piano, organ
- David Levita – electric guitar
- Trevor Yasuda – keyboards, engineering
- Matthew Cullen – engineering
- Adam Ayan – mastering

== Charts ==
| Chart (2017) | Peak position |
|---|---|
| US Hot Rock Songs (Billboard) | 40 |
