= Lovers (Anna of the North album) =

Studio album by Anna of the North
- Released: 8 September 2017
- Genre: Synth-pop
- Length: 36:40
- Label: Honeymoon
- Producer: Brady Daniell-Smith

Anna of the North chronology
Lovers (2017)	Dream Girl (2019)

Singles from Lovers
- 1. "Baby" Released: 24 March 2016; 2. "Lovers" Released: 31 May 2017; 3. "Someone" Released: 30 June 2017; 4. "Money" Released: 16 August 2017; 5. "Fire" Released: 23 August 2017

Professional ratings
Aggregate scores
Source	Rating
Metacritic	80/100
Review scores
Source	Rating
Drowned in Sound	3/5 stars
The Line of Best Fit	4/5 stars
The Skinny	4/5 stars

Lovers is the debut studio album by Norwegian singer Anna of the North, released on 8 September 2017 by Honeymoon Records. It was preceded by the 5 singles "Baby", "Lovers", "Someone", "Money", and "Fire".

== Track listing ==
All tracks are written by Anna Lotterud and Brady Daniell-Smith.

Lovers track listing
No.	Title	Length
1.	"Moving On"	4:42
2.	"Someone"	3:47
3.	"Lovers"	3:36
4.	"Money"	3:02
5.	"Always"	3:56
6.	"Feels"	4:37
7.	"Baby"	3:26
8.	"Friends"	3:25
9.	"Fire"	2:46
10.	"All I Want"	3:23
Total length:		36:40

== Charts ==
Chart performance for Lovers
Chart (2017)	Peak position
Belgian Albums (Ultratop Flanders)	140
