= Rosaline (soundtrack) =

Rosaline (Original Soundtrack)

Soundtrack album by Drum & Lace and Ian Hultquist
- Released: October 14, 2022
- Recorded: 2022
- Genre: Film score
- Length: 49:38
- Label: Hollywood

Drum & Lace chronology
Look Both Ways (2022)	Rosaline (2022)	Cobweb (2023)

Ian Hultquist chronology
One of Us Is Lying (2022)	Rosaline (2022)	The Walking Dead: Dead City (2023)

Rosaline (Original Soundtrack) is the soundtrack to the 2022 film Rosaline directed by Karen Maine. The film is scored by Ian Hultquist, who previously scored Maine's Yes, God, Yes (2019) and joined with his wife Sofia Hultquist, who was credited under her stage name Drum & Lace. The score was composed using traditional instruments which had been experimented with synthesisers to give the score a "pop music" feel and also highlight the comedic moments in the film, which was different from the darker themes in the original play, the film is based on. The score was released by Hollywood Records on October 14, 2022.

== Development ==
"The way the Romeo & Juliet traditional story plays into it is very tongue-in-cheek. There are a few lines in the movie where they kind of joke about the fact that the way the original story goes is. So there are a lot of comedic moments where they remind you of the original story, but this is a completely flipped-on-its-head narrative, which is why I think it was so much fun."

— Sofia Hultquist on the context of the film

Ian and Sofia read the script before signing the film, and felt the score to be fresh, exciting and funny but also wanted to have a lot of emotion. He felt that scoring comedy was more challenging than scoring a drama, as "it needs comic timing to keep very much in mind" and need to find strong themes to build familiarity with the characters and play up with the emotional arcs happening onscreen.

He also wanted to have the renaissance style of music. Hence, Sofia and Ian integrated traditional instruments such as harpsichord, lute, wooden flutes, renaissance drums and several others into a score of pop sensibility. The duo further researched on various instruments, to match the appropriate timeline and during the recording sessions he requested the contractor to find musicians having familiarity with period music. The session held with three woodwind players and given a plethora of Baroque flutes, on various shapes and sizes and during the course of recording, they changed the configuration of different blends and flutes and mixed them to feel interesting. Initially, they planned for a 30-member string section, but was reduced to 15 members to narrow down the actual sound of the film.

The "Scheming" theme which was played throughout the film consisted of staccato and pizzicato motifs. They used loot, harp, chimes and traditional flutes as lot of synths appear in the "actual romance" when Rosaline has deep feelings, the vocals and synth play through. He further created analog synths, drum machines, soft synths, pianos and vocals to serve the sonic palette.

In addition to the score, the duo also reworked the tunes of the pop tracks "Dancing On My Own" by Robyn, "Escape" by Enrique Iglesias and "It Must Have Been Love" by Roxette, which has been featured in the film, using renaissance-era instruments. Norwegian singer-songwriter Anna of the North whom provided vocals to the score, had recorded the cover of "Dancing On My Own" and "Escape". She further added that "[it] gave her a chance to show her music in a different light and give her unique spin to Robyn’s hit".

== Track listing ==
No.	Title	Artist(s)	Length
1.	"A Really Long Time Ago"	Drum & Lace; Ian Hultquist	1:23
2.	"This Behemoth"	Drum & Lace; Ian Hultquist	0:30
3.	"You Teach the Torches"	Drum & Lace; Ian Hultquist	0:54
4.	"Can I Tell You a Secret"	Drum & Lace; Ian Hultquist	0:40
5.	"Dancing On My Own"	Anna of the North; Drum & Lace; Ian Hultquist	3:57
6.	"It Must Have Been Love"	Drum & Lace; Ian Hultquist	1:36
7.	"Escape"	Anna of the North; Drum & Lace; Ian Hultquist	3:30
8.	"Thanks for That and Only That"	Drum & Lace; Ian Hultquist	1:00
9.	"Lover's Detour"	Drum & Lace; Ian Hultquist	1:30
10.	"All by Myself"	Drum & Lace; Ian Hultquist	0:52
11.	"Sweet Little Juliet"	Drum & Lace; Ian Hultquist	0:56
12.	"Croquet"	Drum & Lace; Ian Hultquist	0:56
13.	"You're Not the First"	Drum & Lace; Ian Hultquist	0:55
14.	"Ros & Juliet Montage"	Drum & Lace; Ian Hultquist	2:36
15.	"You Need to Go"	Drum & Lace; Ian Hultquist	1:05
16.	"You Marry Her"	Drum & Lace; Ian Hultquist	1:38
17.	"The Boy Is Mine"	Drum & Lace; Ian Hultquist	2:20
18.	"The Note"	Drum & Lace; Ian Hultquist	0:46
19.	"I Don't Need an Escort"	Drum & Lace; Ian Hultquist	1:03
20.	"Vineyard Chase"	Drum & Lace; Ian Hultquist	0:35
21.	"Barracks Fight"	Drum & Lace; Ian Hultquist	0:44
22.	"Horse Escape"	Drum & Lace; Ian Hultquist	1:29
23.	"Dario Leaves"	Drum & Lace; Ian Hultquist	1:09
24.	"Your Friend, Rosaline"	Drum & Lace; Ian Hultquist	1:35
25.	"The Daughter I Wish You Were"	Drum & Lace; Ian Hultquist	0:35
26.	"Mind the Fish"	Drum & Lace; Ian Hultquist	2:11
27.	"A Montague & a Capulet"	Drum & Lace; Ian Hultquist	1:51
28.	"You Can Wake Up Now"	Drum & Lace; Ian Hultquist	1:11
29.	"Setting Sail"	Drum & Lace; Ian Hultquist	1:04
30.	"Kiss on the Dock"	Drum & Lace; Ian Hultquist	1:18
Total length:			41:49

== Reception ==
Tara Bennett of IGN complimented it as a "frothy score". Gissane Sophia of Marvelous Geeks Media reviewed that the soundtrack "matches its vigor with all the right beats, making it one that we’ll turn to often". Courtney Howard of The A.V. Club wrote "composers Drum & Lace and Ian Hultquist, even drop a winking nod to Clueless for kicks and giggles."
