= Groupie Love =

2017 song by Lana Del Rey

Single by Lana Del Rey featuring ASAP Rocky

from the album Lust for Life
- Released: July 28, 2017
- Studio: Hampstead Studios (London, England); The Green Building (Los Angeles, CA)
- Genre: Pop; hip-hop; blue-eyed soul; folk; trap
- Length: 4:24
- Label: Polydor; Interscope
- Songwriters: Lana Del Rey; Rick Nowels; ASAP Rocky
- Producers: Lana Del Rey; Emile Haynie; Rick Nowels; Kieron Menzies; Hector Delgado; Dean Reid

Lana Del Rey singles chronology
"Summer Bummer" (2017)	"Groupie Love" (2017)	"God Save Our Young Blood" (2018)

ASAP Rocky singles chronology
"Summer Bummer" (2017)	"Groupie Love" (2017)	"No Limit" (2017)

Licensed audio
- "Groupie Love" on YouTube

"Groupie Love" is a song by American singer and songwriter Lana Del Rey featuring American rapper ASAP Rocky featured on her fifth studio album Lust for Life. The song was released for digital download on July 12, 2017, alongside "Summer Bummer", another collaboration between the two alongside Playboi Carti, as a promotional single with the pre-order of the album. The song was later sent to Italian radio on July 28, 2017 as the album's fourth single. The song was written by the artists and Rick Nowels, who produced it with Del Rey, Emile Haynie, Kieron Menzies, Hector Delgado, and Dean Reid.

== Critical reception ==
"Groupie Love" received mixed reviews from critics. Dan Weiss of Consequence of Sound criticized ASAP Rocky's contribution, saying that it "adds nothing" to the track. Ana Gaca of Spin said that "'Groupie Love' relegates Rocky to a pop song's standard third verse rap feature, where any supposed romantic chemistry falls flat. Del Rey's choruses are almost lush enough to sell a vision of vintage backstage hedonism, but she winds up tripping over the clichés she idolizes. The very first lines—"You're in the bar / Playing guitar"—should have been struck as soon as they were written."

Matt F of HotNewHipHop said that "Groupie Love" "captures a similar, gently warped vibe that her previous music has fostered over the years". Alexa Camp of Slant Magazine said that "Lana Del Rey's foray into hip-hop might seem long overdue, but judging by the languid tempos of "Summer Bummer" and "Groupie Love," the singer-songwriter is perfectly fine taking her sweet time." She also noted that, compared with "Summer Bummer", "Groupie Love" is more a retro-minded pop song featuring Del Rey's signature sonorous, reverb-coated vocals.

Odette Yiu of juice.com.sg described the song as a "soul-folk-trap melange that gets her point across. And from it all beams an effusive self-confidence and surety that is new to her oeuvre. "It's so sweet, / Swingin' to the beat / When I know that you're doing it / All for me," she croons, her voice sultry and seductive, the tone both transfixed and transfixing, and almost tauntingly knowing." Yiu also said that Rocky "plays so much more than second fiddle. He's the match to Lana's gushing oil wells and child-lipped, rose-eyed, ceaseless caresses of affection: The "You and I 'til the day we die" to her "It's like magic, babe, isn't life wonderful?" Gone are the dreary days of her Born to Die sadness.

== Track listing ==
Digital download
No.	Title	Length
1.	"Groupie Love"	4:24

== Credits ==
Credits adapted from Tidal.

Management

- Published by Sony/ATV Music Publishing (ASCAP)
- Published by A$AP Rocky Music Publishing LLC/Sony/ATV Songs LLC (BMI)
- Published by R-Rated Music administered by EMI April Music Inc (Global Music Rights)
- A$AP Rocky appears courtesy of A$AP Worldwide/Polo Grounds Music/RCA Records

Personnel

- Lana Del Rey – vocals, songwriting, production
- ASAP Rocky – vocals, songwriting
- Rick Nowels – songwriting, production, Mellotron, piano, synthesizer, synthesizer program, vibraphone
- Hector Delgado – production, engineering, keyboard, bass guitar, drums, percussion, synthesizer
- Kieron Menzies – production, engineering, keyboard, drums, mixing, percussion, synthesizer
- Dean Reid – production, engineering, bass guitar, vocoder, mixing, sound effects
- Trevor Yasuda – engineering, keyboards
- Patrick Warren – keyboards, piano, strings
- Zac Rae – keyboards, electric guitar
- David Levita – electric guitar
- Berkay Birecikli – percussion
- Mighty Mike – sound effects

== Charts ==
Chart (2017)	Peak position
France (SNEP)	141
New Zealand Heatseekers (RMNZ)	8
US Alternative Digital Songs (Billboard)	13

== Release history ==
Region	Date	Format	Label	Ref.
United States	July 12, 2017	Digital download; streaming	Interscope	
Italy	July 28, 2017	Contemporary hit radio	Polydor	
