= Summer Bummer =

Single by Lana Del Rey featuring ASAP Rocky and Playboi Carti

from the album Lust for Life
- Released: July 28, 2017
- Studio: Record Plant (Los Angeles, CA); Hampstead Studios (London, England)
- Genre: Hip hop; pop; trap
- Length: 4:21
- Label: Polydor; Interscope
- Songwriters: Lana Del Rey; Matthew Samuels; Rakim Mayers; Jordan Carter; Tyler Williams; Jahaan Sweet; Andrew Joseph Gradwohl Jr.
- Producers: Boi-1da; Sweet; Rick Nowels; T-Minus (co.); BigWhiteBeatz (co.)

Lana Del Rey singles chronology
"Lust for Life" (2017)	"Summer Bummer" (2017)	"Groupie Love" (2017)

ASAP Rocky singles chronology
"Who Dat Boy" (2017)	"Summer Bummer" (2017)	"Groupie Love" (2017)

Playboi Carti singles chronology
"Magnolia" (2017)	"Summer Bummer" (2017)	"Butterfly Coupe" (2017)

Licensed audio
- "Summer Bummer" on YouTube

"Summer Bummer" is a song by American singer and songwriter Lana Del Rey featuring American rappers ASAP Rocky and Playboi Carti featured on her fifth studio album Lust for Life. The song was released for digital download on July 12, 2017, alongside "Groupie Love" featuring ASAP Rocky, as a promotional single with the pre-order of the album. It was later sent to UK contemporary hit radio on July 28 as the album's third single. The song was written by the artists, alongside producers BigWhiteBeatz., Boi-1da, Jahaan Sweet, and T-Minus, with additional production credits going to Rick Nowels.

== Background and composition ==
On June 2, 2017, Del Rey revealed that she and ASAP Rocky had collaborated on a track for the album by posting a snippet of the song on Instagram with the caption: "We made a lot of good ones but I think we picked the best ones for the record".

According to the sheet music published at Musicnotes.com by Universal Music Publishing Group, "Summer Bummer" is composed in 4/4 time and the key of E-flat minor, with a relaxed trap/hip hop and electronica tempo of 67 beats per minute. "Summer Bummer" was labeled a hip hop song by Alexa Camp of Slant Magazine, while Ryan Reed of Rolling Stone described the sound of the song as "dark noir-pop style over a rattling trap beat".

== Critical reception ==
"Summer Bummer" received generally positive reviews from critics. Anna Gaca of Spin stated "Even as it widens—slightly—the range of her catalog, 'Summer Bummer' is best viewed as a classically Lana Del Rey set piece: a heavily stylized soundtrack for drugs, pools, and high-contrast monochromes. 'White lies'—or maybe that's, ahem, 'white lines'—'and black beaches/And blood red sangrias', she sings later, mirroring a color scheme that dates back to 'Off to the Races'. Sonically, 'Bummer' is like a trap-inspired take on Honeymoon's High by the Beach, and thematically, it doesn't go anywhere that song didn't already." Pitchfork's Rebecca Haithcoat said "[Summer Bummer] is not a traditional contender for the song-of-the-summer flower crown. It's sticky, but in a dense and oppressive, not light and carefree way. Even in Del Rey's songs with a cooler temperature, there's a humidity to her voice, a thickness that slows her tongue. Listless delivery paired with such vivid description is a hallmark of her work, and here it functions as a cocoon you don't want to escape even as you feel the knife's edge of danger. ASAP Rocky and Playboi Carti's contributions feel a little unnecessary, as Del Rey has no trouble carrying a track on her own. Near the end, her voice suddenly jumps an octave and, for a moment, floats sweetly atop the roiling fever dream."

Frank Guan of Vulture stated "Summer Bummer is about love. But the music on 'Bummer carries with it an unprecedented charge. Boi-1da and T-Minus, A-list producers renowned for their work with Drake and other rap artists, have laced Lana with a heat-dazed, shade-cooled beat, a banger situated halfway between beach and trap. It's a track that any rapper would be proud to surf over, and Rocky knows it, delivering a calmly boastful, well-tailored verse punctuated by a choice, subdued set of A$AP affiliate Playboi Carti's ad-libs. Meanwhile Lana's voice, passionate and aching yet effortless and chill, sings to a lover free to change yet fated to accept her love. Racial subtext slips in through lines about white lines and black beaches, though the real poetic highlight is the blood-red sangrias. After years in the dark, Lana's love with hip-hop is out in the open again, and like any love, it feels as if no time has passed at all." The Washington Post's Chris Richards claimed "The album's most narcotic single, Summer Bummer, is an echo of Del Rey's trademark hit, Summertime Sadness, only more evocative. Picture the singer idling around in the July heat, slowly typing out a telepathic love letter inside her skull. She's listening to the radio, and her mind is drifting between external sensation and internal desire. We hear the voices of Playboi Carti and A$AP Rocky splashing around the background—they're hip-hop in the summer, the song on the airwaves."

The song was ranked the 56th best song of 2017 by Noisey.

== Track listing ==
Digital download
No.	Title	Length
1.	"Summer Bummer" (featuring ASAP Rocky and Playboi Carti)	4:21

Digital download – Snakehips Remix
No.	Title	Length
1.	"Summer Bummer" (featuring ASAP Rocky and Playboi Carti) (Snakehips Remix)	4:08

Digital download – Clams Casino Rework
No.	Title	Length
1.	"Summer Bummer" (featuring ASAP Rocky and Playboi Carti) (Clams Casino Remix)	4:30

== Credits and personnel ==
Credits adapted from Lust for Life album liner notes.

Recording and management

- Recorded at Record Plant Studios (Los Angeles) and Hampstead Studios (London)
- Mastered at Gateway Mastering
- Published by 1Damentional Publishing (ASCAP), Sony/ATV Tunes LLC (ASCAP), A$AP Rocky Music Publishing LLC/Sony/ATV Songs LLC (BMI), Brother Bagz Publishing/Warner-Tamerlane Publishing Corp. (BMI), Jahaan Sweet Publishing Designee (BMI), Sony/ATV Music Publishing (ASCAP)
- A$AP Rocky appears courtesy of A$AP Worldwide/Polo Grounds Music/RCA Records
- Playboi Carti appears courtesy of AWGE/Interscope Records

Personnel

- Lana Del Rey – songwriter, lead vocals
- Matthew "Boi-1da" Samuels – songwriter, producer, drums, bass
- A$AP Rocky – songwriter, vocals
- Playboi Carti – songwriter, vocals
- Tyler "T-Minus" Williams – songwriter, cello, synth bass
- Jahaan Sweet – songwriter, producer, piano
- Andrew Joseph "Big White Beats" Gradwohl Jr. – songwriter, synthesizer
- Rick Nowels – additional producer, synthesizer
- Zac Rac – harpsichord
- Kieron Menzies – engineer, mixer
- Dean Reid – engineer, mixer
- Trevor Yasuda – engineer
- Hector Delgado – engineer
- Adam Ayan – mastering engineer

== Charts and certifications ==
=== Weekly charts ===
Chart (2017)	Peak position
Australia Urban (ARIA)	19
Belgium Urban (Ultratop Flanders)	40
Canada Hot 100 (Billboard)	80
New Zealand Heatseekers (Recorded Music NZ)	2
Scottish Singles Sales (Official Charts)	86
Sweden Heatseeker (Sverigetopplistan)	3
UK Singles (Official Charts)	81
US Bubbling Under Hot 100 (Billboard)	23

=== Certifications ===
Region	Certification	Certified units/sales
Australia (ARIA)	Gold	35,000^{‡}
United States (RIAA)	Gold	500,000^{‡}
^{‡} Sales+streaming figures based on certification alone.

== Release history ==
Release dates and formats for "Summer Bummer"
Region	Date	Format	Version	Label	Ref.
Various	July 12, 2017 (Note: Release as a promotional single.)	Digital download; streaming	Original	Polydor; Interscope	
United Kingdom	July 28, 2017	Contemporary hit radio	Original	Polydor	
Various	August 25, 2017	Digital download; streaming	Clams Casino remix	Polydor; Interscope	
Various	August 25, 2017	Digital download; streaming	Snakehips remix	Polydor; Interscope	
