= Eric White (artist) =

American artist

Eric White (born June 3, 1968, in Ann Arbor, Michigan) is an American visual artist, based in Los Angeles and New York.

== Early life and education ==
White received his BFA from the Rhode Island School of Design in 1990. He has served as an adjunct professor at The School of Visual Arts in New York City since 2006. In 2010, White received a Painting Fellowship from The New York Foundation for the Arts.

== Work ==
White's paintings are derived from disrupted, cinematic moments where his subjects vacillate between character immersion and audience interaction: the landscape of the film set is just out of reach to the viewer. His work is centered on carefully executed figurative paintings, revealing influences of traditional Surrealism, neo-Realism and Conceptualism. "The paintings and drawings," says Leah Ollman of the Los Angeles Times, "strike a resonant chord -- nostalgic and at the same time also vaguely futuristic, even dystopian. White, based in New York, has a devilish sense of humor."

In a review from LA Weekly, Peter Frank observed that "His dream-state scenes, full of puzzled faces, double-images, anachronisms and attenuated unlikelihoods are painted with a vertiginous exactitude, its wooziness enhanced with bilious colors, weird superimpositions, and a tendency to render everything a little wobbly and elongated—El Greco goes suburban."

Critic Carlo McCormick comments that "For all its passages of radical distortion, poly-perverse morphism, and darkly subversive portraiture, Eric White's art is essentially grounded deeply in the recognizable world. [...] Obsessively crafted in a digital age of endlessly reproductive domains, an unself-conscious idiosyncrasy of our rampant interconnectivity, Eric White paints for the global village idiot that is all of us today."

In 2009, White was chosen to participate in STAGES, a contemporary art exhibition organized by Lance Armstrong and Mark Parker, CEO of Nike, Inc. Its objective was to gather a range of internationally celebrated artists to create unique works benefitting the Lance Armstrong Fund and its LIVESTRONG Global Cancer Campaign. The show debuted at Galerie Emmanuel Perrotin in Paris, appeared at a pop-up space created by Jeffrey Deitch in New York City, and concluded in Miami during Art Basel. Participating artists included Ed Ruscha, Damien Hirst, Takashi Murakami, Richard Prince, Tom Sachs, Raymond Pettibon, Andreas Gursky, and Shepard Fairey.

White's work has been presented at group exhibitions at international nonprofit venues including the Laguna Art Museum, Museo de la Ciudad de México, MACRO (Museo d'arte Contemporanea Roma), The American Visionary Museum in Baltimore and the Long Beach Museum of Art. He has also shown in an array of international private spaces including Gladstone Gallery (New York City), Deitch Projects (New York City), Trampoline House (Brooklyn), and Antonio Columbo (Milan). His work is represented in numerous national and international private collections.

White designed an album cover for Tyler, the Creator's 2017 album, Flower Boy.

== Personal life ==
White was in a relationship with actress Patricia Arquette starting in 2014. In early 2025, Arquette stated she had been single for two years.

== Publications ==
- Eric White (2015, Rizzoli; ISBN 978-0-8478-4620-7)
- Who Are Parents? Eric White. (2005, Perceval Press; ISBN 0-9747078-7-2)
- It Feeds Itself (hardcover). Eric White. (2003, Last Gasp; ISBN 0-86719-547-9)
- Blue Folds Of Skin. Eric White. (1999, Smart Art Press; ASIN: B0006RN7ZC)
