= Boredom (Tyler, the Creator song) =

2017 song by Tyler, the Creator

Single by Tyler, the Creator featuring Rex Orange County and Anna of the North

from the album Flower Boy
- Released: July 11, 2017
- Genre: Alternative R&B; trip hop; neo-soul
- Length: 5:21
- Label: Columbia; Sony Music
- Songwriter: Tyler Okonma
- Producer: Okonma

Tyler, the Creator singles chronology
"911 / Mr. Lonely" (2017)	"Boredom" (2017)	"I Ain't Got Time!" (2017)

Rex Orange County singles chronology
"Never Enough" (2017)	"Boredom" (2017)	"Edition" (2017)

Anna of the North singles chronology
"Someone" (2017)	"Boredom" (2017)	"Money" (2017)

"Boredom" is a song written, produced, and performed by American rapper and producer Tyler, the Creator featuring vocals from English singer Rex Orange County and Norwegian singer Anna of the North, with additional vocals from fellow English singer Corinne Bailey Rae. It was released on July 11, 2017, as the second single from Tyler's fourth studio album Flower Boy.

== Background and composition ==
Produced by Tyler, the Creator, the instrumental of the song opens with a guitar strum, followed by drum rolls and waves of electric organ. A flanging effect can be heard throughout the song. Tyler expresses his boredom, along with feelings of loneliness and isolation in the song. In an interview with comedian Jerrod Carmichael, Tyler spoke about him writing the song:

I wrote that 5pm on a Saturday, laying on my back, looking so bored. It was nothing to do. No one was hitting me back. Jasper was in the other room, bored out of his mind but I didn't see him all day. My room was warm as hell because I like the heater on and it was nothing to eat but dry cereal. And I'm sitting there like what the fuck am I gonna do? I literally wrote that verse in like ten seconds.

== Charts ==
Chart (2017)	Peak position
New Zealand Heatseekers (RMNZ)	10
US Bubbling Under R&B/Hip-Hop Singles (Billboard)	9

== Certifications ==
Region	Certification	Certified units/sales
Canada (Music Canada)	Gold	40,000^{‡}
Norway (IFPI Norway)	Gold	30,000^{‡}
United States (RIAA)	Platinum	1,000,000^{‡}
^{‡} Sales+streaming figures based on certification alone.
