= 911 / Mr. Lonely =

2017 single by Tyler, the Creator

Single by Tyler, the Creator featuring Frank Ocean and Steve Lacy

from the album Flower Boy
- A-side: "Who Dat Boy"
- Released: June 30, 2017
- Recorded: 2016–2017
- Studio: A&M Studios / Henson Recording Studios, Los Angeles
- Genre: Neo soul; hip hop; R&B
- Length: 4:15
- Label: Columbia
- Songwriters: Tyler Okonma; Christopher Breaux; Raymond Calhoun
- Producers: Tyler, the Creator

Tyler, the Creator singles chronology
"Who Dat Boy" (2017)	"911 / Mr. Lonely" (2017)	"Boredom" (2017)

Frank Ocean singles chronology
"Raf" (2017)	"911 / Mr. Lonely" (2017)	"Provider" (2017)

Steve Lacy singles chronology
"Moron" (2017)	"911 / Mr. Lonely" (2017)	"4Real" (2017)

"911 / Mr. Lonely" is a song by American rapper and producer Tyler, the Creator featuring American singers Frank Ocean & Steve Lacy as well as additional uncredited vocals by Norwegian singer Anna of the North. It was released through Columbia Records on June 30, 2017, alongside "Who Dat Boy", as the lead singles from the former's fifth studio album, Flower Boy. Produced by Tyler, he wrote the song alongside Ocean, with Raymond Calhoun receiving writing credits for the interpolation of The Gap Band's song "Outstanding."

== Background and release ==
Following a week of teasing, Tyler, the Creator released a music video for a track titled "Who Dat Boy" on June 30, 2017. At the end of the video, another track was played, which was "911", the first part of the track. Following the release of the video, the songs were officially released together on streaming services the same day, as the lead singles from Flower Boy.

== Composition and lyrics ==
"911 / Mr. Lonely" is a two-part track, with the first part, "911", being described as "sunny and joyful" with synths and a bass described by Pitchfork as "soulful" playing, as the first part of the track contains an interpolation of "Outstanding" by the Gap Band. The lyrics of this part of described as a "heartstick Tyler", as he fails to take pleasure in anything without his lover. Steve Lacy and Anna of the North sing the chorus and the bridge, while Frank Ocean's verse has him singing about remembering a lover that would pick him up from the suburbs.

The track's second part, "Mr. Lonely", contrasts from "911", with a "thunderous" drum pattern and stuttering hi-hats, and involves Tyler rapping about his condition; "I say the loudest in the room/Is prolly the loneliest in the room/It's me".

== Track listing ==
Digital download
No.	Title	Length
1.	"Who Dat Boy" (featuring ASAP Rocky)	3:25
2.	"911 / Mr. Lonely" (featuring Frank Ocean and Steve Lacy)	4:15

== Charts ==
Chart (2017)	Peak position
New Zealand Heatseekers (RMNZ)	3
US Bubbling Under Hot 100 (Billboard)	1
US Hot R&B/Hip-Hop Songs (Billboard)	47

== Certifications ==
Region	Certification	Certified units/sales
Australia (ARIA)	Gold	35,000^{‡}
Canada (Music Canada)	Gold	40,000^{‡}
Norway (IFPI Norway)	Gold	30,000^{‡}
United Kingdom (BPI)	Silver	200,000^{‡}
United States (RIAA)	2× Platinum	2,000,000^{‡}
^{‡} Sales+streaming figures based on certification alone.

== Release history ==
Region	Date	Format	Label	Ref.
United States	June 30, 2017	Digital download	Columbia	
United Kingdom	June 30, 2017	Contemporary hit radio	Columbia	
