= The In Crowd (Jamaican band) =

Jamaican reggae band

- Origin: Kingston, Jamaica
- Genres: Reggae
- Years active: Early 1970s–1980s, 2014–present
- Labels: Cactus/Creole, Island
- Members: Fil Callender; Errol Walker; Clevie Browne; Richard Anthony Johnson; Barry Bailey; Patrick Fabregas
- Past members: Tony Lewis; Freddie Butler; Wigmore Francis; Robbie Lyn; Mikey 'Boo' Richards

The In Crowd are a popular Jamaican reggae showband who had their commercial peak in the late 1970s, best known for the singles "We Play Reggae" and "Back a Yard". They split up in the 1980s but reformed in 2014 to record a new album.

== History ==
Led by Filberto "Fil" Callender (vocals and lead guitar), the band also included Errol Walker (lead vocals), Clevie Browne (drums, vocals), Tony Lewis (bass guitar, vocals), Freddie Butler (keyboards), and Wigmore Francis (guitar). The band also featured a horn section of Egbert Evans and Barry Bailey. Browne had previously been a member of The Browne Bunch.

The band were best known for two hit records, "We Play Reggae" and "Back a Yard", but also had reggae hits with "His Majesty Is Coming" and "Born In Ethiopia". They recorded two albums during their lifetime, His Majesty Is Coming and Man From New Guinea, the latter released on Island Records.

After The In Crowd, Browne became half of one of Jamaica's pre-eminent rhythm sections and production teams, Steely & Clevie. Errol Walker now works on the 7th floor of the Financial Services Authority as an events planner and social coordinator in the Diversity team.

The group reformed in 2014 to record a new album.

== Fil Callender ==
Callender was born in Panama and moved with his family to Jamaica in the 1950s. He grew up in the Molynes Road area of Kingston.

After attending rehearsals at the home of pianist Aubrey Adams he met Eric Frater who recruited him as drummer to his band The Virtues. Through Frater he got the job of drummer in the Studio One house band, of which he was a member for three years. While at Studio One he played drums on The Abyssinians' "Satta Massagana", and on hit singles by The Heptones among others, and guitar on The Slickers' "Johnny Too Bad".

After The In Crowd he went on to a solo career. In 1980 he became a committed Christian and since then has played mainly in church bands.

In 2013, Callender was awarded the Order of Distinction by the Jamaican government in recognition of his contribution to Jamaican music.

== Albums ==
- His Majesty Is Coming (1978) Cactus/Creole (reissued (2005) Trojan)
- Man from New Guinea (1979) Island
- Natural Rock 'n' Reggae (198?) Revue (compilation)
- We Play Reggae: A Tribute (1997) Rhino (compilation)
