= Flower Boy =

- Cover artwork by Eric White

Studio album by Tyler, the Creator
- Released: July 21, 2017
- Recorded: 2015–2017
- Studios: Chalice (Los Angeles); Coldwater (Los Angeles); Paramount (Los Angeles)
- Genres: Hip-hop; jazz rap; neo soul
- Length: 46:33
- Label: Columbia
- Producers: Tyler, the Creator

Tyler, the Creator chronology
Cherry Bomb (2015)	Flower Boy (2017)	Music Inspired by Illumination & Dr. Seuss' The Grinch (2018)

Alternative cover
- Physical cover

Singles from Flower Boy
- 1. "Who Dat Boy" / "911" Released: June 30, 2017; 2. "Boredom" Released: July 11, 2017; 3. "I Ain't Got Time!" Released: July 19, 2017; 4. "See You Again" Released: August 29, 2017

Flower Boy (alternatively titled Scum Fuck Flower Boy) is the fifth studio album by the American rapper and producer Tyler, the Creator, released on July 21, 2017, by Columbia Records. Produced entirely by Tyler, the album features guest vocals from a range of artists, including Frank Ocean, ASAP Rocky, Anna of the North, Lil Wayne, Kali Uchis, Steve Lacy, Estelle, Jaden Smith and Rex Orange County.

Flower Boy was supported by four singles: "Who Dat Boy" / "911", "Boredom", "I Ain't Got Time!" and "See You Again". The album received widespread acclaim from critics for its smoothness, unique blend of genres, collaborations and its production. It debuted at number two on the US Billboard 200 chart. The album was named among the best albums of 2017 and the decade by multiple publications and was nominated for Best Rap Album at the 2018 Grammy Awards.

== Background and recording ==
With Flower Boy, Tyler decided to take a more personal approach compared to his previous album, Cherry Bomb, stating "For Cherry Bomb I purposely was like, I don't want to get personal at all. Like, I'm just going to make songs. And in this one I was like alright, let me write down every feeling". Tyler felt that the general response to Cherry Bomb was poor and he wanted to deliver an album that succeeded it well. The official title was originally thought to be Scum Fuck Flower Boy but was later confirmed simply as Flower Boy shortly prior to release. Tyler noted the works of Max Martin, Pharrell Williams and Justin Timberlake as musical inspirations for the album.

Recording began in late 2015. Like previous releases, the album was produced by Tyler himself. He decided to keep his rap verses short and to-the-point to give guest artists and instrumentation more of a focal point. Many songs on the album featured guitar playing by Austin Feinstein. The beat used on the song "I Ain't Got Time!" was initially made for Kanye West during recording sessions for West's seventh studio album The Life of Pablo. After West declined it, the beat was sent to rapper Nicki Minaj, who reportedly turned it down, according to her then-team's message to Tyler. In a 2023 episode of her radio show Queen Radio, Minaj was asked by a fan about the song and she said that she liked Tyler's music and she does not remember receiving the song or declining it. "Glitter" was written for Justin Bieber; Tyler kept it after Bieber did not return any of his calls. "See You Again" was written for former One Direction member Zayn Malik but was later kept after Malik rejected the song twice. "Who Dat Boy" was rejected by rapper Schoolboy Q.

== Music and lyrics ==
Flower Boy is a hip-hop, jazz rap, and neo soul album; correlating with its title, Tyler has noted flowers as a recurring theme. Andy Kellman of AllMusic describes the overall lyrical content of the album as Tyler's "least vulgar release" compared to the shock value lyrics in his previous projects. The album's opening track, "Foreword", is described by Scott Glaysher of XXL as an open letter to the fans and the nation, citing the lines "How many raps can I write 'til I get me a chain? / How many chains can I wear 'til I'm considered a slave? / How many slaves can it be until Nat Turner arise? / How many riots can it be 'til them Black lives matter?" "Where This Flower Blooms" refers back to his times before fame and money in the first line. Tyler says "Let's take it back to them days / Counting sheep on Sadie Hannah's floor" which refers to the time before and during the release of his debut mixtape Bastard (2009) when he lived in his grandmother's house. "Sometimes..." is a short track which includes an unidentified male stating that he wants to hear the song about him, hinting that the following song, "See You Again", is about Tyler's male lover. "See You Again" is described as a "positively kaleidoscopic love song" about an unidentified person.

Jesse Fairfax of HipHopDX describes "Who Dat Boy" as a "raucous jam that sounds like a score to a horror film", while Zachary Hoskins of Slant Magazine compared the song to Kanye West's song "Freestyle 4". "Pothole" is described as a "low-profile standout" that features vehicular metaphors; potholes are used as a metaphor for being stuck in life. Calum Slingerland of Exclaim! describes "Garden Shed" featuring "psychedelic guitar licks and synths [that] build up a ballad featuring Estelle vocals, as liberation is encouraged before noisy feedback makes way for a confessional verse". Slingerland proclaimed the song is "one of [Tyler's] most powerful recorded moments to date", and also picked out the references to sexuality. Zachary Hoskins of Slant Magazine describes "Garden Shed" as a "woozy trapped-in-the-closet metaphor". Kevin Lozano of Pitchfork spoke on the song "Boredom", stating "[Tyler's] range is kaleidoscopic, and the neo-soul sound he started to shape on Wolf is in full flower" and "large parts of the song is an exercise for him to flex his production skills".

Calum Slingerland of Exclaim! identifies the reference to River Phoenix on "I Ain't Got Time!". Tyler raps "Passenger a white boy, look like River Phoenix". This may also be a reference to the music video of "Who Dat Boy" in which Tyler is in a car with a River Phoenix lookalike sitting in the passenger seat. "I Ain't Got Time!" contains lines that were considered comparable to Eminem's "outlandish statements" throughout his career. The A.V. Club comments on the sampling on "I Ain't Got Time!", saying that it turns an "accordion into a fun-house mirror, warped and disorienting". The song "I Ain't Got Time!" contains the lyrics "I've been kissing white boys since 2004". The song "Garden Shed" also contains subtle references to sexuality with the lyrics "That was real love I was in / Ain't no reason to pretend" and "All my friends was lost / They couldn't read the signs/I didn't want to talk / I tell 'em my location and they ain't want to walk". This led many to speculate that Tyler was "coming out of the closet" as either bisexual or homosexual. This was especially interesting because his lyrics in previous albums were considered homophobic and led to him being banned from entering the United Kingdom for three to five years in 2015. Tyler had previously hinted towards his sexuality status a few years prior.

Vanessa Okoth-Obbo of Pitchfork described "911 / Mr. Lonely" as "look[ing] at the overarching theme of loneliness, on two contrasting, but equally intriguing beats" and stated that the song "represents a further maturation in sound, and apparently his problems too". Hiba Argane of Affinity Magazine analyzed the song "Glitter", stating that it "possesses a repetitive quality, but you can almost feel a crescendo in the content". The final track, "Enjoy Right Now, Today", is an instrumental that features backing vocals from Pharrell Williams.

== Promotion ==
The album title, tracklist and release date was announced by Tyler, the Creator on July 6, 2017, via social media. Two covers were unveiled upon announcement, the main cover designed by Michigan-born artist Eric White and the alternative cover designed by Tyler himself. Billboard's Tatiana Cirisano listed White's cover as one of the best of 2017, dubbing it "surreal". The album leaked 11 days before the announced release date of July 21.

After a one-week countdown on Twitter and Instagram, Tyler, the Creator released a music video, titled "Who Dat Boy", to his official YouTube channel on June 29, 2017. The album's lead single, "Who Dat Boy" / "911", containing two songs: "Who Dat Boy" and "911 / Mr. Lonely" was released as a dual single on June 30, 2017. The single peaked at number 87 on the US Billboard Hot 100. The album's second single, "Boredom", was released on July 11, 2017. The album's third single, "I Ain't Got Time!", was released on July 19, 2017. The album's fourth single, "See You Again", was released on August 29, 2017, to rhythmic and urban contemporary radio.

== Critical reception ==
Flower Boy ratings
Aggregate scores
Source	Rating
AnyDecentMusic?	7.9/10
Metacritic	84/100
Review scores
Source	Rating
AllMusic	5/5 stars
The A.V. Club	A−
Exclaim!	7/10
The Guardian	4/5 stars
HipHopDX	4.5/5
The Independent	4/5 stars
NME	4/5 stars
Pitchfork	8.5/10
Slant Magazine	4/5 stars
XXL	4/5

Flower Boy was met with widespread critical acclaim. At Metacritic, which assigns a normalized rating out of 100 to reviews from professional publications, the album received an average score of 84, based on 18 reviews. Aggregator AnyDecentMusic? gave it 7.9 out of 10, based on their assessment of the critical consensus.

Andy Kellman of AllMusic gave a positive review, stating "While most of these songs are rife with anxiety and isolation, the open-hearted lyricism and wide-scoped productions, put together by an artist in peak form, make them immensely engrossing. Frank Ocean, Pharrell Williams, Kali Uchis, Syd, and Estelle are among 11 supporting cast members, not one of whom is inessential to the whole". Flower Boy was named "Best New Music" by Pitchfork, with reviewer Sheldon Pearce writing, "Tyler's most sincere and most accomplished album, he gets to the essence of what he's been chiseling at: the angst of a missed connection, the pain of unrequited love, and navigating youthful ennui". In his review, Andy Gill of The Independent states, "Flower Boy presents a surprisingly sensitive, thoughtful, even pleasant personality". Jesse Fairfax of HipHopDX stated, "Clocking in at 47 minutes, the album is both Tyler, the Creator's shortest and most cohesive album to date and is full of introspective admissions that logically line up with his public character". Renato Pagnani of The A.V. Club said, "Flower Boy is the first time he's been equally as forthcoming in his actual music. His flow has tightened up, and for a man whose voice basically destined him for rap stardom, he's become even better at stretching his booming baritone into novel shapes, employing a plethora of flows". Scott Glaysher of XXL praised the album saying, "These days, there aren't many rap albums that can service as a deeply digested work of art as well as music for easy listening, yet Tyler, The Creator fills both lanes well. He manages to find the happy medium on Flower Boy and translates it to his best album yet".

Jamie Milton of NME wrote that the album is "Backed by a supporting cast of R&B superstars and bright newcomers, it's a record of long, lazy summers; sitting back and staring at the clouds". Lewis Lister of Clash said, "Previously it felt like as though these two sides have been difficult to reconcile on record; the abrasive would often be at odds with the tranquil, particularly on last studio album Cherry Bomb. On Flower Boy, though, Tyler has perfected his marriage of the two". Paul Lester of The Guardian wrote: "If anything, Flower Boy captures Tyler at his least tormented and twisted; it is an album of exquisitely arranged, melodious synth-rap, wistful and reflective, heavy on the heavenly. It's not all dreamy—watch out for the occasional profane pothole—but largely this is the work of an evolved artist and mature person." Austin Reed of Pretty Much Amazing said, "Flower Boy has elevated Tyler closer to the line. An unexpected move to be sure, but no less impressive whatsoever". In a mixed review, Consequence's Kelly McClure stated: "It's more of the same. It seems to be needing something more. An extra spark of interest." In September 2022, Consequence regretted the review, with Eddie Fu stating: "Flower Boy represented musical growth characterized by its embrace of neo soul and jazz. Even then, it was apparent that the LP was a major leap in Tyler's career."

=== Rankings ===
Select rankings of Flower Boy
Publication	List	Rank	Ref.
Billboard	Billboard's 50 Best Albums of 2017	29	
Complex	The Best Albums of 2017	6	
Exclaim!	Exclaim!'s Top 10 Hip-Hop Albums of 2017	6	
NME	NME's Albums of the Year 2017	19	
Now	The 10 best albums of 2017	7	
Noisey	The 100 Best Albums of 2017	5	
Noisey	The 100 Best Albums of the 2010s	53	
Paste	The 100 Best Albums of the 2010s	96	
Pitchfork	The 50 Best Albums of 2017	8	
Pitchfork	The 200 Best Albums of the 2010s	120	
Slant Magazine	The 25 Best Albums of 2017	14	
The Wire	Top 50 Releases of 2017	18	

=== Industry awards ===
Awards and nominations for Flower Boy
Ceremony	Year	Category	Result	Ref.
Grammy Awards	2018	Best Rap Album	Nominated	

== Commercial performance ==
Flower Boy debuted at number two on the US Billboard 200 with 106,000 album-equivalent units of which 70,000 were pure album sales.

== Track listing ==
All tracks are written and produced by Tyler, the Creator (Tyler Okonma), with additional writers noted.

Flower Boy track listing
No.	Title	Writer(s)	Length
1.	"Foreword" (featuring Rex Orange County)	Tyler Okonma; Alex O'Connor; Michael Karoli^{[a]}; Jaki Liebezeit^{[a]}; Irmin Schmidt^{[a]}; Holger Schuering^{[a]}; Damo Suzuki^{[a]}	3:14
2.	"Where This Flower Blooms" (featuring Frank Ocean)	Okonma; Frank Ocean	3:14
3.	"Sometimes..."		0:36
4.	"See You Again" (featuring Kali Uchis)		3:00
5.	"Who Dat Boy" (featuring ASAP Rocky)	Okonma; Rakim Mayers	3:25
6.	"Pothole" (featuring Jaden Smith)	Okonma; Roy Ayers^{[b]}	3:57
7.	"Garden Shed" (featuring Estelle)	Okonma; Estelle Swaray	3:43
8.	"Boredom" (featuring Rex Orange County and Anna of the North)		5:20
9.	"I Ain't Got Time!"		3:26
10.	"911 / Mr. Lonely" (featuring Frank Ocean and Steve Lacy)	Okonma; Ocean; Raymond Calhoun^{[c]}	4:15
11.	"Droppin' Seeds" (featuring Lil Wayne)	Okonma; Dwayne Carter, Jr.	1:00
12.	"November"		3:45
13.	"Glitter"		3:44
14.	"Enjoy Right Now, Today"		3:55
Total length:			46:34

Samples

- ^{^[a]} "Foreword" incorporates elements of "Spoon (Sonic Youth Remix)", written by Michael Karoli, Jaki Liebezeit, Irmin Schmidt, Holger Schuering, and Damo Suzuki, as performed by Can.
- ^{^[b]} "Pothole" contains elements of "Ooh", written and performed by Roy Ayers.
- "I Ain't Got Time!" incorporates elements of "Introduction", as performed by Bel-Sha-Zaar with Tommy Genapopoluis and the Grecian Knights.
- ^{^[c]} "911 / Mr. Lonely" contains a rendition of "Outstanding", written by Raymond Calhoun and performed by the Gap Band.

== Personnel ==
Credits adapted from the album's liner notes.

- Tyler, the Creator – lead vocals, production, recording, art, packaging design
- Rex Orange County – featured vocals (tracks 1, 8), background vocals (track 7)
- Frank Ocean – featured vocals (tracks 2, 10)
- Kali Uchis – featured vocals (track 4)
- ASAP Rocky – featured vocals (track 5), additional vocals (track 10)
- Jaden Smith – featured vocals (track 6)
- Estelle – featured vocals (track 7)
- Anna of the North – featured vocals (track 8), additional vocals (track 10)
- Steve Lacy – featured vocals (track 10), guitar (track 13)
- Lil Wayne – featured vocals (track 11)
- Pharrell Williams – vocals (track 14)
- Shane Powers – additional vocals (track 3)
- Corinne Bailey Rae – additional vocals (track 8)
- Davon "Jasper" Wilson – additional vocals (track 10)
- Schoolboy Q – additional vocals (track 10)
- Lionel Boyce – additional vocals (track 10)
- Alexander Brettin – background vocals (track 6)
- Austin Feinstein – guitar (tracks 1, 7, 8)
- Vic Wainstein – recording
- Derek Jenner – assistant engineering
- Josh Sellers – assistant engineering
- Neal H Pogue – mixing
- Zachary Acosta – mixing assistance
- Mike Bozzi – mastering
- Sofia Okkonen – photography
- Wyatt – photography
- Eric White – art
- Koopz – packaging design

== Charts ==
=== Weekly charts ===
Chart performance for Flower Boy
Chart (2017–2025)	Peak position
Australian Albums (ARIA)	8
Austrian Albums (Ö3 Austria)	57
Belgian Albums (Ultratop Flanders)	29
Belgian Albums (Ultratop Wallonia)	60
Canadian Albums (Billboard)	2
Danish Albums (Hitlisten)	11
Dutch Albums (Album Top 100)	14
Finnish Albums (Suomen virallinen lista)	37
French Albums (SNEP)	65
German Albums (Offizielle Top 100)	66
Hungarian Physical Albums (MAHASZ)	28
Irish Albums (IRMA)	7
Latvian Albums (LaIPA)	91
New Zealand Albums (RMNZ)	6
Norwegian Albums (VG-lista)	12
Scottish Albums (Official Charts)	26
Swedish Albums (Sverigetopplistan)	20
Swiss Albums (Schweizer Hitparade)	40
UK Albums (Official Charts)	9
UK R&B Albums (Official Charts)	3
US Billboard 200	2
US Top R&B/Hip-Hop Albums (Billboard)	1

=== Year-end charts ===
2017 year-end chart performance for Flower Boy
Chart (2017)	Position
Australian Urban Albums (ARIA)	31
US Billboard 200	136
US Top R&B/Hip-Hop Albums (Billboard)	51

2018 year-end chart performance for Flower Boy
Chart (2018)	Position
US Billboard 200	155

2022 year-end chart performance for Flower Boy
Chart (2022)	Position
US Billboard 200	183

2023 year-end chart performance for Flower Boy
Chart (2023)	Position
US Billboard 200	105
US Top R&B/Hip-Hop Albums (Billboard)	61

2024 year-end chart performance for Flower Boy
Chart (2024)	Position
US Billboard 200	153

2025 year-end chart performance for Flower Boy
Chart (2025)	Position
US Billboard 200	146
US Top R&B/Hip-Hop Albums (Billboard)	46

== Certifications ==
Certifications for Flower Boy
Region	Certification	Certified units/sales
Australia (ARIA)	Gold	35,000^{‡}
Canada (Music Canada)	Platinum	80,000^{‡}
Denmark (IFPI Danmark)	Platinum	20,000^{‡}
France (SNEP)	Gold	50,000^{‡}
Mexico (AMPROFON)	Platinum+Gold	90,000^{‡}
Norway (IFPI Norway)	Platinum	20,000^{‡}
Poland (ZPAV)	Platinum	20,000^{‡}
Sweden (GLF)	Gold	15,000^{‡}
United Kingdom (BPI)	Gold	100,000^{‡}
United States (RIAA)	2× Platinum	2,000,000^{‡}
^{‡} Sales+streaming figures based on certification alone.
