= Casey Veggies discography =

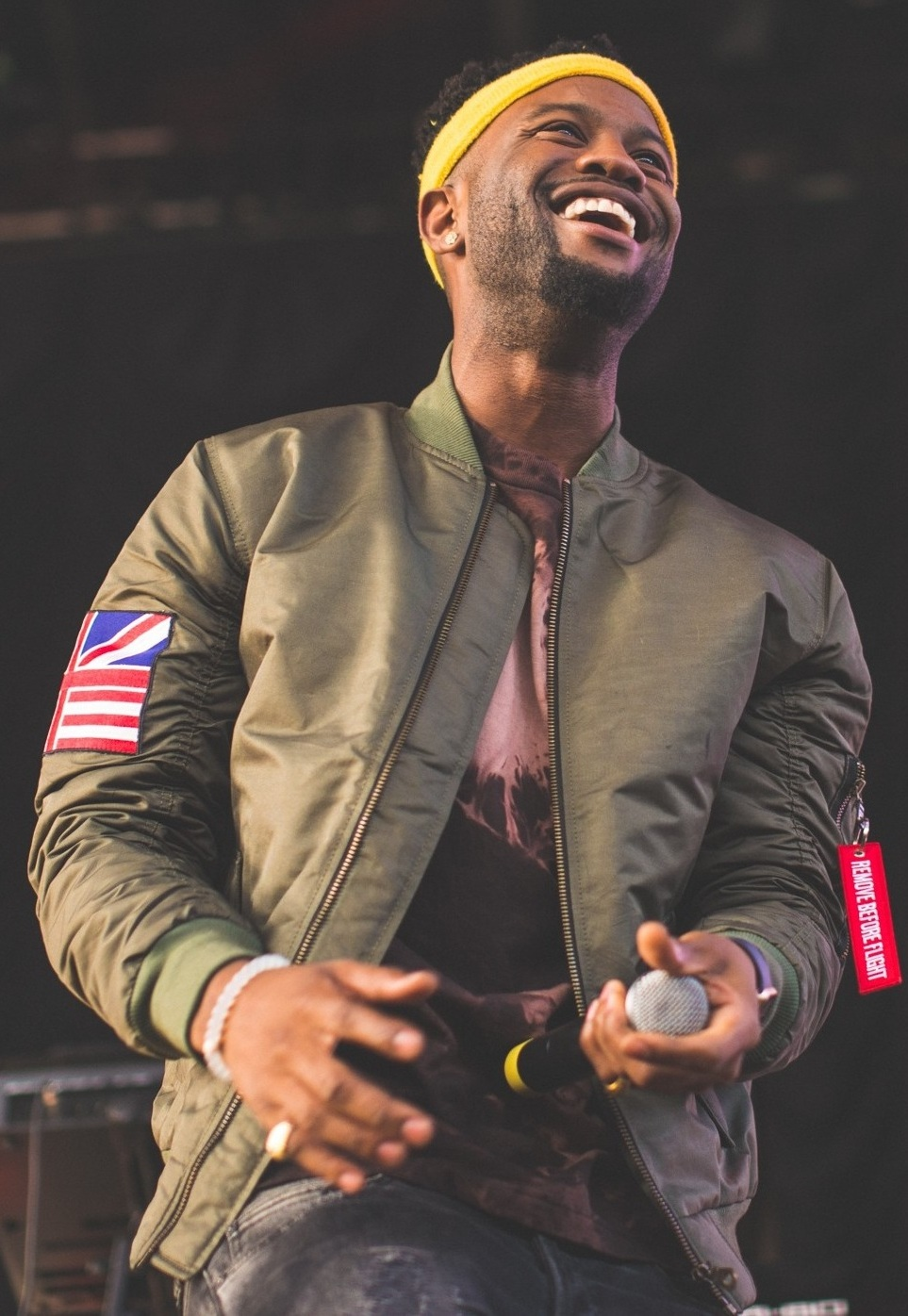
- Veggies performing in July 2016
- Studio albums: 2
- EPs: 2
- Singles: 8
- Mixtapes: 8
- Independent albums: 1
- Collaborative albums: 4
- Guest appearances: 98

The discography of Casey Veggies, an American rapper and songwriter, consists of two studio albums, one independent album, eight mixtapes, four collaborative mixtapes, and 8 singles (including 2 as a featured artist).

== Albums ==
=== Studio albums ===
List of studio albums, with selected information, and selected peak chart positions
Title	Album details	Peak chart positions		
Title	Album details	US	US R&B	US Rap
Live & Grow	Released: September 25, 2015; Label: Vested in Culture, Epic; Format: CD, Digital download	93	15	13
Organic	Released: June 7, 2019; Label: PNCINTL; Format: CD, Digital download	—	—	—
"—" denotes a recording that did not chart or was not released in that territory.

=== Independent Albums ===
List of studio albums, with selected information, and selected peak chart positions
Title	Album details	Peak chart positions		
Title	Album details	US	US R&B	US Rap
Sleeping in Class: Deluxe Edition	Released: September 20, 2011; Label: Peas & Carrots Intl.; Format: CD, Digital download	—	33	22
"—" denotes a recording that did not chart or was not released in that territory.

=== Mixtapes ===
List of mixtapes and selected details
Title	Album details
Customized Greatly Vol. 1	Released: March 29, 2008; Format: Digital download
Customized Greatly Vol. 2	Released: August 22, 2009; Format: Digital download
Sleeping in Class	Released: December 13, 2010; Label: Peas & Carrots; Format: Digital download
Customized Greatly Vol. 3	Released: April 9, 2012; Format: Digital download
Life Changes	Released: January 22, 2013; Format: Digital download
Customized Greatly Vol. 4: The Return of The Boy	Released: May 20, 2016; Format: Digital download
Cg5	Released: February 26, 2021; Format: Digital download
Crypto Veggies	Released: July 22, 2022; Format: Digital download

=== Collaborative mixtapes ===
List of collaborations and selected details
Title	Album details
The Odd Future Tape (with Odd Future)	Released: November 15, 2008; Format: Digital download
Bum Ass Shit (with Rich Hil)	Released: April 12, 2010; Label: Peas & Carrots, No Limos; Format: Digital download
Fresh Veggies (with Rockie Fresh)	Released: December 16, 2013; Format: Digital download
Fresh Veggies 2 (with Rockie Fresh)	Released: July 10, 2020; Format: Digital download, streaming

=== EPs ===
List of EPs and selected details
Title	Album details
Since Y'all Forgot	Released: April 29, 2022; Format: Digital download, streaming
Ten Toes Down	Released: May 12, 2023; Format: Digital download, streaming

== Singles ==
=== As lead artist ===
List of singles as lead artist, with selected chart positions, showing year released and album name
Title	Year	Peak chart positions			Certifications	Album
Title	Year	US	US R&B/ HH	US Rap	Certifications	Album
"The Boy"	2014	—	—	—		non-album single
"Backflip" (featuring YG and Iamsu!)	2014	—	—	—		Live & Grow
"Tied Up" (featuring Dej Loaf)	2015	—	— (Note: "Tied Up" did not enter the Hot R&B/Hip-Hop Songs chart, but peaked at number one on the Bubbling Under R&B/Hip-Hop Singles chart.)	—	RIAA: Gold	Live & Grow
"Awarded"	2019	—	—	—		Organic
"Stop Playin" (featuring Dom Kennedy)	2019	—	—	—		Organic
"Candy"	2019	—	—	—		Organic
"—" denotes a recording that did not chart or was not released in that territory.

=== As featured artist ===
List of singles as featured artist, with selected chart positions, showing year released and album name
Title	Year	Peak chart positions	Certifications	Album
Title	Year	US R&B/ HH	Certifications	Album
"Hive" (Earl Sweatshirt featuring Casey Veggies and Vince Staples)	2013	— (Note: "Hive" did not enter the Hot R&B/Hip-Hop Songs chart, but peaked at number seven on the Bubbling Under R&B/Hip-Hop Singles chart.)	RIAA: Gold	Doris
"Naturally" (DJ Carisma featuring BJ the Chicago Kid and Casey Veggies)	2016	—		non-album single
"—" denotes a recording that did not chart or was not released in that territory.

== Guest appearances ==
List of non-single guest appearances, with other performing artists, showing year released and album name
Title	Year	Artist(s)	Album
"Go Fly a Kite"	2008	Brandun DeShay	Volume: One! For the Money
"Odd Toddlers"	2008	Tyler, The Creator	The Odd Future Tape
"Back for Another One"	2008	Tyler, The Creator	The Odd Future Tape
"Bubble Gum"	2008	Tyler, The Creator, Hodgy Beats	The Odd Future Tape
"Money Talk"	2008	Hodgy Beats	The Odd Future Tape
"What Ya Life Like"	2008	—	The Odd Future Tape
"Remember Me"	2008	Tyler, The Creator	The Odd Future Tape
"Lisa"	2008	Tyler, The Creator, Jasper Dolphin, Left Brain, Hodgy Beats	The Odd Future Tape
"Commercial"	2008	Tyler, The Creator	The Odd Future Tape
"Run Son"	2009	U-N-I, 310, C-San, El Prez	Before There Was Love
"Pink Magic"	2009	Hodgy Beats	The Dena Tape
"Cocaine Keys"	2009	Mike G	Mike Check
"Run Son"	2009	El Prez, U-N-I, 310, C-San	Feature PREZentation
"Odd Toddlers"	2009	Tyler, The Creator	Bastard
"LikethatBronBron"	2010	TreeHouseClub, Gripplyaz	Red-Eye Flights
"Rest Stop Flow"	2010	Brandun DeShay, Tyler, The Creator	—
"Welcome Home Son"	2010	The Jet Age of Tomorrow, Tyler, The Creator	Journey to the 5th Echelon
"In Love We Trust"	2011	Jhené Aiko	—
"Wanna Know Your Name"	2011	Overdoz	Live For, Die For
"Chief Rocka Freestyle"	2011	Pac Div	Mania!
"CDC"	2011	Dom Kennedy, Carter	The Original Dom Kennedy
"On Everything"	2011	SMKA, Skewby, Young Scolla	The 808 Experiment: Vol. 3
"Make It Happen"	2011	Juicy J, Lex Luger	Rubba Band Business 2
"H.T.F.T."	2011	Skeme	The Statement
"Heatwave"	2011	Chiddy Bang, Mac Miller, Trae tha Truth	Peanut Butter and Swelly
"Beats, Hoes and Rhymes"	2011	Dom Kennedy, Schoolboy Q	From the Westside with Love, II
"Living" (Remix)	2011	Rockie Fresh, Tayyib Ali	The Otherside: Redux
"Living" (Super Remix)	2011	Rockie Fresh, Tayyib Ali, Naledge, Phil Adé	The Otherside: Redux
"Duck n Dodgin"	2011	Rockie Fresh	The Otherside: Redux
"Guess Who's Back"	2011	Domo Genesis	Under the Influence
"Get It Together"	2011	Sir Michael Rocks	Premier Politics
"Less"	2011	MellowHype	—
"Top Down"	2011	Pac Div, Skeme	The DiV
"Goin' Up" (Remix)	2011	Young Lace, K. Smith	Cruise Control
"Flood Out the Club"	2011	Juicy J	Blue Dream & Lean
"P.O.P. Music"	2011	Phil Adé	#PhilAdéFriday2
"Hard Times"	2011	Asher Roth, Kids These Days	Pabst & Jazz
"Driving 88"	2012	Rockie Fresh	Driving 88
"Rap Shit"	2012	Problem, Skeme, Terrace Martin, Ab-Soul, Schoolboy Q, Murs	Swig Tape: Volume 1
"Politics"	2012	Ta'East, Stevie Crooks	The Popular Stranger
"All the Way Gone"	2012	Polyester the Saint, Joyce Wrice	Real Deal P
"America"	2012	Mac Miller, Joey Badass	Macadelic
"Blunted"	2012	YG, DJ Mustard, Shitty	4 Hunnid Degreez
"On My Job"	2012	Chip Gnarly, Riko	Guilty of Dedication
"Y.N.M."	2012	DJ Muggs	Rock the Bells
"The Wave"	2012	Raven Sorvino, Ina	Playa del Rey
"Great"	2012	Sir Michael Rocks, Mac Miller	Lap of Lux
"The Clique"	2012	Sir Michael Rocks, Tris J	Lap of Lux
"About Me"	2012	D'Lorin	Still Life
"Do Ya Thang Girl (Jook)"	2012	Strong Arm Steady, Statik Selektah, Picaso	Stereotyoe
"Kill Me Now"	2012	D-Why	Don't Flatter Yourself
"Trap Shit V15 (Turn Up)"	2013	UZ, Iamsu!	Balltrap Muzic Vol. 1
"Cypher"	2013	HS87, Audio Push, Hit-Boy, Kent Money, B Mac the Queen, Schoolboy Q, Xzibit, Rick Ross, Method Man, Redman, Raekwon	All I've Ever Dreamed Of
"Parking Lot"	2013	Tyler, The Creator, Mike G	Wolf
"Cypher"	2013	Kent Money, HS87, Audio Push, Hit-Boy, B Mac the Queen, Schoolboy Q, Xzibit, Rick Ross, Method Man, Redman, Raekwon	Eyes Wide Shut
"Born to Ball"	2013	Niko-G4	Roll the Dice
"One Take"	2013	The Jet Age of Tomorrow, Earl Sweatshirt	JellyFish Mentality
"Bounce That"	2013	DJ Mustard, TeeCee4800, RJ, Royce the Choice, Skeme	Ketchup
"Midnight Run"	2013	DJ Mustard, Royce the Choice, Skeme	Ketchup
"So Good"	2013	DJ Mustard, TeeFlii, Pooh Bear	Fireworks
"Up"	2013	Travis Scott	—
"Anything" (Remix)	2013	JoJo, Francesco	—
"Maxx Out"	2013	League of Starz, Problem, Dizzy Wright	LOS.FM
"Young Niggas"	2013	Juicy J	Block Werk
"Disrespectful"	2013	Black Cobain	Perfect Contradiction
"Tomorrow"	2013	Omarion, Czar	Care Package 2
"Like Me"	2013	Logic	—
"Me & Mine"	2013	Chase N. Cashe	Cashe Rules
"Swag Worth a Mill, Pt. 2"	2014	L.A. Leakers	The 2014 Draft Picks
"L.A. Leakers Freestyle"	2014	L.A. Leakers	The 2014 Draft Picks
"Work"	2014	Ty Dolla Sign, Twista, Nate Howard	Beach House
"Next Time I See You"	2014	Buddy	Idle Time
"Piñata"	2014	Freddie Gibbs, Madlib, Domo Genesis, G-Wiz, Sulaiman, Meechy Darko, Mac Miller	Piñata
"Well Fare"	2014	Blu, Thurz	Good to Be Home
"#FSO"	2014	Bricc Baby Shitro	Son of a Bricc Lady
"Telsa (What You Waiting For)"	2014	Fly Union	Small Victories
"Christian Bale"	2014	Yogi, Knytro, Sway, KSI, Raptor	Burial
"428 to LA"	2014	Cassper Nyovest	Tsholofelo
"Bussin'"	2014	Sir Michael Rocks, Iamsu!	Banco
"Drank n Cranberry"	2014	Ty Dolla Sign	Sign Language
"Body on Me"	2014	Dyme-A-Duzin	Hip Hope
"Wish U Better"	2015	RJ, Royce the Choice	Rich Off Mackin
"Mind Trap"	2015	Audio Push, Vince Staples	The Good Vibe Tribe
"Make Yo Money"	2015	TeeFlii, Nipsey Hussle	AnnieRUO'Tay 4
"All About You"	2015	DJ Mustard, Royce the Choice, TeeFlii	10 Summers: The Mixtape, Vol. 1
"428 to LA"	2015	Cassper Nyovest	Refiloe
"From a Young G'z Perspective"	2016	Niko-G4	Worth the Risk
"Your Life" (Remix)	2016	Rockie Fresh, Rick Ross	The Night I Went to Los Angeles
"Faded"	2016	Cierra Ramirez, Honey C	Discreet
"Stupidly Crazy"	2016	DJ Esco, Nef the Pharaoh	Project E.T.
"Different Day"	2016	Demrick	Collect Call
"Cruise Ship"	2016	Zoey Dollaz	Port-Au-Prince
"Before the Checks"	2016	Kid Ink	RSS2
"New Niggas"	2016	Bino Rideaux	Le' Garçon
"Gang Gang"	2016	Taylor Gang, Chevy Woods, Wiz Khalifa	TGOD Volume 1
"All I Know"	2016	E-40, K Camp	The D-Boy Diary: Book 2
"Tabacco Town"	2017	Kur	180
"New Guy"	2019	24hrs, Rossi Rock	Valentino Twenty
