= Brandun DeShay production discography =

The following list is a discography of production by Brandun DeShay, an American rapper and record producer. It includes a list of songs produced and co-produced by year, artist, album and title.

== 2009 ==
=== Dom Kennedy – FutureStreet/DrugSounds ===
- 03. "Where I Belong"

=== The Super D3Shay - The Super D3Shay ===
- 04. "Play It Safe"
- 07. "We Were" (produced with The Super 3)

=== Hodgy Beats – The Dena Tape ===
- 10. "Memorex CDs"
- 15. "Pink Magic" (featuring Casey Veggies)

== 2010 ==
=== Dom Kennedy – From the Westside with Love ===
- 07. "Locals Only"

=== Curren$y – Smokee Robinson ===
- 06. "Racing Stripes" (featuring Dom Kennedy)

=== Von Pea – So Motivational: The Most Skullduggery of Mixtapes ===
- 06. "Something to Do"
- 09. "Fancy Nancy"

=== Casey Veggies – Sleeping in Class ===
- 02. "Ridin' Roun' Town"
- 03. "Hear Me Screamin'"

== 2011 ==
=== Sir Michael Rocks – The Rocks Report ===
- 04. "Exing"
- 13. "Stagelights'"
- 19. "Don't Wanna Brag"
- 23. "Ground Up" (featuring brandUn DeShay)
- 25. "Skinny Nigga" (featuring MiBBs)

=== Danny Brown - XXX ===
- 03. "Pac Blood"
- 04. "Radio Song"
- 15. "Party All the Time"

=== Casey Veggies - Sleeping in Class: Deluxe Edition ===
- 02. "Ridin Roun Town"
- 03. "Hear Me Screamin"
- 13. "Ridin Roun Town Remix" (featuring Dom Kennedy, C-San, and Kendrick Lamar)

=== Hollywood Floss - 1 Fan at a Time ===
- 09. "Stalker"

=== brandUn DeShay - All Day DeShay: AM ===
- 01. "Shay Loves To Ball"
- 02. "World Famous"
- 03. "They Notice" (featuring Rockie Fresh)
- 04. "NOW! *OVA*"
- 05. "Ur Fresh!"
- 07. "Canopy"
- 09. "FTW!" (featuring Vic Mensa)
- 13. "LATER! *OVA*"
- 14. "Canopy Pt. II"

=== Sir Michael Rocks - Premier Politics ===
- 03. "Thank God"

=== Mac Miller - I Love Life, Thank You ===
- 01. "I Love Life, Thank You"

=== Tennille - The Bronx Zoo ===
- 13. "U Broke the Mold" (featuring Nick Bruno)

== 2012 ==
=== Ro Ransom – Ransomnia ===
- 02. "Limousine"

=== Mac Miller – Macadelic ===
- 05. "Aliens Fighting Robots" (featuring Sir Michael Rocks)

=== Sir Michael Rocks – Premier Politics 1.5 ===
- 01. "Antidote"
- 10. "New Dress"

=== SZA - See.SZA.Run ===
- 03. "Advil"
- 05. "Crack Dreams"
- 06. "Country"

=== Pro Era – P.E.E.P: The aPROcalypse ===
- 10. "School High" (performed by Joey Bada$$, Dyemond Lewis, Kirk Knight, and Nyck Caution)
- 15. "Last Cypher" (performed by Pro Era)

== 2013 ==
=== Uno Hype - Be Good ===
- 09. "In the Long Run"

=== Astro - Deadbeats & Lazy Lyrics ===
- 10. "Grind-In"

=== Astro - Starvin' Like Marvin For A Cool J Song ===
- 01. "Intro"
- 03. "Hollywood"
- 06. "Brooklyn"

=== Choo Jackson - "Beer Flavored Pizza ===
Source:"

- 14. "Old Pictures On The Wall ft. Mac Miller"

=== Chance The Rapper - Acid Rap ===
- 09. "NaNa" (featuring Action Bronson)

=== CJ Fly - Thee Way Eye See It ===
- 12. "Sadderdaze" (featuring Ab-Soul)

=== Retrospect – The Breakout: Part 1 ===
- 04. "We Came Last"

=== Primavera Vills - Basic Math ===
- 07. "Life's a Bitch" (produced with Primavera Vills)

=== SZA - S ===
- 04. "The Odyssey"

== 2014 ==
=== Kitty - Impatiens ===
- 02. "Morgan Stop"

=== The Underachievers - Cellar Door: Terminus Ut Exordium ===
- 07. "Metropolis"

=== Astro - Computer Era ===
- 02. "U Know" (featuring Nathaniel)

=== OG Swaggerdick - Game Boy Colored ===
- 09. "Red & Meth" (featuring Cam Meekins)

== 2015 ==
=== Mega Ran and Sammus - Gone ===
- 01. "Gone"

=== Reddy - 취권 (Chi Kwon) ===
- 01. "취권 (Chi Kwon)" (featuring brandUn DeShay)

== 2016 ==
=== Audio Push - Inland City Blues ===
- 01. "Inland City Blues"

=== Dumbfoundead - We Might Die ===
- 04. "We Might Die"

=== Pell - EP ===
- 01. "All In A Day's Work"

== 2017 ==
=== Year of the Ox - YOX EP ===
- 07. "Jetlag"

=== RAU DEF - UNISEX ===
- 02. “現象 “Genshow”

== 2018 ==
=== Dumbfoundead - Rocket Man EP ===
- 03. "Kill Me"

=== INNOSENT in FORMAL - The night late show ===
- 02. "Footloose"

=== kZm - DIMENSION ===
- 05. "WANGAN"

== 2021 ==
=== Ace Hashimoto - VAPORWAVES ===
- "VAPORWAVES" (featuring Thundercat)

=== Ace Hashimoto - PLAY.MAKE.BELIEVE ===
- 04 "2NITE" (featuring Taichi Mukai) [produced with Slom]
- 05 "TRAK STAR (featuring Tkay Maidza)
- 06 "Great Indoors" (featuring Devin Morrison & Sir Michael Rocks)
- 07 "Bad Habits" (featuring Ta-Ra)
- 08 "Affection"
- 09 "4EVERYTHING" (featuring Kero One)
- 10 "Nice To Know You"
- 11 "Etika's Interlude"
- 12 "I Feel Fly" (featuring Mon’ Aerie)
- 13 "Ending Theme"

== 2022 ==
=== brandUn DeShay - We On ===
- 'We On' (featuring Mac Miller & Sir Michael Rocks)

=== Ace Hashimoto ===
- "CALI 2 JPN" (featuring 5LACK)
- "YOU WON'T COME BACK"
