= Organic (Casey Veggies album) =

- Cover art for Organic

Studio album by Casey Veggies
- Released: June 7, 2019
- Genre: Hip hop
- Length: 36:01
- Label: Peas & Carrots
- Producer: Julian Earle; YoungBoyBrown; J.LBS; Mosley; G. Ry; Iamsu!; Mike & Keys; Tre Fresh; 2Fly; Sap; G Koop; Jake One; SS.Kev; T.Reg; KJ Santana; Hit-Boy; K.Fisha

Casey Veggies chronology
Customized Greatly Vol. 4: The Return of the Boy (2016)	Organic (2019)	Fresh Veggies 2 (2020)

Deluxe edition cover
- Cover for the deluxe edition

Singles from Organic
- 1. "Mirage" Released: February 22, 2019; 2. "Awarded" Released: May 25, 2019; 3. "Stop Playin" Released: June 4, 2019

Organic is the second studio album by American hip hop artist Casey Veggies. It was released independently on June 7, 2019 through his own label Peas & Carrots International. It comes after his departure from Epic Records, under which he released his debut studio album Live & Grow. The deluxe edition was released on November 22, 2019.

== Background and singles ==
Veggies had previously been signed to the label Epic Records, but left the record some time after the release of his debut studio album Live & Grow, which was released under Epic Records. On May 30, 2019, Veggies' participated in an interview with MTV. In this interview, Veggies gave an explanation for his split from Epic Records, citing creative differences. He also characterized Organic as "an answer to everyone that doubted me". The album's first single, "Mirage", was released on February 22, 2019, with the music video being released on May 3, 2019. The album's second single, "Awarded", was released on May 25, 2019, alongside a music video on May 27, 2019. The album's third single, "Stop Playin" featuring Dom Kennedy, was released on June 4, 2019.

== Release ==
Organic was released on June 7, 2019, to generally favorable reviews. One month later, the music video for "Stop Playin" was released on July 8, 2019. On November 22, 2019, the deluxe edition of the album was released, adding five new songs to the tracklist.

== Reception ==
Reception of Organic was mostly positive. Spencer Lobdell of StereoVision stated that the album is "focused, entertaining, and delivers a clear message of toughness and independence." Lobdell also highlighted Veggies' "resiliency and independence" on the single "Awarded", as well as praising his "pen game" across the entire project. Writing for HipHopDX, Bernadette Giacomazzo said the album "...showcases an artist that has grown comfortable in his own skin and his own talent." However, Giacomazzo criticized the album's number of features, calling it "overwhelming". She specifically called Dom Kennedy's performance on "Stop Playin", "an albatross hanging over Veggies". Evan Dale of RNGLDR magazine expressed that "Seemingly every track, all for very different reasons, can be pulled from the album, examined, and enjoyed on their own. Every track is a standout for a different reason. Every track is probably someone’s favorite for a different reason." He also characterized the album as "a winner".

== Track listing ==
No.	Title	Producer(s)	Length
1.	"Dream$"	Julian Earle	4:00
2.	"Awarded"	YoungBoyBrown; Mac Henson	3:17
3.	"The Ceiling"	J.LBS	3:18
4.	"Stop Playin" (featuring Dom Kennedy)	Mosley; G. Ry	3:01
5.	"I Came Up" (featuring Bino Rideaux, E-40, and YG)	Iamsu!; Mike & Keys; Tre Fresh	3:55
6.	"Shake Somethin" (featuring Kalan.FrFr)	Mike & Keys	3:21
7.	"Candy" (featuring The Game)	2Fly	3:23
8.	"No Favors"	Sap	4:55
9.	"Mirage"	Mike & Keys	3:41
10.	"Take It Slow" (featuring BJ the Chicago Kid)	G Koop; Jake One; Mike & Keys	3:10
Total length:			36:01

Deluxe edition
No.	Title	Producer(s)	Length
1.	"Big Racks" (featuring Iamsu!)	SS.Kev	3:21
2.	"Foreign Coupes"	T.Reg	2:57
3.	"I Be Over Shit, Pt. 2"	KJ Santana; Hit-Boy	2:44
4.	"Neva Switched" (featuring Larry June)	K.Fisha	3:35
5.	"Banners"	KJ Santana	3:08
Total length:			51:46
