= Cherry Bomb (album) =

2015 studio album by Tyler, the Creator

Studio album by Tyler, the Creator
- Released: April 13, 2015
- Recorded: 2011–2015
- Studios: Conway; Paramount (Hollywood); Herd (Boston); Hit Factory Criteria (Miami); No Name (California); Terminus (New York City); Trap 3.0 (Los Angeles)
- Length: 54:04
- Label: Odd Future
- Producers: Tyler, the Creator

Tyler, the Creator chronology
| Wolf (2013) | Cherry Bomb (2015) | Flower Boy (2017) |

Alternate covers
- Four alternate covers

Singles from Cherry Bomb
- 1. "Deathcamp" Released: April 9, 2015; 2. "Fucking Young / Perfect" Released: April 9, 2015

Cherry Bomb is the fourth studio album by the American rapper Tyler, the Creator. It was released on April 13, 2015, by Odd Future Records. On April 9, 2015, the album was informally announced on iTunes, along with the release of two tracks. Production was handled entirely by Tyler himself, with additional contributions by Incubus guitarist Mike Einziger. The album features guest appearances from Schoolboy Q, Charlie Wilson, Kali Uchis, Kanye West, Lil Wayne, Pharrell Williams and Austin Feinstein, among others. The album was supported by two singles: "Deathcamp" and "Fucking Young / Perfect", accompanied by 2 music videos.

Cherry Bomb received generally positive reviews from critics. It debuted at number four on the US Billboard 200, selling 51,000 copies in its first week.

== Background ==
In November 2014, Larry Fitzmaurice wrote a piece for The Fader, giving details about a follow-up to Tyler, the Creator's third studio album, Wolf (2013). Fitzmaurice wrote the album features a multitude of guests, but likely no features from other Odd Future members, the rap group of which Tyler is the face, stating: "Everyone's on their own island." Tyler cited artist Stevie Wonder as his inspiration for the album. Associate editor of The Fader, Matthew Trammel, reported that the album would feature Tyler lyrically tackling many current social issues. Trammel noted that "[Tyler] offers up heavy-handed indictments of gang culture and rapper consumerism, calling them detrimental not just to the progress of his race, but to humanity as a whole". Guests that were rumored to appear included Jay-Z, Rick Ross, Keyshia Cole, Cherry Glazerr, Willow Smith, Leon Ware, and Kali Uchis.

== Recording and production ==
Cherry Bomb was recorded in Tyler's home studio as well as other studios in California. The sample for "Deathcamp" was rejected shortly before the album was due to be turned in, so some elements of the song were re-recorded. The string section featured in the song "2Seater" was composed by Tyler and recorded at German composer Hans Zimmer's studio; it marked Tyler's first time overseeing a live orchestra. "Run" was recorded in Tyler's living room and features harmonic vocals from Chaz Bundick who also provided guitar chords to the song "Fucking Young". "Find Your Wings" initially featured vocals from singers Samantha Nelson, Onitsha Shaw and Tiffany Palmer. The final version features vocals from Kali Uchis. Kanye West explained that he rewrote his lines for the song "Smuckers" after he heard Tyler's and Lil Wayne's verses to the song. ASAP Rocky was present during some album sessions despite not being featured on the album. The title for the song "The Brown Stains of Darkeese Latifah Part 6-12 (Remix)" was made intentionally long. Its original title was "The Brown Stains of Blackeese Latifah Part 6-12 (The Remix) (Rough Draft) (Club Edit) (Rodney Jerkins Mix)". Tyler explained in a Hot 97 interview in 2015 that, after making the song, he and others felt that they should name the song with "the blackest name that [they] could think of".

== Music and lyrics ==
The album's opening song, "Deathcamp", has been compared to N.E.R.D.'s debut album In Search of... (2001), particularly the song "Lapdance". Tyler specifically mentions the album in the song with the lines "In Search of... did more for me than Illmatic". Andrew Unterberger of Spin also compared "Deathcamp" to In Search of... and also pointed out its four-count intro commonly used in Pharrell-produced songs. Matthew Ramirez of Pitchfork likened "Deathcamp" to the Stooges, Glassjaw, Trash Talk, Lil Wayne's seventh studio album Rebirth as well as N.E.R.D. In response to claims of homophobia, Tyler jokingly replaces the word "faggot" with "book" to refer to critics on the song "Buffalo". David Jeffries of AllMusic described the track "Find Your Wings" as "smooth and jazzy", and the title track "Cherry Bomb" as "drill 'n' bass [...] as muted trumpets, xylophones, crunching guitars, and Atari Teenage Riot-style compression all fly by". The title track has also been compared to the works of experimental hip hop group Death Grips. A portion of the song "The Brown Stains of Darkeese Latifah Part 6-12 (Remix)" has a cadence similar to N.E.R.D member Pharrell Williams. The lyrics of "Fucking Young / Perfect" details Tyler's attraction to a girl six years younger than him. Ramirez described "Fucking Young" as "a warm-sounding piece of pop music". Unterberger compared the hook, sung by Charlie Wilson, to "'60s sleaze-pop".

== Promotion and release ==
On April 9, 2015, Rap-Up reported that Tyler had announced his Cherry Bomb Tour, which will visit various locations around the world, starting with his live debut of songs from the album at Coachella on April 11 to September 13, in Tokyo. On the same day, after announcing his Golf Media app and Golf Magazine, Tyler released a music video for the song "Fucking Young" on the app and on YouTube. Tyler announced on Twitter that Cherry Bomb would receive a physical release two weeks after its digital release, and that it would have five different album covers. On April 12, 2015, the full track list was revealed via Tyler's Instagram.

=== Singles ===
On April 9, 2015, the lead and second single, "Deathcamp" and "Fucking Young / Perfect" were released consecutively on iTunes Store, and was made available for download before the album's release. The music video for "Fucking Young" contains a snippet of an accompanying music video for "Deathcamp". A music video for "Perfect" was released on February 8, 2016.

=== Other songs ===
On October 1, 2015, a dual music video for "Buffalo" and "Find Your Wings" was released to the Odd Future YouTube channel. The video for "Buffalo" features Tyler, with his entire body painted white, escaping a hanging, then being chased by an all black angry mob. The "Find Your Wings" portion of the video features Tyler and other backing members of Odd Future performing the song on a show stylized as a 1970s music show.

=== Instrumentals ===
On October 12, 2018, Tyler, the Creator released the instrumentals of Cherry Bomb on a two-disc expanded edition of the album. Upon its release, Tyler described Cherry Bomb as "the music I've always wanted to make".

== Critical reception ==
Professional ratings
Aggregate scores
| Source | Rating |
|---|---|
| AnyDecentMusic? | 6.0/10 |
| Metacritic | 69/100 |
Review scores
| Source | Rating |
| AllMusic | 3.5/5 stars |
| The A.V. Club | C+ |
| Complex | 3.5/5 stars |
| Exclaim! | 5/10 |
| HipHopDX | 4.0/5 |
| NME | 8/10 |
| Pitchfork | 6.7/10 |
| Rolling Stone | 3.5/5 stars |
| Spin | 6/10 |
| XXL | 4/5 |

Cherry Bomb was met with generally positive reviews. At Metacritic, which assigns a normalized rating out of 100 to reviews from mainstream publications, the album received an average score of 69, based on 23 reviews. Aggregator AnyDecentMusic? gave it 6.0 out of 10, based on their assessment of the critical consensus.

David Jeffries of AllMusic said, "Returning customers who like Tyler the ringleader, or Tyler the producer, will find this to be too much of a good thing, and can embrace the free-form Cherry Bomb as another freaky trip worth taking". Angel Diaz of Complex said, "Cherry Bomb is Tyler's greatest creation to date. However, the album is bit of a mess in the beginning, and while Tyler's grown immensely as a producer, his rapping isn't consistently up to par". The Guardian's Paul Lester described the album's sound as "fizzy sonics and lush eruptions of synths and strings" in his 3/5 star review for the album, whilst also noting the influence of N.E.R.D, comparing the opening song "Deathcamp" to N.E.R.D's 2001 release "Lapdance".

Kellan Miller of HipHopDX said, "Musically, he is maturing before our very eyes". Louis Pattison of NME said, "Cherry Bomb might be the tightest, leanest Tyler album yet". Matthew Ramirez of Pitchfork said, "His greatest strength has always been world-building, using a synth-heavy blitz of candy-colored jazz chords taken straight (sometimes blatantly so) from the Pharrell handbook. Cherry Bomb isn't exactly a hard left turn from this lane, but it is a quick swerve". Jon Dolan of Rolling Stone said, "Tyler's self-produced new one flows from the Neptunes tribute "Deathcamp" to the summery whimsy of "Find Your Wings"". Dean Van Nguyen of Clash said, "If anything, the album is held back by his ambition—imprudent testing falls short of his usual standards. There are lessons to be learned here, and as a document of Tyler's growth, this may well be looked back upon as a watershed moment".

Tom Breihan, writing for Stereogum, felt the album was "cluttered and chaotic" but also believed it to be an improvement on Tyler's previous studio album Wolf (2013). Breihan also praised the album's musical choices for being "brave and commendable" but added that "I'm not sure they add up to a great song". Calum Slingerland of Exclaim! praised Tyler's work with R&B and soul music sounds on "Find Your Wings" and "Fucking Young", though their juxtaposition with moments of poorly-mixed, blown out aggression lessened their effect. Rachel Chesbrough of XXL said, "Cherry Bomb is his greatest achievement thus far, solidifying his place in the game, with or without the conspicuously absent Odd Future crew". Evan Rytlewski of The A.V. Club said, "For all their blown-out abrasion, though, Tyler's harder tracks never dazzle the way West's industrial experiments did. They merely cloy". Andrew Unterberger of Spin said, "Cherry Bomb is both impressive in its ambition and absolutely stunning in its aimlessness, weaving countless genres into multi-part suites but still coming off undercooked in its entirety".

=== Rankings ===
Year-end lists for Cherry Bomb
| Publication | List | Rank | Ref. |
|---|---|---|---|
| Crack Magazine | Albums of the Year 2015 | 83 | |
| Noisey | The 50 Best Albums of 2015 | 43 | |

== Commercial performance ==
Cherry Bomb debuted at number four on the US Billboard 200 with 58,000 album-equivalent units of which 51,000 were pure album sales.

== Track listing ==
All tracks are written and produced by Tyler, the Creator, except where noted.

Cherry Bomb track listing
| No. | Title | Writer(s) | Length |
|---|---|---|---|
| 1. | "Deathcamp" (featuring Cole Alexander; additional production by Mike Einziger) | Tyler Okonma; Hermon Weems^{[a]} | 3:09 |
| 2. | "Buffalo" (featuring Shane Powers) | | 2:39 |
| 3. | "Pilot" (featuring Syd Bennett) | | 3:29 |
| 4. | "Run" (featuring Chaz Bundick and Schoolboy Q) | | 1:09 |
| 5. | "Find Your Wings" (featuring Roy Ayers, Syd Bennett, Jameel Kirk Bruner, and Kali Uchis) | | 2:59 |
| 6. | "Cherry Bomb" | | 4:29 |
| 7. | "Blow My Load" (featuring Wanya Morris and Dâm-Funk) | | 3:10 |
| 8. | "2Seater" (featuring Aaron Shaw and Samantha Nelson; additional production by Mike Einziger) | | 6:49 |
| 9. | "The Brown Stains of Darkeese Latifah Part 6–12 (Remix)" (featuring Schoolboy Q) | Okonma; Quincy Hanley | 3:11 |
| 10. | "Fucking Young / Perfect" (featuring Charlie Wilson, Chaz Bundick, Syd Bennett, and Kali Uchis) | Okonma; Kali Uchis | 6:41 |
| 11. | "Smuckers" (featuring Lil Wayne and Kanye West) | Okonma; Dwayne Carter, Jr.; Kanye West; Gabriele Ducros^{[b]} | 5:34 |
| 12. | "Keep Da O's" (featuring Pharrell Williams and Coco O.) | Okonma; Williams; Al Dubin^{[c]}; Harry Warren^{[c]} | 4:08 |
| 13. | "Okaga, CA" (featuring Alice Smith, Leon Ware, and Clem Creevy) | Okonma; Clementine Creevy | 6:37 |
| Total length: | | | 54:04 |

Physical copy bonus track
| No. | Title | Length |
|---|---|---|
| 14. | "Yellow" (featuring Kali Uchis) | 2:57 |
| Total length: | | 57:01 |

Instrumentals edition
| No. | Title | Length |
|---|---|---|
| 1. | "Deathcamp" (Instrumental) | 3:12 |
| 2. | "Buffalo" (Instrumental) | 2:40 |
| 3. | "Pilot" (Instrumental) | 3:29 |
| 4. | "Run" (Instrumental) | 1:10 |
| 5. | "Find Your Wings" (Instrumental) | 3:00 |
| 6. | "Cherry Bomb" (Instrumental) | 4:29 |
| 7. | "Blow My Load" (Instrumental) | 2:56 |
| 8. | "2Seater" (Instrumental) | 6:50 |
| 9. | "The Brown Stains of Darkeese Latifah Part 6–12 (Remix)" (Instrumental) | 4:38 |
| 10. | "Fucking Young / Perfect" (Instrumental) | 6:41 |
| 11. | "Smuckers" (Instrumental) | 5:38 |
| 12. | "Keep Da O's" (Instrumental) | 4:10 |
| 13. | "Okaga, CA" (Instrumental) | 6:36 |
| Total length: | | 55:39 |

Notes

- All track titles are stylized in all caps.
- "2Seater" contains the hidden track "Hair Blows", featuring Austin Feinstein and Syd Bennett.
- "The Brown Stains of Darkeese Latifah Part 6–12 (Remix)" is followed by the hidden track "Special" on the physical version.

Sample credits

- ^{^[a]} "Deathcamp" contains a portion of "Why Can't There Be Love", written by Herman Weems.
- "Buffalo" contains a sample from "Shake Your Booty", performed by Bunny Sigler.
- ^{^[b]} "Smuckers" contains a sample from "Metropolis Notte", written and performed by Gabriele Ducros.
- ^{^[c]} "Keep Da O's" contains a portion of "I Only Have Eyes for You", written by Al Dubin and Harry Warren.

== Personnel ==
Credits for Cherry Bomb adapted from vinyl liner notes.

=== Musicians ===
- Cole Alexander – additional vocals and guitar (1)
- Colin Boyd – piano (2)
- Chaz Bundick – additional vocals (4), guitar (10)
- Schoolboy Q – additional vocals (4)
- Jameel Kirk Bruner – piano (5)
- Steve Lacy – guitar (5)
- Gaika James – trombone (5)
- Daniel Hardaway – trumpet (5)
- Roy Ayers – vibraphone (5)
- Syd Bennett – additional vocals (5, "Hair Blows"), background vocals (10)
- Kali Uchis – additional vocals (5, 10, "Yellow")
- Samantha Nelson – additional vocals (5, 8, 11)
- Tiffany Palmer – additional vocals (5)
- Onitsha Shaw – additional vocals (5)
- Dâm-Funk – synthesizer (7)
- Shane Powers – additional vocals (7)
- Aaron Shaw – saxophone (8)
- Crystal Anne Tillman – additional vocals (8)
- Austin Feinstein – guitar ("Hair Blows")
- Charlie Wilson – additional vocals (10)
- Coco Owino – additional vocals (12)
- Pharrell Williams – additional vocals (12)
- Clementine Creevy – additional vocals (13)
- Alice Smith – additional vocals (13)
- Leon Ware – additional vocals (13)

=== Technical ===
- Tyler, the Creator – recording (all), Golf Radio jingles (writing), layout
- Vic Wainstein – recording (all)
- Syd Bennett – recording (all)
- Mick Guzauski – mixing
- Tim Davis – Golf Radio jingles (writing, vocal arrangement, performance)
- Brian "Big Bass" Gardner – mastering
- Phil Toselli – layout
- Jack DeBoe – additional engineering (1)
- James Yost – recording (vibraphone; 5)
- Daniel Avila – recording assistance (vibraphone; 5)
- Angel "Ohnel" Oponte – recording (Lil Wayne; 11)
- Noah Goldstein – recording (Kanye West; 11)
- Mike Larsen – recording (Pharrell Williams; 12)
- Raphael Mesquita – recording assistance (Pharrell Williams; 12)

== Charts ==
=== Weekly charts ===
2015 chart performance for Cherry Bomb
| Chart (2015) | Peak position |
|---|---|
| Australian Albums (ARIA) | 13 |
| Belgian Albums (Ultratop Flanders) | 83 |
| Belgian Albums (Ultratop Wallonia) | 187 |
| Canadian Albums (Billboard) | 5 |
| Danish Albums (Hitlisten) | 37 |
| Dutch Albums (Album Top 100) | 95 |
| French Albums (SNEP) | 195 |
| Irish Albums (IRMA) | 38 |
| New Zealand Albums (RMNZ) | 23 |
| Norwegian Albums (VG-lista) | 35 |
| Scottish Albums (Official Charts) | 18 |
| UK Albums (Official Charts) | 16 |
| UK R&B Albums (Official Charts) | 2 |
| US Billboard 200 | 4 |
| US Top R&B/Hip-Hop Albums (Billboard) | 1 |

2020–2025 chart performance for Cherry Bomb
| Chart (2020–2025) | Peak position |
|---|---|
| Australian Albums (ARIA) | 10 |
| Austrian Albums (Ö3 Austria) | 26 |
| Belgian Albums (Ultratop Flanders) | 16 |
| Belgian Albums (Ultratop Wallonia) | 95 |
| Dutch Albums (Album Top 100) | 34 |
| German Albums (Offizielle Top 100) | 22 |
| Greek Albums (IFPI) | 39 |
| Hungarian Physical Albums (MAHASZ) | 21 |
| Irish Albums (Official Charts) | 22 |
| Polish Albums (ZPAV) | 15 |
| Portuguese Albums (AFP) | 4 |
| Scottish Albums (Official Charts) | 6 |
| Swiss Albums (Schweizer Hitparade) | 64 |
| UK Albums (Official Charts) | 32 |
| UK R&B Albums (Official Charts) | 1 |
| US Billboard 200 | 6 |
| US Top R&B/Hip-Hop Albums (Billboard) | 1 |

=== Year-end charts ===
2015 year-end chart performance for Cherry Bomb
| Chart (2015) | Position |
|---|---|
| Australian Urban Albums (ARIA) | 52 |
| US Top R&B/Hip-Hop Albums (Billboard) | 52 |

== Certifications ==
Certifications for Cherry Bomb
| Region | Certification | Certified units/sales |
|---|---|---|
| United States (RIAA) | Gold | 500,000^{‡} |
^{‡} Sales+streaming figures based on certification alone.
