= Sleeping in Class =

Mixtape by Casey Veggies
- Released: December 13, 2010
- Recorded: 2010
- Genre: Hip hop
- Label: Peas & Carrots; Delicious Vinyl
- Producer: Beats4Clothes; Brandun DeShay; Champange Clique; C.P Dubb; Hit-Boy; J.LBS; Lazy Lou; Nick Kage; Outbreak; Polyester; THC; Ty Cody; Tyler, the Creator; Uncle Dave; Woody; Xoolew

Casey Veggies chronology
Customized Greatly Vol. 2 (2009)	Sleeping in Class (2010)	Customized Greatly Vol. 3 (2012)

Singles from Sleeping in Class
- 1. "Ridin' Roun Town" Released: September 2, 2011

Sleeping in Class is the third mixtape by American rapper Casey Veggies. It was released on December 13, 2010, by Peas & Carrots International. A reissued deluxe edition of the mixtape was released on September 20, 2011, by Peas & Carrots International and Delicious Vinyl. The mixtape contains guest appearances from Dom Kennedy, Kendrick Lamar, Tyler, the Creator, Mac Miller, Skye Townsend, and Mann, among others.

== Track listing ==
No.	Title	Writer(s)	Producer(s)	Length
1.	"Forever"	Casey Jones	Beats4Clothes	3:37
2.	"Ridin' Roun Town"	Jones; Brandun DeShay	DeShay	4:57
3.	"Hear Me Screamin'"	Jones; DeShay	DeShay	4:26
4.	"Get Through" (featuring Dom Kennedy)	Jones; Axel Morgan; Ricci Riera; Dominic Hunn	THC	3:21
5.	"30,000" (featuring Nero)	Jones	Woody	4:10
6.	"Loved Then Alone"	Jones	Outbreak	4:04
7.	"Go Ahead" (featuring Mann)	Jones; Dijon Thames	J.LBS	3:45
8.	"Time Flies" (featuring Skye Townsend)	Jones; Christopher Cleveland; Skylar Townsend	Polyester; Lazy Lou	4:15
9.	"Searching"	Jones	Champange Clique	4:22
10.	"DTA" (featuring Tyler, the Creator)	Jones; Tyler Okonma	Tyler, the Creator	4:00
11.	"Euphoria II"	Jones	Uncle Dave	4:39
12.	"And Ever"	Jones	Ty Cody	3:45

Deluxe edition bonus tracks
No.	Title	Writer(s)	Producer(s)	Length
13.	"Ridin' Roun Town" (Remix) (featuring C-San, Dom Kennedy, and Kendrick Lamar)	Jones; DeShay; Hunn; Kendrick Duckworth	DeShay	6:45
14.	"The Weight of the World Theory"	Jones	Nick Kage	1:41
15.	"Can I Live" (featuring Mac Miller)	Jones; Malcolm McCormick	C.P Dubb	3:57
16.	"I Be Over Shxt"	Jones; Chauncey Hollis, Jr.	Hit-Boy	3:21
17.	"Perfect"	Jones	Xoolew	2:58

== Critical reception ==
Professional ratings
Review scores
Source	Rating
BoxCarFlow	4/05 stars
Hiphopspeakeasy	7/10

The album received positive reviews from music critics. His talent was praised for the album. Schmidty of BoxCarFlow said "Sleeping In Class showcases an enormous talent with tremendous promise." While iHipHop wrote "Casey brings a much more conventional flow and attitude to his work." His lyrical delivery was praised as iHiphop wrote "He works clever turns of phrase, setting up decent punch lines and flowing with a decent amount of energy."

In addition he was praised for his maturity. Undergroundhiphop wrote "Casey's ability to rap about the trials and tribulations of a young adult while ...appealing to an older crowd is what makes Casey Veggies one of the most promising freshmen on the west coast." While Schmidty wrote "He delivers thoughts ... about life, school, relationships, his hometown of Inglewood and trying to make a name for himself." The production was fairly praised. While iHipHop wrote "The strong point of the album though has to be the production, with more than a few songs on here that go pretty hard." For one particular song they wrote "30,000” has heavy drums and an alien sounding synth line that sounds like a spaceship's theft deterrence alarm." Schmidty wrote "Production-wise, there are some truly impressive beats from a slew of relatively unknown producers, with exception of a few names."

The guest appearances were also acclaimed. Stone of hiphopspeakeasy said "He also got some interesting features on this album." He was praised for straying away from typical rap themes: Grounded in a reality that some of his peers reject, Casey never tries to exaggerate his life's journey into an ... adventure full of drugs, murder, rape and dinosaurs wrote Schmidty of iHipHop. Then, his potential was remarked about the album. iHipHop wrote "Sleeping In Class may not be Casey’s defining moment, but it could be a key character builder leading up to that moment." Schmidty wrote " There is no denying that this kid’s got some serious potential."
