= Chum (song) =

2012 debut single by Earl Sweatshirt

Single by Earl Sweatshirt

from the album Doris
- Released: November 2, 2012
- Recorded: 2012; Paramount Recording Studios (Hollywood, California)
- Genre: Alternative hip hop; jazz rap
- Length: 4:04
- Label: Tan Cressida
- Songwriters: Thebe Kgositsile; Kehinde Hassan; Taiwo Hassan; Chad Hugo
- Producers: randomblackdude; Christian Rich; Hugo

Earl Sweatshirt singles chronology
"Elimination Chamber" (2012)	"Chum" (2012)	"Super Rich Kids" (2013)

Music video
- "Chum" on YouTube

"Chum" is a song by American rapper Earl Sweatshirt, released as the lead single of his 2013 debut album Doris.

== Production and composition ==
"Chum" deals with Earl Sweatshirt's feelings and thoughts after a week since his return from Samoa in 2012. These would include his absent father, his relationship with his mom, and being raised with problems about his identity. According to Syd tha Kyd, "Everybody had missed him so much and nobody really knew what to say. At the same time, Thebe had his own plans and he was kinda scared, cause he didn’t want to disappoint anyone."

Production duo Christian Rich helped Sweatshirt produce "Chum". Sweatshirt had heard of the two before, and the duo met with Sony's A&R staff for Sweatshirt to hear their beats. According to a member of the duo Kehinde Hassan, "he was going nuts in the studio like, “Wow, okay listen, you guys got to do this project with me.”" Sweatshirt's first album Doris was produced over the course of about four or five months, and "Chum" was created on its first three days of making the LP. The song was produced using Logic Pro, and the beat was the quickest and rawest made on the album. The song was recorded by Julian Prindle at Paramount Recording Studios in Hollywood, California. Jaycen Joshua mixed the track at Larrabee Sound Studios in North Hollywood, and it was later mastered by Dave Kutch at the Mastering Palace in New York City.

Taiwo Hassan wrote the chorus for "Chum", and Sweatshirt came up with the verses. Kehinde Hassan said in an interview with MTV News that "Most of the sessions were about five hours of talking crap — what artists you like and you don't like, having fun — and then he'll just black out and be like, 'OK I got a verse.' That's how 'Chum' worked." The song's instrumentation consists of a tumbling piano loop, a low-octave, fuzzy bass, drums, vocals, and other sampled sounds. Christian Rich originally considered Thom Yorke to perform the hook to make it sound bigger, but Sweatshirt refused, as he didn't want to go for that sound.

Sweatshirt came up with the piano and bass line, and recorded his vocals in one take, while Christian Rich made the drums. The sampled sounds used in the track includes a scream sound effect played at the beginning, which was from a Wu-Tang Clan song the duo listened to years before and wanted to use, a looped recording of Taiwo Hassan saying to the song's engineer "Can you turn that up? Can you get that beat in my headphones louder?", and a sample of Chad Hugo laughing.

== Reception ==
On Pitchfork, it got the "Best New Track" title, with writer Larry Fitzmaurice saying "Only, this isn't a regression. It's someone growing into their lyrical talents as they grow up in real time, and it's more than enough to keep listeners wondering what's next." In a positive HuffPost Contributor article, writer Andres Murillo of SF Critic says "With "Chum," Earl bravely gives a glimpse at these shadowed realities, leaving the emcee producing a perspective so often ignored."

== Personnel ==
Credits are from liner notes.

- Earl Sweatshirt - writer, producer (credited as randomblackdude)
- Chad Hugo - writer, producer of outro, trumpeter
- Christian Rich - producer, writer
- Julian Prindle - recorder
- Jaycen Joshua - mixer
- Ryan Kaul - assistant mixer
- Trehy Harris - assistant mixer
- Dave Kutch - masterer

== Release history ==
Region	Date	Format
United States	November 2, 2012	Digital download

== Left Brain Remix ==
"Chum"

Single by Left Brain
- Released: May 15, 2014
- Recorded: 2012/14
- Genre: Alternative hip hop
- Length: 3:24
- Label: Self-released
- Songwriters: Chad Hugo, Kehinde Hassan, Taiwo Hassan, Thebe Kgositsile

"Chum: Remixed by Left Brain" is a remix song, of the song "Chum" American rapper Earl Sweatshirt, by American producer Left Brain. It was released on May 15, 2014, on The FADER's SoundCloud page.

== Certifications ==
Region	Certification	Certified units/sales
New Zealand (RMNZ)	Gold	15,000^{‡}
United States (RIAA)	Gold	500,000^{‡}
^{‡} Sales+streaming figures based on certification alone.
