= Deathcamp (song) =

2015 song by Tyler, the Creator

Single by Tyler, the Creator featuring Cole Alexander

from the album Cherry Bomb
- Released: April 9, 2015
- Genre: Hip hop; punk rock
- Length: 3:09 (album version): 6:30 (video version)
- Label: Odd Future
- Songwriters: Tyler Okonma; Herman Weems
- Producer: Tyler, the Creator

Tyler, the Creator singles chronology
"Whoa" (2013)	"Deathcamp" / "Fucking Young / Perfect" (2015)	"Go (Gas)" (2016)

Music video
- "Tyler, the Creator - Fucking Young" on YouTube

"Deathcamp" is a song by American rapper and producer Tyler, the Creator featuring American guitarist Cole Alexander, and serves as the first track from the Tyler's fourth album Cherry Bomb (2015). It was released alongside "Fucking Young / Perfect" as the album's lead single on April 9, 2015. The song was written and produced by Tyler, the Creator, with Herman Weems receiving additional writing credits for the sampling of his 1971 song, "Why Can't There Be Love", sung by Dee Edwards.

== Background and release ==
On April 9, 2015, Tyler, the Creator formally announced on Twitter that Cherry Bomb would be releasing April 13, the next week, and released the songs "Deathcamp" alongside "Fucking Young / Perfect" as the lead singles from the album on the iTunes Store.

== Composition and lyrics ==
"Deathcamp" features a sample of "Why Can’t There Be Love" sung by Dee Edwards and written by Herman Weems. The song's instrumental is very aggressive, even being compared to metal songs. Like many of his earlier songs, he conveys the topic in an intentionally aggressive and offensive way. Tyler, the Creator also quotes La Di Da Di by Slick Rick. The song was allegedly inspired by The Stooges as well as N.E.R.D.

== Critical reception ==
"Deathcamp" has been compared to N.E.R.D.'s debut album In Search of... (2001), particularly the song "Lapdance". Tyler, the Creator specifically mentions the album in the song with the lines "In Search of... did more for me than Illmatic". Andrew Unterberger of Spin also compared "Deathcamp" to In Search of... and also pointed out its four-count intro commonly used in Pharrell-produced songs. Matthew Ramirez of Pitchfork likened "Deathcamp" to the Stooges, Glassjaw, Trash Talk (who Tyler, the Creator and Odd Future signed), Lil Wayne's seventh studio album Rebirth as well as N.E.R.D. It has also been compared to experimental hip hop group Death Grips.

== Music video ==
A small visual for "Deathcamp" is included in the music video for Cherry Bomb's other lead single, "Fucking Young". The video was released on the same day the singles were released.

The "Deathcamp" portion picks up where the "Fucking Young" left off, with Tyler, the Creator getting thrown out of a cinema in the middle of a desert by the employees. He gets up, with some Odd Future members walking up behind him, and throws a small bomb at them, blowing them away. After this, the cinema employees chase after them in a white van. Tyler, the Creator and the Odd Future members drive off in vehicles, Tyler, the Creator driving a go-kart. At the end of the video, Tyler, the Creator faces the cinema employees' van and launches another bomb at them with a slingshot. It features guest cameos from Charlie Wilson, Chaz Bundick and Cole Alexander.

== Copyright infringement lawsuit ==
On March 23, 2018, Tyler, the Creator was accused of copyright infringement and sued for $750,000 in damages by Lela Weems. She alleged that the song illegally sampled the 1971 song, "Why Can’t There Be Love" composed by the late Herman Weems and sung by Dee Edwards. Following Herman's death, Lela became the sole owner of the song's copyright. Weems alleged that "Deathcamp" used the beat of Edwards' song.

On May 22, 2018, the case was settled, and in all subsequent releases, Herman Weems is listed as a co-songwriter on "Deathcamp". In the Cherry Bomb Documentary from 2015, Tyler, the Creator stated that the sample was rejected shortly before the release of the album, and so he had Cole Alexander re-record the guitar.

The court documents are available for viewing as of 2024.

== Personnel ==
Credits adapted from the vinyl liner notes of Cherry Bomb, with video credits adapted from the song's music video.

=== Musicians ===
- Tyler, the Creator – vocals, songwriting, recording
- Cole Alexander – additional vocals and guitar
- Mike Einziger - additional production

=== Video ===
- Wolf Haley - video director
- Luis Ponch Perez - director of photography
- Tara Razavi - executive production

=== Technical ===
- Vic Wainstein – recording
- Syd Bennett – recording
- Mick Guzauski – mixing
- Brian "Big Bass" Gardner – mastering
- Jack DeBoe – additional engineering

== Charts ==
Chart (2015)	Peak position
US Bubbling Under R&B/Hip-Hop Singles (Billboard)	7
US Rap Digital Song Sales (Billboard)	31
