= Smuckers (song) =

Song by Tyler, the Creator featuring Lil Wayne and Kanye West

from the album Cherry Bomb
- Released: April 13, 2015
- Recorded: 2011–2015
- Genre: Hip hop
- Length: 5:34
- Label: Odd Future
- Songwriters: Tyler Okonma; Kanye West; Dwayne Carter, Jr.; Gabriele Ducros; Jerome Mbuyi
- Producer: Tyler, the Creator

"Smuckers" is a song by the American rapper and producer Tyler, the Creator featuring fellow American rappers Lil Wayne and Kanye West, from Tyler's fourth studio album Cherry Bomb (2015). It features background vocals from Samantha Nelson. The song was written by the three lead artists with Gabriele Ducros, and was produced by Tyler.

== Background and release ==
After Tyler, the Creator uploaded his upcoming fourth studio album, Cherry Bomb, for pre-order on iTunes, Complex discovered that a track from the upcoming album had featured Kanye West and Lil Wayne. After the album's release, the song featuring the two artists was revealed to be the album's eleventh track, "Smuckers".

In an interview with Billboard on April 23, 2015, Tyler revealed that the beat for "Smuckers" was originally made in 2011, with the intention to send the beat to Jay-Z and West, but eventually kept the beat for himself. Tyler further revealed that "Smuckers" was the final song finished for Cherry Bomb, and that he had added more to the song, specifically "bells and a harder bass, strings and french horns," to his and Kanye's verse, four hours after the album was due.

== Composition and writing ==
The song includes a sample of "Metropolis Notte" by Gabriele Ducros. Its first verse is rapped by Tyler, the second is rapped by West, whilst the third and final verse is rapped by both Tyler and Wayne. West explained that he rewrote his verse after hearing Tyler and Wayne on "Smuckers" in Tyler's 2017 documentary about Cherry Bomb.

== Commercial performance ==
"Smuckers" reached number 8 on the US Billboard Bubbling Under R&B/Hip-Hop Singles chart upon the album's release, making the song the only non-single release from it to chart.

== Live performance ==
The track was performed by Tyler on Jimmy Kimmel Live! in July 2015 alongside the album's title track.

== Charts ==
| Chart (2015) | Peak position |
|---|---|
| US Bubbling Under R&B/Hip-Hop Singles (Billboard) | 8 |
