= Customized Greatly Vol. 3 =

Mixtape by Casey Veggies
- Released: April 9, 2012
- Recorded: 2011–2012
- Genre: Hip hop
- Length: 67:56
- Label: Self-released
- Producers: Uncle Dave; Preme Beats; Woody; Roosevelt; J Poundz; Fly Union; FreshChuck; Krysshun; Tyler, the Creator; Wes Dees; Beats4Clothes; Polyester; S.O.T.U.; JHawk; Tha Business; Sha Baby

Casey Veggies chronology
Sleeping in Class: Deluxe Edition (2011)	Customized Greatly Vol. 3 (2012)	Life Changes (2013)

Customized Greatly Vol. 3 is the fifth mixtape by American rapper Casey Veggies. It was self-released on April 9, 2012. The mixtape features guest appearances from Jhené Aiko, Tyler, the Creator, Raheem DeVaughn, Earl Sweatshirt, Domo Genesis, and Hodgy Beats, among others.

== Track listing ==
No.	Title	Writer(s)	Producer(s)	Length
1.	"Customized Greatly (Intro)"	Casey Jones	Uncle Dave	3:25
2.	"Garden"	Jones	Preme Beats	5:20
3.	"Toe Tag"	Jones	Woody	3:47
4.	"Roses"	Jones	Roosevelt	3:38
5.	"Swag Worth a Mill"	Jones	Preme Beats	2:02
6.	"Go Crazy"	Jones	J Poundz	3:17
7.	"When You See The Kid"	Jones	Fly Union	3:00
8.	"Life Rhymes" (featuring Jhené Aiko)	Jones; Jhené Chilombo	FreshChuck	4:00
9.	"Nobody"	Jones	Krysshun	3:42
10.	"PNCINTLOFWGKTA" (featuring Tyler, The Creator, Domo Genesis, Hodgy Beats, and Earl Sweatshirt)	Jones; Tyler Okonma; Dominique Cole; Gerard Long; Thebe Kgositsile	Tyler, The Creator	4:17
11.	"You Got It" / "Fantasy"	Jones	Wes Dees; Beats4Clothes	8:01
12.	"Sex Sells"	Jones; Christopher Cleveland	Polyester; S.O.T.U.	3:52
13.	"Get That $"	Jones; Cleveland	Polyester	3:07
14.	"Verified"	Jones; Jeremy Hawkins	JHawk	3:39
15.	"Thoughts Weigh" (featuring Raheem DeVaughn)	Jones; Raheem DeVaughn	Tha Business	4:29
16.	"Euphoria III"	Jones	Sha Baby	2:37
17.	"Maybe, I Should Go"	Jones	FreshChuck	5:54
Total length:				67:56
