= Whoa (Earl Sweatshirt song) =

Single by Earl Sweatshirt featuring Tyler, the Creator

from the album Doris
- Released: March 12, 2013
- Recorded: 2012
- Studio: Paramount Recording Studios (Hollywood, California)
- Genre: Alternative hip hop
- Length: 3:16
- Label: Tan Cressida; Columbia
- Songwriter(s): Thebe Kgositsile; Tyler Okonma
- Producer(s): Tyler, The Creator

Earl Sweatshirt singles chronology
"Super Rich Kids" (2013)	"Whoa" (2013)	"Hive" (2013)

Tyler, the Creator singles chronology
"Domo23" (2013)	"Whoa" (2013)	"Deathcamp" / "Fucking Young / Perfect" (2015)

Music video
- "WHOA" on YouTube

"Whoa" is a song by the American rapper Earl Sweatshirt featuring and produced by fellow American rapper Tyler, the Creator. Written by both, it was released on March 12, 2013 by Tan Cressida and Columbia as the second single from his debut studio album Doris. It was recorded at Paramount Recording Studios in Hollywood, California.

== Music video ==
The music video was released on March 11, 2013 on the official Odd Future YouTube channel. It was directed by Tyler, The Creator's alter-ego Wolf Haley. It currently has over 27 million views as of November 2020.

== Personnel ==
- Earl Sweatshirt – performer, writer,
- Tyler, The Creator – performer, writer, producer
- Vic Wainstein – engineer
- Jaycen Joshua – engineer
- Dave Kutch – engineer

== Charts ==
Chart performance for "Whoa"
Chart (2013)	Peak position
US Hot R&B/Hip-Hop Songs (Billboard)	46
