= Ro Ransom =

American rapper (born 1993)

- Also known as: Nero
- Born: Noah Dean Larkin Gale; January 7, 1993 (age 33); Queens, New York, U.S.
- Origin: Harlem, Manhattan, New York, U.S.
- Genre: Hip hop
- Occupations: Rapper; singer; songwriter; record producer
- Years active: 2011–present
- Labels: S-Rank Records; Same Plate; Sony

Noah Dean Larkin Gale (born 1993), professionally known as Ro Ransom, is an American rapper, singer, songwriter, and record producer from Manhattan, New York. He had a breakthrough hit with his 2016 single "See Me Fall".

== Early life ==
Noah Gale was born in Queens, New York and grew up in the Harlem neighborhood of Manhattan.

He wrote his first raps in middle school and began releasing music at age 16 in 2009 using the stage name Nero.

== Career ==
In 2011, Gale began using the stage name Ro Ransom to avoid confusion with an EDM group also named Nero. He had also considered "Young Coyote" as his pseudonym. In 2012, he released a remix of the Purity Ring song "Odebear" and followed that with his first mixtape using the Ro Ransom moniker, Ransomnia. That collection featured the single "Deadman Wonderland" and guest appearances from Trae tha Truth, Casey Veggies, 10ille, Chuck Inglish, AraabMuzik and Ricky Hil.

In October 2014, Ransom released his second mixtape, Ro Ransom is the Future. The collection featured the single "Anaconda Vise". It had two bonus discs, one with extra songs and a third disc containing a collection a freestyles, only released to his fanclub. In August 2015, he released the single "See Me Fall" (featuring Kensei Abbot) which would go on to become a viral hit. He released a music video for the song that December, and a remixed version by Y2K came out in March 2016.

Throughout 2016, Ro also released several other tracks including "Talk Too Much", "Donuts" (featuring Kensei Abbot), "Invented Swag" (featuring Kensei Abbot and Nessly), and "Doppelgänger". Early in 2017, he opened for Dua Lipa on her first North American tour. He secured a writing placement on Khalid's American Teen album, co-writing the song "Let's Go". In October 2017, he released a mixtape called Momentum while on tour with Connecticut rapper Witt Lowry. It featured the aforementioned "See Me Fall", "Prettiest", and "Doppelgänger" as well as the single "Prettiest" featuring Jazz Cartier.

In April 2018, Ransom released the song "Floetry" (featuring Kensei Abbot), which was his first single to be released on Same Plate Entertainment, a joint venture label with Sony Music. In June of that year, he released the single "Wraith", a song influenced by 1990s R&B acts like TLC and Destiny's Child. The song would get an official remix from Y2K in January 2019. In September 2018, Ransom released his first and only project with Same Plate/Sony, the EP Possessed.

== Discography ==
=== EPs ===
List of EPs with selected details
Title	Details
Possessed	Released: September 14, 2018 (US); Label: Same Plate, Sony; Formats: Digital download

=== Singles ===
List of singles with selected details
Title	Year	Album
"Deadman Wonderland"	2012	Ransomnia
"Anaconda Vise"	2014	Ro Ransom is the Future
"See Me Fall" (feat. Kensei Abbot)	2015	Momentum
"Doppelgänger	2016	Momentum
"Prettiest" (feat. Jazz Cartier)	2017	Momentum
"Floetry" (feat. Kensei Abbot)	2018	Possessed
"Wraith"	2018	Possessed

=== Mixtapes ===
List of mixtapes with selected details
Title	Details
Ransomnia	Released: July 3, 2012 (US); Label: Self-released; Formats: Digital download
Ro Ransom is the Future	Released: October 30, 2014 (Second disc released November 13, 2014; US); Label: S-Rank; Formats: Digital download
Momentum	Released: October 27, 2017 (US); Label: S-Rank; Formats: Digital download
