= Hive (song) =

Single by Earl Sweatshirt featuring Casey Veggies and Vince Staples

from the album Doris
- Released: July 16, 2013
- Recorded: 2013 (3 hours); Syd tha Kyd and Matt Martians's Old House (Marina del Rey, California)
- Genre: Alternative hip hop; minimal; electronic
- Length: 4:38
- Label: Tan Cressida
- Songwriters: Thebe Kgositsile; Vince Staples; Casey Jones
- Producers: randomblackdude; Matt Martians

Earl Sweatshirt singles chronology
"Whoa" (2013)	"Hive" (2013)	"Reform School" (2013)

Casey Veggies singles chronology
"Hive" (2013)	"The Boy" (2014)

Vince Staples singles chronology
"Guns & Roses" (2013)	"Hive" (2013)	"Nate" (2014)

Music video
- "Hive" on YouTube

"Hive" is a song by American rapper Earl Sweatshirt, featuring Casey Veggies and Vince Staples, and the third single from his debut studio album Doris. The writing, recording, production and engineering of the track took place at Syd tha Kyd and Matt Martians' old home, and it was recorded in three hours. The lyrics of the slow-tempo song describes the rapper's image, who says that he wants his critics and interns to call him nothing less than a synonym of menace. Its music video was directed by Hiro Murai.

== Production and release ==
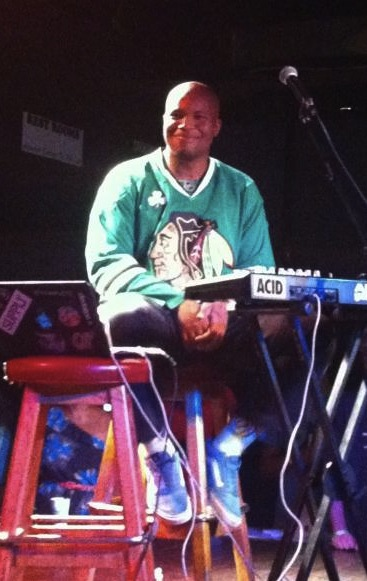
Matt Martians helped Earl Sweatshirt produce "Hive".

"Hive" was written, recorded, produced, and engineered in the living room of Syd tha Kyd and Matt Martians' old home in Marina del Rey, California; the music was programmed in Reason. The beat, according to Martians, "got kinda tight, then we started rapping. Next thing we know, Casey comes over with his crew, and there’s like 12 people in our living room, all rapping around Thebe. The mic is in the middle of the room, and Thebe is rapping in front of everybody."

The song took a total of three hours to record, with Sweatshirt's verse recorded in only one take before Casey Veggies and Vince Staples did theirs. Martians said that Sweatshirt "works quickly in general: he gets his initial ideas out quickly, then goes back and makes adjustments. That’s a mature thing about his music-making. He knows what he wants to do and what kinds of feelings he wants to convey." The track was later mixed by Jaycen Joshua at Larrabee Sound Studios in North Hollywood, California, and mastered by Dave Kutch at the Mastering Palace in New York City.

Sweatshirt first performed "Hive" at the Low End Theory in Los Angeles on March 6, 2013, and later at 2013 South by Southwest music festival. On July 16, he performed it at the first 2013 uncapped vitaminwater and Fader show in New York, and the song's music video and single was released shortly thereafter. The track appears on Sweatshirt's debut album Doris, which was released on August 20.

== Composition and critical reception ==
"Hive" received critical acclaim from music critics upon its release. "Hive" has a slow tempo. Pitchfork Media wrote the song "doesn't necessarily indicate that he's [Earl Sweatshirt's] been in the lab fleshing out new musical directions. Instead, he’s pushing his deliriously inventive talents further, to work through things that continue to define him." Critics noted its use of a "thick, ominous, slow-moving bass-roll, [...] tingly echoing drums..." and light ambience. The reason for the song's recording location was to make live instrumentation for the track. Although the song has a less playful feel than "Chum", production similarities with that track were also pointed out by reviewers. WhatCulture! described the instrumental track as "minimalistic as it gets... showcasing the raps even more clear."

Earl Sweatshirt's verse focuses on his control over his image, saying that he wants his critics and interns to name him at least a synonym of menace. AbsolutePunk said Sweatshirt describes "how his technical ability as a rapper makes his more crude moments much more interesting than they would be if he just came out and said vulgar things without veiling them with dizzying rhymes and metaphors." Writing for Consequence of Sound, Mike Madden called the opening blasphemy lyric, “Promise Heron I’ll put my fist up after I get my dick sucked”, "the Doris line that stays lodged in my head..." Billboard described "Hive" as "the first track [from Doris] where Earl's rapping style (of trying to cram as many words into a short phrase as possible) starts to feel slightly repetitive", and found Sweatshirt's "emphasis on syllables" similar to that on his previous track "Earl". Vince Staples' rap differentiates with Sweatshirt's, and references the Holocaust in which, according to SPIN, it "injects the small-town terror vibes with some heavy subject matter..."

Both Prefix Magazine and MTV Hive named "Hive" a highlight of Doris, with Prefix writing that Sweatshirt's rap in the song was the "most ambitious" out of the entire album. In another review of the LP, the song became an AllMusic pick track.

== Music video ==
The music video for "Hive" premiered July 15, 2013. It was directed by Hiro Murai and produced by Jason Colon and Danielle Hinde. Editing was done by Isaac Hagy, with cinematography by Larkin Seiple. It features slowly panned cameras Sweatshirt in dimly lit rooms and on moonroofs with Casey Veggies and Vince Staples, while he is around bikers wearing SBTRKT-like masks. Murai described the video as:

"a slightly different vibe [than "Chum"], but we kind of had something that we already built and we were just building off of what we did for “Chum.” Odd Future has this very specific brand, but Earl was clearly looking to do something a little more low-key and restrained. So there was a lot of back and forth trying to figure out where we were idea-wise."

The masks were based on old Halloween costumes and a compilation book of drawings by David Lynch. Murai described the drawings as "like terrifying children in Halloween masks from the ‘30s and ‘40s. They’re all just really crudely put together. They’re all literally just like, bags with eyes and mouths drawn on them, but they’re just so awful and terrifying just because it looks so poorly put together." Murai also said the masks were "related to what we did with “Chum.” We were kind of just playing with the images and idea of masks, so we wanted to expand on that a little bit."

== Personnel ==
Credits from liner notes of Doris:

- Earl Sweatshirt – performer, writer, producer (credited producer as randomblackdude)
- Vince Staples – performer, writer
- Casey Veggies – performer, writer
- Matt Martians – producer
- Syd tha Kyd – engineer

== Charts ==
Chart (2013–14)	Peak position
US Bubbling Under R&B/Hip-Hop Singles (Billboard)	7
US R&B/Hip-Hop Digital Songs (Billboard)	37

== Certifications ==
Region	Certification	Certified units/sales
United States (RIAA)	Gold	500,000^{‡}
^{‡} Sales+streaming figures based on certification alone.
