= Doris (album) =

Studio album by Earl Sweatshirt
- Released: August 20, 2013
- Recorded: February 2012 – July 2013
- Studios: The Chemistry Lab (Santa Monica); Encore; Glenwood Place (Burbank); Flagstaff (Marina del Rey); Paramount; Two Thousand One; Whitelines Laboratories (Hollywood); The Sanctuary (Narnia, California)
- Genre: Hip-hop
- Length: 44:07
- Labels: Tan Cressida; Odd Future; Columbia
- Producers: BadBadNotGood; Christian Rich; Earl Sweatshirt; Frank Ocean; Matt Martians; Michael "Uzi" Uzowuru; The Neptunes; RZA; Samiyam; Tyler, the Creator

Earl Sweatshirt chronology
Earl (2010)	Doris (2013)	I Don't Like Shit, I Don't Go Outside (2015)

Vinyl cover

Singles from Doris
- 1. "Chum" Released: November 1, 2012; 2. "Whoa" Released: March 12, 2013; 3. "Hive" Released: July 16, 2013

Doris is the debut studio album by American rapper Earl Sweatshirt. It was released on August 20, 2013, through Odd Future Records and Tan Cressida Records, and distributed by Columbia Records. Doris follows his first mixtape, Earl, which was released in 2010 when he was sixteen. After returning from a forced stay in a Samoan boarding school, he began working on his debut album and signed a deal with Columbia, rather than Odd Future's Odd Future Records.

Doris features guest appearances from Vince Staples, Tyler, the Creator, Domo Genesis, Frank Ocean, SK La' Flare, Casey Veggies, Mac Miller, and RZA. Production was primarily handled by Sweatshirt under the pseudonym randomblackdude, alongside Christian Rich, Tyler, the Creator, the Neptunes, BadBadNotGood, Matt Martians, Samiyam, Frank Ocean, and RZA. The album was supported by three singles; "Chum", "Whoa", and "Hive".

Doris received widespread acclaim from critics, who praised Sweatshirt's lyricism and rhyme schemes along with the gritty underground production. The album also appeared on numerous critics' year-end lists. The album fared well commercially, debuting at number five on the US Billboard 200.

== Background ==
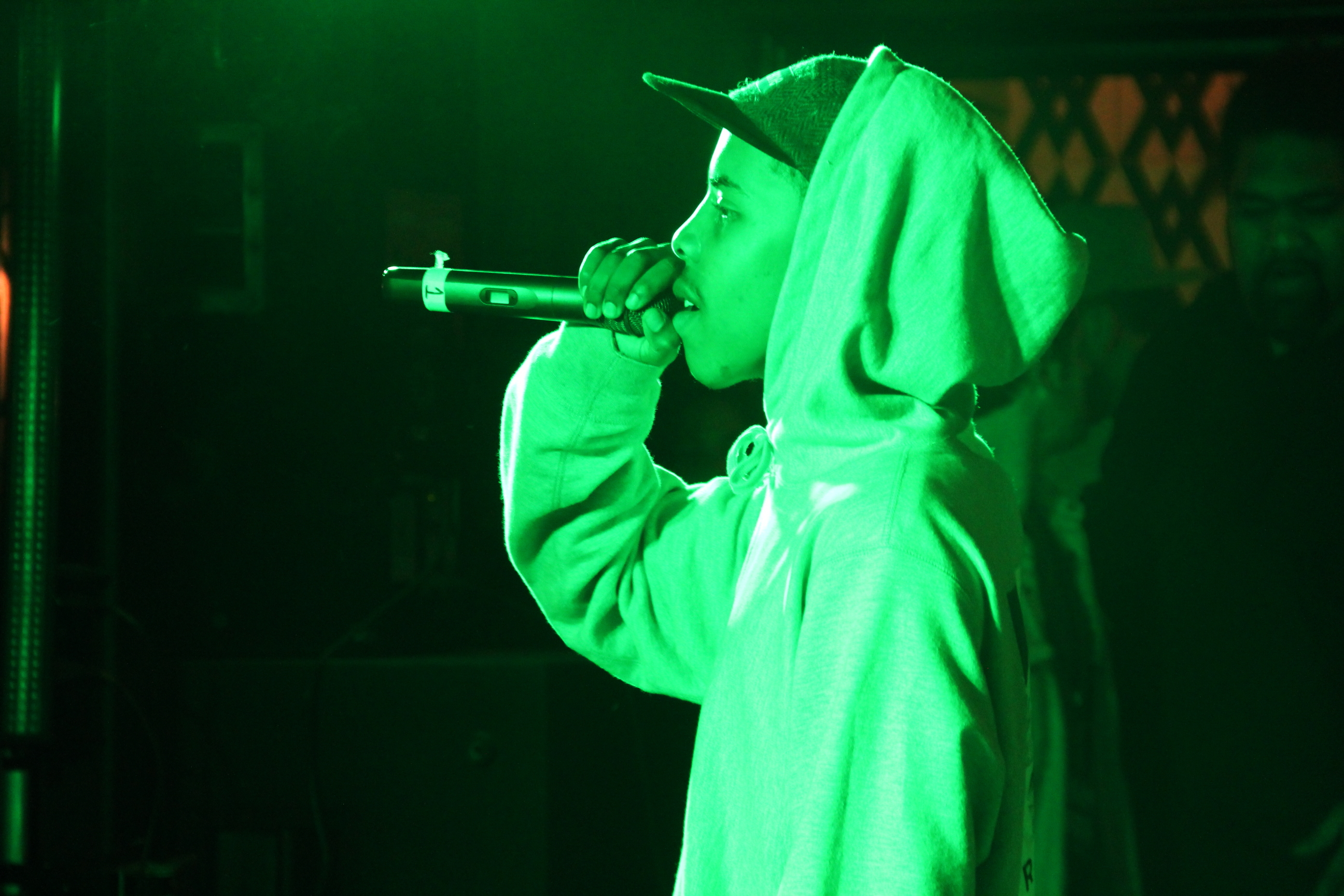
Doris serves as Earl Sweatshirt's debut studio album.

On February 8, 2012, rumors spread around the internet that Earl Sweatshirt had returned to the US from Coral Reef Academy in Samoa when a video of him surfaced on YouTube with a preview of a new song. He said if people wanted "the full thing" they would have to give him 50,000 followers on Twitter. He later confirmed on his new Twitter account that he had returned to his home in Los Angeles. Three hours later, Sweatshirt reached 50,000 followers and released a new song on his website, entitled "Home", which ends with "...and I'm back. Bye". Sweatshirt later said via Twitter that all the songs released prior to Oldie were old songs that he recorded before going abroad. On the same day Earl launched his website Terttlefer.com, which was later changed to Earlxsweat.com (after his Twitter username), and finally Earlsweatshirt.com. On May 2, 2012, Sweatshirt created his own record label imprint called Tan Cressida, which will be distributed through Columbia Records. He turned down several larger offers due to his priority of remaining close to Odd Future.

On November 12, 2012, Earl announced on his Twitter account that his first and second studio albums titled Doris and Gnossos. Doris was reported to feature vocals or production from Tyler, the Creator, Frank Ocean, Om'Mas Keith, Thundercat, Domo Genesis, the Neptunes, Christian Rich, Vince Staples, BadBadNotGood, Pharrell Williams, Samiyam, The Alchemist, Casey Veggies and The Internet.

On March 6, 2013, while performing with Flying Lotus and Mac Miller, Earl premiered three new songs off Doris, "Burgundy" produced by the Neptunes, "Hive" featuring Casey Veggies and Vince Staples, and "Guild" featuring Mac Miller. At Coachella 2013 Earl presented "Hive", "Burgundy", and "Guild", as well as "20 Wave Caps". At Syracuse, he previewed "Molasses" featuring RZA of the Wu-Tang Clan. On July 12, 2013, Earl announced that the album would be released on August 20, 2013, and released the album cover and track listing.

== Recording ==
Sweatshirt worked with the Neptunes and Chicago-based production duo Christian Rich for the track "Burgundy". Sweatshirt had heard of the two before, and the duo met with Sony's A&R staff for Sweatshirt to hear their beats. Taiwo Hassan of Christian Rich revealed to MTV News that Pharrell Williams spent most of the day working on Robin Thicke's hit song "Blurred Lines", but took a short break to work on "Burgundy" with Neptunes member Chad Hugo. The song title does not appear in the lyrics, but is a reference to Earl's grandmother's burgundy carpet. The song contains a sample from Preacher's "The Power of the Truth".

The album was produced over the course of about four or five months and its lead single "Chum" was created in the first three days. The song was produced by Christian Rich using Logic Pro and the beat was the quickest and rawest made on the album. The track was recorded by Julian Prindle at Paramount Recording Studios in Hollywood, California. Jaycen Joshua mixed the track at Larrabee Sound Studios in North Hollywood, and it was later mastered by Dave Kutch at the Mastering Palace in New York City. Taiwo Hassan wrote the chorus for "Chum", and Sweatshirt wrote the verses. The song's instrumentation consists of a tumbling piano loop, a low-octave, fuzzy bass, drums, vocals, and other sampled sounds. Christian Rich originally considered Radiohead singer Thom Yorke to perform the hook to make it sound bigger, but Sweatshirt refused, as he didn't want to go for that sound.

"Sunday" features fellow Odd Future member Frank Ocean. The song is seen as unusual for Ocean who is renowned for his singing rather than his rapping, having previously only shown off his rapping on the leaked track "Blue Whale" and "Oldie". The duo had previously collaborated on Ocean's "Super Rich Kids" from Ocean's 2012 album Channel Orange. The song raised minor controversy regarding Ocean's verse, which included lyrics regarding Ocean's reported brawl with Chris Brown. The song went through many different incarnations and mixes before being completed; the original version was lost after Earl's laptop's hard drive crashed. After reassembling it, he decided that he hated the mixes. "Then it was, 'We can't mix this song'", he told NME, "'...you're going to have to redo it or do a song'. I threw a tantrum. I did a new song".

"Hive" was written, recorded, produced and engineered in the living room of Syd tha Kyd and Matt Martians' old home in Marina del Rey, California; the music was programmed in Reason. The song took three hours to record, with Sweatshirt's verse recorded in only one take before Casey Veggies and Vince Staples did theirs. Martians said that Sweatshirt "works quickly in general: he gets his initial ideas out quickly, then goes back and makes adjustments. That's a mature thing about his music-making. He knows what he wants to do and what kinds of feelings he wants to convey". The track was later mixed by Jaycen Joshua at Larrabee Sound Studios in North Hollywood, California, and mastered by Dave Kutch at the Mastering Palace in New York City.

== Promotion ==
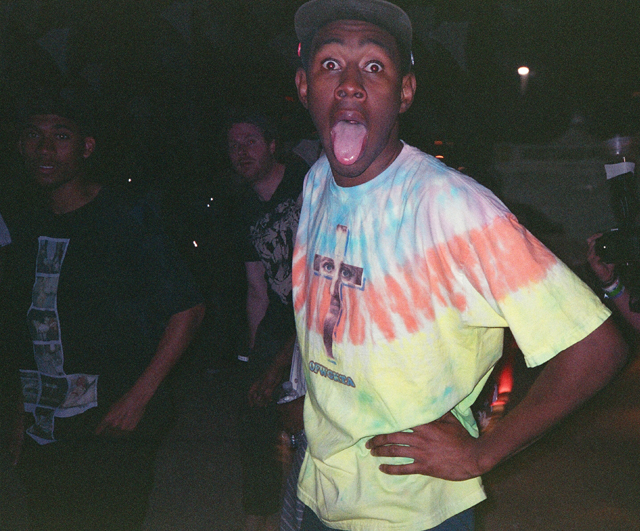
Earl Sweatshirt toured in promotion of Doris with fellow Odd Future member Tyler, the Creator.

The album's lead single, "Chum", was released on November 1, 2012. The music video for "Chum" was released on December 4, 2012. The album's second single, "Whoa" featuring Tyler, the Creator, was released on March 12, 2013, along with the music video being released, which was directed by Tyler, the Creator. The album's third single, "Hive" featuring Vince Staples and Casey Veggies, was released on July 16, 2013, as well an accompanying music video was then released later that day.

From April 30 through May 18, 2013, Earl Sweatshirt toured the West Coast of the United States with Tyler, the Creator on his tour for Wolf. On August 9, 2013, Sweatshirt made his national television debut, performing the Neptunes-produced "Burgundy" on Late Night with Jimmy Fallon. On September 10, 2013, Earl Sweatshirt announced his first solo-headlining concert tour titled Doris. The tour ran from October 6 through November 9, 2013, and featured supporting acts by Hodgy Beats, Domo Genesis and Vince Staples.

== Critical reception ==
Professional ratings
Aggregate scores
Source	Rating
AnyDecentMusic?	8.0/10
Metacritic	82/100
Review scores
Source	Rating
AllMusic	4/5 stars
The A.V. Club	C+
The Guardian	5/5 stars
The Irish Times	4/5 stars
Los Angeles Times	4/4 stars
NME	8/10
Pitchfork	8.3/10
Rolling Stone	3.5/5 stars
Spin	8/10
XXL	4/5

Doris was met with widespread critical acclaim. At Metacritic, which assigns a normalized rating out of 100 to reviews from mainstream publications, the album received an average score of 82, based on 32 reviews. Aggregator AnyDecentMusic? gave it 8.0 out of 10, based on their assessment of the critical consensus.

William Gruger of Billboard said, "What follows is Doris, a slow (rarely rising above 70 bpm), introspective album where Earl Sweatshirt combats pressures when returning to a life of stardom after time spent at a Samoa-based boarding school for troubled youths". Ben Beaumont-Thomas of The Guardian said, "This is knockabout punchline rap made into high art, a psychedelic visionquest to the taqueria on a skateboard". Randall Roberts of Los Angeles Times said, "Doris features instrumental interludes, expanded mid-song diversions and enough surprise to warrant repeated—obsessive—evaluation". Jesse Fairfax of HipHopDX said, "Where he has yet to master the art of making complete songs ("Uncle Al" clocks in under a minute long) and his diction tends to lacks clarity, Earl paints pictures in a manner more poetic than just about all within his peer group". Kevin Ritchie of Now said, "Despite all the gifted-beyond-his-years hype, that over-arching concerns still feel inextricably teenaged, albeit precociously so".

Simon Vozick-Levinson of Rolling Stone said, "His rhyme schemes are as complex as ever, and these resolutely unpop beats – sticky-icky sample collages from producers including Pharrell, RZA and himself – are an ideal canvas. But his subject matter has undergone a drastic overhaul. Unlike some peers, Earl has figured out that shock value only goes so far". David Jeffries of AllMusic said, "Doris is unsettled, messy, and takes a bit to sort, but there are codes to crack and rich rewards to reap, so enter with an open mind and prepare to leave exhausted". Aaron Matthews of Exclaim! said, "Doris isn't the classic many anticipated, but it is a strong, uncompromised debut from a very talented young rapper. For now, that's enough". Michael Madden of Consequence said, "It's a work as notable for its technical achievements as its nuanced themes, and that's almost as impressive considering that so many artists lack in one or both of those fields". Jonah Bromwich of NME said, "He doesn't want to be a powerhouse rap star. Doris may alienate people looking for him to be that. For everyone else, this is a powerful record".

Darryl G. Wright of PopMatters said, "Doris represents one of the most innovative and important hip-hop releases of the year. Not just because of the charm and intrigue of Earl's story but because of the immense and understated level of his talent for writing rhymes". Craig Jenkins of Pitchfork said, "As comebacks go, it's shockingly insular and unassuming. Even when he skirts the mainstream, he does so with cautious optimism". Jesse Cataldo of Slant Magazine said, "Earl may be one of the quieter voices on Doris, but his dense, evocative sensibility dominates the album both lyrically and musically". Dan Jackson of XXL said, "As one might expect from a 19-year-old, this is an album of extremes. It can be poignant and honest in one moment, then cagey and distant in the next". Julianne Escobedo Shepherd of Spin said, "The record is at its best when he simply shifts into verbal overdrive, spitting gnarled bullets on the phenomenal robber's fable "Centurion" or the weedy hallucinogen "Guild"". Evan Rytlewski of The A.V. Club said, "It often feels less like a finished work than a sketchbook, a jumble of beats and raps (about half of them from guests) with little in the way of hooks, choruses, or general songcraft to tie them together".

=== Year-end lists ===
Closing out the year, Doris was named to multiple "Album of the Year" lists for 2013. Nick Catucci of Entertainment Weekly named it the tenth best album of 2013. NME ranked it number 27 on their list of the 50 best albums of 2013. Complex ranked it number 11 on their list of the 50 best albums of 2013. PopMatters named it the sixth best hip-hop album of the year.

The album was named the eighth best hip-hop album of 2013 by Exclaim!. The album was positioned at number 42 on Rolling Stone's list of the 50 best albums of 2013. Spin ranked it at number 31 on their list of the 50 best albums of 2013. Consequence ranked it at number 39 on their list of the 50 best albums of 2013. It was positioned at number 22 on Pigeons & Planes' list of the best albums of 2013. Mojo ranked it at number 23 on their list of the top 50 albums of the year. Paste positioned it at number 43 on their list of the 50 best albums of 2013.

Select year-end rankings of Doris
Publication	List	Rank	Ref.
Complex	The 50 Best Albums of 2013	11	
Consequence	The 50 Best Albums of 2013	39	
Entertainment Weekly	The 10 Best Albums of 2013	10	
Exclaim!	Top 10 Hip-Hop Albums	8	
NME	The Top 50 Best Albums of 2013	27	
Pitchfork	The Top 50 Albums of 2013	19	
Rolling Stone	The 50 Best Albums of 2013	42	
Spin	The 50 Best Albums of 2013	31	
The Wire	Releases of the Year 1–50	34	
XXL	The Top 25 Albums of 2013	7	

== Commercial performance ==
Doris debuted at number five on the US Billboard 200, with first-week sales of 49,000 copies in the United States. In its second week, the album sold 8,000 more copies. In its third week, the album sold 4,000 more copies bringing its total album sales to 62,000.

== Track listing ==
Credits were adapted from the album's liner notes and Tidal.

Doris track listing
No.	Title	Writer(s)	Producer(s)	Length
1.	"Pre" (featuring SK La' Flare)	Thebe Kgositsile; Shakeir Duarte	Michael "Uzi" Uzowuru	2:52
2.	"Burgundy" (featuring Vince Staples)	Kgositsile; Pharrell Williams; Chad Hugo	The Neptunes	2:07
3.	"20 Wave Caps" (featuring Domo Genesis)	Kgositsile; Dominique Cole	Samiyam; randomblackdude	2:12
4.	"Sunday" (featuring Frank Ocean)	Kgositsile; Christopher Breaux	randomblackdude; Frank Ocean	3:26
5.	"Hive" (featuring Vince Staples and Casey Veggies)	Kgositsile; Vince Staples; Casey Jones	randomblackdude; Matt Martians	4:37
6.	"Chum"	Kgositsile; Taiwo Hassan; Kehinde Hassan; Hugo	randomblackdude; Christian Rich	4:04
7.	"Sasquatch" (featuring Tyler, the Creator)	Kgositsile; Tyler Okonma	Tyler, the Creator	2:48
8.	"Centurion" (featuring Vince Staples)	Kgositsile; T. Hassan; K. Hassan; Staples; Holger Czukay; Irmin Schmidt; Jaki Liebezeit; Michael Karoli; David Axelrod	Christian Rich	3:04
9.	"523"	Kgositsile	randomblackdude	1:32
10.	"Uncle Al"	Kgositsile	randomblackdude	0:53
11.	"Guild" (featuring Mac Miller)	Kgositsile; Malcolm McCormick	randomblackdude	3:54
12.	"Molasses" (featuring RZA)	Kgositsile; Lennie Hibbert; Clement Dodd	RZA; Christian Rich^{[a]}	2:16
13.	"Whoa" (featuring Tyler, the Creator)	Kgositsile; Okonma	Tyler, the Creator	3:16
14.	"Hoarse"	Kgositsile; Breaux	BadBadNotGood	3:52
15.	"Knight" (featuring Domo Genesis)	Kgositsile; Cole; Paul Willis; Tyrone Douglas	Christian Rich	3:14
Total length:				44:07

Instrumentals edition track listing
No.	Title	Writer(s)	Producer(s)	Length
1.	"Pre (Instrumental)" (featuring SK La' Flare)	Kgositsile; Duarte	Uzowuru	2:52
2.	"Burgundy (Instrumental)" (featuring Vince Staples)	Kgositsile; Williams; Hugo	The Neptunes	2:07
3.	"20 Wave Caps (Instrumental)" (featuring Domo Genesis)	Kgositsile; Cole	Samiyam; randomblackdude	2:12
4.	"Sunday (Instrumental)" (featuring Frank Ocean)	Kgositsile; Breaux	randomblackdude; Frank Ocean	3:26
5.	"Hive (Instrumental)" (featuring Vince Staples and Casey Veggies)	Kgositsile; Staples; Jones	randomblackdude; Martians	4:37
6.	"Chum (Instrumental)"	Kgositsile; T. Hassan; K. Hassan; Hugo	randomblackdude; Christian Rich	4:04
7.	"Sasquatch (Instrumental)" (featuring Tyler, the Creator)	Kgositsile; Okonma	Tyler, the Creator	2:48
8.	"Centurion (Instrumental)" (featuring Vince Staples)	Kgositsile; T. Hassan; K. Hassan; Staples; Czukay; Schmidt; Liebezeit; Karoli; Axelrod	Christian Rich	3:04
9.	"523 (Instrumental)"	Kgositsile	randomblackdude	1:32
10.	"Uncle Al (Instrumental)"	Kgositsile	randomblackdude	0:53
11.	"Guild (Instrumental)" (featuring Mac Miller)	Kgositsile; McCormick	randomblackdude	3:54
12.	"Molasses (Instrumental)" (featuring RZA)	Kgositsile; Hibbert; Dodd	RZA; Christian Rich^{[a]}	2:16
13.	"Whoa (Instrumental)" (featuring Tyler, the Creator)	Kgositsile; Okonma	Tyler, the Creator	3:16
14.	"Hoarse (Instrumental)"	Kgositsile; Breaux	BadBadNotGood	3:52
15.	"Knight (Instrumental)" (featuring Domo Genesis)	Kgositsile; Cole; Willis; Douglas	Christian Rich	3:14
Total length:				44:07

Notes

- ^{^[a]} signifies a co-producer
- "Hoarse" features additional vocals from Frank Ocean

Sample credits

- "Centurion" contains samples of "Soup", written by Holger Czukay, Irmin Schmidt, Jaki Liebezeit and Michael Karoli, and performed by Can; and "A Divine Image", written and performed by David Axelrod.
- "Molasses" contains a sample of "Rose Len", performed by Lennie Hibbert.
- "Knight" contains a sample of "I've Changed", performed by The Magictones.

== Personnel ==
Album credits adapted from AllMusic.

- The Alchemist – engineer
- BadBadNotGood – mixing, producer
- Josh Berg – engineer, mixing
- Anita Marisa Boriboon – art direction, design
- Casey Veggies – featured artist
- Jason Dill – photography
- Jeff Ellis – engineer
- Sk La' Flare – featured artist
- Domo Genesis – featured artist
- Ron Gilmore – keyboards
- Trehy Harris – mixing assistant
- Chad Hugo – keyboards, trumpet
- Jaycen Joshua – mixing
- Ryan Kaul – mixing assistant
- Om'Mas Keith – engineer, instrumentation
- Dave Kutch – mastering
- Mike Larson – engineer
- Cesar Loza – assistant
- Malay Ho – engineer
- Matt Martians – producer
- Kunle Martins – illustrations
- Mac Miller – featured artist
- The Neptunes – producer
- Frank Ocean – featured artist, keyboards, producer, vocals
- Julian Prindle – engineer
- Christian Rich – producer
- RZA – featured artist, producer
- Samiyam – producer
- Vince Staples – featured artist, vocals
- Earl Sweatshirt – primary artist
- Tyler, the Creator – featured artist, producer
- Michael Uzowuru – instrumentation, producer
- Vic Wainstein – engineer

== Charts ==
=== Weekly charts ===
Chart performance for Doris
Chart (2013)	Peak position
Australian Albums (ARIA)	23
Belgian Albums (Ultratop Flanders)	63
Belgian Albums (Ultratop Wallonia)	142
Canadian Albums (Billboard)	4
Danish Albums (Hitlisten)	14
Irish Albums (IRMA)	44
New Zealand Albums (RMNZ)	34
Norwegian Albums (VG-lista)	24
Scottish Albums (Official Charts)	36
UK Albums (Official Charts)	23
UK R&B Albums (Official Charts)	1
US Billboard 200	5
US Top R&B/Hip-Hop Albums (Billboard)	2

=== Year-end charts ===
2013 year-end chart performance for Doris
Chart (2013)	Position
US Top R&B/Hip-Hop Albums	65

== Certifications ==
Certifications for Doris
Region	Certification	Certified units/sales
United States (RIAA)	Gold	500,000^{‡}
^{‡} Sales+streaming figures based on certification alone.
