= Tied Up (Casey Veggies song) =

Single by Casey Veggies featuring Dej Loaf

from the album Live & Grow
- Released: April 27, 2015
- Genre: Hip hop; R&B
- Length: 3:13
- Label: Vested in Culture; Epic
- Songwriters: Casey Jones; Deja Trimble; Daniel Johnson; Paris Jones; Vinay Vyas; Luca Polizzi
- Producers: Kane Beatz; Luca Polizzi

Casey Veggies singles chronology
"See Me" (2015)	"Tied Up" (2015)	"Baddies" (2015)

Dej Loaf singles chronology
"Ryda" (2015)	"Tied Up" (2015)	"Back Up" (2015)

"Tied Up" is a song recorded by American rapper Casey Veggies. It was released on April 27, 2015, as the second single from his debut studio album, Live & Grow (2015). The song produced by Kane Beatz and Luca Polizzi, features guest vocals from American rapper and singer Dej Loaf.

== Music video ==
The music video for "Tied Up", directed by Alex Nazari, premiered on June 9, 2015, via Veggies' Vevo channel.

== Charts ==
Chart (2015)	Peak position
US Bubbling Under R&B/Hip-Hop Singles (Billboard)	1

== Certifications ==
Region	Certification	Certified units/sales
United States (RIAA)	Gold	500,000^{‡}
^{‡} Sales+streaming figures based on certification alone.
