= Onitsha (musician) =

American singer

- Genres: Christian R&B, gospel, contemporary R&B, urban contemporary gospel, soul
- Occupations: Singer, songwriter
- Instruments: Vocals, singer-songwriter
- Years active: 2007–present
- Label: Stillwaters

Onitsha is an American gospel musician. Her first album, Church Girl, was released by Stillwaters Records in 2007. This album was a Billboard magazine breakthrough release on the Gospel Albums chart.

== Music career ==
Onitsha first came on the scene as a soloist with the Mississippi Children's Choir singing lead on "I'm Blessed" from When God's Children Get Together. Her solo music recording career commenced in 2007, with the album, Church Girl, and it was released on April 17, 2007, by Stillwaters Records. This album was her breakthrough release upon the Billboard magazine charts, and it placed at No. 19 on the Gospel Albums chart. The album was reviewed positively by AllMusic and GOSPELflava, in addition, it got a nine out of ten review from Cross Rhythms.

In 2015, Onitsha sang background vocal in Janet Jackson's Unbreakable World Tour.

== Discography ==
List of studio albums, with selected chart positions
Title	Album details	Peak chart positions
Title	Album details	US Gos
Church Girl	Released: April 17, 2007; Label: Stillwaters; CD, digital download	19
