= Customized Greatly Vol. 4: The Return of the Boy =

Mixtape by Casey Veggies
- Released: May 20, 2016
- Recorded: 2015–2016
- Genre: Hip hop
- Length: 46:20
- Label: Peas & Carrots; Roc Nation; Epic
- Producer: Casey Veggies (exec.); Rob Holladay; Mike Zombie; Megaman; Kacey Khaliel; Danny Wolf; Scoop DeVille; 2Fly; Childish Major; Matty P; D. Clax; Harry Fraud; Jake One; Hit-Boy

Casey Veggies chronology
Live & Grow (2015)	Customized Greatly Vol. 4: The Return of the Boy (2016)	B.A.T.W./C.U.I.T.G. (2019)

Customized Greatly Vol. 4: The Return of the Boy is the eighth mixtape by American rapper Casey Veggies. It was released on May 20, 2016 by Peas & Carrots International, Roc Nation and Epic Records. The mixtape contains guest appearances from Tory Lanez, Dom Kennedy, Chris Brown and Ty Dolla Sign, among others.

== Release and promotion ==
On May 10, 2016, Casey Veggies released a trailer for Customized Greatly Vol. 4: The Return of the Boy and the mixtape cover. On May 16, 2016, Casey released a music video of the song, "Choose Up". On May 19, 2016, Casey released the track listing for the mixtape, revealing guest appearances and production.

== Track listing ==
No.	Title	Writer(s)	Producer(s)	Length
1.	"New Jack City"	Casey Jones; Robert Holladay	Holladay	2:54
2.	"Street Fame"	Jones; William Coleman	Mike Zombie	3:09
3.	"Can't Get Enough" (featuring Tory Lanez)	Jones; Daystar Peterson; Orville McWhinney	Megaman	4:21
4.	"Feelings" (featuring Kacey Khaliel)	Jones; Khaliel	Khaliel	3:59
5.	"Choose Up"	Jones; Danyel Ahmed	Danny Wolf	2:53
6.	"On the West" (featuring Dom Kennedy)	Jones; Elijah Molina; Dominic Hunn	Scoop DeVille	4:49
7.	"One on One" (featuring Chris Brown)	Jones; Sevyn Streeter; Christopher Brown		5:19
8.	"All Night" (featuring Ty Dolla $ign)	Jones; Tyrone Griffin, Jr.; Lloyd Mizell	2Fly	3:35
9.	"When It Go Down"	Jones; Markus Randle	Childish Major	3:34
10.	"Committed"	Jones; Matthew Pearson; David Claxton	Matty P; D. Clax	3:54
11.	"Perfect Timing"	Jones; Rory Quigley	Harry Fraud	3:17
12.	"Fortress"	Jones; Jacob Dutton	Jake One	3:47
13.	"Take Me Where It's Love (Searching Pt. 2)"	Jones; Chauncey Hollis, Jr.	Hit-Boy	3:29
