= Live & Grow =

Studio album by Casey Veggies
- Released: September 25, 2015
- Recorded: 2013–2015
- Genre: Hip hop
- Length: 49:29
- Labels: Peas & Carrots; Vested in Culture; Epic
- Producers: DJ Mustard; FreshChuck; Hit-Boy; Iamsu!; Kane Beatz; Mike & Keys; Polyester; Soundz; S. Dot; THC; Tyler, the Creator

Casey Veggies chronology
| Fresh Veggies (2013) | Live & Grow (2015) | Customized Greatly Vol. 4: The Return of The Boy (2016) |

Singles from Live & Grow
- 1. "Backflip" Released: November 7, 2014; 2. "Tied Up" Released: April 27, 2015

Professional ratings
Review scores
| Source | Rating |
|---|---|
| AllMusic | 3/5 stars |
| HipHopDX | 3/5 |
| HotNewHipHop | 74% |
| Pitchfork | 5.7/10 |

Live & Grow is the debut studio album by American rapper Casey Veggies. It was released on September 25, 2015, by Epic Records, Vested in Culture, and his own label Peas & Carrots International.

== Singles ==
The album's first single, "Backflip" featuring YG and Iamsu!, was released on November 7, 2014. On January 14, 2015, the music video was released for "Backflip" featuring YG and Iamsu!. The album's second single, "Tied Up" featuring Dej Loaf, was released on April 27, 2015. On June 9, 2015, the music video was released for "Tied Up" featuring Dej Loaf.

== Track listing ==
| No. | Title | Producer(s) | Length |
|---|---|---|---|
| 1. | "I'm the King" | FreshChuck | 4:01 |
| 2. | "Set It Off" | THC | 2:47 |
| 3. | "Actin' Up" (featuring Dom Kennedy) | DJ Mustard | 3:59 |
| 4. | "Backflip" (featuring YG and Iamsu!) | Iamsu! | 4:19 |
| 5. | "New Face$" | Mike & Keys; Polyester | 4:03 |
| 6. | "Wonderful" (featuring Ty Dolla Sign) | Hit-Boy | 3:56 |
| 7. | "Tied Up" (featuring DeJ Loaf) | Kane Beatz | 3:13 |
| 8. | "A Little Time" | Soundz | 3:53 |
| 9. | "Life Song" (featuring BJ the Chicago Kid) | S. Dot | 3:26 |
| 10. | "Sincerely Casey" | Mike & Keys | 3:00 |
| 11. | "Aw Man" | THC | 4:37 |
| 12. | "RIP" (featuring Tyler, the Creator) | Tyler, the Creator | 2:37 |
| 13. | "I'm Blessed" | THC | 5:39 |

== Charts ==
| Chart (2015) | Peak position |
|---|---|
| US Billboard 200 | 93 |
| US Top R&B/Hip-Hop Albums (Billboard) | 15 |
