= Casey Veggies =

American rapper (born 1993)

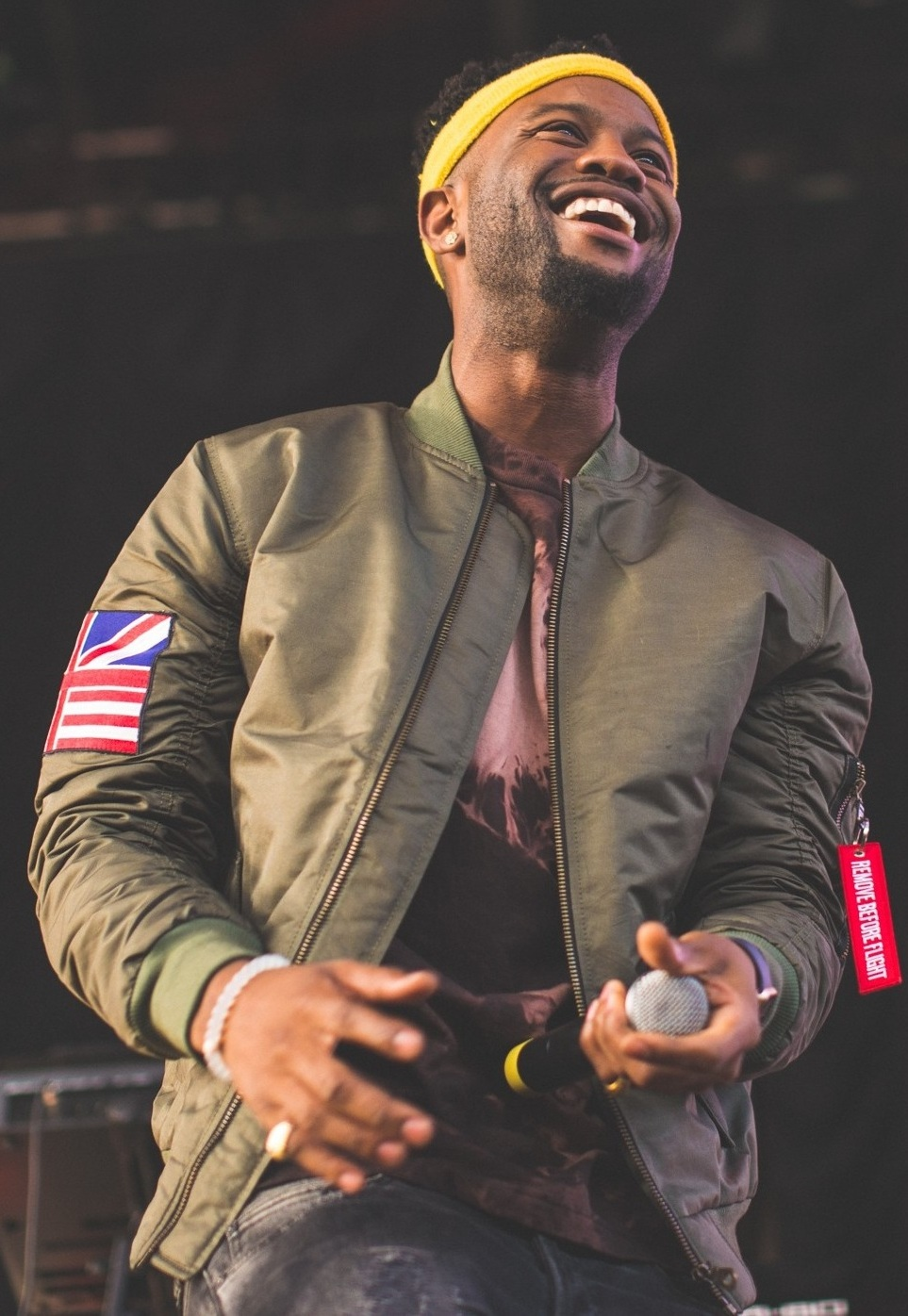
- Casey Veggies performing in July 2016

Background information
- Also known as: Custom; Young Veggies
- Born: Casey Joseph Jones; July 18, 1993 (age 33)
- Origin: Los Angeles, California, U.S.
- Genre: West Coast hip-hop
- Occupations: Rapper; songwriter
- Works: Casey Veggies discography
- Years active: 2007–present
- Labels: Peas & Carrots; Roc Nation; Epic; VIC
- Formerly of: Odd Future
- Website: www.caseyveggies.com

Casey Joseph Jones (born July 18, 1993), known professionally as Casey Veggies, is an American rapper. A founding member of the Los Angeles-based hip hop collective Odd Future, he co-formed the group with Tyler, the Creator, Hodgy, Left Brain, the Super 3 and Jasper Dolphin in 2007. He signed with Epic Records to release his debut studio album, Live & Grow (2015); its lead single, "Tied Up" (featuring Dej Loaf) received gold certification by the Recording Industry Association of America (RIAA). His second album, Organic (2019), followed thereafter.

== Career ==
=== 2007–2012: Career beginnings ===
At the age of 14, Casey released his first mixtape, titled Customized Greatly Vol. 1; while he was performing by his stage name at the time, Custom. Casey was one of the founding members of the hip hop collective Odd Future, appearing on the collective's first effort, The Odd Future Tape (2008), before deciding to branch out into his own solo career. In an interview with Respect Magazine, Casey state: "It’s hard to explain, really, but I just had more of a [different] vision for my own rap career. I wanted to do my own thing."

While working with a fellow rapper and Def Jam's recording artist YG on his second mixtape, Veggies began to take rap much more seriously. In an interview with The Madbury Club, Veggies discussed how "strategic sponsorships, limited merchandise, organic partnerships, social presence and influence ability have proved fundamental in the success of Peas & Carats and thus, Casey Veggies".

After graduating high school, Veggies joined with Mac Miller, as one of the opening acts for his Blue Slide Park Tour. Since then, Casey performed with artists, such as Nipsey Hussle, Dom Kennedy and Kendrick Lamar, as well as friends in OFWGKTA; including Tyler, the Creator, Hodgy Beats and Domo Genesis. Casey has also featured on records with artists, such as Rich Hil, King Chip and Raheem DeVaughn.

In April 2012, Veggies joined with Roc Nation artist Rita Ora for a sold-out performance at SOB's in NYC. In the same month, he also appeared with American rappers Mac Miller and Wiz Khalifa on MTV's RapFixLive.

=== 2013–2015: Life Changes and Live & Grow ===
On January 22, 2013, Veggies released a solo mixtape titled Life Changes. In February 2013, Veggies signed a record deal with VIC and Epic Records.

On the following day, the store opening of PNCINTL, Casey Veggies released a single, titled "Young Niggas" featuring Juicy J. On May 10, 2013, a new single, "Money Don't Buy Time" was released. Casey Veggies also appeared on the Earl Sweatshirt album Doris on the single "Hive"; along with Vince Staples. Casey Veggies released a mixtape with Rockie Fresh, titled Fresh Veggies in December 2013. It was presented by PUMA and was co-released under Maybach Music Group and PNCINTL. The mixtape features guest appearances from Overdoz, Ty Dolla Sign, Juicy J, Kirko Bangz and Hit-Boy; along with additional productions handled by Lunice, Jahlil Beats and Hit-Boy, among others. Casey Veggies has also appeared on The Neighbourhood's 2014 mixtape 000000 & #FFFFFF.

Casey went on his first Canadian tour under PNCINTL management in May 2015. Veggies' debut album, Live & Grow was released on September 25, 2015.

=== 2016–2019: Customized Greatly Vol. 4 and Organic ===
Casey Veggies began the rollout for the fourth mixtape in the Customized Greatly series. On May 16, 2016, he released the music video for the single "Choose Up". Later that same week, he teased the projects tracklist the day before release. Customized Greatly Vol. 4: The Return of the Boy was released on May 20, 2016.

In 2017, he was featured on the American rapper Wiz Khalifa's mixtape Laugh Now, Fly Later, as the only feature on the project.

After a few year long hiatus, Casey Veggies participated in an interview with MTV released on May 30, 2019. In this interview, he discussed his reasoning for leaving Epic Records, his reflections on Mac Miller after his death, and discussed his upcoming second studio album, Organic, to be released independently under his own label Peas & Carrots International (PNCINTL).

Organic was released on June 7, 2019, after a lead up of singles and music videos being released prior. The deluxe edition of the album, adding five new songs to the tracklist, was released later on November 22, 2019.

=== 2020–present: Fresh Veggies 2, CG5 and EPs ===
Casey Veggies would then go on to release various mixtapes and EPs. He released the sequel to his collaborative mixtape with Rockie Fresh, Fresh Veggies 2 on July 10, 2020. He also released two mixtapes, CG5 on February 26, 2021 and Crypto Veggies on July 22, 2022. CG5 is the fifth installment in the Customized Greatly series.

On April 29, 2022, Veggies dropped the EP Since Y'all Forgot. He released his second EP a year later on May 12, 2023, titled Ten Toes Down.

== Discography ==
Studio Albums

- Live & Grow (2015)
- Organic (2019)
