= Wale discography =

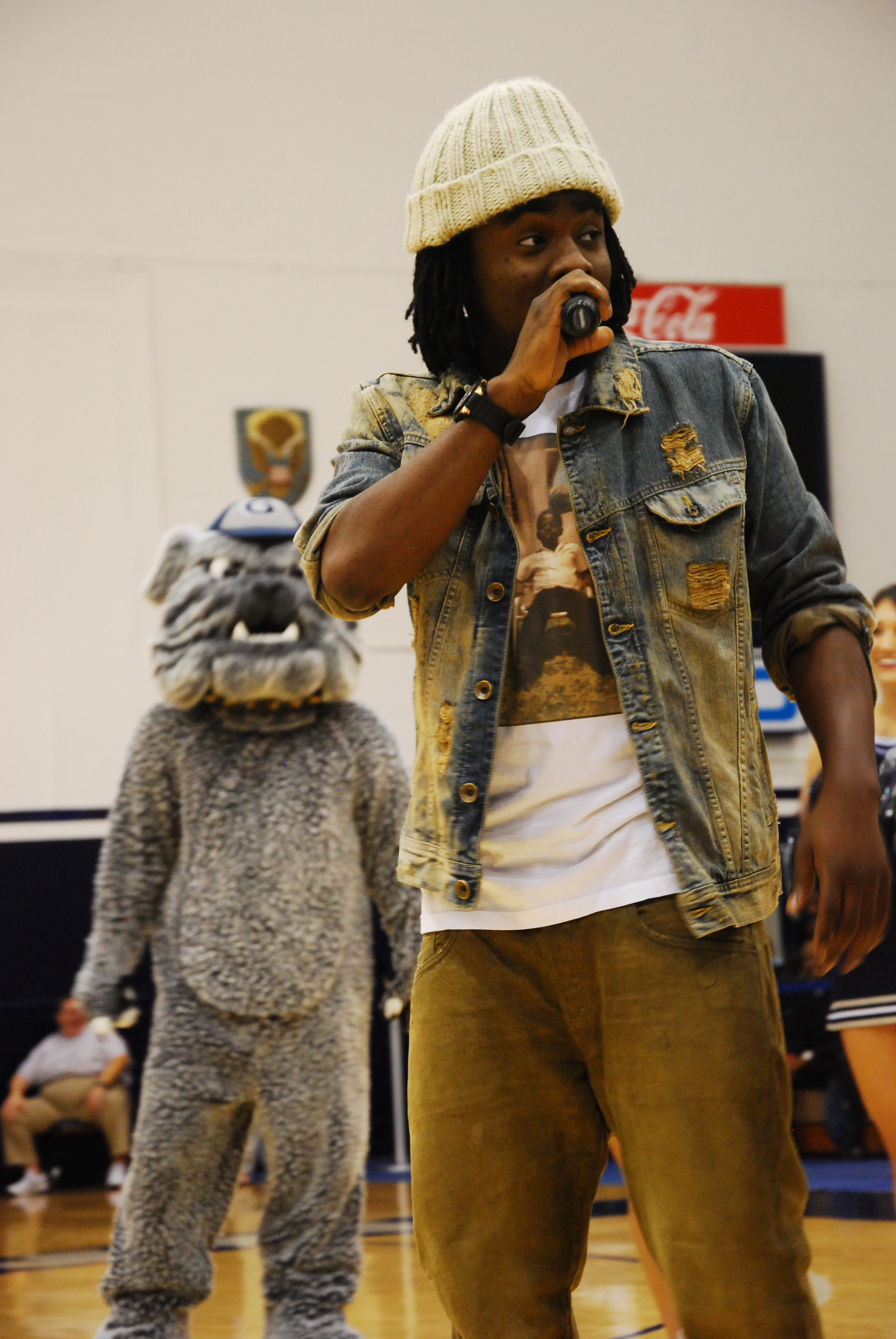
- Wale performing at Georgetown University in 2010
- Studio albums: 8
- Extended plays: 2
- Compilation albums: 2
- Singles: 65
- Music videos: 41
- Mixtapes: 11
- Promotional singles: 10

The discography of American rapper Wale consists of eight studio albums, three compilation albums, ten mixtapes, one extended play, sixty-five singles (including twenty-seven as a featured artist), two promotional singles and forty-one music videos. In 2005, Wale started his music career by releasing mixtapes in the Washington, D.C. area. His debut mixtape was titled Paint a Picture. Following that, Wale released his second mixtape in 2006, Hate Is the New Love. That same year, Wale signed with a local record label in Studio 43. In 2007, Wale was discovered by Mark Ronson and signed with his record label Allido Records, who released his third mixtape, 100 Miles & Running in July of that year.

In 2008, Allido and Wale entered a joint venture contract with Interscope Records, which released his fourth mixtape, The Mixtape About Nothing, which is Seinfeld-themed. In 2009, Wale also released his debut studio album, Attention Deficit, which contains three singles, "Chillin", featuring Lady Gaga, "Pretty Girls", featuring Gucci Mane, and Weensey, and "World Tour", featuring Jazmine Sullivan. After going on tour with Jay-Z in 2009, Wale became a managed artist of Jay-Z's recording label, Roc Nation, to help with all management duties. In that same year, he released his fifth mixtape, Back to the Feature. In 2010, he released his sixth (and second Seinfeld-themed) mixtape, More About Nothing under his own independent label, The Board Administration.

In 2011, Wale signed to Maybach Music Group where a compilation album named Self Made Vol. 1 was released. It topped R&B/Hip-Hop Albums, and Top Rap Albums, while peaking a number five on the Billboard 200 chart. Wale released his second studio album, Ambition, on November 1, 2011. It peaked at number two on the Billboard 200, and topped R&B/Hip-Hop Albums as well as Top Rap Albums.

== Albums ==
=== Studio albums ===
List of albums, with selected chart positions and sales figures
Title	Album details	Peak chart positions				Sales	Certifications
Title	Album details	US	US R&B	US Rap	CAN	Sales	Certifications
Attention Deficit	Released: November 10, 2009; Label: Allido, Interscope; Format: CD, LP, digital download	21	3	2	—	US: 200,000	
Ambition	Released: November 1, 2011; Label: Allido, Maybach, Warner Bros.; Format: CD, digital download	2	1	1	77	US: 482,000	RIAA: Platinum
The Gifted	Released: June 25, 2013; Label: Allido, Maybach, Atlantic; Format: CD, digital download	1	1	1	10	US: 367,000	RIAA: Gold
The Album About Nothing	Released: March 31, 2015; Label: Allido, Maybach, Atlantic; Format: CD, digital download, streaming	1	1	1	—	US: 138,000	RIAA: Gold
Shine	Released: April 28, 2017; Label: Every Blue Moon, Maybach, Atlantic; Format: CD, digital download, streaming	16	8	6	—		
Wow... That's Crazy	Released: October 11, 2019; Label: Every Blue Moon, Maybach, Warner; Format: CD, digital download, streaming	7	6	5	55		RIAA: Gold
Folarin II	Released: October 22, 2021; Label: Every Blue Moon, Maybach, Warner; Format: CD, digital download, streaming	22	12	11	—		
Everything Is a Lot	Released: November 14, 2025; Label: Def Jam; Format: digital download, streaming	19	5	3	—		
"—" denotes a recording that did not chart or was not released in that territory.

=== Collaborative albums ===
List of albums, with selected chart positions and sales figures
Title	Album details	Peak chart positions					Sales
Title	Album details	US	US R&B	US Rap	CAN	FRA	Sales
Self Made Vol. 1 (with Maybach Music Group)	Released: May 23, 2011; Label: Maybach, Warner Bros.; Format: CD, digital download	5	1	1	—	—	US: 230,000
Self Made Vol. 2 (with Maybach Music Group)	Released: June 26, 2012; Label: Maybach, Warner Bros.; Format: CD, digital download	4	1	1	37	—	US: 285,000
Self Made Vol. 3 (with Maybach Music Group)	Released: September 17, 2013; Label: Maybach, Atlantic; Format: CD, digital download	4	1	1	—	182	

== Extended plays ==
List of extended plays
Title	EP details	Peak chart positions
Title	EP details	US
It's Complicated	Released: March 13, 2018; Format: Digital download, streaming; Label: Every Blue Moon, Maybach	154
Self Promotion	Released: May 8, 2018; Format: Digital download, streaming; Label: Every Blue Moon, Maybach	—
Free Lunch	Released: September 14, 2018; Format: Digital download, streaming; Label: Warner	103
The Imperfect Storm	Released: June 18, 2020; Format: Digital download, streaming; Label: Warner	—

== Mixtapes ==
List of mixtapes
Title	Album details
Paint a Picture	Released: 2005; Format: CD; Label: Wale
Hate Is the New Love	Released: 2006; Format: CD; Label: Studio 43
100 Miles & Running	Released: November 9, 2007; Format: Digital download; Label: Wale
The Mixtape About Nothing	Released: May 30, 2008; Format: Digital download; Label: 10.Deep Clothing
Back to the Feature	Released: June 19, 2009; Format: Digital download; Label: Modulor
More About Nothing	Released: August 3, 2010; Format: Digital download
The Eleven One Eleven Theory	Released: August 17, 2011; Format: Digital download; Label: The Board Administration, Maybach
Folarin	Released: December 24, 2012; Format: Digital download; Label: Every Blue Moon, Maybach
Festivus (with A-Trak)	Released: December 23, 2014; Format: Digital download; Label: Every Blue Moon, Maybach
Summer on Sunset	Released: June 17, 2016; Format: Digital download; Label: Every Blue Moon, Maybach
Before I Shine	Released: March 15, 2017; Format: Digital download; Label: Every Blue Moon, Maybach

== Singles ==
=== As lead artist ===
List of singles as lead artist, with selected chart positions and certifications, showing year released and album name
Title	Year	Peak chart positions									Certifications	Album
Title	Year	US	US R&B	US Rap	AUS	BEL (FL)	CAN	FRA	IRE	UK	Certifications	Album
"Nike Boots"	2008	—	—	—	—	—	—	—	—	—		Non-album single
"Chillin" (featuring Lady Gaga)	2009	99	— (Note: "Chillin'" did not enter the Hot R&B/Hip-Hop Songs chart, but peaked at number 25 on the Bubbling Under R&B/Hip-Hop Singles chart.)	—	29	70	73	—	19	12		Attention Deficit
"World Tour" (featuring Jazmine Sullivan)	2009	—	—	—	—	—	—	—	—	—		Attention Deficit
"Pretty Girls" (featuring Gucci Mane and Weensey)	2009	—	56	—	—	—	—	—	—	—		Attention Deficit
"Bad Girls Club" (featuring J. Cole)	2011	—	—	—	—	—	—	—	—	—		Non-album single
"That Way" (featuring Jeremih and Rick Ross)	2011	49	4	5	—	—	—	—	—	—	RIAA: Platinum	Self Made Vol. 1 & Ambition
"Chain Music"	2011	—	—	—	—	—	—	—	—	—		Ambition
"Bait"	2011	—	— (Note: "Bait" did not enter the Hot R&B/Hip-Hop Songs chart, but peaked at number 2 on the Bubbling Under R&B/Hip-Hop Singles chart.)	—	—	—	—	—	—	—		Ambition
"Lotus Flower Bomb" (featuring Miguel)	2011	38	1	3	—	—	—	—	—	—	RIAA: 5× Platinum; MC: Gold; RMNZ: Platinum	Ambition
"Focused" (featuring Kid Cudi)	2011	97	—	—	—	—	—	—	—	—		Ambition
"Sabotage" (featuring Lloyd)	2012	— (Note: "Sabotage" did not enter the Billboard Hot 100, but peaked at number 7 on the Bubbling Under Hot 100 chart.)	16	16	—	—	—	—	—	—		Ambition
"Bag of Money" (featuring Rick Ross, Meek Mill and T-Pain)	2012	64	2	3	—	—	—	—	—	—	RIAA: Gold	Self Made Vol. 2
"Actin' Up" (with Meek Mill featuring French Montana)	2012	—	87	—	—	—	—	—	—	—		Self Made Vol. 2
"Bad" (featuring Tiara Thomas or Rihanna)	2013	21	5	3	—	—	—	141	—	112	RIAA: 6× Platinum; BPI: Silver; MC: Platinum; RMNZ: 2× Platinum	The Gifted
"LoveHate Thing" (featuring Sam Dew)	2013	89	30	23	—	—	—	—	97	—	RIAA: Platinum; ARIA: Gold; RMNZ: Gold	The Gifted
"Poor Decisions" (featuring Rick Ross and Lupe Fiasco)	2013	—	— (Note: "Poor Decisions" did not enter the Hot R&B/Hip-Hop Songs chart, but peaked at number 9 on the Bubbling Under R&B/Hip-Hop Singles chart.)	—	—	—	—	—	—	—		Self Made Vol. 3
"Clappers" (featuring Nicki Minaj and Juicy J)	2013	— (Note: "Clappers" did not enter the Billboard Hot 100, but peaked at number 8 on the Bubbling Under Hot 100 chart.)	37	—	—	—	—	—	—	—		The Gifted
"The Body" (featuring Jeremih)	2014	87	26	17	—	—	—	—	—	—	RIAA: Platinum	The Album About Nothing
"Ride Out" (with Kid Ink, Tyga, YG and Rich Homie Quan)	2015	70	22	14	44	114	48	51	—	70	RIAA: Gold; MC: Platinum	Furious 7: Original Motion Picture Soundtrack
"The Matrimony" (featuring Usher)	2015	70	17	13	—	—	—	—	—	—	RIAA: 2× Platinum	The Album About Nothing
"My PYT"	2016	54	16	11	—	—	—	—	—	—	RIAA: Platinum; MC: Gold; RMNZ: Gold	Shine
"One Reason (Flex)" (featuring Eric Bellinger)	2016	—	—	—	—	—	—	—	—	—		Non-album singles
"Make It Work" (with Meek Mill and Rick Ross)	2016	—	—	—	—	—	—	—	—			Non-album singles
"Live Forever" (with Anthony Hamilton)	2016	—	—	—	—	—	—	—	—	—		The Birth of a Nation Soundtrack
"Running Back" (featuring Lil Wayne)	2017	100	37	—	—	—	—	—	—	—	RIAA: Gold	Shine
"Fashion Week" (featuring G-Eazy)	2017	—	— (Note: "Fashion Week" did not enter the Hot R&B/Hip-Hop Songs chart, but peaked at number nine on the Bubbling Under R&B/Hip-Hop Singles chart.)	—	—	—	—	—	—	—		Shine
"Saint Laurent" (with DJ Sliink and Skrillex)	2017	—	—	—	—	—	—	—	—	—		Non-album singles
"Staying Power"	2018	—	—	—	—	—	—	—	—	—		Non-album singles
"Black Bonnie" (featuring Jacquees)	2018	—	—	—	—	—	—	—	—	—		Wow... That's Crazy
"Pole Dancer" (featuring Megan Thee Stallion)	2018	—	—	—	—	—	—	—	—	—	RIAA: Gold	Wow... That's Crazy
"Gemini (2 Sides)"	2019	—	—	—	—	—	—	—	—	—		Non-album single
"On Chill" (featuring Jeremih)	2019	22	13	11	—	—	—	—	—	—	RIAA: 4× Platinum; MC: Gold; RMNZ: Platinum	Wow... That's Crazy
"Love & Loyalty" (featuring Mannywellz)	2019	—	—	—	—	—	—	—	—	—		Wow... That's Crazy
"Love... (Her Fault)" (featuring Bryson Tiller)	2020	— (Note: "Love... (Her Fault)" did not enter the Billboard Hot 100, but peaked at number 25 on the Bubbling Under Hot 100 chart.)	—	—	—	—	—	—	—	—	RIAA: Platinum	Wow... That's Crazy
"Sue Me" (featuring Kelly Price)	2020	—	—	—	—	—	—	—	—	—		Wow... That's Crazy
"Losing Focus" (with THEY.)	2020	—	—	—	—	—	—	—	—	—		The Amanda Tape
"Flawed" (featuring Gunna)	2020	—	—	—	—	—	—	—	—	—		Non-album single
"Angles" (featuring Chris Brown)	2021	— (Note: "Angles" did not enter the Billboard Hot 100, but peaked at number six on the Bubbling Under Hot 100 chart.)	44	—	—	—	—	—	—	—		Folarin II
"Down South" (featuring Yella Beezy and Maxo Kream)	2021	—	—	—	—	—	—	—	—	—		Folarin II
"Poke It Out" (featuring J. Cole)	2021	73	21	12	—	—	—	—	—	—	RIAA: Gold	Folarin II
"Beauty & the Madness" (with Rexx Life Raj and Fireboy DML)	2022	—	—	—	—	—	—	—	—	—		Non-album singles
"Max Julien"	2023	—	—	—	—	—	—	—	—	—		Non-album singles
"Overthink" (with Elmiene)	2026	— (Note: "Overthink" did not enter the Billboard Hot 100, but peaked at number 20 on the Bubbling Under Hot 100 chart.)	29	22	—	—	—	—	—	—		Non-album singles
"—" denotes a recording that did not chart or was not released in that territory.

=== As featured artist ===
List of singles as featured artist, with selected chart positions and certifications, showing year released and album name
Title	Year	Peak chart positions								Certifications	Album
Title	Year	US	US R&B	US Rap	AUS	BEL (FL)	GER	SWI	UK	Certifications	Album
"Rising Up" (The Roots featuring Wale and Chrisette Michele)	2008	—	—	—	—	—	—	—	—		Rising Down
"Change" (Daniel Merriweather featuring Wale)	2009	—	—	—	41	66	13	6	8		Love & War
"Fragile" (Chrisette Michele featuring Wale)	2009	—	— (Note: "Fragile" did not enter the Hot R&B/Hip-Hop Songs chart, but peaked at number 1 on the Bubbling Under R&B/Hip-Hop Singles chart.)	—	—	—	—	—	—		Epiphany
"No Hands" (Waka Flocka Flame featuring Roscoe Dash and Wale)	2010	13	2	1	—	—	—	—	—	RIAA: Diamond; BPI: Silver; RMNZ: 2× Platinum	Flockaveli
"Pocahontas" (Shawty Lo featuring Twista and Wale)	2011	—	— (Note: "Pocahontas" did not enter the Hot R&B/Hip-Hop Songs chart, but peaked at number 19 on the Bubbling Under R&B/Hip-Hop Singles chart.)	—	—	—	—	—	—		Still Got Units
"What Yo Name Iz?" (remix) (Kirko Bangz featuring Wale, Big Sean and Bun B)	2011	—	—	—	—	—	—	—	—		Non-album single
"Where They Do That At?" (Sabi featuring Wale)	2012	—	—	—	—	—	—	—	—		Non-album single
"What It Look Like" (Currensy featuring Wale)	2012	—	— (Note: "What It Look Like" did not enter the Hot R&B/Hip-Hop Songs chart, but peaked at number 7 on the Bubbling Under R&B/Hip-Hop Singles char.)	—	—	—	—	—	—		The Stoned Immaculate
"In & Out" (Marcus Canty featuring Wale)	2012	—	56	—	—	—	—	—	—		This...Is Marcus Canty
"Diced Pineapples" (Rick Ross featuring Wale and Drake)	2012	71	16	14	—	—	—	—	—	RIAA: Platinum	God Forgives, I Don't
"Hold Up" (Cash Out featuring Wale)	2012	—	50	—	—	—	—	—	—		Patience
"Better Be Good" (RaVaughn featuring Wale)	2013	—	105	—	—	—	—	—	—		Non-album single
"Bad Ass" (Kid Ink featuring Meek Mill and Wale)	2013	90	27	—	—	—	—	—	—		Almost Home
"So Many Girls" (DJ Drama featuring Tyga, Wale and Roscoe Dash)	2013	90	30	—	—	—	—	—	—		Quality Street Music
"Bounce It" (Juicy J featuring Wale and Trey Songz)	2013	74	25	18	—	—	—	—	—	RIAA: Gold	Stay Trippy
"Work" (Iggy Azalea featuring Wale)	2013	—	—	—	—	—	—	—	—		Non-album single
"Last Night" (Sebastian Mikael featuring Wale)	2013	—	— (Note: "Last Night" did not enter the Hot R&B/Hip-Hop Songs chart, but peaked at number 5 on the Bubbling Under R&B/Hip-Hop Singles chart.)	—	—	—	—	—	—		Speechless
"Keep the Hustle" (A.R. Rahman featuring Wale)	2014	—	—	—	—	—	—	—	—		Million Dollar Arm
"Twerk It" (Project Pat featuring Wiz Khalifa, Ty Dolla Sign and Wale)	2015	—	—	—	—	—	—	—	—		Mista Don't Play 2: Everythangs Money
"Coffee" (Miguel featuring Wale)	2015	78	26	—	78	—	—	—	97	RIAA: Gold; BPI: Silver; RMNZ: Platinum	Wildheart
"Trap Trap Trap" (Rick Ross featuring Young Thug and Wale)	2017	97	— (Note: "Trap Trap Trap" did not enter the Billboard Hot R&B/Hip-Hop Songs chart, but peaked at number six on the Bubbling Under R&B/Hip-Hop Singles chart.)	—	—	—	—	—	—		Rather You Than Me
"Change" (RM featuring Wale)	2017	—	—	—	—	—	—	—	—		Non-album singles
"Spirit" (Kwesta featuring Wale)	2017	—	—	—	—	—	—	—	—		Non-album singles
"Fiscal Thoughts" (Smoke DZA featuring Wale & Phil Ade)	2018	—	—	—	—	—	—	—	—		A Closed Mouth Don't Get Fed
"Pour Me" (Elle Varner featuring Wale)	2019	—	—	—	—	—	—	—	—		Ellevation
"Let Me Drink" (Guy Sebastian and The HamilTones featuring Wale)	2019	—	—	—	— (Note: "Let Me Drink" did not enter the ARIA Singles Chart, but peaked at number 30 on the ARIA Digital Track Chart.)	—	—	—	—	ARIA: Gold	T.R.U.T.H.
"In My Bed" (Rotimi featuring Wale)	2020	— (Note: "In My Bed" did not enter the Billboard Hot 100, but peaked at number 20 on the Bubbling Under Hot 100 chart.)	—	—	—	—	—	—	—	RIAA: Platinum; BPI: Silver; RMNZ: Gold	The Beauty of Becoming
"U Remind Me" (The Bonfyre featuring Wale)	2020	—	—	—	—	—	—	—	—		Love, Lust & Let Downs: Chapter One
"Red Lights" (Rini featuring Wale)	2020	—	—	—	—	—	—	—	—		Constellations
"Not for Me" (Reason featuring Wale & Ade)	2020	—	—	—	—	—	—	—	—		Non-album single
"Options" (EarthGang featuring Wale)	2021	—	—	—	—	—	—	—	—		Ghetto Gods
"Single and Happy" (Kash Doll featuring Eric Bellinger & Wale)	2021	—	—	—	—	—	—	—	—		
"Cafe" (Stokely featuring Wale)	2022	—	—	—	—	—	—	—	—		Sankofa
"Blood on the Dance Floor" (Odumodublvck featuring Bloody Civilian and Wale)	2023	—	—	—	—	—	—	—	—		EZIOKWU
"—" denotes a recording that did not chart or was not released in that territory.

=== Promotional singles ===
Title	Year	Album
"Drop" (Wizkid featuring Wale)	2013	Non-album singles
"Nobody But You" (Wizkid featuring Wale)	2013	Non-album singles
"Feeling Right (Everything Is Nice)" (Matoma featuring Wale and Popcaan)	2015	Hakuna Matoma
"The Girls On Drugs"	2015	The Album About Nothing
"The Bloom (AG3)"	2016	The Album About Nothing
"Groundhog Day"	2016	Before I Shine
"Colombia Heights (Te Llamo)" (featuring J. Balvin)	2017	Shine
"Fine Girl" (featuring Davido and Olamide)	2017	Shine
"My Love" (featuring Major Lazer, WizKid and Dua Lipa)	2017	Shine

== Other charted songs ==
List of songs, with selected chart positions, showing year released and album name
Title	Year	Peak chart positions		Certifications	Album
Title	Year	US	US R&B	Certifications	Album
"Black and Purple" (Mullyman featuring Wale and Wiz Khalifa)	2011	—	98		WiRemix 5
"600 Benz" (featuring Rick Ross and Jadakiss)	2011	—	— (Note: "600 Benz" did not enter the Hot R&B/Hip-Hop Songs chart, but peaked at number 6 on the Bubbling Under R&B/Hip-Hop Singles chart.)		Self Made Vol. 1
"Play Your Part" (featuring Rick Ross, Meek Mill and D.A.)	2011	—	— (Note: "Play Your Part" did not enter the Hot R&B/Hip-Hop Songs chart, but peaked at number 12 on the Bubbling Under R&B/Hip-Hop Singles chart.)		Self Made Vol. 1
"Ambition" (featuring Meek Mill and Rick Ross)	2011	81	—	RIAA: Platinum; MC: Gold	Ambition
"Slight Work" (featuring Big Sean)	2011	—	63		Ambition
"Complicated" (LaTocha featuring Wale)	2012	—	— (Note: "Complicated" did not enter the Hot R&B/Hip-Hop Songs chart, but peaked at number 15 on the Bubbling Under R&B/Hip-Hop Singles chart.)		Truth 'N The Booth
"M.I.A." (Omarion featuring Wale)	2012	—	—		Self Made Vol. 2
"Lay Up" (Meek Mill featuring Wale, Rick Ross and Trey Songz)	2013	—	— (Note: "Lay Up" did not enter the Hot R&B/Hip-Hop Songs chart, but peaked at number 2 on the Bubbling Under R&B/Hip-Hop Singles chart.)		Dreams and Nightmares
"I'm Still" (DJ Khaled featuring Chris Brown, Wale, Wiz Khalifa and Ace Hood)	2013	—	— (Note: "I'm Still" did not enter the Hot R&B/Hip-Hop Songs chart, but peaked at number 4 on the Bubbling Under R&B/Hip-Hop Singles chart.)		Suffering from Success
"Don't Shoot" (The Game featuring Rick Ross, 2 Chainz, Diddy, Fabolous, Wale, DJ Khaled, Swizz Beatz, Yo Gotti, Currensy, Problem, King Pharaoh and TGT)	2014	—	—		Non-album song
"The Need to Know" (featuring SZA)	2015	—	—	RIAA: Platinum; RMNZ: Gold	The Album About Nothing
"Dearly Beloved" (featuring Jamie Foxx)	2021	—	52		Folarin II
"Michael Fredo"	2025	—	45		Everything Is a Lot
"Watching Us" (featuring Leon Thomas)	2025	76	14		Everything Is a Lot
"—" denotes a recording that did not chart.

== Guest appearances ==
List of non-single guest appearances, with other performing artists, showing year released and album name
Title	Year	Other artist(s)	Album
"Is There Any Love"	2009	Kid Cudi	Man on the Moon: The End of Day
"So Close, So Far"	2010	Statik Selektah, Bun B, Colin Munroe	100 Proof: The Hangover
"The Greatness"	2010	Raheem DeVaughn	The Love & War MasterPeace
"You Got It"	2010	J. Cole	Friday Night Lights
"Pretty Bitches"	2011	Gucci Mane	The Return of Mr. Zone 6
"Future"	2011	DJ Khaled, Ace Hood, Meek Mill, Big Sean, Vado	We the Best Forever
"All the Way Gone"	2011	Game, Mario	The R.E.D. Album
"Never See You Again"	2011	DJ Drama, Talia Coles	Third Power
"Into the Morning"	2011	Roscoe Dash	J.U.I.C.E.
"Marilyn Monroe" (Remix)	2011	Brianna Perry	Face Off
"Go Girl"	2012	Yo Gotti, Big K.R.I.T., Big Sean, Wiz Khalifa	Live from the Kitchen
"Irene"	2012	Mitchelle'l	Irene
"Kings & Queens"	2012	Tyga, Nas	Careless World: Rise of the Last King
"Rack City" (Remix)	2012	Tyga, Fabolous, Jeezy, Meek Mill, T.I.	none
"Take a Chance"	2012	Monica	New Life
"Paper Tags"	2012	Jadakiss, French Montana, Styles P	Consignment
"Turn Up"	2012	Jadakiss, Future	Consignment
"Take U Home"	2012	Meek Mill, Big Sean	Dreamchasers 2
"House Party" (Remix)	2012	Meek Mill, Mac Miller, Fabolous	Dreamchasers 2
"5 AM"	2012	Black Cobain, Tre	Cheers
"South Side"	2012	Shy Glizzy	Law
"Don't Pay 4 It"	2012	DJ Khaled, Tyga, Mack Maine, Kirko Bangz	Kiss the Ring
"Life Should Go On"	2012	Big Sean	Detroit
"All of Me"	2012	Lloyd	The Playboy Diaries Vol. 1
"Turnt"	2012	Waka Flocka Flame, Roscoe Dash	Salute Me or Shoot Me 4 (Banned from America)
"Trung (Let's Get Down)"	2012	Skrillex	none
"Disqualified"	2012	Yo Gotti	Cocaine Muzik 7: The World Is Yours
"Lay Up"	2012	Meek Mill, Rick Ross, Trey Songz	Dreams and Nightmares
"True"	2012	Freeway	Diamond In the Ruff
"Rich Hipster"	2012	Chrisette Michele	Audrey Hepburn: An Audiovisual Presentation
"Don't Go Over There"	2012	French Montana, Fat Joe	Mac & Cheese 3
"Thrilla In Manilla"	2012	French Montana, Tyga	Mac & Cheese 3
"Dance Move"	2012	French Montana, Fabolous	Mac & Cheese 3
"Beauty"	2012	Fabolous	The S.O.U.L. Tape 2
"Stripper"	2012	Game	none
"Represent"	2012	Lil Durk	none
"Awesome"	2013	Juelz Santana	God Will'n
"Ceelo"	2013	Future	F.B.G.: The Movie
"DC To tha Bay"	2013	Mistah F.A.B.	I Found My Backpack 3
"Fuck Ya Friend"	2013	Uncle Murda, French Montana	The First 48
"Ceelo"	2013	DJ Scream, Future, Ludacris	The Ratchet Superior
"Only You Can Tell It"	2013	Pusha T	Wrath of Caine
"Pass Around"	2013	Young Scooter, Gucci Mane	Juughouse
"Throw Hunnids"	2013	L.D.	Owls & Spaceships
"Quintana"	2013	Travis Scott	Owl Pharaoh
"Til The Sun Up"	2013	Funkmaster Flex	Who You Mad At? Me or Yourself?
"No Lackin"	2013	Funkmaster Flex, Lil Reese, Waka Flocka Flame	Who You Mad At? Me or Yourself?
"Waiting" (Remix)	2013	Adrian Marcel	none
"Freaks" (Remix)	2013	French Montana, Nicki Minaj, Rick Ross, Mavado, DJ Khaled	none
"Understand Me"	2013	Problem	The Separation
"Winter Schemes"	2013	J. Cole	none
"Dark Knights"	2013	Rapsody	She Got Game
"I.O.U." (Remix)	2013	Luke James	Made to Love
"What It Do"	2013	Kirko Bangz	Progression III
"Seasonal Love"	2013	Sean Kingston	Back 2 Life
"FDB" (Remix)	2013	Young Dro, B.o.B, Chief Keef	none
"Anything Goes"	2013	Audio Push	Come As You Are
"I'm Still"	2013	DJ Khaled, Ace Hood, Chris Brown, Wiz Khalifa	Suffering from Success
"Tipsy"	2013	Ice Prince, Morell	Fire of Zamani
"Respect That You Earn"	2013	Yo Gotti, Ne-Yo	I Am
"Bennie and the Jets"	2014	Elton John, Miguel	Goodbye Yellow Brick Road (40th Anniversary Celebration)
"You Don't Know What to Do"	2014	Mariah Carey	Me. I Am Mariah... The Elusive Chanteuse
"Not Your Man" (Remix)	2014	Professor Green, Thabo	none
"Used To It"	2014	Gucci Mane	Gucci Vs. Guwop
"Thirsty" (Remix)	2014	PARTYNEXTDOOR	none
"Murder"	2014	Wizkid	Ayo
"On Demand"	2014	Keyshia Cole	Point of No Return
"It's Yo Shit"	2015	Chris Brown, Tyga	Fan of a Fan: The Album
"Like A Drum"	2015	Jamie Foxx	Hollywood: A Story of a Dozen Roses
"BRRRR"	2015	Fat Trel, Rick Ross	Georgetown
"Marvin Gaye" (Remix)	2015	Charlie Puth	none
"Beautiful Lie"	2015	Rick Ross	Black Dollar
"All I Need"	2015	Chris Brown	Before the Party
"You Don't Know"	2016	Tank	Sex Love Pain 2
"Afford My Love"	2016	Dreezy	No Hard Feelings
"Forgive Me Father"	2016	DJ Khaled, Meghan Trainor, Wiz Khalifa	Major Key
"What Now"	2016	Chocolate Droppa, BJ The Chicago Kid, Chaz French	Kevin Hart: What Now? (The Mixtape Presents Chocolate Droppa)
"live Forever"	2016	Anthony Hamilton	The Birth of a Nation: The Inspired By Album
"Show Off"	2016	Pete Rock, Smoke DZA	Don't Smoke Rock
"Fakin"	2017	Hoodie Allen	The Hype
"If I Told You That I Love You"	2017	Steve Aoki	Kolony
"Get Down"	2017	Statik Selektah, Phil Ade	8
"Voilà"	2017	N.E.R.D, Gucci Mane	No One Ever Really Dies
"Cee Cee From DC"	2017	T-Pain	Oblivion
"Summatime"	2017	Goldlink	At What Cost
"Way Up"	2017	Stokley	Introducing Stokley
"Too Much"	2018	YFN Lucci	Ray Ray from Summertime
"G.O.A.T. 2.0"	2018	Eric Bellinger	Eazy Call
"Tear Drops"	2018	Roscoe Dash	5thy5ive
"This My Summer"	2018	Fiend	Still Cookin'
"OMG"	2018	IDK	IDK & Friends :)
"100 Miles and Running"	2018	Logic, John Lindahl	YSIV
"Something Real"	2019	Adé, GoldLink	Always Something
"Act a Fool"	2019	Rick Ross	Port of Miami 2
"Your Side, My Side"	2019	Lightshow	If These Walls Could Talk 2
"Champagne"	2019	Eric Bellinger, Guapdad 4000	Saved by the Bellinger
"Hallelujah"	2019	Buddy, A$AP Ferg	Godfather of Harlem
"Private Jet"	2019	J. Stone	The Definition of Loyalty
"Trill Love"	2020	K Camp, Joe Trufant	Kiss 5
"French Toast"	2020	Westside Gunn, Joyce Wrice	Pray for Paris
"Walking Accomplishment"	2020	Casey Veggies	Fresh Veggies 2
"Guard Your Heart"	2020	Big Sean, Anderson .Paak, Earlly Mac	Detroit 2
"Losing Focus"	2020	They	Non-album single
"Don't Play Fair"	2020	Mozzy, Blxst	Occupational Hazard
"Note to Self"	2021	Russ, Big Sean, Joey Badass	Chomp 2
"Warm Words in a Cold World"	2021	Rick Ross, Future	Richer Than I Ever Been
"So Lonely"	2022	PJ Morton	Watch the Sun
"Beauty in the Madness"	2023	Rexx Life Raj	The Blue Hour
"Fine Lines"	2023	Rick Ross, Meek Mill, The-Dream	Too Good To Be True
"Stories in Motion"	2023	6lack	Since I Have a Lover
"Heavy on My Mind"	2024	Andra Day	Cassandra

== Music videos ==
=== As lead artist ===
List of music videos, with directors, showing year released
Title	Year	Director(s)
"Uptown Roamers"	2006	Charles Harris
"W.A.L.E.D.A.N.C.E."	2008	Todd Angkasuwan
"The Artistic Integrity"	2008	Rik Cordero
"Nike Boots"	2008	Chris Robinson
"Chillin'" (featuring Lady Gaga)	2009	Chris Robinson
"Family Affair"	2009	Rik Cordero
"Pat Your Weave"	2009	Rik Cordero
"My Sweetie"	2010	Tabi Bonney
"Pretty Girls" (featuring Gucci Mane and Weensey)	2010	Chris Robinson
"Diary"	2010	Rik Cordero
"The MC"	2011	DJ Omega
"The Break Up Song"	2011	DJ Omega
"That Way" (featuring Jeremih and Rick Ross)	2011	Dayo
"Bait"	2011	Dre Films
"Lotus Flower Bomb" (featuring Miguel)	2011	Taj
"Bad Girls Club" (featuring J. Cole)	2011	Rock Jacobs
"Chain Music"	2011	Rik Cordero
"Slight Work" (featuring Big Sean)	2012	Chris Brown
"Ambition" (featuring Meek Mill and Rick Ross)	2012	Dre Films
"Sabotage" (featuring Lloyd)	2012	K. Asher Levin
"Bag of Money" (featuring Rick Ross, Meek Mill and T-Pain)	2012	Colin Tilley
"Power Circle" (with Gunplay, Meek Mill and Stalley featuring Rick Ross and Kendrick Lamar)	2012	Dre Films
"Actin' Up" (with Meek Mill featuring French Montana)	2012	Mr. Boomtown
"Never Never"	2013	1st Impressions
"Let a Nigga Know" (featuring Chinx Drugz and Fatz)	2013	Dre Films
"Street Runner"	2013	Jon J
"The Show" (featuring Rick Ross and Aaron Wess)	2013	Dre Films
"Bad" (featuring Tiara Thomas)	2013	Alexandre Moors
"LoveHate Thing" (featuring Sam Dew)	2013	Sarah McColgan
"Clappers" (featuring Nicki Minaj and Juicy J)	2013	Benny Boom
"Golden Salvation (Jesus Piece)"	2013	Coodie Simmons, Chike
"Heaven's Afternoon" (featuring Meek Mill)	2013	Jon J
"The Body" (featuring Jeremih)	2015	none
"MMG Under God (Heavenly People)"	2015	none
"Ride Out" (with Kid Ink, Tyga, YG and Rich Homie Quan)	2015	Payne Lindsey
"The Girls On Drugs"	2015	Dre Films
"The Matrimony" (featuring Usher)	2015	Sarah McColgan
"The Bloom" (featuring Stokley Williams)	2016	EBM Films
"My PYT" (featuring Sam Sneak)	2016	Colin Tilley
"Groundhog Day"	2016	Wale
"Running Back" (featuring Lil Wayne)	2017	Armen Soudjian
"Fashion Week" (featuring G-Eazy)	2017	Romain Cieutat
"Colombia Heights (Te Llamo)" (featuring J Balvin)	2017	Mike Ho
"Fine Girl" (featuring Davido and Olamide)	2017	Patrick Ellis
"My Love" (featuring Major Lazer, Wizkid and Dua Lipa)	2017	ACRS
"Staying Power"	2018	Chris Hernandez
"Black Bonnie" (featuring Jacquees)	2018	Yasha Gruben
"Pole Dancer" (featuring Megan Thee Stallion)	2018	Lvtrkevin
"On Chill" (featuring Jeremih)	2019	Daniel CZ
"BGM"	2019	Jon J.
"Love... (Her Fault)" (featuring Bryson Tiller)	2020	Spike Tey

=== Other appearances ===
List of appearances in other artists' music videos
Artists	Title	Year	Role	Director(s)
Mark Ronson featuring Amy Winehouse	"Valerie"	2007	Himself (cameo)	Robert Hales
