= The Gifted (album) =

Studio album by Wale
- Released: June 25, 2013
- Recorded: 2011–13
- Genre: Hip-hop
- Length: 70:02
- Labels: Allido; Maybach; Atlantic
- Producers: Rick Ross (exec.); Wale (also exec.); Kane Beatz; Sean C & LV; Tone P; Stokley Williams; Sam Dew; Lionel Gray; No Credit; Lee Major; The Runners; Cardiak; Mark Henry; Juicy J; Drumma Boy; MexManny; Deputy; Jesse "Corporal" Wilson; Travi$ Scott; Just Blaze; Kelson Camp; Tiara Thomas; Cheeze Beatz; The MeKanics; Jake One; League of Starz

Wale chronology
Ambition (2011)	The Gifted (2013)	The Album About Nothing (2015)

Singles from The Gifted
- 1. "Bad" Released: February 5, 2013; 2. "LoveHate Thing" Released: May 21, 2013; 3. "Bad (Remix)" Released: June 3, 2013; 4. "Clappers" Released: September 3, 2013

The Gifted is the third studio album by American rapper Wale. The album was released on June 25, 2013 by Allido Records, Maybach Music Group and Atlantic Records. The production on the album was handled by multiple producers including Just Blaze, Jake One, Kane Beatz, Cardiak, The Runners and Lee Major among others. The album also features guest appearances from Meek Mill, Nicki Minaj, Rihanna, Ne-Yo, Rick Ross, Wiz Khalifa and 2 Chainz among others.

The Gifted was supported by four official singles— "Bad", "LoveHate Thing", "Bad (Remix)" and "Clappers". The album received generally positive reviews from music critics and was a commercial success. It debuted at number one on the US Billboard 200 chart, selling 158,000 copies in its first week. In June 2016, the album was certified gold by the Recording Industry Association of America (RIAA).

== Background ==
On November 25, 2011, shortly after the release of Ambition, Wale announced on Twitter that he had already begun working on his third album. In November 2012, during an interview with MTV, Wale explained he would be taking a new approach with his third studio album, saying:

"I just wanna show range. I proved a lot to my peers and to myself and to my fans so I just wanna take it back to something a little more exciting. When the music was most exciting to me. Kinda like when I was in my best pocket…Just for being swarmed in my own stuff and doing Self Made and all those things. I haven’t had an opportunity to stand on my own sonically as an artist as much as I would like. This new project I’m working on is definitely allowing me to do that."

He also explained that he would be taking his time on the album, saying: "It’s not coming as quick as like a lot of other projects. Self Made I could just hit a beat, but now I’m like ‘Alright, I don’t like the strings. Take that out. Let’s try this. I don’t like the percussion so let’s change the snare.’ I might be doing it myself on some of the songs on there so it's a little bit different." In March 2013, when speaking of his third studio album Wale said, "I'm dropping my third solo album first, then a couple months after I'll probably drop the Nothing project. I'm very creative, I'm knee deep in that joint. It's kind of like a persona; thing; I design my records and the sound a certain way for two different projects. It's going to have one sound, very, very soulful" and the first single, "Bad" is a pretty good indication of the direction I'm going for this project."

On March 20, 2013, during an interview with MTV, Wale explained why he is tired of talking about music and said that he is ready to let his music speak for itself, saying: "I'm not even gonna do all that other stuff. I'ma talk with the music. Until my album drop, until June 25, I'ma talk loud with the music, I've done everything I could do, I've said everything I could say. I've kissed the babies, I've shook the hands now let's let the music talk because I ain't about to come here and tell y'all exactly how I feel no more. I'ma let it all sing in the music." The album cover was released on May 15, 2013. Wale along with famed Mr. Cartoon designed the cover. On May 21, 2013, the album was made available for pre order on iTunes revealing a track listing without any guest appearances. On May 31, 2013, the final track listing was released revealing guest appearances on the album from Meek Mill, CeeLo Green, Yo Gotti, Lyfe Jennings, Nicki Minaj, Juicy J, Rihanna, Ne-Yo, Rick Ross, Wiz Khalifa, 2 Chainz, Jerry Seinfeld and Tiara Thomas. In June 2013, during an interview with The Washington Post, he explained the inspiration behind the album, saying "This album kind of wrote itself, in a way. I just used my inspiration. I would use Marvin Gaye's music to inspire "LoveHate Thing". I would use Michael Jackson to inspire "Tired of Dreaming." I would use Michael Jordan's career to inspire "88"."

== Release and promotion ==
On December 24, 2012, Wale released a mixtape titled Folarin in promotion of the album. It featured 21 tracks and guest appearances from Rick Ross, 2 Chainz, Scarface, Nipsey Hussle, Trinidad James, Hit-Boy, French Montana, Jhené Aiko and Chrisette Michele among others.

On March 20, 2013, he announced that the album would be titled The Gifted and would be released on June 25, 2013. On April 28, 2013, Wale released the first of a series of vlogs leading up to the release of the album.

== Singles ==
On February 5, 2013, the first single "Bad" featuring Tiara Thomas was released. The song was originally released on December 24, 2012, on Wale's mixtape Folarin. The music video for "Bad" was directed by Alexandre Moors and premiered on March 20, 2013. "Bad" had peaked at number 21 on the US Billboard Hot 100, making it Wale's second top 40 entry after "Lotus Flower Bomb", and becoming his highest-charting single as a lead artist.

On May 21, 2013, the second single "LoveHate Thing" featuring Sam Dew was released. On June 23, 2013, the music video for "LoveHate Thing" featuring Sam Dew was released.

The remix to "Bad" featuring Rihanna was released to iTunes as the album's third single on June 3, 2013. In late September 2013, "Clappers" was serviced to urban contemporary radio as the album's fourth single. On September 3, 2013, the music video was released for "Clappers" featuring Nicki Minaj and Juicy J. On September 30, 2013, the music video was released for "Golden Salvation (Jesus Piece)". On December 24, 2013, the music video was released for "Heaven's Afternoon" featuring Meek Mill.

== Critical reception ==
Professional ratings
Review scores
Source	Rating
AllMusic	4/5 stars
The A.V. Club	C
Consequence of Sound	3/5 stars
Exclaim!	6/10
Now	2/5 Ns
Pitchfork	5.1/10.0
PopMatters	8/10
Slant Magazine	3/5 stars
Spin	6/10
XXL	(XL)

The Gifted was met with positive reviews from music critics. At Metacritic, which assigns a weighted mean rating out of 100 to reviews from mainstream critics, the album received an average score of 65, based on 15 reviews, which indicates "generally favorable reviews". David Jeffries of AllMusic gave the album four out of five stars, saying "Besides being solidly built and not overstuffed at 16 tracks long, The Gifted is the fascinating sound of the life of the party growing up, and that's as in "in the process," because there are still plenty of club bangers, strip-club jams, and irresponsible moments, and all of them are welcome." Eric Diep of XXL gave the album an XL, saying "Matching his lyrical abilities with polished production and radio-ready hooks, The Gifted sees Wale inching towards hip-hop’s upper echelon, while still exhibiting the hunger of a young MC on the rise. “Born to lose, built to win,” he claims on “Heaven’s Afternoon.” Started from that bottom, but now he's got it." Jesse Cataldo of Slant Magazine gave the album three out of five stars, saying "When he plays to his strengths on The Gifted, the results are impressive, but more mass-market tracks leave him sounding unoriginal and anonymous." Miles Raymer of Pitchfork gave the album a 5.1 out of ten, saying "What seems to be the main purpose of the record is to elevate Wale beyond the level of Rick Ross’ reliable second-stringer, a guy who's capable of dropping the occasional strip club anthem in between a steady string of unremarkable features on pop songs. “Clappers” proves that when he embraces that job he's actually really good at it. But if he wants to be taken as a serious artist like the ones he spends most of the record emulating, he's going to have to start taking some real chances and get real far out of the box, out to place where people are known to wear kilts."

Brent Faulkner of PopMatters gave the album an eight out of ten, saying "All in all, Wale truly is ‘gifted’. Three albums in, Wale continues to impress with this prodigious rhymes and the ability assemble an album that is both consistent, intellectually stimulating, and enjoyable. Hey, he even makes a booty anthem like “Clapper” sound more refined than it really should be, regardless whether his partners in crime raunch it up. With no big time faux pas to be found, The Gifted is an extraordinary ‘gift’ to any hip-hop collection." Evan Rytlewski of The A.V. Club gave the album a C, saying "The Gifted, however, marks Wale's true moment of no return. Whatever survived of the brain behind Mixtape About Nothing has been permanently atrophied by luxury and laziness." Bruce Smith of HipHopDX gave the album four out of five stars, saying "Overall, The Gifted is a good album. Wale presents substance without being overly preachy, and still takes it back to the Go-Go for those who have been following him since Paint A Picture. While not without its flaws (the “Bad” remix was unnecessary, and probably done simply for the big name feature), those questioning the direction Wale was going post MMG affiliation will more than likely be pleased with The Gifted."

Jeff Weiss of Spin gave the album a six out of ten, saying "There's something about The Gifted that you can't dismiss. Wale has lost many of the qualities that made people like him in the first place, but he's refined the elements that he's managed to retain. He'll never pen another song as poignant as "The Kramer," but back then, he also couldn't write anything as well-crafted as "Bad." He's still the type of guy who wears too much cologne, but at least he's figured out the scent that works best for him." Max Mertens of Now gave the album two out of five stars, saying "A guest verse by 2 Chainz and a brief cameo by none other than Mr. Puffy Shirt himself, Jerry Seinfeld, aren’t enough to keep anybody except Wale diehards from yada yada-ing through this one." Kevin Jones of Exclaim! gave the album a six out of ten, saying "On The Gifted, the DC native attempts to wheel it back a little bit and slip into something with greater depth than his recent offerings, not only showing more focus in his rhymes, but couching them in a more vibrant sound bed of live instrumentation and retro samples. Cuts like "Sunshine," the Dap Kings-featuring "Gullible" and "Vanity" best demonstrate this revamped pose, albeit with mixed results, particularly in the execution of that latter track. However, it's the portions of the record squarely focused at the MMG set that are more miss than hit."

== Commercial performance ==
The Gifted debuted at number one on the US Billboard 200 chart, selling 158,000 copies in its first week. This became Wale's first US number one debut and his second top-ten album. In its second week, the album dropped to number two on the chart, selling an additional 50,000 copies. In its third week, the album dropped to number seven on the chart, selling 28,000 more copies. In its fourth week, the album dropped to number 15 on the chart, selling 18,000 copies. As of March 2015, the album has sold 367,000 copies in the United States. On June 14, 2016, the album was certified gold by the Recording Industry Association of America (RIAA) for combined sales and album-equivalent units of over 500,000 units.

== Track listing ==
No.	Title	Writer(s)	Producer(s)	Length
1.	"The Curse of the Gifted"	Olubowale Akintimehin; Deleno Matthews; Levar Coppin	Sean C & LV	4:31
2.	"LoveHate Thing" (featuring Sam Dew)	Akintimehin; Antonio Palmer; Stokley Williams; Sam Dew	Tone P; Stokley Williams; Sam Dew	4:27
3.	"Sunshine"	Akintimehin; Palmer; Williams; Dew	Tone P; Williams	3:44
4.	"Heaven's Afternoon" (featuring Meek Mill)	Akintimehin; Robert Williams; Lionel Gray; Williams; Dew; Kevin Spencer	Gray; No Credit; Williams; Dew	4:41
5.	"Golden Salvation (Jesus Piece)"	Akintimehin; Leigh Elliott	Lee Major	3:40
6.	"Vanity"	Akintimehin; Spencer	No Credit	4:38
7.	"Gullible" (featuring Cee Lo Green)	Akintimehin; Thomas Callaway; Williams; Dew; Spencer	Williams; No Credit	4:42
8.	"Bricks" (featuring Yo Gotti & Lyfe Jennings)	Akintimehin; Mario Mimms; Chester Jennings; Carl McCormick; Spencer; Dew	Cardiak; No Credit	4:42
9.	"Clappers" (featuring Nicki Minaj & Juicy J)	Akintimehin; Daniel Johnson; Onika Maraj; Jordan Houston; M. Henry; Spencer	Mark Henry Beats; No Credit; Juicy J	5:16
10.	"Bad (Remix)" (featuring Rihanna)	Akintimehin; Robyn Fenty; Emmanuel Zaragoza	MexManny	3:58
11.	"Tired of Dreaming" (featuring Ne-Yo & Rick Ross)	Akintimehin; Shaffer Smith; William Roberts; Jamil Pierre; Jesse Wilson	Deputy; Jesse "Corporal" Wilson	3:54
12.	"Rotation" (featuring Wiz Khalifa & 2 Chainz)	Akintimehin; Cameron Thomaz; Tauheed Epps; Jacques Webster; Alex Lipinski	Travi$ Scott; AdoTheGod	5:00
13.	"Simple Man"	Akintimehin; Spencer	No Credit; Ralph Folarin	3:12
14.	"88"	Akintimehin; Palmer; Justin Smith	Just Blaze; Tone P	4:42
15.	"Black Heroes / Outro About Nothing" (featuring Jerry Seinfeld)	Akintimehin; Elliott; Dew; Williams; Jerry Seinfeld	Lee Major; Dew; Stokley Williams	4:40
16.	"Bad" (featuring Tiara Thomas)	Akintimehin; Tiara Thomas; Kelson Camp	Camp; Thomas	4:15
Total length:				70:02

Target bonus disc
No.	Title	Writer(s)	Producer(s)	Length
17.	"Back 2 Ballin" (featuring French Montana)	Akintimehin; Karim Kharbouch; C. Gholson; Darryl McCorkell	Cheeze Beatz; Drumma Boy	3:22
18.	"MFS" (featuring Fat Trel)	Akintimehin; Martrel Reeves; Michael Hernandez; Richard Duran	The MeKanics	4:55
19.	"Hella" (featuring Dom Kennedy & YG)	Akintimehin; Dominic Hunn; Keenan Jackson; Jacob Dutton	The Runners; Jake One	4:21
20.	"One Eye Kitten (Remix)" (featuring Webbie, Problem & Black Cobain)	Akintimehin; Webster Gradney; Jason Martin; Marcus Gloster	League of Starz	4:00

Samples

- "Vanity" contains an interpolation of "Mad World" by Gary Jules.

== Personnel ==
Credits adapted from AllMusic.

- 2 Chainz – featured artist
- Adothegod – drums, keyboards, producer, programming
- Shajuan Andrews – drums
- Chris Athens – mastering
- Marce Ayala – assistant engineer
- Ben Baptie – mixing assistant
- Sam Bohl – assistant engineer, mixing assistant
- Karla Brown – choir/chorus
- Sean C – producer
- Kelson Camp – drums, keyboards, producer, programming
- Cardiak – producer
- Jiwoong Cheh – sculpture
- Ariel Chobaz – vocal engineer
- Michael Congdon – engineer
- Josh Connolly – vocal engineer
- Eric Curry – timbales
- Deputy – producer
- Sam Dew – featured artist, keyboards, piano, producer, vocals, background vocals
- Dave Edgar – cello
- Tom Elmhirst – mixing
- Trevor Flandris – bass
- Ralph Folarin – producer
- Wale Folarin – executive producer
- Cochemea Gastelum – horn
- Lionel Gray – producer, background vocals
- Cee Lo Green – featured artist
- Daniel Groover – guitar
- David Guy – horn
- Joe "Thelonius" Harley – keyboards
- Mark Henry – producer
- Michael "Tecknics" Hernandez – vocal engineer
- Chris Hunt – drums, tambourine
- Lyfe Jennings – featured artist
- Walker Johnson – vocals
- Juicy J – featured artist, producer
- Just Blaze – mixing, producer
- Gloria Kaba – assistant engineer
- Kane Beatz – producer
- Anthony Kilhoffer – keyboards, vocals
- Jordan Kinne – assistant
- Christina Kirkland – choir/chorus
- Michael Kuzoian – assistant engineer
- Alexa Lima – piano
- David Linaburg – guitar
- Alexander Mathew Lipinski – producer
- Craig Love – bass
- LV – producer
- Magazeen Choir – choir/chorus
- Lee Major – producer
- Fabian Marasciullo – mixing
- Andrea Martin – vocals
- Dallas Martin – A&R
- Meek Mill – featured artist
- William Miller – sample source
- Nicki Minaj – featured artist
- Lauren Morris – choir/chorus
- Ne-Yo – featured artist
- Alec Newell – engineer
- Gloria Nissenson – sample source
- No Credit – engineer, mixing, producer
- Jeremiah Olvera – mixing assistant
- Roland Orzabal – sample source
- Derek Pacuk – engineer
- Shannon Peters – choir/chorus
- Neal H. Pogue – mixing
- Patrick Postle – bass
- Rich Rich – assistant
- Rihanna – featured artist
- Daniela Rivera – assistant engineer
- Andrew Robertson – assistant engineer
- Marco Robinson – guitar
- Kyle Ross – engineer
- Rick Ross – executive producer, featured artist
- Hod David Schudson – sample source
- Cody Sciara – assistant, assistant engineer
- Travis Scott – drums, keyboards, producer
- Jerry Seinfeld – featured artist
- Derek Selby – engineer
- Terrence "Scar" Smith – background vocals
- Mark Stevens – sample source
- Stokley – bass, drum programming, drums, guitar, keyboards, percussion, producer, vocals, background vocals
- Neal Sugarman – horn
- Phil Tan – mixing
- Tiara Thomas – arranger, featured artist, producer, strings
- Tone P – additional production, bongos, percussion, producer, programming
- Pat Viala – mixing
- Wale – primary artist
- Jamal Webb – choir/chorus
- Finis "KY" White – vocal engineer, vocal mixing
- Jesse "Corporal" Wilson – producer
- Wiz Khalifa – featured artist
- Stevie Wonder – sample source
- Andrew Wright – engineer, mixing
- Yo Gotti – featured artist
- Emmanuel Zaragoza – producer
- Danny Zook – sample clearance

== Charts ==
=== Weekly charts ===
Chart (2013)	Peak position
Canadian Albums Chart	10
UK R&B Albums (Official Charts)	8
US Billboard 200	1
US Top R&B/Hip-Hop Albums (Billboard)	1

Chart (2025)	Peak position
Dutch Albums (Album Top 100)	69

=== Year-end charts ===
Chart (2013)	Position
US Billboard 200	80
US Top R&B/Hip-Hop Albums (Billboard)	19
US Top Rap Albums (Billboard)	12

== Certifications ==
Region	Certification	Certified units/sales
New Zealand (RMNZ)	Gold	7,500^{‡}
United States (RIAA)	Gold	500,000^{‡}
^{‡} Sales+streaming figures based on certification alone.

== Release history ==
Region	Date	Format	Label
United Kingdom	June 24, 2013	CD; digital download	Maybach Music
United States	June 25, 2013	CD; digital download	Maybach Music
Germany	June 28, 2013	CD; digital download	Maybach Music
Australia	June 28, 2013	CD; digital download	Maybach Music
