= 2013 Soul Train Music Awards =

Music awards ceremony in Nevada, US

Soul Train Music Awards
- Date: December 1, 2013
- Location: Orleans Arena; Paradise, Nevada
- Country: United States
- Hosted by: Anthony Anderson
- First award: 1987

Highlights
- Most awards: Robin Thicke, T.I., Pharrell Williams and Tamar Braxton (2)
- Website: soultrain.com

Television/radio coverage
- Network: BET, Centric

The 2013 Soul Train Music Awards ceremony took place on December 1, 2013 at the Orleans Arena in Paradise, Nevada and was hosted by comedian and actor Anthony Anderson. The ceremony was aired on BET and Centric and included special tributes to Dionne Warwick, who received the Soul Train Legend Award and Keith Sweat given the Lifetime Achievement Award.

Tamar Braxton and Robin Thicke took the lead as the big winner's during the ceremony; including Braxton taking Record of the Year and Thicke taking Song of the Year.

== Special awards ==
=== Lifetime Achievement Award ===
- Keith Sweat

=== Legend Award ===
- Dionne Warwick

== Winners and nominees ==
Winners are in bold text.

=== Album of the Year ===
- **Kendrick Lamar – Good Kid, M.A.A.D City**
  - Fantasia – Side Effects of You
  - Jay Z – Magna Carta Holy Grail
  - Miguel – Kaleidoscope Dream
  - Rihanna – Unapologetic
  - Justin Timberlake – The 20/20 Experience

=== Song of the Year ===
- **Robin Thicke (featuring T.I. and Pharrell Williams) – "Blurred Lines"**
  - Tamar Braxton – "Love and War"
  - Chris Brown – "Fine China"
  - Kendrick Lamar (featuring Drake) – "Poetic Justice"
  - Rihanna – "Diamonds"
  - Justin Timberlake (featuring Jay Z) – "Suit & Tie"

=== Video of the Year ===
- **Janelle Monáe (featuring Erykah Badu) – "Q.U.E.E.N."**
  - Tamar Braxton – "Love and War"
  - Chris Brown – "Fine China"
  - Drake – "Started from the Bottom"
  - Kendrick Lamar (featuring Drake) – "Poetic Justice"
  - Robin Thicke (featuring T.I. and Pharrell Williams) – "Blurred Lines"

=== The Ashford & Simpson Songwriter's Award ===
- **Tamar Braxton – "Love and War"**
  - **Written by: Tamar Braxton, Darhyl Camper Jr., LaShawn Daniels and Makeba Riddick**
- Fantasia – "Lose to Win"
  - Written by: Franne Golde, Dennis Lambert, Andrea Martin, Walter Orange and Harmony Samuels
- J. Cole – "Crooked Smile"
  - Written by: Jermaine Cole and Meleni Smith
- Alicia Keys (featuring Maxwell) – "Fire We Make"
  - Written by: Gary Clark Jr., Warren Felder, Alicia Keys and Andrew Wansel
- Janelle Monáe (featuring Erykah Badu) – "Q.U.E.E.N."
  - Written by: Roman GianArthur Irvin, Dr. Nathaniel Irvin III, Charles Joseph II, Janelle Monáe Robinson and Kellis Parker Jr.
- Justin Timberlake – "Mirrors"
  - Written by: James Fauntleroy, Jerome Harmon, Timothy Mosley and Justin Timberlake

=== Best R&B/Soul Male Artist ===
- **Miguel**
  - Chris Brown
  - John Legend
  - Bruno Mars
  - Robin Thicke
  - Charlie Wilson

=== Best R&B/Soul Female Artist (The Chaka Khan Award for Best R&B/Soul Female) ===
- **Tamar Braxton**
  - Fantasia
  - Alicia Keys
  - Chrisette Michele
  - Janelle Monáe
  - Kelly Rowland

=== Best New Artist ===
- **K. Michelle**
  - Tamar Braxton
  - Bridget Kelly
  - Kendrick Lamar
  - TGT

=== Centric Award ===
- **Luke James**
  - Stacy Barthe
  - Lyfe Jennings
  - Talib Kweli
  - Solange
  - Joss Stone

=== Best Gospel/Inspirational Performance ===
- **Tye Tribbett – "If He Did It Before (Same God)"**
  - Tasha Cobbs – "Break Every Chain"
  - LeCrae – "Confessions"
  - Hezekiah Walker – "Every Praise"
  - Shirley Caesar – "God Will Make a Way"
  - John P. Kee – "Life & Favor"

=== Best Hip-Hop Song of the Year ===
- **Wale (featuring Tiara Thomas) – "Bad"**
  - Drake – "Started from the Bottom"
  - J. Cole (featuring Miguel) – "Power Trip"
  - Jay Z (featuring Justin Timberlake) – "Holy Grail"
  - Kendrick Lamar (featuring Drake) – "Poetic Justice"
  - Nicki Minaj (featuring Lil Wayne) – "High School"

=== Best Dance Performance ===
- **Ciara – "Body Party"**
  - Chris Brown – "Fine China"
  - Bruno Mars – "Treasure"
  - Janelle Monáe (featuring Erykah Badu) – "Q.U.E.E.N."
  - Robin Thicke (featuring T.I. and Pharrell Williams) – "Blurred Lines"
  - Justin Timberlake (featuring Jay Z) – "Suit & Tie"

=== Best Collaboration ===
- **Robin Thicke (featuring T.I. and Pharrell Williams) – "Blurred Lines"**
  - Brandy (featuring Chris Brown) – "Put It Down"
  - J. Cole (featuring Miguel) – "Power Trip"
  - Alicia Keys (featuring Maxwell) – "Fire We Make"
  - Miguel (featuring Kendrick Lamar) – "How Many Drinks?"
  - Janelle Monáe (featuring Erykah Badu) – "Q.U.E.E.N."
  - Wale (featuring Sam Dew) – "LoveHate Thing"

=== CENTRICTV.com Awards ===
==== Best Independent R&B/Soul Performance ====
- **Ashanti – "Never Should Have"**
  - Raheem DeVaughn – "A Place Called Love Land"
  - Ronald Isley – "Dinner and a Movie"
  - Kenny Lattimore – "Find a Way"
  - Maysa Leak – "Love Me Good"
  - Brian McKnight – "Sweeter"

==== Best International Performance ====
- **Bunji Garlin – "Differentology"**
  - Iyanya – "Ur Waist"
  - Machel Montano – "Bend Over"
  - P-Square – "Personally"
  - Emeli Sandé – "Next to Me"

==== Best Traditional Jazz Artist/Group ====
- **Nicole Henry – "Waiting in Vain"**
  - Tony Bennett (featuring Marc Anthony) – "For Once in My Life"
  - George Benson (featuring Wynton Marsalis) – "Unforgettable"
  - Terence Blanchard – "Pet Step Sitter's Theme Song"
  - Jeffrey Osborne (featuring Chaka Khan) – "Baby, It's Cold Outside"

==== Best Contemporary Jazz Artist/Group ====
- **George Duke – "Missing You"**
  - Michael Bublé – "It's A Beautiful Day"
  - Boney James (featuring Rick Braun) – "Batucada (The Beat)"
  - José James – "Trouble"
  - Dave Koz – "Got to Get You into My Life"

== Performers ==
- Jennifer Hudson
- Chaka Khan
- Evelyn "Champagne" King
- K. Michelle
- Jon B.
- Dave Koz
- Vanilla Ice
- T.I.
- Wale
- Tamar Braxton
- Bobby Caldwell
- Doug E. Fresh
- Slick Rick
- Big Daddy Kane
- Warren G
- Smokey Robinson

=== Tribute performers ===
Keith Sweat Tribute

- Keith Sweat
- Faith Evans

Keith Sweat performed in honor of his own tribute; a medley of his most popular songs, also a duet with Faith Evans for his song "Make It Last Forever".

Dionne Warwick Tribute

- Ron Isley
- Chrisette Michele
- Ruben Studdard
- Candice Glover
- Gladys Knight (featuring David Foster on Piano)
- Eric Benét
- Eddie Levert
- Kenny Lattimore
- Bobby V

== Telecast ==
The Soul Train Awards were aired on BET and Centric on December 1, 2013.
