= Clappers (song) =

Single by Wale featuring Nicki Minaj and Juicy J

from the album The Gifted
- Released: September 3, 2013
- Recorded: 2013
- Genre: Hip-hop
- Length: 5:16
- Label: Allido; Maybach Music Group; Atlantic
- Songwriters: Daniel Johnson; Folarin; Onika Maraj; Jordan Houston
- Producers: Kane Beatz; Mark Henry Beats; No Credit; Juicy J

Wale singles chronology
"Poor Decisions" (2013)	"Clappers" (2013)	"You Don't Know What to Do" (2014)

Nicki Minaj singles chronology
"I Wanna Be with You" (2013)	"Clappers" (2013)	"Lookin Ass" (2014)

Juicy J singles chronology
"23" (2013)	"Clappers" (2013)	"Lolly" (2013)

"Clappers" is a hip hop song by American rapper Wale, released as the third single from his third studio album The Gifted. The song features Nicki Minaj and Juicy J, is produced by Kane Beatz, Mark Henry Beats, No Credit and Juicy J, and samples the Experience Unlimited song "Da Butt". The song was released on September 3, 2013

== Music video ==
The music video was directed by Benny Boom and premiered on September 3, 2013.

== Remix ==
On February 3, 2014, the official remix was released, featuring Rick Ross, Fat Trel and Young Thug. The remix also features a new beat produced by Hit-Boy.

== Chart performance ==
Chart (2013)	Peak position
US Bubbling Under Hot 100 (Billboard)	8
US Hot R&B/Hip-Hop Songs (Billboard)	37

== Release history ==
Country	Date	Format	Label
United States	September 3, 2013	Urban contemporary radio	Maybach Music Group; Atlantic
