= LoveHate Thing =

Single by Wale featuring Sam Dew

from the album The Gifted
- Released: May 21, 2013
- Recorded: 2013
- Genre: Hip hop; R&B
- Length: 4:27
- Label: Allido; Maybach Music Group; Atlantic
- Songwriters: Folarin; Antonio Palmer; Stokley Williams; Sam Dew
- Producers: Tone P; Stokley Williams (co.); Sam Dew (co.)

Wale singles chronology
"So Many Girls" (2013)	"LoveHate Thing" (2013)	"Bad (Remix)" (2013)

Sam Dew singles chronology
"LoveHate Thing" (2013)

Music video
- "LoveHate Thing" on YouTube

"LoveHate Thing" is a song by American hip hop recording artist Wale featuring vocals from Roc Nation singer Sam Dew. It was co-written by both artists, along with Antonio Palmer and Mint Condition's Stokley Williams, who also co-produced the song with Dew and Tone P. It was released on May 21, 2013 as the second single from his third studio album The Gifted (2013).

The song garnered a positive reception from critics. "LoveHate Thing" peaked at number 89 on the Billboard Hot 100. It also reached numbers 25 and 30 on the Rhythmic and Hot R&B/Hip-Hop Songs charts respectively. It was certified Platinum by the Recording Industry Association of America (RIAA), denoting sales of over 1,000,000 units in the United States. A music video directed by Sarah McColgan was made for the single that features Wale both performing with a backing band on a rooftop and going to places in his hometown of Washington D.C.

Wale first performed the song live on the Late Show with David Letterman and made a later appearance at the 2013 Soul Train Awards with co-writer and producer Williams.

== Critical reception ==
AllMusic's David Jeffries gave the song a "Track Pick" tag, calling it "a breezy summertime jam reminiscing with plenty of gun talk and reckless stories of youth." While mixed towards the album, Evan Rytlewski of The A.V. Club put the track alongside "Gullible" for giving it "a respectable stretch of strutting, '70s-soul throwbacks." The song was nominated for Best Collaboration at the 2013 Soul Train Awards, but lost to Robin Thicke's "Blurred Lines" with Pharrell and T.I.

== Music video ==
The music video was released on June 23, 2013. Directed by Sarah McColgan, the video features a suited up Wale joining a backing band on a rooftop to perform with them. Intercut are scenes of Wale from his days as a struggling rapper from D.C. to where he is because of his success.

== Live performances ==
Wale first performed "LoveHate Thing" with Sam Dew on the Late Show with David Letterman on June 26, 2013. He performed the song again as a mashup with Marvin Gaye's "Inner City Blues" alongside Williams at the 2013 Soul Train Awards on December 1, 2013.

== Charts ==
=== Weekly charts ===
Chart (2013)	Peak position
US Billboard Hot 100	89
US Hot R&B/Hip-Hop Songs (Billboard)	30
US Rhythmic Airplay (Billboard)	25

Chart (2025)	Peak position
Austria (Ö3 Austria Top 40)	41
Czech Republic Singles Digital (ČNS IFPI)	61
Germany (GfK)	46
Ireland (IRMA)	97
Latvia (LaIPA)	17
Lithuania (AGATA)	29
Netherlands (Single Top 100)	37
Slovakia Singles Digital (ČNS IFPI)	61
Sweden (Sverigetopplistan)	79
Switzerland (Schweizer Hitparade)	38
UK Hip Hop/R&B (Official Charts)	21

=== Year-end charts ===
Chart (2013)	Position
US Hot R&B/Hip-Hop Songs (Billboard)	97

== Certifications ==
Region	Certification	Certified units/sales
Australia (ARIA)	Gold	35,000^{‡}
New Zealand (RMNZ)	Gold	15,000^{‡}
United States (RIAA)	Platinum	1,000,000^{‡}
^{‡} Sales+streaming figures based on certification alone.

== Release history ==
Country	Date	Format	Label
United States	May 21, 2013	Digital download	Maybach Music Group, Atlantic
