= Folarin (album) =

Mixtape by Wale
- Released: December 24, 2012
- Recorded: 2012
- Genre: Hip-hop
- Length: 70:39
- Labels: The Board Administration; Maybach Music; Warner Bros.
- Producers: Danny!; Aaron Wess; LG; No Credit; Rico Beats; Beat Billionaire; Tiara Thomas; Kelson Camp; Jake One; Cardo; Nottz; Joe K; Cheeze Beatz; Tone P.; Willie B; Diplo; Austin Millz; Key Wane; AppleJuice Kid

Wale chronology
| The Eleven One Eleven Theory (2011) | Folarin (2012) | The Gifted (2013) |

Singles from Folarin
- 1. "Bad" Released: February 5, 2013

Folarin is the eighth mixtape by American rapper Wale, it was released on December 24, 2012. The mixtape features guest appearances from Rick Ross, 2 Chainz, Tiara Thomas, Scarface, Nipsey Hussle, French Montana, Chinx Drugz, Jhené Aiko, Travis Porter, Trinidad James, Hit-Boy, and Chrisette Michele among others.

== Background ==
The mixtape was announced on November 14, 2012. On November 14, 2012, the first song was released in promotion of the mixtape titled "Freedom of Speech". On December 13, 2012, the song "Back 2 Ballin'" featuring French Montana was released. On December 17, 2012, the second song was released in promotion of the mixtape titled "Too Much Talk". On December 20, 2012, the third song was released in promotion of the mixtape titled "The Blessings". On January 17, 2013, the music video was released for "Never Never". On February 17, 2013, the music video was released for "Let a Nigga Know" featuring Chinx Drugz and Fatz. On February 21, 2013, the music video was released for "Street Runner". On March 20, 2013, the music video was released for "The Show" featuring Rick Ross and Aaron Wess. On March 20, 2013, the music video was released for "Bad" featuring Tiara Thomas. "Bad" would also go on to be released as a single and has so far peaked at #36 on the Billboard Hot 100, making it Thomas' first Hot 100 entry, and one of Wale's most successful singles of his career. On April 23, 2013, the music video was released for "The One Eyed Kitten Song" featuring Travis Porter.

== Critical reception ==
Professional ratings
Review scores
| Source | Rating |
|---|---|
| BET | 3/5 stars |

Folarin was met with generally positive reviews from music critics. Jesse Fairfax of HipHopDX said "In Wale's quest to bridge the gap between progressive Hip Hop and the lowest common denominator, his ongoing identity crisis risks confusing the large audience he caters to. With Folarin aiming to be all things to all people, its primary drawback is the inconsistency that accompanies this sort of branding. Though disappointing in some regards, Folarin manages to win with intense wordplay during its more inspired moments." Calvin Stovall of BET gave the mixtape three out of five stars, saying "On Folarin, Wale bounces through the mainstream rap universe, sampling the talents of his peers and giving fans the occasional flashes from his past needed to keep getting minutes from Coach Rozay. By underground and mainstream standards, he "made it." Folarin is not a definite swerve in either direction, but it certainly justifies one more strong push from the Maybach Music Group mothership. His helter skelter flow and intricate rhyme patterns are a return to his essence that will satisfy fans of his early mixtapes."

== Track listing ==
| No. | Title | Producer(s) | Length |
|---|---|---|---|
| 1. | "The Forward" (performed by G Mogul) | Aaron Wess | 1:59 |
| 2. | "Change Up" | LG | 2:56 |
| 3. | "The Show" (featuring Rick Ross and Aaron Wess) | No Credit | 3:44 |
| 4. | "Let a Nigga Know" (featuring Chinx Drugz and Fatz da Big Fella) | Rico Beats | 3:33 |
| 5. | "Get Me Doe" (featuring 2 Chainz) | Beat Billionaire | 3:57 |
| 6. | "Bad" (featuring Tiara Thomas) | Tiara Thomas; Kelson Camp | 4:17 |
| 7. | "Limitless" (featuring Scarface) | Jake One | 3:38 |
| 8. | "Chun Li" (featuring Nipsey Hussle) | Cardo | 4:04 |
| 9. | "Skool Daze" | Nottz | 3:42 |
| 10. | "H2O" | Joe K | 3:41 |
| 11. | "Street Runner" | Beat Billionaire | 2:56 |
| 12. | "Back 2 Ballin'" (featuring French Montana) | Cheeze Beatz | 3:22 |
| 13. | "Cool Off" (featuring Jhené Aiko) | Tone P. | 3:19 |
| 14. | "Fa We We Freestyle" | Willie B | 2:55 |
| 15. | "The One Eyed Kitten Song" (featuring Travis Porter) | Diplo | 3:08 |
| 16. | "Flat Out" (featuring Trinidad James) | Beat Billionaire | 3:51 |
| 17. | "Ji-Dope" | Beat Billionaire | 2:43 |
| 18. | "The Right One" (featuring Hit-Boy) | Austin Millz | 3:07 |
| 19. | "Money Changes" (featuring Chrisette Michele) | Key Wane | 3:18 |
| 20. | "Georgetown Press" (featuring Lightshow) | AppleJuice Kid | 4:20 |
| 21. | "Never Never Freestyle" | Danny! | 2:09 |
