= Bag of Money =

Single by Wale featuring Rick Ross, Meek Mill and T-Pain

from the album Self Made Vol. 2
- Released: April 3, 2012
- Recorded: 2012
- Genre: Hip hop
- Length: 4:06
- Label: Allido, Maybach, Asylum, Warner Bros.
- Songwriter(s): Olubowale Akintemehin, Shamann Cooke, Faheem Najm, William Roberts, Robert Williams
- Producer(s): Beat Billionaire

Wale singles chronology
"Sabotage" (2012)	"Bag of Money" (2012)	"Diced Pineapples" (2012)

"Bag of Money" is a song by American rapper Wale, featuring T-Pain and Wale's fellow Maybach Music Group labelmates Rick Ross and Meek Mill. It peaked at number 64 on the Billboard Hot 100, number 3 on the Hot Rap Songs chart, and number 2 on the Hot R&B/Hip-Hop Songs chart.

== Critical reception ==
Ian Cohen of Pitchfork Media said "as far as "My bitch bad, lookin' like a bag of money" (the hook from "Bag of Money", natch) goes, I don't think women like being compared to formless sacks, but Ross really likes money, so a compliment's a compliment".

== Remix ==
There are two versions of the remix; The main remix and the extended remix. The original remix features the original guests Rick Ross & T-Pain (Meek Mill's verse is omitted), Omarion, Lil Wayne, Yo Gotti, French Montana, Black Cobain & Trina (only background vocals), The extended remix features the guests that are in the main remix but features extra verses from Tyga, Trina (only had background vocals on the main remix), Rockie Fresh & an extended Yo Gotti, French Montana & Black Cobain verses. This remix clocks in at exactly 9 minutes.

== Charts ==
=== Weekly charts ===
Chart (2012)	Peak position
US Billboard Hot 100	64
US Hot R&B/Hip-Hop Songs (Billboard)	2
US Hot Rap Songs (Billboard)	3
US Rhythmic (Billboard)	19

=== Year-end charts ===
Chart (2012)	Position
US Hot R&B/Hip-Hop Songs (Billboard)	23
