= Sam Dew =

American singer-songwriter

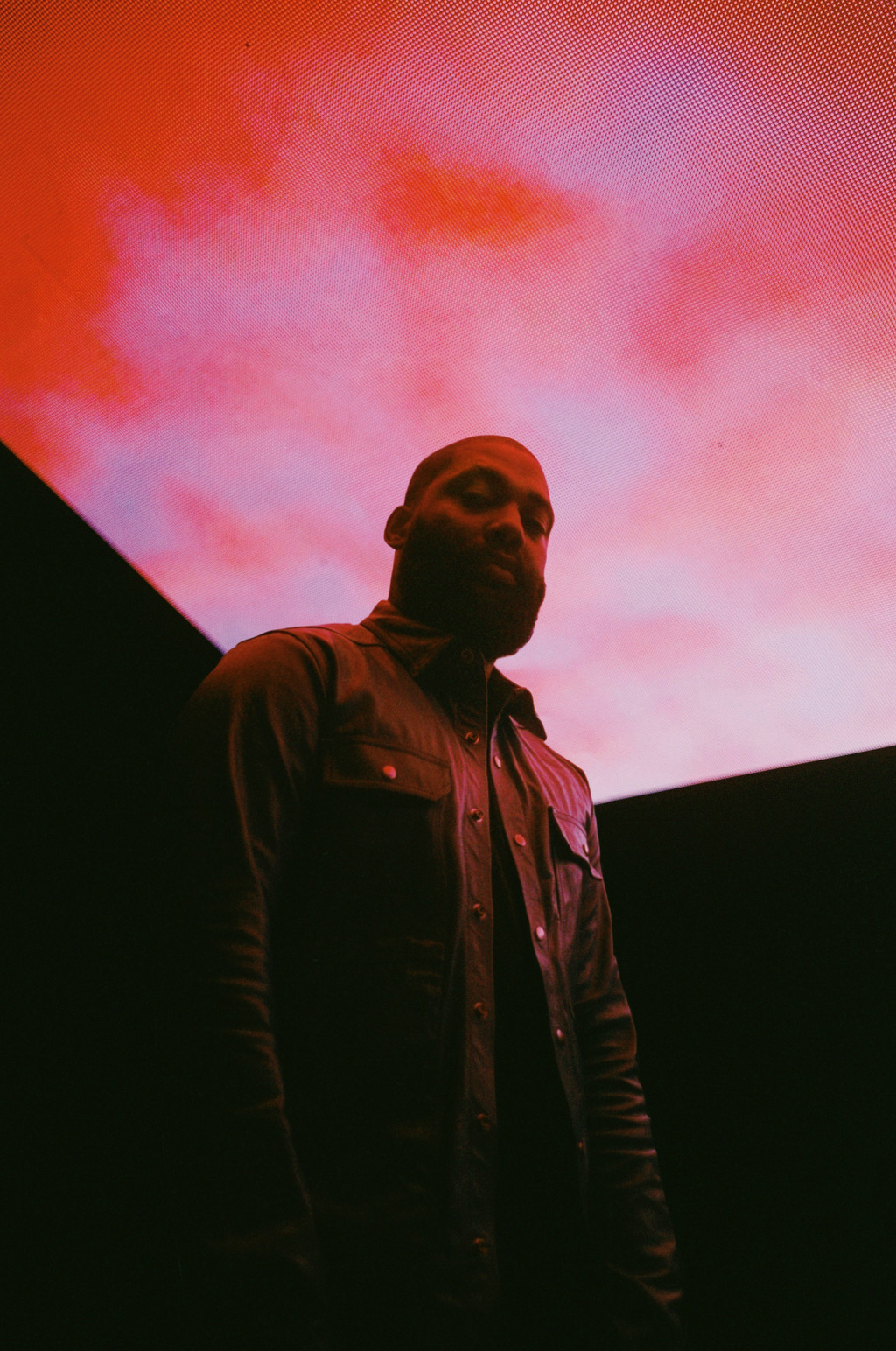
- Dew in 2021

Background information
- Born: Samuel Joseph Dew
- Origin: Chicago, Illinois
- Genres: R&B; hip hop
- Occupations: Singer; songwriter
- Instrument: Vocals
- Years active: 2011–present
- Labels: Roc Nation; RCA
- Website: moonlitfools.com

Samuel Joseph Dew is an American singer and songwriter from Chicago, Illinois. As a recording artist, he is best known for his 2022 song "Savior" (with Kendrick Lamar and Baby Keem) and his guest appearance on Wale's 2013 single "LoveHate Thing", both of which entered the Billboard Hot 100. His songwriting work has been credited on albums for Taylor Swift, Marsha Ambrosius, Rihanna, Mary J. Blige, Miguel, Zayn Malik and Jessie Ware, among others.

He signed with RCA Records to release his debut extended play, Damn Sue (2015). His debut studio album, Moonlit Fools (2021) was met with critical praise.

== Career ==
Dew is originally from Chicago, Illinois. His music style has been compared to other singers with a wide vocal range. He performed with the Atlanta-based band Cloudeater through 2013 and the release of their final album, Purge. Dew began writing music and has since penned for musicians including Marsha Ambrosius, Rihanna, Mary J. Blige, and Jessie Ware. Dew's first song of his writing career was "Lotus Flower Bomb" for rapper Wale. The song eventually topped Billboard's Hot R&B/Hip-Hop Songs chart. Dew is also the co-writer for Skrillex's 2014 single "Stranger", from the album Recess. The song also appeared in the soundtrack for the 2014 film Divergent.

Dew co-wrote and performed the hook to Wale's single "LoveHate Thing", from his 2013 album The Gifted. The song peaked at number 89 on the U.S. Billboard Hot 100, as well as number 30 on Billboard's Hot R&B/Hip-Hop Songs and number 25 on Billboard's Rhythmic chart. The song was also nominated for a 2013 Soul Train Music Award for best collaboration. One of his most notable collaborations came in December 2014 with the release of Shell Shock, a collaboration with Dave Sitek and vocalist Alice Smith in reaction to the death of Eric Garner.

In 2015, Dew signed with RCA Records. He wrote the hook for Wale's 2015 song "The Matrimony", performed by featured singer Usher. He also wrote and sings the hook on British producer Julio Bashmore's track "Holding On". His debut EP, Damn Sue, produced by TV on the Radio member Dave Sitek, was released on April 7, 2015. That same year, he contributed vocals on the Prefuse 73 EP Forsyth Gardens.

In 2017, Dew co-wrote Taylor Swift and Zayn's single "I Don't Wanna Live Forever" with Swift and Jack Antonoff. In August of that year, Dew released the singles Runner" and "Remember".

In 2019, with fellow producers and frequent collaborators Jack Antonoff and Sounwave, Dew formed the musical trio Red Hearse. Their self-titled debut studio album was released in August of that year.

On February 26, 2021, Dew released his debut studio album Moonlit Fools.

In 2022, Dew guest performed on Kendrick Lamar's album Mr. Morale & The Big Steppers, co-wrote with Taylor Swift on her album Midnights, and worked with Joji on his album Smithereens.

== Discography ==
=== Album ===
- Moonlit Fools (2021)

=== Extended plays ===
Title	Album details
Damn Sue	Released: April 7, 2015; Label: RCA Records

=== Singles ===
Title	Details
"Runner"	Released: August 25, 2017; Label: RCA Records
"Remember"	Released: August 28, 2017; Label: RCA Records

=== Songwriting discography ===
Title	Year	Artist(s)	Album
"Lotus Flower Bomb" (featuring Miguel)	2011	Wale	Ambition
"Sabotage" (featuring Lloyd)	2011	Wale	Ambition
"Ice Cold" (featuring Omarion)	2012	Rick Ross	God Forgives, I Don't
"Numb" (featuring Eminem)	2012	Rihanna	Unapologetic
"LoveHate Thing" (featuring Sam Dew)	2013	Wale	The Gifted
"Sunshine"	2013	Wale	The Gifted
"Heaven's Afternoon" (featuring Meek Mill)	2013	Wale	The Gifted
"Gullible" (featuring Cee-Lo Green)	2013	Wale	The Gifted
"Bricks" (featuring Yo Gotti and Lyfe Jennings)	2013	Wale	The Gifted
"Black Heroes / Outro About Nothing" (featuring Jerry Seinfeld)	2013	Wale	The Gifted
"Friends"	2013	Bridget Kelly	Cut to... Bridget Kelly
"The Mouth"	2013	Bridget Kelly	Cut to... Bridget Kelly
"Self Love"	2014	Mary J. Blige	Think Like a Man Too
"Night Time"	2014	Marsha Ambrosius	Friends & Lovers
"Sweetest Song"	2014	Jessie Ware	Tough Love
"Keep on Lying"	2014	Jessie Ware	Tough Love
"All on You"	2014	Jessie Ware	Tough Love
"The Matrimony" (featuring Usher)	2015	Wale	The Album About Nothing
"Silly Girls"	2015	Estelle	True Romance
"What You Don't Do"	2015	Lianne La Havas	Blood
"Midnight"	2015	Lianne La Havas	Blood
"Gomenasai"	2015	Kelela	Hallucinogen
"Before the Fire"	2016	Santigold	99¢
"Skull"	2016	Clams Casino	32 Levels
"Thanks to You" (featuring Sam Dew)	2016	Clams Casino	32 Levels
"A Breath Away" (featuring Kelela)	2016	Clams Casino	32 Levels
"Ghost in a Kiss" (featuring Samuel T. Herring)	2016	Clams Casino	32 Levels
"It's Just a Fever" (Intro)	2016	Snoh Aalegra	Don't Explain
"Home"	2016	Snoh Aalegra	Don't Explain
"It's All on Me" (Outro)	2016	Snoh Aalegra	Don't Explain
"I Don't Wanna Live Forever"	2016	Zayn and Taylor Swift	Fifty Shades Darker: Original Motion Picture Soundtrack
"Hard Liquor"	2017	SOHN	Rennen
"I'm Ready to Move On/Mickey Mantle Reprise"	2017	Bleachers	Gone Now
"Frontline"	2017	Kelela	Take Me Apart
"Blue Light"	2017	Kelela	Take Me Apart
"Better Life"	2017	Pink	Beautiful Trauma
"I Might"	2017	BRIDGE	Wreck
"Insomnia"	2018	Zayn	Icarus Falls
"What Am I?"	2019	Mahalia	Love and Compromise
"Richie"	2019	Mahalia	Love and Compromise
"Automatic"	2019	Miquela	Non-album single
"Machine" (featuring Teyana Taylor)	2020	Miquela	Non-album single
"When the World Stops Turning"	2020	Chris Malinchak	Night Work
"That Kind of Woman"	2021	Dua Lipa	Future Nostalgia: The Moonlight Edition
"Flowers"	2021	Kelly Rowland	K
"Hitman"	2021	Kelly Rowland	K
"Doesn't Mean a Thing"	2021	Maeta	Habits
"United in Grief"	2022	Kendrick Lamar	Mr. Morale & the Big Steppers
"N95"	2022	Kendrick Lamar	Mr. Morale & the Big Steppers
"Worldwide Steppers"	2022	Kendrick Lamar	Mr. Morale & the Big Steppers
"Die Hard" (with Blxst and Amanda Reifer)	2022	Kendrick Lamar	Mr. Morale & the Big Steppers
"Rich" (Interlude)	2022	Kendrick Lamar	Mr. Morale & the Big Steppers
"Rich Spirit"	2022	Kendrick Lamar	Mr. Morale & the Big Steppers
"Purple Hearts" (with Summer Walker and Ghostface Killah)	2022	Kendrick Lamar	Mr. Morale & the Big Steppers
"Count Me Out"	2022	Kendrick Lamar	Mr. Morale & the Big Steppers
"Crown"	2022	Kendrick Lamar	Mr. Morale & the Big Steppers
"Savior" (with Baby Keem and Sam Dew)	2022	Kendrick Lamar	Mr. Morale & the Big Steppers
"Mr. Morale" (with Tanna Leone)	2022	Kendrick Lamar	Mr. Morale & the Big Steppers
"Mother I Sober" (featuring Beth Gibbons)	2022	Kendrick Lamar	Mr. Morale & the Big Steppers
"Turn Up the Sunshine" (featuring Tame Impala)	2022	Diana Ross	The Rise of Gru
"Cool"	2022	Verdine White	The Rise of Gru
"Lavender Haze"	2022	Taylor Swift	Midnights
"Glitch"	2022	Taylor Swift	Midnights
"Before the Day Is Over"	2022	Joji	Smithereens
"A&W"	2023	Lana Del Rey	Did You Know That There's a Tunnel Under Ocean Blvd
"Forgiving Myself"	2023	Sekou	Out of Mind
"Dramatic Girl"	2026	Baby Keem	Casino
