= Lotus Flower Bomb =

Single by Wale featuring Miguel

from the album Ambition
- Released: October 11, 2011
- Recorded: 2011
- Genre: Pop rap; R&B
- Length: 3:33: 3:24 (radio edit sped up same tempo)
- Label: Allido; Maybach Music Group; Warner Bros.
- Songwriters: Olubowale Akintimehin; Miguel Pimentel; Sam Dew
- Producer: Jerrin Howard

Wale singles chronology
"That Way" (2011)	"Lotus Flower Bomb" (2011)	"I'm On" (2011)

Miguel singles chronology
"Quickie" (2011)	"Lotus Flower Bomb" (2011)	"Pride N Joy" (2012)

Music video
- "Lotus Flower Bomb" on YouTube

"Lotus Flower Bomb" is a song by American hip hop recording artist Wale, released as the lead single from his second studio album Ambition. The song was officially released on October 11, 2011 through Allido Records, Maybach Music Group and Warner Bros. The song, featuring R&B singer Miguel, was produced by Jerrin Howard. The song received a nomination for Best Rap Song at the 55th Grammy Awards.

== Background ==
Wale released "Lotus Flower Bomb" on October 11, 2011, a few weeks before the release of his highly anticipated second studio album "Ambition".

== Remixes ==
Rapper Nelly did a remix to "Lotus Flower Bomb", which appeared on his 2011 mixtape O.E.M.O..

== Music video ==
The music video shot in Atlanta, Georgia, was directed by Taj. The video depicts a scene from Poetic Justice, where Wale is a mailman who is trying to charm the beauty salon owner played by Bre Scullark from America's Next Top Model. The car depicted in the video is a Lotus Evora.

== Chart performance ==
"Lotus Flower Bomb" charted on the U.S. Billboard Hot 100 for the week of October 18, 2011 at #87. The song peaked at #38 on the Hot 100, making it Wale's biggest hit as a lead artist, until his 2013 single, "Bad", which peaked at #21 on the Hot 100. As of July 2013, the song has sold 620,000 copies.

== Charts ==
=== Weekly charts ===
Chart (2011–12)	Peak position
US Billboard Hot 100	38
US Hot R&B/Hip-Hop Songs (Billboard)	1
US Hot Rap Songs (Billboard)	3
US Rhythmic Airplay (Billboard)	11

=== Year-end charts ===
Chart (2012)	Position
US Hot R&B/Hip-Hop Songs (Billboard)	3
US Rap Songs (Billboard)	9
US Rhythmic (Billboard)	44

=== Decade-end charts ===
Chart (2010–2019)	Position
US Hot R&B/Hip-Hop Songs (Billboard)	40

== Certifications ==
Region	Certification	Certified units/sales
Canada (Music Canada)	Gold	40,000^{‡}
New Zealand (RMNZ)	Platinum	30,000^{‡}
United States (RIAA)	2× Platinum	2,000,000^{‡}
^{‡} Sales+streaming figures based on certification alone.

== Release information ==
Country	Date	Format	Label	Ref
United States	October 11, 2011	Digital download	Maybach Music Group, Allido Records	

== See also ==
- List of number-one R&B singles of 2012 (U.S.)
