= Bad (Wale song) =

2013 song by Wale

- Original version featuring Tiara Thomas cover

Single by Wale featuring Tiara Thomas or Rihanna

from the album The Gifted
- Released: February 5, 2013
- Recorded: 2012
- Genre: Hip-hop; R&B
- Length: 4:18
- Label: Allido; Maybach Music Group; Atlantic
- Songwriters: Kelson Camp; Olubowale Akintimehin; Tiara Thomas
- Producers: Kelson Camp; Tiara Thomas

Wale singles chronology
"Bad Ass" (2013)	"Bad" (2013)	"So Many Girls" (2013)

Tiara Thomas singles chronology
"Bad" (2013)	"Another Day" (2014)

Music video
- "Bad" on YouTube

Alternative cover
- Remix version featuring Rihanna cover

Rihanna singles chronology
"Right Now" (2013)	"Bad" (remix) (2013)	"What Now" (2013)

"Bad" is a song by the American rapper Wale. It was released on February 5, 2013, as the first single from his third album The Gifted (2013). The song, produced by Kelson Camp, features a guest appearance from Tiara Thomas. The song was officially remixed with the inclusion of guest vocals by the Barbadian singer Rihanna. The remix was digitally released via the iTunes Store on June 3, 2013. It also appeared on Wale's album, The Gifted.

== Background ==
The song was originally released on December 24, 2012, on Wale's mixtape Folarin, but would later appear on his album The Gifted. On May 10, 2013, Rihanna posted a photo of herself and Wale working in a studio via Instagram. It was later confirmed that the pair had recorded a remix of the single.

== Composition ==
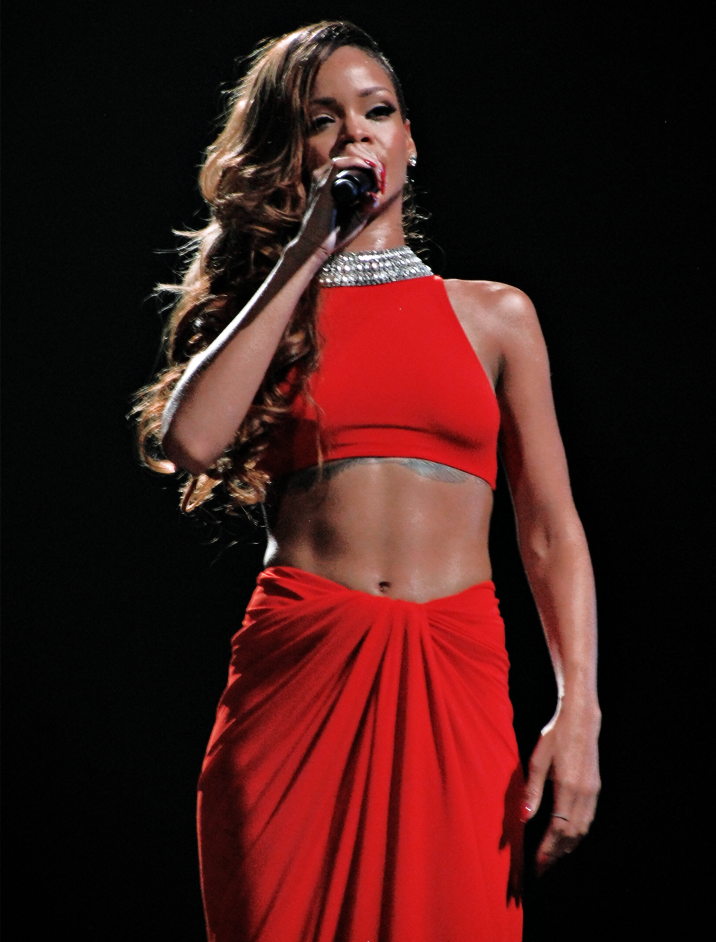
Rihanna lent her vocals for the remix of "Bad".

As noted by MTV, the remix starts with moody synth keys before the familiar "bed springs" squeak, which appeared in the original track, lead to the infidelity-laced hook. Wale and Rihanna also trade rap bars: "Bad girls ain't no good and the good girls ain't no fun," he spits before she answers: "And the bad girls want a real nigga." Rihanna tweaks Tiara Thomas' original section into her own, adding a "touch of her seductive island accent". "Is it bad that, I never made love. I never did it, but I sure know how to fuck," she sings tragically. Wale and Rihanna play off one another on the track and voice their inner turmoil involving the opposite sex. Rihanna sings (also later raps) in response to Wale's laments about a difficult relationship and praises of hot sex on the "bed, floor, couch, more."

== Critical reception ==
Rob Markman of MTV gave the remix a positive review saying, "These days, most rap remixes usually consists of a loose collection of MCs collaborating over pre-existing instrumentals, but for the remix to his hit single 'Bad', Wale had the good sense to do something different. Instead of rounding up a predictable cast of rap characters, Folarin retooled the beat and then added Rihanna to the remix."

== Commercial performance ==
"Bad" peaked at number 21 on the US Billboard Hot 100, making it Wale's third Top 40 entry after "No Hands" and "Lotus Flower Bomb", and becoming his highest-charting single as a lead artist.

== Music video ==
Wale spoke about the concept of the video in an interview saying, "It was an amazing experience because it felt like a real movie, The concept of the video is about a girl. She's trying to find herself by means of intimacy. She hasn't really discovered what she wants out of love or lust. It's almost a true story about some of the girls I've been with or courted." It features a cameo from Rick Ross. The music video was directed by Alexandre Moors and premiered on March 20, 2013, on 106 & Park.

== Track listing ==
- Original single
1. "Bad" (featuring Tiara Thomas) – 4:18
- Remix single
1. "Bad" (Remix; featuring Rihanna) – 3:58

== Charts ==
=== Weekly charts ===
Chart (2013)	Peak position
France (SNEP)	141
UK Singles (Official Charts)	112
UK Hip Hop/R&B (Official Charts)	20
US Billboard Hot 100	21
US Hot R&B/Hip-Hop Songs (Billboard)	5
US Adult R&B Songs (Billboard)	31
US Rhythmic Airplay (Billboard)	5

Chart (2025)	Peak position
Philippines Hot 100 (Billboard Philippines)	100

Chart (2026)	Peak position
Greece International (IFPI) Remix featuring Rihanna	47

=== Year-end charts ===
Chart (2013)	Position
US Billboard Hot 100	59
US Hot R&B/Hip-Hop Songs (Billboard)	13
US Rap Songs (Billboard)	10
US Rhythmic (Billboard)	25

== Certifications ==
Region	Certification	Certified units/sales
Canada (Music Canada)	Platinum	80,000^{‡}
New Zealand (RMNZ)	2× Platinum	60,000^{‡}
United States (RIAA)	3× Platinum	3,000,000^{‡}
^{‡} Sales+streaming figures based on certification alone.

== Release history ==
Country	Date	Format	Version	Label
United States	February 5, 2013	Digital download	Original	Maybach Music Group, Atlantic
United States	June 3, 2013	Digital download	Remix	Maybach Music Group, Atlantic
