= Black Cobain =

American rapper from Virginia

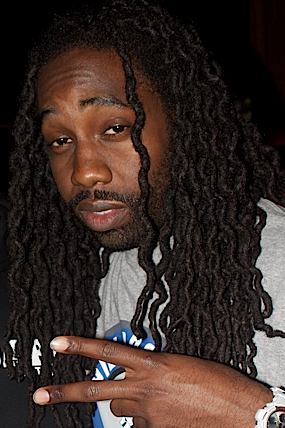
- Cobain in 2010

Background information
- Born: Marcus Vance Gloster; April 29, 1986 (age 40); Alexandria, Virginia, U.S.
- Genres: Hip hop; R&B
- Occupation: Rapper
- Years active: 2009–present
- Labels: The Board Administration; Every Blue Moon; Jet Life; EMPIRE; RBC; E1
- Website: theboardadministration.com

Marcus Vance Gloster (born April 29, 1986), known professionally as Black Cobain, is an American rapper. He collaborated on the Wale track "4 AM" and was the opening act of Wale's 2011-2012 53-city "Ambition" tour.

== Background ==
Black Cobain was born in Alexandria, Virginia, and fell in love with hip hop at an early age. His MC moniker "Black Cobain" originated from his childhood nickname "Black" being combined with "Cobain", in homage to his uncle who introduced him to rock and roll and the world-renowned band Nirvana, with frontman Kurt Cobain.

Black Cobain attended Virginia State University, graduated magna cum laude, and obtained employment at the Boys & Girls Club, uncertain he could make a viable living and income from his ambitions as an emcee. During this time, he linked with long-time friend and mentor, Le'Greg O. Harrison, and under his direction began to professionalize his sound and actively exploit his talent through local performances, collaborations, sets, and freestyles. In 2009, Black signed to The Board Administration as their first official signee and shortly thereafter left full-time employment to fully pursue emceeing as a career.

== Career ==
=== 2008–2010 ===
Black Cobain performed the local circuit and various open mics within the DC, Maryland, and Virginia areas to garner attention and heighten awareness of his brand. Despite his affiliation with Wale and The Board Administration, he worked tirelessly to cultivate his own buzz and did not collaborate with Wale until years after signing with the label, because he put in his own groundwork and operates by his childhood reality and philosophy that nothing is ever given, more so earned.

After a solid run releasing freestyles and frequenting local performance venues, Black Cobain released his debut mixtape, Now or Never. Now or Never focused on his transition into adulthood and the perils of inner city life. A year later, he released a second mixtape, Now, a demonstration of a more evolved emcee and better articulated and confident Black Cobain. Now had features from Wale, Raheem Devaughn, J. Holiday, and Wiz Khalifa. Later the same year, he was featured as the spokesperson for the 2010 Rocksmith Tokyo fall/winter campaign alongside Wale.

=== 2011–present ===
His 2011 mixtape, Young, Gifted & Black, hosted by Rocksmith Tokyo, featured Wale, Stalley, and production from Tone P and 88-Keys.

Black Cobain has the most carbon footprints of any emerging artist by touring 53+ markets worldwide as the official opener for Wale's Ambition Tour 2011-2012. He was placed under consideration by XXL magazine as a 2012 Freshman Class Candidate. He recently completed the 2012 leg of the Ambition Tour with Wale.

In April 2012 he toured the United Kingdom as the featured rap artist in the Mark Ronson Royal Ballet production "Carbon Life" alongside singers Boy George, Hero Fisher, Alison Mosshart, Jonathan Pierce and Mr. Wyatt. Black Cobain released his fourth mixtape, Cheers, on April 30, 2012, executive produced by Le'Greg O. Harrison of The Board Administration. Cheers is hosted by Orisue and Live Mixtapes and has features from Wale, Magazeen, J. Holiday, Jose Guapo, and Tre, and production from Tone P, Beat Billionaire, Hello Chi-City, Mark Henry, and Jay Amadeus.

On April 25, 2012, Black Cobain cut his hair to signify professional growth and development into the next stage of his career as an artist. This transition took his fan base by surprise but was welcomed after he explained his reasoning for the departure from his long locks.

In August 2012 Black Cobain toured as an official opener for the Meek Mill Dreams and Nightmares Tour. He is also featured on Wale's track Bag of Money Remix alongside Rick Ross, Lil Wayne, Yo Gotti, T-Pain, French Montana, and Omarion.

He is a member of the national African American fraternity, Phi Beta Sigma (ΦΒΣ). He was initiated into the Alpha Alpha Alpha Chapter at Virginia State University. He is being considered for the 2014 XXL magazine freshman class.

== Discography ==
Albums

- 2024: Everything 4 Sale

Mixtapes

- 2009: Now or Never
- 2010: Now
- 2011: Young, Gifted & Black
- 2012: Cheers
- 2013: Perfect Contradiction
- 2015: No Buzz (Hosted by DJ Scream & DJ Carisma)
- 2017: Whole Time Vol. 1
- 2018: Whole Time Vol. 2
- 2020: Coffe And OG
- 2021: Cobizzy
