= Tiara Thomas =

American R&B singer

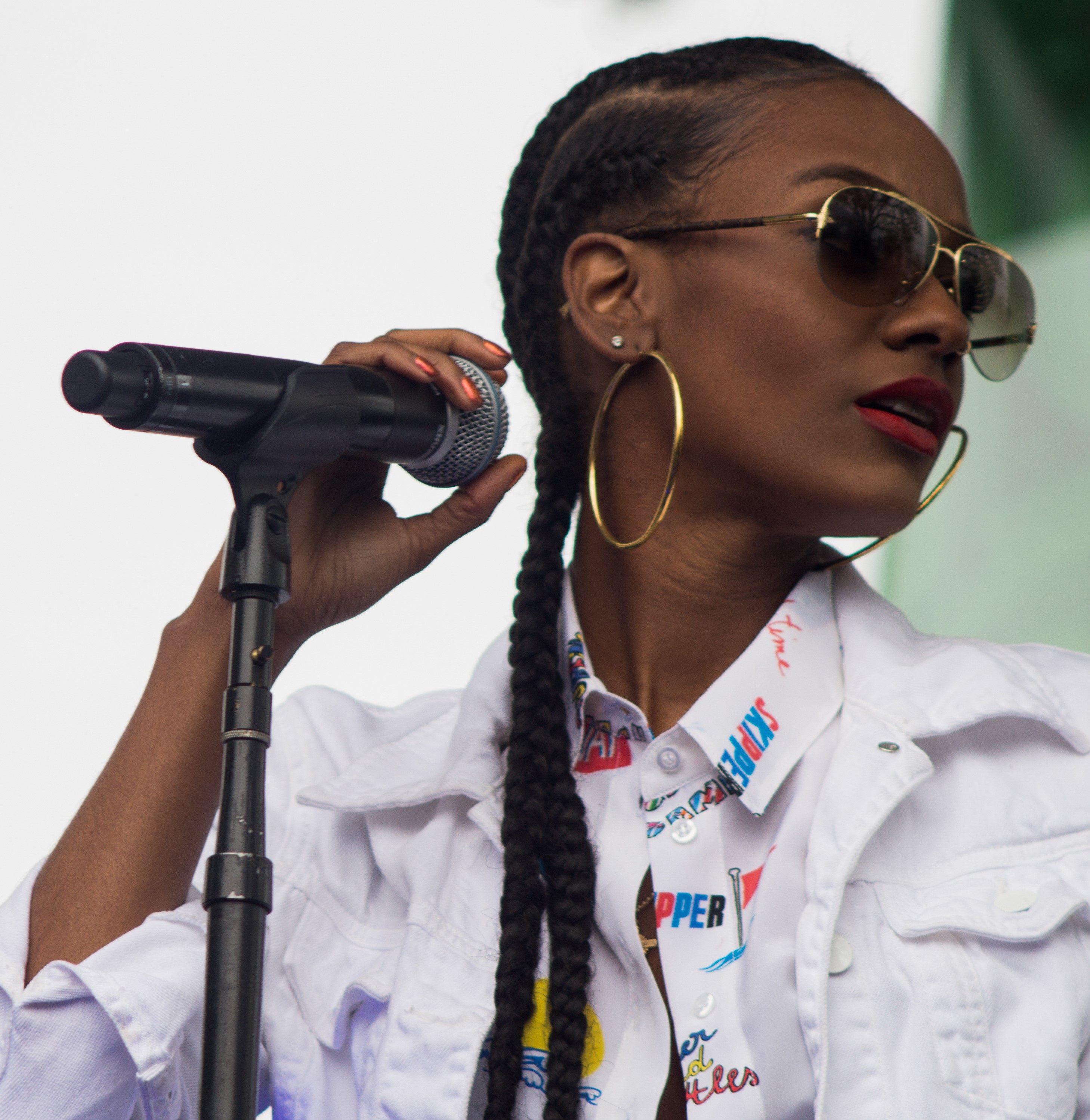
- Thomas in 2015

Background information
- Born: Tiara Nicole Thomas; September 12, 1989 (age 36); Indianapolis, Indiana, U.S.
- Education: Ball State University (BS)
- Genres: R&B
- Occupations: Singer; songwriter
- Years active: 2009–present
- Labels: Division 1; Interscope; Public; The Board Administration
- Website: tiarathomasmusic.com

Tiara Nicole Thomas (born September 12, 1989) is an American R&B singer. She is best known for her guest appearance on Wale's 2013 single "Bad", which peaked within the top 40 of the Billboard Hot 100 and received triple platinum certification by the RIAA. That same year, Thomas signed with Rico Love's Division1 record label, an imprint of Interscope Records.

Thomas won Song of the Year at the 2021 Grammy Awards for co-writing H.E.R.'s song "I Can't Breathe". That same year, she received a Golden Globe nomination and won an Academy Award for Best Original Song, for co-writing the song "Fight for You", from Judas and the Black Messiah.

== Early life ==
Thomas was born in Indianapolis, Indiana. Her parents encouraged her to pursue music. Thomas performed in school and church. She attended Lawrence North High School. A hardcore fan of hip hop and pop music, Thomas developed her sound early and set out to carve her own lane in music by fusing her love for pop and alternative music, ballads, and rap with instrumentation. In June 2012, Thomas graduated from Ball State University.

== Career ==
=== 2009–2012: Early career ===
Thomas met founders of The Board Administration, Wale and Le'Greg O. Harrison, in a club in Atlanta, Georgia, during a Wale concert in 2009. After exchanging information and submitting music, she received a response and positive feedback after three months. Shortly thereafter, she traveled to New York City where she opened for Wale and shared the stage with Diggy Simmons, J. Cole, and Fabolous at the Highline Ballroom. Thomas signed to The Board Administration in 2011.

She is well known for viral promotions via Twitter and YouTube and recognized for new online musical content, live performance streams, and cover performances of popular music. On August 3, 2010, the world was introduced to Thomas on "The Cloud" with Wale through his mixtape More About Nothing. Her name trended worldwide on May 30, 2011, on Twitter, the day "The Cloud" video released.

Thomas was selected as a 2011–2012 Campaign Spokesperson for the American Eagle Outfitters Back to School We The People Campaign. Her likeness is canvassed in New York City's Times Square at the American Eagle Outfitters flagship Store Location and across the continental U.S. in all 900+ stores worldwide. Her original songs for the campaign, "Denim" and "Wassup", are featured on the American Eagle Outfitters website and were circulated to the masses through their social media campaign.

=== 2013–present: "Bad", Dear Sallie Mae, and debut album ===
Thomas worked on her debut LP Sallie Mae, and was featured on Wale's single "Bad". The latter peaked at number 21 on the Billboard Hot 100, becoming her first Hot 100 and top 40 entry. In June 2013, it was announced she had left Wale's record label The Board Administration to sign with Rico Love's Division 1 record label in a joint deal with Interscope Geffen A&M.

Thomas released a five-song EP titled Dear Sallie Mae on October 8, 2013.

== Discography ==
- Dear Sallie Mae (EP) (2013)
- The Bad Influence (2014)
- Up in Smoke (EP) (2015)
- Don't Mention My Name (EP) (2017)
- FWMM (EP) (2018)

=== As lead artist ===
List of singles, showing year released
Title	Year
"One Night"	2014

=== As featured artist ===
List of singles, with selected chart positions, showing year released and album name
Title	Year	Peak chart positions			Certifications	Album
Title	Year	US	US R&B	US Rap	Certifications	Album
"Bad" (Wale featuring Tiara Thomas or Rihanna)	2013	21	5	3	RIAA: 3× Platinum	The Gifted
"Another Day" (Fat Joe featuring Rick Ross, French Montana and Tiara Thomas)	2014	—	—	—		Non-album singles
"—" denotes a recording that did not chart or was not released in that territory.
