= Wale (rapper) =

American rapper (born 1984)

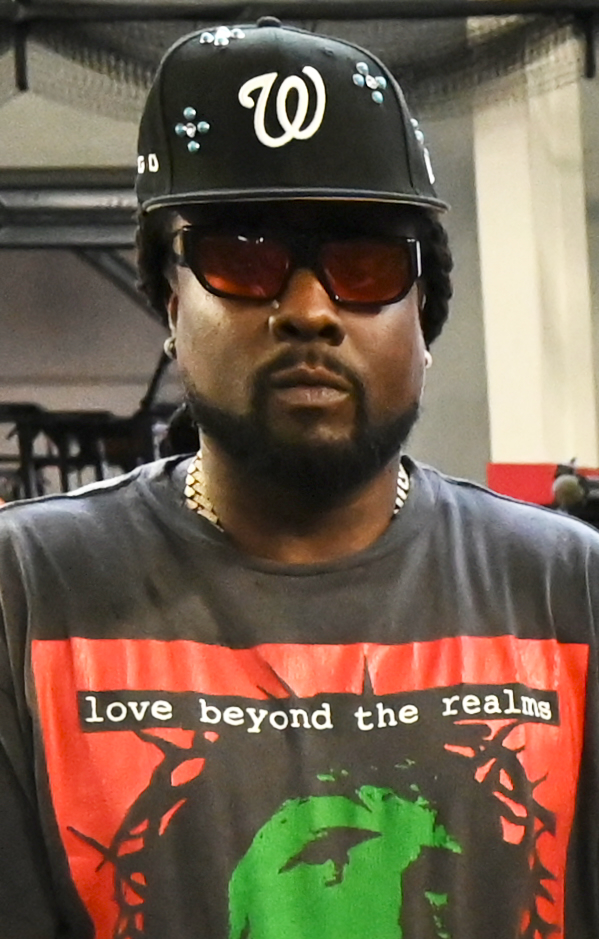
- Wale in 2024

Background information
- Also known as: Ralph Folarin
- Born: Olubowale Victor Akintimehin; September 21, 1984 (age 42); Washington, D.C., U.S.
- Genre: DMV hip-hop
- Occupations: Rapper; singer; songwriter
- Works: Wale discography
- Years active: 2005–present
- Labels: Def Jam; Every Blue Moon; Maybach Music; Warner; Atlantic; Roc Nation; Interscope; Allido; The Board Administration
- Formerly of: All City Chess Club
- Children: 1
- Website: walemusic.com

Olubowale Victor Akintimehin (born September 21, 1984), known professionally as Wale (/ˈwɔːleɪ/ WAH-lay), is an American rapper. He first became known for his 2006 song "Dig Dug (Shake It)", which became popular in his hometown of Germantown, Maryland and led Wale to gain further local recognition as he amassed a number of follow-up releases. He signed a recording contract with English DJ-producer Mark Ronson's Allido Records in 2007, which, after a three-label bidding war, entered a joint venture with Interscope Records for US$1.3 million the following year. During this time, Wale's mixtapes and singles saw numerous attention as he appeared on MTV and various Black America-focused magazines.

Wale's debut studio album, Attention Deficit (2009) was under-shipped and thus underperformed commercially, but saw positive critical reception and spawned his first Billboard Hot 100 entry with its lead single, "Chillin" (featuring Lady Gaga). He continued gaining mainstream recognition with his guest appearance alongside Roscoe Dash on Waka Flocka Flame's 2010 single "No Hands", which peaked at number 13 on the chart and received diamond certification by the Recording Industry Association of America (RIAA). He then signed with Florida-based rapper Rick Ross' Maybach Music Group, an imprint of Warner Records the following year to release his second album, Ambition (2011). Supported by the Grammy Award-nominated top 40 single "Lotus Flower Bomb" (featuring Miguel), the album saw further critical and commercial success, and peaked at number two on the Billboard 200. His third and fourth albums, The Gifted (2013) and The Album About Nothing (2015), both debuted atop the chart; the former was led by the single "Bad" (featuring Tiara Thomas), which peaked at number 21 on the Billboard Hot 100 and remains his highest-charting entry as a lead artist.

Wale shifted for a lighter, commercially-oriented approach with his next three albums: Shine (2017), Wow... That's Crazy (2019), and Folarin II (2021). They spawned the Billboard Hot 100-charting singles "My PYT", "On Chill" (featuring Jeremih), and "Poke It Out" (featuring J. Cole), respectively. Folarin II marked his final album with Maybach Music Group, and he signed with Def Jam Recordings in the following year of its release.

== Biography ==
=== 1984–2007: Early life and career beginnings ===
Olubowale Victor Akintimehin was born on September 21, 1984, in Northwest, Washington, D.C. His parents were both from the Yoruba ethnic group of southwestern Nigeria and came from Austria to the United States in 1979. Wale's family first lived in the Brightwood neighborhood of Northwest, Washington, D.C., and then moved to Montgomery County, Maryland, when Wale was 10. In 2002, he graduated from the Quince Orchard High School in Gaithersburg and moved to Largo in Prince George's County. Wale attended Robert Morris University and Virginia State University on football scholarships, then transferred to Bowie State University. However, he dropped out due to academic reasons. Wale's love of the game of football and the team then known as Washington Redskins has led to a longstanding rumor that Wale had a tattoo of tight end Chris Cooley. He is the cousin of actor Gbenga Akinnagbe, who is best known for playing Chris Partlow on HBO's The Wire. Wale's first recorded track, called "Rhyme of the Century", became his first song to be played on the local radio. In 2006, he was featured in the "Unsigned Hype" column of The Source magazine and later signed to a local label, Studio 43. The track "Dig Dug (Shake It)" became popular in Washington, D.C., Maryland, and Virginia and was a tribute to Ronald "Dig Dug" Dixon, who was a percussion player for the go-go band Northeast Groovers. The song became the most requested song by a local artist in Washington, D.C. radio history and Wale was the first local artist to get some BDS spins since DJ Kool in the early 1990s. The song was included in Wale's first mixtape, Paint a Picture, which was released in 2005.

In July 2006, Wale found representation in Daniel Weisman, a former club DJ and promoter who had no previous experience in management. Weisman had been tipped off about the rapper by a friend in Washington, D.C. and connected with him through Myspace. In September 2006, after dropping another go-go influenced single, called "Breakdown" (sampled from Huck-A-Bucks "Sexy Girl") has been getting a mention on The Washington Post, Wale released his first non-go-go original single, called "Uptown Roamers". On September 14, 2006, "Uptown Roamers" debuted on XM Radio Channel 66, where it was played twice in one day. Both "Breakdown" and "Uptown Roamers" were on Wale's second mixtape, Hate Is the New Love. The song "Breakdown" was featured on the video game Madden NFL 09. Wale won the award for "D. C. Metro Breakthrough Artist of the Year" at WKYS's Go-Go Awards in November 2006. On December 15, The Fader magazine associate editor Nick "Catchdubs" Barat visited Wale for an interview and photo shoot, which appeared in the March 2007 issue of The Fader. Manager Weisman told HitQuarters that the Fader feature, given the magazine's music/culture/fashion orientation, laid an important foundation for Wale to position himself as a "cool, smart, up-and-coming hip-hop artist who might be Drake".

=== 2007–2009: National attention and major label signing ===
In January 2007, Wale released a new single to radio called "Good Girls" produced by Gerard Thomas and Demario Bridges for TeamMusicGroup (LeTroy Davis). Wale later appeared on Mark Ronson's remix of Lily Allen's "Smile" and was a headliner on Ronson's UK tour that year promoting Ronson's second album Version. In June 2007, Wale signed to a production deal with Ronson's Allido Records. Wale released his third mixtape, 100 Miles & Running, on July 11, as a free download on his Myspace page. This mixtape includes features from Mark Ronson, Daniel Merriweather, Amy Winehouse, and Lily Allen. It was released on the same day as his performance at the Highline Ballroom, in Manhattan. The Highline show was to promote the US release of Mark Ronson's album and included performances by Mark Ronson, Wale, Saigon, and Daniel Merriweather. Jay-Z, Beyoncé, Kanye West, Maroon 5, Clive Davis, Eve and Danny Masterson were all in attendance. There, Wale was interviewed by MTV News correspondent J. D. Tuminski for his first national TV feature on August 16. With Ronson, Wale performed "W.A.L.E.D.A.N.C.E.", a remix of Justice's "D.A.N.C.E." from Wale's 100 Miles mixtape, at the 2007 MTV Video Music Awards in Las Vegas. The Washington Post profiled Wale on the front page of the Sunday Style section in the October 21, 2007, edition. He was also featured on the cover of the 150th issue of URB along with French electro group Justice.

In March 2008, Wale signed a joint venture deal with Mark Ronson's Allido Records and Interscope, joining Rhymefest and Daniel Merriweather as Allido artists. Epic Records, Atlantic Records, and Def Jam all competed to sign Wale. On May 30, Wale released his fourth mixtape The Mixtape About Nothing, heavily produced by Best Kept Secret. Wale said that the television show Seinfeld inspired The Mixtape About Nothing: "the TV show's 'honest dialogue' mirrors his lyrical style, which frequently references pop culture and politics while avoiding gangster-rap bluster". After signing with Interscope, Wale began recording tracks for his major label debut; in a 2008 interview with Express, a newspaper published by the Washington Post Company, Wale announced that he was recording a song with Chrisette Michele called "Shades", which discusses inter-black racism. Wale and rapper Young Chris of the rap duo Young Gunz also began plans for a collaboration mixtape. In September 2008, Wale was featured on a remix of Solange's "Fuck the Industry". He also appeared alongside Lupe Fiasco and Kardinal Offishall on Interscope label mate DJ Greg Street's single "Dope Boys" which samples "They Reminisce Over You (T.R.O.Y.)".

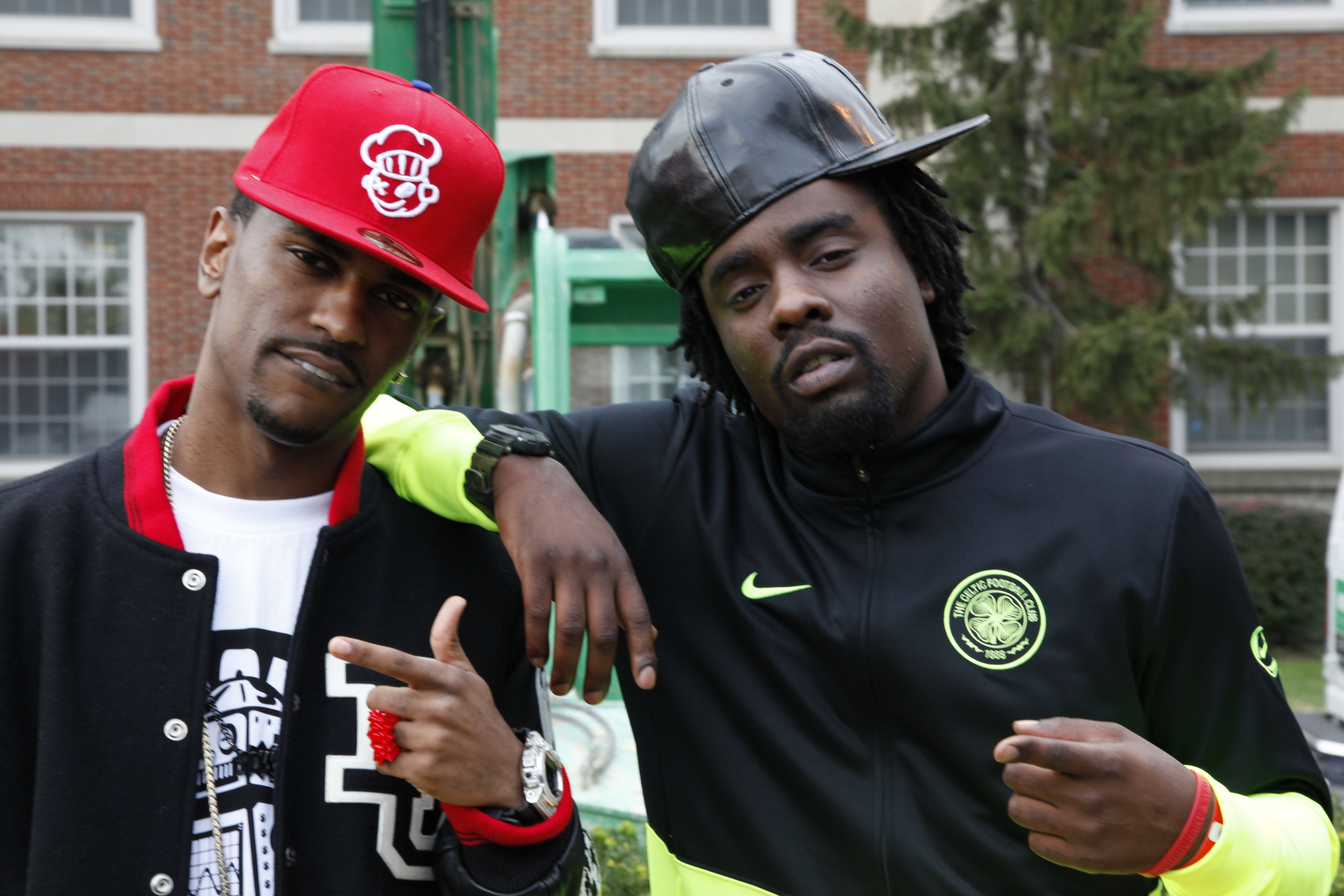
Wale (right) and fellow rapper Big Sean in 2009

On June 19, 2009, Wale released his fifth mixtape, Back to the Feature, on which eleven of the tracks were produced by 9th Wonder, with contributions also coming from Mark Ronson and others. The album's title, a play off the name of the movie Back to the Future, referred to the fact that a lengthy list of rappers joined Wale on the songs, including K'naan, Tamere Guess, Talib Kweli, Joell Ortiz, Beanie Sigel, Currensy, J. Cole, and Bun B. The mixtape received positive reviews from Vibe magazine and website Pitchfork, but Colin McGowan of Cokemachineglow commented that it represented neither "a step forward or back [for the artist] so much as shouting-in-place." Wale did a guest performance on "Change", a song by the Australian singer-songwriter Daniel Merriweather. It was written by Merriweather and Andrew Wyatt and produced by Mark Ronson. It was released on January 30, 2009, in the United States and Canada, and February 2, 2009, in the UK (where the song peaked at no.8). The song is included on Merriweather's album Love & War. On September 13, Wale and the DC-based musicians of UCB (Uncalled 4 Band) served as the official house band for the 2009 MTV Video Music Awards.

=== 2009–2010: Attention Deficit ===
Released on November 10, 2009, Wale's debut album, Attention Deficit, had primarily positive reception. Metacritic, which assigns a standardized score out of 100, rated the album 77 based on 21 reviews. It debuted at the number 21 spot on the Billboard 200 and sold 28,000 copies in its first week. Interscope claimed that the LP was undershipped and that was the reason for the low sales numbers. Daniel Weisman, Wale's manager, claimed that Interscope didn't ship enough copies of the album. The first single off Attention Deficit was "Chillin" (featuring Lady Gaga), followed by "Pretty Girls" featuring Gucci Mane and Weensey and "World Tour" (featuring Jazmine Sullivan). Other guest artists on the album included Pharrell Williams, Bun B, Chrisette Michele, K'Naan, Marsha Ambrosius, J. Cole, and Melanie Fiona. In March 2010, Wale announced he and K'Naan would kick off a short co-headlining tour across the east coast of the US, beginning at the end of March in New York City. During this time, Wale was also in the studio with Gucci Mane, Waka Flocka Flame, Roscoe Dash, Sean Garrett, and Drumma Boy.

In May 2010, Wale abruptly canceled a scheduled performance at DC Black Pride, an annual black gay pride event. In an email to the event's organizer, Wale's manager claimed he was unaware it was a gay event when he agreed to perform. On May 28, however, it was announced he would perform alongside the headliner for free.

On August 3, 2010, Wale released his sixth mixtape, More About Nothing, a follow-up to his critically acclaimed The Mixtape About Nothing, under The Board Administration – an independent label co-founded with Marketing Executive Le'Greg O. Harrison. Hosted by DJ Omega, More About Nothing had 100,000+ downloads in 90 minutes. More About Nothing integrates sitcom material with rhyme and wordplay to present Wale's frustrations on his plight to reach mainstream acceptance and success. Features include Wiz Khalifa, Waka Flocka, Daniel Merriweather, UCB, and Board Administration Artists Tiara Thomas, Black Cobain, and Fat Trel, as well as NBA Player and DC Native Kevin Durant. In the last half of 2010, inspired by Kanye West's GOOD Fridays project, Wale re-released a track from one of his previous mixtapes for free-download on his own website every Thursday, calling this enterprise "Throwback Thursday". Guests on those tracks included Bun B, Pusha T, John Mayer, Lil Wayne, and K'Naan.

=== 2011: Signing to MMG and Ambition ===
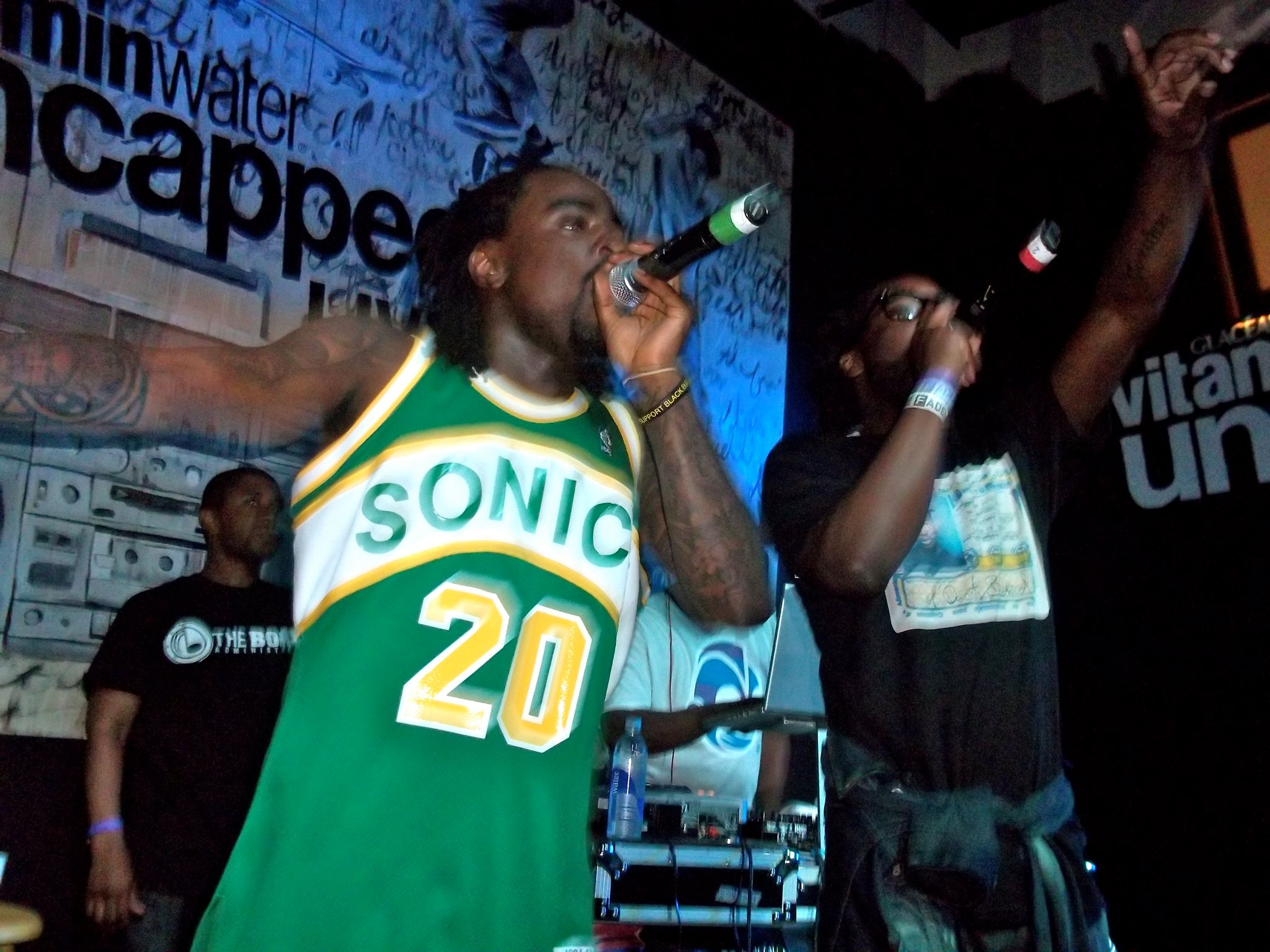
Wale performs with Black Cobain in his hometown of Washington, D.C. in 2011.

On February 5, 2011, during Super Bowl XLV festivities, Wale announced his signing to artist Rick Ross' Maybach Music Group. He stated that he would still continue to be able to put out the music that he believes in, with the support of Rick Ross. In 2009, Wale signed to Jay-Z's Roc Nation for management, along with other artists such as J. Cole, Mark Ronson, Melanie Fiona, and Rihanna. On May 6, 2011, Wale shared plans with MTV Networks regarding the potential release of two albums in 2011. Later that month, he confirmed pre-production efforts for Ambition, his second album, slated for a fall 2011 release under Maybach and Warner Music Groups. Production for Ambition took place at ZAC Recording in Atlanta, Georgia with The Board Administration Producer Tone P. Anticipation for Ambition was incited through the release and heavy viral promotion of mixtape, The Eleven One Eleven Theory done under Wale's label, The Board Administration. The Eleven One Eleven Theory debuted August 17, 2011, on Life and Times in honor of Wale's Twitter milestone of reaching one million followers and was purposefully made with the intent to build widespread anticipation for the November 1 scheduled release date of Ambition. This marketing strategy was the brainchild of The Board Administration CEO Le'Greg O. Harrison and was executed through savvy social media integration, resulting in the first shut down of renowned file sharing site Hulkshare in the first 4 seconds of posting the link. Wale is the first mainstream artist to officially crash Hulkshare.

On September 7, 2011, Wale announced plans for a 32-city domestic tour titled The Ambition Tour, which began October 2, in Minneapolis Minnesota and continued through December 2011. The Board Administration Artist Black Cobain performed as the official opening act for each date and was followed by a rotation of various artists in select markets, including Rick Ross, J. Cole, Meek Mill, Pusha T, Big Sean, and Miguel. The tour was booked by NUE Agency. On September 28, 2011, Wale revealed that Ambition was complete and released the single "Lotus Flower Bomb", featuring Miguel on Twitter. The following day, Funk Master Flex debuted Wale's song "Tats on my Arms", featuring Rick Ross. The next day, Wale released the album cover for Ambition. On October 14, Wale released the single "Focused", featuring Kid Cudi. The official Ambition track listing includes 15 songs. The Board Administration launched a robust social media campaign integrating never-seen-before social media strategy and savvy to virally promote Ambition. The promotional campaign included a five-part "making of" documentary, a Twitter campaign centered on a hashtag blitz–aptly named #Ambition, daily new music and video releases from Wale, and promotional materials for purchase through Warner Music Group and Maybach Music Group such as Ambition wristbands and graphic tees. These efforts were also supported by televised "making of" episodes through networks such as MTV that hosted Sucker Free Road to Release. The never-seen-before element of Wale's Ambition promo blitz included a partnership formed between the current most popular file sharing site Hulkshare and The Board Administration. Greater than 3 million people frequent Hulkshare daily, and through this collaboration could view banner ads on practically every Hulkshare download page flanked with Wale's profile and a clock counting down the days, hours, minutes, and seconds until the album released.

On October 27, 2011, Wale unveiled an Ambition snippet sampler on YouTube for people to preview the album. Later the same day, a private Ambition media listening event, held at the Gansevoort Hotel of Chelsea New York, was attended by music executives, bloggers, various artists, and hip-hop heads. On November 2, 2011, Myspace and Hot 97 presented a complimentary Wale and friends midnight Ambition release show at The Highline Ballroom in New York City. The event was hosted by Miss Info and featured special guest DJ Funkmaster Flex. The album debuted number two on the Billboard 200, selling 162,600 copies in its first week. The album initially received mixed reviews, including a negative one in Wale's local Washington City Paper. However, the album currently holds a 69/100 score on Metacritic, signifying "generally favorable reviews".

=== 2012–2017: The Gifted, The Album About Nothing, Shine ===
On November 25, 2011, shortly after the release of Ambition, Wale announced on Twitter that he had already begun working on his third album. In an interview with UpVenue in January 2012, Wale confirmed the third album and said the focus would be about his growth as a person. In June, he was featured on Maybach Music Group's second studio album Self Made Vol. 2. He released a trailer for his mixtape Folarin on December 6. Folarin, hosted by DJ Clark Kent, was released on December 24. The mixtape featured Rick Ross, 2 Chainz, Scarface, Nipsey Hussle, French Montana, Tiara Thomas, Lightshow, and Trinidad James, with production by Hit-Boy, Jake One, Cardo, Diplo, Beat Billionaire, and Rico Love, among others. Around this time, Wale also started working on his third studio album, which he stated would be released in 2013.

When speaking of his third studio album Wale would say, "It's going to have one sound, very, very soulful", and said that the first single, "Bad", "is a pretty good indication of the direction I'm going for this project." The album was set for release on June 25, 2013, with his fourth album coming a couple months after that. Wale announced he was collaborating with Jerry Seinfeld on his fourth studio album, which would be titled The Album About Nothing. He later said he was also set to collaborate with producer No I.D. on the album, and would also release a collaboration mixtape with Meek Mill sometime during 2013.

In December 2012, Wale had announced plans to release a Go-go album: "I wanna do the album for me. This is the second time I'm announcing it, but I'm doing a Go-Go album after my album. And when I say Go-Go I don't mean like cheesy Go-Go. It's gonna be sequenced. It's gonna be me probably rapping only 40-percent on the album, but getting the sound out."

To build hype for The Gifted, Wale released "Sight of the Sun", a remix of the Fun. song of the same name. This was similar to the songs "Bittersweet" and "Fly Away", which he released prior to Attention: Deficit. On September 9, 2014, Wale released "The Body", featuring American singer Jeremih, as the first single from his album The Album About Nothing. On November 17, 2014, Wale announced a 31-date US tour, titled the Simply Nothing Tour, in support of his upcoming 2015 album The Album About Nothing. On December 24, 2014, Wale released the mixtape Festivus, which is heavily themed by the Seinfeld holiday. Features included Chance The Rapper, A$AP Ferg, and Pusha T, among others.

On March 31, 2015, Wale released his fourth studio album The Album About Nothing, which featured Jerry Seinfeld, J. Cole, Usher, and SZA. It became his second No. 1 album in the United States. The following month, it was revealed that Wale would next serve as the Executive Producer for Maybach Music Group's next collaborative album Self Made 4. He also recorded the original music theme for the popular ESPN sports talk show First Take, which features journalists/panelists Stephen A. Smith, Max Kellerman and moderator/host Molly Qerim. The two-hour show, which airs twice daily at 10 a.m. and 1 p.m. on ESPN, features Wale's theme at the beginning of the show.

On April 28, 2017, Wale's fifth studio album, Shine was released, selling 28,000 units in its first week.

=== 2018–2022: It's Complicated, Self Promotion, Warner Records, Free Lunch, Wow... That's Crazy and Folarin II ===
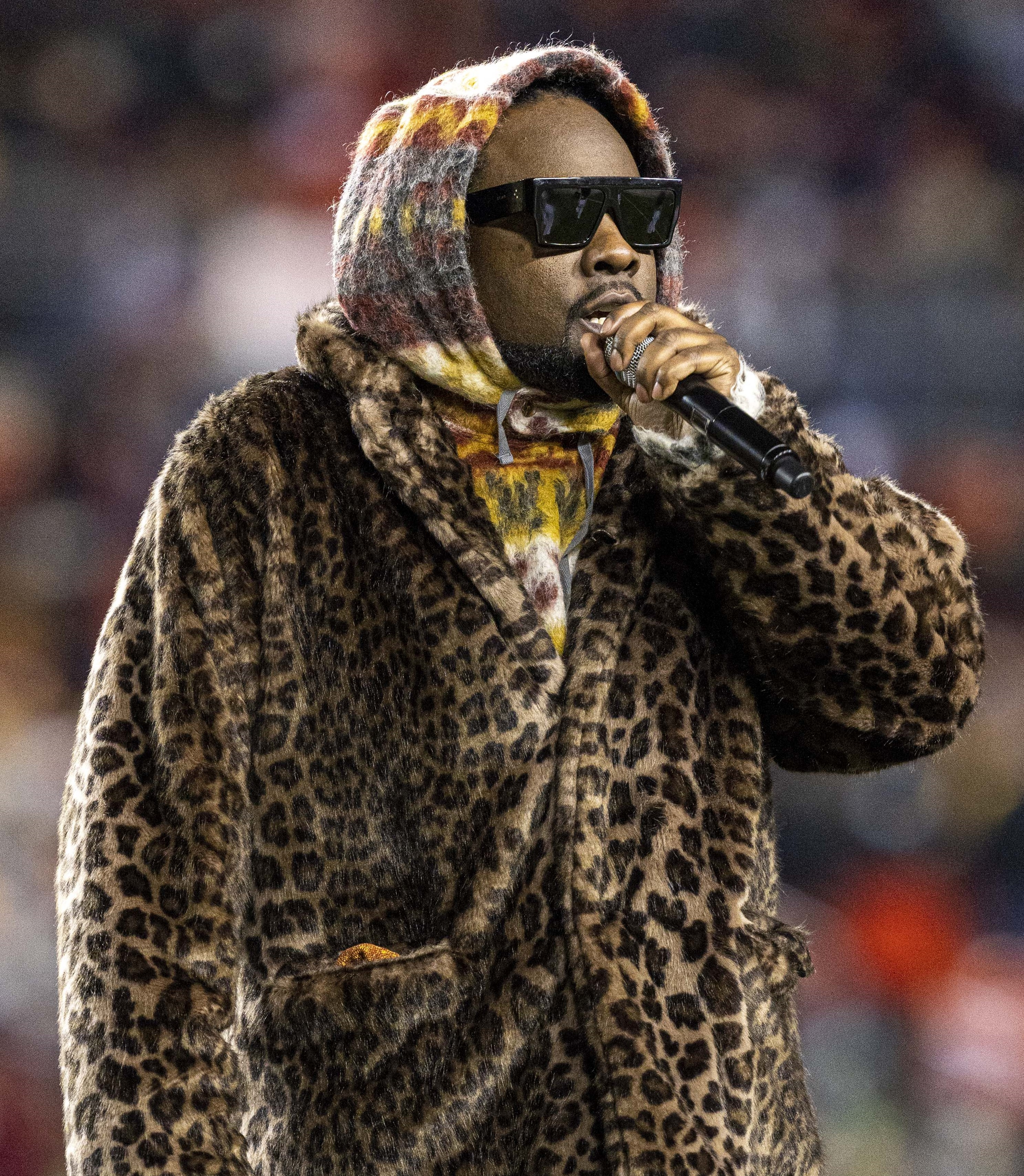
Wale performing at FedExField in 2021

After parting ways with Atlantic Records in February 2018, Wale released a surprise four-track EP titled It's Complicated on March 13. On May 8, 2018, he released a second EP titled Self Promotion. The four-track EP had a single guest feature in R&B singer Jacquees. On May 16, it was announced that Wale had been signed to Warner Records. On September 14, he released a third EP titled Free Lunch, with guest appearances from singer Eric Bellinger and long time friend and collaborator, J. Cole. In December 2018, Wale released two tracks, "Winter Wars" and "Poledancer". His sixth album, Wow... That's Crazy was released on October 11, 2019. It included the single "On Chill".

On June 19, 2020, Wale released an EP, The Imperfect Storm. On October 22, 2021, Wale released Folarin II, an album follow-up to his 2012 mixtape Folarin.

=== 2023–present: Signing with Def Jam and eighth studio album ===
On October 20, 2023, it was announced that Wale had signed with Def Jam Recordings. That same day, Wale released his first single for the label, "Max Julien". A music video for the song premiered three days later. On October 13, 2025, Wale announced his eighth studio album, Everything Is a Lot, which was released through Def Jam on November 14. In 2026, he embarked on the Everything Is a Lot Tour, which ran from May 28 to July 2.

== Musical style ==
In an interview with Flavorwire, Wale said that he incorporates elements of go-go in his music. Cyril Cordor of AllMusic described go-go as "a more raw, percussion-driven offshoot of disco" that originated in the Washington, D.C. area. Wale's early singles that were played primarily in his local metropolitan area heavily sampled 1990s go-go records. Reviewing Attention Deficit, David Jeffries of allmusic remarked that Wale had a "post-Kanye, post-Lil Wayne, alternative-meets-hardcore style" and commented that Wale's single "Chillin'", which featured Lady Gaga, "crafts an instant floor-filler out of a sample from the 1969 hit 'Na Na Hey Hey Kiss Him Goodbye'".

== Personal life ==
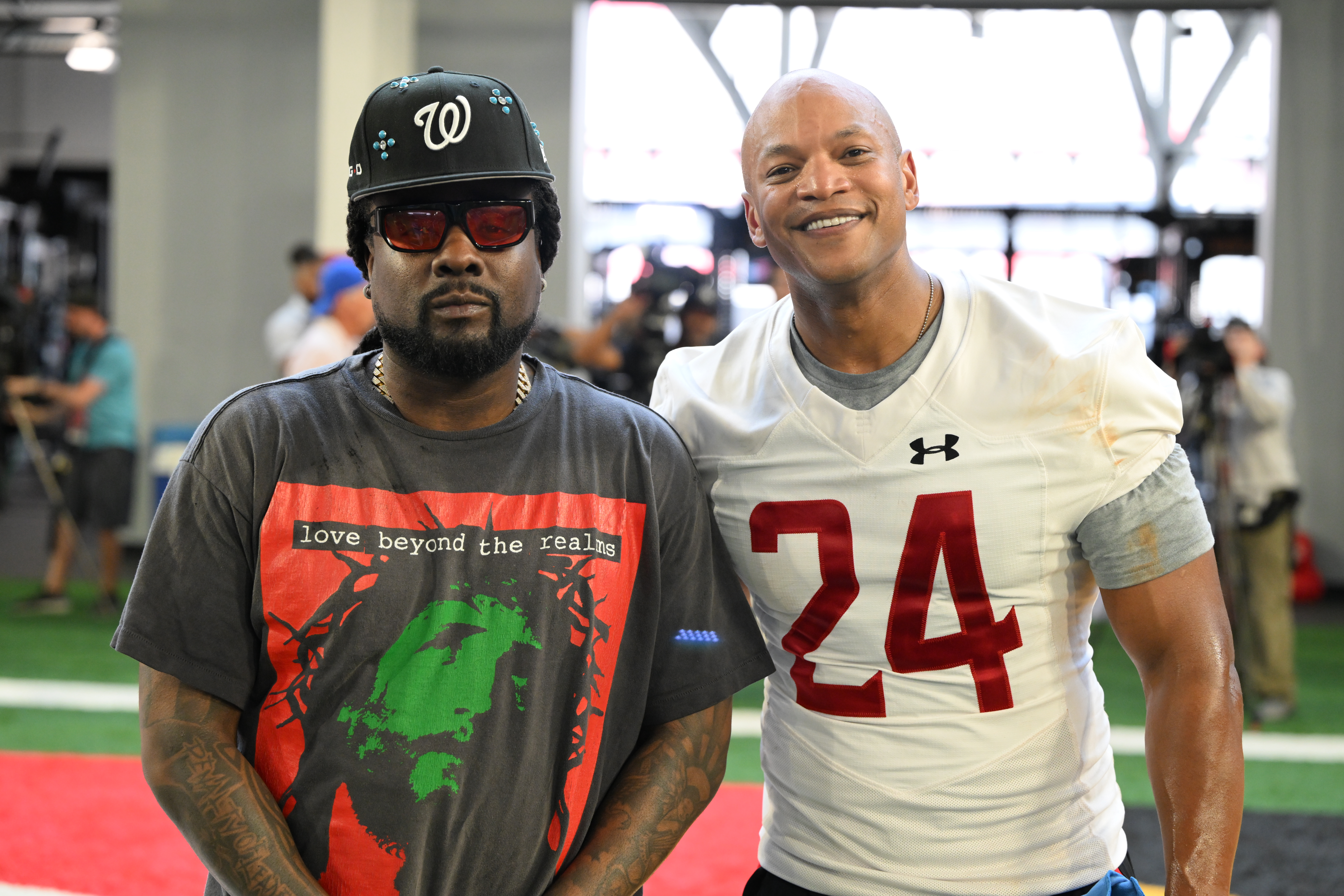
Wale and Maryland Governor Wes Moore at the Maryland Terrapins football training camp, 2024

Wale is a fan of the Washington Wizards and Washington Commanders. Also an avid professional wrestling fan, he has made several wrestling references on his songs. He hosts the annual WaleMania during WrestleMania weekend and has made several appearances on WWE television, where he hosted a rap battle between The New Day and The Usos on the July 4 episode of Smackdown Live in 2017, and was the guest commentator during Noam Dar and TJP's match on 205 Live in 2018. On October 2, 2019, Wale escorted former NXT Tag Team champions The Street Profits to the ring for their title shot versus champions Bobby Fish and Kyle O'Reilly. At WrestleMania 37, he escorted former Intercontinental Champion Big E to the ring versus champion Apollo Crews. Wale also performs Big E's new theme song as a singles competitor.

== Other ventures ==
Wale teamed up with Philadelphia retailer Ruvilla, and ASICS for a product called "Bottle Rocket" Asics Gel Lyte III in 2015. In 2016, he teamed with ASICS again with a product that features gold and shades of black and blue.

=== Television appearance ===
Wale portrays Chango in season 3 of American Gods.

== Discography ==
Studio albums

- Attention Deficit (2009)
- Ambition (2011)
- The Gifted (2013)
- The Album About Nothing (2015)
- Shine (2017)
- Wow... That's Crazy (2019)
- Folarin II (2021)
- Everything Is a Lot (2025)

== Awards and nominations ==
=== African Muzik Magazine Awards ===
Year	Nominee / work	Award	Result
2014	Wale	Best Male Diaspora	Nominated

=== BET Awards ===
Year	Nominee / work	Award	Result
2012	"Lotus Flower Bomb"	Viewer's Choice	Nominated
2012	"Lotus Flower Bomb"	Best Collaboration	Won
2014	"LoveHate Thing"	Centric Award	Nominated

=== BET Hip Hop Awards ===
Year	Nominee / work	Award	Result
2010	Wale	Best New Artist	Nominated
2011	"No Hands"	Best Collaboration	Nominated
2011	"No Hands"	Best Club Banger	Won
2012	"Lotus Flower Bomb"	Best Hip-Hop Video	Nominated
2012	"Lotus Flower Bomb"	Perfect Combo	Nominated
2013	Wale	Album Of The Year	Nominated
2013	Wale	Lyricist Of The Year	Nominated
2015	The Album About Nothing	Album of the Year	Nominated

=== Grammy Awards ===
Year	Nominee / work	Award	Result
2013	"Lotus Flower Bomb"	Best Rap Song	Nominated
2027	"Watching Us"	Best Melodic Rap Performance	Pending
2027	Everything Is a Lot.	Best Rap Album	Pending

=== MTV Video Music Awards ===
Year	Nominee / work	Award	Result
2015	"The White Shoes"	Best Video with a Social Message	Nominated

=== Nigeria Entertainment Awards ===
Year	Nominee / work	Award	Result
2010	Himself	Best International Artist	Won
2014	Himself	Diaspora Artist of the Year	Nominated

=== Soul Train Awards ===
Year	Nominee / work	Award	Result
2010	Wale	Best New Artist	Nominated
2012	"Lotus Flower Bomb"	Best Hip-Hop Song	Nominated
2012	"Lotus Flower Bomb"	Song of the Year	Nominated
2013	Bad (feat. Tiara Thomas)	Best Hip Hop Song of the Year	Won
