= Allido Records =

American record label and music company

- Parent company: Sony BMG
- Founded: 2004
- Founder: Mark Ronson, Rich Kleiman
- Distributor(s): J Records (2004–2011); Interscope Records (Wale releases)
- Genre: Various
- Country of origin: United States

Allido Records is a record label and production company co-founded by British DJ Mark Ronson and his manager, media executive Rich Kleiman in 2004 as an imprint of J Records, a division of Sony BMG. The label's name is derived from Stevie Wonder's 1980 song "All I Do".

Rapper Saigon was the first artist to sign with the label, but left in favor of Just Blaze's Fort Knox Entertainment. In conjunction with Clive Davis' J Records, Allido signed Chicago-based rapper Rhymefest, who is best known for having co-written Kanye West's 2004 single "Jesus Walks". He released his debut album, Blue Collar for the label in July 2006. In 2007, Ronson and Kleiman signed Washington, D.C.–based rapper Wale to a contract which entered a joint venture with Interscope Records in April of the following year. In 2008, the label signed Australian-born soul singer Daniel Merriweather.

The label was distributed by J Records until its dissolution in 2011, after which Allido became an independent label.

== Artists ==
- Daniel Merriweather
- The Rumblestrips
- Surreal
- Mark Ronson
- Wale

== See also ==
- List of record labels
