= Steve Lacy discography =

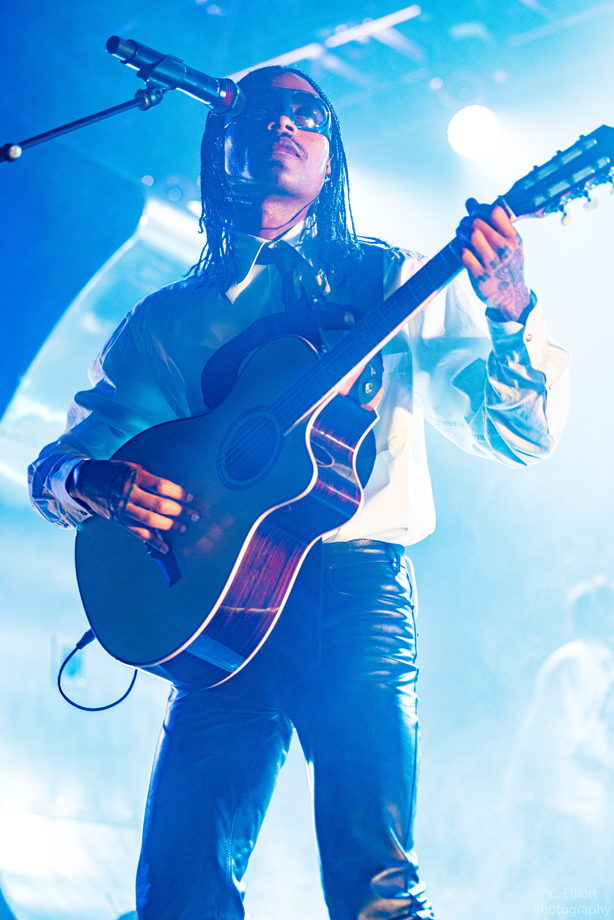
- Lacy in 2022
- Studio albums: 3
- EPs: 1
- Compilation albums: 1
- Singles: 25
- Promotional singles: 2

This article catalogs the songwriting, musician, and production credits for Steve Lacy-Moya, better known as Steve Lacy. Lacy began his career as a guitarist and producer for the Los Angeles-based R&B/soul band, the Internet, and as a solo artist in the mid-to-late 2010s. His debut project, a song series titled Steve Lacy's Demo, was released in February 2017 and his debut album, Apollo XXI, was released in May 2019.

== Albums ==
=== Studio albums ===
List of studio albums, with selected details and chart positions
Title	Album details	Peak chart positions										Certifications
Title	Album details	US	AUS	CAN	FRA	IRE	NZ	POR	SPA	SWI	UK	Certifications
Apollo XXI	Released: May 24, 2019; Label: Three Quarter, AWAL; Format: Digital download, streaming, CD, LP	160	—	—	— (Note: Apollo XXI did not enter the French Albums chart but peaked on the France Downloads Albums chart at number 115.)	—	—	—	—	—	—	
Gemini Rights	Released: July 20, 2022; Label: RCA; Format: Digital download, streaming, LP	7	13	10	151	41	7	32	98	42	47	BPI: Silver; RMNZ: Gold
Oh Yeah?	Released: July 17, 2026; Label: RCA; Format: Digital download, streaming, CD, LP	14	17	39	108	65	10	48	— (Note: Oh Yeah? did not enter the Spanish Top 100 Albums chart but peaked on the Spanish Top 100 Vinyl Albums chart at number 63.)	47	81	
"—" denotes a recording that did not chart or was not released in that territory.

=== Compilation albums ===
- The Lo-Fis (2020)

=== With the Internet ===
- Ego Death (2015)
- Hive Mind (2018)

== Extended plays ==
List of EPs, with selected details and chart positions
Title	EP details	Peak chart positions	Certifications
Title	EP details	US Indie	Certifications
Steve Lacy's Demo	Released: February 24, 2017; Label: 3Qtr, AWAL; Format: Digital download, streaming	41	RMNZ: Gold

== Singles ==
=== As lead artist ===
List of singles as lead artist
Title	Year	Peak chart positions										Certifications	Album
Title	Year	US	AUS	CAN	GRE	IRE	NLD	NZ	SWE	UK	WW	Certifications	Album
"C U Girl"	2015	—	—	—	—	—	—	—	—	—	—	BPI: Gold; RMNZ: Platinum	Non-album single
"Some"	2016	—	—	—	—	—	—	—	—	—	—	BPI: Gold; RMNZ: Platinum	Steve Lacy's Demo
"Dark Red"	2017	78	69	71	50	95	— (Note: "Dark Red" did not enter the Netherlands' Single Top 100 but peaked on the Netherlands' Single Tip Chart at number 22.)	—	—	— (Note: "Dark Red" did not enter the UK Singles Chart, but peaked at number 77 on the UK Streaming Chart.)	132	RIAA: Platinum; BPI: 2× Platinum; IFPI GRE: Gold; RMNZ: 3× Platinum	Steve Lacy's Demo
"Moron"	2017	—	—	—	—	—	—	—	—	—	—		Non-album singles
"4real"	2017	—	—	—	—	—	—	—	—	—	—		Non-album singles
"N Side"	2019	—	—	—	—	—	—	—	—	—	—	BPI: Silver; RMNZ: Gold	Apollo XXI
"Playground"	2019	—	—	—	—	—	—	—	—	—	—		Apollo XXI
"Hate CD"	2019	—	—	—	—	—	—	—	—	—	—		Apollo XXI
"Live Without Your Love" (with Love Regenerator)	2020	—	—	—	—	—	—	—	—	75	—		96 Months
"Mercury"	2022	— (Note: "Mercury" did not enter the Billboard Hot 100, but peaked at number 15 on the Bubbling Under Hot 100 Singles chart.)	—	—	—	—	—	— (Note: "Mercury" did not enter the NZ Top 40 Singles Chart, but peaked at number 22 on the NZ Hot Singles Chart.)	—	—	—		Gemini Rights
"Bad Habit"	2022	1	3	10	26	9	74	2	49	8	8	ARIA: 4× Platinum; BPI: 2× Platinum; GLF: Gold; IFPI GRE: Gold; MC: 2× Platinum; RMNZ: 4× Platinum	Gemini Rights
"Static"	2022	78	68	66	—	49	—	— (Note: "Static" did not enter the NZ Top 40 Singles Chart, but peaked at number eight on the NZ Hot Singles Chart.)	—	56	159	BPI: Silver; MC: Platinum; RMNZ: Platinum	Gemini Rights
"Sunshine" (featuring Fousheé)	2022	— (Note: "Sunshine" did not enter the Billboard Hot 100, but peaked at number seven on the Bubbling Under Hot 100 Singles chart.)	—	—	—	—	—	— (Note: "Sunshine" did not enter the NZ Top 40 Singles Chart, but peaked at number 12 on the NZ Hot Singles Chart.)	—	—	—		Gemini Rights
"Helmet"	2023	— (Note: "Helmet" did not enter the Billboard Hot 100, but peaked at number 24 on the Bubbling Under Hot 100 Singles chart.)	—	—	—	—	—	— (Note: "Helmet" did not enter the NZ Top 40 Singles Chart, but peaked at number 11 on the NZ Hot Singles Chart.)	—	—	—		Gemini Rights
"The Feeling"	2026	60	96	63	—	—	—	— (Note: "The Feeling" did not enter the NZ Top 40 Singles Chart, but peaked at number four on the NZ Hot Singles Chart.)	—	—	—		Oh Yeah?
"Oh Yeah?"	2026	19	13	22	—	22	— (Note: "Oh Yeah?" did not enter the Dutch Single Top 100 but peaked at number seven on the Dutch Single Tip chart.)	8	— (Note: "Oh Yeah?" did not enter the Swedish Singellista Chart, but peaked at number five on the Swedish Heatseeker Chart.)	23	18		Oh Yeah?
"—" denotes a recording that did not chart or was not released in that territory.

=== As featured artist ===
List of singles as a featured artist
Title	Year	Peak chart positions							Certifications	Album
Title	Year	US Bub.	US AAA	US R&B/ HH	US Rap DL	US Rock	NZ Heat	UK R&B	Certifications	Album
"Only Girl" (Kali Uchis featuring Steve Lacy and Vince Staples)	2016	—	—	—	—	—	—	—		Non-album single
"Dent Jusay" (Matt Martians featuring Syd and Steve Lacy)	2017	—	—	—	—	—	—	—		The Drum Chord Theory
"Scrood" (Jonti featuring Steve Lacy)	2017	—	—	—	—	—	—	—		Non-album single
"911 / Mr. Lonely" (Tyler, the Creator featuring Frank Ocean and Steve Lacy)	2017	1	—	47	17	—	3	39	RIAA: 2× Platinum; BPI: Silver	Flower Boy
"4 Leaf Clover" (Ravyn Lenae featuring Steve Lacy)	2018	—	—	—	—	—	—	—		Crush
"Just a Stranger" (Kali Uchis featuring Steve Lacy)	2018	—	—	—	—	—	—	—		Isolation
"Sunflower" (Vampire Weekend featuring Steve Lacy)	2019	—	25	—	—	24	—	—		Father of the Bride
"Black Qualls" (Thundercat featuring Steve Lacy and Steve Arrington)	2020	—	—	—	—	—	—	—		It Is What It Is
"Skin Tight" (Ravyn Lenae featuring Steve Lacy)	2022	—	—	— (Note: "Skin Tight" did not enter the Billboard Hot R&B/Hip-Hop Songs chart, but peaked at number 31 on the R&B/Hip-Hop Airplay chart.)	—	—	—	—		Hypnos
"—" denotes a recording that did not chart or was not released in that territory.

=== Promotional singles ===
List of promotional singles
Title	Year	Peak chart positions						Album
Title	Year	US	US Alt.	US R&B	US Rock	AUS R&B	NZ Hot	Album
"Nice Shoes"	2025	—	19	—	23	—	11	Oh Yeah?
"Is It Cool?" (featuring SZA)	2026	80	—	23	—	29	8	Oh Yeah?
"—" denotes a recording that did not chart or was not released in that territory.

== Other charted and certified songs ==
List of other charted and certified songs
Title	Year	Peak chart positions										Certifications	Album
Title	Year	US	US Alt.	US R&B	US Rock	AUS R&B	CAN	IRE	NZ	UK	WW	Certifications	Album
"Infrunami"	2020	—	—	—	—	—	—	—	—	—	—	BPI: Silver; RMNZ: Platinum	The Lo-Fis
"Buttons"	2022	—	17	23	25	—	—	—	—	—	—		Gemini Rights
"Amber"	2022	—	19	—	29	—	—	—	—	—	—		Gemini Rights
"Pure Colour" (featuring Erykah Badu)	2026	—	—	17	—	—	—	—	—	—	—		Oh Yeah?
"Show You Me"	2026	—	—	—	38	—	—	—	— (Note: "Show You Me" did not enter the NZ Top 40 Singles Chart, but peaked at number 13 on the NZ Hot Singles Chart.)	—	—		Oh Yeah?
"Doom"	2026	— (Note: "Doom" did not enter the Billboard Hot 100, but peaked at number 4 on the Bubbling Under Hot 100 Singles chart.)	—	11	27	37	—	—	— (Note: "Doom" did not enter the NZ Top 40 Singles Chart, but peaked at number 8 on the NZ Hot Singles Chart.)	—	—		Oh Yeah?
"Nothing"	2026	52	14	—	13	—	50	89	36	56	180		Oh Yeah?
"Lovesexdrugbomb" (featuring Cecile Believe)	2026	—	—	—	46	—	—	—	—	—	—		Oh Yeah?
"Nice Shoes / In Your World"	2026	—	—	—	45	—	—	—	—	—	—		Oh Yeah?
"—" denotes a recording that did not chart or was not released in that territory.

== Guest appearances ==
List of non-single guest appearances, with other performing artists, showing year released and album name
Title	Year	Artist(s)	Album
"Verbs"	2015	Peyton (of Milky Wayv)	The Best Mixtape You've Ever Heard
"If Tomorrow's Not Here"	2016	Denzel Curry, Twelve'len	Imperial
"Folding Clothes"	2016	J. Cole	4 Your Eyez Only
"Found Me Some Acid Tonight"	2017	Matt Martians	The Drum Chord Theory
"Dollar Bills"	2017	Syd	Fin
"Worries"	2017	Chloe x Halle	The Two of Us
"Some Girl"	2017	GoldLink	At What Cost
"Pride"	2017	Kendrick Lamar, Anna Wise, Bēkon	Damn
"Fungus"	2017	TRU., K. Solar, Scott Kelley	The Leimert Park Project
"Mangosteen"	2017	C&T	Loud
"Glitter"	2017	Tyler, the Creator	Flower Boy
"Computer Luv"	2018	Ravyn Lenae	Crush
"Out of Your League"	2018	Blood Orange	Negro Swan
"Exit Scott (interlude)"	2019	Solange	When I Get Home
"Flower Moon"	2019	Vampire Weekend	Father of the Bride

== Writing discography ==
Year	Main artist	Album	Song	Additional writer(s)
2015	Steve Lacy	Non-album single	"C U Girl"	
2015	The Internet	Ego Death	12. "Palace / Curse" (featuring Lacy and Tyler, The Creator)	"Palace": Tyler Okonma; Sydney Bennett; "Curse": Bennett; Green
2016	Denzel Curry	Imperial	"If Tomorrow's Not Here"(featuring Twelve'Len)	Curry; LaVares Joseph
2016	Twenty88	Twenty88	2. "Selfish"	Sean Anderson; Jhené Chilombo; Marcos Palacios; Ernest Clark; Ronald "Flippa" Colson; Jameel Roberts; Jan-ai El-Goni; Matan Zohar
2016	Isaiah Rashad	The Sun's Tirade	8. "Silkk da Shocka" (featuring Syd)	Isaiah McClain; Sydney Bennett
2017	Matt Martians	The Drum Chord Theory	2. "What Love Is"	Matthew Martin; Sydney Bennett
2017	Matt Martians	The Drum Chord Theory	9. "Dent Jusay" (featuring Syd and Lacy)	Matthew Martin; Sydney Bennett
2017	Matt Martians	The Drum Chord Theory	6. "Found Me Some Acid Tonight" (featuring Lacy)	Martin
2017	Syd	Fin	10. "Dollar Bills" (featuring Lacy)	Bennett; Ronny "Flip" Colson
2017	Steve Lacy	Steve Lacy's Demo	All tracks	
2017	Steve Lacy	Non-album single	"Moron"	Sydney Bennett
2017	Steve Lacy	Non-album single	"4real"	
2017	Chloe x Halle	The Two of Us	8. "Worries"	Chloe Bailey; Halle Bailey
2017	GoldLink	At What Cost	13. "Some Girl" (featuring Lacy)	D'Anthony Carlos; Taz Arnold
2017	Kendrick Lamar	Damn	7. "Pride"	Kendrick Duckworth; Anna Wise; Anthony Tiffith
2017	C&T	Loud	4. "Mangosteen" (featuring Lacy)	T'Challa
2018	Ravyn Lenae	Crush	All Tracks	Ravyn Lenae; Christopher Smith (3. "Computer Luv")
2018	Kali Uchis	Isolation	3. "Just a Stranger" (featuring Steve Lacy)	Kali Uchis; Romil Hemnani
2018	The Internet	Hive Mind	1. "Come Together"	Sydney Bennett
2018	The Internet	Hive Mind	4. "La Di Da"	Sydney Bennett
2018	The Internet	Hive Mind	5. "Stay the Night"	Sydney Bennett
2018	The Internet	Hive Mind	7. "Mood"	Sydney Bennett
2018	The Internet	Hive Mind	11. "Wanna Be"	Sydney Bennett
2018	The Internet	Hive Mind	2. "Roll (Burbank Funk)"	Bennett; Patrick Paige II; Thorir Baldursson; Mats Bjoerklund; Jürgen Korduletsch
2018	The Internet	Hive Mind	8. "Next Time" / "Humble Pie"	Bennett; Nick Green; Iman
2018	The Internet	Hive Mind	9. "It Gets Better (With Time)"	Bennett; Smith
2018	The Internet	Hive Mind	10. "Look What U Started"	Bennett; Green
2018	The Internet	Hive Mind	12. "Beat Goes On"	Matthew Martin
2018	The Internet	Hive Mind	13. "Hold On"	Bennett; Smith; Nicholas Bennett
2018	Mac Miller	Swimming	11. "Jet Fuel"	M. McCormick; D. Natche; C. Lane; P. Thomas; J. MacGillivray
2018	Blood Orange	Negro Swan	14. "Out of Your League" (featuring Lacy)	Devonté Hynes
2019	Solange	When I Get Home	16. "Exit Scott (interlude)"	Knowles; Giovanni Cortez; Charles Simmons Jr.
2019	Steve Lacy	Apollo XXI	All tracks	Jesse Boykins III (3. "Playground")

Notes

- "Verbs" features background vocals by Steve Lacy.
- "If Tomorrow's Not Here" features additional vocals by Steve Lacy.
- "Moron" was cut from Steve Lacy's Demo but was later self-released for free on April 1, 2017.
- "Pride" features background vocals from Anna Wise, Steve Lacy, and additional vocals from Bēkon. Bēkon is listed as additional producer.
- "Sticky" and "Closer (Ode 2 U)", from Crush, feature background vocals from Steve Lacy.
- "Come Together" feature lead and background vocals from Syd and Steve Lacy, as well as background vocals from Nick Green and Durand Bernarr.
- "Roll (Burbank Funk)" and "La Di Da" feature lead and background vocals from Syd and Steve Lacy, as well as background vocals from Nick Green.
- "Mood", "Next Time"/"Humble Pie", "Look What U Started", and "Wanna Be" feature background vocals from Steve Lacy.
- "Beat Goes On" features lead and background vocals from Steve Lacy and Matt Martians, as well as background vocals from Marcus Lee.

== Production discography ==
Year	Artist	Album	Songs	Other producer(s)
2015	Steve Lacy	Non-album single	"C U Girl"	
2015	The Internet	Ego Death	1. "Get Away"	Matt Martians
2015	The Internet	Ego Death	2. "Gabby" (featuring Janelle Monáe)	Matt Martians
2015	The Internet	Ego Death	8. "Special Affair"	Matt Martians
2015	The Internet	Ego Death	9. "Something's Missing"	Matt Martians
2015	The Internet	Ego Death	3. "Under Control"	The Internet
2015	The Internet	Ego Death	5. "Just Sayin'" / "I Tried"	"Just Sayin'": Christopher Allan Smith; "I Tried": Bambaata; Smith
2015	The Internet	Ego Death	11. "Penthouse Cloud"	The Highlights; Martians
2015	The Internet	Ego Death	12. "Palace" / "Curse" (featuring Tyler, The Creator and Steve Lacy)	"Palace": Tyler, The Creator; "Curse":
2015	Peyton (of Milky Wayv)	The Best Mixtape You've Ever Heard	4. "Verbs"	
2016	Denzel Curry	Imperial	10. "If Tomorrow's Not Here" (featuring Twelve'Len)	
2016	Twenty88	TWENTY88	2. "Selfish"	Ronald "Flip" Colson
2016	Isaiah Rashad	The Sun's Tirade	8. "Silkk da Shocka" (featuring Syd)	
2016	J. Cole	4 Your Eyez Only	8. "Folding Clothes"	J. Cole; Elite; Ron Gilmore
2017	Matt Martians	The Drum Chord Theory	2. "What Love Is"	
2017	Matt Martians	The Drum Chord Theory	5. "Southern Isolation"	Martians
2017	Matt Martians	The Drum Chord Theory	6. "Found Me Some Acid Tonight" (featuring Steve Lacy)	Martians
2017	Matt Martians	The Drum Chord Theory	11. "Diamond In Da Ruff"	Martians
2017	Syd	Fin	4. "All About Me"	
2017	Syd	Fin	10. "Dollar Bills" (featuring Steve Lacy)	Ronald "Flip" Colson
2017	Syd	Non-album single	"Treading Water"	Ronald "Flip" Colson
2017	Steve Lacy	Steve Lacy's Demo	All tracks	
2017	Steve Lacy	Non-album single	"Moron"	
2017	Steve Lacy	Non-album single	"4real"	
2017	Chloe x Halle	The Two of Us	8. "Worries"	Chloe; Halle
2017	Jonti	Non-album single	"Scrood" (featuring Steve Lacy)	Jonti; Moses MacRae; Jo Ling; James Domeyko
2017	GoldLink	At What Cost	13. "Some Girl" (featuring Steve Lacy)	Taz Arnold
2017	Kendrick Lamar	Damn	7. "Pride"	Anthony Tiffith; Bēkon
2017	TRU	The Leimert Park Project	5. "Fungus" (featuring K. Solar, Scott Kelley & Steve Lacy)	
2017	C&T	Loud	4. "Mangosteen" (featuring Steve Lacy)	Christopher A. Smith; T'Challa
2017	The Jet Age of Tomorrow	God's Poop or Clouds?	1. "Summer Is Ending"	Martians; Pyramid Vritra; Paige II
2017	The Jet Age of Tomorrow	God's Poop or Clouds?	10. "1 a.m"	Martians; Pyramid Vritra; Paige II
2017	The Jet Age of Tomorrow	God's Poop or Clouds?	4. "The Jaunt"	Martians; Vritra
2017	The Jet Age of Tomorrow	God's Poop or Clouds?	9. "Chance" (feat. India Shawn & MarkUsFree)	Martians; Vritra
2017	The Jet Age of Tomorrow	God's Poop or Clouds?	15. "Come On With Me Gurl"	Martians; Vritra; Murdock; Isis V.
2018	Ravyn Lenae	Crush	All Tracks (also exec.)	3. "Computer Luv": Christopher Smith
2018	Kali Uchis	Isolation	3. "Just a Stranger" (feat. Steve Lacy)	Romil Hemnani
2018	The Internet	Hive Mind	1. "Come Together"	Christopher Smith; Matt Martians; Patrick Paige II; Moonchild
2018	The Internet	Hive Mind	2. "Roll (Burbank Funk)"	Paige II; Gaz
2018	The Internet	Hive Mind	3. "Come Over"	Martians
2018	The Internet	Hive Mind	4. "La Di Da"	Paige II; Moonchild
2018	The Internet	Hive Mind	5. "Stay The Night"	Paige II; Martians; Smith
2018	The Internet	Hive Mind	11. "Wanna Be"	Paige II; Martians; Smith
2018	The Internet	Hive Mind	6. "Bravo"	Bennett; Martians
2018	The Internet	Hive Mind	7. "Mood"	Martians; Moonchild
2018	The Internet	Hive Mind	8. "Next Time"/"Humble Pie"	Martians; Paige II
2018	The Internet	Hive Mind	9. "It Gets Better (With Time)"	Martians; Paige II
2018	The Internet	Hive Mind	12. "Beat Goes On"	Martians; Paige II
2018	The Internet	Hive Mind	10. "Look What U Started"	
2018	The Internet	Hive Mind	13. "Hold On"	Martians; Moonchild; Kari Faux
2018	Mac Miller	Swimming	11. "Jet Fuel"	DJ Dahi; Larry Fisherman
2018	QUADRY	Malik Ruff	"1:04 PM"	
2019	Solange	When I Get Home	11. "My Skin My Logo"	John Carroll Kirby; John Key; Jamire Williams; Knowles; Tyler, the Creator
2019	Solange	When I Get Home	16. "Exit Scott (interlude)"	Standing on the Corner; Key; Knowles
2019	Matt Martians	The Last Party	3. "Movin On"	
2019	Matt Martians	The Last Party	5. "Pony Fly" (feat. Steve Lacy)	Mac Demarco; Martians
2019	Matt Martians	The Last Party	6. "Southern Isolation 2"	Martians; CSmith
2019	Vampire Weekend	Father of the Bride	10. "My Mistake"	Ariel Rechtshaid; Ezra Koenig; DJ Dahi; Buddy Ross
2019	Vampire Weekend	Father of the Bride	12. "Sunflower" (feat. Steve Lacy)	Rechtshaid; Koenig
2019	Vampire Weekend	Father of the Bride	13."Flower Moon" (feat. Steve Lacy)	Rechtshaid; Koenig
2019	Steve Lacy	Apollo XXI	All tracks	
2020	Thundercat	It Is What It Is	4. "Black Qualls" (feat. Steve Lacy, Steve Arrington and Childish Gambino)	Thundercat; Flying Lotus; Mono/Poly
2020	Steve Lacy	The Lo-Fis	All tracks	

Notes

- "Verbs" features background vocals by Steve Lacy.
- "If Tomorrow's Not Here" features additional vocals by Steve Lacy.
- "Foldin Clothes" feature talk-box by Irvin Washington, background vocals by Steve Lacy, and additional background vocals by T.S. Desandies and Brittany Carter.
- "Worries" features background vocals by Steve Lacy.
- "Treading Water" was cut from Syd's debut album Fin and contains the same instrumental as Twenty88's "Selfish" from their 2016 self-titled debut. It was self-released for free on March 27, 2017.
- "Moron" was cut from Steve Lacy's Demo but was later self-released for free on April 1, 2017.
- "Pride" features background vocals from Anna Wise, Steve Lacy, and additional vocals from Bēkon. Bēkon is listed as additional producer.
- "Sticky" and "Closer (Ode 2 U)", from Crush, feature background vocals from Steve Lacy.
- "Come Together" feature lead and background vocals from Syd and Steve Lacy, as well as background vocals from Nick Green and Durand Bernarr.
- "Roll (Burbank Funk)" and "La Di Da" feature lead and background vocals from Syd and Steve Lacy, as well as background vocals from Nick Green.
- "Come Over" features lead and background vocals from Syd and Steve Lacy.
- "Mood", "Next Time"/"Humble Pie", "Look What U Started", and "Wanna Be" feature background vocals from Steve Lacy.
- "Beat Goes On" features lead and background vocals from Steve Lacy and Matt Martians, as well as background vocals from Marcus Lee.

== Music videos ==
Year	Title	Director(s)	Album
2016	"Some"	Matthew Castellanos	Steve Lacy's Demo
2017	"Ryd / Dark Red"	Matthew Castellanos	Steve Lacy's Demo
2019	"Outro Freestyle"	Alexis Zabe	Apollo XXI
2019	"Playground"	Alexis Zabe	Apollo XXI
2022	"Mercury"	Rubberband	Gemini Rights
2022	"Bad Habit"	Julian Klincewicz	Gemini Rights
2022	"Sunshine"	Rubberband	Gemini Rights
2026	"the feeling"	Matthew Castellanos	Oh yeah?
2026	"doom"	Bing Cao & Riley Pascal	Oh yeah?

List of videos as a featured artist
Year	Title	Main Artist	Director(s)	Album
2016	"Only Girl" (featuring Lacy and Vince Staples)	Kali Uchis	Kali Uchis; Cory Bailey; Valentine Street	Non-album single
2017	"Dent Jusay (featuring Syd and Lacy)	Matt Martians	Matt Martians; Justin Brown	The Drum Chord Theory
2017	"Scrood" (featuring Lacy)	Jonti	Daniel 'O Toole	Non-album single
2018	"Just a Stranger" (featuring Lacy)	Kali Uchis	BRTHR	Isolation
2019	"Sunflower" (feat. Lacy)	Vampire Weekend	Jonah Hill	Father of the Bride
