= Dark Red (disambiguation) =

Dark Red is a shade of maroon.

Dark Red may also refer to:

- Dark Red (album), by Shlohmo, 2015
- "Dark Red", a 2017 song by Steve Lacy
- The Dark Red, a 2018 American independent mystery thriller film
