= Static (Steve Lacy song) =

Single by Steve Lacy

from the album Gemini Rights
- Released: July 8, 2022
- Genre: R&B; pop; funk
- Length: 2:36
- Label: RCA
- Songwriters: Steve Lacy; John Kirby
- Producer: Steve Lacy

Steve Lacy singles chronology
"Bad Habit" (2022)	"Static" (2022)	"Sunshine" (2022)

"Static" is a song recorded by the American musician Steve Lacy. It was the third released single from his second studio album, Gemini Rights, on July 8, 2022.

In 2024, the song became popular on TikTok after a video of a TikToker that says "English or Spanish": when the responder says "English", the TikToker will say "whoever moves first, is gay", and the responder is pranked while the music plays, while the Spanish response features a Spanish translation.

== Background ==
In an interview with W, Steve Lacy said:

That song's about going through a breakup and not trying to run away from the pain of it. "New boyfriend ain't gonna fill the void" is kind of like saying, a rebound isn't gonna help. You can't just put a Band-Aid on it. I'm not gonna run away from the pain. I'm about to feel this shit.

== Charts ==
Weekly chart performance for "Static"
Chart (2022–2023)	Peak position
Australia (ARIA)	68
Canada Hot 100 (Billboard)	66
Global 200 (Billboard)	159
Ireland (IRMA)	49
UK Singles (Official Charts)	56
UK Hip Hop/R&B (Official Charts)	23
US Billboard Hot 100	78
US Hot R&B/Hip-Hop Songs (Billboard)	22
US Hot Rock & Alternative Songs (Billboard)	10

== Certifications ==
Certifications for "Static"
Region	Certification	Certified units/sales
Canada (Music Canada)	Platinum	80,000^{‡}
New Zealand (RMNZ)	Platinum	30,000^{‡}
United Kingdom (BPI)	Silver	200,000^{‡}
^{‡} Sales+streaming figures based on certification alone.
