= Is It Cool? =

Promotional single by Steve Lacy featuring SZA

from the album Oh Yeah?
- Released: June 26, 2026
- Genre: R&B; soul
- Length: 2:54
- Label: RCA; L-M
- Songwriters: Steve Lacy; Solána Rowe; Matthew Castellanos; Brittany Fousheé
- Producers: Steve Lacy; Matt Martians; Karl Wingate

Audio
- "Is It Cool?" on YouTube

"Is It Cool?" is a song by American musician Steve Lacy featuring American singer-songwriter SZA. It was released on June 26, 2026, as a promotional single from Lacy's third studio album, Oh Yeah? (2026).

== Background ==
In 2022, Steve Lacy began work on his third studio album, Oh Yeah? Announcing it to Rolling Stone in his 2025 cover story, Lacy said that the songwriting was more personal and purposeful than that of his previous works, which were based primarily on making a catchy hook. Jeff Ihaza, the cover story's author, revealed that the album explored Lacy's "relationship to love and trust" with the "occasionally devastating style of observation he's built a career on."

Following a string of 2025 collaborations, (Note: "IRL" with Lizzo, "Take Me Dancing" with Doja Cat, "PT Cruiser" with Moruf, and "Girl, Get Up" with Doechii) SZA told i-D in 2026 that she and Lacy had made "a random little project" together. He had been joining her during some recording sessions for her upcoming music, which she described as "awesome humanity shit" that makes her "feel insufferably human". On June 25 later that year, Lacy announced the artists featured on Oh Yeah?, revealing SZA was one of them. They had worked on a song titled "Is It Cool?"

== Music and lyrics ==
"Is It Cool?" is an R&B and soul song, with some elements of funk music. The production is built around a soft guitar line, as well as a beat that Stereogum's Margaret Farrell wrote was reminiscent of a ticking clock. SZA delivers a subdued vocal performance, providing vocal harmonies and contributing to the second verse and outro. The song also features backing vocals from Fousheé and Ravyn Lenae.

The song is about developing trust in a romantic relationship. Its lyrics discuss infidelity, non-commitment, and emotional immaturity. "Is It Cool?" opens with Lacy singing about cheating multiple on times on a partner, despite self-promises about being a more committed person. He calls the behavior self-sabotage, and he confesses that his father's death negatively affected his experiences with love, citing it as a reason for his infidelity. He refers to his father as tatay in Tagalog in the improvised opening verse, which was so poignant that it surprised even Lacy himself while in the studio, as well as Fousheé and producer Matt Martians. Lacy explains to his partner: "I never learned to love properly / The mind be playing tricks when the heart's involved." SZA, in the second verse, replies from the partner's perspective that they should destress and have sex instead of worrying about their trust issues. She sings: "Being vulnerable is exhausting, babe / Can we get naked instead of talking, babe? / I ain't trippin', we both got options, babe."

Throughout the song, Lacy convinces the romantic partner to stay despite breaking their trust. He explains that since life is short and they could die any day, their relationship is still worth continuing. Lacy sings: "You ain't gotta trust me to love me, baby / 'Cause I don’t even trust myself." As the song progresses, he realizes that he should have more faith in himself, with the closing lyric being "Maybe I should trust myself."

== Release ==
"Is It Cool?" was released on June 26, 2026, as a promotional single from Oh Yeah? It follows the album's first promotional single, "Nice Shoes" (2025), and lead single "The Feeling" (2026).

Music critics wrote positively about "Is It Cool?". Some praised the chemistry between Lacy and SZA, saying that the two complemented each other well. HotNewHipHop's Alexander Cole found "Is It Cool?" cohesive and wrote that "the performances [by SZA and Lacy were] exactly what they needed to be". Stereogum's Farrell said that "SZA's satiny vocals weave nicely into the song" and also praised the lyrics, highlighting Lacy's candid songwriting.

== Personnel ==
Adapted from Tidal

- Steve Lacy – lead vocals, songwriting, production
- Solána Rowe (SZA) – lead vocals, songwriting
- Matthew Castellanos – songwriting, executive production
- Brittany Fousheé (Fousheé) – background vocals, songwriting
- Ravyn Lenae – background vocals
- Matt Martians – production
- Karl Wingate – production
- Michael Uzowuru – arrangement
- Caleb Laven – engineering
- Guillaume Panloup – engineering
- Jacob Johnston – engineering
- Sean Matsukawa – engineering
- Jon Castelli – mixing
- Ruairi O'Flaherty – mastering

== Charts ==
Chart performance for "Is It Cool?"
Chart (2026)	Peak position
Australia Hip Hop/R&B (ARIA)	29
New Zealand Hot Singles (RMNZ)	8
US Billboard Hot 100	80
US Hot R&B/Hip-Hop Songs (Billboard)	23
