= C U Girl =

Single by Steve Lacy
- Released: February 15, 2015
- Length: 2:09
- Label: L-M
- Songwriter: Steve Lacy
- Producer: Steve Lacy

Steve Lacy singles chronology
"C U Girl" (2015)	"Some" (2016)

"C U Girl" is the debut single written, produced, and performed by American singer-songwriter Steve Lacy. It was released on February 15, 2015, by L-M Records.

== Composition ==
The "woozy, laidback" song sees Lacy "charming his love interest with a tell-it-like-it-is sentiment" before "explaining that his talent means that he simply can't stick around". Halfway through, the song flips itself and plays in reverse.

== Critical reception ==
Debbie Ijaduola of Clash said, "With heavy indie influences with a speckle of R&B, if anyone was still questioning who Steve Lacy was, this serves as a substantial example of Steve's signature style." Molly Dolan of Audacy said, "This simple and sweet song features Lacy's best qualities: his ability to write catchy lyrics over a bouncy guitar line."

Michele Johnson of Classic Rock History rated it as Lacy's fourth best song, and said, "This song might remind you of someone you can't be with for one reason or another. The music is mellow. It will have you tapping your foot to the beat. This is a track you will want to play when your long-distance lover is back in your arms. Steve Lacy's vocals are fire. He never misses a beat while he is singing. He takes a chance on his vocals by singing in a different key. His double has grit in his voice."

== Other uses ==
=== Live performances ===
Lacy included "C U Girl" on the set list of his 2022 North American tour, entitled the Give You the World Tour.

=== In popular culture ===
The song is featured in the 2025 video game Tony Hawk's Pro Skater 3 + 4.

== Certifications ==
Certifications for "C U Girl"
Region	Certification	Certified units/sales
New Zealand (RMNZ)	Platinum	30,000^{‡}
United Kingdom (BPI)	Gold	400,000^{‡}
^{‡} Sales+streaming figures based on certification alone.
