= Gemini Rights =

Studio album by Steve Lacy
- Released: July 15, 2022
- Studio: The Village
- Genres: R&B; funk; psychedelia
- Length: 34:57
- Label: RCA
- Producers: Steve Lacy; Matt Martians; DJ Dahi

Steve Lacy chronology
Apollo XXI (2019)	Gemini Rights (2022)	Oh Yeah? (2026)

Singles from Gemini Rights
- 1. "Mercury" Released: June 16, 2022; 2. "Bad Habit" Released: June 29, 2022; 3. "Static" Released: July 8, 2022; 4. "Sunshine" Released: July 13, 2022; 5. "Helmet" Released: February 13, 2023

Gemini Rights is the second studio album and major-label debut by American musician Steve Lacy. It was released on July 15, 2022, by RCA Records, as the follow-up to his debut album Apollo XXI (2019). The album incorporates elements of indie rock, alternative R&B, funk, jazz, and psychedelic music, and features guest appearances from Fousheé and Matt Martians of the Internet.

Preceded by the singles "Mercury", "Bad Habit", and "Sunshine", the album received positive reviews from critics. "Bad Habit" became Lacy's first entry and first number-one single on the Billboard Hot 100. Gemini Rights reached the top ten of the Billboard 200 and topped the Top Rock Albums chart. It won the Grammy Award for Best Progressive R&B Album at the 65th Grammy Awards.

== Background ==
Lacy produced "about 90% of the record" and came up with the title while "tipsy" at a bar, also telling Zane Lowe that he wanted Gemini Rights to be concise so listeners could "make a decision to want to keep playing it again". Lacy shared that the album is a collective story of him "coming into [himself] after a breakup." He hoped the album is left to be interpreted by people "[however] they want to." Gemini Rights is an album that amplifies the artist's "majestic mystique" discography, leading Lacy to hit the number-one on Billboard Hot 100 for three weeks straight, months following the summer release date in 2022. Gemini Rights is an album that Lacy hopes "will make people feel more unconditional love for one another."

== Critical reception ==
Professional ratings
Aggregate scores
Source	Rating
Metacritic	80/100
Review scores
Source	Rating
AllMusic	4/5 stars
Clash	7/10
The Guardian	5/5 stars
Hot Press	8/10
Loud and Quiet	6/10
The Music	4.5/5 stars
NME	4/5 stars
Pitchfork	7.1/10
Rolling Stone	4/5 stars

Gemini Rights received a score of 80 out of 100, based on eight critics' reviews, at review aggregator Metacritic, indicating "generally positive reviews". Mankaprr Conteh of Rolling Stone wrote that the album "feels like the product of a grand jam session" and a "tight collection of rock and R&B, funk and jazz, psych and hip-hop that's as warm and airy as the cusp of summer, when Geminis are born". Reviewing the album for NME, Thomas Smith found Lacy's "musical palette is more refined and vibrant than ever", describing the album as a "fearlessly funky" and "seriously steamy" follow-up with "bold leaps forward and artistic flourishes" that is a "more polished and assured work than his debut".

Shahzaib Hussain stated that Lacy "taps into the legacy of The Love Below-era André 3000" as he "channels the musical touchstones of yesteryear into something reachable for a generation exploring more than ever before concepts of personal autonomy and identity", although "the heady high of hedonism" offered by the album "is only ever fleeting and it never really fills the void". Luke Cartledge of Loud and Quiet acknowledged that the album is "not without flaws: occasionally, the lozenge-smooth nature of the production allows some tracks to drift into coffee-table politeness" and "easygoing groove or pseudo-improv [...] But such shortcomings are easily forgiven; the self-assurance of Steve Lacy is far from unearned".

== Track listing ==
Gemini Rights track listing
No.	Title	Writer(s)	Length
1.	"Static"	Steve Lacy; John Kirby	2:36
2.	"Helmet"	Lacy; Diana Gordon	3:21
3.	"Mercury"	Lacy; Britanny Fousheé; Dacoury Natche; Ely Rise	4:55
4.	"Buttons"	Lacy; Natche; Rise	3:04
5.	"Bad Habit"	Lacy; Fousheé; Gordon; Kirby; Matthew Castellanos	3:52
6.	"2Gether (Enterlude)" (with Matt Martians)	Lacy; Matthew Martin; Kirby	0:50
7.	"Cody Freestyle"	Lacy; Fousheé	4:00
8.	"Amber"	Lacy	2:53
9.	"Sunshine" (featuring Fousheé)	Lacy; Fousheé; Karriem Riggins	4:53
10.	"Give You the World"	Lacy; Natche; Rise	4:33
Total length:			34:57

== Personnel ==
Musicians

- Steve Lacy – vocals (all tracks), bass (3, 5), guitar (3 and all tracks, uncredited)
- Ely Rise – keyboards (1), piano (2), synthesizer (3, 4)
- Asia Lacy – background vocals (2, 8, 10)
- Vage Webb – background vocals (2, 8, 10)
- Valerie Lacy – background vocals (2, 8, 10)
- Valyn Spottsville – background vocals (2, 8, 10)
- Crystal Torres – horn (3)
- John Carroll Kirby – organ (3), synthesizer (5–10)
- Karriem Riggins – drums (9)
- Denise Stoudmire – background vocals (10)

Technical

- Steve Lacy – production (1–5, 7–10)
- Matt Martians – production (6), miscellaneous production (3, 4)
- DJ Dahi – co-production (4, 10), miscellaneous production (3)
- Mike Bozzi – mastering
- Neal Pogue – mixing
- Karl Wingate – engineering

== Charts ==
=== Weekly charts ===
Weekly chart performance for Gemini Rights
Chart (2022–2023)	Peak position
Australian Albums (ARIA)	13
Belgian Albums (Ultratop Flanders)	104
Belgian Albums (Ultratop Wallonia)	164
Canadian Albums (Billboard)	10
Finnish Albums (Suomen virallinen lista)	32
French Albums (SNEP)	161
Irish Albums (Official Charts)	41
Lithuanian Albums (AGATA)	4
New Zealand Albums (RMNZ)	7
Norwegian Albums (VG-lista)	13
Portuguese Albums (AFP)	47
Scottish Albums (Official Charts)	45
Spanish Albums (Promusicae)	98
Swedish Albums (Sverigetopplistan)	27
Swiss Albums (Schweizer Hitparade)	42
UK Albums (Official Charts)	47
US Billboard 200	7
US Top Alternative Albums (Billboard)	1
US Top R&B/Hip-Hop Albums (Billboard)	3
US Top Rock Albums (Billboard)	1
US Indie Store Album Sales (Billboard)	2

=== Year-end charts ===
2022 year-end chart performance for Gemini Rights
Chart (2022)	Position
Lithuanian Albums (AGATA)	32
US Billboard 200	140
US Top R&B/Hip-Hop Albums (Billboard)	46
US Top Rock Albums (Billboard)	19

2023 year-end chart performance for Gemini Rights
Chart (2023)	Position
US Billboard 200	117
US Top R&B/Hip-Hop Albums (Billboard)	51
US Top Rock Albums (Billboard)	17

== Certifications ==
Certifications for Gemini Rights
Region	Certification	Certified units/sales
New Zealand (RMNZ)	Gold	7,500^{‡}
United Kingdom (BPI)	Silver	60,000^{‡}
^{‡} Sales+streaming figures based on certification alone.
