= Oh Yeah? (song) =

Single by Steve Lacy

from the album Oh Yeah?
- Released: August 18, 2026
- Genre: Dream pop; synth-wave
- Length: 2:50
- Label: RCA
- Songwriters: Steve Lacy; Matthew Castellanos
- Producers: Steve Lacy; Michael Uzowuru

Steve Lacy singles chronology
"The Feeling" (2026)	"Oh Yeah?" (2026)

Visualizer
- "Oh Yeah?" on YouTube

"Oh Yeah?" is a song by American musician Steve Lacy. It was released on July 17, 2026, as the opening track of Lacy's third studio album, Oh Yeah? (2026). Following its inclusion in the end credits to Spider-Man: Brand New Day, the song gained commercial success, charting in Australia, New Zealand, the United Kingdom, and the United States on the Billboard Hot 100. "Oh Yeah?" impacted pop radio in the US on August 18, 2026, as the album's second single.

== Background and composition ==
On July 17, 2026, Lacy released his third studio album, Oh Yeah?, with "Oh Yeah?" serving as its opening and title track. It was featured in the end credits of the film Spider-Man: Brand New Day (2026), which contributed to the song's subsequent commercial success. "Oh Yeah?" impacted pop radio in the US on August 18, 2026, as the album's second single.

Described as an "80s-style buzzing synth track" and "timid and existential", the song combines Lacy's signature "classic guitar and drumbeat combo" with sparse lyrics and subdued vocals that make the arrangement "feel full". It gradually builds in intensity before returning to a "lulling repetition". Near the end, the track abruptly cuts off, followed by electric guitar and piano. The lyrics revolve around existentialism, with Lacy questioning the purpose of life while being accompanied by "electric guitar riffs" that create a "psychedelic pop-rock architecture."

== Critical reception ==
Writing for Stereogum, Chris DeVille compared the song's "indie synth-psych sounds" to those of bands such as MGMT, a style popularized in the late 2000s and early 2010s, citing the song's opening "keyboard notes" as evidence. DeVille described the track as "anthemic". In a more critical review for Pitchfork, Alphonse Pierre described "Oh Yeah?" as a "synthy dream-pop intro" addressing "serious" themes as Lacy "pick[s] himself up out of the dumps", but criticized the song for having "no personality".

== Charts ==
Chart performance for "Oh Yeah?"
Chart (2026)	Peak position
Australia (ARIA)	13
Australia Hip Hop/R&B (ARIA)	2
Canada Hot 100 (Billboard)	22
Canada CHR/Top 40 (Billboard)	34
Canada Modern Rock (Billboard Canada)	30
Colombia Anglo Airplay (Monitor Latino)	15
Estonia Airplay (TopHit)	92
Global 200 (Billboard)	18
Ireland (IRMA)	22
Malaysia (Billboard)	18
Malaysia International (RIM)	19
Netherlands (Single Tip)	7
New Zealand (Recorded Music NZ)	8
New Zealand Airplay (RCS)	29
Norway (VG-lista)	76
Philippines Hot 100 (Billboard Philippines)	38
Singapore (RIAS)	7
South Korea (Circle)	155
Sweden Heatseeker (Sverigetopplistan)	5
Switzerland (Schweizer Hitparade)	61
UK Singles (Official Charts)	18
UK Hip Hop/R&B (Official Charts)	4
US Billboard Hot 100	19
US Hot Rock & Alternative Songs (Billboard)	2
US Pop Airplay (Billboard)	21
US Rock & Alternative Airplay (Billboard)	19

== Release history ==
Release history
Region	Date	Format(s)	Label	Ref.
United States	August 18, 2026	Contemporary hit radio	RCA	
