= Oh Yeah? (album) =

Studio album by Steve Lacy
- Released: July 17, 2026
- Genres: Rock; experimental R&B; pop
- Length: 39:54
- Label: RCA
- Producers: Marius de Vries; Steve Lacy; Matt Martians; Michael Uzowuru; Nicholas Weiss; Karl Wingate

Steve Lacy chronology
Gemini Rights (2022)	Oh Yeah? (2026)

Singles from Oh Yeah?
- 1. "The Feeling" Released: June 5, 2026; 2. "Oh Yeah?" Released: August 18, 2026

Oh Yeah? is the third studio album by American musician Steve Lacy. It was released on July 17, 2026, through RCA Records. Advertised as "a record for guitar kids who love synths and synth kids who love guitars", it is primarily a rock and R&B album with elements of breakbeat, pop, psychedelia, soul and trip hop, featuring guest performances by SZA, Erykah Badu and Cecile Believe. Released four years after his previous album, Gemini Rights, Oh Yeah? sees Lacy explore a more electronic sound and a more intentional approach to songwriting.

The album was produced by Lacy, Marius de Vries, Matt Martians, Michael Uzowuru, Nicholas Weiss and Karl Wingate, with Matthew Castellanos serving as executive producer and co-writer on all ten tracks. Lyrically, the album moves between juvenile humor and self-reflective sincerity, discussing existentialism, hedonism, societal issues and Lacy's romantic relationships, as well as how his encounter with fame at a young age had shaped him as a person. Preceding the album's release were the lead single "The Feeling" and the promotional singles "Nice Shoes" and "Is It Cool?". The title track was released to radio as the second single on August 18.

Oh Yeah? received positive reviews from critics, who praised the album's textural production, diversity of genres, and introspective themes, but were divided on some of its humor and lyrical content. The album reached number 14 on the Billboard 200, number 17 in Australia and number ten in New Zealand.

== Background and recording ==
Lacy traveled between Paris and Los Angeles during his work developing the album. Oh Yeah? was released four years after Lacy's previous album, Gemini Rights, which contained his breakout single, "Bad Habit". Lacy did not intend to replicate the single's success when working on the new album, but wished to match its unpolished neo-psychedelia and "off-kilter R&B"-styled production, describing Oh Yeah? as his "most engineered and most complete" album up to that point. In adapting to his newfound fame, he tried to avoid "[losing that] cool intellectual thing" while writing music, and said that "Bad Habit" proved to him that he could find mainstream success while retaining his eccentricity.

Lacy wanted the album's lyrics to be more intentional than those of his previous records and began to approach lyrics with the same degree of care that he would give to instruments, citing it as a reason for why it took so long to produce, saying that it felt like "fully designing a new language" for himself. Several of his attempts to move the album in a desired creative direction ended in frustration, leading him to give up on determining the order of tracks beforehand, calling it "one of the hardest albums to make".

In a March 2026 interview with British magazine i-D, singer-songwriter SZA said that Lacy had been taking part in her recording sessions, and that they had "made a random little project together". She appears on "Is It Cool?", the album's second track. The fourth track, "Pure Colour", (Note: Written as "Pure Color" in some sources.) features Erykah Badu, whom Lacy listed as one of his idols in a 2016 interview with the Fader. Lacy also became obsessed with Canadian musician Cecile Believe after learning she provided vocals for the 2018 Sophie album Oil of Every Pearl's Un-Insides. He likened her to a "human synthesizer", and she is featured on the track "Lovesexdrugbomb". Singer-songwriter Fousheé is credited as background vocalist and songwriter on several songs. The album also sees Lacy collaborate with members of the hip-hop collective Odd Future: his bandmate Matt Martians from the band the Internet, and Tyler, the Creator, who previously provided Lacy with songwriting input for "Bad Habit" and featured Lacy on his single "911 / Mr. Lonely".

== Composition and lyrics ==
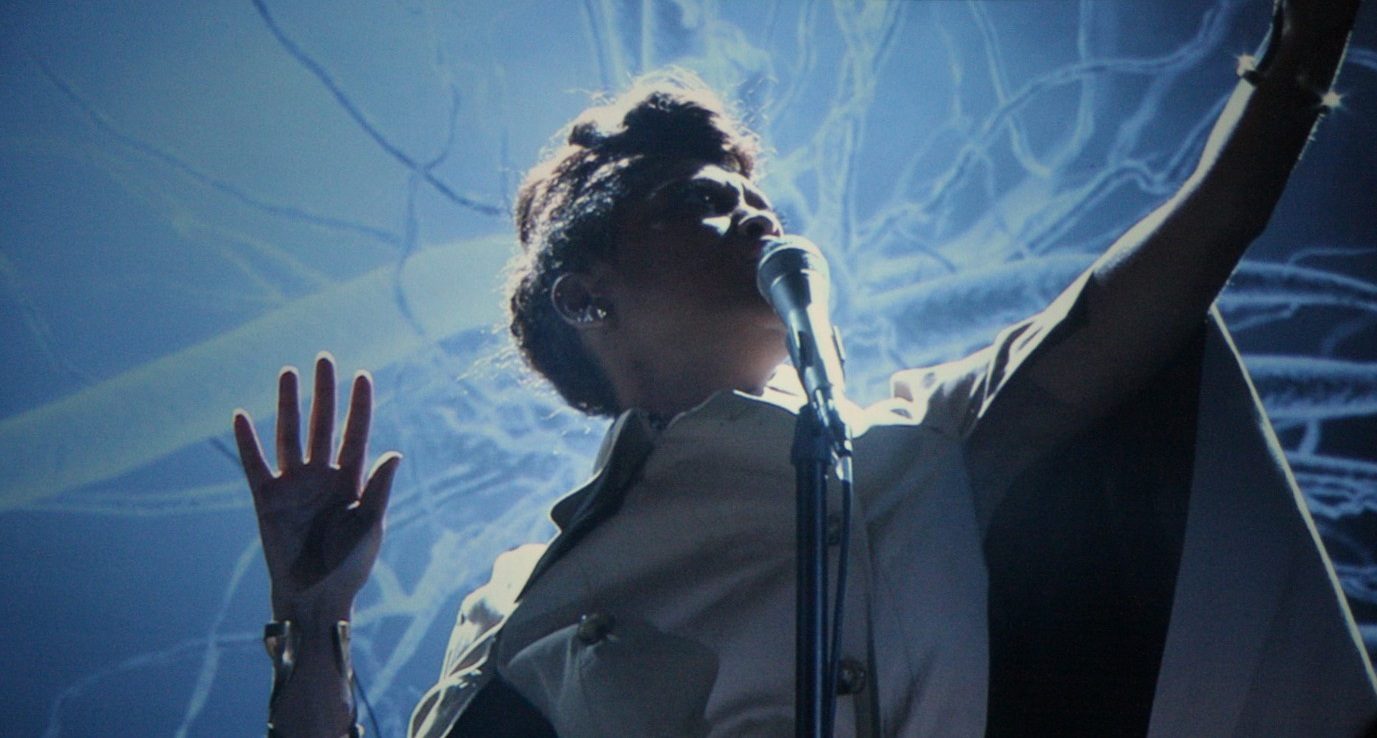
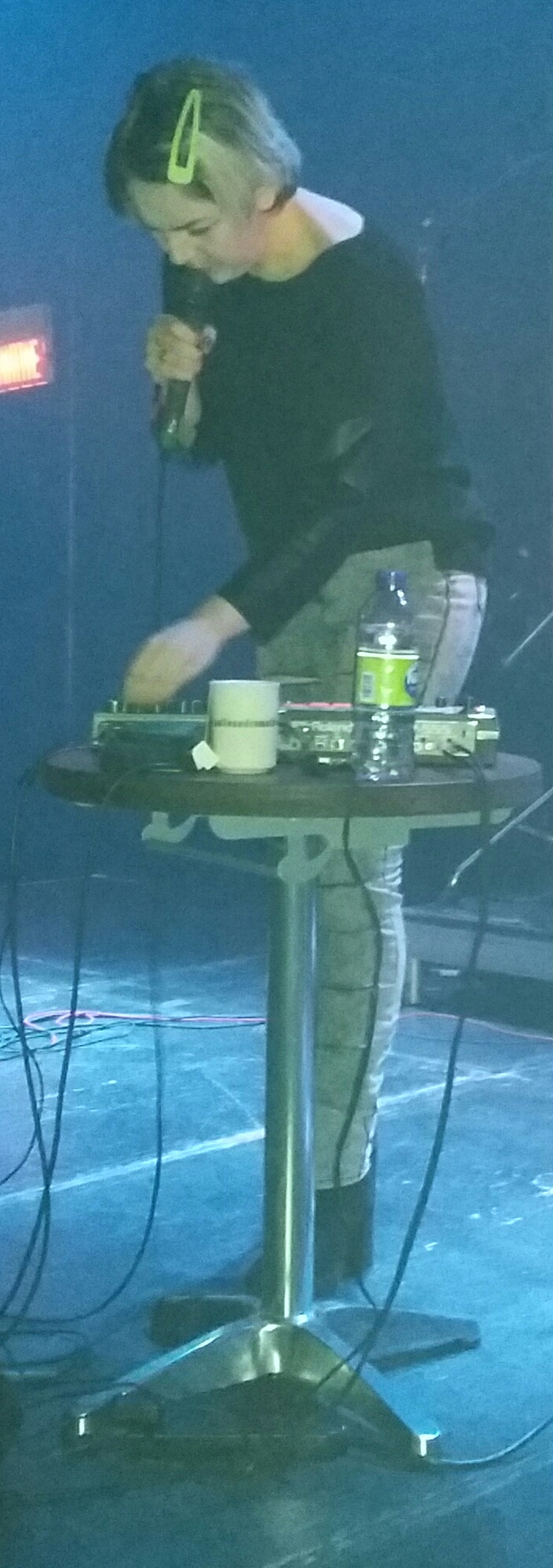
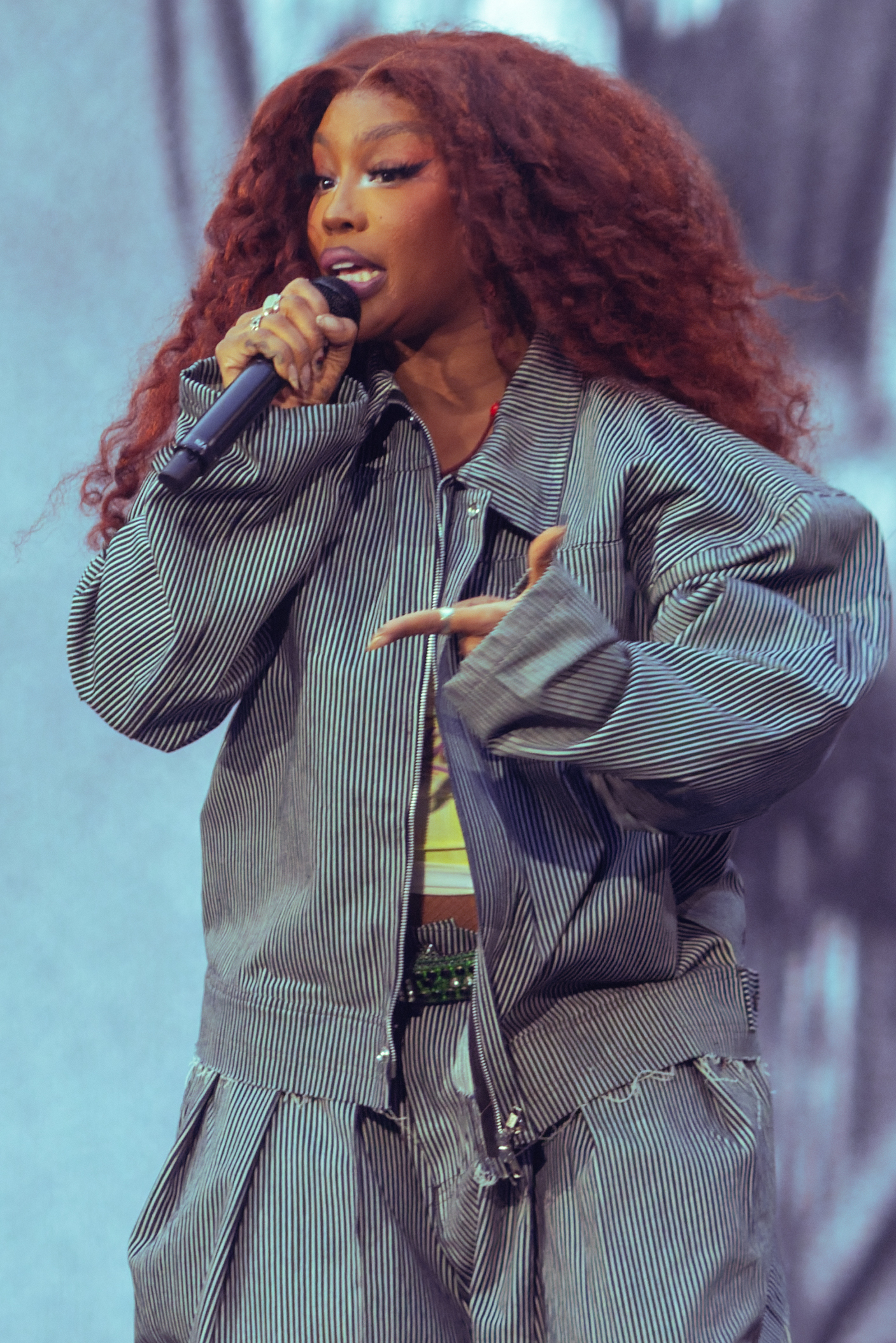
The album features guest vocals by Erykah Badu (top), Cecile Believe and SZA.

Oh Yeah? is influenced by the jazz works of Brazilian composer João Gilberto and the analog synthesizer sounds of British-French band Stereolab, as well as the psychedelic soul stylings of Erykah Badu, who is featured on the album. Lacy developed an interest in a more electronic sound after listening to the works of American musicians Flying Lotus and Thundercat, and became encouraged to incorporate the genre into his own music following an experience DJing to a small group of people after a party in Los Angeles.

In an interview with The Guardian, Lacy said that he uses comedy to disguise emotional trauma and that the album was inspired by a breakup that occurred prior to the release of his previous album, Gemini Rights, with both albums touching on the subject of a "long, on-and-off relationship". In a Rolling Stone interview, he said that the album was initially "much sadder" as a result of the breakup, and that he was experiencing changes in his life "in real time" while writing it. Speaking with Amanda Petrusich of The New Yorker, Lacy said that the album is an exploration of how his focus on becoming a musician at an early age left him "underdeveloped as a human", referring to contributing to the Internet's Grammy Award-nominated album Ego Death at the age of 17. Lacy also felt that Oh Yeah? brought him back to faith while living "in a very faithless time", considering love itself to be a question of faith.

Jeff Ihaza of Rolling Stone wrote that the album brings together "genre-splicing rock" and experimental R&B. According to Ihaza, the album "operates at a more subtle register" than Gemini Rights, which he considered to be an example of "pop maximalism". He wrote that Oh Yeah? turns breakbeats, guitar ballads, trip hop and crude lyrics into a "volatile pop language" specific to Lacy, finding the album's lyrics to concern Lacy's queer identity and the plausibility of love, as well as his relationship with his father and thereby his Filipino heritage.

Nicolas Tyrell-Scott wrote for NME that the album's lyrical content contrasts Lacy's hedonism, fearlessness and self-sabotage with existentialism, rumination and concern for societal issues, finding a thematic connection between Oh Yeah? and his previous two albums through Lacy's "radical display of honesty". Writing for Clash, Shahzaib Hussain called the album a "hypnagogic experience" with introspective lyrics balanced by "engineered nonchalance" and centered on romantic fixation. According to Petrusich, the album draws from the "offline charms" of 1990s R&B as it discusses the "utter impossibility" of modern romance and "the disaffection of a life lived through a screen".

=== Songs ===
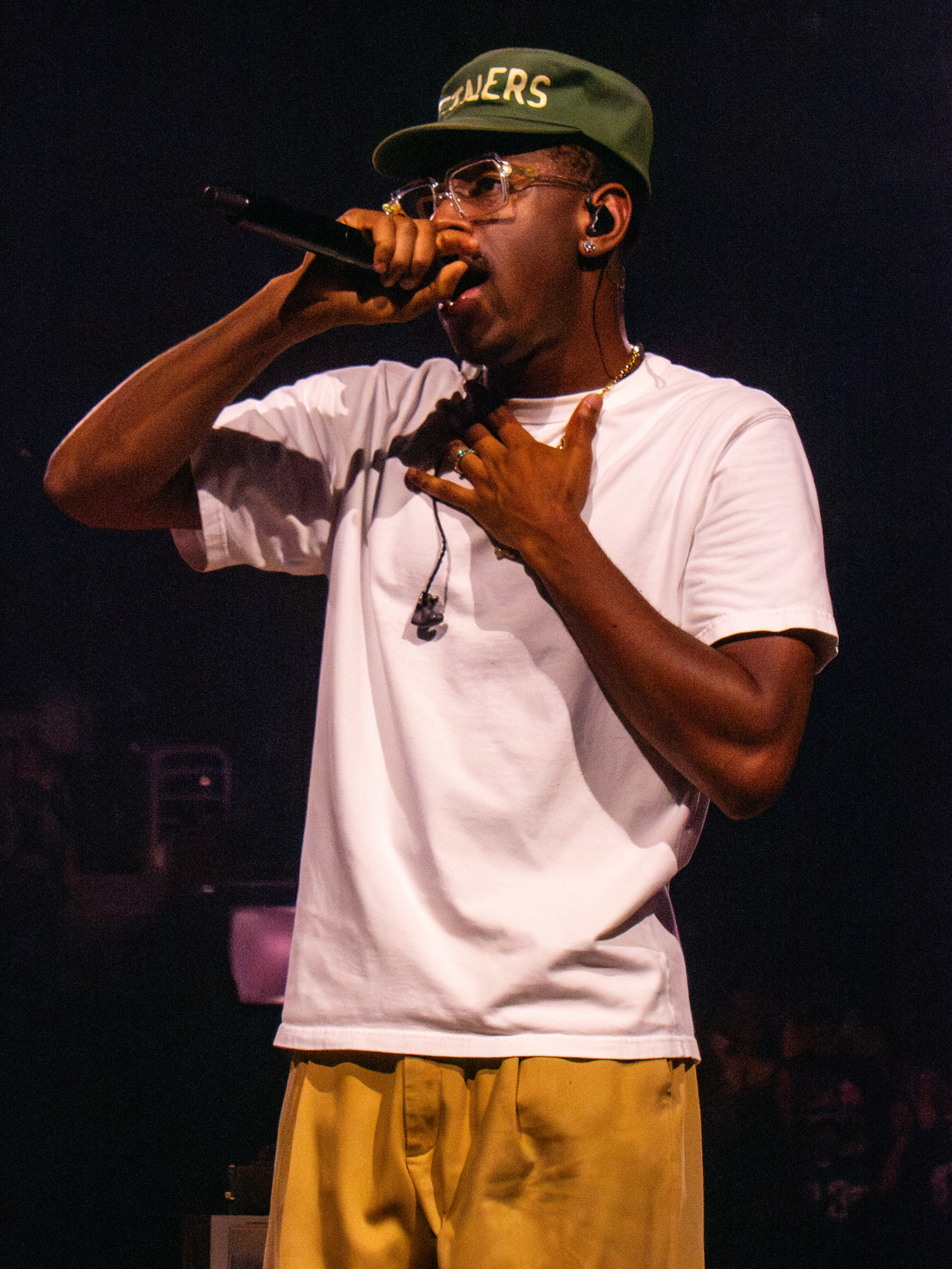
Lacy collaborated with Tyler, the Creator (pictured in 2025) on the track "Lovesexdrugbomb", which critics praised for its humor.

The first track, titled "Oh Yeah?", touches on existentialism and vulnerability, featuring synthesizers and psychedelic pop/rock-inspired electric guitar riffs. "Is It Cool?" is an R&B and soul song with elements of funk that discusses developing trust in a romantic relationship, as well as infidelity, emotional immaturity and behavior that Lacy calls "self-sabotage". Lacy refers to his father as tatay in Tagalog in the opening verse, citing his death as a reason for his habit of infidelity. The improvised verse was so poignant that it even surprised Lacy himself—as well as producer Matt Martians and singer Fousheé—during a studio session. SZA's vocals answer Lacy in the song, taking the role of his partner, who chooses to look past his flaws: "Can we get naked instead of talking?” "The Feeling" is described by NME's Damian Jones as a "moody synth single". The track builds on a subdued bassline and "angelic" vocals aided by Alice Smith, with lyrics that address a troubled relationship.

The bass- and reverb-heavy "Pure Colour", featuring vocals by Erykah Badu, is described by Lacy as an escape from grieving the deaths of his relatives. Jeff Ihaza of Rolling Stone compared the track to the works of English electronic band Portishead, calling the song "trip hop territory". "Show You Me" is an acoustic guitar ballad with puerile lyrics composed of flirtatious conversation fragments that touch on the subject of "bisexual panic". "Doom" is a soul and alternative rock song, which, according to Tyrell-Scott, addresses a "plagued late-Millennial and Gen Z dating landscape" and provides rationale for Lacy's hedonism. The acoustic guitar-driven "Nothing" is described by Pitchfork's Alphonse Pierre as a break from Lacy's romantic R&B that sees him turn to lustful slang that Pierre attributes to the social network TikTok. "Lovesexdrugbomb" is co-written by Tyler, the Creator and features Cecile Believe delivering the song's R&B-imbued second hook, with Lacy on guitar. "Nice Shoes / In Your World" is introduced as a breakbeat track aided by synthesizers, followed by an introspective slow funk second half with a spoken word outro by Lacy "thanking his past loves". Ihaza found the song to represent a delirious "emotional release" in the context of the album, marking a shift from Lacy's cynicism to renewed romantic possibility. The final track, "Bebe", is a psychedelic rock postscript with doubtful lyrics that leave the album's themes unresolved.

== Release ==
Lacy initially wanted to release the album on April 20, 2024, to coincide with the cannabis holiday of 4/20. Lacy revealed the title of the album, Oh Yeah?, in a Rolling Stone cover story published on August 14, 2025. On August 15, the first promotional single, "Nice Shoes", was released.

On June 3, 2026, Lacy revealed the album cover, photographed by Gus Van Sant. He also announced the release date as July 17. On June 5, the track list for the album was revealed, and "The Feeling" was released as the lead single. The song was accompanied by a music video directed by Matthew Castellanos. A press release described the upcoming album as "a record for guitar kids who love synths [synthesizers] and synth kids who love guitars". The next promotional single, "Is It Cool?", was released on June 26.

The album was released on July 17 through RCA Records. The album reached number 14 on the Billboard 200, as well as number four on the publication's Top R&B/Hip-Hop Albums and Top Rock & Alternative Albums charts. It reached number 17 on Australia's ARIA Albums Chart and number two on their Hip Hop/R&B Albums chart. In the United Kingdom the album reached number 81 on the Official Charts' UK Albums Chart and number three on their R&B Albums chart. It also reached number ten on the Official Aotearoa Music Charts in New Zealand.

"Oh Yeah?", the album's title track, entered the Billboard Hot 100 after being included in the film Spider-Man: Brand New Day. It impacted pop radio in the US on August 18, 2026, as the album's second single.

Lacy embarked on the North American Oh Yeah? Tour in support of the album, beginning on September 27, 2026 in Minneapolis. The tour is expected to conclude on November 30, 2026 in Vancouver.

== Critical reception ==
Professional ratings
Aggregate scores
Source	Rating
Metacritic	75/100
Review scores
Source	Rating
AllMusic	4/5 stars
Clash	8/10
Exclaim!	8/10
NME	4/5 stars
Our Culture Mag	3.5/5 stars
Pitchfork	6.0/10
Rolling Stone	4/5 stars

According to review aggregator Metacritic, the album received "generally favorable reviews" based on a weighted average score of 75 out of 100 from ten critic scores.

NME's Nicolas Tyrell-Scott wrote in a review of Oh Yeah? that Lacy "proves that emotions can be powerful tools", and that "his instincts allow him to adequately move forth when necessary, never lingering in an emotion to the point that it feels redundant". Jeff Ihaza of Rolling Stone, who had interviewed Lacy on several occasions, wrote in his review of the album that "Lacy makes his strongest claim yet to being one of Gen Z’s defining pop auteurs". He added that its lyrical content "makes sincerity and absurdity sound like neighboring impulses", calling the humor "jarring" at times, namely on the track "Show You Me", which he believed could become an unexpected mainstream hit.

In a review for Clash, Shahzaib Hussain wrote that Oh Yeah? is "just shy of a true classic", stating that the album "works best when Lacy leans into textural and variegated production", finding Lacy to have aspirations in the pop genre. Hussain called "Show You Me" an "excellent acoustic ballad" and singled out "Pure Colour" as an example of Lacy's "off-beat virtuosity". Dylan Barnabe of Exclaim! praised Lacy's textural, layered production and his ability to reach across genres like synth-pop and neo soul in a manner in which other artists would struggle, adding that Lacy "[turns his] wry social observations inward" with lyrics that "oscillate between revelatory and absurd". Barnabe wrote that Lacy's thoughts on mortality, love and sexuality are "grounded firmly" in experience, which keeps his lyrics relatable to audiences. He also praised the choice of guest performers, finding that it demonstrates Lacy's ability to keep up with trends.

Konstantinos Pappis of Our Culture Mag called the album "generally satisfying" while finding its existential themes to be "shoddy" and distracting at times. Pappis said that more of Lacy's writing could benefit from a conversational style, citing "Is It Cool?" as an example. He criticized Lacy's social commentary on "Doom" and found the lyrics of "Show You Me" to be "hard-pressed to grab your attention". Reviewing "Nothing", Pappis wrote that Lacy's use of acoustic guitar works best when it is "bold and surprising", and that "Bebe" might be the album's most memorable track. He also praised the comedic timing of "Lovesexdrugbomb", calling Tyler, the Creator's songwriting influence noticeable.

Pitchfork's Alphonse Pierre was more critical of Oh Yeah?, writing that "nothing on [the album] seems to come naturally" and that its themes of breakups, sex and romance are "too cliché" to be relatable, yet also too vague for the listener to imagine as Lacy's own experiences, finding that "The Feeling" fails to elaborate on Lacy's feelings towards his ex-partner. He wrote that some of the jokes on the album felt forced, but argued that Lacy is naturally funny when he is less restrained in recounting his relationship stories, particularly on the track "Lovesexdrugbomb", comparing its "wickedness" to the lyrics of American rapper Future. Pierre called "Is It Cool?" a "by-the-books" collaboration, finding the guitar work to be generic and reminiscent of the rock and hip-hop band N.E.R.D., also comparing the track "Doom" to the "nerd-rock" of Weezer and criticizing its "broad and plainspoken" generalizations about the difficulty of finding love. In a summary, he felt that Lacy "seems pretty confused about how much of himself he has to let go of to be a pop star", praising "Bebe", "Pure Colour" and "Nothing", but concluding that he expects none of the songs to match the success of "Bad Habit".

== Track listing ==
No.	Title	Writer(s)	Producer(s)	Length
1.	"Oh Yeah?"	Steve Lacy; Matthew Castellanos	Lacy; Michael Uzowuru	2:50
2.	"Is It Cool?" (featuring SZA)	Lacy; Castellanos; Brittany Fousheé; Solána Rowe	Lacy; Matt Martians; Karl Wingate; Uzowuru	2:54
3.	"The Feeling"	Lacy; Castellanos; Alice Smith	Lacy; Nicholas Weiss^{[A]}; Luka Kloser^{[V]}	4:36
4.	"Pure Colour" (featuring Erykah Badu)	Lacy; Erykah Badu; Castellanos; Alexandra Love	Lacy; Weiss; Badu^{[V]}; Michael Chavarria^{[V]}	3:06
5.	"Show You Me"	Lacy; Castellanos; Fousheé	Lacy; Kloser^{[V]}	3:22
6.	"Doom"	Lacy; Castellanos; Aaron Maine	Lacy	4:52
7.	"Nothing"	Lacy; Castellanos	Lacy	2:29
8.	"Lovesexdrugbomb" (featuring Cecile Believe)	Lacy; Castellanos; Tyler Okonma; Caila Thompson-Hannant; Weiss	Lacy; Uzowuru; Weiss	3:56
9.	"Nice Shoes / In Your World"	Lacy; Castellanos; Lyn Collins	Lacy; Weiss^{[A]}	9:03
10.	"Bebe"	Lacy; Karl Blau; Castellanos; Fousheé; Philip Elverum; Bret Lunsford	Lacy; Marius de Vries	2:47
Total length:				39:54

=== Notes ===
- ^A Denotes an additional producer.
- ^V Denotes a vocal producer.
- All track titles are stylized in lowercase.
- Track lengths are adapted from Spotify.

== Personnel ==
Credits are adapted from Tidal.

- Steve Lacy – performance
- Guillaume Panloup – engineering
- Jacob Johnston – engineering
- Sean Matsukawa – engineering
- Matthew Castellanos – executive producer
- Jon Castelli – mixing
- Ruairi O'Flaherty – mastering
- Brittany Fousheé – background vocals (tracks 1, 2)
- Michael Uzowuru – programming (track 1), arrangement (2)
- Karl Wingate – engineering (tracks 1, 7, 8)
- Cecile Believe – background vocals (track 1), performance (8)
- Nicholas Weiss – bass (track 1)
- Gosha Usov – engineering (track 1)
- SZA – performance (track 2)
- Ravyn Lenae – background vocals (track 2)
- Caleb Laven – engineering (track 2)
- Alice Smith – background vocals (track 3)
- Luka Kloser – vocal engineering (track 3)
- Erykah Badu – performance (track 4)
- Michael Chavarria – engineering (track 4)
- Nicholas Weiss – synthesizer programming (track 5), synthesizer (6)
- Tyler Okonma – drum programming (track 8)
- Asia Lacy – background vocals (track 9)
- Valerie Lacy – background vocals (track 9)
- Valyn Spottsville – background vocals (track 9)
- Vijay Beasley – background vocals (track 9)
- John Carroll Kirby – keyboards (track 9)
- Alex Williams – engineering (tracks 1, 5, 6)

== Charts ==
Chart performance for Oh Yeah?
Chart (2026)	Peak position
Australian Albums (ARIA)	17
Australian Hip Hop/R&B Albums (ARIA)	2
Belgian Albums (Ultratop Flanders)	84
Belgian Albums (Ultratop Wallonia)	100
Canadian Albums (Billboard)	39
Danish Vinyl Albums (Hitlisten)	24
Dutch Albums (Album Top 100)	77
French Albums (SNEP)	108
Irish Albums (IRMA)	65
Japanese Dance & Soul Albums (Oricon)	6
Lithuanian Albums (AGATA)	41
New Zealand Albums (RMNZ)	10
Portuguese Albums (AFP)	48
Scottish Albums (Official Charts)	55
Swiss Albums (Schweizer Hitparade)	47
UK Albums (Official Charts)	81
UK R&B Albums (Official Charts)	2
US Billboard 200	14
US Top R&B/Hip-Hop Albums (Billboard)	4
US Top Rock & Alternative Albums (Billboard)	4
