= The Dark Red =

- Directed by: Dan Bush
- Written by: Dan Bush; Conal Byrne
- Produced by: Dan Bush; Joshua Wilcox
- Starring: Conal Byrne; Kelsey Scott
- Cinematography: Victoria K. Warren
- Edited by: Dan Bush
- Music by: Ben Lovett
- Production company: Dark Sky Films
- Release dates: October 2018 (Austin Film Festival); March 2, 2020 (San Francisco)
- Running time: 101 minutes
- Country: United States
- Language: English

The Dark Red is a 2018 American independent mystery thriller film edited, produced, written and directed by Dan Bush and co-written by and starring Conal Byrne. The film premiered at the 2018 Austin Film Festival.

== Plot ==
A worker from child protective services finds a baby alive in the trailer home of its dead and intoxicated mother. Fast forward, Sybil Warren is a ward in a psychiatric hospital. Every day she meets with her therapist, Dr. Deluce, to whom she describes the living hell that her life has been. On one of such days, Sybil tells her that she is possessed by a demon who gifted her psychic powers, but who in return for it, kidnapped her and cut her unborn baby out of her uterus. As a psychiatrist, Dr. Deluce tries to come up with a rational explanation for the tale that Sybil told her. One of such explanations that Dr. Deluce proposed was that her ex-boyfriend, David, following her being pregnant, invites her to meet his parents. A discussion over a dinner table about their grandchild-to-be provokes an argument, which Sybil barely escapes. Despite being diagnosed as schizophrenic, Sybil is being released from the hospital, and following it, tracks down her ex-boyfriend and seeks revenge.

== Cast ==
- April Billingsley as Sybil Warren
  - Celementine June Seng Stack as young Sybil Warren
- Kelsey Scott as Dr. Deluce
- Conal Byrne as David Hollyfield
- Rhoda Griffis as Rose Holyfield
- John Curran as William Holyfield
- Jill Jane Clements as Kathrine Warren
- Bernard Setaro Clark as Dr. Morales
- Robert Pralgo as CEO
- Robert Mello as grieving man
- Kevin Stillwell as Mr. Mercer
- Blaire Hillman as woman in the purple coat
- Katie Hahn as pregnant woman
- Sorrell Sanders as suicide woman
- Lake Roberts as corporate lawyer #1
- Lauren Vogelbaum as corporate lawyer #2

== Reception ==
On review aggregator website Rotten Tomatoes, the film has an approval rating of 78% based on 9 critics, with an average rating of 6.5/10.

Richard Whittaker of The Austin Chronicle wrote "The Dark Red isn't afraid to get a little bloody, and it's all the more entertaining for it".

Noel Murray of the Los Angeles Times said that the film "feels out of balance", adding that "[while] the blood-soaked climactic standoff is fine, [it is] not exciting or scary enough to justify an hour of slow-paced setup".

Writing for Variety, Dennis Harvey commented "A psychiatric patient's convoluted backstory drives this intriguing if overloaded indie genre exercise".
