= Bad Habit (Steve Lacy song) =

Single by Steve Lacy

from the album Gemini Rights
- Released: June 29, 2022
- Recorded: June 2021–June 2022
- Genre: R&B; synth-pop; bedroom pop; alt-pop; slacker rock
- Length: 3:52 (album version); 2:45 (radio version)
- Label: RCA
- Songwriters: Steve Lacy; Diana Gordon; John Kirby; Britanny Fousheé; Matthew Castellanos
- Producer: Steve Lacy

Steve Lacy singles chronology
"Mercury" (2022)	"Bad Habit" (2022)	"Sunshine" (2022)

Music video
- "Bad Habit" on YouTube

"Bad Habit" is a song recorded by the American musician Steve Lacy. It was the second released single from his second studio album, Gemini Rights, on June 29, 2022. The psychedelic and lo-fi R&B and bedroom pop ballad was produced by Lacy and is built around a slightly warped guitar riff, which is accompanied by a funky bassline, drums and synthesisers. Lyrically, it concerns Lacy's regret over a missed opportunity with a crush. His lack of confidence later shifts to a more confident perspective during the song's final breakdown.

After signing to RCA Records in 2021, Lacy began writing "Bad Habit", which he identified as a turning point for him creatively. He recorded its first version that same year. Over the following year, it was changed substantially from its original version and received writing contributions from singers Fousheé and Diana Gordon. After its release, "Bad Habit" and sped-up versions of it became popular on TikTok in July 2022 and it became Lacy's first entry on the Billboard Hot 100 that same month. It subsequently became the first song to top both the Hot R&B/Hip-Hop Songs and Hot Rock & Alternative Songs charts as well as the first song to top five of Billboard's genre charts, and later rose to number one on the Hot 100 in October 2022. It peaked in the top-ten of the charts in Australia, the United Kingdom, and Ireland.

"Bad Habit" received critical acclaim and was named the best song of 2022 by Billboard, The Guardian, and The Ringer while being named one of the best songs of the year by other publications such as Rolling Stone, USA Today, and Time. A music video directed by Julian Klincewicz was released concurrently with the song and was nominated for a BET Award and a Soul Train Music Award. Lacy performed "Bad Habit" at the 65th Annual Grammy Awards, where it was nominated for Song of the Year, Record of the Year, and Best Pop Solo Performance. He also performed the song as the closer for his Give You the World Tour in late 2022. The song was also nominated for an MTV Music Video Award, an iHeartRadio Music Award, and two Soul Train Music Awards.

== Background and release ==
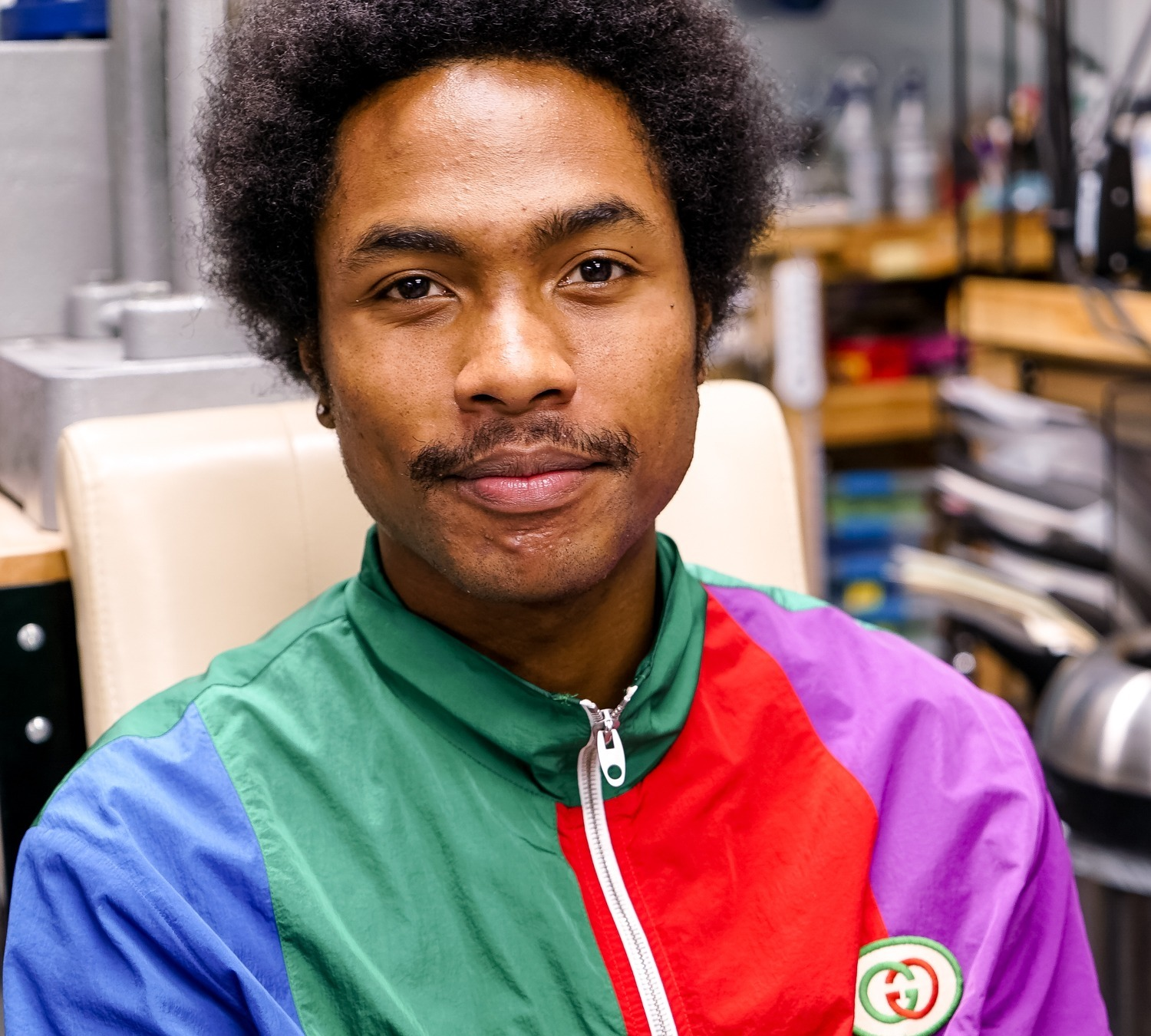
"Bad Habit" was performed, co-written, and produced by American singer Steve Lacy (pictured)

In 2015, Lacy became a member of the Los Angeles-based R&B and neo soul group the Internet, an offshoot of the hip hop collective Odd Future, and found success as a solo artist starting in 2017 from independently producing music on his iPhone with the help of GarageBand. His debut extended play (EP), Steve Lacy's Demo, was released in 2017; its single "Dark Red" went viral on TikTok in August 2021. Lacy went on to release his debut studio album, Apollo XXI, in 2019, which he wrote, produced, and mixed on his own, and to collaborate on songs with J. Cole, Solange, Tyler, the Creator, Mac Miller, Vampire Weekend, Kendrick Lamar, Dev Hynes, and YG.

In 2021, Lacy signed to RCA Records. "Bad Habit" was first recorded in June 2021 using a beat Lacy created with drums he had previously used. Lacy described writing it as a turning point for him, stating that it was "the start of this renaissance of the separation between [past] Steve and [present] Steve". After he played the instrumental for American singer Fousheé, with whom he later collaborated on several songs for his second studio album, Gemini Rights, the two spent about 20 minutes freestyling over the song, which led to them writing verses and a melody for the chorus. He changed other elements throughout the following year, such as its ending breakdown, its drums, and its chorus. Songwriter Diana Gordon wrote part of the song's ending. John Carroll Kirby and Matthew Castellanos are also credited as co-writers. It was produced by Lacy, mixed by Neal Pogue at his Hot Purple Petting Zoo studio in Los Angeles, and mastered by Mike Bozzi of Bernie Grundman Mastering. According to Lacy, it was completed a week before Lacy submitted Gemini Rights to RCA Records.

"Bad Habit" was released on June 29, 2022, through RCA Records as the second single from Gemini Rights, which was released on July 15, 2022. It found viral success on TikTok starting in July 2022 and soundtracked over 710,000 TikTok videos by January 2023. Fan-made sped-up versions also became popular on TikTok, one of which was used in over 430,000 videos. This prompted RCA Records to officially release a sped-up version, which Lacy initially found "gross" but eventually agreed to in the hopes that it would help the song reach number one on the Billboard Hot 100 while it sat at number two behind Harry Styles' 2022 single "As It Was".

== Composition ==
"Bad Habit"
The opening refrain of "Bad Habit" features Lacy singing, "I wish I knew/I wish I knew you wanted me", over a repeated, slightly warped guitar riff

"Bad Habit" is a psychedelic, lo-fi, R&B, bedroom pop, and alt-pop ballad that mixes elements of baroque pop, grunge, soft rock, punk, synth-pop, indie rock, neo soul, funk, slacker rock, jangle pop, indie pop, and hip hop. Sheet music for the song shows the key of F minor with a tempo range of 84-88 beats per minute. Vocals range from C_{4} to C_{6}. The song opens with vocals from Fousheé and is split into three parts.

Lacy sings about his regret over missing the chance to tell someone he is attracted to them due to his shyness over a funky bassline, "messy-sounding" drums, funk-styled synths, and a repetitive, slightly warped guitar riff, the last of which was mixed by Pogue to be the song's main focus. He sings in a falsetto throughout the song. In its chorus, he sings, "I wish I knew/I wish I knew you wanted me," which was changed from Lacy's original lyrics—"I wish I knew you/I wish I knew you wanted me"—following a suggestion from Tyler, the Creator to remove the first "you" for the chorus to "be more memorable". The song's title is borrowed from another lyric in its chorus: "I bite my tongue, it's a bad habit/Kinda mad that I didn't take a stab at it". The song transitions into a stripped-back a cappella section, which Lacy intended to sound like he was "singing directly to" the listener, before ending with a "chaotic" jazz fusion breakdown, during which Lacy sings, with "rougher" and "more textured" vocals, "Let's fuck in the back of the mall, lose control/Go stupid, go crazy, babe". Lacy described the song's lyrics as being "a play on confidence" that shifts from him not feeling good enough for another person to feeling "almost too good" but "still down". He also described the song's refrain ("I wish I knew you wanted me") as representing his fans and listeners wanting something from him that he was unaware of.

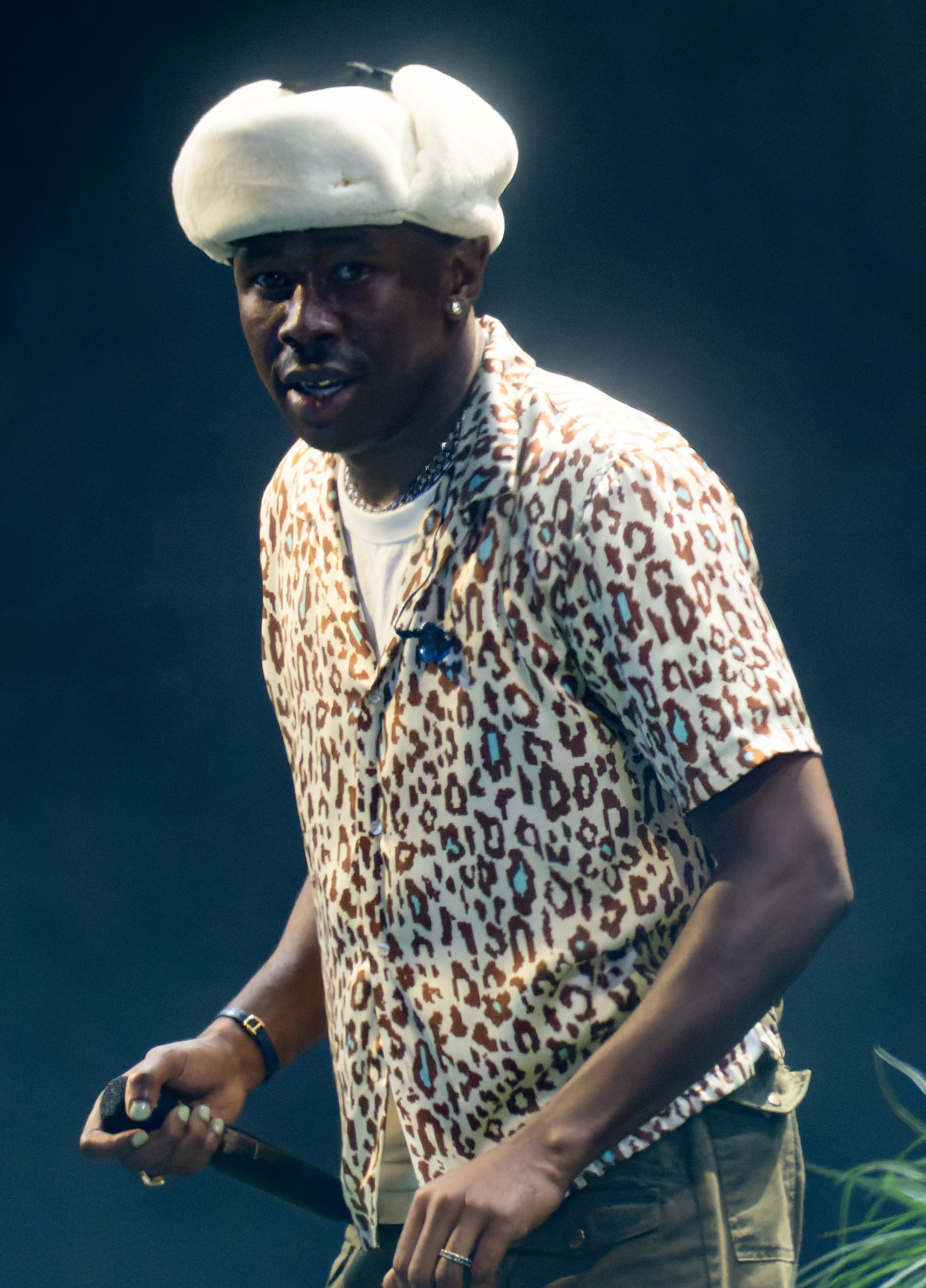
Lacy changed the lyrics to the chorus of "Bad Habit" due to a suggestion from Tyler, the Creator (pictured)

For Exclaim!, A. Harmony wrote that the song was about "scorching lust". Clash's Shahzaib Hussain called the song "lilting" and "Mac DeMarco-esque". HipHopDX's Lauren Floyd stated that Lacy sang with a "boyish tone" that "transports listeners back to the MTV golden era of spring break beach jams". For NPR, LaTesha Harris compared the synths on the song to Prince and Lacy's falsetto to D'Angelo, calling the song a "seductive tragedy" and stating that its lyrics and vocals "alternate between petulant, obsessive, regretful and smug".

== Reception ==
"Bad Habit" received critical acclaim. For Billboard, Andrew Unterberger called "Bad Habit" a "perfect pop song" that displayed Lacy's "impossibly high-level" craft, adding that it "never ran out of new thrills, big and small, to get you swooning like the first time ... you heard it". Pitchfork's Stephen Kearse praised "Bad Habit" as a highlight from Gemini Rights, calling its chorus a "knockout earworm". It was called a "flirty standout" from Gemini Rights and a "summer bop" by Ecleen Luzmila Caraballo of Crack. Sam Eeckhout of The Line of Best Fit called the song "powerful" and used the song as an example of Lacy's vocals "carry[ing]" Gemini Rights. Cady Lang of Time wrote that the song evoked "pure, euphoric joy" and that Lacy's songwriting had a "deeply emotional impact", while NME's Sam Moore called it a showcase of "Lacy's impressive vocal range, his nifty way around a guitar and his tattoo-worthy lyrics". Mic's Austin Williams praised "Bad Habit" as "immediately singable and instantly replayable", deeming its melodies "addictive" and its lyrics "endearing".

For The Guardian, Shaad D'Souza opined that it was "arguably" the best song to "spring forth from the new wave of TikTok-beloved lo-fi bedroom pop stars such as Clairo and Beabadoobee" and that it "captures all the brilliance of Lacy's outstanding second record Gemini Rights". Consequence's Paolo Ragusa described the song as "a miraculously good pop song", "a testament to Lacy's creative freedom", and "one of the most deserved breakthroughs of 2022", which "twist[ed] the concept of desire and a missed connection into something wholly original and authentic". Paul Tingen of Sound on Sound wrote that the song "lacks the typical trappings of modern hit songs" such as 808s and Auto-Tune, but that its attitude was the likely reason for its popularity. For GQ, Insanul Ahmed stated that "Bad Habit" "feels like it could have been released in any era of music", describing it as "a despondent anthem that remarkably manages to fit into everyone's Instagram story montage". For the New Yorker, Amanda Petrusich called "Bad Habit" the "most interesting song to move from TikTok to the top of the charts" in 2022, attributing its online success to the chorus being "dopey and uncomplicated" and "tap[ping] into a wellspring of shared feeling" while praising Lacy's "lackadaisical delivery" on the song as "beguiling". For the Washington Post, Chris Kelly described "Bad Habit" as "a gentle pop earworm that sounds like staring at stars glued to a bedroom ceiling".

=== Accolades ===
"Bad Habit" was named the best song of 2022 by Billboard The Guardian, and The Ringer, and named one of the best songs of 2022 by NPR, Rolling Stone, USA Today, Associated Press, Time, Complex, Consequence, Dazed, Exclaim!, Entertainment Weekly, and NME. "Bad Habit" was nominated for the Grammy Awards for Best Pop Solo Performance, Song of the Year, and Record of the Year at the 65th Annual Grammy Awards. It was also nominated for Song of Summer at the 2022 MTV Video Music Awards, for Best Song of the Year and the Ashford & Simpson Songwriter's Award at the 2022 Soul Train Music Awards, for TikTok Bop of the Year at the 2023 iHeartRadio Music Awards, and for Song of the Year at the 2023 MTV Video Music Awards.

== Commercial performance ==
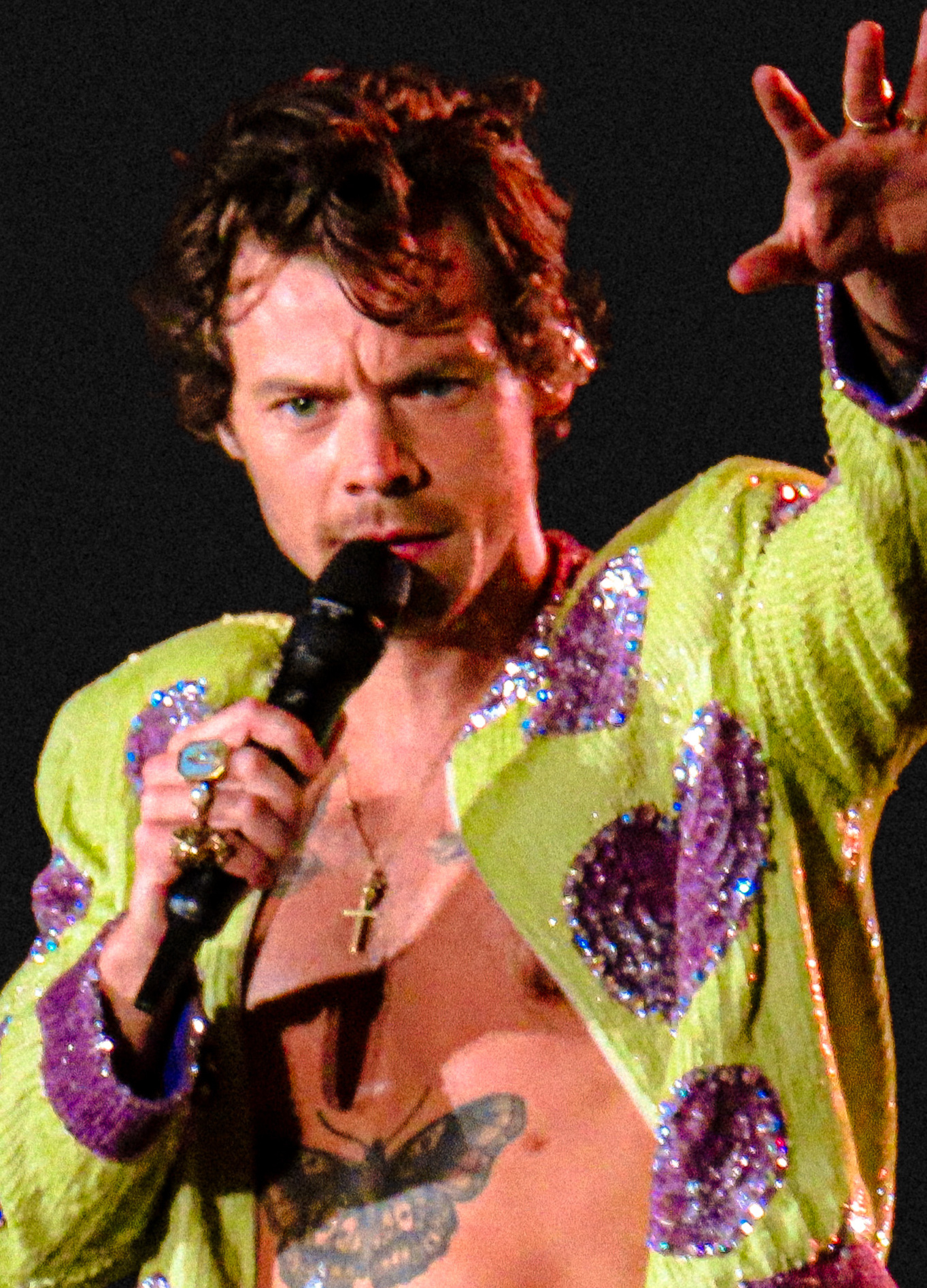
"Bad Habit" reached number one on the Billboard Hot 100 in October 2022, ending a 15-week-long streak at the top led by "As It Was" by Harry Styles (pictured)

"Bad Habit" entered the Billboard Hot 100 at number 100 when it first became popular on TikTok in July 2022. It was Lacy's first entry on the chart. On the chart issued September 10, 2022, "Bad Habit" became the first song to top both the Hot R&B/Hip-Hop Songs and Hot Rock & Alternative Songs charts by Billboard. It also topped Billboard's Hot Rock Songs, Hot Alternative Songs, and Hot R&B Songs charts, making "Bad Habit" the first song to top five different Billboard genre charts at once. That same week, the song rose to number two on the Hot 100. After remaining at number two for four weeks, "Bad Habit" rose to the top of Hot 100 on the chart dated October 3, 2022, displacing Harry Styles's 2022 single "As It Was", which had been at the top for 15 weeks, and becoming Lacy's first number one and the 1,142nd number one overall. It was the third song of 2022 to be both the first chart entry and first number one for an artist on the Hot 100 after "Heat Waves" by Glass Animals and "We Don't Talk About Bruno" by the cast of Encanto, and the first number one since "Someone You Loved" by Lewis Capaldi topped the chart in November 2019 to have no accompanying acts and also be an artist's first chart entry. It was also the 12th number one to have debuted at number 100.

In Australia, "Bad Habit" reached number three on the ARIA Singles Chart. It peaked in the top-10 of the Irish Singles Chart in July 2022 and at number eight on the UK Singles Chart in October 2022 to become Lacy's first top-10 on either chart while also peaking at number 10 in Canada.

== Music video ==
The music video for "Bad Habit" was directed by Julian Klincewicz, who also photographed the cover for Gemini Rights, and released on the same day as the single. It features Lacy singing, dancing, and making wide, maniacal movements in a color-changing empty space. In it, he wears black leather pants, black sunglasses, black boots, and a white shirt bearing an "S" on the front and a target on the back, the same outfit worn by him in the music video for his previous single, "Mercury".

"Bad Habit" was nominated for Video of the Year at the 2023 BET Awards and the 2022 Soul Train Music Awards.

== Live performances and cover versions ==
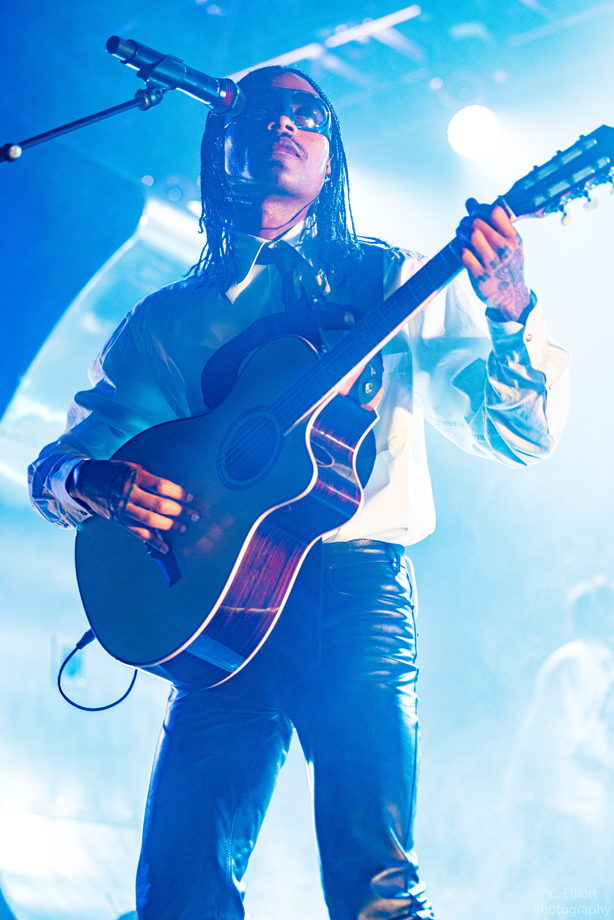
Lacy performing on his Give You the World Tour in October 2022

Lacy performed "Bad Habit" at the 65th Annual Grammy Awards in February 2023 alongside Thundercat and three other backing musicians. The performance began with Lacy, who wore a leather outfit, sunglasses, and high heels, starting with a lyric from the song ("You can't surprise a Gemini") before giving a thumbs up and singing the song while playing guitar.

English band Wet Leg performed a post-punk cover of "Bad Habit" for the BBC Radio 1 Live Lounge in September 2022. Lacy performed "Bad Habit" on an Amy Schumer-hosted episode of Saturday Night Live in November 2022. Stephen Thompson wrote of the performance for NPR that "Lacy and his band didn't do much to elevate the material onstage" and that "the energy levels [were] set to 'mid'". The song was included on the setlist for Lacy's Give You the World Tour through North America, which promoted Gemini Rights and ran from October to November 2022, where it was used to close out Lacy's shows. Videos from the tour filmed during performances of "Bad Habit" went viral on TikTok due to concertgoers not singing along to anything other than the chorus. A debate arose among fans of Lacy's over the large influx of new fans being unfamiliar with most of his other work. During a performance of the song at the Orpheum Theater in New Orleans in late October 2022, Lacy stopped to ask fans not to throw items onstage before taking a disposable camera from a fan in the front row and smashing it on the ground, after which he ended the show. Later that week, he posted a statement to his Instagram account about the camera, writing, "I don't believe I owe anyone an apology ... maybe I could've reacted better? Sure."

== Personnel and credits ==
Credits adapted from liner notes of Gemini Rights.

- Steve Lacy – songwriting, production, bass
- John Carroll Kirby – songwriting, additional synths
- Brittany Fousheé – songwriting
- Diana Gordon – songwriting
- Matthew Castellanos – songwriting

== Charts ==
=== Weekly charts ===
Weekly chart performance
Chart (2022–2023)	Peak position
Australia (ARIA)	3
Canada Hot 100 (Billboard)	10
Canada CHR/Top 40 (Billboard)	25
Canada Hot AC (Billboard)	41
Czech Republic Singles Digital (ČNS IFPI)	72
Global 200 (Billboard)	8
Greece International (IFPI)	26
Iceland (Tónlistinn)	12
Ireland (IRMA)	9
Israel (Media Forest)	2
Japan Hot Overseas (Billboard Japan)	13
Lithuania (AGATA)	8
Netherlands (Single Top 100)	74
New Zealand (Recorded Music NZ)	2
Portugal (AFP)	41
Singapore (RIAS)	21
Slovakia (Singles Digitál Top 100)	44
South Africa Streaming (TOSAC)	34
Sweden (Sverigetopplistan)	49
Switzerland (Schweizer Hitparade)	69
UK Singles (Official Charts)	8
UK Hip Hop/R&B (Official Charts)	3
US Billboard Hot 100	1
US Adult Contemporary (Billboard)	28
US Adult Pop Airplay (Billboard)	11
US Hot R&B/Hip-Hop Songs (Billboard)	1
US R&B/Hip-Hop Airplay (Billboard)	34
US Hot Rock & Alternative Songs (Billboard)	1
US Pop Airplay (Billboard)	1
US Rhythmic Airplay (Billboard)	1
US Rock & Alternative Airplay (Billboard)	39

=== Year-end charts ===
Year-end chart performance
Chart (2022)	Position
Australia (ARIA)	24
Canada (Canadian Hot 100)	46
Global 200 (Billboard)	80
Lithuania (AGATA)	45
New Zealand (Recorded Music NZ)	40
UK Singles (OCC)	58
US Billboard Hot 100	28
US Hot R&B/Hip-Hop Songs (Billboard)	7
US Hot Rock & Alternative Songs (Billboard)	6
US Mainstream Top 40 (Billboard)	27
US Rhythmic (Billboard)	38

Year-end chart performance
Chart (2023)	Position
Australia (ARIA)	53
Global 200 (Billboard)	81
US Billboard Hot 100	39
US Hot R&B/Hip-Hop Songs (Billboard)	17
US Hot Rock & Alternative Songs (Billboard)	2
US Mainstream Top 40 (Billboard)	26
US Rhythmic (Billboard)	48

== Certifications ==
Certifications
Region	Certification	Certified units/sales
Australia (ARIA)	4× Platinum	280,000^{‡}
Austria (IFPI Austria)	Gold	15,000^{‡}
Canada (Music Canada)	2× Platinum	160,000^{‡}
Denmark (IFPI Danmark)	Gold	45,000^{‡}
France (SNEP)	Platinum	200,000^{‡}
Italy (FIMI)	Gold	50,000^{‡}
New Zealand (RMNZ)	4× Platinum	120,000^{‡}
Poland (ZPAV)	Platinum	50,000^{‡}
Portugal (AFP)	Platinum	10,000^{‡}
Spain (Promusicae)	Gold	30,000^{‡}
United Kingdom (BPI)	2× Platinum	1,200,000^{‡}
Streaming
Greece (IFPI Greece)	Gold	1,000,000^{†}
Sweden (GLF)	Gold	4,000,000^{†}
^{‡} Sales+streaming figures based on certification alone.^{†} Streaming-only figures based on certification alone.
