= Pride (Kendrick Lamar song) =

Song by Kendrick Lamar

from the album Damn
- Released: April 14, 2017
- Recorded: 2017
- Genre: Hip-hop; soul; psychedelic
- Length: 4:35
- Label: Top Dawg; Aftermath; Interscope
- Songwriters: Kendrick Duckworth; Steve Lacy; Anna Wise; Anthony Tiffith
- Producers: Lacy; Tiffith; Bēkon (add.)

"Pride" (stylized as "PRIDE.") is a song by American rapper Kendrick Lamar, taken from his fourth studio album Damn, released on April 14, 2017. The seventh track on the album (eighth on the Collector's Edition of Damn), the song was written by Lamar, Steve Lacy, Anna Wise, and Anthony Tiffith, and produced by Lacy and Tiffith, with additional production by Bēkon. "Pride" charted in multiple countries in 2017.

The song features background vocals from producer Steve Lacy and singer Anna Wise, the latter having previously collaborated with Lamar on "These Walls", which won her a Grammy Award for Best Rap/Sung Collaboration. In April 2023, the song was used at the end of the series finale of John Singleton's FX crime drama series Snowfall.

== Writing ==
The song features songwriting collaborations from American singer Anna Wise who, prior to her work on "Pride", won the Grammy Award for Best Rap/Sung Collaboration in 2016 with Lamar for his song "These Walls", from his third studio album To Pimp a Butterfly.

== Production ==
According to producer Steve Lacy, he created the beat for "Pride" on his iPhone 6. Lacy also said that before the song's release, it was originally titled "Wasn't There" before being renamed to "Pride".

The song has a tempo of 139 BPM and is in the key of E minor.

== Critical reception ==
The song has received critical acclaim from fans and critics alike. In a mixed review, Maeve McDermott of USA Today said the song was not that memorable, but its enjoyable mix of influences make it worth listening to. "Pride" is widely regarded as one of Kendrick Lamar's best songs.

== Lost verse ==
Shortly after the release of Damn, a lost handwritten verse from "Pride" was released by the co-president of Top Dawg Entertainment, Punch, on his Instagram page. The lost verse reads as follows:

Pride is my biggest sin
I tried to fight it but I never win
Lay'n myself down in the beds I made
Karma is always knockin with capital K's
It started when I was toss'n my life in the sand
Cross'n the street, momma don't you hold my hand
Time revealing itself
My ways are magnified
Same patterns requiring that I never camouflaged
Looking at me in shock you found my identity
Asking yourself do I have room 4 empathy
Everything is subject 2 change
But not me

== Live performances ==
Lamar performed "Pride" live at the Coachella Valley Music and Arts Festival on April 23, 2017.

== Credits and personnel ==
Credits adapted from the official Damn digital booklet.

- Kendrick Lamar – songwriter
- Steve Lacy – songwriter, producer, background vocals
- Anna Wise – songwriter, background vocals
- Anthony Tiffith – songwriter, producer
- Bēkon – additional production, additional vocals
- Derek Ali – mixing
- Tyler Page – mixing, mix assistant
- Cyrus Taghipour – mix assistant

== Charts ==
Chart (2017)	Peak position
Canada Hot 100 (Billboard)	32
Czech Republic Singles Digital (ČNS IFPI)	82
France (SNEP)	91
Ireland (IRMA)	35
Netherlands (Single Top 100)	67
New Zealand (Recorded Music NZ)	34
Portugal (AFP)	25
Slovakia Singles Digital (ČNS IFPI)	42
Sweden (Sverigetopplistan)	72
UK Singles (Official Charts)	49
US Billboard Hot 100	37
US Hot R&B/Hip-Hop Songs (Billboard)	22

== Certifications ==
Region	Certification	Certified units/sales
Australia (ARIA)	3× Platinum	210,000^{‡}
Canada (Music Canada)	Platinum	80,000^{‡}
Denmark (IFPI Danmark)	Gold	45,000^{‡}
France (SNEP)	Platinum	200,000^{‡}
New Zealand (RMNZ)	2× Platinum	60,000^{‡}
Poland (ZPAV)	Gold	25,000^{‡}
United Kingdom (BPI)	Platinum	600,000^{‡}
United States (RIAA)	Gold	500,000^{‡}
^{‡} Sales+streaming figures based on certification alone.
