= Hive Mind (The Internet album) =

Studio album by the Internet
- Released: July 20, 2018
- Recorded: 2017–18
- Genres: R&B; funk; hip-hop; jazz; quiet storm; blues
- Length: 57:49
- Label: Columbia
- Producer: The Internet

The Internet chronology
Ego Death (2015)	Hive Mind (2018)

Alternative cover
- Vinyl release

Singles from Hive Mind
- 1. "Roll (Burbank Funk)" Released: April 27, 2018; 2. "Come Over" Released: May 30, 2018; 3. "La Di Da" Released: July 13, 2018

Hive Mind is the fourth studio album by American R&B band the Internet, released on July 20, 2018, by Columbia Records. It was preceded by the singles "Roll (Burbank Funk)", "Come Over" and "La Di Da".

== Release and promotion ==
On April 27, 2018, the band released the single "Roll (Burbank Funk)", accompanied by a music video. On May 30, the group announced Hive Mind, to be released by Columbia Records on July 20, with the announcement accompanied by the release of the album's second promotional single, "Come Over". A music video for "Come Over" was released on June 6, serving as lead singer Syd's directorial debut. "La Di Da" was released as the album's third single on July 13.

== Critical reception ==
Professional ratings
Aggregate scores
Source	Rating
AnyDecentMusic?	7.9/10
Metacritic	83/100
Review scores
Source	Rating
AllMusic	3.5/5 stars
The A.V. Club	B
Entertainment Weekly	A
The Guardian	3/5 stars
The Independent	4/5 stars
NME	5/5 stars
The Observer	4/5 stars
Pitchfork	8.3/10
Rolling Stone	3.5/5 stars
Vice (Expert Witness)	A−

Hive Mind was met with widespread critical acclaim. At Metacritic, which assigns a normalized rating out of 100 to reviews from mainstream critics, the album received an average score of 83 based on 24 reviews. Carl Anka of NME gave the album five-out-of-five stars, claiming it to be "a towering demonstration of the collective intelligence of five artists approaching their zenith". A. Harmony of Exclaim! wrote about the band's growth saying "there are no weak links on this album: from the production to the songwriting, each Internet bandmate brings a polished, more mature sound to the fore." Jon Pareles of The New York Times praised the band's fusion of digitally processed and hand-played music, stating that the band "imperceptibly melds hand-played parts with loops and samples; whether or not it actually is, the music feels analog. Even where the drums are looped, the bass lines often drag and pull against the beat, breaking away from vamps to improvise and loosen things up."

=== Year-end rankings ===
Publication	Accolade	Rank	Ref.
GQ (Russia)	The 20 Best Albums of 2018	8	

== Track listing ==
No.	Title	Writer(s)	Lead vocal(s)	Length
1.	"Come Together"	Sydney Bennett; Steve Lacy	Bennett; Lacy	3:41
2.	"Roll (Burbank Funk)"	Bennett; Lacy; Patrick Paige II; Thorir Baldursson; Mats Bjoerklund; Jurgen Korduletsch	Lacy; Bennett	3:11
3.	"Come Over"	Bennett, Lacy, Martians	Bennett; Lacy	5:22
4.	"La Di Da"	Bennett; Lacy	Bennett; Lacy	3:27
5.	"Stay the Night"	Bennett; Lacy	Bennett	4:22
6.	"Bravo"	Bennett; Christopher Smith	Bennett	3:26
7.	"Mood"	Bennett; Lacy	Bennett	3:18
8.	"Next Time" / "Humble Pie"	Bennett; Lacy; Nick Green; Iman	Bennett	5:41
9.	"It Gets Better (With Time)"	Bennett; Lacy; Smith	Bennett; Ruben Bailey; Paige II	5:27
10.	"Look What U Started"	Bennett; Lacy; Green	Bennett	4:31
11.	"Wanna Be"	Bennett; Lacy	Bennett	4:27
12.	"Beat Goes On"	Matthew Martin; Lacy	Lacy; Martin	4:16
13.	"Hold On"	Bennett; Lacy; Smith; Nicholas Bennett	Bennett	6:46
Total length:				57:49

Japan bonus track
No.	Title	Length
14.	"Roll (Burbank Funk)" (KAYTRANADA Remix)	4:04
Total length:		61:59

=== Sample credits ===
- "Roll (Burbank Funk)" contains a sample of "Sing Sing", written and performed by Gaz.

== Personnel ==
=== The Internet ===
- Sydney Bennett – vocals (all tracks except for 12), drums (6)
- Steve Lacy – guitar (all tracks), bass (1, 3, 6–8, 10, 12, 13), background vocal (7, 8, 10–12), drums (1, 4), keyboards (8), synthesizer (8)
- Matthew Martin – keyboards (1, 3, 5, 7, 8, 11–13), drums (3, 5, 7–9, 12, 13), synthesizer (3, 8, 12, 13), percussion (6), background vocal (12)
- Patrick Paige – bass (1, 2, 4, 5, 8, 9, 11, 12), keyboards (2)
- Christopher Smith – drums (1, 11), percussion (5)

=== Additional musicians ===
- Moonchild – horn (1, 4, 7, 13)
- Ruben Bailey – vocal (9)
- Nick Green – background vocal (1, 2, 4)
- Durand Bernarr – background vocal (1)
- Marcus Lee – background vocal (12)
- Gaz – drums (2)
- Kari Faux – percussion (13)

=== Engineers ===
- Sydney Bennett – recording
- Simon Berckelman – recording (11–13)
- Jonny Firth – recording (1)
- Matthew Martin – recording (12)
- Jimmy Douglass – mixing
- Dave Kutch – mastering

== Charts ==
Chart (2018)	Peak position
Australian Albums (ARIA)	40
Belgian Albums (Ultratop Flanders)	45
Dutch Albums (Album Top 100)	53
Japanese Albums (Oricon)	86
Swiss Albums (Schweizer Hitparade)	86
UK Albums (Official Charts)	39
US Billboard 200	26
US Top R&B/Hip-Hop Albums (Billboard)	14
