= Dark Red (song) =

Single by Steve Lacy

from the album Steve Lacy's Demo
- Released: February 20, 2017 (Original release on EP); April 4, 2019 (Single release)
- Recorded: 2017
- Genre: Alternative R&B; neo soul; funk
- Length: 2:53
- Label: 3QTR; RCA Records
- Songwriter: Steve Lacy
- Producer: Steve Lacy

"Dark Red" is a song by American musician Steve Lacy. The track was solely written and produced by Lacy and was initially featured on his 2017 debut solo EP (Note: While digital streaming platforms like Spotify and Apple Music classify the project as an EP, Lacy has explicitly stated that he considers it a "song series" rather than an album or an EP.), Steve Lacy's Demo.

The song achieved commercial success in North America several years after its initial release. The song is considered a sleeper hit. In the United States, "Dark Red" peaked at number 78 on the Billboard Hot 100 in October 2022. It also charted on Billboards genre-specific listings, including reaching number four on both the Hot R&B Songs chart and the Rock Streaming Songs chart in September 2021. In Canada, the song reached number 71 on the Canadian Hot 100. The song had over 2 billion streams on Spotify, being Lacy's most streamed song as of July 2026.

== Release history ==
| Region | Date | Format | Label | Ref. |
|---|---|---|---|---|
| Various | February 20, 2017 | Digital download; streaming | 3qtr | |
| Various | February 20, 2017 | Digital EP (Steve Lacy's Demo) | 3qtr | |
| United States | 2020 | Vinyl (via The Lo-Fis compilation) | L-M Records | |

== Reception ==
The song, along with the rest of the Steve Lacy's Demo EP, was frequently noted for its unique production method. It was written and recorded entirely by Lacy using the GarageBand application on his iPhone. The songs production has been highlighted by publications such as iNews.

Critically, the track has been described in the context of Lacy's overall musical style, which Saint Heron characterized as "an electrifying yet smooth playful depiction of beachy funk, rock 'n roll-sprinkled soul". Reviewers often highlighted the track's combination of "raw instrumentation and perfectly cleaned/engineered vocals". The song's lo-fi quality, stemming from the small-scale production, was noted for the sense of connection it established with listeners. Geeks of Color pointed out the track's blend of "twangy guitar and his raspy, yet angelic harmonies". This blending was summarized by the observation that his style is like "plaid, because 'there's so much going on, but it doesn't clash'".

Lyrically, "Dark Red" was interpreted as a "Baby, we can work it out" song. The track features a theme of making amends in a difficult relationship and contemplating a potential breakup.

== Charts ==
Weekly chart performance for "Dark Red"
| Chart (2021–2022) | Peak position |
|---|---|
| Australia (ARIA) | 69 |
| Canada Hot 100 (Billboard) | 71 |
| Global 200 (Billboard) | 132 |
| Greece International (IFPI) | 50 |
| Ireland (IRMA) | 95 |
| Netherlands (Single Tip) | 22 |
| UK Indie (OCC) | 6 |
| UK Streaming (OCC) | 96 |
| US Billboard Hot 100 | 78 |
| US Hot R&B/Hip-Hop Songs (Billboard) | 21 |
| US Hot Rock & Alternative Songs (Billboard) | 9 |

== Certifications ==
Certifications
| Region | Certification | Certified units/sales |
|---|---|---|
| New Zealand (RMNZ) | 3× Platinum | 90,000^{‡} |
| United Kingdom (BPI) | 2× Platinum | 1,200,000^{‡} |
| United States (RIAA) | Platinum | 1,000,000^{‡} |
Streaming
| Greece (IFPI Greece) | Gold | 1,000,000^{†} |
^{‡} Sales+streaming figures based on certification alone.^{†} Streaming-only figures based on certification alone.
