= Crush (EP) =

EP by Ravyn Lenae
- Released: February 9, 2018
- Recorded: 2017
- Genre: R&B; neo soul
- Length: 16:33
- Label: Atlantic; Three Twenty Three
- Producer: Steve Lacy (also exec.)

Ravyn Lenae chronology
Midnight Moonlight (2017)	Crush (2018)	Hypnos (2022)

Singles from Crush
- 1. "Sticky" Released: December 8, 2017; 2. "4 Leaf Clover" Released: April 24, 2018

Crush is the third extended play by American singer and songwriter Ravyn Lenae. It was released on 9 February 2018.

== Background ==
The EP is entirely produced by Steve Lacy, and includes vocals from him. Ravyn Lenae described the EP as a coming-of-age project and said "the melodies are different, just my approach to certain topics are more blunt, and that's a matter of the sound that's changed, and also me being older. I don't have to hide certain things anymore in my music. I'm feeling a little more confident in who I am and my experiences."

== Singles and promotion ==
On 8 December 2017, she released "Sticky" as the first single for this EP. On January 23, the music video was released. To further promote the single, she appeared on MTV's Total Request Live and performed the track. A second single, "4 Leaf Clover", as well as a visual, were released on April 24.

== Accolades ==
Gothamist included Crush in its 33-best-albums-of-2018 year-end list.

== Track listing ==
All tracks are written by Ravyn Lenae and Steve Lacy, and produced by Lacy.

No.	Title	Length
1.	"Sticky"	3:16
2.	"Closer (Ode 2 U)"	3:16
3.	"Computer Luv" (featuring Steve Lacy)	2:42
4.	"The Night Song"	3:39
5.	"4 Leaf Clover" (featuring Steve Lacy)	3:40
Total length:		16:33
