= Steve Lacy's Demo =

Recording by Steve Lacy
- Released: February 24, 2017
- Genre: Soul; funk
- Length: 13:33
- Label: Three Quarter; AWAL
- Producer: Steve Lacy

Steve Lacy chronology
Steve Lacy's Demo (2017)	Apollo XXI (2019)

Singles from Steve Lacy's Demo
- 1. "Some" Released: November 1, 2016; 2. "Dark Red" Released: February 20, 2017

Steve Lacy's Demo is a commercial release (Note: Steve Lacy has said that Steve Lacy's Demo is a song series, neither an album nor an EP.) by American musician Steve Lacy. It was released on February 24, 2017, by Three Quarter (3Qtr) and AWAL. The project has been described by Lacy as a song series.

== Background ==
Lacy created most of the song-series on his iPhone, producing the guitar and bass arrangements and singing his vocals right into its built-in microphone. He also programmed the drum patterns in Ableton.

== In popular culture ==
In August 2021, the song, "Dark Red", went viral on TikTok, with videos featuring the song reaching over 110K views as of February 2022.

== Critical reception ==
Professional ratings
Review scores
Source	Rating
Pitchfork	7.4/10

Steve Lacy's Demo received positive reviews from music critics. Jonah Bromwich of Pitchfork said, "[Steve Lacy] sparkles with classic Southern California funk and soul... the music here is startlingly mature, full of dimension and depth, as if Lacy were accompanied by a full band rather than doing everything, right down to the mixing, by his lonesome." Kareem Sheikh of DJ Booth said, "Demo's six tracks are cohesive in both their smooth, sultry sound and their theme of young love... [Demo] is fun, youthful and intimate, and is sure to convert any [The] Internet lover into a budding Steve Lacy fanboy." Makeda Sandford of Saint Heron stated that, "[Steve Lacy's Demo] is an electrifying yet smooth thirteen minutes – a playful depiction of beachy funk, rock 'n roll-sprinkled soul."

== Track listing ==
All songs written and produced by Lacy.

Steve Lacy's Demo track listing
No.	Title	Length
1.	"Looks"	1:31
2.	"Ryd"	2:20
3.	"Dark Red"	2:53
4.	"Thangs"	1:50
5.	"Haterlovin"	1:56
6.	"Some"	3:00
Total length:		13:13

Note

- The track "Moron" was cut from the tracklist, but was self-released for free on April 1, 2017.

== Certifications ==
Certifications for Steve Lacy's Demo
Region	Certification	Certified units/sales
New Zealand (RMNZ)	Gold	7,500^{‡}
^{‡} Sales+streaming figures based on certification alone.
