= Nice Shoes (song) =

Promotional single by Steve Lacy

from the album Oh Yeah?
- Released: August 15, 2025
- Length: 3:15
- Label: RCA
- Songwriter: Steve Lacy
- Producers: Steve Lacy; Matthew Castellanos; Nicholas Weiss

Lyric video
- "Nice Shoes" on YouTube

"Nice Shoes" is a song released by American musician Steve Lacy. It was released on August 15, 2025, and is the first promotional single from his third album Oh Yeah? (2026).

== Background and release ==
On August 14, 2025, Steve Lacy took to Instagram to announce "Nice Shoes", which would appear on his third album Oh Yeah? The album was officially released on July 17, 2026.

== Charts ==
Weekly chart performance for "Nice Shoes"
Chart (2025)	Peak position
New Zealand Hot Singles (RMNZ)	11
