= The Feeling (Steve Lacy song) =

Single by Steve Lacy

from the album Oh Yeah?
- Released: June 5, 2026
- Length: 4:36
- Label: RCA; L-M
- Songwriters: Steve Lacy; Alice Smith; Matthew Castellanos
- Producers: Steve Lacy; Nicholas Weiss

Steve Lacy singles chronology
"Helmet" (2023)	"The Feeling" (2026)	"Oh Yeah?" (2026)

Music video
- "The Feeling" on YouTube

"The Feeling" (stylized in all lowercase) is a song by American musician Steve Lacy. It was released on June 5, 2026, as the lead single from his third studio album, Oh Yeah? (2026).

== Composition and lyrics ==
The song is an acoustic ballad with funk undertones, featuring a subdued bassline and "angelic" vocals. Emily Zemler of Rolling Stone described "The Feeling" as an anthemic and "emotionally-wrought" song about a troubled relationship: "I’m not scared to bleed, you know our history." NME's Damian Jones called it a "moody synth single". In a Stereogum article, Margaret Farrell compared the song to a "stagnant wound", finding it to be "drenched in longing" and addressing unrequited love.

== Release ==
On May 26, 2026, Lacy previewed a snippet of its song on Instagram. It was released a few days later, on June 5, as the lead single from his third studio album, Oh Yeah? (2026). The release was accompanied with a music video directed by Matthew Castellanos.

== Charts ==
Weekly chart performance for "The Feeling"
Chart (2026)	Peak position
Australia (ARIA)	96
Australia Hip Hop/R&B (ARIA)	13
Canada Hot 100 (Billboard)	63
New Zealand Hot Singles (RMNZ)	4
US Billboard Hot 100	61
US Hot R&B/Hip-Hop Songs (Billboard)	11
US Hot Rock & Alternative Songs (Billboard)	13
