= Apollo XXI =

Studio album by Steve Lacy
- Released: May 24, 2019
- Recorded: 2017–2019
- Studio: Paramore Palace
- Genre: Pop; funk; R&B; indie rock; lo-fi
- Length: 43:00
- Label: Three Quarter; AWAL
- Producer: Steve Lacy

Steve Lacy chronology
Steve Lacy's Demo (2017)	Apollo XXI (2019)	The Lo-Fis (2020)

Singles from Apollo XXI
- 1. "N Side" Released: April 8, 2019; 2. "Playground" Released: May 21, 2019; 3. "Hate CD" Released: May 23, 2019

Apollo XXI (21) is the debut studio album by American musician Steve Lacy. It was released on May 24, 2019, by Three Quarter (3Qtr) and AWAL. It was preceded by the singles "N Side", "Playground", and "Hate CD".

Apollo XXI garnered widespread critical acclaim. Named as one of the best releases of 2019, critics praised its originality, cohesiveness and introspective lyricism. Thematically, the album explores Lacy's sexuality and coming out. Apollo XXI was nominated for Best Urban Contemporary Album at the 62nd Annual Grammy Awards, Lacy's first Grammy nomination as a solo artist.

== Background ==
Lacy started working on the album in 2017, recording in his younger sister's bedroom (which he named Paramore Palace) after she left for college, in between sessions he had with other artists and touring with his band, the Internet. He also said he recorded much of the album using other methods than an iPod or iPhone. The song "Like Me" was written and recorded in July 2017, after a period in which Lacy said he hadn't written any music because of the emotions and fears he had expressing his sexuality. The song features Daisy Hamel-Buffa, who said they talked about their sexualities together in 2017 and Lacy later asked her to sing on the track.

== Singles and promotion ==
On April 8, 2019, Lacy released the lead single from Apollo XXI, "N Side". The song was released after the Internet announced that two solo albums from unnamed band members had been completed. On May 16, he announced the title and revealed the cover art of the album. On May 21, he released the second single titled "Playground" and revealed the track list of the album. A final single, "Hate CD", was released hours before the album debuted.

== Critical reception ==
Professional ratings
Aggregate scores
Source	Rating
Metacritic	81/100
Review scores
Source	Rating
The Guardian	4/5 stars
NME	4/5 stars
Exclaim!	9/10
Pitchfork	6.9/10

Apollo XXI received critical acclaim from reviewers. Donna-Claire Chesman of DJ Booth states, "... Steve Lacy, in all his funk and R&B glory, is here to satisfy—and satisfy he does. Lacy's astral cool vocals are splashed against a bevy of tugging instrumentals; you're pulled into his orbit, at first struggling to hear him, and then, struggling to imagine ever not hearing his themes... Apollo XXI is a fabulous clinic in mood." Natty Kasambala for NME felt that "[Lacy] balances wistful musical throwbacks with authentic lyricism and attitude... From the get-go, [Apollo XXI] delivers exactly what it promises with its stylish, nostalgic artwork: a distinct world filled with hazy strings, warped synths and vocals that range from a flawless '70s-style falsetto to laid-back speech. It's retro-inspired through a modern lens." Salvatore Maicki of The Fader wrote, "Apollo XXI isn't just his debut album — it's his first definitive statement. Loosely tied together as an intergalactic mission, the album moves with the viscosity of a lava lamp... it's an impressively cohesive introduction to an artist coming into his own."

Ben Beaumont-Thomas, of The Guardian, compared certain songs to the likes of Prince, D'Angelo, Maxwell, and Sly and the Family Stone. Nathan Smith of Pitchfork stated, "The singer and guitarist's debut solo album offers an introspective blend of R&B, hip-hop, & lo-fi pop but feels reluctant to claim the spotlight... For an album whose highlight is a song about the urge to extend beyond the limits of your own experience and find solace in collective acceptance, it all feels surprisingly timid. Apollo XXI is centered on the interior self, but it's not self-centered". August Brown of the Los Angeles Times wrote, "With Apollo XXI, Lacy's finally come into his own as a solo artist, one straddling R&B, indie rock and his own idiosyncrasies. [Apollo XXI] has a relaxed, lived-in skillfulness that shows the handiwork of a veteran player... it's quintessentially L.A. in its mix of retro funk, twitchy beat music and even occasional canyon-rock vibes."

== Track listing ==
All songs written and produced by Steve Lacy, unless otherwise noted.

No.	Title	Writer(s)	Length
1.	"Only If"		1:40
2.	"Like Me" (featuring DAISY WORLD)	Steve Lacy; Daisy	9:04
3.	"Playground"	S. Lacy; Jesse Boykins III	3:33
4.	"Basement Jack"		1:49
5.	"Guide"		2:21
6.	"Lay Me Down"		3:03
7.	"Hate CD"		2:40
8.	"In Lust We Trust"		2:00
9.	"Love 2 Fast"		3:42
10.	"Amandla's Interlude"	S. Lacy; Amandla Stenberg	3:10
11.	"N Side"		3:44
12.	"Outro Freestyle/4ever"		6:14
Total length:			43:00

Bonus Track for Japan
No.	Title	Writer(s)	Length
13.	"The Night Howl" (featuring Asia Lacy)	S. Lacy; Asia Lacy	3:31
Total length:			46:31

Note

- "Amandla's Interlude" contains additional vocals from ABRA.
- "Outro Freestyle/4ever" contains additional vocals from Valerie Lacy, Valyn Spottsville, and Asia Lacy.

== Charts ==
Chart (2019)	Peak position
France Downloads Albums (SNEP)	115
US Billboard 200	160
US Heatseekers Albums (Billboard)	19
US Top R&B Albums (Billboard)	15
