= Steve Lacy =

American musician (born 1998)

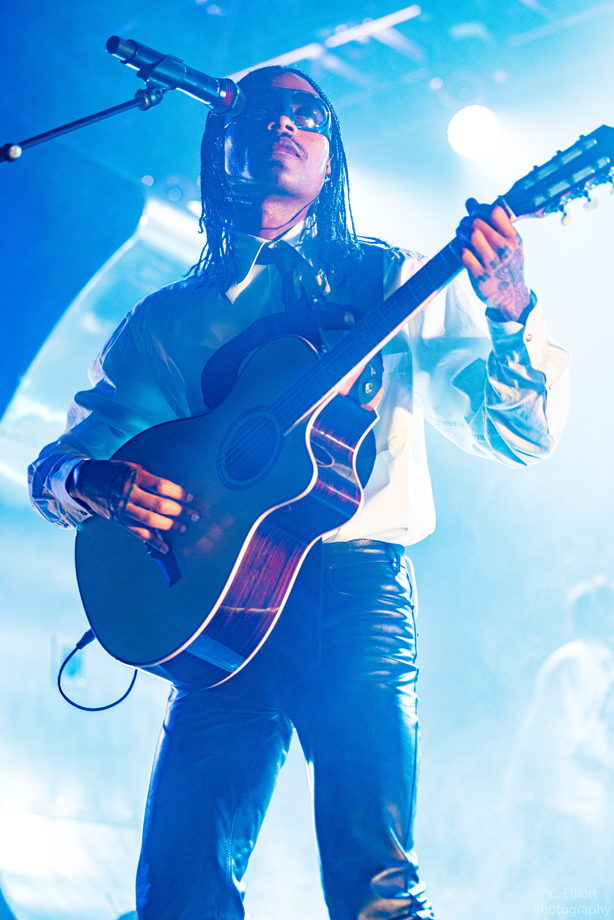
- Lacy in October 2022

Background information
- Born: Steve Thomas Lacy-Moya; May 23, 1998 (age 28); Compton, California, U.S.
- Genres: R&B; neo soul; funk; psychedelia
- Occupations: Singer; songwriter; record producer; guitarist
- Instruments: Vocals; guitar; bass; drums; keyboards; percussion; sampler
- Works: Steve Lacy discography
- Years active: 2013–present
- Labels: RCA; Three Quarter; AWAL; L-M
- Member of: The Internet
- Website: wearesteve.net

Steve Thomas Lacy-Moya (born May 23, 1998) is an American singer-songwriter, guitarist and record producer. He gained recognition as the guitarist of the alternative R&B band the Internet, which he joined in 2015. His self-produced debut EP, Steve Lacy's Demo (2017), was met with critical praise and became a sleeper hit. Lacy then guest performed alongside Frank Ocean on Tyler, the Creator's 2017 single "911 / Mr. Lonely", which received double platinum certification by the Recording Industry Association of America (RIAA). That year, he also co-wrote songs for artists including Solange Knowles, and Kendrick Lamar on his song "Pride".

His debut studio album, Apollo XXI (2019), earned a Grammy Award nomination for Best Urban Contemporary Album. That same year, he guest appeared on Vampire Weekend's single "Sunflower", as well as Calvin Harris' song "Live Without Your Love", which entered the UK Singles Chart. He signed with RCA Records to release his second studio album Gemini Rights (2022), which peaked within the top ten of the Billboard 200 chart and spawned the single "Bad Habit". The song peaked atop the Billboard Hot 100 after going viral on TikTok; it was nominated for Best Pop Solo Performance, Record of the Year and Song of the Year at the 65th Annual Grammy Awards, while its parent album won Best Progressive R&B Album. He was named one of the 100 most influential people in the world by Time magazine in 2023. His third studio album, Oh Yeah? (2026), featured collaborations with SZA and Erykah Badu.

== Early life ==
Steve Thomas Lacy-Moya was born in Compton, California, on May 23, 1998, the son of a Black American mother and Filipino father. He was raised by his mother and grew up with his sister Asia Lacy (Asiatica), with his father being largely absent from his life and usually visiting only on special occasions. When Lacy was ten years old, his father died. Lacy attended Narbonne High School before moving on to a private school. Lacy has said that he grew up sheltered, a result of his mother wanting to shield him and his sisters from the environment in Compton.

== Career ==
Lacy first gained an interest in the guitar at the age of seven through the video game Guitar Hero. He met Jameel Bruner, his future bandmate in the Internet, while in jazz band in high school. He produced and performed his first songs on his iPhone, using the app GarageBand, he also used a plug-in for his guitar called an iRig. In 2013, he began a producing role on what would become the Internet's third studio album, Ego Death. Contributing on the production of eight tracks, Ego Death was nominated at the 58th Annual Grammy Awards for Best Urban Contemporary Album. Lacy appeared on Matt Martians' album The Drum Chord Theory and Syd's album Fin after it was announced that the Internet members would release solo projects. He also began producing songs for Twenty88, Denzel Curry, Isaiah Rashad, J. Cole, GoldLink, and Kendrick Lamar, most notably co-producing the song "Pride" from Lamar's Grammy-winning album Damn, and making two guest appearances on the Vampire Weekend album Father of the Bride.

Steve Lacy's Demo was released on February 15, 2017, with Lacy once again creating most of the songs on his iPhone by producing the guitar and bass arrangements through it and singing his vocals directly into its built-in microphone. He also programmed the drum patterns in Ableton Live. That year, he also co-wrote and produced Ravyn Lenae's EP Crush, which was eventually released in February 2018. He reunited with the Internet to work on their album Hive Mind, which was released in July 2018. Lacy went on to produce for Solange, Kali Uchis on her debut album Isolation, Mac Miller on his album Swimming, and was featured on Dev Hynes' album Negro Swan.

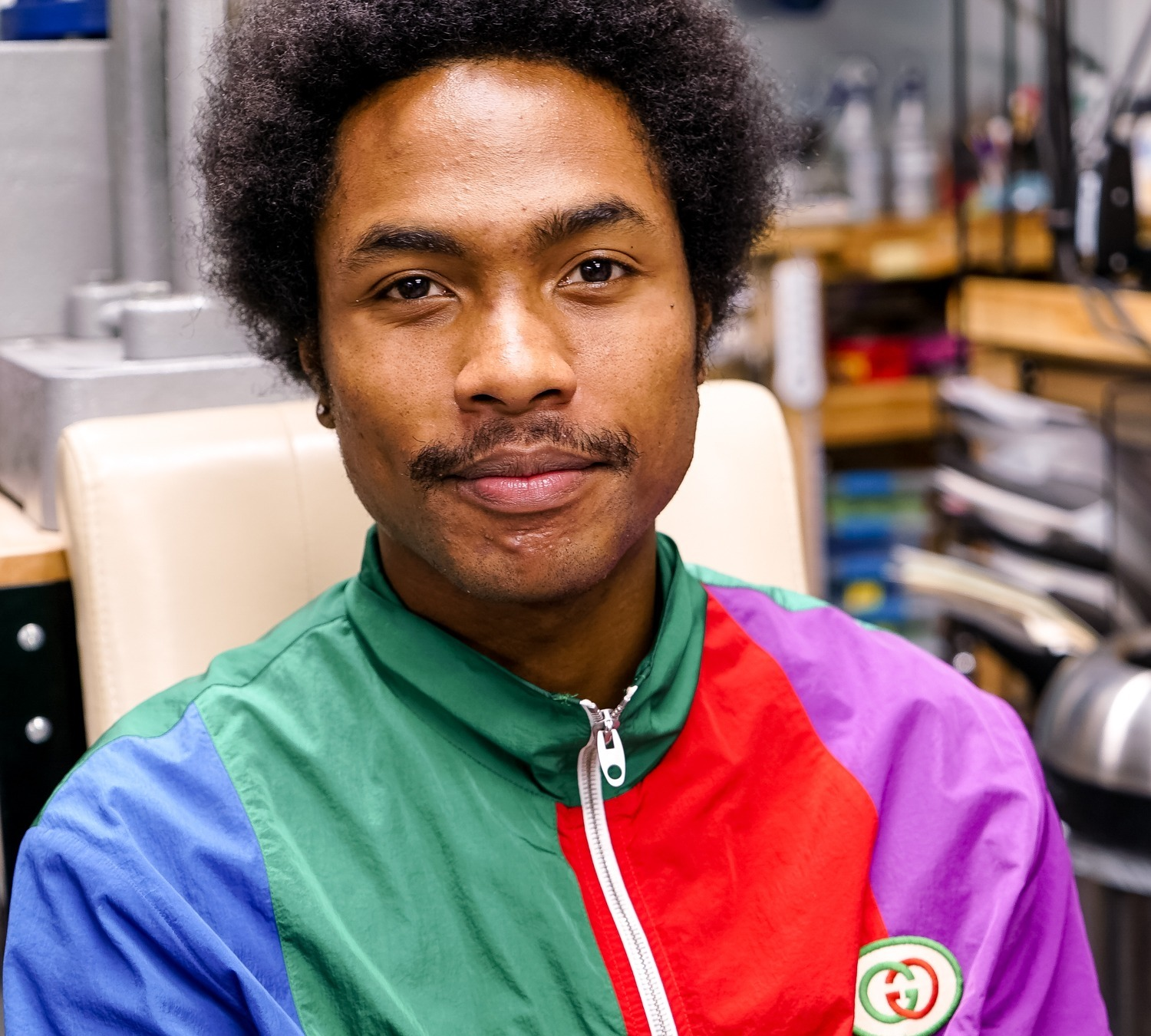
Lacy in 2019

In 2018, Lacy said that he had produced for rapper YG, and that he had begun using devices other than his phone to produce music. In March 2019, he was credited for producing on two tracks on Solange's album When I Get Home. He was also featured on the Vampire Weekend song "Sunflower" and appeared its video that same month. In April, he released the single "N Side" from his debut album Apollo XXI. He announced the release date of Apollo XXI to be on May 24, 2019. In the week of his album debut, he released two more singles, "Playground" and "Hate CD". The album was nominated for Best Urban Contemporary Album at the 62nd Annual Grammy Awards, Lacy's first Grammy nomination as a solo artist.

On December 4, 2020, Lacy released a compilation album of his early work titled The Lo-Fis. His single "Mercury" was released with a music video on June 16, 2022. The video featured on YouTube is about half as long as the version published on Spotify, which spans 4:58 minutes compared to the 2:30 minutes of the video. His second studio album, Gemini Rights, was released on July 15, 2022. The album spawned the single "Bad Habit", which became Lacy's first song to reach number one on the Billboard Hot 100 after going viral on TikTok, where a snippet of the song was used as the soundtrack for over 400,000 videos on the platform. On November 5, 2022, he performed "Bad Habit" and "Helmet" on Saturday Night Live.

On January 31, 2023, AEG (Anschutz Entertainment Group) Presents announced that Lacy would be one of three headline acts at the inaugural Re:SET Concert Series.

In early 2024, Lacy performed at the touring St Jerome's Laneway Festival in Australia and New Zealand, and played headline sideshows that included two in-the-round performances at the Sydney Opera House.

On August 15, 2025, Steve Lacy returned with his first solo single in three years, "Nice Shoes". The song serves as the lead single for his third studio album Oh Yeah? The single's release coincided with Lacy's Rolling Stone cover story, in which he revealed the album's title and discussed its creation.

On June 3, 2026, Steve Lacy revealed the cover art for Oh Yeah?. The cover was photographed by filmmaker Gus Van Sant. On June 5, 2026, the second single from Oh Yeah?, "The Feeling", was released. The album was released on July 17, 2026.

On June 26, 2026, Lacy released the album's third single, "Is It Cool?", a duet with SZA; the song debuted at number 52 on the Billboard Hot 100. Oh Yeah?, which also features guest appearances by Erykah Badu and Cecile Believe, received generally favorable reviews, holding a weighted average score of 72 out of 100 on the review aggregator Metacritic based on seven critics. Jeff Ihaza of Rolling Stone wrote that the record cemented Lacy's status as one of the leading pop auteurs of his generation, while Pitchfork offered a more mixed assessment. Commercially, the album opened at number 14 on the Billboard 200 with 33,000 album-equivalent units, and entered the top five of Billboard's Top R&B Albums chart. To promote the album, Lacy scheduled a run of tour dates across Asia during the summer of 2026, including headline festival slots at Summer Sonic in Japan and LaLaLa Fest in the Philippines and Indonesia.

On September 27, 2026, The Oh Yeah? Tour spans 27 North American cities, routing east to west from Minneapolis through Chicago, Canada, New York, the East Coast, the South, Texas, the Rockies, and the West Coast, closing in Vancouver. The setlist follows a two-act structure. Act 1 presents the full Oh yeah? album in sequence, and Act 2 draws from Lacy’s back catalog including Gemini Rights, Apollo XXI, and earlier releases.

== Artistry ==
In an interview with The Fader, Lacy cited Thundercat, Erykah Badu, Black Moth Super Rainbow, Pharrell Williams and the Neptunes as some of his biggest influences, also mentioning Prince as his dream collaborator. Lacy has also listed Weezer, Paramore, and Jimi Hendrix as major influences on his sound. Makeda Sandford of Saint Heron described his sound as "an electrifying yet smooth... playful depiction of beachy funk, rock 'n roll-sprinkled soul." Jonah Bromwich of Pitchfork said he "sparkles with classic Southern California funk and soul." He has also stated that one of his biggest influences, in regard to production, is Mac DeMarco. Lacy has said that he is most comfortable writing about topics regarding love and dating, and describes his musical sound to be like the tartan fabric 'plaid'.

== Personal life ==
In 2017, Lacy came out as bisexual. As of 2026, Lacy resides in Los Angeles.

== Discography ==
=== Studio albums ===
- Apollo XXI (2019)
- Gemini Rights (2022)
- Oh Yeah? (2026)

=== With the Internet ===
- Ego Death (2015)
- Hive Mind (2018)

== Awards and nominations ==
Organization	Year	Category	Nominated work	Result	Ref.
American Music Awards	2022	New Artist of the Year	Himself	Nominated	
American Music Awards	2022	Favorite Male R&B Artist	Himself	Nominated	
BET Awards	2023	Video of the Year	"Bad Habit"	Nominated	
GLAAD Media Awards	2023	Outstanding Breakthrough Music Artist	Himself	Nominated	
Grammy Awards	2016	Best Urban Contemporary Album	Ego Death	Nominated	
Grammy Awards	2020	Best Urban Contemporary Album	Apollo XXI	Nominated	
Grammy Awards	2023	Record of the Year	"Bad Habit"	Nominated	
Grammy Awards	2023	Song of the Year	"Bad Habit"	Nominated	
Grammy Awards	2023	Best Pop Solo Performance	"Bad Habit"	Nominated	
Grammy Awards	2023	Best Progressive R&B Album	Gemini Rights	Won	
iHeartRadio Music Awards	2023	Best New Pop Artist	Himself	Nominated	
iHeartRadio Music Awards	2023	TikTok Bop of the Year	"Bad Habit"	Nominated	
iHeartRadio Music Awards	2023	Best New R&B Artist	Himself	Nominated	
MTV Europe Music Awards	2023	Best R&B	Himself	Nominated	
MTV Video Music Awards	2022	Song of Summer	"Bad Habit"	Nominated	
MTV Video Music Awards	2023	Song of the Year	"Bad Habit"	Nominated	
Soul Train Music Awards	2022	Best New Artist	Himself	Nominated	
Soul Train Music Awards	2022	Song of the Year	"Bad Habit"	Nominated	
Soul Train Music Awards	2022	Video of the Year	"Bad Habit"	Nominated	
Soul Train Music Awards	2022	The Ashford & Simpson Songwriter's Award	"Bad Habit"	Nominated	
UK Music Video Awards	2022	Best R&B/Soul Video – International	"Sunshine"	Nominated	
UK Music Video Awards	2023	Best R&B/Soul Video – International	"Helmet"	Nominated	
