= I'm Up (song) =

Single by Omarion featuring French Montana and Kid Ink
- Released: June 18, 2015
- Recorded: 2015
- Genre: Hip hop; R&B
- Length: 3:21
- Label: Maybach Music; Atlantic
- Songwriters: Omarion Grandberry; Christopher Toler; Brian Collins; Karim Kharbouch; Nicholas Balding
- Producer: Nic Nac

Omarion singles chronology
"Post to Be" (2014)	"I'm Up" (2015)	"I'm Sayin'" (2015)

French Montana singles chronology
"Bad Bitch" (2014)	"I'm Up" (2015)	"Moses" (2015)

Kid Ink singles chronology
"Be Real" (2015)	"I'm Up" (2015)	"Baby's In Love" (2015)

"I'm Up" is a song by American recording artist Omarion, originally intended as the lead single for his unreleased studio album Passport (2020). The track features verses by American rappers French Montana and Kid Ink. Production is handled by American record producer Nic Nac.

== Background ==
The song premiered on the radio station Power 106 June 16, 2015, and was released for digital download on June 18. The song was produced by Nic Nac who previously also produced "Loyal" and "Ayo" by Chris Brown and Tyga.

== Music video ==
The official music video premiered August 27, 2015 on Vevo.

== Critical reception ==
Upon release, "I'm Up" was well received by music critics. Rap-Up called the guest appearances of Ink and Montana "playful". Music Times called the song "new summer anthem", also adding that "Montana comes through with auto-tune and Ink spits some catchy bars". Candice Jones of Essence also gave a positive review to the song, writing, "It's a summer jam that is sure to have you dancing in your car or at your desk." Peneliope Richards of Respect. stated that the song is not far away from being a summer hit, since the production is reminiscent of Chris Brown’s "Loyal".

== Charts ==
Chart (2015)	Peak position
US Bubbling Under Hot 100 (Billboard)	9
US Hot R&B/Hip-Hop Songs (Billboard)	41
US Rhythmic Airplay (Billboard)	29
US R&B/Hip-Hop Airplay (Billboard)	17

== Certifications ==
certifications for "I'm Up"
Region	Certification	Certified units/sales
New Zealand (RMNZ)	Gold	15,000^{‡}
^{‡} Sales+streaming figures based on certification alone.
