= Bitches N Marijuana =

Single by Chris Brown and Tyga featuring Schoolboy Q

from the album Fan of a Fan: The Album
- Released: May 26, 2015
- Recorded: 2014
- Genre: West Coast hip hop; gangsta rap; R&B
- Length: 4:14
- Label: RCA; Young Money; Cash Money; Republic
- Songwriters: Chris Brown; Michael Stevenson; Paris Jones; Quincy Hanley; Nicholas Balding
- Producer: Nic Nac

Chris Brown singles chronology
"How Many Times" (2015)	"Bitches N Marijuana" (2015)	"All Eyes on You" (2015)

Tyga singles chronology
"Ayo" (2015)	"Bitches N Marijuana" (2015)	"Ride Out" (2016)

Schoolboy Q singles chronology
"Hell of a Night" (2014)	"Bitches N Marijuana" (2015)	"THat Part" (2016)

Music video
- "Bitches N Marijuana" on YouTube

"Bitches N Marijuana" (edited for radio as "B****es N Marijuana") is a song by American recording artists Chris Brown and Tyga. It was released on May 26, 2015, as the second single from their second collaborative effort, a studio album titled Fan of a Fan: The Album (2015). The song features a guest appearance from West Coast rapper Schoolboy Q.

== Composition ==
"Bitches N Marijuana" is a West Coast hip hop song, with braggadocious lyrics about a promiscuous gangsta lifestyle filled with sex, money and marijuana. The track's production was handled by Nic Nac, and XXL described it as synth-driven, featuring the producer's signature claps, reminiscent of Brown's 2014 song "Loyal". Each artist on the song performs a rap verse, with Brown singing its chorus with "silky" vocals.

== Music video ==
The music video for the song was directed by Colin Tilley, and released on June 18, 2015. In the beginning of the video, Brown phone calls Tyga, while they're both laying in bed with some girls in their respective houses, smoking marijuana (The intro is the ending to the previous track, Real One). They both decide to organize and execute a party filled with women, cash and marijuana. HotNewHipHop stated that the video is "backed by its dark ambiance & vibrant lights".

== Charts ==
Chart performance for "Bitches N Marijuana"
Chart (2015)	Peak position
Australia (ARIA)	49
Belgium (Ultratip Bubbling Under Flanders)	91
France (SNEP)	139
Germany (GfK)	50
UK Singles (Official Charts)	60
US Bubbling Under Hot 100 (Billboard)	3
US Hot R&B/Hip-Hop Songs (Billboard)	33
US R&B/Hip-Hop Airplay (Billboard)	39

== Certifications ==
Certifications for "Bitches N Marijuana"
Region	Certification	Certified units/sales
Australia (ARIA)	Platinum	70,000^{‡}
New Zealand (RMNZ)	Platinum	30,000^{‡}
United Kingdom (BPI)	Silver	200,000^{‡}
United States (RIAA)	Gold	500,000^{‡}
^{‡} Sales+streaming figures based on certification alone.
