= Shine (Wale album) =

Studio album by Wale
- Released: April 28, 2017
- Recorded: 2015–2017
- Genre: Hip-hop
- Length: 55:20
- Labels: Every Blue Moon; Maybach; Atlantic
- Producers: 808-Ray; Big Ghost; Ced Brown; Christian Rich; Cool & Dre; Diplo; DJ Money; DJ Spinz; Don Cannon; Dreamlife; Go Grizzly; Kane Beatz; Majestic Drama; Lee Major; Marcè Reazon; Nez & Rio; The Picard Brothers; Pro Reese; Sean Momberger; Super Miles; Spinz Beats, Inc.; The Dope Boyz; Vinay

Wale chronology
Summer on Sunset (2016)	Shine (2017)	Wow... That's Crazy (2019)

Singles from Shine
- 1. "My PYT" Released: May 20, 2016; 2. "Running Back" Released: January 20, 2017; 3. "Fashion Week" Released: February 24, 2017; 4. "Fish N Grits" Released: April 6, 2017

Shine (an abbreviation of Still Here Ignoring Negative Energy) is the fifth studio album by American rapper Wale. It was released on April 28, 2017, by his label, Every Blue Moon, distributed by Maybach Music Group and Atlantic Records. The production on the album was handled by multiple producers including Cool & Dre, Kane Beatz, Diplo, Lee Major, Nez & Rio and Christian Rich among others. The album also features guest appearances by Dua Lipa, Chris Brown, Travis Scott, Lil Wayne, Wizkid, J Balvin and G-Eazy among others.

Shine was supported by four singles: "My PYT", "Running Back", "Fashion Week" and "Fish N Grits". The album received generally mixed reviews from music critics and achieved small commercial success. It debuted at number 16 on the US Billboard 200 chart, earning 28,000 album equivalent units in its first week.

This album mark as Wale's third and final release under the Atlantic Records label.

== Singles ==
The first single from the album, "My PYT", was released on May 20, 2016. The music video for the track premiered on July 25, 2016. The song has peaked at number 54 on the US Billboard Hot 100 chart.

"One Reason (Flex)" featuring American singer Eric Bellinger, was released as a promotional single on September 9, 2016.

"Groundhog Day" was released as the second promotional single on December 13, 2016. The music video for the song premiered on February 2, 2017.

"Running Back" featuring American rapper Lil Wayne, was released as the second single on January 20, 2017. The song's music video premiered on February 6, 2017. It has peaked at number 100 on the Billboard Hot 100.

The third single from the album, "Fashion Week" featuring American rapper G-Eazy, was released on February 24, 2017. The music video for the track premiered on April 10, 2017.

The album's fourth single, "Fish N Grits", was released on April 6, 2017, and features American rapper Travis Scott.

== Critical reception ==
Professional ratings
Aggregate scores
Source	Rating
Metacritic	65/100
Review scores
Source	Rating
AllMusic	3/5 stars
Exclaim!	8/10
HotNewHipHop	65%
No Ripcord	5/10
Pitchfork	6.0/10
XXL	4/5

Shine was met with generally mixed reviews from music critics. At Metacritic, which assigns a normalized rating out of 100 to reviews from professional publications, the album received an average score of 65, based on five reviews.

XXL writer Preezy said, "For the occasional missteps ("Mathematics," "Fish n Grits"), there are multiple bright spots throughout that make SHINE required listening and a solid addition to his discography. Five albums in, Wale remains one of the more mercurial talents in rap, with SHINE serving as further evidence of his abilities as an MC and a reminder of his lyrical radiance." AllMusic's Andy Kellman felt the album was "maximized for streaming with numerous cross-cultural stylistic switch-ups and a lengthy register of producers and guest artists" but highlighted "CC White" and "Smile" for showing Wale's lyrical talents, concluding that: "It should be enough to retain the listeners who strongly prefer the more lyrical, less hedonistic aspects of the Wale discography." Perry Simpson of HotNewHipHop called the record "Wale's weakest effort yet", highlighting the lack of his "trademark flair for poetry" and delving into "deeper messages and themes," and succumbing to "generic pop rap balladry and trap fusion" throughout the tracklist, concluding that: "This stark change in artistic direction is surprising. The overt and aggressive pandering to the lowest common denominator with these sounds here is frustrating. Wale can do better than SHiNE." Pitchfork contributor Jonah Bromwich critiqued that it was "a more buoyant album" than the "back-to-basics" on 2015's The Album About Nothing, noting the "varied set of production styles" and Wale's "usual acrobatic routine through hoops positioned by marketers and focus groups", but felt that Wale was putting more focus on "success, wealth, and the haters who are blocking his path to success and wealth", concluding that: "Listening to Shine, you can't help but think that Wale has finally dropped his rigorous standards for himself. He hadn't met them in several years, but before this, he was still trying." Michael G. Barilleaux, writing for No Ripcord, criticized the album for Wale's "very weak turnout" of lyrics and "a lack of uniqueness in the overall concepts and sonics" throughout the tracklist, saying "This project is not particularly awful, nor is it impressive. It is simply bland and tiresome to listen to."

== Commercial performance ==
Shine debuted at number 16 on the US Billboard 200 chart, earning 28,000 album equivalent units in its first week.

== Track listing ==
Shine track listing
No.	Title	Writer(s)	Producer(s)	Length
1.	"Thank God"	Olubowale Akintimehin; Marcello Valenzano; Andre Lyons; Rayshon Cobbs; Bryan Sledge; Larry Mizell	Cool & Dre; 808-Ray	3:10
2.	"Running Back" (featuring Lil Wayne)	Akintimehin; Dwayne Carter Jr.; Gary Hill; Daniel Forrest	Spinz Beats, Inc.	3:35
3.	"Scarface Rozay Gotti"	Akintimehin; Kevin Price; Jan Branicki	Go Grizzly; Dreamlife	5:02
4.	"My Love" (featuring Major Lazer, Wizkid and Dua Lipa)	Akintimehin; Thomas Pentz; Clément Picard; Maxime Picard; Ayodeji Balogun; Eric Bellinger	Diplo; The Picard Brothers; Kuk Harrell^{[b]}; Simone Torres^{[b]}	3:48
5.	"Fashion Week" (featuring G-Eazy)	Akintimehin; Ray Jacobs; Raymond Brady; Gerald Gillum; Taiwo Hassan; Kehinde Hassan; Kenna Zemedkun; Chad Hugo	Christian Rich	3:57
6.	"Colombia Heights (Te Llamo)" (featuring J Balvin)	Akintimehin; José Balvin; Donald Cannon; Jason Boyd	Don Cannon	3:47
7.	"CC White"	Akintimehin; Cedric Brown; Big Ghost Ltd.; Gerald David; Menard Maxwell; Hod David	CED; Big Ghost Ltd.^{[a]}; DJ Money^{[b]}	4:14
8.	"Mathematics"	Akintimehin; Daniel Johnson; Vinay Vyas; Abdoulaye Diop	Kane Beatz; Vinay; Majestic Drama	4:02
9.	"Fish N Grits" (featuring Travis Scott)	Akintimehin; Jacques Webster; Nesbitt Wesonga, Jr.; Mario Loving	Nez & Rio	2:57
10.	"Fine Girl" (featuring Davido and Olamide)	Akintimehin; David Adeleke; Olamide Adedeji; Marcè Ayala; Zachary Young; James Harris; Terry Lewis	Marcè Reazon	4:35
11.	"Heaven on Earth" (featuring Chris Brown)	Akintimehin; Christopher Brown; Miles Franklin; Philip Adetumbi; Yunalis Zara'ai; Christopher Braide	Super Miles	3:47
12.	"My PYT"	Akintimehin; Sam Sneak; Andrew Sanon; Jamel Nelson; James Ingram; Quincy Jones; Marvin Gaye; Odell Brown; David Ritz	The Dope Boyz	3:56
13.	"DNA"	Akintimehin; Leigh Elliott; Johnny Mollings; Lenny Mollings; Sean Momberger; Donald DeGrate	Lee Major; Momberger	3:44
14.	"Smile" (featuring Phil Adé and Zyla Moon)	Akintimehin; Adetumbi; Zyla Oluwakemi; Reese Cummings; Maurice Barnett-Fenderson; Arthur Ross; Leon Ware	Pro Reese	4:46
Total length:				58:58

Notes

- ^{^[a]} signifies a co-producer
- ^{^[b]} signifies an additional producer
- "Thank God" features additional vocals from singer Rotimi
- "Scarface Rozay Gotti" features background vocals from August Grant, and additional vocals from K-Doe Sleeze
- "My Love" features background vocals from Eric Bellinger
- "Fashion Week" features background vocals from August Grant, DJ Money, Edgar Machuca, Michika Skyy and Phil Adé
- "Colombia Heights (Te Llamo)" features additional vocals from Edgar Machuca
- "CC White" and "Heaven on Earth" features background vocals from Phil Adé
- "Fine Girl" features additional vocals from DJ Money
- "My PYT" features vocals from Sam Sneak

Sample credits

- "Thank God" contains a sample of "Wind Parade", written by Larry Mizell, as performed by Donald Byrd.
- "Fashion Week" contains a sample of "Kharma Is Coming", written by Kenna Zemedkun and Chad Hugo, as performed by Kenna.
- "CC White" contains a sample of "'Til the Cops Come Knockin'", written by Menard Maxwell and Hod David, as performed by Maxwell.
- "Fine Girl" contains a sample of "Can You Stand the Rain", written by James Harris and Terry Lewis, as performed by New Edition.
- "Heaven on Earth" contains a sample of "Lullabies", written by Yunalis Zara'ai and Christopher Braide, as performed by Yuna.
- "My PYT" contains an interpolation of "P.Y.T. (Pretty Young Thing)", written by James Ingram and Quincy Jones, as performed by Michael Jackson and a sample of "Sexual Healing", written by Marvin Gaye, Odell Brown and David Ritz, as performed by Marvin Gaye.
- "Smile" contains a sample of "I Wanna Be Where You Are", written by Arthur Ross and Leon Ware, as performed by Michael Jackson.

== Personnel ==
Vocalists

- Wale – primary artist
- Lil Wayne – featured artist (track 2)
- Major Lazer – featured artist (track 4)
- Wizkid – featured artist (track 4)
- Dua Lipa – featured artist (track 4)
- G-Eazy – featured artist (track 5)
- J Balvin – featured artist (track 6)
- Travis Scott – featured artist (track 9)
- Davido – featured artist (track 10)
- Olamide – featured artist (track 10)
- Chris Brown – featured artist (track 11)
- Phil Adé – featured artist (track 14), background artist (tracks 5, 7, 11)
- Zyla Moon – featured artist (track 14)
- Rotimi – background artist (track 1)
- August Grant – background artist (tracks 3, 5)
- K-Doe Sleeze – background artist (track 3)
- Eric Bellinger – background artist (track 4)
- DJ Money – background artist (tracks 5, 10)
- Edgar Machuca – background artist (track 5, 6)
- Michika Skyy – background artist (track 5)
- Sam Sneak – background artist (track 12)

Musicians

- Jeff Gitty – bass (track 7), guitar (track 7)
- Crissy J – violin (track 7)
- Cleva Keys – keyboard (track 7)
- Daniel Groover – guitar (track 13)

Technical

- Kevin Spencer – mixing engineer (all tracks), recording engineer (track 12)
- David Kutch – mastering engineer (tracks 1–11, 13, 14)
- Blake Harden – mixing engineer (track 9)
- Chris Athens – mastering engineer (track 12)
- Chad "KM" Kitchens – mixing engineer (track 14), recording engineer (track 14)

Production

- Cool & Dre – producer (track 1)
- 808-Ray – producer (track 1)
- Spinz Beats, Inc. – producer (track 2)
- Go Grizzly – producer (track 3)
- Dreamlife – producer (track 3)
- Diplo – producer (track 4)
- The Picard Brothers – producer (track 4)
- Kuk Harrell – additional producer (track 4)
- Simone Torres – additional producer (track 4)
- Christian Rich – producer (track 5)
- Don Cannon – producer (track 6)
- CED – producer (track 7)
- Big Ghost Ltd. – co-producer (track 7)
- DJ Money – additional producer (track 7)
- Kane Beatz – producer (track 8)
- Vinay – producer (track 8)
- Majestic Drama – producer (track 8)
- Nez & Rio – producer (track 9)
- Marcè Reazon – producer (track 10)
- Super Miles – producer (track 11)
- The Dope Boyz – producer (track 12)
- Lee Major – producer (track 13)
- Sean Momberger – producer (track 13)
- Pro Reese – producer (track 14)

== Charts ==
Weekly chart performance for Shine
Chart (2017)	Peak position
Dutch Albums (Album Top 100)	74
Norwegian Albums (VG-lista)	9
US Billboard 200	16
US Top R&B/Hip-Hop Albums (Billboard)	8
