= Fan of a Fan: The Album =

- Standard cover. Deluxe cover features golden background and letters.

Studio album by Chris Brown and Tyga
- Released: February 20, 2015
- Recorded: 2012–15
- Studio: Allure (Hollywood, California); Record Plant (Los Angeles, California); Ameraycan Studios (Los Angeles, California)
- Genre: West Coast hip-hop; R&B
- Length: 48:24
- Label: CBE; RCA; Last Kings; Young Money; Cash Money; Republic
- Producer: DJ Mustard; Jess Jackson; Nic Nac; Mel & Mus; P-Lo; Drumma Boy; Scott Storch; DJ Frank E; The MeKanics; David D.A. Doman; The Breed; Mark Kragen; Vinylz; Boi-1da; Mike Free

Chris Brown and Tyga chronology
Fan of a Fan (2010)	Fan of a Fan: The Album (2015)

Chris Brown chronology
X (2014)	Fan of a Fan: The Album (2015)	Royalty (2015)

Tyga chronology
Hotel California (2013)	Fan of a Fan: The Album (2015)	The Gold Album: 18th Dynasty (2015)

Singles from Fan of a Fan: The Album
- 1. "Ayo" Released: January 6, 2015; 2. "Bitches N Marijuana" Released: May 26, 2015

Fan of a Fan: The Album is a collaborative album by American singer Chris Brown and American rapper Tyga, billed together as Chris Brown X Tyga and was released on February 20, 2015, by RCA Records, along with affiliated record labels; including CBE Records, Last Kings Records, Young Money Entertainment, Cash Money Records and Republic Records. The album served as the sequel to their breakout mixtape Fan of a Fan (2010). A West Coast hip hop album infused with elements of R&B, Fan of a Fan: The Album focuses on gangsta rap themes. The album debuted at number seven on the US Billboard 200 and received mixed reviews from critics.

== Background and recording ==
In late 2012, Chris Brown revealed that he and Tyga had begun working on a sequel to their collaborative mixtape, Fan of a Fan (2010), titled Fan of a Fan 2. He then mentioned that the project had been postponed due to their respective solo albums. The artists continued recording songs for the project from 2013 until January 2015.

During a 2015 interview, Brown explained why they decided to create the album: "We already knew how to collaborate with each other. [We had] so much success from [Fan of a Fan the mixtape]. We wanted to reach our audiences abroad and be able to do it on a higher scale. As far as our music, individually we all have our own different variables and transitions on how we do stuff, but I think together, when we're collaborating, it's just so much fun."

== Music and lyrics ==
The lyrical themes of Fan of a Fan: The Album for the most part revolve around promiscuity, luxury, clubbing, and the duo's proficiency on the microphone. XXL commented that the album features "playful, sex-driven records, all while adding in a mix of slower rhythmic efforts." The album's songwriting features a wide usage of braggadocio. According to AllMusic, "much of the material is a reflection of the carefree (and early-'90s) look of the album's packaging". Musically, Fan of a Fan: The Album includes West Coast and DJ Mustard-styled productions, while the duo's performances alternate rapping from both of them, with Brown also showcasing melodic flows and R&B hooks in various tracks.

== Singles ==
"Ayo" was released as the lead single on January 6, 2015. The track was produced by American record producers Mark Kragen and Nic Nac, whom Chris Brown and Tyga previously worked with on "Loyal".

"Bitches N Marijuana", which features a guest verse from West Coast rapper Schoolboy Q, was released as a promotional single on February 6, 2015. It was later sent to rhythmic radio as the album's second single on May 26 of that same year.

== Critical reception ==
Professional ratings
Aggregate scores
Source	Rating
Metacritic	46/100
Review scores
Source	Rating
AllMusic	2.5/5 stars
DJBooth	4/5 stars
HipHopDX	3/5 stars
RapReviews	5/10
Rolling Stone	2/5 stars
XXL	L (3/5)

The album received mixed reviews from critics. XXL said that "Chris Brown and Tyga have given fans what they wanted, but with an abundance of turn-up tracks, the album fails to tackle more serious topics, as the duo has in the past on "Deuces." It's a wonder why they avoided the prior formula this go round." Writing for Rolling Stone, Nick Murray commented that "Fan of a Fan has its share of bangers". Gerrick D. Kennedy of the Los Angeles Times concluded that, "Overwrought with rap cliches, Fan of a Fan is a formulaic heaping of bouncy bangers primed for the strip clubs that likely inspired it. There isn't much here, besides expletive-filled musings on sex, drugs, cars and money". Marcus Dowling of HipHopDX argued that "Tyga, Chris Brown and an ensemble cast of turnt up and fiendish rap wildmen perform club anthems, top-40 staples and err away from bar-for-bar lyrical mayhem on this album."

== Commercial performance ==
Fan of a Fan: The Album debuted at number seven on the US Billboard 200, moving 66,000 album-equivalent units with 51,000 in pure album sales in the first week of release. In the second week the album fell at number 24, with 21,000 album-equivalent units and 12,000 in pure album sales. As of March 2015, the album has sold 72,000 copies and has been streamed 16 million times domestically. On October 1, 2021 the album was certified gold by the Recording Industry Association of America (RIAA).

In the United Kingdom, Fan of a Fan: The Album debuted at number seven on the UK Albums Chart and number one on the UK R&B Albums chart. The album was eventually certified Gold by the British Phonographic Industry (BPI) for sales of over 100,000 copies in the UK.

== Track listing ==
Fan of a Fan: The Album — Standard edition
No.	Title	Writer(s)	Producer(s)	Length
1.	"Westside"	Chris Brown; Michael Ray Nguyen-Stevenson	The Breed	3:34
2.	"Nothin' Like Me" (featuring Ty Dolla $ign)	Brown; Stevenson; Tyrone Griffin Jr.; Samuel Jean	DJ Mustard; Mike Free	4:05
3.	"Ayo"	Brown; Stevenson	Nic Nac; Kragen^{[a]}	3:45
4.	"Girl You Loud"	Brown; Stevenson	Drumma Boy	3:33
5.	"Remember Me"	Brown; Stevenson	Jackson; Vinylz; Boi-1da	4:13
6.	"I Bet" (featuring 50 Cent)	Brown; Stevenson; Curtis Jackson III	P-Lo	4:02
7.	"D.G.I.F.U." (featuring Pusha T)	Brown; Stevenson; Jackson; Terrence Thornton; Melvin Bradford	David D.A. Doman; Jackson^{[a]}	3:44
8.	"Better"	Brown; Stevenson; Arnold Hennings; Debra Killings	Jackson	3:42
9.	"Lights Out" (featuring Fat Trel)	Brown; Stevenson; Estefany Perez; Martrel Reeves	Jackson	4:46
10.	"Real One" (featuring Boosie Badazz)	Brown; Stevenson; James Stewart; Torrence Hatch	Doman	4:59
11.	"Bitches N Marijuana" (featuring Schoolboy Q)	Brown; Stevenson; Paris Jones; Quincy Hanley	Nic Nac	4:14
12.	"She Goin' Up"	Brown; Stevenson	DJ Frank E; Andrew Cedar^{[a]}	3:47

Fan of a Fan: The Album — Deluxe edition (bonus tracks)
No.	Title	Writer(s)	Producer(s)	Length
13.	"Wrong In the Right Way"	Brown; Stevenson; Rico Evans	Scott Storch; The Mekanics	4:30
14.	"Bunkin'" (featuring Jay 305 and T.I.)	Brown; Stevenson; Stewart; Jay Cummings; Clifford Harris Jr.	Doman	5:02
15.	"It's Yo Shit" (featuring Wale)	Brown; Stevenson; Olubowale Akintimehin	Mel & Mus	3:47
16.	"Banjo"	Brown; Stevenson	DJ Mustard	3:39

Notes

- ^{^[a]} signifies a co-producer.

Sample credits

- "D.G.I.F.U" samples "Forgot About Dre" by Dr. Dre and "Notorious Thugs" by The Notorious B.I.G.
- "Better" samples "Take Our Time" by TLC

== Charts ==
=== Weekly charts ===
Weekly chart performance for Fan of a Fan: The Album
Chart (2015)	Peak position
Australian Albums (ARIA)	3
Australian Urban Albums (ARIA)	1
Austrian Albums (Ö3 Austria)	16
Belgian Albums (Ultratop Flanders)	51
Belgian Albums (Ultratop Wallonia)	60
Canadian Albums (Billboard)	11
Danish Albums (Hitlisten)	12
Dutch Albums (Album Top 100)	30
French Albums (SNEP)	33
German Albums (Offizielle Top 100)	14
New Zealand Albums (RMNZ)	9
Norwegian Albums (VG-lista)	26
Irish Albums (IRMA)	31
Italian Albums (FIMI)	65
Scottish Albums (Official Charts)	17
South Korean Albums (Circle)	97
Spanish Albums (Promusicae)	62
Swedish Albums (Sverigetopplistan)	28
Swiss Albums (Schweizer Hitparade)	6
UK Albums (Official Charts)	7
UK R&B Albums (Official Charts)	1
US Billboard 200	7
US Top R&B/Hip-Hop Albums (Billboard)	3

=== Year-end charts ===
2015 year-end chart performance for Fan of a Fan: The Album
Chart (2015)	Position
Australian Urban Albums (ARIA)	10
Danish Albums (Hitlisten)	51
US Billboard 200	144
US Top R&B/Hip-Hop Albums (Billboard)	37

2016 year-end chart performance for Fan of a Fan: The Album
Chart (2016)	Position
Australian Urban Albums (ARIA)	99

== Certifications ==
Certifications for Fan of a Fan: The Album
Region	Certification	Certified units/sales
Australia (ARIA)	Gold	35,000^{‡}
Denmark (IFPI Danmark)	Platinum	20,000^{‡}
New Zealand (RMNZ)	Platinum	15,000^{‡}
United Kingdom (BPI)	Gold	100,000^{‡}
United States (RIAA)	Gold	500,000^{‡}
^{‡} Sales+streaming figures based on certification alone.

== Release history ==
Release dates and formats for Fan of a Fan: The Album
Country	Date	Label	Format
Germany	February 20, 2015	RCA Records	CD; digital download
United Kingdom	February 23, 2015	RCA Records	CD; digital download
Canada	February 24, 2015	RCA Records	CD; digital download
United States	February 24, 2015	RCA Records	CD; digital download
