= Hot (Pia Mia song) =

2020 single by Pia Mia

- Original cover

Single by Pia Mia
- Released: July 24, 2020
- Recorded: 2020
- Genre: Pop; R&B
- Length: 2:35
- Label: Republic; Electric Feel Entertainment
- Songwriters: Pia Perez; Jessie Lauren Foutz; Denisia "Blu June" Andrews; Brittany Coney; Uzoechi Emenike; Samuel Homaee; Jonathan Wienner; Benjamin Diehl
- Producers: NOVA WAV; Ben Billions; The Roommates

Pia Mia singles chronology
"Princess" (2020)	"Hot" (2020)	"730" (2021)

"Hot" is a song by Guamanian singer Pia Mia. It was released on July 24, 2020, by Republic Records and Electric Feel Entertainment. A remix of the song featuring Sean Paul and Flo Milli was released on October 27, 2020.

== Background and composition ==
'Hot' is self-explanatory to me. It’s about having a spark with someone and being upfront about it. I like you, I want you, you better keep it real hot. I believe that women should be able to speak on whatever they think and feel — and express their sexuality without a second thought or worry about being judged.

— Pia Mia talking about the meaning of "Hot"

Pia Mia first revealed the title of the song in an interview with Idolator, revealing it would be the next single to be released from her upcoming album after "Princess". Pia Mia shared a snippet of the song on July 18, 2020, on her social media. She later revealed the cover art of the song three days before its release.

== Music video ==
In an interview with Wonderland Magazine, Pia revealed that a "visualiser" for the song was shot by a local team in Guam, whilst an official music video will later be shot in Los Angeles. On September 6, 2020, Pia Mia announced via her social medias that the visualiser for "Hot" will be released on September 9. The visualizer was released exclusively through Pia Mia's OnlyFans page on September 9, before being uploaded publicly on YouTube on September 14.

== Critical reception ==
Evan Real of Billboard praised the song stating that the song features, "shimmering vocals, seductive lyrics and an island-tinged beat that will send fans straight to the (socially-distanced) dance floor". Wonderland Magazine called the song "a sizzling, sun-soaked summer bop, with the mileage to follow suit of 'Do It Again'".

== Remix ==
"Hot" (Remix)

Single by Pia Mia and Flo Milli featuring Sean Paul
- Released: October 27, 2020
- Recorded: 2020
- Genre: Pop; R&B
- Length: 3:25
- Label: Republic; Electric Feel Entertainment
- Songwriters: Pia Perez; Sean Paul Henriques; Tamia Carter; Jessie Lauren Foutz; Denisia "Blu June" Andrews; Brittany Coney; Uzoechi Emenike; Samuel Homaee; Jonathan Wienner; Benjamin Diehl
- Producers: NOVA WAV; Ben Billions; The Roommates

Flo Milli singles chronology
"Plain" (2020)	"Hot" (Remix) (2020)	"I Am" (2020)

Sean Paul singles chronology
"Bad Inna Bed" (2020)	"Hot" (Remix) (2020)	"Guns of Navarone" (2020)

On October 25, Pia Mia announced the "Hot" remix on her social medias featuring Sean Paul and an unannounced artist. The unknown feature was later revealed to be American rapper Flo Milli and was announced alongside the release of the song on October 27, 2020.

=== Music video ===
A visualizer for the remix featuring Sean Paul and Flo Milli was released on October 30.
