= The Gift (EP) =

EP by Pia Mia
- Released: December 23, 2013
- Recorded: 2013
- Genre: Pop; hip hop; R&B
- Length: 25:28; 20:28 (iTunes version)
- Label: Wolfpack; Interscope
- Producer: Nic Nac

Pia Mia chronology
| The Gift (2013) | The Gift 2 (2017) |

Singles from The Gift
- 1. "Red Love" Released: December 9, 2013; 2. "Mr. President" Released: May 19, 2014

The Gift is the debut extended play (EP) by Guamanian singer Pia Mia. It was initially released independently on December 23, 2013, before being re-released on digital services on February 25, 2014, through Wolfpack and Interscope Records. Produced primarily by Nic Nac, The Gift is a pop and R&B record that is influenced by hip hop and trap music.

Mia first posted her cover of Canadian rapper Drake's song "Hold On, We're Going Home" to YouTube on August 23, 2013. She later posted the song "Shotgun Love", which appeared on the initial independent release of The Gift. "Red Love" and "Mr. President" were released as the only singles from The Gift in December 2013 and May 2014 respectively.

== Track listings ==
| No. | Title | Writer(s) | Length |
|---|---|---|---|
| 1. | "On My Mind" | Pia Mia Perez; Marc Griffin | 3:05 |
| 2. | "I Got It" | Perez; Griffin | 2:35 |
| 3. | "Complicated" | Perez; Griffin | 3:09 |
| 4. | "Lost & Found" | Jermiah "Sick Pen" Bethea; Perez | 4:18 |
| 5. | "Red Love" | Perez; Griffin | 3:25 |
| 6. | "Mr. President" | Perez; Griffin | 3:02 |
| 7. | "Hold On, We're Going Home" | Aubrey Graham; Noah Shebib; Majid Al Maskati; Jordan Ullman | 3:03 |
| 8. | "Shotgun Love" | Perez; Griffin | 2:51 |
| Total length: | | | 25:28 |

Digital services re-release
| No. | Title | Writer(s) | Length |
|---|---|---|---|
| 1. | "On My Mind" | Perez; Griffin | 3:04 |
| 2. | "Complicated" | Perez; Griffin | 3:40 |
| 3. | "Lost & Found" | Bethea | 4:17 |
| 4. | "Mr. President" | Perez; Griffin | 3:01 |
| 5. | "Hold On, We're Going Home" | Graham; Shebib; Maskati; Ullman | 3:01 |
| 6. | "Red Love" | Perez; Griffin | 3:25 |
| Total length: | | | 20:28 |
