= Summer on Sunset =

Mixtape by Wale
- Released: June 17, 2016
- Genre: Hip-hop
- Length: 60:21
- Labels: Every Blue Moon; Maybach Music
- Producers: Ari PenSmith; August Grant; B Ham; Bobby Keyz; Cairo Mayeson; Dave Knock; DJ Chose; DJ Money; DJ Mustard; Esta; Go Grizzly; Jake One; Kris Minor; Lee Major; Marcè Reazon; Mister Neek; Nez & Rio; Progressive; Pro Reese; Soufwest; Spinz Beats, Inc.; Squat AC Chann3l; Yak Beats
- Compiler: DJ Quicksilva

Wale chronology
The Album About Nothing (2015)	Summer on Sunset (2016)	Shine (2017)

Summer on Sunset is a mixtape by American rapper Wale. It was released on June 17, 2016, by Every Blue Moon and Maybach Music Group, on DatPiff for free. The mixtape features guest appearances from Raheem DeVaughn, Ty Dolla Sign, Tha Dogg Pound, Cam'ron, Phil Adé, Jazz Cartier, Victoria Monét, Jim Ross and Eric Bellinger. The production on the mixtape was handled by several producers, including DJ Mustard, Nez & Rio, Marcè Reazon, Lee Major, DJ Chose and Jake One, among others. Summer on Sunset was released as a prelude to his fifth studio album, Shine, which was released on April 28, 2017, nine months prior. Plus, the mixtape was also hosted by DMV native DJ Quicksilva.

The mixtape received great success on DatPiff, becoming one of the most listened to and downloaded free mixtapes of all time.

The mixtape was also released as a commercial mixtape, exclusively on streaming platforms (such as Apple Music, Tidal, Amazon Music and Spotify) in its entirety, excluding the song "Bitches Like You".

== Background and release ==
On June 8, 2016, he collaborated with his MMG labelmates Meek Mill and Rick Ross on a song titled, "Make It Work", which was a lead single for Maybach Music Group's upcoming fourth compilation album Self Made Vol. 4, which was slated for release the following year. On June 9, 2016, he released a solo song called "Her Wave", which was the follow-up to the lead single for his fifth album "My PYT", which was released a month prior. Next, he released another song called "Reminisce", featuring fellow DMV rapper Phil Adé. On June 15, 2016, Wale announced on Twitter that his fifth studio album Shine would be released soon and he also announced that his mixtape would be dropping on Friday. He released another solo song called "Back to the Sun", hours before the mixtape release. Wale finally released a 17-track mixtape, called Summer on Sunset, as a prelude to Shine.

== Critical reception ==
Professional ratings
Review scores
Source	Rating
Exclaim!	5/10
HipHopDX	3.4/5

Summer on Sunset was met with generally mixed reviews from music critics. Narsimha Chintaluri of HipHopDX, commented saying the song "It's Too Late" plays like a "Drake-like reference track to Quentin Miller", "Publishing Checks" stands as a "soulless Young Thug knockoff", while "Paparazzi" veers into Fetty Wap's "lane of strained crooning". Plus, he commented, "regardless, catchy melodies are sprinkled throughout, making it easier to shrug off the feeling of familiarity". Also, he praised "Gangsta Boogie", for being an undeniable highlight complete with a cook-out vibe and a classic bass-heavy-west-coast bounce over which legends Kurupt and Daz Dillinger impart insight and cautionary tales as a foil to Wale's fish-out-of-water perspective". Plus, the critic says that "Wale's music has always played off of the luxurious allure of Hollywood, so his move to L.A., which ties this tape together conceptually is fitting". He also commented that DJ Mustard made a "fleeting appearance" to set the tone early on, but standouts like "Gangsta Boogie" are ultimately produced by rising composers such as DJ Chose. He praised the songs "Day By the Pool" and "Valentino", because of his "interesting beat-switches". And finally, he praised the whole mixtape stating: "Summer on Sunset is a "carefully constructed promo" for Shine. It showcases Wale's adaption to a soundscape filled with Lil Uzi Vert's and Lil Yachty's, is loosely stitched together by a familiar tale of Tinseltown disillusionment, and could work as the rise before the inevitable fall".

XXL''s Scott Glaysher says that Summer on Sunset proves to be some of Wale's "most cohesive work". The critic says the song "LAX" manages to catch that "classic summer vibe" which includes some "laissez-faire rhymes", a "warm twang" and "an extra melodic assist" from Raheem DeVaughn. He added that the song is a "suitable opener" that gets a follow up by the next song "Publishing Checks", and he described it as an "unconventional brag fest". Next, the critic says, "these intros and outros are fascinating to hear if you're enjoying the tape from front to back but if you're just trying to hear summer slappers like "It's Too Late" and "Thought It" on their own, well, then listeners might be tempted to press that skip button", and he adds, "however, the production will keep ears coming back for more and more". Plus, the critic made a praising comment stating that all the instrumentation is "incredibly on point with not a single beat feeling out of place or lackluster". Next, the critic commented that the song "Day by the Pool" and "Ms. Moon" has lots of "hookup hymns and flirty bars", but his most explicitly descriptive lines surface on Summer on Sunset's closer is, "Women of Los Angeles".

A. Harmony from Exclaim! made a comment stating that the project manages to be "aggressively mediocre from beginning to end". He adds that the beats on the project are "not hearty" enough to resonate, the lyrics are "mundane and repetitive", and the hooks "lack appetizing bait". Plus, he says that Summer on Sunset still has its "bright moments". The critic says that the song "It's Too Late", is one of the few songs on which Wale's singing actually "seems to fit". And, the critic also praised the song "Valentino", describing it as a "smooth, buoyant backdrop to a hot and naughty summer's night".

== Commercial performance ==
On DatPiff, Summer on Sunset received great success, being one of the most listened to and downloaded free mixtapes on the platform. The mixtape was certified platinum by the site's standards, reaching over 200,000 downloads and over 1,000,000 full listens.

== Track listing ==
No.	Title	Producer(s)	Length
1.	"LAX (featuring a skit at minute 3:41)" (featuring Raheem DeVaughn)	Mister Neek; DJ Money	4:22
2.	"Publishing Checks"	Kris Minor	2:47
3.	"It's Too Late (featuring a skit a minute 3:30)"	Go Grizzly; Yak Beats^{[a]}; Bobby Keyz^{[a]}	4:03
4.	"Thought It" (featuring Ty Dolla Sign and Jim Moses)	DJ Mustard	3:00
5.	"Gangsta Boogie" (featuring Tha Dogg Pound)	DJ Chose	4:36
6.	"Paparazzi (featuring a skit at minute 3:03)"	Progressive	3:27
7.	"Day By the Pool"	Squat AC Chann3l; Soufwest	4:51
8.	"Drunk & Conceited (featuring a skit at minute 3:52)"	Marcè Reazon; Cairo Mayeson	4:28
9.	"Bitches Like You" (featuring Cam'ron)	Spinz Beats, Inc.	4:14
10.	"Valentino"	Nez & Rio	4:13
11.	"Breakin' Necks (Interlude) (featuring a skit at minute 1:47)"	Jake One	2:53
12.	"Still Up" (featuring Phil Adé and Jazz Cartier)	Lee Major; Ari PenSmith^{[b]}	3:51
13.	"Pyramids"	Esta	2:18
14.	"Ms. Moon (featuring a skit at minute 3:35)"	Pro Reese	3:59
15.	"Losing (featuring a skit at minute 3:15)" (featuring Victoria Monét)	Marcè Reazon	4:01
16.	"Smackdown / Raw (featuring a skit at minute 1:55)" (featuring Jim Ross)	Dave Knock	2:51
17.	"Women of Los Angeles (featuring a skit at minute 3:26)" (featuring Eric Bellinger)	B Ham; August Grant	3:47
Total length:			60:21

Streaming version
No.	Title	Length
1.	"LAX" (featuring Raheem DeVaughn)	4:16
2.	"Publishing Checks"	2:46
3.	"It's Too Late"	3:34
4.	"Thought It" (featuring Ty Dolla Sign and Joe Moses)	2:59
5.	"Gangsta Boogie" (featuring Tha Dogg Pound)	4:36
6.	"Paparazzi"	3:04
7.	"Day By the Pool"	4:49
8.	"Drunk & Conceited"	3:30
9.	"Valentino"	4:11
10.	"Breakin' Necks (Interlude)"	1:47
11.	"Still Up" (featuring Phil Adé and Jazz Cartier)	3:51
12.	"Pyramids"	2:16
13.	"Ms. Moon"	3:38
14.	"Losing" (featuring Victoria Monét)	3:19
15.	"Smackdown / Raw" (featuring Jim Ross)	1:45
16.	"Women of Los Angeles" (featuring Eric Bellinger)	3:35
Total length:		54:04

=== Notes ===
- ^{^[a]} signifies a co-producer
- ^{^[b]} signifies an uncredited co-producer

=== Sample credits ===
- "LAX" contains elements from "The Boss", written by James Brown, Charles Bobbit and Fred Wesley, and performed by James Brown.
- "It's Too Late" contains elements from "Long Red", written by Leslie West, Felix Pappalardi, John Venturaand Norman Landsberg, and performed by Leslie West.
- "Thought It" contains elements from "Uptown Anthem", written by Vincent Brown, Anthony Criss and Keir Lamont Gist, and performed by Naughty by Nature.
- "Gangsta Boogie" contains an interpolation of "Gangster Boogie", performed by Chicago Gangsters.
- "Drunk & Conceited" contains samples from "Special Kinda Fool", written by Dino Conner and Shazam Conner, and performed by H-Town.
- "Bitches Like You" contains samples from "You Sure Love to Ball", written and performed by Marvin Gaye.
- "Losing" contains samples from "Losing", written and performed by Rochelle Jordan.
- "Women of Los Angeles" contains samples from "We Gonna Take U Back (Lude) / Don't Leave Me", written by Teddy Riley, Chauncey Black, Roosevelt "Bink" Harrell, Karen Anderson and Bunny DeBarge, performed by Blackstreet.
