= Boys & Girls (will.i.am song) =

Single by will.i.am featuring Pia Mia
- Released: April 8, 2016
- Length: 4:01
- Label: Interscope
- Songwriters: William Adams; Charlotte Aitchison; Jef Martens; Kylie Minogue; Fernando Garibay
- Producers: will.i.am; Lazy J; Dustin Highbridge; Wojtek Stypko

will.i.am singles chronology
"I'm So Excited" (2014)	"Boys & Girls" (2016)	"FIYAH" (2017)

Pia Mia singles chronology
"Touch" (2015)	"Boys & Girls" (2016)	"I'm a Fan" (2017)

"Boys & Girls" is a song by American rapper will.i.am featuring Guamanian singer Pia Mia. It was released on April 8, 2016, by Interscope Records. The song samples "Break This Heartbreak" by Kylie and Garibay.

The song was originally recorded by singer Charli XCX for her scrapped third studio album, titled by fans as XCX World.

== Music video ==
On April 7, 2016, will.i.am uploaded the music video for "Boys & Girls" on his YouTube and Vevo account. The video was directed by Spencer Creigh.

== Track listing ==
- Digital download
1. "Boys & Girls" (featuring Pia Mia) — 4:01

== Charts ==
Chart (2016)	Peak position
Australia (ARIA)	53
Belgium (Ultratop 50 Flanders)	49
Belgium Urban (Ultratop Flanders)	11
Belgium (Ultratip Bubbling Under Wallonia)	17
CIS Airplay (TopHit)	191
Euro Digital Song Sales (Billboard)	20
France (SNEP)	46
Germany (GfK)	39
Ireland (IRMA)	42
Scottish Singles Sales (Official Charts)	14
Slovakia Airplay (ČNS IFPI)	78
UK Singles (Official Charts)	21
UK Hip Hop/R&B (Official Charts)	6

== Certifications ==
Region	Certification	Certified units/sales
United Kingdom (BPI)	Silver	200,000^{‡}
^{‡} Sales+streaming figures based on certification alone.

== Live performances ==
Will.i.am performed the song on the series 5 finale of The Voice UK on April 9, 2016.
