= Ayo (song) =

Song by Chris Brown featuring Tyga

Single by Chris Brown and Tyga

from the album Fan of a Fan: The Album
- Released: January 6, 2015
- Recorded: 2014
- Genre: West Coast hip-hop; R&B; pop rap
- Length: 3:49
- Label: RCA; Young Money; Cash Money; Republic
- Songwriters: Chris Brown; Michael Stevenson
- Producers: Nic Nac; Kragen

Chris Brown singles chronology
"Waves" (Robin Schulz remix) (2014)	"Ayo" (2015)	"Hotel" (2015)

Tyga singles chronology
"Collide" (2014)	"Ayo" (2015)	"Bitches N Marijuana" (2015)

Music video
- "Ayo" on YouTube

"Ayo" is a song by American singer Chris Brown and American rapper Tyga (billed together as Chris Brown X Tyga), released on January 6, 2015 as the lead single from their collaboration album, Fan of a Fan: The Album (2015). It was produced by West Coast hip-hop producers Nic Nac and Mark Kragen, the former of whom Brown previously worked with on his 2014 single "Loyal".

An accompanying music video was directed by Colin Tilley and filmed in Los Angeles, California. The video features various scenes of Brown and Tyga competing with one another to show off their riches and ends with them drag racing Lamborghinis. It also features cameo appearances by comedian Mike Epps and the dance duo Les Twins. The song was included on the set list of Brown's 2015 Between the Sheets Tour with Trey Songz.

== Background ==
"Ayo" was written by Chris Brown and Tyga (real name Michael Stevenson) and the track's producers are Nic Nac (real name Nicholas Balding) and Mark Kragen. On November 14, 2014 Tyga announced via Twitter that the lead single from his and Brown's Fan of a Fan: The Album would be released in one week. The single was expected to be "Nothin Like Me" featuring Ty Dolla $ign and produced by DJ Mustard, but the album was delayed and the decision was made to release "Ayo" as the lead single instead. During an interview with Power 106 on December 5, 2014 Brown announced a January release for the song and expressed his excitement, stating, “We already got it locked and loaded. Nic Nac produced it; it's crazy. It's one of them ones. We just gonna have fun, man.” An early preview of “Ayo” was released on SoundCloud on December 17, 2014 after Brown tweeted, “Who is ready for this CHRIS BROWN/TYGA ALBUM??? Got a surprise for the fans coming!”. Three weeks later, the song officially premiered on iTunes on January 6, 2015.

== Composition ==
"Ayo" is a "synth-laced", pop soundtrack delivered over an uptempo beat, further described as a "club banger" and a "light-hearted party anthem". The bassline is reminiscent of Brown's previous hit "Loyal" (2014) which was also produced by Nic Nac. David Drake of Complex described the song's production as "replete with an echoing 'I neeeed you' helium vocal" and compared its musical vibe to the original version of Nicki Minaj's “Truffle Butter” (2014), while contributors at The Singles Jukebox noted its "rave-like sample gasps" and techniques seemingly borrowed from "British pop-house beat constructionists".On "Ayo", Chris Brown sings the hook and second verse, Tyga raps the first verse, and both artists rap on the final verse.

The song opens with a hook sung by Brown followed by Tyga rapping the lines, "Aye babe, this my new s— / I'm the black Richie Rich with the roof missing / If it don't make dollars, don't make sense / Z, wake up like I gotta get it." As the track progresses and the two trade verses, Tyga's rhymes cover the subjects of "money, cars, and his many sexual escapades" while Brown's melodies discuss "his flashy lifestyle and his brief stint in rehab". Concerning the overall mood of the song, Daryl Nelson from The Boombox wrote that it has a "true summertime feel" and "evokes thoughts of warm sunshine, blue skies and good times."

== Critical reception ==
Justin Davis of Complex noted between Brown and Tyga an "uncanny chemistry" and wrote, "Chris provides the fun-loving and catchy chorus while Tyga handles the song lyrically...the two heartthrobs seemingly haven't missed a step." Adam Fleisher from MTV News noted, "the track is so catchy it's hard not to just run it back." Ali Szubiak of PopCrush also found the hook "insanely catchy", but described the song's sexually charged lyrics as "like Tinder in song form." DJBooth's David Spadine and staff writers at Power 106 both noted the song's similarities to Brown's 2014 single "Loyal" with Spadine concluding, "On the set's latest single, AYO, the twosome mine the same rich vein of pop appeal that they did on Loyal, another Nic Nac production." Similarly, Elias Leight of Billboard wrote, "The song works around many of the same motifs as Chris Brown's "Loyal," a smash in 2014." FDRMX reviewer CedricCed wrote, "Chris Brown achieves as usual, vocally giving off his cocky, showy persona, which benefits this track in a huge way. Tyga also manages to stand out on the record, bringing cohesive ingredients of a smash hit. Chris Brown performs an excellent vocal, but Tyga steals the show with a surprisingly substantial verse."

== Music video ==
=== Background ===
The accompanying music video for "Ayo" was directed by Colin Tilley and filmed in January 2015 in Los Angeles, California. The official video was released on February 3, 2015, and additional images from the shoot were released on Instagram the same day. In the month prior to its release Brown teased the video by posting a photo on his Instagram account of one of the scenes showing himself and Tyga standing on a rooftop in fur coats. A lyric video was also posted on Brown's Vevo account on January 22, 2015 displaying the words to the song overlaid atop a background of animated visual interpretations of the lyrics. Behind-the-scenes footage published on March 5, 2015 showed clips from the making of the music video narrated by the executive producer Andrew Listermann and assistant director Jamar Hawkins.

=== Synopsis ===
The music video features Tyga and Chris Brown trying to upstage one another by showing off their luxury goods. In the opening shot Brown takes a selfie in front of a swimming pool as a team of construction workers use a backhoe to dump money into it. The scene features Naressa Valdez. He is later shown floating on a gold-cushioned mattress in the money-filled water throughout the video. Brown posts the selfie video on a new social media app called PingTank and Tyga responds by posting a PingTank video of a gold toilet being installed in his mansion with gold bars dropping on top of it. Afterwards, he and Brown continue to go back and forth flaunting their wealthy lifestyles in a montage of scenes that includes a live tiger, the two of them playing chess with female models fencing in the background, and beautiful women playing polo on horses. Their outfits and a recurring shot of the pair rapping inside a wind tunnel pay homage to Diddy's and Mase's 1997 classic "Mo Money Mo Problems" video. The wind tunnel shot also includes a cameo by the dance duo Les Twins. Next, the scene changes to a parking lot where Tyga and Brown rap and sing in front of rows of luxury cars with motorcycles circling around them. Finally, they meet up and race custom Lamborghinis past a police officer in a parked patrol car played by comedian Mike Epps. Epps jokingly refers to Tyga as "Tigger" and quips that Brown is supposed to be doing community service while chasing the two across a bridge. The video ends with Epps and his passengers exiting the patrol car, presumably in an attempt to apprehend Brown and Tyga.

=== Reception ===
Dominique Zonyee of The Boombox compared its "colorful visuals" to "a six-minute long short film", and noted "The R&B superstar and the West Coast MC take a page from Diddy's book in the 90's-inspired video with bucket hats and huge gold chains to match." Hip-Hop Wired's Chris Thomas wrote that the shoot was "a dazzling visual" with "a classic 'anything you can do, I can do better' scenario between Brown and Tyga." Critics generally characterized the video's plot as both "fun and flashy" and "obnoxiously opulent". Adam Fleischer from MTV News wrote, "between CB dumping a truckload of money into a pool and T-Raww showing off his gold toilet, this plays like a ridiculous episode of MTV Cribs." Similarly, Stereogum music reviewer Tom Breihan called the storyline "sumptuous ridiculousness". "But," he added, "that won't stop me from enjoying the funhouse-mirror version of a balling-out 1998 rap video." Paul Thompson of XXL Magazine concluded, "Basically everything that Brown and Tyga's joint album, Fan Of a Fan, promises to be—larger than life, confusing, flossy, Technicolor—is realized in this six-minute clip."

== Live performances ==
The song was first performed on The Tonight Show Starring Jimmy Fallon on February 16, 2015 with accompaniment by the show's house band, The Roots. The song was also included on the set list of the duo's 2015 Between the Sheets Tour with Trey Songz.

== Remixes ==
A remix of the song by American producer Jason Nevins was released for digital download on February 18, 2015.

== Track listings ==
- Digital download
1. "Ayo" – 3:45
- Digital download
1. "Ayo" (Jason Nevins Remix) – 4:15

== Charts ==
=== Weekly charts ===
Weekly chart performance for "Ayo"
Chart (2015-16)	Peak position
Australia (ARIA)	32
Austria (Ö3 Austria Top 40)	58
Belgium (Ultratip Bubbling Under Flanders)	12
Belgium Urban (Ultratop Flanders)	14
Belgium (Ultratip Bubbling Under Wallonia)	2
Canada Hot 100 (Billboard)	61
Denmark (Tracklisten)	16
France (SNEP)	32
Germany (GfK)	23
Hungary (Stream Top 40)	40
Ireland (IRMA)	27
Italy (FIMI)	88
Netherlands (Single Top 100)	45
New Zealand (Recorded Music NZ)	31
Sweden (Sverigetopplistan)	59
Switzerland (Schweizer Hitparade)	43
UK Singles (Official Charts)	6
UK Hip Hop/R&B (Official Charts)	1
US Billboard Hot 100	21
US Hot R&B/Hip-Hop Songs (Billboard)	7
US R&B/Hip-Hop Airplay (Billboard)	3
US Dance Airplay (Billboard)	38
US Pop Airplay (Billboard)	26
US Rhythmic Airplay (Billboard)	2

=== Year-end charts ===
2015 year-end chart performance for "Ayo"
Chart (2015)	Position
Australia Urban (ARIA)	23
France (SNEP)	73
Germany (Official German Charts)	73
UK Singles (OCC)	38
US Billboard Hot 100	86
US Rhythmic (Billboard)	12

== Certifications ==
Certifications for "Ayo"
Region	Certification	Certified units/sales
Australia (ARIA)	2× Platinum	140,000^{‡}
Denmark (IFPI Danmark)	Platinum	60,000^{^}
Germany (BVMI)	Platinum	400,000^{‡}
Italy (FIMI)	Gold	25,000^{‡}
New Zealand (RMNZ)	3× Platinum	90,000^{‡}
United Kingdom (BPI)	2× Platinum	1,200,000^{‡}
United States (RIAA)	3× Platinum	3,000,000^{‡}
^{^} Shipments figures based on certification alone.^{‡} Sales+streaming figures based on certification alone.
