= PJ (singer) =

American singer and songwriter from North Carolina

- Born: Paris Alexandria Jones; March 14, 1992 (age 34)
- Origin: Greensboro, North Carolina, U.S.
- Genres: Pop; alternative R&B
- Occupations: Singer; songwriter
- Years active: 2012–present
- Labels: Atlantic; APG
- Website: justpeej.com

Paris Alexandria Jones, known professionally as PJ, is an American singer and songwriter from Greensboro, North Carolina. PJ began her career as a songwriter, signed to Artist Publishing Group, and has written for Wiz Khalifa, Usher, Chris Brown, Charlie Puth and Fantasia Barrino. She categorizes her sound as "Come Up Music", and doesn't hold herself to one specific genre.

PJ released her Atlantic Records five-song debut EP, Walking Around Pools, in March 2015. On July 15, 2016, she released her debut album, Rare, which has features from G-Eazy and Ty Dolla Sign. in 2019 she released her debut single "One Missed Call".

== Tours ==
PJ took Rare on the road, opening for K.Michelle in support of her third album, More Issues Than Vogue.

Supporting:

- Hello Kimberly Tour

== Discography ==
=== Walking Around Pools EP ===
PJ's debut EP was released on March 10, 2015. Music videos for "I Mean It" were released in support of the EP.

No.	Title	Length
1.	"I Mean It" (featuring Hit-Boy)	4:33
2.	"Own" (featuring Gizzle)	3:51
3.	"Nickels & Dimes"	5:22
4.	"These Lines"	4:41
5.	"Make Believe"	4:00
Total length:		22:27

=== Rare ===
PJ's debut, full-length LP was released on July 15, 2016. "Gangster" was chosen as the first single from the album, and the video was released in April 2016. Videos for "Tell Me" (featuring Jevon Doe), and "This Is What It Looks Like" were also released.

No.	Title	Writer(s)	Producer(s)	Length
1.	"Something Special"	Paris Alexandria Jones		4:46
2.	"Gangster" (featuring Ty Dolla Sign)	Jones		3:56
3.	"Can't Stop"	Jones		3:11
4.	"I'm Good"	Jones		4:04
5.	"Always Wanted" (featuring G-Eazy)	Jones; Gerald Gillum		3:26
6.	"Rare"	Jones		3:44
7.	"Tell Me" (featuring Jevon Doe)	Jones		4:14
8.	"Benjamin"	Jones		3:41
9.	"Come Down"	Jones; Tyrone Griffin, Jr.		4:00
10.	"Awake"	Jones		4:37
11.	"This Is What It Looks Like"	Jones		5:01
Total length:				45:06

=== Waiting for Paris ===
PJ's second EP was released on May 29, 2020.

No.	Title	Writer(s)	Producer(s)	Length
1.	"Privately"	Paris Alexandria Jones		2;53
2.	"Counterfei"	Paris Alexandria Jones		2:35
3.	"I'm Forreal"	Jones; Luther Nicholson		2:57
4.	"Y'Oh"	Jones		2:46
5.	"Smoke"	Jones		3:48
6.	"Price"	Jones; Glenda Proby		4:26
Total length:				19:00

=== Guest appearances ===
Selected list of non-single guest appearances
Title	Year	Artist	Album
"Mazinger" (featuring PJ)	2015	Lupe Fiasco	Non-album track
"All I Know" (featuring PJ)	2015	Boosie Badazz	Touchdown 2 Cause Hell
"Love Star"	2016	Common, Marsha Ambrosius	Black America Again
"Unfamiliar"	2016	Common	Black America Again

== Writing discography ==
Year	Title	Artist	Album
2014	"True Colors" (featuring Nicki Minaj)	Wiz Khalifa	Blacc Hollywood
2014	"I'm That B.I.T.C.H"	Brianna Perry	Non-album tracks
2014	"My Girl" (featuring Trevor Jackson)	Diggy Simmons	Non-album tracks
2014	"Not for Long" (featuring Trey Songz)	B.o.B	Non-album tracks
2014	"All in a Day's Work"	Danity Kane	DK3
2014	"No Talkin'"	HS87	Non-album tracks
2014	"I Don't Know"	Meek Mill	Non-album tracks
2015	"Finale"	Ty Dolla Sign	Free TC
2015	"Guard Down" (featuring Kanye West and Diddy)	Ty Dolla Sign	Free TC
2015	"Solid" (featuring Babyface)	Ty Dolla Sign	Free TC
2015	"All I Know"	Boosie	Touch Down 2 Cause Hell
2015	"Bitches N Marijuana" (featuring Schoolboy Q)	Chris Brown and Tyga	Fan of a Fan: The Album
2015	"Nothing to Me" (featuring E-40 and Keyshia Cole)	G-Eazy	When It's Dark Out
2015	"I'm Still Here"	Jem and the Holograms	Jem and the Holograms (OST)
2015	"Ride Out"	Kid Ink, Tyga, Wale, YG and Rich Homie Quan	Furious 7 (OST)
2015	"Tied Up" (featuring Dej Loaf)	Casey Veggies	Non-album track
2015	"Deliver"	Lupe Fiasco	Tetsuo & Youth
2016	"Left Right Left"	Charlie Puth	Nine Track Mind
2016	"No Time for It"	Fantasia	The Definition Of
2016	"Love Star" (featuring Marsha Ambrosious)	Common	Black America Again
2016	"Unfamiliar" (featuring PJ)	Common	Black America Again
2016	"Excuse Me"	Kevin Gates	Islah
2016	"Need U"	Usher	Hard II Love
2016	"FWM"	Usher	Hard II Love
2016	"Rivals" (featuring Future)	Usher	Hard II Love
