= Majestic Drama =

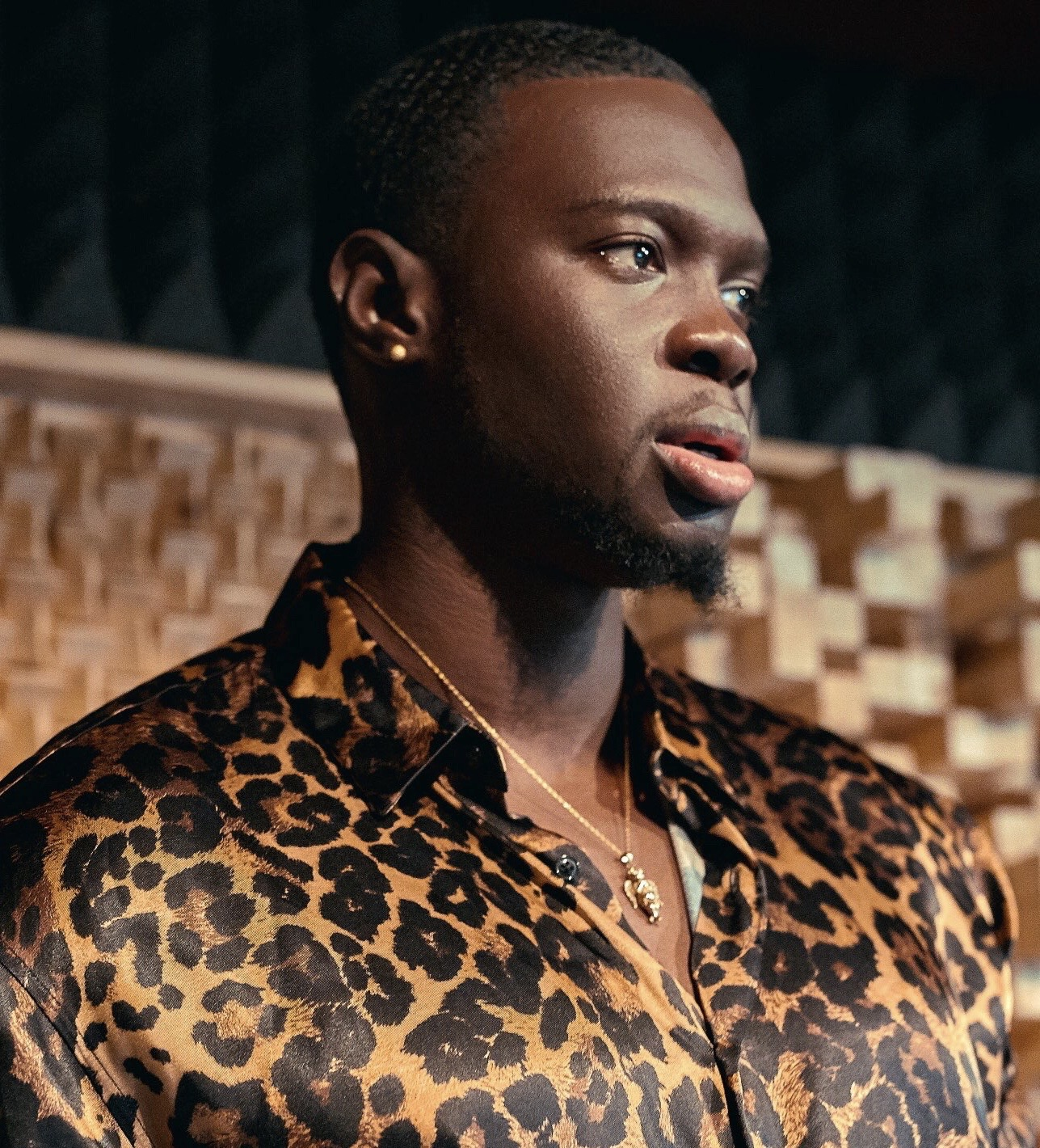

Background information
- Born: October 15, 1990 (age 35); Dakar, Senegal
- Origin: Albany, New York
- Genres: Pop, hip hop, R&B
- Occupations: Record producer; songwriter
- Instruments: Keyboard, synthesizer, drums
- Years active: 2010-present
- Website: majesticdrama.com

Abdoulaye Diop (born October 15, 1990), known professionally as Majestic Drama, is a music producer and songwriter who lets his African origins influence his diverse sound and set himself apart from the crowd. At the age of fourteen, Drama moved from his home in Dakar, Senegal to Albany, New York where he ultimately graduated from high school and moved on to producing music.

As a producer, Drama has produced tracks for Wale, Kid Ink, Fetty Wap, Twista, and French recording artist La Fouine for his hit record, "Toute La Night". His styles include hip hop, R&B, and pop.

== CURE TOKEN ==
In 2021, Majestic Drama has partnered with charity crypto project called "Cure Token" to help fight Pediatric cancer. Backed by The Beckley Foundation, Cure Token has raised $200,000 for pediatric cancer, and is continuing to raise $10,000 daily.

== Production Discography ==
=== 2011 ===
La Fouine - "La Fouine et Laouni (Réédition)"

- "Toute La Night"

=== 2013 ===
The Lonely Island - The Wack Album

- 02. "Go Kindergarten" (feat. Robyn)
- 16. "I Fucked My Aunt" (feat. T-Pain)

=== 2014 ===
Kid Ink - "BatGang: 4b's"

- 14."On Me"

=== 2015 ===
Twista - "Livin Legend EP"

- 5."Keep It On Me"

=== 2016 ===
Hayce Lemsi & Volts Face- "A des années lumières"

- 2."FAYADEM"

=== 2017 ===
Wale - Shine

- 8."MATHEMATICS"

=== 2017 ===
Hayce Lemsi - Eureka

- 2."Havana"

G. Twilight featuring Tory Lanez - Keep It A Hunned

- 01. " Keep It A Hunned " (feat. Tory Lanez)

2020 LORRREY - "Think About It"

- 1. "Think About It (feat. Majestic Drama)"
