= The Matrimony (song) =

Single by Wale featuring Usher

from the album The Album About Nothing
- Released: March 2, 2015
- Recorded: 2015
- Genre: Hip hop; R&B
- Length: 6:35; 4:14 (radio edit)
- Label: Maybach Music Group; Allido; Atlantic
- Songwriters: Olubowale Akintimehin; Usher Raymond IV; Sam Dew; Jacob Dutton; Daniel Tannenbaum; Khalil Abdul-Rahman; Charlie B
- Producers: Jake One; DJ Khalil; Marcè Reazon

Wale singles chronology
"Ride Out" (2015)	"The Matrimony" (2015)	"Coffee" (2015)

Usher singles chronology
"I Don't Mind" (2014)	"The Matrimony" (2015)	"Don't Look Down" (2015)

"The Matrimony" is a song by American hip hop recording artist Wale. It was released on March 2, 2015, as the second single from his fourth studio album The Album About Nothing (2015). The song, produced by Jake One, features a guest appearance from Usher. The song begins with a monologue from Jerry Seinfeld. The song samples artist Daniel "Danny Keyz" Tannenbaum. The song has peaked at number 70 on the US Billboard Hot 100 chart.

== Music video ==
A music video for "The Matrimony" was released on June 8, 2015. It was directed by Sarah McColgan.

== Chart performance ==
"The Matrimony" peaked at number 70 on the US Billboard Hot 100 chart. On July 10, 2018, the song was certified double platinum by the Recording Industry Association of America (RIAA) for sales of over two million digital copies in the United States.

== Charts ==
Chart performance for "The Matrimony"
Chart (2015)	Peak position
US Billboard Hot 100	70
US Hot R&B/Hip-Hop Songs (Billboard)	17
US Rhythmic Airplay (Billboard)	24

== Certifications ==
Certifications for "The Matrimony"
Region	Certification	Certified units/sales
United States (RIAA)	2× Platinum	2,000,000^{‡}
^{‡} Sales+streaming figures based on certification alone.
