= Hello Kimberly Tour =

2016 concert tour by K. Michelle

- Tour by K. Michelle
- Location: United States
- Associated album: More Issues Than Vogue
- Start date: July 12, 2016
- End date: August 14, 2016
- Legs: 1
- No. of shows: 20
- Supporting act: PJ

K. Michelle concert chronology
- My Twisted Mind Tour (2015); Hello Kimberly Tour (2016); The People I Used to Know Tour (2018)

The Hello Kimberly Tour was the third headlining concert tour by American singer K. Michelle. The tour supported her third studio album, More Issues Than Vogue (2016), which peaked at number one on the Billboard Top R&B/Hip-Hop Albums chart and number two on the Billboard 200. Announced in May 2016, the 20-date tour began on July 12 in Boston and concluded on August 14 in Los Angeles. The itinerary included a radio-show appearance in St. Louis and performances in several cities across the United States. The tour featured singer PJ as an opening act.

== Background ==
Michelle announced the tour on May 17, 2016, through social media, describing it as a series of performances in support of More Issues Than Vogue. In her announcement, she told fans that she was ready to have fun on the tour and thanked them for their continued support. The album, released on March 25, debuted at number one on the Billboard Top R&B/Hip-Hop Albums chart and number two on the Billboard 200.

The tour was associated with Jack Daniel's Tennessee Honey, which served as a promotional partner. The tour included meet-and-greet opportunities and signings connected to the brand.

== Concert synopsis ==
At the August 7 performance at the House of Blues in Houston, a voice addressed the audience as the lights dimmed, inviting concertgoers to take out their cameras and cellphones to take pictures. Michelle appeared in a sparkling bodysuit and thigh-high boots, accompanied by two female dancers, a keyboardist and a drummer. She later changed into a black romper with angular shoulders and black boots.

The set featured songs from More Issues Than Vogue, including "Mindful", "Not a Little Bit" and "Maybe I Should Call", alongside earlier material such as "Love 'Em All" and "Can't Raise a Man". Michelle also performed "Miss You, Goodbye" and "Cry". She ended "F You", a song from her 2014 mixtape, with an image of Donald Trump and a raised middle finger, prompting cheers from the crowd.

== Critical reception ==
The Houston, Texas performance received a positive review from Joey Guerra of the Houston Chronicle. Guerra described Michelle as a commanding and expressive vocalist, praising the emotional quality of her singing and her ability to reinterpret her recorded songs onstage. He highlighted "Love 'Em All" as an early standout, while noting the lyrical delivery of "Mindful", the audience participation during "Can't Raise a Man", and the vocal performances on "Miss You, Goodbye" and "Cry". Guerra also observed that the audience knew the songs throughout the performance and that Michelle's music remained accessible despite her lack of crossover success comparable to artists such as Mary J. Blige and Fantasia.

== Opening acts ==
- PJ

== Set list ==
The following is the average set list for the tour, as documented by the concert database setlist.fm:

1. "Mindful"
2. "Rich"
3. "Love 'Em All"
4. "My Life"
5. "Can't Raise a Man"
6. "Build A Man Intro"
7. "The Right One"
8. "Maybe I Should Call"
9. "Miss You, Goodbye"
10. "Cry"
11. "Down in the DM"
12. "Ain't You"
13. "Got Em Like"
14. "V.S.O.P."

Encore

1. "All I Got"

== Tour dates ==
The tour's itinerary was announced in May 2016.

| Date | City | Country | Venue |
|---|---|---|---|
| July 12, 2016 | Boston | United States | House of Blues |
| July 14, 2016 | Richmond | United States | The National |
| July 15, 2016 | Norfolk | United States | The NorVa |
| July 16, 2016 | St. Louis | United States | Scottrade Center (radio show) |
| July 19, 2016 | Philadelphia | United States | The Fillmore Philadelphia |
| July 20, 2016 | Baltimore | United States | Rams Head Live! |
| July 21, 2016 | Silver Spring | United States | The Fillmore Silver Spring |
| July 23, 2016 | Detroit | United States | Chene Park |
| July 27, 2016 | Nashville | United States | Marathon Music Works |
| July 28, 2016 | Greensboro | United States | Cone Denim Entertainment Center |
| July 29, 2016 | Raleigh | United States | The Ritz |
| July 30, 2016 | North Myrtle Beach | United States | House of Blues |
| July 31, 2016 | Atlanta | United States | Fox Theatre |
| August 2, 2016 | Fort Lauderdale | United States | Revolution Live |
| August 5, 2016 | Dallas | United States | House of Blues |
| August 6, 2016 | San Antonio | United States | Aztec Theatre |
| August 7, 2016 | Houston | United States | House of Blues |
| August 12, 2016 | Las Vegas | United States | House of Blues |
| August 13, 2016 | Phoenix | United States | Celebrity Theatre |
| August 14, 2016 | Los Angeles | United States | The Novo |
