= Running Back (Wale song) =

Single by Wale featuring Lil Wayne

from the album Shine
- Released: January 20, 2017
- Genre: Hip hop; trap
- Length: 3:35
- Label: Maybach Music Group; Atlantic; Every Blue Moon
- Songwriters: Olubowale Akintimehin; Dwayne Carter Jr.; Gary Hill, Jr.; Daniel Forrest
- Producer: Spinz Beats Inc

Wale singles chronology
"Make It Work" (2016)	"Running Back" (2017)	"Fashion Week" (2017)

Lil Wayne singles chronology
"Sucker for Pain" (2016)	"Running Back" (2017)	"Changed It" (2017)

Music video
- "Running Back" on YouTube

"Running Back" is a song by American rapper Wale featuring fellow American rapper Lil Wayne. Produced by Spinz Beats Inc., it was released as the fourth single from the former's fifth studio album, Shine (2017).

== Background ==
Wale debuted the track while performing on ESPN's First Take series on January 3, 2017.

== Critical reception ==
Joseph Manthieu of Exclaim! wrote that Wayne's appearance on the track alongside Phil Adé on "Smile" stood out on the album alongside G-Eazy on "Fashion Week". Pitchfork contributor Jonah Bromwich called it "one of the best songs on Shine," highlighting Spinz Beats' production for elevating both rappers' verses. Perry Simpson of HotNewHipHop critiqued that despite Wale's "trademark flair for poetry", he called it "a frustratingly vapid song" filled with "uninspired singing about money stacks."

== Chart performance ==
"Running Back" debuted and peaked at numbers 37 and 100 on both the Billboard Hot R&B/Hip-Hop Songs and Hot 100 charts for the week of February 11, 2017.

== Music video ==
The song's accompanying music video premiered on February 6, 2017 on Wale's account on YouTube. The music video was directed by ACRS. Since its release, the video has received over 14 million views.

== Charts ==
Chart (2017)	Peak position
US Billboard Hot 100	100
US Hot R&B/Hip-Hop Songs (Billboard)	37

== Release history ==
Region	Date	Format	Label	Ref.
United States	January 20, 2017	Digital download	Maybach Music Group; Atlantic	
