= The Body (song) =

Single by Wale featuring Jeremih

from the album The Album About Nothing
- Released: September 9, 2014
- Recorded: 2014
- Genre: Dirty rap; alternative R&B
- Length: 3:52
- Label: Allido; Maybach Music Group; Atlantic
- Songwriters: Olubowale Akintimehin; Jeremih Felton; Kenneth C. Coby; Cartier Grand; Robert Kelly
- Producer: Soundz

Wale singles chronology
"Don't Shoot" (2014)	"The Body" (2014)	"Ride Out" (2015)

Jeremih singles chronology
"Hold You Down" (2014)	"The Body" (2014)	"Bad Bitch" (2014)

"The Body" is a song by American hip hop recording artist Wale. It was released on September 9, 2014, as the first single from his fourth studio album The Album About Nothing (2015). The song, produced by Soundz, features singer Jeremih. It peaked at number 87 on the Billboard Hot 100.

== Music video ==
A music video for the track was released on December 28, 2014. It was directed by Geoffroy Faugerolas.

== Samples ==
The song samples "You Remind Me of Something", as performed by American R&B singer R. Kelly.

== Chart performance ==
"The Body" peaked at number 87 on the US Billboard Hot 100 chart. The song was eventually certified platinum by the Recording Industry Association of America (RIAA) for sales of over 1,000,000 digital copies.

== Charts ==
Chart performance for "The Body"
Chart (2015)	Peak position
US Billboard Hot 100	87
US Hot R&B/Hip-Hop Songs (Billboard)	26

== Certifications ==
Certifications for "The Body"
Region	Certification	Certified units/sales
United States (RIAA)	Platinum	1,000,000^{‡}
^{‡} Sales+streaming figures based on certification alone.
