= Touch (Pia Mia song) =

Single by Pia Mia
- Released: October 30, 2015
- Genre: Tropical pop; R&B
- Length: 3:26
- Label: Wolfpack; Interscope
- Songwriters: Pia Mia; Justin Tranter; Julia Michaels; Tor Erik Hermansen; Mikkel Storleer Eriksen; Michael Tucker
- Producers: Stargate; BloodPop

Pia Mia singles chronology
"Do It Again" (2015)	"Touch" (2015)	"Boys & Girls" (2016)

"Touch" is a song by Guamanian singer Pia Mia. It was released on October 30, 2015, by Wolfpack and Interscope Records. It was written by Mia, and co-written and produced by Stargate. The song peaked at number 47 on both the Australian Singles Chart and the UK Singles Chart.

== Music video ==
A music video to accompany the release of "Touch" was first released onto YouTube on November 5, 2015, at a total length of three minutes and thirty-seven seconds. O'Shea Jackson Jr. makes a cameo appearance as Pia's love interest.

== Track listing ==
Digital download
No.	Title	Length
1.	"Touch"	3:26

== Charts ==
Chart (2015)	Peak position
Australia (ARIA)	47
Ireland (IRMA)	83
Scottish Singles Sales (Official Charts)	28
UK Singles (Official Charts)	47

== Certifications ==
Region	Certification	Certified units/sales
New Zealand (RMNZ)	Gold	15,000^{‡}
United Kingdom (BPI)	Silver	200,000^{‡}
^{‡} Sales+streaming figures based on certification alone.

== Release history ==
Region	Date	Format	Label
United States	October 30, 2015	Digital download	Wolfpack; Interscope
