= Ride Out =

Single by Kid Ink, Tyga, Wale, YG and Rich Homie Quan

from the album Furious 7: Original Motion Picture Soundtrack
- Released: February 17, 2015
- Recorded: 2014
- Genre: Hip hop
- Length: 3:31
- Label: Atlantic
- Songwriters: Brian Collins; Paris Jones; Micheal Stevenson; Olubowale Akintimehin; Keenon Jackson; Dequantes D. Lamar; Jamie Sanderson
- Producers: Kevin Weaver; Mike Caren

Kid Ink singles chronology
"Hotel" (2015)	"Ride Out" (2015)	"Worth It" (2015)

Tyga singles chronology
"Bitches N Marijuana" (2015)	"Ride Out" (2015)	"Do It Again" (2015)

Wale singles chronology
"The Body" (2015)	"Ride Out" (2015)	"The Matrmony" (2015)

YG singles chronology
"2015 Flow" (2014)	"Ride Out" (2015)	"Twist My Fingaz" (2015)

Rich Homie Quan singles chronology
"Flex (Ooh, Ooh, Ooh)" (2015)	"Ride Out" (2015)	"Save Dat Money" (2015)

Music video
- "Ride Out" on YouTube

"Ride Out" is a song by American rappers Kid Ink, Tyga, Wale, YG, and Rich Homie Quan, taken from the soundtrack of the American action film Furious 7. It was released as a lead single of the soundtrack alongside the promotional single "Go Hard or Go Home," on February 17, 2015.

== Music video ==
The song's accompanying music video premiered on February 16, 2015 on Atlantic Records account on YouTube. Since its release, the video has received over 285 million views.

== Charts ==
Chart (2015)	Peak position
Australia (ARIA)	44
Austria (Ö3 Austria Top 40)	26
Belgium (Ultratip Bubbling Under Flanders)	62
Belgium Urban (Ultratop Flanders)	16
Canada Hot 100 (Billboard)	48
France (SNEP)	51
Germany (GfK)	21
Hungary (Single Top 40)	24
Scotland Singles (OCC)	57
Switzerland (Schweizer Hitparade)	25
UK Singles (OCC)	70
US Billboard Hot 100	70
US Hot R&B/Hip-Hop Songs (Billboard)	22
US Hot Rap Songs (Billboard)	14

== Certifications ==
Region	Certification	Certified units/sales
Canada (Music Canada)	Platinum	80,000^{‡}
United States (RIAA)	Gold	500,000^{‡}
^{‡} Sales+streaming figures based on certification alone.
