= Pia Mia =

American singer, actress, and author (born 1996)

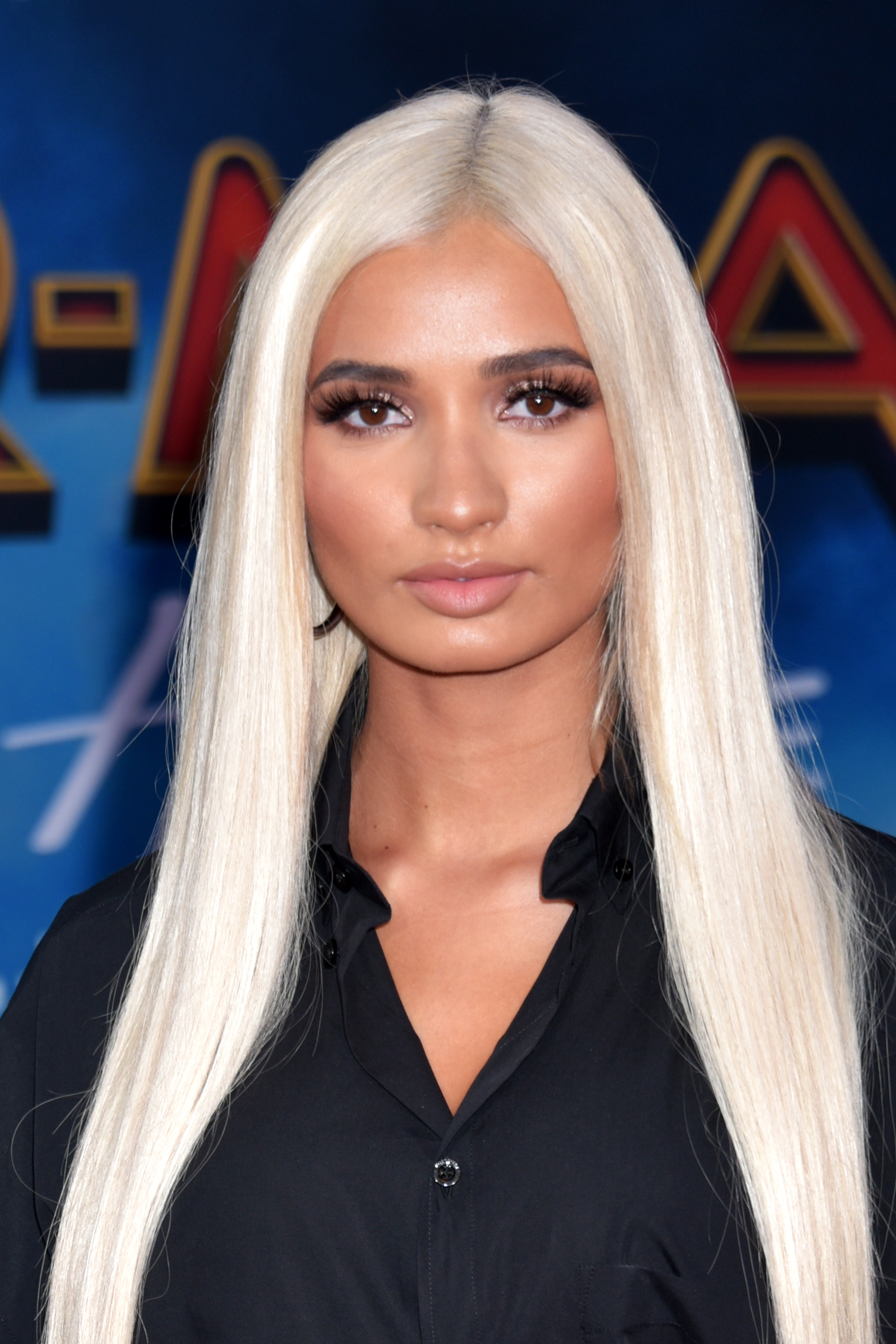
- Pia Mia at the Los Angeles premiere of Spider-Man: Far From Home in June 2019

Background information
- Born: Pia Mia Perez; September 19, 1996 (age 30); Guam
- Genres: R&B; pop; hip hop
- Occupations: Singer; actress; author
- Instrument: Vocals
- Years active: 2013–present
- Labels: Wolfpack; Interscope; Electric Feel; Republic; Cherry Pie; Treehouse
- Website: www.piamiamusic.com

Pia Mia Perez (born September 19, 1996) is a Guamanian singer, actress, and author. She began her music career posting song covers on YouTube; after being discovered by Babyface, she moved to Los Angeles in 2010 at age 13 to pursue a music career. In 2013, she signed with Interscope Records and worked with producer Nic Nac on her debut extended play (EP), The Gift (2013), which included her viral cover of Drake's 2013 single, "Hold On, We're Going Home".

In 2015, she released the single "Do It Again" (featuring Chris Brown and Tyga); the song was a success, marking her only entry on the Billboard Hot 100 and receiving platinum certification by the Recording Industry Association of America (RIAA). The following year, she appeared on will.i.am's single "Boys & Girls"; it peaked within the top 40 of the UK singles chart. She left Interscope in 2017, before signing to Electric Feel Entertainment and Republic Records in 2020; she departed both the following year. Her debut studio album, Anti Romantica, was released independently in 2024.

Outside of music, Perez is also an author and actress. She has released three novels in partnership with Wattpad, and has appeared in several television shows; along with a role as Tristan in the 2019 film After and its 2020 sequel After We Collided.

== Early life ==
Pia Mia Perez was born on September 19, 1996, on Guam, an unincorporated territory of the United States. She is of Chamorro, Italian, and Dutch descent, and is the daughter of Angela Terlaje Perez and Peter Perez Jr. In Guam, Perez performed at weddings and other community events, and attended St. John's School before moving to Los Angeles in 2010 at age 13 with her mother to pursue her music career professionally.

== Career ==
=== 2013–2017: The Gift, The Gift 2 and breakthrough ===
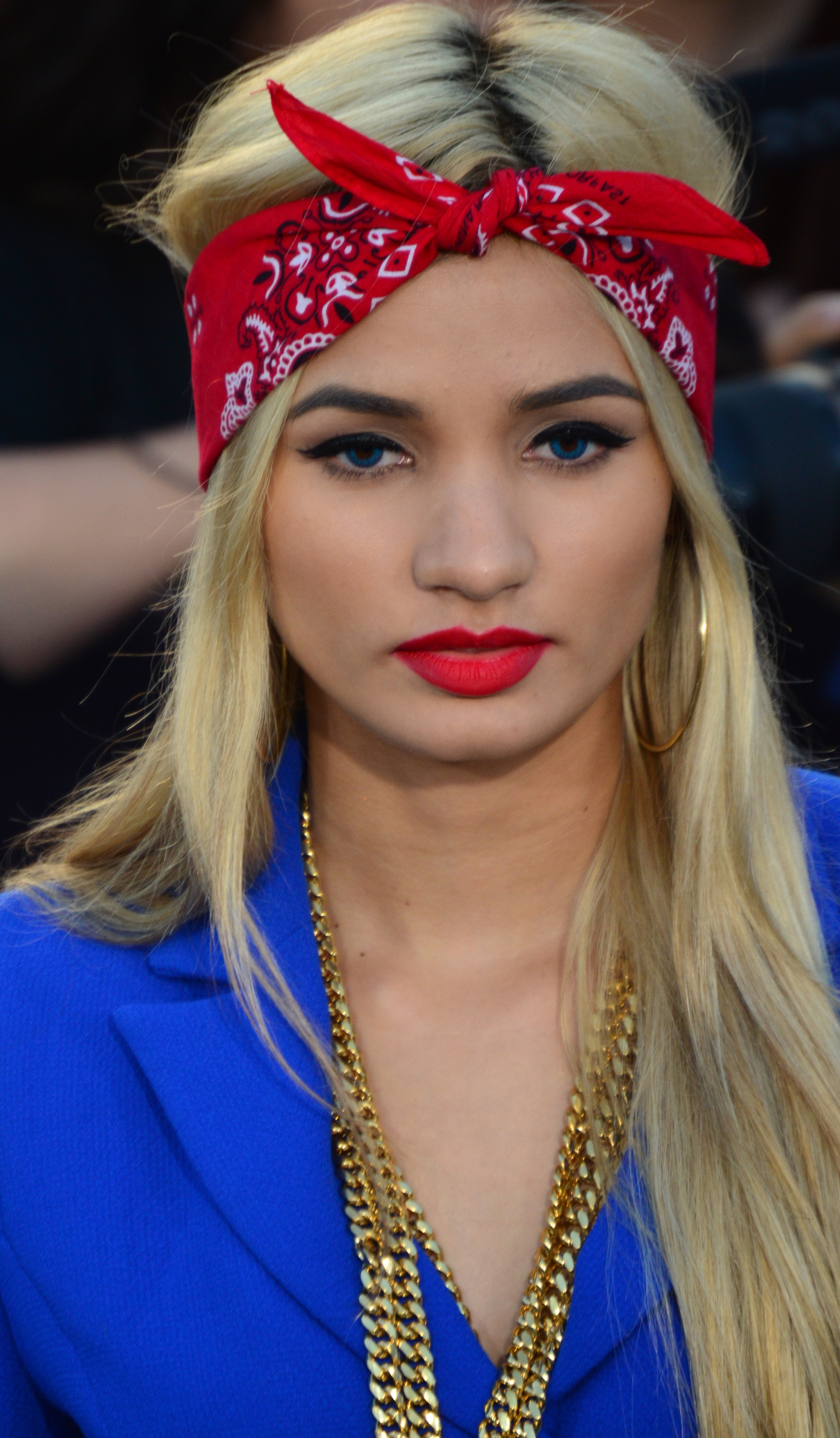
Pia Mia at the Los Angeles premiere of Divergent on March 18, 2014

Perez was discovered by and worked with producer Babyface during her first year in Los Angeles. By 2013, she was introduced to record executive Abou "Bu" Thiam, and began working on material with producer Nic Nac and regularly uploaded covers to YouTube. In late 2013, Kylie Jenner, a close friend, invited Perez to a family dinner, during which she was asked to sing her cover of Drake's single "Hold On, We're Going Home", who was also in attendance. Kim Kardashian uploaded a video of the performance to her social media; the video it gained over a million views. Following the viral success, she released her first song "Red Love" on December 9, 2013, along with its music video. Her debut extended play The Gift was released online for free later that month with eight tracks.

In February 2014, Pia Mia signed a multi-album deal with American record label Interscope Records. The same month, Perez and Chance the Rapper released an original song "Fight for You" for the 2014 science-fiction action film Divergent. The song was featured on the film's original soundtrack. Perez began working on her debut album in 2014 and recorded roughly 100 songs over the next year.

In early 2015, she released the promotional single "Fuck with U" featuring American rapper G-Eazy. It was initially intended to be the first single from Perez's debut studio album under Interscope, but was later scrapped. On May 4, 2015, Perez released "Do It Again", which featured vocals from Chris Brown and Tyga, and became Perez's first charting song. It reached number eight on the UK Top 40, number seventy-one on the US Billboard Hot 100 chart, number nineteen on the Rhythmic Songs chart, and number seventy on the Canadian Hot 100. On October 30, 2015, Perez released the follow-up single "Touch", produced by Stargate and BloodPop. It reached number forty seven in Australia and charted on the UK Singles Chart.

In 2016, Perez was featured on will.i.am's single "Boys & Girls" which peaked in the top 40 on the UK Singles Chart. Perez released the promotional single "We Should Be Together" on December 15, 2016.

On May 25, 2017, Perez released the single "I'm a Fan" featuring Jeremih, before parting ways with Interscope Records and Wolfpack Entertainment in late 2017. She stated that she did not have enough creative freedom under the label and that there were excessive delays with her music. On December 15, she self-released her second EP The Gift 2, which was preceded by the promotional single, "Off My Feet", which was released on December 1, 2017.

=== 2019–2023: Acting, label changes, My Side, Christmas ===
In 2019, Perez made her acting debut, portraying Tristan in the film After. Correspondingly, she released the single, "Bitter Love", which served as the film's theme song. On June 20, 2019, Perez released "Crybaby" featuring Theron Theron as a promotional single. Following this, she released the standalone singles "Feel Up" with American rapper YG on September 5, 2019, and "Don't Get Me Started" with rapper Gunna and producer Carnage on October 2, 2019. All four singles were released under Perez's independent record label Cherry Pie Records.

On May 14, 2020, it was announced that Perez had signed to Electric Feel Entertainment and Republic Records. Perez released the single "Princess", her first single released under her new label, on May 15, 2020. In an interview with Idolator, Perez confirmed the release of the single "Hot", which was intended to feature on her then-upcoming debut studio album under Electric Feel and Republic; the album was scrapped. "Hot" was released on July 24, 2020, and was later accompanied by a visualizer for the song shot on Guam; it was released on September 14. A remix of the song featuring Sean Paul and Flo Milli was released on October 27, 2020, and a music video for the remix version was released on October 30.

In 2020, Perez announced that she had written her first novel titled The Princess Diaries: Sand, Sequins and Silicone which was released via Wattpad. On October 1, 2021, Perez released the My Side EP, which was preceded by the singles "730" and "Only One". The EP is her first since 2017's The Gift 2. A holiday EP titled Christmas was released one month later on November 1, 2021.

=== 2024-present: Anti Romantica, novels ===
On September 23, 2024, Perez released her debut studio album Anti Romantica ten years after her debut EP. In the interview with Cake the Mag, Perez stated that the title of the album was inspired by her experiences in Hollywood and the music industry. The deluxe version was released three months later on December 13, 2024. Her second novel, titled Sand, Sequins & Silicone, was released in 2024, followed by her third novel Diamonds, Deception & Destiny in 2025.

In January 2026, Perez officially released the standalone single "Underneath" featuring Nic Nac. The song was previously released in an unfinished form to SoundCloud in 2016, and was remastered and released on January 30, 2026. On March 13, Perez released the single "Island Girl" which was followed by "Hey Haters" on May 22; the latter is part of Diane Warren's reggae compilation album named Songs in the Key Of Diane.

== Discography ==
=== Studio albums ===
Title	Details
Anti Romantica	Released: September 13, 2024; Format: Digital download, streaming; Label: Cherry Pie Records, Treehouse Records

=== Extended plays ===
Title	Details
The Gift	Released: December 23, 2013; Format: Digital download; Label: Wolfpack, Interscope
The Gift 2	Released: December 15, 2017; Format: Digital download, streaming; Label: Pia Mia Recordings
My Side	Released: October 1, 2021; Format: Digital download, streaming; Label: Cherry Pie Records
Christmas	Released: November 1, 2021; Format: Digital download, streaming; Label: Cherry Pie Records

=== Singles ===
==== As lead artist ====
List of singles, with selected chart positions and certifications
Title	Year	Peak chart positions										Certifications	Album
Title	Year	US	AUS	BEL (Wa)	CAN	DEN	IRE	NZ	SCO	SWE	UK	Certifications	Album
"Red Love"	2013	—	—	—	—	—	—	—	—	—	—		The Gift
"Mr. President"	2014	—	—	—	—	—	—	—	—	—	—		The Gift
"Do It Again" (featuring Chris Brown and Tyga)	2015	71	5	39	70	38	52	10	15	70	8	RIAA: Platinum; ARIA: Platinum; BPI: 2× Platinum; GLF: Gold; IFPI DEN: Platinum; RMNZ: 4× Platinum	Non-album singles
"Touch"	2015	—	47	—	—	—	83	— (Note: "Touch" did not enter the NZ Top 40 Singles Chart, but peaked at number 10 on the NZ Heatseekers chart.)	28	—	47	BPI: Silver; RMNZ: Gold	Non-album singles
"I'm a Fan" (featuring Jeremih)	2017	—	—	—	—	—	—	—	—	—	—		Non-album singles
"Bitter Love"	2019	—	—	—	—	—	—	—	—	—	—		Non-album singles
"Princess"	2020	—	—	—	—	—	—	—	—	—	—		Non-album singles
"Hot" (solo or remix featuring Sean Paul and Flo Milli)	2020	—	—	—	—	—	—	—	—	—	—		Non-album singles
"730"	2021	—	—	—	—	—	—	—	—	—	—		My Side
"Only One"	2021	—	—	—	—	—	—	—	—	—	—		My Side
"Repeat After Me"	2024	—	—	—	—	—	—	—	—	—	—		Anti Romantica
"—" denotes releases that did not chart or were not released in that territory.

==== As featured artist ====
List of featured singles, with selected chart positions and certifications
Title	Year	Peak chart positions							Certifications	Album
Title	Year	AUS	BEL (Wa)	FRA	GER	IRE	SCO	UK	Certifications	Album
"Boys & Girls" (will.i.am featuring Pia Mia)	2016	53	17	46	39	42	14	21	BPI: Silver	Non-album singles
"Cuddled Up" (John Lindahl featuring Pia Mia)	2020	—	—	—	—	—	—	—		Non-album singles
"Lovefool" (twocolors featuring Pia Mia)	2020	—	—	—	—	—	—	—		Non-album singles
"Good Luck" (James Hype featuring Pia Mia)	2021	—	—	—	—	—	—	—		Non-album singles
"How We Do It" (Sean Paul featuring Pia Mia)	2022	—	—	—	—	—	—	—		Scorcha
"—" denotes releases that did not chart or were not released in that territory.

=== Promotional singles ===
Title	Year	Certifications	Album
"Bubblegum Boy" (with Bella Thorne)	2011		Non-album singles
"The Last Man On Earth"	2012		Non-album singles
"Shotgun Love"	2012		The Gift
"What a Girl Wants"	2012		Non-album singles
"Fuck with U" (featuring G-Eazy)	2015	RMNZ: Gold	Non-album singles
"We Should Be Together"	2016		Non-album singles
"Off My Feet"	2017		The Gift 2
"Crybaby" (featuring Theron Theron)	2019		Non-album singles
"Feel Up" (with YG)	2019		Non-album singles
"Don't Get Me Started" (with Gunna and Carnage)	2019		Non-album singles
"You Win"	2024		Anti Romantica
"Sugar"	2024		Anti Romantica
"Best Life"	2025		Non-album single

=== Guest appearances ===
Title	Year	Other artist(s)	Album
"Fight for You"	2014	Chance the Rapper	Divergent: Original Motion Picture Soundtrack

== Filmography ==
=== Film ===
Year	Title	Role	Notes
2019	After	Tristan	
2020	After We Collided	Tristan	

=== Television ===
Year	Title	Role	Notes
2013 — 2015	Keeping Up With The Kardashians	Herself	Episodes: Season 8– Episode 6: "Some Moms Just Wanna Have Fun" (2013), Season 8– Episode 20: "Kylie's Sweet 16"(2013; uncredited), Season 11– Episode 3: "Rites of Passage" (2015).
2016	East Los High	Herself	Episode: "You're Dancing Like a Gringo"
2018	Happy Together	Rylie Conners	Episode: "Pilot"

== Bibliography ==
- The Princess Diaries: Sand, Glitter and Silicone (2020)
- Sand, Sequins & Silicone (2024)
- Diamonds, Deception & Destiny (2025)
