= My PYT =

Single by Wale

from the album Shine
- Released: May 20, 2016
- Recorded: 2016
- Genre: Hip hop
- Length: 3:55
- Label: Maybach Music Group; Atlantic
- Songwriter(s): Olubowale Akintimehin; Sam Sneak; The Dope Boyz; James Ingram; Quincy Jones; Marvin Gaye; Odell Brown; David Ritz
- Producer(s): The Dope Boyz

Wale singles chronology
"Coffee" (2015)	"My PYT" (2016)	"Make It Work" (2016)

Music video
- "My PYT" on YouTube

"My PYT" is a song by American rapper Wale featuring uncredited vocals from Sam Sneak for his studio album, Shine. The track peaked at number 54 on the Billboard Hot 100.

== Background and release ==
On May 9, 2016, Wale tweeted a line from the song on his Twitter. On May 20, 2016, Wale released the song on iTunes.

The song interpolates the chorus of "P.Y.T. (Pretty Young Thing)" by Michael Jackson and contains a sample of "Sexual Healing" by Marvin Gaye and The Fix by Nelly.

== Music video ==
The video of the song was released on July 25, 2016 on YouTube. The video features various video models including Chasity Samone.

== Charts ==
=== Weekly charts ===
Chart (2016)	Peak position
US Billboard Hot 100	54
US Hot R&B/Hip-Hop Songs (Billboard)	16
US Rhythmic (Billboard)	5

=== Year-end charts ===
Chart (2016)	Position
US Hot R&B/Hip-Hop Songs (Billboard)	54
US Rhythmic (Billboard)	42

== Certifications ==
Region	Certification	Certified units/sales
Canada (Music Canada)	Gold	40,000^{‡}
United States (RIAA)	Platinum	1,000,000^{‡}
^{‡} Sales+streaming figures based on certification alone.
