= Bad Bitch =

Single by French Montana featuring Jeremih
- Released: December 15, 2014
- Recorded: 2014
- Genre: Hip hop
- Length: 4:04
- Label: Bad Boy, Interscope
- Songwriters: Karim Kharbouch, Jeremy Felton, Remo Green
- Producer: Remo the Hitmaker

French Montana singles chronology
| "Ball Drop" (2014) | "Bad Bitch" (2014) | "Off the Rip" (2015) |

Jeremih singles chronology
| "The Body" (2014) | "Bad Bitch" (2014) | "Somebody" (2015) |

Music video
- "Bad Bitch" on YouTube

"Bad Bitch" (edited as "Bad B*tch") is a song by hip hop recording artist French Montana, featuring vocals from American R&B singer Jeremih. It was released on December 15, 2014, as a standalone single.

== Music video ==
The music video for "Bad Bitch" was directed by Eif Rivera and released on February 23, 2015. It features cameo appearances by Travi$ Scott, Lil Durk and DJ Khaled.

== Remix ==
The official remix features French Montana and Jeremih along with additional rap verses from Rick Ross and Fabolous.

== Track listing ==
Digital single

| No. | Title | Writer(s) | Producer(s) | Length |
|---|---|---|---|---|
| 1. | "Bad B*tch" (featuring Jeremih) | Karim Kharbouch, Remo Green, Jeremy Phillip Felton | Remo the Hitmaker | 4:04 |

== Charts ==
| Chart (2015) | Peak position |
|---|---|
| US Billboard Hot 100 | 95 |
| US Hot R&B/Hip-Hop Songs (Billboard) | 29 |
