= Do It Again (Pia Mia song) =

2015 single by Pia Mia

Single by Pia Mia featuring Chris Brown and Tyga
- Released: May 4, 2015
- Recorded: 2013–2014
- Genre: Pop; R&B
- Length: 3:27
- Label: Wolfpack; Interscope
- Songwriters: Pia Mia; Jerry Afemata; George Veikoso; Nicholas Balding; Marc Griffin; Michael Ray Nguyen-Stevenson
- Producer: Nic Nac

Pia Mia singles chronology
"Mr. President" (2014)	"Do It Again" (2015)	"Touch" (2015)

Chris Brown singles chronology
"Fun" (2015)	"Do It Again" (2015)	"How Many Times" (2015)

Tyga singles chronology
"Ride Out" (2015)	"Do It Again" (2015)	"Hollywood Niggaz" (2015)

Music video
- "Do It Again" on YouTube

"Do It Again" is a song by Guamanian singer Pia Mia, featuring Chris Brown and Tyga. It was released on May 4, 2015, through Wolfpack and Interscope Records. A pop and R&B song, with elements of hip hop and electronic dance music, Mia initially recorded "Do It Again" in 2013. The song interpolates J Boog's 2011 song "Let's Do It Again", and its lyrics include references to Guamanian culture, such as Two Lovers Point. After the song was played in a recording session in 2014, Brown and Tyga were added to the track. The song was written by Mia and Tyga alongside George Veikoso, Marc Griffin, and producer Nic Nac. J Boog also received a writing credit for the sampling of "Let's Do It Again".

"Do It Again" peaked at number five on the ARIA Singles Chart in Australia and at number eight on the UK Singles Chart, while also charting at number 71 on the US Billboard Hot 100. The song attained platinum or multi-platinum certifications in five countries and appeared on the 2015 year-end charts in Australia and the United Kingdom at positions 53 and 60 respectively.

The Colin Tilley-directed music video was filmed at a beach in Malibu, California, and was released on June 26, 2015. It depicts the three artists performing at a beach and gathering at a cabana. Mia performed "Do It Again" at an American Express concert and as an opening act on Jason Derulo's Australian tour leg in 2015. In April 2020, a dance challenge of the song uploaded by Noah Schnapp on social media platform TikTok went viral, with celebrities such as Jimmy Fallon, Jennifer Lopez, Charli D'Amelio, and Addison Rae participating.

== Background and development ==
Pia Mia saw her first concert in January 2011, when reggae artist J Boog performed in Guam. She then recorded "Do It Again" with Marc Griffin and producer Nic Nac in 2013, after being inspired by J Boog's concert. In 2014, after the song finished production, Mia walked into a studio session with Nic Nac, Chris Brown and Tyga, when "Do It Again" was played. Brown and Tyga were impressed and asked to be included, describing it as "super dope". Mia was touched by their genuine interest in the song and accepted, and she was able to learn from their work ethic in the studio.

"Do It Again" was one of the earliest songs recorded for Mia's debut studio album, as recording had concluded before she signed a deal with Interscope Records. Mia constantly fought the label for the song to be released, which she stated "was [her] heart". She eventually left Interscope without releasing a studio album, explaining that the songs released during her time at the label were primarily chosen by the executives.

In September 2014, British radio presenter Max announced on Twitter that Mia had enlisted Brown and Tyga to appear on "Do It Again". The song was released on digital download and streaming formats on May 4, 2015, and was distributed to rhythmic radio stations in the United States on May 11, 2015. It began rotation on a BBC Radio 1 playlist in the United Kingdom on September 4, 2015, and was sent to radio stations in Italy on October 16, 2015. "Do It Again" was written by Mia, Jerry Afemata, George Veikoso, Griffin, Tyga, and the producer Nic Nac.

== Composition and critical reception ==
"Do It Again"
A 20 second sample of the song, which samples J Boog's song "Let's Do It Again" and is considered a "summer song" by music critics. Mia undulates over a club-infused instrumental with sultry and controlled vocals.

"Do It Again" is a pop and R&B song, which mixes genres of hip hop and electronic dance music. It interpolates J Boog's 2011 song "Let's Do It Again", and is considered to be a "twist" on the track. "Do It Again" opens with synthesizers that utilize a crescendo, as Tyga raps in the first verse before Mia appears to sing 30 seconds into the song. Her voice was consistently undulated to sound "sultry [and] controlled", over a club-infused instrumental. Brown additionally incorporates a verse.

Mia described the lyrics as "wanting to be more than just friends with someone you're really close with, but you haven't crossed the line yet". She denied that it was about a one-night stand, insisting that she never had one before so she could not speak about it. The lyrics in Tyga's rap name-drop German automaker Mercedes-Benz, American football quarterback Tom Brady, and Marcia Brady from the American sitcom The Brady Bunch. Mia incorporated references to Guamanian culture throughout the song, such as mentioning Two Lovers Point.

The song was met with mostly positive reviews, with music critics described "Do It Again" as a "summer song". Writing for Teen Vogue, Tehrene Firman stated that the song is "fun [and] catchy", while Mike Wass of Idolator opined that the anthem is "infectious". Nick Levine of Vice acknowledged that the track's "brilliance creeps up on you like an inappropriate crush". Writing for the Belfast Telegraph, Blast 106 disc jockey Kathryn B Wilson described "Do It Again" as "infectious" and praised Tyga's rap verse for "[setting] a decent tone for Mia's vocals". She commended the chorus for allowing people to sing along while dancing to the track during the weekend. Writing in 2020, Wonderland staff retrospectively stated that the rhythms in the song "transcended age".

== Commercial performance ==
In Australia, "Do It Again" debuted at number 42 on the ARIA Singles Chart dated July 12, 2015. The song peaked at number five on the chart dated August 9, 2015, and charted for 16 weeks. The song was eventually certified platinum by the Australian Recording Industry Association (ARIA) on September 5, 2015, for shipping 70,000 copies. "Do It Again" ranked at number 53 on ARIA's 2015 year-end chart. In New Zealand, the song debuted at number 29 on the New Zealand Singles Chart, where it reached number 10 and charted for 15 weeks. It was certified quadruple platinum by Recorded Music NZ (RMNZ) after sales of 120,000 equivalent-units.

"Do It Again" debuted at number 67 on the UK Singles Chart dated August 20, 2015. It peaked at number eight on October 2, 2015, and remained on the chart for 28 weeks. The song was ranked at number 60 on the 2015 year-end chart, and certified double platinum by the British Phonographic Industry (BPI) for sales and streams of 1,200,000 units on June 24, 2022. In Scotland, "Do It Again" bowed at number 15 on the chart dated August 21, 2015, after debuting the previous week at number 52. In the United States, the song reached number 71 on the Billboard Hot 100 chart dated August 22, 2015, where it charted for 11 weeks. It received a platinum certification by the Recording Industry Association of America (RIAA) for selling 1,000,000 copies on February 15, 2017. "Do It Again" peaked at number 70 on the Canadian Hot 100 chart dated August 29, 2015, where it charted for 11 weeks.

== Music video ==
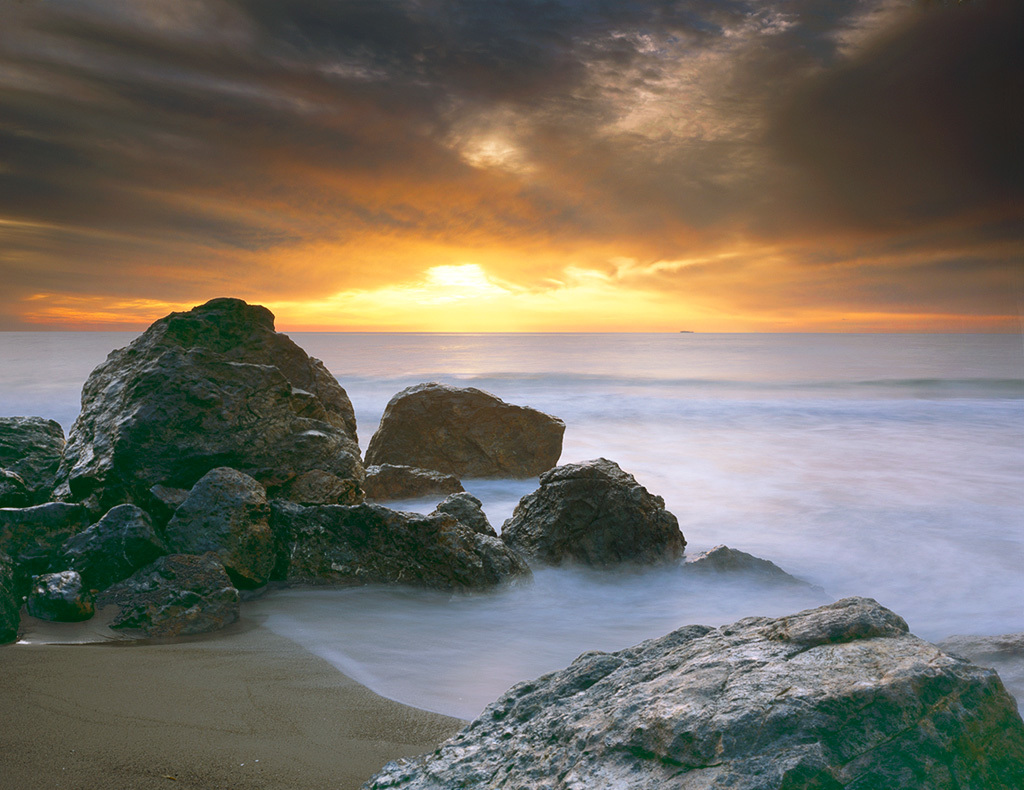
The music video was filmed at a beach in Malibu, California.

A lyric video for "Do It Again" was released with the song on May 4, 2015. The video is animated and inspired by the culture of Guam, with references to artwork and Mia's ancestry to the Chamorro people. It includes latte stones and talaya throwing. An accompanying music video was filmed in Malibu, California, on June 3, 2015, and released on June 26, 2015. The video was directed by Colin Tilley, while Kylie Jenner also appeared on set during production to support the artists. Law Roach was the stylist during the shoot. Mia wore two Guam seal pendants, while Brown's attire consisted of matching yellow Dsquared² embroidered jacket and hockney pants, with white Nike Roshe Run shoes. Mia explained to Flaunt in 2020 that filming the music video was a smooth process where "everyone was really having fun", reminiscing that she would "never forget that time". As of May 2021, the music video has over 494 million views on YouTube.

The video begins with Tyga rapping atop a cliff facing the ocean, which transitions to Mia sporting a red bandana in a white Jeep Wrangler with two other women while being driven along the coastline. Mia poses in various colored bikinis, before dancing on the beach while flipping her hair. Brown is next shown inside a cave near the rocks, sporting a yellow tracksuit with sunglasses. Mia rolls around in the sand and frolics on the beach, before rendezvousing at a late night party in a cabana with Tyga and Brown.

== Live performances and dance challenge ==
Mia performed "Do It Again" at the American Express Unstaged: Artists in Residence summit on August 20, 2015, which also included Rae Sremmurd, Børns, and Gavin James. She performed "stripped-down" covers of Drake's 2013 song "Hold On, We're Going Home" and Fetty Wap's 2014 song "Trap Queen", before concluding the set with "Dum Dada" and "Do It Again". During her performance on 5 Towers at Universal CityWalk Hollywood on August 22, 2015, Mia invited Kylie Jenner onto the stage to perform the song with Tyga. Mia performed "Do It Again" on the Australian breakfast television show Sunrise while joining American singer Jason Derulo on the Australian leg of his 2015 tour as an opening act, where she debuted the live performance of her 2015 song "Touch" and performed "Do It Again". Writing in a review of Derulo's concert at Rod Laver Arena in Melbourne, The Music writer Michael Prebeg described Mia's set as an "exciting high-energy performance" and stated that it was a "great way" to start the concert.

In April 2020, American actor Noah Schnapp uploaded a dance challenge of "Do It Again" on social media platform TikTok. The video went viral, with internet celebrities such as Charli D'Amelio and Addison Rae participating, while Jimmy Fallon and Jennifer Lopez performed the dance five times on The Tonight Show Starring Jimmy Fallon. Mia acknowledged that the challenge was a "resurgence" for the song and stated that she felt proud that everyone was embracing one of her "most special songs".

== Track listing ==
Digital download – single
No.	Title	Length
1.	"Do It Again" (featuring Chris Brown & Tyga)	3:27

== Credits and personnel ==
Credits adapted from Tidal.

- Pia Mia – vocals, songwriter
- Chris Brown – vocals
- Michael Ray Nguyen-Stevenson (Tyga) – vocals, songwriter
- Nicholas Balding (Nic Nac) – songwriter, producer
- Jerry Afemata (J Boog) – songwriter
- George Veikoso – songwriter
- Marc Griffin – songwriter

== Charts ==
=== Weekly charts ===
Weekly chart performance for "Do It Again"
Chart (2015)	Peak position
Australia (ARIA)	5
Australia Urban (ARIA)	2
Belgium (Ultratip Bubbling Under Flanders)	64
Belgium Urban (Ultratop Flanders)	31
Belgium (Ultratip Bubbling Under Wallonia)	39
Canada Hot 100 (Billboard)	70
Czech Republic Singles Digital (ČNS IFPI)	74
Denmark (Tracklisten)	38
Ireland (IRMA)	52
Netherlands (Single Tip)	3
New Zealand (Recorded Music NZ)	10
Scottish Singles Sales (Official Charts)	15
Slovakia Singles Digital (ČNS IFPI)	69
Sweden (Sverigetopplistan)	70
UK Singles (Official Charts)	8
US Billboard Hot 100	71
US Rhythmic Airplay (Billboard)	19

=== Year-end charts ===
Year-end chart performance for "Do It Again" in 2015
Chart (2015)	Position
Australia (ARIA)	53
Australia Urban (ARIA)	11
UK Singles (Official Charts Company)	60

== Certifications ==
Certifications for "Do It Again"
Region	Certification	Certified units/sales
Australia (ARIA)	Platinum	70,000^{‡}
Brazil (Pro-Música Brasil)	Platinum	60,000^{‡}
Denmark (IFPI Danmark)	Platinum	90,000^{‡}
New Zealand (RMNZ)	4× Platinum	120,000^{‡}
Poland (ZPAV)	Gold	10,000^{‡}
Sweden (GLF)	Gold	20,000^{‡}
United Kingdom (BPI)	2× Platinum	1,200,000^{‡}
United States (RIAA)	Platinum	1,000,000^{‡}
^{‡} Sales+streaming figures based on certification alone.

== Release history ==
Release dates and formats for "Do It Again"
Region	Date	Format	Label	Ref.
Various	May 4, 2015	Digital download; streaming	Interscope; Wolfpack	
United States	May 11, 2015	Rhythmic contemporary	Interscope; Wolfpack	
United Kingdom	September 4, 2015	Contemporary hit radio	Interscope; Wolfpack	
Italy	October 16, 2015	Contemporary hit radio	Universal	
