= The Album About Nothing =

Studio album by Wale
- Released: March 31, 2015
- Recorded: 2013–2015
- Genre: Hip-hop
- Length: 60:04
- Labels: Allido; Maybach; Atlantic
- Producers: No Credit; Rex Kudo; J Gramm; Jake One; DJ Khalil; Soundz; Osinachi Nwaneri; Pro Reese; AyyDot; Marcè Reazon; DJ Dahi; Best Kept Secret; Sonny Digital; Dave Glass Animals; Stokley Williams; Frank Dukes

Wale chronology
The Gifted (2013)	The Album About Nothing (2015)	Summer on Sunset (2016)

Alternative cover
- Alternate cover

Alternative cover
- Physical cover

Singles from The Album About Nothing
- 1. "The Body" Released: September 9, 2014; 2. "The Matrimony" Released: March 2, 2015

The Album About Nothing is the fourth studio album by American rapper Wale. It was released on March 31, 2015, by Allido Records, Maybach Music Group and Atlantic Records. The album serves as a continuation of Wale's Seinfeld-themed mixtape series. Recording sessions took place between 2013 and 2015. The production on the album was handled by multiple producers including Frank Dukes, Jake One, Sonny Digital, DJ Dahi, Pro Reese and DJ Khalil among others. The album also features guest appearances by J. Cole, Jeremih, Usher and SZA.

The Album About Nothing was supported by two singles: "The Body" featuring Jeremih, and "The Matrimony" featuring Usher. The album received generally positive reviews from music critics and was a commercial success. It debuted at number one on the US Billboard 200 chart, earning 100,000 album-equivalent units in its first week.

== Background ==
In January 2013, it was reported Wale was working on a new album, titled The Album About Nothing with Jerry Seinfeld. Seinfeld spoke about how the collaboration came to be, saying: "Wale called me, came to my show and we hung out a little bit. He wanted me to do something with him. I didn't understand it, but he did and then I kind of liked the guy, I dug the guy, and I listened to his music, I liked the music. So I said alright, I'll do it, even though I didn't know what I was going to do. So I said to my wife, 'I'm doing this thing with this guy Wale' and she said, 'Wale is my favorite Hip Hop artist. I have every single thing.' Somehow, she missed anything that had to do with me, but has every other cut, everything else he's done. I said just type in Wale and me and see what comes up."

In September 2014, Wale spoke about how Seinfeld inspired the album, saying:

"I was a big fan of Larry David and Jerry Seinfeld. I watched the show a lot. So I did a Mixtape About Nothing in 2007. I just poked a lot of fun at society and the industry ‘cause what was hot at the time was ‘snap your fingers’ and all that. So I had an interesting perspective on the industry. Basically I just ran with that, I did a Mixtape About Nothing and I used a lot of dialogue from Seinfeld. And then, 2010, you know, by this point I’m signed to Interscope and I have a different perspective on things and I did the More About Nothing mixtape. I used more dialogue from Seinfeld. Now, we’re here in 2014, I’m using a lot of personal things and things that are going on in my life now as well as exclusive content from Jerry Seinfeld and a little bit of the show."

In January 2015, Wale spoke about how it is his most personal album, saying: "It's super personal. It's like a journal that my whole lifestyle is based around. Before, with my music, I was like the point guard with all the handles. Now I'm just taking it straight to the cup. I'm not moon walking to get from point A to point B. I'm running from point A and through point B. You guys are going to hear what I'm saying. I'm going to be as transparent as I can be." He also spoke about Jerry Seinfeld's role on the album, saying: "He's the narrator. He's essentially like my conscience. You can look at him as kind of explaining what's happening if you get lost during the story. He'll come in and give you an update."

== Singles ==
"The Body" featuring Jeremih, was released as the album's lead single on September 9, 2014. On December 28, 2014, the music video was released for "The Body". "The Matrimony" featuring Usher, was released as the album's second single on March 2, 2015. The music video for "The Matrimony" premiered on June 8, 2015.

== Critical reception ==
Professional ratings
Aggregate scores
Source	Rating
Metacritic	67/100
Review scores
Source	Rating
AllMusic	3.5/5 stars
Billboard	3.5/5 stars
Complex	3.5/5 stars
Consequence of Sound	C
Exclaim!	8/10
HipHopDX	3/5 stars
Pitchfork	5.4/10
Rolling Stone	3.5/5 stars
XXL	4/5 (XL)

The Album About Nothing has received generally positive reviews from critics. At Metacritic, which assigns a normalized rating out of 100 to reviews from critics, the album received an average score of 67, which indicates "generally favorable reviews", based on 10 reviews.

Julian Kimble of Billboard said, "The Album About Nothing is his most personal piece of work to date, and also his best. That hair-trigger sensitivity can be off-putting, but it's also what makes him good at what he does. Wale will likely never find his sanity where he finds his glory, but he should at least find solace in knowing that, with all eyes on him, he delivered not only his strongest album, but the one which will define his career." Erin Lowers of Exclaim! wrote that the record is a "refreshing transparency of Wale's internal thoughts and future plans," further noting that "Wale's confidence shines through; rather than trying to live in his past or live up to his star-studded MMG cohorts, he's sincere and unapologetic here." Miranda J. of XXL gave the album an XL, saying "The Album About Nothing may be one of Wale’s best efforts to date. With mostly positive vibes built off a period negative experiences—Wale said in a 2015 interview he was depressed for much of the time he was crafting the album—it also causes one to wonder if Wale has to come into a new chapter along with the material. Seinfeld’s appearances are all appreciated and complement the material. Although there were some scepticism about the two joining together at first, after giving this album an invested living, it wouldn’t be a bad thing if Wale and Seinfeld were to hook up on a project once more."

Marcus Dowling of HipHopDX said, "On The Album About Nothing, Wale audaciously attempted to once again create poignant social commentary via combining his takes on his existence with those of Jerry Seinfeld doing the same. When Wale showcases his growth in being able to link his classic skillset with modern content, the album unequivocally succeeds. However, in attempting to placate current mainstream tastes, he falls short of the album being the unique and iconic success of the mixtape that truly launched his career to another level five years ago."

== Commercial performance ==
The Album About Nothing debuted at number one on the US Billboard 200 chart, earning 100,000 album-equivalent units, (including 88,000 copies in pure album sales) in its first week, according to Nielsen Music. This became Wale's second US number one debut on the chart. The album also accumulated a total of 6,888,472 on-demand streams of its songs. In its second week, the album dropped to number 11 on the chart, earning an additional 33,000 units. In its third week, the album dropped to number 21 on the chart, earning 20,000 more units. In its fourth week, the album dropped to number 32 on the chart, earning 15,000 units. As of May 2015, the album has sold 138,000 copies in the US. On April 1, 2025, the album was certified gold by the Recording Industry Association of America (RIAA) for combined sales and album-equivalent units of over 500,000 units in the United States.

== Track listing ==
The Album About Nothing track listing
No.	Title	Writer(s)	Producer(s)	Length
1.	"The Intro About Nothing"	Olubowale Akintimehin; Brittany Hazzard; Julian Gramma; Masamune Kudo	J Gramm; Rex Kudo	4:20
2.	"The Helium Balloon"	Akintimehin; Dacoury Natche; Adam Feeney; Sonny Uwaezouke	DJ Dahi; Sonny Digital; Frank Dukes^{[a]}	4:47
3.	"The White Shoes"	Akintimehin; Reese Cummings; Maurice Barnett-Fenderson; R.L. Altman III; Andwele Gardner; Titus Glover; Jason Powers; Emmanuel Riggins	Pro Reese	4:30
4.	"The Pessimist" (featuring J. Cole)	Akintimehin; Osinachi Nwaneri; Jermaine Cole	Nwaneri	4:32
5.	"The Middle Finger"	Akintimehin; Natche; Dave Bayley	DJ Dahi; Dave Glass Animals	4:00
6.	"The One Time in Houston"	Akintimehin; Cummings; Barnett-Fenderson; James Harris; Terry Lewis	Pro Reese	5:47
7.	"The Girls on Drugs"	Akintimehin; Harris; Lewis; Kevin Spencer; Janet Jackson	No Credit	4:09
8.	"The God Smile"	Akintimehin; Natche	DJ Dahi	5:16
9.	"The Need to Know" (featuring SZA)	Akintimehin; Hazzard; Gramma; Solana Rowe; Carvin Haggins; Robert Hebb; Taalib Johnson	J Gramm	3:36
10.	"The Success"	Akintimehin; Warren Lankford; Jacob Dutton; Samuel Barnes; Nasir Jones; Annie Lennox; Jean-Claude Olivier; David Stewart	Jake One	2:57
11.	"The Glass Egg"	Akintimehin; Alex Fonseca; Darryl Brown; Burt Bacharach; Hal David; Amel Larrieux; Bryce Wilson	Ayy Dot	4:47
12.	"The Bloom (AG3)"	Akintimehin; Roy Hammond; Stokley Williams; Julian Nixon; Craig Balmoris	Best Kept Secret; Williams^{[a]}	5:22
13.	"The Matrimony" (featuring Usher)	Akintimehin; Dutton; Marce Ayala; Kahlil Abdul-Rahman; Usher Raymond IV; Sam Dew	Jake One; DJ Khalil; Marcè Reazon	6:35
14.	"The Body" (featuring Jeremih)	Akintimehin; Cartier Grand; Jeremih Felton; Kenneth Coby; Robert Kelly	Soundz	3:52

Notes

- ^{^[a]} signifies an additional producer
- "The Intro About Nothing" contains additional vocals performed by Rex Kudo, Sabrina Sanchez, Idan Kalai, Stokley Williams and Tony Williams
- "The Helium Balloon" contains additional vocals performed by Magazeen
- "The White Shoes" contains additional vocals performed by Dwele
- "The One Time In Houston" contains additional vocals performed by Phil Ade
- "The Glass Egg" contains additional vocals performed by Chrisette Michele
- "The Bloom (AG3)" contains additional vocals performed by Stokley Williams

== Personnel ==
- Art direction and design: Mike Bully (Good Bully, LLC)
- Packaging production: Michelle Piza

== Charts ==
=== Weekly charts ===
Weekly chart performance for The Album About Nothing
Chart (2015)	Peak position
US Billboard 200	1
US Top R&B/Hip-Hop Albums (Billboard)	1
US Top Rap Albums (Billboard)	1

=== Year-end charts ===
2015 year-end chart performance for The Album About Nothing
Chart (2015)	Position
US Billboard 200	127
US Top R&B/Hip-Hop Albums (Billboard)	19

== Certifications ==
Region	Certification	Certified units/sales
United States (RIAA)	Gold	500,000^{‡}
^{‡} Sales+streaming figures based on certification alone.

== Release history ==
Release history and formats for The Album About Nothing
Region	Date	Format	Label	Ref.
United States	March 31, 2015	CD, digital download	Maybach, Atlantic	
