= Nic Nac =

American record producer and songwriter (born 1989)

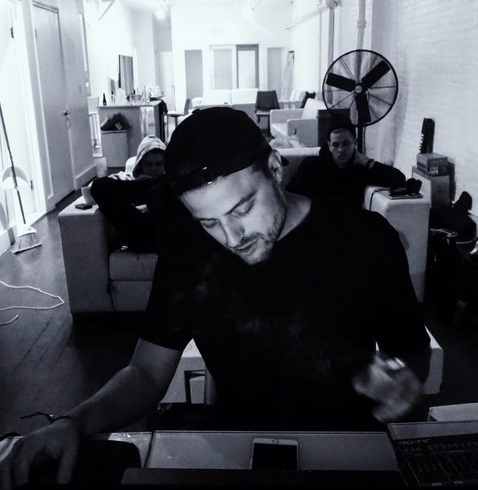
- Nic Nac in 2014

Background information
- Also known as: LetMeSeeYou
- Born: Nicholas Matthew Balding; July 5, 1989 (age 37); El Monte, California, U.S.
- Origin: El Cerrito, California, U.S.
- Genres: West Coast hip-hop; pop; R&B
- Occupations: Record producer; songwriter; audio engineer; rapper
- Instruments: FL Studio; guitar; piano; vocals
- Years active: 2003–present

Nicholas Matthew Balding (born July 5, 1989), known professionally as Nic Nac, is an American record producer from El Cerrito, California. He is known for producing several hit songs—mainly for hip hop and pop artists—in the mid-2010s, including "Loyal" for Chris Brown, "Do It Again" for Pia Mia, and DJ Khaled's "I'm the One" and "No Brainer". He began his career as part of the regional hip hop production group Go Dav in the early 2000s, and has since formed Starting Six.

His productions can be identified by the producer tag "Let Me See You!", a voice clip sampled from Wallpaper.'s 2013 song "Hesher". His musical style has been described as similar to fellow California-based producer Mustard, with whom he often collaborates.

== Early life ==
Nicholas Balding was born on July 5, 1989, in El Cerrito. He started to DJ when he was in fifth grade. His parents got him something called a "DJ In A Box" that came with two turntables, a mixer, and two speakers. He used basic drum beats and, at the time, did not know how to play piano. He started to DJ because he lived up the street from a Guitar Center and went there every day to hang around the people who worked there. They showed him how to DJ, so by the time he got to high school, he met someone in his class who made beats and he gave him a program. In 2003, when he was in the eighth grade, Balding and his cousin started a DJing group; they were DJing for their friends' parties, for school dances, and so on. He was playing songs by different rappers such as the Ying Yang Twins, E-40, Lil Jon, and Too $hort.

== Career ==
Balding got into production at the age of 14, during high school. He used Fruity Loops (now FL Studio). Later in high school, Balding formed a group with four rappers (Bobby Brackins, known at the time as Young Bob, Creole Kang, Suga Butta) and one singer (Justin Martin known as The Jynx), named Go Dav. Balding was the only member who did not hail from Oakland, California. They became known locally for their 2007 song "Ride or Die Chick".

In the late 2000s, he got together with some of his best friends at St Mary's High School in Berkeley, and started a similar group, who went by the name Starting Six.

His first major success as a producer was the 2010 single "143" by Bobby Brackins. His earnings from the song enabled him to relocate to Los Angeles. He hired a manager after moving to Los Angeles, though they later had a falling out.

After "143", the next hit he produced was the 2013 single "Beat It" by Sean Kingston, Chris Brown, and Wiz Khalifa. After producing the song, Balding's hired a new manager with a closer mutual connection to Brown. Later in 2013, he produced Brown's single "Loyal". Prior to its release, Balding's manager played the beat for Brown's manager, and Brown took the beat for his own the same day. He cut the track that night and enlisted Lil Wayne, French Montana, and Too Short to record verses within a week. In 2015, he then produced Chris Brown and Tyga's single "Ayo". Balding delivered, his production replete with an echoing "I neeeed you" helium vocal sample.

== Production style ==
Nic Nac describes his melodies as "video gamey", with heavy R&B chords underneath. He frequently uses a voice loop in his productions: "Let me see you!", which is heard prominently in perhaps his most famous production, Chris Brown's 2013 single "Loyal".

== Personal life ==
In 2014, he started dating singer Pia Mia.

== Production discography ==
Does not include remixes or other producers
Year	Song	Artist(s)	Album
2007	"Demo On Wax"	Team Knoc	The Makeover
2010	"Rocket"	Yuna	Decorate
2010	"Random Awesome"	Yuna	Decorate
2010	"I'm Ready"	Bobby Brackins, Marc E. Bassy	Live Good 0.5
2010	"143"	Bobby Brackins, Ray J	Live Good 0.5
2010	"Nightime"	YMTK aka Young Murph	Nightime Sunshine
2010	"Sunshine"	YMTK aka Young Murph	Nightime Sunshine
2010	"Introduction Day"	YMTK aka Young Murph	Nightime Sunshine
2010	"Game Time"	YMTK aka Young Murph	Nightime Sunshine
2010	"Leader"	YMTK aka Young Murph	Nightime Sunshine
2010	"El Aye"	YMTK aka Young Murph	Nightime Sunshine
2010	"Put It In the Sky	YMTK aka Young Murph	Nightime Sunshine
2010	"Feel Good"	YMTK aka Young Murph	Nightime Sunshine
2010	"Be Girl (Remix)"	YMTK aka Young Murph	Nightime Sunshine
2010	"Lights Out"	YMTK aka Young Murph	Nightime Sunshine
2010	"Dare Me"	YMTK aka Young Murph	Nightime Sunshine
2010	"Carpool"	YMTK aka Young Murph	Nightime Sunshine
2010	"Nightime 2.0"	YMTK aka Young Murph	Nightime Sunshine
2010	"Little Devil"	Campa	—N/a
2011	"180"	Bobby Brackins, Jeremih	—N/a
2011	"Bout That Life"	Mann	—N/a
2012	"Chainless"	Tinashe	In Case We Die
2012	"Young Booty"	Bobby Brackins	Stay On It
2012	"B.Y.O.B."	Bobby Brackins, Wallpaper	Stay On It
2012	"Yanking"	Bobby Brackins	Stay On It
2012	"Breeder"	Bobby Brackins, Starting Six	Stay On It
2012	"Like Me Revemped"	Bobby Brackins, Nic Nac	Stay On It
2012	"S.O.D"	Starting Six, Aliky	On Yo Beach
2013	"I Hit It First"	Ray J, Bobby Brackins	—N/a
2013	"Open Yo Legs"	Bobby Brackins	Maxwell Park
2013	"Big Body"	Bobby Brackins, Clyde Carson, Ty Dolla $ign	Maxwell Park
2013	"Jungle Fever"	Bobby Brackins	Maxwell Park
2013	"Kindergarten"	Bobby Brackins	Maxwell Park
2013	"Rari"	Bobby Brackins, Ray J	Maxwell Park
2013	"Westside"	Bobby Brackins, Marc E. Bassy	Maxwell Park
2013	"Beat It"	Sean Kingston, Chris Brown, Wiz Khalifa	Back 2 Life
2013	"Hold That"	Sean Kingston, Yo Gotti	Back 2 Life
2013	"Seasonal Love"	Sean Kingston, Wale	Back 2 Life
2013	"Shotta Luv"	Sean Kingston, 2 Chainz	Back 2 Life
2013	"Ayo (16th Floor)"	Sean Kingston	Back 2 Life
2013	"Save One For Me"	Sean Kingston	Back 2 Life
2013	"My Baby"	Zendaya	Zendaya
2013	"Wake Up In It"	Mally Mall, Sean Kingston, Tyga, French Montana, Pusha T	Well Done IV
2013	"GLOBE"	YMTK, Bread	MPL 2: Murphy Pan's Labyrinth
2013	"Hotel Party"	YMTK, The Six	MPL 2: Murphy Pan's Labyrinth
2014	"Dolo"	Kid Ink, R. Kelly	Full Speed
2014	"Fucking Around"	100s	Ivry
2014	"Nothing"	Ma$e, Eric Bellinger	Now We Even
2014	"2 Blessed"	Roach Gigz	Roachy Balboa Round 4
2014	"Loyal"	Chris Brown, Lil Wayne, Tyga	X
2014	"Came To Do"	Chris Brown, Akon	X
2014	"Fill Me In"	Pia Mia, Austin Mahone	TBA
2014	"Fuck With You"	Pia Mia	TBA
2014	"Watch Me Work"	Tinashe	Aquarius
2014	"I Don't Get Tired"	Kevin Gates, August Alsina	Luca Brasi 2
2014	"Say What"	Ernest Rush	STRT TRBL
2015	"Dolo"	Kid Ink, R. Kelly	Full Speed
2015	"Ayo"	Chris Brown, Tyga	Fan of a Fan: The Album
2015	"Bitches N Marijuana"	Chris Brown, Tyga, Schoolboy Q	Fan of a Fan: The Album
2015	"I'm Up"	Omarion, French Montana, Kid Ink	I'm Up – Single
2015	"Do It Again"	Pia Mia featuring Chris Brown and Tyga	Do It Again – Single
2016	"Faithful"	Bobby Brackins, Ty Dolla Sign	To Live For
2016	"Back to the Crib"	Bobby Brackins, Wash	To Live For
2016	"Joy Ride"	Bobby Brackins, Austin Mahone	To Live For
2017	"I'm the One"	DJ Khaled featuring Justin Bieber, Quavo, Chance the Rapper and Lil Wayne	Grateful
2018	"No Brainer"	DJ Khaled featuring Justin Bieber, Quavo, and Chance the Rapper	Father of Asahd
2019	"All I Do Is Cry"	Kim Petras	Clarity
