= Loyal (Chris Brown song) =

2014 single by Chris Brown

- Cover artwork for the album version

Single by Chris Brown featuring Lil Wayne and Too Short or French Montana or Tyga

from the album X
- Released: December 19, 2013 (East and West Coast versions); March 24, 2014 (album version)
- Recorded: 2013
- Studio: Glenwood Place (Burbank, California)
- Genre: Hip hop; R&B; pop
- Length: 4:24 (West Coast, East Coast, and album versions); 6:02 (extended remix)
- Label: RCA
- Songwriters: Christopher Brown; Tyrone Griffin, Jr.; Nicholas Balding; Mark Kragen; Bobby Brackins; Dwayne Carter; Karim Kharbouch; Stanley Cox; Omololu Akinlolu; Mason Betha; Sean Combs; Christopher Wallace; Todd Shaw; Asha Puthli; Deric Angelettie; Michael Stevenson; Jermaine Mauldin; Shawn Carter
- Lyricists: Brown; D. Carter Jr.; Brackins; Griffin, Jr.; Stevenson (album version); Kharbouch (East Coast version); Shaw (West Coast version)
- Producers: Nic Nac; Kragen

Chris Brown singles chronology
| "Show Me" (2013) | "Loyal" (2013) | "Main Chick" (2014) |

Lil Wayne singles chronology
| "Thank You" (2013) | "Loyal" (2013) | "We Alright" (2014) |

Too Short singles chronology
| "Girls" (2013) | "Loyal" (2013) | "Or Nah" (2014) |

French Montana singles chronology
| "Feelin' Myself" (2013) | "Loyal" (2013) | "I Luh Ya Papi" (2014) |

Tyga singles chronology
| "Iz U Down" (2013) | "Loyal" (2014) | "Hookah" (2014) |

Music video
- "Loyal" on YouTube

"Loyal" is a song by American singer Chris Brown, released as the fourth single from his sixth studio album X (2014). Produced by Nic Nac and Mark Kragen, the song features American rapper Lil Wayne and another American rapper, varying by version: Tyga on the album version, French Montana on the East Coast version, and Too $hort on the West Coast version. The song was written by Brown, Wayne, Bobby Brackins, Ty Dolla $ign, and the producers, as well as different interpolative-credited artists, varying for each respective version.

"Loyal" received praise from critics, that commended its musicality and unapologetic lyrical content. The song became the highest charting song off the X album, peaking at number nine on the US Billboard Hot 100. It stayed on the chart for 36 weeks. Among the certifications it gained, it was most notably certified 8× Platinum by the Recording Industry Association of America (RIAA), 3× Platinum by the Australian Recording Industry Association (ARIA), and 2× Platinum by the British Phonographic Industry (BPI). The song was promoted with performances by Brown and Lil Wayne at the BET Awards 2014, Summer Jam, 2014 Soul Train Music Awards, and The Tonight Show Starring Jimmy Fallon.

== Background and theme ==
Producer Nic Nac and American R&B singer Ty Dolla $ign, started the work of the song, creating the beat and a first version of the hook. Nic Nac's manager played that unfinished demo for Chris Brown's manager, then Brown heard it and decided to create a song from it. Talking about the making of "Loyal", Brown said: “Nic Nac and Ty Dolla Sign came with a couple concepts for it, and wrote the pre-demo before I finished the record off”.

On December 16, 2013, the audio to the song was premiered online. The song was originally released in two versions, an East Coast version and a West Coast version. Both versions feature Chris Brown and Lil Wayne; the East Coast version also features French Montana, while the West Coast version features Too Short. Then on December 19, both versions of the song were officially released as digital downloads. On March 24, 2014, the album version of "Loyal" was released, featuring Lil Wayne and Tyga, as the fourth single from his sixth studio album X. "Loyal" contains an interpolation of "Money Ain't a Thang" (1998), performed by Jay-Z featuring Jermaine Dupri, for which its composers are credited as writers. It also contains an interpolation of "Shine" (2000), by Lil Wayne.

The overall theme of the song is unfaithful women. In a 2014 interview with Ebro Darden, Chris Brown described the song as following the steps of hip hop tracks like 'All About U' (1996) by Tupac Shakur and Nate Dogg, which depict experiences with groupies who follow celebrities for opportunistic reasons.

== Composition ==
The song is composed in the key of F-sharp major in a common time, and has a tempo of 99 beats per minute.

== Critical reception ==
The song was met with positive reviews. Brad Wete of Billboard praised the track for its "anthemic" hook, and "playful" instrumental. The Guardian said that "Loyal" exemplifies how "Brown’s amorality, trust issues and joyless acquisitiveness have occasionally made for unwittingly spellbinding songs". Vice's writer Slava Pastuk defined "Loyal" as "the perfect song", saying that "the beauty of this song" is that "it's evil as s**t, but you can't help but like it anyway. Just like Chris Brown", stating that it "could only be made by someone who is so deeply imperfect, that you take everything he's saying to heart", adding that "if you look past the glossy veneer of misandry [sic], you see that the song acts as a cautionary tale for men who are foolish enough to try to pursue the same women that will run into Chris Brown at some point in their lives".

HotNewHipHop called the track a "worthy addition to the impressive body of work Chris Brown has been developing over the years". Complex defined “Loyal” a "catchy" track "drenched in ego and materialism". HipHopDX found Nic Nac's production on the song to be similar to DJ Mustard's production style. XXL called it a "record-breaking" song, finding it to be an "up-tempo" and "dance driven record". The Los Angeles Times affirmed that on the song Brown "pairs his coarsest, most mean-spirited thoughts", praising "Loyal" for its "sleekest, most irresistible beats". Stereogum, while reviewing Brown's X album, highlighted the song, saying that "the glaringly hypocritical yet musically brilliant “Loyal” still makes me feel terrible for losing myself in its playful neon twirls".

== Music video ==
In February 2014, the music video for the album version, directed by Chris Brown, was shot at Universal City Walk with Lil Wayne and Tyga. The clip was recorded while Brown was in a rehab facility, with the singer being allowed to leave from 11 a.m. to 11 p.m. to film the video. On March 21, 2014, Brown announced that the music video would be released on March 24, 2014. Then as planned, the music video for the album version of the song was released that day. Singer Ty Dolla $ign, who co-wrote the song, as well as fellow singers Usher and Trey Songz made cameo appearances in the video. On August 25, 2020, the video passed one billion views on YouTube, becoming Brown's first music video to do so.

== Live performances ==
Lil Wayne sang the song with Drake at Summer Jam 2014. Brown, as well as Wayne and Tyga performed it live at the BET Awards 2014.

== Remixes ==
On January 8, 2014, Keyshia Cole released a remix of the song also featuring Sean Kingston, leaving Lil Wayne's original vocals on it. On the same day, Tyga previewed his verse that he recorded for the official remix of the song, that ended up being the album version. Then on March 24, 2014, the version featuring Tyga and Lil Wayne was released to mainstream urban radio in the United States. A release for digital download followed two days later. American singer Mila J and British R&B singer Craig David also released their own respective remix versions of the song.

== Chart performance ==
Loyal debuted at number 82 on the US Billboard Hot 100 chart on the week of February 1, 2014. It eventually made its way to the top-ten, peaking at number nine, becoming Brown's 10th top-ten single on the chart. The song spent a total of 36 weeks on the chart. It also peaked at number four on the US Hot R&B/Hip-Hop Songs chart and spent 14 weeks on the chart. As of July 2014, the song has sold a million digital copies in the United States. In 2023, the single was certified 6× Platinum by the Recording Industry Association of America (RIAA) for combined sales and streaming equivalent units of over six million units in the United States.

== Track listing ==
Digital single

1. "Loyal" (East Coast Version) (featuring Lil Wayne and French Montana) – 4:24
2. "Loyal" (West Coast Version) (featuring Lil Wayne and Too Short) – 4:24
3. "Loyal" (Album Version) (featuring Lil Wayne and Tyga) – 4:24

== Charts ==
=== Weekly charts ===
Weekly chart performance for "Loyal"
| Chart (2014) | Peak position |
|---|---|
| Australia (ARIA) | 42 |
| Australia Urban (ARIA) | 5 |
| Austria (Ö3 Austria Top 40) | 61 |
| Belgium (Ultratop 50 Flanders) | 37 |
| Belgium Urban (Ultratop Flanders) | 6 |
| Belgium (Ultratop 50 Wallonia) | 49 |
| Canada Hot 100 (Billboard) | 71 |
| Euro Digital Song Sales (Billboard) | 18 |
| France (SNEP) | 35 |
| Germany (GfK) | 54 |
| Ireland (IRMA) | 49 |
| Japan Hot 100 (Billboard) | 47 |
| Netherlands (Single Top 100) | 98 |
| New Zealand (Recorded Music NZ) | 19 |
| Scottish Singles Sales (Official Charts) | 19 |
| South Africa Airplay (EMA) | 4 |
| UK Singles (Official Charts) | 10 |
| UK Hip Hop/R&B (Official Charts) | 1 |
| US Billboard Hot 100 | 9 |
| US Hot R&B/Hip-Hop Songs (Billboard) | 4 |
| US R&B/Hip-Hop Airplay (Billboard) | 1 |
| US Pop Airplay (Billboard) | 39 |
| US Rhythmic Airplay (Billboard) | 1 |

=== Year-end charts ===
2014 year-end chart performance for "Loyal"
| Chart (2014) | Position |
|---|---|
| France (SNEP) | 116 |
| UK Singles (OCC) | 41 |
| US Billboard Hot 100 | 30 |
| US Hot R&B/Hip-Hop Songs (Billboard) | 10 |
| US Hot R&B/Hip-Hop Airplay (Billboard) | 1 |
| US Rhythmic (Billboard) | 6 |

== Certifications ==
Certifications for "Loyal"
| Region | Certification | Certified units/sales |
|---|---|---|
| Australia (ARIA) | 3× Platinum | 210,000^{‡} |
| Denmark (IFPI Danmark) | Platinum | 90,000^{‡} |
| Germany (BVMI) | Platinum | 300,000^{‡} |
| New Zealand (RMNZ) | 5× Platinum | 150,000^{‡} |
| United Kingdom (BPI) | 3× Platinum | 1,800,000^{‡} |
| United States (RIAA) | 8× Platinum | 8,000,000^{‡} |
^{‡} Sales+streaming figures based on certification alone.

== Radio and release history ==
| Country | Date | Format | Label | Ref. |
|---|---|---|---|---|
| United States | December 19, 2013 | Digital download for East and West Coast version | RCA | |
| United States | January 15, 2014 | Mainstream urban radio | RCA | |
| United States | March 26, 2014 | Digital download for album version | RCA | |
| United Kingdom | April 3, 2014 | Urban contemporary radio | RCA | |
