= ARIA Urban Singles Chart =

Music ranking

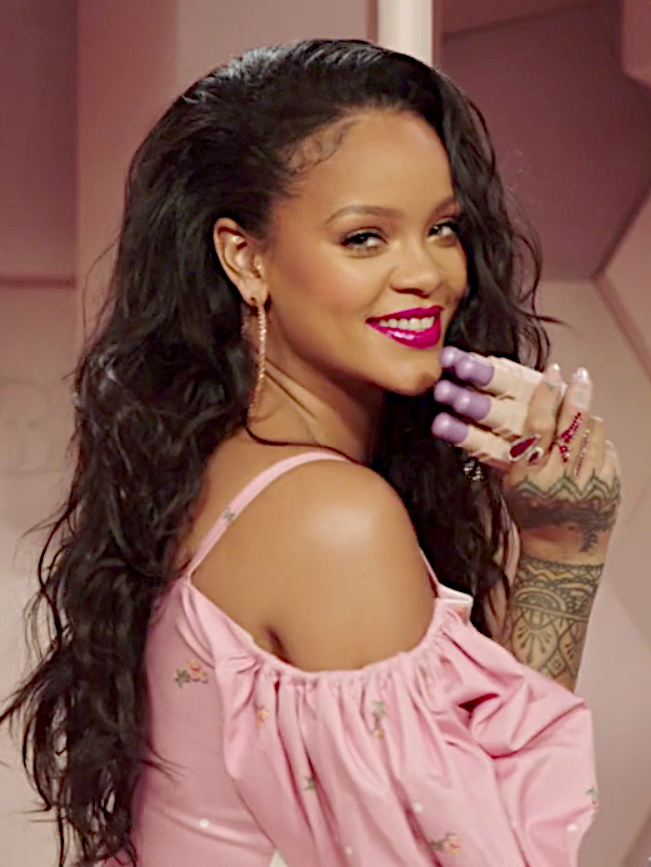
Rihanna holds the record for the most number ones and weeks at number one on the chart

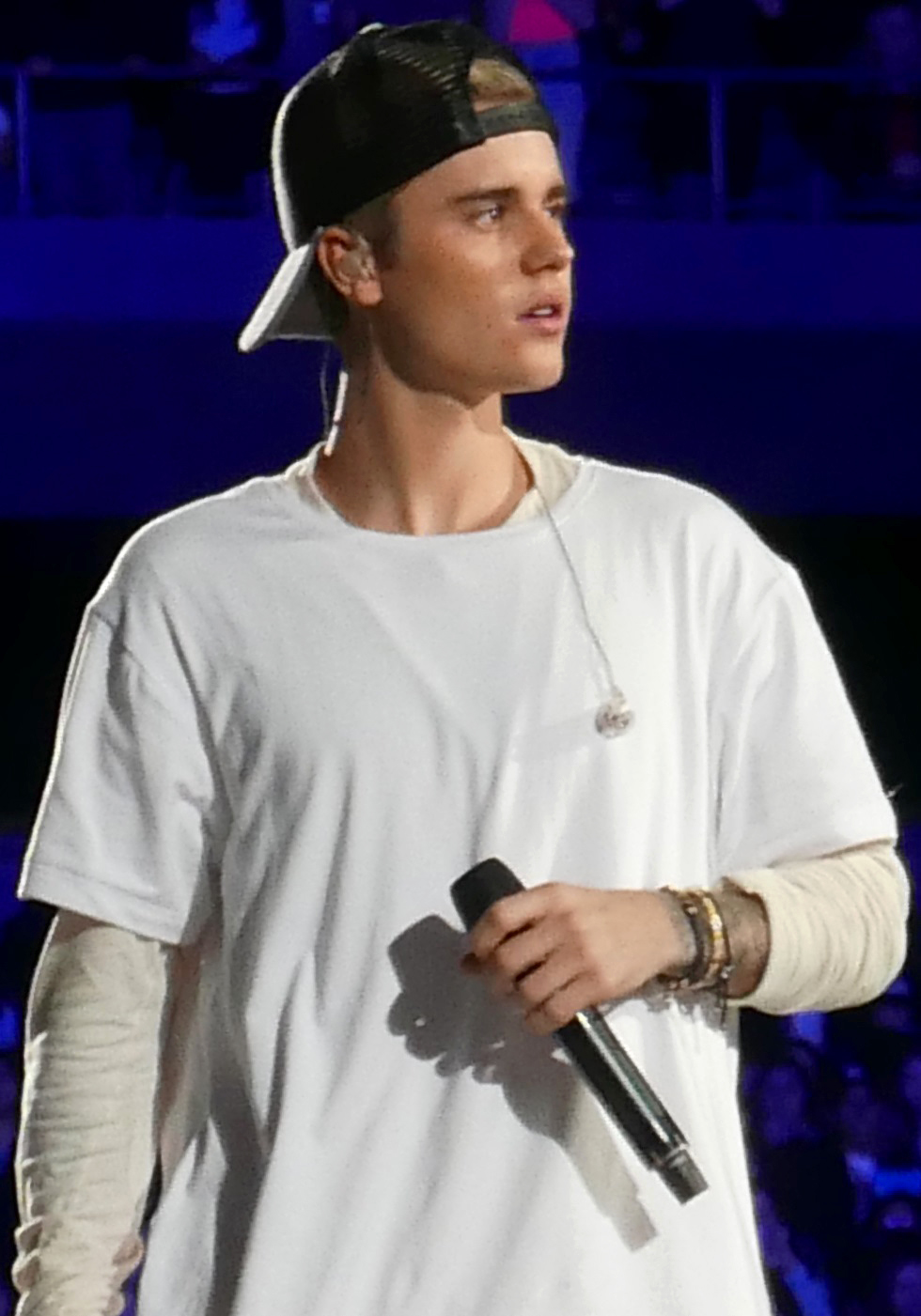
Kid Laroi and Justin Bieber spend the most weeks at number one with one track with "Stay"

The ARIA Hip Hop/R&B Singles Chart, formerly the ARIA Urban Singles Chart, ranks the best performing hip hop and R&B tracks within Australia and is provided by the Australian Recording Industry Association.

== History ==
The ARIA Hip Hop/R&B Singles Chart was established as the Urban Singles Chart in 2001 and first published on 1 January of that year. The chart still runs weekly as of 23 November 2026 The Current number one is "Love Me Not" by Ravyn Lenae .

== Trivia ==
=== Songs with the most weeks at number one ===
38 weeks

- The Kid Laroi and Justin Bieber – "Stay" (2021–2022)

31 Weeks

- Ravyn Lenae – "Love Me Not" (2025–2026)

23 weeks

- The Weeknd – "Starboy" (2016–2017)

22 weeks

- Lil Nas X – "Old Town Road" (2019)

20 weeks

- Post Malone and Swae Lee – "Sunflower" (2018–2019)
- Malcolm Todd – "Earrings" (2026)

19 weeks

- The Weeknd – "Blinding Lights" (2020)
- Raye – "Where Is My Husband!" (2025–2026)

17 weeks

- LMFAO featuring Lauren Bennett and GoonRock – "Party Rock Anthem" (2011)
- Macklemore and Ryan Lewis featuring Eric Nally, Melle Mel, Kool Moe Dee and Grandmaster Caz – "Downtown" (2015–2016)
- Jack Harlow – "Lovin on Me" (2023–2024)

=== Artists with the most number ones ===
This list includes main artists and featured artists.

- Rihanna (15)
- Eminem (13)
- Drake (10)
- The Black Eyed Peas (8)
- Flo Rida (8)
- Jason Derulo (6)
- Nelly (6)
- Post Malone (6)
- Lil Wayne (5)
- Beyoncé (5)

=== Cumulative weeks at number one ===
- Rihanna (97)
- Eminem (71)
- The Weeknd (63)
- Post Malone (55)
- Flo Rida (50)
- The Kid Laroi (50)
- Justin Bieber (48)
- Drake (48)
- The Black Eyed Peas (42)
- Jack Harlow (32)

== See also ==
- ARIA Charts
