= Nick Barat =

Nick Catchdubs
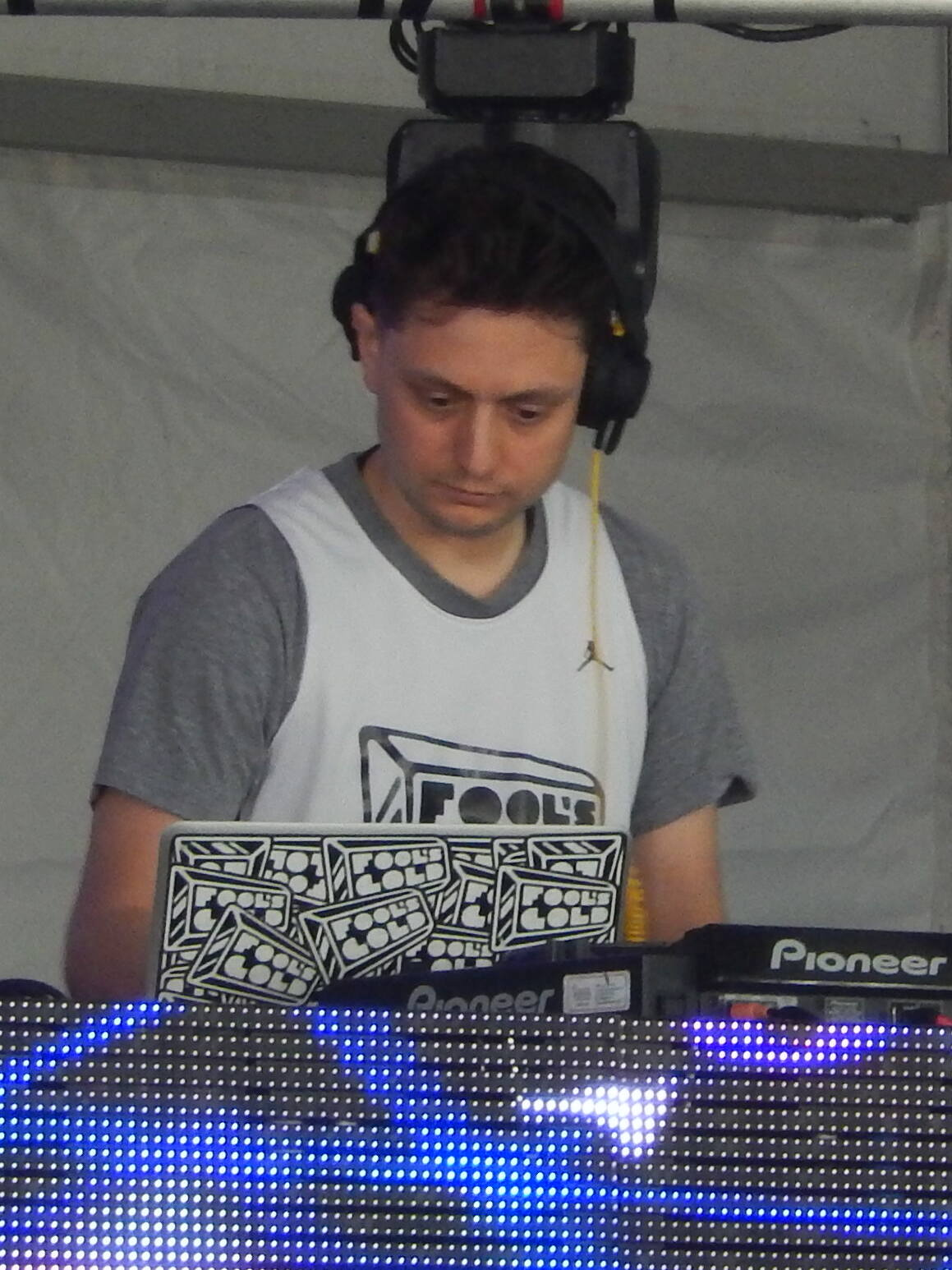
- Barat at the 2014 Spring Awakening Music Festival

Background information
- Born: Nick Barat; January 25, 1981 (age 45)
- Origin: New Jersey, U.S.
- Genres: Hip-hop; electronic
- Occupations: Record producer; DJ
- Years active: 2004–present
- Label: Fool's Gold
- Website: www.catchdubs.com

Nick Barat (born January 25, 1981), better known by his stage name Nick Catchdubs, is an American record producer and DJ from New Jersey. He is a co-founder of Fool's Gold Records. He has also served as an associate editor at The Fader. In 2013, Stereogum called him "the best party DJ in the game right now." He resides in Brooklyn, New York.

== Career ==
In 2012, Barat released After Hours, a collaborative mixtape with rapper Jackie Chain. It was chosen by Stereogum as their Mixtape of the Week. In that year, he performed live with Danny Brown at the MoMA PS1's Warm Up. In 2013, he released his first single, "Bizness", which featured vocal contributions from Iamsu! and Jay Ant. In 2014, he released "Wuts That", a single which featured rapper B.I.C. In 2015, he released his first studio album, Smoke Machine. It featured guest appearances from the likes of Troy Ave, Heems, Iamsu!, and Jay Ant. Consequence of Sound gave the album a grade of B−, calling it "a damn good record to spin at a party this summer." In 2019, he released a studio album, UFO.

== Discography ==
=== Studio albums ===
- Smoke Machine (2015)
- UFO (2019)

=== Compilation albums ===
- UFO RMX (2019)

=== Mixtapes ===
- After Hours (2012) (with Jackie Chain)

=== EPs ===
- More Smoke (2015)
- ATM (2019)
- Pour Decisions (2020) (with Vincent the Owl)
- Gutter (2022) (with Vincent the Owl)
- 100 Proof (2024) (with Vincent the Owl)

=== Singles ===
- "Wuts That" (2013)
- "Bizness" (2014)
- "Dip Dip" (2017)
- "UFO Style" (2018)
- "All Night" (2018)
- "Pick Up Yaself" (2018)

=== DJ mixes ===
- Wale - 100 Miles & Running (2007)
- Wale - The Mixtape About Nothing (2008)
- Izza Kizza - Kizzaland (2008)
- Izza Kizza - The Wizard of Iz (2009)
- Wale & 9th Wonder - Back to the Feature (2009)
- Kid Sister - Kiss Kiss Kiss (2011)
