= Blue Island (album) =

Studio album by Ravyn Lenae
- Released: August 7, 2026
- Recorded: 2024–2026
- Studios: Glenwood Place (Burbank); NoFreeBeats; Jungle City (New York City); Swamp; EastWest (Burbank)
- Genres: Pop; R&B; rock
- Length: 48:43
- Label: Atlantic
- Producers: Alissia; Craig Balmoris; Ryan James Carr; Dahi; Ely Rise; Flanafi; Lucian Gray; Saya Gray; John Hill; Tyler Johnson; Ian Kirkpatrick; Danny McKinnon; Julian Nixon; No I.D.; Rascal; Karriem Riggins; Jonah Stevens

Ravyn Lenae chronology
Bird's Eye (2024)	Blue Island (2026)

Singles from Blue Island
- 1. "Reputation" / "Bobby" Released: April 3, 2026; 2. "Handle" Released: May 28, 2026; 3. "Saturday Night" Released: June 26, 2026

Blue Island is the third studio album by the American singer and songwriter Ravyn Lenae. It was released on August 7, 2026, through Atlantic Records. It serves as the follow-up to her second studio album, Bird's Eye (2024).

The album was preceded by the dual lead singles "Reputation", featuring Dominic Fike, and "Bobby", both released on April 3, 2026. "Handle", was released as the second single on May 28, 2026, and "Saturday Night" was released as the third single on June 26, 2026.

== Background and promotion ==
Following the release of her second album and commercial breakthrough Bird's Eye in August 2024, Lenae achieved her biggest hit to date with "Love Me Not" the following year, as well as collaborations with American and Colombian singer-songwriter Kali Uchis and British singer-songwriter PinkPantheress. Additionally, she spent much of 2025 on tour with Sabrina Carpenter and Reneé Rapp. In an interview with Paper in August 2025, Lenae first discussed working on new music, stating that she aspired for her next era "to feel limitless and free". She described the creative process as "jumping over hills", expressing excitement about the collaborators she would work with and the artist she could potentially grow into.

Lenae released her first solo material since 2024 on April 3, 2026, with the dual lead singles "Reputation" (featuring American singer-songwriter Dominic Fike) and "Bobby". On May 28, 2026, Lenae announced the album, scheduled for release on August 7, 2026, alongside the release of its second single, "Handle". Blue Island is described as an "immersive world shaped by poise, playfulness, and quiet confidence". It was executive-produced by American producer DJ Dahi, whom Lenae had previously described as an "ideal creative partner", particularly for their shared distaste for "genre tropes and boundaries". For Lenae, the album represents a "point of arrival" in her identity, free from any "preconceived notions about Blackness" or expectations of who she was supposed to be in the past. She felt it was the right moment to challenge ideas of R&B and pop, disregard outside expectations, and create music in her own style. In support of the album, Lenae is scheduled to headline several European festivals in August 2026.

== Critical reception ==
Professional ratings
Aggregate scores
Source	Rating
AnyDecentMusic?	7.5/10
Metacritic	79/100
Review scores
Source	Rating
AllMusic	4/5 stars in a 0–5 star scale
Clash	8/10
Exclaim!	7/10
The Guardian	4/5 stars in a 0–5 star scale
The Line of Best Fit	7/10
NME	4.5/5 stars in a 0–5 star scale
Paste	B
Pitchfork	7.1/10
Rolling Stone	4/5 stars in a 0–5 star scale
Slant Magazine	2.5/5 stars in a 0–5 star scale

Any Decent Music gave the album a weighted average score of 7.5 out of 10 from eleven critic scores. According to Metacritic, it received "generally favorable" reviews based on a weighted average score of 79 out of 100 from ten critic scores.

== Track listing ==
Blue Island track listing
No.	Title	Writer(s)	Producer(s)	Length
1.	"Handle"	Ravyn Lenae; Dacoury Dahi Natche; Simón Martínez; Eric Leva; Spencer Stewart; Mikky Ekko; Ely Weisfeld	Dahi; Flanafi; Jonah Stevens^{[a]}	3:06
2.	"Familiar Dreams"	Lenae; Natche; Craig Balmoris; Julian Nixon; Tayla Parx; Leva; John Hill; Daniel McKinnon	Dahi; Balmoris; Nixon; Hill; Ryan James Carr^{[a]}; McKinnon^{[a]}	2:53
3.	"Never Let Me Go"	Lenae; Natche; Tobias Breuer; Weisfeld; Leva; Lily Kaplan; Marvin Yancy; Charles Jackson	Dahi; Rascal; Ely Rise	3:11
4.	"In & Out"	Lenae; Natche; Jonah Stevens; Weisfeld; Leva; Parx	Dahi; Stevens; Ely Rise	3:20
5.	"Potential"	Lenae; Natche; Martínez; Ahmanti Booker; Leva; Kaplan	Dahi; Flanafi; Monte Booker^{[a]}; DJ Manny^{[a]}	3:24
6.	"Sew Me Back Together"	Lenae; Natche; Ian Kirkpatrick; Weisfeld; Leva	Dahi; Kirkpatrick; Ely Rise; Stewart^{[a]}; Karriem Riggins^{[a]}	3:17
7.	"Reputation" (featuring Dominic Fike)	Lenae; Natche; Sarah Aarons; Stewart; Dominic Fike; Devin Workman; Weisfeld	Dahi; Ely Rise; Tyler Johnson^{[a]}; Flanafi^{[a]}; Workman^{[a]}	3:55
8.	"Saturday Night"	Lenae; Natche; Alissia Benveniste; Weisfeld; Parx; Leva; McKinnon	Dahi; Alissia; Ely Rise; Johnson^{[a]}; Flanafi^{[a]}; Workman^{[a]}	3:37
9.	"Babygirl" (featuring Doechii)	Lenae; Natche; Weisfeld; Benveniste; Karriem Riggins; Parx; Leva; Jaylah Hickmon	Dahi; Ely Rise; Alissia; Riggins; Flanafi^{[a]}; McKinnon^{[a]}	3:43
10.	"Barriers"	Lenae; Natche; Weisfeld; James Harmon Stack; McKinnon; Leva	Dahi; Ely Rise; McKinnon	4:09
11.	"Wish You Well"	Lenae; Natche; Martínez; Weisfeld; Diana Gordon; Justin Tranter; Leva	Dahi; Flanafi; Ely Rise	3:30
12.	"Bobby"	Lenae; Natche; Saya Gray; Lucian Gray; Leva; John Mavro	Dahi; S. Gray; L. Gray; Carr^{[a]}	3:31
13.	"Find It One Day"	Lenae; Ernest Dion Wilson; Marcus Semaj; Leva; Weisfeld; Natche; Andrew Aged	Flanafi; Carr; Dahi; Ely Rise; No I.D.	4:05
14.	"Let Us In"	Lenae; Natche; Weisfeld; Tyler Johnson; Leva; Ilsey Juber; Veronika Wyman	Dahi; Ely Rise; Johnson; Flanafi^{[a]}	3:02
Total length:				48:43

=== Notes ===
- ^{^[a]} signifies an additional producer
- "Never Let Me Go" contains elements from "Love of You", written by Marvin Yancy and Charles Jackson, and performed by Jackson.

== Personnel ==
These credits are adapted from the album's liner notes and Tidal.

=== Musicians ===
- Ravyn Lenae – vocals (all tracks), background vocals (track 2), vocal arrangement (7, 12)
- Ely Rise – keyboards (1, 3, 4, 6–11, 13, 14)
- Dahi – bass (1, 4, 6, 7, 10, 11, 13, 14), keyboards (1, 5, 8, 9, 13), drum programming (1), programming (3, 5, 9), drums (4–6, 8, 10, 11, 13), guitar (6, 10), background vocals (7, 14), Moog (7), synthesizers (12)
- Jonah Stevens – synthesizers (1), guitar (4)
- Flanafi – guitar (1, 5, 7, 9, 11, 13, 14), bass (5), keyboards (7)
- Danny McKinnon – guitar (2, 8–10, 12), bass (2, 12)
- Denise Stoudmire – background vocals (2, 4, 10, 13)
- Olivia Walker – background vocals (2, 4, 10, 13)
- Marcus Neither – background vocals (2, 4, 10, 13)
- Eric Leva – background vocals (2, 9, 10), vocal arrangement (7, 12)
- Tayla Parx – background vocals (2, 9)
- Ryan James Carr – drums (2, 12, 13), percussion (8, 12), sound design (13)
- Craig Balmoris – synthesizer, keyboards (2)
- Julian Nixon – synthesizer, keyboards (2)
- John Hill – drums (2)
- Rascal – programming (3)
- Amalia Williams – background vocals (3)
- Richard Williams – background vocals (3)
- Monte Booker – drums, programming (5)
- DJ Manny – MIDI notes (5)
- Spencer Stewart – bass, guitar (6); string arrangement (7)
- Karriem Riggins – drum break (6, 9)
- Ian Kirkpatrick – drums, vocal chops (6)
- Tyler Johnson – keyboards (7), drums (14)
- Dominic Fike – guitars, vocals (7)
- Alissia Benveniste – synthesizers (8, 9), bass (9)
- Doechii – vocals (9)
- Saya Gray – guitar (12)
- Lucian Gray – synthesizers (12)
- Veronika Wyman – background vocals (14)

=== Technical and creative ===
- Bryan Schwaller – engineering (all tracks), vocal production (2–6, 8–14)
- Veronika Wyman – engineering (all tracks), vocal production (14)
- Caleb Laven – engineering (1–3), vocal production (1, 3), additional vocal production (2)
- Jayda Love – engineering (9)
- Owen Stoutt – engineering (13, 14)
- Daniel Escobar – engineering assistance
- Kyle McAulay – engineering assistance (1–9, 11, 12, 14)
- Zane Lehmann – engineering assistance (10, 13)
- Ravyn Lenae – vocal production (2–6, 8–14), additional vocal production (1)
- Eric Leva – vocal production (2–6, 8–14), additional vocal production (1)
- Dahi – vocal production (2, 4, 8, 10, 13, 14), additional vocal production (1), executive production
- Tayla Parx – vocal production (9)
- Doechii – vocal production (9)
- David Wrench – mixing
- Dale Becker – mastering
- Katie Harvey – mastering assistance
- Adam Burt – mastering assistance
- Noah McCorkle – mastering assistance
- Violeta Boix – creative production
- Alex "Figs" Figueroa – creative production
- Isha Dipika Walia – creative direction, graphic design, logo design
- Drew Jarrett – photography
- Metals – graphic design
- Hayley Morris – logo design

== Charts ==
Chart performance
Chart (2026)	Peak position
Australian Albums (ARIA)	95
Australian Hip Hop/R&B Albums (ARIA)	18
Hungarian Physical Albums (MAHASZ)	23
