= Best Kept Secret (production team) =

American music production duo

- Origin: Washington, D.C., United States
- Genres: Hip hop; go-go; dance; pop; R&B
- Years active: 2007–present
- Members: Julian Nixon; Craig Balmoris
- Past members: Ernest "Tone P" Price

Best Kept Secret is an American music production duo, composed of record producers Julian Nixon and Craig Balmoris. The duo met in 2006, during their time in high school. Former member Ernest "Tone P" Price was a part of Best Kept Secret from 2007 until 2009.

== Production discography ==
=== Wale – 100 Miles & Running (2007) ===
- 02. "DC Gorillaz"
- 03. "Ice Cream Girl"

=== Rhymefest – Mark Ronson Presents: Man In The Mirror (2008) ===
- 02. "Can't Make It"
- 07. "Never Can Say Goodbye" ft. Talib Kweli

=== Wale – The Mixtape About Nothing (2008) ===
- 01. "The Opening Title Sequence"
- 03. "The Feature Heavy Song" ft. Bun B, Pusha T and Tre from UCB
- 05. "The Perfect Plan"
- 06. "The Kramer"
- 07. "The Crazy"
- 08. "Vacation from Ourselves"
- 10. "The Grown Up"
- 11. “The Manipulation"
- 12. "Artistic Integrity"
- 18. "The Hype"
- 19. "The End Credits"

=== Robin Thicke – Miscellaneous (2008) ===
- "Magic" Remix ft. Mary J. Blige and Wale Co- Produced w/ Mark Ronson

=== Rhymefest – El Che (2008) ===
- 02. "Talk My Shit"

=== Wale – Back to the Feature (2009) ===
- 08. "Sweatin Out Weaves" ft. UCB
- 22. "New Soul" ft. Yael Naim

=== Young Chris – 30 Days 30 Verses (2009) ===
- 16. "Searching" ft. Bun B and Wale

=== Skyzoo – The Salvation (2009) ===
- 04. "My Interpretation"

=== Wale – Attention Deficit (2009) ===
- 04. "Pretty Girls" ft. Gucci Mane & Weensey
- 08. "Shades" ft. Chrisette Michele
- 14. "Prescription"

=== Wale - Miscellaneous (2009) ===
- "Family Affair"
- "Pretty Girls (Remix)" ft. Fabolous and Chris Brown

=== Logic - Young, Broke & Infamous (2010) ===
- 14. "Ask Em"

=== Shawty Lo - Miscellaneous (2010) ===
- "Say Yeah" ft. Snoop Dogg

=== Wale – More About Nothing (2010) ===
- 03. "The Soup"
- 21. "The Get Away (Fly Away) ft. Northeast Groovers"

=== Mike Posner – The Layover (2011) ===
- 12. "21 Days"
- 13. "Attitudes" ft. Casey Veggies

=== Skyzoo – The Great Debater (2011) ===
- 01. "Complicated Rhythm"
- 06. "We Here"

=== Nipsey Hussle - TMC: X-Tra Laps (2012) ===
- 01. "Faith"

=== Kendrick Lamar and Jay Rock - The Vault (2012) ===
- "Hands Up"

=== Schoolboy Q – Habits & Contradictions (2012) ===
- 03. "Hands on the Wheel" ft. ASAP Rocky
  - Sample credit: "Pursuit of Happiness" - Lissie

=== Skyzoo - A Dream Deferred (2012) ===
- 11. "How to Make It Through Hysteria"

=== Tinashe - Reverie (2012) ===
- 05. "Another Me"

=== Epic Rap Battles of History (Season 2) (2013) ===
- Ep. 28 "Adam vs Eve" ft. Jenna Marbles

=== Tinashe - Black Water (2013) ===
- 06. "Midnight Sun"

=== Wale - (2014) ===
- "Royals (Remix)" ft. Magazeen

=== Rittz - Next to Nothing (2014) ===
- 08. "In My Zone" ft. Mike Posner and B.o.B
- 12. "Going Through Hell" ft. Mike Posner

=== Teyana Taylor - VII (2014) ===
- 02. "Just Different"

=== Wale - Festivus (2014) ===
- 09. "Chess" ft. Jerry Seinfeld

=== Tabi Bonney - Miscellaneous (2014) ===
- "Poom Poom"

=== Estelle - True Romance (2015) ===
- 05. "Timeshare (Suite 509)"

=== Wale - The Album About Nothing (2015) ===
- 12. "The Bloom (AG3)"

=== Cyhi the Prynce - (2015) ===
- "Elephant in the Room"

=== Dr. Dre - Compton (2015) ===
- 06. "Darkside" ft. King Mez

=== Rittz - Top of the Line (2016) ===
- 05. "Inside of the Groove" ft. Mike Posner and E-40

=== Wale - (2016) ===
- "Heisman Watch"

=== Jidenna - The Chief (2017) ===
- 06. "Long Live the Chief"

=== SZA - Ctrl (2017) ===
- 08. "Garden (Say It like Dat)"

=== Bekon - Get With the Times (2018) ===
- 01. "7am"
- 02. "America"
- 03. "Cold As Ice"
- 04. "9am"
- 05. "Oxegen"
- 06. "Catch Me If You Can"
- 07. "Mama Olivia"
- 08. "12pm"
- 09. "17"
- 10. "30"
- 11. "4pm"
- 12. "Get With The Times"
- 13. "7pm"
- 14. "Candy and Promises"
- 15. "10pm Soda Break"
- 16. "In Your Honor"

=== Lolawolf - (2018) ===
- "Baby I'm Dyin'"

=== Marsha Ambrosius - Nyla (2018) ===
- 09. "Today" (produced with Focus...)
- 13. "Scorn"

=== H.E.R. - I Used to Know Her: Part 2 (2018) ===
- 07. "Fate"
- 08. "Lord is Coming"

=== Wale - Miscellaneous (2019) ===
- "09 Folarin"

=== Higher Brothers - Five Stars (Higher Brothers album) (2019) ===
- "Do It Like Me" ft. JID

=== Rich Brian - The Sailor (2019) ===
- 01. "The Sailor"
- 02. "Rapapapa" ft. RZA
- 04. "Kids"
- 05. "Drive Safe"
- 06. "Confetti"
- 07. "Vacant"
- 08. "No Worries"
- 11. "Curious"
- 12. "Where Does the Time Go" ft. Joji

=== H.E.R. - I Used to Know Her (2019) ===
- 02. "Fate"
- 19. "Lord is Coming" ft. YBN Cordae

=== Rich Brian - Miscellaneous (2020) ===
- "Bali" ft. Guapdad 4000

=== Rich Brian - 1999 (2020) ===
- "Love in My Pocket"

=== Joji - Nectar (2020) ===
- 01. "Ew"

=== Easy Life - Life's a Beach (2021) ===
- 01. "A Message to Myself"

=== Shang-Chi and the Legend of the Ten Rings: The Album (2021) ===
- 01. "Always Rising" (performed by Niki, Rich Brian, and Warren Hue)
- 02. "Diamonds + and Pearls" (performed by DPR Live, DPR Ian and peace.)
- 07. "Lose Control" (performed by JJ Lin)
- 10. "Foolish" (performed by Rich Brian, Warren Hue, and Guapdad 4000)
- 12. "Act Up" (performed by Rich Brian and EarthGang)
- 17. "Hot Soup" (performed by 88rising and Simu Liu)
- 18. "Warriors" (performed by Warren Hue and Seori)

=== Rich Brian - Brightside (2022) ===
- 04. "Sunny"

=== Easy Life - "MAYBE IN ANOTHER LIFE" (2022) ===
- . 09. "CROCODILE TEARS"

=== Tanna Leone - "Sleepy Soldier" (2022) ===
- 13. "If There's A God"
- 14. "February"

=== Kendrick Lamar - Mr. Morale & the Big Steppers (2022) ===
- 06. "Auntie Diaries"
- 09. "Mirror"

=== Fousheé - Softcore (2022) ===
- 08. "Unexplainable"

=== Hozier - "Eat Your Young" (2023) ===
- 01. "Eat Your Young"

=== Hozier - "Unreal Unearth" (2023) ===
- 06. "Eat Your Young"
- 14. "Abstract (Psychopomp)"
- 16. "First Light"

=== 1999 Write The Future - hella (2024) ===
- 01. "avOcadO SHakE"
- 14. "PrAisE nIgHt BluES InteRLUde ft. Dumbfounded

=== Hozier - Unheard (2024) ===
- 03. "Empire Now"

=== Ravyn Lenae - Bird's Eye (2024) ===
- 07. "Love Me Not"

=== Ravyn Lenae - (2024) ===
- "Love Me Not" Remix ft. Rex Orange County

=== Kendrick Lamar - GNX (2024) ===
- 01. "Wacced Out Murals"
- 04. "Man at the Garden"

=== Big L - Harlem's Finest: Return of the King (2025) ===
- 10. "Stretch & Bob Freestyle ('98) Intro" ft. Donald Phinazee & Sacha Jenkins
- 11. "Stretch & Bobbito Freestyle ('98)"

=== Ravyn Lenae - Blue Island (2026) ===
- 02. "Familiar Dreams"
