= Attention Deficit (album) =

Studio album by Wale
- Released: November 10, 2009
- Genre: Alternative hip-hop
- Length: 53:42
- Labels: Allido; Interscope
- Producers: Mark Ronson (also exec.); Best Kept Secret; Cool & Dre; David Sitek; Dejion; J.U.S.T.I.C.E. League; The Neptunes; The Sleepwalkers

Wale chronology
The Mixtape About Nothing (2008)	Attention Deficit (2009)	Ambition (2011)

Singles from Attention: Deficit
- 1. "Chillin" Released: April 14, 2009; 2. "World Tour" Released: September 8, 2009; 3. "Pretty Girls" Released: October 6, 2009

Attention Deficit is the debut studio album by American rapper Wale. It was released on November 10, 2009, by Allido Records and Interscope Records. The production on the album was handled by multiple producers including Mark Ronson, Cool & Dre, the Neptunes, J.U.S.T.I.C.E. League and David Sitek among others. The album also features guest appearances by Lady Gaga, Gucci Mane, J. Cole, Pharrell Williams and Jazmine Sullivan among others.

Attention Deficit was supported by three singles: "Chillin", "World Tour" and "Pretty Girls". The album received generally positive reviews from music critics and received moderate commercial success. It debuted at number 21 on the US Billboard 200 chart, selling 28,000 copies in its first week.

== Singles ==
The album's lead single "Chillin" featuring Lady Gaga, was released on April 14, 2009. The song was a charter hit. It peaked at number 12 on the UK Singles Chart on the chart ending September 12, 2009. It also spent a total of 6 weeks on the chart. This is Wale's highest-charting single in the United Kingdom.

The album's second single "World Tour" featuring Jazmine Sullivan, was released on September 8, 2009.

The album's third single "Pretty Girls" featuring Gucci Mane and Weensey (of Backyard Band), was released on October 6, 2009.

== Critical reception ==
Professional ratings
Aggregate scores
Source	Rating
Metacritic	(77/100)
Review scores
Source	Rating
AllMusic	4/5 stars
The A.V. Club	B+
Entertainment Weekly	B
The New York Times	favorable
Pitchfork	(6.6/10.0)
PopMatters	(7/10)
Rolling Stone	3/5 stars
Slant Magazine	4/5 stars
The Washington Post	favorable
XXL	(XL)

Attention Deficit received generally favorable reviews from music critics. At Metacritic, which assigns a normalized rating out of 100 to reviews from mainstream critics, the album received an average score of 77, based on 21 reviews, which indicates "generally favorable". David Jeffries of AllMusic gave the album a favorable review. The A.V. Club's Nathan Rabin gave the album a B+ rating.

== Commercial performance ==
Attention Deficit debuted at number 21 on the US Billboard 200 chart, selling 28,000 copies in its first week. As of November 2011, the album has sold over 200,000 copies in the United States, according to Nielsen Soundscan.

== Track listing ==
No.	Title	Writer(s)	Producer(s)	Length
1.	"Triumph"	Olubowale Akintimehin; David Andrew Sitek	Dave Sitek	2:25
2.	"Mama Told Me"	Akintimehin; Julian Nixon; Craig Balmoris	Best Kept Secret	3:37
3.	"Mirrors" (featuring Bun B)	Akintimehin; Mark Ronson; Bernard Freeman	Ronson	4:17
4.	"Pretty Girls" (featuring Gucci Mane & Weensey from Backyard Band)	Akintimehin; Nixon; Balmoris; Radric Davis; Weensey	Best Kept Secret	4:11
5.	"World Tour" (featuring Jazmine Sullivan)	Akintimehin; Jazmine Sullivan; Marcello Valenzano; Andre Lyons	Cool & Dre	3:47
6.	"Let It Loose" (featuring Pharrell Williams)	Akintimehin; Pharrell Williams; Chad Hugo	The Neptunes	4:49
7.	"90210"	Akintimehin; Ronson	Ronson; Dejion	3:27
8.	"Shades" (featuring Chrisette Michele)	Akintimehin; Nixon; Balmoris; Chrisette Payne	Best Kept Secret	3:56
9.	"Chillin" (featuring Lady Gaga)	Akintimehin; Stefani Germanotta; Valenzano; Lyons; Gary DeCarlo; Dale Frashuer; Roy C Hammond; Paul Leka; Makeba Riddick; Kirk Robinson	Cool & Dre	3:24
10.	"TV in the Radio" (featuring K'naan)	Akintimehin; Sitek; Keinan Warsame	Dave Sitek	3:20
11.	"Contemplate"	Akintimehin; Reginald Perry; Shaffer Smith; Shea Taylor; Shawn Carter	Syience	3:33
12.	"Diary" (featuring Marsha Ambrosius)	Akintimehin; Marsha Ambrosius	The Sleepwalkers	4:31
13.	"Beautiful Bliss" (featuring Melanie Fiona & J. Cole)	Akintimehin; James D'Agostino; Ronson; Melanie Fiona; Jermaine Cole	DJ Green Lantern; Ronson	5:04
14.	"Prescription"	Akintimehin; Nixon; Balmoris	Best Kept Secret	3:27

iTunes bonus tracks
No.	Title	Writer(s)	Producer(s)	Length
15.	"My Sweetie"	Akintimehin; Stephen Levitin	Apple Juice Kid	3:37
16.	"Center of Attention"	Akintimehin; Kevin Crowe; Erik Ortiz	J.U.S.T.I.C.E. League	3:56

Zune bonus tracks
No.	Title	Writer(s)	Producer(s)	Length
17.	"Be Right"	Akintimehin; Deleno Matthews; Levar Coppin	Sean C & LV	4:01

Samples credits

- "Pretty Girls" contains a sample of Backyard Band's go-go rendition of "Girls" by The Moments & Whatnauts
- "Chillin" contains a sample of "Na Na Hey Hey Kiss Him Goodbye" by Steam
- "Mama Told Me" contains a sample of "Summer Madness" by Kool and the Gang
- "Contemplate" contains a sample of "Question Existing" from the album Good Girl Gone Bad by Rihanna
- "Diary" contains a sample of "La Valse d'Amélie" by Yann Tiersen
- "My Sweetie" contains a sample of "Let Me Love You" by Bunny Mack
- "Beautiful Bliss" contains a sample of "(Do It, Do It) No One Does It Better" by The Spinners and "Theme Music to a Drive By" By Lupe Fiasco
- "World Tour" contains a sample of "Award Tour" by A Tribe Called Quest
- "Prescription" contains an interpolated sample of "Modaji" by Dave Grusin

== Charts ==
=== Weekly charts ===
Chart (2009)	Peak position
US Billboard 200	21
US Top R&B/Hip-Hop Albums (Billboard)	3
US Top Rap Albums (Billboard)	2

Chart (2010)	Peak position
US Top R&B/Hip-Hop Albums (Billboard)	64
US Top Rap Albums (Billboard)	13

=== Year-end charts ===
Chart (2010)	Peak position
US Top R&B/Hip-Hop Albums (Billboard)	61
US Top Rap Albums (Billboard)	31
