= Onra =

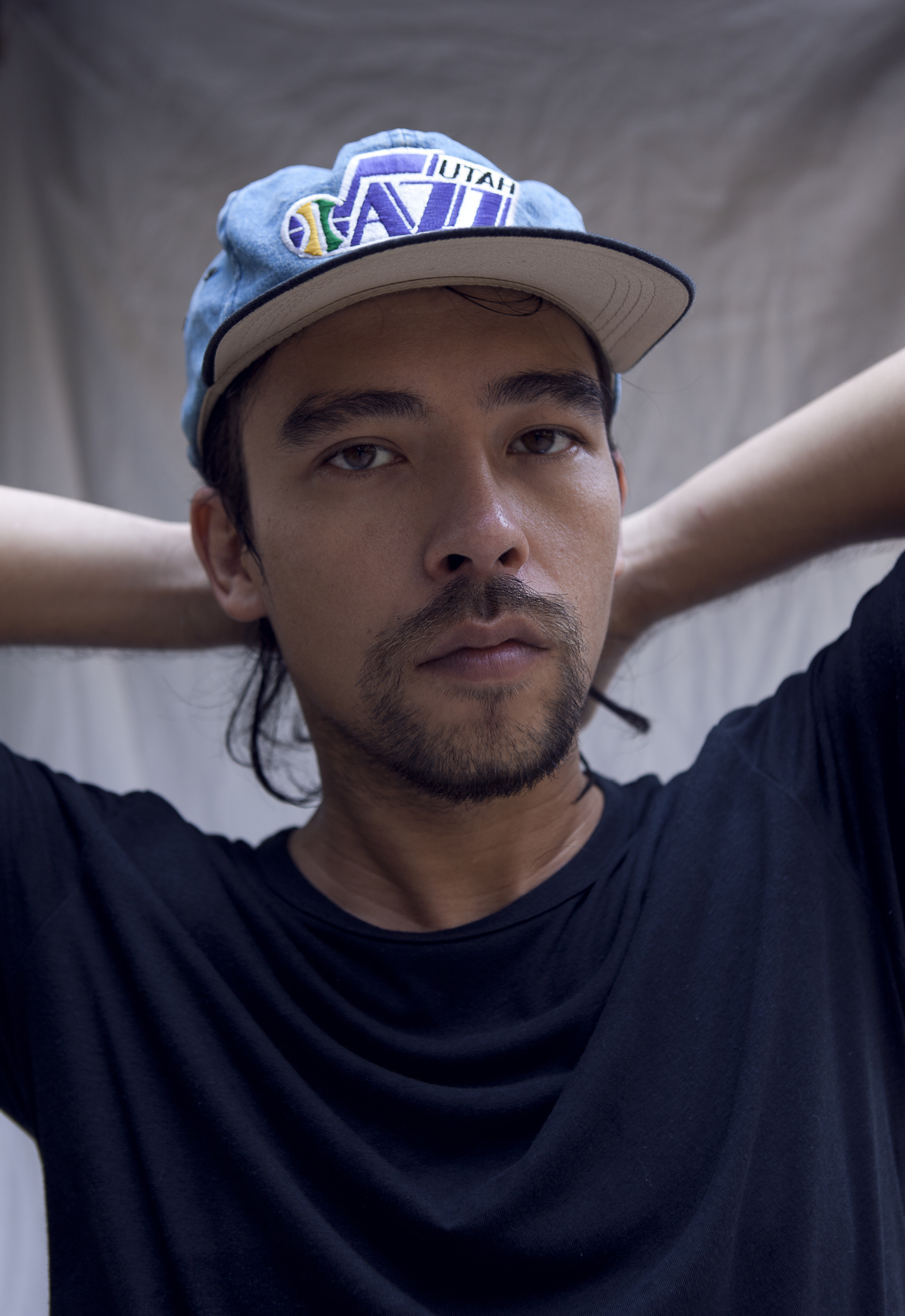
- Onra in 2016

Background information
- Born: Arnaud Antoine Rene Bernard; Trier, Germany
- Origin: Paris, France
- Genres: Hip hop, Electro
- Instrument: Akai MPC1000
- Years active: 2006–present
- Labels: All City Records, Fool's Gold Records

Arnaud Antoine Rene Bernard, better known by his stage name Onra, is a French hip hop beatmaker based in Paris. His musical style is a "chopped up set of RnB laden beats and electronically produced experiments laced with influences spanning the entire globe".

== Biography ==
Arnaud Bernard was born in 1981 in Germany to French parents. His father is of Vietnamese descent. He moved with his family to France at the age of three. He discovered a passion for music at the age of ten and started making music at the age of nineteen. In 2000, he moved to Paris to pursue studies. He graduated from business school in 2006 with a degree in marketing with the intention to create his own record label.

The first album was made in collaboration with producer and friend Quetzal (Al Quetz) in 2006, Tribute, a project inspired by soul music.

At the same time, he started collaborating with Byron the Aquarius, a keyboard player from Alabama; using the name Byron & Onra, the pair released the album The Big Payback on Japanese label Circulations in 2007. They also appeared on compilations such as Beat Dimensions and New Worlds by Jay Scarlett.

In 2006, he went to Vietnam for the first time, and brought back over 30 Chinese and Vietnamese records from the 1960s and 1970s. He released the album Chinoiseries the following year, created using samples from these records; these were followed by Chinoiseries Pt. 2 in 2011 and Chinoiseries Pt. 3 in 2017.

In 2008, he was selected to attend the Red Bull Music Academy in Barcelona and started touring around the world shortly after.

In 2010, Onra released the LP Long Distance on All City Records, which features tracks with Olivier DaySoul, fellow French beatmaker Walter Mecca, and T3 from Slum Village, soul singer Reggie B and keyboard player Buddy Sativa. It received press coverage from outlets such as Pitchfork, which gave the album a rating of 8.0 out of 10, as well as Jay-Z's blog, LifeAndTimes.

In 2011, Onra released Chinoiseries Pt.2 on All City Records, built on samples of Chinese music found in China, Thailand and Vietnam. In 2012, Onra released his newest EP Deep In The Night on Fool's Gold Records.

Onra began a collaborative project with fellow French producer Buddy Sativa, which they called Yatha Butha Jazz Combo, eventually releasing an album of the same name in 2013. The album consists of 12 spiritual jazz tracks, mostly improvised; it was "created as a therapeutic break from their other constraining aliases, and not originally intended for public release."

In 2015, Onra released a hip hop/R&B album Fundamentals, featuring different vocal guests such as Daz Dillinger, Black Milk and Do Or Die.

Chinoiseries Pt. 3 was released in 2017 on All City Records.

The Anthem, from Chinoiseries Pt. 1, gained new attention in 2026 when it was used as the outro song for the Tip2Tip series created by Youtubers Ludwig Ahgren and Michael Reeves, where the two drove motorcycles from the South of China to the border with Mongolia.

== Discography ==
=== Studio albums ===
- Present Tribute Bo Bun Records (2006)
- Chinoiseries (2xLP) Favorite Recordings (2007)
- Chinoiseries (CD) Label Rouge Prod (2007); Bo Bun Records (2008)
- 1.0.8 (LP, CD) Favorite Recordings, Bo Bun Records 2009
- Long Distance (2xLP, CD) All City Records (2010)
- Chinoiseries Pt.2 (2xLP, CD) All City Records (2011)
- Fundamentals (2xLP, CD) All City Dublin (2015)
- Chinoiseries Pt.3 (2xLP, WEB) All City Records (2017)
- Nobody Has to Know (2xLP, CD, Tape, Web) All City Records (2018)
- Nosthaigia All City Records (2024)
- After Dark All City Dublin (2026)

=== Singles and EPs ===
- The Big Payback (12") Just Like Vibes (2007)
- Tribute EP (7", EP, White or Pink vinyl) Bo Bun Records (2007)
- My Comet / Shhhhhhh (7", Ltd) All City Records (2008)
- Tribute EP II (7") Favorite Recordings (2008)
- Chinoiseries (7", Ltd) Favorite Recordings (2009)
- Deep in the Night (12") Fool's Gold (2012)
- Supreme Sound from Paris (feat. Walter Mecca) (12") Skullcandy Supreme Sound (2012)
- Over & Over (feat. Daz Dillinger and Do Or Die & Johnny P) (12") All City Records (2015)
