= Chillin (Wale song) =

Single by Wale featuring Lady Gaga

from the album Attention Deficit
- Released: April 14, 2009
- Recorded: 2009
- Studio: Allido (New York City)
- Genre: Hip hop; electro-funk
- Length: 3:24
- Label: Allido
- Songwriters: Olubowale Akintimehin; Gary De Carlo; Dale Frashuer; Stefani Germanotta; Roy C Hammond; Paul Leka; Andre Christopher Lyon; Makeba Riddick; Kirk Robinson; Marcello Valenzano
- Producer: Cool & Dre

Wale singles chronology
"Change" (2009)	"Chillin" (2009)	"World Tour" (2009)

Lady Gaga singles chronology
"LoveGame" (2009)	"Chillin" (2009)	"Paparazzi" (2009)

Music video
- "Chillin" on YouTube

"Chillin" is a song by American rapper Wale, featuring American singer Lady Gaga. It was released by Allido Records on April 14, 2009 as the lead single from his debut album, Attention Deficit. Wale had wanted to collaborate with Gaga, and met the singer through a mutual connection with Mark Ronson, the rapper's label boss and Gaga's frequent producer. "Chillin" was composed by a number of songwriters, including Wale and Gaga, while it was produced by Cool & Dre. Recorded in New York City, the song discusses Wale's life in his hometown. It has musical influence of 1990s style rapping, and contains two samples from the 1969 song "Na Na Hey Hey Kiss Him Goodbye" by the band Steam, and the 1987 song, "Top Billin'", by Audio Two.

The song received mixed reviews from contemporary critics. Some praised Wale and Gaga's collaboration and composition, while others criticized it. "Chillin" reached number 12 on the UK Singles Chart, while in the United States it peaked at number 99 on the Billboard Hot 100. The song also reached the lower regions of the record charts in some other nations. The accompanying music video features both Wale and Gaga in various locations in and around Washington, D.C., and Boston, Massachusetts.

== Background and writing ==
Wale had wanted to collaborate with Lady Gaga on the track since January 2009, believing that she embodied the party-record feel of the song. He explained: "If music was a high school, I feel like I'll be the dude on the football team, and it would be like, 'OK, Gaga's having a party!' And you know all the bad girls are going to be out there." Upon hearing that some were surprised by the collaboration, Wale went on to say, "If Jay-Z can work with Coldplay, then Wale should be able to work with Gaga." Wale's mentor, Mark Ronson, sent the track to Gaga. She commented that her portion of the song, which includes lyrics such as "Lookin' at, lookin' at, lookin' at me/ Eyes all stickin' like honey on bees", is narcissistic, but in a positive way. The lyrics capture the life and image of Wale's home areas Maryland and District of Columbia. About incorporating the hook in the song, Gaga said:

I really wanted to sit down with Wale before I wrote the hook, because to me, it's really lame when people send you tracks, and they're like, 'All right, Gaga, throw your vocals on it.' This is Wale's record. It's not my record. It's one of those songs, one of those tracks and one of those videos that you can't stop listening to.

== Recording and composition ==
"Chillin"
A 21-second sample of "Chillin", illustrating the usage of the Steam song, "Na Na Hey Hey Kiss Him Goodbye", and the opening freestyle singing by Gaga, followed by Wale's rapping.

Along with Wale and Gaga, songwriters who worked on "Chillin" included Gary De Carlo, Dale Frashuer, Roy C Hammond, Paul Leka, Andre Christopher Lyon, Makeba Riddick, Kirk Robinson and Marcello Valenzano. "Chillin" has influence of 1990s style rapping, and samples from the 1969 song "Na Na Hey Hey Kiss Him Goodbye" by Steam, and the 1987 song "Top Billin'" by Audio Two. The song is written in the time signature of common time with a tempo of 100 beats per minute, and is composed in the key of G minor. Nathan Rabin from The A.V. Club called it a "throwback slab of electro-funk", with robotic new wave inspired vocals by Gaga. After starting with the Steam sample, the song has a stripped-down beat with a bass drum and synth-claps, and synthesizers on the verses and the sample being looped in the chorus, with Gaga interjecting her verses in-between. Lyrically it has Wale's name repeated throughout and the rapper talking about things he has in comparison to other people, opening with the line "This how you start off '09, kickin' in the door and I'm everybody's problem". He also refers to fellow rapper M.I.A. with the line "I'm the same way, M.I.A./ Me, Cool and Dre get high like planes".

Produced by Cool & Dre, the song was recorded at Allido Sound Studios in New York, by Derek Pacuk, while the mixing was done by Serban Ghanea. Wale recalled in a 2011 interview with MTV News for Lady Gaga: Inside the Outside special, that the recording session did not go easy. He had traveled to the New York recording studio from Washington, D.C., after a long night of partying. Gaga was already in the studio in her exuberant style with a big ribbon atop her head by which Wale was taken aback, and was a "cultural difference" for him. In an effort to warm up to each other they made small talk about their respective record deals with Interscope. By the end of the session, Gaga had created five different hooks for "Chillin" and added her vocals on the track. The rapper added, "It took a while. Once we finally got the ball rolling, it was almost time to go. It was natural though. It's wack when you get in the studio with somebody and it's automatically music time—it feels fake. We were trying to feel each other out." Wale later added that he would like to collaborate with Gaga again on a track but it was unknown to him if Gaga would be interested.

== Music video ==
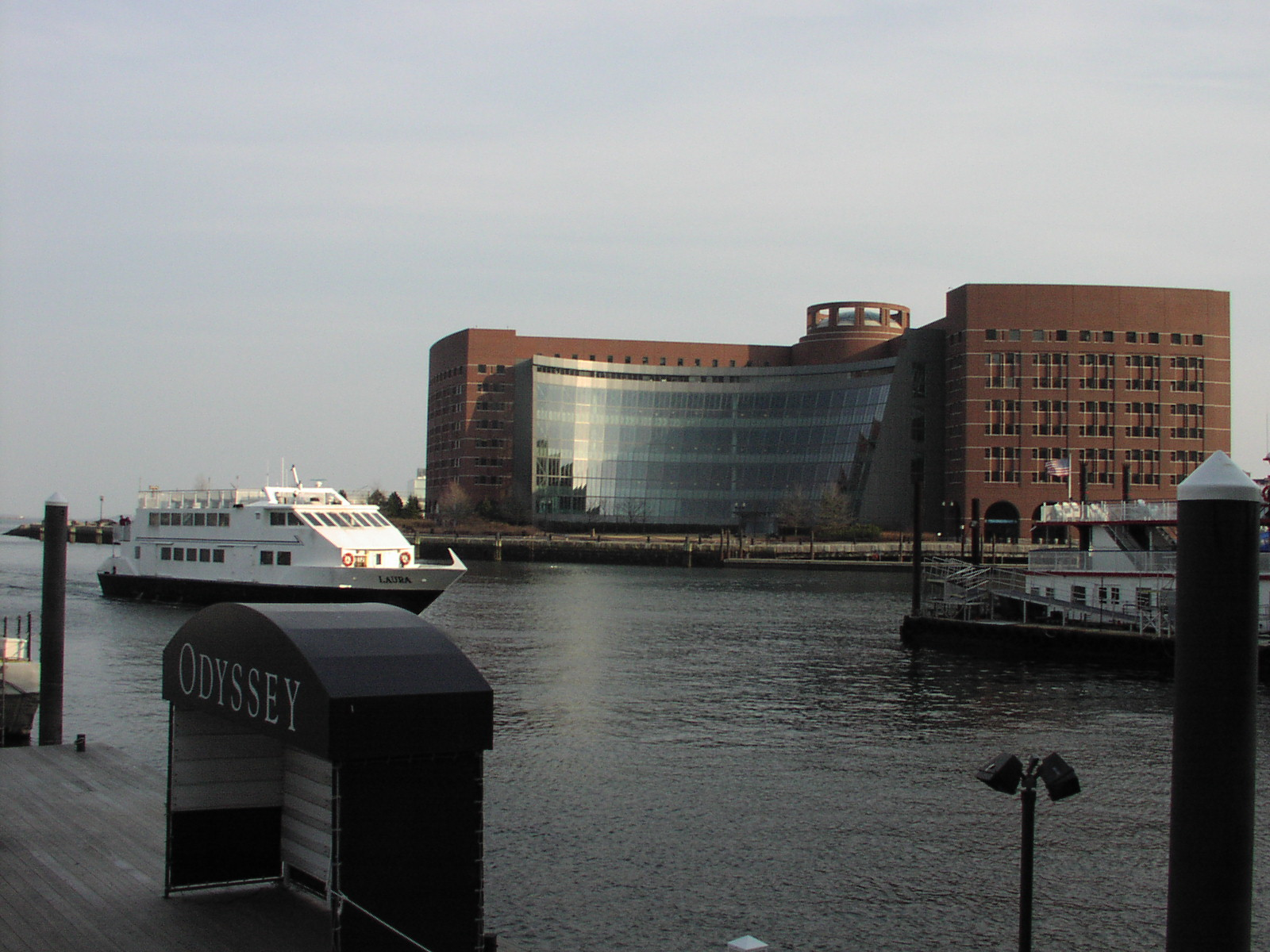
South Boston Waterfront, one of the locations where the video was shot

The music video for the song was directed by Chris Robinson and was posted on Interscope's YouTube channel on June 12, 2009. It features guest appearances from rappers Young Chris, Tre, Pusha T, Anwan Glover and Bun B. The video shows Wale and Gaga at the District of Columbia's Cardozo Senior High School and Wale in various venues and streets in the District, including South Boston Waterfront. This includes one scene in the famous hidden clothing store Bodega in Boston where Wale tries on various clothes. One of Gaga's characteristic Great Danes, which had also previously appeared in the music videos for "Just Dance" and "Poker Face", appears in the video for "Chillin", wearing Beats by Dr. Dre headphones. Several posters of Barack Obama appear in the video. The music video was added to BET's TV rotation in the United States. Chrissy Andrews from MuchMusic complimented Gaga's appearance in the music video, saying that "this is the most 'toned down' I've ever seen Lady Gaga. She's wearing a short dress with pumps, but she's surprisingly without her facial lightning bolt, crystal staff or orbiting head piece (as seen on her Ellen appearance). One of the two massive dogs from her other videos does make an appearance, however... with headphones on! Even without all of the crazy things we know Gaga for, she's still great in this video."

== Critical reception ==
"Chillin" received mixed reviews from critics. Steve Roberts from MTV praised Gaga's verse and for employing a similar singing style to M.I.A. Jason Lipshutz from Billboard complimented the "club-ready single" for its "bouncy hook and slick verses" and called the song "the perfect precursor to Wale's long-awaited debut". Mehan Jayasuriya from PopMatters commended the song for being a "token party jam" on the album track list. She added that "for all the flack that the [track] has caught, it's still an indisputably catchy song, even if the 9th Wonder and Nick Catchdubs reworking from [Wale's] Back to the Feature stands as the definitive version." Andres Tardio from HipHopDX believed the composition of the song as "Pop-friendly". A reviewer for XXL compared and described "Chillin" as "distinctly D.C.-sounding anthem". David Jeffries from AllMusic praised Wale's "natural delivery and quirky sense of humor" in the song, likening his vocals to that of Jay-Z and Gaga's vocals to that of singer Rihanna. Describing "Chillin" as a "club-friendly hopper", Chris Richards from The Washington Post believed that using Rihanna or M.I.A. on the track would have made it successful, rather than Gaga who was then considered a relatively unknown singer. Richards recalled a similar situation when Washington, D.C.–based go-go band Experience Unlimited had collaborated with androgynous singer Grace Jones on a track. Sobhi Youssef from Sputnikmusic noticed that the song's production made it sound like a different track than the rest of Attention Deficit.

Mosi Reeves from Spin criticized Gaga's "wanna-be-M.I.A. cadences", calling it "unnecessarily crass". Another review from Spin by Brandon Soderberg panned the song, saying that "[i]t wasn't a Wale song and it wasn't a Gaga song with Wale wedged in there somewhere, either. 'Chillin' became something of an Internet rap watershed moment". Sean Fennessey from Pitchfork Media described the song as "much-maligned", adding that "there won't be much to gain from ['Chillin']... This was the first step in Wale's multiple personality debacle and he seems to know as much—nothing else on Attention Deficit resembles the goofy sneakers-shouting writing here." In another review, Ryan Dombal from the same website criticized Wale's repetition of his name and the usage of the samples calling it "unnecessary". Brian Howe from Paste described the track as "flashy and hollow". The Greyhound gave the song a negative review and believed that "with a lackluster hook and the repetition of the name 'Wale,' the airplay and sales of this single will depend greatly upon the vocals of Lady Gaga." Wilson McBee from Slant Magazine criticized both "Chillin" and the follow-up single, "World Tour", as "tepid Cool & Dre productions in which Wale seems to be attempting Black Eyed Peas-style halftime-show rap." McBee believed that the songs did not represent the true nature of the album. Prefix magazine was also critical of the song saying that "just when you think Wale understands the consequences of mindlessly horny partying... he gives us the dumb, cheaply agreeable Lady Gaga feature 'Chillin'."

== Chart performance ==
The song performed moderately on the record charts. In the United States, the song debuted on the Billboard Hot 100 at number 99 but fell off the next week. It also reached a peak of number 26 on the Rhythmic Top 40 chart. According to Nielsen SoundScan, "Chillin" has sold 354,000 units in the US as of December 2010. In Canada the song reached a peak of number 73. "Chillin" charted on the ARIA Charts of Australia where it debuted number 29, and was present for a total of eight weeks. The song performed moderately in the United Kingdom and Ireland, where it reached peaks of number 12 and 19, respectively. It also charted on Billboard's Euro Digital Tracks, peaking at number 18.

== Track listing and formats ==
Digital download

1. "Chillin" (feat. Lady Gaga) – 3:29

US 12" Vinyl edition

1. "Chillin" (feat. Lady Gaga) (Clean) – 3:18
2. "Chillin" (feat. Lady Gaga) (Dirty) – 3:19
3. "Chillin" (Instrumental) – 3:20

US 12" Picture Disc

1. "Chillin" (Wideboys Project Bassline Mix) – 5:12
2. "Chillin" (Marc Jb Dub Mix) – 6:40
3. "Chillin" (Lee Dagger Extended Mix) – 6:24
4. "Chillin" (Bimbo Jones Club Mix) – 5:57

European CD single

1. "Chillin" (feat. Lady Gaga) – 3:18
2. "Nike Boots" – 4:19

== Credits and personnel ==
Credits adapted from the liner notes of Attention Deficit.

- Wale – songwriting, rapping
- Lady Gaga – songwriting, singing
- Gary De Carlo – songwriting
- Dale Frashuer – songwriting
- Roy C Hammond – songwriting
- Paul Leka – songwriting
- Andre Christopher Lyon – songwriting
- Makeba Riddick – songwriting
- Kirk Robinson – songwriting
- Marcello Valenzano – songwriting
- Cool & Dre – producer
- Derek Pacuk – recording engineer
- Serban Ghanea – audio mixing

== Charts ==
Weekly chart performance for "Chillin"
Chart (2009)	Peak; position
Australia (ARIA)	29
Belgium (Ultratip Bubbling Under Flanders)	20
Canada Hot 100 (Billboard)	73
Euro Digital Tracks (Billboard)	18
Ireland (IRMA)	19
Scottish Singles Sales (Official Charts)	26
UK Singles (Official Charts)	12
UK Hip Hop/R&B (Official Charts)	5
US Billboard Hot 100	99
US Latin Rhythm Airplay (Billboard)	33
US Rhythmic Airplay (Billboard)	26

== Release history ==
Release dates and formats for "Chillin"
Country	Date	Format	Label(s)	Ref.
United States	April 24, 2009	Digital download	Allido	
United States	May 5, 2009	12-inch	Allido	
United States	May 6, 2009	12-inch picture disc	Allido	
Europe	May 16, 2009	CD	Interscope	
United States	June 8, 2009	Rhythmic contemporary radio	Allido; Interscope	
United States	August 4, 2009	Contemporary hit radio	Allido; Interscope	
