= Pretty Girls (Wale song) =

Single by Wale featuring Gucci Mane

from the album Attention Deficit
- Released: October 6, 2009
- Recorded: 2009
- Genre: Hip hop; go-go
- Length: 4:13
- Label: Allido Records • Interscope
- Songwriters: Wale Folarin; Radric Davis; Weensey
- Producer: Best Kept Secret

Wale singles chronology
"World Tour" (2009)	"Pretty Girls" (2009)	"No Hands" (2010)

Gucci Mane singles chronology
"I Get It In" (2009)	"Pretty Girls" (2009)	"Spotlight" (2009)

"Pretty Girls" is the third official single from Wale's debut album, Attention Deficit, and is produced by Best Kept Secret. It features Gucci Mane and Weensey from the go-go band Backyard Band. It was released to iTunes and Rhapsody on October 6, 2009. The song samples Backyard Band's go-go rendition of The Moments and The Whatnauts track "Girls" and contains a line of UCB's song "Splash Girl". The official remix featuring Chris Brown and Fabolous was released on April 13, 2010. A second remix features Weensey, Raheem DeVaughn, and Phil Ade.

The music video was filmed in Los Angeles, California and was directed by Chris Robinson. Gucci Mane does not appear in the video due to his serving a one-year prison sentence at the time. There are appearances in the video by Washington Redskins' running back Clinton Portis, Baltimore Ravens' running back Ray Rice, Curren$y, DJ Khaled and actor Tristan Wilds.

== Charts ==
Chart (2010)	Peak position
US Hot R&B/Hip-Hop Songs (Billboard)	56
