= Hypnos (album) =

Studio album by Ravyn Lenae
- Released: May 20, 2022
- Recorded: 2018–2022
- Genres: R&B; neo soul
- Length: 53:32
- Label: Atlantic
- Producers: Luke Titus; Steve Lacy; Monte Booker; Phoelix; Teo Halm; IAmNobodi; Sango; Kaytranada; Fousheé

Ravyn Lenae chronology
Crush (2018)	Hypnos (2022)	Bird's Eye (2024)

Singles from Hypnos
- 1. "Skin Tight" Released: February 1, 2022; 2. "Light Me Up" Released: March 18, 2022; 3. "M.I.A." Released: April 19, 2022; 4. "Xtasy" Released: May 17, 2022

Hypnos is the debut album by American singer and songwriter Ravyn Lenae. It was released on May 20, 2022, through Atlantic Records. The album includes guest appearances and production from Monte Booker, Steve Lacy, Kaytranada, Fousheé, Mereba, Smino, Sango, Luke Titus, IAmNobodi, Phoelix and Teo Halm. The artwork of the album was shot by Quil Lemons.

== Background ==
The album was recorded over a four-year period during which Lenae relocated to Los Angeles following the COVID-19 pandemic.

== Musical style ==
Hypnos is primarily an alternative R&B record with elements of dance music, R&B, house music, soul music, and Afrobeat.

== Singles and promotion ==
On February 1, 2022, the first single, "Skin Tight", featuring Steve Lacy was released alongside the music video. On March 18, 2022, Lenae released the second single "Light Me Up" with the video. On April 19, 2022, Lenae released the third single "M.I.A." On May 17, 2022, Lenae released the fourth and final single "Xtasy" produced by Kaytranada. On September 14, 2022, she released a remix of "Xtasy" featuring Doechii.

=== Tour ===
Lenae announced a tour spanning 16 cities beginning at Neumos in Seattle, Washington. A special guest, Unusual Demont, will support the tour.

== Critical reception ==
Professional ratings
Review scores
Source	Rating
AllMusic	4.5/5 stars
Clash	8/10
The Guardian	4/5 stars
HotNewHipHop	5/5 stars
Loud and Quiet	8/10
Pitchfork	8.5/10

Gio Santiago for Pitchfork gave the album a "Best New Music" designation, writing that it "arrives as a mature reintroduction, a love-stained, moody transport that flies through Lenae’s world with a featherlight cadence. Lenae surveys the recent history of soul, alternative R&B, and even Afrobeats with precision. But most importantly, her debut showcases her ascendant vocal prowess as she moves across her wide range with ease. Lenae’s transcendental poise establishes her as a resonant voice in R&B. Even as she touches on trends and familiar themes, it’s Lenae’s delivery, confidence, and alluring presence that makes HYPNOS stand apart. As she considers her anxieties, hopes, and doubts, she reveres the musical icons before her in ways that show just how ready she is for her own turn."

Rob Murray for Clash opined: "Her first major project since 2018, 'Hypnos' has the feeling of creative release, a sense of emotions expunged and experiences extinguished. A gorgeous listen with a deep, lasting resonance, 'Hypnos' finds Ravyn Lenae rising to the challenge of her peers, and raising the bar once more."

Jasleen Dhindsa for Loud and Quiet called Hypnos "a colourful and other-worldly debut, aligning with its obvious influences but also way beyond that, capturing the same unconventional essence as Janet Jackson in her '90s prime. Ravyn Lenae is invigorating and distorting R&B, fit for her Gen Z digital milieu."

Andrew Sacher for BrooklynVegan felt that Hypnos "largely follows the atmospheric, lightly psychedelic, downtempo R&B carved out by artists like SZA, Tinashe, and the self-titled Beyoncé album, and Ravyn's got exactly the right soaring voice and lush production style to pull it off. The whole album sounds gorgeous, and there are a handful of songs that pop out on early listens. A full-length album has been a long time coming for Ravyn, and Hypnos was worth the wait."

Mya Abraham for Vibe writes "[Lenae] provides an elevated ascension with her new offering while remaining true to her core."

=== Year-end lists ===
Hypnos on year-end lists
Publication	List	Rank	Ref.
AllMusic	The Best Albums of 2022	—	
The A.V. Club	The 30 Best Albums of 2022	22	
Beats Per Minute	The Top 50 Albums of 2022	43	
Billboard	The 50 Best Albums of 2022 (So Far)	—	
BrooklynVegan	Our 50 Favorite Albums of 2022	—	
Complex	The 50 Best Albums of 2022	30	
DJ Mag	DJ Mag's Top Albums of 2022	—	
Exclaim!	The 50 Best Albums of 2022	29	
NBHAP	The Records That Made 2022	—	
NPR Music	The Best Albums of 2022	18	
NYLON	NYLON's Favorite Albums of 2022	—	
Okayplayer	Okayplayer's 22 Best Albums of 2022	19	
Pitchfork	The 50 Best Albums of 2022	32	
Uproxx	The Best Albums of 2022	—	

== Track listing ==
Hypnos track listing
No.	Title	Writer(s)	Producer(s)	Length
1.	"Cameo"	Ravyn Lenae Washington	Luke Titus; Steve Lacy	1:24
2.	"Venom"	Washington	Monte Booker	3:29
3.	"Inside Out"	Washington	Titus; Phoelix; Teo Halm	4:11
4.	"M.I.A."	Washington; Dede Ademabua; India Ambré Perkins; Zoi Kachet Harris; Kai Asa Savon Wright	IAMNOBODI; Sango	3:28
5.	"Skin Tight" (featuring Steve Lacy)	Washington; Lacy	Lacy	3:47
6.	"Where I'm From" (featuring Mereba)	Washington; Marian Mereba	Titus; Halm	3:45
7.	"Deep in the World"	Washington	Phoelix; Lacy	3:12
8.	"Higher"	Washington	Booker	1:36
9.	"3D" (featuring Smino)	Washington; Christopher Smith Jr	Booker; Phoelix	3:09
10.	"Satellites"	Washington	Lacy; Booker; Titus	4:26
11.	"Lullabye"	Washington	Booker	3:59
12.	"Light Me Up"	Washington; Lacy; Michael Edward Neil; Titus	Lacy	3:49
13.	"Like You Do"	Washington	Titus; Lacy	1:53
14.	"Xtasy"	Washington; Louis Kevin Celestin	Kaytranada	2:58
15.	"Mercury" (featuring Fousheé)	Washington; Britanny Fousheé	Titus; Fousheé	4:23
16.	"Wish"	Washington	Titus	4:03
Total length:				53:32

== Personnel ==
=== Musicians ===
- Ravyn Lenae – vocals, writing, engineer (tracks 3, 8, 11, 16)
- Luke Titus – production (tracks 1, 3, 6, 10, 13–16), additional production (track 5), writing (tracks 5, 12)
- Steve Lacy – production (tracks 1, 5, 7, 10, 12–13) vocals (track 5), writing (tracks 5, 12)
- Monte Booker – production (tracks 2, 8–9, 11)
- Phoelix – production (tracks 3, 7, 9), writing (track 12)
- Teo Halm – production (tracks 3, 6)
- IAMNOBODI – writing (track 4), production (track 4)
- Sango – writing (track 4), production (track 4)
- KAYTRANADA – production (track 14)
- Foushee – featured artist (track 15), production (track 15)
- Mereba – featured artist (track 6)
- Smino – featured artist (track 9)
- Ambré – writing (track 4)
- Jean Deaux – writing (track 4)

=== Production ===
- J Soundz – engineer (tracks 4, 6, 9)
- Karl Wingate – engineer (tracks 1, 5, 10, 13)
- Tyler Karmen – engineer (tracks 7, 16)
- Bryan Schwaller – engineer (tracks 1–6, 10–11, 13–15), mixing (tracks 2, 8–10)
- Jeff Ellis – mixing (tracks 1, 3–7, 11–16)
- Dale Becker – mastering
- Noah McCorkle – assistant mastering
- Conner Hedge – assistant mastering (tracks 4, 12)

=== Design ===
- Quil Lemons – photographer
- Jeanie Annan-Lewin – creative director
- Jacob Aaron Dillon – hair stylist
- Laura Dudley – makeup artist
