= Bird's Eye (album) =

Studio album by Ravyn Lenae
- Released: August 9, 2024
- Recorded: 2023
- Studios: Fever (North Hollywood); Clear Lake (North Hollywood); Glenwood Place (Burbank)
- Genre: R&B
- Length: 35:39
- Label: Atlantic
- Producers: Craig Balmoris; Dahi; FnZ; J.Lbs; Steve Lacy; Terry Lewis; Daniel McKinnon; Rascal; Ritz Reynolds; Ely Rise; Solomonophonic; Spencer Stewart

Ravyn Lenae chronology
Hypnos (2022)	Bird's Eye (2024)	Blue Island (2026)

Singles from Bird's Eye
- 1. "Love Is Blind" / "Love Me Not" Released: May 3, 2024; 2. "Dream Girl" Released: June 26, 2024; 3. "One Wish" Released: July 26, 2024

Bird's Eye is the second studio album by American singer and songwriter Ravyn Lenae. It was released on August 9, 2024, through Atlantic Records.

The first single showcased two tracks: "Love is Blind" and "Love Me Not"; the latter went viral in April 2025. Leading up to the album, "Dream Girl" with Ty Dolla Sign and "One Wish" featuring Childish Gambino were released. The album received acclaim from music critics.

== Background ==
Lenae created the record alongside executive producer DJ Dahi. In a statement, she described the album as a return "to a place of self-trust and unbending intuition" while taking "paths and turns" on the way there into consideration. Announcement of the album was accompanied by the release of the songs "Love Is Blind" and "Love Me Not" on May 3, 2024. Both songs observe "conflicting feelings of relational desire and dependency", "Love Is Blind" in a more "soul" and "airy R&B" approach and "Love Me Not" as "bolder crossover pop". The second single, "Dream Girl", featuring Ty Dolla Sign, was released on June 26 and contains what Lenae refers to as "Prince drums" as well as the singer's signature "potent world-building". The third single, "One Wish", features Childish Gambino, and was released in July.

Lenae went on a North American and European tour supporting the album, beginning on October 5, 2024.

== Critical reception ==
Professional ratings
Aggregate scores
Source	Rating
AnyDecentMusic?	7.4/10
Metacritic	83/100
Review scores
Source	Rating
AllMusic	4/5 stars
Exclaim!	8/10
The Line of Best Fit	8/10
NME	4/5 stars
The Observer	4/5 stars
Pitchfork	7.8/10

Bird's Eye received widespread acclaim from critics. At Metacritic, which assigns a normalized rating out of 100 to reviews from mainstream publications, the album received an average score of 83, based on 6 reviews. Aggregator AnyDecentMusic? rated Bird's Eye a 7.4 out of 10.

Writing for The Observer, Shaad D'Souza stated that "Bird's Eye, is the real deal: a breathtaking pop suite that's fleet-footed but rock-solid in its convictions, easily swaying between styles while always foregrounding Lenae's gossamer voice." Clover Hope of Pitchfork commented on Lenae's debut album, Hypnos, noting "While HYPNOS showcased the fluidity of R&B, Bird's Eye is more varied: Lenae experiments like she's an alchemist in an R&D lab, trialing new combinations of downtempo guitar, gentle reggae-pop, and even a stuttering, Brainfeeder-esque beat."

=== Year-end lists ===
Select year-end rankings for Bird's Eye
Publication/critic	Accolade	Rank	Ref.
Billboard	The 50 best albums of 2024	42	
The Line of Best Fit	The Best Albums of 2024	38	
The Fader	The 50 Best Albums of 2024	9	

== Track listing ==
Bird's Eye track listing
No.	Title	Lyrics	Music	Producer(s)	Length
1.	"Genius"	Ravyn Lenae; Sarah Aarons	Dacourey Natche; Steve Lacy; Spencer Stewart; Lenae^{[m]}; Aarons^{[m]}	Dahi; Stewart	2:35
2.	"Bad Idea"	Lenae; Aarons	Natche; Jason Pounds; Ricardo Bell; Johntá Austin; Jaron Alston; Ralph Tresvant; Jermaine Dupri; Lenae^{[m]}; Aarons^{[m]}	Dahi; J.Lbs	2:14
3.	"One Wish" (featuring Childish Gambino)	Lenae; Aarons; Donald Glover	Natche; Michael John Mulé; Isaac John de Boni; Ely Weisfeld; Margaux Alexis Roselena Whitney; Luiz Antonio Bizarro; Fortunato Arduini; Donald Glover; Lenae^{[m]}; Aarons^{[m]}	Dahi; FnZ; Ely Rise^{[a]}; Charly Cooks^{[a]}; Yuli Arias^{[a]}	3:15
4.	"Dream Girl" (with Ty Dolla Sign)	Aarons; Tyrone Griffin Jr.	Natche; Weisfeld; Stewart; Jimmy Jam; Terry Lewis; Lenae^{[m]}; Aarons^{[m]}	Dahi; Rise; Stewart; Lewis; Jimmy Jam^{[a]}	3:39
5.	"Candy"	Aarons	Natche; Weisfeld; Lenae^{[m]}; Aarons^{[m]}	Dahi; Rise	3:06
6.	"Love Is Blind"	Aarons	Natche; Jared Solomon; Stewart; Lenae^{[m]}; Aarons^{[m]}	Dahi; Stewart; Solomonophonic	3:51
7.	"Love Me Not"	Anderson .Paak; Lenae; Aarons	Natche; Brent Reynolds; Craig Balmoris; Julian Nixon; Stewart; Jaelen Irizarry; Christian Farlow; Dominic Angelella; Stewart; .Paak^{[m]}; Lenae^{[m]}; Aarons^{[m]}	Balmoris; Dahi; Ritz Reynolds; Stewart; Rise^{[a]}	3:33
8.	"From Scratch"	Hayley Gene Penner; Aarons	Natche; Pounds; Tobias Breuer; Stewart; Lenae^{[m]}; Aarons^{[m]}; Yonatan Ayal^{[m]}	Dahi; J.Lbs; Rascal; Stewart^{[a]}	3:25
9.	"1 of 1"	Lenae; Aarons	Natche; Lacy; Stewart; Lenae^{[m]}	Dahi; Stewart; Lacy	2:45
10.	"Pilot"	Lenae; Aarons; Penner	Natche; Daniel McKinnon; Weisfeld; Stewart; Lenae^{[m]}	Dahi; McKinnon; Stewart^{[a]}; Rise^{[a]}	3:13
11.	"Days"	Aarons; Lenae	Natche; Stewart; Weisfeld; Breuer; Lenae^{[m]}; Aarons^{[m]}	Dahi; Stewart; Cooks^{[a]}; Rise^{[a]}; Rascal^{[a]}	4:03
Total length:					35:39

Bird's Eye special LP edition bonus track
No.	Title	Lyrics	Music	Producer(s)	Length
12.	"Goodbye 2 You"	Lenae; Aarons	Natche; Stewart; Jonah Stevens; Alissia Benveniste	Dahi; Stewart; Stevens; Benveniste

Notes

- On physical releases, Childish Gambino and Ty Dolla Sign are not featured on "One Wish" and "Dream Girl", respectively.
- On physical releases, Terry Lewis is not credited as a writer or producer on "Dream Girl".
- ^{^[a]} signifies an additional producer.
- ^{^[m]} signifies a melody writer.

Sample credits

- "Bad Idea" contains an interpolation of "Like You", written by Ricardo Bell, Ralph Tresvant, Jermaine Dupri Jaron Alson, and Johntá Austin.
- "One Wish" contains an interpolation of "Estou Perdido No Meio Da Rua", written by Luiz Antonio Bizarro and Fortunato Arduini.

== Personnel ==
Musicians

- Ravyn Lenae – vocals
- Childish Gambino – vocals (track 3)
- Sara Kawai – harp (track 4)
- Ty Dolla Sign – vocals (track 4)
- Dominic Angelella – guitar (track 7)
- Jaelen Irizarry – background vocals (track 7)
- Christian Farlow – background vocals (track 7)

Technical

- Dale Becker – mastering
- Tyler Page – mixing (tracks 1–3, 9)
- Dahi – mixing (tracks 1–3, 9)
- Jon Castelli – mixing (tracks 4–8, 10–12)
- Bryan Schwaller – engineering
- Riley Mackin – engineering (track 3)
- Julian Nixon – additional arrangement (track 7)
- Brandon Hernandez – mastering assistance
- Noah McCorkle – mastering assistance

Visuals

- Kennedi Carter – photography
- Stephen Wordie – photo assistance
- Eddie Mandell – art direction, design

== Charts ==
=== Weekly charts ===
Weekly chart performance for Bird's Eye
Chart (2024–2025)	Peak position
Canadian Albums (Billboard)	89
French Albums (SNEP)	155
US Billboard 200	139
US Heatseekers Albums (Billboard)	9
US Top R&B/Hip-Hop Albums (Billboard)	38

=== Year-end charts ===
Year-end chart performance for Bird's Eye
Chart (2025)	Position
US Top R&B/Hip-Hop Albums (Billboard)	91
