= 100 Miles & Running =

Mixtape by Wale
- Released: July 11, 2007
- Genre: Alternative hip-hop
- Length: 71:53
- Producers: Aqua; Best Kept Secret; DJ Analyze; DJ Book; DJ Jealousy; Gerard Thomas & Demario Bridges for TeamMusicGroup; Hitterquitter Boyz; Judah; Mark Ronson

Wale chronology
100 Miles & Running (2007)	The Mixtape About Nothing (2008)

Professional ratings
Review scores
Source	Rating
*DJBooth.net	3.5/5 stars
*RapReviews	(8.5/10)

100 Miles & Running is the third official mixtape by Washington, D.C. rapper Wale. It was released on July 11, 2007. The mixtape was mixed by Nick Catchdubs and featured remixes of songs by Amy Winehouse, Lily Allen and Justice. The mixtape also includes appearances from Daniel Merriweather, Mark Ronson and Tabi Bonney. XXL Magazine gave the mixtape a positive review and called Wale "the thinking man's Lil' Wayne", while the Chicago Reader picked it as a staff favorite from 2007 and called "W.A.L.E.D.A.N.C.E.", Wale's remix of Justice's "D.A.N.C.E", "positively epic". Wale and Ronson performed the song at the 2007 MTV Video Music Awards and Wale later appeared on the cover of URB with Justice.

== Track listing ==
#	Title	Time	Featured guest(s)	Producer(s)
1	"Let's Ride"	3:45	Daniel Merriweather	Mark Ronson
2	"DC Gorillaz"	3:57	Gorillaz	Best Kept Secret
3	"Breakdown"	2:18		Hitterquitter Boyz
4	"Ice Cream Girl"	2:08		Best Kept Secret
5	"Tasty" (skit)	1:34		
6	"Payback"	3:18		
7	"Jay Joint"	2:33		Judah
8	"Please Listen"	3:20		Judah
9	"The People"	3:11		
10	"Daytona Squared"	5:23		Judah
11	"Bonified"	1:49	Tabi Bonney	DJ Book, DJ Jealousy
12	"W.A.L.E.D.A.N.C.E"	3:49	Justice	
13	"Good Girls"	3:08		Gerard Thomas & Demario Bridges for TeamMusicGroup
14	"Work"	3:50		
15	"Warming Up Cane"	3:07		
16	"Smile" (Remix)	4:02	Lily Allen	Mark Ronson
17	"Camp Lo"	5:03		
18	"Nobody"	4:54		DJ Analyze
19	"Rehab"	5:38	Amy Winehouse	
20	"Rediscover Me"	5:18		Aqua
