= The Mixtape About Nothing =

Mixtape by Wale
- Released: May 30, 2008
- Genre: Alternative hip-hop
- Length: 72:33
- Label: 10.Deep
- Producers: Best Kept Secret; Eli Escobar; J Dilla; James Poyser; Mark Ronson; Osinachi; Questlove; Scott Storch; Scottie B; Sean C & LV

Wale chronology
100 Miles & Running (2007)	The Mixtape About Nothing (2008)	Attention Deficit (2009)

The Mixtape About Nothing is the fourth mixtape by American rapper Wale, released on May 30, 2008. It was mixed by Nick Catchdubs, and released as a collaboration with New York streetwear brand 10.Deep Clothing as a free download.

== Theme ==
Wale was inspired by the show Seinfeld. Wale claims he has "seen every episode". The mixtape samples extensively from Seinfeld, and Wale peppers his raps with frequent reference to jokes and catch phrases from the series. Each track follows the series' naming conventions for episodes, formatting each title with the definitive article "The". In the track "The Kramer," Wale raps about use of the word "nigger," referring to the Michael Richards Laugh Factory incident, which Wale also attacks across the rest of the mixtape. Actress Julia Louis-Dreyfus, who plays the character Elaine Benes in Seinfeld, appears on the mixtape. In 2015, Wale collaborated with Jerry Seinfeld on an album called The Album About Nothing.

== Critical reception ==
Professional ratings
Review scores
Source	Rating
Robert Christgau	(3-star Honorable Mention)
Pitchfork	(8.4/10)
PopMatters	8/10 discs
RapReviews	(8.5/10)
The Skinny	4/5 stars
Slant Magazine	4/5 stars

Upon its release, The Mixtape About Nothing has received favorable reviews from music critics. Arthur Gailes of RapReviews.com gave the album an 8.5 out of 10.

== Track listing ==
From "The Mixtape About Nothing".

#	Song	Time	Featured guest(s)	Producer(s)
1	"The Opening Title Sequence"	2:43		Best Kept Secret
2	"The Roots Song Wale Is On"	1:37	The Roots, Chrisette Michele	Questlove, James Poyser
3	"The Feature Heavy Song"	3:37	Bun B, Pusha T, Tre	Best Kept Secret
4	"The Freestyle (Roc Boys)"	4:12		Sean C & LV
5	"The Perfect Plan"	2:53		Best Kept Secret
6	"The Kramer"	4:14		Best Kept Secret
7	"The Crazy"	3:04		Best Kept Secret
8	"The Vacation from Ourselves"	4:21	Julia Louis-Dreyfus	Best Kept Secret
9	"The Remake of a Remake (All I Need)"	3:00	Tawiah	Mark Ronson
10	"The Grown Up"	4:08		Best Kept Secret
11	"The Manipulation"	4:16		Best Kept Secret
12	"The Artistic Integrity"	3:22		Best Kept Secret
13	"The Star"	5:53		J Dilla, Questlove, Scott Storch
14	"The Skit (Untz Untz)"	2:21		
15	"The Cliche Lil Wayne Feature (It's the Remix Baby!)"	3:59	Lil Wayne	Osinachi
16	"The Bmore Club Slam"	3:59		Scottie B
17	"The Chicago Falcon (Remix)"	3:09	The Budos Band	Mark Ronson, Eli Escobar
18	"The Hype"	5:53		Best Kept Secret
19	"The End Credits"	5:54		Best Kept Secret
