= Love Me Not (Ravyn Lenae song) =

2024 single by Ravyn Lenae

Single by Ravyn Lenae

from the album Bird's Eye
- Released: May 3, 2024
- Recorded: 2023–2024
- Genre: Soft rock; art pop; R&B
- Length: 3:33
- Label: Atlantic
- Songwriters: Ravyn Lenae; Brandon Anderson; Sarah Aarons; Dacourey Natche; Brent Reynolds; Craig Balmoris; Julian Nixon; Spencer Stewart; Jaelen Irizarry; Christian Farlow; Dominic Angelella
- Producers: Balmoris; DJ Dahi; Ritz Reynolds; Stewart; Ely Rise

Ravyn Lenae singles chronology
"Xtasy (Remix)" (2022)	"Love Me Not" / "Love Is Blind" (2024)	"Dream Girl" (2024)

Music video
- "Love Me Not" on YouTube

Audio sample
- file; help

"Love Me Not" is a song by American singer-songwriter Ravyn Lenae, released on May 3, 2024, as the lead single (alongside the song "Love Is Blind") from her second studio album Bird's Eye (2024). "Love Me Not" went viral on the video-sharing app TikTok in late 2024, after which it became her breakout and peaked at number 5 on the Billboard Hot 100. Outside of the United States, "Love Me Not" peaked within the top five of the charts in Australia, Belgium, Ireland, Latvia, New Zealand, and the United Kingdom, and the top ten of the charts in Austria, Lithuania, the Netherlands, and Switzerland.

== Composition and lyrics ==
In regard to style, "Love Me Not" has been described as R&B, "soul-rock", indie rock, grungy, and "retro pop". The song finds Ravyn Lenae considering her romantic desires and whether to commit to an uncertain relationship. She explores the duality of needing her partner and also wanting to be independent. In the chorus, Lenae sings with dreamy vocals on top of drums, "Oh no, I don't need you, but I miss you, come here". It also seems to reference the French flower game "He loves me...He loves me not."

== Critical reception ==
Marcos Sanoja of Under the Radar gave a positive review, writing "It is a poignant exploration of love and its complexities in which Lenae dives into heartache and self-discovery, and themes such as longing and uncertainty. Sonically, it is very different from anything she has released before, but it works perfectly, delivering what might be the best R&B song of the year yet. It is fun and at the same time heartbreaking and relatable."

== Remix ==
An official remix of the song featuring British singer Rex Orange County was released on October 8, 2024.

== Promotion ==
"Love Me Not" rose in popularity on TikTok when a user named "thatsode" released a mashup of the song and "Losing You" by Solange on October 11, 2024. The song slowly gained momentum on TikTok for the rest of 2024, with the increasing use of the mashup in videos, and gained much more recognition by January 2025. The original song soundtracked over 320,000 clips on the platform by the second week of April 2025.

== Charts ==
=== Weekly charts ===
Weekly chart performance for "Love Me Not"
Chart (2025–2026)	Peak position
Australia (ARIA)	2
Australia Hip Hop/R&B (ARIA)	1
Austria (Ö3 Austria Top 40)	6
Austria Airplay (IFPI)	32
Belgium (Ultratop 50 Flanders)	4
Belgium (Ultratop 50 Wallonia)	3
Canada (Canadian Hot 100)	7
Canada All-Format Airplay (Billboard)	9
Canada AC (Billboard)	25
Canada CHR/Top 40 (Billboard)	5
Canada Hot AC (Billboard)	4
Colombia Anglo Airplay (Monitor Latino)	10
CIS Airplay (TopHit)	35
Croatia International Airplay (Top lista)	10
Czech Republic Airplay (ČNS IFPI)	86
Czech Republic Singles Digital (ČNS IFPI)	30
Denmark Airplay (Tracklisten)	6
Estonia Airplay (TopHit)	11
Finland Airplay (Radiosoittolista)	21
France (SNEP)	34
France Airplay (SNEP)	31
Germany (GfK)	12
Germany Airplay (MusicTrace)	19
Global 200 (Billboard)	7
Greece International (IFPI)	24
Hungary (Editors' Choice Top 40)	27
Hungary (Single Top 40)	38
Iceland (Tónlistinn)	26
India International (IMI)	2
Ireland (IRMA)	3
Israel (Mako Hitlist)	80
Italy Airplay (EarOne)	38
Latvia Airplay (LaIPA)	3
Latvia Streaming (LaIPA)	6
Lithuania (AGATA)	6
Lithuania Airplay (TopHit)	4
Luxembourg (Billboard)	5
Malaysia (Billboard)	11
Malaysia International (RIM)	13
Malta Airplay (Radiomonitor)	7
Moldova Airplay (TopHit)	82
Netherlands (Dutch Top 40)	7
Netherlands (Single Top 100)	9
Netherlands Airplay (Dutch Charts)	17
New Zealand (Recorded Music NZ)	2
Nigeria (TurnTable Top 100)	85
Nigeria International (TurnTable)	12
North Macedonia Airplay (Radiomonitor)	6
Norway (VG-lista)	14
Norway Airplay (IFPI) version featuring Rex Orange County	31
Philippines Hot 100 (Billboard Philippines)	23
Poland Airplay (OLiS)	14
Poland Streaming (OLiS)	26
Portugal (AFP)	48
Russia Airplay (TopHit)	32
San Marino Airplay (SMRTV Top 50)	33
Serbia Airplay (Radiomonitor)	13
Singapore (RIAS)	11
Slovakia Airplay (ČNS IFPI)	5
Slovakia Singles Digital (ČNS IFPI)	38
Slovenia Airplay (Radiomonitor)	11
Spain Airplay (Promusicae)	5
South Africa Airplay (TOSAC)	24
South Africa Streaming (TOSAC)	41
Sweden (Sverigetopplistan)	18
Switzerland (Schweizer Hitparade)	6
Switzerland Airplay (MusicTrace)	16
Turkey International Airplay (Radiomonitor Türkiye)	3
United Arab Emirates (IFPI)	15
UK Singles (Official Charts)	2
US Billboard Hot 100	5
US Adult Contemporary (Billboard)	21
US Adult Pop Airplay (Billboard)	4
US Pop Airplay (Billboard)	2
US Rhythmic (Billboard)	7

=== Monthly charts ===
Monthly chart performance for "Love Me Not"
Chart (2025–2026)	Peak position
CIS Airplay (TopHit)	41
Estonia Airplay (TopHit)	15
Lithuania Airplay (TopHit)	4
Moldova Airplay (TopHit)	95
Russia Airplay (TopHit)	46

=== Year-end charts ===
Year-end chart performance for "Love Me Not"
Chart (2025)	Position
Australia (ARIA)	11
Austria (Ö3 Austria Top 40)	21
Belgium (Ultratop 50 Flanders)	15
Belgium (Ultratop 50 Wallonia)	20
Canada (Canadian Hot 100)	27
Canada AC (Billboard)	68
Canada CHR/Top 40 (Billboard)	23
Canada Hot AC (Billboard)	43
CIS Airplay (TopHit)	194
Estonia Airplay (TopHit)	55
France (SNEP)	80
Germany (GfK)	31
Global 200 (Billboard)	56
Hungary (Single Top 40)	79
Iceland (Tónlistinn)	16
Lithuania Airplay (TopHit)	10
Netherlands (Dutch Top 40)	16
Netherlands (Single Top 100)	20
New Zealand (Recorded Music NZ)	8
Philippines (Philippines Hot 100)	65
Poland (Polish Streaming Top 100)	70
Sweden (Sverigetopplistan)	47
Switzerland (Schweizer Hitparade)	25
UK Singles (OCC)	8
US Billboard Hot 100	30
US Adult Pop Airplay (Billboard)	22
US Pop Airplay (Billboard)	15
US Rhythmic Airplay (Billboard)	38

== Certifications ==
Certifications for "Love Me Not"
Region	Certification	Certified units/sales
Australia (ARIA)	6× Platinum	420,000^{‡}
Austria (IFPI Austria)	2× Platinum	60,000^{‡}
Canada (Music Canada)	5× Platinum	400,000^{‡}
Denmark (IFPI Danmark)	Platinum	90,000^{‡}
France (SNEP)	Diamond	333,333^{‡}
Germany (BVMI)	Gold	300,000^{‡}
Italy (FIMI)	Gold	100,000^{‡}
New Zealand (RMNZ) Remix version	4× Platinum	120,000^{‡}
Poland (ZPAV)	Platinum	125,000^{‡}
Portugal (AFP)	2× Platinum	50,000^{‡}
Spain (Promusicae)	Platinum	100,000^{‡}
United Kingdom (BPI)	2× Platinum	1,200,000^{‡}
Streaming
Czech Republic (ČNS IFPI)	Platinum	5,000,000^{†}
Greece (IFPI Greece)	Platinum	2,000,000^{†}
Slovakia (ČNS IFPI)	Platinum	1,700,000^{†}
^{‡} Sales+streaming figures based on certification alone.^{†} Streaming-only figures based on certification alone.

== Release history ==
Release history for "Love Me Not"
Region	Date	Format(s)	Label(s)	Ref.
United States	April 15, 2025	Contemporary hit radio	Atlantic	
