= Ravyn Lenae =

American singer (born 1999)

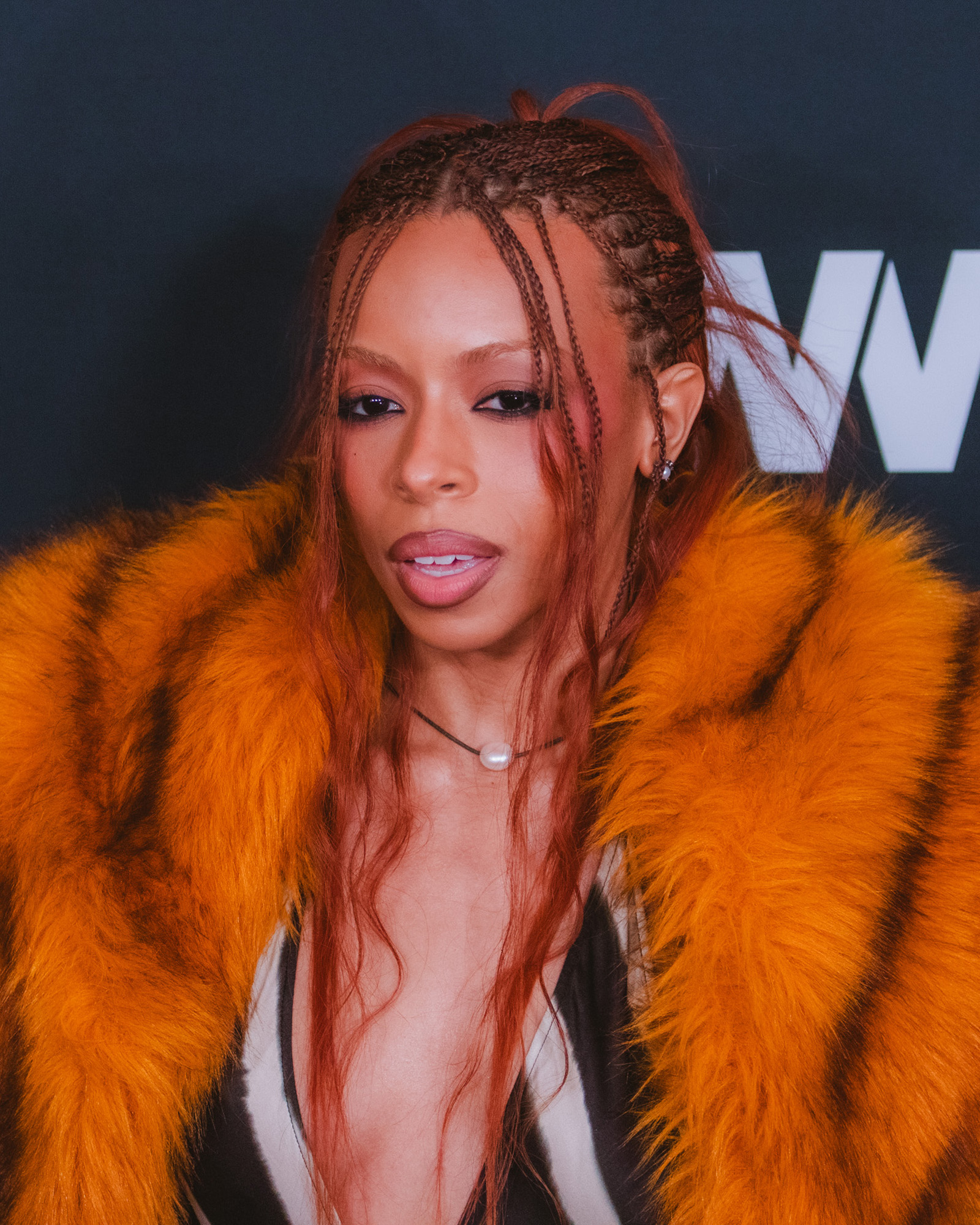
- Lenae in 2026

Background information
- Born: Ravyn Lenae Washington; January 22, 1999 (age 27); Blue Island, Illinois, U.S.
- Genres: Alternative R&B; R&B; neo soul
- Occupations: Singer; songwriter
- Instrument: Vocals
- Years active: 2014–present
- Labels: Atlantic; Three Twenty Three
- Member of: Zero Fatigue
- Website: ravynlenae.com

Ravyn Lenae Washington (born January 22, 1999) is an American singer and songwriter from Chicago, currently signed to Atlantic Records and the Three Twenty Three Music Group. She is also a member of the musical collective Zero Fatigue. Her debut EP, Moon Shoes, was released independently in 2015 and later reissued by Atlantic Records in 2016. Her follow-up EP, Midnight Moonlight, was released in 2017. She has performed at several music festivals and in 2017 toured with SZA on her Ctrl Tour and Noname on her Telefone Tour. Her discography blends elements of "R&B, pop, dance, rock, Afrobeats and reggae", according to Billboard.

She released her debut album, Hypnos, on May 20, 2022, and her second album, Bird's Eye, on August 9, 2024, to critical acclaim. The latter spawned her breakout hit, "Love Me Not", which peaked at number 5 on the Billboard Hot 100 and peaked within the top 50 of the music charts in several countries. Her third album, Blue Island, was released on August 7, 2026.

== Early life and education ==
Ravyn Lenae Washington was born on January 22, 1999, in Chicago. Her mother is from Panama, with her maternal grandfather being part of a doo wop musical group in the country. She was raised as a member of the Pullman Christian Reformed Church on the far South Side of the city. Her maternal grandfather, Richard Williams, served as the pastor of the congregation for 30 years. She credits her participation in worship at the church with helping to develop her interests and abilities in music. In middle school at Roseland Christian School, Lenae began writing her own songs. She attended the Chicago High School for the Arts, where she studied classical music. She graduated from the school in May 2017 at the age of 18.

== Musical career ==
As a sophomore in high school, Lenae spent $300 on a studio session that would ultimately produce her first single, "Greetings". Soon after, in 2015, she was featured on Monte Booker's song "Baby". Booker and Lenae along with rapper Smino formed the original core of the music collective Zero Fatigue, which was brought together by Chris "Classick" Innumerable at his recording studio, Classick Studios. Lenae's first EP, Moon Shoes, was originally released as a free download in August 2015, but was reissued by Atlantic Records and the Three Twenty Three Music Group in 2016. It drew praise from critics for her "fluid vocals and spare, poetic lyrics."

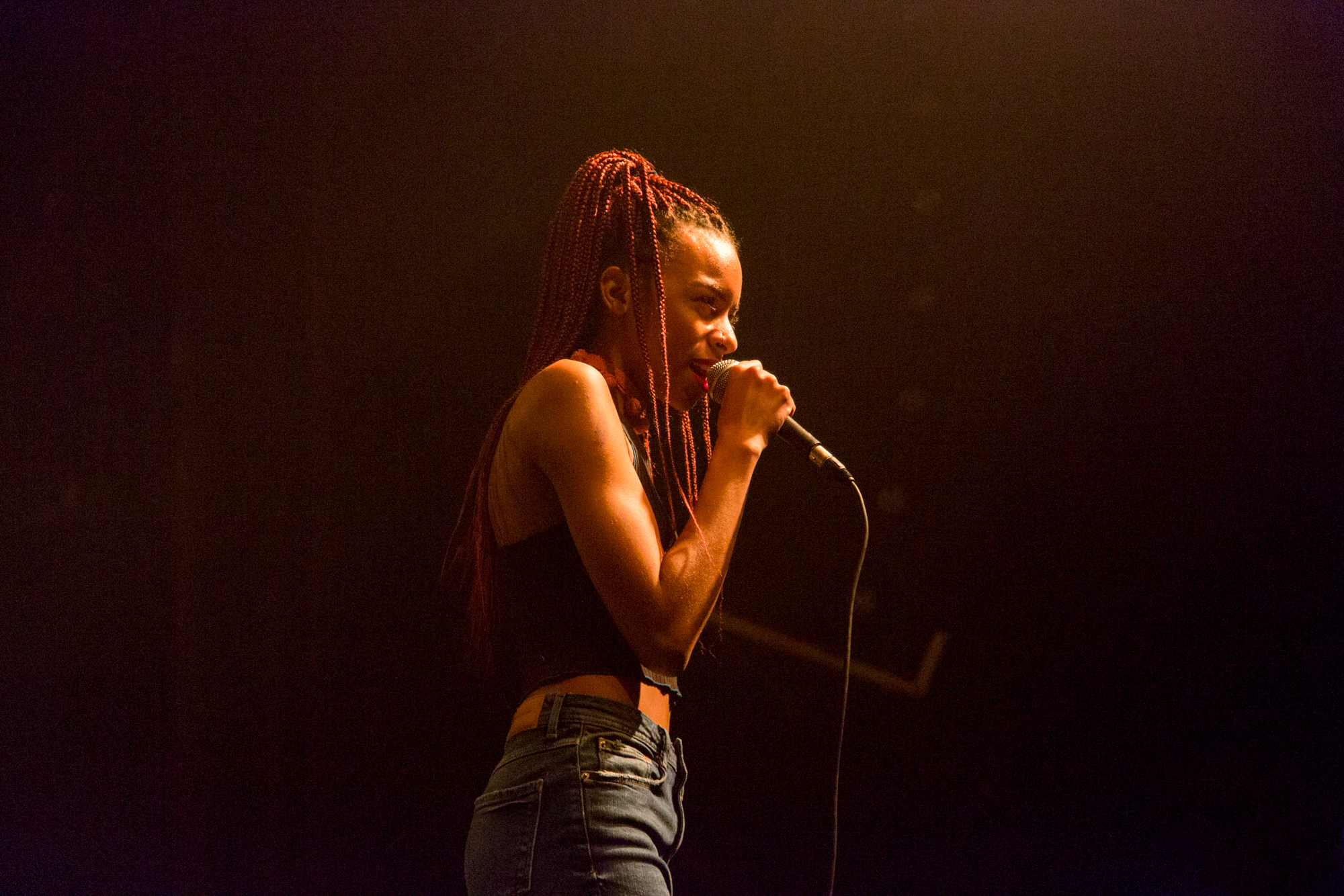
Ravyn Lenae performing as part of the Telefone Tour on March 5, 2017

In 2016, Lenae was signed to Atlantic Records. She also appeared as a featured performer on Mick Jenkins' album The Healing Component and on Noname's song "Forever". She opened for Noname on her Telefone Tour from January to March 2017. Lenae also performed at WBEZ's Winter Block Party alongside fellow members of the underground collective Medicine Woman: Drea Smith, Via Rosa, and Jean Deaux.

She released her second EP, Midnight Moonlight, on March 3, 2017. Later that month, she performed at SXSW, was featured on Smino's "Glass Flows," and was listed by Rolling Stone as one of "10 New Artists You Need to Know." In the following three months, she performed at several other festivals, including Mamby on the Beach in Chicago's Bronzeville neighborhood and Culture Shock in Purchase, New York. Beginning in August 2017, Lenae opened for SZA on her Ctrl the Tour. The tour ended in December 2017. On February 9, she released her third EP, entirely produced by Steve Lacy, titled Crush.

On February 1, 2022, she released "Skin Tight" with Steve Lacy, the first single of her debut album, Hypnos. She subsequently released her debut album on May 20, 2022, which featured vocals and production from Monte Booker, Steve Lacy, Kaytranada, Fousheé, Mereba, Smino, Sango, Luke Titus, IAmNobodi, Phoelix and Teo Halm. She announced a tour spanning 16 cities beginning at Neumos in Seattle, Washington, with special guest Unusual Demont opening for some concerts on the tour.

Lenae released singles "Love Me Not" and "Love Is Blind" on May 3, 2024. These releases were the first of four songs released in the lead-up to her second album, Bird's Eye, with "Dream Girl" with Ty Dolla Sign and "One Wish" featuring Childish Gambino following soon after.

On August 9, 2024, Lenae released her sophomore album, Bird's Eye, through Atlantic Records. Working closely with executive producer Dahi, Lenae expanded her sound beyond the R&B roots of her debut album. This project embraces elements of downtempo guitar, reggae-pop, and experimental production while still retaining Lenae's trademark soprano vocal presence.

The album's lead single, "Love Me Not", had a resurgence in popularity in early 2025 after a user-generated mash-up featuring Solange's "Losing You" went viral on TikTok. The track entered the Billboard Hot 100 at No. 81 in April and subsequently climbed into the Top 10.

The single's momentum pushed Lenae to embark on a headline tour during the fall of 2025, where she performed across the U.S., U.K., and Europe, with festival appearances such as Coachella. This phase of her career is described as a breakout moment, marking her transition from underground darling to broader mainstream recognition.

On February 27, 2025, Lenae announced that she would be joining artists Olivia Dean and Amber Mark on an extra leg of Sabrina Carpenter's Short n' Sweet Tour. This coincided with the viral success of "Love Me Not" in early 2025, which became Lenae's Billboard Hot 100 chart entry on April 12. That month, she also appeared at Coachella 2025.

On April 3, 2026, she released two songs: "Bobby" and "Reputation", the latter of which features American singer Dominic Fike. Her album Blue Island was released on August 7, 2026. She is scheduled to embark on a North American tour in support of the album beginning on September 15, 2026 in Sacramento and concluding on October 21, 2026 in Los Angeles. Lexa Gates, Nourished by Time, and Q will open for the tour.

== Artistry ==
In Jeune Afrique, Eva Sauphie described Lenae as a "cross between Kelela, an Azealia Banks dipped in honey and a teen spirit version Kelis," combining genres including "nu soul, electro-jazz, chamber pop, and ambient hip-hop." The Austin American-Statesman described her style as "a watercolor R&B platter with startling depth." Lenae has mentioned OutKast, Janet Jackson, Timbaland, Brandy, India.Arie, and Erykah Badu among her musical influences. Writing for Pitchfork, Ryan Dombal reviewed Lenae's performance on Monte Booker's "Baby" as "channel[ing] both Billie [Holiday] and Erykah [Badu] on the acoustic-guitar ballad, which crackles like Lauryn Hill's Unplugged as remixed by the ghost of J Dilla."

Comparing Lenae's two EPs, Mosi Reeves of Rolling Stone said Midnight Moonlight "delves into more romantic concerns with the same quiet grace" first heard on Moon Shoes in which she "sings about life as a dreamy, sometimes-melancholy teenager in a softly assertive voice." Marcus J. Moore's Pitchfork review of Midnight Moonlight noted that it "carries a methodical late-night vibe suitable for Quiet Storm radio" particularly when compared to the "far brighter" energy on Moon Shoes.

== Discography ==
=== Studio albums ===
List of studio albums with selected details and chart positions
Title	Album details	Peak chart positions				
Title	Album details	US	US R&B /HH	AUS	CAN	FRA
Hypnos	Released: May 20, 2022; Label: Atlantic; Format: CD, LP, digital download, streaming	—	—	—	—	—
Bird's Eye	Released: August 9, 2024; Label: Atlantic; Format: CD, LP, digital download, streaming	139	38	—	89	155
Blue Island	Released: August 7, 2026; Label: Atlantic; Format: CD, LP, digital download, streaming	—	—	95	—	—

=== Extended plays ===
List of extended plays with selected details
Title	EP details
Moon Shoes	Released: July 29, 2016; Label: Atlantic, 323 Music Group; Format: Digital download
Midnight Moonlight	Released: March 3, 2017; Label: Atlantic, 323 Music Group; Format: Digital download
Crush	Released: February 9, 2018; Label: Atlantic, 323 Music Group; Format: Digital download

=== Singles ===
List of singles, with selected chart positions and certifications, showing year released and album name
Title	Year	Peak chart positions										Certifications	Album
Title	Year	US	AUS	AUT	CAN	IRE	NLD	NZ	SWE	UK	WW	Certifications	Album
"Love Me Not"	2024	5	2	6	7	3	9	2	18	2	7	ARIA: 6× Platinum; BPI: 2× Platinum; IFPI AUT: 2× Platinum; MC: 5× Platinum; RMNZ: 4× Platinum	Bird's Eye
"One Wish" (featuring Childish Gambino)	2024	—	—	—	—	—	—	— (Note: "One Wish" did not enter the NZ Top 40 Singles Chart, but peaked at number 19 on the NZ Hot Singles Chart.)	—	—	—		Bird's Eye
"Is It Real?" (with Flume and JPEGMafia)	2025	—	—	—	—	—	—	— (Note: "Is It Real?" did not enter the NZ Top 40 Singles Chart, but peaked at number 10 on the NZ Hot Singles Chart.)	—	—	—		We Live in a Society
"O Holy Night"	2025	— (Note: "O Holy Night" did not enter the Billboard Hot 100, but peaked at number 4 on the Bubbling Under Hot 100 chart.)	—	—	65	56	—	— (Note: "O Holy Night" did not enter the NZ Top 40 Singles Chart, but peaked at number 2 on the NZ Hot Singles Chart.)	—	99	—		Non-album singles
"Reputation" (featuring Dominic Fike)	2026	—	—	—	—	—	—	— (Note: "Reputation" did not enter the NZ Top 40 Singles Chart, but peaked at number 6 on the NZ Hot Singles Chart.)	—	—	—		Blue Island
"Bobby"	2026	—	—	—	—	—	—	—	—	—	—		Blue Island
"Handle"	2026	—	—	—	—	—	—	—	—	—	—		Blue Island
"Saturday Night"	2026	—	—	—	—	—	—	—	—	—	—		Blue Island
"—" denotes a recording that did not chart or was not released in that territory.

=== Other charted songs ===
List of other charted songs, with selected chart positions, showing year released and album name
Title	Year	Peak chart positions	Album
Title	Year	NZ Hot	Album
"In & Out"	2026	32	Blue Island

== Tours ==
=== Headlining ===
- Bird's Eye Live Tour (2024)
- Blue Island Tour (2026)

=== Opening act ===
- SZA - Ctrl the Tour (2017)
- Omar Apollo - The Prototype Tour (2022)
- Reneé Rapp - Bite Me Tour (2025)
- Sabrina Carpenter - Short n' Sweet Tour (2025)

== Awards and nominations ==
Year	Organization	Award	Nominated work	Result	Ref.
2025	Billboard R&B/Hip-Hop Power Players	R&B Rookie of the Year	Herself	Won	
2025	Femme It Forward Give Her FlowHERS Awards	Fem Z Award	Herself	Honored	
2025	MTV Video Music Awards	Song of Summer	"Love Me Not"	Nominated	
2026	Brit Awards	International Song	"Love Me Not"	Nominated	
2026	NAACP Image Awards	Outstanding New Artist	Herself	Nominated	
2026	iHeartRadio Music Awards	Best New Pop Artist	Herself	Nominated	
