= Igor Tour =

2019 concert tour by Tyler the Creator

- Tour by Tyler, the Creator
- Associated album: Igor
- Start date: August 30, 2019
- End date: October 26, 2019 (Note: Intended to conclude on July 5, 2020; the remainder of the tour was cancelled due to the COVID-19 pandemic.)
- Legs: 1
- No. of shows: 34
- Supporting acts: Jaden Smith; GoldLink; Blood Orange

Tyler, the Creator concert chronology
- Flower Boy Tour (2018); Igor Tour (2019); Call Me If You Get Lost Tour (2022)

The Igor Tour (often stylized as IGOR TOOR) was the fifth headlining concert tour by American rapper and producer Tyler, the Creator, in support of his sixth album Igor. Jaden Smith, GoldLink, and Blood Orange opened the tour.

== Background ==
Tyler the Creator announced his sixth full-length album, Igor, in 2019. He announced a North American tour in support of the album a month later. The European dates of the tour, which were to happen from June to July of 2020 were cancelled due to the COVID-19 pandemic.

== Setlist ==
This set list is for the show in Fresno, California on October 12, 2019. It is not intended to represent all concerts for the tour.

1. "Igor's Theme"
2. "I Think"
3. "A Boy Is a Gun"
4. "New Magic Wand"
5. "Puppet"
6. "Earfquake"
7. "911"
8. "IFHY"
9. "Gone, Gone"
10. "Okra"
11. "Tamale"
12. "Yonkers"
13. "She"
14. "Who Dat Boy"
15. "Boredom"
16. "Running Out of Time"
17. "What's Good"
18. "See You Again"
19. "Are We Still Friends?"

== Tour dates ==
List of concerts, showing date, city, country, venue, attendance, and revenue
| Date | City | Country | Venue | Opening acts |
|---|---|---|---|---|
| August 30, 2019 | Seattle (Note: This concert is part of Bumbershoot.) | United States | Seattle Center | —N/a |
| September 2, 2019 | Minneapolis | United States | Minneapolis Armory | Jaden Smith; GoldLink |
| September 4, 2019 | Chicago | United States | Credit Union 1 Arena | Jaden Smith; GoldLink |
| September 6, 2019 | Toronto | Canada | Scotiabank Arena | Jaden Smith; GoldLink |
| September 7, 2019 | Detroit | United States | Detroit Masonic Temple | Jaden Smith; GoldLink |
| September 10, 2019 | Boston | United States | Agganis Arena | Jaden Smith; GoldLink |
| September 11, 2019 | Laval | Canada | Place Bell | Jaden Smith; GoldLink |
| September 12, 2019 | New York | United States | Madison Square Garden | Jaden Smith; GoldLink |
| September 16, 2019 | London | England | Brixton Academy | Jaden Smith; GoldLink |
| September 17, 2019 | London | England | Brixton Academy | Jaden Smith; GoldLink |
| September 18, 2019 | London | England | Brixton Academy | Jaden Smith; GoldLink |
| September 21, 2019 | Columbia | United States | Merriweather Post Pavilion | Jaden Smith; GoldLink |
| September 22, 2019 | Columbus | United States | Express Live! Outside Stage | Jaden Smith; GoldLink |
| September 24, 2019 | Pittsburgh | United States | Stage AE | Jaden Smith; GoldLink |
| September 25, 2019 | Philadelphia | United States | Skyline Stage at the Mann | Jaden Smith; GoldLink |
| September 27, 2019 | Orlando | United States | Addition Financial Arena | Jaden Smith; GoldLink |
| September 28, 2019 | Tampa | United States | Yuengling Center | Jaden Smith; GoldLink |
| September 29, 2019 | Miami | United States | American Airlines Arena | Jaden Smith; GoldLink |
| October 1, 2019 | Greensboro | United States | Greensboro Coliseum Complex | Jaden Smith; GoldLink; Blood Orange |
| October 3, 2019 | Atlanta | United States | State Farm Arena | Jaden Smith; GoldLink; Blood Orange |
| October 4, 2019 | St. Louis | United States | Chaifetz Arena | Jaden Smith; GoldLink; Blood Orange |
| October 5, 2019 | Kansas City | United States | Silverstein Eye Centers Arena | Jaden Smith; GoldLink; Blood Orange |
| October 7, 2019 | Morrison | United States | Red Rocks Amphitheatre | Jaden Smith; GoldLink; Blood Orange |
| October 8, 2019 | Salt Lake City | United States | The Great Saltair | Jaden Smith; GoldLink; Blood Orange |
| October 10, 2019 | San Francisco | United States | Bill Graham Civic Auditorium | Jaden Smith; GoldLink; Blood Orange |
| October 12, 2019 | Fresno | United States | Selland Arena | Jaden Smith; GoldLink; Blood Orange |
| October 14, 2019 | Portland | United States | Veterans Memorial Coliseum | Jaden Smith; GoldLink; Blood Orange |
| October 15, 2019 | Vancouver | Canada | Pacific Coliseum | Jaden Smith; GoldLink; Blood Orange |
| October 17, 2019 | Reno | United States | Reno Events Center | Jaden Smith; GoldLink; Blood Orange |
| October 19, 2019 | San Diego | United States | Pechanga Arena | Jaden Smith; GoldLink; Blood Orange |
| October 20, 2019 | Glendale | United States | Gila River Arena | Jaden Smith; GoldLink; Blood Orange |
| October 22, 2019 | Austin | United States | Frank Erwin Center | Jaden Smith; GoldLink; Blood Orange |
| October 23, 2019 | Dallas | United States | The Theatre at Grand Prairie | Jaden Smith; GoldLink; Blood Orange |
| October 26, 2019 | Houston | United States | NRG Arena | Jaden Smith; GoldLink; Blood Orange |

=== Cancelled shows ===
List of cancelled concerts, showing date, city, country, venue, reason for cancellation and reference
| Date | City | Country | Venue | Reason | Ref. |
|---|---|---|---|---|---|
| March 21, 2020 (Note: Part of BUKU Music + Art Project.) | New Orleans | United States | Mardi Gras World | COVID-19 pandemic | |
| April 25, 2020 (Note: Part of Something in the Water Festival.) | Virginia Beach | United States | Virginia Beach Oceanfront | COVID-19 pandemic | |
| June 3, 2020 | Paris | France | Zénith Paris | COVID-19 pandemic | |
| June 5, 2020 (Note: Part of Orange Warsaw Festival.) | Warsaw | Poland | Służewiec Racing Track | COVID-19 pandemic | |
| June 6, 2020 (Note: Part of Primavera Sound.) | Barcelona | Spain | Parc del Fòrum | COVID-19 pandemic | |
| June 8, 2020 | Amsterdam | Netherlands | AFAS Live | COVID-19 pandemic | |
| June 11, 2020 | Porto | Portugal | Parque da Cidade | COVID-19 pandemic | |
| June 13, 2020 (Note: Part of Parklife.) | Manchester | England | Heaton Park | COVID-19 pandemic | |
| June 14, 2020 (Note: Part of Lovebox Festival.) | London | England | Gunnersbury Park | COVID-19 pandemic | |
| July 3, 2020 (Note: Part of Roskilde Festival.) | Roskilde | Denmark | Dyrskuepladsen | COVID-19 pandemic | |
| July 4, 2020 (Note: Part of Longitude Festival.) | Dublin | Ireland | Marlay Park | COVID-19 pandemic | |
| July 5, 2020 (Note: Part of Down the Rabbit Hole.) | Ewijk | Netherlands | Groene Heuvels | COVID-19 pandemic | |
