= Call Me If You Get Lost Tour =

2022 concert tour by Tyler, the Creator

- Tour by Tyler, the Creator
- Associated album: Call Me If You Get Lost
- Start date: February 10, 2022
- End date: August 3, 2022
- Legs: 3
- No. of shows: 54
- Supporting acts: Kali Uchis; Vince Staples; Teezo Touchdown; Tierra Whack

Tyler, the Creator concert chronology
- Igor Tour (2019); Call Me If You Get Lost Tour (2022); Chromakopia: The World Tour (2025)

The Call Me If You Get Lost Tour was the sixth headlining concert tour by American rapper and producer Tyler, the Creator in support of his album Call Me If You Get Lost. It began on February 10, 2022, at Pechanga Arena in San Diego and concluded on August 3, 2022, at the Rod Laver Arena in Melbourne. The tour was supported by Kali Uchis, Vince Staples, and Teezo Touchdown, with Tierra Whack opening for the Oceanian tour leg.

== Background ==
On August 3, 2021, Tyler announced the tour, a 35-date trek on his respective social media platforms, along with announcing the support acts, Kali Uchis, Vince Staples, and Teezo Touchdown, respectively. On August 6, tickets for the tour officially went on sale, with an "artist pre-sale" held by Tyler himself via Ticketmaster a day prior.

In 2022, Tyler extended the tour to Europe, Australia, and New Zealand.

== Set list ==
This set list is representative of the show in Chicago, Illinois on February 22, 2022. It is not representative of all concerts for the duration of the tour.

1. "Sir Baudelaire"
2. "Corso"
3. "Lemonhead"
4. "Hot Wind Blows"
5. "Lumberjack"
6. "Massa"
7. "WusYaName"
8. "Boredom"
9. "911"
10. "See You Again"
11. "IFHY"
12. "She"
13. "Smuckers"
14. "Yonkers"
15. "Bimmer"
16. "Rusty"
17. "Tamale"
18. "I Thought You Wanted to Dance"
19. "Who Dat Boy"
20. "I Think"
21. "Earfquake"
22. "New Magic Wand"
23. "RunItUp"

== Tour dates ==
List of concerts, showing date, city, country, venue, attendance, and revenue
Date	City	Country	Venue	Opening acts
February 10, 2022	San Diego	United States	Pechanga Arena	Kali Uchis; Vince Staples; Teezo Touchdown
February 11, 2022	Phoenix	United States	Footprint Center	Kali Uchis; Vince Staples; Teezo Touchdown
February 12, 2022	Las Vegas	United States	Michelob Ultra Arena	Kali Uchis; Vince Staples; Teezo Touchdown
February 14, 2022	El Paso	United States	Don Haskins Center	Kali Uchis; Vince Staples; Teezo Touchdown
February 16, 2022	Dallas	United States	American Airlines Center	Kali Uchis; Vince Staples; Teezo Touchdown
February 18, 2022	St. Louis	United States	Chaifetz Arena	Kali Uchis; Vince Staples; Teezo Touchdown
February 19, 2022	Independence	United States	Cable Dahmer Arena	Kali Uchis; Vince Staples; Teezo Touchdown
February 20, 2022	Minneapolis	United States	Target Center	Kali Uchis; Vince Staples; Teezo Touchdown
February 22, 2022	Chicago	United States	United Center	Kali Uchis; Vince Staples; Teezo Touchdown
February 24, 2022	Milwaukee	United States	Fiserv Forum	Kali Uchis; Vince Staples; Teezo Touchdown
February 27, 2022	Columbus	United States	Schottenstein Center	Kali Uchis; Vince Staples; Teezo Touchdown
February 28, 2022	Detroit	United States	Little Caesars Arena	Kali Uchis; Vince Staples; Teezo Touchdown
March 3, 2022	Worcester	United States	DCU Center	Kali Uchis; Vince Staples; Teezo Touchdown
March 4, 2022	Norfolk	United States	Chartway Arena	Kali Uchis; Vince Staples; Teezo Touchdown
March 6, 2022	Philadelphia	United States	Wells Fargo Center	Kali Uchis; Vince Staples; Teezo Touchdown
March 7, 2022	Washington, D.C.	United States	Capital One Arena	Kali Uchis; Vince Staples; Teezo Touchdown
March 9, 2022	Laval	Canada	Place Bell	Kali Uchis; Vince Staples; Teezo Touchdown
March 11, 2022	Toronto	Canada	Scotiabank Arena	Kali Uchis; Vince Staples; Teezo Touchdown
March 12, 2022	Pittsburgh	United States	Petersen Events Center	Kali Uchis; Vince Staples; Teezo Touchdown
March 13, 2022	New York City	United States	Madison Square Garden	Kali Uchis; Vince Staples; Teezo Touchdown
March 14, 2022	New York City	United States	Madison Square Garden	Kali Uchis; Vince Staples; Teezo Touchdown
March 16, 2022	Charlotte	United States	Bojangles Coliseum	Kali Uchis; Vince Staples; Teezo Touchdown
March 18, 2022	Orlando	United States	Amway Center	Kali Uchis; Vince Staples; Teezo Touchdown
March 19, 2022	Tampa	United States	Yuengling Center	Kali Uchis; Vince Staples; Teezo Touchdown
March 20, 2022	Miami	United States	FTX Arena	Kali Uchis; Vince Staples; Teezo Touchdown
March 23, 2022	North Charleston	United States	North Charleston Coliseum	Kali Uchis; Vince Staples; Teezo Touchdown
March 25, 2022	Duluth	United States	Gas South Arena	Kali Uchis; Vince Staples; Teezo Touchdown
March 27, 2022	Houston	United States	Toyota Center	Kali Uchis; Vince Staples; Teezo Touchdown
March 29, 2022	Denver	United States	Ball Arena	Kali Uchis; Vince Staples; Teezo Touchdown
March 31, 2022	Los Angeles	United States	Crypto.com Arena	Kali Uchis; Vince Staples; Teezo Touchdown
April 1, 2022	Oakland	United States	Oakland Arena	Kali Uchis; Vince Staples; Teezo Touchdown
April 2, 2022	Sacramento	United States	Golden 1 Center	Kali Uchis; Vince Staples; Teezo Touchdown
April 4, 2022	Portland	United States	Moda Center	Kali Uchis; Vince Staples; Teezo Touchdown
April 7, 2022	Vancouver	Canada	Pacific Coliseum	Kali Uchis; Vince Staples; Teezo Touchdown
April 8, 2022	Seattle	United States	Climate Pledge Arena	Kali Uchis; Vince Staples; Teezo Touchdown
June 3, 2022 (Note: Part of Orange Warsaw Festival.)	Warsaw	Poland	Sljuzjewiec Racetrack	—N/a
June 4, 2022 (Note: Part of Primavera Sound.)	Barcelona	Spain	Parc del Fòrum	—N/a
June 5, 2022	Paris	France	Zénith Paris	—N/a
June 7, 2022	Amsterdam	Netherlands	AFAS Live	—N/a
June 9, 2022	Barcelona	Spain	Parc del Fòrum	—N/a
June 11, 2022 (Note: Part of Rosendal Garden Party.)	Stockholm	Sweden	Rosendals Trädgård	—N/a
June 12, 2022 (Note: Part of Parklife Festival)	Manchester	England	Heaton Park	—N/a
July 1, 2022 (Note: Part of Roskilde Festival.)	Roskilde	Denmark	Darupvej	—N/a
July 2, 2022 (Note: Part of Longitude Festival.)	Dublin	Ireland	Marlay Park	—N/a
July 3, 2022 (Note: Part of Wireless Festival.)	London	England	Crystal Palace Park	—N/a
July 6, 2022 (Note: Part of Openair Frauenfeld)	Frauenfeld	Switzerland	Grosse Allmend	—N/a
July 8, 2022 (Note: Part of Les Ardentes)	Liège	Belgium	Rocourt	—N/a
July 22, 2022	Auckland	New Zealand	Spark Arena	Tierra Whack
July 24, 2022 (Note: Part of Splendour in the Grass.)	Byron Bay	Australia	North Byron Parklands	—N/a
July 26, 2022	Perth	Australia	RAC Arena	Tierra Whack
July 29, 2022	Sydney	Australia	Qudos Bank Arena	Tierra Whack
July 30, 2022	Sydney	Australia	Qudos Bank Arena	Tierra Whack
August 2, 2022	Melbourne	Australia	Rod Laver Arena	Tierra Whack
August 3, 2022	Melbourne	Australia	Rod Laver Arena	Tierra Whack
