= Part-time =

Part-time may refer to:

- Part-time job, a job that has fewer hours a week than a full-time job
- Part-time student, a student, usually in higher education, who takes fewer course credits than a full-time student
- Part Time (band), an American pop band
- Part Time (album), a live album by James Blood Ulmer

== See also ==
- Full-time (disambiguation)
