= Igor (album) =

- Digital cover. CD releases are also available with yellow, blue or green backgrounds.

Studio album by Tyler, the Creator
- Released: May 17, 2019
- Recorded: 2017–2019
- Studios: Chalice (Los Angeles); Coldwater (Los Angeles); Conway (Los Angeles); Westlake (Los Angeles); O'Shefia (Atlanta); Paramount (Hollywood); Shangri-La (Malibu); Villa Batell (Lake Como)
- Genres: Hip-hop; funk; R&B; neo soul
- Length: 39:43
- Label: Columbia
- Producers: Tyler, the Creator

Tyler, the Creator chronology
Music Inspired by Illumination & Dr. Seuss' The Grinch (2018)	Igor (2019)	Call Me If You Get Lost (2021)

Singles from Igor
- 1. "Earfquake" Released: June 4, 2019

Igor (stylized in all caps) is the sixth studio album by the American rapper and producer Tyler, the Creator, released on May 17, 2019, through Columbia Records. Produced solely by Tyler himself, the album features guest appearances from Playboi Carti, Lil Uzi Vert, Solange, Kanye West, and Jerrod Carmichael. Following the release of Tyler's previous album Flower Boy (2017), the album was primarily recorded in California, with recording sessions also being held in Lake Como, Italy, and Atlanta between 2017 and 2019. Described by critics and Tyler himself as an album blending hip-hop, neo soul, R&B, funk, and pop, critics have also noted the album's use of synthesizers and lo-fi vocals. Thematically, Igor follows a narrative of a love triangle between the titular character and his male love interest. The album employs the "Igor" literary archetype to explore themes associated with love, such as heartbreak, loss, and jealousy.

To help market the album, Tyler, the Creator released the single "Earfquake", which reached number 13 on the US Billboard Hot 100, becoming his highest-charting single at the time. In its first week of release, Igor debuted at number one on the US Billboard 200, moving 165,000 album-equivalent units, becoming Tyler, the Creator's first US number-one album. It was a widespread critical success, with critics praising the production and growth on the album, while Tyler's experimentation received mixed reactions; it was named among the best albums of 2019 in many publications' year-end lists, and it won Best Rap Album at the 2020 Grammy Awards, becoming Tyler's first Grammy win.

== Background and recording ==
Work on the album began in 2017, with Tyler, the Creator initially writing the song "Earfquake" for Canadian singer Justin Bieber and Barbadian singer Rihanna, both of whom turned down the song. The song "I Think" was recorded in Lake Como, Italy, with the help of American singer Solange. Tyler wrote "Running Out of Time" during a recording session with American rapper ASAP Ferg. Tyler produced the beat for "Gone, Gone / Thank You" in 2013 while on tour for his third studio album Wolf, choosing to scrap the song from both Cherry Bomb and Flower Boy as he felt it didn't fit either of those albums.

In an interview with Fantastic Man for their Autumn and Winter 2018 issue, Tyler was asked if he had ever been in love, to which he replied: "I don't want to talk about that. Um, that's the next record." In October 2018, Tyler previewed the song "Running Out of Time" for an interview with Fast Company.

On April 26, 2019, a supplemental financial report from Sony revealed that a new album from Tyler was expected by the end of June. In early May 2019, Tyler released snippets for the tracks "Igor's Theme" and "What's Good". The album was first announced by Tyler through his social media accounts on May 6, 2019.

== Composition and lyrics ==
"Earfquake"
The main single from the album

Rolling Stone writer Danny Schwartz described Igor as a "rich and messy mélange of R&B, funk and rap". The album is synth-heavy, with neo soul melodies and low-mixed vocals. After winning Best Rap Album at the 2020 Grammy Awards, Tyler complained about the Grammys' choice to place him in the Rap and Urban categories, rather than the generic pop category, as being racially motivated and a "backhanded compliment".

The album follows a narrative of a love triangle where Tyler is in love with a man who is already dating another person. American comedian Jerrod Carmichael serves as the album's narrator as it progresses, speaking short lines to make sense of Tyler's and the title character Igor's state of mind. Carmichael first appears on the album's fourth track "Exactly What You Run from You End Up Chasing". The character Igor is mentioned by name on the tracks "Igor's Theme" and "What's Good"; he follows the Gothic "Igor" archetype as a villain's assistant and represents a darker, apathetic side of Tyler that is revealed. Igor arrives after Tyler pours out all of his heart for his love interest, though his love interest remains focused on his ex-girlfriend. The arrival of Igor serves as a reset for the strong romantic emotions Tyler was entangled in during the album's first half. "Earfquake" is an R&B song which has been described by music critics as either Tyler falling in love or experiencing heartbreak. In "I Think", he starts to question his relationship with his newfound partner and reveals his unhealthy attraction to him: the latter of which is elaborated in "Puppet". Tyler declares his love for a former partner and regrets dating someone else in "New Magic Wand"; he further details his relationship in "A Boy Is a Gun", where he describes his intimate life. "Gone, Gone / Thank You", "I Don't Love You Anymore", and "Are We Still Friends?" go over Tyler's breakup and its aftermath.

== Promotion ==
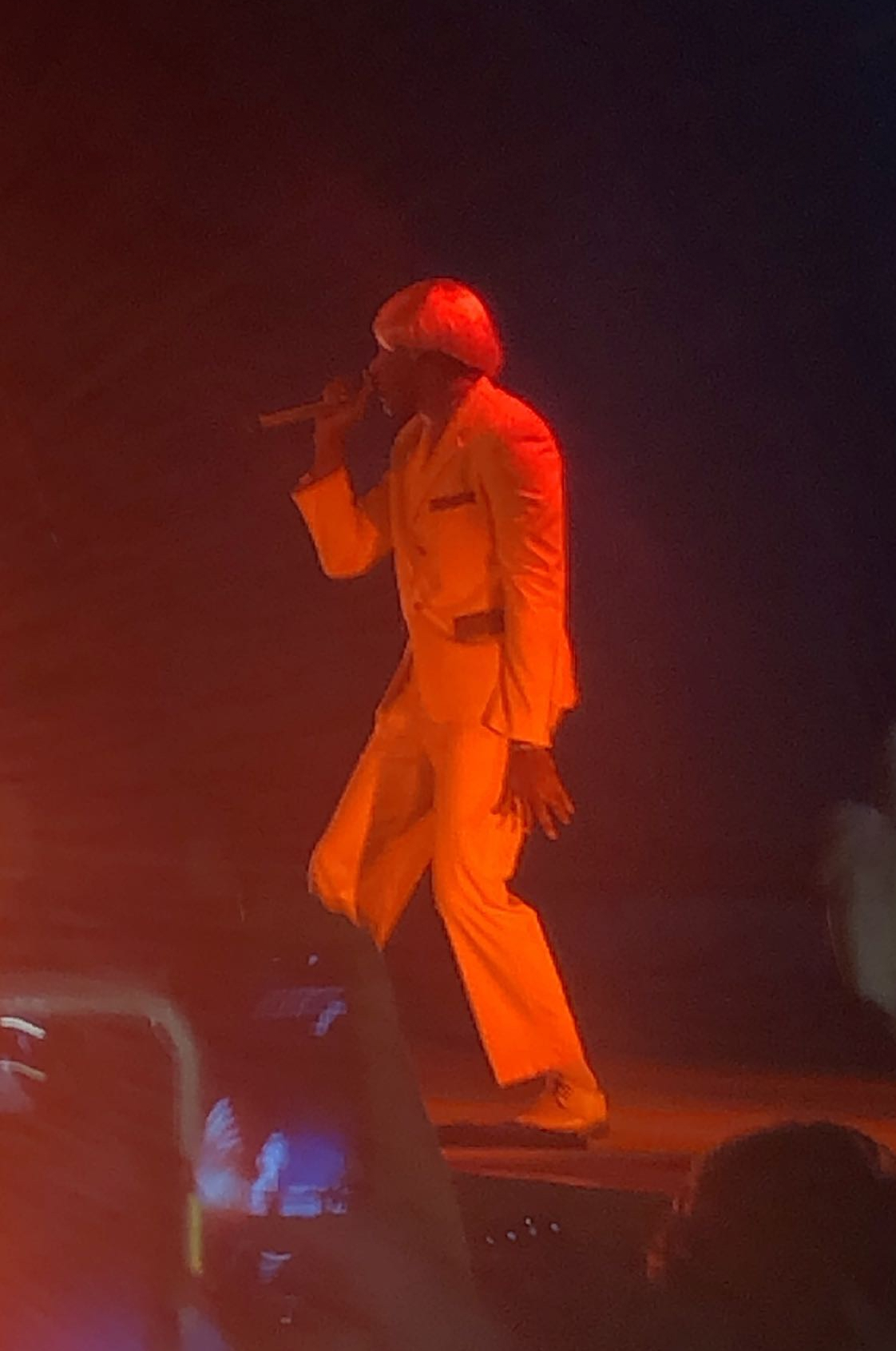
Tyler performing in concert (2019)

A music video for the song "Earfquake" was released alongside the album's release on May 17, 2019. It was sent to rhythmic contemporary radio on June 4, 2019, as the album's lead single in the United States. On June 3, 2019, Tyler announced his forthcoming tour for the album, which was supported by Jaden Smith, Blood Orange, and GoldLink.

A short clip of the album's seventh track, entitled "A Boy is a Gun*", was released on May 13, 2019. The full music video for the song was released on September 16, 2019. On October 24, 2019, a music video was released for the album's third track, "I Think". Apple Music released the video album Apple Music Presents: Tyler, the Creator on August 14, 2019. The video album is a collection of eleven videos recorded from Tyler's first live performance of Igor, performed in May 2019.

== Critical reception ==
Igor ratings
Aggregate scores
Source	Rating
AnyDecentMusic?	7.9/10
Metacritic	81/100
Review scores
Source	Rating
AllMusic	5/5 stars
Clash	8/10
Consequence	A−
The Guardian	3/5 stars
HipHopDX	4.4/5
The Independent	5/5 stars
The New Zealand Herald	4/5 stars
NME	4/5 stars
Pitchfork	8.0/10
Rolling Stone	4/5 stars

Igor was met with widespread critical acclaim. At Metacritic, which assigns a normalized rating out of 100 to reviews from professional publications, the album received an average score of 81, based on 18 reviews. Aggregator AnyDecentMusic? gave it 7.9 out of 10, based on their assessment of the critical consensus.

Several critics praised Tyler, the Creator's inventive production and artistic growth on IGOR. Roisin O'Connor of The Independent called the album Tyler's "best work to date", emphasizing its unconventional structure and intricate production. She described the experience as being led through a maze, which she lent to the album's "twists and turns". Similarly, Andy Kellman of AllMusic commended the album for its emotional depth, comparing it to a classic soul LP for its expression of "pain, vulnerability, and compulsion", while Danny Schwartz of Rolling Stone appreciated the vulnerability Tyler displayed, explaining that he reveals himself as a "shape-shifting artist who is still growing".

Other critics highlighted IGOR's evolution in Tyler's sound, noting its blend of pop, soul, and hip-hop influences. Daniel Spielberger of HipHopDX commented on Tyler's more polished style, which, despite moving away from his rapper persona, creates a "hazy pop" album that invites risk-taking. Nick Roseblade from Clash noticed this shift in tone as well, describing how Tyler's previous aggressive style has softened into "slower beats and irresistible soul hooks". He noted that while the change may be jarring initially, the album's progression reveals a "new Tyler" that becomes increasingly captivating. Sam Moore of NME added that IGOR is an "accomplished and evergreen record" that deserves undivided attention.

Some reviews, however, offered mixed reactions to Tyler's stylistic experimentation. Sputnikmusic reviewer Rowan5215 felt IGOR wasn't necessarily Tyler's best work, though he acknowledged that Tyler's risk-taking pays off in tracks like "I Think" and "A Boy Is a Gun". The minimalist approach, he argued, suits Tyler well but can feel repetitive in songs such as "Running Out of Time". In a similarly measured review, Dean Van Nguyen of The Guardian appreciated the album's ingenuity but felt it lacked the memorable qualities of Tyler's past work, ultimately calling IGOR a "fine showcase of ingenuity" that doesn't always linger in the listener's mind. Nguyen additionally criticized the lack of Tyler's production, rapping, and the "raw, uncompromising humanity" present in his work.

== Accolades ==
Select rankings of Igor
Publication	List	Rank	Ref.
Billboard	100 Best Albums of the 2010s	54	
Billboard	50 Best Albums of 2019	7	
Complex	Best Albums of 2019	1	
The Guardian	The 50 Best Albums of 2019	5	
The Independent	The 50 Best Albums of 2019	6	
NME	The 50 Best Albums of 2019	2	
Now	The 10 Best Albums of 2019	2	
Pitchfork	The 50 Best Albums of 2019	23	
Rolling Stone	50 Best Albums of 2019	12	
Slant Magazine	The 25 Best Albums of 2019	23	
Sputnikmusic	Top 50 Albums of 2019	15	

=== Industry awards ===
Awards and nominations for Igor
Ceremony	Year	Category	Result	Ref.
BET Hip Hop Awards	2019	Album of the Year	Nominated	
Grammy Awards	2020	Best Rap Album	Won	

== Commercial performance ==
Igor debuted at number one on the US Billboard 200 with 165,000 album-equivalent units, of which 74,000 were pure album sales. It was Tyler's first US number-one album. It has been certified two-times platinum in the United States, New Zealand, Norway, and Poland; platinum in Australia, Brazil, Canada, Denmark, France, Italy, and the United Kingdom; and gold in Mexico and Portugal. "Earfquake", the only single from the album, peaked at number 13 on the Billboard Hot 100 and remained there for 15 weeks; "Igor's Theme", "I Think", "Puppet", "What's Good, "New Magic Wand", "Running Out of Time", and "A Boy Is a Gun" all stayed for one week on the same charts, peaking at numbers 67, 51, 88, 85, 70, 65, and 74, respectively.

== Track listing ==
All tracks are written by Tyler Okonma, with additional writers noted. All production handled by Tyler, the Creator.

Igor track listing
No.	Title	Writer(s)	Length
1.	"Igor's Theme"	Symere Woods	3:20
2.	"Earfquake"	Jordan Carter	3:10
3.	"I Think"	Bodiono Nkono Télesphore^{[a]}; Bibi Mascel^{[a]}	3:32
4.	"Exactly What You Run from You End Up Chasing"		0:14
5.	"Running Out of Time"		2:57
6.	"New Magic Wand"		3:15
7.	"A Boy Is a Gun"	Bobby Dukes^{[b]}; Bobby Massey^{[b]}; Lester Allen McKenzie^{[b]}	3:30
8.	"Puppet"	Kanye West; Mick Ware^{[c]}; David Smith^{[c]}	2:59
9.	"What's Good"		3:25
10.	"Gone, Gone / Thank You"	Cullen Omori^{[d]}; Alan O'Day^{[d]}; Tatsuro Yamashita^{[d]}	6:15
11.	"I Don't Love You Anymore"		2:41
12.	"Are We Still Friends?"	Al Green^{[e]}	4:25
Total length:			39:43

CD, vinyl and cassette release
No.	Title	Writer(s)	Length
4.	"Boyfriend"	John Charles Alder^{[f]}	4:00
Total length:			43:29

Notes

- All tracks are stylized in all caps.
- "Exactly What You Run From You End Up Chasing" is added to the end of "Boyfriend" on physical releases.
- "A Boy Is a Gun" is stylized as "A BOY IS A GUN*".

Samples

- "Igor's Theme" incorporates uncredited elements of "Attention", performed by Head West.
- ^{^[a]} "I Think" incorporates elements of "Get Down", written and composed by Bodiono Nkono Télesphore, and performed by Nkono Teles; and "Special Lady", written and performed by Bibi Mascel.
- "Running Out of Time" contains samples of "Hit It Run", performed by Run-DMC.
- "New Magic Wand" incorporates elements of "Vsichni Praznj", written and performed by Siluetes 61.
- ^{^[b]} "A Boy Is a Gun" contains excerpts from "Bound", written by Bobby Dukes, Bobby Massey, and Lester Allen McKenzie, and performed by Ponderosa Twins Plus One.
- ^{^[c]} "Puppet" incorporates elements of "Today", written by Mick Ware and performed by Czar; and contains excerpts from "It's Alright With Me", written by David Smith and performed by Part Time.
- ^{^[d]} "Gone, Gone / Thank You" contains excerpts from "Hey Girl", written and performed by Cullen Omori; and interpolations from "Fragile", written by Alan O'Day and Tatsuro Yamashita, and performed by Yamashita.
- ^{^[e]} "Are We Still Friends?" contains excerpts from "Dream", written and performed by Al Green.
- ^{^[f]} "Boyfriend" contains excerpts from "Fluid", written by John Charles Alder and performed by Twink.

== Personnel ==
Credits adapted from liner notes.

=== Musicians ===
- Tyler Okonma – lead vocals, production, arrangement
- Lil Uzi Vert – vocals (track 1)
- Playboi Carti – rap verse (track 2)
- Solange – vocals (track 3), background vocals (tracks 7, 11)
- Jerrod Carmichael – vocals (track 4), additional vocals (tracks 6, 8–10, "Boyfriend")
- Kanye West – rap verse (track 8)
- Anthony Evans – background vocals (tracks 1, 3, 10)
- Amanda Brown – background vocals (tracks 1, 3, 10)
- Tiffany Stevenson – background vocals (tracks 1, 3, 10)
- Charlie Wilson – background vocals (tracks 2, 11, "Boyfriend")
- Jessy Wilson – background vocals (tracks 2, 5, 6, 8, 10, 11)
- Ryan Beatty – background vocals (track 3)
- Santigold – background vocals (tracks 4, 6, 8, "Boyfriend")
- CeeLo Green – background vocals (track 10)
- La Roux – background vocals (track 10)
- Pharrell Williams – background vocals (track 12)
- Slowthai – additional vocals (track 9)
- Kevin Kendricks – keyboards (track 3), additional keyboards (track 7), chimes (track 8)
- Jack White

=== Technical ===
- Vic Wainstein – recording (tracks 1–3, 5–12)
- Tyler Okonma – recording (tracks 1–3, 5–9, 11)
- Kingston Callaway – recording (track 10)
- John Armstrong – recording assistance (track 1)
- Ben Fletcher – recording assistance (track 1)
- Rob Bisel – recording assistance (tracks 1, 3, 9)
- Ashley Jacobson – recording assistance (track 2)
- Thomas Cullison – recording assistance (tracks 2, 10)
- Josh Sellers – recording assistance (tracks 5, 6)
- Derrick Jenner – recording assistance (track 7)
- Neal H Pogue – mixing
- Zachary Acosta – mix assistance
- MeMiceElfani – mix assistance
- Mike Bozzi – mastering

== Charts ==
=== Weekly charts ===
Weekly chart performance
Chart (2019–2025)	Peak position
Australian Albums (ARIA)	3
Austrian Albums (Ö3 Austria)	7
Belgian Albums (Ultratop Flanders)	5
Belgian Albums (Ultratop Wallonia)	40
Canadian Albums (Billboard)	2
Czech Albums (ČNS IFPI)	5
Danish Albums (Hitlisten)	4
Dutch Albums (Album Top 100)	3
Finnish Albums (Suomen virallinen lista)	6
French Albums (SNEP)	43
German Albums (Offizielle Top 100)	29
Hungarian Physical Albums (MAHASZ)	9
Irish Albums (IRMA)	4
Italian Albums (FIMI)	32
Latvian Albums (LAIPA)	1
Lithuanian Albums (AGATA)	1
New Zealand Albums (RMNZ)	2
Norwegian Albums (VG-lista)	3
Polish Albums (ZPAV)	13
Scottish Albums (Official Charts)	20
Slovak Albums (ČNS IFPI)	5
Swedish Albums (Sverigetopplistan)	5
Swiss Albums (Schweizer Hitparade)	14
UK Albums (Official Charts)	4
UK R&B Albums (Official Charts)	3
US Billboard 200	1
US Top R&B/Hip-Hop Albums (Billboard)	1

=== Year-end charts ===
2019 year-end chart performance
Chart (2019)	Position
Australian Albums (ARIA)	61
Belgian Albums (Ultratop Flanders)	138
Danish Albums (Hitlisten)	74
Icelandic Albums (Tónlistinn)	40
US Billboard 200	71
US Top R&B/Hip-Hop Albums (Billboard)	30

2020 year-end chart performance
Chart (2020)	Position
Australian Albums (ARIA)	83
Belgian Albums (Ultratop Flanders)	160
Icelandic Albums (Tónlistinn)	62
US Billboard 200	151
US Top R&B/Hip-Hop Albums (Billboard)	98

2021 year-end chart performance
Chart (2021)	Position
Australian Albums (ARIA)	98
Belgian Albums (Ultratop Flanders)	195
Icelandic Albums (Tónlistinn)	67
US Billboard 200	134
US Top R&B/Hip-Hop Albums (Billboard)	94

2022 year-end chart performance
Chart (2022)	Position
Australian Albums (ARIA)	55
Belgian Albums (Ultratop Flanders)	150
Icelandic Albums (Tónlistinn)	54
Lithuanian Albums (AGATA)	28
US Billboard 200	72
US Top R&B/Hip-Hop Albums (Billboard)	37

2023 year-end chart performance
Chart (2023)	Position
Australian Albums (ARIA)	82
Belgian Albums (Ultratop Flanders)	110
Icelandic Albums (Tónlistinn)	67
US Billboard 200	54
US Top R&B/Hip-Hop Albums (Billboard)	22

2024 year-end chart performance
Chart (2024)	Position
Australian Albums (ARIA)	75
Australian Hip Hop/R&B Albums (ARIA)	20
Belgian Albums (Ultratop Flanders)	79
Icelandic Albums (Tónlistinn)	56
Polish Albums (ZPAV)	48
US Billboard 200	98
US Top R&B/Hip-Hop Albums (Billboard)	39

2025 year-end chart performance
Chart (2025)	Position
Australian Albums (ARIA)	80
Belgian Albums (Ultratop Flanders)	69
Belgian Albums (Ultratop Wallonia)	157
Icelandic Albums (Tónlistinn)	72
Polish Albums (ZPAV)	52
US Billboard 200	66
US Top R&B/Hip-Hop Albums (Billboard)	21

== Certifications and sales ==
Certifications and sales thresholds
Region	Certification	Certified units/sales
Australia (ARIA)	Platinum	70,000^{‡}
Brazil (Pro-Música Brasil)	Platinum	40,000^{‡}
Canada (Music Canada)	Platinum	80,000^{‡}
Denmark (IFPI Danmark)	2× Platinum	40,000^{‡}
France (SNEP)	Platinum	100,000^{‡}
Iceland (FHF)	—	4,494
Italy (FIMI)	Platinum	50,000^{‡}
Mexico (AMPROFON)	Gold	30,000^{‡}
New Zealand (RMNZ)	2× Platinum	30,000^{‡}
Norway (IFPI Norway)	2× Platinum	40,000^{‡}
Poland (ZPAV)	2× Platinum	40,000^{‡}
Portugal (AFP)	Gold	3,500^{‡}
United Kingdom (BPI)	Platinum	300,000^{‡}
United States (RIAA)	2× Platinum	2,000,000^{‡}
^{‡} Sales+streaming figures based on certification alone.

== See also ==
- 2019 in music
- Flower Boy
