= Igor's Theme =

Song by Tyler, the Creator

from the album Igor
- Released: May 17, 2019
- Genre: Synth-pop
- Length: 3:20
- Label: Columbia
- Songwriters: Tyler, the Creator - Symere Woods
- Producers: Tyler, the Creator

"Igor's Theme" (stylized in all caps) is a song by American rapper and producer Tyler, the Creator. It is the introductory song from his fifth studio album Igor, released on May 19, 2019. It has uncredited vocals from fellow artist Lil Uzi Vert.

== Production and composition ==
The track starts with a 23-second synth. The drums started at the 24-second mark, which was sampled from the song "Attention" by Bob Welch, released in 1970. The drum-line has a tempo of 79 beats per minute. The song adds the lyrical context that the rest of the album uses, explaining the things happening in the album. The song also captures the "excitement" to be in a new relationship.

== Release and promotion ==
The song was first seen in a 50-second snippet released on May 1, 2019.

== Charts ==
Chart performance for "Igor's Theme"
Chart (2019)	Peak position
Australia (ARIA)	45
Australian Urban (ARIA)	15
Canada Hot 100 (Billboard)	68
Ireland (IRMA)	34
Latvia (LaIPA)	11
Lithuania (AGATA)	20
New Zealand Hot Singles (RMNZ)	6
Portugal (AFP)	61
Slovakia Singles Digital (ČNS IFPI)	94
UK Singles (Official Charts)	41
UK Hip Hop/R&B (Official Charts)	19
US Billboard Hot 100	67
US Hot R&B/Hip-Hop Songs (Billboard)	33

== Certifications ==
Certifications for "Igor's Theme"
Region	Certification	Certified units/sales
Canada (Music Canada)	Gold	40,000^{‡}
New Zealand (RMNZ)	Gold	15,000^{‡}
United States (RIAA)	Gold	500,000^{‡}
Streaming
Sweden (GLF)	Gold	4,000,000^{†}
^{‡} Sales+streaming figures based on certification alone.^{†} Streaming-only figures based on certification alone.
