= Scotiabank Arena =

Indoor arena in Toronto, Ontario, Canada

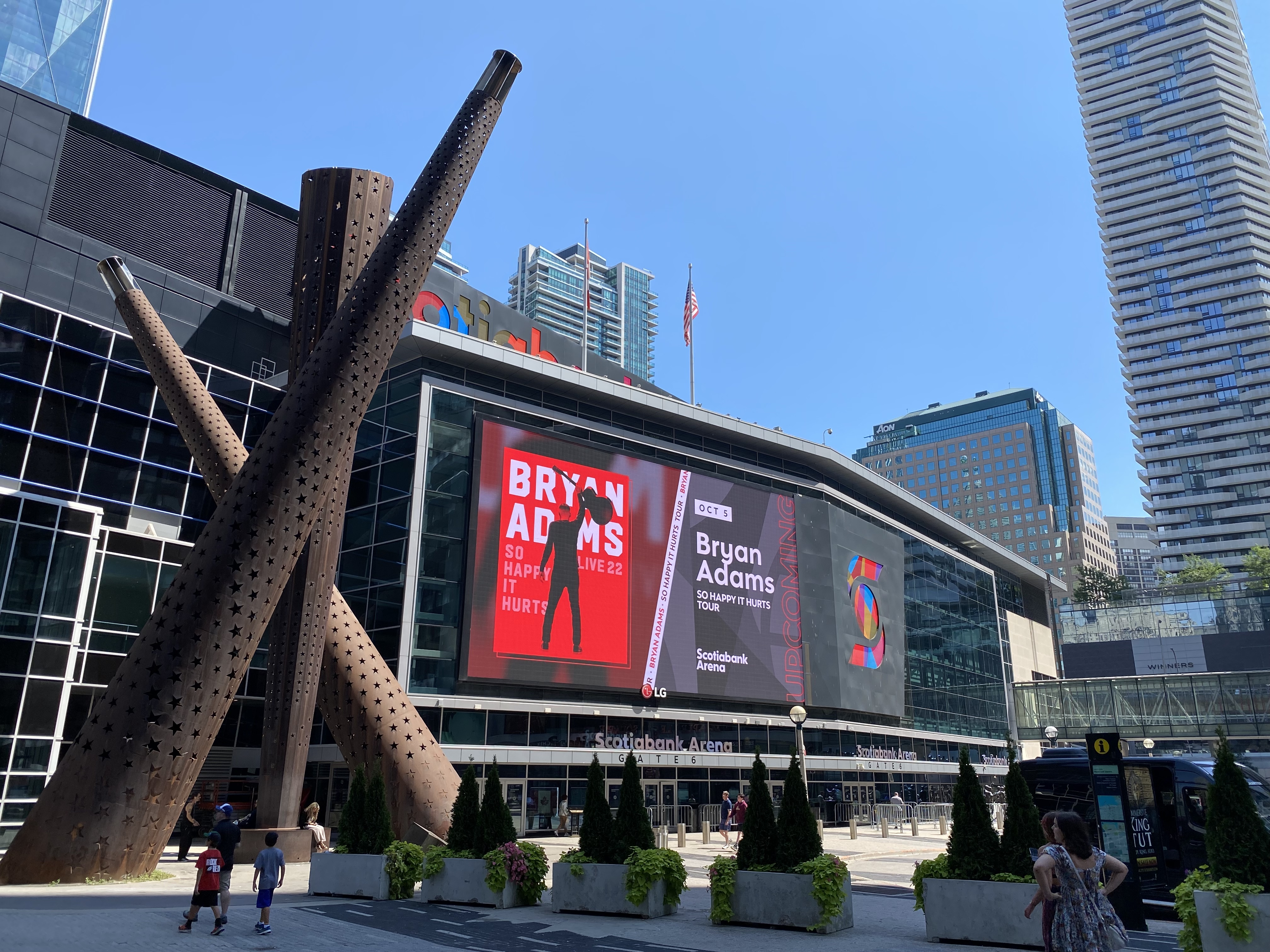
- Scotiabank Arena in 2022

- Location in Toronto Location in Southern Ontario Location in Ontario Location in Canada
- Former names: Toronto Postal Delivery Building; Air Canada Centre (ACC) (1999–2018)
- Address: 40 Bay Street
- Location: Toronto, Ontario, Canada
- Coordinates: 43°38′36″N 79°22′45″W
- Owner: Rogers Communications (building); Metrolinx and 3642968 Canada Inc. (lands)
- Operator: Maple Leaf Sports & Entertainment
- Capacity: Basketball: 19,800 (20,511 with standing room); Concerts: 19,800; Ice hockey: 18,819 (20,270 with standing room); Theatre: 5,200
- Acreage: 61,780.5 m^{2} (665,000 sq ft)
- Public transit: Union Station; Union; Union Bus Terminal
- Parking: 2 underground levels for 212 vehicles

Construction
- Groundbreaking: 1938 (original building); March 12, 1997 (reconstruction)
- Opened: February 19, 1999
- Cost: CA$265 million ($468 million in 2025 dollars); Renovations: 2003: $5 million ($7.99 million in 2025 dollars) 2015: $10 million ($13 million in 2025 dollars) 2023: $350 million
- Architects: Brisbin Brook Beynon Architects (Architect of Record); HOK Sport (Consulting Architects)
- Project manager: Clarendon Projects Ltd.
- Structural engineer: Yolles Partnership Inc.
- Services engineers: The Mitchell Partnership, Inc.
- General contractor: PCL Constructors Western, Inc.

Tenants
- Canada Post (1946–1994) Toronto Maple Leafs (NHL) (1999–present); Toronto Raptors (NBA) (1999–present); Toronto Rock (NLL) (2001–2020); Toronto Phantoms (AFL) (2001–2002)

Website
- scotiabankarena.com

Ontario Heritage Act
- Designated: 1990

Scotiabank Arena, formerly known as Air Canada Centre (ACC), is a multi-purpose arena located on Bay Street in downtown Toronto, Ontario, Canada. It is the home of the Toronto Raptors of the National Basketball Association (NBA) and the Toronto Maple Leafs of the National Hockey League (NHL). In addition, the minor league Toronto Marlies of the American Hockey League (AHL), the Raptors 905 of the NBA G League, and the Toronto Sceptres of the Professional Women's Hockey League (PWHL) play occasional games at the arena. The arena was previously home to the Toronto Phantoms of the Arena Football League (AFL) and the Toronto Rock of the National Lacrosse League. Scotiabank Arena also hosts other events, such as concerts, political conventions and video game competitions.

The arena is 61,780.5 square metres (665,000 square feet) in size. It is owned and operated by Maple Leaf Sports & Entertainment Ltd. (MLSE), a subsidiary of Rogers Communications, which also owns the Leafs and the Raptors, as well as their respective development teams.

The building was constructed in 1941 as the Toronto Postal Delivery Building for postal deliveries and was temporarily used by the Department of National Defence during World War II. After the war, the building was transferred to Canada Post in 1946 where it functioned as the main postal terminal for Metropolitan Toronto until 1989 when Canada Post moved its services to the Eastern Avenue facility. The Postal Building was sold to a consortium of developers but was reverted to Canada Post ownership in 1993 due to financial woes, but the new ownership of the soon-to-be Toronto Raptors basketball team acquired the building in December 1994 to construct the new arena. However, the Raptors were acquired by Maple Leaf Gardens Ltd., the owners of the Maple Leafs hockey team in 1998 during construction that began a year prior, to replace their outdated Maple Leaf Gardens arena. The arena was opened on February 19, 1999, at the cost of $288 million ($499 million as of 2022), with the Leafs playing the Montreal Canadiens the following night, and the Raptors playing the Vancouver Grizzlies the night after that.

In 2018, Scotiabank Arena was the 13th busiest arena in the world and the busiest in Canada. It is also the most photographed location in Canada on Instagram according to BuzzFeed. Scotiabank Arena is connected to Union Station's railway, subway and regional bus services and is connected to the Path.

== History ==
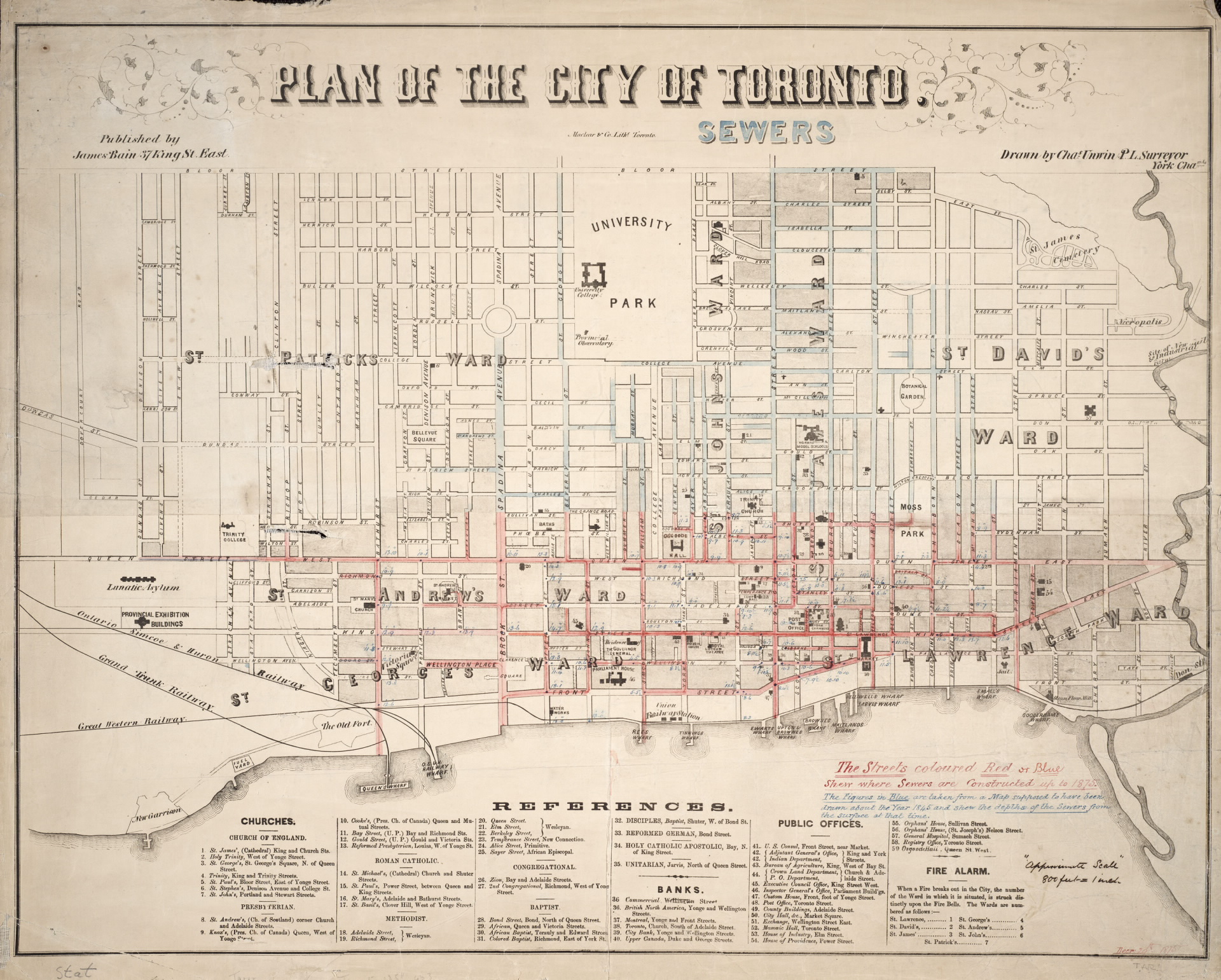
Map of downtown Toronto in 1858

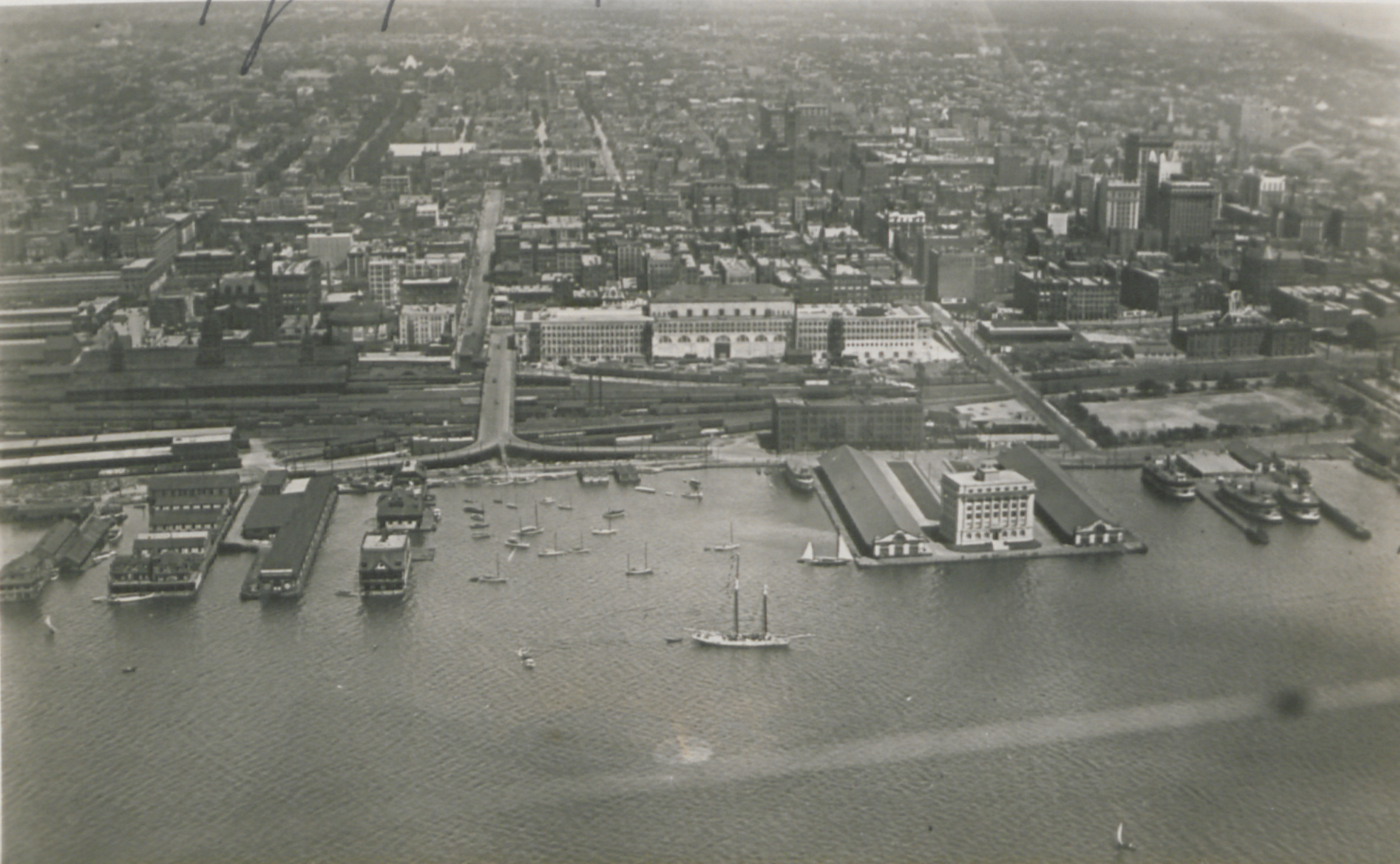
The Railway Lands between the Toronto waterfront and Front Street, c. 1919 the stadium site being in the centre area of this photo

The venue is located on land that was once part of Toronto's inner harbour. Infill of the inner harbour began in the 1850s and accelerated with the arrival of the railroad resulting in the current-day shape of downtown. By 1858, the site was located between two wharves (Rees Wharf and Tinnings Wharf). As land was expanded southward, it remained under government control as possible locations for various Union Station expansions. The majority of the land was still part of the lake up until the early 1900s. By 1925, the northern parcel of the property was turned into Bayside Park, which had been part of an early proposal that was to have seen the lands south of the rail corridor transformed into an extensive lakeside park that followed today's Esplanade. The remaining land was most likely under the control of Central Harbour Terminals.

=== Postal Delivery Building ===
In the 1930s, the property became the proposed home to Canada Post's Toronto Postal Delivery Building. In the 1920s, a postal handling facility already existed in the east wing of the city's then-new Union Station (Downtown Toronto's third major train station). However, it quickly reached capacity by the 1930s due to major population growth of Toronto and its surrounding region. In 1937, the Postmaster General appealed to the Minister of Public Works to approve a new replacement facility at the corner of Bay Street and Fleet Street (now Lake Shore Boulevard). Approval was granted by the federal Department of Public Works in part to stimulate the depression impacted construction industry. Design and construction of the warehouse built with steel and concrete would begin in 1938. Designed by Charles B. Dolphin, it is a building that incorporates a combination of Art Deco and Art Moderne architectural style. The original building would be built for around $2 million (CAD) ($42.6 million in 2025 dollars). The building was strategically located south of Union Station and was connected directly to the train platforms via an underground tunnel. Trains would be able to directly unload mail and move it directly to the mail sorting centre.

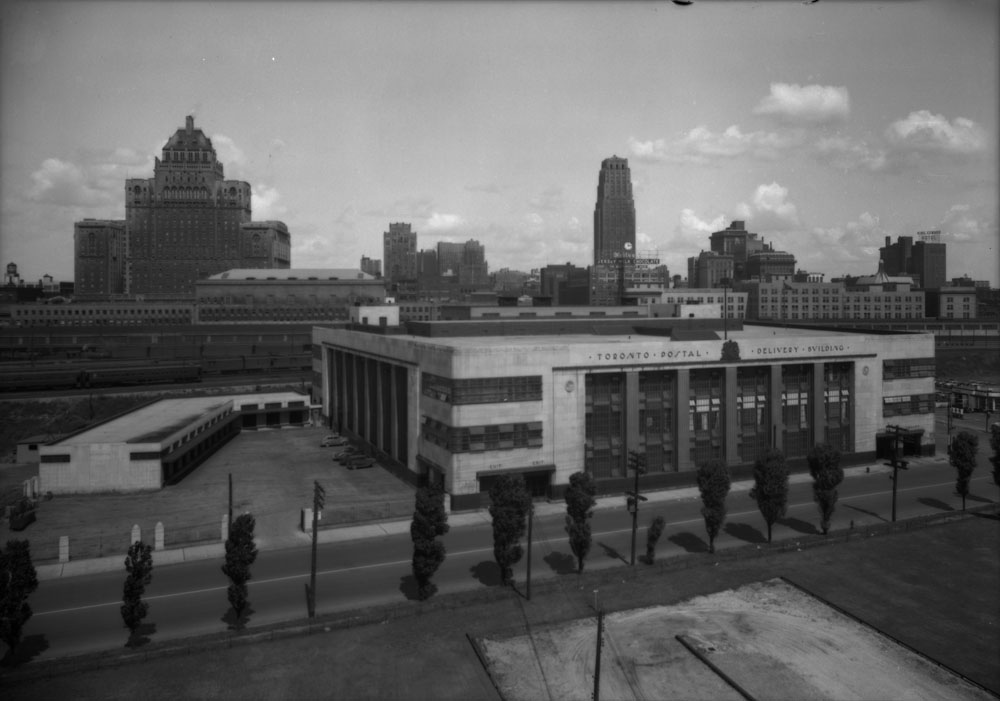
The original Toronto Postal delivery building, pictured in 1944.

Amid World War II, upon completion in 1941, the building would be temporarily handed over to the Department of National Defence for wartime storage purposes, and be finally turned over to Canada Post in 1946. Required modifications were made to the building to return it to its postal delivery purposes as a result of alterations done by the Department of National Defence. After the refurbishment work was completed in 1948, the building now possessed the capability and equipment for proper mail sorting and other mailing processing functions. Though it was designed as a mail sorting warehouse, it was also the home of Postal Station "A", which served mostly institutional and commercial clients. The ground floor was where the mail was dropped off by both railway carts and postal vans. Unsorted mail was moved by conveyor belts to the top floor and via gravity-fed mail chutes sorted by size and destination. Eventually, the sorted mail would end up back on the ground floor where it would be sent out for delivery. The building would be used as a postal sorting centre up until 1989.

==== Postal building sculptures ====
The structure's most notable features, which have been retained, are the exterior 13-part series of limestone bas relief carvings by Louis Temporale Sr. CM, which depicts the history of transportation and communication in Canada. Carved in 1938–39, the bas relief begins with scenes showing human speech, a runner carrying a message, aboriginals communicating by smoke signal, a group of voyageurs, a schooner and a Royal Mail steamship crossing the Atlantic Ocean from England, the CN train used during the 1939 Royal Tour, the mythical flying boat named 'Canopus' and northern travel by dog sled. The sculptor's son Louis Temporale Jr. helped with restoration efforts in 1998 and in 2016 was still critical of the lack of protection of the artwork by stadium ownership for over 20 years since the creation of the artwork. Being near the elevated Gardiner Expressway results in salt spray, which is speeding up the deterioration of the limestone.

==== Moving postal operations ====
In the late 1980s, the building and antiquated sorting equipment was in need of major renovations and expensive upgrades. In a cost-cutting move (part of larger overall service changes and cuts made to the Crown Corporation under the Brian Mulroney Progressive Conservatives), Canada Post decided to close the facility and move operations to an alternate more modern circa 1970s letter processing faculty on nearby Eastern Avenue. A structure with easy access to highways was designed specifically for transport truck bulk delivery of mail. By 1989, all of the old building's work was transferred here. The 1980s real estate boom saw the building site become surrounded by numerous skyscrapers, hotels, convention centres, SkyDome stadium and condo towers. In the early 1990s, real estate developers Bramalea Limited and Trizec arranged to purchase the building from Canada Post, with plans to redevelop the site into a 230,000-square-metre (2,500,000 sq ft) office, retail and residential space. Financial and development details of the purchase imposed various conditions prior to development, including rezoning by the city and remediation of soil contamination by Canada Post.

By this time, a deep prolonged recession had taken hold in the province, which saw many downtown Toronto high-rise construction projects paused or cancelled outright. There was limited market demand for new office space, one of the key requirements for acquiring bank loans. The resulting financing difficulties resulted in the building's ownership being reverted to Canada Post in 1993 with the structure remaining unused and abandoned. The Toronto Raptors' owners purchased the unused building from Canada Post the following year.

=== Multi-purpose arena ===
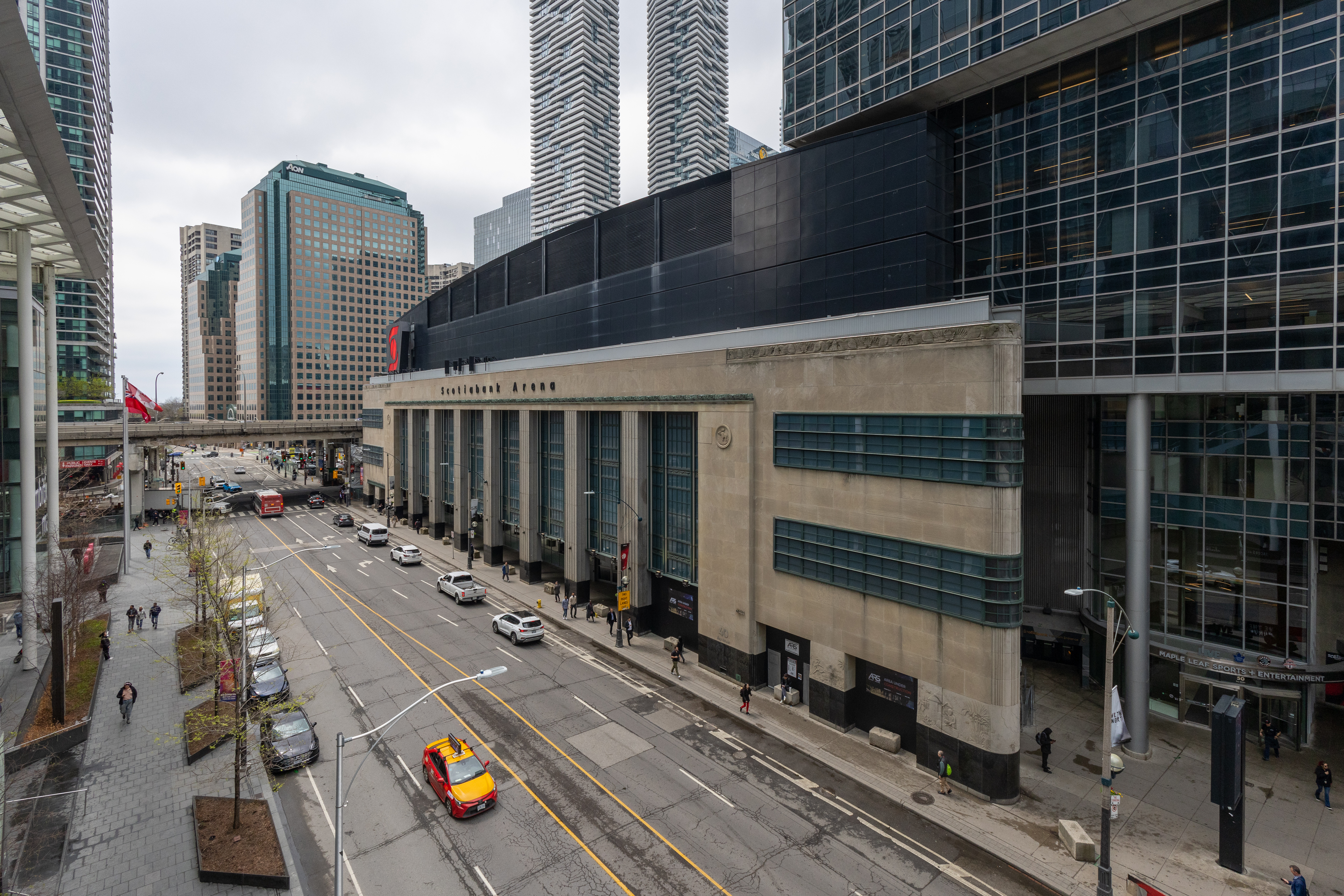
Scotiabank Arena along Bay Street. The arena retains the eastern and southern walls of the original postal structure built, through a process of facadism.

By 1993, it had been decided that the NBA would expand into Canada. Three competing bids were entertained in July of the same year. The NBA Expansion committee visited the various proposed stadium sites. Major selling points to the committee were a downtown location, easy underground access to the subway and Path system and proximity to the business core, which would hopefully make corporate boxes enticing to corporations.

On September 30, 1993, the NBA awarded the team to Professional Basketball Franchise Inc. (PBF), a company headed by Canadian businessman John Bitove. The Toronto Raptors were created and were required as terms of the winning bid to provide a suitable arena to play in. As part of the PBF proposal, the Canada Post building was ultimately chosen to be the new home of the Raptors in part due to its downtown location, proposed design and features along with lot size. Other sites considered included government-owned lands at Exhibition Place, North York City Centre, and downtown at Bay Street and Wellesley Street (a site of the planned Canadian Opera Hall in the 1980s). Another site under consideration by the Bitove group PBF, was at Bay Street and Dundas Street and would have been part of the neighbouring Eaton Centre. PBF purchased the Canada Post building and the land the building is on for CA$60 million.

The Raptors would initially play their first two seasons just a few hundred metres (a few thousand feet) away in the multipurpose SkyDome (now Rogers Centre) stadium while the arena was constructed. Groundbreaking took place in March 1997. The building retained the Art Deco Queenston limestone façade of the Toronto Postal Delivery Building along the east (along Bay Street) and south (Lake Shore Boulevard) walls of that structure, but the rest of the building (facing Union Station) was demolished to make room for the arena, through the process of facadism. The original building is protected under the Ontario Heritage Act.

==== Arena 'Wars' ====
Maple Leaf Gardens Limited, at the time the controlling owner of the Toronto Maple Leafs, were considering plans to build a new arena when the Raptors were awarded to Bitove's PBF Group. A race between the Raptors and Maple Leafs heated up centred around venues. The Raptors did not want to play in the antiquated Maple Leaf Gardens (other than when SkyDome was unavailable) and preferred the brand new multi-purpose SkyDome despite its vast size while their new arena was being built.

The 1930s-era Maple Leaf Gardens was showing its age; the Maple Leafs in desperate desire for a new facility began developing plans for building an all-new stadium with one of the key criteria for the new location that it must be within close walking proximity to both the subway system and GO Transit. During the early stages of construction, MLGL floated to the media plans of their own to build a competing single-use stadium on adjacent property just to the north of the stadium atop the train sheds at Union Station (similar to how Madison Square Garden was constructed) as the new home for the Toronto Maple Leafs. The reaction from Raptors was nothing but anger. The major problem of the Union Station proposal was that the land that the stadium would have been built on was actually City of Toronto land that was leased out to Canadian National Railway and Canadian Pacific Railway, which were in a major, long-standing dispute over rent payments (dating back to 1969). As a result, MLGL offered the city $156 million (in 1997 dollars) in cash and assets to settle any and all outstanding claims and to buy the air rights above the Union Station train platforms.

During this period, the Raptors were twice fined a million dollars (which were donated to their charitable foundation) by the NBA for missing deadlines to begin construction of their new arena, and disputes over the future of the arena resulted in John Bitove selling his stake to Allan Slaight as a result of a shotgun clause. Slaight then had majority ownership and immediately went into talks with MLGL, but realizing he could not share the building with the Maple Leafs, he subsequently sold both the Raptors and their partially completed arena to MLGL. This subsequently resulted in major modifications to the original design, which was basketball-specific, to make the arena become more suitable for hockey. Originally planned to cost $217 million, MLGL increased the budget to $265 million after taking control.

==== Construction ====
After the purchase of the Raptors and the Air Canada Centre from PBF, the new owners revised the design-build contract with PCL Construction to expand the hockey capabilities of the new arena, with the commitment to finish the stadium in 24 months by March 1, 1999. The integration of the Maple Leafs into the new structure would result in a 25-percent increase in construction costs (over $25 million CAD in 1999).

The completed structure included a 15-storey tower (that initially was Air Canada's main Toronto offices), four restaurants, and an underground parking lot.

==== Opening ====
In 1998, a strange twist of scheduling conflicts had the Toronto Raptors playing their final regular-season game at Copps Coliseum in Hamilton, as the Toronto Blue Jays of Major League Baseball had first right of refusal for all SkyDome dates. The Raptors had attempted to play the April 19 match at Maple Leaf Gardens, but were unsuccessful.

On December 30, 1998, the building's construction was completed, nine days ahead of schedule. Opening events took place early the next year. The first hockey game took place on February 20, 1999 (Toronto Maple Leafs vs. Montreal Canadiens), the first basketball game on February 21, 1999 (Toronto Raptors vs. Vancouver Grizzlies), and the opening concert on February 22, 1999 (The Tragically Hip). Features of the new building consist of a 65,000-square-foot (6,000 m^{2}) arena and a 165,000-square-foot (15,300 m^{2}) office tower. There is also an east–west covered, climate-controlled galleria and walkway onsite that contains restaurants, the ticket office, and other commercial units. The Galleria also connects Scotiabank Arena to popular locations in the downtown core such as Union Station, Bay Street and York Street. Scotiabank Arena is connected to the underground PATH network. The Galleria also doubles as a historical museum by displaying numerous artifacts from the old Canada Post building.

In its first ten years of operation, the new arena had an estimated economic benefit of $2.4 billion. This boosted Toronto's economy and led to further construction in the downtown core. Many projects in the area were completed ahead of schedule as a result of a desire to increase the infrastructure of downtown Toronto, and also from private funding (approximately $13 million) that was invested in seeing the economic growth of Toronto. These projects included the Bay West Teamway, Union Plaza, the Galleria (shopping centre), and Bremner Boulevard.

Air Canada purchased naming rights to the arena for US$30 million for 20 years. Several nicknames for the arena would emerge including "The Hangar", but it would be the acronym "ACC" that became the most commonly referenced shorthand for the venue and is still commonly used by local residents, even after the venue was renamed "Scotiabank Arena", out of habit and nostalgia, rather than in opposition to commercialism as is the case of the nearby SkyDome (later renamed Rogers Centre), given that it still had a commercial name.

==== 21st century ====
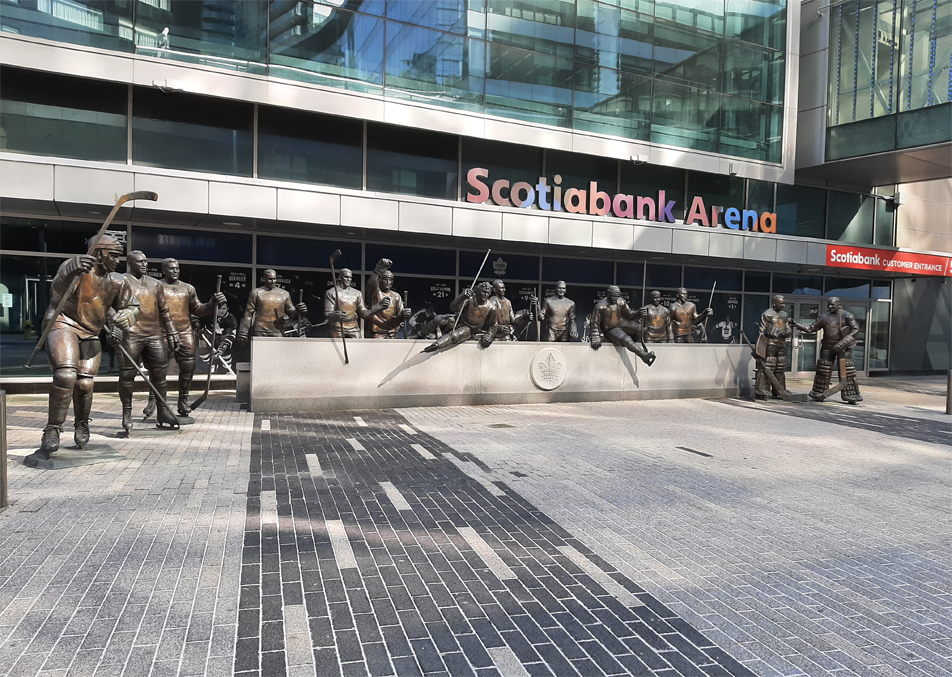
In September 2014, a group of life-sized statues of Leafs players were installed at the southwest corner of the arena.

In 2003, MLSE completed a $5-million upgrade of the arena, including a new LED signage system. During the summer of 2015, a $10-million upgrade of the arena was carried out, which included the installation of a new scoreboard four times larger than the previous one. The old scoreboard was later installed at Ricoh Coliseum in Exhibition Place.

In the winter of 2003–2004, the Alcohol and Gaming Commission of Ontario imposed a seven-day penalty on the arena for "permitting drunken patrons to be in the licensed patrons [sic]" in the fall of 2002 at a Toronto Maple Leafs game and also a Rolling Stones concert. As a result of these misdemeanours, there was no alcohol served at the arena from December 21 to 28 in 2003. The venue had multiple major events during this time frame, which included a Toronto Raptors–Orlando Magic game on December 21, a Toronto Maple Leafs–Florida Panthers game on December 23, and Disney on Ice: Toy Story 2, which ran from December 25, 2003, to January 1, 2004.

On September 6, 2014, a group of statues known as Legends Row was unveiled outside the arena at the southwest corner of the building. The statues were situated in multiple waves from 2014 to 2016 and include Ted Kennedy, Johnny Bower, Darryl Sittler, Borje Salming, Syl Apps, George Armstrong, Mats Sundin, Dave Keon, Turk Broda, and Tim Horton. In 2017, the final four statues were unveiled including Red Kelly, Frank Mahovlich, Charlie Conacher, and Wendel Clark. Legends Row now features 14 life-sized statues of former Maple Leaf players alongside a 9-metre-long (30 ft) granite players' bench.

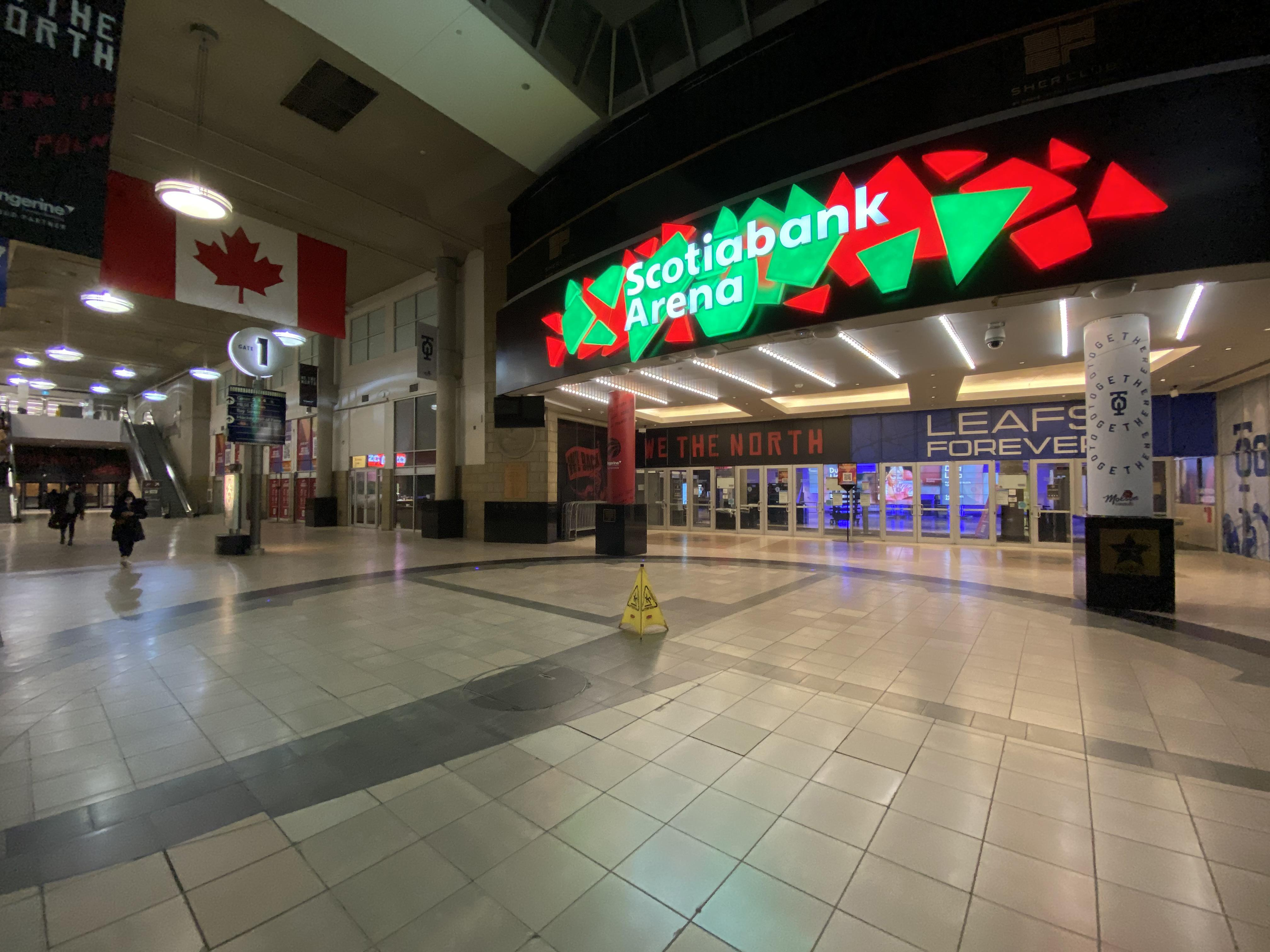
Scotiabank Arena indoor entrance in 2021; the left side is the escalators for a new Path network connection to the CIBC Square office complex

The Air Canada Centre was renamed "Scotiabank Arena" on July 1, 2018. The landmark 20-year sponsorship agreement between Maple Leaf Sports & Entertainment and Scotiabank is worth about C$800 million. This is believed to be the highest-priced annual building and team sponsorship in North American sports history. The arena is the third in Canada to bear naming rights to Scotiabank.

During the 2020–21 NBA season, the Toronto Raptors relocated their home games to Amalie Arena in Tampa, Florida, due to the COVID-19 pandemic in Toronto. The Raptors played their first home game at Scotiabank Arena since the pandemic on October 20, 2021, losing to the Washington Wizards 98–83.

On May 11, 2021, Toronto Rock announced the relocation from Scotiabank Arena in Toronto to FirstOntario Centre (later renamed "TD Coliseum") in Hamilton, Ontario, beginning with the 2021–22 NLL season in December. The team retained the name "Toronto Rock" while in Hamilton.

On June 27, 2021, Scotiabank Arena was used as a COVID-19 vaccine pop-up clinic for 26,771 people. This clinic set a new record for the most COVID-19 vaccinations delivered at a single location in North America, beating out a pop-up drive-thru clinic that vaccinated 17,003 people at the Texas Motor Speedway in Fort Worth, Texas.

A multi-phase renovation of the arena valued at more than $350 million was announced in October 2023. Preliminary phases of the project, which included a new video screen in Maple Leaf Square, had begun in 2019. Subsequent phases were planned for the summers of 2023 and 2024, during the off-seasons of both the Maple Leafs and the Raptors, to rebuild and expand parts of the 100-level concourse and to introduce new concession formats, including grab-and-go/self-checkout kiosks and “Just Walk Out” outlets using Amazon Web Services technology with ID checks for alcohol purchases. Plans also included eventual replacement of seating and changes to portions of the upper concourse.

== Maple Leaf Square ==
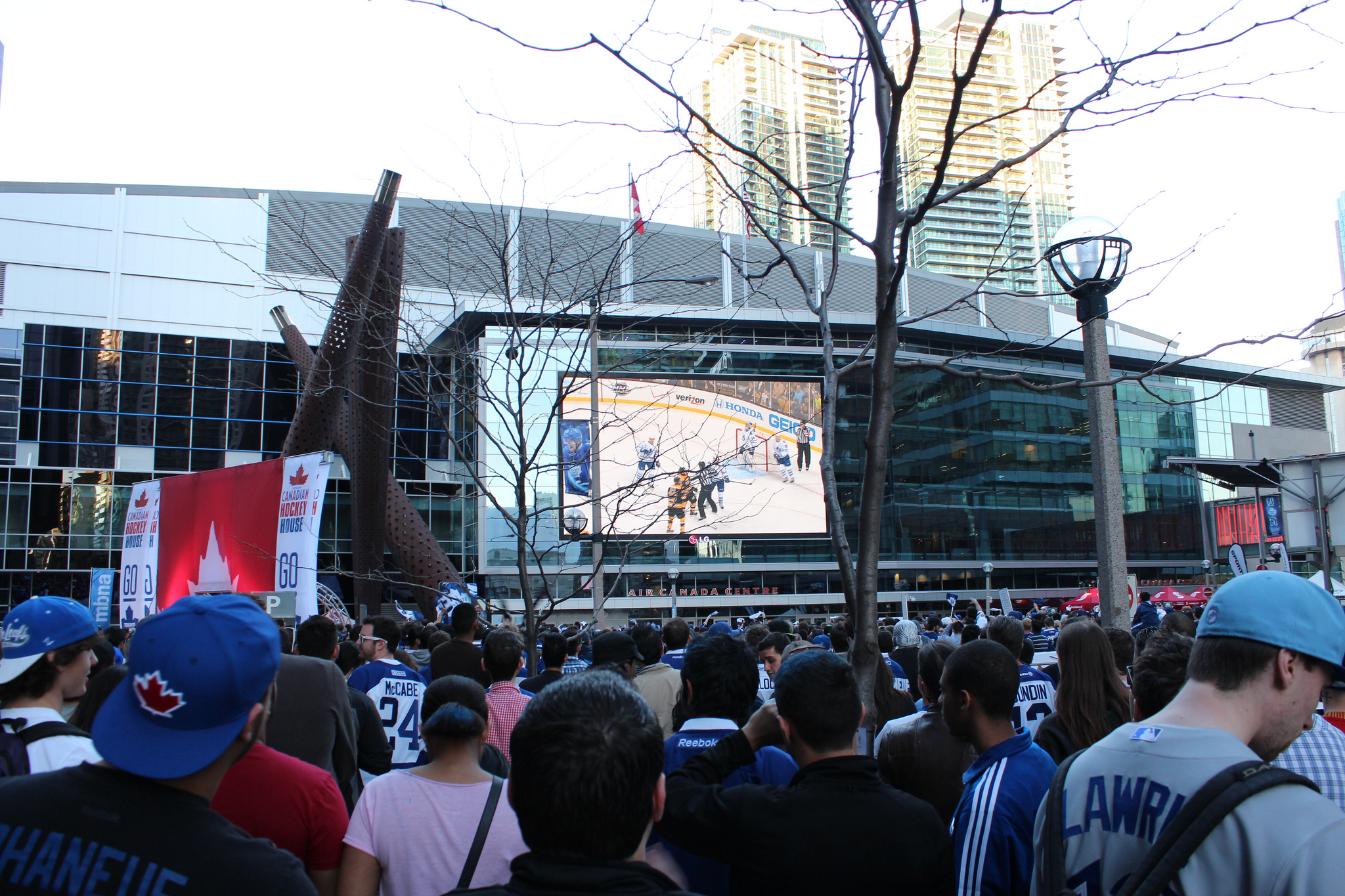
A popular gathering point during Maple Leafs and Raptors playoff runs, the arena has a large video screen that overlooks the atrium of Maple Leaf Square.

In late 2005, Maple Leaf Sports and Entertainment announced that they would be renovating the western side of the Air Canada Centre during the 2008 off-season to connect it with the Maple Leaf Square development. Maple Leaf Square is jointly owned by MLSE, Cadillac Fairview and Lanterra Developments. The $500 million development includes two restaurants, Hotel Le Germain at Maple Leaf Square boutique hotel, extensive retail shopping, including a 840-square-metre (9,000 sq ft) Leafs, Marlies, Raptors, and Toronto FC store, two 54-storey condominiums, a Longo's supermarket, and a public square. It opened in 2010. The two-year, $48 million renovation of the ACC added a new atrium that includes a High-Definition broadcast studio for Leafs Nation Network (formerly Leafs TV), NBA TV Canada and GolTV Canada.

The outside wall of the atrium features a 9.1-by-15.2-metre (30 by 50 ft) video screen overlooking the plaza, which often broadcasts games taking place inside the arena. During NHL and NBA playoff runs, the square attracts thousands of Leafs and Raptors fans, respectively, sometimes broadcasting away playoff matches featuring the Leafs and/or the Raptors as well. A section of the square is designated Ford Fan Zone at Maple Leaf Square, with naming rights given to the Ford Motor Company of Canada. During Raptors playoff runs, the square has acquired the nickname "Jurassic Park" after the 1993 film adaptation that inspired the team's name. During the 2019 NBA playoffs and especially during the victorious 2019 NBA Finals, other city squares across Canada also acquired the Jurassic Park nickname, such as in Halifax, Nova Scotia.

== Events ==
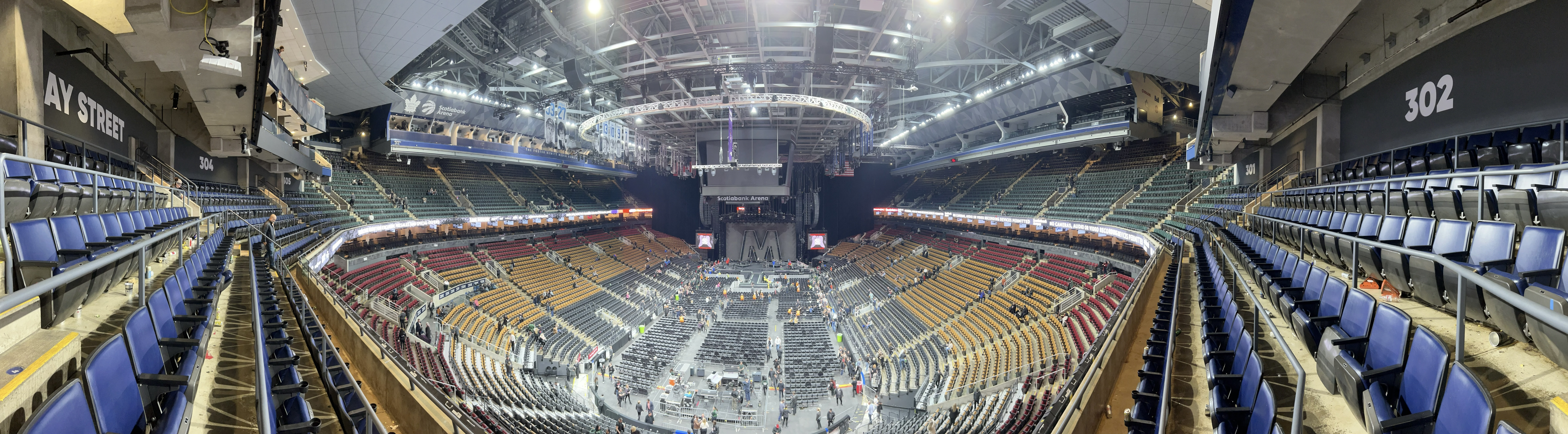
A panorama of the interior of Scotiabank Arena after a Depeche Mode concert.

=== Sports ===
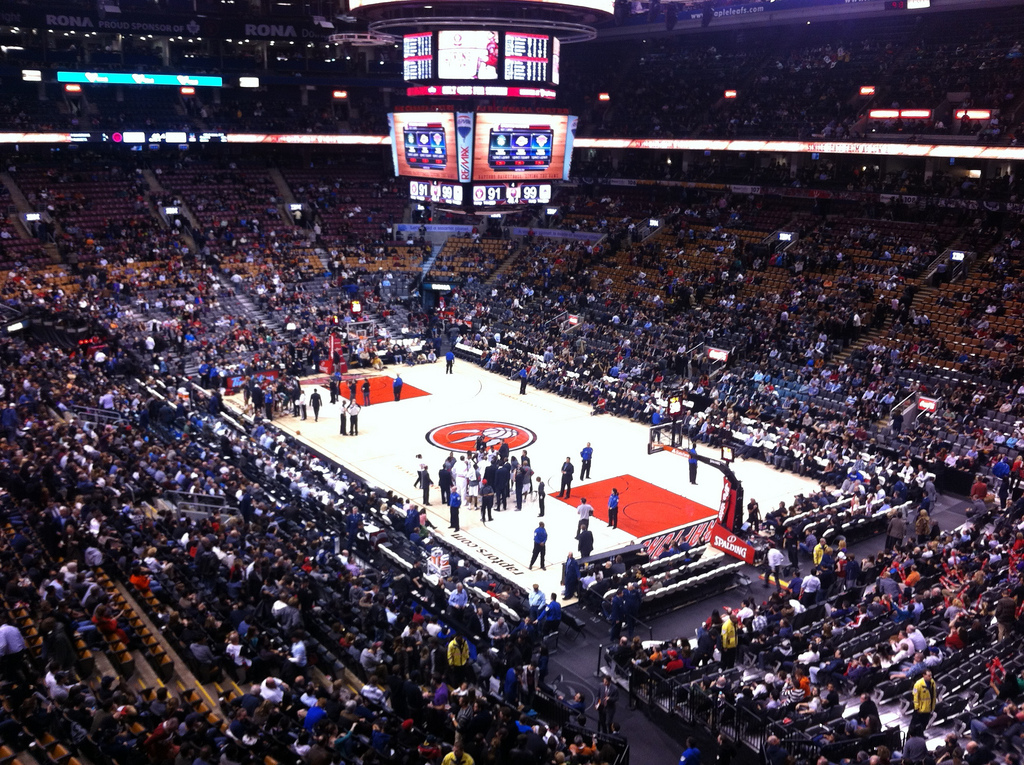
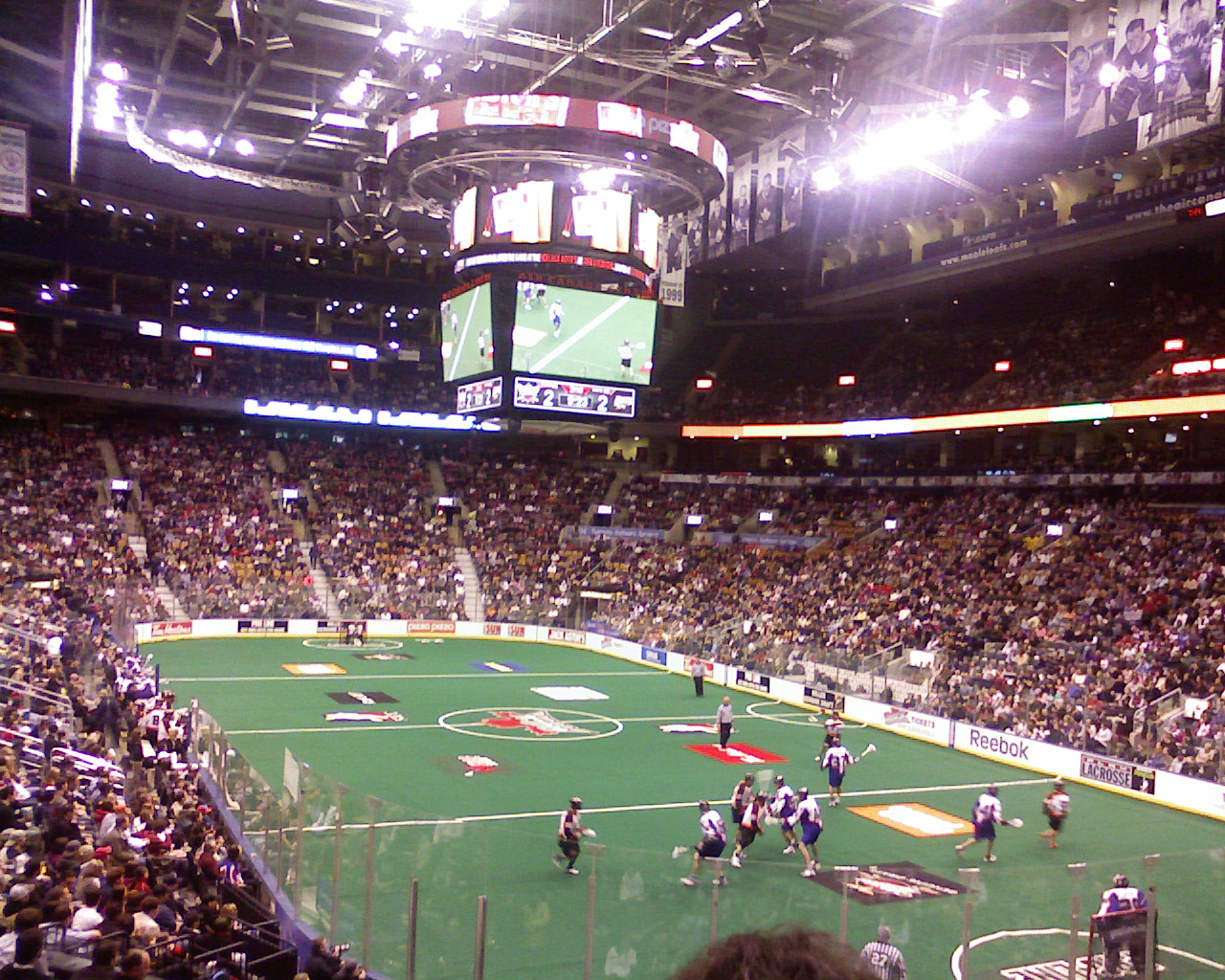
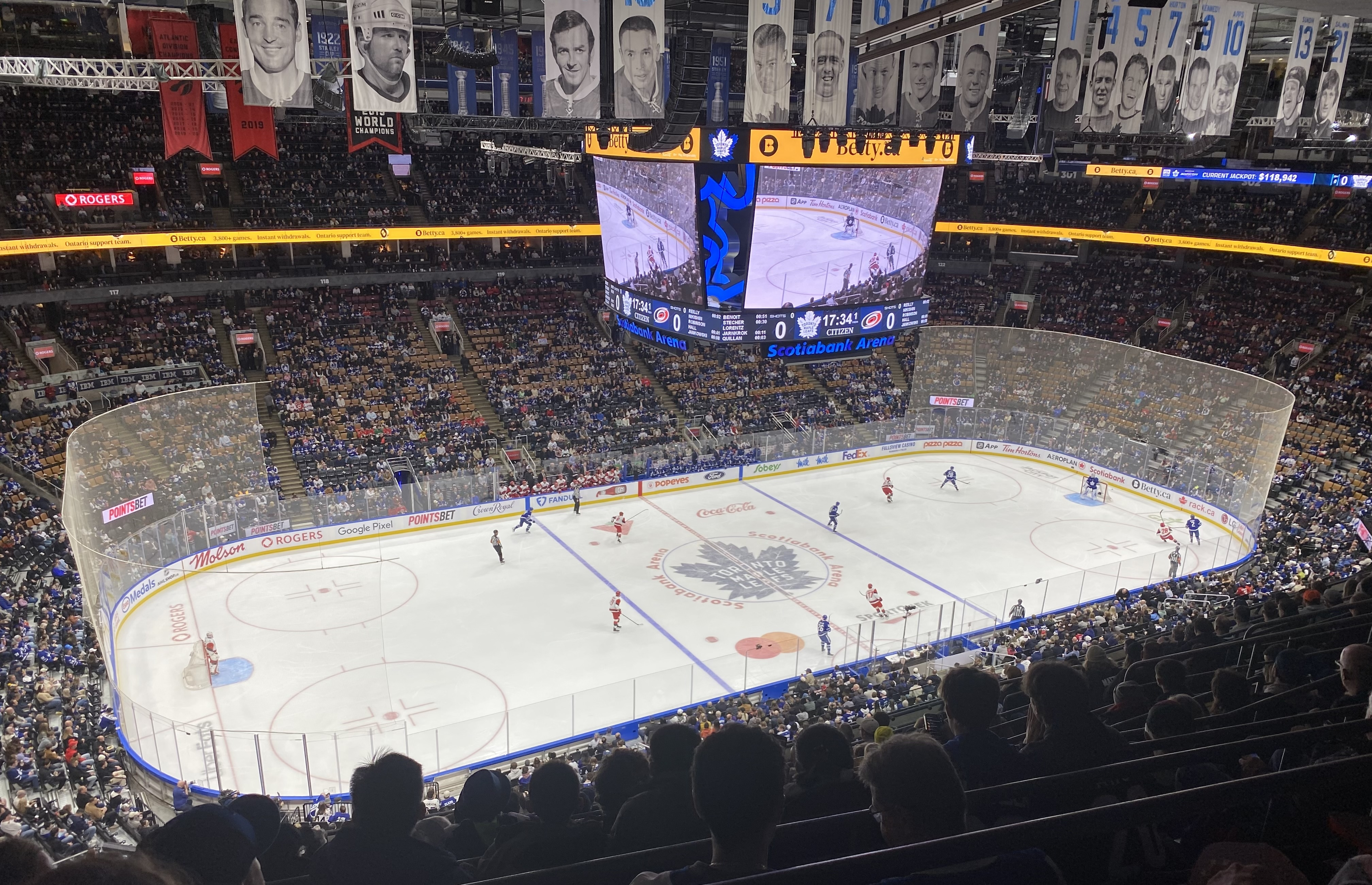
Scotiabank Arena is a multi-purpose arena that is able to host a number of sporting events, including basketball, box lacrosse, and ice hockey.

==== Hockey ====
Maple Leaf home games are generally sold out, and there is a waitlist since the start of 2015 for Season Ticket Holders for upcoming seasons.

- February 20, 1999 – First Toronto Maple Leafs game at their new home, versus the Montreal Canadiens. The Maple Leafs won 3–2 with an overtime goal by Steve Thomas. Todd Warriner of the Leafs scored the first goal ever at the new arena.
- February 6, 2000 – 2000 NHL All-Star Game
- June 22–23, 2002 – 2002 NHL entry draft
- 2004 World Cup of Hockey, 5 games of 19, including the championship game where Canada beat Finland 3–2.
- 2010 World Hockey Summit
- 2015 World Junior Ice Hockey Championships co-hosted with Montreal's Bell Centre. Hosted Group B, 2 quarterfinals, semifinals, and the medal rounds. Canada beat Russia 5–4 for the gold.
- 2016 World Cup of Hockey, all games, including the championship games where Canada beat Europe 3–1 and 2–1.
- 2017 World Junior Ice Hockey Championships co-hosted with Montreal's Bell Centre. Hosted Group B and 2 quarterfinals. Canada lost gold 4–5 to Team USA in a shootout in Montreal.
- 2019–20 Stanley Cup playoffs for the Eastern Conference due to the COVID-19 pandemic, including the eastern half of 24-team Stanley Cup Qualifiers rounds for the playoffs, as well as its first two rounds.
- February 3, 2024 – 2024 NHL All-Star Game
- February 16, 2024 – PWHL Toronto versus PWHL Montreal, also known as the "Battle On Bay Street," is the most attended women's hockey game of all time with an attendance of 19,285.
- January 25, 2025 – The Professional Women's Hockey League (PWHL) returns to Scotiabank Arena with a game between the Toronto Sceptres and New York Sirens.

==== Basketball ====
- February 21, 1999 – First Raptors game versus the then-Vancouver Grizzlies. The Raptors won 102–87 in front of a sold-out crowd.
- October 3, 2003 – Air Canada Centre had a power outage during the third quarter of a Raptors pre-season game against the Athens-based club Panathinaikos. The game was called final because the power was not restored in time and the Raptors already had a 30-point lead.
- 2016 NBA All-Star Game – The first NBA All-Star Game held outside of the United States.
- July 27, 2018 – Scotiabank Arena hosted week 6 of the 2018 Big3 season. Toronto was the lone non-American venue city to host a Big3 event.
- 2019 NBA Finals – Games 1, 2, and 5 versus the Golden State Warriors. The Raptors won the NBA championship 4–2, albeit in the Warriors' then-home arena of Oracle Arena in Oakland in Game 6.
- March 26, 2022 – A speaker above Section 103 of Scotiabank Arena caught on fire in a regular-season game between the Raptors and Indiana Pacers. The fire forced fans to evacuate the building and suspend the game for 70 minutes, before resuming the game at 9:30 P.M. (EDT) with no fan attendance. The Raptors would go on to win 131–91.
- June 27, 2026 – First regular season Women's National Basketball Association (WNBA) game at Scotiabank Arena between the Toronto Tempo and Phoenix Mercury.

==== Other sports ====
Lacrosse

The Toronto Rock also moved to the Air Canada Centre from Maple Leaf Gardens for the 2001 NLL season. The Rock's first game was a 17–7 win over the Ottawa Rebel on December 21, 2000. The Toronto Rock would later relocate to Hamilton's FirstOntario Centre, then to Paramount Fine Foods Centre (later renamed Mississauga Sports and Entertainment Centre) in Mississauga on a temporary basis while its Hamilton home underwent major renovation and renaming to TD Coliseum.

MMA

The arena has also played host to six Ultimate Fighting Championship (UFC) events.

Event	Date	Attendance
UFC 140	Saturday, December 10, 2011	18,303
UFC 152	Saturday, September 22, 2012	16,800
UFC 165	Saturday, September 21, 2013	15,504
UFC 206	Saturday, December 10, 2016	18,057
UFC 231	Saturday, December 8, 2018	19,039
UFC 297	Saturday, January 20, 2024	18,559

=== Concerts ===
Notable concerts at Air Canada Centre / Scotiabank Arena since 2003 include:

- July 29 & 31, 2003 – Justin Timberlake and Christina Aguilera – The Justified & Stripped Tour
- April 3, 2004 – Britney Spears – The Onyx Hotel Tour
- July 18–19 & 21, 2004 – Madonna – Re-Invention World Tour
- October 6, 2004 – Metallica – Madly in Anger with the World Tour
- April 5, 2005 – Duran Duran
- July 14, 2005 – Bruce Springsteen – Devils & Dust Tour
- September 12, 14, 16–17, 2005 – U2 – Vertigo Tour
- March 20, 2006 – Oasis – Don't Believe the Truth Tour
- November 7, 2006 – Bob Dylan – Never Ending Tour
- December 4, 2006 – The Who – The Who Tour 2006–2007
- February 8, 2007 – The Tragically Hip
- April 20, 2007 – Billy Joel
- May 30, 2007 – Gwen Stefani – The Sweet Escape Tour
- September 19 & 22, 2007 – Rush - Snakes & Arrows Tour
- December 6–7, 2007 & March 10, 12-13, 2008 – Bon Jovi - Lost Highway Tour
- January 21, 2008 – Ozzy Osbourne - Black Rain Tour
- April 7, 2008 – Avril Lavigne - The Best Damn Tour
- May 15, 2008 – The Cure
- March 18–19, 2009 – Britney Spears - The Circus Starring Britney Spears
- May 26 & 30, 2009 – Elton John & Billy Joel - Face to Face 2009
- June 16, 2009 – No Doubt - 2009 Summer Tour
- October 2, 2009 – Kiss - Alive 35 World Tour
- October 9, 2009 – Kylie Minogue - Kylie Minogue's 2009 North American tour
- October 26–27, 2009 – Metallica - World Magnetic Tour
- November 28, 2009, July 11 & 12, 2010, & March 3, 2011 – Lady Gaga - The Monster Ball Tour
- February 9, 2010 – Mariah Carey - Angels Advocate Tour
- March 10, 2010 – Alicia Keys - Freedom Tour
- May 21–22, 2010 – Taylor Swift - Fearless Tour
- August 8–9, 2010 – Paul McCartney - Up and Coming Tour
- June 29–30, 2011 – Katy Perry - California Dreams Tour
- July 15–16, 2011 – Taylor Swift - Speak Now World Tour
- April 25 & October 27, 2011 – Duran Duran - All You Need Is Now
- September 11–12, 2011 – Pearl Jam - Pearl Jam Twenty Tour
- November 23–24, 2011 – Jay-Z & Kanye West - Watch the Throne Tour
- March 17, 2012 – Van Halen - A Different Kind of Truth Tour
- April 27–28, 2012 – Red Hot Chili Peppers - I'm with You World Tour
- February 8–9, 2013 – Lady Gaga - Born This Way Ball
- February 14, 2013 – The Tragically Hip
- May 25 & June 6, 2013 – The Rolling Stones - 50 & Counting
- July 9–10, 2013 – One Direction - Take Me Home Tour
- August 24, 2013 – Selena Gomez - Stars Dance Tour
- December 22–23, 2013 – Kanye West - The Yeezus Tour
- February 13–14, 2014 – Justin Timberlake - The 20/20 Experience World Tour
- March 26, 2014 – Demi Lovato - The Neon Lights Tour
- July 9, 2014 – Lady Gaga - ArtRave: The Artpop Ball
- July 13 & 28, 2014 – Queen + Adam Lambert - Queen + Adam Lambert Tour 2014–2015
- September 18, 2014, & June 6 & September 20, 2015 – Ed Sheeran - x Tour
- March 8 & August 9, 2015 – Ariana Grande - The Honeymoon Tour
- July 6–7, 2015 – U2 - Innocence + Experience Tour
- October 5–6, 2015 – Madonna - Rebel Heart Tour
- October 17, 2015 – Paul McCartney - Out There
- November 3 & 5, 2015 – The Weeknd - The Madness Fall Tour
- May 10 & 12, 2016 – Pearl Jam - Pearl Jam 2016 North America Tour
- May 18–19, 2016 – Justin Bieber - Purpose World Tour
- July 23, 2016 – Demi Lovato & Nick Jonas - Future Now Tour
- July 31 – August 1 & October 8, 2016 – Drake & Future - Summer Sixteen Tour
- August 30–31, & December 18, 2016 – Kanye West - Saint Pablo Tour
- October 3–4 & 6–7, 2016 – Adele - Adele Live 2016
- November 3, 2016 – The 1975 - I Like It When You Sleep, for You Are So Beautiful yet So Unaware of It
- March 5, 2017 – Ariana Grande - Dangerous Woman Tour
- May 26–27 & September 9, 2017 – The Weeknd - Starboy: Legend of the Fall Tour
- July 5, 2017 – Bob Dylan - Never Ending Tour
- July 7–8, 2017 – Ed Sheeran - ÷ Tour
- July 18, 2017 – Queen + Adam Lambert - Queen + Adam Lambert Tour 2017–2018
- August 11–12, 2017 – Shawn Mendes - Illuminate World Tour
- August 26–27 & September 22–23, 2017 – Bruno Mars - 24K Magic World Tour
- September 6–7, 2017 – Lady Gaga - Joanne World Tour
- March 13 & 15, & October 9, 2018 – Justin Timberlake - The Man of the Woods Tour
- January 15, 2018 – Lana Del Rey - LA to the Moon Tour
- March 29, 2018 – Lorde - Melodrama World Tour
- June 16, 2018 – Harry Styles - Harry Styles: Live on Tour
- July 3, 2018 – Got7 - Eyes On You World Tour
- July 22, 2018 – Panic! at the Disco - Pray for the Wicked Tour
- August 7, 2018 – Shakira - El Dorado World Tour
- August 21–22, 2018 – Drake & Migos
- September 10, 2018 – Childish Gambino - This Is America Tour
- October 16, 2018 – Florence and the Machine - High as Hope Tour
- November 21, 2018 & March 7, 2019 – Travis Scott - Astroworld – Wish You Were Here Tour
- March 20 & August 17, 2019 & November 22, 2023 – Kiss - End of the Road World Tour
- April 3 & June 26, 2019 – Ariana Grande - Sweetener World Tour
- May 28, 2019 – Twenty One Pilots - The Bandito Tour
- June 30, 2019 – Got7 - Keep Spinning World Tour
- July 7–8, 2019 – Jennifer Lopez - It's My Party
- July 17, 2019 – Backstreet Boys - DNA World Tour
- September 3, 2019 – The Who - Moving On! Tour
- September 6, 2019 – Tyler, the Creator - Igor Tour
- October 3–4, 2019 & February 14, 2020 – Post Malone - Runaway Tour (Post Malone)
- October 8, 2019 – The Chainsmokers, 5 Seconds of Summer, & Lennon Stella - World War Joy Tour
- December 9–10, 2019 – Celine Dion - Courage World Tour
- March 9, 2022 – Tame Impala - The Slow Rush Tour
- March 11, 2022 – Tyler, the Creator - Call Me If You Get Lost Tour
- March 14, 2022 – Bad Bunny - El Último Tour del Mundo 2022
- March 25, 2022 – Justin Bieber - Justice World Tour
- July 21 & 23, 2022 – Rage Against the Machine - Public Service Announcement Tour
- July 27, 2022 – Dua Lipa - Future Nostalgia Tour
- August 12–13, 2022 – Kendrick Lamar - The Big Steppers Tour
- August 15–16, 2022 – Harry Styles - Love On Tour
- August 27, 2022 – Twenty One Pilots - The Icy Tour
- September 11, 2022 – Daddy Yankee - La Última Vuelta World Tour
- September 14, 2022 – Kid Cudi - To the Moon World Tour
- September 20–21, 2022 – Post Malone - Twelve Carat Tour
- December 9 & 11, 2022 – Mariah Carey - Merry Christmas to All!
- December 12, 2022 – The 1975 - At Their Very Best
- February 25, 2023 – SZA - SOS Tour
- July 14, 2023 – Alicia Keys - Keys to the Summer Tour
- September 18, 2023 – The Chicks - The Chicks Tour
- October 6–7, 2023 – Drake, 21 Savage, & J. Cole - It's All a Blur Tour
- November 18, 2023 – The 1975 - Still... At Their Very Best
- November 27, 2023 – Mariah Carey - Merry Christmas One and All!
- December 11, 2023 – Doja Cat - The Scarlet Tour
- December 29, 2023 & January 6, 2024 – Travis Scott - Circus Maximus Tour
- January 11–12, 2024 – Madonna - The Celebration Tour
- March 29–30, 2024 – Olivia Rodrigo - Guts World Tour
- April 4, 2024 – Bad Bunny - Most Wanted Tour
- April 18 & 30, 2024 – Nicki Minaj - Pink Friday 2 World Tour
- August 11, 2024 – Future & Metro Boomin - We Trust You Tour
- August 18, 2024 – Childish Gambino - The New World Tour
- September 2–3, 2024 – Usher - Usher: Past Present Future
- September 18, 2024 – Charli XCX & Troye Sivan - Sweat
- September 25, 2024 & November 10–11, 2025 – Sabrina Carpenter - Short n' Sweet Tour
- November 3 & 6, 2024 – Bruce Springsteen & E Street Band - Springsteen and E Street Band 2023–2025 Tour
- November 14, 2024 – Don Toliver - Psycho Tour
- August 3, 2025 – Ado - Hibana World Tour
- September 10–11 & 13, 2025 – Lady Gaga - The Mayhem Ball
- September 17, 2025 – Kali Uchis - The Sincerely, Tour

=== Political conventions ===
In 2003, the governing Liberal Party of Canada held their leadership convention at the Air Canada Centre. Paul Martin was elected as the new leader of the party and thus also became prime minister, succeeding Jean Chrétien.

=== Other events ===
==== Invictus Games opening and closing ceremonies ====
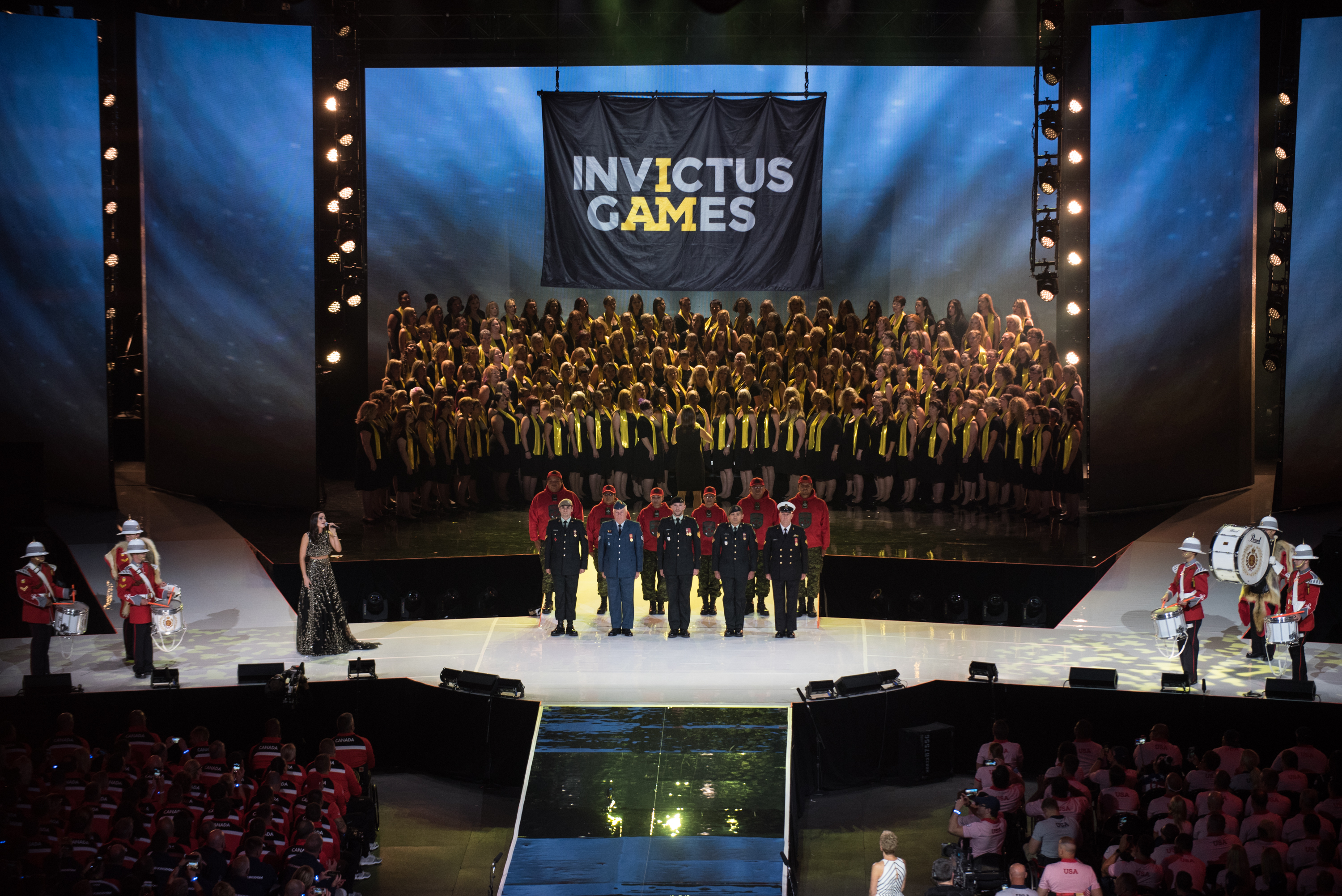
Flag raising during the 2017 Invictus Games closing ceremonies

In 2017, the Air Canada Centre hosted the opening and closing ceremonies for that year's Invictus Games. On September 23, 2017, the ACC presented the opening ceremony as a live two-hour event spectacular. This ceremony was designed to welcome and honour the 550 competitors and their families who come from 17 different competing nations. The show featured hundreds of cast members, including honorary men and women from the Canadian Armed Forces. The cast showed a display of ceremony in multiple different productions and the raising of the flag. Other guests of the event included celebrities, world dignitaries, headline music stars and other special guests. They gathered to celebrate the service and stories of the members of the 2017 Invictus Games. Headline performers included Laura Wright, Alessia Cara, The Tenors, Sarah McLachlan, and La Bottine Souriante.

The ACC hosted the Invictus Games Toronto 2017 closing ceremony on September 20, 2017. The event featured an arrangement of international headline music artists, coming together to celebrate and recognize the Invictus Games competitors. The closing ceremony featured headline musical guests Bachman & Turner, Bryan Adams, Coeur de Pirate, Bruce Springsteen, and Kelly Clarkson. This celebration also included words from world dignitaries as the Games are passed to the host nation of the Invictus Games 2018, Sydney, Australia.

==== Miscellaneous events ====
The venue hosted Monster Jam on June 21–23, 2019.

=== Video game competitions ===
On August 27 and 28, 2016, Air Canada Centre hosted the sixth season of the Summer North American Championship Series of League of Legends (LoL), marking the first professional League of Legends competition in Canada. League of Legends is a popular multiplayer online battle arena (MOBA) computer game by American video game developer Riot Games; League of Legends competitions are among the most viewed among professional video game competitions worldwide. During the final round, Team SoloMid (TSM) defeated Cloud9 (C9) three matches to one in a best-of-five format. The Summer North American Championship Series serve as the qualifiers for the annual World Championship for North American teams.

In 2022, the arena was originally poised to host the semifinals of that year's League of Legends World Championship. However, due to the COVID-19 pandemic impacting the viability of securing multi-entry visas for cross-border travel, the semifinals were moved to the State Farm Arena in Atlanta.

== See also ==
- List of music venues in Toronto

Events and tenants
Preceded by SkyDome	Home of the Toronto Raptors; 1999–present	Succeeded by current
Preceded by Maple Leaf Gardens	Home of the Toronto Maple Leafs; 1999–present	Succeeded by current
Preceded by Maple Leaf Gardens	Home of the Toronto Rock; 2000–2021	Succeeded by FirstOntario Centre
Preceded by Hartford Civic Center	Home of the Toronto Phantoms; 2001–2002	Succeeded by last arena
Preceded by St. Pete Times Forum; FLA Live Arena	Host of the NHL All-Star Game; 2000; 2024	Succeeded by Pepsi Center; UBS Arena
Preceded by Madison Square Garden	Host of the NBA All-Star Game; 2016	Succeeded by Smoothie King Center
