= Full-time =

Full-time or Full Time may refer to:

- Full-time job, employment in which a person works a minimum number of hours defined as such by their employer
- Full-time mother, a woman whose work is running or managing her family's home
- Full-time father, a father who is the main caregiver of the children and is generally the homemaker of the household
- Full-time equivalent, a unit that indicates the workload of an employed person or student
- Full-time (sports), the end of the game
- Full Time (film), a 2021 French film directed by Éric Gravel

== See also ==
- Part-time (disambiguation)
