= Head West =

Studio album by Bob Welch / Head West
- Released: 1970
- Genres: Funk, soul, rock
- Length: 38:01
- Label: Vogue (France)

Bob Welch / Head West chronology
Head West (1970)	French Kiss (1977)

Head West is a self-titled album released in 1970 by the American band Head West, who were based in Paris, France. The band are best known today for their vocalist/guitarist Bob Welch, who went on to join Fleetwood Mac in 1971. Since 1973, by which time Welch had become more well-known, the album was repackaged as more of a solo album, credited to Bob Welch with Head West. Singles were also released but with little success.

After Head West had split up, organist Bobby Hunt toured with Fleetwood Mac and as a back up keyboard player for Christine McVie in 1974. After Welch had left Fleetwood Mac, he and Hunt recorded demos for Warner Bros. which were then developed into the Paris power trio project.

The iconic drumbeat of the seventh track, "Attention", has been sampled by several other recording artistes–– most notably Gorillaz on the track "New Genious (Brother)" from their self-titled 2001 debut album, and on the opening track "Igor's Theme" on rapper Tyler, the Creator's 2019 album, Igor. It was also sampled as well on professional wrestler and actor John Cena's theme song, "The Time Is Now", which was in use since 2005.

== Track listing ==
1. "Head West" (Henry Moore, Bob Welch, Robert Hunt) – 3:42
2. "People" (Hunt, Winston Gray) – 2:03
3. "Hurry Up" (Moore, Welch, Hunt) – 2:30
4. "Changes" (Moore, Hunt) – 2:54
5. "Tired of Hangin' On" (Moore) – 5:49
6. "Faces" (Moore, Hunt) – 2:58
7. "Attention" (Hunt) – 3:22
8. "Czar" (Welch, Hunt) – 2:51
9. "Someday" (Welch) – 3:08
10. "Straight Down" (Moore) – 3:44
11. "Starchild" (Welch) – 3:24
12. "Costalarico" (Moore, Welch, Hunt) – 3:17

=== Single ===
- "Victoria" (Binkley, Welch) – 3:49 / "Changes" – 2:55
- Vogue DV 11004, Germany, 1970, PS

== Credits ==
- Bob Welch – vocals, guitar, bass guitar
- Robert Hunt – vocals, organ
- Henry Moore – vocals, drums, percussion
