= A Boy Is a Gun =

Song by Tyler, the Creator

from the album Igor
- Released: May 17, 2019
- Genre: Alternative hip hop; neo soul; R&B
- Length: 3:30
- Label: Columbia
- Songwriters: Tyler Okonma; Bobby Dukes; Bobby Massey; Lester Allen McKenzie
- Producer: Tyler Okonma

Music video
- "A Boy Is a Gun" on YouTube

"A Boy Is a Gun" (stylized as "A BOY IS A GUN*") is a song by American rapper and producer Tyler, the Creator from his sixth album Igor. The song was written by Tyler, the Creator with multiple producers. Released on May 17, 2019, beside the other songs in the album, it charted in the Billboard Hot 100, the US Hot R&B/Hip-Hop Songs, and the Canadian Hot 100. The song also gained a platinum certification from the Recording Industry Association of America and a gold certification from Music Canada. An accompanying music video directed by Tyler himself is centered around Igor–Tyler's alter ego. Igor is interested in a love interest, while the latter is disinterested.

== Background and composition ==
Since day one, I’ve always wanted to make the prettiest shit that’s borderline boring,
or the hardest fucking shit, And I’ve been trying to mix those together since my first album.

— Tyler Okonma,

The song is inspired by the 1971 French western film Une Aventure de Billy le Kid, also known as "A Girl is a Gun". "A girl is a gun" was popularized by a clothing brand, Pleasure, which printed the phrase in shirts. The phrase was further popularized when Playboi Carti wore it in his single "Magnolia". The video style is inspired by another movie, 2017's Call Me by Your Name, of which Tyler is a fan. The track samples from "Bound", by the Ponderosa Twins Plus One, with vocals from Solange Knowles. Tyler has history with the sample, co-producing "Bound 1", which was ultimately reworked and released as "Bound 2" by Kanye West.

== Promotion ==
In the days leading up to the song's release, Tyler, the Creator released a short promotional video in which his Igor character slowly climbs up a ladder seemingly reaching infinitely into the sky, as a slightly distorted version of the song plays in the background. At the video's end, Igor calmly falls off the ladder.

== Music video and lyrics ==
The director of the music video is listed as Wolf Haley in the credits, which is an alias of Tyler Okonma. The video follows Igor, Tyler's alter ego throughout a mansion and its grounds, walking around the balcony, ending up in a bathtub. He interacts with an apparent male love interest throughout, though the man appears "disinterested" in him. After, Igor appears to have a mental breakdown, throwing clothes and running across the lawn. The final scene is of Igor's lover leaving in a limo with his girlfriend. Igor runs out after him, but misses him and puts his head on the ground as he cries.

== Critical reception ==
The song received relatively positive reviews from critics, with American magazine Pitchfork stating that the song was where Tyler is at his "most creative", with the end stating that the song ended unnaturally. Furthermore, the song was praised for its varied tone and tempo, reflecting the "volatility" of Tyler's feelings. The song was described containing "minimalist, looping, eyes-to-the-sky aesthetic" by the music website Sputnikmusic. British website NME stated that the song "puts its own majestic spin" on the Ponderosa Twins Plus One track, Bound.

== Personnel ==
=== Music ===
- Tyler Okonma - Writer and performer
- Bobby Massey - Sample producer (Bound) and songwriter
- Kanye West - Sample creator (Bound 1 and 2)

=== Video ===
- Wolf Haley (Tyler Okonma) - Director

== Charts ==
Chart performance for "A Boy Is a Gun"
Chart (2019)	Peak position
Australia (ARIA)	56
Australian Urban (ARIA)	19
Canada Hot 100 (Billboard)	75
Latvia (LaIPA)	17
Lithuania (AGATA)	28
Portugal (AFP)	73
UK Audio Streaming (Official Charts)	78
US Billboard Hot 100	74
US Hot R&B/Hip-Hop Songs (Billboard)	36

== Certifications ==
Certifications for "A Boy Is a Gun"
Region	Certification	Certified units/sales
Canada (Music Canada)	Gold	40,000^{‡}
New Zealand (RMNZ)	Gold	15,000^{‡}
United States (RIAA)	Platinum	1,000,000^{‡}
^{‡} Sales+streaming figures based on certification alone.
