= Gone, Gone / Thank You =

2019 song by Tyler, the Creator

Song by Tyler, the Creator

from the album Igor
- Written: 2013
- Released: May 17, 2019
- Recorded: 2018–2019
- Genre: Alternative R&B; neo-soul; indie pop; alternative hip hop
- Length: 6:15
- Label: Columbia
- Songwriters: Tyler Okonma; Cullen Omori; Alan O'Day; Tatsuro Yamashita
- Producers: Tyler, the Creator

"Gone, Gone / Thank You" (stylized in all caps) is a song by American rapper and producer Tyler, the Creator and the tenth track from his sixth studio album Igor (2019). It features background vocals from American singer CeeLo Green. The song contains excerpts from "Hey Girl" by Cullen Omori of Smith Westerns and interpolations from "Fragile" by Tatsuro Yamashita.

== Background ==
Tyler, the Creator produced the beat and had the idea for the song in 2013 while on tour for his album Wolf. He chose not to use the song for Cherry Bomb or Flower Boy since he felt it did not fit either of these albums.

The song continues the trend of the 10th song on each of Okonma’s albums being a multi-part song.

== Composition and lyrics ==
Randall Roberts of Los Angeles Times called the style of the song "hallucinatory beat music", while Adam Turner-Heffer of Under the Radar described it as reminiscent of OutKast. The song contains acoustic guitars and a "multi-layered falsetto chorus", which Sputnikmusic's Rowan5215 commented "somehow sounds like Brian Wilson working with BROCKHAMPTON". In the first part, Tyler, the Creator addresses his lover, who has left him for a female partner whom Tyler believes he is better than, and also blames himself for the end of their relationship. He shifts his tone in the second part, in which he thanks his former partner for the love and joy from their past relationship and declares he never wants to fall in love again, in a "cheerfully delivered" refrain despite his sadness.

== Critical reception ==
Gone, Gone / Thank You received critical acclaim, with many citing it as the highlight of Igor (2019). Nick Rosebade of Clash gave a positive review of the song, considering it "standout track" from Igor and stating it "shows that Tyler is capable of writing dazzling pop." Dean Van Nguyen of The Guardian commented the repetition of the lyrics "my love is gone" in the song "comes off as perfunctory." In an album review, Steven Edelstone of Paste regarded the song (along with "Are We Still Friends?") as "way-too-long", adding that they "play like tracks that missed the cut for Flower Boy, tracks that feel a bit too like sketches that were never fully fleshed out." It is widely regarded as one of Tyler The Creator's best songs.

== Charts ==
Chart performance for "Gone, Gone / Thank You"
Chart (2019)	Peak position
Australia (ARIA)	79
Australian Urban (ARIA)	30
Latvia (LaIPA)	25
Lithuania (AGATA)	34
Portugal (AFP)	92
US Bubbling Under Hot 100 (Billboard)	13

== Certifications ==
Certifications for "Gone, Gone / Thank You"
Region	Certification	Certified units/sales
Canada (Music Canada)	Platinum	80,000^{‡}
New Zealand (RMNZ)	Platinum	30,000^{‡}
Poland (ZPAV)	Gold	25,000^{‡}
United Kingdom (BPI)	Silver	200,000^{‡}
United States (RIAA)	2× Platinum	2,000,000^{‡}
^{‡} Sales+streaming figures based on certification alone.
