= New Magic Wand =

2019 song by Tyler, the Creator

Song by Tyler, the Creator

from the album Igor
- Released: May 17, 2019
- Genre: Alternative R&B; experimental hip hop; synth-funk; neo-soul
- Length: 3:16
- Label: Columbia
- Songwriter: Tyler Okonma
- Producer: Tyler, the Creator

Music video
- "New Magic Wand" on YouTube

"New Magic Wand" (stylized in all caps) is a song by American rapper and producer Tyler, the Creator from his sixth studio album Igor (2019). It incorporates elements of "Vsichni Praznj" by Siluetes 61 and features background vocals from American singer Santigold.

== Composition and lyrics ==
Jon Caramanica of The New York Times regarded the song to be "like an industrial-funk reimagining of Miami bass music." The beat contains a mixture of synthesizer, which has been described as "harsh hitting", "bassy", "shuddering" and "spooky", a "staticky, low-thrumming bass" and "dizzying percussions". It also switches at one point. The production also uses "candied keys" and "harmonizing vocals". Tyler also described the song as "a perfected version" of "French!" from his debut mixtape Bastard (2009).

The lyrics deal with unrequited love, as Tyler, the Creator expresses his love toward a former partner, whom he also resents for having chosen another person over him, as well as his jealous and possessive feelings. He mentions seeing a photo of the couple while thinking "I need to get her out the picture / She's really fuckin' up my frame". Later, Tyler performs in high-pitched vocals, during which Tyler tells his romantic interest "Your other one evaporate, we celebrate / You under oath, now pick a side". The song also features a brief spoken-word line from comedian Jerrod Carmichael.

== Critical reception ==
The song was well-received by music critics. Roisin O'Connor of The Independent considered it a standout from Igor. Clash's Nick Rosebade wrote of the song, "This has the most abrasive and Tyler-esque [sic] vibes. Filthy beats and basslines remind us that he's still as devastating as before." Sputnikmusic's Rowan5215 considered it among the album's "much superior retries of Cherry Bomb's industrial distortion-rap". Daniel Spielberger of HipHopDX called the song a "dreary masterpiece". Steven Edelstone of Paste described the song as particularly using a "heavier, more menacing" instrumental, before stating that the beat change "ranks as one of the best of the decade, rivaling that of Kendrick Lamar's frenzied conclusion to 'DNA.'"

== Music video ==
The music video was released on May 14, 2019. It sees Tyler, the Creator wearing an all-yellow outfit and blonde wig in a bowl cut hairstyle, and opens with him performing on a stage with a blue backdrop, starting from the song's repeating lyrics "Please don't leave me now". Soon, the camera zooms out to reveal Tyler performing in a desert to an audience of five moshing people. He is then seen running off into the distance.

== Charts ==
Chart performance for "New Magic Wand"
Chart (2019)	Peak position
Australia (ARIA)	53
Australian Urban (ARIA)	18
Canada (Canadian Hot 100)	73
Latvia (LaIPA)	13
Lithuania (AGATA)	19
Portugal (AFP)	63
Slovakia (Singles Digitál Top 100)	99
UK Audio Streaming (OCC)	72
US Billboard Hot 100	70
US Hot R&B/Hip-Hop Songs (Billboard)	34

== Certifications ==
Certifications for "New Magic Wand"
Region	Certification	Certified units/sales
Canada (Music Canada)	Platinum	80,000^{‡}
New Zealand (RMNZ)	Platinum	30,000^{‡}
Poland (ZPAV)	Platinum	50,000^{‡}
United Kingdom (BPI)	Gold	400,000^{‡}
United States (RIAA)	2× Platinum	2,000,000^{‡}
^{‡} Sales+streaming figures based on certification alone.
