= I Think =

2019 song by Tyler, the Creator

Song by Tyler, the Creator

from the album Igor
- Released: May 17, 2019
- Recorded: 2018
- Studio: Villa Batell (Lake Como)
- Genre: Alternative R&B; post-disco; alt pop; synth-pop; neo soul; funk
- Length: 3:32
- Label: Columbia
- Songwriters: Tyler Okonma; Bodiono Nkono Télesphore; Bibi Mascel
- Producers: Tyler, the Creator

Music video
- "I Think" on YouTube

"I Think" (stylized in all caps) is a song by American rapper and producer Tyler, the Creator, released as the third track from his fifth studio album Igor (2019). The song features additional vocals from American singer Solange, as well as background vocals from singers Ryan Beatty, Anthony Evans, Amanda Brown and Tiffany Stevenson.

The song was recorded in Lake Como, Italy.

== Composition ==
In the song, Tyler, the Creator questions his feelings and a relationship he has, stating: "I don't know where I'm going / But I know what I'm showing / Feelings, that's what I'm pouring / What the fuck is your motive?" The song also begins to reveal the signs of Tyler's unhealthy attachment to his love interest, commenting: "I'm your puppet, you are Jim Henson" Henson being the founder of the Muppets franchise. He also makes a reference to the novel turned film Call Me by Your Name ("Man, I wish you would call me / By your name cause I'm sorry").

The song takes heavy inspiration from Nigerian funk records. Both the chord progression and the chorus ("I think I'm falling in love / This time I think it's for real") are derived from the 1982 song "Special Lady" by Bibi Mascel. The drum loop is sampled from the 1982 Nkono Teles song "Get Down."

== Music video ==
A music video for the song was released on October 24, 2019. Directed by Tyler, the Creator (under his alias Wolf Haley), the video is about two minutes long. It opens in a bathroom, where a group of people are playing dice and a couple comes out of a stall. Tyler, wearing a pastel "color-block" suit, blonde wig and shades, observes himself in the mirror. He is shoved out of the bathroom by dice players. After brushing himself off, he chases after someone of his affection, moving through a crowd at a dance party. Eventually, Tyler gives up and goes for taking pictures. Kendall Jenner makes a cameo, as one of the attendees posing for pictures. Wyatt and Fletcher Shears of the Garden also make an appearance as people having their photo taken. Tyler becomes lonely, until the man he was looking for comes and taps him on the shoulder. Tyler looks up, and the video ends.

== Charts ==
Chart performance for "I Think"
Chart (2019)	Peak position
Australia (ARIA)	30
Australian Urban (ARIA)	9
Canada Hot 100 (Billboard)	51
Czech Republic Singles Digital (ČNS IFPI)	97
Ireland (IRMA)	28
Latvia (LaIPA)	7
Lithuania (AGATA)	9
New Zealand (Recorded Music NZ)	30
Portugal (AFP)	43
Slovakia Singles Digital (ČNS IFPI)	62
Sweden Heatseeker (Sverigetopplistan)	6
Switzerland (Schweizer Hitparade)	96
UK Singles (Official Charts)	30
UK Hip Hop/R&B (Official Charts)	12
US Billboard Hot 100	51
US Hot R&B/Hip-Hop Songs (Billboard)	22

== Certifications ==
Certifications for "I Think"
Region	Certification	Certified units/sales
Canada (Music Canada)	Platinum	80,000^{‡}
New Zealand (RMNZ)	Platinum	30,000^{‡}
United Kingdom (BPI)	Silver	200,000^{‡}
United States (RIAA)	Platinum	1,000,000^{‡}
^{‡} Sales+streaming figures based on certification alone.
