= Earfquake =

2019 single by Tyler, the Creator

- Channel Tres remix cover art

Single by Tyler, the Creator

from the album Igor
- Released: June 4, 2019
- Recorded: May 2017
- Genre: R&B; neo-soul; alternative hip hop
- Length: 3:10
- Label: Columbia
- Songwriters: Tyler Okonma; Jordan Carter
- Producer: Tyler Okonma

Tyler, the Creator singles chronology
"Potato Salad" (2018)	"Earfquake" (2019)	"U Say" (2019)

Music video
- "Earfquake" on YouTube

"Earfquake" (stylized in all caps) is a song by American rapper and producer Tyler, the Creator. It is the second song from his sixth studio album, Igor (2019). It features an uncredited guest appearance from fellow American rapper Playboi Carti and background vocals by American singers Charlie Wilson and Jessy Wilson. It was released as the album's lead single to rhythmic contemporary radio on June 4, 2019. Its official remix by Channel Tres was released on October 4, 2019. "Earfquake" was Tyler, the Creator's highest-charting song in the US at the time, peaking at number 13 on the Billboard Hot 100. It was also ranked 14th on Billboard's 100 Best Songs of 2019 list.

== Background ==
Tyler initially wrote the song for Canadian singer Justin Bieber, who turned down the song. Tyler then asked Barbadian singer Rihanna to provide vocals to the hook believing the song would be big, but she also rejected the song. Tyler instead kept in his own raw vocals. "Earfquake" was initially leaked online on May 7, 2019.

== Chart performance ==
The song peaked at number 13 on the US Billboard Hot 100 chart and performed well in various other countries and was also certified Platinum by the RIAA, indicating over a million units sold in the United States. "Earfquake" passed 1 billion plays on Spotify in August 2024.

== Composition ==
The song contains background vocals by Charlie Wilson and Jessy Wilson. A remix featuring Channel Tres was released as well.

== Music video ==
A music video for "Earfquake" was released alongside the album's release on May 17, 2019. The music video was directed by Tyler.

Tyler, the Creator performing "Earfquake" under his "Igor" character in the music video.

=== Synopsis ===
The video opens with a talk show host, named Pearl Edwards, played by Tracee Ellis Ross. She introduces Tyler, dressed as his alter ego Igor in a blue suit and a Warholian wig, and shares a rather stilted and awkward conversation with him (she asks for his name, which is censored with a bleep, and when she inquires about what he does, he simply says "yes"). Tyler then takes the stage, dancing and singing. He then plays his piano, but when Playboi Carti's verse starts, the set is already on fire, caused by his cigarette. He suffers various burns and then passes out. Tyler then returns as a firefighter to put out the fire. As he sings into the camera, it shakes and collapses as the video abruptly cuts off.

== Personnel ==
Credits adapted from Tidal and liner notes.

- Tyler Okonma – lead vocals, production, recording
- Jordan Carter – featured vocals
- Charlie Wilson – background vocals
- Jessy Wilson – background vocals
- Vic Wainstein – recording
- Ashley Jacobson – recording assistance
- Thomas Cullison – recording assistance
- Treveon Vaughn – recording assistance

== Charts ==
=== Weekly charts ===
Chart (2019)	Peak position
Australia (ARIA)	9
Austria (Ö3 Austria Top 40)	67
Belgium (Ultratop 50 Flanders)	49
Belgium (Ultratip Bubbling Under Wallonia)	33
Canada Hot 100 (Billboard)	16
Czech Republic Singles Digital (ČNS IFPI)	47
Denmark (Tracklisten)	18
France (SNEP)	157
Hungary (Stream Top 40)	31
Ireland (IRMA)	18
Latvia (LAIPA)	4
Lithuania (AGATA)	5
Netherlands (Single Top 100)	78
New Zealand (Recorded Music NZ)	8
Norway (VG-lista)	32
Portugal (AFP)	17
Slovakia Singles Digital (ČNS IFPI)	20
Sweden (Sverigetopplistan)	59
Switzerland (Schweizer Hitparade)	42
UK Singles (Official Charts)	17
UK Hip Hop/R&B (Official Charts)	5
US Billboard Hot 100	13
US Hot R&B/Hip-Hop Songs (Billboard)	5
US Rhythmic Airplay (Billboard)	28
US Rolling Stone Top 100	24

=== Year-end charts ===
Chart (2019)	Position
Latvia (LAIPA)	76
US Hot R&B/Hip-Hop Songs (Billboard)	46
US Rolling Stone Top 100	91

== Certifications ==
Region	Certification	Certified units/sales
Australia (ARIA)	Platinum	70,000^{‡}
Canada (Music Canada)	3× Platinum	240,000^{‡}
Denmark (IFPI Danmark)	Platinum	90,000^{‡}
France (SNEP)	Gold	100,000^{‡}
Italy (FIMI)	Gold	50,000^{‡}
Mexico (AMPROFON)	3× Platinum	180,000^{‡}
New Zealand (RMNZ)	3× Platinum	90,000^{‡}
Poland (ZPAV)	Platinum	50,000^{‡}
Spain (Promusicae)	Gold	30,000^{‡}
United Kingdom (BPI)	Platinum	600,000^{‡}
United States (RIAA)	5× Platinum	5,000,000^{‡}
^{‡} Sales+streaming figures based on certification alone.
