= Part Time (band) =

American pop band

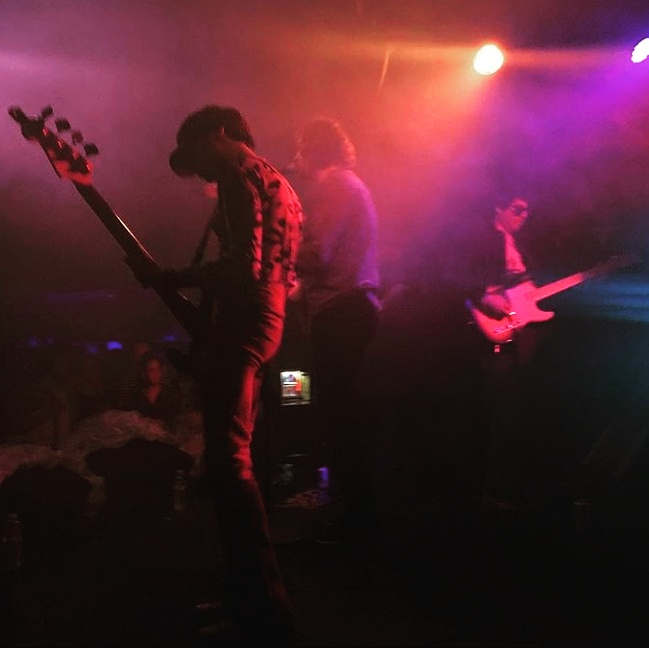
- Part Time performing in Los Angeles, 2013

Background information
- Origin: San Francisco, U.S.
- Genres: Pop; lo-fi; synth-pop; new wave; soft rock; psychedelic pop; bedroom pop; New Romantic
- Years active: 1990s-present
- Labels: Mexican Summer; Burger
- Past members: David Loca; Wally Byers; Robert Dozal; Billy Trujillo; Tony Leal

Part Time (stylized as PARTIME) is an American pop band that was fronted by California-based musician David Loca (also credited as David Speck). Loca produced and wrote virtually all of the band's output, with most of their studio recordings created alone at his home. AllMusic critic Tim Sendra described the music as "equal part psychedelic pop, soft rock, and primitive synth pop."

== History ==
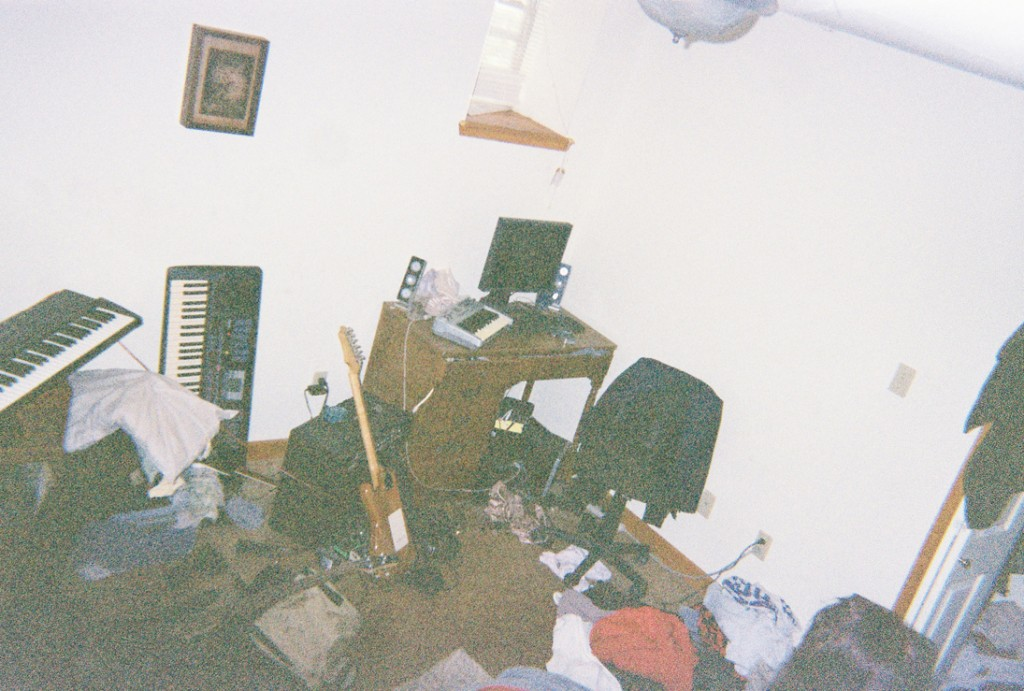
Loca's home studio in 2007

Part Time was named so because it began as a solo side project of Loca's, who had been performing with groups from Texas and Oklahoma. Loca produced and wrote all the output, with the exception of some material enlisting bandmates and friends. He is originally from Florida, later moving to El Paso, Texas, and started his first band at the age 17. The first Part Time recordings were made in the late 1990s and early 2000s, and were first issued on a label in 2011. Albums until Spell #6 (2018) were recorded almost entirely by himself at his home.

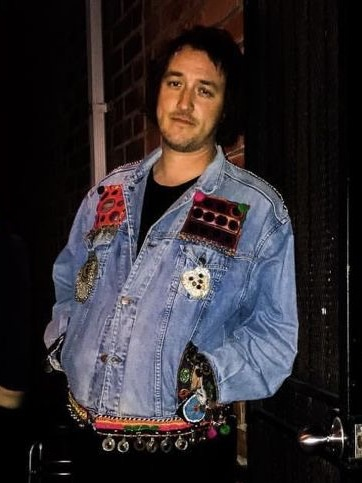
Loca in 2018

== Controversy and disbandment ==
On July 21, 2020, Mexican Summer removed Part Time merchandise from their website and submitted takedown requests for the albums What Would You Say? and PDA on streaming services following the appearance of domestic abuse, sexual misconduct, and sexual abuse allegations against Loca and other artists affiliated with the now-defunct Burger Records label. On July 28, Loca issued a statement that said he would remove the rest of his music from online platforms.

== Members ==
- David Loca
- Wally Byers
- Robert Dozal
- Billy Trujillo
- Tony Leal

== Discography ==
- Part Time (2009)
- What Would You Say? (2011)
- Saturday Night (2012)
- PDA (2013)
- Late Night with David Loca (2014)
- H.F.M. (2014)
- Virgo's Maze (2015)
- David Loca & The Berkshire Hobbits (Together We Are!) (2015)
- Return to Cherry (2015)
- Spell #6 (2018)
- Modern History (2019)
- Special Blue (2023)
- Tales Of The Bubblegum Brainz (2023)
- Cryosleep Explorer (2023)
- Davida’s Neverending Nightmare (2024)
- Cyber Tongue (2026)
- Lucifer Rising (2026)
