= BlackGirl discography =

- Studio albums: 1
- Singles: 7
- Music videos: 5

This is the discography of the American band BlackGirl.

== Albums ==
=== Studio albums ===
| Year | Album | Chart positions | | | Sales |
| Year | Album | US | US R&B | US Top Heatseekers | Album Sales |
|---|---|---|---|---|---|
| 1994 | Treat U Right | - | 47 | 17 | 100,000 |

== Singles ==
Singles

| Year | Single | Peak positions | | | | |
| Year | Single | US Billboard Hot 100 | US Hot R&B/Hip-Hop Singles & Tracks | US Rhythmic Top 40 | UK Top 75 | US Single Sales |
|---|---|---|---|---|---|---|
| 1994 | "Krazy" | 91 | 37 | 40 | - | 34,000 |
| 1994 | "90's Girl" | 71 | 13 | - | 23 | 139,000 |
| 1994 | "Where Did We Go Wrong" | 118 | 39 | - | - | 71,000 |
| 1994 | "Give Love on Christmas Day" | - | - | - | - | 2,000 |
| 1995 | "Let's Do It Again" | 113 | 25 | 39 | - | 100,000 |
| 1995 | "Freedom" | 45 | 18 | - | - | - |
| 1996 | "Hey, Look Away" Questionmark Asylum featuring BlackGirl | - | 56 | - | - | - |
"—" denotes a release that did not chart.
