= RedZone Entertainment =

Music-production entity

- Type: Corporation
- Industry: Music
- Founded: 1995
- Founders: Christopher "Tricky" Stewart; Mark "E" Stewart
- Headquarters: Atlanta, Georgia
- Area served: Worldwide
- Key people: Christopher "Tricky" Stewart; Owner/Founder; Mark E. Stewart; Owner/Founder; Judi Stewart; Artist Management; Terius "The-Dream" Nash; Writer/Producer; Kuk Harrell; Writer/Producer
- Services: Music Production; Music Composition; Artist Management
- Number of employees: 9 (2008)
- Website: RedZoneEntertainment.com

RedZone Entertainment is an Atlanta-based, music-production entity. Redzone's discography includes collaborations with many artists, producers, and composers of note, and is responsible for over 25 million records sold. RedZone Entertainment has produced acts such as P!nk, Britney Spears, Celine Dion, Mary J. Blige, Usher, Ciara, Sting, Rihanna, and Justin Bieber.

Founded in 1995 by music producer Christopher "Tricky" Stewart and artist manager Mark E. Stewart, RedZone Entertainment serves as both the parent company and production arm of the Stewart brothers' music business. This includes two publishing companies, an Atlanta recording studio, and an artist management company.

== Origins and history ==
=== Family beginnings ===
The Stewart brothers grew up in a family heavily involved in the business of making music. Their mother and her two sisters were background singers for such artists as Aretha Franklin and Curtis Mayfield, and the trio were also jingle singers featured on many national ad campaigns. Their father and his brother operated a jingle company in Chicago whose clients included Ford Motor Company, McDonald's, Coca-Cola, Bud Light, and many others.

In 1989, Big brother Laney Stewart opened his own jingle company, Minute Men Music. This was the company that gave Mark, Tricky and Judi (Tricky's sister-in-law) their start as professionals in the music business, Tricky in the area of recording and music production, Mark and Judi in the area of business. In 1989 when Laney Stewart signed an exclusive publishing agreement with Famous Music, and the family left jingles and began writing and producing records full-time for major artists.

=== Record production ===
In 1990, at the age of 16, Tricky got his first major label placement when he produced a song entitled "Hold Me Tight" for MCA recording artist, Troy Hinton. In the next two years Tricky went on to produce records for Aaron Hall, Damion Hall, Immature and others.

=== Company moves ===
In the fall of 1992 Mark and Tricky moved the RedZone base of operations from Chicago to Los Angeles.

In 1994, the Stewarts met record producer and songwriter L.A. Reid of LaFace records. Reid offered them a deal to move their production company to Atlanta, and the brothers accepted.

=== RedZone established in Atlanta ===
In 1995, with the support of Reid, his brother Mark Stewart, and his sister-in-law Judi Stewart, Tricky established RedZone Entertainment and Triangle Sound studios in West Buckhead, Atlanta, GA.

== Early years 1998–2003 ==
=== Early years ===
1998 was a pivotal year for RedZone Entertainment. Christopher "Tricky" Stewart wrote and produced JT Money's single "Who Dat", which featured rapper Solé. "Who Dat" reached #1 on the Billboard Rap chart and #5 on Billboards "Hot 100" in 1999. In 2000 Stewart and his writers penned Mýa's "Case of the Ex". The single debuted at #12 on the Hot Singles Sales and peaked at #2 on the Billboard Hot 100. It remains Mýa's highest-charting solo single on the Hot 100 to date.

Solé went on to sign with RedZone, who produced her album "Skin Deep" released in September 1999. "Skin Deep" peaked at #127 on the Billboard 200, and #27 on the top hip-hop albums chart. The single off the album "4,5,6" was Ascap's "Female Rap Song of the Year." 1998 was also the year RedZone discovered producer Kevin "She'kspere" Briggs, who produced TLC's "No Scrubs" and Destiny's Child's "Bills, Bills, Bills". During this time, Redzone signed Music Producer Chuckey Charles, R&B singer Sam Salter, and R&B singer/songwriter Blu Cantrell.

=== Blu Cantrell ===
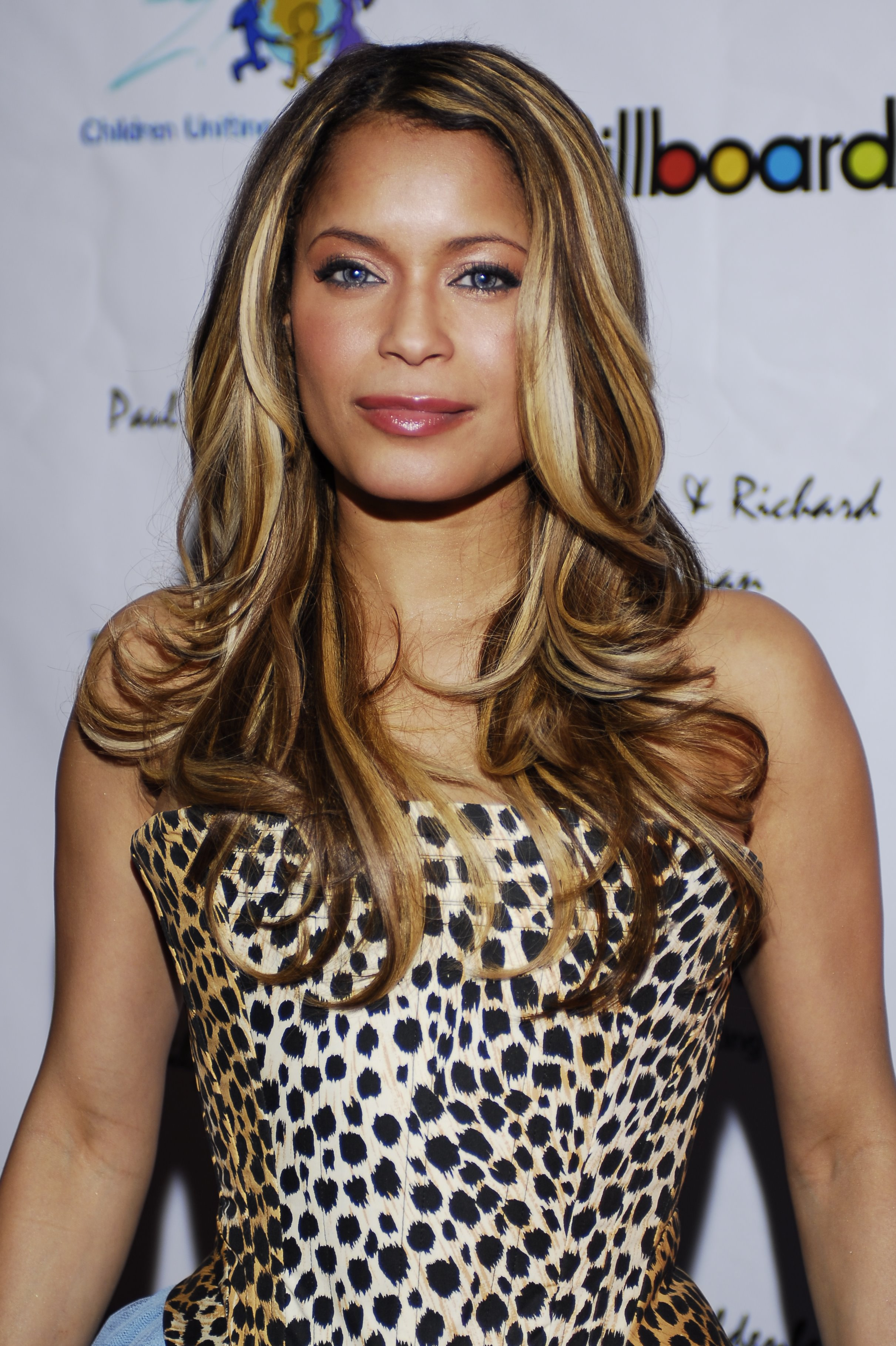
Blu Cantrell

In 2000, Tricky Stewart and producer/writer Tab started working with Blu Cantrell on a demo recording and helped her break into the business singing back up for such artists as Diddy, Gerald Levert, Aaron Hall, and Faith Evans. Once the demo was complete L.A. Reid was invited to hear Cantrell, and he signed her immiediately to Arista Records. Reid was quoted as saying:

"Her voice seemed to satisfy that yearning in my soul, not only for a great singer, but for a sound that I felt was missing in today's music."

Cantrell's debut album, So Blu, was released on July 31, 2001, debuting at number eight on the Billboard 200. In 2001, Cantrell received nominations for Best New Artist from both the Grammy Awards and the American Music Awards as well as a Grammy nomination for Best R&B Vocal Performance for the song "Hit 'Em Up Style (Oops!)". The song was written and produced by Dallas Austin, and spent weeks on the Billboard Hot 100. In 2002, Cantrell was nominated for a Grammy Award and an American Music Award. She collaborated with RedZone on her follow-up album Bittersweet.

=== A creative community ===
In 2003, RedZone expanded from just a producer driven company to a creative community, fostering and collaborating with many writers and producers. The list over the years includes, but is not limited too, The-Dream, P. Magnet, Traci Hale, Tab, B. Cox, Kuk Harrell, Jazze Pha, Dallas Austin, Battery Five, Jermaine Dupri, Dean, J "Q" of The Clutch, Dru Castro, Todd Herfindel, J.B. of "the Movement", Zeke and Ciara. RedZone has served as the springboard for many influential writers, artists, producers, and music industry professionals.

=== Britney Spears ===
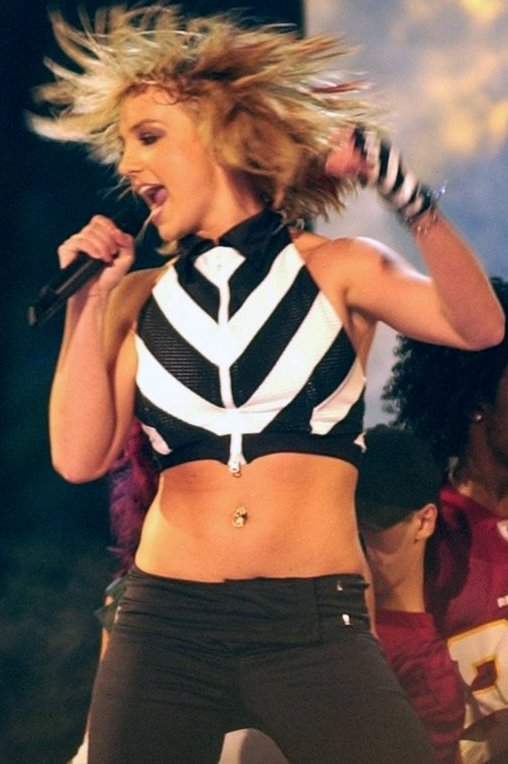
Britney Spears

In 2003 RedZone produced Britney Spears' "Me Against the Music" which featured Madonna. The song went on to become the first single off her record "In The Zone" and won the Billboard Music Award for Best-Selling Dance Single of the Year. This led to the enlistment of RedZone founder Tricky Stewart and one of his production partners P. Magnet to work on several more songs for the album. They wrote the lyrics for the Moby produced "Early Morning", recorded vocals for the R. Kelly-produced "Outrageous" and wrote and produced "The Hook Up", which had a reggae feel.

Tricky described the Britney Spears project as "the tip of the iceberg" of RedZone's new style.

"It's just a natural growth of what's going on in music," Tricky explained. "It's half rapping, half singing. It's young, it's beat driven, it's everything the kids are going to be looking for. It's a hip-hop dance genre. We don't have a name for it yet, but we're going to name it. We are not going to join the radio right now, we're going to fix it. We're going to change the way radio sounds."

== 2004–present ==
=== Kuk Harrell, vocal producer, songwriter, and engineer ===
In 2004 vocal producer, songwriter and engineer Kuk Harrell joined and became a key player on the RedZone team. He would go on to co-write RedZone's production Rihanna's "Umbrella", as well as produce the vocal.

=== Rihanna – "Umbrella" ===
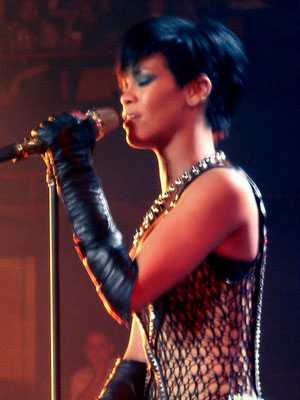
Rihanna performing in 2008

Released in March 2007, the RedZone production "Umbrella", performed by Barbadian singer Rihanna on the Def Jam Recordings album Good Girl Gone Bad, yielded the company's furthest commercial success. The song, co-written by Terius "The-Dream" Nash, Kuk Harrell, and Tricky Stewart, was produced by Stewart, with vocal production provided by Harrell. It featured an introductory verse by rapper Jay-Z, and peaked atop the Billboard Hot 100 for seven weeks. The video for the song earned five nominations for MTV's 2007 Video Music Awards, and won for Smash Single Of The Year. "Umbrella" also won a Grammy Award from three nominations, and was met with generally positive reception from music critics.

Entertainment Weekly magazine placed "Umbrella" at the top of their list of the Ten Best Singles of 2007, and Rolling Stone magazine declared it number three of the 100 Best Songs of the year; it was also named Song of the Year in Blender magazine's Readers' Poll 2007. In 2008, "Umbrella" won a Grammy Award for Best Rap/Sung Collaboration in addition to receiving nominations for Record of the Year and Song of the Year.

The RedZone staff suddenly found themselves in demand. Stewart, Nash, and Harrell closed out the year working with artists including Janet Jackson ("Greatest X" off Discipline), Jesse McCartney ("Leavin'" off the record Departure), Celine Dion ("Skies of L.A." off her album Taking Chances), and Usher ("Moving Mountains" and "This Ain't Sex" of his album Here I Stand).

=== J. Holiday "Bed" ===
2007 saw another successful release for RedZone with the single "Bed". The song was released June 19, 2007, it written by Terius Nash ("The-Dream) and sung/performed by J. Holiday on his debut album "Back of My Lac'". "Bed" debuted on the U.S. Billboard Hot 100 in the issue week of July 4, 2007 at number 89 and peaked at number 5. It was number 1 on the Hot R&B/Hip-Hop Songs for five weeks in a row. On Tuesday July 31, 2007 the song/single debuted on BET's 106 & Park countdown at number 9. On Wednesday, August 15, 2007,--its 11th day on the countdown-- "Bed" hit number one! The song was #70 on Rolling Stone's list of the 100 Best Songs of 2007. The video for "Bed" was ranked the #11 video of 2007 on BET's notorized.

Tricky Stewart co-wrote and produced the follow-up single "Suffocate", released on October 2, 2007. The song peaked at #2 on Billboards "Hot R&B/Hip Hop Songs", #5 on U.S. Billboards Rhythmic Top 40, and #55 on the U.S. Billboard Pop 100. J. Holiday was subsequently nominated for BET's "Best Male R&B Singer 2008".

=== Chris Brown, "Exclusive" ===
The RedZone team contributed to two songs off Chris Brown's album "Exclusive" which was released on Oct 30, 2007. Terius "The-Dream" Nash wrote on "You" and "Gimme Watcha Got" featuring Lil' Wayne.

=== The Dream-"Love Hate" ===
After the success of "Umbrella", and J. Holiday's "Bed", RedZone writer/producer "The-Dream" went on to artistic success with his own certified gold record "Love Hate". The album, executive produced by Tricky Stewart, was released on December 11, 2007 on the Def Jam label. "Love Hate" spawned three singles, "Shawty Is a 10", "Falsetto", and "I Luv Your Girl". The singles peaked on the Billboard hot R&B/Hip Hop song charts at #6, #3, and #3 respectively. "The-Dream" is currently featured on Plies single "Please Excuse My Hands", which also features Jamie Foxx, as well as L.L. Cool J's "Baby", and Gym Class Heroes "Cookie Jar".

=== Mary J. Blige, "Growing Pains" ===
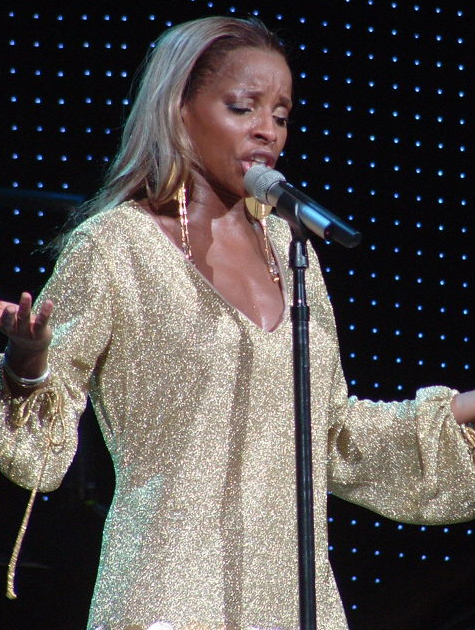
Mary J. Blige.

The RedZone team was nominated in 2007 for a Grammy for "Best Female R&B Vocal Performance" on Mary J. Blige's "Just Fine". "Just Fine", released October 16, 2007, was the leading single off Mary J.'s most recent album "Growing Pains", and was written by Tricky Stewart and Terius "The-Dream" Nash. It was produced by Tricky Stewart, and Kuk Harrell produced the vocals. Stewart also co-wrote and produced many of the tracks on the album "Growing Pains", Terius "The-Dream" Nash wrote on 6 of the album's tracks, and the vocals on all of the tracks but one were produced by Kuk Harrell.

The album, released on Dec 17, 2007, debuted at number two on the U.S. Billboard 200 chart and number one on the R&B chart. In its second week the album climbed to number one on the Billboard 200 with 204,000 copies sold. In the UK, the album entered the charts at Number 6, making it her highest charting album there since "No More Drama" in 2001 with first week sales of 21,755.

=== Mariah Carey, "Touch My Body" ===
Released February 4, 2008, "Touch My Body" is a song co-written by American singer Mariah Carey, Christopher "Tricky" Stewart, Crystal "Cri$tyle" Johnson and Terius "The-Dream" Nash for Carey's eleventh studio album, E=MC². Produced by Carey, Stewart and Nash, it was released as the lead single off the album. The song is Carey's eighteenth number one single on the Billboard Hot 100 and nominated for a 2008 MTV Video Music Awards.

A review in Billboard Magazine stated that "this sensual jam is 100% Mariah, packed with satisfying harmonic layers and hooky background 'oh's,' supersonic verses and a chorus as catchy as a winter sniffle", and Blender stated that it was a "pop genius making genius pop". Bill Lamb from About.com also gave "Touch My Body" a positive review, giving it 4 out of 5 stars, stating that the single "is simple, sexy elegance from one of the most enduring of pop stars". Newsday also named it as the "Song of the Week", commenting that it was "the best opening single she's had since "Heartbreaker". Digital Spy was also positive, saying "its cooing, sensual charms soon take hold, suggesting the wind's still very much behind the Carey comeback bandwagon".

=== Jesse McCartney, "Leavin'" ===
On March 10, 2008, Tricky Stewart, Terius "The-Dream" Nash, and Kuk Harrell co-created the single entitled "Leavin'" for Jesse McCartney's album "Departure" which was subsequently released on May 20, 2008. "Leavin'" peaked at #10 on the Billboard Hot 100 chart, #2 on the Billboard Pop 100 chart, #1 on Billboard Hot Dance Club Play, and #1 on Billboard Mainstream Top 40 singles chart.

Leavin' stayed in the top 20 on the Billboard Hot 100 for 20 weeks.

=== Justin Bieber, "One Time" and "Baby" ===
Tricky Stewart, Terius "The-Dream" Nash, and Kuk Harrell wrote and produced the hit single "One Time" for Canadian singer Justin Bieber's debut album, My World. The single was released on July 7, 2009. It peaked at #12 in Canada, and #17 in the U.S. and also did well internationally. They also produced "Baby for his My World (Part II) which charted at #3 in Canada and #5 in the U.S.

=== Ciara, "Fantasy Ride" (2009) and "Basic Instinct" (2010) ===
In early 2009, Tricky Stewart and Terius "The-Dream" Nash wrote and produced numerous songs on Ciara's third studio album, "Fantasy Ride", which was released on May 5, 2009. They both co-wrote and produced five songs titled "High Price", "Like a Surgeon", "Ciara to the Stage", "Lover's Thing", and "Keep Dancin' On Me" on the album.

In 2010, Tricky Stewart and The-Dream went in the studio at work on Ciara's fourth studio album titled "'Basic Instinct'", which is set for a release on December 14, 2010. The two executive-produced the entire album. The lead single from the album titled "Ride, was produced by the duo, the single was released on April 26, 2010. The single went on to become her twelfth top ten hit on the Billboard Hot R&B/Hip-Hop Songs chart. Tricky, The-Dream and Ciara are currently putting the finishing touches on the highly anticipated album.

=== Xscape ===
In December 2017; Laney Stewart produced 90's girl group Xscape (LaTocha Scott, Tameka "Tiny" Cottle-Harris, & Tamika Scott) as a trio minus Kandi Burress (Xscap3) to release the song "Dream Killa" with a follow-up by Pierre Medor titled "Here For It", with the EP executive produced by Tricky Stewart.

== See also ==
- Tricky Stewart
- Kuk Harrell
- Terius "The-Dream" Nash
