= Tricky Stewart =

American record producer (born 1974)

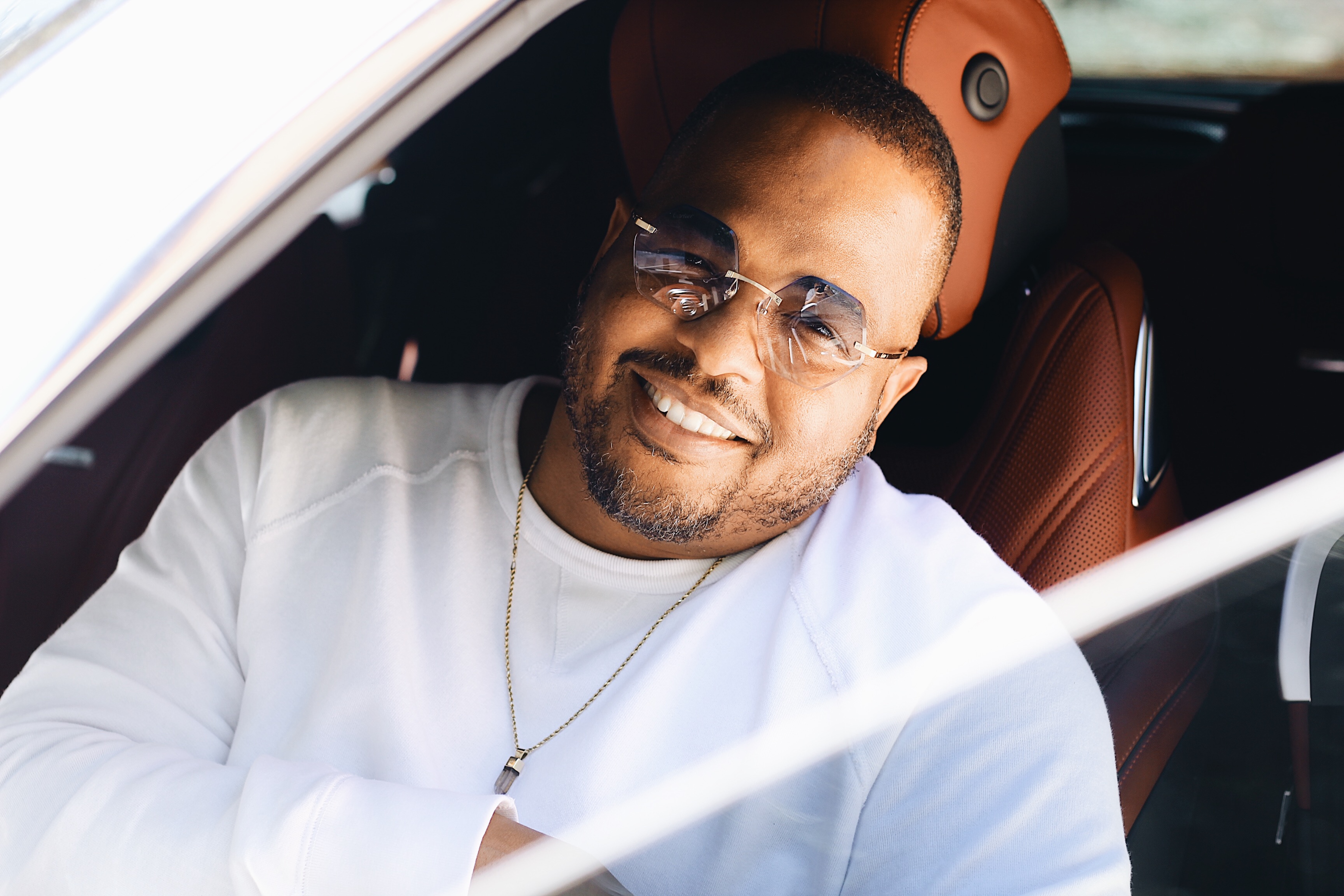
- Stewart in 2020

Background information
- Also known as: Tricky; Trixter
- Born: Christopher Alan Stewart; January 4, 1974 (age 52); Markham, Illinois, U.S.
- Genres: R&B; hip hop
- Occupations: Record producer; record executive; music publisher; songwriter; entrepreneur
- Years active: 1992–present
- Labels: Spirit Music; Epic; Island; Def Jam; RedZone; MCA

Christopher Alan "Tricky" Stewart (born January 4, 1974) is an American record producer, record executive, songwriter, and music publisher. Stewart, a five-time Grammy Award recipient, began producing music in 1992 and has contributed to unit sales of over 50 million for his work on hip hop, R&B and pop releases. Often in tandem with production partner and R&B singer The-Dream, he has been credited on the singles "Case of the Ex" (2000) by Mýa, "Me Against the Music" (2003) by Britney Spears, "Umbrella" (2007) by Rihanna, "Just Fine" (2007) by Mary J. Blige, "Single Ladies (Put a Ring on It)" (2008) by Beyoncé, "Touch My Body" (2008) and "Obsessed" (2009) by Mariah Carey, "One Time" (2009) and "Baby" (2010) by Justin Bieber, "Ride" (2010) by Ciara, and "Water" (2023) by Tyla, among others.

Stewart co-founded the record company RedZone Entertainment in 1995, which signed R&B singer Frank Ocean prior to his mainstream breakthrough. In 2012, he was included in Billboard's 40 Under 40, a list of music executives "who are propelling our industry with their artistic and business vision." Stewart signed a publishing contract with Spirit Music Group in 2020, a deal which covered his following works as he sold his catalog to Hipgnosis Songs two years prior.

== Early life ==
Stewart was born in Markham, Illinois. Raised in a musical family, he was playing guitar, keyboards, and writing songs by the age of 12. His older brother, record producer Laney Stewart, introduced him to one of his first music business mentors, the late Louis Silas, Jr., who fostered Stewart's musical career by giving him the opportunity to contribute to several projects for major artists. Before graduating high school, Stewart had placements with artists such as Aaron Hall, rhythm and blues trio IMx, and Chanté Moore. He credits working with the latter gave him further opportunities in his burgeoning career.

== Career ==
=== 1994–2005 ===
In 1994, Stewart produced the single "Treat U Right" for Blackgirl. He also met record producer L.A. Reid, who offered him a deal to move his first production company to Atlanta. In 1995, with the support of Reid, he launched the company RedZone Entertainment and recording studio, Triangle Sound. Both were operated in partnership with his brother Mark Stewart and sister-in-law Judi Stewart. RedZone Entertainment is based in Atlanta, but also has a recording studio in Los Angeles.

Stewart saw his first major breakthrough in 1999 when he co-produced the single "Who Dat" for JT Money. The song peaked at number five on the Billboard Hot 100, received platinum certification by the Recording Industry Association of America and won ASCAP's "Song of the Year". In addition to producing and writing, Stewart executive produced albums for Solé and Blu Cantrell.

In 2000, Tricky co-wrote and produced Interscope Records artist Mýa's breakthrough single "Case of the Ex". It peaked at number two on the Billboard Hot 100 in December 2000, and remained in the chart's top ten for three months. While Mya's song was still on top, Stewart discovered and signed Blu Cantrell, and went on to executive produce her debut album So Blu on Arista Records. It peaked at number eight on the Billboard 200 and spawned the Billboard Hot 100-top two single "Hit 'em Up Style (Oops!)".

In 2002, Stewart co-produced and co-wrote B2K's debut single, "Uh Huh". In 2003, Blu Cantrell's second album, Bittersweet, was released; it features three songs produced by Stewart, "Unhappy", "Holding on to Love" and "Let Her Go". He also co-wrote and produced a number of songs for Britney Spears's fourth album, In the Zone (2003), including two of its singles, "Me Against the Music" and "Outrageous", as well as "Early Mornin'" and "The Hook Up".

=== 2006–present ===
2007 was a breakthrough year for Stewart and RedZone Entertainment. Rihanna's single "Umbrella", co-written with The-Dream, garnered two Grammy nominations—for Record of the Year and Song of the Year—and won the award for Best Rap/Sung Collaboration. In an interview with MTV, Stewart said

"When she recorded the 'ellas' you knew it was about to be the jump-off, and your life was about to change if you had anything to do with that record."

Released in March 2007, "Umbrella" topped the Billboard Hot 100 chart by May, rising 40 spots in one week to spend seven consecutive weeks at number one. The song also broke the iTunes music store's record for biggest debut. Its success brought Rihanna to a mainstream prominence; co-writer and business partner The-Dream ultimately signed with Def Jam Recordings to release his own singles. Stewart was credited on his follow-up singles "Falsetto" and "I Luv Your Girl". In late 2007, Stewart was working with notable artists as Janet Jackson, Celine Dion, and Usher ("Moving Mountains" and "This Ain't Sex" of his album Here I Stand).

"It's crazy, just being a part of that, I've seen a lot of things in my time in the music business, but to see a record take off like that, it's just amazing."

Stewart was also nominated in 2007 for a Grammy for "Best Female R&B Vocal Performance" on Mary J. Blige's "Just Fine"; that same year, Stewart also co-wrote and produced on the album Growing Pains, as well as the vocals were produced by his production team. Composed of Tricky, The-Dream, and Kuk Harrell, it proved to be a successful tandem. Stewart won his first Grammy Awardfor his work on Growing Pains in 2009.

The single "Touch My Body" off Mariah Carey's album in 2008 E=MC², produced by Stewart and Carey was described as "...a No. 1 just waiting to pounce the Billboard Hot 100" by Chuck Taylor of Billboard Magazine. On April 2, 2008, it was announced that "Touch My Body" became Carey's 18th No. 1 single on the Billboard Hot 100, pushing her to second place among artists with the most No. 1 singles in the rock era and first place as a solo artist in the same category, surpassing Elvis Presley. The achievement was attributed to a record-breaking digital sales debut, as 286,000 copies were sold in its first week of availability.

Also in 2008, he produced the songs, "Single Ladies (Put a Ring on It)" for Beyoncé as well as the ballad "Smash into You". "Single Ladies" would later become a pop culture phenomenon due to its female empowerment lyrics, catchy melody and much parodied music video. The song won multiple Grammy and MTV Video Music Awards, and remains Stewart's best-selling single.

For Ciara's 2009 album, Fantasy Ride, he produced the song "High Price", which features Ludacris. That same year, he also worked with Japanese-American singer-songwriter Utada on her third English studio album This Is The One, on which he produced four songs.

Tricky and The-Dream collaborated with Mariah Carey on her 2009 album, Memoirs of an Imperfect Angel, for which they co-produced each song, and co-wrote all but one of the songs.

Tricky and The-Dream executive-produced Ciara's fourth studio album, Basic Instinct, which was released on December 10, 2010. The lead single from the album, "Ride" was produced by the duo and released in April 2010; it went on to become Ciara's 12th top ten hit on the Billboard R&B/Hip-Hop Songs chart.

Stewart contributed to the Christina Aguilera album Bionic, released in June 2010, and produced the score for her debut film, Burlesque, released in November 2010.

Stewart produced Katy Perry's second studio album, Teenage Dream which was released in 2010. Its second promotional single, "Circle the Drain", was produced by Stewart and released on iTunes in August of that year.

Stewart co-produced three songs and one bonus track from Jennifer Lopez's eighth studio album Love?, which was released in April 2011. The album marked her first release through Island Records after completing her 10-year contract with Epic Records in February 2010.

Stewart also contributed to Big Time Rush's song "No Idea" from their sophomore album Elevate, released in November 2011.

In October 2016, he was a producer and songwriter for BTS's song "BTS Cypher 4".

In July of 2023, Stewart wrote Tyla's single "Water".

In November 2023, Stewart co-produced P1Harmony's single "Fall in Love Again".

== Discography ==
=== Produced singles ===
Year	Single	Peak chart positions							Artist	Album
Year	Single	US	US R&B	US Rap	US Pop	UK	CAN	AUS	Artist	Album
1999	"Who Dat" (featuring Solé)	5	2	1	—	—	—	—	JT Money	Pimpin' on Wax
1999	"4, 5, 6" (featuring JT Money and Kandi)	27	9	1	—	—	—	—	Solé	Skin Deep
2000	"It Wasn't Me" (featuring Ginuwine)	—	44	—	—	—	—	—	Solé	Skin Deep
2000	"If You Don't Wanna Love Me"	89	30	—	—	—	—	—	Tamar Braxton	Tamar
2000	"Case of the Ex"	2	10	—	—	3	14	1	Mýa	Fear of Flying
2001	"Uh Huh"	37	20	—	—	31	4	41	B2K	B2K
2003	"Me Against the Music" (featuring Madonna)	35	—	—	—	2	2	1	Britney Spears	In the Zone
2007	"Umbrella" (featuring Jay-Z)	1	4	—	1	1	1	1	Rihanna	Good Girl Gone Bad
2007	"Just Fine"	22	3	—	42	16	84	—	Mary J. Blige	Growing Pains
2007	"Ridin'"	—	58	—	—	—	—	—	Mýa	Liberation
2007	"Suffocate"	18	2	—	55	—	—	—	J. Holiday	Back of My Lac'
2007	"Falsetto"	30	3	—	94	—	—	—	The-Dream	Love/Hate
2007	"I Luv Your Girl" (featuring Young Jeezy)	20	3	—	58	—	—	—	The-Dream	Love/Hate
2008	"Touch My Body"	1	2	—	1	5	2	17	Mariah Carey	E=MC²
2008	"Leavin'"	10	—	—	1	48	16	49	Jesse McCartney	Departure
2008	"Moving Mountains"	67	18	—	—	25	—	36	Usher	Here I Stand
2008	"Cookie Jar" (featuring The-Dream)	59	—	—	55	6	91	41	Gym Class Heroes	The Quilt
2008	"Single Ladies (Put a Ring on It)"	1	1	—	2	7	2	5	Beyoncé	I Am... Sasha Fierce
2008	"Just Like Me" (featuring T.I.)	49	8	—	—	—	—	91	Jamie Foxx	Intuition
2009	"Hands on Me"	—	56	—	—	—	—	—	Bobby Valentino	The Rebirth
2009	"Throw It in the Bag" (featuring The-Dream)	14	4	2	—	—	—	—	Fabolous	Loso's Way
2009	"All I Really Want" (featuring The-Dream)	—	—	—	—	—	—	—	Rick Ross	Deeper Than Rap
2009	"Like a Surgeon"	—	59	—	—	—	—	—	Ciara	Fantasy Ride
2009	"Obsessed"	7	12	—	—	52	15	13	Mariah Carey	Memoirs of an Imperfect Angel
2009	"One Time"	17	—	—	14	11	12	35	Justin Bieber	My World
2009	"I Look to You"	70	16	—	—	115	68	—	Whitney Houston	I Look to You
2009	"Gangsta Luv" (featuring The-Dream)	35	24	5	—	—	—	—	Snoop Dogg	Malice n Wonderland
2009	"Louboutins"	—	—	—	—	—	—	—	Jennifer Lopez	Love?
2009	"Hard" (featuring Young Jeezy)	8	14	—	9	42	15	75	Rihanna	Rated R
2010	"Baby" (featuring Ludacris)	5	96	—	—	3	3	18	Justin Bieber	My World 2.0
2010	"Up Out My Face" (remix) (featuring Nicki Minaj)	100	39	—	—	—	—	—	Mariah Carey	Angels Advocate (Unreleased)
2010	"Ride" (featuring Ludacris)	42	3	—	—	75	—	75	Ciara	Basic Instinct
2010	"Speechless"	—	74	—	—	—	—	—	Ciara	Basic Instinct
2010	"Gimmie Dat"	—	63	—	—	111	—	—	Ciara	Basic Instinct
2011	"Novacane"	82	17	—	—	—	—	—	Frank Ocean	Nostalgia, Ultra

=== Credits ===
Year	Album/song	Artist	Credit
2022	"Break My Soul"	Beyoncé	Producer
2021	Bodies	Muni Long	Producer, Composer
2020	Eden / I Spoiled You	Matt B	Producer
2016	Lilac / "Purple"	ThiDaniel aka Saucito	Producer
2011	No Idea	Big Time Rush	Writer/Producer
2011	Novacane	Frank Ocean	Writer/Producer
2011	Ride Freestyle	Jamie Drastik	Producer
2010	No Mercy / "No Mercy"	T.I.	Producer
2010	Love King / "Panties to the Side"	The-Dream	Producer
2010	Basic Instinct / "Gimmie Dat"	Ciara	Producer
2010	Basic Instinct / "Ride"	Ciara / Ludacris	Producer
2010	Untitled Yet	Celine Dion	Producer
2010	Love? / "Run the World"	Jennifer Lopez	Producer
2010	Burlesque soundtrack / "Express", "Show Me How You Burlesque"	Christina Aguilera/ Cher	
2010	Bionic / "Desnudate", "Glam", "Prima Donna"	Christina Aguilera	Producer, composer
2010	Teenage Dream/ "Circle the Drain", "Who Am I Living For?", "Hummingbird Heartbeat", "Dressin'Up"	Katy Perry	Producer, composer
2009	D.N.A./ Starlight	Mario	Producer
2009	D.N.A./ Don't Walk Away	Mario	Producer
2009	Memoirs of an Imperfect Angel	Mariah Carey	Writer/producer
2009	Fantasy Ride/ High Price	Ciara/ Ludacris	Producer
2009	Fantasy Ride/ Ciara to the Stage	Ciara	Producer
2009	Fantasy Ride/ Like a Surgeon	Ciara	Producer
2009	Fantasy Ride/ Keep Dancin' On Me	Ciara	Producer
2009	This Is The One	Utada	Producer
2009	Loso's Way / Throw It in the Bag	Fabolous / The-Dream	Producer
2009	Hatin on the Club	Rihanna / The-Dream	Producer
2008	Intuition	Jamie Foxx	Producer, composer
2008	Call and Response: The Remix Album/"This Love (C. "Tricky" Stewart Remix)"	Maroon 5	Producer
2008	I Am... Sasha Fierce/"Single Ladies (Put a Ring on It)" and "Smash into You"	Beyoncé	Composer, producer
2008	The Quilt/"Cookie Jar"	Gym Class Heroes	Producer
2008	"Hurt That Body"	Donnie Klang	Composer, producer
2008	Here I Stand/"This Ain't Sex"	Usher	Composer, producer
2008	Here I Stand/"Moving Mountains"	Usher	Composer, producer
2008	E=MC²	Mariah Carey	Composer, producer
2008	E=MC²	Mariah Carey	Composer, producer
2008	E=MC²(deluxe edition)	Mariah Carey	Composer, producer
2008	E=MC²/"Touch My Body"	Mariah Carey	Composer, producer
2008	Departure	Jesse McCartney	Composer, producer
2008	Departure/"Leavin'"	Jesse McCartney	Composer, producer
2008	Discipline	Janet Jackson	Producer
2008	Discipline "Greatest X"	Janet Jackson	Producer, composer
2008	Discipline (CD/DVD Japan deluxe edition)	Janet Jackson	Producer
2008	Discipline (CD/DVD)	Janet Jackson	Producer
2007	Back of My Lac' (CD/DVD)	J. Holiday	Producer, composer
2007	Love/Hate	The-Dream	Composer, producer, director
2007	Love/Hate (clean)	The-Dream	Composer, producer, director
2007	Love/Hate/"Falsetto"	The-Dream	Composer, producer
2007	Love/Hate/"I Luv Your Girl"	The-Dream	Composer, producer
2007	Good Girl Gone Bad	Rihanna	Composer, producer, keyboards, drum programming
2007	Good Girl Gone Bad (bonus CD)	Rihanna	Composer, producer, keyboards, drum programming
2007	Good Girl Gone Bad/"Umbrella"	Rihanna	Composer, producer
2007	Ananda (CD/DVD)	Paulina Rubio	Producer
2007	Ananda (standard)	Paulina Rubio	Producer
2007	Growing Pains	Mary J. Blige	Composer, producer, keyboards, drum programming, mix supervision
2007	Growing Pains/"Just Fine"	Mary J. Blige	Composer, producer
2007	Back of My Lac' (CD/DVD Clean)	J. Holiday	Producer
2007	Back of My Lac' (clean)	J. Holiday	Producer
2007	Back of My Lac'/"Bed"	J. Holiday	Composer, producer
2007	Back of My Lac'/"Suffocate"	J. Holiday	Composer, producer
2007	Taking Chances/"Skies of L.A."	Celine Dion	Producer, keyboards, drum programming
2007	Taking Chances (CD/DVD)	Celine Dion	Producer, keyboards, drum programming
2006	Alter Ego/"Light's On"	Tyrese	Producer
2006	The Best of Sisqo 20th Century Masters Millennium Collection	Sisqó	Producer
2006	Ananda (Target bonus track)	Paulina Rubio	Producer
2006	Ananda (Walmart bonus track)	Paulina Rubio	Producer
2006	Point of No Return / "You Ain't Ready"	3LW	Writer, producer
2006	Point of No Return / "How U Gonna Act"	3LW / Penelope Magnet	Writer, producer
2006	Director	Avant	Producer
2006	Director(Circuit City Exclusive)	Avant	Producer
2005	Back for More	Shawn Desman	Arranger, programming, instrumentation
2005	Back for More (bonus CD)	Shawn Desman	Arranger, programming, instrumentation
2005	Girlfight (Australia)	Brooke Valentine	Producer
2005	In The Zone (DualDisc)	Britney Spears	Programming, instrumentation
2005	Queen of Hip-Pop/"I Love You"	Namie Amuro	Composer, producer, multi-instrumentation
2004	Been Around The World, Pt. 1	Zena	Producer
2004	This Is My Time (Life Is Beautiful / What's Real?)	Raven-Symoné	Producer
2004	Greatest Hits: My Prerogative	Britney Spears	Arranger, programming, multi-instrumentation
2004	Greatest Hits: My Prerogative (import bonus CD)	Britney Spears	Arranger, programming, multi-instrumentation
2004	Greatest Hits: My Prerogative (U.S. bonus CD)	Britney Spears	Arranger, programming, multi-instrumentation
2004	In The Zone (DVD audio/bonus videos)	Britney Spears	Arranger, programming, vocals (background), instrumentation
2004	In The Zone (import bonus track)	Britney Spears	Arranger, programming, vocals (background), instrumentation
2004	Bittersweet (Australia bonus tracks)	Blu Cantrell	Producer, executive producer, drum programming
2004	B2K Greatest Hits	B2K	Producer, composer
2004	Chapter III	Allure	Producer, programming, instrumentation
2003	Moodring	Mýa	Producer
2003	Moodring (UK bonus tracks)	Mýa	Producer
2003	Moodring/"Sophisticated Lady" & "No Sleep Tonight"	Mýa	Producer
2003	In the Zone	Britney Spears	Arranger, programming, vocals (background), multi-instruments
2003	In the Zone (Australia Bonus Tracks)	Britney Spears	Producer, arranger, programming, vocals (background), multi-instruments
2003	Me Against the Music	Britney Spears	Composer, producer, arranger, programming, instrumentation
2003	Me Against the Music (remixes)	Britney Spears	Composer, arranger, programming, instrumentation
2003	Me Against the Music (Australia CD)	Britney Spears	Composer, arranger, programming, instrumentation
2003	Me Against the Music, Pt. 2	Britney Spears	Composer, producer, arranger, programming, instrumentation
2003	Bittersweet (w/Explicit Bonus CD)	Blu Cantrell	Executive producer, drum programming, mixing, instrumentation
2003	Bittersweet/Breathe (CD5)	Blu Cantrell	Executive producer
2002	Funky Divas: The Autumn Collection	Various artists	Producer
2002	The New Guy (soundtrack)	Various artists	Producer
2002	Pure R&B, Vol 3	Various artists	Producer
2002	Bad Company (original soundtrack)	Various artists	Producer
2002	B2K	B2K	Producer
2001	Down To Earth, Music From the Motion Picture	Various artists	Producer, programmer, sequencing
2001	Prophet Jones	Prophet Jones	Producer, programming, keyboards
2001	Fear of Flying	Mýa	Producer, programming, keyboards
2001	Fear of Flying (bonus tracks)	Mýa	Producer, programming, keyboards
2001	Fear of Flying/"Case of the Ex"	Mýa	Producer
2001	Bridging the Gap	Charlie Wilson	Producer, keyboards
2001	So Blu	Blu Cantrell	Executive producer, producer
2000	Take Back (C."Tricky" Stewart remix)	Koda Kumi	Remixer
2000	Tamar	Tamar Braxton	Executive producer, producer, writer
1999	Skin Deep	Solé	Producer, executive producer
1999	Skin Deep (clean)	Solé	Producer, executive producer
1999	Rise to Power	Kane & Abel	Programming, multi-instruments, sequencing
1999	Pimpin' On Wax	J.T. Money	Producer, engineer, programming, vocals, performer
1999	Pimpin' On Wax/"Who dat" feat. Solé	J.T. Money	Producer, composer
1999	Daydreamin'	Before Dark	Sequencing, keyboards
1998	Player's Club (soundtrack)	Various artists	Producer
1998	Player's Club (soundtrack, Clean)	Various artists	Producer
1998	Tyrese	Tyrese	Producer, engineer
1998	Tyrese (clean)	Tyrese	Programming, sequencing
1996	Mista	Mista	Producer
1996	Now and Forever	Color Me Badd	Keyboards
1994	Straight to the Point	Damion Hall	Producer, vocal arrangement, programming, sequencing
1994	Treat U Right	Blackgirl	Producer, vocal arrangement, arranger, sequencing
1993	NBA Jam Session	Various artists	Programming, remixing, sequencing
1993	Remixes in the Key of B	Bobby Brown	Multi-instruments, remixing
1993	The Truth	Aaron Hall	Sequencing
1992	On Our Worst Behavior	Immature	Drums

== Awards and nominations ==
Year	Nominated work	Award	Category	Result
2007	"Umbrella" (Rihanna feat. Jay-Z)	ASCAP Rhythm and Soul Award	Top R&B/Hip Hop Songs of 2007	Won
2007	"Umbrella" (Rihanna feat. Jay-Z)	NMPA	Double Platinum	Won
2007	"Umbrella" (Rihanna feat. Jay-Z)	Grammy Awards	Record of the Year	Nominated
2007	"Umbrella" (Rihanna feat. Jay-Z)	Grammy Awards	Song of the Year	Nominated
2007	"Umbrella" (Rihanna feat. Jay-Z)	ASCAP Pop Award	One of the Most Played Songs of 2007	Won
2010	I Am... Sasha Fierce (Beyoncé)	Grammy Awards	Album of the Year	Nominated
2010	"Single Ladies (Put a Ring on It)" (Beyoncé)	Grammy Awards	Song of the Year	Won
2010	"Single Ladies (Put a Ring on It)" (Beyoncé)	Grammy Awards	Best R&B Song	Won
2011	Teenage Dream (Katy Perry)	Grammy Awards	Album of the Year	Nominated
2012	Loud (Rihanna)	Grammy Awards	Album of the Year	Nominated
2023	Renaissance (Beyoncé)	Grammy Awards	Album of the Year	Nominated
2023	"Break My Soul" (Beyoncé)	Grammy Awards	Record of the Year	Nominated
2023	"Break My Soul" (Beyoncé)	Grammy Awards	Song of the Year	Nominated
2023	"Break My Soul" (Beyoncé)	Grammy Awards	Best Dance/Electronic Recording	Won
