= In the Zone =

2003 studio album by Britney Spears

Studio album by Britney Spears
- Released: November 15, 2003
- Recorded: November 2002 – August 2003
- Studios: 3:20 (Los Angeles); Battery (New York City); Conway (Los Angeles); Daddy's House (New York City); Decoy (Los Angeles); Metrophonic (London); Murlyn (Stockholm); Olympic (London); Pacifique (Los Angeles); The Chocolate Factory (Chicago); The Dojo (New York City); Triangle Sound (Atlanta); Record Plant (Los Angeles); Westlake (Los Angeles)
- Genres: Pop; dance; hip-hop
- Length: 49:55
- Label: Jive
- Producers: Bloodshy & Avant; Brian and Josh; Roy "Royalty" Hamilton; Moby; The Matrix; R. Kelly; Guy Sigsworth; Shep Soloman; Mark Taylor; Trixster

Britney Spears chronology
Britney (2001)	In the Zone (2003)	Greatest Hits: My Prerogative (2004)

Singles from In the Zone
- 1. "Me Against the Music" Released: October 14, 2003; 2. "Toxic" Released: January 12, 2004; 3. "Everytime" Released: May 10, 2004; 4. "Outrageous" Released: July 13, 2004

In the Zone is the fourth studio album by American singer Britney Spears. It was released on November 15, 2003, by Jive Records. Spears began writing songs during her Dream Within a Dream Tour, not knowing the direction of the record. She stated she was an autobiographical songwriter, although not to the point where she felt self-exploited. During the process, she ended her highly-publicized relationship with singer Justin Timberlake. With the tour's conclusion in July 2002, Spears planned to take a six-month break from her career. However, recording for the album commenced in November.

For In the Zone, Spears experimented with different producers, trying to find those with whom she had chemistry. She collaborated with artists such as Madonna and the Ying Yang Twins, while contributions came from a wide range of producers, including Bloodshy & Avant, R. Kelly, Trixster, Moby, Guy Sigsworth and the Matrix. Their final result was an eclectic record incorporating pop and urban music styles with instrumentation from techno and Middle Eastern genres. Its lyrical themes range from romance and partying to more explicit ones such as sex and masturbation. Spears explained that the album's sexual nature was subconscious and emerged while she was in the process of developing the album.

In the Zone received positive reviews upon its release, with music critics widely praising its innovative production, aesthetics, lyricism and blend of eclectic genres, though some criticized Spears' vocals on certain tracks for being distant and processed. A global commercial success, it charted at number one within Argentina, France, Greece, Mexico, South Korea, and the United States and within the top five in Belgium, Canada, Germany, Ireland, Japan, and Singapore. Retrospectively, the album is widely considered a major turning point in Spears' artistic journey and a culmination in her transition from a teen pop star to a more adult artist. Various critics have considered it the album that pushed Spears past her contemporaries, establishing her as a definitive female artist of the 2000s.

In the Zone was promoted with four singles. "Me Against the Music", featuring Madonna, reached the top ten in various countries. "Toxic" peaked atop the charts in eight countries and won Spears her only Grammy Award. "Everytime" peaked within the top ten in many nations. "Outrageous" was plagued by a lack of promotion due to Spears injuring her knee while filming its accompanying music video, and only peaked at number 79 on the US Billboard Hot 100. To further promote the album, Spears embarked on the Onyx Hotel Tour (2004).

== Background and development ==
In October 2001, Spears released her third studio album Britney, which portrayed more mature themes. The following year, her three-year relationship with singer Justin Timberlake ended after months of speculation. After the Dream Within a Dream Tour in support of Britney ended in July 2002, Spears announced a six-month break. In November, she revealed that she had started working on her next studio album. She explained: "Well, actually, I just said that I wanted two or three weeks off. [....] And the whole world was like, 'Ohmigod, [sic] she's gone..."

While in Europe, Spears met with William Orbit and Daft Punk about possible collaborations, and originally confirmed previous collaborators Darkchild and the Neptunes as producers. When asked by The Hollywood Reporter about the direction of the record, Spears responded it was an organic evolution, adding: "It should just happen naturally from the way you feel. [...] Whatever happens, happens". Additionally, Spears scheduled meet-and-greets with Timbaland and Missy Elliott in an effort to help evolve her sound. Elliott was enlisted in further production work with Nisan Stewart for Spears' project; however, none of the initial material was released. Spears also worked with James Murphy of LCD Soundsystem, but their work was unproductive; Murphy said: "We were both lying on the floor, head-to head, working on lyrics in a notepad. She seemed eager to please, but it went nowhere. She went to dinner and just never came back." Limp Bizkit frontman Fred Durst wrote and produced three trip hop tracks recorded by Spears in January 2003. However, after news of an affair between them broke, Durst told Jive Records he would not let them use the songs. In March 2003, Lauren Christy from the Matrix spoke about the development of the album with MTV News, and likened their work with Spears to Madonna's album Ray of Light (1998). Scott Spock, also from the Matrix, continued comparing her to Madonna by saying:

She's taking it to the next level in her career. Madonna constantly takes what's in the club and puts what she does on top of it and makes it mainstream. I think Britney is starting to embrace that concept where she's looking to work on different stuff, instead of using the same familiar, and applying it to her. [...] I don't think [her fans] will be freaked out or upset. I think they'll be really into what's going to happen.

Spears previewed several songs to Quddus Philippe of MTV in May 2003, including "Touch of My Hand", "Brave New Girl" and "Everytime". Spears commented: "I've really been able to take my time and have creative control and make [the new album] special, special, special." On August 27, Spears opened the 2003 MTV Video Music Awards by performing a medley of "Like a Virgin" and "Hollywood" with Madonna, Christina Aguilera and Missy Elliott. The performance started with Spears appearing on stage on top of a giant wedding cake while wearing a wedding gown and veil; she sang the first few lines of "Like a Virgin" before Aguilera appeared from behind the cake and joined her. Madonna then emerged from the cake wearing a black coat and a hat and started singing "Hollywood" before proceeding to kiss Spears and Aguilera on the lips. Elliott came out from a wedding chapel to sing her song "Work It" halfway through the performance. The kiss generated strong reaction from the media. The performance was listed by Blender magazine as one of the 25 sexiest music moments in television history. In 2008, MTV listed the performance as the number-one opening moment in the history of the MTV Video Music Awards.

== Recording and production ==
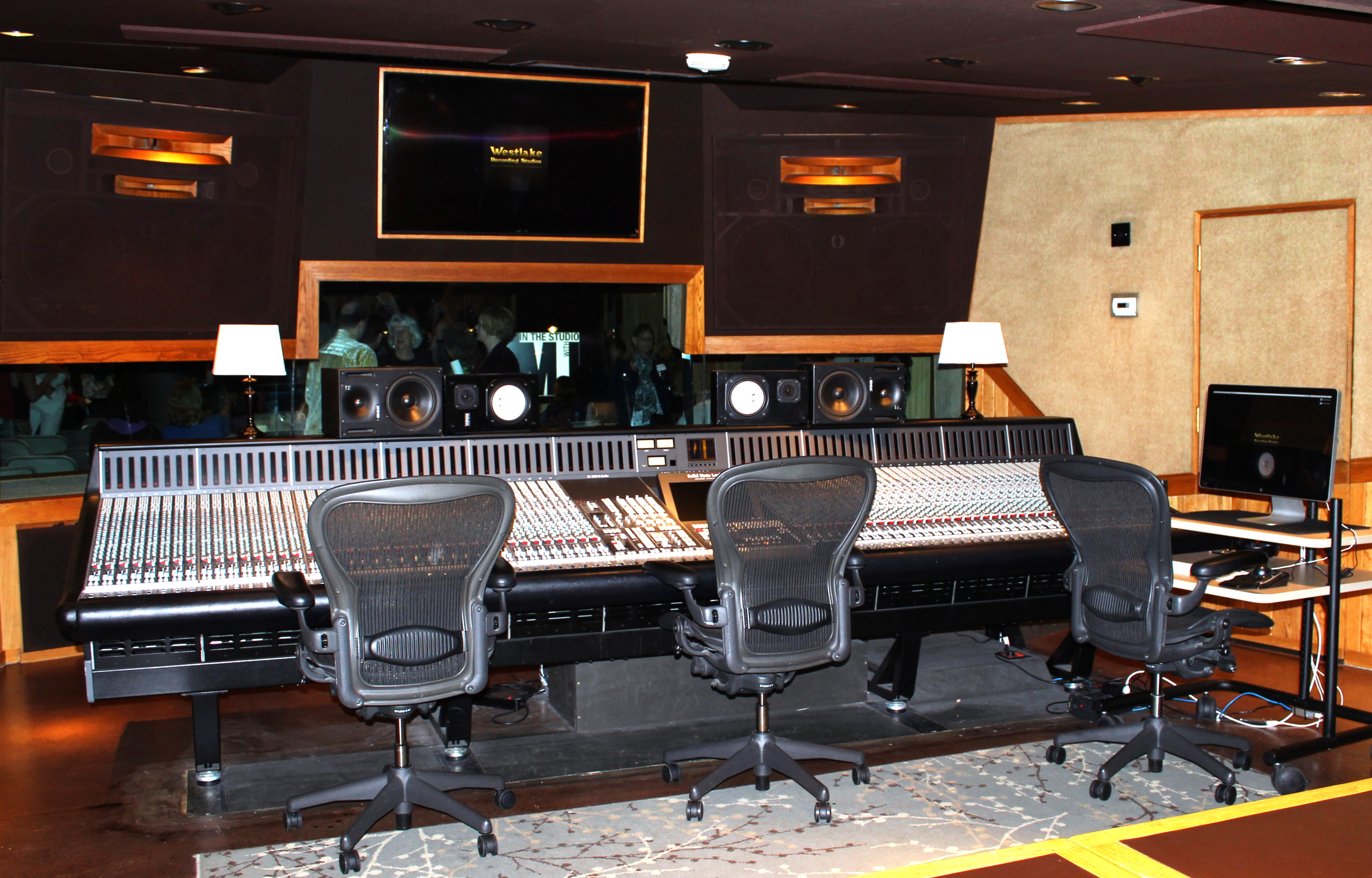
Westlake Recording Studios, one of the locations where In the Zone was recorded

For In the Zone, Spears worked with hit producers such as Bloodshy & Avant, R. Kelly, Diddy, Christopher Stewart, Moby, Guy Sigsworth and the Matrix. She first started writing songs for the album during her Dream Within a Dream Tour. Spears commented about writing while touring: "The only thing that was scary to me is that I didn't know if they were good. [But] You can't trust anybody. You have to go with your feelings." Spears commented that she was an autobiographical songwriter, although not to the point she felt self-exploited. Following the end of the tour, Spears invited her friend and backing vocalist Annet Artani to her home in Los Angeles. They started writing songs at the piano, and shortly after, they traveled to Lake Como in Lombardy, Italy. Among the tracks they worked on was "Everytime", which Artani confirmed to be written as a response to Justin Timberlake's "Cry Me a River", as well as "Shine", written by Spears about her sister Jamie Lynn, which was left unfinished. Earnest recording of the album began in November 2002. Spears commented that although she did not know initially what direction she wanted to go with the album, she took time to work with different producers and to find those who she had chemistry with. The first song recorded for In the Zone was "Touch of My Hand", and Spears said it "really did provide a balance for the rest of the record. We just went from there." Following the recording sessions for "Everytime" at the Conway Recording Studios in Los Angeles, Spears complimented Sigsworth, saying: "I just basically told him exactly how I wanted the song to sound. And he was so amazing because there's a lot of producers you tell them things and they don't get it. And you're like oh, that's not the right way. He got it just right. He was amazing."

Christopher Stewart and Penelope Magnet, known collectively as RedZone, presented Spears with the third song they had written and produced, titled "Pop Culture Whore". While her management liked the track, she rejected it, telling them the song "sucked". After bonding with Spears during a night in New York City to "get in her world", as Magnet explained, it was easier to "actually write and know what she would and wouldn't say, to know where her real vibe is". Stewart and Magnet began working on the first version of "Me Against the Music"; Stewart came up with the track, while Magnet developed the melody on a piano and some of the lyrics. During the recording sessions, Stewart recalls that the studio's air-conditioning died for three days, but Spears "didn't complain or anything, and for me that shows she's where she is for a reason." While rehearsing for their performance at the 2003 MTV Video Music Awards, Spears played a finished version of "Me Against the Music" to Madonna. After Madonna commented that she liked the track, Spears asked her to do the song with her. RedZone then handed "Me Against the Music" to Madonna, who arranged and recorded her vocal additions on her own, therefore making the song a duet. Spears, who had been a fan of Madonna for years, was "beyond surprised" when she heard Madonna's verse. She said "I just asked her to do a little thing, but she really went there. She did a lot of stuff to it." RedZone were then enlisted to work on several more songs for the album, including co-writing "Early Mornin'", recording background vocals for "Outrageous" and producing "The Hook Up".

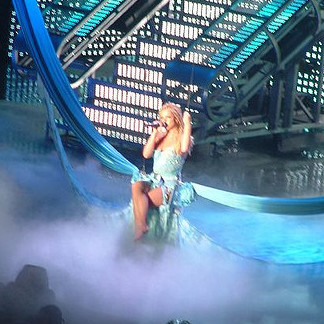
Spears performing "Shadow" during the Onyx Hotel Tour in 2004

The Matrix commented that after they presented songs to Spears, she tailored them to suit herself, especially the lyrics. Member Lauren Christy said: "... she really knows what she wants. She knows if she's trying something on that doesn't fit right for her. She's like, 'No, that's not me.' She's not one to strap on some sort of fake image." Christy also claimed to be impressed with Spears's vocal ability during the recording of "Shadow". Steve Anderson, Lisa Greene and Stephen Lee wrote "Breathe on Me" at Metrophonic Studios in London. Before meeting with the other writers, Anderson thought of two concepts for songs specifically for Spears: one he had worked on "for ages", and "Breathe on Me", which he drafted on the morning of the sessions. Greene and Lee did not like the first concept, and they wrote "Breathe on Me" with Anderson. The song was produced by Mark Taylor, who kept most of the programming done by Anderson. With Taylor, Spears recorded "Breathe on Me" and "And Then We Kiss", latter of which did not make the album. Other recording locations for the album included the Battery Studios, Daddy's House Recordings and The Dojo in New York City; 3:20 Studios, Decoy Studios, Pacifique Recording Studios, Record Plant and Westlake Recording Studios in Los Angeles; The Chocolate Factory, in Chicago, Triangle Sound Studios in Atlanta, Olympic Studios in London, and Murlyn Studios in Stockholm. Throughout 2003, Spears started testing tracks by playing them in nightclubs such as Show in New York City. Before the album was released, Spears' manager Larry Rudolph commented that it was important for Spears to continue moving away from a traditional pop sound, citing "I'm a Slave 4 U" and "Boys" from Britney as departures from her previous music. Barry Weiss, then-president of Jive Label Group, added: "She has achieved what she set out to achieve, which was to make a mature album that didn't sound like something she would have done three years while still making a commercial album that has hit singles. [...] It's the kind of record she should be doing right now, and it came down to her to make it."

== Music and lyrics ==
"Breathe on Me"
A 22-second sample of the song's chorus, with trip hop influences. The song was described as the most sensual of the album.

"Touch of My Hand"
A 24-second sample of the chorus of "Touch of My Hand". The instrumentation contains elements of Middle Eastern music and its lyrics refer to masturbation.

According to Billboard, In the Zone marked a musical departure for Spears. Instead of traditional pop, the album is darker and more dance-oriented. Spears talked about the overall sound of the album with Rolling Stone, saying: "I'd describe it as trance-y, kind of vibe record—something you could listen to that's no so song-structured [...] Of course I'm not doing '...Baby One More Time' and those massive hits anymore. I think this record is where I am at right now in my life. It's sensual, it's sexual. I'm probably writing about that subconsciously because I don't have that right now." Sal Cinquemani of Slant Magazine described the record's sound as "bold mix of hip-hop and dance music", while Amy Schriefer of NPR stated the album "mix[es] dance, house, crunk, Diwali beats and Neptunes-style hip hop". Tom Bishop of BBC News stated that the record combines bhaṅgṛā, R&B and hip hop. Caroline Sullivan of The Guardian deemed In the Zone "a happy collision of house, dreamy electro-pop and Britney’s lyrical preoccupations [...] which have her perched on the cusp between teen poppet and sexually confident woman." According to William Shaw of Blender, the main theme of In the Zone is "Spears’s awakening to her sexuality as a single woman."

"I just think once you start being so self-serving with your music... I did a little bit of that with the last record, and I really didn't want to put myself out there that much. I understand [when musicians write about personal things]. But when everything is about you, I just think.... Like, on this record, some of the songs, like 'Brave New Girl', I can relate to that song, but It's how personal you go. This record is definitely personal, but it's not shockingly personal – put it that way."

— Spears talks writing about personal experiences

In the Zone opens with "Me Against the Music", constructed as a duet with Madonna after she was added to the track. Spears and Madonna trade lines during the verses, and Madonna sings solo in the bridge. The instrumentation in the song includes influences of hip hop and funk guitars. The song's lyrics feature Spears and Madonna singing of the pleasures of letting go on the dancefloor, in "I'm up against the speaker / Trying to take on the music / It's like a competition". The second song, "I Got That (Boom Boom)", is an Atlanta-style hip hop track featuring the Ying Yang Twins. "Showdown" has "bubbly" beats and its lyrics, about "fighting and making up with carnal relations", include the lines "I don't really want to be a tease / But would you undo my zipper, please?" Rolling Stone classified the song pop-dancehall. "Breathe on Me" was described as the most sensual song of the record and compared to Madonna's 1992 studio album Erotica. On the Euro trance and ambient-techno song with trip hop influences, Spears sings: "Oh, it's so hot, and I need some air / And boy, don't stop 'cause I'm halfway there" and "Just put your lips together and blow." "Early Mornin'" depicts Spears looking for men at a club in New York City. The song has a percolating beat and featured subdued vocals from Spears, who purrs and yawns through the track. The nightclub Show is referenced. "Toxic", which Spears later named her favorite song from her career, was originally offered to Australian singer Kylie Minogue. It contains elements of hip hop, electropop, and bhangra music, and features varied instrumentation, such as drums, synthesizers, high-pitched strings and surf guitars. Lyrically, "Toxic" talks about being addicted to a lover.

"Outrageous" is a hip hop-inspired track which, according to MTV, features Spears "whisper[ing] and moan[ing] [...] with a snake charmer melody giving the song an exotic feel." The lyrics address materialism and amusement, with the singer referencing in the chorus a number of things that give her pleasure. On "Touch of My Hand", which Spears felt it was comparable to Janet Jackson's "That's the Way Love Goes" (1993), she sings in a lower register. The instrumentation contains elements of music from the Far East, particularly in its use of the Chinese instrument the erhu, and its lyrics refer to masturbation: "Into the unknown, I will be bold / I'm going to the places I can be out of control / And I don't want to explain tonight / All the things I've tried to hide." "The Hook Up" has a reggae feel and features Spears singing in a Jamaican Patois accent. The power ballad "Shadow" talks about how reminders of a lover can still linger after he's gone. The lyrics of "Brave New Girl" talk about a young woman finding her passion and losing inhibitions. Backed by choppy, electro-funk beats, she sings in a bouncy near-rap: "She's gonna pack her bags, she's going to find her way, she's going to get right out of this / She don't want New York, she don't want L.A., she's going to find that special kiss." The Eurodance and pop song was inspired by No Doubt, Blondie and Madonna. "Everytime" begins with a piano introduction accompanying Spears's breathy vocals, which build from soft to strong throughout the song. Its lyrics are a plea for forgiveness for inadvertently hurting a former lover. In the song, Spears explains she feels unable to continue in lines such as "Everytime I try to fly I fall / Without my wings I feel so small". During an interview with MTV, Spears said: "It's about heartbreak, it's about your first love, your first true love. That's something all people can relate to, because you all have that first love that you think you're going to be with the rest of your life." When asked if "Everytime" was about Justin Timberlake, she responded: "I'll let the song speak for itself." The Rishi Rich's Desi Kulcha Remix of "Me Against the Music" removes the original melody of the song and adds a clattering backbeat and Punjabi shouts. On the international editions bonus track "The Answer", Spears sings that her lover is the answer to all her needs: "Who can hold me tight, keep me warm through the night? / Who can wipe my tears when it's wrong, make it right? / Who can give me love till I'm satisfied? / Who's the one I need in my life?". On the Australian, Japanese and UK editions bonus track "Don't Hang Up", she pleads on the phone for her lover to keep her satisfied long-distance.

== Release and promotion ==
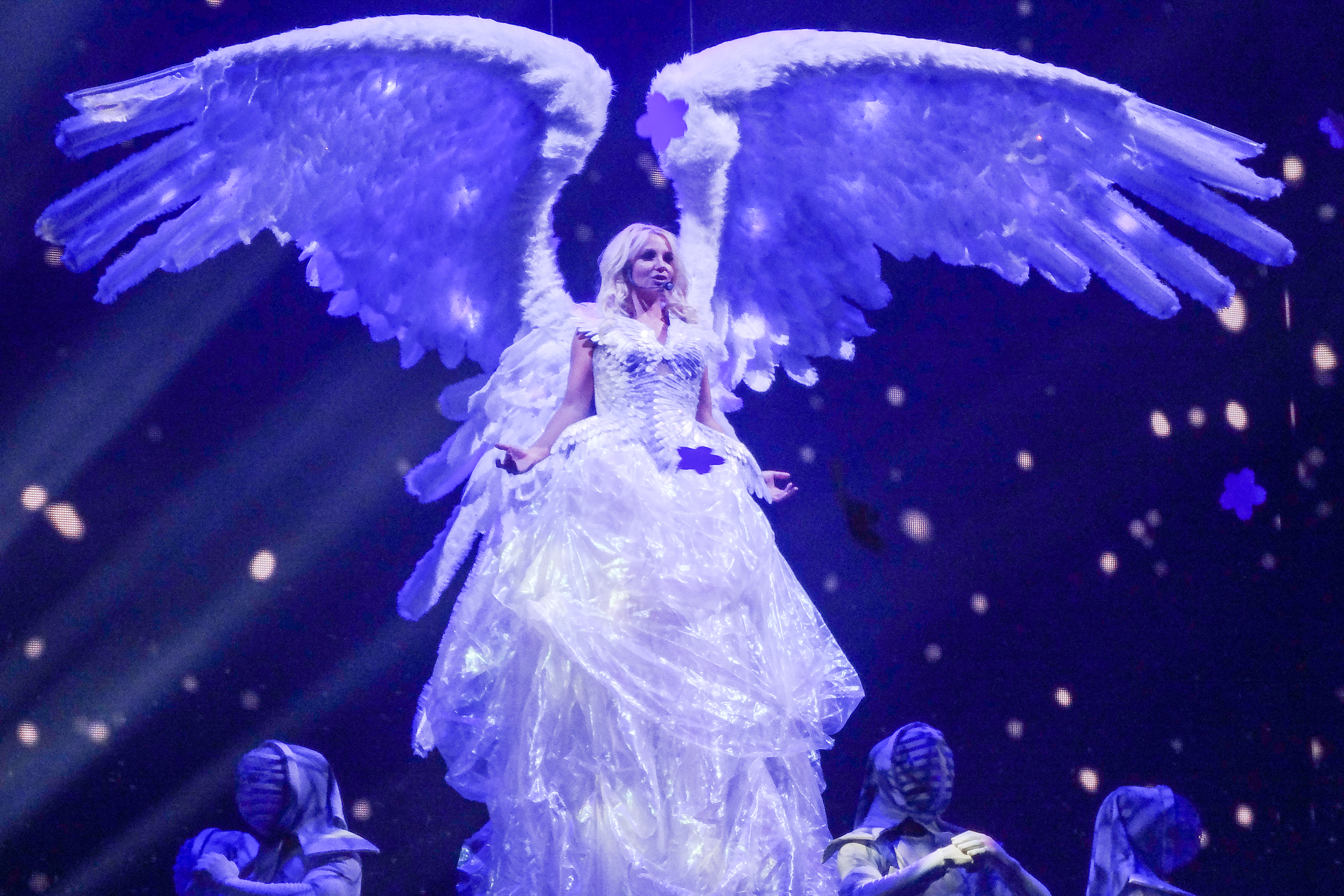
Spears performing "Everytime" during her Las Vegas concert residency Britney: Piece of Me in 2014

To promote In the Zone, Spears first performed the lead single "Me Against the Music" at the 2003 NFL Kickoff Live on September 4, 2003. The performance segued into a medley of "...Baby One More Time" and "I'm a Slave 4 U", which included pyrotechnics. On September 14, Spears played a surprise concert at Rain Nightclub in the Palms Casino Resort, and performed "Me Against the Music", "Breathe on Me" and a medley of "...Baby One More Time" and "I'm a Slave 4 U". On October 18, she performed "Me Against the Music" and "Everytime" on Saturday Night Live. Spears opened the 2003 American Music Awards on November 16 with a performance of "Me Against the Music". The following day, a concert special titled Britney Spears: In the Zone aired on American Broadcasting Company (ABC). On November 18–the day In the Zone was released in the United States–she performed "Me Against the Music" and "(I Got That) Boom Boom" on Total Request Live at Times Square. The ABC special and Total Request Live performances would later be included on video album Britney Spears: In the Zone, released on April 6, 2004. The video debuted atop the US Music Video Sales and was certified double platinum by the Recording Industry Association of America (RIAA). "Me Against the Music" was also performed on The Tonight Show with Jay Leno on November 17, 2003, and on Live with Regis and Kelly on November 24. She also performed "Toxic", "Breathe on Me" and "Me Against the Music" as the headliner of the Jingle Ball on December 8, at the Staples Center.

In November 2003, Zomba Label Group president Barry Weiss had spoken to Billboard and said that In the Zone was being promoted on a global level, exhausting areas such as print and electronic media, television, radio and video to raise awareness of its release. In addition, Jive worked with lifestyle marketer the Karpel Group to market the album to the gay community. Other broader-based marketing efforts included a tie-in with marketing company LidRock, where after ordering a soda at Sbarro, customers received a cup featuring the artwork and a three-inch disc in the lid featuring "Brave New Girl" and songs by two other artists; in December, an updated LidRock disc was made available, including a remix of "Me Against the Music" without Madonna, as well as songs by fellow Jive acts Nick Cannon and Bowling for Soup. Regal Theaters also showed a short film that included footage of the making of Spears's music videos. Two national television advertising campaigns had begun on November 1–one with a teaser ad on Saturday Night Live and another exclusively on MTV. No sponsored cross-marketing campaigns were planned, as Larry Rudolph explained: "[This time] it's going to be more about the music than about corporate tie-ins." In terms of international exposure, during a four-month period Spears was featured in seven mini TV-specials and over 150 interviews outside the US. Among the international performances were Spears opening the NRJ Music Awards in France with "Toxic" on January 24, 2004, and a performance of "Everytime" on the June 25 episode of Top of the Pops in the United Kingdom, which became the final televised performance in support of the album.

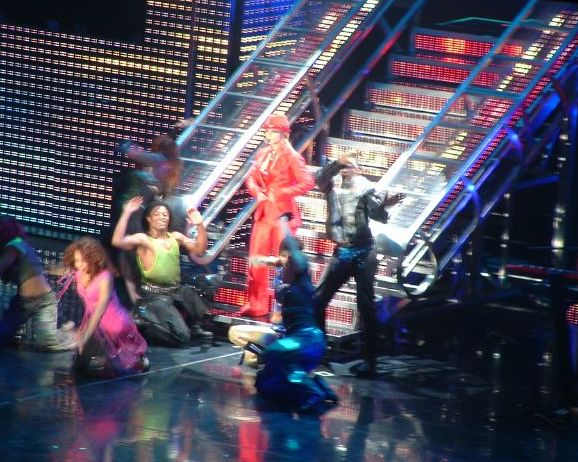
Spears closing a show of the Onyx Hotel Tour by performing "Me Against the Music" in 2004

A tour to further promote In the Zone was announced in December 2003, originally titled In the Zone Tour. However, Spears was sued for trademark infringement by the San Diego company Lite Breeze, Inc. and was banned from using the phrase "in the zone", hence the tour's title was changed to The Onyx Hotel Tour. It commenced on March 2, 2004 at the San Diego Sports Arena. Spears felt inspired to create a show with a hotel theme which she later mixed with the concept of an onyx stone. The stage, inspired by Broadway musicals, was less elaborate than her previous tours. The setlist was composed mostly by songs from In the Zone as well as some of her past songs reworked with different elements of jazz, blues and Latin percussion. Tour promoter Clear Channel Entertainment marketed the tour to a more adult audience than her previous shows, while sponsor MTV highly promoted the tour on television shows and the network's website. The tour was divided into seven segments: Check-In, Mystic Lounge, Mystic Garden, The Onyx Zone, Security Cameras, Club and the encore. Check-In displayed performances with dance and advanced in the hotel theme. Mystic Lounge featured an homage to Cabaret and other musicals, while remixing some of Spears's early hits. Mystic Garden displayed a jungle-inspired stage. The Onyx Zone displayed a ballad performance with acrobats. Security Cameras was the raciest part of the show, with Spears and her dancers emulating different sexual practices. Club displayed a performance with urban influences. The encore consisted of a system malfunction interlude and Spears performed wearing a red ensemble. The tour received mixed reviews from contemporary critics, who praised it for being an entertaining show while criticizing it for looking "more [like] a spectacle than an actual concert". The Onyx Hotel Tour was commercially successful, grossing $34 million. In March, Spears suffered a knee injury onstage which forced her to reschedule two shows. On June 8, Spears fell and hurt her knee again while filming the accompanying music video for "Outrageous". She underwent surgery and the remainder of the tour was cancelled.

== Singles ==
"Me Against the Music" was released as the lead single from In the Zone on October 14, 2003. Jive Records' choice for the first single was originally "Outrageous", but Spears convinced them to release "Me Against the Music". The song received mixed reviews from music critics; some felt it was a strong dance track, while others referred to it as lackluster and disappointing. "Me Against the Music" achieved international commercial success, peaking atop of the charts in countries such as Australia, Denmark, Hungary, Ireland and Spain, as well as the European Hot 100 Singles. It also peaked at number two in Canada, Italy, Norway and the United Kingdom, and inside the top five in many other countries. In the United States, the song peaked at number 35 on the Billboard Hot 100, being Spears' lowest-charting lead single. The song won the Hot Dance Single of the Year award at the 2004 Billboard Music Awards. In the song's accompanying music video, directed by Paul Hunter, Spears chases Madonna inside a nightclub.

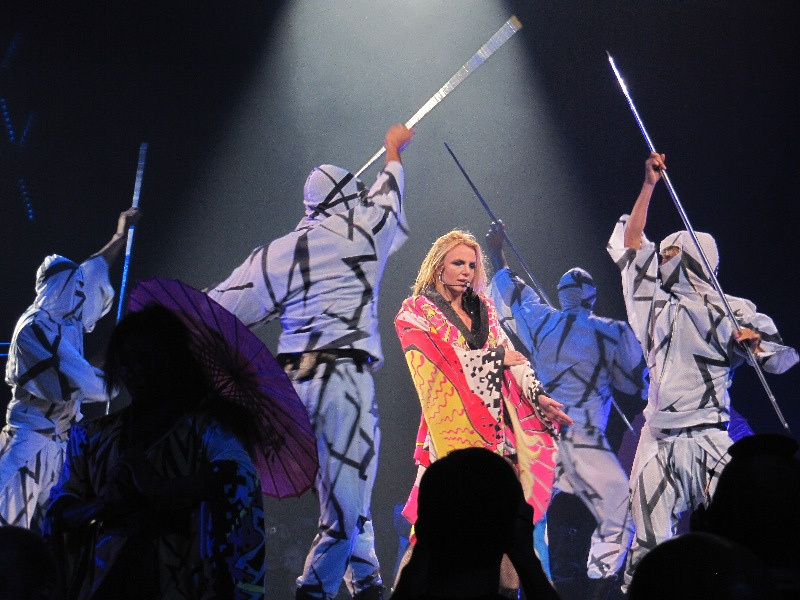
Spears performing In the Zone's second single "Toxic" during the Femme Fatale Tour in 2011

"Toxic" was released as the second single from In the Zone on January 12, 2004, to widespread critical acclaim. After trying to choose between Jive's suggestions "(I Got That) Boom Boom" and "Outrageous", Spears selected "Toxic" instead. It attained worldwide commercial success, reaching the top five in 15 countries, while topping the charts in Australia, Canada, Hungary, Norway and the United Kingdom. In the United States, it peaked at number nine on the Billboard Hot 100, becoming her first single to peak inside the top ten since "Oops!... I Did It Again" (2000). Directed by Joseph Kahn, the accompanying music video for the song portrays Spears as a secret agent in the search of a vial of green liquid. After she steals it, she enters an apartment and poisons her unfaithful boyfriend. The video also includes interspersed scenes of Spears naked with diamonds over her body. "Toxic" won Spears her only Grammy Award, for Best Dance Recording (2005), and is often referred to as one of her signature songs.

"Everytime" was released as the third single from In the Zone on May 10, 2004, to critical acclaim. A commercial success, it peaked within the top five in most countries, while reaching the top of the charts in Australia, Hungary, Ireland and the United Kingdom, and number 15 on the US Billboard Hot 100. Its accompanying music video, directed by David LaChapelle, portrays Spears as a star hounded by paparazzi, who drowns in her bathtub when she starts bleeding from a wound in her head. In the hospital, doctors fail to resuscitate her while a child is born in the next room, implying she reincarnated. The original treatment would have had Spears killing herself from a drug overdose, but the plot was removed after it received criticism by several organizations, who perceived it as a glamorization of suicide.

"Outrageous" was released as the fourth and final single from In the Zone on July 13, 2004. The song was finally chosen as a single after it was selected as the theme song for the film Catwoman (2004). It received mixed reviews from critics, as some praised its funky sound, noting its influence from Michael and Janet Jackson, while others deemed it "forgettable". Plagued by low promotion, the song became the album's lowest-charting single, peaking at number 79 on the US Billboard Hot 100. Directed by Dave Meyers, its accompanying music video was being filmed in New York City on June 8, when Spears injured her knee and had to undergo arthroscopic surgery. The video was cancelled, as well as the remainder of the Onyx Hotel Tour and the feature in the Catwoman soundtrack.

== Critical reception ==
Professional ratings
Aggregate scores
Source	Rating
Metacritic	66/100
Review scores
Source	Rating
About.com	4/5 stars
AllMusic	3/5 stars
Blender	4/5 stars
E!	B+
Entertainment Weekly	B−
The Guardian	4/5 stars
Rolling Stone	3/5 stars
Slant Magazine	3/5 stars
Spin	B−
Vibe	3.5/5 stars

Upon its release, In the Zone received generally favorable reviews from music critics. At Metacritic, which assigns a normalized rating out of 100 to reviews from mainstream critics, the album received an average score of 66, based on 13 reviews. Jason Shawhan of About.com gave a positive review, saying that while the album's vibe is sexy, the result is a personal statement from Spears. He also added: "T[here]'s another thing about Spears' new record, as none of her previous albums ever managed to produce any kind of sustained emotional response than the pleasure that comes from a good pop record. I miss Max Martin, for sure, but it feels like Ms. S. has been paying attention to La Ciccone. To put it another way, this is Britney's True Blue." Stephen Thomas Erlewine of AllMusic said that the album "[is] all club-ready, but despite some hints of neo-electro and the Neptunes, it doesn't quite sound modern—it sounds like cuts from 1993 or Madonna's Bedtime Stories and Ray of Light. Production-wise, these tracks are not only accomplished but much more varied than any of her previous albums." Ruth Mitchell of the BBC called "Early Mornin'" the best track from the album, but added: "Sadly, her attempts to prove her new-found maturity are what overwhelm and cloud all that is good about In The Zone." Mim Udovitch of Blender commented: "This I'm-coming-out record is an unhesitant move from songs of the heart to songs of the groin [...] No longer a girl, freed from slavery, now fully a woman, she makes a pretty convincing mistress."

David Browne of Entertainment Weekly called "Brave New Girl" and "Touch of My Hand" the best and most straightforward moments of In the Zone, but added that "On a CD intended to celebrate her lurch into adulthood, Spears remains distant and submerged. For all her freedom, she's still finding her way." Jon Pareles of Rolling Stone said: "[Spears'] voice is so processed, its physicality almost disappears. [...] In the Zone offers strip-club, 1-900 sex, accommodating and hollow. Beyond the glittering beats, Spears sounds about as intimate as a blowup doll." Sal Cinquemani of Slant Magazine stated: "Britney's fourth album, In The Zone, finds the pop tart coming of age with a bold mix of hip-hop and dance music, wiping clean the last traces of her bubblegum-pop past. [...] For the most part, In The Zone is a big, fat, thumping love letter to the dancefloor, which makes Madonna's involvement [...] even more appropriate." Dorian Lynskey of The Guardian commented: "Unlike previous Britney albums, In the Zone has no filler and no shoddy cover versions, just 57 varieties of blue-chip hit-factory pop. There is southern hip-hop, deep house, Neptunes-style R&B, the ubiquitous Diwali beat and, most importantly, oodles of Madonna." Jason King of Vibe deemed it as "A supremely confident dance record that also illustrates Spears's development as a songwriter."

== Accolades ==
Awards and nominations for In the Zone
Year	Award	Category	Nominee(s)	Result	Ref.
2004	Japan Gold Disc Award	International Rock Albums of the Year	In the Zone	Won	
2004	Premios Oye!	English Album of the Year	In the Zone	Nominated	
2004	Billboard Music Award	Female Billboard 200 Album Artist of the Year	Britney Spears	Nominated	
2005	Grammy Award	Best Dance Recording	"Toxic"	Won	

== Commercial performance ==
In the United States, In the Zone debuted atop the Billboard 200 chart dated December 6, 2003, with first-week sales of 609,000 copies. It initially registered the highest first-week sales of 2003 for a female artist, before Alicia Keys surpassed Spears with The Diary of Alicia Keys two weeks later. In the Zone was certified triple platinum by the Recording Industry Association of America (RIAA) in October 2023, for album-equivalent units of three million copies. It placed at number eight on the year-end Billboard 200 for 2004. As of 2016, it has sold over three million copies in the country, according to Nielsen SoundScan. In Canada, the album debuted at number two on the Canadian Albums Chart, with first-week sales of 31,000 units. It was certified triple platinum by the Canadian Recording Industry Association (CRIA) for shipments of 300,000 copies.

In the United Kingdom, In the Zone debuted at number 14 on the UK Albums Chart, selling 39,000 copies in its first week, and peaked at number 13 in its 34th week, spending a total of 43 weeks on the chart. It was certified platinum by the British Phonographic Industry (BPI) in March 2004. The album attained higher peaks across mainland Europe, reaching the top ten in Austria, Belgium, the Czech Republic, Denmark, Germany, Greece, Hungary, Ireland, the Netherlands, Sweden and Switzerland, and peaking at number three on the European Top 100 Albums. In France, it debuted at number one, becoming her second number-one album in the country after Oops!... I Did It Again (2000), and was certified double gold by the Syndicat National de l'Édition Phonographique (SNEP) in December 2004. It was certified platinum by the IFPI in April, for selling one million copies across Europe.

Across Latin America, In the Zone was certified platinum in Argentina and Mexico. In Australia, the album debuted and peaked at number ten on the ARIA Top 100 Albums. It was certified platinum by the Australian Recording Industry Association (ARIA) in 2004. In New Zealand, it debuted at number 28; in April 2004, it peaked at number 25 and was certified gold by the Recording Industry Association of New Zealand (RIANZ).

The album was a commercial success across Asia, debuting at number one in South Korea. In Japan, the album debuted at number three on the Oricon Albums Chart, selling 59,128 copies in its first week. It was certified platinum by the Recording Industry Association of Japan (RIAJ) in December 2003. In Thailand, the album sold 50,000 copies within three months of its release. According to the International Federation of the Phonographic Industry (IFPI), In the Zone was the eighth best-selling album of 2003.

== Legacy ==
In the Zone has been declared a metamorphosis for Spears by numerous critics. Stephen Thomas Erlewine of AllMusic commented: "If 2001's Britney was a transitional album, capturing Spears at the point when she wasn't a girl and not yet a woman, its 2003 follow-up, In the Zone, is where she has finally completed that journey and turned into Britney, the Adult Woman." Erlewine equated Spears to a "girl next door cutting loose at college, drinking and smoking and dancing and sexing just a little too recklessly, since this is the first time she can indulge herself." Sal Cinquemani of Slant Magazine stated: "For a girl who's always seemed too sexed-up for her age, In the Zone finds Britney finally filling her britches, so-to-speak. Her little girl coquettishness actually works now—maybe because, at 21, she's finally a woman." Jason King of Vibe said the album showcased a transformed Spears, "no longer a girl, and all the woman any man can handle."

Music critics have credited In the Zone for influencing pop music of the 2000s. In 2009, Amy Schriefer of NPR listed the album among the "50 Most Important Recordings of the Decade". Calling it "a primer on the sound of pop in the '00s", she deemed Spears as the ideal vehicle for a futuristic sound, since she was still trying to break away from her teen pop past. Schriefer praised "Toxic" and "Everytime", and added: "While the decade's history of celebrity obsession, paparazzi voyeurism and conflicted constructions of female sexuality and motherhood are written on Spears' body, the decade's history of impeccably crafted pop is written on her body of work." Celebrating the album's 15th anniversary in 2018, Jason Lipshutz of Billboard claimed it "signaled a more mature direction for Spears as she explored electronic music and hip-hop like never before. And the record's lyrics — which referenced her breakup with Justin Timberlake and pushed back at her critics in the media — celebrated new levels of independence and candor for the singer."

Los Angeles pop-up museum The Zone, celebrating Spears' "iconic songs, videos, and outfits through Instagram-worthy photo ops, interactive displays and personalized content activated by special RFID wristbands", was titled after the album and opened in January 2020.

== Track listing ==
In the Zone track listing
No.	Title	Writer(s)	Producer(s)	Length
1.	"Me Against the Music" (featuring Madonna)	Britney Spears; Madonna; Christopher "Tricky" Stewart; Thabiso "Tab" Nkhereanye; Penelope Magnet; Terius Nash; Gary O'Brien	Trixster; Magnet^{[a]}	3:43
2.	"(I Got That) Boom Boom" (featuring Ying Yang Twins)	Roy "Royalty" Hamilton; Chyna Royal; Raphael Hamilton; Deongelo Holmes; Eric Jackson	Roy "Royalty" Hamilton	4:51
3.	"Showdown"	Spears; Cathy Dennis; Christian Karlsson; Pontus Winnberg; Henrik Jonback	Bloodshy & Avant	3:18
4.	"Breathe on Me"	Stephen Lee; Steve Anderson; Lisa Greene	Mark Taylor	3:43
5.	"Early Mornin'"	Spears; Moby; Stewart; Magnet	Moby; Trixster^{[b]}; Magnet^{[b]}	3:45
6.	"Toxic"	Dennis; Karlsson; Winnberg; Jonback	Bloodshy & Avant	3:21
7.	"Outrageous"	R. Kelly	Kelly; Trixster^{[b]}; Magnet^{[b]}	3:22
8.	"Touch of My Hand"	Spears; Jimmy Harry; Balewa Muhammad; Shep Solomon	Harry; Solomon	4:19
9.	"The Hook Up"	Spears; Stewart; Nkhereanye; Magnet	Trixster; Magnet^{[a]}	3:54
10.	"Shadow"	Spears; Lauren Christy; Scott Spock; Graham Edwards; Charlie Midnight	The Matrix	3:45
11.	"Brave New Girl"	Spears; Brian Kierulf; Josh Schwartz; Kara DioGuardi	Brian and Josh	3:30
12.	"Everytime"	Spears; Annet Artani	Guy Sigsworth	3:53
13.	"Me Against the Music" (Rishi Rich's Desi Kulcha Remix) (featuring Madonna) (bonus track)	Spears; Madonna; Stewart; Nkhereanye; Magnet; Nash; O'Brien	Trixster; Magnet^{[a]}; Rishi Rich^{[c]}	4:31
Total length:				49:55

International bonus track
No.	Title	Writer(s)	Producer(s)	Length
14.	"The Answer"	Ryan Leslie; Sean "P. Diddy" Combs	Combs; Leslie	3:55
Total length:				53:50

Australian, Japanese, and UK bonus track
No.	Title	Writer(s)	Producer(s)	Length
15.	"Don't Hang Up"	Spears; Kierulf; Schwartz	Brian and Josh	4:02
Total length:				57:52

=== Notes ===
- ^{^[a]} signifies a co-producer
- ^{^[b]} signifies a vocal producer
- ^{^[c]} signifies an additional producer
- Walmart-exclusive limited edition includes bonus downloads for "(I've Just Begun) Having My Fun" and Bloodshy & Avant's Chix Mix of "Me Against the Music". The tracks were subsequently included on international edition bonus CD for the DVD In the Zone (2004).
- DVD-Audio edition includes a bonus DVD which features the music videos of "Me Against the Music" and "Toxic", a photo gallery and on-screen lyrics.
- DualDisc edition includes a bonus DVD which features the music videos of "Toxic" and "Everytime" and a Chris Cox Megamix (Note: "Chris Cox Megamix" comprises "...Baby One More Time", "(You Drive Me) Crazy", "I'm a Slave 4 U", "Oops!... I Did It Again", "Stronger", "Everytime" and "Toxic".).

=== Sample credits ===
- "Toxic" contains a sample of "Tere Mere Beech Mein" by Lata Mangeshkar and S. P. Balasubrahmanyam from the film Ek Duuje Ke Liye (1981).

== Personnel ==
Credits are adapted from the liner notes of In the Zone.

- Ed Alton – string arrangement (track 8)
- Steve Anderson – keyboards (track 4), programming (track 4), songwriting (track 4)
- J.D. Andrew – engineering assistance (tracks 3 and 6)
- Annet Artani – songwriting (track 12)
- Steve Bearsley – engineering assistance (track 7)
- Tom Bender – engineering assistance (track 10)
- BlackCell – backing vocals (tracks 3 and 6)
- Bloodshy & Avant – arrangement (tracks 3 and 6), digital editing (tracks 3 and 6), engineering (tracks 3 and 6), instrumentation (tracks 3 and 6), production (tracks 3 and 6), programming (tracks 3 and 6), songwriting (tracks 3 and 6)
- Ray Brown – styling
- B.U.D. – backing vocals (track 9)
- Sean "P. Diddy" Combs – production (track 14), songwriting (track 14)
- Fran Cooper – make-up
- Courtney Copeland – backing vocals (tracks 1 and 13)
- Josh Copp – engineering assistance (track 2)
- Tom Coyne – mastering (all tracks)
- Cathy Dennis – backing vocals (tracks 3 and 6), songwriting (tracks 3 and 6)
- DaCorna Boyz – keyboards (track 9)
- Patrick Demarchelier – photography
- Kara DioGuardi – backing vocals (track 11), songwriting (track 11)
- Dan Dymtrow – management representation
- Roxanne Estrada – backing vocals (tracks 1, 7, 9 and 13)
- Niklas Flyckt – mixing (tracks 3 and 6)
- Chriss Fudurich – engineering (track 8)
- Matt Furmidge – engineering assistance (track 4)
- Andy Gallas – engineering (track 7)
- Abel Garibaldi – engineering (track 7), programming (track 7)
- Roy Gartrell – banjo (track 2), guitar (track 2)
- Şerban Ghenea – mixing (tracks 1, 2, 5, 7 and 9)
- Brad Gilderman – engineering (track 8)
- Lori Goldstein – styling
- Lisa Greene – backing vocals (track 4), songwriting (track 4)
- Mick Guzauski – mixing (track 10)
- Rob Haggert – engineering assistance (tracks 1, 8 and 13)
- Chris Haggerty – digital editing (track 3)
- Roy "Royalty" Hamilton – arrangement (track 2), backing vocals (track 2), instrumentation (track 2), production (track 2), songwriting (track 2)
- Dug Hanes – Pro-Tools engineering (track 5)
- John Hanes – digital editing (tracks 1, 7, 9 and 13), Pro-Tools engineering (tracks 2 and 5)
- Jimmy Harry – arrangement (track 8), guitar (track 8), keyboards (track 8), production (track 8), programming (track 8), songwriting (track 8)
- Emma Holmgren – backing vocals (tracks 3 and 6)
- Vance Hornbuckle – engineering assistance (track 5)
- Isabel – make-up
- Janson & Janson – string arrangement (track 6), string conduction (track 6)
- Henrik Jonback – guitar (tracks 3 and 6), songwriting (tracks 3 and 6)
- Juggy D – backing vocals (track 13)
- Jennifer Karr – backing vocals (track 11)
- R. Kelly – backing vocals (track 7), mixing (track 7), production (track 7), songwriting (track 7)
- Brian Kierulf – engineering (tracks 11 and 15), guitar (track 11), keyboards (tracks 11 and 15), production (tracks 11 and 15), programming (tracks 11 and 15), songwriting (tracks 11 and 15), vocal editing (tracks 11 and 15), vocal engineering (tracks 11 and 15)
- Laurentius – hair
- Stephen Lee – songwriting (track 4)
- Kyron Leslie – backing vocals (track 5)
- Ryan Leslie – instrumentation (track 14), production (track 14), songwriting (track 14)
- Vanessa Letocq – production coordination (track 4)
- Vivien Lewit – legal representation
- Thomas Lindberg – bass (tracks 3 and 6)
- Paul Logus – mixing (track 14)
- Stephanie Louise – hair, make-up
- Steve Lunt – A&R, arrangement (tracks 1–3, 6, 9 and 13)
- Donnie Lyle – guitar (track 7)
- Madonna – songwriting (tracks 1 and 13), vocals (tracks 1 and 13)
- Penelope Magnet – arrangement (tracks 1 and 9), backing vocals (tracks 1, 5, 7, 9 and 13), production (tracks 1, 9 and 13), songwriting (tracks 1, 5, 9 and 13), vocal arrangement (tracks 5 and 7), vocal production (tracks 5 and 7)
- Marla Weinhoff Studio – set design
- The Matrix – arrangement (track 10), backing vocals (track 10), engineering (track 10), production (track 10), songwriting (track 10)
- Charles McCrorey – engineering assistance (tracks 1 and 13)
- Sean McGhee – editing (track 12), engineering (track 12), mixing (track 12)
- Mentor – keyboards (track 13)
- Ian Mereness – engineering (track 7), programming (track 7)
- Charlie Midnight – songwriting (track 10)
- Jason Mlodzinski – engineering assistance (track 7)
- Moby – engineering (track 5), instrumentation (track 5), production (track 5), programming (track 5), songwriting (track 5)
- Lyn Montrose – engineering assistance (track 14)
- Balewa Muhammad – songwriting (track 8)
- Pablo Munguia – engineering (tracks 2 and 4)
- Jackie Murphy – art direction, packaging design
- Terius Nash – songwriting (tracks 1 and 13)
- Andrew Nast – engineering assistance (track 10)
- Kendall Nesbitt – keyboards (track 7)
- Thabiso "Tab" Nkhereanye – songwriting (tracks 1, 9 and 13)
- Gary O'Brien – guitar (tracks 1, 9 and 13), songwriting (tracks 1 and 13)
- Oribe – hair
- Jonas Östman – engineering assistance (tracks 3 and 6)
- Pardeep Sandhu Orchestra – algozee (track 13), tumbi (track 13)
- Rob Paustian – engineering (track 14)
- Ranjit – photography
- Jason Rankins – engineering assistance (track 2)
- Rishi Rich – programming (track 13), remix production (track 13)
- Emma Roads – backing vocals (tracks 1 and 13)
- Tim Roberts – engineering assistance (tracks 1, 2, 5, 7, 9 and 13)
- Chyna Royal – backing vocals (track 2), songwriting (track 2)
- Larry Rudolph – management
- Josh Schwartz – backing vocals (track 15), engineering (tracks 11 and 15), guitar (tracks 11 and 15), production (tracks 11 and 15), songwriting (tracks 11 and 15)
- Alexis Seaton – engineering assistance (track 14)
- Guy Sigsworth – instrumentation (track 12), production (track 12)
- Slam – production coordination (track 14)
- Shep Solomon – production (track 8), songwriting (track 8)
- Britney Spears – arrangement (tracks 1 and 9), songwriting (tracks 1, 3, 5, 8–13 and 15), vocals (all tracks)
- Mark "Spike" Stent – mixing (tracks 1 and 8), vocal engineering (tracks 1 and 13)
- Mary Alice Stephenson – styling
- Christopher Stewart – arrangement (tracks 1 and 9), backing vocals (track 5), instrumentation (tracks 1 and 9), production (tracks 1, 9 and 13), programming (tracks 1 and 9), songwriting (tracks 1, 5, 9 and 13), vocal arrangement (tracks 5 and 7), vocal production (tracks 5 and 7)
- Stockholm Session Strings – strings (track 6)
- Rich Tapper – engineering (track 2), engineering assistance (tracks 4, 5, 7 and 9)
- Mark Taylor – engineering (track 4), mixing (track 4), production (track 4)
- Brian "B-Luv" Thomas – digital editing (tracks 1, 5, 7, 9 and 13), engineering (tracks 1 and 9), vocal engineering (tracks 5, 7 and 13)
- David Treahearn – engineering assistance (tracks 1, 8 and 13)
- Mike Tucker – vocal editing (tracks 11 and 15), vocal engineering (tracks 11 and 15)
- Seth Waldmann – engineering assistance (track 12)
- P-Dub Walton – digital editing (tracks 1, 8 and 13)
- Nathan Wheeler – engineering assistance (track 7)
- The Wizardz of Oz – backing vocals (track 10)
- Dan Yashiv – digital editing (track 8)
- Ying Yang Twins – songwriting (track 2), vocals (track 2)
- Jong Uk Yoon – engineering assistance (track 4)
- Tony Zeller – engineering assistance (tracks 11 and 15)

== Charts ==
=== Weekly charts ===
Weekly chart performance
Chart (2003–2004)	Peak position
Argentine Albums (CAPIF)	1
Australian Albums (ARIA)	10
Austrian Albums (Ö3 Austria)	10
Belgian Albums (Ultratop Flanders)	7
Belgian Albums (Ultratop Wallonia)	5
Canadian Albums (Billboard)	2
Czech Albums (ČNS IFPI)	32
Danish Albums (Hitlisten)	8
Dutch Albums (Album Top 100)	9
European Top 100 Albums (Billboard)	3
Finnish Albums (Suomen virallinen lista)	15
French Albums (SNEP)	1
German Albums (Offizielle Top 100)	2
Greek Albums (IFPI)	1
Hungarian Albums (MAHASZ)	7
Icelandic Albums (Tónlist)	8
Irish Albums (IRMA)	4
Italian Albums (FIMI)	16
Japanese Albums (Oricon)	3
Malaysian International Albums (RIM)	4
Mexican Albums (AMPROFON)	1
New Zealand Albums (RMNZ)	25
Norwegian Albums (VG-lista)	11
Polish Albums (ZPAV)	23
Portuguese Albums (AFP)	11
Scottish Albums (Official Charts)	12
Singaporean Albums (RIAS)	2
South African Albums (RISA)	14
South Korean International Albums (RIAK)	1
Spanish Albums (PROMUSICAE)	14
Swedish Albums (Sverigetopplistan)	8
Swiss Albums (Schweizer Hitparade)	6
UK Albums (Official Charts)	13
US Billboard 200	1

Weekly chart performance during 2023
Chart (2023)	Peak position
Spanish Albums (PROMUSICAE)	63

=== Year-end charts ===
Year-end chart performance
Chart (2003)	Position
French Albums (SNEP)	75
South Korean International Albums (MIAK)	5
Swiss Albums (Schweizer Hitparade)	84
UK Albums (OCC)	145
Worldwide Albums (IFPI)	8

Year-end chart performance
Chart (2004)	Position
Australian Albums (ARIA)	49
Austrian Albums (Ö3 Austria)	36
Belgian Albums (Ultratop Flanders)	86
Belgian Albums (Ultratop Wallonia)	93
Dutch Albums (Album Top 100)	84
European Top 100 Albums (Billboard)	23
French Albums (SNEP)	68
German Albums (Offizielle Top 100)	35
Hungarian Albums (MAHASZ)	17
Japanese Albums (Oricon)	40
South Korean International Albums (MIAK)	3
Swiss Albums (Schweizer Hitparade)	49
UK Albums (OCC)	51
US Billboard 200	8

=== Decade-end charts ===
Decade-end chart performance
Chart (2000–2009)	Position
US Billboard 200	143

== Certifications and sales ==
Certifications and sales
Region	Certification	Certified units/sales
Argentina (CAPIF)	Platinum	40,000^{^}
Australia (ARIA)	Platinum	70,000^{^}
Austria (IFPI Austria)	Platinum	30,000^{*}
Belgium (BRMA)	Gold	25,000^{*}
Brazil (Pro-Música Brasil)	Gold	50,000^{*}
Canada (Music Canada)	3× Platinum	300,000^{^}
Czech Republic	—	10,000
Denmark (IFPI Danmark)	2× Platinum	40,000^{‡}
Finland (Musiikkituottajat)	Gold	15,052
France (SNEP)	2× Gold	200,000^{*}
Germany (BVMI)	Platinum	200,000^{‡}
Greece (IFPI Greece)	Gold	10,000^{^}
Hungary (MAHASZ)	Gold	10,000^{^}
Japan (RIAJ)	Platinum	250,000^{^}
Mexico (AMPROFON)	Platinum	100,000^{^}
New Zealand (RMNZ)	Gold	7,500^{^}
Norway (IFPI Norway)	Gold	20,000^{*}
Poland (ZPAV)	Platinum	20,000^{‡}
Portugal (AFP)	Gold	20,000^{^}
Russia (NFPF)	2× Platinum	40,000^{*}
Singapore (RIAS)	Gold	5,000^{*}
South Korea	—	130,025 (Note: In South Korea, In the Zone sold 71,145 copies within the last two months of 2003, and sold additional 58,880 copies throughout 2004, according to the Korea Music Content Industry Association, bringing the sales total to 130,025 copies.)
Spain (Promusicae)	Gold	50,000^{^}
Sweden (GLF)	Gold	30,000^{^}
Switzerland (IFPI Switzerland)	Gold	20,000^{^}
Thailand	—	50,000
United Kingdom (BPI)	Platinum	540,000
United States (RIAA)	3× Platinum	3,000,000^{‡}
Summaries
Europe (IFPI)	Platinum	1,000,000^{*}
^{*} Sales figures based on certification alone.^{^} Shipments figures based on certification alone.^{‡} Sales+streaming figures based on certification alone.

== Release history ==
Release dates and formats
Region	Date	Format(s)	Label(s)	Ref.
Japan	November 15, 2003	CD	BMG	
Australia	November 17, 2003	CD	BMG	
Germany	November 17, 2003	CD	BMG	
Spain	November 17, 2003	CD	BMG	
United Kingdom	November 17, 2003	CD	Jive	
Canada	November 18, 2003	CD	BMG	
United States	November 18, 2003	Cassette; CD	Jive	
United States	April 20, 2004	DVD-Audio	Jive	
Canada	April 26, 2005	DualDisc	Sony BMG	
United States	April 26, 2005	DualDisc	Jive	
Germany	August 29, 2005	DualDisc	Sony BMG	
United Kingdom	September 26, 2005	DualDisc	Jive	
Italy	October 14, 2005	DualDisc	Sony BMG	
United States	August 9, 2019	Vinyl (Urban Outfitters exclusive) (Note: Two additional variants of the vinyl were subsequently made available exclusively via Urban Outfitters, in October 2019 and September 2020, respectively. Furthermore, In the Zone was reissued on cassette, exclusively at the retailer, in September 2020.)	Legacy	
United States	March 31, 2023	Vinyl	Legacy	
Australia	April 28, 2023	Vinyl	Sony Music	
Europe	April 28, 2023	Vinyl	Sony Music	

== See also ==
- Britney Spears: In the Zone
- Britney Spears discography
- List of Billboard 200 number-one albums of 2003
- List of number-one hits of 2003 (France)
