= Krazy (BlackGirl song) =

Single by BlackGirl

from the album Treat U Right
- Released: February 21, 1994
- Recorded: 1993–1994
- Genre: R&B; new jack swing
- Length: 4:19
- Label: RCA Records
- Songwriter: Derek "DOA" Allen
- Producer: Derek "DOA" Allen

BlackGirl singles chronology
"Krazy" (1994)	"90's Girl" (1994)

Music video
- "Krazy" on YouTube

"Krazy" is the title of a 1994 top forty R&B and dance single by BlackGirl. It is also their first single. Larry Flick of Billboard referred to it as "engaging and chock full of pleasant harmonizing". A music video spent various weeks in the top-twenty of the BET network.

== Track listing ==
- Krazy (Remixes) [CD Single]

1.) "Krazy" (Boss' Groove Mix w/ Rap) [4:19]
2.) "Krazy" (Krazy Original Radio Edit) [3:50]
3.) "Krazy" (Boss's Hip-Hop Mix) [4:15]
4.) "Krazy" (Krazy Party Mix) [4:12]
5.) "Krazy" (Boss' Groove Mix w/o Rap) [4:19]

== Charts ==
Chart (1994)	Peak position
US Billboard Hot 100	91
US Hot R&B/Hip-Hop Songs (Billboard)	37
US Top 40 (Billboard)	40
