= I Luv Your Girl =

Single by The-Dream featuring Young Jeezy

from the album Love/Hate
- Released: April 15, 2008
- Recorded: 2007
- Genre: R&B, hip-hop
- Length: 4:28
- Label: Radio Killa/Def Jam
- Songwriter: Terius Nash
- Producer: Christopher "Tricky" Stewart

The-Dream singles chronology
"Falsetto" (2007)	"I Luv Your Girl" (2008)	"Please Excuse My Hands" (2008)

"I Luv Your Girl" is the third and final single from The-Dream's debut studio album, Love/Hate. The track is produced by The-Dream's production partner, Christopher "Tricky" Stewart. The promotional and music video version contain a guest appearance from Def Jam labelmate Young Jeezy, while the album version is solo.

The song was interpolated by T-Pain for his guest verse on "Blame It" by Jamie Foxx, released the following year.

== Music video ==
The two music videos were directed by Fat Cats and premiered April 28, 2008 on MTV Jams. It features Young Jeezy rapping the first verse and has cameos from Chingy, Ne-Yo, Jazze Pha and Jermaine Dupri. The video also features New York Giants defensive end Osi Umenyiora. There are two versions of the music video. The first was an edited version, the directors cut, while the second, more explicit version featured The-Dream mouthing the explicit chorus and back-up dancers making explicit hand gestures toward the camera.

== Remixes ==
The official remix features Young Jeezy and was used for the video. An additional unofficial remix titled "I Fucked Your Girl" was released by G-Unit and featured former member Young Buck. The remix was made to diss Fat Joe. In this version, everyone except Lloyd Banks and Young Buck use the auto-tune effect. Other unofficial remixes followed from Fabolous and Jagged Edge. T-Pain sings an interpolation of the song on Jamie Foxx's hit "Blame It" on Foxx's Intuition (2008).

== Chart position ==
=== Weekly charts ===
Chart (2008)	Peak position
U.S. Billboard Hot 100	20
U.S. Billboard Hot R&B/Hip-Hop Songs	3
U.S. Billboard Rhythmic Airplay	1
U.S. Billboard Mainstream Top 40	39
U.S. Billboard Pop 100	58

=== Year-end charts ===
Chart (2008)	Position
US Billboard Hot 100	75
US Hot R&B/Hip-Hop Songs (Billboard)	18
US Rhythmic (Billboard)	13

== Release history ==
Release dates and formats for "I Luv Your Girl"
Region	Date	Format	Label(s)	Ref.
United States	June 17, 2008	Mainstream airplay	Def Jam	
