= Falsetto (song) =

Single by The-Dream

from the album Love/Hate
- Released: September 28, 2007
- Recorded: 2007
- Genre: R&B
- Length: 4:31 (Album Version); 4:06 (Radio/Video Edit)
- Label: Radio Killa/Def Jam
- Songwriters: Terius Nash and Christopher Stewart
- Producer: Christopher "Tricky" Stewart

The-Dream singles chronology
"Shawty Is a 10" (2007)	"Falsetto" (2007)	"I Luv Your Girl" (2008)

"Falsetto" is the second single from The-Dream's debut studio album, Love/Hate. The song is produced by Christopher "Tricky" Stewart and was released on September 28, 2007.

== Music video ==
The music video, most of which was filmed in Las Vegas, Nevada, premiered November 28, 2007 on MTV's TRL, followed by BET's 106 & Park on December 5, 2007.

== Charts ==
=== Weekly charts ===
Chart (2008)	Peak position
New Zealand (Recorded Music NZ)	38
US Billboard Hot 100	30
US Hot R&B/Hip-Hop Songs (Billboard)	3
US Rhythmic Airplay (Billboard)	17

=== Year-end charts ===
Chart (2008)	Position
US Hot R&B/Hip-Hop Songs (Billboard)	25
