= 90's Girl =

Single by BlackGirl

from the album Treat U Right
- Released: July 24, 1994
- Recorded: 1993–1994
- Genre: R&B; new jack swing; dance; soul
- Length: 5:17
- Label: RCA Records
- Songwriters: A. Foote; A. Dickey; C. Warren; D. Williams; G. Fields; J. Russell; M. McCann; Menton Smith; J.S. Harris III; T.S. Lewis
- Producers: Teddy Riley; Walter "Mucho" Scott; Chris Smith; Christian Warren

BlackGirl singles chronology
"Krazy" (1993)	"90's Girl" (1994)	"Where Did We Go Wrong" (1994)

"90's Girl" is a song by American vocal group BlackGirl, released on July 24, 1994 and the second single of the group's album Treat U Right. It reached #71 on the US Billboard Hot 100 and #23 on the UK Singles Chart.

== Track listing ==
Maxi-Promo CD Single

1. 90's Girl (Encore Alt. Remix) [Radio Edit]
2. 90's Girl (Encore Extended Alt. Remix)
3. 90's Girl (Encore Remix w/o Rap)
4. 90's Girl (Video Edit)
5. 90's Girl (Encore Instrumental)
6. 90's Girl (Encore A Capella)
7. 90's Girl (Original Album Version) [Radio Edit]

== Chart information ==
Chart	Peak position
US Billboard Hot 100	71
US Billboard Hot R&B Singles	13
UK Singles Chart	23
UK Dance Chart	6
UK R&B Singles Chart	5
