= Treat U Right =

Studio album by BlackGirl
- Released: May 10, 1994
- Recorded: 1993–1994
- Studios: Music Grinder Studios, Hollywood; Backroom Studio, Glendale
- Genres: Soul, R&B
- Length: 59:53
- Label: RCA
- Producers: Tricky Stewart & Sean Hall; Teddy Riley; Derek Allen; Arnold Hennings; Christian

BlackGirl chronology
Treat U Right (1994)	The Evolution of Blackgirl (1996)

Singles from Treat U Right
- 1. "Krazy" Released: February 21, 1994; 2. "90's Girl" Released: July 24, 1994; 3. "Where Did We Go Wrong" Released: September 12, 1994

Professional ratings
Review scores
Source	Rating
AllMusic	link

Treat U Right is the only studio album by American pop group BlackGirl, released on May 10, 1994, by RCA Records. It includes the singles "Krazy", "90's Girl", "Where Did We Go Wrong" and a cover of the Staple Singers' "Let's Do It Again".

== Track listing ==
No.	Title	Writer(s)	Length
1.	"Krazy"	Derek Allen; Mike Dailey	4:35
2.	"Treat U Right"	Derek Allen; Andrea Panell; Nycolia Turman; Pamela Copeland	5:00
3.	"Can U Feel It"	Christopher Stewart; Sean Hall; Nick Debenedetto	5:00
4.	"Where Did We Go Wrong"	Allen	4:47
5.	"Chains"	Arnold Hennings; Turman	4:50
6.	"Ooh Yeah (Smooth)"	Stewart; Hall; Debenedetto; Mark E. Stewart; Kevin Davis	4:36
7.	"90's Girl"	Antone Foote; Christian Warren; Gregory Fields; Jeffrey Russell; Meashell McCann	5:17
8.	"Nubian Prince"	Foote; Warren; Fields; Russell; McCann	4:59
9.	"Things We Used to Do"	Allen	4:43
10.	"Can't Live Without U"	Stewart; Hall; Debenedetto; Turman	4:39
11.	"Let's Do It Again"	Curtis Mayfield	4:54
12.	"Home"	Allen	1:43
13.	"90's Girl (Encore Remix)"	Foote; Warren; Fields; Russell; McCann	4:50
Total length:			59:53

== Personnel ==
- Pam Copeland – vocals, background vocals
- Nycolia "Tye-V" Turman – vocals, background vocals
- Rochelle Stuart – vocals, background vocals
- Teddy Riley, Menton Smith, Antwone Dickey, David Roland Williams, Walter Scott, Chris Smith – remix on track 13

== Charts ==
Album - Billboard (North America)

Year	Chart	Position
1997	Top Heatseekers	1
1997	The Billboard 200	46
