= Love/Hate (The-Dream album) =

Studio album by The-Dream
- Released: December 11, 2007
- Studios: Larrabee North (Universal City); Legacy (New York); Studio at the Palms (Las Vegas); Triangle Sound (Atlanta); Westlake Audio (Los Angeles)
- Genres: R&B; pop; soul; hip hop
- Length: 53:09
- Labels: Radio Killa; Def Jam
- Producers: Carlos McKinney; The-Dream; Tricky Stewart

The-Dream chronology
Love/Hate (2007)	Love vs. Money (2009)

Singles from Love/Hate
- 1. "Shawty Is a 10" Released: July 10, 2007; 2. "Falsetto" Released: September 28, 2007; 3. "I Luv Your Girl" Released: April 15, 2008

Love/Hate (rendered as Love Me All Summer, Hate Me All Winter on the front cover) is the debut studio album by American singer-songwriter The-Dream. It was released on December 11, 2007, by Def Jam Recordings and Radio Killa Records (The-Dream's imprint label through Def Jam) during his emergence as a prominent songwriter-producer in R&B and pop music.

The-Dream pursued an electronic, avant-garde, and hook-oriented direction of soul on Love/Hate, drawing inspiration from the 1980s musical works of Prince and Michael Jackson as well as the rap forms of his native Atlanta. Recorded with fellow songwriter-producers Tricky Stewart and Carlos McKinney, the album employs synthesizer, keyboard, and percussion sounds on eccentrically arranged tracks sequenced in a suite-like manner. It also features guest appearances from rapper Fabolous and singer Rihanna, whose 2007 hit single "Umbrella" had been written by The-Dream and served as another template for the album. Themed mostly in sex, his quirky lyrics are falsetto-sung and half-rapped from the perspective of a lecherous romantic with self-awareness and moral sense.

Love/Hate was promoted with the release of three singles – "Shawty Is a 10", "Falsetto", and "I Luv Your Girl" – which became top 40 hits on the Billboard Hot 100. The album itself charted at number 30 on the Billboard 200, selling 59,000 copies in its first week in the US. It eventually reached 552,000 copies sold and was certified Gold by the Recording Industry Association of America (RIAA), proving a minor success with mainstream audiences. Acclaimed on release, Love/Hate is regarded by critics as an influential and definitive R&B album from its era as well as a guilty pleasure for its qualities of silliness and catchiness.

== Background ==
Born Terius Nash in 1977, The-Dream grew up in Atlanta and learned to play musical instruments in elementary school before advancing to writing lyrics during high school. Several years later, he met songwriter-producer Laney Stewart who helped procure him a publishing contract, leading to successful songwriting efforts like Britney Spears' "Me Against the Music" (2003), among the many songs The-Dream would compose with Stewart's brother, fellow songwriter-producer Christopher "Tricky" Stewart. Alongside Tricky Stewart and mutual creative partner Carlos "Los Da Mystro" McKinney, The-Dream emerged as a songwriter-producer during the decade and helped popularize an electronic pop-R&B sound that followed a tradition pioneered by Prince, Kashif, Jimmy Jam and Terry Lewis, Teddy Riley, Timbaland and Missy Elliott, and the Neptunes.

In 2007, The-Dream and Stewart achieved a commercial breakthrough by writing Rihanna's "Umbrella", which topped record charts in the US and abroad, becoming one of the era's most popular hit singles. Its success attracted songwriting offers from several record labels, including Rihanna's home-label Def Jam Recordings. While initially hesitant to sign The-Dream as a solo recording act, the label conceded after seeing his and McKinney's composition "Bed" (2007) become a hit single for Capitol Records singer J. Holiday. The-Dream told Island Def Jam executive Karen Kwak about his intentions as a recording artist, particularly the style of singing he would pursue to be successful. "I sent her the record 'Bed' and she was like, 'Crazy!'", he recalls.

== Writing and recording ==
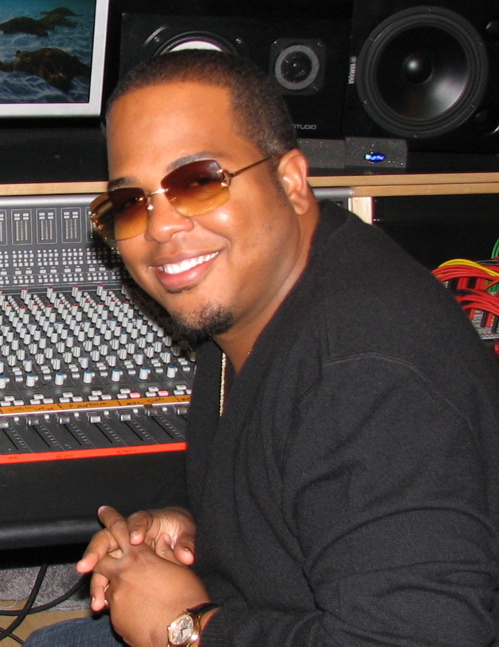
Tricky Stewart (shown in 2009) co-wrote and co-produced much of the music.

The-Dream told SOHH in August 2007 that writing and recording for Love/Hate took a total of nine days, with twelve tracks from the recording sessions making the final cut. He conceived Love/Hate with an auteuristic approach, directing the album's sessions with Stewart and McKinney each contributing production for certain tracks. The sessions were credited as taking place at Larrabee North in Universal City, Legacy Studios in New York, Studio at the Palms in Las Vegas, Triangle Sound Studios in Atlanta, and Westlake Audio in Los Angeles.

The-Dream wrote much of the album based on his relationship with singer and then-wife Nivea. (Note: Nivea confirmed in December 2007 that she and The-Dream were divorcing after rumors of a potential divorce reportedly circulated shortly prior.) He credited her with inspiring more sincerity in his songwriting, "to open up that other side of it that connects with the everyday woman", as he told SOHH. "She has helped me a lot with that area." Through his ambitions for the album, The-Dream wanted to provoke higher artistic standards in the music industry, telling SOHH:

Music is uninspiring right now. The bar needs to be raised; a creative standard should be set in music. I'm hoping that the real quality in these songs shines through, and leaves a sounding impact on the listeners... It's more of what I'm giving other people. It's like the '80s; it's musical. I'm doing the 'Umbrella' routine to this whole album. All of my records are singles. The album is really visual as well. It appeals to all your senses, similar to Thriller ... very 80's, very Prince, sensual, sexy stuff... Artists are gonna have to do some homework to find out who they are.

== Music and lyrics ==
On Love/Hate, The-Dream employs an ultramodern and hook-laden approach to contemporary soul with influences from past artists such as Prince, Michael Jackson, and R. Kelly. Tracks on the album are sequenced in the manner of a suite with recurring musical elements; the layered production throughout features spacious beats, oscillating keyboards, throbbing synthesizers, and baroque elements such as synthesized strings and harpsichord sounds. Simon Vozick-Levinson of Entertainment Weekly characterizes The-Dream's electronic arrangements as "unorthodox", while Slant Magazine's Wilson McBee finds him influenced by "Timbaland's space jams and Prince's gleeful synth lines". In another analysis, AllMusic's Andy Kellman dubs Love/Hate "a post-Timbaland/post-Neptunes pop album" and "state-of-the art pop circa 2007–2008 [...] resolutely luminescent", with "rubbery" rhythms "sometimes colored by those swishing, panning effects heard in 'Bed' and its many imitators". Kelefa Sanneh of The New York Times notes a "gooey, robotic '80s-influenced R&B" and writes that the album embodies "the ecstatic sound of pop radio in 2007". According to Memphis Flyer journalist Chris Herrington, The-Dream blurs "any distinctions between mainstream and avant-garde" within the context of "black pop".

Lyrically, the songs are composed from the perspective of a lecherous romantic, with attitudes alternately boastful and vulnerable. Drew Hinshaw of PopMatters observes that The-Dream "engages in the same brand of improvident hedonism" as his contemporaries – "snatching [women] from their long-term relationships, cheating indiscriminately, brandishing dollars and the things they buy". However, the singer also demonstrates moral sense, according to Hinshaw, who says "his nagging conscience and his ear for tragedy" come to the forefront of the songs. USA Today's Steve Jones observes a degree of subtlety in The-Dream's sexual suggestions. Vocally, his phrasing is characterized by extended syllables, falsetto frequencies, semi-rapped melodies, and sung refrains of "ella" and "eh" in the manner of "Umbrella". The-Dream repurposed the "Umbrella" refrains throughout the album to serve as a signature of "notoriety" for listeners to associate with him. (Note: The-Dream elaborated further to Jet in 2008, saying, "I tried to draw those lines from each record, to each other so that everybody else knows 'he did this record.' It took people a long time; even now, when I say I wrote this record and that record, they think that either J. Holiday is copying off Rihanna or I'm copying off J. Holiday and Rihanna. Then it takes them a while to say, 'Oh no, he wrote all those records.'") Sean Fennessey of Vibe characterizes his songwriting as "quirky" and adds that he channels "Prince at his vampy peak, and Bobby Brown, who always led with an assured growl". In summarizing The-Dream's lyrical persona on the album, Robert Christgau muses:

True, he pursues other's girls, leaves one shawty because she's not quick enough on the get-down, and moves on to the speedier, needier Nikki when another doesn't immediately accept his tender offer. But mostly he just enjoys himself in bed and makes pop in the studio. In 'Luv Songs,' he does both simultaneously.

== Marketing and sales ==
Logo of Def Jam, the album's record label

Around the time of "Bed"'s release, The-Dream debuted on Def Jam with the single release of "Shawty Is da Shit" (also censored as "Shawty Is a 10"). "Falsetto" was released soon after as his next single, followed by "I Luv Your Girl", the last of Love/Hate's singles. All three charted in the top 10 of Billboard magazine's Hot R&B/Hip-Hop Songs and the top 40 of the Hot 100 (with "Shawty Is a 10" at number 17, "Falsetto" at number 30, and "I Luv Your Girl" at number 20). In September 2007, Billboard reported that the album was scheduled for a December 11 release through Island Def Jam, although it would actually be released on Def Jam and Radio Killa Records (an imprint label created by The-Dream through the record company).

In the August 2007 interview for SOHH, The-Dream revealed the title Love/Hate as an abbreviation for "love me all summer, hate me all winter", explaining that "because they love you when you hot and when you're cold they don't ... I'm hot right now and they love me, but I was cold and they wasn't fuckin' with me." The album cover was revealed to Rap-Up on November 14, featuring the full title. Years later, The-Dream elaborated further on the title, saying it had been based on the "in's and out's of life", positive and negative qualities in people, and "how everything [relates] to a carnival."

Love/Hate debuted at number 30 on the Billboard 200 and sold 59,000 copies in its first week – the week ending December 17, 2007. It also reached number five on the Top R&B/Hip-Hop Albums. In 2008, The-Dream supported the album further as an opening act on Mary J. Blige and Jay-Z's Heart of the City Tour, although his performances were overlooked in the press. Meanwhile, Love/Hate's hit singles remained popular through the year, including abroad, with "Shawty Is a 10" and "Falsetto" charting in New Zealand at number 36 and 38, respectively. On July 24, the album was certified Gold by the Recording Industry Association of America (RIAA), denoting 500,000 units recorded in the US. By May 2009, it had sold 552,000 copies, according to Nielsen Soundscan.

== Critical reception ==
Love/Hate ratings
Review scores
Source	Rating
AllMusic	5/5 stars
Entertainment Weekly	A−
MSN Music (Consumer Guide)	A−
The New Zealand Herald	4/5
Pitchfork	9.1/10
PopMatters	8/10
Rolling Stone	3.5/5 stars
Slant Magazine	3/5 stars
Sputnikmusic	4/5
USA Today	3/4 stars

Love/Hate was met with critical acclaim. Reviewing for AllMusic, Kellman applauded its "unified sound" as one "unlike most modern R&B albums", before adding that neither Timbaland nor the Neptunes have "put together something as consistent or tautly constructed, simultaneously single-oriented and album-oriented, as this". Fennessey, writing in Vibe, believed the album "never breaks stride, balancing pace with power", while Rolling Stone magazine's Christian Hoard called it "one of the most likeable R&B records of the year" because of The-Dream's instinct for composing melodies. Drew Hinshaw from PopMatters found his lyrics empathic and credited him for possessing "something few hitmakers can claim: a wide-angle lens". Christgau, in his review for MSN Music, called Love/Hate "an utterly slight, utterly captivating R&B album" constructed from The-Dream's "extended-syllable trick, dollops of falsetto, male backups going hey and stuff, and the good nature of someone who figures there's no point being mean when you're lucky".

Some reviewers had reservations. McBee wrote in Slant Magazine that there are moments of "greatness and plenty of potential" along with "some riskless, by-the-book slow jams" from The-Dream, who nonetheless shows "a meticulous, consistent sonic arrangement". Rebecca Barry Hill of The New Zealand Herald considered the "Umbrella"-style vocal refrains and various references to sex partners a running gag throughout the album, while musing that The-Dream's "closest relationship is with his synthesizers", questioning to what degree the vocals of the album were electronically processed. However, she remained impressed by the quality and interest level of the production, praising "Falsetto" and "Ditch That..." in particular, before conceding that Love/Hate is a guilty pleasure.

== Legacy and influence ==
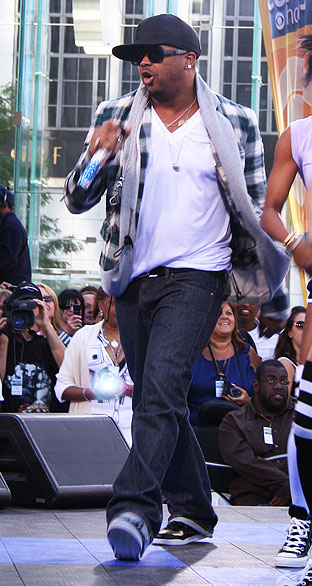
The-Dream onstage in New York, September 2008

The-Dream felt disappointed in Love/Hate's minor success with mainstream audiences, particularly its lack of nominations for the 51st Annual Grammy Awards in 2009. Writing in May that year, Christgau observed how the album had "yielded R&B hits [and] went Gold", but "failed to make him as ubiquitous as Akon", his contemporary in the genre. According to The New York Times reporter Melissa Maerz, The-Dream was "one of pop's most reliable hit makers" but "not yet a pop star", and had also been "criticized for an uncharismatic stage presence". Attributing this outcome to marketing, The-Dream pursued a greater crossover strategy with his second album Love vs. Money (2009), which was written during his divorce from Nivea and explored the depreciating effect of wealth on relationships through confessional and emotionally-charged narratives, alongside guest appearances by high-profile vocalists in Mariah Carey, Kanye West, and Lil Jon.

According to Kellman, Love/Hate was the first in The-Dream's series of "melodically rich and impeccably layered" hit-R&B albums that would include Love vs. Money and Love King (2010), constituting some of the genre's "most adventurous" albums during the early-21st century. After the release of Love vs. Money, Christgau opined in Blender that Love/Hate had been a "gloriously eccentric sex album" and possibly enough from the musician, while naming "Falsetto" an "'Umbrella' clone" that was the album's "signature moment". Concurrently, The-Dream achieved further success as a songwriter on some of the era's most successful pop singles, such as Carey's "Touch My Body" (2008), Beyoncé's "Single Ladies (Put a Ring on It)" (2008), and Justin Bieber's "Baby" (2010), along with frequent collaborations with rap artists, as on West's "All of the Lights" (2011) and the West–Jay-Z song "No Church in the Wild" (2012). Herrington reported around this time that The-Dream had risen to the forefront of the "songwriter/producer-as-auteur paradigm" in black music forged by Timbaland, the Neptunes, and West, while making R&B albums equaled only by contemporary neo soul acts such as Jill Scott, Erykah Badu, and Raphael Saadiq.

Love/Hate proved highly innovative in its fusion of traditional R&B and Atlanta-based rap forms and attitudes. Pitchfork journalist Meaghan Garvey says it was "a defining moment for the collision of rap and R&B, a pillar of technical songwriting and soulful expression" whose influence "bled into the fabric of popular R&B". In a 2012 review, Sputnikmusic staff writer Trebor proclaims Love/Hate "the best pop/R&B album of the 21st century" and distinct from other works in the genre for demonstrating a self-awareness amidst the silly narratives and profusion of catchy sounds, leading him to also call it "the definition of a guilty pleasure". Reflecting on its 10th anniversary in 2017, Billboard's Da'Shan Smith points to the album as "the chapter closer for a landmark year, which saw hip-hop and R&B formulating into the sound and culture that we know it as today".

== Track listing ==
All lyrics are written by Terius "The-Dream" Nash, except track 1 (Nash and John Jackson).

Love/Hate track listing
No.	Title	Music	Producer(s)	Length
1.	"Shawty Is da Shit" (featuring Fabolous)	Terius "The-Dream" Nash; Carlos "L.O.S." McKinney	Nash; McKinney	4:22
2.	"I Luv Your Girl"	Nash; Christopher "Tricky" Stewart	Nash; Stewart	4:27
3.	"Fast Car"	Nash; McKinney	Nash; McKinney	4:50
4.	"Nikki"	Nash; Stewart	Nash; Stewart	4:05
5.	"She Needs My Love"	Nash; Stewart	Nash; Stewart	4:29
6.	"Falsetto"	Nash; Stewart	Nash; Stewart	4:31
7.	"Playin' in Her Hair"	Nash; McKinney	Nash; McKinney	3:14
8.	"Purple Kisses"	Nash; McKinney	Nash; McKinney	5:13
9.	"Ditch That..."	Nash; Stewart	Nash; Stewart	5:00
10.	"Luv Songs"	Nash; McKinney	Nash; McKinney	4:42
11.	"Livin' a Lie" (featuring Rihanna)	Nash; Stewart	Nash; Stewart	4:16
12.	"Mama"	Nash; Stewart	Nash; Stewart	4:01

== Personnel ==
Information is taken from the album credits.

- Chris Athens – mastering
- Dianella Barahona – backing vocals (track 7)
- Fabolous – vocals (track 1)
- Mark "Exit" Goodchild – additional recording (track 9), editing (tracks 4–10, 12)
- Mark Gray – assisted recording (tracks 3, 8)
- Jayson Joshua – mixing (tracks 2–12)
- Ray Kay – photography
- Silena King-Murrell – backing vocals (track 1)
- Manny Marroquin – mixing (track 1)
- Carlos "L.O.S." McKinney – additional keyboards (track 5), music composition (tracks 1, 3, 7, 8, 10), production (1, 3, 7, 8, 10), writing (1, 3, 7, 8, 10)
- Julio Miranda – acoustic guitar (track 6), guitar (3, 10), solos (6)
- Sameen Naqvi – backing vocals (track 7)
- Terius "The-Dream" Nash – album direction, art direction, design, lyrics, melodic composition, production, styling, vocal arrangement, vocal production, vocals, writing
- Scott Naughton – recording (tracks 1, 3, 7, 8, 10)
- Alec Newell – recording (tracks 5, 6)
- Chris "Tek" O'Ryan – recording (tracks 2–12)
- Dave Pensado – mixing (tracks 2–12)
- Justin Pintar – assisted mixing (tracks 2–12)
- Antonio "LA" Reid – executive production
- Omar Reyna – additional recording (track 9)
- Rihanna – vocals (track 11)
- JP Robinson – art direction, design
- Sarah Rodriguez – backing and spoken vocals (track 9)
- Angie Romasanta – backing vocals (tracks 7, 8)
- Christopher "Tricky" Stewart – album direction, music composition (tracks 2, 4–6, 9, 11, 12), production (2, 4–6, 9, 11, 12), writing (2, 4–6, 9, 11, 12)
- Brian "B Luv" Thomas – engineering (track 11)
- Alex Venquer – vocal recording (track 1: Fabolous)
- Veronica Whitehead – backing vocals (track 7)
- Andrew Wuepper – assisted mixing (track 2–12)

== Charts ==
=== Weekly charts ===
Chart performance for Love/Hate
Chart (2007)	Peak position
US Billboard 200	30
US Top R&B/Hip-Hop Albums (Billboard)	5

=== Year-end charts ===
2008 year-end chart performance for Love/Hate
Chart (2008)	Position
US Billboard 200	84
US Top R&B/Hip-Hop Albums (Billboard)	14

== Certifications ==
Certifications for Love/Hate
Region	Certification	Certified units/sales
United States (RIAA)	Gold	500,000^{^}
^{^} Shipments figures based on certification alone.

== See also ==
- Album era – 1960s–2000s period in the music industry
- Progressive soul – Music genre
- Song cycle – Group of songs designed to be performed in sequence as a single entity
