= Shawty Is a 10 =

Single by The-Dream featuring Fabolous

from the album Love/Hate
- Released: July 10, 2007
- Recorded: 2007
- Genre: Hip hop, R&B
- Length: 4:22 (Album Version ft. Fabolous); 4:03 (Single Version ft. Fabolous); 3:50 (Original No Rap Edit)
- Label: Radio Killa/Def Jam
- Songwriter: Terius Nash
- Producers: Los Da Mystro, The-Dream

The-Dream singles chronology
"Shawty Is a 10" (2007)	"Falsetto" (2007)

Fabolous singles chronology
"Baby Don't Go" (2007)	"Shawty Is a 10" (2007)	"Top of the Game (Remix)" (2007)

Alternate cover
- Cover for the uncensored version, "Shawty Is Da Shit".

"Shawty Is a 10" (also known uncensored as "Shawty Is da Shit") is the debut single by American singer The-Dream, released on July 23, 2007 by Def Jam Recordings as the lead single for his debut studio album, Love/Hate (2007). Def Jam signed The-Dream following the success of "Umbrella", a hit song he co-wrote for Rihanna. The track contains a guest verse from labelmate Fabolous, while songwriting and production handled by The-Dream alongside longtime collaborator Carlos McKinney.

== Remixes ==
The song has three remixes. The first, featuring Fabolous, was only intended to be used in the video; however, it was chosen for the album version as well. The second remix, featuring R. Kelly and a new verse by The-Dream, was released on July 10, 2007; this version was released as the official remix. The third "extended remix" features Aaliyah, Kid Cudi, Keri Hilson and Aasim.

Swedish pop duo jj included a cover version of the song on their 2012 EP High Summer, titled "10".

== Music video ==
The video premiered on BET's 106 & Park on September 10, 2007. Cameo appearances include Jazze Pha, Mariah Carey, Keri Hilson, DJ Khaled and Yung Joc.

== Charts ==
=== Weekly charts ===
Chart (2007–2008)	Peak position
New Zealand (Recorded Music NZ)	36
US Billboard Hot 100	17
US Pop 100 (Billboard)	45
US Hot R&B/Hip-Hop Songs (Billboard)	6
US Rhythmic Airplay (Billboard)	8

=== Year-end charts ===
Chart (2007)	Position
US Hot R&B/Hip-Hop Songs (Billboard)	61
Chart (2008)	Position
US Hot R&B/Hip-Hop Songs (Billboard)	72

== Certifications ==
Region	Certification	Certified units/sales
United States (RIAA)	Gold	500,000^{^}
^{^} Shipments figures based on certification alone.
