= The-Dream discography =

- Studio albums: 7
- Extended plays: 4
- Singles: 11
- Music videos: 8
- Cover albums: 1
- Visual albums: 1

The discography of American singer-songwriter The-Dream consists of six studio albums, most of which on Def Jam Recordings. His career also includes a number of singles, guest appearances, and various writing/production credits. In the summer of 2015, it was announced that he had left Capitol Records leaving future releases on hold.

== Albums ==
=== Studio albums ===
List of albums, with selected chart positions
Title	Album details	Peak chart positions			Sales	Certifications
Title	Album details	US	US R&B /HH	US R&B	Sales	Certifications
Love/Hate	Released: December 11, 2007; Label: Radio Killa, Def Jam; Formats: CD, LP, digital download	30	5	—	US: 331,000	RIAA: Gold
Love vs. Money	Released: March 10, 2009; Label: Radio Killa, Def Jam; Formats: CD, LP, digital download	2	1	—		RIAA: Gold
Love King	Released: June 29, 2010; Label: Radio Killa, Def Jam; Formats: CD, digital download	4	3	—		
1977	Released: August 31, 2011; Label: Self-released; Formats: CD, digital download	—	29	—		
IV Play	Released: May 28, 2013; Label: Radio Killa, Def Jam; Formats: CD, digital download	16	2	2		
Ménage à Trois: Sextape Vol. 1, 2, 3	Released: December 21, 2018; Label: Radio Killa, Hitco; Format: Digital download	—	—	22		
Sextape Vol. 4	Released: April 17, 2020; Label: Radio Killa, Hitco; Format: Digital download	—	—	—		
Love/Hate II	Released: July 10, 2026; Label: Dreamboy, Republic; Format: Digital download	—	—	—		

=== Cover albums ===
List of albums, with selected information
Title	Album details
IAmSam	Released: December 22, 2015; Format: Streaming

=== Compilation albums ===
List of albums, with selected information
Title	Album details
The Love Trilogy	Released: June 29, 2010; Label: Def Jam; Format: CD, DVD, digital download
Radio Killer	Released: 2010; Label: Amalgam, Icon; Format: CD, digital download

=== Visual albums ===
List of visual albums
Title	Album details
Genesis	Released: January 8, 2016; Label: Radio Killa, Roc Nation; Format: Streaming

== EPs ==
List of EPs, with selected chart positions
Title	EP details
Climax	Released: June 2, 2013
Royalty: The Prequel (EP)	Released: July 7, 2014
Crown (EP)	Released: April 14, 2015
Love You to Death	Released: December 9, 2016

== Singles ==
=== As lead artist ===
List of singles as lead artist, with selected chart positions and certifications, showing year released and album name
Title	Year	Peak chart positions			Certifications	Album
Title	Year	US	US R&B	US Pop	Certifications	Album
"Shawty Is Da Shit" (featuring Fabolous)	2007	17	6	45	RIAA: Gold	Love/Hate
"Falsetto"	2007	30	3	94	RIAA: Gold	Love/Hate
"I Luv Your Girl" (featuring Young Jeezy)	2008	20	3	58		Love/Hate
"Rockin' That Shit"	2008	22	2	50		Love vs. Money
"My Love" (featuring Mariah Carey)	2009	82	36	—		Love vs. Money
"Walkin' on the Moon" (featuring Kanye West)	2009	87	38	74		Love vs. Money
"Sweat It Out"	2009	—	32	—		Love vs. Money
"Love King"	2010	92	26	—		Love King
"Make Up Bag" (featuring T.I.)	2010	103	33	—		Love King
"Roc"	2012	—	55	—		Climax EP
"Dope Bitch" (featuring Pusha T)	2012	125	33	—		Climax EP
"Slow It Down" (featuring Fabolous)	2013	—	24	—		IV Play
"IV Play"	2013	—	—	—		IV Play
"Black"	2014	—	—	—		Crown EP
"That's My Shit" (featuring T.I.)	2015	—	42	—		Crown EP
"Cedes Benz"	2015	—	—	—		Crown EP
"Summer Body" (featuring Fabolous)	2017	—	—	—		non-album single
"It's Yo Birthday"	2017	—	—	—		Ménage à Trois: Sextape Vol. 1, 2, 3
"Bring That Body"	2026	—	—	—		Love/Hate II
"Tampa" (with Usher)	2026	—	—	—		Love/Hate II
Be My Lady (featuring T.I.)	2026	—	—	—		Love/Hate II
"24/7"	2026	—	—	—		Love/Hate II
"—" denotes releases that did not chart

=== As featured artist ===
List of singles as featured artist, with selected chart positions, showing year released and album name
Title	Year	Peak chart positions		Album
Title	Year	US	US R&B	Album
"Please Excuse My Hands" (Plies featuring Jamie Foxx and The-Dream)	2008	66	8	Definition of Real
"Baby" (LL Cool J featuring The-Dream)	2008	52	22	Exit 13
"Fall Back" (Dear Jayne featuring The-Dream)	2008	—	118	Voice Message
"Cookie Jar" (Gym Class Heroes featuring The-Dream)	2008	59	—	The Quilt
"All I Need" (Sterling Simms featuring Jadakiss and The-Dream)	2008	123	—	Yours, Mine & The Truth
"All I Really Want" (Rick Ross featuring The-Dream)	2009	—	—	Deeper Than Rap
"Throw It In the Bag" (Fabolous featuring The-Dream)	2009	14	4	Loso's Way
"Digital Girl" (Remix) (Jamie Foxx featuring Kanye West, The-Dream and Drake)	2009	92	38	Intuition
"Gangsta Luv" (Snoop Dogg featuring The-Dream)	2009	35	24	Malice n Wonderland
"No Mercy" (T.I. featuring The-Dream)	2010	123	—	No Mercy
"Atlanta, GA" (Shawty Lo featuring The-Dream, Ludacris and Gucci Mane)	2010	—	—	Fright Night
"Big Boy Dialogue" (Jadakiss featuring The-Dream)	2013	—	—	non-album singles
"M.F.T.R." (Pusha T featuring The-Dream)	2015	—	—	King Push – Darkest Before Dawn: The Prelude
"F U Pay Me" (Jermaine Dupri and Da Brat featuring The-Dream)	2016	—	—	non-album singles
"D4L" (Sevyn Streeter featuring The-Dream)	2016	—	—	non-album singles
"Love U Better" (Ty Dolla $ign featuring Lil Wayne and The-Dream)	2017	—	—	Beach House 3
"Bedroom Calling" (Chromeo featuring The-Dream)	2018	—	—	Head Over Heels
"Little Havana" (Rick Ross featuring Willie Falcon and The-Dream)	2021	—	—	Richer Than I Ever Been
"—" denotes a recording that did not chart or was not released in that territory.

=== Promotional singles ===
List of promotional singles, with selected chart positions, showing year released and album name
Title	Year	Peak chart positions		Album
Title	Year	US	US R&B	Album
"Let Me See the Booty" (featuring Lil Jon)	2009	—	111	Love vs. Money
"Turnt Out"	2010	—	—	Love King
"Body Work"/"Fuck My Brains Out"	2011	—	—	non-album singles
"Kill the Lights" (featuring Casha)	2012	—	—	non-album singles
"—" denotes a recording that did not chart.

== Other charted songs ==
List of songs, with selected chart positions, showing year released and album name
Title	Year	Peak chart positions		Album
Title	Year	US	US R&B	Album
"Shut It Down" (Drake featuring The-Dream)	2010	125	71	Thank Me Later
"Luv Ya Gyal // Love Sounds" (Tory Lanez featuring The-Dream)	2019	125	—	Chixtape 5
"Manslaughter" (Pop Smoke featuring The-Dream and Rick Ross)	2021	82	33	Faith
"—" denotes a recording that did not chart.

== Guest appearances ==
List of non-single guest appearances, with other performing artists, showing year released and album name
Title	Year	Other artist(s)	Album
"I Can't Mess With You"	2005	Nivea	Complicated
"Okay" (Red Cup Remix)	2005	Nivea	Complicated
"Trapstar"	2006	Nivea	Animalistic
"Once I'm Gone"	2006	Nivea	Animalistic
"Ohh La La"	2006	Nivea	Animalistic
"I Need Your Lovin'"	2007	Taurus	Taurus
"Bartender" (Remix)	2007	T-Pain, Chingy, Trae Tha Truth	none
""Hatin' on the Club"	2007	Rihanna	none
"Touch My Body" (Remix)	2008	Mariah Carey, Rick Ross	none
"Champion"	2008	Attitude	Key 2 Da Streets Vol. 2 My State of Mind
"Who Let Them In"	2008	Phyzikal, Jazze Pha	none
"You Know I"	2008	Young Chris	none
"Gimme Some"	2008	Kardinal Offishall	Not 4 Sale
"Kissin' Ears"	2008	Gym Class Heroes	The Quilt
"Boom In It"	2009	Mario	none
"Tipsy"	2009	Tayma Loren	none
"Pay Me"	2009	Young Trimm	Evolution of the Machine
"Rent Money"	2009	Young Trimm	Evolution of the Machine
"Keep On Lovin' Me"	2009	Cassie	none
"Lovers Thing"	2009	Ciara	Fantasy Ride
"Tipper Love"	2009	DJ Drama, La the Darkman, Too $hort	Gangsta Grillz: The Album (Vol. 2)
"Drink In My Cup"	2009	Electrik Red	How to Be a Lady: Volume 1
"Like I Do"	2009	T.I.	none
"Gangsta Luv"	2009	Snoop Dogg	Malice n Wonderland
"Luv Drunk"	2009	Snoop Dogg	Malice n Wonderland
"Mine"	2009	Ace Hood	Ruthless
"All I Really Want"	2009	Rick Ross	Deeper Than Rap
"All I Really Want" (Remix)	2009	Rick Ross, Twista, Krayzie Bone	none
"Download" (Remix)	2009	Lil Kim, Soulja Boy, T-Pain, Charlie Wilson	none
"T-Shirt" (Radio Killa Remix)	2010	Shontelle	none
"Shiny Suit Theory"	2010	Jay Electronica, Jay-Z	A Written Testimony
"Atlanta GA"	2010	Shawty Lo, Ludacris, Gucci Mane	I'm Da Man 3
"Shut It Down"	2010	Drake	Thank Me Later
"I'm Up In The Bank"	2010	Ciara	none
"Live This Life"	2011	Big Sean	Finally Famous
"Higher"	2012	Pusha T, Mase, Cocaine 80's	Cruel Summer
"Exodus 23:1"	2012	Pusha T	none
"Extremely Blessed"	2012	2 Chainz	Based on a T.R.U. Story
"Sky Walker"	2013	Kelly Rowland	Talk a Good Game
"40 Acres"	2013	Pusha T	My Name Is My Name
"Let Your Heart Go (Break My Soul)"	2014	T.I.	Paperwork
"She Knows" (Remix)	2015	Ne-Yo, Trey Songz, T-Pain	none
"Goat"	2015	2 Chainz	Trapavelli Tre
"Money Dance"	2015	Rick Ross	Black Dollar/Black Market
"M.F.T.R."	2015	Pusha T	King Push – Darkest Before Dawn: The Prelude
"M.P.A."	2015	Pusha T, Kanye West, ASAP Rocky	King Push – Darkest Before Dawn: The Prelude
"Ultralight Beam"	2016	Kanye West, Chance the Rapper, Kirk Franklin, Kelly Price	The Life of Pablo
"F.U.B.U."	2016	Solange, BJ the Chicago Kid	A Seat at the Table
"Good Morning"	2016	SBTRKT	Save Yourself
"Revert"	2016	SBTRKT	Save Yourself
"Bury You"	2016	SBTRKT	Save Yourself
"Present Situation"	2017	Sevyn Streeter	Girl Disrupted
"Everything"	2018	Nas, Kanye West	Nasir
"Only Dimes"	2018	Too $hort, G-Eazy	The Pimp Tape
"Shiny Suit Theory"	2020	Jay Electronica, Jay-Z	A Written Testimony
"Sights And Silencers"	2020	Lil Wayne	Funeral
"Manslaughter"	2021	Pop Smoke, Rick Ross	Faith
"Brought My Love"	2023	Diddy, Herb Alpert	The Love Album: Off the Grid
"Sky City"	2024	¥$, Kanye West, Ty Dolla $ign, 070 Shake, CyHi, Desiigner	Vultures 2
"All Things Considered"	2025	Clipse, Pusha T, Malice	Let God Sort Em Out

== Music videos ==
List of music videos
Title	Year	Director(s)
"Shawty Is a 10" (featuring Fabolous)	2007	none
"Falsetto"	2007	none
"I Luv Your Girl" (version 1) (featuring Young Jeezy)	2008	Fat Cats
"I Luv Your Girl" (version 2)	2008	Fat Cats
"Please Excuse My Hands" (Plies featuring Jamie Foxx and The-Dream)	2008	none
"Baby" (LL Cool J featuring The-Dream)	2008	Benny Boom
"Cookie Jar" (Gym Class Heroes featuring The-Dream)	2008	Rage
"Rockin' That Shit"	2008	Ray Kay
"My Love" (featuring Mariah Carey)	2009	Nick Cannon
"Walkin' on the Moon" (featuring Kanye West)	2009	Hype Williams
"Throw It in the Bag" (Fabolous featuring The-Dream)	2009	Erik White
"Digital Girl" (Remix) (Jamie Foxx featuring Kanye West, The-Dream and Drake)	2009	Hype Williams
"All I Really Want" (Rick Ross featuring The-Dream)	2009	Gil Green
"Gangsta Luv" (Snoop Dogg featuring The-Dream)	2009	Paul Hunter
"Love King"	2010	Lil' X
"Love King" (Remix) (featuring Ludacris)	2010	Clifton Bell
"Make Up Bag" (featuring T.I.)	2010	Lil' X
"Yamaha / Nikki Part 2 / Abyss"	2010	Motion Family
"Murderer"	2011	none
"Long Gone"	2011	Aristotle
"Ghetto" (featuring Big Sean)	2011	Motion Family
"Roc"	2012	Marc Klasfeld
"Kill The Lights" (featuring Casha)	2012	Colin Michael Quinn
"Dope Bitch" (featuring Pusha T)	2012	Lance Drake
"Wake Me When It's Over"	2012	none
"Used To Be" (featuring Casha)	2012	none
"Slow It Down" (featuring Fabolous)	2013	Motion Family
"IV Play"	2013	Director X
"Too Early" (featuring Gary Clark Jr.)	2013	Stephen Garnett and Damien Sandoval
"High Art" (featuring Jay-Z)	2013	Latin
"BLACK"	2014	Daniel Sannwald

== See also ==
- The-Dream production discography
