= The-Dream production discography =

The following list is a discography of production (songwriting and arrangement) and sole songwriting credits (excluding guest appearances, interpolations, and samples) by The-Dream.

== Production credits ==
- 3LW – "You Ain't Ready" (produced with Tricky Stewart)
- Beyoncé
  - "Single Ladies (Put a Ring on It)" (produced with Tricky Stewart)
  - "Smash Into You"
  - "1+1"
  - "Run the World (Girls)"
  - "End of Time"
  - "Yoncé" / "Partition" (produced with Timbaland, Jerome Harmon, Key Wane, Mike Dean and Boots)
  - "XO" (produced with Ryan Tedder and Hit-Boy)
  - "Flawless" (featuring Chimamanda Ngozi Adichie) (produced with Hit-Boy and Rey Reel Music)
  - "Break My Soul" (produced with Tricky Stewart)
  - "My House"
  - "Alligator Tears" (produced with Khirye Tyler)
  - "Levii's Jeans" (feat. Post Malone) (produced with Louis Bell)
  - "Ya Ya" (produced with Cadenza, Harry Edwards, and Khirye Tyler)
  - "Oh Louisiana"
  - "Riiverdance"
- Cassie
  - "Nobody But You"
  - "I'm a Lover" (produced with Tricky Stewart)
- Chlöe - "Looze U"
- Ciara
  - Fantasy Ride (2009)
    - "High Price" featuring Ludacris (produced with Tricky Stewart)
    - "Like a Surgeon" (produced with Tricky Stewart)
    - "Lover's Thing" featuring The-Dream (Co-produced)
    - "Keep Dancin' On Me" (produced with Tricky Stewart)
  - Basic Instinct (2010)
    - "Basic Instinct (U Got Me)" (produced with Tricky Stewart)
    - "Ride" featuring Ludacris (produced with Tricky Stewart)
    - "Girls Get Your Money" (produced with Tricky Stewart)
    - "Speechless" (produced with Tricky Stewart)
    - "You Can Get it" (produced with Tricky Stewart)
    - "Wants For Dinner" (produced with Tricky Stewart)
    - "I Run it" (produced with Tricky Stewart)
- Diddy – "Change"
- Donnie Klang – "Hurt That Body"
- Flo Rida – "Respirator" (produced with Los Da Mystro)
- Electrik Red – "So Good" (produced with Tricky Stewart)
- Jamie Drastik – "Ride Freestyle" (produced with Tricky Stewart)
- Jamie Foxx
  - (featuring T.I.) "Just Like Me" (produced with Tricky Stewart)
  - (featuring Kanye West & The-Dream) "Digital Girl" (produced with Tricky Stewart)
- Janet Jackson – "The Greatest X" (produced with Tricky Stewart)
- Jay-Z
  - (feat. Justin Timberlake) "Holy Grail" (produced with Timbaland, No ID and Jerome "J-Roc" Harmon)
- Justin Bieber – "Baby" (produced with Tricky Stewart)
- Keyshia Cole – "Finally"
- Lionel Richie – "Forever and a Day" (produced with Tricky Stewart)
- Mariah Carey
  - "Touch My Body" (produced with Tricky Stewart)
  - "Obsessed" (produced with Tricky Stewart)
  - "H.A.T.E.U." (produced with Tricky Stewart)
  - "They Don't Know Me" (Unreleased) (produced with Tricky Stewart
- Mary J. Blige
  - Stronger with Each Tear
  - "Kitchen (produced with Tricky Stewart)
- Mario – "Starlight"
- Nivea
  - "Intro: Rain"
  - "Complicated"
  - "Fulton County Correctional Call (Interlude)"
  - "Breathe (Let It Go)" (co-producer)
  - "Indian Dance"
  - "Okay (Red-Cup Version)"
  - "It's All Good"
- Rihanna
  - "Umbrella" (produced with Tricky Stewart)
  - "Whipping My Hair" (produced with Tricky Stewart)
  - "Hard" (produced with Tricky Stewart)
  - "Rockstar 101" (produced with Tricky Stewart)
  - "Birthday Cake" (produced with Da Internz)
  - "Do Ya Thang" (produced with Kuk Harell)
  - "Phresh Out the Runway" (produced with David Guetta and Giorgio Tuinfort)
  - "Nobody's Business" (featuring Chris Brown) (produced with Carlos McKinney)
  - "Love Without Tragedy / Mother Mary" (produced with Carlos McKinney)
- Rita Ora
  - "Hello, Hi, Goodbye"
- Taurus
  - "Learn the Hard Way"
- Tulisa
  - "Sight of You"
- The Cheetah Girls
  - Fuego
  - Homesick
  - Dance Me If You Can
  - Feels Like Love
- Kim Kardashian
  - "Jam (Turn It Up)"

== Writing credits ==
- 3LW – "You Ain't Ready"
- All Time Low - “Too Much”
- Ashanti – "Medicine"
- B2K – "Everything"
- Bayje
  - "Still in Love"
  - "Missin' You"
- Beyoncé
  - "Single Ladies (Put A Ring On It)"
  - "Smash Into You"
  - "1 + 1"
  - "Love on Top"
  - "Countdown"
  - "End of Time"
  - "Run the World (Girls)"
  - "Dance For You"
  - "Yoncé" / "Partition"
  - "XO"
  - "Flawless"
  - "6 Inch" (feat. the Weeknd)
  - "Savage Remix"
  - "I'm That Girl"
  - "Cozy"
  - "Cuff It"
  - "Energy" (feat. BEAM)
  - "Break My Soul"
  - "Church Girl"
  - "Thique"
  - "All Up In Your Mind"
  - "America Has a Problem"
  - "Pure/Honey"
  - "Summer Renaissance"
  - "Grown Woman"
  - "Daughter"
  - "Spaghetti" (feat. Linda Martell & Shaboozey)
  - "Alligator Tears"
  - "Levii's Jeans" (feat. Post Malone)
  - "Ya Ya"
  - "Riiverdance"
  - "II Hands II Heaven"
  - "Tyrant" (feat. Dolly Parton)
  - "Sweet / Honey / Buckiin'" (with Shaboozey)
- Boss – "Butterfly Effect"
- Billy Crawford – "Bright Lights Big City"
- Brit and Alex
  - "Beautiful"
  - "Heart Breaker"
  - "Preachin' to the Choir"
  - "That's My Baby"
- Britney Spears
  - "Me Against the Music"(feat. Madonna)
  - "Toxic"
- Brooke Valentine – "Ghetto Superstarz"
- Celine Dion – "Skies of L.A."
- Chlöe - "Looze U"
- Chris Brown – "You"
- Ciara
  - "Ciara To The Stage"
  - "High Price"
  - "Like A Surgeon"
  - "Keep Dancing" (feat. The-Dream)
  - "Lover's Thing" (feat. The-Dream)
- Dear Jayne
  - "Talkin' 'Bout Himself"
  - "I Loose Everything"
- Diddy – "Change"
- J. Holiday
  - "Bed"
  - "Laa Laa"
  - "Suffocate"
- Jamie Foxx
  - "Just Like Me (feat. T.I.)"
  - "Slow"
  - "Rainman"
  - "Why"
  - "Digital Girl (feat. Kanye West)"
- Janet Jackson – "Greatest X"
- Jay Electronica
  - "The Neverending Story"
  - "Shiny Suit Theory" (feat. The-Dream)
  - "Ezekiel's Wheel" (feat. The-Dream)
- Jay-Z
  - "Holy Grail" (feat. Justin Timberlake)
  - "Heaven" (feat. Justin Timberlake)
  - "Marcy Me"
- Jennifer Lopez – "Louboutins"
- Jesse McCartney
  - "Leavin"
  - "Undo"
- Jessie J - "Loud" (feat. Lindsey Stirling)
- Jon McLaughlin – "Smack Into You"
- Justin Bieber
  - "One Time"
  - "Baby" (feat. Ludacris)
- Karina Pasian – "16 @ War"
- Kylie Minogue - "Skirt"
- Lindsay Lohan
  - "Washing My Hands"
  - "Problem Solver (Call Me)"
- Lloyd
  - "I Need Love"
- Lucy Walsh
  - "Forever Since"
  - "So Uncool"
- Mario – "Crazy Kind of Love"
- Mariah Carey
  - "Touch My Body"
  - "Touch My Body (remix)" (featuring The-Dream)
  - "Betcha Gon' Know (The Prologue)"
  - "Obsessed"
  - "H.A.T.E. U"
  - "Candy Bling"
  - "Ribbon"
  - "Standing O"
  - "Inseparable"
  - "Up Out My Face"
  - "More Than Just Friends"
  - "The Impossible"
  - "They Don't Know Me (Unreleased)"
  - "I Need Things"
- Mary J. Blige
  - "Grown Woman" (feat. Ludacris)
  - "Just Fine"
  - "Feel Like a Woman"
  - "Shake Down" (feat. Usher)
  - "Roses"
  - "Come to Me (Peace)"
  - "Nowhere Fast"
  - "Mirror" (feat. Eve)
  - "Kitchen"
- Mýa – "Like Crazy"
- Nicole Scherzinger – "Powers Out" (feat. Sting)
- Nivea
  - "Complicated"
  - "I Can't Mess with You"
  - "Indian Dance"
  - "Let It Go"
  - "Okay" (feat. Lil Jon & YoungBloodZ)
  - "Red Cup" (feat. The-Dream)
  - "Watch It"
- Raheem DeVaughn – "Customer"
- Rihanna
  - "Breakin' Dishes"
  - "Lemme Get That"
  - "Sell Me Candy"
  - "Umbrella"
  - "Hatin' On The Club"
  - "Hard" (featuring Jeezy)
  - "Rockstar 101" (featuring Slash)
  - "Birthday Cake"
  - "Red Lipstick"
  - "Do Ya Thang"
  - "Phresh Out the Runway"
  - "Right Now" (featuring David Guetta)
  - "Nobody's Business" (featuring Chris Brown)
  - "Love Without Tragedy / Mother Mary"
- Rita Ora – "Roc The Life"
- Shawn Desman
  - "No More"
  - "Man in Me"
  - "Ooh"
- Steph Jones – "La La Means Love"
- Sterling Simms – "All I Need"
- Sugababes – "Gotta Be You"
- The Carters
  - "Salud"
- T.I.
  - "No Mercy"
- Taurus – "I Need Your Lovin'"
- Usher
  - "Moving Mountains"
  - "This Ain't Sex"
  - "Trading Places"
- Yung Joc – "Coffee Shop" (feat. Gorilla Zoe)
- Kim Kardashian – "Jam (Turn It Up)"

== See also ==
- The-Dream discography
