= First Love (Karina Pasian album) =

Studio album by Karina
- Released: August 19, 2008
- Length: 40:49
- Label: Def Jam
- Producers: Gordon Chambers; Cheese; The-Dream; Barry Eastmond; Kuk Harrell; Marshall Leathers; Los da Mystro; Ne-Yo; Oak; Tricky Stewart; Syience; Troy Taylor; Don Vito

Karina chronology
First Love (2008)	Something Warm to Wear (2020)

Singles from First Love
- 1. "16 @ War" Released: April 29, 2008; 2. "Can't Find the Words" Released: June 16, 2008

First Love is the debut studio album by Dominican-American R&B singer Karina Pasian. It was released by Def Jam on August 19, 2008 in the United States. The album debuted and peaked at number 57 on the US Billboard 200 and produced the singles "16 @ War" and "Can't Find the Words." First Love sold 9,000 copies in its first week. On December 3, 2008, it was nominated for a Grammy Award for Best Contemporary R&B Album but lost to Mary J. Blige's Growing Pains (2007).

== Background ==
In 2006, after a bidding war between Bad Boy Records, Interscope and Def Jam, Pasian signed with the latter. The singer recorded over 70 songs for the album, including a collaboration with John Legend called "Promise" that didn't make the album.

== Critical reception ==
Professional ratings
Review scores
Source	Rating
About.com	3/5 stars
AllMusic	3.5/5 stars
ARTISTdirect	3/5 stars
DJBooth.net	3.5/5 stars
USA Today	3/4 stars

AllMusic editor Andy Kellman found that material on First Love was "age-appropriate, a rare thing from a teenaged major-label artist in 2008 [...] Still, the album is as needed as Keke Palmer's So Uncool and Tiffany Evans – proud and smart, real and relatable, packed with substance." DJBooth.net felt that Pasian's "musical maturity" was stopping First Love "from becoming a great album. It’s as if she spent so much time proving to the world that she’s not just a teenage girl at times forgets how to be a teenage girl [...] It’s no surprise then the best song on the album comes when Karina embraces her age, but does so with in a deeply moving way." Steve Jones of USA Today praised Pasian's mature yet age-appropriate approach, highlighting her strong vocals and songs about family, determination, and self-confidence.

== Commercial performance ==
First Love debuted and peaked at number 57 on the US Billboard 200 in the week of September 6, 2008, with first week sales of 9,000 physical copies. It also reached number 11 on Billboard's Top R&B/Hip-Hop Albums chart. By December 2008, the album had sold a total of 28,408 copies.

== Track listing ==
First Love track listing
No.	Title	Writer(s)	Producer(s)	Length
1.	"90's Baby"	Warren Felder; Chasity Nwagbara	Oak	3:20
2.	"Baby Baby" (featuring Lil Mama)	Niatia Kirkland; Christopher Stewart; Terius Nash	Tricky Stewart; Kuk Harrell	3:50
3.	"Can't Find the Words"	Farrah Fleurimond; Carlos McKinney; Natalie Walker; Daniel Crawley	Los Da Mystro; Oak	3:58
4.	"16 @ War"	Stewart; Nash	Stewart; The-Dream; Harrell	3:23
5.	"Winner"	Rico Love; McKinney	Los Da Mystro; Love	4:11
6.	"The Love We Got"	Harrell; Stewart; Nash	Stewart; Harrell	3:34
7.	"Can You Handle It"	Reggie Perry; Shaffer Smith	Syience; Ne-Yo	4:40
8.	"They Ain't Gotta Love You"	Kandi Burruss; John Williams; Brandon Bowles	Don Vito; Cheese; Harrell	3:42
9.	"Slow Motion"	Gordon Chambers; Barry Eastmond; Vince Percy	Chambers; Eastmond	3:54
10.	"Can't Bring Me Down"	Chambers; Troy Taylor	Chambers; Taylor	3:14
11.	"First Love"	Chambers; Shawn Campbell; Marshall J. Leathers; Marcus Grant	Chambers; Campbell; Leathers	3:46
12.	"Go Back"	Ester Dean; Traci Hale; Perry		3:16
Total length:				40:49

== Charts ==
Weekly chart performance for First Love
Chart (2008)	Peak position
US Billboard 200	57
US Top R&B/Hip-Hop Albums (Billboard)	11
