= All I Need (Sterling Simms song) =

Single by Sterling Simms featuring Jadakiss & The-Dream

from the album Yours, Mine & The Truth
- Released: October 7, 2008
- Recorded: 2008
- Genre: R&B, Hip hop
- Length: 4:16
- Label: Def Jam, One Records
- Songwriter(s): T. Nash, B. Ervin, S. Ettinger, D. Pierce, D. Simon, J. Smith, C. Stewart
- Producer(s): Christopher "Tricky" Stewart

Sterling Simms singles chronology
"Nasty Girl" (2007)	"All I Need" (2008)

Jadakiss singles chronology
"By My Side" (2008)	"All I Need" (2008)	"Who Run This" (2008)

The-Dream singles chronology
"Fall Back" (2008)	"All I Need" (2008)	"Let Me See the Booty" (2008)

"All I Need" is a song by American R&B singer Sterling Simms from his debut studio album, Yours, Mine & The Truth. The single features Jadakiss and The-Dream. The song was produced by Tricky Stewart.

== Music video ==
Simms expressed that he wanted to have the video shot in Philadelphia, Pennsylvania or in Los Angeles, California to give himself a different look. "Hopefully we'll go in within the next few weeks and shoot the video".

== Charts ==
The single debuted at number 23 on the Bubbling Under R&B/Hip-Hop Singles (#123 on Hot R&B/Hip-Hop Songs) for the week of November 29, 2008.

Chart (2008)	Peak position
U.S. Billboard Bubbling Under R&B/Hip-Hop Singles	23
