= Radio Killa Records =

Record label

Coordinates: 40°45′57.243″N 73°58′56.362″W

- Parent company: Universal Music Group
- Founded: 2007
- Founder: Terius Youngdell Nash
- Status: Unknown
- Distributors: Def Jam Recordings (Universal Music Distribution)
- Country of origin: United States
- Location: New York
- Official website: radiokillarecords.com

Radio Killa Records is an American record label created by singer-songwriter/producer The-Dream. The label operates as an imprint of, and is distributed through, Def Jam Recordings. The-Dream is the CEO of the label, responsible for choosing all the singles released by its artists.

== Background ==
The-Dream signed a deal with Def Jam Recordings in 2007, following the success of Rihanna's 2007 hit "Umbrella", which he wrote and produced with production partner Christopher "Tricky" Stewart. That year, he also completed his debut studio album Love Hate, which was the debut release of the label. The-Dream has since released his second studio album, Love vs. Money, with his third, Love King, released in June 2010.

In 2008, the then-Executive Vice President of Def Jam Recordings Shakir Stewart, organized a meeting for Electrik Red with The-Dream and Tricky Stewart, who cosigned Electrik Red to Radio Killa. The-Dream and Stewart then became the group's executive producers for their debut album How to Be a Lady: Volume 1, which was released on May 26, 2009.

In an arrangement with chairman and CEO of Interscope Records, Jimmy Iovine, The-Dream was allowed to choose several artists to work with from the label's roster. The-Dream chose to work with Christina Milian on her fourth studio album Elope, among others. They collaborated in early 2009 and soon after he signed Milian to Radio Killa Records. The-Dream said that when he was building his label, he chose to work with Milian because he believed she was a talented singer. He said "it was one of these things where [when] you try to grow an artist, you can either grow them from the ground or you can come in and say, 'This artist needs this, that's all.' And that part of me I have, which is what she didn't have."

== Artists ==
- The-Dream
- Electrik Red

== Producers ==
The-Dream

Los Da Mystro

== Former artists ==
- August Alsina
- Christina Milian

== Releases ==
- The-Dream
  - Love Hate (2007)
  - Love vs. Money (2009)
  - Love King (2010)
  - 1977 (2012)
  - IV Play (2013)
  - Ménage à Trois: Sextape Vol. 1, 2, 3 (2018)
- Electrik Red
  - How to Be a Lady: Volume 1 (2009)
- August Alsina
  - Downtown: Life Under the Gun (2013)
