= Sweat It Out =

Sweat It Out may refer to:

- Sweat It Out (record label), an Australian record label started by Ajax (DJ)
- Sweat It Out (album), a 2008 album by The Pink Spiders
- "Sweat It Out" (The-Dream song), 2009
- "Sweat It Out" (Jimmy Barnes song), 1993
