= IV Play =

Studio album by The-Dream
- Released: May 28, 2013
- Genre: R&B
- Length: 58:51
- Labels: Radio Killa; Def Jam
- Producers: The-Dream, Carlos McKinney

The-Dream chronology
1977 (2011)	IV Play (2013)	Ménage à Trois: Sextape Vol. 1, 2, 3 (2018)

Singles from IV Play
- 1. "Slow It Down" Released: March 5, 2013; 2. "IV Play" Released: April 9, 2013; 3. "High Art" Released: May 15, 2013

IV Play is the fifth studio album by American singer-songwriter The-Dream. The album was released on May 28, 2013, by Radio Killa Records and Def Jam Recordings. It features guest appearances from Jay-Z, Big Sean, Beyoncé, Pusha T, 2 Chainz, Kelly Rowland, Gary Clark Jr. and Fabolous. IV Play is an R&B album with overtly sexual themes.

== Background ==
Prior to the release of his 2010 album Love King, The-Dream announced in interviews that it would be his final solo album. When the album was released, the song "Sex Intelligent (Remix)" featured a line in which the artist sang that he would release another album, titled Love Affair, on June 7, 2011. However, multiple delays pushed back the album's release for nearly two years and several different album titles were reported.

On the album's original release date, June 7, 2011, he released a promotional single free on the Internet, a medley of two new tracks titled "Body Work / Fuck My Brains Out." On August 31, he released the album 1977 for free online. The album was later retitled Terius Nash: 1977 and released commercially with a modified track list by Def Jam Recordings on December 18, 2012.

While backstage at the 2013 Grammy Awards, The-Dream revealed the final title to Billboard. In an interview on 106 & Park on April 2, 2013, The-Dream announced that Beyoncé, Kelly Rowland, Big Sean, and Jay-Z would appear on the album. On May 13, 2013 the track listing was revealed, including guest appearances by Pusha T, Gary Clark Jr. and 2 Chainz.

== Marketing and sales ==
In June 2011, The-Dream released a double promotional single titled "Body Work / Fuck My Brains Out." In 2012, he released "Roc" (initially reported to be the album's lead single, although the first single that appeared on the final version of the album was "Slow It Down", released as a digital download on March 5, 2013. On April 2, the official music video was released. The album's title track was released as the second single on April 9, and its music video was released on May 16. A music video for "Too Early", featuring Gary Clark Jr., was released on August 16. On May 15, the third single "High Art" was released.

In support of the album, he co-headlined the "Lights Out" tour with Kelly Rowland, though most of the tour dates were canceled after Rowland was hired as a judge on The X Factor. On May 20, 2013, The-Dream performed the song "Where Have You Been" with Rowland on The Tonight Show with Jay Leno. The following day, the album became available for streaming via The-Dream's VEVO channel.

IV Play sold 23,000 copies in its first week of release, debuting at number 16 on the Billboard 200 chart on June 5, 2013. By the end of the month, it had sold 42,000 in the US. In June 2015, it reached 68,000 copies sold there.

== Critical reception ==
Professional ratings
Review scores
Source	Rating
AllMusic	2/5 stars
The A.V. Club	B+
Consequence of Sound	3.5/5 stars
Entertainment Weekly	B+
Fact	3.5/5
The Guardian	2/5 stars
Pitchfork	6.9/10
Rolling Stone	3.5/5 stars
Slant Magazine	3.5/5 stars
Spin	7/10

IV Play was met with a lukewarm response from critics. According to Treble journalist Connor Brown, it was "without a doubt the worst reception that any of The-Dream’s records have received". At Metacritic, which assigns a weighted mean rating out of 100 to reviews from professional critics, the album received an average score of 62 — indicating "generally favorable reviews" based on 19 reviews.

Reviewing in May 2013, Spin magazine's Jordan Sargent said IV Play is "a very good album" and also one that lacks the level of experimentation featured on The-Dream's previous records, observing "too many songs here propped up on one simplistic notion". Jesse Cataldo of Slant Magazine applauded the second half of songs as "densely layered, immaculately produced, and frequently luminous", although he found the guest-heavy first half to be uneven. Pitchfork reviewer Andrew Ryce also criticized the "string of clunkers" early in the album, but felt that its highlights show that "the brilliant auteur we fell in love with is still in here somewhere." Alex Macpherson of The Guardian was more critical, saying it lacks the "panache" and "commitment" of The-Dream's past work while calling him "a grotesquely diminished figure promising bad sex in return for retreads of old ideas". AllMusic's Andy Kellman found the plentiful guest appearances "trivial", as well as the album itself.

== Track listing ==
No.	Title	Writer(s)	Producer(s)	Length
1.	"High Art" (featuring Jay-Z)	Terius Nash, Shawn Carter	The-Dream	4:29
2.	"IV Play"	Nash	The-Dream	5:38
3.	"Equestrian"	Nash	Carlos McKinney, The-Dream	4:23
4.	"Pussy" (featuring Big Sean & Pusha T)	Nash, Sean Anderson, Terrence Thornton	The-Dream	3:58
5.	"Turnt" (featuring Beyoncé & 2 Chainz)	Nash, Beyoncé Knowles, Tauheed Epps	The-Dream	3:46
6.	"Where Have You Been" (featuring Kelly Rowland)	Nash, Kelly Rowland	The-Dream, Da Internz, Miykal Snoddy	3:51
7.	"Too Early" (featuring Gary Clark Jr.)	Nash	The-Dream, Bart Schoudel	5:36
8.	"Michael"	Nash	The-Dream	4:54
9.	"Loving You / Crazy"	Nash	The-Dream	6:52
10.	"New Orleans"	Nash	The-Dream	4:07
11.	"Self-Conscious"	Nash	Carlos McKinney, The-Dream	3:07
12.	"Holy Love"	Nash	Carlos McKinney, The-Dream	3:37
13.	"Outro"	Nash	The-Dream	0:23
14.	"Slow It Down" (featuring Fabolous)	Nash, John Jackson	The-Dream	4:10
Total length:				58:51

Deluxe edition bonus tracks
No.	Title	Writer(s)	Producer(s)	Length
15.	"Divine"	Nash	The-Dream	4:25
16.	"Y'all"	Nash	The-Dream	5:31
17.	"Tron"	Nash	The-Dream	3:38
18.	"Psycho"	Nash	The-Dream	4:17

Climax bonus EP
No.	Title	Writer(s)	Producer(s)	Length
1.	"Com'On"	Nash	The-Dream	4:17
2.	"Roc"	Nash	The-Dream	5:30
3.	"Dope Bitch" (featuring Pusha T)	Nash, Terrence Thornton	The-Dream	4:35
4.	"Thirsty Whore"	Nash	The-Dream	4:03

== Personnel ==
Credits for IV Play are adapted from Allmusic.

- 2 Chainz – featured artist
- Kory Aaron – assistant engineer
- Eric Altenburger – art producer, photo production
- Zack Atkinson – art producer, photo production
- Chris Atlas – marketing
- Alton Bates – vocal engineer
- Beyoncé – featured artist
- Big Sean – featured artist
- Bernice Burgos – hair stylist, make-up
- Gary Clark, Jr. – featured artist
- Rob Cohen – assistant engineer
- Carol Corless – package production
- Da Internz – producer
- Los DaMystro – producer
- Demacio "Demo" Castellon – engineer
- The-Dream – creative director, executive producer, piano, producer, vocals
- Fabolous – featured artist
- Glass John – programming
- Trehy Harris – mixing assistant
- Hit-Boy – drum programming
- Sam Holland – assistant engineer
- Jaycen Joshua – mixing
- Jay-Z – featured artist
- Marcus Johnson – assistant engineer
- Terese Joseph – A&R
- Sean Kryston – set design
- Dave Kutch – mastering
- Karen Kwak – A&R
- Jason Patterson – assistant engineer
- Sara Pickett – hair stylist, make-up
- Chaka Pilgrim – executive producer
- Pusha T – featured artist
- Ramon Rivas – assistant engineer
- Jesus Rodriguez – assistant engineer
- Dave Rowland – assistant engineer
- Kelly Rowland – featured artist
- Todd Russell – art direction, creative director, design
- Lenny S. – A&R
- Bart Schoudel – additional production, bass, engineer, vocal producer
- Miykal Snoddy – producer
- Rob Suchecki – assistant engineer
- Brian "B-Luv" Thomas – engineer
- Pat Thrall – engineer, production engineer
- Meredith Truax – art producer, photo production
- Finis "KY" White – vocal engineer, vocal mixing
- Stuart White – vocal engineer
- Eric Wong – marketing
- Kristen Yiengst – art direction
- Andrew Zeah – photography
- Joe Zeff – illustrations

== Charts ==
=== Weekly charts ===
Chart (2013)	Peak position
US Billboard 200	16
US Top R&B/Hip-Hop Albums (Billboard)	2

=== Year-end charts ===
Chart (2013)	Position
US Top R&B/Hip-Hop Albums (Billboard)	79

== Release history ==
Region	Date	Format(s)	Label	Edition(s)
United States	May 28, 2013	CD, digital download	Def Jam Recordings	Standard, deluxe
