= So Good (Electrik Red song) =

Single by Electrik Red featuring Lil Wayne

from the album How to Be a Lady: Volume 1
- Released: February 3, 2009
- Recorded: 2009
- Genre: Dance-pop, R&B
- Length: 3:25 (Original Version); 3:29 (Remix)
- Label: Def Jam Records/Radio Killa
- Songwriters: Sean Hall, Terius Nash, Christopher Stewart
- Producers: The-Dream, Tricky Stewart, Sean K.

Electrik Red singles chronology
| "Drink In My Cup" (2008) | "So Good" (2009) |

Lil Wayne singles chronology
| "Prom Queen" (2009) | "So Good" (2009) | "Successful" (2009) |

"So Good" is the lead single for the debut album How to Be a Lady: Volume 1 by dance-pop girl group Electrik Red. The single was released on February 3, 2009 in the US and internationally on April 7, 2009. The remix version features rapper Lil Wayne, both the original and remix versions have music videos and were included on the album. Billboard named the song #80 on their list of 100 Greatest Girl Group Songs of All Time.

== Track listing ==
Russian CD Single

1. So Good (Clean) – 3:32
2. So Good (Dirty) – 3:32
3. So Good (Instrumental) – 3:30

US Digital Download 1

1. So Good (Main Version) – 3:25

US Digital Download 2

1. So Good (Remix) (Feat. Lil Wayne) – 3:29

== Chart performance ==
| Chart (2009) | Peak position |
|---|---|
| U.S. Billboard Hot R&B/Hip-Hop Songs | 60 |
