= Yours, Mine & The Truth =

Studio album by Sterling Simms
- Released: December 23, 2008
- Studio: Doppler Recording Studios, Atlanta; Euro South Studios, Atlanta; Groove Room, Atlanta; Home Cookin Studios, Philadelphia; Ninetimesnine Studios, Atlanta; Oakwud Lane Studios, Atlanta; Phoenix Ave. Studios, Atlanta; Studio At The Palms, Las Vegas; Triangle Sound Studios, Atlanta
- Length: 49:43
- Label: Def Jam
- Producer: The Runners, Christopher "Tricky" Stewart, The-Dream, Bryan-Michael Cox, Knightwritaz, Drumma Boy, Teddy Bishop, Pop & Oak, Soundz, Adonis Shropshire, "Smurf" Smith, Robert "eRob"

Sterling Simms chronology
Yours, Mine & The Truth (2008)	July's Finest (2011)

Singles from Yours, Mine & The Truth
- 1. "Vicky Gets Fired" Released: April 15, 2006; 2. "Nasty Girl" Released: April 16, 2007; 3. "All I Need" Released: November 4, 2008

Yours, Mine & The Truth is the debut album by the American R&B singer Sterling Simms. It was released on December 23, 2008, by Def Jam Recordings. The album was formerly known as Worth Your While, before being renamed.

== Promotion ==
The album's first single was "Vicky Gets Fired" featuring Sean P was released in April 2006. It peaking at number 56 on Billboard's Hot R&B/Hip-Hop Songs chart. Yours, Mine & The Truth's second single, "Nasty Girl", was released in April 2007 but it only hit number 17 on the Bubbling Under R&B/Hip-Hop Singles. As a result, "Nasty Girl" was removed from the album, resulting in a delay. The next single off the album was "All I Need," featuring then-labelmates The-Dream and Jadakiss. Sampling from Method Man's "I Need Love," it pealed at number 23 on the Bubbling Under chart. Though not announced as a single, a music video for "Boom Boom Room" was filmd. It co-stars Sarah Rosete from the girl group Electrik Red.

== Critical reception ==
Professional ratings
Review scores
Source	Rating
AllMusic	2.5/5 stars

AllMusic editor David Jeffries called the album "uneven." He found that while Yours, Mine & The Truth "starts on a high note [with] Simms' convincing, almost Usher delivery overcoming the song's shortcomings, the problem lies with tracks like the completely irresponsible "DUI (80 on the Freeway)," which tries to seduce the ladies with a story of outrunning the cops just to get the panties. It plays out like a Dave Chappelle skit." SoulTracks's L. Michael Gipson wrote: "Run as fast as you can in the opposite direction of this project, unless you like your R&B cynical and calculated. Even the tone deaf teens this perpetrator targets would be hard pressed to find a decent performance here. His Knightwraitz production team membership [...] makes this annoying project even more confusing. Opportunity lost."

== Commercial performance ==
Yours, Mine & The Truth debuted at number 100 on Billboard's US Top R&B/Hip-Hop Albums chart, while missing the Billboard 200 altogether. Two weeks later (charting week of December 24), the album rose to and peaked at number 89.

== Track listing ==
Yours, Mine & The Truth track listing
No.	Title	Producer(s)	Length
1.	"All I Need" (featuring The-Dream and Jadakiss)	Christopher "Tricky" Stewart	4:14
2.	"Playa"	Soundz	3:10
3.	"DUI (80 on the Freeway)"	Teddy Bishop; Greg Charley	3:40
4.	"Single"	Oak Felder; Mario	3:10
5.	"Bad Dream"	Stewart	4:05
6.	"Jump Off" (featuring Sean Paul of YoungBloodz)	Felder; Mario	3:36
7.	"I Know"	"Smurf" Smith; Robert "eRob"^{[a]}	3:30
8.	"Boom Boom Room"	Soundz	4:09
9.	"Best Friend"	Adonis Shropshire	4:13
10.	"Doin' Dat Dere"	Soundz	4:17
11.	"Sex In the City"	Felder; Mario	4:12
12.	"Let Her Go"	Andrew "Papa" Wansel	3:20
13.	"She Should Be Thanking You"	Stewart	4:07

Notes

- ^{^[a]} denotes additional producer(s)

== Charts ==
Chart performance for Yours, Mine & The Truth
Chart (2008)	Peak position
US Top R&B/Hip-Hop Albums (Billboard)	89
