= My Love (The-Dream song) =

Single by The-Dream featuring Mariah Carey

from the album Love vs. Money
- Released: February 24, 2009
- Recorded: 2008
- Studio: Legacy (New York, NY)
- Genre: R&B
- Length: 3:27
- Label: Radio Killa; Def Jam
- Songwriter(s): The-Dream; Mariah Carey; Carlos McKinney
- Producer(s): The-Dream; Carlos McKinney

The-Dream singles chronology
"Rockin' That Shit" (2008)	"My Love" (2009)	"Walkin' on the Moon" (2009)

Mariah Carey singles chronology
"I Stay in Love" (2008)	"My Love" (2009)	"Obsessed" (2009)

Music video
- "My Love" on YouTube

"My Love" is the second single from The-Dream's second studio album, Love vs. Money, featuring Mariah Carey. It was written by Carey, The-Dream, and Carlos McKinney, and produced by The-Dream and McKinney.

== Release ==
The single release was released to U.S. Top 40/Mainstream radio on January 27, 2009. It was sent to Urban and rhythmic radio on February 25, 2009. The song was released as digital download in the United States and Canada on February 24, 2009.

== Composition ==
The-Dream wrote the lyrics of the song with Mariah Carey in mind already before approaching the singer. Doubtful whether she, or her Island Def Jam Music Group label boss L. A. Reid would approve the duet, The-Dream started spreading news of the duet in various interviews. Reid was reportedly irritated by the producer's cunning move, but finally gave Carey permission to record it after she stated her interest in the song. 'My hunch was right, I just spoke it into existence.', commented The-Dream.

== Critical reception ==
Reviews of the song have been positive. Billboard magazine gave it a positive review saying it "may rewrite the history books" as they praised Carey's vocal performance saying "she relates wholeheartedly to the lyric, giving a gutsy, husky performance at the climax." In its review of Love vs. Money, Delusions of Adequacy stated that "There are slices of spicy, bumping R&B, like the Mariah Carey-featured, 'My Love', all-encompassing, confidence, laid-back jams like Mr. Yeah." Slant Magazine said: "'My Love', a ballad featuring a surprisingly restrained Carey jumping through Nash's hoops with all the docility of a tamed lion." PopMatters stated that "'My Love' takes the slow jam feel of "Rockin' That Shit" and puts Mariah Carey over it."

== Music video ==
The music video was shot in Los Angeles on Saturday, January 31 and was directed by Carey's then-husband Nick Cannon. The one-block stretch of South Pecan Street was closed to traffic and promptly at 3:30pm, the video shooting commenced with a scene showing Carey on a house porch singing.

The video starts with Carey and The-Dream in the kitchen talking about unpaid bills. He then storms out and is seen in a penthouse singing. Later in the video, Carey is seen cooking, and then on a porch singing. She gets ice cream with two kids, and The-Dream sees her and picks her up. During various parts of the video, Carey is seen singing in a bed, and in a parking lot with The-Dream and other people from the area.

The music video premiered exclusively on March 9, 2009, on MTV's networks and website. Since the video's premier, it has been viewed over 140,000 times on MTV website. The music video can be seen on Yahoo! Music. It impacted BET and was on the voting list of 106 & Park show. The music video was made available on iTunes on March 17, 2009.

It debuted at number 5 on the U.S. Billboard Hot Videoclip Tracks chart.

== Chart performance ==
The first week, "My Love" debuted at number 178 on the U.S. Billboard Hot Digital Songs chart, with 9,424 digital downloads sold. In its second week, the song climbed to number 73, accumulating almost 29,000 downloads, without promotion or music video. It sold more than 100,000 downloads in United States. The track debuted at number 62 on the U.S. Billboard Hot R&B/Hip-Hop Songs chart as the week's hot shot debut. The following week, the song climbed to number 50. It peaked at number 36. This is Carey's 47th chart entry on the R&B chart. On the U.S. Billboard Pop 100, the song debuted at number 90 and peaked at number 68. It debuted at number 82 on the U.S. Billboard Hot 100. The song marked Carey's 39th chart entry overall and her third as a featured artist, following Jadakiss' "U Make Me Wanna" and Busta Rhymes' I Know What You Want. It also debuted at number 38 on the U.S. Mainstream R&B/Hip-Hop chart and peaked at number 25. "My Love" ringtone debuted at number 40 on the U.S. Hot RingMasters chart and it has reached number 21.

According to Mediabase, "My Love" gathered 190,659,000 audience impressions and 25,546 total spins in the United States after its release. The track debuted at number 62 on the U.S. Hot R&B/Hip-Hop Airplay chart and it peaked at number 36. The track debuted at number 37 on the U.S. Billboard Rhythmic Airplay Chart and peaked at number 22. Carey extended her lead as the female artist with the most charted titles in the 16-year history of the Rhythmic Airplay Chart with "My Love"; the song is Carey's 34th entry.

== Charts ==
Chart (2009)	Peak position
US Billboard Hot 100	82
US Hot R&B/Hip-Hop Songs (Billboard)	36

== Release history ==
Region	Date	Format
United States	January 27, 2009	Top 40/Mainstream radio
United States	February 24, 2009	Digital download
Canada	February 24, 2009	Digital download
United States	February 25, 2009	Rhythmic and Urban radio
