= How to Be a Lady: Volume 1 =

Studio album by Electrik Red
- Released: May 26, 2009
- Recorded: 2008–2009
- Genres: Electropop; R&B; hip hop
- Length: 52:00
- Labels: Radio Killa; Def Jam
- Producers: The-Dream; Carlos McKinney; Sean K.; Tricky Stewart

Singles from How to Be a Lady: Volume 1
- 1. "Drink in My Cup" Released: December 2008; 2. "So Good" Released: February 3, 2009

How to Be a Lady: Volume 1 is the only studio album by American R&B girl group Electrik Red, released May 26, 2009, on Radio Killa Records and Def Jam Recordings. Production and songwriting for the album were handled primarily by The-Dream and Tricky Stewart. The album is largely based on R&B and pop while incorporating elements of funk, electropop, dance, crunk&B, soul and hip hop. The lyrics largely address sexual and gender-related themes.

The album debuted at number 100 on the U.S. Billboard 200 chart, selling 5,000 copies in its first week. It produced two singles, "Drink in My Cup" and "So Good", that achieved moderate chart success. “P is For Power” was intended as the third single with a music video, but neither were released. Upon its release, How to Be a Lady: Volume 1 received generally positive reviews from most music critics.

== Commercial performance ==
How to Be a Lady: Volume 1 spawned two official singles, "Drink in My Cup" and "So Good". Music videos were filmed for the singles; "Drink in My Cup" (and one for album track "Friend Lover") were directed by Marc Klasfeld. The group shot a video for the remix of their single "So Good" with rapper Lil Wayne. The album's second and final single, "So Good", peaked at #60 on the Hot R&B/Hip-Hop Songs.

The album debuted at number 100 on the U.S. Billboard 200 chart, with first-week sales of 5,000 copies in the United States. It ultimately spent one week on the chart. It also charted at number 20 on Billboard's Top R&B/Hip-Hop Albums chart.

== Critical reception ==
Professional ratings
Review scores
Source	Rating
Allmusic	4/5 stars
The Guardian	5/5 stars
Pitchfork Media	8.2/10
Rolling Stone	3/5 stars

How to Be a Lady: Volume 1 received generally positive reviews from music critics. Several writers drew comparisons to the early work of musician Prince, particularly side-projects such as Apollonia 6 and Vanity 6. Allmusic's Andy Kellman said that the album features "some of the best pop-R&B songs of 2009." Vibe magazine's Tracy Garraud said that it "flows with easy hooks, layered composition, and eccentric idioms particular to the pair—what separates it from previous work is its raciness." Blender called the group "the most musically proficient women to ever inspire drunken bar-top dancing and bad decisions." The Village Voice writer Rob Harvilla highly recommended the album to "Love vs. Money devotees able to suspend both their disbelief and their feminist ardor."

Pitchfork Media's Tim Finney praised its songwriting and wrote that the "gratuitous little surprises" in its production make its music "feel as real and lived-in as dazzling, shiny R&B can hope to, possessing a capacity for rightness that cannot be reduced to lyrical sophistication, performative flair, or production novelty, but is borne of the kind of charisma you can possess when you take success for granted." The Huffington Post's Marjon Rebecca Carlos praised the album's sexual and gender themes and its musical execution, stating "Loads of imagery, color, synth-beats and lithe forms come popping forth much to the listener's amusement." The Guardian's Alex Macpherson called it "a fully-formed and magnificently executed vision – of love, of sex – set to beats that thrill and seduce in equal measure, and sung with an unabashed confidence", citing it as "one of the most essential R&B albums of the decade."

In a mixed review, Rolling Stone magazine's Jon Dolan felt that the songwriting lacked "personality." Jon Pareles, writing in The New York Times, commended The-Dream and Tricky Stewart for their production's "lavished musical ingenuity", but found the album's sexual themes unimaginative.

== Track listing ==
All tracks are written by Terius Nash and Christopher "Tricky" Stewart, except where noted.

No.	Title	Producer(s)	Length
1.	"Muah"	The-Dream, Tricky Stewart	3:56
2.	"So Good" (Sean Hall, Nash, Stewart)	The-Dream, Tricky Stewart, Sean K.	3:25
3.	"Devotion"	The-Dream, Tricky Stewart	4:34
4.	"Freaky Freaky"	The-Dream, Tricky Stewart	4:17
5.	"Bed Rest"	The-Dream, Tricky Stewart	4:30
6.	"Friend Lover" (Carlos McKinney, Nash)	The-Dream, L.O.S Da Mystro	3:44
7.	"P Is for Power"	The-Dream, Tricky Stewart	3:49
8.	"W.F.Y."	The-Dream, Tricky Stewart	3:58
9.	"9 to 5" (McKinney, Nash)	The-Dream, L.O.S Da Mystro	3:33
10.	"On Point"	The-Dream, Tricky Stewart	3:08
11.	"Drink in My Cup"	The-Dream, Tricky Stewart	3:34
12.	"Go Shawty"	The-Dream, Tricky Stewart	3:00
13.	"Kill Bill"	The-Dream, Tricky Stewart	3:21
14.	"So Good" (Remix featuring Lil Wayne)	The-Dream, Tricky Stewart	3:29

== Personnel ==
Credits for How to Be a Lady: Volume 1 adapted from Allmusic.

- Ashaunna Ayars – marketing
- Jo Baker – make-up
- Tom Coyne – mastering
- Conor Gilligan – assistant
- Mark Grey – mixing assistant
- Christy Hall – production assistant
- Kuk Harrell – engineer, vocal engineer, vocal producer
- Kendu Isaacs – management
- Jahaun Johnson – management
- Sean K. – producer
- Giancarlo Lino – mixing assistant
- Scott Naughton – assistant
- Ciarra Pardo – art direction
- Dave Pensado – mixing
- Yves Aimé Pierre – assistant management
- Kelly "Becky 4 Real" Sheehan – engineer
- Chris "Tricky" Stewart – producer, executive producer
- Shakir Stewart – executive producer, A&R
- Brian "B Luv" Thomas – engineer
- Pat Thrall – engineer
- Randy Urbanski – mixing assistant
- Andrew Wuepper – mixing assistant

== Chart history ==
Chart (2009)	Peak position	Sales
U.S. Billboard 200	100	5,000+
U.S. Top R&B/Hip-Hop Albums	20	5,000+
U.S. Billboard Comprehensive Albums	107	5,000+
