= Young & Sexy =

Single by Lyric featuring Loon

from the album Lyric
- Released: August 6, 2002
- Genre: R&B, dance-pop, hip hop soul
- Length: 3:55 (Radio Edit)
- Label: J Records
- Songwriter(s): J. Knight, S. Estiverne, K. Jeffries
- Producer(s): Jack Knight, Steve Estiverne

Lyric singles chronology
"Young & Sexy" (2002)	"Episode" (2002)

Loon singles chronology
"I Do (Wanna Get Close to You)" (2002)	"Young & Sexy" (2002)	"Hit the Freeway" (2002)

"Young & Sexy" is the debut single by American R&B recording trio, Lyric. The song was produced by Jack Knight and Steve Estiverne and was co-written by background vocalist, Kia Jeffries. It also featured a guest appearance from former Bad Boy recording artist, Loon. The song is also noted for its publication under Sean "Diddy" Combs' publishing company, Justin Combs Publishing. The song peaked at #79 on Billboard Hot R&B/Hip-Hop Songs and served as the lead single for Lyric's unreleased self-titled debut album. It was also featured on the record-breaking, platinum-selling video game soundtrack, NBA Live 2003 and in the 2002 film, The Hot Chick.

== Music video ==
A music video for the song was shot in New Jersey and premiered on BET's 106 & Park in mid-September 2002.

== Track listings ==
CD single

1. "Young & Sexy" (Radio Edit) — 3:55
2. "Young & Sexy" (Radio Edit Without Rap) — 3:13
3. "Young & Sexy" (Instrumental) — 3:55
4. "Young & Sexy" (Call Out Hook) — 0:10

12" vinyl

1. "Young & Sexy" (Main) — 4:19
2. "Young & Sexy" (Instrumental) — 4:21
3. "Young & Sexy" (Main) — 4:19
4. "Young & Sexy" (Acappella) — 4:03

== Chart performance ==
Chart (2002)	Peak position
US Billboard Hot R&B/Hip-Hop Songs	79
