= 1977 (The-Dream album) =

- Original free edition

Studio album by The-Dream
- Released: August 31, 2011
- Recorded: 2011
- Genre: R&B
- Length: 57:43
- Label: Radio Killa
- Producers: The-Dream, Carlos McKinney

The-Dream chronology
Love King (2010)	1977 (2011)	IV Play (2013)

Alternative cover
- 2012 commercial release by Def Jam

1977 (also known as Terius Nash: 1977) is the fourth studio album by American singer-songwriter The-Dream. It was originally released as a free download on August 31, 2011, through the singer's Radio Killa website. Recorded over the course of two weeks, the album was issued in response to contractual issues with The-Dream's label, Def Jam Recordings, delaying the production of his planned IV Play album. 1977 was later released for commercial sale by Def Jam on December 18, 2012, and IV Play followed in 2013.

== Recording ==
Following issues with his contract with Def Jam Recordings, production on The-Dream's purported fourth studio album Love IV MMXII halted, having originally been due for release of September 20, 2011. As a result, The-Dream recorded additional material for a new album titled 1977 – named after the year of his birth – which he intended as a stopgap release following the delays to Love IV MMXII; the recording was done over the course of two weeks.

== Music and lyrics ==
According to Interview magazine, 1977 still features the "catastrophically lush productions" of The-Dream's previous three albums but departs from their "epic love-gushing Prince suite or sparse snap-and-bop". Instead, "accounts of love lost" are conceived as more of a "somber shrink visit", while the singer's "wiggling tenor sounds more liquored-up and angry than ever", with the magazine citing the song "Used to Be" as an account of "how his life's changed – at one point, he even jokes about ending it."

== Release ==
1977 was released as a free download through The-Dream's Radio Killa website on August 31, 2011, despite Def Jam's objections to the decision. The release was credited under the singer's legal name, Terius Nash. After Love IV MMXII failed to see a release during 2012, it was announced on November 14, 2012, that 1977 would be released for commercial sale by Def Jam on December 18, 2012. Unlike the free version of the album, where he was credited under his birth name Terius Nash, the commercial release will see The-Dream returning to being credited under his stage name. The new version of the album features the additional tracks "AK47" and "Tender Tendencies". Love IV MMXII would later be released as IV Play in 2013.

== Critical reception ==
Professional ratings
Review scores
Source	Rating
AllMusic	2.5/5 stars
Consequence of Sound	C+
MSN Music (Expert Witness)	(3-star Honorable Mention)
Newsday	B
Now	2/5
Pitchfork	7.9/10
PopMatters	7/10
Q	3/5 stars
Rolling Stone	2/5 stars
Slant Magazine	3.5/5 stars

1977 was met with generally positive reviews. At Metacritic, which assigns a normalized rating out of 100 to reviews from professional critics, the album received an average score of 66, based on 10 reviews.

Reviewing in September 2011, Pitchfork critic Jordan Sargent found 1977's music "engrossing" and "vivid" as a one-sided depiction of a failing relationship. Glenn Gamboa from Newsday felt the record "doesn't quite stack up against The-Dream's more polished work, lacking his usual lyrical wordplay and musical sophistication, but the intensity of the emotion keeps it interesting." Ken Capobianco of The Boston Globe felt that The-Dream shares "too much" with the more "confessional" album and said that "his usual sensual production and delicious hooks are missing, but the rawer musical approach serves the lyrics' edges." The New York Times critic Jon Caramanica wrote, "These songs aren't much more than melodic rants, but that's enough for Mr. Nash, who's never been a forceful singer, but whose talent for cramming oddball twists into R&B remains unparalleled." Robert Christgau gave 1977 a three-star honorable mention in his consumer guide for MSN Music, indicating "an enjoyable effort consumers attuned to its overriding aesthetic or individual vision may well treasure." He cited "Wedding Crasher" and "Used to Be" as highlights, although he also summed the album up with the judgement that "living for sex gets less dreamy all the time".

Other reviewers were less enthusiastic. Paul de Revere at Consequence of Sound praised the album's musical content, highlighting "Wish You Were Mine" as an "OMD-influenced synth banger" and "the record's best example of why Nash's production rivals many of his producer-performer contemporaries in rap and R&B." De Revere lamented, however, that Nash "doesn't seem like he's willing to fully own up to his shortcomings and take a full and deep-enough personal-via-lyrical inventory." AllMusic's Andy Kellman accused The-Dream of "tedious wallowing" and alternately "licking his wounds and puffing his chest", while Rolling Stone critic Matthew Trammell dismissed his lyrics as "poorly articulated male scorn rooted in juvenile, you-made-me-cheat reasoning". Tom Ewing from The Guardian regarded 1977 as "the worst thing" the singer had recorded, finding it marred by "unhappy, scab-picking".

== Track listing ==
2011 free download
No.	Title	Writer(s)	Length
1.	"Wake Me When It's Over"	Terius Nash
2.	"Used to Be"	Terius Nash
3.	"Long Gone"	Terius Nash
4.	"Ghetto" (featuring Big Sean)	David Borrego, Sean Anderson, Terius Nash
5.	"Wedding Crasher"	Terius Nash
6.	"Rolex" (featuring Casha)	Terius Nash
7.	"Silly" (Introducing Casha)	Terius Nash Rob Holladay
8.	"1977 (Miss You Still)"	Ralph Johnson, Douglas Gibbs, Shawn Carter, Terius Nash
9.	"Wish You Were Mine"	Terius Nash
10.	"This Shit Real Ni**a" (featuring Pharrell)	Pharrell Williams, Terius Nash
11.	"Form of Flattery"	Terius Nash

2012 commercial release
No.	Title	Writer(s)	Length
1.	"Wake Me When It's Over"	Terius Nash	5:36
2.	"Used To Be"	Terius Nash	4:55
3.	"Long Gone"	Terius Nash	4:16
4.	"Ghetto" (featuring Big Sean)	David Borrego, Sean Anderson, Terius Nash	5:27
5.	"Wedding Crasher"	Terius Nash	5:04
6.	"Rolex" (featuring Casha)	Terius Nash	3:41
7.	"1977"	Ralph Johnson, Douglas Gibbs, Shawn Carter, Terius Nash	5:07
8.	"Wish You Were Mine"	Terius Nash	3:54
9.	"Real" (featuring Pharrell)	Pharrell Williams, Terius Nash	5:18
10.	"Form of Flattery"	Terius Nash	4:15
11.	"AK47"	Terius Nash	4:57
12.	"Tender Tendencies"	Terius Nash	5:13

== Personnel ==
Credits are adapted from AllMusic.

- Sean Anderson - Composer
- Big Sean - Featured Artist
- Shawn Carter - Composer
- Casha - Featured Artist
- The-Dream - Art Direction, Design, Primary Artist
- Douglas Gibbs - Composer
- GoMillion - Photography
- Sam Holland - Assistant Engineer, Engineer
- Jaycen Joshua - Mixing
- Ralph Johnson - Composer
- Dave Kutch - Mastering
- Mike Larson - Engineer
- Ian Mercel - Assistant Engineer
- Terius Nash - Composer, Musician, Primary Artist
- Terius "The-Dream" Nash - Executive Producer, Producer
- Scott Naughton - Engineer
- Jason Patterson - Assistant
- Dave Pensado - Mixing
- Pharrell - Featured Artist
- Todd Russell - Art Direction, Design
- Bart Schoudel - Engineer
- Brian "B-Luv" Thomas - Engineer
- Pat Thrall - Engineer, Guitar, Mixing
- Robert Vaughn - Vocals
- Pharrell Williams - Composer
- Kristen Yiengst - Art Producer
- Jordan "DJ Swivel" Young - Engineer

== Charts ==
Chart (2012)	Peak position
US Top R&B/Hip-Hop Albums (Billboard)	29
