= Roc (The-Dream song) =

Single by The-Dream

from the album Climax
- Released: January 31, 2012
- Recorded: 2011
- Genre: R&B
- Length: 4:57
- Label: Radio Killa, Def Jam
- Songwriters: Terius Nash, Christopher Stewart

The-Dream singles chronology
"Make Up Bag" (2010)	"Roc" (2012)	"No Church in the Wild" (2012)

"Roc" is a song by American R&B recording artist The-Dream, released as a single for digital download on January 31, 2012. The song is included on The-Dream's EP Climax, which was ultimately a bonus CD on his fourth studio album IV Play (2013).

== Music video ==
The music video was released on February 23, 2012.

== Charts ==
Chart (2012)	Peak position
U.S. Billboard Hot R&B/Hip-Hop Songs	55

== Radio and release information ==
=== Radio adds ===
Country	Date	Format
United States	January 31, 2012	Urban radio

=== Purchaseable release ===
Country	Date	Format	Label
United States	March 6, 2012	Digital download	Island Def Jam
