= Carlos McKinney =

American record producer and jazz pianist

- Also known as: Los Da Mystro, LOS
- Born: January 10, 1973 (age 53); Detroit, Michigan, U.S.
- Genres: R&B, pop, jazz
- Occupations: Record producer, musician
- Instrument: Piano
- Years active: 1995–present
- Labels: Radio Killa, RedZone

Carlos McKinney (born January 10, 1973), known professionally as Los Da Mystro, is an American record producer and jazz pianist. He was signed to The-Dream's Radio Killa Records and Tricky Stewart's RedZone Entertainment as in-house production talent.

== Biography ==
McKinney was born into a Detroit jazz family. He is the nephew to pianist Harold McKinney, bassist Ray McKinney, trombonist Bernard McKinney (Kiane Zawadi), and drummers Earl McKinney and Walter Harris. He is a cousin to drummer Ali Jackson and trumpeter Khalil Jackson. His mother, Carolyn McKinney, is a singer, and his sister Shani McKinney is a pianist. His younger sister Thema "Tayma Loren" McKinney is a solo vocalist.

McKinney began studying piano at age four with his uncle Harold. His first professional appearances was with the R&B group Identity Band when he was 12. He studied classical music at the Center for Creative Studies from 1983 to 1991. He also studied harp under Patricia Terry-Ross of the Detroit Symphony Orchestra. After studying with Harold and Ray McKinney and Marcus Belgrave, he played with the Legacy Quintet (1989–93) and then attended The New School in New York City (1991–95). He played with Winard Harper (1992–93), Antonio Hart (1992–95), Buster Williams (1993), Wallace Roney (1994–96), Sonny Rollins, Elvin Jones, Steve Turre, Branford Marsalis, Wynton Marsalis, Roy Hargrove, Kenny Garrett and Charnett Moffett. He has played jazz festivals in Europe (from 1992), Senegal (1994), Iceland (1995), and Turkey (1997). His first album as a bandleader was Up-Front (Sirocco Jazz, 2000)

McKinney has worked as an arranger and record producer. He was assistant composer to James Mtume for the TV show New York Undercover from 1995. After brief stints with J and Atlantic Records, he received a contract from Def Jam Recordings, where he worked with musicians such as Case, Keithian, Ciara, Mariah Carey, Whitney Houston, Montell Jordan, Kandace Love, Babyface, and Redman.

He later joined RedZone Entertainment in 2008, though which he began producing for The-Dream, Bobby Valentino, and Jamie Foxx. The success of his first major hit, J. Holiday's "Bed", led him to work on other hit songs such as "Shawty Is a 10" by the-Dream and "I Invented Sex" by Trey Songz featuring Drake throughout 2009.

In 2013, he won a Grammy Award for his credits and production on the album Unapologetic by Rihanna.

In 2018, McKinney started working with The-Dream for Radio Killa Records's artist Bria Jhane on her debut album What is Love?.

In early 2019, McKinney co-produced (with Hitmaka) Chris Brown's song "Sorry Enough", from Brown's ninth album Indigo. The album has been certified triple platinum by the Recording Industry Association of America (RIAA) for combined sales and album-equivalent units of over 3,000,000 units in the United States.

== Discography ==
=== As leader ===
- 2000: Up-Front

=== As sideman ===
- 1993: Atymony, Bill Saxton
- 1993: For Cannonball & Woody, Antonio Hart
- 1994: I'm Glad There Is You: A Tribute to Carmen McRae, Vanessa Rubin
- 1994: It's All Good, Antonio Hart
- 1995: The Wallace Roney Quintet, Wallace Roney
- 1996: Shades of Blue, Bob Belden
- 1997: Kaelyn, Kaelyn
- 1998: Somewhere Along the Way, Buster Williams
- 1998: Joined at the Hip Buster Williams (TCB)
- 1999: The Truth: Heard Live at the Blue Note, Elvin Jones (Half Note, 1999)
- 2002: Groove at Jazz Entete, Ali Muhammed Jackson

=== Credits as composer ===
With The-Dream

- 2007: Love/Hate
- 2009: Love vs Money
- 2009: Walkin' on the Moon
- 2009: My Love
- 2010: Love King
- 2013: IV Play
- 2018: Ménage à Trois: Sextape Vol. 1, 2, 3

With others

- 2005: Encore et Encore, Assia
- 2007: Bed, J. Holiday
- 2007: You, Chris Brown
- 2008: Can't Find the Words, Karina
- 2008: First Love, Karina
- 2008: 6 in the Morning, Sean Garrett
- 2008: Turbo 919, Sean Garrett
- 2008: Intuition, Jamie Foxx
- 2008: Trading Places, Usher
- 2008: Uncle Charlie, Charlie Wilson
- 2009: Battlefield, Jordin Sparks
- 2009: D.N.A., Mario
- 2009: Love and Life, Rated R
- 2009: Memoirs of an Imperfect Angel, Mariah Carey
- 2009: Ready, Trey Songz
- 2009: The Rebirth, Bobby V
- 2009: Untitled, R. Kelly
- 2009: How to be a Lady: Volume 1, Electrik Red
- 2010: Back to Me, Fantasia
- 2010: Love Me Back, Jazmine Sullivan
- 2010: Only One Flo, Pt. 1, Flo Rida
- 2010: Still Standing, Monica
- 2011: 4, Beyoncé
- 2011: Future History, Jason Derulo
- 2012: The MF Life, Melanie Fiona
- 2012: Unapologetic, Rihanna
- 2012: Woman to Woman, Keyshia Cole
- 2013: Talk a Good Game, Kelly Rowland
- 2017: Summer Body, The-Dream
- 2017: It's Yo Birthday, The-Dream
- 2018: Head over Heels, Chromeo
- 2018: Ménage à Trois: Sextape Vol. 1, 2, 3, The-Dream
- 2019: What is Love?, Bria Jhane
- 2019: Indigo, Chris Brown
- 2021: "Automatic", TeeFlii

=== Singles ===
Year	Single	Peak chart positions							Artist	Album
Year	Single	US	US R&B	US Rap	US Pop	UK	CAN	NZ	Artist	Album
2002	"Relax Your Mind" (featuring Faith Evans)	—	52	—	—	—	—	—	Boyz II Men	Full Circle
2002	"Episode" (featuring Shells)	—	—	—	—	—	—	—	Lyric	Lyric
2003	"Hot & Tipsy"	—	—	—	—	—	—	—	Lyric	Lyric
2007	"Bed"	5	1	—	26	32	92	11	J. Holiday	Back of My Lac'
2007	"Shawty Is a 10" (featuring Fabolous)	17	6	—	45	—	—	36	The-Dream	Love Hate
2008	"Can't Find the Words"	—	88	—	—	—	—	—	Karina Pasian	First Love
2008	"Trading Places"	45	4	—	—	—	—	—	Usher	Here I Stand
2009	"Hands on Me"	—	88	56	—	—	—	—	Bobby Valentino	The Rebirth
2009	"Rockin' That Shit"	22	2	—	50	—	—	—	The-Dream	Love vs. Money
2009	"Walkin' on the Moon" (featuring Kanye West)	87	38	—	74	—	—	—	The-Dream	Love vs. Money
2009	"My Love" (featuring Mariah Carey)	82	36	—	—	—	—	—	The-Dream	Love vs. Money
2009	"I Invented Sex" (featuring Drake)	42	1	—	—	—	—	—	Trey Songz	Ready
2010	"Love King"	92	26	—	—	—	—	—	The-Dream	Love King
2017	"Summer Body" (featuring Fabolous)			—	—	—	—	—	The-Dream	Love Affair
2018	"Text Back"	—	—	—	—	—	—	—	Bria Jhane	TBD
2018	"Fragile"	—	—	—	—	—	—	—	Bria Jhane	TBD
2018	"Bedroom Calling" (featuring The-Dream)	—	—	—	—	—	—	—	Chromeo	Head over Heels
2021	"Automatic"	—	—	—	—	—	—	—	TeeFlii	Today
