= Love King (song) =

Single by The-Dream

from the album Love King
- Released: March 9, 2010 (U.S. - Rhythm/Crossover radio); March 16, 2010 (Digital Download)
- Recorded: 2009
- Genre: R&B, hip hop
- Length: 4:12 (Album Version); 5:02 (Explicit Single Version); 4:06 (Radio Edit)
- Label: Radio Killa, Def Jam
- Songwriters: Terius Nash, Carlos McKinney
- Producers: Los Da Mystro, The-Dream

The-Dream singles chronology
"Gangsta Luv" (2009)	"Love King" (2010)	"Make Up Bag" (2010)

Love King is a song by the American R&B artist The-Dream. It is the first single from his third studio album Love King. The song was premiered on February 17, 2010, on Def Jam's website. It was released digitally on March 16, 2010.

== Music videos ==
The music video was shot in March 2010 with the director Lil' X in Atlanta. The video was premiered on Black Entertainment Television's 106 & Park on April 7, 2010. Another video for the remix with Ludacris was filmed on April 1, 2010, with the director Clifton Bell. It was premiered on May 5, 2010.

== Remix ==
The remix features the rapper Ludacris. It was released on May 4, 2010. The second remix features the rapper Young Jeezy.

== Critical reception ==
Vibe wrote, "Terius Nash's new leadoff record from "Love King" has no "-ellas," but it's still much of the same: fingersnaps, repetition, and an unescapable catchphrase (you don't know me like that!). We haven't heard mindless music that sounds this good since... The-Dream's last single."

== Chart performance ==
"Love King" debuted on the Billboard Hot R&B/Hip Hop Songs chart at number 92 in the March 6, 2010, issue. It was officially sent to US radio stations on March 9, 2010. In the week following its release, it re-entered the chart at number 67, and reached its peak at number 37 the following. In the next week, due to the song gaining strong digital sales, it debuted on the Billboard Hot 100 at number 92 but fell off the chart the following week. The song later returned onto the chart at #97 but again fell off the following week.

== Charts ==
Chart (2010)	Peak Position
U.S. Billboard Hot 100	92
U.S. Billboard Hot R&B/Hip-Hop Songs	26
