= 16 @ War =

Single by Karina

from the album First Love
- Released: April 29, 2008
- Genre: R&B
- Length: 3:23
- Label: Def Jam
- Songwriters: Terius Nash; Christopher Stewart
- Producers: Tricky Stewart; Kuk Harrell (vocal production)

Karina singles chronology
"16 @ War" (2008)	"Can't Find the Words" (2008)

"16 @ War" is the debut single from Karina from her debut album First Love. It was written and produced by Tricky Stewart and The-Dream, while Kuk Harrell provided vocal production. The song expresses hardships of life from a sixteen-year-old girl's point of view. It spent eight weeks on the Hot R&B/Hip-Hop Songs chart, peaking at No. 51.

== Charts ==
Chart (2008)	Peak position
US Hot R&B/Hip-Hop Songs	51
US Hot R&B/Hip-Hop Airplay	51
