= Patricia Terry-Ross =

Patricia Terry-Ross is a harpist and music educator who was named Kresge Eminent Artist for 2017. She has been principal harpist at the Michigan Opera Theatre for 40 years as of 2017, and has also played with the Detroit Symphony Orchestra. She began studying the harp with Velma Froude at Cass Technical High School in Detroit; attended the University of Michigan where she received both Bachelor and Master of Music degrees, studying harp with Ruth Dean Clark and voice with Rosemary Russell. Terry-Ross did additional graduate work with harpist Lucile Lawrence at Tanglewood Institute in Massachusetts.
