= Rockin' That Shit =

Single by The-Dream

from the album Love vs. Money
- Released: December 9, 2008
- Genre: R&B
- Length: 3:42
- Label: Radio Killa; Def Jam
- Songwriter: T. Nash
- Producers: The-Dream; Tricky Stewart

The-Dream singles chronology
"Let Me See the Booty" (2008)	"Rockin' That Shit" (2008)	"My Love" (2009)

"Rockin' That Shit" (clean titled "Rockin' That Thang") is the first single from The-Dream's second studio album, Love vs. Money. The song features production by Tricky Stewart.

== Release ==
The song was digitally released on December 9, 2008. It was released to Rhythm/Crossover radio on the same day.

== Music video ==
The music video was shot on January 27, 2009, with director Ray Kay, and released on February 10, 2009. A music video supporting The-Dream's track "Rockin' That Thang", which is explicitly titled "Rockin' That S***", has been released. Directed by Ray Kay, the video mainly captures his performance with several sexy women dancing behind him. The members of Electrik Red are also featured as dancers in parts of the video and Nash appears to wear a thriller jacket.

It ranked at #14 on BET's Notarized: Top 100 Videos of 2009 countdown.

== Remix ==
The official remix featuring Fabolous, Ludacris, Rick Ross, Juelz Santana and an intro from DJ Khaled. It was released via iTunes on February 17, 2009. The music video was shot in New York City on February 12, 2009, and premiered on Yahoo! Music on Monday, March 9, 2009.

=== Other remixes ===
- Rockin' That Thang (featuring Busta Rhymes & Fabolous)
- Rockin' That Thang (featuring N.O.R.E.)
- Rockin' That Thang (featuring Freeway)
- Rockin' That Thang (Trey Songz freestyle)
- Rockin' That Shit (featuring Jamie Foxx)
- Rockin' That Shit (featuring T.I.)
- She Coppin' That Thang" (Rock City freestyle)

== Charts ==
=== Weekly charts ===
Chart (2008–2009)	Peak position
US Billboard Hot 100	22
US Hot R&B/Hip-Hop Songs (Billboard)	2
US Rhythmic Airplay (Billboard)	10
US Pop 100 (Billboard)	50

=== Year-end charts ===
Chart (2009)	Position
US Billboard Hot 100	80
US Hot R&B/Hip-Hop Songs (Billboard)	5
US Rhythmic (Billboard)	27
