= Sweat It Out (The-Dream song) =

Single by The-Dream

from the album Love vs. Money
- Released: August 11, 2009
- Recorded: 2008
- Genre: R&B
- Length: 4:24
- Label: Radio Killa/Def Jam
- Songwriters: The-Dream, Tricky Stewart
- Producers: The-Dream, Tricky Stewart

The-Dream singles chronology
"Digital Girl" (2009)	"Sweat It Out" (2009)	"Gangsta Luv" (2009)

"Sweat It Out" is the fourth single from The-Dream's second studio album, Love vs. Money.

== Music video ==
On September 26, 2009, in an interview with Rap-Up, Tricky Stewart confirmed that music videos for both "Sweat It Out" and "Fancy" are going to be filmed soon. Eventually, however, those plans were scrapped as The-Dream confirmed via Twitter that he is no longer promoting singles from Love vs. Money.

== Charts ==
Chart (2009)	Peak Position
U.S. Billboard Hot R&B/Hip-Hop Songs	32
