= Love vs. Money (The-Dream album) =

Studio album by The-Dream
- Released: March 10, 2009
- Studio: Chung King (New York City); Legacy (New York City); Studio at the Palms (Las Vegas); Studio at the Shore (Malibu); Triangle Sound (Atlanta)
- Genre: R&B
- Length: 56:05
- Label: Radio Killa; Def Jam
- Producer: Christopher "Tricky" Stewart; The-Dream; Lil Jon; Los Da Mystro

The-Dream chronology
| Love/Hate (2007) | Love vs. Money (2009) | Love King (2010) |

Singles from Love vs. Money
- 1. "Rockin' That Shit" Released: December 9, 2008; 2. "My Love" Released: February 24, 2009; 3. "Walkin' on the Moon" Released: April 28, 2009; 4. "Sweat It Out" Released: August 11, 2009

Love vs. Money is the second studio album by American singer-songwriter The-Dream. It was released on March 10, 2009, by Radio Killa and Def Jam Recordings.

The album was written and produced primarily by The-Dream with his creative partner Christopher "Tricky" Stewart. Recording sessions for the album took place at several recording studios, including Chung King Studios in New York City and Studio at the Palms in Las Vegas. With the album, The-Dream sought to amplify the sonic dynamics of his debut album Love/Hate, incorporating elements of pop and electro. Love vs. Money features themes of seduction, rejection, and money in relation to romantic love.

The album debuted at number two on the US Billboard 200, selling 151,000 copies in its first week. It spent 17 weeks on the chart, and by May 2009, it had sold 331,000 copies in the United States. Four singles were released and performed well on Billboard charts, including "Rockin' That Shit", "Walkin' on the Moon" and "Sweat It Out". Love vs. Money was a widespread critical success and listed by several publications as among the best albums of 2009.

== Recording ==
The album is the follow-up to The-Dream's gold-certified debut album, Love/Hate (2007). He re-teamed with his production partner Christopher Stewart, who produced most of the tracks on the album, and Los Da Mystro He also enlisted the help of Lil Jon for the song "Let Me See the Booty". He initially stated that he had collaborated with Ludacris and Fabolous, however they failed to appear on the final track listing. At an album listening event, a song booklet was given showing the album's initial track listing, including the unreleased "Touch & Feel" and "Nothing but Love". Rapper Kanye West and singer Mariah Carey both appear on the album as guest features.

Recording sessions for the album took place at Chung King Studios and Legacy Recording Studios in New York City, with additional recording done in Las Vegas, Nevada, Malibu, California, and Triangle Sound Studios in Atlanta, Georgia. The album's packaging features photography by Joseph Cultice.

== Music and lyrics ==
"Fancy"
A sample of "Fancy" which showcases the relaxed, smooth composition style on the album.

"Walkin' on the Moon"
"Walkin' on the Moon" features an electrically driven beat and contains a guest verse delivered by musician Kanye West.

Primarily an R&B album, Love vs. Money incorporates elements of electro and pop music, while its lyrics concern themes of love, sex, and money. The production incorporates elements such as broad synthesizer lines, punchy drumbeats, and computerized vocals. Its musical structure features the "stream-of-consciousness" song transition of The-Dream's debut album Love/Hate. Alex Macpherson of The Quietus characterizes the album as "a palindromic song cycle of seduction, rejection, recrimination and ultimately – maybe – validation", writing that "as on Love/Hate, the tension between the character The-Dream likes to project – the cocky, preening, slightly lecherous lothario – and the reality of who he is – a slightly bug-eyed chump – proves fruitful." Macpherson views the album's centrepiece, its two title tracks, as a "stürm und drang" turning point for The-Dream's character, in which he mulls over a disastrous relationship. Jordan Sargent, critic for PopMatters, mused on The-Dream's approach to composition:

He doubled down on his signature formula of classicist R&B song structures and themes fused with production influenced as much by Southern rap as Prince. And with the album's four-song centerpiece, [The-Dream] fleshes out the album's central conceit (the push/pull between love and money) with a jaw-droppingly operatic suite that blazes a trail from industrial beats to jazz pianos to beatboxing. It's sandwiched in between sex jams that are both goofy and futuristic, adding up to an album equally suited for the bedroom, the car, and the stage.

The Washington Post's Allison Stewart writes that the album "cribs heavily from vintage R. Kelly in the same way its predecessor,... 'Love Hate', borrowed from 'Purple Rain'-era Prince". The track "Kelly's 12 Play" references R. Kelly's 1993 album 12 Play. In an interview for DJBooth, The-Dream discussed his musical approach to the album, stating "This album's gonna be the same thing – a little more beefed up, I'm just gonna give you more. Every album I'm just gonna try to give you more of me, and what I think about certain things... This album is just gonna be the first album on some out of this world crack, basically". In an interview for The Village Voice, he discussed his use of melody, repetition, and hooks, relating it to child discipline, saying that "Americans are not the biggest listeners. I didn't listen, which is why my granddaddy beat me half the time. It's only when the belt is swinging at you in the same repetitive manner that you actually start to listen. So it's all about creating a belt on the song that repetitiously swings at you. It doesn't mean that in between the belt swinging, I'm not saying stuff that means something".

== Marketing and sales ==
"Rockin' That Shit" was released on December 8, 2008, as the lead single in support of the album. It reached number 22 on the Billboard Hot 100. The second single "My Love" reached number 82, the third single "Walkin' on the Moon" reached number 87, and the final single "Sweat It Out" reached number 32 on the Hot R&B/Hip-Hop Songs.

Originally set for release by the end of 2008, Love vs. Money was released on March 10, 2009, through The-Dream's imprint label Radio Killa and Def Jam Recordings. It debuted at number two on the Billboard 200, selling 151,000 copies in its first week. By May 2009, it had sold 331,000 copies, according to Nielsen SoundScan. On May 13, The-Dream embarked on a 21-city tour with R&B singer Keyshia Cole, first playing the Aronoff Center in Cincinnati and concluding the tour at Paramount Theater in Oakland on June 21.

== Critical reception ==
Love vs. Money ratings
Aggregate scores
| Source | Rating |
|---|---|
| Metacritic | 83/100 |
Review scores
| Source | Rating |
| AllMusic | 4.5/5 stars |
| Blender | 3.5/5 stars |
| Entertainment Weekly | C+ |
| HipHopDX | 4.0/5 |
| MSN Music (Consumer Guide) | (2-star Honorable Mention) |
| PopMatters | 6/10 |
| Rolling Stone | 4.5/5 stars |
| Slant Magazine | 4/5 stars |
| Tiny Mix Tapes | 4.5/5 |
| USA Today | 3.5/4 stars |

Love vs. Money was met with widespread critical acclaim. At Metacritic, which assigns a normalized rating out of 100 to reviews from professional publications, the album received an average score of 83, based on 13 reviews.

Reviewing in March 2009 for Rolling Stone, Jody Rosen found most of the album's songs "unforgettable" and said, "the combination of classicist songcraft, wild sound collage and a muse that partakes equally of the sensual and the silly makes Love vs. Money far more than just an accomplished genre piece". Alex Macpherson of The Quietus noted its cyclical thematic structure, but stated, "it's how the wheel turns, endlessly and inevitably, which is what compels about Love vs Money." Slant Magazine's Wilson McBee viewed it as an improvement over Love Hate and wrote that it "keeps to the same aesthetic touchstones [...] while cranking up the gears of ambition". He also called the album "a cohesive, front-to-back artistic statement", and said of its studio and hook-oriented "songcraft": "What keeps all this over-production from being distracting is Nash's intelligent arrangements and a keen avoidance of clutter." AllMusic editor Andy Kellman hailed it as "Love/Hate's equal, stuffed with hooks, ceaselessly absorptive productions, and clever and often funny wordplay". Sean Fennessey of Vibe praised The-Dream's production and stated, "The craft is meticulous, and the sound so epic, and at times, operatic [...] that moments on this album comprise some of the best pop music of the decade". Ajitpaul Mangat of Tiny Mix Tapes applauded The-Dream's interpretation of the "pop formula" and dubbed the album "a fascinating and at-times sonically remarkable post-structuralist-esque move". The Boston Globe's Ken Capobianco called it "a seamless, brilliantly produced affair featuring his unmatched contemporary pop technique and songwriting craftsmanship".

Some reviewers were more reserved in their praise. Tyler Fisher of PopMatters called Love vs. Money "an R&B pop album with great production, composition, and lyricism", but also observed "cliché love songs, too many similar beats and melodies, and a lack of energy". Robert Christgau, writing in Blender magazine, said The-Dream and Tricky Stewart's "multiplex jams" are of "deeper intrinsic sensual interest" than the hooks of the more popular R&B singer Akon, highlighting the track "Love vs. Money: Part 2". But overall, Christgau found the album "studiously conventional" and questioned whether another "gloriously eccentric sex album" was needed after Love Hate. Regarding its lyrical content, he concluded, "The-Dream will turn on only the many hopeful ladies who consider Patrón the most exquisite of aphrodisiacs." More critical was Entertainment Weekly's Mikael Wood, who believed the lyrics are marred by "material obsession", and said The-Dream's "vision of romance mostly plays like a nightmare".

At the end of 2009, the album was ranked by Rolling Stone as the year's eighth best. Time ranked the album number six on its year-end list for 2009.

== Track listing ==
Love vs. Money standard edition
| No. | Title | Writer(s) | Producer(s) | Length |
|---|---|---|---|---|
| 1. | "Money Intro" | | | 0:09 |
| 2. | "Rockin' That Shit" | Terius "The-Dream" Nash; Christopher "Tricky" Stewart; Sean Hall | The-Dream; Tricky | 3:41 |
| 3. | "Walkin' on the Moon" (featuring Kanye West) | Nash; Carlos McKinney; Kanye West | The-Dream; Los Da Mystro | 4:14 |
| 4. | "My Love" (featuring Mariah Carey) | Nash; McKinney; Mariah Carey | The-Dream; Los Da Mystro^{[a]} | 3:24 |
| 5. | "Put It Down" | Nash; McKinney | The-Dream; Los Da Mystro | 5:01 |
| 6. | "Sweat It Out" | Nash; Stewart | The-Dream; Tricky | 4:24 |
| 7. | "Take U Home 2 My Mama" | Nash; Stewart | The-Dream; Tricky | 3:39 |
| 8. | "Love vs. Money" | Nash; Stewart | The-Dream; Tricky | 4:11 |
| 9. | "Love vs. Money: Part 2" | Nash; Stewart | The-Dream; Tricky | 4:12 |
| 10. | "Fancy" | Nash; Stewart | The-Dream; Tricky | 6:29 |
| 11. | "Right Side of My Brain" | Nash; Stewart | The-Dream; Tricky | 4:26 |
| 12. | "Mr. Yeah" | Nash; Stewart | The-Dream; Tricky | 4:53 |
| 13. | "Kelly's 12 Play" | Nash; McKinney | The-Dream; Los Da Mystro | 4:17 |
| 14. | "Let Me See the Booty" (bonus track) (featuring Lil Jon) | Nash; Jonathan Smith | The-Dream; Lil Jon | 3:34 |

Deluxe edition (bonus tracks)
| No. | Title | Writer(s) | Producer(s) | Length |
|---|---|---|---|---|
| 15. | "Hater" | Nash; Stewart | The-Dream; Tricky | 5:29 |
| 16. | "Rockin' That Shit" (Remix) (featuring Fabolous, Juelz Santana, Rick Ross and Ludacris) | Nash; Stewart; Hall; John Jackson; LaRon James; William Roberts II; Christopher Bridges | The-Dream; Los Da Mystro | 5:00 |

Notes

- ^{^[a]} signifies a co-producer

== Personnel ==
Credits are adapted from AllMusic.

- Chris Bellman – mastering
- Lee Blaske – strings
- Dre Bowman – bass
- Mariah Carey – vocals
- Joseph Cultice – photography
- Steven Dennis – assistant engineer
- The-Dream – audio production, vocals
- Mark Grey – mixing assistant
- Christy Hall – production assistant
- Ryan Kelly – assistant engineer
- Giancarlo Lino – mixing assistant
- Pamela Littky – cover photo, inlay photography
- Chris "Tek" O'Ryan – engineer, production engineer
- Dave Pensado – mixing
- J. Peter Robinson – art direction
- Jason Sherwood – assistant engineer
- Chris "Tricky" Stewart – producer, audio production
- Brian "B Luv" Thomas – engineer
- Pat Thrall – engineer, production engineer
- Randy Urbanski – assistant engineer
- Kanye West – vocals
- Ryan West – vocal recording
- Andrew Wuepper – engineer, mixing assistant

== Charts ==
=== Weekly charts ===
Weekly chart performance for Love vs. Money
| Chart (2009) | Peak position |
|---|---|
| Canadian Albums (Nielsen SoundScan) | 69 |
| UK R&B Albums (OCC) | 25 |
| US Billboard 200 | 2 |
| US Indie Store Album Sales (Billboard) | 2 |
| US Top R&B/Hip-Hop Albums (Billboard) | 1 |

=== Year-end charts ===
Year-end chart performance for Love vs. Money
| Chart (2009) | Position |
|---|---|
| US Billboard 200 | 71 |
| US Top R&B/Hip-Hop Albums (Billboard) | 12 |

== Certifications ==
Certifications for Love vs. Money
| Region | Certification | Certified units/sales |
|---|---|---|
| United States (RIAA) | Gold | 500,000^{^} |
^{^} Shipments figures based on certification alone.

== See also ==
- How to Be a Lady: Volume 1
- Song cycle
