= Sterling Simms =

- Born: Sterling Lauren Simms; July 7, 1982 (age 43)
- Origin: Philadelphia, Pennsylvania, United States
- Genres: R&B, hip hop
- Occupation: Singer-songwriter
- Years active: 2006–present
- Labels: Def Jam; RCA
- Formerly of: Knightwritaz
- Website: sterlingsimms.com

Sterling Lauren Simms (born July 7, 1982), is an American R&B singer-songwriter. His debut album, Yours, Mine & The Truth was released on December 23, 2008, by Def Jam Records.

== Biography and career ==
Sterling recorded his first song with his grandfather at the age of 6. His grandfather, a musician himself, introduced him to the sounds of Sam Cooke. When he was 15, his mother moved the family of four children to Atlanta. There Sterling began to make the rounds with Dallas Austin, Jermaine Dupri and other music makers in the city.

After a period struggling, Sterling began to focus on writing, putting his artist ambitions aside. Returning to Philadelphia, Sterling reconnected with Kenny Gamble. Back in Atlanta, Sterling met up with producer Teddy Bishop, who liked the songs Sterling was working on. Bishop asked, "Who was the voice behind the songs?" At Teddy's prompting Sterling decided to pursue becoming a performer again. He sang for Lyor Cohen, Kevin Liles and a group of other influential music executives, giving them Sam Cooke's "A Long Time Coming." They were impressed with Sterling and by this time Warner Bros and Atlantic were very interested in signing him. While waiting for an offer, Sterling traveled to Miami with Bishop to the VMAs. Bishop played Sterling's music for industry veteran George Robinson. Robinson recognized his talent at once and convinced the partners of One Recordings to make Sterling their first release.

Sterling signed with One Recordings and began finishing his album and eventually a meeting was set up with L.A. Reid at Island/Def Jam. Two months later One Recordings signed a deal with Island/Def Jam to jointly release Sterling Simms. Sterling's musical influences include Boyz II Men, Aaliyah, Sade, Brian McKnight, Mario, New Edition, Usher and Latin music generally. In 2009, Sterling co-wrote "Robot Love," a song on Allison Iraheta's debut album "Just Like You," which will be released on December 1, 2009.

In early 2011, Sterling signed a recording deal with RCA Records and is currently working on his second effort.

== Discography ==
=== Studio albums ===
- Yours, Mine & The Truth (2008)
- 11 Missed Calls (2013) [Unreleased]

=== Mixtapes ===
- July's Finest (2011)
- Mary & Molly (2012)

=== Guest appearances ===
- 12. "Dig A Hole" (with Jay-Z) on "Kingdom Come" (2006)
- 03. "Was It Worth It" (with Kid Ink) on "Almost Home" (2013)

=== Singles ===
| Year | Single | Chart positions | | | Album |
| Year | Single | US Hot 100 | US R&B/ Hip-Hop | Rhythmic Top 40 | Album |
|---|---|---|---|---|---|
| 2007 | "Jump Off" (featuring Sean P) | — | 56 | 39 | Yours, Mine & The Truth |
| 2007 | "Nasty Girl" | — | 117 | — | Non-Album Track |
| 2008 | "All I Need" (featuring Jadakiss & The-Dream) | — | 123 | — | Yours, Mine & The Truth |
| 2012 | "Tell Her Again" (featuring Meek Mill) | — | 62 | — | 11 Missed Calls |
| 2013 | "I Know Love" (featuring Pusha T) | — | — | — | 11 Missed Calls |
