= Love King =

Studio album by The-Dream
- Released: June 29, 2010
- Studios: The Nash Estate (Atlanta); Triangle Sound (Atlanta); Setal (Miami); Studio at the Palms (Las Vegas)
- Genre: R&B
- Length: 54:44
- Labels: Radio Killa; Def Jam
- Producers: Christopher "Tricky" Stewart; The-Dream; Los Da Mystro

The-Dream chronology
Love vs. Money (2009)	Love King (2010)	1977 (2011)

Singles from Love King
- 1. "Love King" Released: March 16, 2010; 2. "Make Up Bag" Released: June 8, 2010; 3. "Turnt Out" Released: June 21, 2010

Love King is the third studio album by American singer-songwriter The-Dream. It was released on June 29, 2010, by Radio Killa Records and Def Jam Recordings.

The-Dream produced Love King with fellow songwriters/producers Christopher "Tricky" Stewart and Los Da Mystro. It expands on the suite-like conceit and themes of the singer's previous albums, exploring traditional R&B themes of love, sex, money, and infidelity, with sensibilities of arrogance and swagger. The music has been noted for its layered sonic elements and detailed production.

Love King debuted at number four on the US Billboard 200 chart, selling 58,000 copies in its first week. Two singles were released in support of the album – the title track and "Make Up Bag" – and achieved moderate chart success. Critically, the album was well received for The-Dream's production and sexually boastful lyrics, and it was included in several publications' year-end lists of 2010's best records.

== Recording ==
Recording sessions for the album took place at Setal Studio in Miami, Florida, Studio at the Palms in Las Vegas, Nevada, The Nash Estate in Atlanta, Georgia, and Triangle Sound Studios in Atlanta. After reports of the album being under production, The-Dream said that the album would be his final studio album. In January 2010, he said that he had finished recording Love King and called it his best album yet.

== Music and lyrics ==
'Make Up Bag'
The song features digital bass tones, A minor piano chords, and a double entendre; the make up bag as a designer handbag purchased to make amends.

"Turnt Out"
The sultry, midtempo song has sexually boastful lyrics, flanged guitar riffs, shuffling drums, and floating falsetto vocals.

Love King expands on the suite-like production style and de rigueur-R&B themes of his previous two albums. The-Dream has described the album as being "deeper than space". Pitchfork's David Drake noted his musical style as "Tin Pan Alley song concepts and an unceasing sense of musical craft", writing "When a song would be best served by space, he gives it plenty. Every piano chord and finger snap and bass hit is in its right place. He sweats every detail but never loses sight of how the album works as a whole".

Tom Ewing of The Guardian viewed that the mood created for the album "captures the dreamy, shimmering lustfulness of summer", writing that its songs "are built around layers of cascading, pulsing synth melodies, with the overall feeling one of tremulous romantic urgency; even an outright bedroom workout like 'Panties to the Side' slips into wistful lushness". The Guardian's Michael Cragg viewed that its "mid-paced songs [...] take the icky sex ballad template perfected by R. Kelly and wraps it in sparse, forward-thinking productions", writing that they "ride crisp, finger-snapping beats augmented by huge synth rushes, while moments of experimentation flutter around the periphery". Noting it as "ear candy", Alex Macpherson of The National wrote that the album features an emphasis on mood over traditional songcraft and elaborated on its music, stating:

He picks up narratives left hanging from previous albums, magnifies recurring themes and takes signature production techniques to extremes. The album's structure – a seamless ebb and flow of interlinked songs – is dizzyingly grandiose, underpinned by a complementary sense of theatre and elegance. Most importantly, though, through these devices, Nash reveals more and more of the contradictions and complexities at the core of his work: the instability generated by his obsessive examination of traditional R&B tropes – love, sex, money – from every possible angle; the frictions of his own fractured self-perception.

The-Dream's lyrics are characterized by cockiness and "swagger". Michael Cragg of The Guardian found the lyrics "boastful, ridiculously egocentric and often lyrically hilarious". Anupa Mistry of Urb noted The-Dream's "neutralizing alpha male steez" and commented that "the most carnal, but still so everyday, type of passion informs" the album's songs. According to Alex Macpherson, The-Dream, "in both his lyrics and instrumentation [...] moves back and forth between flippancy and heart-swelling sincerity as if they were one and the same; he plays the role of the unfaithful boyfriend convincingly, largely, it seems, because he knows that he'll find forgiveness soon enough". The narrative of "Make Up Bag" involves an unfaithful boyfriend who advises to make amends for his serial infidelity by buying an expensive cosmetics bag for his girlfriend.

== Marketing and sales ==
The album's title track and first single "Love King" was released on February 17, 2010, through Def Jam's website. Following its release, The-Dream said that he would release four singles and four music videos prior to the album's release. "Love King" was later released for digital download on March 16, 2010 through iTunes. The song peaked on Billboard's Hot R&B/Hip-Hop Songs at number 37. The second single "Make Up Bag" was sent to US urban radio on May 11, 2010. It was sent to US rhythmic radio on June 1, 2010. The song features rapper T.I. and is produced by The-Dream. The single artwork was released on May 19, 2010, and was confirmed to be the second single released from the album. "Make Up Bag" was released June 8, 2010 to iTunes. "Turnt Out" was the album's third single as stated on The-Dream's official website and was released via the iTunes Store on June 21, 2010. On July 22, 2010, The-Dream's official website posted a sneak peek of the official music video for "Turnt Out".

Love King was originally scheduled for a December 2009 release. On September 26, 2009, Rap-Up reported that the album had been pushed back to 2010 release due to The-Dream's busy personal life. Pushed back from May 2010, the album was released June 29, 2010, through The-Dream's imprint label Radio Killa Records and Def Jam Recordings.

In its first week of release, Love King debuted at number four on the Billboard 200 albums chart and sold 58,000 copies. It also entered at number three on Billboard's Top R&B/Hip-Hop Albums. In its second week, the album fell to number 12 on the Billboard 200 and sold 23,000 copies. It moved to number 30 on the chart and sold 11,600 copies in its third week. The album did not chart outside the United States.

== Critical reception ==
Love King ratings
Aggregate scores
Source	Rating
AnyDecentMusic?	7.3/10
Metacritic	79/100
Review scores
Source	Rating
AllMusic	4/5 stars
The A.V. Club	B+
Entertainment Weekly	B
The Guardian	4/5 stars
Los Angeles Times	3/4 stars
Pitchfork	8.6/10
Rolling Stone	3/5 stars
Slant Magazine	4/5 stars
Spin	8/10
Urb	4/5 stars

Love King was met with generally positive reviews. At Metacritic, which assigns a normalized rating out of 100 to reviews from professional publications, the album received an average score of 79, based on 21 reviews. Aggregator AnyDecentMusic? gave it 7.8 out of 10, based on their assessment of the critical consensus.

Reviewing in June 2010, Los Angeles Times critic Jeff Weiss said The-Dream "manages to put a fresher spin on tired tropes". Rob Harvilla from The Village Voice credited him for "taking objectively terrible ideas—getting emotionally involved with this guy, for example, given his penchant for 'Patrónin'' and general sexual profligacy—and making them seem like brilliant ideas". The National's Alex Macpherson felt that he has an "apparent inability to separate the sublime from the ridiculous" and his competence as a musician: "He covers all bases, and erodes the differences between them". Michael Cragg of The Guardian said that "Love King doesn't win points for subtlety but, as an example of a producer at the top of his game, it's second to none". AllMusic's Andy Kellman felt that the album's flaws are transcended by "his way with a melody, an outrageous line, and an exquisitely adroit rhythm, all components in his immense crazy-quilt song cycle". BBC Online's Mike Diver called the production "superb" and wrote that it "ensures almost every track here is a brilliant earworm of an arrangement". Slant Magazine's Eric Henderson said that, like Prince, The-Dream makes "minimalism expansive" and elaborated on how the influence of Prince in The-Dream's music continues "blossoming in unexpected ways":

The intelligence of his production (not limited to but including two 'versions' of 'Sex Intelligent'), the sometimes-janky/sometimes-'brilliant wordplay, the complexity of his eroticism all emerge from Love King in holistic fashion. Here is The-Dream touching down in the same way Prince did with 1999. Like that sprawling double album, Love King's journey through the secret life of ass dares to meander, to free associate between tracks, to show just how a little can go a long way.

Some reviewers were more reserved in their appraisals. Ben Ratliff of The New York Times applauded The-Dream's "modern" musical approach and "small-scale epiphanies" in the lyrics, but felt that the album "doesn't transcend its highest individual moments". Rolling Stone writer Christian Hoard described it as "the soul-music equivalent of Dream's beloved Patrón: Not exactly eccentric, but finely crafted and intoxicating". Uncut magazine wrote that The-Dream's "relentless sex-pestering ultimately becomes tiresome but his music can often be magnificent: an aural pavlova of sugar-spun synths and ambrosial harmonies." MSN Music's Robert Christgau gave the album a two-star honorable mention, indicating a "likable effort consumers attuned to its overriding aesthetic or individual vision may well enjoy." He cited "Florida University" and "Sex Intelligent" as highlights and quipped, "We know this trickster is 'the last romantic' because, in the very same song, he tells his babydoll to present 'panties to the side'".

=== Year-end rankings ===
Pitchfork ranked the album number 30 on its list of the Top 50 Albums of 2010. New York writer Nitsuh Abebe placed it at number two on his year-end albums list, commending The-Dream's "down-to-earth R&B". August Brown of the Los Angeles Times ranked the album number nine on her year-end list and stated, "What makes Love King the R&B album of the year is the vulnerability that seeps between every glittering, mirrored edge of its production. [...] He's desperate, he's brazen, he's needy. And he's telling the truth." Rob Harvilla of The Village Voice named Love King the best album of 2010.

== Track listing ==
Love King standard edition
No.	Title	Writer(s)	Producer(s)	Length
1.	"Love King"	Terius Nash; Carlos McKinney	Los Da Mystro; The-Dream	4:11
2.	"Make Up Bag" (featuring T.I.)	Nash; Clifford Harris, Jr.	The-Dream	4:43
3.	"F.I.L.A."	Nash	The-Dream	4:11
4.	"Sex Intelligent"	Nash	The-Dream	5:10
5.	"Sex Intelligent (Remix)"	Nash	The-Dream	4:02
6.	"Yamaha"	Nash; McKinney	Los Da Mystro; The-Dream	4:55
7.	"Nikki Part 2"	Nash; McKinney	Los Da Mystro; The-Dream	2:41
8.	"Abyss"	Nash; McKinney	Los Da Mystro; The-Dream	4:38
9.	"Panties to the Side"	Nash; Christopher "Tricky" Stewart	Stewart; The-Dream	4:06
10.	"Turnt Out"	Nash; McKinney	Los Da Mystro; The-Dream	4:25
11.	"February Love"	Nash	The-Dream	6:15
12.	"Florida University"	Nash; McKinney	Los Da Mystro; The-Dream	5:27

Deluxe edition (bonus tracks)
No.	Title	Writer(s)	Producer(s)	Length
13.	"Veteran"	Nash; McKinney	Los Da Mystro; The-Dream	4:54
14.	"Priceless"	Nash; McKinney	Los Da Mystro; The-Dream	6:04
15.	"Take Care of Me"	Nash	The-Dream	5:39
16.	"All Black Everything"	Nash	The-Dream	3:53
17.	"Sorry"	Nash	The-Dream	3:40

== Personnel ==
Credits for Love King adapted from AllMusic.

- Lee Blaske – strings
- Los DaMystro – producer
- Steven Dennis – assistant engineer
- Brian Gardner – mastering
- Mark Gray – assistant engineer, mixing assistant
- Jaycen Joshua – mixing
- JP Robinson – art direction, design
- Giancarlo Lino – mixing assistant
- Tai Linzie – photography, art coordinator
- Pamela Littky – photography
- Ian Mercel – assistant engineer
- Terius "The-Dream" Nash – producer, executive producer, stylist
- Scott Naughton – engineer
- Luis Navarro – assistant engineer
- Dave Pensado – mixing
- Antonio "L.A." Reid – executive producer
- Melissa Santiago – executive coordinator
- Jason Sherwood – assistant engineer
- Chris Stanford – cover photo
- C. "Tricky" Stewart – keyboards, programming, producer
- Crystal Streets – stylist
- Brian "B-Luv" Thomas – engineer
- Pat Thrall – guitar, engineer, production engineer
- Kristen Yiengst – photography, art coordinator

== Charts ==
Chart performance for Love King
Chart (2010)	Peak position
US Billboard 200	4
US Top R&B/Hip-Hop Albums (Billboard)	3

== See also ==
- Song cycle
