= Lyric (group) =

R&B musical group

- Genres: R&B
- Years active: 2001–2003
- Label: J Records
- Members: Thema; Fendi; Jackie
- Website: Official MySpace Profile

Lyric was an American R&B girl group, which comprised Brooklyn native, Farrah "Fendi" Fleurimond, Los Angeles native Jackie (a.k.a. Baby J), and Detroit native Thema "Tayma Loren" McKinney. They would later be recognized as the first female trio to be signed by Clive Davis to his J Records imprint.

== Background ==
The group recorded a self-titled debut album that was scheduled to be released in November 5, 2002. The album was set to feature production from Hennessy, Kenny Whitehead, Steve Estiverne, Jack Knight and Thema's brother Carlos "Pryceless" McKinney. The debut yielded four singles ("Young & Sexy", "Episode", "Hot & Tipsy" and "Little Did You Know") before its cancellation.

In 2003, the trio attended the Grammy Week Songwriters luncheon with Patti LaBelle, before their disbandment and exit from J Records.

== Discography ==
=== Singles ===
Title	Year	Peak chart positions		Album
Title	Year	US 100	US R&B	Album
"Young & Sexy" (featuring Loon)	2002	—	79	Lyric
"Episode" (featuring Shells)	2002	—	—	Lyric
"Hot & Tipsy"	2003	—	—	Lyric
"Little Did You Know"	2003	—	—	Lyric
