= Walkin' on the Moon =

Single by The-Dream featuring Kanye West

from the album Love vs. Money
- Released: April 28, 2009
- Recorded: 2008
- Genre: Synthpop; R&B
- Length: 4:15 (album version); 4:02 (no intro radio edit)
- Label: Radio Killa; Def Jam
- Songwriters: Terius Nash; Kanye West
- Producers: L.O.S. Da Maestro; Kanye West

The-Dream singles chronology
| "My Love" (2009) | "Walkin' on the Moon" (2009) | "Throw It in the Bag" (2009) |

Kanye West singles chronology
| "Paranoid" (2009) | "Walkin' on the Moon" (2009) | "Maybach Music 2" (2009) |

"Walkin' on the Moon" is the third single by The-Dream from his second album Love vs. Money. The song features rapper Kanye West.

== Critical reception ==
Billboard magazine gave the song a positive review, saying: "The third single from the-Dream's critically acclaimed album "Love vs. Money" finds the R&B artist tipping his hat to Michael Jackson, in a futuristic way. Kicking into a techno beat, the-Dream crafts a melodic pop tune that manages to fit nicely into the current uptempo R&B trend, while creating some new sonics of its own. With MJ-imitated "woo-hoo's"; a clever, flirtatious rap interlude from Kanye West; and romantic lyrics throughout, this could be the summer anthem for young lovers everywhere".

== Music video ==
The video was premiered on May 20, 2009, at a Def Jam event. On May 27, 2009, the video was premiered on 106 & Park. The video was directed by Hype Williams. The video doubles as a homage to Michael Jackson and Janet Jackson's hit 1995 music video, "Scream".

The video ranked at #71 on BET's Notarized: Top 100 Videos of 2009 countdown.

== Charts ==
| Chart (2009) | Peak position |
|---|---|
| US Billboard Hot 100 | 87 |
| US Hot R&B/Hip-Hop Songs (Billboard) | 38 |
| US Pop 100 (Billboard) | 74 |
| US Rhythmic Airplay (Billboard) | 19 |
