= Dear Jayne =

American R&B/pop music group

- Origin: Los Angeles, California; Cocoa Beach, Florida; Philadelphia, Pennsylvania
- Genres: R&B, pop
- Years active: 2007–2009
- Labels: Music Line Group, Capitol
- Past members: Ashley; Jasmine; Emori; Lindsey

Dear Jayne was an American R&B/pop trio from Atlanta, Georgia. Their debut album, Voice Message, was originally scheduled to be released in March 2008 but has been canceled indefinitely. One single scheduled to be on the album, "Rain", broke onto the Billboard Hot R&B/Hip-Hop Songs chart, peaking at number 99.

== History ==
Based in Atlanta, the trio consists of Ashley (22), Jasminen (22), and Lindsey (19). The group was assembled by Anthony Tate, a manager and producer who also worked with Ciara, Teairra Mari and J. Holiday. Ashley is from Los Angeles' Crenshaw district; Jasmine is from Cocoa Beach, Florida; Lindsey is from Atlanta's College Park district. The group's lead single, "Rain", was produced by Carlos McKinney, who previously worked on J. Holiday's "Bed"; the single reached the Billboard R&B charts in January 2008. In on report it was described as an answer record to Rihanna's "Umbrella". Lindsey has now left the group and has been replaced by singer Emori Campbell.

== Discography ==
=== Singles ===
Year	Title	Chart positions		Album
Year	Title	U.S.	U.S. R&B	Album
2007	"Talkin' 'Bout Himself"	—	—	Voice Message
2007	"Rain"	—	99	Voice Message
