= Make Up Bag =

Single by The-Dream featuring T.I.

from the album Love King
- Released: June 8, 2010
- Recorded: 2009–2010
- Genre: R&B; hip hop
- Length: 4:57
- Label: Radio Killa; Def Jam
- Songwriters: Terius Nash; Clifford Harris Jr.
- Producer: The-Dream

The-Dream singles chronology
"Love King" (2010)	"Make Up Bag" (2010)	"Turnt Out" (2010)

T.I. singles chronology
"Got Your Back" (2010)	"Make Up Bag" (2010)	"Fancy" (2010)

"Make Up Bag" is the second single by American R&B artist The-Dream from his third studio album Love King. The song was officially released as a single on June 8, 2010, to the iTunes Store. It features rapper T.I.

== Music video ==
The Little X-directed music video premiered on BET's 106 & Park on June 3, 2010. Actor Jason Weaver appears in the video, as does model Selita Ebanks, who lip-synchs to a recording of the song Why Don't You Do Right?.

== Charts ==
Chart (2010)	Peak position
U.S. Billboard Hot R&B/Hip-Hop Songs	33

== Radio and release information ==
=== Radio adds ===
Country	Date	Format
United States	May 11, 2010	Urban radio
United States	June 1, 2010	Rhythmic radio

=== Purchaseable release ===
Country	Date	Format	Label
United States	June 8, 2010	Digital download	Island Def Jam
