= Karina Pasian =

American singer

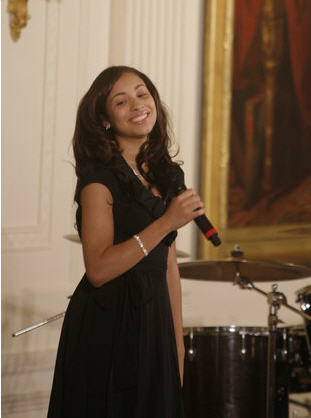
- Pasian at the White House in 2007

Background information
- Born: July 18, 1991 (age 35)
- Origin: New York City, U.S.
- Genres: R&B; pop
- Occupations: Singer; songwriter; pianist
- Years active: 2003–present
- Labels: KPasa; VY; Def Jam
- Website: www.instagram.com/karinapasian

Karina Pasian (born July 18, 1991) is an American singer, songwriter, and pianist.

== Life and career ==
Karina Pasian was born in New York City and is of mixed Dominican and Armenian descent. She grew up in Washington Heights, Manhattan.

Her first language was Russian, and she can sing in six other languages, including English, Spanish, Italian, Arabic, Turkish, and French. Growing up in a musical family, she first began taking piano lessons at the age of three from her babysitter, and began classical piano training while in kindergarten. She began working with a vocal coach at the age of eight, and attended the Professional Performing Arts School in New York City along with Taylor Momsen and Mark Indelicato.

In 2003, Pasian met Quincy Jones, who invited her and her family to his home in Bel Air, California. Soon after this, Pasian performed and won on Star Search. She also performed at Quincy Jones' We Are The Future concert in Rome. On June 22, 2007, Pasian performed at the White House for President George W. Bush, in celebration of Black Music Month, making her the first person of Dominican descent to perform there.

Pasian became the subject of a bidding war, when she was 13, between three major record labels: Def Jam, Interscope, and Bad Boy Records. She chose Def Jam in 2006. Her first album First Love was released on August 19, 2008. The first single was "16 @ War" which received some moderate airplay on Urban radio and BET. The album's second single, "Can't Find the Words" was more successful, charting at #88 on the Billboard Hot R&B/Hip Hop Singles chart. Later that year, the album received a nomination for a Grammy Award in the category of "Best Contemporary R&B."

Following her Grammy nomination, she did some touring in addition to recording covers on her YouTube channel. A digital single "Halo" (a cover of Beyoncé's hit single) was released in 2009. Additionally, she recorded a cover of Brandy's hit single "Brokenhearted" with R&B singer Sammie the following year. It was never released until 2011, that Pasian released new material, with an EP titled Trips to Venus EP, Vol. 1 – Holiday Edition on December 12. It was led by the single "Perfectly Different" in addition to a holiday single "The Christmas Song" released that same month.

In 2012, Pasian collaborated with Skye Townsend and Chris O'Bannon on the single "Go Fish" which resulted in a music video shot and directed by Robert Townsend in Los Angeles, California.

The following year, she released the digital single "Fall In Love Again", which was to lead off her next EP Trips to Venus EP, Vol. 2, which was slated for release but then pulled. A "Special Edition" of Vol. 1 was later released to iTunes and other digital services on April 29, 2014, which removed "The Christmas Song" and included an acoustic version of her song "Slow Motion", which appeared on her debut. Later that year, she released a digital single "Solitaire" independently.

In 2015, she signed with Universal Music Classics and released the single/video "Love Right Next to You" which received dance remixes in 2016. It's the lead single off her forthcoming EP Parallel World.

In 2020, she released her album "Something Warm To Wear"

In 2021 Pasian took part in the 8th season of the TV talent show La Voz, Spanish version of The Voice (American TV series). Her coach was Alejandro Sanz. Coincidentally, Pasian had worked as a singer in the Sanz's band during a number of tours. Karina Pasian was one of the four singers who performed in the final programme in December 2021, but not the winner.

In 2023 Pasian got the Singing role of Princess Nefer in the Warner Bros. film "Mummies".

In 2025, she was chosen to sing the U.S. National Anthem at NFL's first ever match in Spain, when the Miami Dolphins beat the Washington Commanders at Santiago Bernabéu Stadium in Madrid.

== Filmography ==
Year	Title	Role	Notes
2023	Mummies	Princess Nefer	Voice (Singing)

== Discography ==
=== Albums ===
Title	Album details	Peak chart positions		Sales
Title	Album details	US	US R&B	Sales
First Love	Released: August 19, 2008; Label: Def Jam; Format: CD, digital download	57	11	US: 28,408

=== EPs ===
Title	Album details	Peak chart positions		Sales
Title	Album details	US	US R&B	Sales
Trips to Venus	Released: December 12, 2011; Rereleased: April 29, 2014; Label: VY Records, LLC; Format: digital download	—	—	
Interlude	Released: November 17, 2017; Label: KPasa Music; Format: digital download	—	—	
Something Warm to Wear	Released: December 19, 2020; Label: KPasa Music; Format: digital download	—	—	

=== Singles ===
Title	Year	Peak chart positions	Album
Title	Year	US R&B	Album
"16 @ War"	2008	51	First Love
"Can't Find the Words"	2008	88	First Love
"Halo"	2009	—	Non-album singles
"America the Beautiful"	2011	—	Non-album singles
"The Christmas Song"	2011	—	Trips to Venus
"Perfectly Different"	2011	—	Trips to Venus
"Fall In Love Again"	2013	—	Non-album single
"Solitaire"	2014	—	Interlude
"Love Right Next to You"	2015	—	Non-album single
"Teacher"	2017	—	Interlude
"Something Warm to Wear"	2020	—	Something Warm to Wear
"Too Young to Be Sane"	2020	—	Something Warm to Wear
"Every Moment"	2020	—	Something Warm to Wear
"Mejor" (with Los Acústicos & Riki Rivera)	2022	—	Non-album singles
"Sangre Española" (with Los Acústicos & Riki Rivera)	2022	—	Non-album singles
"Sola (En Barcelona)"	2023	—	Non-album singles
"Vacaciones"	2023	—	Non-album singles

=== Other charted songs ===
Title	Year	Peak chart positions	Sales	Album
Title	Year	KOR	Sales	Album
"Slow Motion"	2008	1	KOR: 2,134,102	First Love
