= The-Dream =

American singer (born 1977)

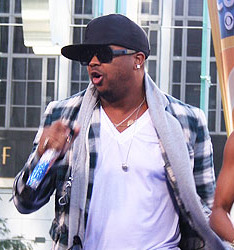
- The-Dream performing in 2008
- Born: Terius Youngdell Nash; September 20, 1977 (age 49); Rockingham, North Carolina, U.S.
- Occupations: Singer; songwriter; record producer
- Years active: 1995–present
- Works: Discography; production
- Spouses: Nivea (m. 2004; div. 2008) Christina Milian (m. 2009; div. 2011) LaLonne Martinez (m. 2014)
- Children: 9
- Awards: Full list
- Musical career
- Origin: Atlanta, Georgia, U.S.
- Genres: R&B; pop; hip-hop
- Labels: Radio Killa; Roc Nation; Def Jam; Capitol; Republic
- Website: radiokillarecords.com

Terius Gesteelde-Diamant (né Youngdell Nash; born September 20, 1977), known professionally as The-Dream, is an American singer, songwriter, and record producer. He has written or co-produced songs for artists in R&B and hip-hop, often in tandem with production partner Tricky Stewart. Beginning with I Am... Sasha Fierce (2008), he is credited on each of American singer Beyoncé's subsequent albums.

His co-writing credits include "Me Against the Music" (2003) for Britney Spears, "Ride" (2010) for Ciara, "Umbrella" (2007) for Rihanna, "Single Ladies (Put a Ring on It)" (2008), "Cuff It" (2022), "Break My Soul" (2022) and "Partition" (2013) for Beyoncé, "Touch My Body" (2008) for Mariah Carey, "16 @ War" for Karina Pasian (2008), "Baby" (2010) for Justin Bieber, "All of the Lights" (2010) for Kanye West, "No Church in the Wild" (2013) for Jay-Z and Kanye West and "Savage (Remix)" (2020) for Megan Thee Stallion. His work has earned him eight Grammy Awards from 21 nominations—including an inaugural nomination for Songwriter of the Year at the 65th Annual Grammy Awards.

Following the success of "Umbrella", he signed with Def Jam Recordings as a recording artist to release five studio albums: Love/Hate (2007), Love vs. Money (2009), Love King (2010), 1977 (2011) and IV Play (2013). The former two albums yielded the Billboard Hot 100-top 20 singles "Shawty Is a 10" (featuring Fabolous) and "Rockin' That Shit", respectively. Through his own label, Radio Killa Records, he released the triple album Ménage à Trois: Sextape Vol. 1, 2, 3 (2018) and Sextape 4 (2020).

== Early life ==
Terius Nash was born on September 20, 1977, in Rockingham, North Carolina. He moved with his mother to Atlanta, Georgia, when he was two years old. After learning to play trumpet in elementary school, Nash learned how to play the drums and guitar. His mother died in 1992 when Nash was fifteen years old, an event which would inspire him to write songs. He states that the death of his mother gave him a "soft spot" for women, to which he credits his desire to write songs about female empowerment such as Rihanna's "Umbrella". He moved in with his grandfather, a concrete mason who instilled a strong work ethic in Nash. Of his grandfather, Nash recalls "He came out of a bad time for blacks in the South, but even though we lived in the hood, we had a boat, some cars and a house that was paid for. So I've always had a different outlook on life. There's nothing I can't do."

== Music career ==
=== 2001–2007: Beginnings ===
Nash met R&B producer Laney Stewart in 2001 who helped him get a publishing deal after Nash wrote "Everything" for B2K's third album Pandemonium!. Under the pen name The-Dream, Nash began writing lyrics for popular artists. He co-wrote Britney Spears' song "Me Against the Music" from her album In the Zone. He spent two years working on Nivea's second album Complicated, which he executive produced, and continued to write and produce with Christopher "Tricky" Stewart, Laney's brother, which led to Rihanna's 2007 hit "Umbrella". "Umbrella" was nominated for Song of the Year at the 2008 Grammy Awards.

=== 2008–2010: The Love trilogy ===
In 2007, Nash signed a record contract with Def Jam Recordings and began working on his debut studio album Love/Hate. The album was produced by The-Dream, his production partner Tricky Stewart, and Los Da Mystro, and featured Fabolous and Rihanna. The album was written and recorded in eight days with twelve tracks making the final cut. Released December 11, 2007, on The-Dream's Def Jam imprint Radio Killa Records, the album featured the singles "Shawty Is a 10", "Falsetto" and "I Luv Your Girl" and received generally positive reviews from critics, as Rolling Stone called it "one of the most likable R&B records of the year" and UrbanMusicReviews.com said that the singer had "hit a home run". In June 2008, The-Dream was named Best New Artist at the BET Awards.

Nash wrote and produced Beyoncé's "Single Ladies (Put a Ring on It)", which was included on her third studio album I Am... Sasha Fierce and released in 2008. The song went on to win the Grammy Award for Song of the Year and Best R&B Song, becoming the first career wins at the Grammys for The-Dream.

On March 10, 2009, The-Dream released his second album Love vs. Money. He re-teamed with Tricky Stewart, who produced most of the tracks on the album, and Los Da Mystro. The album featured Mariah Carey, Kanye West, and Lil Jon and featured the singles "Rockin' That Shit", "Walkin' on the Moon" and "Sweat It Out". Upon its release, the album received general acclaim from most music critics, based on an aggregate score of 83/100 from Metacritic and it was more commercially successful than its predecessor, debuting at number two on the Billboard 200.

During the making of Love King, he recorded a song with T-Pain and expressed that he would like to make a collaborative album with Kanye West in the future. In January 2010, The-Dream stated he was finished recording the album and he called it the best of his three albums. The album was released on June 29, 2010. Before the album's release, The-Dream announced that Love King will be his last solo album. Once again produced by The-Dream, Christopher "Tricky" Stewart, and Los Da Mystro, the album spawned the singles "Love King" and "Make Up Bag". Despite positive reviews from critics, the album was less commercially successful than Love vs. Money, and debuted at number four on the Billboard 200.

=== 2011–2014: 1977 and IV Play ===
On the Love King track "Sex Intelligent (Remix)", The-Dream sang that he would release a follow-up album titled Love Affair on June 7, 2011. On that intended release date, The-Dream released a medley of two new songs titled "Body Work / Fuck My Brains Out" as a free download followed by an album titled 1977 on August 31, 2011, also as a free download. Def Jam Recordings released 1977 commercially on December 18, 2012, with a modified track list. Love Affair was delayed repeatedly and the name was changed to The Love, IV, Love IV: Diary of a Madman, Love IV MMXII, and finally IV Play. In the nearly three years between Love King and IV Play, The-Dream released the singles "Roc" and "Dope Bitch", which were not included on the final track list for IV Play.

IV Play was released on May 28, 2013. The album features guest appearances from Jay-Z, Big Sean, Pusha T, Beyoncé, 2 Chainz, Kelly Rowland, Gary Clark Jr. and Fabolous and the singles "Slow It Down" and "IV Play". On January 8, 2014, he revealed that he had left Def Jam Recordings and was independent. However, as of 2014, he was listed as being on the artist roster of major label Capitol Records.

=== 2015–17: Royalty: The Prequel (EP), Love You to Death EP and Love Affair ===
In the summer of 2014, The-Dream released his first free mixtape called Royalty: The Prequel (EP). The mixtape consisted of seven songs total, with hit songs "Pimp C Lives" and "Outkast". He followed with "Fruition" and "That's My Shit" to further introduce his new style of music and his upcoming album, Crown Jewel. Because of complications the album was split into two EPs. Crown was released May 3, 2015. Jewel will be released in the future after the transition to new management. In May 2016, The-Dream uploaded a video to Instagram, and in the description of the video he told he will continue "The Love" series, and his next project will be called "Love Affair" as he said at 2010 in the lyrics of the song "Sex Intelligent (Remix)". On December 9, he released "Love You to Death EP". On Instagram, The-Dream commented to fans that "Love Affair" will be released in March 2017. On February 28, The-Dream featured on a track released by Kanye West on his SoundCloud, entitled "Bed Yeezy Season 5 (ft. The-Dream)".

=== 2018–present: Sextape series ===
The-Dream released an album titled Ménage à Trois: Sextape Vol. 1, 2, 3 in December 2018, and another album titled Sextape 4 in April 2020. After a hiatus, The-Dream began a comeback in 2026, starting with "Bring That Body," as well as collabs with T.I. and Usher.

== Production and songwriting ==
In addition to his work with Nivea and Rihanna, Nash has written and produced songs for many other R&B, hip-hop, and pop artists, including J. Holiday, Usher, Yung Joc, Jesse McCartney, Mariah Carey, Karina Pasian, Ciara, Brandy, Diddy, Mary J. Blige, B2K, Beyoncé, Kylie Minogue, Janet Jackson, and Tulisa. In 2009, The-Dream and Tricky Stewart co-wrote and produced the album How to Be a Lady: Volume 1 by the R&B girl group Electrik Red.

The-Dream has been a featured artist on singles by artists such as Plies, LL Cool J, Dear Jayne, Gym Class Heroes, Sterling Simms, Rick Ross, Fabolous, Jamie Foxx, and Snoop Dogg.

In early 2009, The-Dream began working with Christina Milian on her fourth studio album Elope, which led to her signing a joint-deal with Radio Killa Records. The-Dream said that when he was building his label, he went looking for Milian because he believed she was a talented singer. The singer confirmed that her second single would be a duet with The-Dream called "Supersonic". Elope was never released and the material she recorded with The-Dream was scrapped after her marriage to Nash ended.

In 2010, The-Dream was criticized for his cover of Aaliyah's song "One in a Million". Upon the release of the song, fans of Aaliyah voiced distaste for The-Dream's rendition on radio shows and blog sites.

== Influence ==
John Calvert of The Quietus writes that The-Dream's "stadium-R&B reinvented the genre as a mythological epic", citing it as an influence on Frank Ocean's 2012 song "Pyramids". AllMusic editor Andy Kellman writes that, with Carlos McKinney and Tricky Stewart, The-Dream "seized possession of [...] the belt for the electronic pop-R&B division, once held by innovators Leon Sylvers III, Kashif and Morrie Brown, Prince, Jam & Lewis, Teddy Riley, Timbaland and Missy Elliott, and the Neptunes".

== Personal life ==
The-Dream has nine children by four different women. After dating for six months, Nash married his girlfriend, Nivea in December 2004. Their daughter Navy Talia Nash was born on May 10, 2005, and their twin sons London Nash and Christian Nash on April 19, 2006. The-Dream filed for legal separation on December 10, 2007. Nash said that although he was in love with Nivea, his lack of experience in a family growing up meant he was "not taught how much more than love [it takes] to run a relationship. Like, 'cause love isn't just where it's gonna end. It can't start and stop with love. There has to be a certain amount of knowledge and patience that's acquired in order to keep it going and keep it straight, and I found out the hard way." On June 15, 2008, their divorce was finalized. Nash stated in an interview, "I decided to end it because I didn't want to take this person [Nivea] and treat them a certain way based on what I was changing into, based on being bitter." Nivea confirmed The-Dream wanted the divorce, not she: "It's not [mutual]. We're supposed to say that, but it's not true. It wasn't no mutual agreement, he wanted to do it, I didn't, but it's done. I'm dealing with it."

Nash began dating Christina Milian in early 2009 and she became pregnant. They were engaged in June 2009 and married on September 4, 2009, at the Little White Chapel in Las Vegas. Nash said in an interview that Nivea was still a good friend of his, and that she was also friends with Milian. Five months after their wedding, Nash filed divorce papers in Georgia on February 17, 2010. Their daughter, Violet Madison Nash, was born on February 26, 2010. On July 12, 2010, the couple announced their separation, after photos surfaced of Nash being intimate with his assistant. Their divorce was finalized on October 23, 2011.

In 2012, Nash briefly dated Lydia Nam, who gave birth to their son in 2013.

Nash began dating LaLonne Martinez in early 2014. They became engaged in May 2014 and married on July 3, 2014, at San Francisco City Hall. Together, they have four children: sons Heir Wolf Nash (May 8, 2015) and Lord Nash (August 2016); and daughters Maverick (August 2017) and Élysées Nash (May 6, 2019).

== Legal issues ==
Nash was arrested on May 7, 2014, on charges of felony assault and strangulation, reckless endangerment and child endangerment against his then-pregnant girlfriend Lydia Nam for his alleged actions on April 4, 2013, while they were staying at the Plaza Hotel in New York. Prosecutors dismissed charges at a brief appearance in Manhattan Criminal Court. "After a thorough investigation, we have determined that we cannot prove this case beyond a reasonable doubt", Prosecutor Jacqueline Cornell said.

On June 4, 2024, Nash was accused of rape, sexual battery, and sex trafficking by his former protégée, Chanaaz Mangroe, through a lawsuit filed in the United States District Court for the Central District of California. Nash denied her accusations in a statement to The New York Times, describing them as "untrue and defamatory."

== Discography ==
Studio albums

- Love/Hate (2007)
- Love vs. Money (2009)
- Love King (2010)
- 1977 (2011)
- IV Play (2013)
- Genesis (2017)
- Ménage à Trois: Sextape Vol. 1, 2, 3 (2018)
- Sextape 4 (2020)
- Love/Hate II (2026)

== Filmography ==
Year	Title	Type	Role	Notes
2017	Signed	Television	Himself	Season 1

== Awards and nominations ==
Year	Award	Category	Nominated work	Result
2007	Mobo Awards	Best Songwriter	"Bed" (songwriter)	Nominated
2008	American Music Awards	T-Mobile Breakthrough Artist	The-Dream	Nominated
2008	BET Awards	Best New Artist	The-Dream	Won
2008	Ozone Awards	Best R&B Artist	The-Dream	Nominated
2009	BET Awards	Best Male R&B Artist	The-Dream	Nominated
2009	BET Hip-Hop Awards	Viewer's Choice	"Throw It in the Bag" with Fabolous	Won
2022	Billboard Awards	Songwriter of the year	The-Dream	Won
2023	iHeart Radio Music Awards	Songwriter of the year	For his work on releases by Beyoncé, Brent Faiyaz and Pusha T	Won

=== Grammy Awards ===
The-Dream has been nominated twenty-one times for the Grammy Awards, winning nine of these nominations.

Year	Nominee / work	Award	Result
2008	"Umbrella" (as songwriter)	Song of the Year	Nominated
2010	"Single Ladies (Put a Ring on It)" (as songwriter)	Song of the Year	Won
2010	"Single Ladies (Put a Ring on It)" (as songwriter)	Best R&B Song	Won
2010	I Am... Sasha Fierce (as producer)	Album of the Year	Nominated
2012	"All of the Lights" (as songwriter)	Song of the Year	Nominated
2012	"All of the Lights" (as songwriter)	Best Rap Song	Won
2013	"No Church in the Wild" (with Jay-Z and Kanye West & Frank Ocean)	Best Rap/Sung Collaboration	Won
2013	"No Church in the Wild" (with Jay-Z and Kanye West & Frank Ocean)	Best Short Form Music Video	Nominated
2014	"Holy Grail" (as songwriter)	Best Rap Song	Nominated
2015	Beyoncé (as producer)	Album of the Year	Nominated
2017	"Ultralight Beam" (with Kanye West, Chance The Rapper, Kelly Price & Kirk Franklin)	Best Rap/Sung Performance	Nominated
2017	"Ultralight Beam" (with Kanye West, Chance The Rapper, Kelly Price & Kirk Franklin)	Best Rap Song	Nominated
2021	"Savage" (as songwriter)	Best Rap Song	Won
2023	Renaissance (As producer)	Best Dance/Electronic Album	Won
2023	Renaissance (As producer/songwriter)	Album of the Year	Nominated
2023	"Break My Soul" (As producer/songwriter)	Record of the Year	Nominated
2023	"Break My Soul" (As producer/songwriter)	Song of the Year	Nominated
2023	"Break My Soul" (As producer/songwriter)	Best Dance/Electronic Recording	Won
2023	"Cuff It" (as producer/songwriter)	Best R&B Song	Won
2023	"Virgo's Groove" (as producer/songwriter)	Best R&B Performance	Nominated
2023	Himself	Songwriter of the Year, Non-Classical	Nominated
2025	"Cowboy Carter" (As producer/songwriter)	Album of the Year	Won
