= Electrik Red =

American girl group

- Origin: Los Angeles, California, U.S.
- Genres: R&B; pop; electronic; hip hop
- Years active: 2005–2011
- Labels: Radio Killa; Def Jam
- Past members: Kyndra "Binkie" Reevey; Lesley Lewis; Naomi Allen; Sarah Rosete
- Website: Electrik Red official website

Electrik Red were an American R&B girl group, comprising Kyndra "Binkie" Reevey, Lesley Lewis, Naomi Allen, and Sarah Rosete. The members began their individual careers as backup dancers in New York City and Toronto. The group formed in 2005 and signed with Def Jam Recordings in 2008. Their music is mainly written and produced by songwriter The-Dream and his production partner Tricky Stewart.

== Career ==
Electrik Red is made up of two pairs of childhood friends: Reevey and Lewis from New York City, and Allen and Rosete from Toronto. While working as back-up dancers for Usher during his 2004 Confessions tour, Reevey and Lewis asked Rosete if she wanted to be a part of their girl group. Rosete agreed to join, but requested that they meet her best friend, Allen, who they "fell in love with" and invited to join as well. The group moved to Los Angeles, where they began working with different producers including Shannon "Slam" Lawrence and Rodney Jerkins. The quartet officially convened as Electrik Red in 2005.

The four group members continued to work as professional dancers, individually appearing in videos for Mariah Carey, Janet Jackson, Akon, Ludacris, and Chris Brown, and in the film Dreamgirls. After individually performing as dancers and models, they appeared together in Ciara's video for "Like a Boy"; Binkie and Lesley danced in Aaliyah's music videos to "More Than a Woman" and "Rock the Boat", the latter of which shoot ended with the death of Aaliyah in a plane crash. In late 2007, Allen and Rosete were cast in the video for The-Dream's single "Shawty Is a 10". Shakir Stewart, then the Executive Vice President of Def Jam Recordings, organized an audition for the group with label chairman L. A. Reid, and the group was signed to Def Jam on February 23, 2008. Shakir Stewart then organized a meeting for the group with The-Dream and Tricky Stewart, who cosigned Electrik Red to their Def Jam-affiliated label, Radio Killa. The-Dream and Tricky Stewart then became the executive producers for the group's debut album How to Be a Lady: Volume 1, which was released on May 26, 2009. The group explained the album title as a "play on the stereotype of what a lady is supposed to be, how she is supposed to act and what she is supposed to say. We're bringing a new age woman to the world." The group wanted to show that it was "okay to be different".

How to Be a Lady: Volume 1 spawned three singles: "Drink in My Cup", "So Good", and a remix of "So Good" featuring Lil Wayne. Music videos were filmed for "Drink in My Cup" and "Friend Lover," with both directed by Marc Klasfeld. Another video was shot with Lil Wayne for the "So Good" remix.

=== 2010–present ===
Electrik Red began recording a second album in early 2010, though that album has not yet appeared. The group premiered a new track at the E World Awards in Atlanta, Georgia, on January 27, 2010, titled "I'm That Chick". On February 3, 2010, a two-minute teaser sample of the track was released via YouTube and about a month later, the full track was released via the Twitter account of group member Lesley Lewis.

On January 22, 2011, Electrik Red announced an upcoming European tour via Twitter. On Valentine's Day February 14, 2011, Lewis premiered a one-minute teaser sample "Bra's and Panties" via YouTube. Later, Lewis confirmed their label would not allow them to release the song. The group then released "Africa (Put Cha Money On It)" which received positive reviews from fans. Naomi Allen was featured on the single "Take Me" by producer Kingdom on July 26, 2011. Near the end of 2011 Electrik Red remade the song "That's My Bitch" by rappers Jay-Z & Kanye West.

== Discography ==
=== Albums ===
- How to Be a Lady: Volume 1 (2009)

=== Singles ===
- "Drink in My Cup"
- "So Good"/(Remix featuring Lil' Wayne)

=== Videos ===
- "Electric City"/"Top Rankin'" (2006)
- "Drink In My Cup" (2008)
- "Friend Lover" (2009)
- "So Good" (Original) (2009)
- "So Good" (Remix) (featuring Lil Wayne) (2009)

The "So Good" remix video peaked at No. 6 on BET's '106 & Park'.

=== Unreleased tracks ===
- "Electric City"
- "On You" (Put It On Me)
- "Rush Into It"
- "Friend Zone"
- "Eye On You"
- "Blind"
- "Glamour Girl" (Produced By: Rodney "Darkchild" Jerkins)
- "Top Rankin"
- "Imma Cheat" (Christina Milian Demo)
- "Touch Me"
- "Africa (Put Your Money On It)"
- "I'm That Chick"
- "That's My Bitch (Remix)"
- "Black Chix" (Rucka Rucka Ali ft Electrik Red)

== Film ==
- Alvin and the Chipmunks – Binkie – Dancer
- Delirious – Binkie – Dancer No. 2
- Law & Order: Special Victims Unit- Season 3, Episode 4 "Rooftop" – Binkie – Tanya
- Step Up 2: The Streets – Binkie – West Coast Rider
- Dreamgirls – Lesley – Stepp Sister
- Just Jordan – Lesley – Britney
- Viva Laughlin – Lesley – Casino Dancer
- Cape Sin – Naomi – Friend
- From G's to Gents – Naomi – Writer/Producer
- Honey – Naomi – Miscellaneous Crew
- The Comebacks – Sarah – Fantasy Dancer
