= J. Holiday discography =

Discography

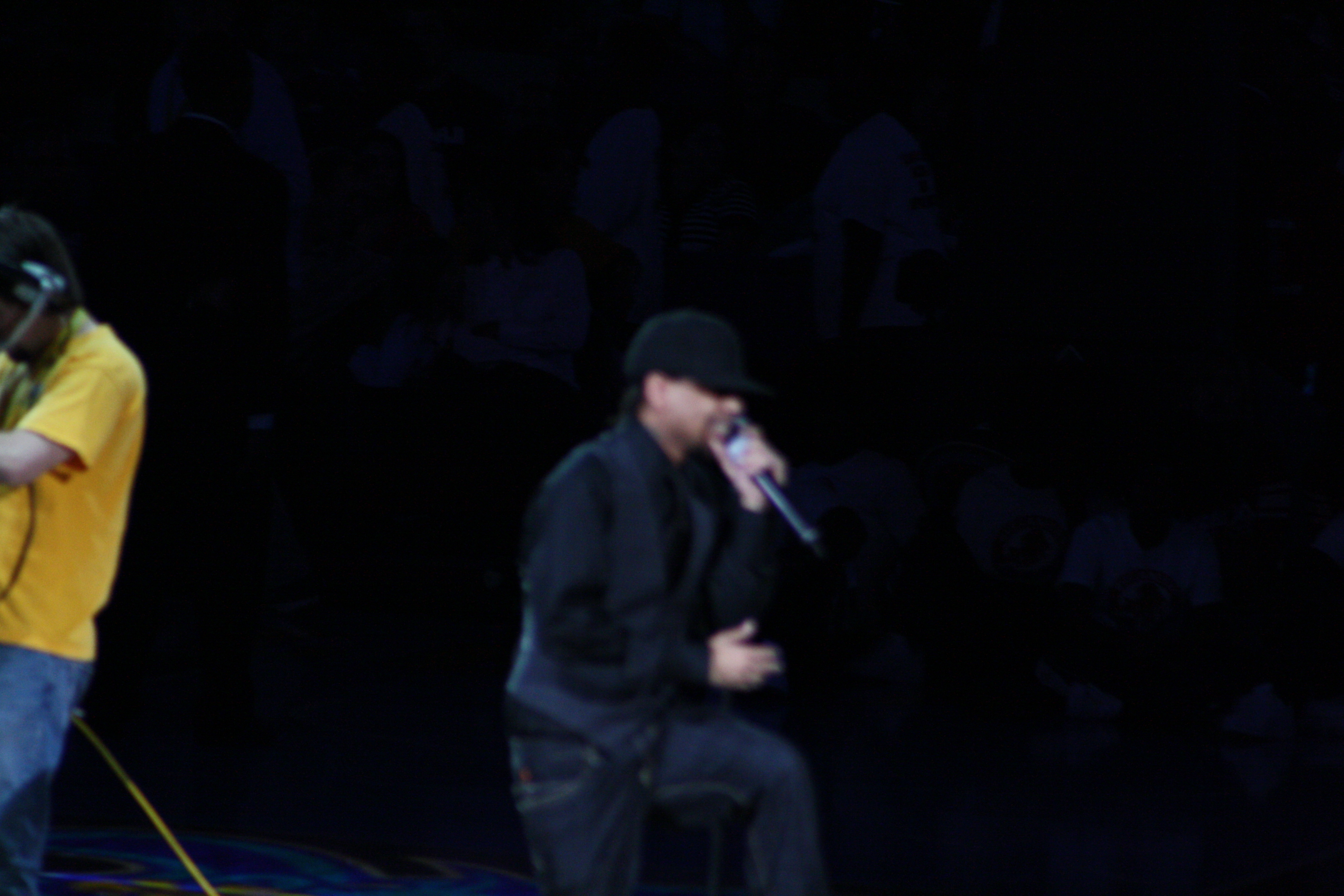
- J. Holiday in 2009
- Studio albums: 4
- Singles: 4
- Music videos: 4
- Mixtapes: 4
- Guest appearances: 19

The discography of J. Holiday, an American singer, consists of four studio albums, four mixtapes, five singles (including one as a featured performer) and five music videos.

== Albums ==
=== Studio albums ===
List of albums, with selected chart positions and certifications
Title	Album details	Peak chart positions				Certifications	Sales
Title	Album details	US	US R&B /HH	US R&B	JPN	Certifications	Sales
Back of My Lac'	Released: October 2, 2007; Label: Music Line, Capitol; Format: CD, LP, digital download	5	1	—	38	RIAA: Gold	
Round 2	Released: March 10, 2009; Label: Music Line, Capitol; Format: CD, digital download	4	2	—	54		
Guilty Conscience	Released: January 28, 2014; Label: Music Line, HMG, Central South Distribution; Format: CD, digital download	—	42	24	—		
Time	Released: February 7, 2022; Label: HMG, MilknSizz, Empire; Format: Digital download, streaming	—	—	—	—		
"—" denotes a recording that did not chart or was not released in that territory.

=== Mixtapes ===
List of mixtapes
Title	Album details
Baecation	Released: November 13, 2020; Label: X-Ray, Cleopatra; Format: CD, digital download, streaming

== Singles ==
=== As lead artist ===
List of singles, with selected chart positions and certifications, showing year released and album name
Title	Year	Peak chart positions							Certifications	Album
Title	Year	US	US Pop	US R&B	CAN	JPN	NZ	UK	Certifications	Album
"Be with Me"	2006	—	—	83	—	—	—	—		Back of My Lac'
"Bed"	2007	5	21	1	92	—	11	32	RIAA: Gold; BPI: Silver; MC: Gold (Ringtone)	Back of My Lac'
"Suffocate"	2007	18	—	2	—	—	—	—	RIAA: Gold	Back of My Lac'
"It's Yours"	2008	—^{[A]}	—	25	—	33	—	—		Round 2
"After We Fuck"	2013	—	—	—	—	—	—	—		Guilty Conscience
"Incredible"	2014	—	—	—	—	—	—	—		Guilty Conscience
"Where Are You Now"	2014	—	—	—	—	—	—	—		Guilty Conscience
"25 to Life"	2018	—	—	—	—	—	—	—		Time
"Petals	2019	—	—	—	—	—	—	—		Non-album single
"Feel Like"	2019	—	—	—	—	—	—	—		Time
"Baecation"	2020	—	—	—	—	—	—	—		Baecation
"Ride"	2021	—	—	—	—	—	—	—		Time
"Zero to Sixty"	2022	—	—	—	—	—	—	—		Time
"—" denotes a recording that did not chart or was not released in that territory.

=== As featured performer ===
List of singles, with selected chart positions, showing year released and album name
Title	Year	Peak chart positions			Album
Title	Year	US	US R&B	US Rap	Album
"I Won't Tell" (Fat Joe featuring J. Holiday)	2007	37	12	3	The Elephant in the Room

== Other charted songs ==
List of songs, with selected chart positions, showing year released and album name
Title	Year	Peak chart positions	Album
Title	Year	US R&B	Album
"Sign My Name"^{[B]}	2012	122	—N/a

== Guest appearances ==
List of non-single guest appearances, with other performing artists, showing year released and album name
Title	Year	Other artist(s)	Album
"Girlfriend's Fav MC"	2007	Mims	Music Is My Savior
"So Cold"	2007	Dee Boi	—N/a
"Goin' Home"	2007	Outlawz	The Lost Songs Vol. 2
"Rain" (Remix)	2008	Dear Jayne	Voice Message
"Gangsta"	2008	Young Bruh, Game	—N/a
"Touch Yo' Body"	2008	Young Lace	—N/a
"#1 Fan"	2008	Plies, Keyshia Cole	Definition of Real
"Relax"	2009	Chamillionaire	Venom
"Be My Hustla"	2009	Mims	Guilt
"Come On"	2009	2 Pistols, Lil Wayne	Arrogant
"Hood Famous"	2009	Mack 10	Soft White
"Hit For Days"	2009	Busta Rhymes	—N/a
"Take It Off"	2009	Lloyd, Nicki Minaj	Like Me: The Young Goldie EP
"Gonna Be Alright"	2010	Dolla	A Dolla And A Dream
"Club Full Of Hoes"	2010	Pastor Troy	—N/a
"Georgia Peach"	2010	Pastor Troy	King of Kings
"Yes Girl"	2010	Roscoe Dash	Ready Set Go!
"Ambitious Girl Part 2"	2011	Wale	The Eleven One Eleven Theory
"Can't Leave You Alone"	2012	Black Cobain	Cheers
"Imagine"	2012	2win	Imagine
"Goldmine"	2020	James Artissen	—N/a

== Music videos ==
Year	Title	Director	Artist(s)
As main performer
2006	"Be with Me"	Juwan Lee and Erik White	J. Holiday
2007	"Bed"	Jonathan Mannion	J. Holiday
2007	"Suffocate"	Jonathan Mannion	J. Holiday
2009	"It's Yours"	Jonathan Mannion	J. Holiday
2013	"After We"	Zach Wolfe	J. Holiday
2014	"Where Are You Now"	Barry Lares	J. Holiday
As featured performer
2007	"I Won't Tell"	Gil Green	Fat Joe featuring J. Holiday
2009	"Imagine"	G Visuals	2win featuring J. Holiday
2016	"Way Up"	Director Ace	Shayal featuring Tyler and J. Holiday

== Notes ==
- A "It's Yours" did not enter the Billboard Hot 100, but peaked at number 3 on the Bubbling Under Hot 100 Singles chart, which acts as a 25-song extension to the Hot 100.
- B "Sign My Name" did not enter the Hot R&B/Hip-Hop Songs chart, but peaked at number 22 on the Bubbling Under R&B/Hip-Hop Singles chart, which acts as a 25-song extension to the Hot R&B/Hip-Hop Songs chart.
