= Charlie Wilson discography =

It details Charlie Wilson's albums and singles, highlighting his R&B and soul career

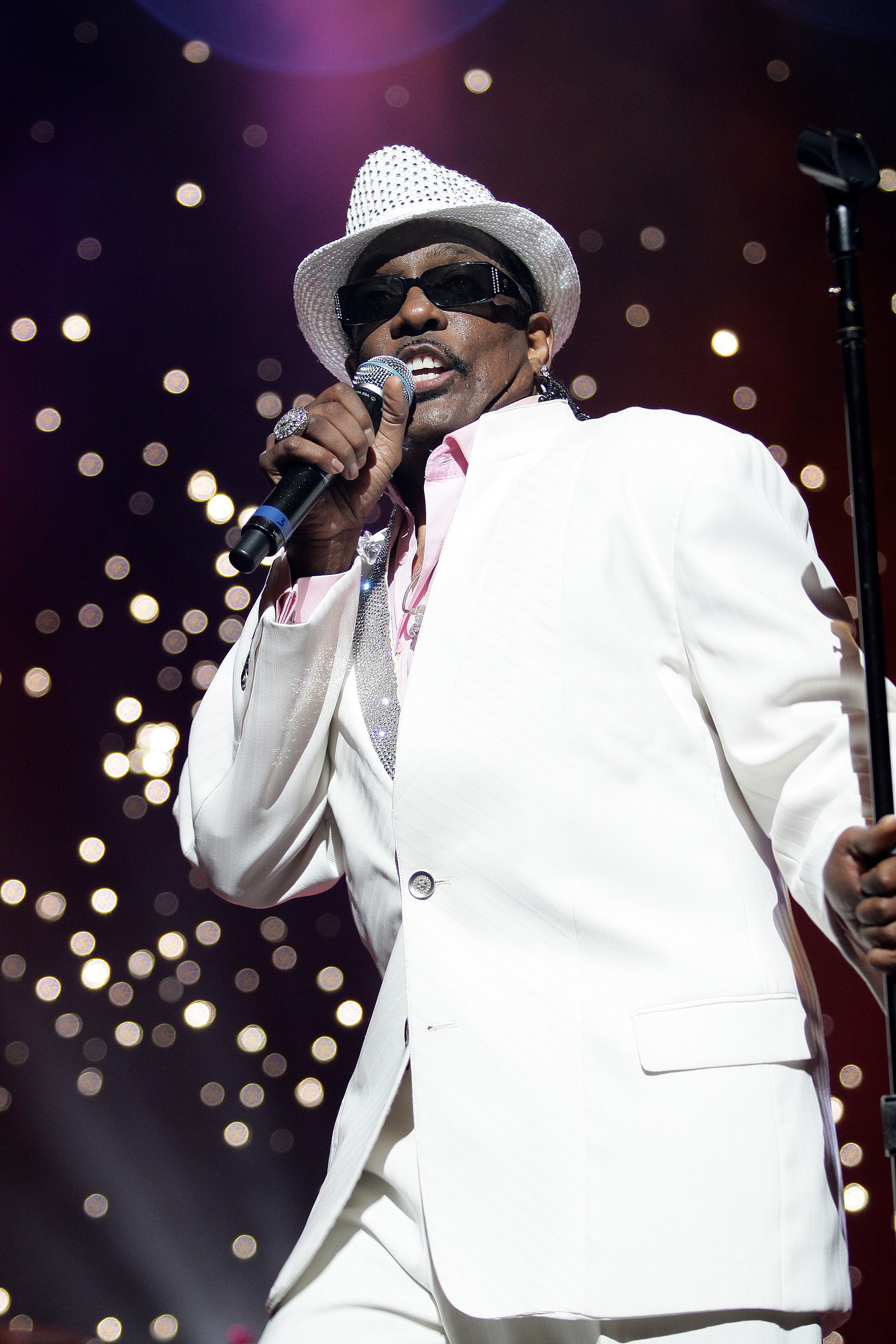
Wilson performing

This is the discography for American musician Charlie Wilson.

== Albums ==
Year	Title	Peak chart positions		Certifications
Year	Title	US	US R&B	Certifications
1992	You Turn My Life Around: Released: July 21, 1992; Label: Bon Ami Records / MCA; Format: CD, cassette	—	42	
2000	Bridging the Gap: Released: November 14, 2000; Label: Major Hits Records/ UMVD; Format: CD, cassette	152	30	
2005	Charlie, Last Name Wilson: Released: August 23, 2005; Label: P Music / Jive / Zomba; Format: CD, digital download	10	3	RIAA: Gold
2009	Uncle Charlie: Released: February 17, 2009; Label: P Music / Jive / Zomba; Format: CD, digital download	2	1	
2010	Just Charlie: Released: December 7, 2010; Label: P Music / Jive / Sony; Format: CD, digital download	19	6	
2013	Love, Charlie: Released: January 29, 2013; Label: P Music / RCA / Sony; Format: CD, digital download	4	1	
2015	Forever Charlie: Released: January 27, 2015; Label: P Music / RCA / Sony; Format: CD, digital download	17	2	
2017	In It to Win It: Released: February 17, 2017; Label: RCA; Format: CD, digital download	7	3	

== Singles ==
Year	Title	Chart positions			Album
Year	Title	Urban AC	US R&B/Hip-Hop	US Hot 100	Album
1992	"You Turn My Life Around"	—	78	—	You Turn My Life Around
1992	"Sprung on Me"	—	23	—	You Turn My Life Around
2000	"Without You"	2	26	—	Bridging the Gap
2000	"Big Pimpin'" (featuring Nate Dogg)	—	—	—	Bridging the Gap
2005	"Charlie, Last Name Wilson"	1	11	67	Charlie, Last Name Wilson
2005	"Magic"	2	27	125	Charlie, Last Name Wilson
2008	"Supa Sexy" (featuring T-Pain & Jamie Foxx)	10	53	—	Uncle Charlie
2009	"There Goes My Baby"	1	15	98	Uncle Charlie
2009	"Can't Live Without You"	2	19	—	Uncle Charlie
2010	"You Are"	1	13	103	Just Charlie
2011	"I Wanna Be Your Man" (featuring Fantasia)	23	74	—	Just Charlie
2011	"Life of the Party"	2	20	120	Just Charlie
2012	"My Love Is All I Have"	1	36	108	Love, Charlie
2013	"Turn Off the Lights"	10	32	—	Love, Charlie
2013	"I Still Have You"	14	40	—	Love, Charlie
2014	"Goodnight Kisses"	6	26	—	Forever Charlie
2016	"I'm Blessed" (featuring T.I.)	1	16	—	In It to Win It
2017	"Good Time"	20	—	—	In It to Win It
2017	"Chills"	1	21	—	In It to Win It
2020	"Forever Valentine"	1	— (Note: "Forever Valentine" did not enter the Hot R&B/Hip-Hop Songs, but peaked at number 19 on Hot R&B/Hip-Hop Airplay chart)	—	Non-Album singles
2020	"One I Got"	1	— (Note: "One I Got" did not enter the Hot R&B/Hip-Hop Songs, but peaked at number 13 on Hot R&B/Hip-Hop Airplay chart)	—	Non-Album singles
2020	"All of My Love" (featuring Smokey Robinson)	10	— (Note: "All Of My Love" did not enter the Hot R&B/Hip-Hop Songs, but peaked at number 39 on Hot R&B/Hip-Hop Airplay chart)	—	Non-Album singles
2023	"No Stoppin' Us" (featuring Babyface, K-Ci Hailey & Johnny Gill)	1	— (Note: "No Stoppin' Us" did not enter the Hot R&B/Hip-Hop Songs, but peaked at number 17 on Hot R&B/Hip-Hop Airplay chart)	—	Non-Album singles
2023	"Superman"	1	— (Note: "Superman" did not enter the Hot R&B/Hip-Hop Songs, but peaked at number 20 on Hot R&B/Hip-Hop Airplay chart)	—	Non-Album singles
2025	"Keep Me In Love"	1	— (Note: "Keep Me In Love" did not enter the Hot R&B/Hip-Hop Songs, but peaked at number 15 on Hot R&B/Hip-Hop Airplay chart)	—	Non-Album singles
"—" denotes releases that did not chart or were not released in that territory.

== Featured collaborations ==
Year	Song	Other artist(s)	Album	Label
2024	"River" (additional vocals)	¥$, Young Thug	Vultures 2	YZY
2024	A Song for Mom	Mustard, Ty Dolla Sign, Masego	Faith of a Mustard Seed	
2024	Mines	Mustard, Ty Dolla Sign, Future	Faith of a Mustard Seed	
2024	Attitude	Don Toliver, Cash Cobain	Hardstone Psycho	
2023	If I Had	Don Toliver	Love Sick	
2022	"Sweet Yamz (Remix)"	Fetty Wap, Ron Isley	N/A	RGF & 300
2021	"No Phony Love"	Nas	King's Disease II	Mass Appeal
2021	"Do What I Do"	Jam & Lewis	Jam & Lewis: Volume One	BMG
2021	“I'll Take You On”	Brockhampton	Roadrunner: New Light, New Machine	RCA
2020	"Back to You"	O.T. Genasis, Chris Brown	N/A	The Conglomerate & Atlantic
2020	"Roots"	Aminé, JID	Limbo	CLBN & Republic
2020	"Car #85"	Nas	King's Disease	Mass Appeal
2019	"Gucci Pajamas"	Guapdad 4000, Chance the Rapper	Dior Deposits	TWNSHP & Warner
2019	"Boyfriend"	Tyler, the Creator	IGOR	Sony
2019	"I Don't Love You Anymore"	Tyler, the Creator	IGOR	Sony
2019	"Earfquake"	Tyler, the Creator, Playboi Carti, Jessy Wilson	IGOR	Sony
2018	"No Mistakes"	Kanye West, Kid Cudi	ye	GOOD Music & Def Jam
2018	"No Pain"	DJDS, Khalid	Big Wave More Fire	Concord Loma Vista
2018	"One More Day"	Snoop Dogg	Bible of Love	RCA Inspiration
2017	"Dakota"	Aminé	Good for You	Republic
2017	"Turf"	Aminé	Good for You	Republic
2015	"Tiring Game"	John Newman	Revolve	Island
2015	"Fucking Young/Perfect"	Tyler, the Creator, Chaz Bundick, Syd, Kali Uchis	Cherry Bomb	Sony
2015	"Peaches N Cream"	Snoop Dogg	Bush	Columbia
2014	"Spend All My Time"	Marsha Ambrosius	Friends & Lovers	RCA
2013	"Bound 2"	Kanye West	Yeezus	Def Jam
2011	"More Than You'll Ever Know"	Boyz II Men	Twenty	MSM
2011	"That's My Bitch"	Kanye West, Jay-Z	Watch the Throne	Def Jam
2011	"Beautiful Dancer"	New Boyz	Too Cool to Care	Warner
2010	"See Me Now"	Kanye West, Beyoncé, Big Sean	My Beautiful Dark Twisted Fantasy	Def Jam
2010	"All of the Lights"	Kanye West	My Beautiful Dark Twisted Fantasy	Def Jam
2010	"Lost in the World"	Kanye West, Bon Iver	My Beautiful Dark Twisted Fantasy	Def Jam
2010	"Runaway"	Kanye West, Pusha T	My Beautiful Dark Twisted Fantasy	Def Jam
2010	"Monster"	Kanye West, Jay-Z, Nicki Minaj, Rick Ross, Bon Iver	My Beautiful Dark Twisted Fantasy	Def Jam
2010	"Lord, Lord, Lord"	Kanye West, Mos Def, Swizz Beatz, Raekwon	G.O.O.D. Friday Release	Def Jam
2010	"Good Friday"	Kanye West, Common, Pusha T, Kid Cudi, Big Sean	G.O.O.D. Friday Release	Def Jam
2009	"Download"	Lil' Kim, T-Pain	Hard Core	Queen Bee Entertainment
2008	"Snoop Dogg Is Out"	Snoop Dogg	Ego Trippin'	Geffen
2008	"Can't Say Goodbye"	Snoop Dogg	Ego Trippin'	Geffen
2007	"How Long Can it Last"	UGK	Underground Kingz	Jive
2007	"Quit Hatin' the South"	UGK	Underground Kingz	Jive
2006	"That Girl"	Pharrell	In My Mind	Interscope
2005	"Mi Casa"	The Notorious B.I.G.	Duets: The Final Chapter	Bad Boy
2005	"Crack Music"	Kanye West	Late Registration	Rock-A-Fella
2004	"Perfect"	Snoop Dogg	R&G (Rhythm & Gangsta): The Masterpiece	Geffen
2004	"Signs"	Snoop Dogg, Justin Timberlake	R&G (Rhythm & Gangsta): The Masterpiece	Geffen
2002	"You Got What I Want"	Snoop Dogg	Paid tha Cost to Be da Boss	Priority
2002	"Beautiful"	Snoop Dogg, Pharrell	Paid tha Cost to Be da Boss	Priority
2002	"One Way Street"	Avant	Ecstasy	MCA
1999	"Pretty Lady"	Mint Condition	Life's Aquarium	Elektra
1998	"Whatcha Wanna Do"	Mia X	Mama Drama	No Limit
1998	"Ghetto Fabulous"	Mystikal	Ghetto Fabulous	Jive
1998	"Show Me Love"	Snoop Dogg	Da Game Is to Be Sold, Not to Be Told	Priority
1997	"Off the Hook"	Snoop Doggy Dogg, Val Young, James DeBarge	Gridlock'd	Interscope
1996	"Snoop Bounce"	Snoop Doggy Dogg	Tha Doggfather	Death Row
1996	"Snoop's Upside Ya Head"	Snoop Doggy Dogg	Tha Doggfather	Death Row
1996	"Up Jump Tha Boogie"	Snoop Doggy Dogg	Tha Doggfather	Death Row
1996	"Groupie"	Snoop Doggy Dogg, 213, Tha Dogg Pound	Tha Doggfather	Death Row
1996	"Just Watching" (unreleased)	Snoop Doggy Dogg, 2Pac, Tha Dogg Pound	Tha Doggfather	Death Row
1994	"Stuff Like That"	Quincy Jones	Q's Jook Joint	Warner
1994	"Heaven's Girl"	Quincy Jones, R. Kelly, Ron Isley, Aaron Hall	Q's Jook Joint	Warner
1992	"Its Gonna Be Alright"	Aaron Hall	Boomerang	Arista
1991	"Spend a Little Time"	Keith Sweat	Keep It Comin'	Elektra
1989	"Revival"	Eurythmics	We Too Are One	RCA / Arista
1985	"Computer Love"	Zapp and Roger	The New Zapp IV U	Warner
1980	"I Ain't Gonna Stand for It"	Stevie Wonder	Hotter than July	Motown

== Production discography ==
List of production and non-performing songwriting credits for other artists (excluding guest appearances, interpolations, and samples)
Track(s)	Year	Credit	Artist(s)	Album
B2. "All Said and Done"	1976	Songwriter	The Surprise Sisters	The Surprise Sisters
4. "Take Your Time"	1988	Producer (with Pebbles)	Pebbles	Pebbles
6. "Mercedes Boy"	1988	Producer (with Pebbles)	Pebbles	Pebbles
6. "Revival"	1989	Songwriter	Eurythmics	We Too Are One
11. "Precious"	1989	Songwriter	Eurythmics	We Too Are One
1. "I Wanna Ride"	1989	Producer	Maniquin	Maniquin
2. "Bound 2"	2013	Songwriter	Kanye West	Yeezus
