= Travis Cherry =

American music producer

Travis Cherry is a two-time Grammy-nominated American music producer, musician and songwriter from Raleigh, North Carolina. He has worked with artists such as Bone Thugs and Harmony, Keith Sweat, Jennifer Lopez, Trina, Snoop Dogg, Charlie Wilson and J. Holiday. His work appears on the Gold-selling album Back of My Lac' by J. Holiday and on Jennifer Lopez's 2007 album Brave. He also appeared in Episode 3 of the first season of BET's TV show Keyshia Cole: The Way It Is.

== Education ==
Travis Cherry graduated from William G. Enloe GT/IB Center for the Humanities, Sciences, and the Arts in Raleigh, North Carolina. He also attended Louisburg College and St. Augustine's University.

== Awards and nominations ==
Grammy Awards
Year	Category	Genre	Title	Result
2008	Best Contemporary R&B Album	R&B	J. Holiday Back of My Lac'	Nominated
2008	Best Contemporary R&B Gospel Album	Gospel	Jason Champion Reflections	Nominated

== Film and TV appearances ==
=== 2006 ===
- Keyshia Cole: The Way It Is -Episode 3 (July 26) – originally aired on BET

=== 2008 ===
- Blaque in the House

=== 2009 ===
- Split Ends – Episode 1 (August 8) – "Hypnotic" by S0sy – aired on Style Network

=== 2017 ===
- Unsung- Case (singer) Episode (February 1) "Heaven" aired on TV One
- "Bobbi Kristina" - "Home" by Demetria McKinney aired on TV One (October 8)

=== 2018 ===
- "Merry Wish-mas" airing on TV One

=== 2021 ===
- "Christmas In My Heart" airing on Hallmark Channel

=== 2024 ===
- Unsung- Blaque Episode (April 7) aired on TV One

== Discography ==
=== 2000 ===
==== Scarface ====
- “F*ck Love (unreleased)”

=== 2006 ===
==== Charlie Wilson ====
- “Need A Wife (unreleased)”

=== 2007 ===
==== J. Holiday – Back of My Lac' ====
- "Come Here"
- "Bed" Remix feat Trina And Ja Rule

==== Jennifer Lopez – Brave (Jennifer Lopez album)Brave ====
- "Gotta Be There"
- "Gotta Be There" Remix feat J-Bo from the YoungBloodz and Michael Jackson

==== Bone Thugs-N-Harmony - "Strength And Loyalty" ====
- "Into The Future" (featuring Flesh-n-Bone)

==== Quan(rapper) ====
- “Fatal Attraction”

==== Keith Sweat ====
- “That's Just Me”
- “untitled”

=== 2008 ===
==== J. Holiday – Back of My Lac' (Deluxe Edition) ====
- "When You Get Home"

==== Jason Champion – Reflections ====
- "Father You" -credited as Engineer
- album nominated for a Grammy

==== Roy Jones Jr. – "HBO Promo" ====
- "Monsta" feat 3-D -for the Roy Jones JR Vs. Joe Calzhage Fight

==== Maino featuring Kalenna Harper -unreleased ====
- “Massacre”

=== 2009 ===
==== S0sy ====
- "Hypnotic"
- -Song featured on Style Network on Split Ends August 8, 2009

==== J. Holiday – Round 2 ====
- "Wrong Lover" feat Rick Ro$$
- "Make That Sound"
- "Higher"

==== Triple C’s featRick Ro$$ – White Sands Mixtape ====
- "Illustrious feat Masspike Miles"

=== 2010 ===
==== K. Michelle - “What's The 901 Mixtape” ====
- “Can't Go On”

==== Mel Buckley - “mixtape” ====
- “Chuck The Deuces feat Dorrough

=== 2011 ===
==== Letoya Luckett – Capitol Records ====
- "Doing So Good"

=== 2012 ===
==== D. Woods – My Favorite Color EP – Woodgrane Ent ====
- "Gold Mine"

=== 2013 ===
==== Jarvis – Cardiology – Capitol Records ====
- "U Need Luv"

=== 2014 ===
==== Trina - “Rockstarr Royalty” ====
- “Hottest Chick In The Game”

=== 2015 ===
==== Raheem Devaughn -"Love Sex Passion" ====
- "Temperature's Rising"

==== Case (singer) -"Heaven's Door" ====
- "Difficult"

=== 2017 ===
==== Demetria McKinney -"Officially Yours" ====
- "Kissin" feat Jazze Pha
- "Happy"
- "All Or Nothin"
- "Sextraordinary"
- "Is this Love"
- "Set It Off" feat Demarco
- "Sexualtraordinary Interlude"
- "You Give Good Love"
- "Home" (bonus track) - song featured on Bobbi Kristina movie airing 10/8/17

==== Case (singer) -"The Love Jones EP Vol 1" ====
- "Heaven"
- "Sanctuary"
- "religion"
- "Too Many Nights In LA"

=== 2018 ===
==== Case (singer) - "Therapy" ====
- "Sundress" feat Feedo" (unreleased)
- "Love Will Do"
- "This Could Be"
- "You feat Slim"
- "Spinnin"
- "Trust feat The Floacist"
- "Religion"
- "2 Many Nights"
- "Heaven"
- "Strawberry"

=== 2019 ===
==== J. Holiday - “Untitled” ====
- ”Petals”

==== Raheem Devaughn - "The Love Reunion" ====
- "Metronome"

==== J.Young MDK - “Now Or Never” ====
- “Rich Shit”
- “Savage feat Verse Simmonds”
- “What If”
- “Tha Lo”

==== Bone Crusher - Do The Dirty Bird ====
- “Do The Dirty Bird” - Atlanta Falcons Theme Song

=== 2020 ===
==== Diamond D featuring Snoop Dogg and Case (singer) ====
- “Turn It Up”

==== J. Holiday - Baecation ====
- “Whatcha Say”
- “Four”
- “Dem Belly Full”
- “Magic”
- “Baecation”

==== J. Young featuring Snoop Dogg and Too Short ====
- ”Rich Shit” (REMIX)

==== Bryshere Gray ====
“shine” featuring Akon(unreleased)

=== 2021 ===
==== Demetria McKinney -"untitled" ====
- "Everything"
- "Take It Slow"
- "Red Cup"
- "Baby Love"
- "Climax"
- "Blame You"
- "Goodbye"
- "Crown"
- "Make It Last"
- "All 4 U"
- "Forever"
- "House Of Payne"
- "London Bridge On Ice"
- "Right Word"
- “Stuck”

=== 2022 ===
==== J. Holiday - “Time” ====
- Drip

=== 2024 ===
==== Case (singer) - New Album ====
“Naked” feat RL and Raheem Devaughn

=== 2025 ===
==== Lizzen - New Album ====
“Night And Day”
