= Be with Me (disambiguation) =

Be with Me is a 2005 Singaporean drama film.

Be with Me may also refer to:

- "Be with Me" (The Beach Boys song), 1969
- "Be with Me" (J. Holiday song), 2006
- Be with Me, a Taiwanese film starring Ariel Lin, Vic Chou, Ethan Juan and Joseph Chang
- "Be with Me", a song by Old Dominion from the album Happy Endings (album)

== See also ==
- "B with Me", 2002 Mis-Teeq song
