= The Platinum Brothers =

American record production duo

- Also known as: The Platinum Bros.
- Origin: Atlanta, Georgia, U.S.
- Genres: Hip hop; R&B
- Years active: 2002–present
- Members: Adam "Soulchild" Gibbs; Mike Chesser
- Website: Platinum Brothers Website

The Platinum Brothers are an American record production duo based in Atlanta, Georgia. Consisting of Adam Gibbs and Mike Chesser, the duo produced "Let's Chill" and "So Hot" from Charlie Wilson's album Charlie, Last Name Wilson which has gone on to sell over 300,000 copies.

In 2002, The Platinum Brothers provided the beats to Bone Thugs-N-Harmony's Thug World Order. In August 2004, they sat on the "Super Producers Panel" at Billboard magazine's fifth annual R&B and Hip-Hop Conference Awards in Miami Beach, Florida. In 2005, they contributed to Charlie, Last Name Wilson. They were featured in 2006 on Bone Thugs and Harmony's Koch Records release entitled Thug Stories.

The Platinum Brothers also produced the current single "On The Radio" from Deemi's album entitled Soundtrack Of My Life. They have also produced for artists such as Bone Thugs and Harmony, Bella, Q. Amey, Will Smith, and 4 songs from Nivea (singer)'s 2005 album entitled 'Complicated.

The Platinum Brothers have been featured on episode 3 of BET's TV show Keyshia Cole: The Way It Is, TBA (Bone Thugs-n-Harmony album), and The Movement (Mo Thugs album) and currently are featured on the upcoming albums Brave (Jennifer Lopez album) by Jennifer Lopez and Back Of My Lac by J. Holiday.

== Film and TV Appearances ==
=== 2006 ===
- Keyshia Cole: The Way It Is -Episode 3 (July 26) -originally aired on BET

== Production discography ==
Year	Song	Artist(s)	Album	Notes
2000	"Pop Pop"	Big Caz, Jayo Felony	Thundadome	—N/a
2000	"Waist, Hips & Thighs"	Soulchild, Duane Fowlkes	—N/a	—N/a
2002	"Closer Than Close"	Luniz, Dru Down	Silver & Black	—N/a
2002	"People Change"	Sunz of Man, MC Eiht	Saviorz Day	—N/a
2002	"Get Up & Get It"	Bone Thugs-n-Harmony, 3LW, Felecia	Thug World Order	co-prod. by Bone Thugs-n-Harmony
2003	"All Life Long"	Felecia, Layzie Bone	Mo Thugs IV The Movement	—N/a
2003	"Lyrical .44"	Method Man, Redman, Damian "Jr. Gong" Marley	Red Star Sounds Presents Def Jamaica	prod. w/ Stephen Marley
2004	"Wanna Be"	Adina Howard	The Second Coming	—N/a
2004	"Don't Wait Up"	Adina Howard	The Second Coming	—N/a
2004	"Buttnaked"	Adina Howard	The Second Coming	—N/a
2004	"It's Not Over"	Adina Howard, Ee-De	The Second Coming	—N/a
2004	"Let's Roll"	Adina Howard	The Second Coming	—N/a
2005	"Let's Live"	Krayzie Bone	Gemini: Good vs. Evil	—N/a
2005	"I Can't Mess with You"	Nivea, The-Dream	Complicated	—N/a
2005	"Quickie"	Nivea, Rasheeda	Complicated	—N/a
2005	"No More"	Nivea	Complicated	—N/a
2005	"So Far"	Nivea	Complicated	co-prod. by Karl Antoine & Nastacia "Nazz" Kendall
2005	"Intro: It's Not A Game"	Layzie Bone	It's Not a Game	—N/a
2005	"So Hot"	Charlie Wilson, Twista	Charlie, Last Name Wilson	—N/a
2005	"Let's Chill"	Charlie Wilson	Charlie, Last Name Wilson	prod. w/ Larry "Rock" Campbell
2005	"My Life"	M.O.E. Betta	—N/a	—N/a
2006	"Thug Stories"	Bone Thugs-n-Harmony	Thug Stories	—N/a
2006	"Still No Surrender"	Bone Thugs-n-Harmony	Thug Stories	—N/a
2007	"On the Radio"	Deemi	—N/a	—N/a
2007	"Laa Laa"	J. Holiday	Back of My Lac'	—N/a
2007	"Come Here"	J. Holiday	Back of My Lac'	co-prod. by Travis Cherry
2007	"Gotta Be There"	Jennifer Lopez	Brave	co-prod. by Travis Cherry & Cory Rooney
2007	"Put It In The Air"	Jozeemo, J-Tek	The Untold Story	—N/a
2009	"Fall"	J. Holiday	Round 2	—N/a
2009	"Wrong Lover"	J. Holiday, Rick Ross	Round 2	prod. w/ Travis Cherry
2009	"Run into My Arms"	J. Holiday	Round 2	—N/a
2009	"Make That Sound"	J. Holiday	Round 2	co-prod. by Travis Cherry & Karl Antoine
2010	"Test Drive"	Keith Sweat, Joe	Ridin' Solo	—N/a
