= Uncle Charlie =

Studio album by Charlie Wilson
- Released: February 17, 2009
- Length: 44:45
- Label: Jive
- Producer: Babyface; Bigg D; Los da Mystro; Gregg Pagani; The Platinum Brothers; Random; T-Pain; The Underdogs; Reed Vertelney; Charlie Wilson

Charlie Wilson chronology
Charlie, Last Name Wilson (2005)	Uncle Charlie (2009)	Just Charlie (2010)

Singles from Uncle Charlie
- 1. "Supa Sexxy" Released: July 8, 2008; 2. "There Goes My Baby" Released: October 28, 2008; 3. "Can't Live Without You" Released: May 5, 2009

Uncle Charlie is the fourth studio album by American singer Charlie Wilson. It was released by Jive Records on February 17, 2009. It features production from Gregg Pagani, The Underdogs, Bigg D, T-Pain and Los da Mystro. It features guest appearances from Snoop Dogg, Jamie Foxx and T-Pain. It debuted and peaked at number two on the US Billboard 200 with first week sales of 58,000 copies. At the 52nd Grammy Awards, Uncle Charlie was nominated for Best R&B Album, while the single "There Goes My Baby" was nominated for Best Male R&B Vocal Performance.

== Critical reception ==
Professional ratings
Review scores
Source	Rating
Allmusic	3.5/5 stars

AllMusic editor David Jeffries found that Uncle Charlie "follows the formula of the former Gap Band vocalist's previous release, Charlie, Last Name Wilson [...] The big difference here is that Charlie has taken the duties away from his last executive producer, R. Kelly, but with the Underdogs, T-Pain, and frequent Babyface collaborator Greg Pagani behind the boards, he's got all the help he needs."

== Track listing ==
Uncle Charlie track listing
No.	Title	Writer(s)	Producer(s)	Length
1.	"Musta Heard"	Damon Thomas; James Fauntleroy; Harvey Mason, Jr.; Kristen A. Cole; Melvin Coleman; Steve Russell	The Underdogs; Saint Nick^{[A]}	3:16
2.	"Shawty Come Back"	Charlie Wilson; Francesca Richard; Greg Pagani; J.C. Crowley; Peter Beckett	Wilson; Pagani	3:03
3.	"There Goes My Baby"	Calvin Richardson; Clarence Allen; Daryl Simmons; Pagani; Kenneth "Babyface" Edmonds; Kenneth Copeland; Marvin Eugene Smith	Pagani	3:27
4.	"Can't Live Without You"	Thomas; Mason; Fauntleroy; Russell	The Underdogs	4:17
5.	"Back to Love"	Carlos McKinney; Farrah Fleurimond; Jarret Washington; Natalie Walker	Los da Mystro	4:17
6.	"One Time"	Derrick Baker; Johnta Austin	Bigg D	3:12
7.	"Let It Out" (featuring Snoop Dogg)	Calvin Broadus; Wilson; Richard; Pagani; Lonnie Simmons; Rudolph Taylor	Wilson; Pagani	3:51
8.	"Love, Love, Love"	Thomas; Fauntleroy; Mason; Kenneth Pratt; Luke Boyd; Russell	Random	3:56
9.	"What You Do to Me"	Wilson; Marc Nelkin; Reed Vertelney	Vertelney	3:25
10.	"Homeless"	Antonio Dixon; Thomas; Dawkins; Mason; Russell	The Underdogs; Random	4:11
11.	"Thinkin' of You"	Thomas; Fauntleroy; Mason; Russell	The Underdogs	4:00
12.	"Supa Sexxy" (featuring T-Pain and Jamie Foxx)	Jamie Foxx; Faheem Najm	T-Pain	4:10
Total length:				44:45

Japan bonus tracks
No.	Title	Writer(s)	Producer(s)	Length
13.	"Jump In"	Thomas; Fauntleroy; Mason; Russell	The Underdogs	3:31
14.	"Let You Go"	Thomas; Fauntleroy; Mason; Russell	The Underdogs	3:33

Notes

- ^{^[A]} denotes co-producer

Sample credits

- "Shawty Come Back" contains a portion of the composition "Baby Come Back" as written by Peter Beckett.
- "There Goes My Baby" contains a portion of the composition "Would You Please Be Mine" as written by Kenneth Copeland and Marvin Eugene Smith.
- "Let It Out" contains a portion of the composition "Early in the Morning" as written by Lonnie Simmons, Rudolph Taylor and Charlie Wilson.

== Charts ==
=== Weekly charts ===
Weekly chart performance for Uncle Charlie
Chart (2009)	Peak position
US Billboard 200	2
US Top R&B/Hip-Hop Albums (Billboard)	1

=== Year-end charts ===
2009 year-end chart performance for Uncle Charlie
Chart (2009)	Position
US Billboard 200	125
US Top R&B/Hip-Hop Albums (Billboard)	22

2010 year-end chart performance for Uncle Charlie
Chart (2010)	Position
US Top R&B/Hip-Hop Albums (Billboard)	80
