= Suffocate (J. Holiday song) =

Single by J. Holiday

from the album Back of My Lac'
- Released: October 2, 2007 (U.S.)
- Recorded: 2007
- Genre: R&B
- Length: 3:55
- Label: Music Line Group, Capitol
- Songwriters: Christopher Stewart, Terius Nash
- Producer: Tricky Stewart

J. Holiday singles chronology
"Bed" (2007)	"Suffocate" (2007)	"I Won't Tell" (2007)

Music video
- "Suffocate" on YouTube

"Suffocate" is a song by American R&B singer J. Holiday. It is the third single released from his debut album Back of My Lac'. The song was released as a digital download and sent to mainly urban radio stations. "Suffocate" debuted at number 96 on the Billboard and eventually peaked at number 18.

== Music video ==
The music video was directed by Jonathan Mannion and premiered in late 2007. The video is set in Paris.

== Chart performance ==
"Suffocate" debuted on the Billboard Hot 100 on the week of November 7, 2007, debuting at number 96. Six weeks later, it entered the top 40 at number 35 the week of January 5, 2008. It peaked at number 18 the week of February 23, 2008 and stayed there for two weeks. It stayed on the chart for 24 weeks. It reached number 2 on the Billboard Hot R&B/Hip-Hop Songs.

=== Weekly charts ===
Chart (2007–2008)	Peak position
US Billboard Hot 100	18
US Hot R&B/Hip-Hop Songs (Billboard)	2
US Pop 100 (Billboard)	55
US Rhythmic Airplay (Billboard)	5

=== Year-end charts ===
Chart (2008)	Position
US Billboard Hot 100	64
US Hot R&B/Hip-Hop Songs (Billboard)	5
US Rhythmic (Billboard)	23

== Certifications ==
Region	Certification	Certified units/sales
United States (RIAA)	Gold	500,000^{^}
^{^} Shipments figures based on certification alone.

== Release history ==
Release dates and formats for "Suffocate"
Region	Date	Format	Label(s)	Ref.
United States	February 4, 2008	Mainstream airplay	Capitol	
