= Charlie, Last Name Wilson =

Studio album by Charlie Wilson
- Released: August 23, 2005
- Length: 51:30
- Label: Jive
- Producer: Terence Abney; Larry Campbell; Dre & Vidal; The Jaw Breakers; KayGee; R. Kelly; Gregg Pagani; The Platinum Brothers; T-Pain; Tank; The Underdogs; Cordell Walton; Charlie Wilson

Charlie Wilson chronology
| Bridging the Gap (2000) | Charlie, Last Name Wilson (2005) | Uncle Charlie (2009) |

Charlie, Last Name Wilson is the third studio album by American singer Charlie Wilson. It was released by Jive Records on August 23, 2005, in the United States. The album includes production from several R&B hitmakers including R. Kelly, will.i.am, Justin Timberlake, T-Pain, KayGee, Terence "Tramp-Baby" Abney, The Underdogs and The Platinum Brothers. Charlie, Last Name Wilson debuted and peaked at number 10 on the US Billboard 200 with first week sales of 71,400 copies. In 2009, it was also certified gold by the RIAA, surpassing sales of 500,000 copies.

== Critical reception ==
Professional ratings
Review scores
| Source | Rating |
|---|---|
| AllMusic | 3.5/5 stars |
| USA Today | 3/4 stars |

Steve Jones, writing for USA Today, noted that "Wilson, like Ronald Isley before him, takes full advantage of [R.] Kelly's writing and studio prowess to do some of his best work in years. His soulful handling of everything from romantic ballads to playa anthems reminds you why Uncle Charlie is one of the hip-hop generation's favorite musical relatives." AllMusic editor Alex Henderson found that Charlie, Last Name Wilson "isn't in a class with the singer's best recordings with the Gap Band, but it's a respectable and inspired demonstration of his ability to be relevant to the hip-hop-drenched urban contemporary scene of 2005." Billboard wrote that with Charlie, Last Name Wilson " Wilson shows off his generation-spanning vocals to full effect. Rather than sounding forced, the teaming here with younger hotshots like R. Kelly and Twista is a natural fit thanks to Wilson's crooner-to-funkster prowess."

== Chart performance ==
Charlie, Last Name Wilson debuted and peaked at number ten on the US Billboard 200, with first week sales of 71,000 copies. It also reached number three on Billboard's Top R&B/Hip-Hop Albums chart. By January 2009, the album had sold 442,000 copies in the United States, according to Nielsen SoundScan. It was certified Gold by the Recording Industry Association of America (RIAA) on February 5, 2009.

== Track listing ==
Charlie, Last Name Wilson track listing
| No. | Title | Writer(s) | Producer(s) | Length |
|---|---|---|---|---|
| 1. | "Magic" | R. Kelly | R. Kelly | 3:35 |
| 2. | "Charlie, Last Name Wilson" | R. Kelly | R. Kelly | 3:35 |
| 3. | "So Hot" (featuring Twista) | Adams Gibbs; Carl Mitchell; Mike Chesser; Todd "Boogie" Muhammad | The Platinum Brothers | 3:58 |
| 4. | "Let's Chill" | Bernard Belle; Keith Sweat; Teddy Riley | The Platinum Brothers; Larry "Rock" Campbell | 5:02 |
| 5. | "No Words" | R. Kelly | R. Kelly | 4:47 |
| 6. | "Floatin'" (featuring will.i.am and Justin Timberlake) | Timberlake; William Adams | The Jaw Breakers | 5:13 |
| 7. | "Asking Questions" | Clarance Allen; Duane Covert; Gregg Pagani; Todd Muhammad | Pagani | 4:03 |
| 8. | "What If I'm the One" | Antonio Dixon; Damon Thomas; Eric Dawkins; Harvey Mason Jr.; Durrell Babbs | The Underdogs; Tank^{[A]} | 4:37 |
| 9. | "You Got Nerve" (featuring Snoop Dogg) | Faheem Najm; Calvin Broadus | T-Pain | 3:25 |
| 10. | "Thru It All" | Eric Roberson; Andre Harris; Vidal Davis | Dre & Vidal | 4:09 |
| 11. | "My Guarantee" | Belewa Muhammad; Big Drawz; Esteban Crandle; Eritza Laues; Frank "Sekay" Oliphant; Keir Gist; Nastacia Kendall | Kay Gee; Terence "Tramp Baby" Abney | 3:45 |
| 12. | "Cry No More" | Cordell Walton; Charlie Wilson; M. Wilson; Waymon Starks | C. Wilson; Walton | 5:16 |
| Total length: | | | | 51:30 |

Notes

- ^{^[A]} denotes co-producer

Sample credits

- "Floatin'" contains a portion of the composition of "Over Like a Fat Rat" as written by Leroy Burgess, James Calloway & Aaron Davenport.

== Charts ==
=== Weekly charts ===
Weekly chart performance for Charlie, Last Name Wilson
| Chart (2005) | Peak position |
|---|---|
| US Billboard 200 | 10 |
| US Top R&B/Hip-Hop Albums (Billboard) | 3 |

=== Year-end charts ===
2005 year-end chart performance for Charlie, Last Name Wilson
| Chart (2005) | Position |
|---|---|
| US Top R&B/Hip-Hop Albums (Billboard) | 76 |

2006 year-end chart performance for Charlie, Last Name Wilson
| Chart (2006) | Position |
|---|---|
| US Top R&B/Hip-Hop Albums (Billboard) | 64 |

== Certifications ==
Certifications for Charlie, Last Name Wilson
| Region | Certification | Certified units/sales |
|---|---|---|
| United States (RIAA) | Gold | 500,000^{^} |
^{^} Shipments figures based on certification alone.
