= Just Charlie =

Studio album by Charlie Wilson
- Released: December 3, 2010
- Length: 38:50
- Label: Jive
- Producers: Emile Ghantous; Wirlie Morris; Erik Nelson; Gregg Pagani; Charlie Wilson

Charlie Wilson chronology
Uncle Charlie (2009)	Just Charlie (2010)	Love, Charlie (2013)

Singles from Just Charlie
- 1. "You Are" Released: October 12, 2010; 2. "Life of the Party" Released: April 15, 2011; 3. "I Want to Be Your Man" Released: June 17, 2011

Just Charlie is the fifth studio album by American singer Charlie Wilson. It was released by Jive Records on December 3, 2010 in the United States. The album debuted and peaked at number 19 on the US Billboard 200 and at number 2 on the US Top R&B/Hip-Hop Albums chart, selling 57,286 copies in its first week. Fantasia is the only featured guest on Just Charlie, who appears on a remake of the Roger Troutman song, "I Want to Be Your Man".

The album also includes the hit single, "You Are", which earned Wilson a career high debut on the Billboard Hot R&B/Hip Hop Songs chart and topped the Billboard Urban Adult Contemporary Chart. "You Are" remained at number one for 13 weeks on the Billboard UAC Chart, climbing to number 16 on the Billboard Hot R&B/Hip-Hop Songs chart, number 7 on the Heatseeker Songs chart, number 19 on the Christian Songs chart, and number 64 on Radio Songs chart.

== Critical reception ==
Professional ratings
Review scores
Source	Rating
AllMusic	3.5/5 stars

AllMusic editor David Jeffries felt that Just Charlie "sticks with the high-quality "grown folks" R&B material that put his previous two albums in the Top Ten of Billboard 200 album chart. Besides whittling the number of special guests down from three to one, casual fans will have problems telling this one from his previous release, but these ten smooth cuts go down easy and give no sign the formula has stopped working [...] Maybe the album naming scheme – Charlie, Last Name Wilson, Uncle Charlie, Just Charlie – could be reconsidered, but otherwise, this is Wilson the way you want him."

== Track listing ==
Just Charlie track listing
No.	Title	Writer(s)	Producer(s)	Length
1.	"My Girl Is a Dime"	Carl M. Days Jr.; Charlie Wilson; Dennis Bettis; Mahin Wilson; Wirlie Morris	Morris	3:48
2.	"You Are"	Days; C. Wilson; Bettis; M. Wilson; Morris	Morris	4:10
3.	"I Wanna Be Your Man" (featuring Fantasia)	Larry Troutman; Roger Troutman	Gregg Pagani	3:27
4.	"Never Got Enough"	C. Wilson; Emile Ghantous; Erik Nelson; Frankie Bautista; M. Wilson; Samuel Salter	C. Wilson; Ghantous; Nelson	4:13
5.	"Once and Forever"	C. Wilson; Pagani; Lance Tolbert; M. Wilson; Robbie Nevil	Pagani	3:43
6.	"Life of the Party"	C. Wilson; Edwin "Lil Eddie" Serrano; Pagani; Tolbert; M. Wilson; William "Casper" Serrano; Deanna Della Ciopp	Pagani	3:18
7.	"I Can't Let Go"	C. Wilson; M. Wilson; Traci Hale; Morris	Morris	3:49
8.	"Crying for You"	Almarcus T. Dean; Days; C. Wilson; Bettis; M. Wilson; Morris	Morris	3:57
9.	"Where Would I Be"	Dean; Days; C. Wilson; Bettis; M. Wilson; Morris	Morris	3:59
10.	"Lotto"	C. Wilson; M. Wilson; Morris	Morris	3:46
Total length:				38:50

iTunes pre-order bonus track
No.	Title	Writer(s)	Producer(s)	Length
11.	"Throw It All Away"	C. Wilson	C. Wilson	3:47

== Charts ==
=== Weekly charts ===
Weekly chart performance for Just Charlie
Chart (2010)	Peak position
US Billboard 200	19
US Top R&B/Hip-Hop Albums (Billboard)	6

=== Year-end charts ===
Year-end chart performance for Just Charlie
Chart (2011)	Position
US Billboard 200	158
US Top R&B/Hip-Hop Albums (Billboard)	34

== Release history ==
Release history and formats for Just Charlie
Region	Date	Format(s)	Label	Ref
United States	December 3, 2010	CD; digital download	Jive	
