= Round 2 (J. Holiday album) =

Studio album by J. Holiday
- Released: March 10, 2009
- Recorded: 2008–2009
- Studios: Carrington House and Christian Boy Studios in Atlanta; Signature Sound Studios, The Red Room and The Music House in Sherman Oaks
- Genres: R&B; hip hop
- Length: 47:36
- Labels: Music Line; Capitol
- Producers: Allstar; Big Reese; Chuck Harmony; The Co-Stars; The-Dream; Jasper Cameron; Jon Ørom; Jules Wolfson; Ne-Yo; The Platinum Brothers; Reginald Hamlet; State of Emergency; Travis Cherry

J. Holiday chronology
| Back of My Lac' (2007) | Round 2 (2009) | Guilty Conscience (2014) |

Singles from Round 2
- 1. "It's Yours" Released: December 16, 2008

Round 2 is the second studio album by American recording artist J. Holiday, it was released on March 10, 2009, by Music Line Group and Capitol Records. It is the follow-up to his debut album, Back of My Lac', which was released in 2007. This record would later be his final studio release with Capitol. The album was supported by the lone single, "It's Yours", which achieved moderate chart success.

Upon release, Round 2 received mixed reviews from music critics, who complimented its production and songwriting and was considered to be an improvement from his previous album.

== Singles ==
The first single "It's Yours", was released on December 16, 2008. The song had achieved minor chart success, debuting at number 25 on the US Hot R&B/Hip-Hop Songs and also debuting at number 33 on the Japan Hot 100 chart. A music video was released and directed by Jonathan Mannion.

The second single that was supposed to be released was Fall, but due to label problems it was canceled like "Come Here" on his previous album.

== Commercial performance ==
The album sold 55,000 copies in its first week and debuted at number 4 on the Billboard 200. The album has sold 300,000 copies in the United States.

== Critical reception ==
Professional ratings
Aggregate scores
| Source | Rating |
|---|---|
| Album of the Year | 65/100 |
Review scores
| Source | Rating |
| About.com | 3.5/5 stars |
| AllMusic | 3.5/5 stars |
| Associated Press | (favorable) |
| DJBooth | 3.5/5 stars |
| PopMatters | 6/10 |
| Rolling Stone | 3/5 stars |
| Vibe | (mixed) |

Round 2 received mixed reviews from music critics. Andy Kellman of AllMusic said, "Holiday instead delivers a second album that is not a retread. It's not a reinvention, either, but the roster of collaborators is almost completely different, and Holiday all but eliminates the tough guy and stoner talk." Mark Edward Nero of About.com said Round 2 is a well-sung, well-written, well-produced album, but the one negative is that it's a little bland and leans too much on love songs. Nathan Slavik of DJBooth stated that Round 2 finds Holiday shifting away from Lac’s harder-edged image in favor of a smoother sound, resulting in a well-crafted album that shows that while Holiday's got a ways to go before he reaches elite status, no one will ever be able to call him a one-hit wonder again.

== Track listing ==
Round 2 track listing
| No. | Title | Writer(s) | Producer(s) | Length |
|---|---|---|---|---|
| 1. | "Intro" | Nahum Grymes | J. Holiday | 0:36 |
| 2. | "It's Yours" | Cameron; Grymes | Jasper Cameron; Big Reese | 4:06 |
| 3. | "Fall" | Gibbs; Chesser; Austin; Smith; Wright; Green | The Platinum Brothers | 3:32 |
| 4. | "Don't Go" | Shaffer Smith; Charles Harmon | Chuck Harmony | 3:31 |
| 5. | "Wrong Lover" (featuring Rick Ross) | Gibbs; Chesser; Austin; Travis Cherry; Grymes; Wellington; William Roberts II; Mcnair, Jr.; Biggs; Wansel | The Platinum Brothers; Travis Cherry | 4:12 |
| 6. | "Run into My Arms" | Gibbs; Chesser; Austin; Cherry; Grymes | The Platinum Brothers | 4:04 |
| 7. | "Sing 2 U" | Grymes; Bowen; Hamlet | Reginald Hamlet | 3:15 |
| 8. | "Lights Go Out" | Grymes; Bowen; Gordon | Allstar | 3:52 |
| 9. | "Make That Sound" | Gibbs; Chesser; Cherry; Antoine; Grymes; Brown | The Platinum Brothers; Travis Cherry^{[a]}; Karl Antoine^{[a]} | 4:07 |
| 10. | "Forever Ain't Enough" | Grymes; Jean; Orom; Wolfson | Jules Wolfson; Jon Ørom^{[a]} | 4:22 |
| 11. | "Fly" | Babbs; Grymes; Dinkins Jr.; Colapietro | The Co-Stars | 4:17 |
| 12. | "Homeless" | Grymes; Scantlebury; Austin | State of Emergency | 3:43 |
| 13. | "I Tried" | Grymes; Scantlebury; Austin | State of Emergency | 3:49 |
| Total length: | | | | 47:36 |

iTunes bonus track
| No. | Title | Writer(s) | Producer(s) | Length |
|---|---|---|---|---|
| 14. | "Magic Man" | Austin; Grymes; Scantz | Donnie Scantz | 3:18 |
| Total length: | | | | 50:54 |

Japanese edition (bonus tracks)
| No. | Title | Length |
|---|---|---|
| 14. | "Holiday" | 4:16 |
| 15. | "Bed (Haji & Emanuel Remix)" | 3:31 |
| Total length: | | 55:13 |

Notes

- ^{^[a]} signifies an co-producer

Sample credits

- "Wrong Lover" contains interpolations from the composition "Hurry Up This way Again" written by Cynthia Biggs & Dexter Wansel.

== Personnel ==
Credits for Round 2 adapted from Allmusic.

- All-Star – Audio Production, Engineer, Producer
- Karl Antoine – Composer
- Luke Austin – Audio Production, Composer, Keyboards, Producer
- Babbs – Composer
- Chris Bellman – Mastering
- Big Reese – Audio Production
- Cynthia Biggs – Composer
- Bowen – Composer
- Ronette Bowie – A&R
- David Brown – Composer, Vocal Arrangement
- Cameron – Composer
- Travis Cherry – Composer
- Mike Chesser – Producer, Audio Production, Composer
- Cmillions – Producer
- Colapietro – Composer
- Vito Colapietro – Composer
- The Co-Stars – Audio Production
- Chris Dave – Drums
- Chris 'Daddy' Dave – Drums, Woodwind
- Kevin "KD" Davis – Mixing
- Neely Dinkins – Engineer
- Neely Dinkins Jr. – Composer
- Nicole Frantz – Creative Director
- Moses Gallart – Mixing Assistant
- Adam Gibbs – Producer, Audio Production, Composer
- Gordon – Composer
- Green – Composer
- Grymes – Composer
- Reggie Hamlet – Producer
- Reginald Hamlet – Audio Production, Composer
- Chuck Harmony – Audio Production, Composer, Producer
- J. Holiday – Arranger, Audio Production, Engineer, Executive Producer, Primary Artist, Producer, Vocals (Background)
- Elizabeth Isik – A&R
- Jasper – Arranger, Audio Production, Drum Programming, Keyboards, Vocals (Background)
- Jaycen Joshua – Mixing
- Jean – Composer
- Mike Johnson – Engineer
- Darius Jones – A&R
- Kori Lewis – Stylist
- Giancarlo Lino – Mixing Assistant
- Carlton Lynn – Engineer
- Erik Madrid – Mixing Assistant
- Ankur Malhotra – A&R
- Jonathan Mannion – Art Direction, Photography
- Manny Marroquin – Mixing
- McNair Jr. – Composer
- Ne-Yo – Audio Production, Producer
- Jon Ørom – Audio Production, Composer, Producer
- David Oromaner – Composer
- Dave Pensado – Mixing
- Christian Plata – Mixing Assistant
- The Platinum Brothers – Audio Production
- Geno Regist – Engineer
- Roberts – Composer
- April Roomet – Stylist
- Rick Ross – Featured Artist, Primary Artist
- Scantlebury – Composer
- Donnie Scantz – Arranger, Engineer, Keyboards, Programming
- Smith – Composer
- S. Smith – Composer
- State of Emergency – Audio Production
- Mark Stowbridge – Guitar
- Mark Strowbridge – Guitar
- James Thompson – Guitar (Bass)
- Randy Urbanski – Mixing Assistant
- Dexter Wansel – Composer
- John Webb – Guitar (Bass)
- John Webb – Guitar (Bass)
- Wellington – Composer
- Jules Wolfson – Audio Production, Composer, Producer
- Wright – Composer
- Andrew Wuepper – Mixing Assistant

== Charts ==
Weekly chart performance for Round 2
| Chart (2009) | Peak position |
|---|---|
| Japanese Albums (Oricon) | 54 |
| US Billboard 200 | 4 |
| US Top R&B/Hip-Hop Albums (Billboard) | 2 |
