= Bridging the Gap (Charlie Wilson album) =

Studio album by Charlie Wilson
- Released: November 14, 2000
- Length: 59:28
- Label: Interscope
- Producer: Laney Stewart; Tricky Stewart; Ray Watkins; Wirlie Morris; Angie Stone

Charlie Wilson chronology
You Turn My Life Around (1992)	Bridging the Gap (2000)	Charlie, Last Name Wilson (2005)

Bridging the Gap is the second studio album by Charlie Wilson, a member of the R&B group the Gap Band. It was released on November 14, 2000, through Interscope Records. The album debuted at number 184 on the US Billboard 200 and peaked at number 152.

== Critical reception ==
Professional ratings
Review scores
Source	Rating
AllMusic	2/5 stars

AllMusic rated the album two out of five stars and wrote: "Wilson is equally comfortable with the percolating, hip-hop-inflected jump of the opening cut "Absolutely," the tender, Stevie Wonder-influenced ministrations of the love ballad "For Your Love," or the unapologetically titled "Big Pimpin'," wherein our mack daddy tells the object of his desire "if you're not planning to stay/let me help you on your way." Wilson's fluid tenor provides him equal access to all these soul scenarios. The state-of-the-art production keeps things sounding seamless no matter which direction the appropriately named Bridging the Gap takes." Billboard found that Wilson "scores a home run with his first solo set" and described the album as a "mix of R&B/hip-hop finds the veteran doing just that, teaming up with such contempo- raries as Case, Angie Stone, Snoop Dogg, Mare Nelson, Nate Dogg, and Chris "Tricky" Stewart [...] Uncle Charlie proves he's still a player."

== Chart performance ==
Bridging the Gap peaked at number 152 on the US Billboard 200 and number 30 on the Top R&B/Hip-Hop Albums chart. By January 2009, it had sold 195,000 copies in the United States, according to Nielsen SoundScan.

== Track listing ==
Bridging the Gap track listing
No.	Title	Writer(s)	Producer(s)	Length
1.	"Absolutely"	Christopher Stewart; Traci Hale	Tricky Stewart	3:57
2.	"Another Man" (featuring Case)	Case Woodard; Raymond Watkins	Leland Robinson; Watkins	4:18
3.	"Without You"	Orenthal Harper; Laney Stewart; Hale; Katrina Willis; Thabiso "Tab" Nkhereanye	L. Stewart	5:00
4.	"Would You Mind"	C. Stewart; Hale; Nkhereanye	T. Stewart	3:37
5.	"Big Pimpin'" (featuring Nate Dogg and Snoop Dogg)	L. Stewart; Hale; Nkhereanye	L. Stewart	4:11
6.	"Can I Take You Home"	L. Stewart; Hale; Nkhereanye	L. Stewart	4:12
7.	"For Your Love" (featuring Marc Nelson)	Nelson; Wirlie Morris	Nelson; Morris	5:00
8.	"Now Ya Sayin' Bye"	C. Stewart; Hale; Nkhereanye	T. Stewart	3:58
9.	"Him or Me"	C. Stewart; Hale; Nkhereanye	T. Stewart	3:57
10.	"Sweet Love"	Nelson; Morris	Nelson; Morris	4:57
11.	"Come Back My Way"	L. Stewart; Hale; Nkhereanye	L. Stewart	3:57
12.	"A Wonderful One"	Angie Stone	Stone; Freedom Lyles^{[a]}	4:14
13.	"Charlie's Angel"	L. Stewart; Hale; Nkhereanye	L. Stewart	4:02

Bonus track
No.	Title	Writer(s)	Producer(s)	Length
14.	"One Way Street" (featuring Avant)	Myron Avant; Steve "Stone" Huff	Huff	4:13
Total length:				59:28

Notes

- ^{^[a]} denotes co-producer(s)

== Charts ==
Weekly chart performance for Bridging the Gap
Chart (2001)	Peak position
US Billboard 200	152
US Top R&B/Hip-Hop Albums (Billboard)	30
