= There Goes My Baby (Charlie Wilson song) =

Single by Charlie Wilson

from the album Uncle Charlie
- Released: October 24, 2008
- Genre: R&B; Urban contemporary
- Length: 3:27
- Label: Jive; Zomba
- Songwriters: Calvin Richardson; Clarence Allen; Daryl Simmons; Greg Pagani; Kenneth Edmonds; Kenneth Copeland; Marvin Smith
- Producer: Gregg Pagani

Charlie Wilson singles chronology
"Supa Sexy" (2008)	"There Goes My Baby" (2008)	"Can't Live Without You" (2009)

"There Goes My Baby" is a song by American R&B singer Charlie Wilson. It was released on October 24, 2008, as the second single of his fourth studio album Uncle Charlie, with the record labels Jive Records and Zomba Recording. The song was produced by Gregg Pagani and written by Babyface, Daryl Simmons, Kenneth Copeland, Marvin Eugene Smith, Gregg Pagani, Clarence Allen and Calvin Richardson. It was nominated at the Grammy Awards of 2010 for Best Male R&B Vocal Performance.

== Background ==
Wilson said: "When they presented me with this song, I knew it was a winner. I was in love with it." The song samples Rose Royce's song "Would You Please Be Mine".

== Music video ==
The music video, directed by David Roma, follows the love story of Snoop Dogg and his wife Shante Taylor's love story with multiple clips of archive footage. The video has over 100 million views on YouTube.

== Track listing ==
- Download digital
1. There Goes My Baby — 3:29

== Commercial performance ==
"There Goes My Baby" debut for the Billboard Hot 100 chart dated May 16, 2009, entering the chart at number 98. The song topped Adult R&B Songs chart.

== Charts ==
=== Weekly charts ===
Chart (2009)	Peak position
US Billboard Hot 100	98
US Adult R&B Songs (Billboard)	1
US Hot R&B/Hip-Hop Songs (Billboard)	15

=== Year-end charts ===
Chart (2009)	Position
US Hot R&B/Hip-Hop Songs (Billboard)	26
