= Guilty Conscience (album) =

Studio album by J. Holiday
- Released: January 28, 2014
- Recorded: 2013
- Studio: The Boom Boom Room, Los Angeles
- Genre: Soul; R&B
- Length: 45:11
- Label: Music Line; HMG; Central South
- Producer: Ronnie Jackson, Anthony "T.A." Tate

J. Holiday chronology
Round 2 (2009)	Guilty Conscience (2014)	Baecation (2020)

Singles from Guilty Conscience
- 1. "After We Fuck" Released: November 12, 2013; 2. "Incredible" Released: February 17, 2014; 3. "Where Are You Now" Released: August 2014

Professional ratings
Review scores
Source	Rating
Urban Informer	4.5/5 stars
You Know I Got Soul	4/5 stars

Guilty Conscience is the third studio album by American recording artist J. Holiday, released by his own label HMG (Holiday Music Group) and Music Line Group on January 28, 2014. It is Holiday's first album since Round 2 (2009), and his first independent release.

The album features production from Lil Ronnie, Ronnie D, Jerry Wonda, Blaq Smurph and Miyk Snoddy, among others. Guilty Conscience receive mostly positive reviews, giving the album 4.5 out of 5 stars.

== Release ==
The first single "After We Fuck" was released on September 23, 2013. In November 2013, Holiday teased a sampler of the album with four snippets and three full tracks available for download at djbooth.net. The album was announced for a December release, but this was pushed back to January 28, 2014. Guilty Conscience hit number 42 on the Top R&B/Hip-Hop Albums chart on February 14. The second single "Incredible", was sent to urban radio on February 17, 2014.

== Inspiration ==
Three weeks before the album was officially released, J. Holiday explained the concept behind the title, saying:

"I named it Guilty Conscience because it’s basically like a movie. Let’s say, because I do what I do; I’m an R&B artist. So let’s say that if you could put a soundtrack to my life, in the last 5 years, this would be the soundtrack. So it’s kind of like, I’m telling my business. You know what I mean and I didn’t really want to. But it’s going to help when it comes to relationships like love and all of that because it’s like the sh*t really happens. The same way Steve Harvey did the book Act Like A Lady, Think Like A Man. So it’s like the album, like I messed up with my main chick, trying to get with the side-chick. Like she was out there, but I didn’t know. So now I’m learning and I have to go back and fix my relationship because the side-chick got me all tore up. So for instance, like on the title track Guilty Conscience, that’s me talking to my main girl. And now I’m like, where you going, what are you doing, why are you doing this, why are you putting on make-up? You know what I mean and that’s the guilty conscience and what it’s about."

== Track listing ==
Guilty Conscience – CD – digital download – streaming
No.	Title	Writer(s)	Producer(s)	Length
1.	"Incredible"	Brandon Alexander Hodge; Ronnie Jackson; Marquis A. Foxx; Aaron C. Sledge	Lil Ronnie; B.A.M.	4:02
2.	"Thinkin About You"	Richard Preston Butler; Jermine Jackson; Andrew Harr; Andre Davidson; Karlyn Ramsey; Shawn Davidson	Phil Cornish	2:38
3.	"Cloud 9"	Alexandria Dollar; Jordan Dollar; Ronnie Jackson	Phil Cornish	3:51
4.	"After We Fuck"	Rafael Ishman; Jackson; Ronak Dalal	Lil Ronnie; Ronnie D	3:31
5.	"Guilty Conscience"	Ursula Yancy, Lil Ronnie	Patrick "Guitarboy" Hayes; Phil Cornish	4:08
6.	"Ms. Get Around"	Ursula Yancy, Lil Ronnie		3:33
7.	"Wrong Turn"	Ursula Yancy, Lil Ronnie		3:23
8.	"Home Wrecker"	Ursula Yancy, Lil Ronnie	Lil Ronnie	4:08
9.	"Dumb"		Patrick "Guitarboy" Hayes	3:24
10.	"Come Back Home"	Shaunte Talbert; Christopher Newland; Jackson		3:23
11.	"Where Are You Now"	Samuel James Harris III; Terry Lewis		4:22
12.	"Heaven"	John W. Jackson	Arden Altino	4:49
Total length:				45:11

Note

- The track listing was confirmed by Amazon.com.

== Credits and personnel ==
Credits for Guilty Conscience adapted from Allmusic and album credits.

- Brandon Alexander – bass, instrumentation
- Arden Altino – composer, keyboards, producer
- B.A.M. – composer, producer
- JD Butler – Recording and mixing engineer
- Blaq Smurph – instrumentation, producer
- Phil Cornish – composer, keyboards, producer
- Ronnie D – producer
- Jerry "Wonda" Duplessis – bass, composer, producer
- C. Dwight – composer
- Rod Harris Jr. – Guitar
- Patrick "Guitarboy" Hayes – composer, guitar, producer
- J. Holiday – primary artist
- Araceli Jackson – A&R
- Ronnie Jackson – composer, executive producer, producer
- Jubu – guitar
- Phillip Lassiter – horn
- Colin Leonard – mastering
- Lil Ronnie – Instrumentation, producer, vocal producer
- Brandyn Porter – guitar
- Miykal Snoddy – composer, producer
- Anthony "T.A." Tate – composer, executive producer, producer
- Zach Wolfe – photography

== Charts ==
Chart (2014)	Peak position
US Top R&B/Hip-Hop Albums (Billboard)	42

== Release history ==
Region	Date	Format(s)	Label
United States	January 28, 2014	CD; digital download	Music Line; HMG
