= Charlie Wilson (singer) =

American singer (born 1953)

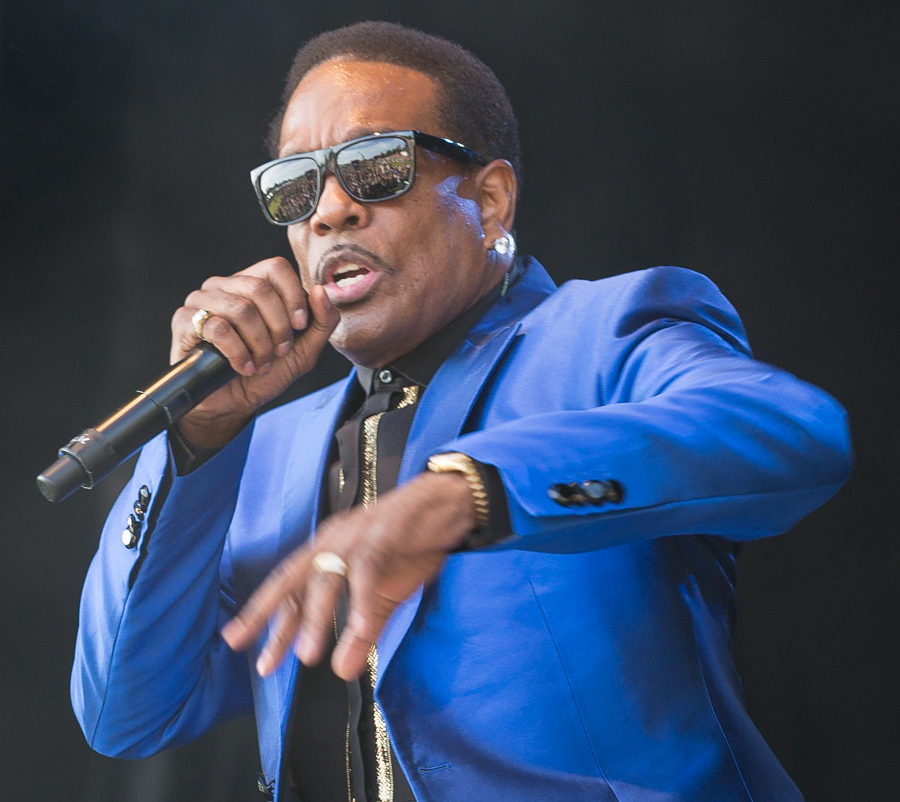
- Wilson at Stavernfestivalen in 2016

Background information
- Also known as: Uncle Charlie
- Born: Charles Kent Wilson; January 29, 1953 (age 73); Tulsa, Oklahoma, U.S.
- Genres: R&B; soul; funk
- Occupations: Singer; songwriter; record producer
- Instruments: Vocals; keyboards; organ; drums
- Works: Discography; production
- Years active: 1972–present
- Labels: P Music; Interscope; Jive; RCA; Doggy Style; MCA; Elektra
- Member of: The Gap Band
- Website: charliewilsonmusic.com

Charles Kent Wilson (born January 29, 1953), also known as Uncle Charlie, is an American singer, songwriter, and record producer who served as lead vocalist for the Gap Band from its 1967 formation until its 2010 disbandment. As a solo act, Wilson has been nominated for 13 Grammy Awards and 11 NAACP Image Awards (including two wins), received a 2009 Soul Train Icon Award, and was a recipient of a BMI Icon Award in 2005. In 2009 and 2020, he was named Billboard magazine's No. 1 Adult R&B Artist, and his song "There Goes My Baby" was named the No. 1 Urban Adult Song for 2009 in Billboard.

On June 30, 2013, BET honored Wilson with a Lifetime Achievement Award. Wilson is the national spokesman of the Prostate Cancer Foundation, where there is a Creativity Award in his name. The organization donates hundreds of thousands of dollars a year to cancer research across the United States.

== Early life ==
Charles Kent Wilson was born in Tulsa, Oklahoma, on January 29, 1953; he is the son of the Reverend Oscar Wilson, a minister in the Church of God in Christ. With his older brother Ronnie and younger brother Robert, Wilson often sang in church before their father's Sunday sermons, accompanied on piano by their mother. He also sang in his junior high school's choir, which was a precursor to his musical career with the Gap Band and later his solo career. He attended high school at Booker T. Washington High School and graduated in 1971. He attended Langston University and would go on to become drum major in the Langston University Marching Pride.

== Career ==
=== The Gap Band ===
Charlie and his brothers, Robert and Ronnie, helped define and popularize an upbeat form of funk music with their group the Gap Band. Magicians Holiday was the debut album by the Gap Band in 1974 on Shelter Records founded by Leon Russell and Denny Cordell. The band recorded at The Church Studio, a historic recording studio in Tulsa, Oklahoma. The group's songs such as "Outstanding", "Party Train", "Yearning for Your Love", "Burn Rubber on Me", "You Dropped a Bomb on Me", and "Oops Upside Your Head" are among some of the most sampled songs in music history. After 15 albums the Gap Band announced their retirement in 2010.

=== Solo ===
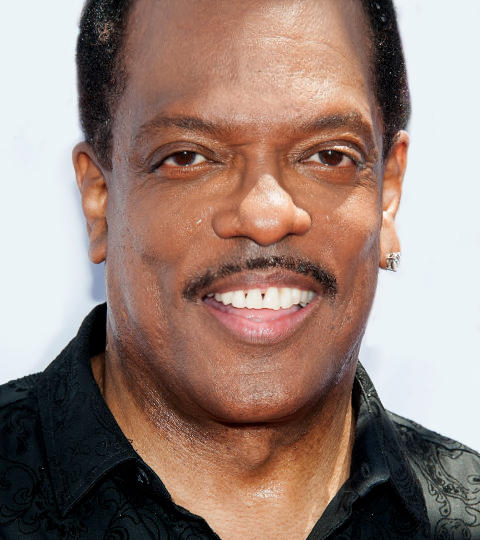
Wilson in 2014

In 1986, Wilson contributed vocals to Roger & Zapp's hit "Computer Love", a song that become a hit despite initial opposition from Wilson's label. There was a discussion between Roger Troutman and Wilson to create a music video for the song. Unfortunately, this did not come to fruition, due to opposition from the label that Wilson was signed to at the time. However, the two maintained their close friendship, and would perform the song often together on stage.

In 1989, Wilson worked with Eurythmics on their album We Too Are One, providing backing vocals on several tracks and co-writing the hit song "Revival". Wilson performed the song with the band on the British television chat show Wogan in August 1989. In 1998, Wilson performed on Mystikal's Ghetto Fabulous album.

Michael Paran, CEO of Mango Music Group, was responsible for rebranding the Gap Band in 1997. He has since managed Wilson as a solo artist.

Paran and Wilson independently released Wilson's first solo album Bridging the Gap (2000), which scored them Wilson's first No. 1 Billboard Urban Adult Contemporary single, "Without You". In 2004 Wilson signed a multi-album deal with Jive Records. The first album from that deal, Charlie, Last Name Wilson, debuted in the fall of 2005 featuring production from various hit-making producers including R. Kelly, Justin Timberlake, will.i.am, the Underdogs, Kay Gee, and the Platinum Brothers. The album, which was certified gold by the R.I.A.A., produced the hit single, "Charlie, Last Name Wilson". Since then, Wilson has consistently topped the Billboard Urban Adult Contemporary chart with singles from his follow up albums through P Music/Jive Records. Altogether Charlie Wilson's albums have sold over one million copies.

In 2007, Wilson performed in two songs on UGK's Underground Kingz album: "Quit Hatin' the South" and "How Long Can It Last".

His 2009 LP, Uncle Charlie, debuted at No. 2 on the Billboard Hot 200 and No. 1 on the Billboard R&B/Hip-Hop chart, and received two 2010 Grammy nominations: Best R&B Album and Best R&B Vocal Performance, Male for "There Goes My Baby". In December 2010, Just Charlie was released and spawned the hit single "You Are" which held the No. 1 spot on the Billboard Urban Adult Contemporary chart for 13 weeks as well as 15 weeks consecutively on the Mediabase chart. The song earned two 2012 Grammy nominations, Best R&B Performance and Best R&B Song, giving Wilson, his wife Mahin, and their fellow songwriters Dennis Bettis, Carl M. Days, Jr., and Wirlie Morris (who co-produced the track with Wilson) their first nomination as songwriters together.

In 2010, chart-topping producer/artist Kanye West included Wilson on his album, My Beautiful Dark Twisted Fantasy. Wilson recorded over a dozen songs with Kanye and appeared on the following songs: "See Me Now", with Kanye West featuring Beyoncé; "All of the Lights", with Kanye West featuring Rihanna; "Lost in the World", "Runaway", and "Monster", with Kanye West featuring Jay-Z, Nicki Minaj, and Rick Ross. In addition to these songs, Wilson appeared on five of the G.O.O.D. Friday Releases to promote the new CD including, "Lord, Lord, Lord" with Kanye West, featuring Mos Def, Swizz Beatz, Raekwon; and "Good Friday" with Common, Pusha T, Kid Cudi, and Big Sean. He also appears on "Bound 2", the closer of Yeezus, West's 2013 album.

On June 30, 2013, BET honored Wilson with a Lifetime Achievement Award that was presented to him by Justin Timberlake. The BET tribute performances included renditions of Wilson's songs performed by India Arie ("There Goes My Baby"), Jamie Foxx ("Yearning for Your Love"), and Stevie Wonder ("Burn Rubber") with Wilson himself taking to the stage at the request of Timberlake to perform his Grammy-nominated song "You Are" and then transition into a medley of hit songs performing alongside Timberlake and surprise guests Snoop Dogg and Pharrell Williams.

In 2018, Bruno Mars asked Wilson to join him on the final leg of his 24K Magic Tour. Mars also produced, co-wrote, and sang background vocals on Wilson's 2020 single release, "Forever Valentine". The song peaked to #1 on Billboard's Adult R&B Chart.

In 2019, Wilson gave backing vocals on Tyler, the Creator's 2019 album Igor. He gave vocals for Earfquake, Boyfriend & I Don't Love You Anymore. Wilson also performed at the 62nd Annual Grammy Awards with Tyler, the Creator and Boyz II Men, performing the songs Earfquake and New Magic Wand by Tyler, the Creator.

In 2020, Wilson featured on the song "Roots" with Amine and JID, and Nas' "Car #85", from his Grammy-winning album, King's Disease. In 2021, he featured on the song "I'll Take You On," with Brockhampton.

Wilson has also been a vocalist and contributor/collaborator to dozens of songs in the hip hop, rap, and R&B communities. Wilson appeared on The Biggie Duets together with R. Kelly on the song "Mi Casa". He has worked with Snoop Dogg on numerous projects. Their first collaboration was Snoop's 1996 album Tha Doggfather, on which Wilson appeared on four songs: "Doggfather", "Snoop Bounce", "Groupie" (also featuring 213, and "Tha Dogg Pound"), and "Snoop's Upside Ya Head". Wilson also worked with 2Pac and the Dogg Pound on an unreleased song "Just Watching" (1996), as well as "Wanted Dead Or Alive", which featured him on the hook and 2Pac & Snoop rapping. He was also featured on the Grammy-nominated single "Beautiful" (together with Pharrell) from Snoop's 2002 album Paid tha Cost to Be da Boss. Additionally, Wilson appeared on "Signs" (with Justin Timberlake) and "Perfect", both songs from Snoop's 2004 album R&G (Rhythm & Gangsta) The Masterpiece. He was also featured on Snoop's 2008 album Ego Trippin', on the songs "SD is Out" and "Can't Say Goodbye"; the latter was also performed live with Snoop and Wilson at 2008's American Idol Gives Back charity concert.

According to Wilson's website, Snoop Dogg (with whom he is good friends) nicknamed him "Uncle Charlie". Snoop and his wife, Shante, renewed their vows in April 2008 at Wilson's 20 acre ranch outside of Los Angeles, CA. The event inspired the music video to Wilson's hit "There Goes My Baby", which featured Snoop and his wife and was given to them as a gift symbolizing their relationship.

In 2024, Wilson competed in season eleven of The Masked Singer as "Ugly Sweater". He was eliminated on "Queen Night" alongside Kate Flannery as "Starfish" where he did an encore of the Gap Band song "You Dropped a Bomb on Me".

In June 2025, country music singer Scotty McCreery and Wilson released their duet "Once Upon a Bottle of Wine" from McCreery's digital EP, Scooter & Friends (released July 18, 2025).

=== Support for American servicemen and women ===
In 2008, Wilson participated and performed on the ABC Television Special, America United: Supporting Our Troops, which was taped at Camp Pendleton, in California.

Wilson has spent time entertaining American troops in the Middle East. He and his band have traveled to Kuwait and Iraq four times (2009, 2010, and twice in 2011), visiting bases throughout both countries. Wilson's November 2011 trip was in response to a special request by the U.S. Armed Forces for Wilson to return to the Middle East and perform at five bases in Kuwait for the thousands of troops stationed there.

== Personal life ==
In 1995, Wilson married Mahin Tat. They met in that same year, when she was his social worker during his time in a drug rehabilitation program. Since 1995, Wilson has been clean from his cocaine and alcohol addictions that led him to becoming homeless and sleeping on the streets of Hollywood Boulevard from 1993 to 1995.

In 2008, he was diagnosed with prostate cancer and treated successfully with implants. He has since worked with the Prostate Cancer Foundation, encouraging Black men to be tested for the disease. He has also spread awareness by providing vocals for Lupe Fiasco's single, titled "Mission", which focuses on cancer survivors. In a candid interview on the Off Air with Big Boy podcast, Wilson talked about how he suffered a terrifying health scare after experiencing multiple strokes around October 2025. After suffering the strokes, Wilson underwent months of intense physical rehabilitation to relearn how to walk.

== Discography ==
Studio albums

- You Turn My Life Around (1992)
- Bridging the Gap (2000)
- Charlie, Last Name Wilson (2005)
- Uncle Charlie (2009)
- Just Charlie (2010)
- Love, Charlie (2013)
- Forever Charlie (2015)
- In It to Win It (2017)

== Awards and nominations ==
=== Grammys ===
Wilson has been nominated for thirteen Grammy Awards.

- 2018 Grammy Nomination – Best Traditional R&B Performance for "Made For Love"
- 2016 Grammy Nomination – Best R&B Album for Forever Charlie
- 2016 Grammy Nomination – Best Traditional R&B Performance for "My Favorite Part of You"
- 2015 Grammy Nomination – Best Rap Song (with Kanye West) for "Bound 2"
- 2015 Grammy Nomination – Best Rap/Sung Collaboration (with Kanye West) for "Bound 2"
- 2014 Grammy Nomination – Best Gospel Song for "If I Believe"
- 2012 Grammy Nomination – Best R&B Performance "You Are"
- 2012 Grammy Nomination – Best R&B Song for "You Are"
- 2010 Grammy Nomination – Best R&B Album for Uncle Charlie
- 2010 Grammy Nomination – Best Male R&B Vocal Performance for "There Goes My Baby"
- 2003 Grammy Nomination – Best Rap/Song Collaboration (with Pharrell & Snoop Dogg) for "Beautiful"
- 1997 Grammy Nomination – Best R&B Performance by a Duo or Group with Vocals (with Luke, Mr. X, Melle Mel, Yo-Yo, Chaka Khan, Da Luniz, Shaquille O'Neal, Quincy Jones & Coolio) for "Stomp"
- 1983 Grammy Nomination – Best R&B Instrumental Performance for "Where Are We Going"

=== NAACP Image Awards ===
- 2021 NAACP Image Award Nomination - Outstanding Male Artist
- 2018 NAACP Image Award WINNER - Music Makes A Difference Honor
- 2018 NAACP Image Award Nomination - Outstanding Male Artist
- 2018 NAACP Image Award Nomination - Outstanding Album for In It To Win It
- 2018 NAACP Image Award Nomination - Outstanding Duo, Group, or Collaboration for "I'm Blessed"
- 2016 NAACP Image Award Nomination – Outstanding Male Artist
- 2016 NAACP Image Award Nomination – Outstanding Album for Forever Charlie
- 2016 NAACP Image Award Nomination – Outstanding Song Traditional for "Goodnight Kisses"
- 2014 NAACP Image Award WINNER – Outstanding Album for Love, Charlie
- 2014 NAACP Image Award Nomination – Outstanding Male Artist
- 2010 NAACP Image Award Nomination – Outstanding Male Artist

=== Honors ===
- November 5, 2013 – SoulTracks Reader's Choice Award – Major Label Album of the Year – Charlie Wilson Love, Charlie
- June 30, 2013 – Lifetime Achievement Award presented to Charlie Wilson at the BET Awards
- January 2013 – Lifetime Achievement Award presented to Charlie Wilson by the Trumpet Awards Foundation
- December 2011 – Billboard Magazine names Charlie Wilson the No. 2 Adult R&B Artist for 2011
- December 2011 – Billboard Magazine names "You Are" the No. 2 Urban Adult Song for 2011
- December 2011 – Mediabase names Charlie Wilson No. 1 Adult R&B Artist for 2011
- December 2011 – Mediabase names "You Are" the No. 1 Urban Adult Song for 2011
- February 2010 – NAACP Image Award Nomination for Outstanding Male Artist
- December 2009 – Billboard Magazine names Charlie Wilson No. 1 Adult R&B Artist for 2009
- December 2009 – Billboard Magazine names "There Goes My Baby" the No. 1 Urban Adult Song for 2009
- November 2009 – Soul Train Icon Award presented to Charlie Wilson
- September 2005 – BMI Icon Award presented to Charlie Wilson
