= Back of My Lac' =

Studio album by J. Holiday
- Released: October 2, 2007
- Recorded: 2006–2007
- Studio: Studio 13 (Washington D.C.), Signature Sound Studio, Music Line Studio, Triangle Sound Studio, The Red Room, J. Que's Crib, Phonix Ave Studio, DARP Studios (Atlanta, Georgia), The Gin House, (Hollywood, California), Dark Child Studios (Pleasantville, New Jersey)
- Genre: R&B; hip hop
- Length: 57:17
- Label: Music Line; Capitol
- Producer: Anthony "TA" Tate (exec.); Corey Green (co-exec.); Los Da Mystro; Darkchild; The-Dream; The Platinum Brothers; Donnie Scantz; Travis Cherry; J.U.S.T.I.C.E. League; Sean Garrett; Oak Felder

J. Holiday chronology
Back of My Lac' (2007)	Round 2 (2009)

Deluxe edition cover

Singles from Back of My Lac'
- 1. "Be with Me" Released: October 31, 2006; 2. "Bed" Released: June 19, 2007; 3. "Suffocate" Released: October 2, 2007; 4. "Come Here" Released: April 15, 2008

Back of My Lac' is the debut studio album from American R&B singer J. Holiday that was released in the United States on October 2, 2007, by Music Line Group and Capitol Records. Production for this album was handled by Los Da Mystro, Darkchild, The-Dream, The Platinum Brothers, Donnie Scantz, Travis Cherry, J.U.S.T.I.C.E. League, Sean Garrett and Oak Felder

The album was supported by three singles, "Be with Me", "Bed" and "Suffocate".

Upon its release, Back of My Lac' received generally mixed reviews from music critics. The album debuted at number five on the US Billboard 200, selling 105,000 copies in its first week. The album was nominated for Best Contemporary R&B Album at the 51st Grammy Awards, but lost to Mary J. Blige's Growing Pains.

== Background ==
In early 2000s, he met Corey Green whom he found was in the same direction with him. Soon both formed a duo called 295 that experienced mild popularity. All the while Corey would hook them up with music executives that come to Washington just to watch their performances. They soon got frustrated for not getting discovered and eventually disbanded in 2003 while remaining friends until Holiday's solo career. Holiday would soon secure a record deal with Jazze Pha's Sho'nuff Records.

The album was originally meant to be released by the end of 2006, however it was pushed back to early 2007 and then pushed to its final release of October 2. J. Holiday worked with Ne-Yo on three songs between December 2005 and January 2006 that did not make the album.

== Singles ==
The album's lead single, "Be with Me", was released on October 31, 2006. The song was produced by Rodney "Darkchild" Jerkins. The song did not fare well commercially, failing to chart on the Billboard Hot 100 and has since peaked at #83 on the Hot R&B/Hip-Hop Songs.

The second single, "Bed", was released on June 19, 2007, it peaked at number 5 on the U.S. Billboard Hot 100 and number one on Hot R&B/Hip Hop Songs for five weeks total and was certified gold by the Recording Industry Association of America (RIAA).

The third single, "Suffocate" was released on October 2, 2007, the song has peaked at #2 on the Hot R&B/Hip-Hop Songs Chart and #18 on the Billboard Hot 100. The video for the single was shot in Paris, France and debuted on BET's 106 & Park on November 7, 2007.

"City Boy" featuring 8 Ball & MJG was released as a promotional single, the song was not included in the US version of the album, but is featured on the album only as a bonus track in several countries.

"Come Here" was released as a single but was ultimately canceled.

== Critical reception ==
Professional ratings
Review scores
Source	Rating
About.com	4/5 stars
AllMusic	3/5 stars
Entertainment Weekly	B−
The Guardian	4/5 stars
Rolling Stone	2.5/5 stars

Back of My Lac' received mixed reviews from critics. Mark Edward Nero from About.com reviewed the album favorably, saying: "It's rare that young artist puts out such a well-rounded album, one that young men can totally relate to and that young women will be swept off their feet by, but Back of My Lac', is just such an album. It's charming, gritty, sensual, original and most of all-real. Ladies and gentlemen, J. Holiday has arrived. And he definitely is that dude."

Fan reviews remain highly favorable for the album, praising its overall consistency and well roundness. "Fatal", "Bed","Thank You" and "Suffocate" have been frequently referenced as favorites.

== Commercial performance ==
The album debuted on the U.S. Billboard 200 chart at number 5, selling 105,000 copies in its first week. It debuted at #1 on the Top R&B/Hip-Hop Albums. The album debuted in the Top 20 R&B/Hip Hop albums in Canada and charted within the Top 100 albums in Canada. It became a Top 10 R&B/Hip Hop album in the UK and a Top 40 UK album entry peaking at #32. In the U.S it also made it to #8 on the Tastemakers chart and #5 on the Top Digital Albums and Billboard Comprehensive Albums Chart.

== Track listing ==
Back of My Lac' – Standard edition
No.	Title	Writer(s)	Producer(s)	Length
1.	"Back of My Lac"	Naham Grymes; Quincy Lowe; William Robinson; Marvin Tarpin; William DeVaughn	Quincy Lowe	4:49
2.	"Ghetto"	Grymes; Donnie Scantz; Sam Thomas	Donnie Scantz	4:11
3.	"Thug Commandments"	Neely Dinkins; Vito Colapietto; Balewa Muhammad; Frank "Sekay" Oliphant; Anthony Hester	The Co-Stars; Balewa Muhammad	3:29
4.	"Bed"	Carlos McKinney; Terius Nash	The-Dream; Los Da Mystro	4:35
5.	"Betcha Never Had"	Sean Garrett; Warren Felder	Sean Garrett; Oak Felder	3:01
6.	"Laa Laa"	Adam Gibbs; Mike Chesser; Grymes; Nash	The Platinum Brothers	4:31
7.	"Come Here"	Gibbs; Chesser; Robert L. Huggar; Travis Cherry; Karl Antoine	The Platinum Brothers, co-produced by Travis Cherry	3:30
8.	"Be with Me"	Grymes; Jerkins; Adonis Shropshire	Rodney "Darkchild" Jerkins	3:58
9.	"Suffocate"	Stewart; Nash	Christopher 'Tricky' Stewart	3:40
10.	"Fatal"	Paul; Smith; P. Smith; Erika Nuri	Korran Paul; Gil Smith II; Patrick "J. Que" Smith (co.)	5:16
11.	"Without You"	Jerkins; Grymes; Shropshire; Mitchah Williams; Burt Bacharach; Hal David	Rodney "Darkchild" Jerkins; Mitchah "Genesis" Williams	3:47
12.	"Pimp In Me"	Jasper Carmon	Jasper Cameron	4:25
13.	"Thank You"	Shropshire; E. Vixon	Adonis Shropshire	4:23
14.	"Fallin'"	Grymes; Erik Ortiz; C. Brown III; Kevin Crowe	J.U.S.T.I.C.E. League	3:42

Back of My Lac' – Deluxe edition (bonus tracks)
No.	Title	Writer(s)	Producer(s)	Length
15.	"Sooner You Get to Love"	Ned Doheny; Donnie Scantz; James Stuart; Nahum Grymes	Donnie Scantz	3:56
16.	"I Know Love"	Nahum Grymes; Gary Cooper; William Collins; Mike Chesser; Adam Gibbs; Garry Shider; George Clinton Jr.; Dayton Wellington	The Platinum Brothers	3:49
17.	"When You Get Home"	Michael A. Chesser; Adam M. Gibbs; Kenny Gamble; Leon A. Huff; Nahum Thorton Grymes; Travis Demond Cherry	The Platinum Brothers, co-produced by Travis Cherry	3:52

Back of My Lac' - International Bonus Track
No.	Title	Writer(s)	Producer(s)	Length
15.	"City Boy" (featuring 8Ball & MJG)	C. Brown III; E. Ortiz; K. Crowe; Nahum Grymes	J.U.S.T.I.C.E. League	3:42

Back of My Lac' - Japan Bonus Track
No.	Title	Writer(s)	Producer(s)	Length
15.	"Good for Each Other"	C. Brown III; E. Ortiz; K. Crowe; Nahum Grymes	J.U.S.T.I.C.E. League	3:33

Back of My Lac' - Brazil Bonus Track
No.	Title	Producer(s)	Length
15.	"Bed (Haji & Emanuel Remix)"	The-Dream & Los Da Mystro	4:35

== Charts ==
=== Weekly charts ===
Weekly chart performance for Back of My Lac'
Chart (2007)	Peak position
UK R&B Albums (OCC)	33
US Billboard 200	5
US Digital Albums (Billboard)	5
US Top R&B/Hip-Hop Albums (Billboard)	1
US Top Tastemaker Albums (Billboard)	8

=== Year-end charts ===
Chart (2007)	Position
US Top R&B/Hip-Hop Albums (Billboard)	57
Chart (2008)	Position
US Billboard 200	109
US Top R&B/Hip-Hop Albums (Billboard)	23

== Release history ==
Region	Date	Version	Format(s)	Label
United States	October 2, 2007	Standard Edition	CD, digital download	Music Line, Capitol
United States	February 5, 2008	Deluxe Edition	CD, digital download	Music Line, Capitol

== Certifications and sales ==
Region	Certification	Certified units/sales
United States (RIAA)	Gold	500,000^{^}
^{^} Shipments figures based on certification alone.
