= You Turn My Life Around =

Studio album by Charlie Wilson
- Released: July 21, 1992
- Recorded: 1991–1992
- Genre: R&B
- Length: 53:35
- Label: MCA

Charlie Wilson chronology
You Turn My Life Around (1992)	Bridging the Gap (2000)

Professional ratings
Review scores
Source	Rating
AllMusic	3/5 stars

You Turn My Life Around is the debut solo studio album released by Charlie Wilson. It was released on July 21, 1992, from Bon Ami Records, through a production and distribution agreement with the then called MCA Records. The album peaked at #42 on Billboard's R&B Album chart when it was released in 1992. The first single was the new jack swing patterned "Sprung On Me".

== Track listing ==
#	Title	Writer(s)	Length
1.	Sprung On Me	Kelly Carrington, Lemont Drew, Michael Williams	4:21
2.	Come Into My Love Life	Morris Rentie, Charlie Wilson	4:20
3.	Charlie's Jam	Joey Robinson Jr., Reggie Griffin	4:15
4.	Realize	Charlie Wilson, Morris Rentie, Jeff Lorber	4:35
5.	You Turn My Life Around	Jeff Lorber, Morris Rentie, Orvalette Rentie, Charles Wilson	5:20
6.	This Is My Prayer	Tony Haynes, Charlie Wilson, Phillip Laney Stewart II	7:19
7.	Confess Your Love	Orvalette Rentie, Morris Rentie	4:46
8.	Time	Kelly Carrington, Lemont Drew, Michael Williams	4:30
9.	I Found My Baby	Stanley Brown	4:52
10.	I'm Gonna Make You Love Me	Morris Rentie, Joey Robinson Jr.	3:44
11.	Please Believe Me [*]	Morris Rentie, Marva King, Jeff Lorber	5:33

== Charts ==
Chart (1992)	Peak position
US Top R&B/Hip-Hop Albums (Billboard)	42
