= It's Yours (J. Holiday song) =

Single by J. Holiday

from the album Round 2
- Released: December 16, 2008
- Recorded: 2008
- Genre: R&B; hip hop
- Length: 4:06
- Label: Music Line Group; Capitol
- Songwriters: Jasper Cameron; Nahum Grymes
- Producer: Jasper Cameron

J. Holiday singles chronology
"I Won't Tell" (2007)	"It's Yours" (2008)	"After We Fuck" (2013)

Music video
- "It’s Yours" on YouTube

"It's Yours" is a song by American R&B singer J. Holiday. It was released on December 16, 2008, as the first and only single from his second studio album, Round 2 (2009). The single features production from Jasper Cameron (Lloyd's You and Player's Prayer).

The song was well received, becoming the most added single at Urban Mainstream radio the week of December 13, 2008.

== Track listing ==
Digital download
No.	Title	Length
1.	"It's Yours"	4:06

== Music video ==
The music video premiered on Yahoo and it was directed by Jonathan Mannion. It appeared at #78 on BET's Notarized: Top 100 Videos of 2009 countdown.

== Charts ==
=== Weekly charts ===
Chart (2008–09)	Peak position
Japan Hot 100 (Billboard)	33
US Bubbling Under Hot 100 (Billboard)	3
US Hot R&B/Hip-Hop Songs (Billboard)	25

=== Year-end charts ===
Chart (2009)	Position
US Hot R&B/Hip-Hop Songs (Billboard)	86

== Release history ==
United States - December 16, 2008 - Digital download

United States - January 26, 2009 - Rhymitic radio
