= Without You (Charlie Wilson song) =

Single by Charlie Wilson

from the album Bridging the Gap
- Released: August 1, 2000
- Genre: R&B
- Length: 5:00 (album version); 3:41 (single edit)
- Label: Interscope
- Songwriter(s): Katrina Celeste Willis; Thabiso Nkhereanye; Laney Stewart; Traci Colleen Hale; Orenthal Lamar Harper

Charlie Wilson singles chronology
"Vapors" (1997)	"Without You" (2000)	"Big Pimpin'" (2000)

"Without You" is a song performed by Charlie Wilson, issued as the lead single from his 2000 album Bridging the Gap. It was his first solo single since 1992's "Sprung on Me", and it peaked at #26 on the Billboard R&B chart.

== Chart positions ==
Chart (2000)	Peak position
US Hot R&B/Hip-Hop Songs (Billboard)	26
