= Be with Me (J. Holiday song) =

Single by J. Holiday

from the album Back of My Lac'
- Released: October 31, 2006
- Recorded: 2006
- Genre: R&B
- Length: 4:01
- Label: Music Line Group, Capitol
- Songwriters: R. Jerkins, N. Grymes and A. Shropshire
- Producer: Darkchild

J. Holiday singles chronology
"Be with Me" (2006)	"Bed" (2007)

"Be with Me" is the debut single co-written and performed by R&B singer J. Holiday released off of his debut album Back of My Lac'. It was to be released in early 2007, following the single. However, due to the single failing to top the charts peaking at #83 on the Hot R&B/Hip-Hop Songs and completely missing the Billboard Hot 100 all together, the album was pushed back to an unspecified fall release date, until finally being released October 2, 2007, following the success of his second single titled "Bed". The single's promotion fell through due to the merging of Capitol & Virgin Records; LeToya Luckett, Mims, Cherish, and Chingy had cancelled third singles, and Chingy was let go from the label, while J. Holiday's promotion for the song was also canceled.

== Music video ==
The music video is set inside the Washington, DC landmark Ben's Chili Bowl.

== Chart positions ==
Chart (2006)	Peak position
US Hot R&B/Hip-Hop Songs (Billboard)	83
