= Bed (J. Holiday song) =

Single by J. Holiday

from the album Back of My Lac'
- Released: June 19, 2007
- Genre: R&B
- Length: 4:26 (album version); 3:53 (radio edit)
- Label: Music Line; Capitol
- Songwriters: Carlos McKinney; Terius Nash
- Producers: The-Dream; Los Da Mystro

J. Holiday singles chronology
"Be with Me" (2006)	"Bed" (2007)	"Suffocate" (2007)

Music video
- "Bed" on YouTube

"Bed" is a song by American singer J. Holiday serving as the second single for his debut studio album, Back of My Lac'. It was released by Capitol Records as the album's second single on June 19, 2007. It was written by Carlos "Los Da Mystro" McKinney and fellow singer Terius "The-Dream" Nash.

== Chart performance ==
"Bed" debuted on the U.S. Billboard Hot 100 in the issue week of August 4, 2007 at number 89 and has peaked at number 5. It was number 1 on the Hot R&B/Hip-Hop Songs for five weeks in a row. The single has also debuted on MTV's TRL countdown at number 9 on Tuesday July 31, 2007. On Wednesday, August 15, 2007, "Bed" hit number one on its 11th day on the countdown. This song was No. 70 on Rolling Stone's list of the 100 Best Songs of 2007. The video for "Bed" was ranked the No. 11 video of 2007 on BET: Notarized.

== Live performances ==
On August 17, 2007, Holiday gave his first televised performance of the song on MTV's TRL. "Bed" was also performed on Showtime at the Apollo along with the single "Suffocate".

== Music video ==
The music video for "Bed" was directed by Jonathan Mannion. The video starts with J. Holiday in his tour bus. Not long after he goes to a motel where he is singing the first verse. There are scenes of the woman that he is singing about though she is not present with him. The first verse also consists of a scene of Holiday singing on a brown wall. Eventually he packs his things and is walking down a deserted road and soon gets to an automobile store and buys a car. He drives to his girlfriend's house and she jumps up and hugs him. Night falls and as the song states he puts her to "Bed". The camera then shows him waking up in the morning with his girlfriend still asleep. He picks up his plane tickets and leaves in a taxi, leaving the car he bought at his girlfriend's house.

== Remixes ==
The official remix was released online on October 16, 2007 and features American rappers Ja Rule and Trina with re-sung verses and vocals by J. Holiday. The remix's main beat samples the instrumental of Luniz's 1995 song "I Got 5 on It" which samples Club Nouveau's 1987 song "Why You Treat Me So Bad". The remix also samples LL Cool J's "I Need Love" during Ja Rule's verse. It was produced by the Platinum Brothers. The second official remix features American rapper Fabolous.

A cover of the song was created for Kanye West's Yeezy Season 5 fashion show in New York City. This version, a 17-minute rework by West and hip-hop production duo DJDS, was later released officially on SoundCloud on February 28, 2017, with vocals solely provided by The-Dream.

== Usage in media ==
The song appears on the episode of "Stay fierce, Malik" January 23, 2009 on The Game. The song was also used in a dance sequence by Luke James in the 2019 film Little.

== Charts ==
=== Weekly charts ===
Chart (2007–08)	Peak position
Canada Hot 100 (Billboard)	92
New Zealand (Recorded Music NZ)	11
Scottish Singles Sales (Official Charts)	49
UK Singles (Official Charts)	32
UK Hip Hop/R&B (Official Charts)	5
US Billboard Hot 100	5
US Hot R&B/Hip-Hop Songs (Billboard)	1
US Pop Airplay (Billboard)	21
US Rhythmic Airplay (Billboard)	2

=== Year-end charts ===
Chart (2007)	Position
US Billboard Hot 100	72
US Hot R&B/Hip-Hop Songs (Billboard)	14
US Rhythmic (Billboard)	31
Chart (2008)	Position
US Hot R&B/Hip-Hop Songs (Billboard)	71

== Certifications ==
Certifications and sales for "Bed"
Region	Certification	Certified units/sales
United Kingdom (BPI)	Silver	200,000^{‡}
United States (RIAA)	Gold	500,000^{*}
Ringtone
Canada (Music Canada)	Gold	20,000^{*}
^{*} Sales figures based on certification alone.^{‡} Sales+streaming figures based on certification alone.

== See also ==
- List of number-one R&B singles of 2007 (U.S.)
