= J. Holiday =

American singer and rapper

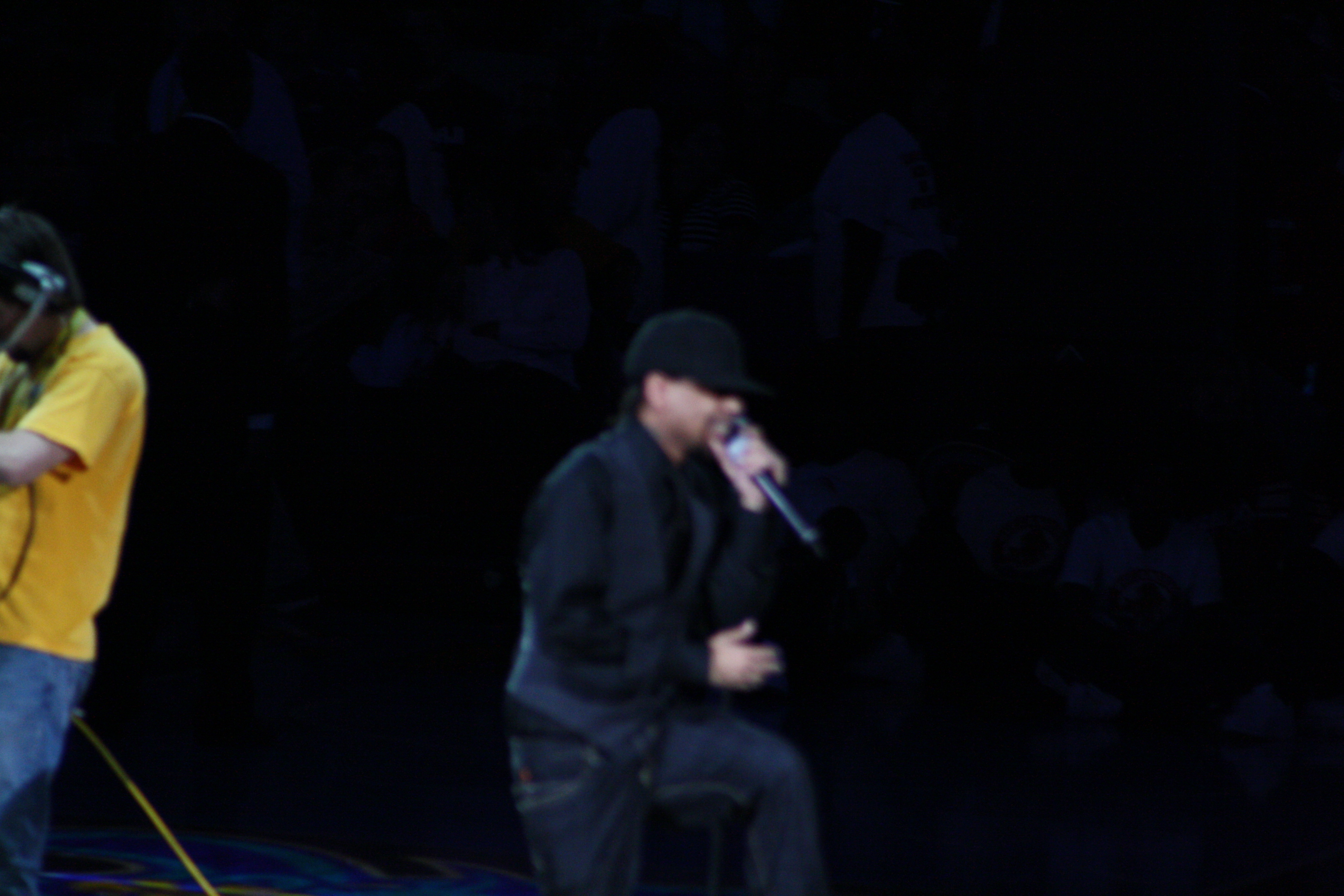
- J. Holiday performing in New Orleans in 2009

Background information
- Born: Nahum Thorton Grymes; Washington, D.C., U.S.
- Genres: R&B; hip-hop
- Occupations: Singer; rapper; songwriter
- Years active: 2006–present
- Labels: Empire; HMG; Def Jam; EMI; Capitol; Music Line
- Website: Official website

Nahum Thorton Grymes, better known by his stage name J. Holiday, is an American R&B singer and rapper. He is best known for his 2007 single "Bed", which peaked at number five on the US Billboard Hot 100. It preceded the release of his debut studio album Back of My Lac' (2007), which peaked at number five on the US Billboard 200 and number 32 on the UK Albums Chart. His second album, Round 2 (2009) peaked at number four on the former chart and was led by the single "It's Yours". After label changes and several delays, Holiday released his third album, Guilty Conscience (2014) independently, which moderately entered the Top R&B/Hip-Hop Albums chart and saw positive critical reception. He released his fourth studio album, Time, on February 7, 2022.

== Early life ==
Nahum Thorton Grymes was born in Washington, D.C., to an African-American mother Frances Grymes, and an Eritrean father. His name is inspired by a biblical figure because he is the son of a preacher. After his father died when he was just eleven, Holiday was raised alone by his mother in Washington, D.C., and Alexandria, Virginia. His mother made sure that her son completed his education and attended church. Holiday attended a local high school where he displayed his singing talent during a showcase night. By then, he frequently listened to Marvin Gaye, Boyz II Men, Tupac Shakur, R. Kelly, and Jodeci. Although he had the passion to go deep onto the music path, his mother wanted him to complete his education. Upon his graduation, Holiday began recording demo tapes.

== Career ==
=== 2006–2008: Back of My Lac ===
J. Holiday signed a recording deal with Capitol Records in 2006. He released his debut album, Back of My Lac', in October 2007. The album debuted on the U.S. Billboard 200 chart at number 5 selling 105,000 copies in its first week. It debuted at No. 1 on the Top R&B/Hip-Hop Albums. The album debuted in the Top 20 R&B/Hip Hop albums in Canada and charted within the Top 100 albums in Canada. It became a Top 10 R&B/Hip Hop album in the UK and a Top 40 UK album entry peaking at No. 32. In the U.S. it also made it to #8 on the Tastemakers chart and No. 5 on the Top Digital Albums and Billboard Comprehensive Albums Chart. The lead single from this album was "Be with Me", which stalled at No. 83 on the Hot R&B/Hip-Hop Songs Chart. "Bed" was released as the album's second single on June 19, 2007. Debuted on the U.S. Billboard Hot 100 in the issue week of July 4, 2007, at number 89 and has peaked at number 5. It was number 1 on the Hot R&B/Hip-Hop Songs for five weeks in a row. The single has also debuted on BET's 106 & Park countdown at number 9 on Tuesday July 31, 2007. On Wednesday, August 15, 2007, "Bed" hit number one on its 11th day on the countdown. J. Holiday also performed "Bed" on 106 & Park on August 17, 2007. "Bed" was also performed on Showtime at the Apollo along with the single "Suffocate". This song was No. 70 on Rolling Stone's list of the 100 Best Songs of 2007. The video for "Bed" was ranked the No. 11 video of 2007 on BET: Notarized. His video for the third single, "Suffocate", debuted on BET's 106 & Park on November 7, 2007. The video was shot in Paris, France. "Come Here" was released as a single but was ultimately canceled.

=== 2008–2009: Round 2 ===
Round 2 is the second studio album by Contemporary R&B singer J. Holiday. The album was released on March 10, 2009. The album sold 55,000 units in its first week and debuted at number 4 on the Billboard 200. "It's Yours" was the first single from the album, which featured production from The Co-Stars (Teairra Mari's "Make Her Feel Good"), and Jasper Cameron (Lloyd's "You" and "Player's Prayer"). The song was well received, becoming the most added single at Urban Mainstream radio the week of December 13, 2008. "It's Yours" peaked at 25 on the US R&B chart. The second single that was supposed to be released was "Fall", but due to label problems it was canceled like "Come Here" on his previous album.

=== 2012–2014: Guilty Conscience ===
In 2010, J. Holiday left Capitol Records and signed to Def Jam at the time working on his third album. He then released his mixtape, M.I.A: The Lost Pages, in 2011, in promotion of the album. In early 2012, J. Holiday left Def Jam Recordings. On May 29, 2012, he released his single "Sign My Name", from his upcoming third studio album. J. Holiday has been receiving heavy rotation of his single "Sign My Name" and has been on multiple radio stations giving the fans what they need. His "Sign My Name" Tour has kept him busy to the point of have performance dates booked months in advance. He embarked as the headliner in the "Bad Boyz of R&B" Tour and the release of the movie "School of HardKnocks" that he starred in alongside Elise Neal, Erica Hubbard and Cisco Reyes was highly anticipated. In July 2013, he revealed the title of his third studio album, titled Guilty Conscience, via Facebook. The album was scheduled to be released on November 11, 2013. He announced the lead single for the album titled "After We Fuck", will be sent to urban radio soon. The album was pushed back until December 10, 2013. A music video for the single will be released on November 5, 2013. Guilty Conscience was pushed back again and was released on January 28, 2014, through his label Holiday Music Group. The album achieved No. 42 on Top R&B/Hip-Hop Albums.

=== 2018–present: Time ===
On October 5, 2018, the lead single "25 to Life" was released, and an upcoming album entitled Time has been announced in the works. His 2019 single "Feel Like" was released, and has also announced his upcoming tour "Underrated Part I" which started in Birmingham, Alabama on August 3, 2019. The album was released on February 7, 2022.

== Discography ==
Studio albums

- Back of My Lac' (2007)
- Round 2 (2009)
- Guilty Conscience (2014)
- Time (2022)

== Filmography ==
Year	Title	Role	Notes
2008	Lincoln Heights	Himself	
2009	Real Housewives of Atlanta	Himself (guest appearance)	
2013	School of Hard Knocks	Jason	Film debut
2014	The Arsenio Hall Show	Himself	
2021	Conflicted	Kam	

== Tours ==
- The Double Up Tour (with R. Kelly, Ne-Yo and Keyshia Cole) (2007)
- The Guilty Conscience Tour (2013)

== Awards and nominations ==
American Music Awards

Year	Nominee / work	Award	Result
2008	J. Holiday	Favorite Soul/R&B Male Artist	Nominated

BET Awards

Year	Nominee / work	Award	Result
2008	J. Holiday	Best Male R&B Artist	Nominated

Grammy Awards

Year	Nominee / work	Award	Result
2009	Back of My Lac'	Best Contemporary R&B Album	Nominated

NAACP Image Awards

Year	Nominee / work	Award	Result
2008	J. Holiday	Outstanding New Artist	Nominated
